= 2017–18 Queens Park Rangers F.C. season =

English football club season

Queens Park Rangers
2017–18 season
- Owner: Tune Group
- Co-chairmen: Tony Fernandes; Ruben Gnanalingam
- Manager: Ian Holloway
- Stadium: Loftus Road
- EFL Championship: 16th
- FA Cup: Third round
- EFL Cup: Second round
- Top goalscorer: League: Matt Smith (11); All: Matt Smith (11)
- Highest home attendance: 16,934 vs. Aston Villa (18Nov. Championship)
- Lowest home attendance: 11,488 vs. Derby County (6 Mar. Championship)
- Average home league attendance: 13,928
- Biggest win: 4-1 Vs Norwich City (2 April 2018)
- Biggest defeat: 0-4 Nottingham Forest (4 November 2017), Hull City (7 April 2018)
Home colours	Away colours	Third colours

The 2017–18 season is Queens Park Rangers' third consecutive season in the Championship following their relegation from the Premier League in the 2014–15 season. Along with the Championship, the club will participate in the FA Cup and the EFL Cup.

== Players ==
=== First team squad ===
No.	Name	Nat	Position	Since	Date of birth (age)	Signed from	Games	Goals
Goalkeepers
1	Alex Smithies	(England)	GK	2015	5 March 1990 (age 36)	(England) Huddersfield Town	107	0
13	Matt Ingram	(England)	GK	2016	18 December 1993 (age 32)	(England) Wycombe Wanderers	6	0
26	Joe Lumley	(England)	GK	2016	15 February 1995 (age 31)	(England) Queens Park Rangers Academy	3	0
Defenders
2	Darnell Furlong	(England)	RB/CB	2015	31 October 1995 (age 30)	(England) Queens Park Rangers Academy	39	0
3	Jake Bidwell	(England)	LB	2016	21 March 1993 (age 33)	(England) Brentford	82	2
4	Grant Hall	(England)	CB/RB	2015	29 October 1991 (age 34)	(England) Tottenham Hotspur	78	1
5	Nedum Onuoha (C)	(England) (Note: Onuoha was born in Warri, Nigeria, but was raised in England and has represented them at U-20 and U-21 level.)	CB/RB	2012	12 November 1986 (age 39)	(England) Manchester City	207	7
6	Joel Lynch	(Wales) (Note: Lynch was born in Eastbourne, England, but also qualifies to represent Wales internationally through his father and made his international debut for Wales in August 2012.)	CB/LB	2016	3 October 1987 (age 38)	(England) Huddersfield Town	55	4
18	Jack Robinson	(England)	LB/CB	2014	1 September 1993 (age 32)	(England) Liverpool	39	2
20	Alex Baptiste	(England)	CB	2018	31 January 1986 (age 40)	(England) Middlesbrough	26	0
24	James Perch	(England)	RB/CB/DM	2015	28 September 1985 (age 40)	(England) Wigan Athletic	74	0
29	Osman Kakay	(England)	RB	2015	25 September 1997 (age 28)	(England) Queens Park Rangers Academy	3	0
32	Niko Hämäläinen	(Finland) (Note: Hämäläinen was born in Florida, United States, but also qualifies to represent Finland internationally through his father and has represented them at U-18, U-19, and U-21 level.)	LB/CB	2016	5 March 1997 (age 29)	(England) Queens Park Rangers Academy	3	0
Midfielders
7	Luke Freeman	(England)	AM/RM/LM	2017	22 March 1992 (age 34)	(England) Bristol City	61	7
8	Jordan Cousins	(England)	CM/RM/LM	2016	6 March 1994 (age 32)	(England) Charlton Athletic	33	0
11	Josh Scowen	(England)	CM	2017	29 April 1993 (age 33)	(England) Barnsley	42	1
12	Jamie Mackie	(Scotland) (Note: Mackie was born in Dorking, England, but also qualifies to represent Scotland internationally through his grandfather and made his international debut for Scotland in October 2010.)	RW/LW/CF	2015	22 September 1985 (age 40)	(England) Nottingham Forest	138	24
14	Ryan Manning	(Republic of Ireland)	CM	2015	14 June 1996 (age 29)	(Republic of Ireland) Galway United	37	3
21	Massimo Luongo	(Australia)	CM/AM/DM	2015	25 September 1992 (age 33)	(England) Swindon Town	104	7
22	Paweł Wszołek	(Poland)	RW/LW/RB	2016	30 April 1992 (age 34)	(Italy) Hellas Verona	65	5
33	Ilias Chair	(Morocco) (Note: Chair was born in Belgium, but also qualifies to represent Morocco internationally and has trained with the Morocco national under-20 football team.)	Midfielder	2017	30 October 1997 (age 28)	(Belgium) Lierse	4	1
34	Bright Osayi-Samuel	(Nigeria)	RW/LW	2017	31 December 1997 (age 28)	(England) Blackpool	18	1
36	David Wheeler	(England)	RW/LW	2017	4 October 1990 (age 35)	(England) Exeter City	9	1
Forwards
9	Conor Washington	(Northern Ireland) (Note: Washington was born in Chatham, England, but also qualifies to represent Scotland internationally through his mother and Northern Ireland through his grandmother and made his international debut for Northern Ireland in March 2016.)	CF/RW/LW	2016	18 May 1992 (age 34)	(England) Peterborough United	88	13
17	Matt Smith	(England)	CF	2017	7 June 1989 (age 36)	(England) Fulham	56	16
30	Eberechi Eze	(England)	CF	2016	29 June 1998 (age 27)	(England) Millwall	16	2
37	Paul Smyth	(Northern Ireland)	CF	2017	10 September 1997 (age 28)	(Northern Ireland) Linfield	13	2
38	Aramide Oteh	(England)	CF	2017	10 September 1998 (age 27)	(England) Tottenham Hotspur	6	1
40	Idrissa Sylla	(Guinea)	CF/RW/LW	2016	3 December 1990 (age 35)	(Belgium) Anderlecht	58	17

== Kit ==
Errea became manufacturers of QPR's kit. Bookmaker Royal Panda became kit sponsors.

Home	Home alt.	Home alt.	Away	Third

=== Kit information ===
QPR agreed a multi-year partnership with Erreà to replace Dryworld as the official technical kit suppliers from the 2017/18 season. The kits will be 100 per-cent bespoke designs for the duration of the deal. The Kits were revealed on 23 June.

On 22 June QPR announced a three-year shirt sponsorship deal with online casino Royal Panda.

== New contracts ==
No.	Pos	Player	Contract length	Contract end	Date	Source
12	FW	(Scotland) Jamie Mackie	1 year	2018	19 May 2017	
28	FW	(Republic of Ireland) Reece Grego-Cox (Note: Grego-Cox was born in Hammersmith and Fulham, England, but also qualifies to represent the Republic of Ireland internationally through his grandparents and has represented them at U-17, U-19, and U-21 level.)	1 year	2018	19 May 2017	
—	FW	(England) Danny Rowe	1 year	2018	21 May 2017	
—	MF	(Montserrat) Brandon Comley (Note: Comley was born in Islington, England, but also qualifies to represent Montserrat internationally and has been called up by the Montserrat national football team.)	1 year	2018	30 June 2017	
14	MF	(Republic of Ireland) Ryan Manning	3 years	2020	17 July 2017	
33	MF	(Morocco) Ilias Chair	2.5 years	2020	9 February 2018	

== Transfers ==
=== Transfers in ===
Date from	Position	Nationality	Name	From	Fee	Ref.
1 July 2017	CM	(Northern Ireland)	Charlie Owens	Tottenham Hotspur	Free	
1 July 2017	DF	(United States)	Giles Phillips	FC Barrington	Free	
1 July 2017	CM	(England)	Josh Scowen	Barnsley	Free	
12 July 2017	RW	(England)	Chay Tilt	West Bromwich Albion	Free	
7 August 2017	RB	(England)	Alex Baptiste	Middlesbrough	Free	
29 August 2017	FW	(Northern Ireland)	Paul Smyth	Linfield	Undisclosed	
31 August 2017	RW	(England)	David Wheeler	Exeter City	£500,000	
31 August 2017	LW	(Nigeria)	Bright Osayi-Samuel	Blackpool	Undisclosed	
14 September 2017	FW	(England)	Zenon Stylianides	Tottenham Hotspur	Free	
5 January 2018	FW	(England)	Deshane Dalling	Huddersfield	Free	

=== Transfers out ===
Date from	Position	Nationality	Name	To	Fee	Ref.
1 July 2017	CM	(Wales) (Note: Doughty was born in Westminster, England, but also qualifies to represent Wales internationally and has represented them at U-19 and U-21 level.)	Michael Doughty	Peterborough United	Undisclosed	
1 July 2017	CM	(England)	Ben Gladwin	Blackburn Rovers	Undisclosed	
1 July 2017	DM	(England)	Karl Henry	Bolton Wanderers (Note: Following Henry's release he joined Bolton Wanderers.)	Free	
7 July 2017	RW	(England)	Josh Bowler	Everton	Undisclosed	
23 August 2017	AM	(Netherlands)	Abdenasser El Khayati	ADO Den Haag (Note: Following El Khayati's release he joined ADO Den Haag.)	Free	
28 December 2017	DF	(England)	Steven Caulker	Dundee (Note: Following Caulker's release he joined Dundee.)	Free	
3 January 2018	RW	(Democratic Republic of the Congo) (Note: Ngbakoto was born in Croix, France, and has represented them at U-17 and U-18 level, but also qualifies to represent DR Congo internationally and made his international debut for DR Congo in March 2017.)	Yeni Ngbakoto	Guingamp	Undisclosed	
12 January 2018	FW	(Republic of Ireland)	Reece Grego-Cox	Woking (Note: Following Grego-Cox's release he joined Woking.)	Free	
12 January 2018	RW	(Canada)	Michael Petrasso	Montreal Impact (Note: Following Petrasso's release he joined Montreal Impact.)	Free	
17 January 2018	CM	(Montserrat)	Brandon Comley	Colchester United	Undisclosed	
22 January 2018	FW	(England)	Danny Rowe	Free agent	Free	
23 January 2018	FW	(England)	Dan Darbyshire	Dartford (Note: Following Darbyshire's release he joined Dartford.)	Free	
25 January 2018	CM	(Poland)	Ariel Borysiuk	Lechia Gdańsk (Note: Following Borysiuk's release he joined Lechia Gdańsk.)	Free	
29 January 2018	AM	(France)	Axel Prohouly	Free agent	Free	
12 April 2018	GK	(England)	Martin Herdman	Retired (Note: Following Herdman's release he retired.)	—N/a	

=== Loans out ===
Date from	Position	Nationality	Name	To	Until	Ref.
31 July 2017	DF	(England)	Jack Williams	Wycombe Wanderers	1 January 2018	
3 August 2017	DF	(England)	Alex Finney	Maidstone United	Approximately; 1 January 2018 (Note: On approximately 1 January 2018, Finney's loan at Maidstone United was cut short from 6 January 2018 to approximately 1 January 2018)	
30 August 2017	FW	(England)	Brandon Adams	Linfield	30 June 2018	
30 August 2017	FW	(England)	Eberechi Eze	Wycombe Wanderers	2 January 2018	
31 August 2017	CM	(Montserrat)	Brandon Comley	Colchester United	14 January 2018	
31 August 2017	GK	(England)	Matt Ingram	Northampton Town	8 January 2018 (Note: On 8 January 2018, Ingram's loan at Northampton Town was cut short from 30 June 2018 to 8 January 2018)	
28 October 2017	GK	(Switzerland)	Seny Dieng	Whitehawk	Approximately; 4 January 2018 (Note: Dieng's loan at Whitehawk was extended from 25 November 2017 to approximately 4 January 2018)	
13 December 2017	GK	(Poland)	Marcin Brzozowski	Ashford Town	9 January 2018	
15 December 2017	LB	(England)	Caden Genovesi (work experience)	Whitehawk	Unknown	
28 December 2017	GK	(England)	Martin Herdman	Staines Town	24 January 2018	
1 January 2018	GK	(England)	Conor Hudnott	Staines Town	30 June 2018 (Note: On 23 January 2018, Hudnott's loan at Staines Town was extended from 27 January 2018 to 30 June 2018.)	
3 January 2018	CM	(England)	Sean Goss	Rangers	30 June 2018	
8 January 2018	GK	(England)	Joe Lumley	Blackpool	30 June 2018	
22 January 2018	DF	(England)	Alex Finney	Maidstone United	30 June 2018	
31 January 2018	RW	(Republic of Ireland)	Olamide Shodipo	Colchester United	30 June 2018	
16 March 2018	GK	(Switzerland)	Seny Dieng	Hampton & Richmond Borough	30 April 2018	
23 March 2018	CM	(Australia)	Joshua Wallen	Chelmsford City	30 June 2018	

== Friendlies ==
For the 2017/18 season, QPR announced pre-season friendlies against Peterborough United, FC Union Berlin, Lokomotive Leipzig, Bournemouth as well as behind-closed-doors games against Bromley, and Reading.

Win Draw Loss

4 July 2017	Queens Park Rangers	4–0	Bromley	Harlington, London
	Washington 17' 40'; Matt Smith 39'; Idrissa Sylla 67'	Report		Stadium: Imperial College Sports Ground

8 July 2017	Reading	2–1	Queens Park Rangers	Wokingham
13:00 BST	Beerans 15'; East 38'	Report	Washington pen 40'	Stadium: Hogwood Park

8 July 2017	Reading	5–2	Queens Park Rangers	Wokingham
14:45 BST	Namaso 7'; Popa 13'; Loader 26' 37' 54'	Report	Grego-Cox 86'; Owens 90'	Stadium: Hogwood Park

15 July 2017	Peterborough United	2–4	Queens Park Rangers	Peterborough
15:00 BST	Morias 63', 72'	Report	Mackie 22'; Robinson 85'; Eze 87'; Owens 105'	Stadium: London Road Stadium

22 July 2017	FC Union Berlin (Germany)	A–A	Queens Park Rangers	Berlin, Germany
15:30 CEST (UTC+2)				Stadium: Stadion An der Alten Försterei
Note: Match Abandoned after 15 minutes due to heavy rain, making the pitch unplayable.

23 July 2017	Lokomotive Leipzig (Germany)	3–2	Queens Park Rangers	Leipzig, Germany
14:00 CEST (UTC+2)	Malone 11'; Maurer 19'; Salewski 51'	Report	Manning 54'; Wszołek 83'	Stadium: Bruno-Plache-Stadion

24 July 2017	FC Union Berlin (Germany)	2–1	Queens Park Rangers	Berlin, Germany
18:00 CEST (UTC+2)	Kreilach 19'; Hosiner 75' (pen.)	Report	Smith 48'	Stadium: Stadion An der Alten Försterei; Attendance: 8,050; Referee: Henry Muller
Note: Rescheduled From 22 July 2017.

29 July 2017	Queens Park Rangers	0–1	AFC Bournemouth	Shepherd's Bush
15:00 BST		Report	Ibe 40'	Stadium: Loftus Road; Attendance: 9,386; Referee: Andy Davies

10 November 2017	Queens Park Rangers	2–2	Charlton Athletic	Shepherd's Bush
12:00 GMT	Smith x2	Report	Best; Dodoo	Stadium: Loftus Road; Attendance: 0

== Competitions ==
=== Overview ===
Competition	Record							
Competition	G	W	D	L	GF	GA	GD	Win %
Championship	46	15	11	20	58	70	−12	32.61
FA Cup	1	0	0	1	0	1	−1	0.00
League Cup	2	1	0	1	2	4	−2	50.00
Total	49	16	11	22	60	75	−15	32.65

Source: Competitions

=== Sky Bet Championship ===
==== League table ====
Pos	Team	Pld	W	D	L	GF	GA	GD	Pts
14	Norwich City	46	15	15	16	49	60	−11	60
15	Sheffield Wednesday	46	14	15	17	59	60	−1	57
16	Queens Park Rangers	46	15	11	20	58	70	−12	56
17	Nottingham Forest	46	15	8	23	51	65	−14	53
18	Hull City	46	11	16	19	70	70	0	49

Source: English Football League
Rules for classification: 1) Points; 2) Goal difference; 3) Number of goals scored

==== Result summary ====
Overall								Home						Away					
Pld	W	D	L	GF	GA	GD	Pts	W	D	L	GF	GA	GD	W	D	L	GF	GA	GD
46	15	11	20	58	70	−12	56	12	5	6	37	31	+6	3	6	14	21	39	−18

Last updated: 6 May 2018.

==== Matches ====
Win Draw Loss Postponed

The fixtures for the 2017–18 season were announced on 21 June 2017 at 09:00 BST.

5 August 2017 1	Queens Park Rangers	2–0	Reading	Shepherd's Bush, London
15:00 BST	Washington 22', 59' (pen.); Lynch (yellow card) 57'	Report	Ilori (red card) 56'; Barrow (yellow card) 90+1'	Stadium: Loftus Road; Attendance: 14,460; Referee: Scott Duncan

12 August 2017 2	Sheffield Wednesday	1–1	Queens Park Rangers	Owlerton, Sheffield
15:00 BST	Winnall 48'	Report	Mackie 23'; Lynch (yellow card) 40'; Bidwell (yellow card) 66'; Scowen (yellow card) 82'	Stadium: Hillsborough Stadium; Attendance: 25,537; Referee: Chris Kavanagh

16 August 2017 3	Norwich City	2–0	Queens Park Rangers	Norwich
19:45 BST	Oliveira 48'; Martin (yellow card) 72'; Reed 82'	Report	Lynch (yellow card) 15'	Stadium: Carrow Road; Attendance: 26,082; Referee: Oliver Langford

19 August 2017 4	Queens Park Rangers	2–1	Hull City	Shepherd's Bush, London
15:00 BST	Smith 74' (yellow card) 90+7'; Perch (yellow card) 82'; Sylla 90+1' (yellow card) 90+2'	Report	Bowen 35'; Meyler (yellow card) 56'; Larsson (yellow card) 60'; McGregor (yellow card) 87'	Stadium: Loftus Road; Attendance: 12,609; Referee: James Linington

26 August 2017 5	Cardiff City	2–1	Queens Park Rangers	Cardiff
15:00 BST	Hoilett 22'; Bamba 45+1'	Report	Smith 15'; Furlong (yellow card) 38'	Stadium: Cardiff City Stadium; Attendance: 18,520; Referee: Simon Hooper

9 September 2017 6	Queens Park Rangers	2–1	Ipswich Town	Shepherd's Bush, London
15:00 BST	Mackie 43'; Freeman 49' (yellow card) 90'	Report	Downes (yellow card) 34'; Celina 89'	Stadium: Loftus Road; Attendance: 14,060; Referee: Andy Davies

12 September 2017 7	Queens Park Rangers	2–2	Millwall	Shepherd's Bush, London
19:45 BST	Onuoha (yellow card) 11'; Freeman (yellow card) 39'; Luongo 73'; Smith 85'	Report	McLaughlin 6' (yellow card) 83'; Williams (yellow card) 26'; Gregory (red card) 41'; Wallace 50'; Archer (yellow card) 70'; Tunnicliffe (yellow card) 80'	Stadium: Loftus Road; Attendance: 12,600; Referee: Roger East

16 September 2017 8	Middlesbrough	3–2	Queens Park Rangers	Middlesbrough
15:00 BST	Clayton (yellow card) 34'; Leadbitter (yellow card) 39'; Baker 36' (yellow card) 66'; Fletcher 55'; Assombalonga 60'; Christie (yellow card) 66'	Report	Wheeler 2'; Luongo (yellow card) 32'; Wszolek (yellow card) 47'; Mackie 50' (yellow card) 66'; Smithies (yellow card) 52'	Stadium: Riverside Stadium; Attendance: 24,790; Referee: Darren Bond

23 September 2017 9	Queens Park Rangers	0–0	Burton Albion	Shepherd's Bush, London
15:00 BST		Report		Stadium: Loftus Road; Attendance: 12,500; Referee: Andy Madley

26 September 2017 10	Barnsley	1–1	Queens Park Rangers	Barnsley
15:00 BST	Barnes 20'; Williams (yellow card) 49'	Report	Caulker (yellow card) 23'; Luongo (yellow card) 39'; Freeman 87'	Stadium: Oakwell; Attendance: 10,920; Referee: Geoff Eltringham

29 September 2017 11	Queens Park Rangers	1–2	Fulham	Shepherd's Bush, London
19:45 BST	Luongo (yellow card) 17'; Mackie (yellow card) 22'; Lynch (yellow card) 83'; Washington 90+1'	Report	Robinson 41' (o.g.); Norwood (yellow card) 63'; Fredericks (yellow card) 64'; Johansen 85'; Button (yellow card) 86'	Stadium: Loftus Road; Attendance: 16,415; Referee: Peter Bankes

14 October 2017 12	Sunderland	1–1	Queens Park Rangers	Sunderland
15:00 BST	McGeady 61'	Report	Sylla 37'	Stadium: Stadium of Light; Attendance: 26,066; Referee: Steve Martin

21 October 2017 13	Bolton Wanderers	1–1	Queens Park Rangers	Horwich
15:00 BST	Pratley 22'	Report	Sylla 78'	Stadium: Macron Stadium; Attendance: 14,243; Referee: James Linington

28 October 2017 14	Queens Park Rangers	2–1	Wolverhampton Wanderers	Shepherd's Bush, London
15:00 BST	Washington 41'; Bidwell (yellow card) 45+1'; Luongo (yellow card) 79'; Smith 81'; Lynch (yellow card) 90+6'	Report	Bonatini 43'; Saiss (yellow card) 90+5'	Stadium: Loftus Road; Attendance: 16,004; Referee: Tony Harrington

31 October 2017 15	Queens Park Rangers	1–0	Sheffield United	Shepherd's Bush, London
19:45 GMT	Sylla 4'; Cousins (yellow card) 28'; Scowen (yellow card) 90+1'	Report	Clarke (yellow card) 29'; Brooks (yellow card) 90+1'	Stadium: Loftus Road; Attendance: 13,604; Referee: Keith Stroud

4 November 2017 16	Nottingham Forest	4–0	Queens Park Rangers	West Bridgford
15:00 GMT	Walker 13', 84' (yellow card) 73'; Dowell 44'; McKay 52'	Report	Freeman (yellow card) 70'	Stadium: City Ground; Attendance: 24,021; Referee: Tim Robinson

18 November 2017 17	Queens Park Rangers	1–2	Aston Villa	Shepherd's Bush, London
15:00 GMT	Mackie 18'; Robinson (yellow card) 53'; Manning (yellow card) 76'	Report	Whelan (yellow card) 38'; Adomah 45+3', 58'; Snodgrass (yellow card) 60'; Taylor (yellow card) 90+1'	Stadium: Loftus Road; Attendance: 16,934; Referee: Darren England

21 November 2017 18	Derby County	2–0	Queens Park Rangers	Derby
19:45 GMT	Huddlestone (yellow card) 26'; Forsyth (yellow card) 37'; Vydra 45+3'; Lawrence 53'	Report	Baptiste (yellow card) 23'; Freeman (yellow card) 59'; Bidwell (yellow card) 64'	Stadium: Pride Park Stadium; Attendance: 23,296; Referee: Paul Tierney

27 November 2017 19	Queens Park Rangers	2–2	Brentford	Shepherd's Bush, London
19:45 GMT	Freeman (yellow card) 15' (goal) 90+4'; Mackie (yellow card) 27'; Smith 90+3'	Report	Vibe 52', 81' (yellow card) 63'	Stadium: Loftus Road; Attendance: 13,410; Referee: Steve Martin

2 December 2017 20	Preston North End	1–0	Queens Park Rangers	Preston
15:00 GMT	Pearson (yellow card) 79'; Huntington (yellow card) 79'; Hugill 88'	Report	Mackie (red card) 22'; Luongo (yellow card) 86'; Bidwell (yellow card) 90'; Baptiste (yellow card) 90+5' (yellow-red card) 90+6'	Stadium: Deepdale; Attendance: 11,290; Referee: Jeremy Simpson

9 December 2017 21	Queens Park Rangers	1–3	Leeds United	Shepherd's Bush, London
15:00 GMT	Scowen (yellow card) 20'; Luongo (yellow card) 55'; Wszołek 90'	Report	Phillips (yellow card) 29'; Vieira (yellow card) 56'; Alioski (yellow card) 60'; Roofe 63', 68', 90+4'	Stadium: Loftus Road; Attendance: 15,506; Referee: Chris Kavanagh

16 December 2017 22	Birmingham City	1–2	Queens Park Rangers	Birmingham
15:00 GMT	Gallagher 57' (yellow card) 67'	Report	Robinson 17', 83'; Scowen (yellow card) 45+1'; Smith (yellow card) 68'	Stadium: St Andrew's; Referee: Mike Jones

23 December 2017 23	Queens Park Rangers	1–1	Bristol City	Shepherd's Bush, London
15:00 GMT	Flint 37' (o.g.); Bidwell (yellow card) 80'	Report	Bryan (yellow card) 36'; Leko (yellow card) 56'; Flint (yellow card) 76'; Reid 81'	Stadium: Loftus Road; Attendance: 13,683; Referee: Andy Madley

26 December 2017 24	Ipswich Town	0–0	Queens Park Rangers	Ipswich
15:00 GMT	Knudsen (yellow card) 24'	Report	Scowen (yellow card) 18' (yellow-red card) 86'	Stadium: Portman Road; Attendance: 18,696; Referee: Andy Davies

29 December 2017 25	Millwall	1–0	Queens Park Rangers	Bermondsey
19:45 GMT	Morison 55'; Cooper (yellow card) 90'	Report	Wszołek (yellow card) 51'	Stadium: The Den; Attendance: 16,601; Referee: Keith Stroud

1 January 2018 26	Queens Park Rangers	2–1	Cardiff City	Shepherd's Bush, London
15:00 GMT	Smith 62'; Smyth (yellow card) 70' (goal) 72'; Freeman (yellow card) 90+3'	Report	Connolly (yellow card) 18'; Peltier (yellow card) 50'; Ralls 54'	Stadium: Loftus Road; Attendance: 13,801; Referee: Tim Robinson

13 January 2018 27	Burton Albion	1–3	Queens Park Rangers	Burton Upon Trent
15:00 GMT	Dyer 34'; Murphy (yellow card) 53'; McFadzean (yellow card) 56'; Buxton (yellow card) 90+1'	Report	Oteh 32'; Scowen (yellow card) 66'; Lynch (yellow card) 71'; Washington 74'; Luongo 87'	Stadium: Pirelli Stadium; Attendance: 4,264; Referee: Steve Martin

20 January 2018 28	Queens Park Rangers	0–3	Middlesbrough	Shepherd's Bush, London
15:00 GMT		Report	Ayala 24'; Friend 34'; Traoré 85'	Stadium: Loftus Road; Attendance: 14,182; Referee: Oliver Langford

27 January 2018 29	Bristol City	2–0	Queens Park Rangers	Bristol
15:00 GMT	Baker (red card) 32'; Diedhiou 45'; Bryan 66'; Reid (yellow card) 84'	Report	Luongo (yellow card) 80'; Smith (yellow card) 83'; Onuoha (yellow card) 83'	Stadium: Ashton Gate; Attendance: 21,492; Referee: Keith Stroud

3 February 2018 30	Queens Park Rangers	1–0	Barnsley	Shepherd's Bush, London
15:00 GMT	Cousins (yellow card) 6'; Scowen 48'; Manning (red card) 71'; Robinson (yellow card) 90+4'	Report	Gardner (yellow card) 33'	Stadium: Loftus Road; Attendance: 12,413; Referee: Tony Harrington

10 February 2018 31	Wolverhampton Wanderers	2–1	Queens Park Rangers	Wolverhampton
15:00 GMT	N'Diaye 12'; Costa 21'	Report	Lynch (yellow card) 40'; Cousins (yellow card) 45+2'; Washington 51'; Freeman (yellow card) 61'	Stadium: Molineux; Attendance: 30,168; Referee: Geoff Eltringham

17 February 2018 32	Queens Park Rangers	2–0	Bolton Wanderers	Shepherd's Bush, London
15:00 GMT	Lynch 72'; Smith 90+1'	Report	Henry (yellow card) 34'; Little (red card) 54'	Stadium: Loftus Road; Attendance: 12,638; Referee: Scott Duncan

20 February 2018 33	Sheffield United	2–1	Queens Park Rangers	Sheffield
19:45 GMT	Stearman 27'; Lundstram 50'; Evans (yellow card) 77'	Report	Freeman 63'	Stadium: Bramall Lane; Attendance: 25,339; Referee: Oliver Langford

24 February 2018 34	Queens Park Rangers	2–5	Nottingham Forest	Shepherd's Bush, London
15:00 GMT	Luongo 68'; Smith 78'; Scowen (yellow card) 84'	Report	Tomlin (yellow card) 35' (goal) 37' 47'; Lolley 51'; Pantilimon (yellow card) 72'; Cash 76'; Brereton 90+1'	Stadium: Loftus Road; Attendance: 13,675; Referee: Darren Bond

3 March 2018 P	Aston Villa	P–P	Queens Park Rangers	Birmingham
15:00 GMT		Report		Stadium: Villa Park
Note: Match postponed due to a heavy snowfall. Rescheduled for 13 March at 19:45.

6 March 2018 35	Queens Park Rangers	1–1	Derby County	Shepherd's Bush, London
19:45 GMT	Luongo 87'; Scowen (yellow card) 90+3'	Report	Forsyth (yellow card) 16'; Weimann 38', (yellow card) 82'; Lawrence (yellow card) 87'	Stadium: Loftus Road; Attendance: 11,488; Referee: Simon Hooper

10 March 2018 36	Queens Park Rangers	1–0	Sunderland	Shepherd's Bush, London
15:00 GMT	Freeman (yellow card) 61'; Eze 62'; Onuoha (yellow card) 74'	Report	Steele (red card) 49'; O'Shea (yellow card) 70'	Stadium: Loftus Road; Attendance: 14,216; Referee: Robert Jones

13 March 2018 37	Aston Villa	1–3	Queens Park Rangers	Birmingham
19:45 GMT	Chester 88'; Grealish (yellow card) 90+2'	Report	Manning 12'; Bidwell 33', (yellow card) 90+2'; Lynch (yellow card) 59'; Freeman 82'	Stadium: Villa Park; Attendance: 30,228; Referee: Tim Robinson

17 March 2018 38	Fulham	2–2	Queens Park Rangers	Fulham
12:30 GMT	Cairney 32'; Piazon 45'; Targett (yellow card) 86'; Mitrović (yellow card) 90+3'	Report	Luongo 45+3', (yellow card) 49'; Wszołek 81'; Cousins (yellow card) 89'; Lynch (yellow card) 90+3'	Stadium: Craven Cottage; Attendance: 23,347; Referee: Chris Kavanagh

30 March 2018 39	Reading	1–0	Queens Park Rangers	Reading
17:30 BST	Aluko 13', (yellow card) 90'; Martin (yellow card) 21'; Kermorgant (yellow card) 70' (red card) 81'	Report	Bidwell (yellow card) 57'; Freeman (yellow card) 69'; Lynch (yellow card) 82'	Stadium: Madejski Stadium; Attendance: 20,273; Referee: David Coote

2 April 2018 40	Queens Park Rangers	4–1	Norwich City	Shepherd's Bush, London
15:00 BST	Luongo 39', (yellow card) 41'; Smith 55'; Lynch (yellow card) 56'; Eze 60'; Manning 80'	Report	Manning 38' (o.g.); Husband (yellow card) 41'; Vrancic (yellow card) 68'; Hanley (yellow card) 77'; Zimmermann (yellow card) 80'	Stadium: Loftus Road; Attendance: 14,053; Referee: James Linington

7 April 2018 41	Hull City	4–0	Queens Park Rangers	Kingston upon Hull
15:00 BST	Bowen (yellow card) 30'; Wilson 42'; Smithies 45+4' (o.g.); Grosicki 62'; Hernández 69'; Irvine (yellow card) 81'; Henriksen (yellow card) 90+1'	Report	Bidwell (yellow card) 30'; Onuoha (red card) 90'; Scowen (yellow card) 90+1'	Stadium: KCOM Stadium; Attendance: 14,181; Referee: Geoff Eltringham

10 April 2018 42	Queens Park Rangers	4–2	Sheffield Wednesday	Shepherd's Bush, London
19:45 BST	Smyth 8'; Bidwell 10'; Sylla 15' 53'; Scowen (yellow card) 40'	Report	Forestieri 61'; Nuhiu 69'; Pudil (yellow card) 86'	Stadium: Loftus Road; Attendance: 12,521; Referee: Oliver Langford

14 April 2018 43	Queens Park Rangers	1–2	Preston North End	Shepherd's Bush, London
15:00 BST	Smith 13'; Ingram (yellow card) 38'; Robinson (yellow card) 70'; Luongo (yellow card) 83'	Report	Cunningham (yellow card) 41'; Robinson 45', 74'	Stadium: Loftus Road; Attendance: 13,760; Referee: Robert Jones

21 April 2018 44	Brentford	2–1	Queens Park Rangers	Brentford, London
15:00 BST	Canos 16'; Woods (yellow card) 26'; Watkins (yellow card) 33'; Jozefzoon 16'	Report	Ingram (yellow card) 42'; Sylla 45+2' (yellow card) 52'; Bidwell (yellow card) 50'; Scowen (yellow card) 52'	Stadium: Griffin Park; Attendance: 12,367; Referee: Andy Madley

28 April 2018 45	Queens Park Rangers	3–1	Birmingham City	Shepherd's Bush, London
15:00 BST	Osayi-Samuel 29'; Manning (yellow card) 57'; Chair 70' (yellow card) 87'; Smith 90+2'	Report	Adams 27'; Davis (yellow card) 63'	Stadium: Loftus Road; Attendance: 15,805; Referee: Steve Martin

6 May 2018 46	Leeds United	2–0	Queens Park Rangers	Leeds
12:30 BST	Roofe 30'; Phillips 47' (yellow card) 86'; Alioski (yellow card) 54'; Edmondson (yellow card) 81'	Report	Furlong (yellow card) 63'; Scowen (yellow card) 84'; Bidwell (yellow card) 90+1'	Stadium: Elland Road; Attendance: 30,004; Referee: Darren England

=== Emirates FA Cup ===
Win Draw Loss

In the FA Cup, QPR entered the competition in the third round and were drawn at home against Milton Keynes Dons.

6 January 2018 Third round	Queens Park Rangers	0–1	Milton Keynes Dons (League One)	Shepherd's Bush
15:00 GMT	Freeman (yellow card) 71'	Report	Cissé 60'; Muirhead (yellow card) 66'; McGrandles (yellow card) 70'; Wootton (yellow card) 87'; Nicholls (yellow card) 90+2'	Stadium: Loftus Road Stadium; Attendance: 6,314; Referee: James Linington

=== Carabao Cup ===
On 16 June 2017, QPR were drawn at home against Northampton Town in the first round. Another home tie against Brentford was confirmed for the second round.

Win Draw Loss

8 August 2017 First round	Queens Park Rangers	1–0	Northampton Town (League One)	Shepherd's Bush, London
19:45 BST	Caulker (yellow card) 31'; N'Gbakoto 36'; Manning (yellow card) 44'	Report	Barnett (yellow card) 20' (yellow-red card) 53'; Pierre (yellow card) 45+2'; Smith (yellow card) 90+7'	Stadium: Loftus Road; Attendance: 4,317; Referee: Charles Breakspear

22 August 2017 Second round	Queens Park Rangers	1–4	Brentford (Championship)	Shepherd's Bush, London
19:45 BST	Baptiste (yellow card) 17'; Furlong 43'; Robinson (yellow card) 47'	Report	Borysiuk 10' (o.g.); Egan 19'; Maupay 32'; Clarke 83'	Stadium: Loftus Road; Attendance: 9,719; Referee: Chris Sarginson

== Squad statistics ==
=== Statistics ===
As of 6 May 2018

No.	Pos	Nat	Player	Total		Sky Bet Championship		Carabao Cup		Emirates FA Cup	
No.	Pos	Nat	Player	Apps	Goals	Apps	Goals	Apps	Goals	Apps	Goals
Goalkeepers
1	GK	(England) ENG	Alex Smithies	44	0	42+1	0	0	0	1	0
13	GK	(England) ENG	Matt Ingram	4	0	2	0	2	0	0	0
26	GK	(England) ENG	Joe Lumley	2	0	2	0	0	0	0	0
Defenders
2	DF	(England) ENG	Darnell Furlong	24	1	18+4	0	2	1	0	0
3	DF	(England) ENG	Jake Bidwell	47	2	45+1	2	0	0	1	0
4	DF	(England) ENG	Grant Hall	5	0	1+3	0	0	0	0+1	0
5	DF	(England) ENG	Nedum Onuoha	31	0	28+1	0	1	0	1	0
6	DF	(Wales) WAL	Joel Lynch	25	1	22+3	1	0	0	0	0
18	DF	(England) ENG	Jack Robinson	34	2	29+2	2	2	0	1	0
20	DF	(England) ENG	Alex Baptiste	28	0	26	0	1	0	1	0
24	DF	(England) ENG	James Perch	7	0	6+1	0	0	0	0	0
29	DF	(England) ENG	Osman Kakay	2	0	2	0	0	0	0	0
32	DF	(Finland) FIN	Niko Hämäläinen	0	0	0	0	0	0	0	0
Midfielders
7	MF	(England) ENG	Luke Freeman	47	5	42+2	5	1+1	0	1	0
8	MF	(England) ENG	Jordan Cousins	16	0	13+2	0	0	0	1	0
11	MF	(England) ENG	Josh Scowen	43	1	42	1	0	0	1	0
14	MF	(Republic of Ireland) IRL	Ryan Manning	21	2	10+9	2	2	0	0	0
21	MF	(Australia) AUS	Massimo Luongo	39	6	38+1	6	0	0	0	0
22	MF	(Poland) POL	Paweł Wszołek	37	2	27+8	2	1	0	0+1	0
30	MF	(England) ENG	Eberechi Eze	17	2	8+8	2	0	0	0+1	0
33	MF	(Belgium) BEL	Ilias Chair	7	1	4	1	1+1	0	1	0
34	MF	(Nigeria) NGA	Bright Osayi-Samuel	20	1	6+14	1	0	0	0	0
36	MF	(England) ENG	David Wheeler	9	1	5+4	1	0	0	0	0
Forwards
9	FW	(Northern Ireland) NIR	Conor Washington	34	6	24+9	6	0+1	0	0	0
12	FW	(Scotland) SCO	Jamie Mackie	22	4	16+4	4	0+2	0	0	0
17	FW	(England) ENG	Matt Smith	43	11	17+24	11	1	0	1	0
37	FW	(Northern Ireland) NIR	Paul Smyth	13	2	6+6	2	0	0	1	0
38	FW	(England) ENG	Aramide Oteh	6	1	3+3	1	0	0	0	0
40	FW	(Guinea) GUI	Idrissa Sylla	28	7	13+13	7	2	0	0	0
Out on Loan
19	MF	(England) ENG	Sean Goss	0	0	0	0	0	0	0	0
27	FW	(Republic of Ireland) IRL	Olamide Shodipo	0	0	0	0	0	0	0	0
Left During the Season
15	DF	(England) ENG	Steven Caulker	4	0	2	0	2	0	0	0
16	MF	(Poland) POL	Ariel Borysiuk	2	0	0	0	2	0	0	0
23	MF	(Democratic Republic of the Congo) COD	Yeni N'Gbakoto	6	1	2+3	0	1	1	0	0
25	MF	(Canada) CAN	Michael Petrasso	1	0	0	0	0+1	0	0	0
28	FW	(Republic of Ireland) IRL	Reece Grego-Cox	0	0	0	0	0	0	0	0
35	MF	(Democratic Republic of the Congo) COD	Kazenga LuaLua	8	0	2+6	0	0	0	0	0

=== Goals ===
As of 6 May 2018

Rank	Player	Position	Championship	League Cup	FA Cup	Total
1	(England) Matt Smith	FW	11	0	0	11
2	(Guinea) Idrissa Sylla	FW	7	0	0	7
3	(Northern Ireland) Conor Washington	FW	6	0	0	6
3	(Australia) Massimo Luongo	MF	6	0	0	6
5	(England) Luke Freeman	MF	5	0	0	5
6	(Scotland) Jamie Mackie	FW	4	0	0	4
7	(England) Jake Bidwell	DF	2	0	0	2
7	(England) Jack Robinson	DF	2	0	0	2
7	(Poland) Pawel Wszolek	MF	2	0	0	2
7	(Republic of Ireland) Ryan Manning	MF	2	0	0	2
7	(England) Eberechi Eze	MF	2	0	0	2
7	(Northern Ireland) Paul Smyth	FW	2	0	0	2
13	(Wales) Joel Lynch	DF	1	0	0	1
13	(England) Josh Scowen	MF	1	0	0	1
13	(England) David Wheeler	MF	1	0	0	1
13	(England) Aramide Oteh	FW	1	0	0	1
13	(Belgium) Ilias Chair	MF	1	0	0	1
13	(Nigeria) Bright Osayi-Samuel	MF	1	0	0	1
13	(Democratic Republic of the Congo) Yeni N'Gbakoto	MF	0	1	0	1
13	(England) Darnell Furlong	DF	0	1	0	1
Total			57	2	0	59

=== Clean sheets ===
As of 6 May 2018

Rank	Player	Position	Championship	League Cup	FA Cup	Total
1	(England) Alex Smithies	GK	7	0	0	7
2	(England) Matt Ingram	GK	0	1	0	1
3	(England) Joe Lumley	GK	0	0	0	0
Total			7	1	0	8

=== Disciplinary record ===
As of 6 May 2018

No.	Pos.	Name	Championship		FA Cup		League Cup		Total	
No.	Pos.	Name	Booked	Sent off (straight red)	Booked	Sent off (straight red)	Booked	Sent off (straight red)	Booked	Sent off (straight red)
11	MF	Josh Scowen	13	1	0	0	0	0	13	1
5	DF	Nedum Onouha	3	1	0	0	0	0	3	1
20	DF	Alex Baptiste	3	1	0	0	1	0	4	1
12	FW	Jamie Mackie	3	1	0	0	0	0	3	1
14	MF	Ryan Manning	2	1	0	0	1	0	3	1
6	DF	Joel Lynch	11	0	0	0	0	0	11	0
3	DF	Jake Bidwell	10	0	0	0	0	0	10	0
21	MF	Massimo Luongo	10	0	0	0	0	0	10	0
7	MF	Luke Freeman	9	0	1	0	0	0	10	0
8	MF	Jordan Cousins	4	0	0	0	0	0	4	0
18	DF	Jack Robinson	3	0	0	0	1	0	4	0
17	FW	Matt Smith	3	0	0	0	0	0	3	0
2	DF	Darnell Furlong	2	0	0	0	0	0	2	0
13	GK	Matt Ingram	2	0	0	0	0	0	2	0
15	DF	Steven Caulker	1	0	0	0	1	0	2	0
22	MF	Paweł Wszołek	2	0	0	0	0	0	2	0
40	FW	Idrissa Sylla	2	0	0	0	0	0	2	0
1	GK	Alex Smithies	1	0	0	0	0	0	1	0
24	DF	James Perch	1	0	0	0	0	0	1	0
33	MF	Ilias Chair	1	0	0	0	0	0	1	0
37	FW	Paul Smyth	1	0	0	0	0	0	1	0
Total			87	5	1	0	4	0	92	5
