= 2016–17 Queens Park Rangers F.C. season =

English football club season

Queens Park Rangers
2016–17 season
- Owner: Tune Group
- Co-chairmen: Tony Fernandes; Ruben Gnanalingam
- Manager: Jimmy Floyd Hasselbaink (until 5 November); Ian Holloway (from 11 November)
- Stadium: Loftus Road
- EFL Championship: 18th
- FA Cup: Third Round
- EFL Cup: Third Round
- Top goalscorer: League: Idrissa Sylla (10); All: Idrissa Sylla (10)
- Highest home attendance: 17,404 (vs Newcastle United, 13 September 2016)
- Lowest home attendance: 11,635 (vs Barnsley, 7 March 2017)
- Average home league attendance: 14,616
- Biggest win: 5-1 Vs Rotherham United (18 March 2017)
- Biggest defeat: 0-6 Vs Newcastle United (3 September 2016)
Home colours	Away colours	Third colours

The 2016–17 season is Queens Park Rangers' second consecutive season in the Championship following their relegation from the Premier League in the 2014–15 season and their 135th year in existence. Along with the Championship, the club will participate in the FA Cup and the Football League Cup.

== Players ==
=== First team squad ===
No.	Name	Nat	Position	Since	Date of birth (age)	Signed from	Games	Goals
Goalkeepers
1	Alex Smithies	(England)	GK	2015	5 March 1990 (age 36)	(England) Huddersfield Town	64	0
13	Matt Ingram	(England)	GK	2016	18 December 1993 (age 32)	(England) Wycombe Wanderers	4	0
Defenders
3	Jake Bidwell	(England)	LB	2016	21 March 1993 (age 33)	(England) Brentford	36	0
4	Grant Hall	(England)	CB/RB	2015	29 October 1991 (age 34)	(England) Tottenham Hotspur	73	0
5	Nedum Onuoha (C)	(England) (Note: Onuoha was born in Warri, Nigeria, but was raised in England and has represented them at U-20 and U-21 level.)	CB/RB	2012	12 November 1986 (age 39)	(England) Manchester City	178	7
6	Joel Lynch	(Wales) (Note: Lynch was born in Eastbourne, England, but also qualifies to represent Wales internationally through his father and made his international debut for Wales in August 2012.)	CB/LB	2016	3 October 1987 (age 38)	(England) Huddersfield Town	30	3
18	Jack Robinson	(England)	LB	2014	1 September 1993 (age 33)	(England) Liverpool	8	0
22	Steven Caulker	(England)	CB	2014	29 December 1991 (age 34)	(Wales) Cardiff City	48	3
24	James Perch	(England)	RB/CB/DM	2015	28 September 1985 (age 40)	(England) Wigan Athletic	67	0
29	Darnell Furlong	(England)	RB/CB	2015	31 October 1995 (age 30)	(England) Queens Park Rangers Academy	17	0
38	Niko Hämäläinen	(Finland) (Note: Hämäläinen was born in Florida, United States, but also qualifies to represent Finland internationally through his father and has represented them at U-18, U-19, and U-21 level.)	LB/CB	2016	5 March 1997 (age 29)	(England) Queens Park Rangers Academy	3	0
Midfielders
2	Luke Freeman	(England)	AM/RM/LM	2017	22 March 1992 (age 34)	(England) Bristol City	16	2
8	Jordan Cousins	(England)	CM/RM/LM	2016	6 March 1994 (age 32)	(England) Charlton Athletic	18	0
10	Sean Goss	(England) (Note: Goss was born in Wegberg, Germany, but was raised in England from the age of 8.)	CM/LM/LB	2017	1 October 1995 (age 30)	(England) Manchester United	6	0
12	Jamie Mackie	(Scotland) (Note: Mackie was born in Dorking, England, but also qualifies to represent Scotland internationally through his grandfather and made his international debut for Scotland in October 2010.)	RW/LW/CF	2015	22 September 1985 (age 40)	(England) Nottingham Forest	118	20
15	Paweł Wszołek	(Poland)	RW/LW/RB	2016	30 April 1992 (age 34)	(Italy) Hellas Verona	29	3
16	Michael Doughty	(Wales) (Note: Doughty was born in Westminster, England, but also qualifies to represent Wales internationally and has represented them at U-19 and U-21 level.)	CM/LM/LB	2010	20 November 1992 (age 33)	(England) Queens Park Rangers Academy	12	0
20	Karl Henry	(England)	DM/CM	2013	26 November 1982 (age 43)	(England) Wolverhampton Wanderers	112	2
21	Massimo Luongo	(Australia)	CM/AM/DM	2015	25 September 1992 (age 33)	(England) Swindon Town	65	1
23	Yeni Ngbakoto	(Democratic Republic of the Congo) (Note: Ngbakoto was born in Croix, France, and has represented them at U-17 and U-18 level, but also qualifies to represent DR Congo internationally and made his international debut for DR Congo in March 2017.)	RW/LW/CF	2016	23 January 1992 (age 34)	(France) Metz	26	3
25	Michael Petrasso	(Canada)	RW/LW	2013	9 July 1995 (age 31)	(England) Queens Park Rangers Academy	11	0
28	Kazenga LuaLua	(Democratic Republic of the Congo)	LW/RW	2017	10 December 1990 (age 35)	On loan from (England) Brighton & Hove Albion	11	1
30	Josh Bowler	(England)	CM	2016	5 March 1999 (age 27)	(England) Queens Park Rangers Academy	1	0
37	Chris Paul	(Northern Ireland)	CM	2016	25 September 1997 (age 28)	(England) Tottenham Hotspur	0	0
41	Ryan Manning	(Republic of Ireland)	CM	2015	14 June 1996 (age 30)	(Republic of Ireland) Galway United	18	1
49	Ravel Morrison	(England)	CM/AM/DM	2017	2 February 1993 (age 33)	On loan from (Italy) Lazio	5	0
Forwards
9	Conor Washington	(Northern Ireland) (Note: Washington was born in Chatham, England, but also qualifies to represent Scotland internationally through his mother and Northern Ireland through his grandmother and made his international debut for Northern Ireland in March 2016.)	CF/RW/LW	2016	18 May 1992 (age 34)	(England) Peterborough United	55	7
17	Matt Smith	(England)	CF	2017	7 June 1989 (age 37)	(England) Fulham	16	4
35	Reece Grego-Cox	(Republic of Ireland) (Note: Grego-Cox was born in Hammersmith and Fulham, England, but also qualifies to represent the Republic of Ireland internationally through his grandparents and has represented them at U-17, U-19, and U-21 level.)	CF	2015	12 November 1996 (age 29)	(England) Queens Park Rangers Academy	5	0
39	Eberechi Eze	(England)	CF	2016	29 June 1998 (age 28)	(England) Millwall	0	0
40	Idrissa Sylla	(Guinea)	CF/RW/LW	2016	3 December 1990 (age 35)	(Belgium) Anderlecht	32	10

== Kit ==
Dryworld became manufacturers of QPR's kit. Bookmaker smarkets became kit sponsors.

Home	Away	Third	Anniversary

The 2016/17 kits were revealed on 29 June 2016 and was streamed live on QPR's official Facebook Channel.

=== Kit information ===
QPR agreed a 10-year multimillion-pound eight figure deal with Dryworld to replace Nike as the official technical kit suppliers from the 2016/17 season.

The club confirmed a one-year deal with Smarkets as the new shirt sponsor for the 2016/17 season, the brand will be displayed on the home, away and third strips.

== New contracts ==
No.	Pos	Player	Contract length	Contract end	Date	Source
—	GK	(England) Martin Herdman	1 year	2017	Unknown (Note: The date of Herdman's contract extension is unknown as it was not reported; however, he signed a one-year extension on that one-year deal on 26 April 2017.)	N/A
20	MF	(England) Karl Henry	1 year	2017	20 June 2016	
26	GK	(England) Joe Lumley	3 years	2019	30 August 2016	
25	MF	(Canada) Michael Petrasso	1 year	2018	27 October 2016	
34	DF	(England) Osman Kakay	1 year	2018	9 November 2016	
37	MF	(Northern Ireland) Chris Paul	1 year	2018	17 November 2016	
38	DF	(Finland) Niko Hämäläinen	2 years	2019	25 November 2016	
27	MF	(Republic of Ireland) Olamide Shodipo	2.5 years	2019	30 November 2016	
39	FW	(England) Eberechi Eze	2.5 years	2019	6 January 2017	
41	MF	(Republic of Ireland) Ryan Manning	2.5 years	2019	20 January 2017	
29	DF	(England) Darnell Furlong	2.5 years	2019	26 January 2017	
21	MF	(Australia) Massimo Luongo	3.5 years	2020	14 February 2017	
1	GK	(England) Alex Smithies	3.5 years	2020	17 February 2017	
—	DF	(England) Alex Finney	1.5 years	2018	9 March 2017	
—	MF	(Australia) Joshua Wallen	1 year	2018	11 April 2017	
—	GK	(England) Conor Hudnott	1 year	2018	13 April 2017	
—	GK	(England) Martin Herdman	1 year	2018	26 April 2017	
—	DF	(England) Jack Williams	1 year	2018	2 May 2017	
—	MF	(Belgium) Ilias Chair (Note: Chair was born in Belgium, but also qualifies to represent Morocco internationally and has trained with the Morocco national under-20 football team.)	1 year	2018	5 May 2017	

== Transfers ==
=== Transfers in ===
No.	Date from	Position	Nationality	Name	From	Fee	Ref.
3	1 July 2016	LB	(England)	Jake Bidwell	Brentford	Undisclosed	
7	1 July 2016	DM	(Poland)	Ariel Borysiuk	Legia Warsaw	£1,500,000	
—	1 July 2016	GK	(England)	Conor Hudnott	Academy	Trainee	
6	1 July 2016	CB	(Wales)	Joel Lynch	Huddersfield Town	£1,200,000	
37	1 July 2016	CM	(Northern Ireland)	Chris Paul	Tottenham Hotspur	Free transfer	
8	13 July 2016	CM	(England)	Jordan Cousins	Charlton Athletic	£1,250,000	
39	3 August 2016	AM	(England)	Eberechi Eze	Millwall	Free transfer	
23	7 August 2016	RW	(Democratic Republic of the Congo)	Yeni Ngbakoto	Metz	Undisclosed	
—	26 August 2016	GK	(Switzerland)	Seny Dieng	MSV Duisburg	Free transfer	
40	30 August 2016	CF	(Guinea)	Idrissa Sylla	Anderlecht	Undisclosed	
—	18 November 2016	CB	(England)	Alex Finney	Bolton Wanderers	Free transfer	
—	9 January 2017	CF	(England)	Danny Rowe	Leicester City	Free transfer	
—	22 January 2017	CF	(England)	Brandon Adams	Academy	Trainee	
10	28 January 2017	CM	(England)	Sean Goss	Manchester United	£500,000	
2	30 January 2017	AM	(England)	Luke Freeman	Bristol City	£350,000	
17	31 January 2017	CF	(England)	Matt Smith	Fulham	£1,000,000	
15	31 January 2017	RW	(Poland)	Paweł Wszołek	Hellas Verona	Undisclosed	
—	31 January 2017	AM	(Belgium)	Ilias Chair	Lierse	Unknown	
—	15 February 2017	RW	(England)	Josh Bowler	Academy	Trainee	
—	21 February 2017	GK	(Poland)	Marcin Brzozowski	Academy	Trainee	
—	27 March 2017	CF	(England)	Dan Darbyshire	Academy	Trainee	
—	26 April 2017	CF	(Nigeria)	Odysseus Alfa	Academy	Trainee	
—	5 May 2017	CF	(England)	Aramide Oteh	Tottenham Hotspur	Free transfer	

=== Loans in ===
No.	Date from	Position	Nationality	Name	From	Until	Ref.
15	31 August 2016	RW	(Poland)	Paweł Wszołek	Hellas Verona	31 January 2017 (Note: On 31 January 2017, Wszołek's loan became permanent.)	
28	10 January 2017	LW	(Democratic Republic of the Congo)	Kazenga LuaLua	Brighton & Hove Albion	End of Season	
—	18 January 2017	CF	(England)	Aramide Oteh (work experience)	Tottenham Hotspur	27 February 2017	
49	31 January 2017	CM	(England)	Ravel Morrison	Lazio	End of Season	

=== Transfers out ===
No.	Date from	Position	Nationality	Name	To	Fee	Ref.
—	1 July 2016	CM	(England)	Michael Anastasiou	Free agent	Released	
—	1 July 2016	CF	(England)	Tyler Blackwood	Arizona United	Free transfer	
—	1 July 2016	CM	(England)	George Butler	Team Solent (Note: Following Butler's release he joined Team Solent.)	Free transfer	
—	1 July 2016	CF	(Republic of Ireland)	Nathan Corkery	Wealdstone (Note: Following Corkery's release he joined Wealdstone.)	Free transfer	
32	1 July 2016	DM	(Mali) (Note: Diakité was born in Montfermeil, France, but also qualifies to represent Mali internationally and made his international debut for Mali in January 2012.)	Samba Diakité	Red Star (Note: Following Diakité's release he joined Red Star.)	Free transfer	
—	1 July 2016	CM	(Republic of Ireland)	Leo Donnellan	Dagenham & Redbridge	Free transfer	
18	1 July 2016	CM	(Argentina)	Alejandro Faurlín	Getafe (Note: Following Faurlín's release he joined Getafe.)	Free transfer	
—	1 July 2016	CB	(England)	Addison Garnett	Crawley Town (Note: Following Garnett's release he joined Crawley Town.)	Free transfer	
17	1 July 2016	CM	(England)	Oscar Gobern	Mansfield Town (Note: Following Gobern's release he joined Mansfield Town.)	Free transfer	
1	1 July 2016	GK	(England)	Robert Green	Leeds United (Note: Following Green's release he joined Leeds United.)	Free transfer	
—	1 July 2016	RB	(Australia)	James Haran	Kettering Town (Note: Following Haran's release he joined Kettering Town.)	Free transfer	
6	1 July 2016	CB	(England)	Clint Hill	Rangers (Note: Following Hill's release he joined Rangers.)	Free transfer	
23	1 July 2016	RW	(Canada)	Junior Hoilett	Cardiff City (Note: Following Hoilett's release he joined Cardiff City.)	Free transfer	
—	1 July 2016	CM	(Cyprus)	Andreas Komodikis	St Albans City (Note: Following Komodikis' release he joined St Albans City.)	Free transfer	
—	1 July 2016	RB	(England)	Leon Lobjoit	Buckingham Town (Note: Following Lobjoit's release he joined Buckingham Town.)	Free transfer	
—	1 July 2016	DF	(England)	Tom Matthews	The New Saints	Free transfer	
—	1 July 2016	CM	(England)	Aaron Mitchell (Note: Later known as Aaron Lamont)	Hampton & Richmond Borough (Note: Following Mitchell's release he joined Hampton & Richmond Borough.)	Free transfer	
—	1 July 2016	LW	(Republic of Ireland)	Jake Mulraney	Inverness Caledonian Thistle (Note: Following Mulraney's release he joined Inverness Caledonian Thistle.)	Free transfer	
—	1 July 2016	AM	(England)	Joseph N'Guessan	Maidstone United (Note: Following N'Guessan's release he joined Maidstone United.)	Free transfer	
—	1 July 2016	CM	(England)	Callum O'Sullivan	Ashford Town (Middlesex) (Note: Following O'Sullivan's release he joined Ashford Town (Middlesex).)	Free transfer	
—	1 July 2016	CF	(England)	Ben Pattie	Folkestone Invicta (Note: Following Pattie's release he joined Folkestone Invicta.)	Free transfer	
—	1 July 2016	CM	(Belgium) (Note: Rosenthal was born in London, England, but also qualifies to represent Israel internationally through his father and Belgium, and represented Belgium at U-18 and U-19 level and Israel at U-21 level.)	Tom Rosenthal	FC Dordrecht (Note: Following Rosenthal's release he joined FC Dordrecht.)	Free transfer	
37	1 July 2016	CM	(Republic of Ireland) (Note: Sutherland was born in Hillingdon, England, but also qualifies to represent the Republic of Ireland internationally through his grandmother and represented them at U-17, U-19, and U-21 level.)	Frankie Sutherland	Woking (Note: Following Sutherland's release he joined Woking.)	Free transfer	
3	1 July 2016	LB	(Senegal) (Note: Traoré was born in Chatenay-Malabry, France, and represented them at U-17, U-18, U-19, and U-21 level, but also qualifies to represent Senegal internationally and made his international debut for Senegal in August 2011.)	Armand Traoré	Nottingham Forest (Note: Following Traoré's release he joined Nottingham Forest.)	Free transfer	
—	1 July 2016	CB	(England)	Harly Wise	Hemel Hempstead Town (Note: Following Wise's release he joined Hemel Hempstead Town.)	Free transfer	
22	1 July 2016	LB	(South Korea)	Yun Suk-young	Brøndby (Note: Following Yun's release he joined Brøndby.)	Free transfer	
10	5 July 2016	CM	(Netherlands)	Leroy Fer	Swansea City	Undisclosed	
7	6 July 2016	RW	(Scotland) (Note: Phillips was born in Aylesbury, England, and represented them at U-19 and U-21 level, but also qualifies to represent Scotland internationally through his grandparents and made his international debut for Scotland in May 2012.)	Matt Phillips	West Bromwich Albion	£5,500,000	
32	31 August 2016	DF	(England)	Cole Kpekawa	Barnsley	£400,000	
28	31 August 2016	CM	(Hungary)	Dániel Tőzsér	Debrecen (Note: Following Tőzsér's release he joined Debrecen.)	Free transfer	
17	10 January 2017	CF	(Germany)	Sebastian Polter	Union Berlin	Undisclosed	
30	11 January 2017	CM	(Brazil)	Sandro	Antalyaspor	Undisclosed	
10	24 January 2017	AM	(Netherlands)	Tjaronn Chery	Guizhou Hengfeng Zhicheng	Undisclosed	

=== Loans out ===
No.	Date from	Position	Nationality	Name	To	Until	Ref.
16	5 August 2016	CM	(Wales)	Michael Doughty	Swindon Town	2 January 2017 (Note: On 2 January 2017, Michael Doughty was recalled from his loan spell at Swindon Town.)	
14	5 August 2016	CF	(England)	Jay Emmanuel-Thomas	Gillingham	End of Season	
29	12 August 2016	RB	(England)	Darnell Furlong	Swindon Town	2 January 2017 (Note: On 2 January 2017, Darnell Furlong was recalled from his loan spell at Swindon Town.)	
35	31 August 2016	CF	(Republic of Ireland)	Reece Grego-Cox	Newport County	9 January 2017	
36	31 August 2016	CM	(Montserrat) (Note: Comley was born in Islington, England, but also qualifies to represent Montserrat internationally and has been called up by the Montserrat national football team.)	Brandon Comley	Grimsby Town	3 January 2017	
—	21 October 2016	CF	(England)	Brandon Adams (work experience)	Staines Town	22 January 2017	
11	10 January 2017	CM	(England)	Ben Gladwin	Swindon Town	End of Season	
36	13 January 2017	CM	(Montserrat)	Brandon Comley	Grimsby Town	End of Season	
26	18 January 2017	GK	(England)	Joe Lumley	Bristol Rovers	End of Season	
—	22 January 2017	CF	(England)	Brandon Adams	Perlis FA	30 August 2017 (Note: On 30 August 2017, Adams' loan at Perlis FA was cut short from 20 October 2017 to 30 August 2017)	
7	26 January 2017	DM	(Poland)	Ariel Borysiuk	Lechia Gdańsk	End of Season	
27	30 January 2017	LW	(Republic of Ireland)	Olamide Shodipo	Port Vale	End of Season	
33	31 January 2017	AM	(France)	Axel Prohouly	Port Vale	End of Season	
34	31 January 2017	RB	(England)	Osman Kakay	Chesterfield	30 April 2017	
19	31 January 2017	LW	(Netherlands)	Abdenasser El Khayati	ADO Den Haag	End of Season	
—	15 February 2017	RW	(England)	Gianni Crichlow (work experience)	Torquay United	7 March 2017	
—	10 March 2017	LB	(England)	Jack Williams (work experience)	Bishop's Stortford	29 April 2017	

== Friendlies ==
=== Pre-season friendlies ===
On 20 May 2016, QPR confirmed that they would be touring the Netherlands and would be based in the town of Ermelo. During the nine-day training camp which was between the 3 and 12 July 2016, they played two friendly fixtures, one against Dutch Champions, PSV Eindhoven and the other against FC Groningen.

Win Draw Loss

1 July 2016	Aldershot Town	2–3	Queens Park Rangers	Recreation Ground
19:45 BST	Fenelon 22'; Demuria 61'	Report	Shodipo 16'; Emmanuel-Thomas 32', 34'

5 July 2016	Fc Oss	v	Queens Park Rangers
				Attendance: 0

8 July 2016	PSV Eindhoven (Netherlands)	0–1	Queens Park Rangers	De Herdgang
15:30 CEST		Report	Polter 51' (pen.)	Attendance: 0

11 July 2016	FC Groningen (Netherlands)	3–1	Queens Park Rangers	De Langeleegte
19:00 CEST	Bacuna 13'; Kpekawa 64' (o.g.); Hoesen 75' (pen.)	Report	Emmanuel-Thomas 65'

19 July 2016	Northampton Town	1–1	Queens Park Rangers	Sixfields Stadium
19:30 BST	Revell 86'	Report	El Khayati 80'	Attendance: 2,423 (663 QPR Fans)

22 July 2016	Wycombe Wanderers	0–0	Queens Park Rangers	Adams Park
19:45 BST		Report		Attendance: 2,575 (1,007 QPR Fans)

26 July 2016	Burton Albion	1–1	Queens Park Rangers	Burton upon Trent
19:45 BST	Beavon 57'	Report	Onuoha 36'	Stadium: Pirelli Stadium

30 July 2016	Queens Park Rangers	2–0	Watford	Loftus Road
15:00 BST	Polter 20'; Washington 83'	Report		Attendance: 4,200 (1,200 Watford)

== Competitions ==
=== Overview ===
Competition	Record							
Competition	G	W	D	L	GF	GA	GD	Win %
Championship	46	15	8	23	52	66	−14	32.61
FA Cup	1	0	0	1	1	2	−1	0.00
League Cup	3	2	0	1	5	5	+0	66.67
Total	48	16	8	24	56	69	−13	33.33

Source: Competitions

=== Sky Bet Championship ===
==== League table ====
Pos	Team	Pld	W	D	L	GF	GA	GD	Pts
16	Ipswich Town	46	13	16	17	48	58	−10	55
17	Bristol City	46	15	9	22	60	66	−6	54
18	Queens Park Rangers	46	15	8	23	52	66	−14	53
19	Birmingham City	46	13	14	19	45	64	−19	53
20	Burton Albion	46	13	13	20	49	63	−14	52

Source: English Football League, Soccerway
Rules for classification: 1) Points; 2) Goal difference; 3) Number of goals scored; 4) Points in head-to-head matches; 5) Goal difference in head-to-head matches; 6) Goals scored in head-to-head matches; 7) Play-off.

==== Results summary ====
Overall								Home						Away					
Pld	W	D	L	GF	GA	GD	Pts	W	D	L	GF	GA	GD	W	D	L	GF	GA	GD
46	15	8	23	52	66	−14	53	9	4	9	29	30	−1	6	4	14	23	36	−13

Last updated: 7 May 2017.
Source: Championship

==== Results by matchday ====
Matchday	1	2	3	4	5	6	7	8	9	10	11	12	13	14	15	16	17	18	19	20	21	22	23	24	25	26	27	28	29	30	31	32	33	34	35	36	37	38	39	40	41	42	43	44	45	46
Ground	H	A	A	H	A	H	H	A	H	A	A	H	H	A	H	A	H	A	H	A	H	H	A	A	H	A	H	H	A	A	H	A	H	A	H	H	A	H	A	A	H	A	H	A	H	A
Result	W	W	L	L	W	D	L	L	D	D	W	D	W	L	L	D	W	L	L	L	L	L	L	W	W	W	D	L	D	L	L	W	W	L	W	W	D	W	L	L	L	L	L	L	W	L
Position	2	1	5	6	5	7	14	16	16	16	13	13	9	13	13	17	13	15	15	18	18	19	20	19	17	17	17	17	18	19	19	16	15	16	16	14	15	15	15	16	16	16	16	19	17	18

Updated to match(es) played on 7 May 2017. Source: statto.com
A = Away; H = Home; W = Win; D = Draw; L = Loss

==== Matches ====
Win Draw Loss

The fixtures for the 2016–17 season were announced on 22 June 2016 at 9am.

7 August 2016 1	Queens Park Rangers	3–0	Leeds United	Shepherd's Bush
12:00 BST	Onuoha 4'; Gladwin (yellow card) 25'; Bidwell (yellow card) 31'; Chery 72' (pen.); Polter 90+4'	Report	Grimes (yellow card) 57'	Stadium: Loftus Road; Attendance: 16,764; Referee: Oliver Langford

14 August 2016 2	Cardiff City	0–2	Queens Park Rangers	Cardiff
15:00 BST	Ralls (yellow card) 90+4'	Report	Onuoha (yellow card) 8'; Chery (yellow card) 21' (goal) 85' (pen.); Luongo (yellow card) 61'; Caulker 76'; Henry (yellow card) 86'	Stadium: Cardiff City Stadium; Attendance: 15,869; Referee: James Linington

18 August 2016 3	Barnsley	3–2	Queens Park Rangers	Barnsley
19:45 BST	Watkins 4'; Roberts (yellow card) 46'; Hourihane 77'; Scowen 89'	Report	Chery 47' (pen.); Hall (yellow card) 61' (yellow-red card) 90+5'; Polter 74' (pen.); Onuoha (yellow card) 90+3'	Stadium: Oakwell; Attendance: 11,613; Referee: Darren Bond

20 August 2016 4	Queens Park Rangers	0–2	Preston North End	Shepherd's Bush
15:00 BST	Perch (yellow card) 45+1'	Report	Beckford 21'; Onuoha 52' (o.g.); Welsh (yellow card) 58'	Stadium: Loftus Road; Attendance: 13,307; Referee: Andy Madley

27 August 2016 5	Wigan Athletic	0–1	Queens Park Rangers	Wigan
15:00 BST	Powell (yellow card) 43'; MacDonald (yellow card) 51'; Jacobs (yellow card) 66'; Morgan (yellow card) 82'	Report	Cousins (yellow card) 13'; Bidwell (yellow card) 38'; Henry (yellow card) 42'; Onuoha 48'	Stadium: DW Stadium; Attendance: 10,606; Referee: Chris Kavanagh

10 September 2016 6	Queens Park Rangers	1–1	Blackburn Rovers	Shepherd's Bush
15:00 BST	Shodipo (yellow card) 50'; Perch (yellow card) 61'; Chery 65'	Report	Williams (yellow card) 42'; Akpan (yellow card) 47'; Gallagher 73'	Stadium: Loftus Road; Attendance: 13,210; Referee: Keith Stroud

13 September 2016 7	Queens Park Rangers	0–6	Newcastle United	Shepherd's Bush
19:45 BST		Report	Shelvey 12', 48'; Pérez 30'; Clark 56'; Mitrović 63'; Hanley 79'	Stadium: Loftus Road Stadium; Attendance: 17,404; Referee: Andy Davies

17 September 2016 8	Huddersfield Town	2–1	Queens Park Rangers	Huddersfield
15:00 BST	Palmer 14'; Hogg (yellow card) 21'; Hudson (yellow card) 42'; Kachunga 62'	Report	Chery (yellow card) 21'; Sylla 76' (yellow card) 90+3'; Polter (yellow card) 87'; Borysiuk (yellow card) 90+1'	Stadium: John Smith's Stadium; Attendance: 20,595; Referee: Simon Hooper

24 September 2016 9	Queens Park Rangers	1–1	Birmingham City	Shepherd's Bush
15:00 BST	Shodipo (yellow card) 35'; Caulker 39'; Hall (yellow card) 90'	Report	Jutkiewicz 23'; Kieftenbeld (yellow card) 68'	Stadium: Loftus Road Stadium; Attendance: 13,693; Referee: Paul Tierney

27 September 2016 10	Burton Albion	1–1	Queens Park Rangers	Burton-upon-Trent
19:45 BST	Ward (yellow card) 25' (goal) 58'; Turner (yellow card) 38'	Report	Washington (yellow card) 27'; Bidwell (yellow card) 51'; Polter 70'	Stadium: Pirelli Stadium; Attendance: 3,725; Referee: Scott Duncan

1 October 2016 11	Fulham	1–2	Queens Park Rangers	Fulham
12:45 BST	Ream 47' (yellow card) 83'; Malone (yellow card) 58'	Report	Caulker (yellow card) 5'; Washington 20'; Henry (yellow card) 74'; Sylla 87' (yellow card) 90+6'	Stadium: Craven Cottage; Attendance: 19,609; Referee: Lee Mason

15 October 2016 12	Queens Park Rangers	1–1	Reading	Shepherd's Bush
15:00 BST	Wszołek 14'; Lynch (yellow card) 49'	Report	Williams 21' van den Berg (yellow card) 46'	Stadium: Loftus Road; Attendance: 15,048; Referee: Steve Martin

18 October 2016 13	Queens Park Rangers	1–0	Bristol City	Shepherd's Bush
19:45 BST	Sylla 75'	Report	Tomlin (yellow card) 61'	Stadium: Loftus Road Stadium; Attendance: 12,552; Referee: Andrew Madley

22 October 2016 14	Sheffield Wednesday	1–0	Queens Park Rangers	Owlerton, Sheffield
15:00 BST	Hooper 40'; Pudil (yellow card) 77'	Report	Borysiuk (yellow card) 13'; Gladwin (yellow card) 17'; Onuoha (yellow card) 85'; Hämäläinen (yellow card) 90+1'	Stadium: Hillsborough Stadium; Attendance: 25903; Referee: Chris Kavanagh

28 October 2016 15	Queens Park Rangers	0–2	Brentford	Shepherd's Bush
19:45 BST	Borysiuk (yellow card) 18'; Chery (yellow card) 74'	Report	Dean (yellow card) 6'; Clarke 42'; Sawyers 74'	Stadium: Loftus Road Stadium; Attendance: 16,888; Referee: James Adcock

5 November 2016 16	Nottingham Forest	1–1	Queens Park Rangers	Nottingham
15:00 GMT	Assombalonga 38'; Worrall (yellow card) 50'; Stojković (yellow card) 61'; Pereira (yellow card) 66' (yellow-red card) 71'; Cohen (yellow card) 69'; Lichaj (yellow card) 90+3'	Report	Henry (yellow card) 11' (yellow-red card) 34'; Robinson (yellow card) 67'; Sylla 85' (yellow card) 86'	Stadium: The City Ground; Attendance: 20,043; Referee: Keith Stroud

19 November 2016 17	Queens Park Rangers	2–1	Norwich City	Shepherd's Bush
15:00 GMT	Washington 21'; Polter 27'; Lynch (yellow card) 80'	Report	Martin Olsson (red card) 2'; Tettey (yellow card) 2'; Naismith (yellow card) 37' (goal) 78'; Dorrans (yellow card) 45+3'	Stadium: Loftus Road Stadium; Attendance: 17,187; Referee: Scott Duncan

26 November 2016 18	Ipswich Town	3–0	Queens Park Rangers	Ipswich
15:00 GMT	Ward 13'; Varney 54'; Lawrence 61' (yellow card) 71'	Report	Perch (yellow card) 25'; Chery (yellow card) 71'	Stadium: Portman Road Stadium; Attendance: 16,510; Referee: Andy Woolmer

1 December 2016 19	Queens Park Rangers	1–2	Wolverhampton Wanderers	Shepherd's Bush
19:45 GMT	Perch (yellow card) 11' (yellow-red card) 35'; Luongo (yellow card) 51'; Lynch 90'	Report	Cavaleiro (yellow card) 49'; Edwards 60'; Costa 67'; Batth (yellow card) 78'; Saïss (yellow card) 90+1'	Stadium: Loftus Road Stadium; Attendance: 12,222; Referee: Tim Robinson

10 December 2016 20	Rotherham United	1–0	Queens Park Rangers	Rotherham
15:00 GMT	Brown 24'; Adeyemi (yellow card) 50'; Frecklington (yellow card) 83'; Forde (yellow card) 87'	Report	Ngbakoto (yellow card) 45+3'; Luongo (yellow card) 48'; Polter (yellow card) 73'	Stadium: New York Stadium; Attendance: 8,704; Referee: Jeremy Simpson

14 December 2016 21	Queens Park Rangers	0–1	Derby County	Shepherd's Bush
19:45 GMT		Report	Butterfield (yellow card) 17'; Baird (yellow card) 26'; Ince 86'	Stadium: Loftus Road Stadium; Attendance: 12,371; Referee: David Coote

18 December 2016 22	Queens Park Rangers	0–1	Aston Villa	Shepherd's Bush
12:00 GMT	Luongo (yellow card) 81'	Report	Kodjia (penalty missed) 31' 75'; Jedinak (yellow card) 43'; Chester (yellow card) 63'; Bunn (yellow card) 90+3'	Stadium: Loftus Road Stadium; Attendance: 16,285; Referee: Geoff Eltringham

27 December 2016 23	Brighton & Hove Albion	3–0	Queens Park Rangers	Falmer
12:30 GMT	Baldock 11'; Murray 53' (pen.); Knockaert 69'	Report	Onuoha (red card) 56'; Sylla (yellow card) 80'	Stadium: Falmer Stadium; Attendance: 30,176; Referee: Keith Stroud

31 December 2016 24	Wolverhampton Wanderers	1–2	Queens Park Rangers	Wolverhampton
15:00 GMT	Price (yellow card) 32'; Edwards 61'	Report	Sylla 53'; Manning (yellow card) 65'; Bidwell (yellow card) 66'; Perch (yellow card) 77'; Wszołek 87'	Stadium: Molineux Stadium; Attendance: 21,132; Referee: Lee Probert

2 January 2017 25	Queens Park Rangers	2–1	Ipswich Town	Shepherd's Bush
15:00 GMT	Sylla 30'; Wszołek 83'	Report	Lawrence 48'	Stadium: Loftus Road; Attendance: 15,136; Referee: Tony Harrington

12 January 2017 26	Reading	0–1	Queens Park Rangers	Reading
20:00 GMT (UTC)	Moore (yellow card) 85' van den Berg (yellow card) 89'	Report	Mackie 28' (yellow card) 33'; Wszołek (yellow card) 87'	Stadium: Madejski Stadium; Attendance: 12,655; Referee: Oliver Langford

21 January 2017 27	Queens Park Rangers	1–1	Fulham	Shepherd's Bush
12:30 GMT	Furlong (yellow card) 23'; Manning 25' (yellow card) 50'; Luongo (yellow card) 40'; Sylla (yellow card) 61'; Lynch (yellow card) 90+6'	Report	Martin (penalty missed) 6' 75' (yellow card) 90+6'; Fredericks (yellow card) 36'; Cairney (yellow card) 90+5'	Stadium: Loftus Road Stadium; Attendance: 17,025; Referee: Keith Stroud

28 January 2017 28	Queens Park Rangers	1–2	Burton Albion	Shepherd's Bush
15:00 GMT	Washington 63'; Luongo (yellow card) 86'	Report	Murphy 11'; Christensen (yellow card) 48'; Dyer 52'; Irvine (yellow card) 78'	Stadium: Loftus Road Stadium; Attendance: 12,116; Referee: Geoff Eltringham

1 February 2017 29	Newcastle United	2–2	Queens Park Rangers	Newcastle
19:45 GMT	Shelvey 1'; Ritchie 54' (yellow card) 89'	Report	Perch (yellow card) 40'; Washington 44'; Clark 90' (o.g.)	Stadium: St James' Park; Attendance: 47,907; Referee: Tim Robinson

4 February 2017 30	Blackburn Rovers	1–0	Queens Park Rangers	Blackburn
15:00 GMT	Gallagher 90+1'	Report	Perch (yellow card) 59'; Manning (yellow card) 80'; Furlong (yellow card) 90+1'	Stadium: Ewood Park; Attendance: 10,846; Referee: Tony Harrington

11 February 2017 31	Queens Park Rangers	1–2	Huddersfield Town	Shepherd's Bush
15:00 GMT	Manning (yellow card) 45+1'; Hall (yellow card) 58'; Freeman 60'; Luongo (yellow card) 85'	Report	Brown 26' (yellow card) 72'; Wells 36'	Stadium: Loftus Road; Attendance: 14,044; Referee: Peter Bankes

18 February 2017 32	Birmingham City	1–4	Queens Park Rangers	Birmingham
15:00 GMT	Tesche (yellow card) 21'; Robinson (yellow card) 56'; Storer (yellow card) 87'; Nsue 90+2'	Report	Smith 18'; Washington 47'; Lynch (yellow card) 50'; Bidwell (yellow card) 82'; Sylla 84'; Ngbakoto 88'; Manning (yellow card) 90+1'	Stadium: St Andrew's; Attendance: 20,265; Referee: Andrew Davies

21 February 2017 33	Queens Park Rangers	2–1	Wigan Athletic	Shepherd's Bush, London
19:45 GMT	Smith 4'; Lynch (yellow card) 15'; Washington 60'; Sylla (yellow card) 76'	Report	Bogle 17' (pen.) (yellow card) 22'; Grigg (yellow card) 30'; Power (yellow card) 35'; Hanson (yellow card) 46'; Buxton (yellow card) 61'	Stadium: Loftus Road; Attendance: 12,101; Referee: James Linington

25 February 2017 34	Preston North End	2–1	Queens Park Rangers	Preston
15:00 GMT	McGeady 45'; Clarke (yellow card) 66'; Hugill 71'	Report	Onuoha (yellow card) 21'; LuaLua 36' (yellow card) 62'; Freeman (yellow card) 41' (yellow-red card) 78'	Stadium: Deepdale; Attendance: 10,848; Referee: David Coote

4 March 2017 35	Queens Park Rangers	2–1	Cardiff City	Shepherd's Bush, London
15:00 GMT	Luongo (yellow card) 40'; Ngbakoto 62'; Richards 83' (o.g.); Perch (yellow card) 88'	Report	Bamba 45'; Morrison (yellow card) 66'	Stadium: Loftus Road; Attendance: 15,103; Referee: Darren England

7 March 2017 36	Queens Park Rangers	2–1	Barnsley	Shepherd's Bush, London
19:45 GMT	Sylla 7'; Perch (yellow card) 14'; MacDonald 66' (o.g.); Bidwell (yellow card) 83'; Manning (yellow card) 87'	Report	Bradshaw 79'; Hammill (yellow card) 85'	Stadium: Loftus Road; Attendance: 11,635; Referee: Tony Harrington

11 March 2017 37	Leeds United	0–0	Queens Park Rangers	Leeds
15:00 GMT	Ayling (yellow card) 35'; Alfonso (yellow card) 48'; Bridcutt (yellow card) 66'; O'Kane (yellow card) 90+3'	Report	Bidwell (yellow card) 87'; Mackie (yellow card) 90+3'	Stadium: Elland Road; Attendance: 30,870; Referee: Tim Robinson

18 March 2017 38	Queens Park Rangers	5–1	Rotherham United	Shepherd's Bush, London
15:00 GMT	Smith 5'; Freeman 15'; Ngbakoto 49' (pen.); Luongo 57'; Onuoha 90+1'	Report	Newell 13'; Belaïd (yellow card) 48'	Stadium: Loftus Road; Attendance: 13,383; Referee: Oliver Langford

31 March 2017 39	Derby County	1–0	Queens Park Rangers	Derby
19:45 BST	Vydra 70'	Report	Freeman (yellow card) 78'	Stadium: iPro Stadium; Attendance: 27,690; Referee: Geoff Eltringham

4 April 2017 40	Aston Villa	1–0	Queens Park Rangers	Birmingham
19:45 BST	Kodjia 5' (yellow card) 87'	Report	Mackie (yellow card) 24'	Stadium: Villa Park; Attendance: 27,154; Referee: Peter Bankes

7 April 2017 41	Queens Park Rangers	1–2	Brighton & Hove Albion	Shepherd's Bush, London
19:45 BST	Smith 74'	Report	Murray 58'; Pocognoli 64' (yellow card) 86'	Stadium: Loftus Road; Attendance: 16,503; Referee: Simon Hooper

14 April 2017 42	Bristol City	2–1	Queens Park Rangers	Bristol
15:00 BST	Pack 14' (yellow card) 86'; Paterson 40'	Report	Manning (yellow card) 35'; Luongo (yellow card) 45+1'; Freeman (yellow card) 53'; Mackie (yellow card) 90+2'; Sylla 90+5'	Stadium: Ashton Gate Stadium; Attendance: 20,404; Referee: Jeremy Simpson

17 April 2017 43	Queens Park Rangers	1–2	Sheffield Wednesday	Shepherd's Bush, London
15:00 BST	Sylla 20'; Perch (yellow card) 76'	Report	Reach 12' (yellow card) 61'; Pudil 31'	Stadium: Loftus Road; Attendance: 15,708; Referee: Andy Davies

22 April 2017 44	Brentford	3–1	Queens Park Rangers	Brentford, London
15:00 BST	Barbet 31'; Jota 60' (pen.), 64' (yellow card) 65'	Report	Freeman (yellow card) 42'; Perch (yellow card) 47'; Lynch (yellow card) 60' (goal) 62'	Stadium: Griffin Park; Attendance: 11,888; Referee: James Adcock

29 April 2017 45	Queens Park Rangers	2–0	Nottingham Forest	Shepherd's Bush, London
15:00 BST	Onuoha (yellow card) 4'; Washington 49'; Manning (yellow card) 58'; Lynch 60'; Perch (yellow card) 80'	Report	Osborn (yellow card) 72'; Vaughan (yellow card) 76'; Ward (yellow card) 80'	Stadium: Loftus Road; Attendance: 16,474; Referee: James Linington

7 May 2017 46	Norwich City	4–0	Queens Park Rangers	Norwich
12:00 BST	Hoolahan 22', 90+1'; Pritchard 60'; Murphy 85'	Report		Stadium: Carrow Road; Attendance: 27,005; Referee: Tim Robinson

=== Emirates FA Cup ===
Win Draw Loss

7 January 2017 Third round	Queens Park Rangers	1–2	Blackburn Rovers (Championship)	Shepherd's Bush
15:00 GMT	Bidwell 61' (pen.)	Report	Lynch 8' (o.g.); Feeney 58'; Marshall (yellow card) 90'	Stadium: Loftus Road Stadium; Attendance: 7,482; Referee: Simon Hooper

=== Carabao Cup ===
Win Draw Loss

10 August 2016 First round	Queens Park Rangers	2–2 (a.e.t.) (4-2 p)	Swindon Town (League One)	Shepherd's Bush
19:45 BST	Perch (yellow card) 57'; Ngbakoto 58'; Henry (yellow card) 90+2'; Washington 93'; Polter (yellow card) 103'	Report	Sendles-White (yellow card) 23'; Stewart 72' (yellow card) 112'; Barry (yellow card) 90+2'; Brophy 107'	Stadium: Loftus Road; Attendance: 5,440; Referee: Tony Harrington
	Penalties
	Chery (penalty scored); Polter (penalty scored); Washington (penalty scored); El Khayati (penalty scored)		Rodgers (penalty missed); Thomas (penalty scored); Stewart (penalty scored); Barry (penalty missed)

23 August 2016 Second round	Queens Park Rangers	2–1	Rochdale (League One)	Shepherd's Bush
19:45 BST	Sandro (yellow card) 29' (goal) 41', 74'	Report	Lund 5' (yellow card) 70'; Rafferty (yellow card) 66'	Stadium: Loftus Road; Attendance: 3,928; Referee: Dean Whitestone

21 September 2016 Third round	Queens Park Rangers	1–2	Sunderland (Premier League)	Shepherd's Bush
19:45 BST	Sandro 60'	Report	McNair 70', 80'	Stadium: Loftus Road; Attendance: 14,301; Referee: Peter Bankes

== Squad statistics ==
=== Statistics ===
As of 7 May 2017

No.	Pos	Nat	Player	Total		Sky Bet Championship		Carabao Cup		Emirates FA Cup	
No.	Pos	Nat	Player	Apps	Goals	Apps	Goals	Apps	Goals	Apps	Goals
1	GK	(England) ENG	Alex Smithies	46	0	46	0	0	0	0	0
2	MF	(England) ENG	Luke Freeman	16	2	12+4	2	0	0	0	0
3	DF	(England) ENG	Jake Bidwell	38	1	36	0	1	0	1	1
4	DF	(England) ENG	Grant Hall	36	0	34	0	1	0	1	0
5	DF	(England) ENG	Nedum Onuoha	47	3	43+1	3	2	0	1	0
6	DF	(Wales) WAL	Joel Lynch	33	3	28+2	3	2	0	1	0
7	MF	(Poland) POL	Ariel Borysiuk †	11	0	8+2	0	1	0	0	0
8	MF	(England) ENG	Jordan Cousins	20	0	17+1	0	1	0	0+1	0
9	FW	(Northern Ireland) NIR	Conor Washington	43	8	26+14	7	3	1	0	0
10	MF	(Netherlands) NED	Tjaronn Chery †	25	4	22	4	0+3	0	0	0
10	MF	(England) ENG	Sean Goss	6	0	3+3	0	0	0	0	0
11	MF	(England) ENG	Ben Gladwin †	8	0	3+4	0	0	0	1	0
12	MF	(Scotland) SCO	Jamie Mackie	19	1	11+7	1	0	0	1	0
13	GK	(England) ENG	Matt Ingram	4	0	0	0	3	0	1	0
14	FW	(England) ENG	Jay Emmanuel-Thomas †	0	0	0	0	0	0	0	0
15	MF	(Poland) POL	Paweł Wszołek	31	3	23+6	3	1	0	1	0
16	MF	(Wales) WAL	Michael Doughty	4	0	2+2	0	0	0	0	0
17	FW	(Germany) GER	Sebastian Polter †	23	4	12+8	4	0+3	0	0	0
17	FW	(England) ENG	Matt Smith	16	4	13+3	4	0	0	0	0
18	DF	(England) ENG	Jack Robinson	7	0	7	0	0	0	0	0
19	MF	(Netherlands) NED	Abdenasser El Khayati	9	0	1+5	0	3	0	0	0
20	MF	(England) ENG	Karl Henry	16	0	13+1	0	1	0	1	0
21	MF	(Australia) AUS	Massimo Luongo	37	1	35	1	0+2	0	0	0
22	DF	(England) ENG	Steven Caulker	14	2	12+1	2	1	0	0	0
23	MF	(Democratic Republic of the Congo) COD	Yeni Ngbakoto	28	4	13+13	3	1	1	0+1	0
24	DF	(England) ENG	James Perch	33	0	27+3	0	2	0	1	0
25	MF	(Canada) CAN	Michael Petrasso	2	0	1+1	0	0	0	0	0
26	GK	(England) ENG	Joe Lumley†	0	0	0	0	0	0	0	0
27	FW	(Republic of Ireland) IRL	Olamide Shodipo †	14	0	5+6	0	2	0	0+1	0
28	MF	(Hungary) HUN	Dániel Tőzsér †	0	0	0	0	0	0	0	0
28	MF	(Democratic Republic of the Congo) COD	Kazenga LuaLua	11	1	2+9	1	0	0	0	0
29	DF	(England) ENG	Darnell Furlong	15	0	13+1	0	1	0	0	0
30	MF	(Brazil) BRA	Sandro †	8	3	3+3	0	2	3	0	0
30	MF	(England) ENG	Josh Bowler	1	0	0+1	0	0	0	0	0
32	DF	(England) ENG	Cole Kpekawa †	1	0	0	0	0+1	0	0	0
33	MF	(France) FRA	Axel Prohouly †	0	0	0	0	0	0	0	0
34	DF	(England) ENG	Osman Kakay †	3	0	0+1	0	2	0	0	0
35	FW	(Republic of Ireland) IRL	Reece Grego-Cox	1	0	0+1	0	0	0	0	0
36	MF	(Montserrat) MSR	Brandon Comley †	1	0	0+1	0	0	0	0	0
37	MF	(England) ENG	Chris Paul	0	0	0	0	0	0	0	0
38	DF	(Finland) FIN	Niko Hämäläinen	3	0	1+1	0	1	0	0	0
39	MF	(England) ENG	Eberechi Eze	1	0	0	0	0	0	1	0
40	FW	(Guinea) GUI	Idrissa Sylla	33	10	14+18	10	1	0	0	0
41	MF	(Republic of Ireland) IRL	Ryan Manning	18	1	17+1	1	0	0	0	0
49	MF	(England) ENG	Ravel Morrison	5	0	1+4	0	0	0	0	0

† denotes players that left the club during the season.

=== Goals ===
As of 7 May 2017

Rank	Player	Position	Championship	League Cup	FA Cup	Total
1	(Guinea) Idrissa Sylla	FW	10	0	0	10
2	(Northern Ireland) Conor Washington	FW	7	1	0	8
3	(Democratic Republic of the Congo) Yeni Ngbakoto	MF	3	1	0	4
3	(England) Matt Smith	FW	4	0	0	4
3	(Netherlands) Tjaronn Chery	MF	4	0	0	4
3	(Germany) Sebastian Polter	FW	4	0	0	4
7	(Poland) Paweł Wszołek	MF	3	0	0	3
7	(England) Nedum Onuoha	DF	3	0	0	3
7	(Brazil) Sandro	MF	0	3	0	3
10	(England) Luke Freeman	MF	2	0	0	2
10	(England) Steven Caulker	DF	2	0	0	2
12	(Wales) Joel Lynch	DF	3	0	0	3
12	(Scotland) Jamie Mackie	FW	1	0	0	1
12	(Republic of Ireland) Ryan Manning	MF	1	0	0	1
12	(Democratic Republic of the Congo) Kazenga LuaLua	MF	1	0	0	1
12	(Australia) Massimo Luongo	MF	1	0	0	1
12	(England) Jake Bidwell	DF	0	0	1	1
Total			52	5	1	58

=== Clean sheets ===
As of 7 May 2017

Rank	Player	Position	Championship	League Cup	FA Cup	Total
1	(England) Alex Smithies	GK	7	0	0	7
Total			7	0	0	7

=== Discipline ===
As of 2 January 2017

N	P	Nat.	Name	Championship			League Cup			FA Cup			Total			Notes
N	P	Nat.	Name	Yellow card	Second yellow card	Red card	Yellow card	Second yellow card	Red card	Yellow card	Second yellow card	Red card	Yellow card	Second yellow card	Red card	Notes
3	DF	(England)	Jake Bidwell	4									4			
4	DF	(England)	Grant Hall	3	1								3	1		
5	DF	(England)	Nedum Onuoha	3		1							3		1	
6	DF	(Wales)	Joel Lynch	2									2			
7	MF	(Poland)	Ariel Borysiuk	1									1			
8	MF	(England)	Jordan Cousins	1									1			
9	FW	(Northern Ireland)	Conor Washington	1									1			
10	MF	(Netherlands)	Tjaronn Chery	3									3			
11	MF	(England)	Ben Gladwin	1									1			
17	FW	(Germany)	Sebastian Polter	2			1						3			
18	DF	(England)	Jack Robinson	1									1			
20	MF	(England)	Karl Henry	5	1		1						6	1		
21	MF	(Australia)	Massimo Luongo	3									3			
22	DF	(England)	Steven Caulker	1									1			
23	MF	(Democratic Republic of the Congo)	Yeni Ngbakoto	1									1			
24	DF	(England)	James Perch	4	1		1						5	1		
27	FW	(Republic of Ireland)	Olamide Shodipo	2			1						3			
30	MF	(Brazil)	Sandro				1						1			
38	DF	(Finland)	Niko Hämäläinen	1									1			
40	FW	(Guinea)	Idrissa Sylla	3									3			
41	MF	(Republic of Ireland)	Ryan Manning	1									1			

Last updated: 2 January 2017
Source: Matches
Ordered by (red card) , (second yellow card) and (yellow card)
(yellow card) = Number of bookings; (second yellow card) = Number of sending offs after a second yellow card; (red card) = Number of sending offs by a direct red card.
