= Ian Smith (footballer, born 1952) =

Scottish footballer

Personal information
- Full name: Ian Lennox Taylor Smith
- Date of birth: 2 April 1952 (age 74)
- Place of birth: Edinburgh, Scotland
- Height: 6 ft 2 in (1.88 m)
- Position: Forward

Senior career*
Years	Team	Apps	(Gls)
1973–1974^{[A]}	Queen's Park	19	(7)
1975	Birmingham City	2	(0)
1977	Heart of Midlothian	7	(2)
–	Kidderminster Harriers		
1981	Bromsgrove Rovers		
1982–1983	Queen of the South	3	(1)
1983–1984	Bromsgrove Rovers		
- * Club domestic league appearances and goals

Ian Lennox Taylor Smith (born 2 April 1952), sometimes listed as Ian Taylor-Smith, is a Scottish former footballer who played in the Scottish Football League for Queens Park, Heart of Midlothian and Queen of the South, and in the English Football League for Birmingham City. He played as a forward.

Smith was born in Edinburgh. He studied medicine, and eventually qualified as a doctor, combining this with playing football on an amateur or semi-professional basis. He spent time with several clubs in both Scotland and England, playing league football only where it did not interfere with his medical career. While with Birmingham City, he scored regularly for the reserve team and was highly rated, but his work at the Queen Elizabeth Medical Centre restricted him to only two first-team appearances.

His father, Jimmy, played professionally for Clyde and St Mirren in the 1930s, and his son, Matt, turned professional with Oldham Athletic in 2011.

== Notes ==
A. Because Smith's football career was intermittent, the years in the infobox represent years or seasons when he was known to have played for or to have been registered with each team: Queen's Park, Birmingham City, Heart of Midlothian, Bromsgrove Rovers, and Queen of the South.
