= Massimo Luongo =

Australian footballer (born 1992)

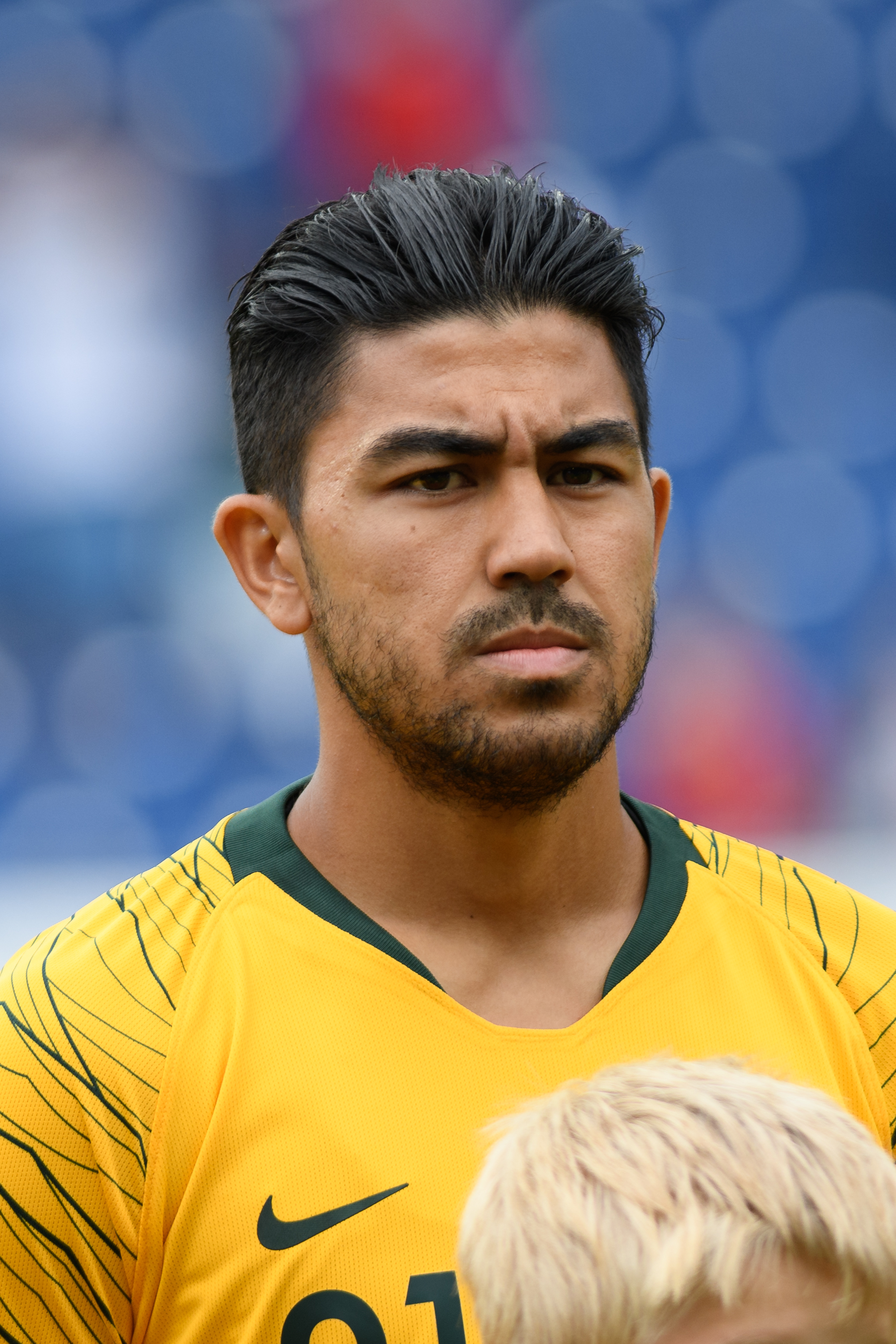
- Luongo with Australia in 2018

Personal information
- Full name: Massimo Corey Luongo
- Date of birth: 25 September 1992 (age 34)
- Place of birth: Sydney, New South Wales, Australia
- Height: 1.76 m (5 ft 9 in)
- Position: Defensive midfielder

Team information
- Current team: Millwall
- Number: 21

Youth career
- 2004–2010: APIA Leichhardt Tigers
- 2011: Tottenham Hotspur

Senior career*
Years	Team	Apps	(Gls)
2011–2013	Tottenham Hotspur	0	(0)
2012	→ Ipswich Town (loan)	9	(0)
2013	→ Swindon Town (loan)	7	(1)
2013	→ Swindon Town (loan)	5	(2)
2013–2015	Swindon Town	73	(10)
2015–2019	Queens Park Rangers	145	(10)
2019–2022	Sheffield Wednesday	64	(4)
2022–2023	Middlesbrough	0	(0)
2023–2025	Ipswich Town	69	(5)
2025–	Millwall	9	(0)

International career
2014–2024	Australia	45	(6)
Medal record
Representing Australia
AFC Asian Cup
Winner	2015 Australia
- * Club domestic league appearances and goals as of 15 May 2026 (UTC)

Massimo Corey Luongo (/ˈmæsɪmoʊ luˈɒŋɡoʊ/ MASS-ih-moh loo-ONG-goh; Italian: [ˈmassimo ˈlwoŋɡo]; born 25 September 1992) is an Australian professional soccer player who plays as a defensive midfielder for EFL Championship club Millwall.

Born in Sydney, Luongo played youth football for APIA Leichhardt Tigers before moving to England to play for Tottenham Hotspur, where he started his professional career. Following a loan spell at Ipswich Town, he played on loan at Swindon Town, a move which was eventually made permanent. After four years at Queens Park Rangers, he joined Sheffield Wednesday in 2019.

Luongo played for the Australia national team from 2014 to 2024, making 45 appearances in total before announcing his retirement from international football in December 2023, before returning briefly in late 2024. He was a member of the squad at the 2014 FIFA World Cup and played a central role in Australia winning the 2015 AFC Asian Cup, where he scored in the final and was named player of the tournament. He also went to the 2018 FIFA World Cup and 2019 AFC Asian Cup.

== Early life and education ==
Luongo was born on 25 September 1992 in Sydney, Australia. His father Mario is of Italian heritage and mother Ira is of Indonesian descent. He attended Waverley College. He is the youngest of three children; he has a sister Angela and a brother Tiziano. In addition to holding an Australian passport, Luongo also has an Italian passport.

According to Luongo, his maternal great-grandfather was Sultan Ambela Abu'l-Khair Sirajuddin of Bima Sultanate based in Sumbawa.

== Club career ==
=== Tottenham Hotspur ===
Luongo signed for Tottenham Hotspur in January 2011 after impressing on trial, and went on to make nine appearances for the under-18 team during the 2010–11 Premier Academy League season, scoring three goals. He made his only appearance for the first team on 20 September 2011 in a 7–6 penalty shootout loss to fellow Premier League club Stoke City in the third round of the League Cup, replacing Sandro after 70 minutes. Luongo had his penalty attempt saved by Thomas Sørensen, resulting in the defeat.

On 6 February 2012, he was called up to a league match for the first time, remaining an unused substitute as Tottenham earned a goalless draw away to Liverpool. Thirteen days later he was included in the squad for the last time, again unused in a goalless FA Cup fifth round match away to League One team Stevenage.

==== Ipswich Town (loan) ====
On 23 July 2012, Luongo joined Championship side Ipswich Town on a season-long loan for the 2012–13 season. He made his debut on 14 August in the first round of the League Cup, playing the entirety of a 3–1 win over League Two club Bristol Rovers at Portman Road. Four days later he played his first professional league game, starting in a 1–1 home draw against Blackburn Rovers and making way for Andy Drury after 70 minutes. On 28 August, in the second round of the League Cup against Carlisle United at Brunton Park, he scored from outside the penalty area to put Ipswich ahead with his first professional goal, but Carlisle scored a late equaliser and won 2–1 after extra time.

The loan was terminated on 9 November after new Ipswich manager Mick McCarthy said that he wanted a 'different type of player'.

=== Swindon Town ===
On 28 March 2013, Luongo signed for Swindon Town on loan along with fellow Spurs trainees Nathan Byrne and Dean Parrett. The very next day he went straight into the squad to face Oldham Athletic and play the full 90 minutes in a 1–1 draw at the County Ground. On 16 April, Luongo scored his first goal for Swindon in a 4–1 win over Crewe Alexandra, heading in Gary Roberts' cross. He opened the scoring on 4 May in the 70th minute of the first leg of the play-off semi-final against Brentford, but in added time conceded a penalty by fouling Harry Forrester; Kevin O'Connor converted it for a 1–1 draw. Swindon eventually lost the tie in a penalty shootout.

Luongo signed a season-long loan deal with Swindon Town on 2 July 2013 and was handed the number 4 shirt.

At the end of August 2013, Swindon signed Luongo on a permanent three-year contract, having agreed a fee of £400,000 with Spurs. He scored six goals in 44 league appearances that season, including a first professional brace in a 5–2 home win over Port Vale on 2 November. In the following campaign, he got just as many goals but in 34 matches, as Swindon lost the play-off final to Preston North End at Wembley Stadium.

=== Queens Park Rangers ===
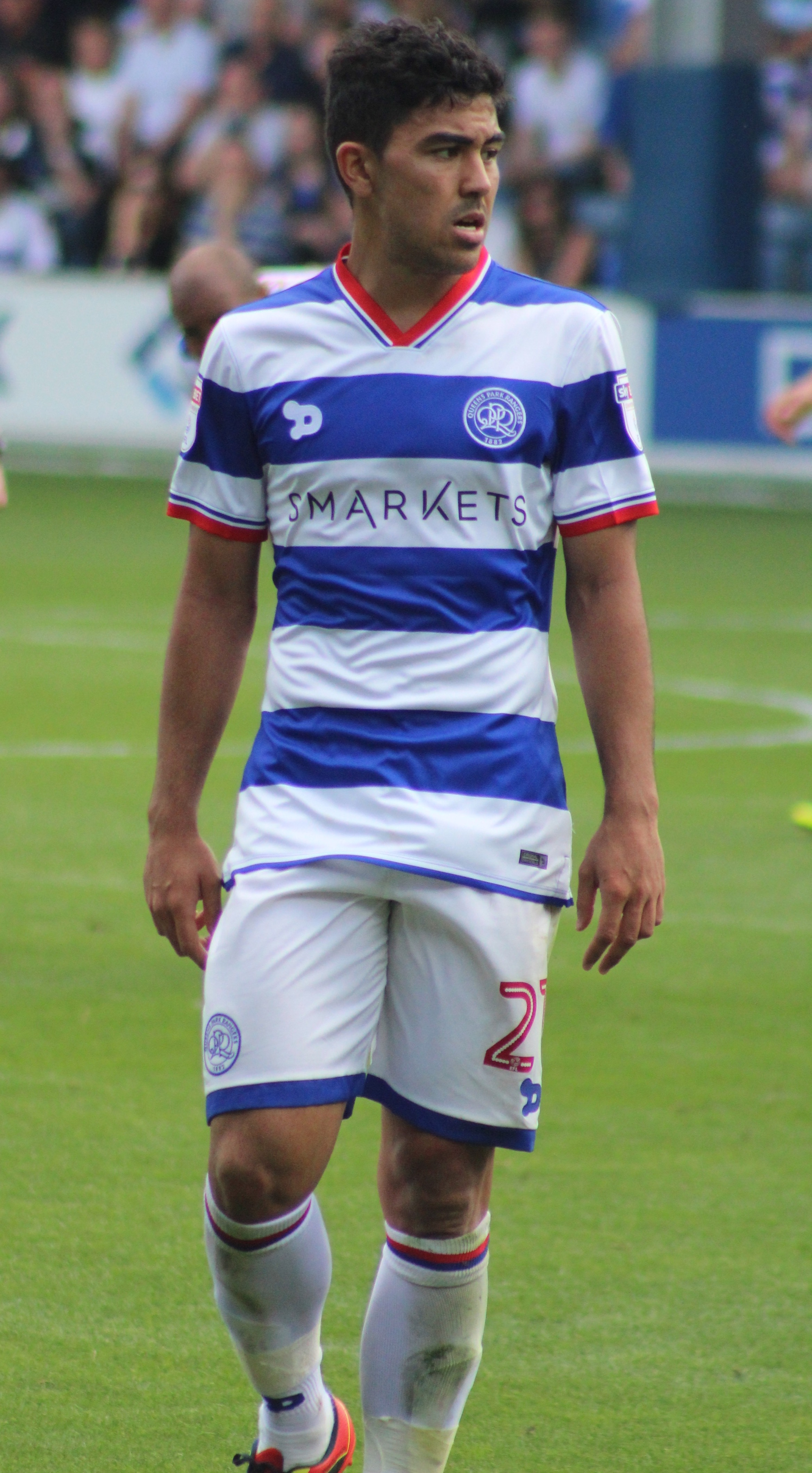
Luongo playing for Queens Park Rangers in 2016

On 28 May 2015, Luongo joined Queens Park Rangers, along with Swindon Town teammate Ben Gladwin, both signing a three-year deal. QPR head coach Chris Ramsey was Luongo's youth coach at Tottenham. He made his debut in the first game of the Championship season on 8 August, playing the full 90 minutes of a 2–0 defeat at Charlton Athletic. Luongo played 30 league games in his first season – 32 overall – but did not score. His performances earned him a place on the FIFA Ballon d'Or longlist for the 2015 campaign.

He scored his first goal for QPR in a 5–1 win over Rotherham United on 18 March 2017. Following Nedum Onuoha's ruptured hamstring injury that November, Luongo was handed the responsibility of captaincy.

=== Sheffield Wednesday ===
On 8 August 2019, Luongo joined Sheffield Wednesday for an undisclosed fee. He made his debut the following weekend, coming off the bench against Barnsley. He scored his first goal for the club against Wigan Athletic, which was also his first start for the club. He was sent off in a game against Blackburn Rovers, but the red card was later rescinded.

In his second season at the club, he was injured several times, the first being in a game against Luton Town, returning on 7 December 2020. He was ruled out again for another five to six weeks on 24 February 2021.

After another injury layoff, he returned to the squad at the start of 2022 with some impressive performances, winning the clubs January Player-of-the-Month competition, as well as appearing in two of EFL's Team of the Week after his performances against Ipswich Town and Plymouth Argyle. The club announced he was offered a new contract following the end of the 2021-22 season. On 22 June 2022, it was confirmed that he had rejected his new contract and would leave the club.

=== Middlesbrough ===
On 8 September 2022, Luongo joined Middlesbrough on a short-term deal until January 2023. His contract was cancelled by mutual consent on 5 January, having not made an appearance.

=== Ipswich Town ===
On the same day as being released from Middlesbrough, Luongo signed a short-term deal at Ipswich of EFL League One, where he had been loaned to over a decade earlier. He made his first appearance on 28 January 2023 in the fourth round of the FA Cup, as a 78th-minute substitute for Sam Morsy in a goalless home draw with Championship leaders Burnley; on 18 March, as a starter, he scored the first goal of his spell to conclude a 2–0 win over Shrewsbury Town at Portman Road.

On 9 June 2025, Luongo was released by Ipswich at the expiration of his contract following the end of the 2024–25 season.

=== Millwall ===
On 25 June 2025, Luongo joined Championship side Millwall on a free transfer, signing a one-year contract.

He made his debut for the club, coming on as a late substitute, in a 1–0 win over Norwich City at Carrow Road in the opening game of the season. In October 2025, he suffered a ruptured anterior cruciate ligament that ruled him out for the remainder of the season.

He was released upon the expiry of his contract at the end of the 2025–26 season. However on 4 August 2026, he signed a new one-year contract at the club.

== International career ==
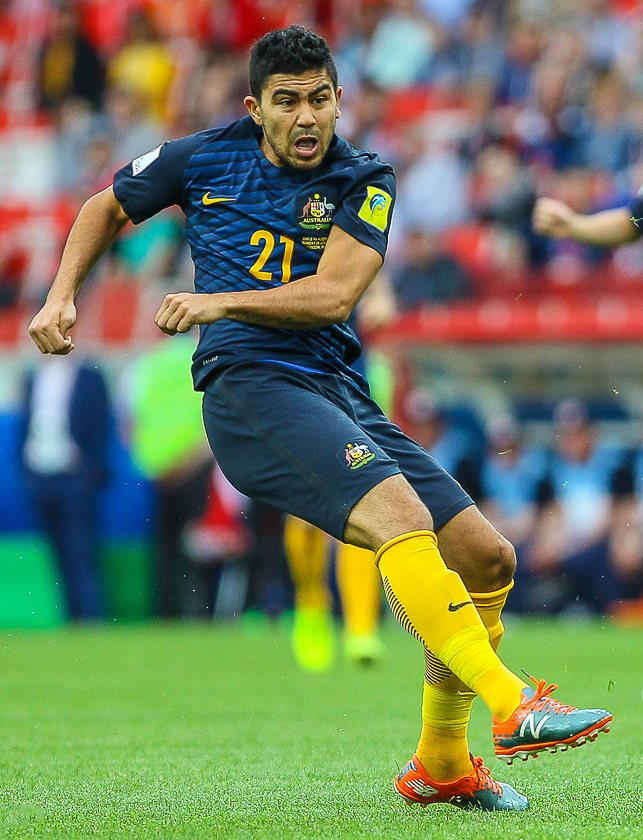
Luongo playing for Australia at the 2017 FIFA Confederations Cup.

Luongo represented the Australia under-20 team twice but was not selected for the 2011 FIFA U-20 World Cup.

He made his debut for the Socceroos on 6 March 2014 as a second-half substitute for captain Mile Jedinak in the 3–4 loss to Ecuador at The New Den in London. He was selected for the 23-man Australia squad for the 2014 FIFA World Cup in Brazil by manager Ange Postecoglou, but did not feature in any of their three matches as they were eliminated in the group stage.

Luongo was also selected in the 23-man squad for the Asia Cup to be played on home soil in Australia. Swindon teammate Yaser Kasim was also called up for Iraq, meaning that the club would have to compete in their regular League One season without the two central midfielders for a month. He went on to score in Australia's 4–1 win over Kuwait in the opening game of the tournament, in addition to providing the assist that led to Tim Cahill scoring Australia's first goal of the match. At the end of the game, he was named as man of the match. Luongo also started in Australia's second group game against Oman, providing the assist for Robbie Kruse to score Australia's second goal in an eventual 4–0 win. He played in the 2015 AFC Asian Cup Final against South Korea, scoring the first goal from outside the box in a 2–1 win. He was named as Most Valuable Player of the tournament after scoring two goals and assisting four throughout the tournament.

Luongo was named in Australia's 23-man squad for the 2018 FIFA World Cup in Russia by manager Bert van Marwijk after having the most prolific season of his career at QPR. He did not play as the team were eliminated from the group stage, and told London's Metro newspaper that he was frustrated to not feature. He was chosen for the 2019 AFC Asian Cup in the United Arab Emirates.

In December 2023, Luongo announced his retirement from international football to focus on his domestic football, to focus on helping his club Ipswich Town to be promoted to the Premier League. He had played for the Socceroos 45 times.

In October 2024, Luongo came out of international retirement after being named in Tony Popovic's inaugural Australia squad for World Cup qualifiers against China and Japan.

== Career statistics ==
=== Club ===
As of end of 2025–26 season

Appearances and goals by club, season and competition
Club	Season	League			FA Cup		League Cup		Other		Total	
Club	Season	Division	Apps	Goals	Apps	Goals	Apps	Goals	Apps	Goals	Apps	Goals
Tottenham Hotspur	2011–12	Premier League	0	0	0	0	1	0	0	0	1	0
Tottenham Hotspur	2012–13	Premier League	0	0	0	0	0	0	0	0	0	0
Tottenham Hotspur	2013–14	Premier League	0	0	0	0	0	0	0	0	0	0
Tottenham Hotspur	Total		0	0	0	0	1	0	0	0	1	0
Ipswich Town (loan)	2012–13	Championship	9	0	—		2	1	—		11	1
Swindon Town (loan)	2012–13	League One	7	1	—		—		2 (Note: Appearance(s) in League One play-offs)	0	9	1
Swindon Town (loan)	2013–14	League One	5	2	—		2	0	—		7	2
Swindon Town	2013–14	League One	39	4	1	0	1	0	5 (Note: Appearance(s) in Football League Trophy)	0	46	4
Swindon Town	2014–15	League One	34	6	1	0	2	0	3	0	40	6
Swindon Town	Total		73	10	2	0	3	0	8	0	86	10
Queens Park Rangers	2015–16	Championship	30	0	1	0	1	0	—		32	0
Queens Park Rangers	2016–17	Championship	35	1	1	0	2	0	—		38	1
Queens Park Rangers	2017–18	Championship	39	6	0	0	0	0	—		39	6
Queens Park Rangers	2018–19	Championship	41	3	2	0	0	0	—		43	3
Queens Park Rangers	Total		145	10	4	0	3	0	—		152	10
Sheffield Wednesday	2019–20	Championship	27	3	1	0	2	0	—		30	3
Sheffield Wednesday	2020–21	Championship	12	0	0	0	1	0	—		13	0
Sheffield Wednesday	2021–22	League One	25	1	1	0	1	0	3 (Note: One appearance in Football League Trophy; Two appearances in League One play-offs)	0	30	1
Sheffield Wednesday	Total		64	4	2	0	4	0	3	0	73	4
Middlesbrough	2022–23	Championship	0	0	—		0	0	—		0	0
Ipswich Town	2022–23	League One	15	2	1	0	—		—		16	2
Ipswich Town	2023–24	Championship	43	3	0	0	1	0	—		44	3
Ipswich Town	2024–25	Premier League	11	0	3	0	1	0	—		15	0
Ipswich Town	Total		69	5	4	0	2	0	—		75	5
Millwall	2025–26	Championship	9	0	0	0	2	1	—		11	1
Millwall	2026–27	Championship	0	0	0	0	0	0	—		0	0
Millwall	Total		9	0	0	0	2	1	—		11	1
Career total			381	32	12	0	19	2	11	0	423	34

=== International ===
Appearances and goals by national team and year
National team	Year	Apps	Goals
Australia	2014	4	0
Australia	2015	12	2
Australia	2016	7	3
Australia	2017	8	0
Australia	2018	7	1
Australia	2019	4	0
Australia	2023	2	0
Total		44	6

Scores and results list Australia's goal tally first, score column indicates score after each Luongo goal.

List of international goals scored by Massimo Luongo
No.	Date	Venue	Opponent	Score	Result	Competition	Ref.
1	9 January 2015	Melbourne Rectangular Stadium, Melbourne, Australia	Kuwait	2–1	4–1	2015 AFC Asian Cup	
2	31 January 2015	Stadium Australia, Sydney, Australia	South Korea	1–0	2–1 (a.e.t.)	2015 AFC Asian Cup	
3	24 March 2016	Adelaide Oval, Adelaide, Australia	Tajikistan	1–0	7–0	2018 FIFA World Cup qualification	
4	29 March 2016	Sydney Football Stadium, Sydney, Australia	Jordan	5–0	5–1	2018 FIFA World Cup qualification	
5	1 September 2016	Perth Oval, Perth, Australia	Iraq	1–0	2–0	2018 FIFA World Cup qualification	
6	17 November 2018	Lang Park, Brisbane, Australia	South Korea	1–1	1–1	Friendly	

== Honours ==
Ipswich Town

- EFL League One runner-up: 2022–23
- EFL Championship runner-up: 2023–24

Australia

- AFC Asian Cup: 2015

Individual

- PFA Team of the Year: 2014–15 League One
- AFC Asian Cup Most Valuable Player: 2015
- AFC Asian Cup Team of the Tournament: 2015
- AFC Asian International Player of the Year third-place: 2015
- Queens Park Rangers Player of the Season: 2017–18
