= Matt Smith (footballer, born 1989) =

English footballer

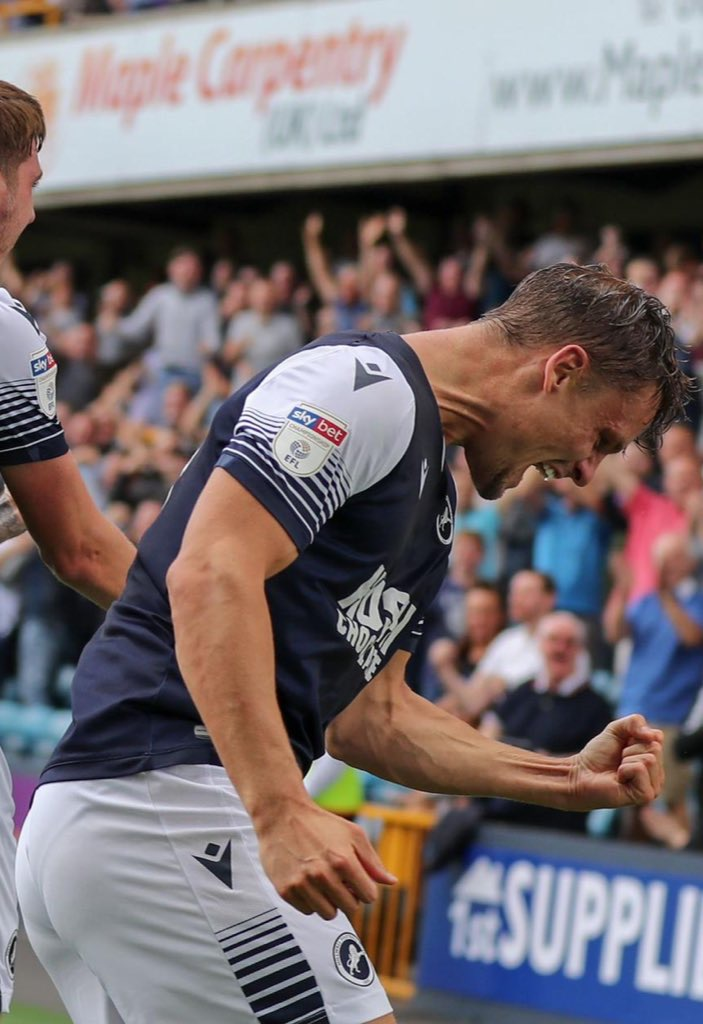
- Smith with Millwall in 2019

Personal information
- Full name: Mathieu James Patrick Smith
- Date of birth: 7 June 1989 (age 37)
- Place of birth: Birmingham, England
- Height: 1.98 m (6 ft 6 in)
- Position: Striker

Youth career
- 2005–2006: Evesham United
- 2006–2007: Cheltenham Town

Senior career*
Years	Team	Apps	(Gls)
2008–2009	New Mills	23	(13)
2010	Redditch United	6	(5)
2010	→ Littleton (loan)	3	(9)
2010	Droylsden	4	(1)
2010–2011	Redditch United	8	(3)
2011	Solihull Moors	15	(12)
2011–2013	Oldham Athletic	62	(9)
2012	→ Macclesfield Town (loan)	8	(1)
2013–2014	Leeds United	42	(12)
2014–2017	Fulham	51	(9)
2014–2015	→ Bristol City (loan)	14	(7)
2017–2019	Queens Park Rangers	92	(21)
2019–2022	Millwall	91	(17)
2022–2024	Salford City	104	(41)
Total		523	(160)
- * Club domestic league appearances and goals as of 11:39, 20 August 2024 (UTC)

Mathieu James Patrick Smith (born 7 June 1989) is an English former professional footballer who played as a striker.

Beginning his career in the non-league of English football, he had short spells with New Mills, Redditch United, Littleton, Droylsden, and Solihull Moors. His 21 goals in the 2010–11 Conference North season caught the attention of League One team Oldham Athletic, where he spent two years, including a short loan spell at Macclesfield Town, before signing for Championship club Leeds United in 2013.

After one year at Leeds, he signed for Fulham, where he found first team opportunities limited, and was soon loaned out to Bristol City. After three seasons with Fulham, he moved to Queens Park Rangers, where he was the club's top goalscorer in the 2017–18 season. He signed for Millwall in 2019, and was the top goalscorer in his first season. He dropped down two divisions to sign for Salford in January 2022, and in his first full season he was the club's top goalscorer as Salford reached the League Two playoffs for the first time. In his final season, he scored a career-high 25 goals and was named Salford's player of the season, as well as being named in the League Two team of the season.

== Career ==
=== Early years ===
After joining Evesham United in 2005, Smith spent a year as a trainee at Cheltenham Town, before being released at the age of 18. He then moved into non-league football with New Mills, whilst studying at the University of Manchester. He made his debut for New Mills in the North West Counties Premier League as a substitute against Silsden in October 2008, scoring in a 2–0 win. He went on to play a crucial role in the club's 21 game winning run, scoring 13 goals over the season including a hat trick against Alsager Town in April 2009. As he was due to spend a year studying in America, he left the Millers that summer.

Upon his return to England, ahead of the 2010–11 season, Smith signed for Redditch United in the Conference North. He initially went on a short-term loan with Midland Combination Division One side Littleton, scoring nine goals in three games. Upon returning to Redditch United, Smith scored five goals in six games, including a hat-trick against Hyde United in The Reds first win of the season, and subsequently moved to Droylsden in September 2010, largely due to the club's close proximity to Manchester University where he was completing his studies. Smith rejoined Redditch in December, before making a final move to Solihull Moors in February 2011. After scoring the equaliser in a 1–1 draw with Stalybridge Celtic on his debut, he scored 12 goals in 15 appearances. He finished the season having scored 21 goals in the Conference North.

=== Oldham Athletic ===
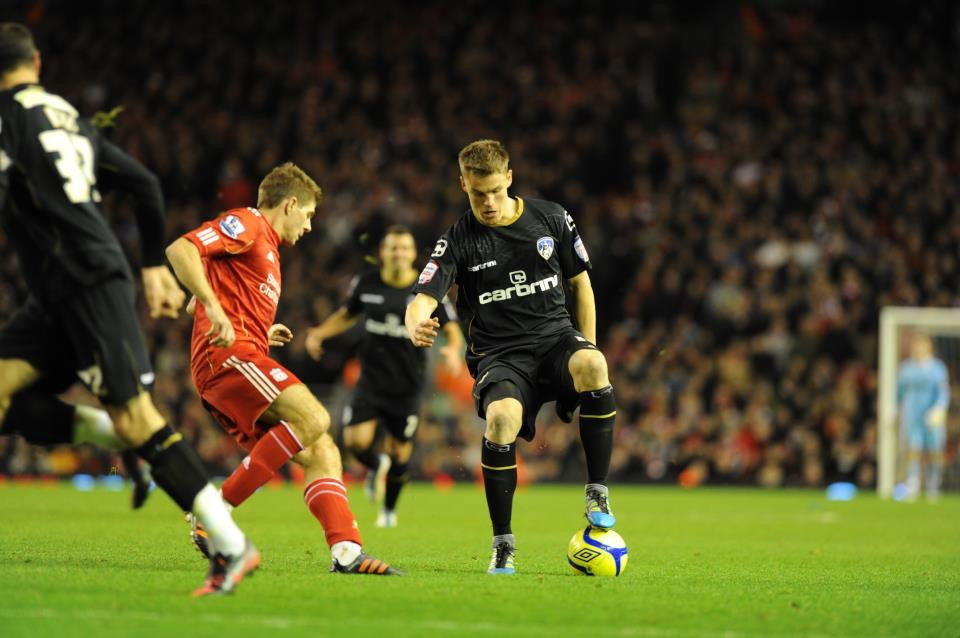
Smith playing for Oldham at Anfield in the FA Cup in 2013

On 23 May 2011, Smith joined League One side Oldham Athletic, signing a two-year contract. He made his professional debut on the opening day of the 2011–12 season against Sheffield United and scored his first professional goal 10 days later on 16 August, the winner in a 2–1 win against Scunthorpe. Smith was limited to only 4 starts in 35 appearances for the Latics in his first season at the club, and so on 15 March 2012, manager Paul Dickov allowed Smith to go on loan to League Two side Macclesfield Town for the remaining six weeks of the season, where he made eight appearances and scored one goal.

On 27 January 2013, in Smith's second season at the club, he scored two goals in a 3–2 win over Liverpool in the fourth round of the FA Cup. In the fifth round on 16 February, Smith then scored a 95th-minute equaliser against Everton to achieve a 2–2 draw. Oldham's FA Cup campaign continued with a fifth-round replay at Goodison Park on 26 February, in which they lost 3–1 with Smith again scoring for Oldham, meaning he finished Oldham's FA Cup campaign with four goals from four appearances and all goals coming against Premier League opposition. For his performance in the fifth round, Smith was voted as the Player of the Round. Smith scored three goals in his last three appearances of the season, against Bury, Yeovil and Crawley, which all culminated in wins and ultimately ensured Oldham's survival in League One. As a result, he won League One Player of the Month for April 2013. Smith finished the 2012–13 season with 11 goals in all competitions. On 23 May, with reported interest from a host of Championship clubs, Smith rejected an improved contract offer from Oldham Athletic.

=== Leeds United ===
On 10 June 2013, Smith signed a two-year contract with Championship club Leeds United after turning down a new contract with Oldham Athletic. He made his Leeds United debut as a substitute in the opening game of the season against Brighton & Hove Albion on 3 August, assisting Luke Murphy's 94th-minute winner in Leeds' 2–1 win. Smith scored his first goal for Leeds soon after on 27 August against Doncaster Rovers in their 3–1 League Cup second round win. He followed this up with goals in the league against Burnley, Birmingham City, Huddersfield Town, Watford, Doncaster and Blackburn Rovers. However, on 11 January 2014 Smith was sent off for violent conduct just two minutes after coming on as substitute in a 6–0 defeat against Sheffield Wednesday, for which he received a three-game ban. He finished the 2013–14 season with 13 goals in all competitions.

On 11 July, whilst on pre-season camp in Italy, he scored six goals in a friendly against Italian side FC Gherdeina. On 18 August, at the start of the 2014–15 season and following a successful debut year at the club, Smith signed a new three-year contract. One week later, he scored his first goal of the season against Bradford City in the League Cup, opening the scoring in a 2–1 defeat. The following week, on the final day of the transfer window, Smith was sold to Fulham.

=== Fulham ===
On 1 September 2014, Fulham signed Smith for an undisclosed fee on a three-year contract. Smith was given a straight red card 18 minutes into his Fulham debut in a 3–0 loss against Reading. Following the sacking of Felix Magath a week later, and the subsequent appointment of Kit Symons as manager soon after, Smith was limited to a further two substitute appearances in almost three months at Craven Cottage.

==== Bristol City (loan) ====
Smith moved on loan to League One side Bristol City on 25 November for two months. This was then later extended by a further month until 1 March. After joining Bristol City on loan, Smith registered his first goal for the club in his fifth appearance, scoring the opener in a 2–1 home victory against West Country rivals Yeovil Town on Boxing Day. This began a sequence of nine goals in five games – including four in one match, away at Gillingham in the Football League Trophy semi-final. After completing his hat-trick with a back-heel, Smith's fourth was a half-volley from the angle of the penalty area, which later won the "Goal of the Tournament". He was the first player to score four goals in a game for Bristol City since Paul Agostino against St Albans in 1996. Another goal from Smith in the second leg of the tie helped secure Bristol City a place in the Football League Trophy final at Wembley against Walsall on 22 March, however due to his loan agreement ending on 1 March, he would be ineligible to play in this fixture. Despite this, manager Steve Cotterill insisted Smith join the squad on their trip to Wembley as a guest, to which Smith said he felt "honoured" and added it was "a touch of class from the manager." Soon after, Smith took his tally to 13 goals for the Robins when he opened the scoring against Sheffield United. On the conclusion of his loan spell, Cotterill hailed Smith's impact and contribution at the club over the course of the three months as "huge".

==== Return to Fulham ====
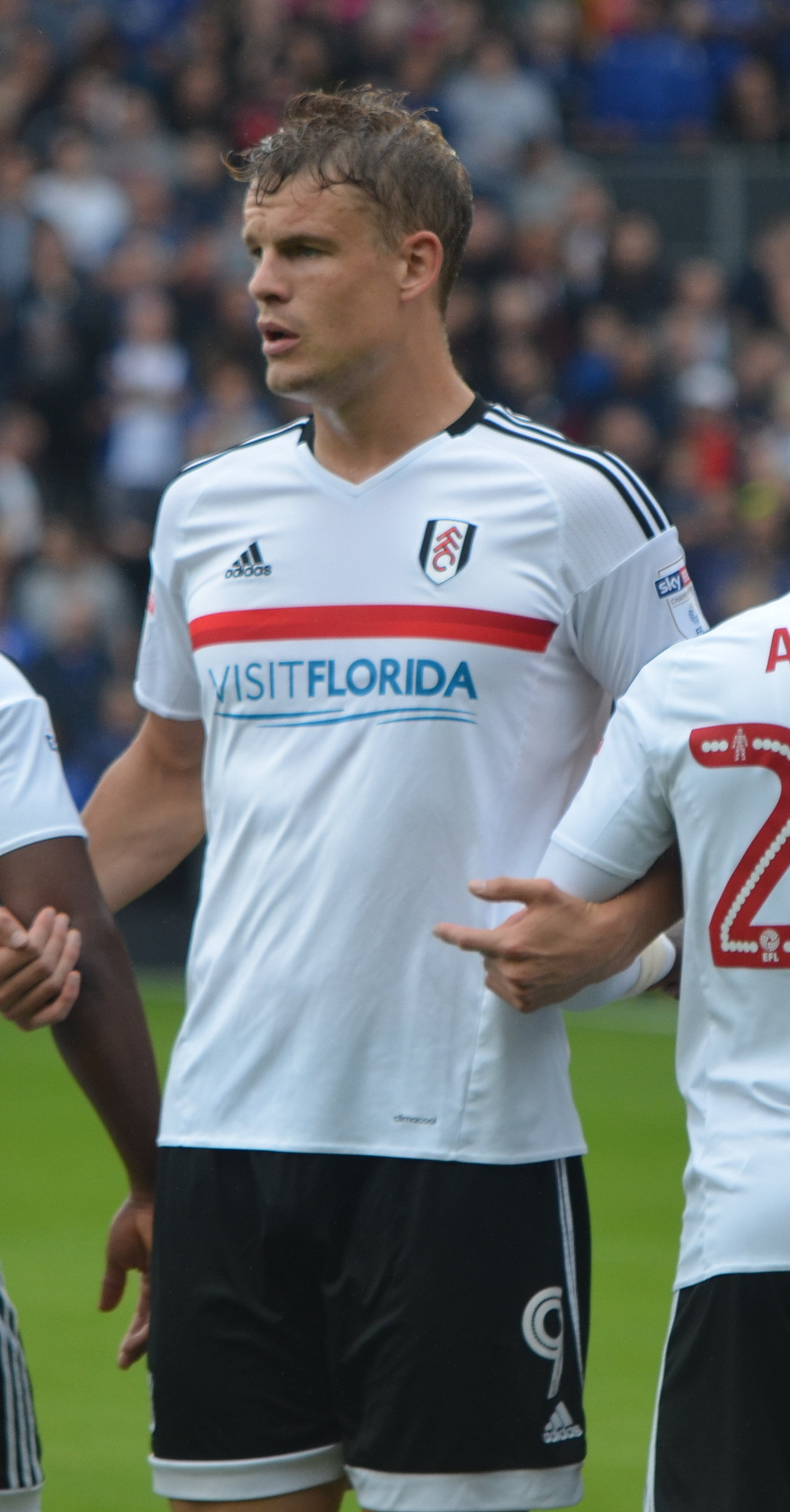
Smith playing for Fulham in 2016

Smith returned to Fulham on 1 March and scored his first goal for the club five days later in his Craven Cottage debut against Bournemouth. In the following game, Smith scored the equalizer against Sheffield Wednesday away at Hillsborough in a 1–1 draw. He then went on to score goals against Wigan, Blackpool and Norwich. Smith finished the 2014–15 season with 19 goals in all competitions.

=== Queens Park Rangers ===
On 31 January 2017, the final day of the January transfer window, QPR signed Smith for an undisclosed fee on a three-and-a-half-year contract. He contributed 20 league goals in his first full season at the club, with 11 goals and 9 assists in the Championship, which also made him the club's top goal scorer in the 2017–18 season.

=== Millwall ===
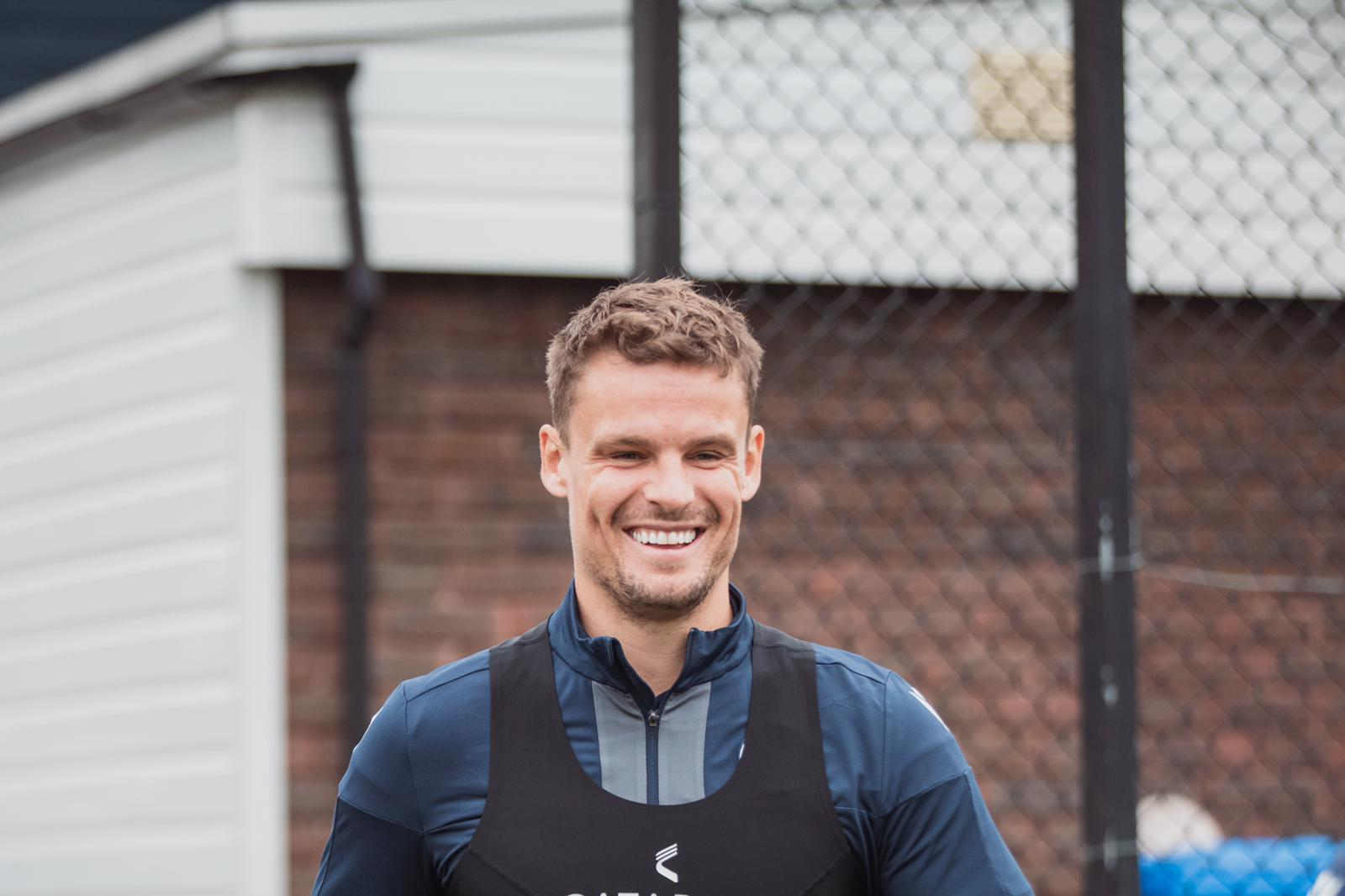
Smith at Millwall's training ground in 2020

On 1 July 2019, Smith signed for Millwall on a two-year contract for an undisclosed fee. In his first season with the club, Smith scored 14 goals in all competitions, making him the club's top goalscorer in the 2019–20 season. This included a 13-minute hat-trick in a win over Nottingham Forest on 6 March 2020, away at the City Ground.

=== Salford City ===
On 19 January 2022, Smith signed an 18-month contract with EFL League Two side Salford City. His first goal for the club proved vital, putting The Ammies ahead for a second time in a 2–1 home win against Carlisle United on 1 February.

On 20 December, Smith scored the only goal of the game to help Salford beat Port Vale and reach the quarter-finals of EFL Trophy. On 29 December, he scored a hat-trick in a 4–1 win against Grimsby Town. In the first leg of the semi-finals play-off against Stockport County at Moor Lane on 13 May 2023, Smith scored the only goal of the game from a header to give Salford the advantage going into the second leg.

On 29 August 2023, Smith scored the opening goal against former club Leeds in the second round of the EFL Cup; the game finished 1–1 before Salford won on penalties to reach the third round for the first time. On 24 October, Smith scored a hat-trick against Doncaster Rovers in a 3–0 victory. He was awarded the EFL League Two Player of the Month award for October 2023 having scored eight goals and assisted a further two. In November, Smith made the 500th professional appearance of his career.

On 20 April, Smith scored his 25th goal of the season, a 92nd minute winner against Newport County, and at the end of the season, Smith was voted as Salford Supporters' Player of the Year and the Players' Player of the Year, before announcing his departure from the club in an open letter to the club.

==== Retirement ====
On 19 August 2024, Smith announced his retirement from playing football.

== Style of play ==
Former Oldham manager Lee Johnson as well as former Oldham caretaker manager Tony Philliskirk have likened Smith to Duncan Ferguson or Andy Carroll.

== Personal life ==
Smith's father Ian is a former professional footballer having played for both Queen's Park and Heart of Midlothian in the Scottish Football League, and for Birmingham City in the English First Division. His grandfather, James, is also a former professional who played league football for St Mirren and Clyde. His half-brother Jean-Francois is a former professional basketball player, who played for Hyères-Toulon Var Basket in the French Pro A League. Smith's wife Amy is the daughter of football manager and former player Steve Bruce; in October 2024, the couple's four-month old son Madison died.

Smith completed his A-Levels in Cheltenham's Pate's Grammar School whilst a trainee at Cheltenham Town. In September 2007 he went to Manchester to study for a degree at Manchester Business School, University of Manchester, with a year spent in the United States at Arizona State University. He graduated in the summer of 2011 with a 2:1 in International Management with American Business Studies. Whilst at Manchester he was also captain of the university's men's football team, was called up to the Great Britain squad for the World University Games in China in 2011 and was nominated for the university's Sportsman of the Year Award.

Despite being English-born, Smith was also eligible for both the Scotland and France national teams as his father was born in Edinburgh and his mother Françoise was born in Paris.

== Career statistics ==
As of match played 28 April 2024

Appearances and goals by club, season and competition
Club	Season	League			FA Cup		League Cup		Other		Total	
Club	Season	Division	Apps	Goals	Apps	Goals	Apps	Goals	Apps	Goals	Apps	Goals
Redditch United	2010–11 (Note: Smith played for Redditch United in two separate spells during the 2010–11 season)	Conference North	14	8	0	0	—		—		14	8
Droylsden	2010–11	Conference North	4	1	2	0	—		1 (Note: Appearance(s) in FA Trophy)	0	7	1
Solihull Moors	2010–11	Conference North	15	12	—		—		—		15	12
Oldham Athletic	2011–12	League One	28	3	2	0	1	0	4 (Note: Appearance(s) in Football League Trophy)	0	35	3
Oldham Athletic	2012–13	League One	34	6	4	4	1	0	1	1	40	11
Oldham Athletic	Total		62	9	6	4	2	0	5	1	75	14
Macclesfield Town (loan)	2011–12	League Two	8	1	—		—		—		8	1
Leeds United	2013–14	Championship	39	12	1	0	3	1	—		43	13
Leeds United	2014–15	Championship	3	0	—		2	1	—		5	1
Leeds United	Total		42	12	1	0	5	2	—		48	14
Fulham	2014–15	Championship	15	5	—		—		—		15	5
Fulham	2015–16	Championship	20	2	0	0	1	0	—		21	2
Fulham	2016–17	Championship	16	2	0	0	1	0	—		17	2
Fulham	Total		51	9	0	0	2	0	—		53	9
Bristol City (loan)	2014–15	League One	14	7	3	1	—		3	5	20	13
Queens Park Rangers	2016–17	Championship	16	4	—		—		—		16	4
Queens Park Rangers	2017–18	Championship	41	11	1	0	2	0	—		44	11
Queens Park Rangers	2018–19	Championship	35	6	4	1	3	1	—		42	8
Queens Park Rangers	Total		92	21	5	1	5	1	—		102	23
Millwall	2019–20	Championship	41	13	2	1	0	0	—		43	14
Millwall	2020–21	Championship	29	3	2	0	3	2	—		34	5
Millwall	2021–22	Championship	21	1	1	0	3	1	—		25	2
Millwall	Total		91	17	5	1	6	3	—		102	21
Salford City	2021–22	League Two	21	7	—		—		—		21	7
Salford City	2022–23	League Two	37	10	1	0	1	0	8 (Note: Six appearances one goal in Football League Trophy; two appearances one goal in League Two play-offs)	2	47	12
Salford City	2023–24	League Two	46	24	2	0	2	1	1	0	51	25
Salford City	Total		104	41	3	0	3	1	9	2	119	44
Career total			497	138	25	7	23	7	18	8	563	160

== Honours ==
Bristol City

- Football League One: 2014–15

Individual

- Football League One Player of the Month: April 2013
- EFL League Two Player of the Month: October 2023
- EFL League Two Team of the Season: 2023–24
- Salford City Supporters' Player of the Season: 2023–24
- Salford City Players' Player of the Season: 2023–24
