= Paul Maurer =

German footballer (born 1996)

Personal information
- Date of birth: 22 May 1996 (age 30)
- Place of birth: Bernau bei Berlin, Germany
- Height: 1.78 m (5 ft 10 in)
- Position: Right winger

Team information
- Current team: SG Zepernick
- Number: 7

Youth career
- 2002–2008: FSV Bernau
- 2008–2009: BFC Dynamo
- 2009–2014: Energie Cottbus

Senior career*
Years	Team	Apps	(Gls)
2014–2016	Energie Cottbus II	50	(16)
2014–2016	Energie Cottbus	15	(0)
2016–2018	Lokomotive Leipzig	60	(17)
2018–2019	FC Köln II	18	(2)
2019–2020	Union Fürstenwalde	15	(2)
2020–2022	VSG Altglienicke	0	(0)
2024–	SG Zepernick	0	(0)
- * Club domestic league appearances and goals as of 15 May 2022

Paul Maurer (born 22 May 1996) is a German footballer who plays as a right winger for German amateur side SG Zepernick.

== Career ==
Maurer made his professional debut for Energie Cottbus in the 3. Liga on 9 May 2015, coming on as a substitute in the 76th minute for Nikolas Ledgerwood in the 0–3 home loss against Borussia Dortmund II.

In June 2024, Maurer signed with German amateur side SG Einheit Zepernick, after two years without a club.
