= Alex Finney (footballer, born 1996) =

English footballer

Personal information
- Full name: Alex Connor Finney
- Date of birth: 6 June 1996 (age 30)
- Place of birth: Huddersfield, England
- Position: Centre-back

Youth career
- –2013: Leyton Orient

Senior career*
Years	Team	Apps	(Gls)
2013–2014	Leyton Orient	0	(0)
2014–2016	Bolton Wanderers	2	(0)
2016–2018	Queens Park Rangers	0	(0)
2017–2018	→ Maidstone United (loan)	13	(1)
2018	→ Maidstone United (loan)	13	(1)
2018	Maidstone United	20	(0)
2018–2021	Aldershot Town	49	(0)
2021–2023	Ebbsfleet United	19	(1)
2023–2024	Eastbourne Borough	12	(0)
2024–2025	Eastbourne Borough	0	(0)
- * Club domestic league appearances and goals as of 23:28, 16 March 2024 (UTC)

Alex Connor Finney (born 6 June 1996) is an English footballer who most recently played as a centre-back for Eastbourne Borough. He previously played for Bolton Wanderers, Queens Park Rangers, Maidstone United, Aldershot Town and Ebbsfleet United.

== Career ==
=== Bolton Wanderers ===
Finney began his career with Bolton Wanderers. He started in the youth ranks at Leyton Orient before joining Bolton in 2014. He made his debut for the club on 19 September 2015 when he came on as a late substitute for Stephen Dobbie in Bolton's 4–1 defeat to Huddersfield Town. He left the club by mutual consent on 12 August 2016, three days after appearing in a League Cup defeat at Blackpool.

=== Queens Park Rangers ===
After being without a club for 3 months Finney signed for Queens Park Rangers on 18 November 2016.

He left the club at the end of the 2017/18 season, failing to make a senior appearance.

=== Maidstone United ===
On 3 August 2017, it was announced that Finney would play for Maidstone United on loan until 6 January 2018, he was ruled out of the final few weeks of his loan after breaking his jaw in two places on Boxing Day 2017. On 22 January it was announced that Maidstone United would be extending Finney's loan until the end of the 2017/18 season. Finney was named Maidstone United's Player of the Season. On 18 June 2018 it was announced that Finney had signed a two-year deal to stay at Maidstone

=== Aldershot Town ===
On 21 December 2018, Aldershot Town announced the signing of Finney from Maidstone United.

=== Ebbsfleet United ===
On 28 July 2021, Finney joined National League South side Ebbsfleet United.

=== Eastbourne Borough ===
On 23 June 2023, Finney joined National League South side Eastbourne Borough.

On 6 December 2024, Finney re-signed for Eastbourne Borough, having been injured since March 2024.

== Career statistics ==
As of match played 7 December 2024

Appearances and goals by club, season and competition
Club	Season	League			FA Cup		League Cup		Other		Total	
Club	Season	Division	Apps	Goals	Apps	Goals	Apps	Goals	Apps	Goals	Apps	Goals
Leyton Orient	2013–14	League One	0	0	0	0	0	0	0	0	0	0
Bolton Wanderers	2014–15	Championship	0	0	0	0	0	0	—		0	0
Bolton Wanderers	2015–16	Championship	2	0	0	0	0	0	—		2	0
Bolton Wanderers	2016–17	League One	0	0	0	0	1	0	0	0	1	0
Bolton Wanderers	Total		2	0	0	0	1	0	0	0	3	0
Queens Park Rangers	2017–18	Championship	0	0	0	0	0	0	0	0	0	0
Maidstone United (loan)	2017–18	National League	26	2	4	1	—		1 (Note: Appearance in the FA Trophy)	0	31	3
Maidstone United	2018–19	National League	20	0	3	0	—		1	0	24	0
Aldershot Town	2018–19	National League	15	0	0	0	—		0	0	15	0
Aldershot Town	2019–20	National League	23	0	0	0	—		0	0	23	0
Aldershot Town	2020–21	National League	11	0	0	0	—		0	0	11	0
Aldershot Town	Total		49	0	0	0	0	0	0	0	49	0
Ebbsfleet United	2021–22	National League South	10	1	1	0	—		0	0	11	1
Ebbsfleet United	2022–23	National League South	9	0	0	0	—		0	0	9	0
Ebbsfleet United	Total		19	1	1	0	—		0	0	20	1
Eastbourne Borough	2023–24	National League South	12	0	0	0	—		0	0	12	0
Eastbourne Borough	2024–25	National League South	0	0	0	0	—		1	0	1	0
Eastbourne Borough	Total		12	0	0	0	—		1	0	13	0
Career total			128	3	8	1	1	0	3	0	140	4
