= Jack Williams (footballer, born 1997) =

English footballer

Personal information
- Full name: Jack Dennis Williams
- Date of birth: 11 September 1997 (age 29)
- Place of birth: Hillingdon, England
- Position: Left-back

Youth career
- 2008–2016: Queens Park Rangers

Senior career*
Years	Team	Apps	(Gls)
2016–2019	Queens Park Rangers	0	(0)
2017	→ Bishop's Stortford (work experience)	8	(0)
2017–2018	→ Wycombe Wanderers (loan)	1	(0)
- * Club domestic league appearances and goals as of 17:12, 2 August 2017 (UTC)

Jack Dennis Williams (born 11 September 1997) is an English footballer who plays as a defender.

== Career ==
=== Queens Park Rangers ===
Williams joined the QPR Academy as a nine-year old. On 10 March 2017, he joined Bishop's Stortford on work experience, where he made 8 appearances in the National League South. On 7 January 2019, Williams left the club after his registration was cancelled.

==== Wycombe Wanderers (loan) ====
On 31 July 2017 Williams joined Wycombe Wanderers on loan, he made his professional debut against Fulham in the EFL Cup on 8 August 2017 and he made his League Two debut on 19 August 2017 against Notts County.

== Career statistics ==
As of match played 28 November 2017

Appearances and goals by club, season and competition
Club	Season	League			FA Cup		League Cup		Other		Total	
Club	Season	Division	Apps	Goals	Apps	Goals	Apps	Goals	Apps	Goals	Apps	Goals
Bishop's Stortford (loan)	2016–17	National League South	8	0	0	0	~	~	0	0	8	0
Wycombe Wanderers (loan)	2017–18	League Two	1	0	0	0	1	0	2 (Note: Appearance in the Football League Trophy)	0	4	0
Career total			9	0	0	0	1	0	2	0	12	0
