= Manchester United F.C. 8–2 Arsenal F.C. =

Manchester United v Arsenal
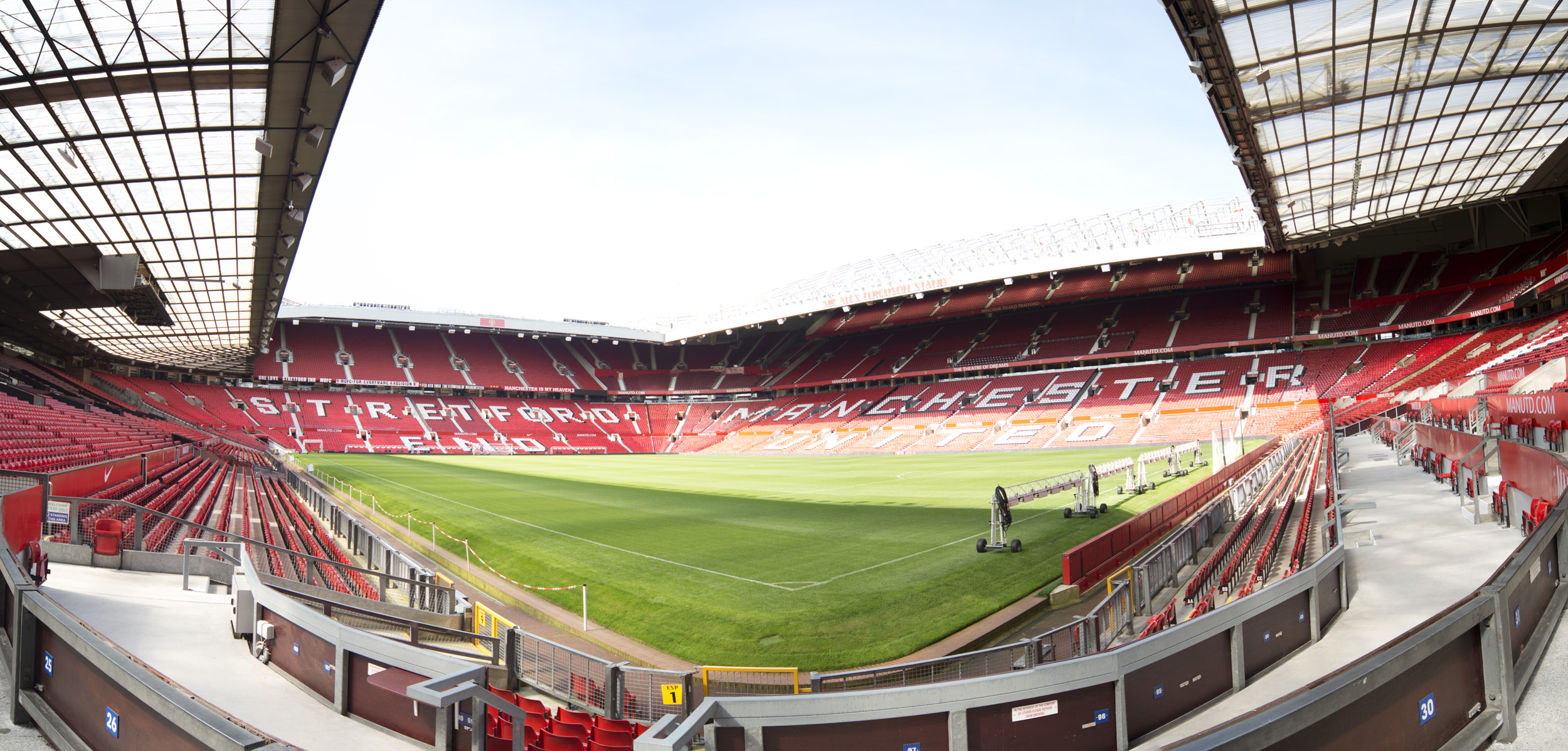
- The match was played at Old Trafford in Manchester.
- Event: 2011–12 Premier League
Manchester United	Arsenal
8	2
- Date: 28 August 2011
- Venue: Old Trafford, Trafford, Greater Manchester
- Man of the Match: Wayne Rooney (Manchester United)
- Referee: Howard Webb
- Attendance: 75,448
- Weather: Clear

The first fixture between Manchester United and Arsenal in the 2011–12 Premier League season was played on 28 August 2011 at Old Trafford in Manchester. Manchester United won the match 8–2, making it Arsenal's heaviest league defeat since 1927, 84 years earlier, when they lost 7–0 to West Ham United in the old Football League First Division. It was also the first time they had conceded eight goals in a game since 1896, when they lost 8–0 to the now defunct Loughborough in the old Second Division.

== Background ==
Fixtures between Manchester United and Arsenal had seen a number of controversial incidents in prior seasons. The rivalry between the two clubs grew more intense since the formation of the Premier League in 1992.

Before the game, United manager Alex Ferguson took a shot at Arsenal manager Arsène Wenger's record in recent years, saying he would "not have allowed" such a barren run without trophies, but sympathised with him regarding the recent sales of Cesc Fàbregas and Samir Nasri, citing his experience with the sale of Cristiano Ronaldo, and claiming he was irreplaceable for Arsenal.

Manchester United had started the defence of their title by winning the opening two matches, while Arsenal were looking for their first win of the league season, having drawn the opening match against Newcastle United, before losing to Liverpool on 20 August 2011.

== Match ==
=== Team selection ===
Manchester United manager Sir Alex Ferguson picked the same starting XI to play against Arsenal as had beaten Tottenham Hotspur six days earlier, a side that had only seen three changes from their opening-day win at West Bromwich Albion. Centre-back Rio Ferdinand missed the match against Tottenham with a hamstring injury, but had returned to training ahead of the Arsenal game; however, he was only deemed fit enough for a place on the bench against Arsenal, and with defensive partner Nemanja Vidić also out with a calf problem, Jonny Evans and summer signing Phil Jones continued at the back. Right-back Rafael was a long-term injury concern with a dislocated shoulder, so Chris Smalling continued in his place, while Patrice Evra captained the side from left-back and David de Gea played in goal for the fourth game in a row after signing from Atlético Madrid in the summer. The midfield and forward lines were the same as in the two previous games, with Tom Cleverley as the only change from the Community Shield, when he had come on for Michael Carrick at half-time. Darren Fletcher was in contention for a place in the team after a long-term stomach virus infection, but missed out on selection, while Javier Hernández was only picked on the bench for the second game in a row as he continued his recovery from a concussion sustained on the club's pre-season tour of the United States; Danny Welbeck started alongside Wayne Rooney in attack.

Arsenal went into the match with more selection issues, having had a player sent off in each of their first two games of the season, which meant Gervinho and Emmanuel Frimpong were ineligible to play, as was Alex Song, who had been charged with violent conduct and was serving a three-game suspension for a stamp on Newcastle United's Joey Barton on the opening day of the season. Wojciech Szczęsny started in goal, having won the job from Łukasz Fabiański midway through the previous season. In defence, Laurent Koscielny recovered from a back injury that had ruled him out of Arsenal's UEFA Champions League win over Udinese four days earlier to partner Johan Djourou in the middle; Armand Traoré started on the left in place of Kieran Gibbs, who had a hamstring injury, while Bacary Sagna was left out entirely, and 19-year-old Carl Jenkinson played on the right. In the absence of Jack Wilshere and Abou Diaby due to injury, manager Arsène Wenger picked a three-man midfield of Aaron Ramsey, Tomáš Rosický and Francis Coquelin, who was making his league debut for the club. Up front, as expected, Theo Walcott started on the right, Andrey Arshavin on the left and captain Robin van Persie played through the middle.

=== Summary ===
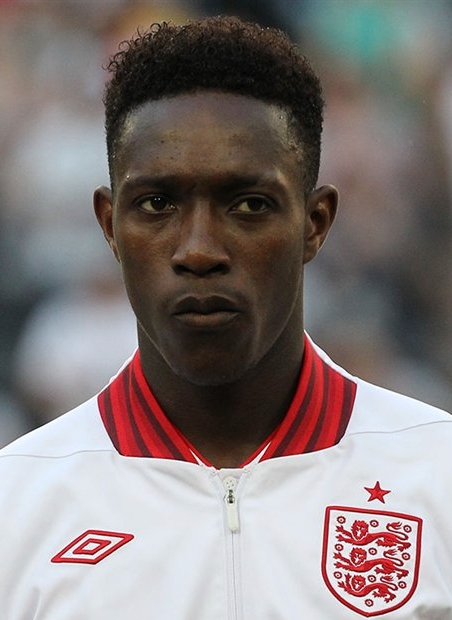
Danny Welbeck opened the scoring for Manchester United before going off injured.

==== First half ====
The match kicked off at around 16:00 GMT in front of a crowd of 75,448 at Manchester United's stadium, Old Trafford. United opened the scoring in the 22nd minute, when Welbeck beat Djourou to a scooped pass from Anderson and headed the ball past Szczęsny. Arsenal had a chance to level the scores five minutes later, when they were awarded a penalty for a foul on Walcott by Evans; however, De Gea correctly guessed the direction of Van Persie's penalty kick and pushed the ball around the post. A minute later, Traoré could only clear a cross from Rooney as far as Ashley Young, who controlled the ball, shifted it onto his right foot and curled a shot into the top corner to score his first goal for Manchester United since signing from Aston Villa that summer.

In the 35th minute, Welbeck suffered a hamstring injury and was substituted by Hernández. Rooney scored his 150th Manchester United goal in the 41st minute, from a free kick awarded for a foul on Young by Jenkinson, who was booked; Rooney rolled the ball to Young, who stopped it, changing the angle for Rooney to curl it around the defensive wall into the top corner. Arsenal did ultimately pull a goal back in injury time at the end of the first half, when a clearance from Evra only went as far as Ramsey; after Arshavin and Rosický combined on the edge of the penalty area, Van Persie allowed the ball to run through to Walcott, who shot through De Gea's legs for Arsenal's first league goal of the season.

==== Second half ====
It took almost 20 minutes of the second half for either side to score again, but it was Manchester United who did so in the 64th minute from another Rooney free kick; after he was fouled by Djourou on the edge of the Arsenal penalty area, he ran the same set-piece routine as for his earlier goal with the same result. Three minutes later, Rooney was again involved, as he provided the assist for an unmarked Nani to lob Szczęsny from near the penalty spot; that was to be Nani's last contribution to the match as he and Anderson were substituted by Ryan Giggs and Park Ji-sung. Park was involved quickly, first setting up Rooney for a lobbed shot over Szczęsny that came back off the post before combining with Young to find some space on the edge of the box and shooting low past Szczęsny into the far corner of the net to make the score 6–1. Van Persie pulled another one back for Arsenal in the 74th minute; after a cross from Jenkinson was headed away by Jones, Jenkinson headed the ball back across the penalty area, where Van Persie beat De Gea at his near post with a powerful left-footed shot.

Two minutes later, Jenkinson received a second yellow card and was sent off for a professional foul on Hernández, who was through on goal, meaning Arsenal had had a player dismissed in each of their first three games of the season. Rooney completed his hat-trick, the sixth of his Manchester United career, in the 80th minute with a penalty kick awarded for a foul by Walcott on Evra. Young made it 8–2 in injury time at the end of the game with a curling shot from just inside the penalty area on the left-hand side.

=== Details ===
28 August 2011
16:00

Manchester United	8–2	Arsenal
Welbeck 22'; Young 28', 90+1'; Rooney 41', 64', 82' (pen.); Nani 67'; Park Ji-sung 70'	Report	Walcott 45+3'; Van Persie 74'

Old Trafford, Manchester
Attendance: 75,448
Referee: Howard Webb

Manchester United	Arsenal

GK	1	(Spain) David de Gea
RB	12	(England) Chris Smalling
CB	4	(England) Phil Jones
CB	6	(Northern Ireland) Jonny Evans	(yellow card) 27'
LB	3	(France) Patrice Evra (c)
RM	17	(Portugal) Nani		(substituted off) 68'
CM	23	(England) Tom Cleverley
CM	8	(Brazil) Anderson		(substituted off) 68'
LM	18	(England) Ashley Young	(yellow card) 27'
CF	10	(England) Wayne Rooney
CF	19	(England) Danny Welbeck		(substituted off) 36'
Substitutes:
GK	34	(Denmark) Anders Lindegaard
DF	5	(England) Rio Ferdinand
DF	20	(Brazil) Fábio
MF	11	(Wales) Ryan Giggs		(substituted on) 68'
MF	13	(South Korea) Park Ji-sung		(substituted on) 68'
FW	9	(Bulgaria) Dimitar Berbatov
FW	14	(Mexico) Javier Hernández		(substituted on) 36'
Manager:
(Scotland) Sir Alex Ferguson

GK	13	(Poland) Wojciech Szczęsny
RB	25	(England) Carl Jenkinson	(yellow card) 40' (yellow-red card) 77'
CB	20	(Switzerland) Johan Djourou	(yellow card) 63'
CB	6	(France) Laurent Koscielny
LB	30	(Senegal) Armand Traoré
CM	16	(Wales) Aaron Ramsey
CM	39	(France) Francis Coquelin		(substituted off) 62'
CM	7	(Czech Republic) Tomáš Rosický
RF	14	(England) Theo Walcott		(substituted off) 84'
CF	10	(Netherlands) Robin van Persie (c)		(substituted off) 84'
LF	23	(Russia) Andrey Arshavin	(yellow card) 15'
Substitutes:
GK	21	(Poland) Łukasz Fabiański
DF	49	(Spain) Ignasi Miquel
MF	46	(England) Henri Lansbury		(substituted on) 84'
MF	53	(Turkey) Oğuzhan Özyakup
FW	15	(England) Alex Oxlade-Chamberlain		(substituted on) 62'
FW	29	(Morocco) Marouane Chamakh		(substituted on) 84'
FW	54	(France) Gilles Sunu
Manager:
(France) Arsène Wenger

Match officials

- Assistant referees:
  - Darren Cann
  - Mick McDonough
- Fourth official:
  - Lee Mason

Match rules

- 90 minutes
- No extra time or penalties
- Seven named substitutes, of which up to three may be used

=== Statistics ===
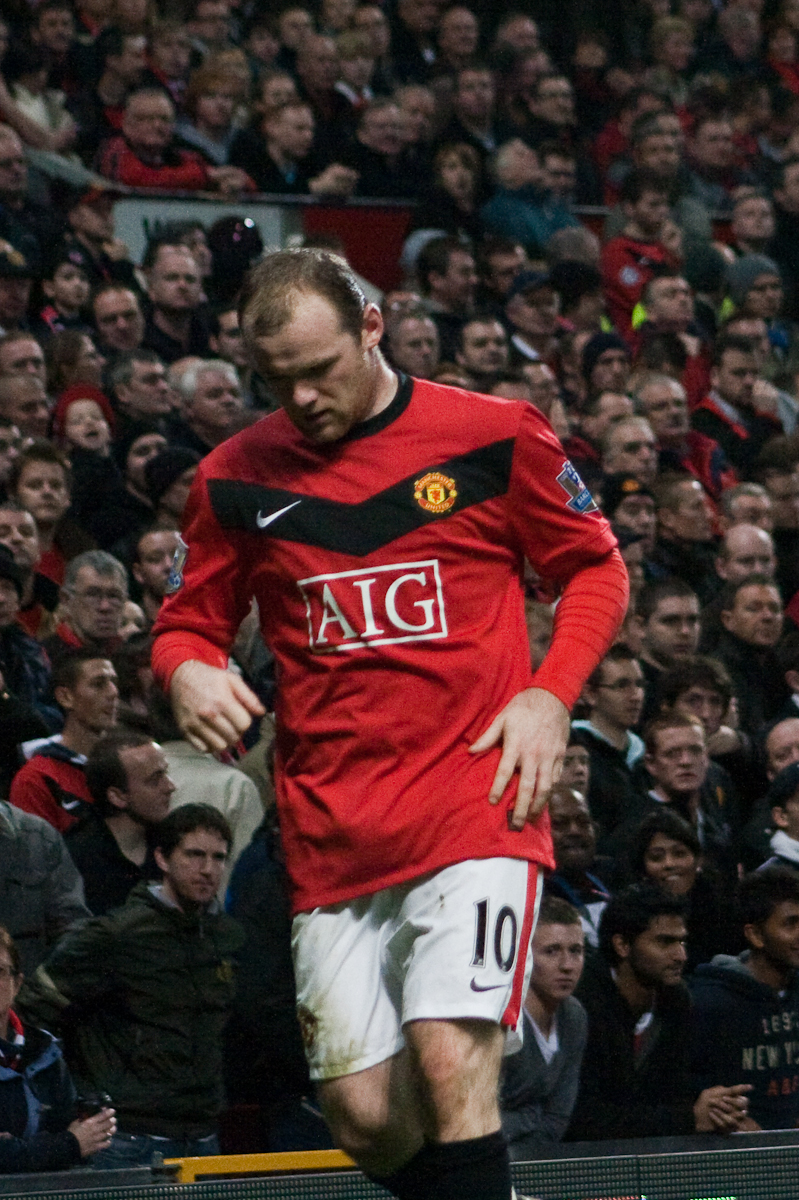
Wayne Rooney scored a hat-trick.

Statistic	Manchester United	Arsenal
Goals scored	8	2
Possession	56.3%	43.7%
Shots on target	14	8
Shots off target	10	6
Blocked shots	1	6
Passing success	86.5%	80.1%
Corner kicks	3	5
Fouls	9	8
Tackles success	67.7%	53.3%
Offsides	7	0
Yellow cards	2	2
Red cards	0	1
Source: Sky Sports

== Aftermath ==
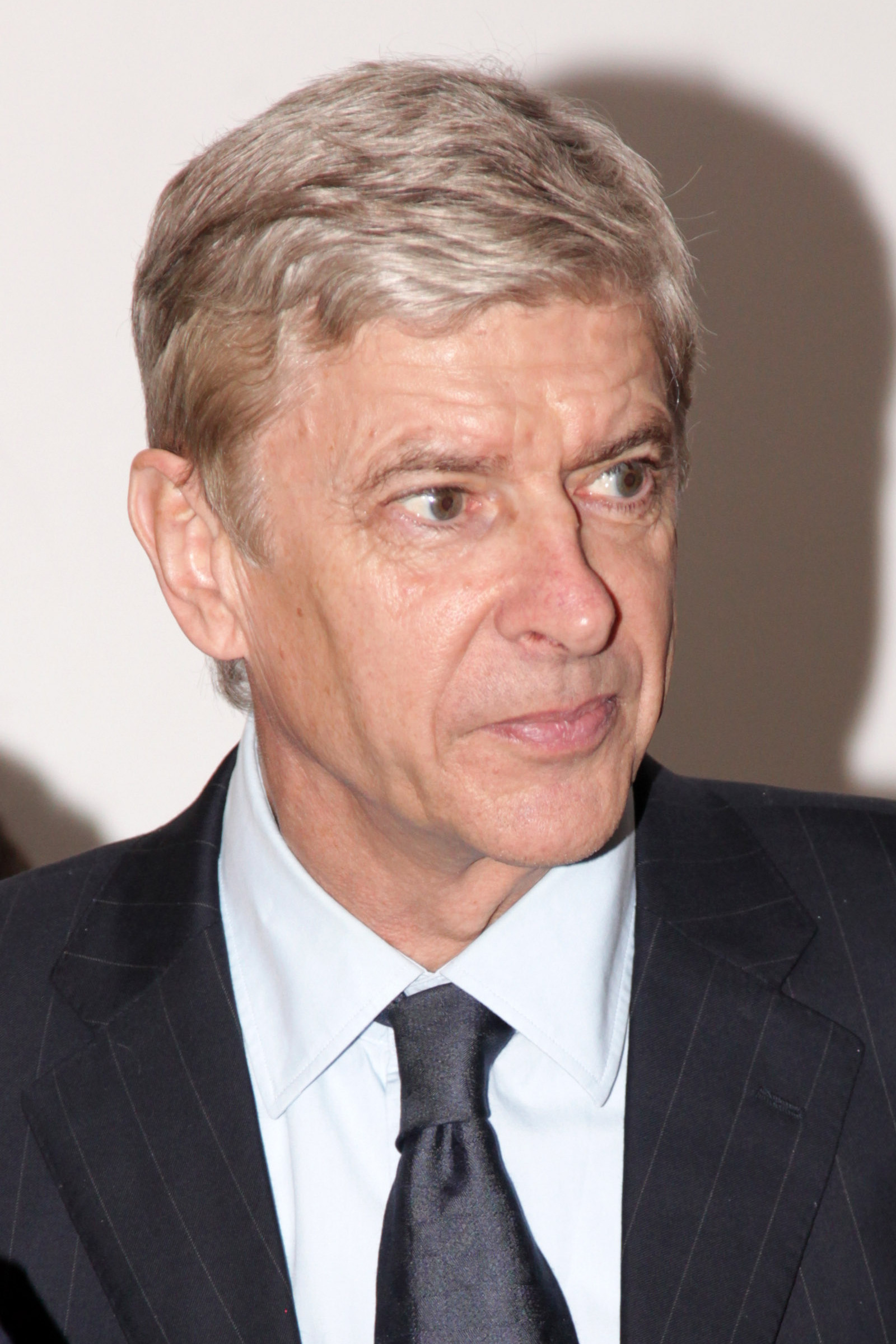
Arsenal manager Arsène Wenger signed four new players after the game.

Speaking to BBC Sport after the game, Arsène Wenger described the result as "humiliating", but claimed it "was not a one-sided game". Wenger offered his apologies to the club's 3,000 supporters who had travelled to the game, with the club offering free tickets to a future away fixture. Ferguson was empathetic towards Wenger, saying "he has been a big adversary and will continue to be when he gets his big players back".

Wenger moved quickly to strengthen his squad, signing South Korean striker Park Chu-young from Monaco, Brazilian André Santos from Fenerbahçe, German defender Per Mertesacker from Werder Bremen, and Spanish midfielder Mikel Arteta from Everton, as well as loaning Yossi Benayoun from rivals Chelsea. Defender Armand Traoré was the first casualty of the defeat, being quickly sold to newly promoted Queens Park Rangers.

In a poll conducted by broadcaster Sky Sports in 2017, United supporters voted it as the club's greatest ever match in the Premier League.

Despite the strength of the victory, Manchester United went on to have a trophyless season, though they came close to winning the league, finishing level with Manchester City on 89 points; the league title was decided by goal difference for the first time, with Manchester City taking the title following a last minute winner by Sergio Agüero over QPR to give City a dramatic 3–2 comeback win and an eight-goal advantage over their city rivals. Arsenal finished in third place on 70 points.

== See also ==
- 2011–12 Premier League
- 2011–12 Arsenal F.C. season
- 2011–12 Manchester United F.C. season
