= Armand Traoré =

Senegalese footballer (born 1989)

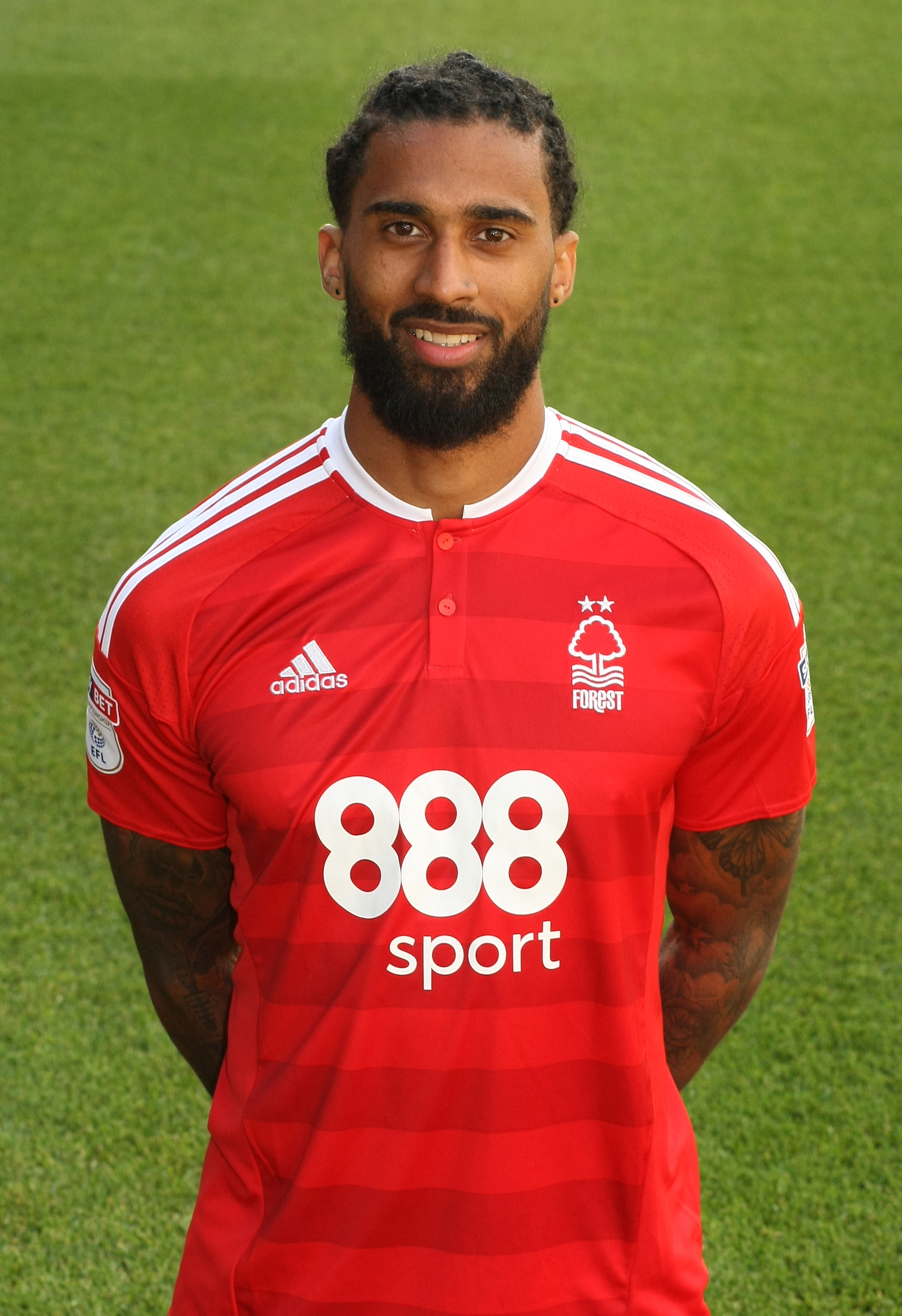
- Traoré with Nottingham Forest in 2016

Personal information
- Full name: Armand Mouhamed Traoré
- Date of birth: 8 October 1989 (age 37)
- Place of birth: Châtenay-Malabry, France
- Height: 1.85 m (6 ft 1 in)
- Position: Left back

Youth career
- 1996–1999: Suresnes
- 1999–2004: Racing Paris
- 2004–2005: Monaco
- 2005–2006: Arsenal

Senior career*
Years	Team	Apps	(Gls)
2006–2011	Arsenal	13	(0)
2008–2009	→ Portsmouth (loan)	19	(1)
2010–2011	→ Juventus (loan)	10	(0)
2011–2016	Queens Park Rangers	87	(2)
2016–2018	Nottingham Forest	30	(0)
2018	→ Cardiff City (loan)	4	(1)
2018–2019	Çaykur Rizespor	0	(0)
2019–2020	Cardiff City	0	(0)
Total		163	(4)

International career
2007–2008	France U19	4	(0)
2008–2010	France U21	5	(0)
2011–2018	Senegal	7	(0)
- * Club domestic league appearances and goals

Armand Mouhamed Traoré (born 8 October 1989) is a former professional footballer who played as a left back. Traoré is a product of the Arsenal Academy. Born in France, he represented France at under-19 and under-21 levels, but since opted to represent his parents' native country, Senegal, at senior level.

== Club career ==
=== Arsenal ===
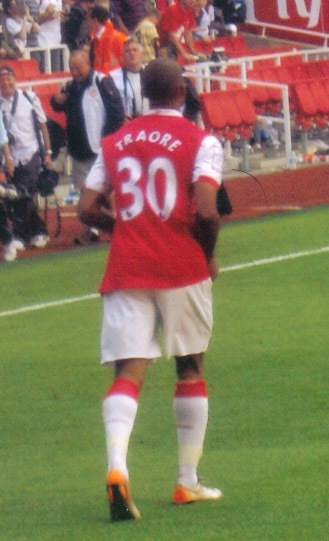
Traoré playing for Arsenal in 2008.

Born in Châtenay-Malabry, France, son of Isabelle and Abdoulaye Traoré, Armand Traoré started out his football youth career at Suresnes, at Racing Paris and Monaco. Traoré joined Arsenal on 1 August 2005. Although mainly a reserve team member, making six appearances in the FA Premier Reserve League in 2005–06, he played in Dennis Bergkamp's testimonial against Ajax in the first game at Emirates Stadium in July 2006.

Traoré was an unused member of Arsenal's 18-man squad for their UEFA Champions League match against Dinamo Zagreb the following month. He went on to sign a professional contract with the club in August 2006 before making his first team debut in the League Cup in a third round match against West Bromwich Albion on 24 October, as a 24th minute substitute for Emmanuel Adebayor. Traoré went on to start in a League Cup match against Everton which was won by 1–0 margin at Goodison Park. He then played away to Liverpool in a 6–3 quarterfinal win. Traore was in the starting line-up for both semi-final legs against Tottenham Hotspur which was won 5–3 on aggregate. He then played in the final against Chelsea, which Arsenal lost 2–1. On 28 February 2007, Traoré started the FA Cup quarter-final replay against Blackburn Rovers in a 1–0 defeat at Ewood Park. At the end of the 2006–07 season, he made seven appearances in all competitions.

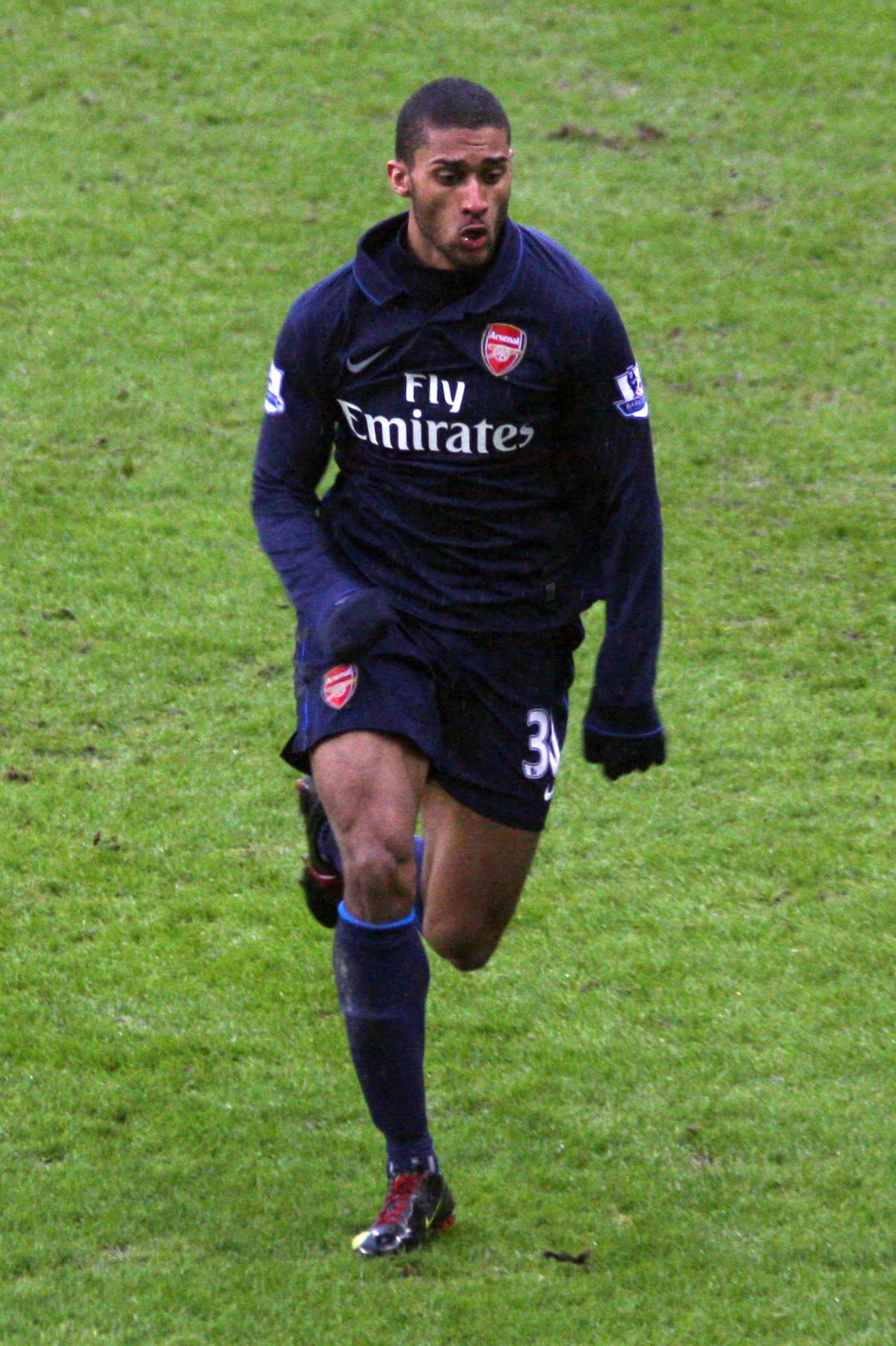
Traoré playing for Arsenal in 2010.

At the beginning of the 2007–08 campaign, Traoré said he wanted to prove his quality to manager Arsène Wenger. Traoré put in numerous impressive performances for the Reserves and even scored a few goals including a spectacular long-range effort against Tottenham Reserves. In September 2007, Traoré returned to White Hart Lane, but this time only as a spectator when he was arrested for carrying knuckle dusters into the stadium. Traoré and a friend were taken into custody for questioning for the duration of the game, and he was given a formal warning. Traoré later apologised the situation and said that he did not know it was wrong because the laws were different in France. At the same month, Traoré set up the club's first goal of the game, in a 2–0 win against Newcastle United in the second round of the League Cup. It wasn't until on 18 December 2007 when he made his first appearance for Arsenal in three months against Blackburn Rovers in the fourth round of League Cup, starting the match and played 120 minutes to help the side win 3–2. Traoré then started Arsenal's FA Cup tie against Burnley, before being replaced by Justin Hoyte in the 71st minute. He played in both legs of the League Cup semi–finals against rivals, Tottenham Hotspur, as the club lost 6–2 on aggregate. After appearing on the bench during the club's 3–1 Premier League victory over Manchester City on 2 February 2008 without making it onto the pitch, Traoré started and played the full 90 minutes against Manchester United at Old Trafford in a 4–0 defeat in the FA Cup fifth round on 16 February 2008. He finally received his Premier League debut on 5 April 2008, against Liverpool, as they drew 1–1. Traoré was used as a left-winger in Arsenal's final two league matches of the 2007–08 season, supplying the cross which led to Nicklas Bendtner's winner against Everton. At the end of the season, he made eleven appearances in all competitions. It was announced on 4 August 2008 that Traoré signed a long-term contract extension with Arsenal.

Traoré returned to Arsenal in the summer of 2009 and was determined to fight for his place in the first team. He thereafter played in Arsenal's 2–0 win over West Bromwich Albion in the League Cup, for up to 61 minutes before being replaced by Nacer Barazite. Due to Gaël Clichy and Kieran Gibbs both incurring injuries, Traoré stepped up to the starting left-back position. He made his first start of the season against Sunderland, as they lost 1–0 on 21 November 2009. This was followed up by starting in the next two matches in a 3–0 loss at home to Chelsea and a 2–1 win over Liverpool at Anfield. Traoré himself became injured and missed a few matches, but returned against Aston Villa in a 3–0 win on 27 December 2009. He then made four more starts for the side but struggled in the matches against Everton and Bolton Wanderers. His form reportedly attracted the interest of Paris Saint-Germain and Traoré was forced to strenuously deny reports he was set to move to France. Clichy's return forced Traoré out of the side until May's trip to Blackburn Rovers, but the defender had proved he was a more-than-capable understudy, helping the Gunners close the gap at the top of the Premier League table. At the end of the 2009–10 season, he made fourteen appearances in all competitions.

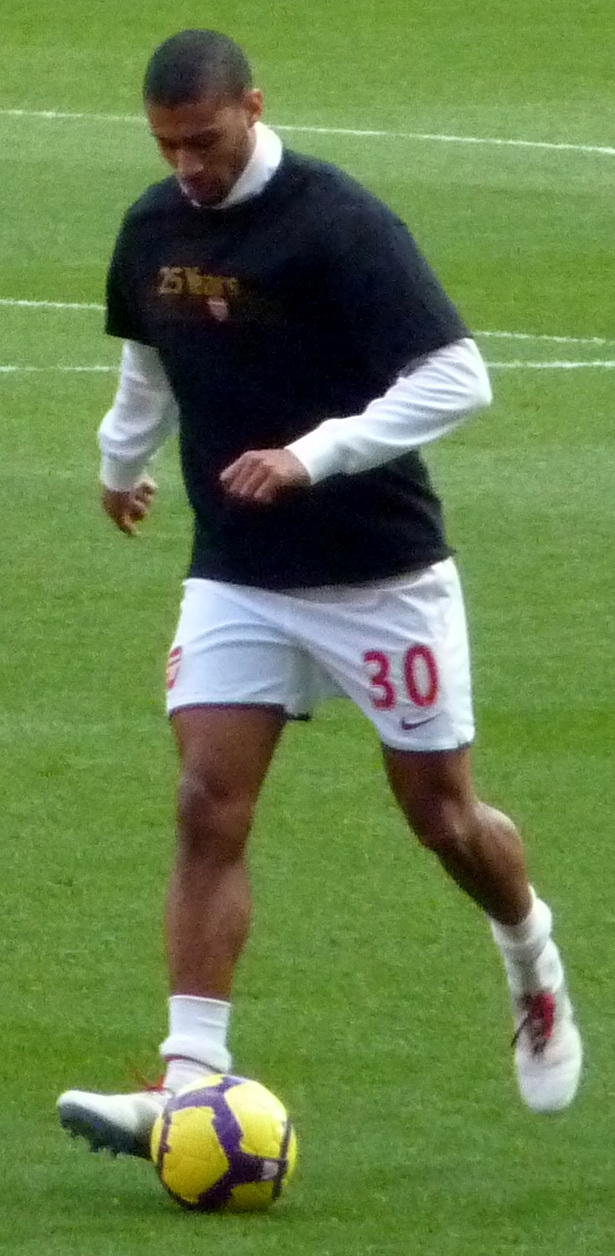
Traoré warming up for Arsenal in 2010.

Traoré made his first appearance of the 2011–12 season, coming on as an 86th-minute substitute, against Udinese in the second leg as Arsenal came from behind to win 2–1 and 3–1 on aggregate which helped Arsenal secure qualification for the lucrative group stage of the competition for the 14th straight season. On 28 August 2011, he played for the full 90 minutes as a left-back against Manchester United at Old Trafford in an 8–2 league loss. It was reported on 29 August 2011 that Traore was on a verge of moving to newly promoted Premier League side Queens Park Rangers after passing his medical. Altogether, he capped a sum of 32 times with the Gunners.

==== Loan spells from Arsenal ====
On 21 August 2008, Traoré signed a season-long loan deal with Portsmouth to gain valuable first-team experience and was given the jersey number 30, the same jersey number that he wore at Arsenal. He made his debut for Portsmouth against Manchester United at Fratton Park, playing the first 56 minutes of the game before being replaced by Jerome Thomas. As so Traoré went on to register an assist in Portsmouth's 1–1 draw to Tottenham Hotspur at White Hart Lane. He had enjoyed a fair amount of playing time in the early part of his loan spell, being utilised as a left midfielder. However, by way of injuries, Traoré's playing chances soon became limited. Traoré then scored his first Premier League goal on 18 May 2009 at home to Sunderland in an eventual win 3–1 league win. Altogether he made 19 appearances in the Premier League being capped 28 times as a whole and scored one goal with Portsmouth. Following his end to his loan spell at the club, Traoré reflected his time at Portsmouth, stating that it helped him improve as a player.

On 31 August 2010, Traoré joined Italian giants Juventus on a season-long loan and was given the shirt number 17, previously worn by David Trezeguet, who recently left the club. Due to an injury, he missed almost three months of the season before finally making his debut on 13 November 2010 against Roma, coming on as a 45th minute substitute for Fabio Grosso. The match ended 1–1 with the goals scored by Vincenzo Iaquinta and Francesco Totti. Traoré made his first start for Juventus on 1 December 2010 in a UEFA Europa League match against Lech Poznań, playing 83 minutes before being substituted out in an eventual 1–1 draw. He made his first start in Serie A on 10 January 2011, in a 3–0 loss to Napoli. After a return from a short injury, Traoré started in the matches against Milan and Cesena. After missing one match due to injury, he returned to the starting line–up on 10 April 2011 and played the full 90 minutes in a 3–2 win against Genoa. Traoré spent most of his time with Juventus on the substitutes' bench, making only ten Serie A appearances. At the end of the season, it was confirmed he would return to Arsenal. On 24 May 2011, he played his last match for Juventus against Manchester United at Old Trafford in Gary Neville's testimonial match. Traoré then returned from his loan at Juventus in the summer of 2011.

=== Queens Park Rangers ===
On 30 August 2011, Traoré completed a move to Queens Park Rangers, signing a three-year contract for an undisclosed transfer fee, which understood to be costing The Hoops £1.3 million.

On 12 September 2011, Traoré made his Queens Park Rangers debut, starting a match and played 51 minutes before being substituted for Matthew Connolly, in a 0–0 draw against Newcastle United. In a follow–up match against Wolverhampton Wanderers on 17 September 2011, he set up two goals; setting up the first for Alejandro Faurlín in the tenth minute and the second for DJ Campbell in the 86th minute, in a 3–0 win. However, in a follow–up match against Aston Villa on 25 September 2011, Traoré was sent off in the 90th minute in a 1–1 draw. Following the match, QPR manager Neil Warnock described his sending off as an "absolute disgrace". Despite the sending off and suffered injuries along the way, he continued to remain in the first team, playing in either the left–back and left midfield positions. This lasted until Traoré was called up by Senegal for the 2012 African Cup of Nations. Following Senegal's elimination in the tournament, he made his first team return on 4 February 2012 against Wolverhampton Wanderers, coming on as a 65th-minute substitute, in a 2–1 loss. Traoré then appeared in the next five matches. However, Traoré suffered a hamstring injury that kept him out for four matches. It wasn't until on 14 April 2012 when he returned from injury, coming on as a 77th-minute substitute, in a 1–0 loss against West Bromwich Albion. In the last match of the season, against Manchester City, and needing a win to keep the club in the Premier League at the expense of Bolton Wanderers, Traoré came on as a substitute for Djibril Cissé in the 59th minute; seven minutes later, he provided a cross from which Jamie Mackie scored a header, leading to a shock 2–1 lead. However, Manchester City managed to score twice in injury time, resulting in them winning the 2011–12 Premier League title by an epic 3-2 come-from-behind victory. Notwithstanding, QPR retained their Premier League status for 2012–13 after Bolton drew 2–2 with Stoke City, resulting in Bolton's relegation to the Championship. At the end of the 2011–12 season, he went on to make twenty–three appearances in all competitions.

At the start of the 2012–13 season, however, Traoré suffered an ankle injury that saw him miss the opening game of the season. It wasn't until on 25 August 2012 when he returned to the starting line–up and played 70 minutes before being substituted, in a 1–1 draw against Norwich City. His return was short–lived when Traoré suffered a leg injury that kept him out for a month. It wasn't until on 6 October 2012 when he returned to the first team, coming on as a second half substitute, in a 3–2 loss against West Bromwich Albion. Since returning from injury, Traoré regained his first team place, playing in the left–back position despite suffering minor injuries along the way. However, he suffered a knee injury that saw him miss two matches. Traoré didn't return to the first team until on 19 January 2013, coming on as a 58th-minute substitute, in a 1–1 draw against West Ham United. Following a 4–2 loss against Milton Keynes Dons in the fourth round of the FA Cup, his performance was singled out criticism by Manager Harry Redknapp. Shortly after, he was able to make amends from his mistake by helping Queens Park Rangers keep two consecutive clean sheets against Manchester City and Norwich City. However, Queens Park Rangers was eventually relegated to the Championship following a 0–0 draw against Reading on 28 April 2013. Despite suffering two injuries along the way, Traoré made twenty–eight appearances in all competitions.

Ahead of the 2013–14 season, the club attempted to sell Traoré following Queens Park Rangers' relegation to the Championship, but stayed in the end. Having started in the opening game of the season against Sheffield Wednesday, he was sidelined on two separate occasions. Upon returning to the first team, Traoré found himself placed on the substitute bench and didn't play for two months. It wasn't until on 3 December 2013 when he came on as an 81st-minute substitute, in a 3–0 win against AFC Bournemouth. It wasn't until on 11 January 2014 when Traoré scored his first goal for Queens Park Rangers, in a 3–1 win against Ipswich Town. Soon after, Traoré began playing in the left midfield position for the next two months. His performance saw him earn the February AirAsia Player of the Month award. However, during a 3–0 win against Yeovil Town on 15 March 2014, he suffered a hamstring injury, resulting in his substitution in the 44th minute. After missing four matches, Traoré returned to the starting line–up against Bournemouth on 5 April 2014 and scored in a 2–1 loss. However during a match, he suffered a knee injury that kept him out for three matches. It wasn't until on 21 April 2014 when he returned to the starting line–up and played 81 minutes before being substituted, in a 2–1 win against Watford. A week later on 3 May 2014 in the last game of the season against Barnsley, Traoré set up the club's third goal of the game, in a 3–2 win. With Queens Park Rangers, he reached the 2014's Championship playoff final which the Hoops won 1–0 against Derby County at Wembley. At the end of the 2013–14 season, Traoré made twenty–four appearances and scoring two times in all competitions.

Ahead of the 2014–15 season, Traoré was linked a move away from Queens Park Rangers, as Crystal Palace, which was managed by Neil Warnock was keen to sign him. But he ended the transfer speculation by signing a two–year contract with the club. At the start the 2014–15 season, Traoré became a first team regular for Queens Park Rangers, rotating in either the left–back and left–midfield positions. However, he found his playing time, mostly coming from the substitute bench, as well as, facing competition from fellow left–back, Clint Hill and his own injury concern that affected most of the 2014–15 season. Eventually, Traoré suffered a calf injury that saw him miss the rest of the 2014–15 season. Eventually, the club was eventually relegated to the Championship for the second time. At the end of the 2014–15 season, he went on to make seventeen appearances in all competitions.

The 2015–16 season saw Traoré continuing to recover from his injury, which saw him sidelined for the rest of the season and made no appearances for Queens Park Rangers. At the end of the 2015–16 season, he was released by the club.

=== Nottingham Forest ===
On 29 July 2016, Traoré signed a three-year deal with Championship side Nottingham Forest. Upon joining the club, he was given a number six shirt.

However, Traoré was not immediately fit to play, having missed the previous season through injury and having played his last match in April 2015. He made his Nottingham Forest debut, starting the whole game, in a 2–1 win against Doncaster Rovers in the first round of the League Cup. Shortly after, Traoré found himself in a competition with Danny Fox and Alex Iacovitti over the left–back position. Despite this, he made four starts in the first three months since joining the club. However, Traoré found himself sidelined on two separate occasions between November and March, including a knee injury that he sustained during a 1–1 draw against Preston North End on 14 December 2016. It wasn't until on 4 March 2017 when Traoré returned from injury, starting the whole game, in a 3–0 win against Brighton & Hove Albion. He then made four more starts for Nottingham Forest between 11 March 2017 and 14 April 2017. However, Traoré continued to be plagued by injuries on three occasions that saw him out for the rest of the 2016–17 season, as the club managed to avoid relegation. At the end of the 2016–17 season, he made thirteen appearances in all competitions.

Ahead of the 2017–18 season, Traoré said he was maintaining his fitness to fight for his place in the first team. Traoré started the season well when he helped Nottingham Forest keep a clean sheet in the opening game of the season, in a 1–0 win against Millwall. Since the start of the 2017–18 season, Traoré became a first team regular for the side, playing in the left–back position. He also played in the left–midfield position on two occasions. This lasted until Traoré suffered a hamstring injury during a match against Burton Albion on 21 October 2017 and was substituted as a result. After missing two matches, he returned to the starting line–up, in a 2–0 loss against Cardiff City on 26 November 2017. Following this, Traoré began to rotate in and out of the starting line–up for Nottingham Forest. On 7 January 2018, he won a penalty, converted by Kieran Dowell, in Forest's 4–2 FA Cup over his former employers Arsenal. By the time Traoré was loaned out, he made nineteen appearances in all competitions for the side.

On 2 February 2018, Traoré was loaned to Cardiff City until the end of the 2017–18 season. He made his Cardiff City's debut, starting a match against Leeds United on 3 February 2018 and set up the club's first goal of the game, in a 4–1 win. Traoré scored his first goal for Cardiff City in a 2–0 win against Bolton Wanderers on 13 February 2018. However, Traoré was plagued by injuries once again that affected most of the 2017–18 season at Cardiff City. At the end of the 2017–18 season, he made four appearances and scoring once in all competitions. Following this, Traoré returned to his parent club.

=== Çaykur Rizespor and Cardiff City ===
On 20 July 2018, Traoré joined Turkish Süper Lig side Çaykur Rizespor on a two-year contract with a one-year option. He made his Çaykur Rizespor debut, starting the whole game, in a 2–0 win against Tarsus İdman Yurdu in the third round of the Turkish Cup on 26 September 2018. On 15 January 2019, the club announced that they had tried to sell Traoré, but no offers had arrived, and neither was he able to find a new club. Çaykur Rizespor had to sell the player to abide by the rules on the number of foreign players registered in the team. He was then moved down to the U21 squad. He was ultimately released by the side after agreeing to leave the club by mutual consent. After leaving Çaykur Rizespor, Traoré spoken negatively about his time at the club, stating it made him look like a ‘fool’. This led the club to respond to his statement, denying his claim.

Following his release, Traoré returned to Cardiff City on a short-term contract, who released him on 7 January 2020 having not played a game.

In September 2020, Traoré was still without a club and considering retirement.

== International career ==
=== France ===
Traoré has represented France at under-17 and under-18 level. He played with the under-19s, helping them qualify for the elite round of the 2008 UEFA Under-19 Championship qualification. Traoré participated in all three qualifying matches and one of France's elite matches, before France were eliminated by Italy. He went on to make four appearances for the U19 side.

Traoré received his first call-up to the under-21 team on 13 November 2008 for their friendly against Denmark, as the match resulted in a 1–0 victory for the U21 side, with Traoré playing 73 minutes before being substituted off. He went on to make four appearances for France U21.

=== Senegal ===
In June 2011, Traoré opted to represent his nation of origin, Senegal, after discussions with their coach Amara Traoré. His father also played internationally for Senegal.

Traoré received his first Senegal call-up on 1 August ahead of a friendly match against Morocco. He made his debut for Senegal in a 2–0 defeat against Morocco on 10 August 2011, playing 70 minutes before being substituted off. Traoré was then called up as part of Senegal's squad for the 2012 African Cup of Nations. However, he made no appearances, as Senegal were eliminated in the Group Stage. In February 2013, Traoré was called up to Senegal for the first time in a year. He played his first match in almost two years, playing 45 minutes, in a 1–1 draw against Guinea on 5 February 2013. Traoré was called up to the Senegal national team for the first time in five years. He appeared in two matches for the national side, playing against Uzbekistan and Bosnia and Herzegovina.

== Personal life ==
Traoré grew up supporting Paris Saint-Germain and idolised Zinedine Zidane. In addition to speaking French, he speaks English since moving to England. Traoré revealed that his dad is friends with his former manager, Arsène Wenger. Traoré is married and has a son.

Traoré is a practising Muslim, and has been seen praying before a football match for Arsenal. In 2010, Traoré claimed he would remove all his tattoos surgically, also claiming his religion was behind the move after embracing the Muslim faith. He said:

I'm planning to do this in the summer. They'll put me under anaesthetic and then do it all, and when I wake up everything will be gone. It needs a bit of recovery time though so I'm not going to do it during the football season. If I had been into my religion properly before I'd had the tattoos done, I think I would never have got them. I think it's one of the biggest mistakes I've made in my life but I will try and correct it. My religion has benefits both personally and in my career. I have always been a Muslim but I wasn't really practising it, I was just saying to people 'I am a Muslim'. It's a gradual development."

== Career statistics ==
=== Club ===
Appearances and goals by club, season and competition
Club	Season	League			National cup		League cup		Europe		Other (Note: Includes Football League play-offs.)		Total	
Club	Season	Division	Apps	Goals	Apps	Goals	Apps	Goals	Apps	Goals	Apps	Goals	Apps	Goals
Arsenal	2006–07	Premier League	0	0	1	0	6	0	0	0	—		7	0
Arsenal	2007–08	Premier League	3	0	2	0	4	0	2	0	—		11	0
Arsenal	2008–09	Premier League	0	0	0	0	0	0	0	0	—		0	0
Arsenal	2009–10	Premier League	9	0	1	0	2	0	0	0	—		12	0
Arsenal	2010–11	Premier League	0	0	0	0	0	0	0	0	—		0	0
Arsenal	2011–12	Premier League	1	0	0	0	0	0	1	0	—		2	0
Arsenal	Total		13	0	4	0	12	0	3	0	—		32	0
Portsmouth (loan)	2008–09	Premier League	19	1	2	0	1	0	6	0	0	0	28	1
Juventus (loan)	2010–11	Serie A	10	0	0	0	—		2	0	—		12	0
Queens Park Rangers	2011–12	Premier League	23	0	0	0	0	0	—		—		23	0
Queens Park Rangers	2012–13	Premier League	26	0	1	0	1	0	—		—		28	0
Queens Park Rangers	2013–14	Championship	22	2	1	0	0	0	—		2	0	25	2
Queens Park Rangers	2014–15	Premier League	16	0	1	0	0	0	—		—		17	0
Queens Park Rangers	2015–16	Championship	0	0	0	0	0	0	—		—		0	0
Queens Park Rangers	Total		87	2	3	0	1	0	—		2	0	93	2
Nottingham Forest	2016–17	Championship	12	0	0	0	1	0	—		—		23	0
Nottingham Forest	2017–18	Championship	18	0	1	0	0	0	—		—		19	0
Nottingham Forest	Total		30	0	1	0	1	0	—		0	0	32	0
Cardiff City (loan)	2017–18	Championship	4	1	—		—		—		—		4	1
Çaykur Rizespor	2018–19	Süper Lig	0	0	1	0	—		—		—		1	0
Cardiff City	2019–20	Championship	0	0	0	0	0	0	—		—		0	0
Career total			163	4	11	0	15	0	11	0	2	0	202	4

=== International ===
As of 5 September 2015

National team	Year	Major competition			Friendlies		Total	
National team	Year	Tournament	Apps	Goals	Apps	Goals	Apps	Goals
France U19	2008	2008 UEFA U-19 Qualifier	4	0	0	0	4	0
France U21	2008–10	—	0	0	5	0	5	0
Senegal	2011	2012 Africa Cup of Nations Qualifier	1	0	1	0	2	0
Senegal	2012	2012 Africa Cup of Nations (Note: Player was part of the squad but has not played on any matches)	0	0	2	0	2	0
Senegal	2013	2014 WC Qualifiers	0	0	1	0	1	0
Senegal	Total		1	0	4	0	5	0

== Honours ==
Arsenal

- Football League Cup runner-up: 2006–07

Queens Park Rangers

- Football League Championship play-offs: 2014
