= Manchester City F.C. 3–2 Queens Park Rangers F.C. =

Manchester City v Queens Park Rangers
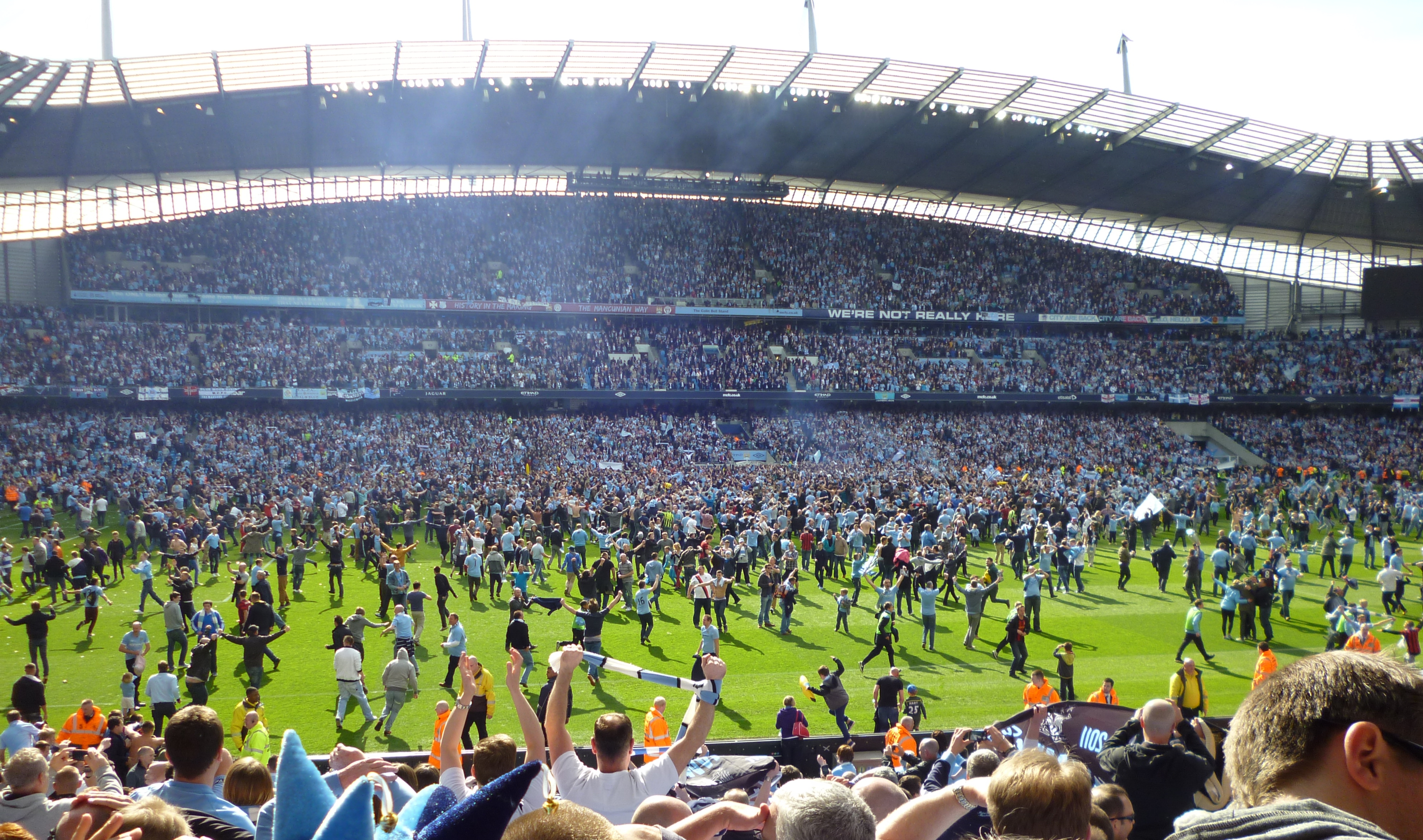
- Manchester City supporters storm the field following their first top flight title in 44 years
- Event: 2011–12 Premier League
Manchester City	Queens Park Rangers
3	2
- Date: 13 May 2012
- Venue: Etihad Stadium, Manchester
- Referee: Mike Dean
- Attendance: 48,000
- Weather: Clear

On 13 May 2012, Manchester City played Queens Park Rangers (QPR) at the Etihad Stadium in both teams' 38th and final match of the 2011–12 Premier League season. City entered the match in first place on goal difference, being level on 86 points with local rivals Manchester United, and needed to match or better United's result at Sunderland at the Stadium of Light to win the league. Meanwhile, QPR entered the match one spot above the relegation zone, knowing that a draw would secure safety at the expense of Bolton Wanderers. City won the match and the league title in dramatic fashion, reversing a 2–1 deficit by scoring two goals within 2 minutes and 5 seconds during stoppage time (1:15 to 3:20), with the winner being famously scored by Sergio Agüero 100 seconds from the final whistle, to clinch their first league title since the 1967–68 season, where they also pipped United on the final day. The win began a period of dominance in English football for City, with the club winning seven more Premier League titles over the subsequent 14 years.

The match, and more specifically, the final goal of the match, has repeatedly been described as the greatest moment in Premier League history. The terms "93:20" and "AGÜEROOOOOO!!!" have entered Manchester City folklore as a result, the former describing the exact second of the match at which point the final goal was scored, while the latter was Sky Sports commentator Martin Tyler's live response to the goal.

== Background ==
=== Manchester City ===
League position going into the final game of the season
Pos	Team	Pld	W	D	L	F	A	GD	Pts
1	Manchester City	37	27	5	5	90	27	63	86
2	Manchester United	37	27	5	5	88	33	55	86
3	Arsenal	37	20	7	10	71	47	24	67
4	Tottenham Hotspur	37	19	9	9	64	41	23	66
5	Newcastle United	37	19	8	10	55	48	7	65

Throughout their history, Manchester City and Manchester United had been continued rivals, with their sparring becoming particularly relevant during the 1960s and early 1970s when Manchester was known as 'The Capital of English Football, but while United entered a period of unprecedented success during the 1990s under the leadership of Alex Ferguson, City instead struggled and spent several seasons in the same period battling in the second and third divisions. Nonetheless, after a takeover by Mansour bin Zayed Al Nahyan of the Abu Dhabi royal family City's fortunes turned around, and over the course of several seasons they built a team capable of challenging for a title for the first time since the 1970s.

With the rivalry between the two clubs heating up once more, Ferguson, sensing the growing threat of City, provided a series of soundbites in response to press questions, describing City as "noisy neighbours" following a match between the two teams in 2009 which had finished 4–3 in United's favour, and dismissing their potential to challenge United's supremacy with the words "not in my lifetime". Going into the 2011–12 season, many pundits had continued to pick United as probable league winners, though the traditional gap between the two clubs was considered to have shrunk considerably after City had knocked United out in the semi-finals of the FA Cup on their way to winning their first trophy in 35 years plus qualifying for the Champions League for the first time in the Premier League era in the previous season. Both teams matched each other for results in the early rounds, but in the first Manchester derby of the season City caused a shock by beating United 6–1 at Old Trafford, equalling the record largest victory in a match between the two. After that match City took a 5-point lead at the top of the table, but occasional poor results led to United resuming first place in March.

Following this loss of place City's belief seemed to take a dip and their resulting bad form over the next four matches ended up with United leading the table by eight points with only six games each left to play. Having taken this lead, though, the two clubs seemed to trade form, with United suffering several poor results compared to City's straight victories, and a 1–0 home victory in the second derby of the season put the two clubs level on points going into May. Going into the final game of the season on 13 May, both teams were tied at the top of the table, with an identical record of 86 points, 27 games won, 5 drawn, 5 lost and all teams with 37 matches played. However, City were leading the table with a goal difference of eight goals better than United, meaning that City needed only to win, match United's result, or a United loss to win the league, with a victory likely to be enough to make sure of the result. City played at home against a Queens Park Rangers side still under threat of relegation, while United travelled to the Stadium of Light to play Sunderland, who were safe in mid-table and with no chance of European qualification remaining. Under the circumstances, both teams were expected to win their matches.

Adding to the atmosphere of the match for City was the fact that lining up for their opponents were several of their former players in Nedum Onuoha, Shaun Wright-Phillips and Joey Barton. QPR were also managed by Mark Hughes, who had been sacked by City two years previously.

=== Queens Park Rangers ===
League position going into the final game of the season
Pos	Team	Pld	W	D	L	F	A	GD	Pts
15	Wigan Athletic	37	10	10	17	39	60	−20	40
16	Aston Villa	37	7	17	13	37	51	−14	38
17	Queens Park Rangers	37	10	7	20	41	63	–22	37
18	Bolton Wanderers	37	10	5	22	44	75	−31	35
R	Blackburn Rovers	37	8	7	22	47	76	−29	31

In their early history Queens Park Rangers had been a traditional lower-league side, joining the Football League in 1920 and spending almost all of the next 50 years in the third tier. In the late 60s, however, the club experienced a change of fortune as they won back-to-back promotions to reach the Football League Division One – the predecessor to the Premier League – as well as triumphing in the 1967 Football League Cup Final to win their first major silverware. Though they were relegated in their first season at the top of the English football league system they returned again in 1983 and managed this time to stay for a total of 13 seasons, becoming Premier League founder members in the process.

After relegation in 1996 they again found themselves battling in the lower divisions, as well as fighting financial difficulties. The investment of billionaires Bernie Ecclestone, Flavio Briatore and Lakshmi Mittal in the late 2000s finally gave them firm financial footing, and by 2011 they were back in the Premier League.

Since their last stay in the Premier League, the financial implications of relegation had become much more severe, making relegation a fate to be avoided at all costs. In pre-season, QPR had been tipped to be relegated at the first time of asking by many pundits, and the club were taken over by Malaysian businessman Tony Fernandes in mid-August. A good run of results in the early months of the year put Rangers firmly mid-table but results tailed off in late 2011 and by the end of the year they were barely above the relegation zone leading to the sacking of manager Neil Warnock on 8 January 2012, being replaced by Mark Hughes who achieved his first victory two weeks later against fellow relegation candidates Wigan Athletic. Hughes would have to wait exactly two months for his second victory – a 3–2 win over Liverpool on 21 March – which sparked a run of five wins in nine games. QPR went into the final game of the season only two points above safety, knowing that they needed to take at least one point from their final match, or for rivals Bolton fail to win, in order to guarantee their survival.

== Match ==
=== Team selection ===
City had a full-strength squad to select from, with the only player missing through injury being Owen Hargreaves. QPR had been without both Kieron Dyer (foot) and Alejandro Faurlín (knee) since August, while Ákos Buzsáky (hamstring), Shaun Derry (thigh), Samba Diakité (illness), and Heidar Helguson (groin) were all doubts for Hughes' team.

=== Summary ===
==== First half ====
The game kicked off at 15:00 BST in front of a crowd of 48,000 at the Etihad Stadium in Manchester, in addition to a peak audience of more than three million viewers on Sky Sports. City started strongest, with Samir Nasri narrowly missing out on a tap-in in the 15th minute after Paddy Kenny recovered his own fumbled catch, and a minute later David Silva hit a low shot straight into Kenny's arms. City defender Pablo Zabaleta opened the scoring in the 39th minute; having failed to find Carlos Tevez with a low cross, Zabaleta chose instead to make his own run into the box. Quickly closed down by both Clint Hill and Taye Taiwo, Zabaleta opted for a shot on goal; QPR goalkeeper Kenny got both hands to it but could only palm the ball over his head and onto the far post, where it rebounded in to give Zabaleta his only goal of the season. In the buildup to the opening goal, City midfielder Yaya Touré picked up an injury and was replaced just before half-time by Nigel de Jong.

At the break, with City leading 1–0 and Bolton winning 2–1 against Stoke City, QPR were in a position to be relegated while City would win the title. Wayne Rooney's goal in the 20th minute of United's match against Sunderland meant that City needed to stay in the lead throughout the second half to be crowned champions.

==== Second half ====
QPR equalised three minutes into the second half when Djibril Cissé ran onto a miscontrolled defensive header by Joleon Lescott, entering the penalty area and shooting past Joe Hart at the first touch. Seven minutes later QPR were reduced to ten men when Joey Barton appeared to elbow Carlos Tevez off the ball and was shown a straight red card by referee Mike Dean. Walking away from Dean, Barton then walked up behind Sergio Agüero and kneed him in the back of the leg before attempting to headbutt Vincent Kompany in the ensuing melee. Needing to be escorted off the pitch by former teammate Micah Richards, Barton made a further attempt at starting a fight with Mario Balotelli before he could be sent down the tunnel.

Despite being a player down, QPR scored again in the 66th minute when a looped cross from Armand Traoré found Jamie Mackie unmarked to head in past Hart. City responded to the scoreline with a period of sustained attacking pressure. In the 72nd minute, Kenny tipped a Tevez header onto the bar from one corner before unconvincing defending for the second corner led to a shot by Zabaleta which ricocheted through the penalty area. In the 78th minute, Agüero salvaged a ball on the goal line to allow Edin Džeko a shot to the near corner which Kenny kept out with the toe of his boot. The following minute, Balotelli, a recent substitute coming on for Tevez, hit a powerful shot straight at Kenny. During a series of four corners in short succession, a diving save by Kenny was needed to stop Mario Balotelli header's from going in at the top corner.

At the end of regulation time, City still needed to score two more goals to win the league title. A 77th-minute equaliser for Stoke in their match against Bolton meant that QPR were heading closer to safety. Five minutes of injury time were added on to the end of the game, with City continuing to exert pressure. In the second of those minutes substitute Džeko equalised, powering a header past the goalkeeper from an in-swinging Silva corner – City's 18th of the match.

From the resulting kick-off Jay Bothroyd simply sent the ball out for a throw-in. QPR cleared the resulting attack, but after Rangers lost control of the ball in City's half, the ball was played straight to Agüero. By this point, the Sunderland–Manchester United game had ended 1–0 and Stoke–Bolton game had ended 2–2. As such, City needed to score another goal while QPR were safe, although they did not know that yet, while Manchester United have wrapped up their 1–0 win at Sunderland, a result that put Manchester United seconds away from winning the league for a 13th time. In the 94th minute, the Argentine passed to Balotelli, who was wrong-footed by a challenge by Anton Ferdinand and fell prone to the floor. With an outstretched leg, Balotelli still managed to flick the ball back into the path of Agüero, who sidestepped around a tackle by Taiwo before firing a powerful low shot to the corner of the goal hard at the near post past Kenny, winning the title for City, their first top flight title in 44 years. When the match was restarted, referee Mike Dean cautioned Agüero for taking off his shirt, while QPR – knowing that they were now safe from relegation – again hit the ball out for a throw-in and remained in their own half as Clichy and Hart passed the ball near their corner flag until Dean blew the final whistle just shortly after.

=== Details ===
13 May 2012
15:00

Manchester City	3–2	Queens Park Rangers
Zabaleta 39'; Džeko 90+2'; Agüero 90+4', (yellow card) 90+5'	Report	Cissé 48'; Mackie 66'; Barton (red card) 55'; Bothroyd (yellow card) 77'

City of Manchester Stadium, Manchester
Attendance: 48,000
Referee: Mike Dean (Cheshire)

Manchester City	Queens Park Rangers

GK	25	(England) Joe Hart
RB	5	(Argentina) Pablo Zabaleta
CB	4	(Belgium) Vincent Kompany (c)
CB	6	(England) Joleon Lescott
LB	22	(France) Gaël Clichy
RM	19	(France) Samir Nasri
CM	42	(Ivory Coast) Yaya Touré	(substituted off) 45'
CM	18	(England) Gareth Barry	(substituted off) 69'
LM	21	(Spain) David Silva
SS	32	(Argentina) Carlos Tevez	(substituted off) 76'
CF	16	(Argentina) Sergio Agüero
Substitutes:
GK	30	(Romania) Costel Pantilimon
DF	2	(England) Micah Richards
DF	13	(Serbia) Aleksandar Kolarov
MF	7	(England) James Milner
MF	34	(Netherlands) Nigel de Jong	(substituted on) 45'
FW	10	(Bosnia and Herzegovina) Edin Džeko	(substituted on) 69'
FW	45	(Italy) Mario Balotelli	(substituted on) 76'
Manager:
(Italy) Roberto Mancini

GK	1	(Republic of Ireland) Paddy Kenny
RB	42	(England) Nedum Onuoha
CB	35	(England) Anton Ferdinand
CB	3	(England) Clint Hill
LB	34	(Nigeria) Taye Taiwo
RM	12	(Scotland) Jamie Mackie
CM	4	(England) Shaun Derry
CM	17	(England) Joey Barton (c)
LM	32	(England) Shaun Wright-Phillips
CF	23	(France) Djibril Cissé		(substituted off) 59'
CF	52	(England) Bobby Zamora		(substituted off) 76'
Substitutes:
GK	24	(Czech Republic) Radek Černý
DF	6	(Wales) Danny Gabbidon
DF	13	(Senegal) Armand Traoré		(substituted on) 59'
MF	7	(Morocco) Adel Taarabt
MF	14	(Hungary) Ákos Buzsáky
FW	9	(England) DJ Campbell
FW	10	(England) Jay Bothroyd	(substituted on) 76'
Manager:
(Wales) Mark Hughes

Man of the Match:

- Sergio Agüero (Manchester City)

Match rules

- 90 minutes
- No extra time or penalties
- Seven named substitutes, of which up to three may be used

=== Statistics ===
Statistic	Manchester City	Queens Park Rangers
Goals scored	3	2
Possession	81.3%	18.7%
Shots on target	15	3
Shots off target	10	0
Blocked shots	19	0
Corner kicks	19	0
Fouls	4	7
Tackles	15	22
Offsides	1	1
Yellow cards	1	1
Red cards	0	1
Source: Sky Sports

== Aftermath ==
League position at the end of the 2011–12 season
Pos	Team	Pld	W	D	L	GF	GA	GD	Pts
C	Manchester City	38	28	5	5	93	29	64	89
2	Manchester United	38	28	5	5	89	33	56	89
3	Arsenal	38	21	7	10	74	49	25	70
4	Tottenham Hotspur	38	20	9	9	66	41	25	69
5	Newcastle United	38	19	8	11	56	51	5	65

=== Manchester City ===
The win sealed Manchester City's first league title since the 1967–68 season and their first Premier League trophy; additionally they became the first, and currently only, club to win the Premier League on goal difference alone. When the final whistle was blown, the City fans responded with a pitch invasion. Phil Foden, then 11 years old, was among the fans who entered the playing field to celebrate: he would make his debut for the club five and a half years later.

The media immediately lauded the match as a historic moment: The New York Times described it as "the most dramatic and improbable end to the English season anyone could remember" and the BBC claimed it to be "a truly remarkable piece of football theatre and the most dramatic conclusion to a season in Premier League history", while Bleacher Report labelled it as "the perfect way to end what many believe has been the greatest Premier League season ever". In the post-match interviews, City manager Roberto Mancini commented that "I have never ever seen anything like this. Never. It's incredible, I don't know what to say." Captain Vincent Kompany referred to the drama of the victory with: "You want to say it's the personal moment of your life but if I'm honest, please never again this way."

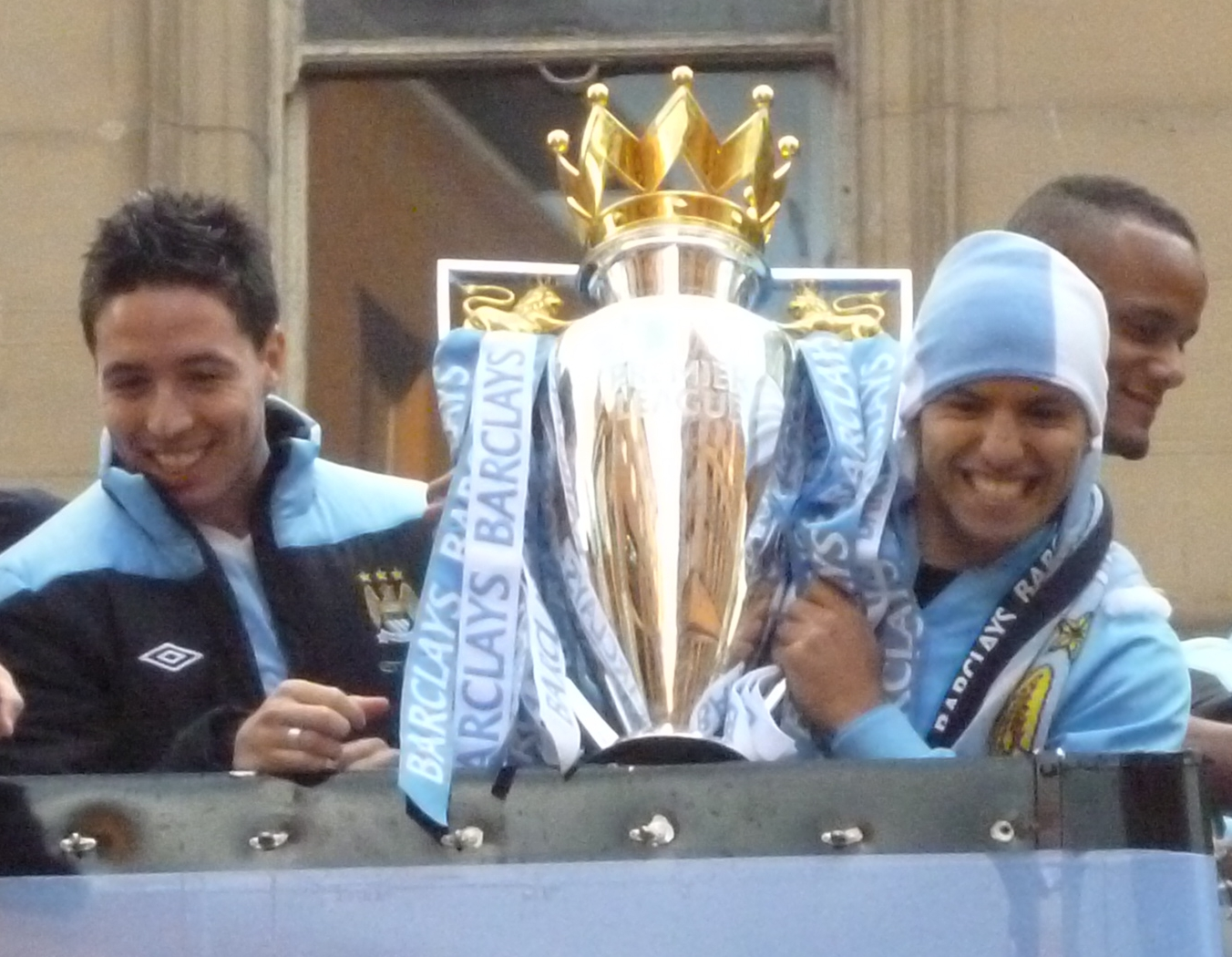
Samir Nasri and Sergio Agüero parade the Premier League trophy, May 2012

Going into the 2012–13 season, Manchester City's triumph in the previous season was enough to convince many pundits, previously sceptical of the idea that City were ready to be champions, that the Sky Blues would be capable of immediately defending the title. However, City ultimately finished runners-up to United, trailing by an eleven-point gap. To add insult to injury, despite the club reaching the FA Cup final for the second time in three years, they surprisingly lost 1–0 to Wigan Athletic, who got relegated from the Premier League three days later, leading to Roberto Mancini's sacking two days after the defeat.

After reclaiming the Premier League title, Manchester United manager Alex Ferguson announced his retirement following 26 years in charge at Old Trafford. Without Ferguson, United immediately struggled, finishing the 2013–14 season in seventh place and failing to qualify for European football for the first time in 25 years. The poor season, which saw Ferguson's own nominated successor, David Moyes, sacked after less than one year in the job, would ultimately prove to only be the start of a prolonged period of little success, with commentators almost a decade later continuing to attempt to provide narrative or explanations for their shortcomings.

With the long-standing threat of their closest rival dowsed, the path to sustained success was opened to City. New manager Manuel Pellegrini won the Premier League in his first season in charge, and though his next two seasons were less successful, the introduction of his successor, Pep Guardiola, would reinvigorate the club. By the end of the 2020–21 season, City had won five league titles in ten seasons and finished second three times, never finishing outside of the top four, with City frequently described as the new dominant team of English football. Asked to look back on the previous decade for City at an event to mark the unveiling of a statue of Sergio Agüero in 2022, club Chairman Khaldoon Al Mubarak commented "It's the moment that changed everything. If you look at the 10 years since, that was the moment that introduced what lies ahead."

==== "That Agüero goal" ====
"In my career so far it's the most important goal. You score the goal in the last minute to win the title. You're not sure if that's ever going to happen in your career again. I wish I could tell you how I did it but I can't. I thought for all the world that Mario [Balotelli] was going to have a go himself but he just moved it on one more and it fell at my feet and I just thought: 'Hit the target, hit it as hard as you can and hit the target.' And it went in."

— Sergio Agüero, on his last-minute goal against Queens Park Rangers in which won the Premier League for City and their first top flight title in 44 years, their last title being in the 1967–68 season.

Amongst City fans, the goal as well as the wider event of the title win was given the moniker "93:20" – referring to the exact time in minutes and seconds which the goal was scored. The moniker became sufficiently synonymous that the club themselves would adopt it on frequent occasions. In 2015 the club would renovate part of the stadium, installing a hospitality suite bar simply called "93:20" – the club would come to refer to the hospitality section as the "93:20" seats in some media. In 2017 the club produced a mini-documentary entitled simply "93:20" and then five years later released a second documentary to celebrate the ten-year anniversary of the goal, this time naming it "93:20 | The Ultimate Premier League Finale".

In 2021, City's home kit paid tribute to the late winning goal, with the body of the traditional sky blue shirt actually formed of a repeating sublimated pattern of fourteen-segment displays referencing the idea of a digital clock, with the time 93:20 printed on the inside neck of the shirt. At the end of the same season, the club then produced a second commemorative shirt, this time designed as a pre-match jersey. It featured frame-by-frame footage of Agüero's goal imprinted on white and blue hoops and the name "Agüeroooo" printed on the back, with the name and number again in segmented display style. The shirt was given the official name 93:20 ULTRA 1.4. A statue of Agüero was also unveiled on the 10th anniversary of the goal, with the pose capturing the moment he ran down the sidelines immediately after scoring, swinging his shirt around his head in celebration.

"It's finished at Sunderland. Manchester United have done all they can; that Rooney goal was enough for the three points. Manchester City are still alive here. Balotelli… Agüeroooo! I swear you'll never see anything like this ever again! So watch it, drink it in. They've just heard the news at the Stadium of Light. Two goals in added time for Manchester City to snatch the title away from Manchester United. Stupendous!"

— Martin Tyler's commentary of Agüero's goal.

Sky Sports commentator Martin Tyler also made history with his commentary of Agüero's goal as it went in. The combination of the drama of the event and Tyler's incredulous comments as he watched it unfold immediately caught the public attention and gained a lasting reputation. His narration of the goal is considered by many as one of the most memorable commentaries in the history of the sport – in 2017, it was ranked by The Independent journalist Miguel Delaney as the most significant moment in Premier League history. Several quotes from Tyler's commentary themselves entered the folklore of the event. By shouting Agüero's name – sustained for several seconds – the goal gained another nickname as "Aguerooooo". His words "So watch it, drink it in" would go on a decade later to inspire the name of a Sky Sports documentary on City's rise, while in 2020 fellow commentator Clive Tyldesley, when interviewed about Tyler's role in the legacy of the game and the goal, remarked "When Martin Tyler shouts: 'Aguero', that's not the great bit; the great bit is: 'I swear you'll never see anything like this ever again.' That's a big call for a commentator to make, but actually, editorially, it stands up. It was correct, and that's what you do – you’ve got to come up with something that stands the test of time."

=== Queens Park Rangers ===
League position at the end of the 2011–12 season
Pos	Team	Pld	W	D	L	GF	GA	GD	Pts
15	Wigan Athletic	38	11	10	17	42	62	−20	43
16	Aston Villa	38	7	17	14	37	53	−16	38
17	Queens Park Rangers	38	10	7	21	43	66	−23	37
R	Bolton Wanderers	38	10	6	22	46	77	−31	36
R	Blackburn Rovers	38	8	7	23	48	78	−30	31

Despite their loss, QPR escaped relegation after Bolton only drew 2–2 against Stoke, unable to overtake them. Following the match with City, manager Mark Hughes promised that the following season would not see another relegation battle. QPR invested heavily in their squad over the summer, bringing in a dozen new players. Regardless, QPR started the 2012–13 season poorly and Hughes was sacked on 23 November 2012 after failing to win any of the club's first twelve league matches. He was replaced by Harry Redknapp the following day.

QPR's winless run ended with a 2–1 victory over Fulham in the West London derby on 15 December 2012. In the January transfer window, the club again brought in a number of new signings, breaking their transfer record twice in the space of a fortnight, but after winning only four league games all season QPR were relegated to the Championship, finishing the season 14 points from safety. QPR were promoted to the Premier League again in 2013–14, qualifying on 25 May 2014 after a playoff final victory over Derby County but lasted only one further season, being relegated on 10 May 2015 after a 6–0 loss to City, and have stayed in the Championship since then.

==== Joey Barton ====
In the hours after the match, Joey Barton sent a series of tweets apologising to his club's fans but admitting that he had continued attacking players in the hopes of seeing City players sent off too. On 23 May, Barton was charged with two separate counts of violent conduct by the FA. He was given a four-match ban for the incident with Tevez, and an additional eight-game ban for the further actions he took as he was leaving the pitch, as well as a £75,000 fine. The total 12 game was the longest suspension handed out in the Premier League's history. Two days later, QPR stripped him of the club captaincy and fined him six weeks of wages. In the following weeks he would also be left off his club's pre-season tour, and he was not given a squad number for the following season.

On 31 August, Barton completed a season-long loan move to Ligue 1 club Marseille, believing that the move to France would allow him to serve his suspension from English football while still getting match time. On 7 September, the LFP announced that his 12-match ban would also apply for French matches, leaving him only able to take part in Europa League matches until it had elapsed. Barton ultimately made his domestic debut on 25 November, in a 1–0 home win against Lille. Although Barton initially claimed that he had no intention of returning to QPR, he returned to his parent club for the 2013–14 season. He played with them for two more seasons before leaving in 2015.

== See also ==
- 2011–12 Premier League
- 2011–12 Manchester City F.C. season
- 2011–12 Queens Park Rangers F.C. season
