= 2014 Football League Championship play-off final =

Association football match in London

- The match was played at Wembley Stadium.
- Event: 2013–14 Football League Championship
Derby County	Queens Park Rangers
0	1
- Date: 24 May 2014
- Venue: Wembley Stadium, London
- Man of the Match: Richard Dunne
- Referee: Lee Mason
- Attendance: 87,348
- Weather: Rainy

The 2014 Football League Championship play-off final was an association football match which was played on 24 May 2014 at Wembley Stadium, London, between Derby County and Queens Park Rangers. The match was to determine the third and final team to gain promotion from the EFL Championship, the second tier of English football, to the Premier League. The top two teams of the 2013–14 Football League Championship season gained automatic promotion to the Premier League, while the teams placed from third to sixth place in the table partook in play-off semi-finals; Derby County ended the season in third place while Queens Park Rangers finished fourth. The winners of these semi-finals competed for the final place for the 2014–15 season in the Premier League. Winning the game was estimated to be worth up to £120 million to the successful team.

The 2014 final, refereed by Lee Mason, was watched by a crowd of more than 87,000 people in rainy conditions. Queens Park Rangers won 1–0, with the only goal of the game coming from Bobby Zamora in the last minute of the game. It was QPR's first appearance in a second tier play-off final, although they had lost in the League One playoffs to Cardiff City in the 2003 final.

Queens Park Rangers were relegated back to the Championship the following season, as they finished bottom of the Premier League. Derby finished the following season in eighth place in the Championship, missing out on play-offs by a single point.

== Route to the final ==
Football League Championship final table, leading positions
Pos	Team	Pld	W	D	L	GF	GA	GD	Pts
1	Leicester City	46	31	9	6	83	43	+40	102
2	Burnley	46	26	15	5	72	37	+35	93
3	Derby County	46	25	10	11	84	52	+32	85
4	Queens Park Rangers	46	23	11	12	60	44	+16	80
5	Wigan Athletic	46	21	10	15	61	48	+13	73
6	Brighton & Hove Albion	46	19	15	12	55	40	+15	72

Derby County finished the regular 2013–14 season in third place in the Football League Championship, the second tier of the English football league system, one place ahead of Queens Park Rangers (QPR). Both therefore missed out on the two automatic places for promotion to the Premier League and instead took part in the play-offs to determine the third promoted team. Derby finished eight points behind Burnley (who were promoted in second place) and seventeen behind league winners Leicester City. QPR ended the season five points behind Derby.

Queens Park Rangers faced Wigan Athletic in their play-off semi-final, with the first leg taking place at the DW Stadium. Wigan were without their top scorer Nick Powell who was suffering from tonsillitis. It was a game with few chances and neither team really dominated: it ended goalless. The second leg was held at Loftus Road three days later. Wigan took the lead with an early goal from James Perch before Charlie Austin equalised from the penalty spot in the 73rd minute after Gary Caldwell fouled Junior Hoilett in the Wigan area. No further goals were scored in regular time so the game went into extra time. Austin scored his second and the winner in the 96th minute when his shot beat Scott Carson.

In the other play-off semi-final, Derby County's opponents were Brighton & Hove Albion, against whom they played the first leg at the Falmer Stadium. The home team took the lead after 18 minutes through Jesse Lingard but Derby equalised with a Chris Martin penalty awarded after Matthew Upson fouled Craig Forsyth. The winning goal for the visitors came in first-half injury time when Martin's shot rebounded off the bar, striking Brighton goalkeeper Tomasz Kuszczak on the back before crossing the line for an own goal. In the return leg at Pride Park, Will Hughes scored Derby's first goal from a Jamie Ward cross and Martin doubled the lead early in the second half. A George Thorne volley made it 3–0 to the home side and Jeff Hendrick extended the lead from a Patrick Bamford pass, and although Brighton scored a consolation through Kazenga LuaLua, the match ended 4–1, and Derby progressed to the play-off final as 6–2 aggregate winners.

Derby County			Round	Queens Park Rangers
Opponent	Result	Legs	Semi-finals	Opponent	Result	Legs
Brighton & Hove Albion	6–2	2–1 away; 4–1 home		Wigan Athletic	2–1	0–0 home; 2–1 (a.e.t.) away

== Match ==
=== Background ===
This was Derby's third Championship play-off final, having lost 2–1 against Leicester City in the 1994 final at the old Wembley Stadium, and winning 1–0 against West Bromwich Albion in the 2007 final. Queens Park Rangers were making their first appearance in a second tier play-off final, although they had played in the League One playoffs, losing out to Cardiff City in the 2003 final in extra time. During the regular season, both teams had won their home games against one another. In November 2013, QPR won 2–1 at Loftus Road while Derby won the contest at Pride Park the following February. QPR's top scorer for the season was Austin, with 20 goals, while Martin scored more than any other player for Derby, also with 20. Derby midfielder Hughes had recently been named as the Football League Young Player of the Year at the Football League Awards.

Derby County fans were located in the West End of Wembley, with an allocation of 37,249, while QPR supporters were situated in the East End, with an allocation of 37,332. The final was refereed by Lee Mason, with assistant referees Darren England and John Brooks, while Jonathan Moss acted as fourth official. It was reported in the media and press that the match was worth up to £120 million to the winning club over three years through sponsorship and television deals.

QPR's Benoît Assou-Ekotto was expected to be fit for the final having missed both semi-finals with a knee injury, and although Niko Kranjčar picked up a hamstring injury in the second leg of their semi-final, he was also available. The club's long-term injuries included Alejandro Faurlín, Jermaine Jenas and Matt Phillips. Derby's Craig Bryson was back in full training after a semi-final back injury, otherwise their squad was fully fit. Kranjčar was named in QPR's starting line-up but Assou-Ekotto missed out, while Derby's Bryson was on the bench.

=== First half ===
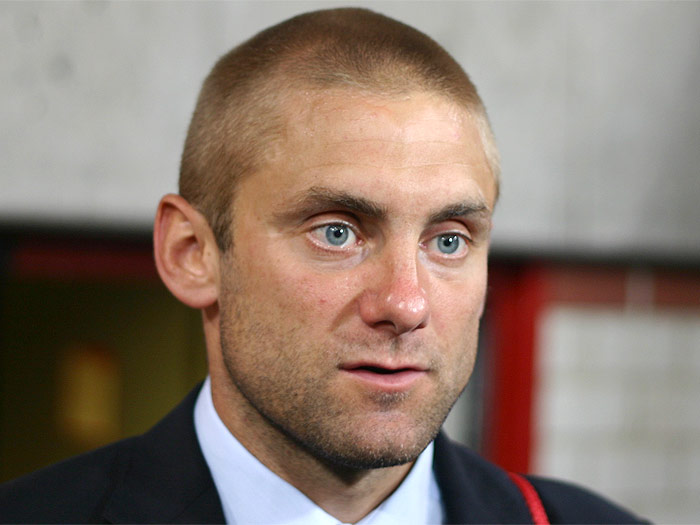
Robert Green (pictured in 2010) made a number of important saves for QPR.

Derby kicked the match off at around 3 p.m. in wet conditions in front of a crowd of 87,348. In the fourth minute, Derby's Johnny Russell beat two QPR players and passed to Hughes who was fouled by Gary O'Neil. The resulting free kick was defended by the QPR wall. Two minutes later QPR won a corner, which was cleared by Thorne away from Richard Dunne before Derby's Austin struck over the bar at the other end. In the 15th minute, Richard Keogh brought Austin down but Joey Barton's free kick came to nothing. Subsequent shots from Kevin Doyle and Barton were both unsuccessful and on 24 minutes, Ward's cross was headed over by Forsyth. Three minutes later Derby's appeal for a penalty after Hughes went down in the QPR box was dismissed by the referee Mason. In the 29th minute another shot from Ward, this time from 25 yards, was deflected for a corner which was cleared by QPR. The first substitution of the game was forced upon the London club with Kranjčar suffering a hamstring injury. He was replaced in the 33rd minute by Armand Traoré after Hughes' shot for Derby went over the bar. Robert Green made his first save of the afternoon, pushing Ward's curling direct free kick around the post, going on to catch Hughes' subsequent corner. After one minute of injury time, the referee brought the half to a close with the score at 0–0.

=== Second half ===
Queens Park Rangers started the second half and in the 51st minute, a Ward pass was put out for a corner by Dunne which was subsequently cleared by Danny Simpson. Two further corners followed but with no end product, as the game remained goalless. In the 57th minute, Doyle passed to Traore whose pull back found Austin who struck the ball wide of the post from 12 yards. It was Doyle's last involvement as he was then replaced by Bobby Zamora in QPR's second substitution of the afternoon. In the 60th minute, O'Neil was shown a red card for fouling Russell as he was about to shoot. Soon after, to bolster the QPR midfield, Clint Hill was replaced by Karl Henry. Derby made their first substitutions of the game, with Bryson on for Hughes and Simon Dawkins replacing Russell. Two minutes later Bryson forced Green to make a low save, then Martin's shot from a Bryson pass needed the QPR goalkeeper to make a reaction save from the corner of the six-yard box. Hendrick drew another save from Green in the 75th minute, the rebound from Ward being blocked by teammate Martin. Another Hendrick shot in the 87th minute went straight to Green and in the last minute of regular time, QPR's Zamora curled a shot past Grant to make the score 1–0. Three minutes of injury were indicated, and in the last of those, Bamford came on for Ward and his attempted overhead kick was deflected behind by Barton. Derby goalkeeper Grant came up for the corner which was kicked out for a throw by Keogh, and a minute later the final whistle was blown, QPR winning the match 1–0.

=== Details ===
24 May 2014
15:00 BST

Derby County	0–1	Queens Park Rangers
	Report	Zamora 90'

Wembley Stadium, London
Attendance: 87,348
Referee: Lee Mason (Lancashire)

Derby County	Queens Park Rangers

GK	1	(England) Lee Grant
RB	33	(England) Andre Wisdom
CB	6	(Republic of Ireland) Richard Keogh (c)
CB	25	(England) Jake Buxton
LB	3	(Scotland) Craig Forsyth
RM	8	(Republic of Ireland) Jeff Hendrick
CM	34	(England) George Thorne
LM	19	(England) Will Hughes	(substituted off) 68'
RF	11	(Scotland) Johnny Russell	(substituted off) 67'
CF	9	(Scotland) Chris Martin
LF	10	(Northern Ireland) Jamie Ward	(substituted off) 90+2'
Substitutes:
GK	26	(England) Adam Legzdins
DF	27	(United States) Zak Whitbread
MF	4	(Scotland) Craig Bryson	(substituted on) 68'
MF	14	(England) John Eustace
FW	18	(Republic of Ireland) Conor Sammon
FW	32	(Jamaica) Simon Dawkins	(substituted on) 67'
FW	35	(England) Patrick Bamford	(substituted on) 90+2'
Manager:
(England) Steve McClaren

GK	1	(England) Robert Green
RB	2	(England) Danny Simpson
CB	15	(England) Nedum Onuoha
CB	5	(Republic of Ireland) Richard Dunne
LB	6	(England) Clint Hill (c)		(substituted off) 67'
RM	19	(Croatia) Niko Kranjčar		(substituted off) 33'
CM	17	(England) Joey Barton
CM	36	(England) Gary O'Neil	(red card) 60'
LM	23	(Canada) Junior Hoilett
CF	9	(England) Charlie Austin
CF	14	(Republic of Ireland) Kevin Doyle		(substituted off) 57'
Substitutes:
GK	26	(Republic of Ireland) Brian Murphy
DF	3	(Senegal) Armand Traoré		(substituted on) 33'
DF	13	(South Korea) Yun Suk-young
DF	18	(Northern Ireland) Aaron Hughes
MF	4	(England) Ravel Morrison
MF	20	(England) Karl Henry		(substituted on) 67'
FW	25	(England) Bobby Zamora	(yellow card) 90+1'	(substituted on) 57'
Manager:
(England) Harry Redknapp

Man of the Match: Richard Dunne

Assistant referees:
Darren England
John Brooks
Fourth official:
Jonathan Moss

Match rules:

- 90 minutes.
- 30 minutes of extra time if necessary.
- Penalty shoot-out if scores still level.
- Seven named substitutes.
- Maximum of three substitutions.

=== Statistics ===
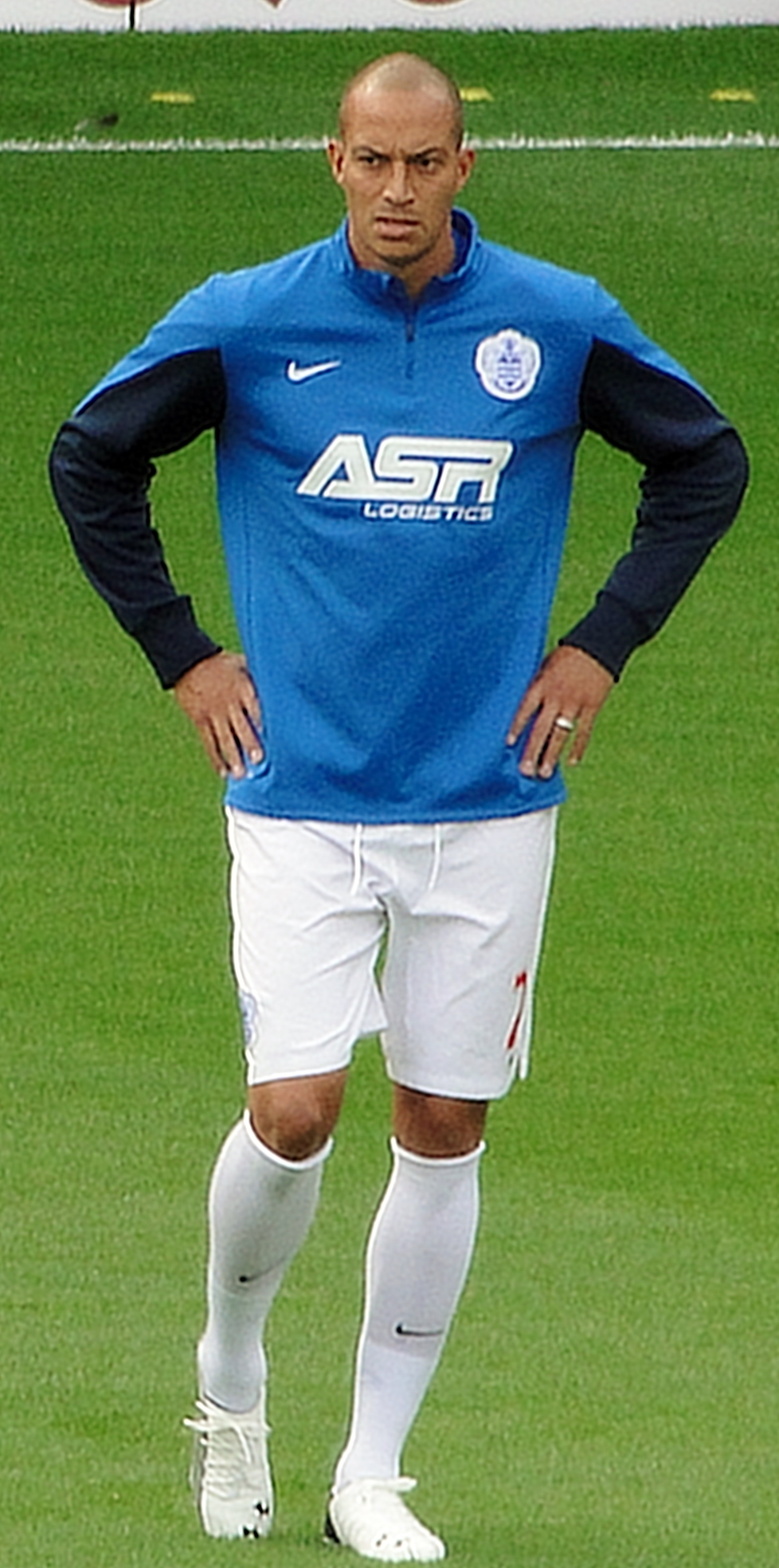
Bobby Zamora scored the only goal of the game.

Statistics
	Derby County	Queens Park Rangers
Goals	0	1
Total shots	16	11
Shots on target	5	1
Ball possession	68%	32%
Corner kicks	14	1
Fouls committed	11	10
Yellow cards	0	1
Red cards	0	1

== Post-match ==
The Derby manager Steve McClaren said "it was the cruellest game ever ... I've lost some games in my career but that is the cruellest." His counterpart, Harry Redknapp, remarked "it was an amazing finish to the game. We were hanging on really and looking to get to extra time ... And then Bobby sticks one in the top corner." The QPR midfielder Barton was gracious in victory, noting "I feel sorry for Derby, they played fantastic today and they deserved to win." The QPR defender Richard Dunne was named as man of the match.

QPR ended the following season at the foot of the Premier League table, eight points from safety and were relegated back to the Championship for the 2015–16 season. Derby finished the next season in eighth place, missing out on the 2015 Football League play-offs by a single point.
