= 2011–12 Premier League =

Football season in England

Premier League
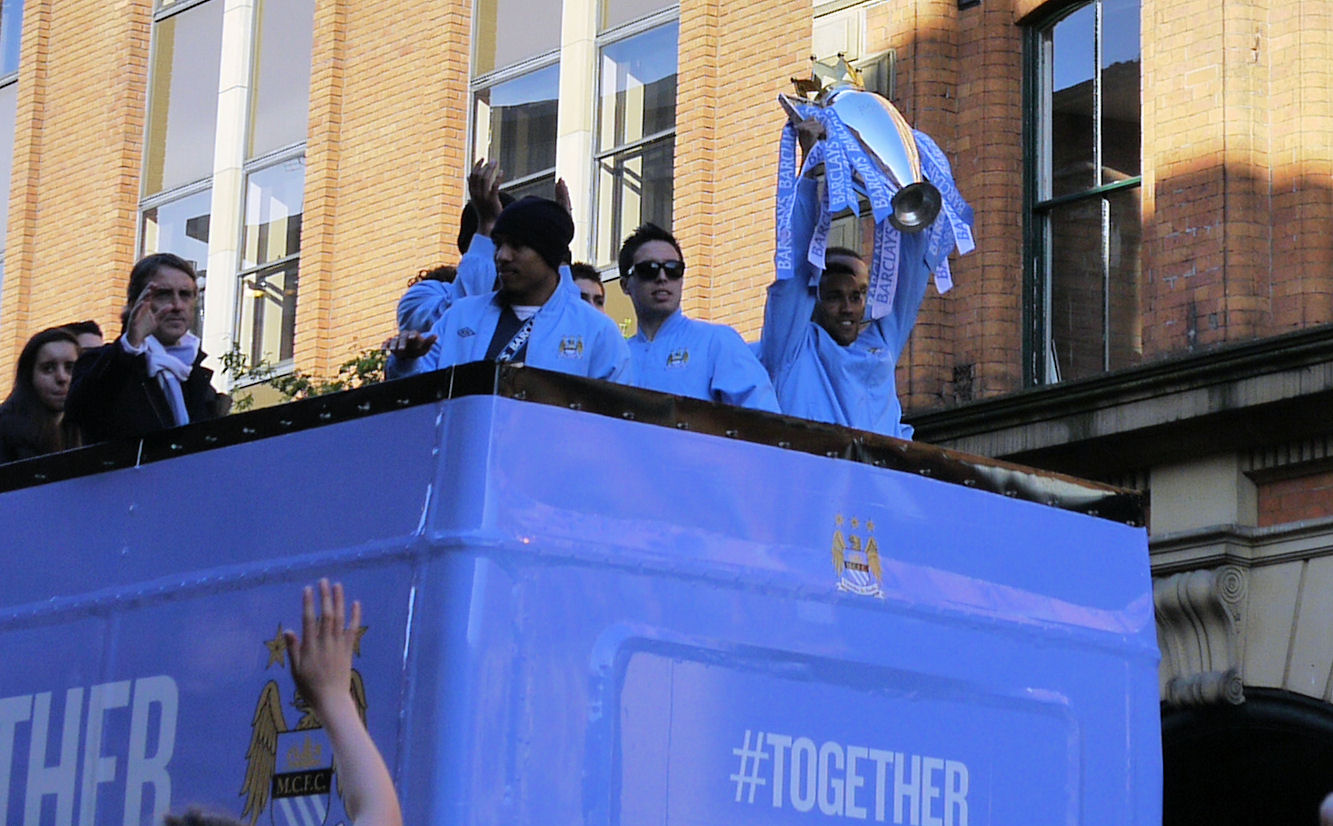
- Season: 2011–12
- Dates: 13 August 2011 – 13 May 2012
- Champions: Manchester City; 1st Premier League title 3rd English title
- Relegated: Bolton Wanderers; Blackburn Rovers; Wolverhampton Wanderers
- Champions League: Manchester City; Manchester United; Arsenal; Chelsea (as Champions League winners)
- Europa League: Tottenham Hotspur; Newcastle United; Liverpool
- Matches: 380
- Goals: 1,066 (2.81 per match)
- Top goalscorer: Robin van Persie (30 goals)
- Best goalkeeper: Joe Hart (17 clean sheets)
- Biggest home win: Manchester United 8–2 Arsenal (28 August 2011); Fulham 6–0 Queens Park Rangers (2 October 2011); Arsenal 7–1 Blackburn Rovers (4 February 2012)
- Biggest away win: Bolton Wanderers 0–5 Manchester United (10 September 2011); Manchester United 1–6 Manchester City (23 October 2011); Fulham 0–5 Manchester United (21 December 2011); Wolverhampton Wanderers 0–5; Manchester United (18 March 2012); Norwich City 1–6 Manchester City (14 April 2012)
- Highest scoring: Manchester United 8–2 Arsenal (28 August 2011)
- Longest winning run: 8 games Manchester United
- Longest unbeaten run: 14 games Manchester City
- Longest winless run: 12 games Wolverhampton Wanderers
- Longest losing run: 8 games Wigan Athletic
- Highest attendance: 75,627; Manchester United 4–1; Wolverhampton Wanderers (10 December 2011)
- Lowest attendance: 15,195; Queens Park Rangers 0–4; Bolton Wanderers (13 August 2011)
- Total attendance: 13,148,465
- Average attendance: 34,601

The 2011–12 Premier League (known as the Barclays Premier League for sponsorship reasons) was the 20th season of the Premier League since its establishment in 1992. The season began on 13 August 2011 and ended on 13 May 2012, with Manchester City sealing the club's third league title – its first since 1968 – by beating Queens Park Rangers 3–2 on the last day. The title was City's first Premier League success, making it the fifth club to win the Premier League in its 20-year history. The City team finished level on 89 points with Manchester United, but they had a superior goal difference to their local rivals, making it the first and (to date) only time the Premier League had been won on goal difference.

The league was contested by 20 teams, 17 returning from the 2010–11 season and three promoted from the Football League Championship. Championship winners Queens Park Rangers and runners-up Norwich City gained automatic promotion, while Swansea City gained promotion through the Football League Championship play-offs by beating Reading 4–2 in May 2011, becoming the first non-English team to play in the Premier League. All three promoted clubs avoided relegation for the first time since the 2001–02 campaign. The season was voted as the greatest Premier League season in the Premier League 20 Seasons Awards.

An independent commission later found that Manchester City breached Premier League financial rules during this season, part of a pattern of breaches spanning 2009-2018.

== Season summary ==
Manchester City won the title in a tense finale, the club's first championship since 1968. City's local rivals Manchester United were the early pace-setters, leading the table until October, when they drew at Liverpool, allowing Manchester City to overtake them. The following week, City increased their lead to five points with a shock 6–1 away victory at Old Trafford, which they maintained until December, when they dropped points and their lead narrowed, but City remained in front until March, when a defeat at Swansea City saw them drop behind United. City's bad form continued for the next month while United went on a winning run, so that with six matches remaining United were eight points ahead of City and the title seemingly decided. However, United then faltered with a defeat and a draw in their next three games, while City won all three to narrow the gap to three points. City then beat United 1–0 at the City of Manchester Stadium to move back ahead of United on goal difference. Both sides won their penultimate matches to maintain the status quo.

Going into the final matches, which were played simultaneously, City were top of the league, ahead of Manchester United on goal difference, while level on 86 points. However, a Wayne Rooney goal away to Sunderland gave United the advantage. A 39th-minute goal from Pablo Zabaleta, his first of the season, put City back on top at half-time. In a dramatic second half, Djibril Cissé equalised for Queens Park Rangers in the 48th minute. Shortly afterward Joey Barton of QPR was sent off for elbowing Carlos Tevez; on his way off the pitch, he kicked Sergio Agüero, attempted to headbutt Vincent Kompany and squared up to Mario Balotelli. Despite the numerical advantage, City went behind after Jamie Mackie gave QPR the lead in the 66th minute. As time wound down in both matches, it appeared that Manchester United would win the title with their victory over Sunderland. But Edin Džeko equalised for City in the 92nd minute. While United players waited on the field at Sunderland for a possible trophy presentation, Manchester City's Sergio Agüero scored the title clincher in the 94th minute to win the league for City and became the only team to win the Premier League on goal difference. The 6–1 result was even more important than it seemed at the time because if the score had been 2–1, then both teams would have ended with identical records (W D L GF GA GD Pts) which by Premier League rules would have meant a play-off game at a neutral ground to decide the title.

For most of the season, Tottenham Hotspur were in third place, a couple of points behind the Manchester clubs, and there was much speculation as to whether Tottenham could mount a title challenge. However, from late February onward their season collapsed, starting with a 5–2 defeat to local rivals Arsenal, whom they had been 10 points ahead of before the game, and just four wins in their last 13 games condemned Tottenham to finishing a point below Arsenal, who finished third to join Manchester City and Manchester United in the UEFA Champions League, Arsenal completed a strong recovery from a disastrous start to the season including their 8–2 defeat at Manchester United in August. Tottenham finished in fourth but missed out on qualification for the Champions League because Chelsea's victory in the 2012 Champions League final automatically entitled them to defend their title in the 2012–13 tournament at the expense of the lowest-ranked team that would otherwise qualify for the competition through league position. This was the first time that this rule had been implemented in the Premier League, having been introduced by UEFA after Liverpool's controversial qualification for the 2005–06 UEFA Champions League. This consequently marked the first time that the club finishing fourth in the Premier League had not qualified for the tournament since the fourth qualifying spot was introduced in the 2001–02 season. Newcastle United finished fifth and qualified for the 2012–13 UEFA Europa League. Everton finished seventh, just above local rivals Liverpool. Despite finishing above them for the first time in seven years, it was Liverpool who claimed the final Europa League slot, by virtue of winning the 2011–12 Football League Cup.

At the bottom of the league, Wolverhampton Wanderers were the first to be relegated on 22 April, following a 2–0 loss to eventual champions Manchester City. Blackburn Rovers would soon follow on 7 May after a 1–0 loss to Wigan Athletic. On the final day of the season, Bolton Wanderers needed a win against Stoke City, and for QPR to lose to guarantee their survival. However, they failed to beat Stoke, drawing 2–2, and were relegated, with QPR avoiding the drop, despite losing to Manchester City. For the second time in the Premier League's history, none of the three clubs promoted from the Championship in the previous season were relegated at the end of the season with the other two teams, Swansea City and Norwich City, finishing 11th and 12th respectively. The last time all three newly promoted teams stayed up (2001–02), Blackburn and Bolton were two of those teams.

Liverpool's Luis Suárez was found guilty of racially abusing Manchester United's Patrice Evra and was given an eight-match ban.

== Teams ==
Twenty teams competed in the league – the top seventeen teams from the previous season and the three teams promoted from the Championship. The promoted teams were Queens Park Rangers, Norwich City and Swansea City, returning to the top flight after absences of fifteen, six and twenty-eight years respectively. This was also Swansea City's first season in the Premier League. This was the first season where a Welsh team competed in the top flight of English football since the 1982–83 season and the first season in the Premier League era where a Welsh team competed. They replaced Birmingham City, Blackpool and West Ham United, who were relegated to the Championship after their top-flight spells of two, one and six years respectively.

=== Stadiums and locations ===
Locations of the 2011–12 Premier League teams
Greater London Premier League football clubs
Greater Manchester Premier League football clubs

Team	Location	Stadium	Capacity
Arsenal	London (Holloway)	Emirates Stadium	60,361
Aston Villa	Birmingham	Villa Park	42,785
Blackburn Rovers	Blackburn	Ewood Park	31,154
Bolton Wanderers	Bolton	Reebok Stadium	28,723
Chelsea	London (Fulham)	Stamford Bridge	42,449
Everton	Liverpool (Walton)	Goodison Park	40,157
Fulham	London (Fulham)	Craven Cottage	25,700
Liverpool	Liverpool (Anfield)	Anfield	45,276
Manchester City	Manchester (Bradford)	City of Manchester Stadium	47,405
Manchester United	Stretford (Old Trafford)	Old Trafford	75,811
Newcastle United	Newcastle upon Tyne	St James' Park	52,409
Norwich City	Norwich	Carrow Road	27,183
Queens Park Rangers	London (Shepherd's Bush)	Loftus Road	18,439
Stoke City	Stoke-on-Trent	Britannia Stadium	27,740
Sunderland	Sunderland	Stadium of Light	49,000
Swansea City	Swansea	Liberty Stadium	20,520
Tottenham Hotspur	London (Tottenham)	White Hart Lane	36,230
West Bromwich Albion	West Bromwich	The Hawthorns	27,877
Wigan Athletic	Wigan	DW Stadium	25,133
Wolverhampton Wanderers	Wolverhampton	Molineux Stadium	27,828 (Note: Molineux underwent redevelopment during the 2011–12 season. The season began with capacity limited to 24,259, but increased with the opening of the bottom of a two-tier new stand during September 2011.)

=== Personnel and kits ===
Note: Flags indicate national team as has been defined under FIFA eligibility rules. Players may hold more than one non-FIFA nationality.

Team	Manager	Captain	Kit manufacturer	Shirt sponsor
Arsenal	(France) Arsène Wenger	(Netherlands) Robin van Persie	Nike	Emirates
Aston Villa	(Scotland) Alex McLeish	(Bulgaria) Stiliyan Petrov^{4}	Nike	Genting Casinos
Blackburn Rovers	(Scotland) Steve Kean	(England) Paul Robinson^{5}	Umbro	The Prince's Trust
Bolton Wanderers	(Republic of Ireland) Owen Coyle	(England) Kevin Davies	Reebok	188BET
Chelsea	(Italy) Roberto Di Matteo	(England) John Terry	Adidas	Samsung
Everton	(Scotland) David Moyes	(England) Phil Neville	Le Coq Sportif	Chang Beer
Fulham	(Netherlands) Martin Jol	(England) Danny Murphy	Kappa	FxPro
Liverpool	(Scotland) Kenny Dalglish	(England) Steven Gerrard	Adidas	Standard Chartered
Manchester City	(Italy) Roberto Mancini	(Belgium) Vincent Kompany	Umbro	Etihad Airways
Manchester United	(Scotland) Sir Alex Ferguson	(Serbia) Nemanja Vidić^{6}	Nike	Aon
Newcastle United	(England) Alan Pardew	(Argentina) Fabricio Coloccini	Puma	Northern Rock/Virgin Money^{1}
Norwich City	(Scotland) Paul Lambert	(England) Grant Holt	Erreà	Aviva
Queens Park Rangers	(Wales) Mark Hughes	(England) Joey Barton	Lotto	No sponsor^{7}/Malaysia Airlines and AirAsia^{2}
Stoke City	(Wales) Tony Pulis	(England) Ryan Shawcross	Adidas	Britannia
Sunderland	(Northern Ireland) Martin O'Neill	(England) Lee Cattermole	Umbro	Tombola
Swansea City	(Northern Ireland) Brendan Rodgers	(England) Garry Monk	Adidas	32Red
Tottenham Hotspur	(England) Harry Redknapp	(England) Ledley King	Puma	Aurasma^{3}
West Bromwich Albion	(England) Roy Hodgson	(Northern Ireland) Chris Brunt	Adidas	Bodog
Wigan Athletic	(Spain) Roberto Martínez	(Scotland) Gary Caldwell	MiFit	12BET
Wolverhampton Wanderers	(England) Terry Connor	(England) Roger Johnson	BURRDA	Sportingbet

- ^{1} Following Virgin Money's acquisition of Northern Rock on 1 January 2012, Virgin Money started to appear on the team's kits from 4 January 2012.
- ^{2} Malaysia Airlines appeared on Queens Park Rangers' home kit, with AirAsia appearing on their two away kits.
- ^{3} Aurasma is a subsidiary of Autonomy
- ^{4}Stiliyan Petrov was Villa's captain until March, when he was diagnosed with acute leukaemia. Gabriel Agbonlahor was handed the captaincy in Petrov's absence.
- ^{5}Chris Samba was previously Blackburn's captain. Following Samba's transfer to Anzhi Makhachkala, Robinson was handed the captaincy.
- ^{6}On 7 December 2011, Vidić twisted his knee during United's Champions League clash at Basel and left the field on a stretcher. Vidić missed the rest of the season and Patrice Evra assumed the captaincy of Manchester United.
- ^{7} Queens Park Rangers ran sponsorless until 12 September 2011

In addition, Nike had a new design for their match ball (white from August to October and March to May; high-visibility yellow from November through February) called Seitiro, featuring a modified flame design.

=== Managerial changes ===
Team	Outgoing manager	Manner of departure	Date of vacancy	Position at departure	Incoming manager	Date of appointment
Chelsea	(Italy) Carlo Ancelotti	Sacked	22 May 2011	Pre-season	(Portugal) André Villas-Boas	22 June 2011
Aston Villa	(France) Gérard Houllier	Resigned on grounds of ill health	1 June 2011	Pre-season	(Scotland) Alex McLeish	17 June 2011
Fulham	(Wales) Mark Hughes	Resigned	2 June 2011	Pre-season	(Netherlands) Martin Jol	7 June 2011
Sunderland	(England) Steve Bruce	Sacked	30 November 2011	16th	(Northern Ireland) Martin O'Neill	3 December 2011
Queens Park Rangers	(England) Neil Warnock	Sacked	8 January 2012	17th	(Wales) Mark Hughes	10 January 2012
Wolverhampton Wanderers	(Republic of Ireland) Mick McCarthy	Sacked	13 February 2012	18th	(England) Terry Connor	24 February 2012
Chelsea	(Portugal) André Villas-Boas	Sacked	4 March 2012	5th	(Italy) Roberto Di Matteo	4 March 2012

== League table ==
Pos	Team	Pld	W	D	L	GF	GA	GD	Pts	Qualification or relegation
1	Manchester City (C)	38	28	5	5	93	29	+64	89	Qualification for the Champions League group stage
2	Manchester United	38	28	5	5	89	33	+56	89	Qualification for the Champions League group stage
3	Arsenal	38	21	7	10	74	49	+25	70	Qualification for the Champions League group stage
4	Tottenham Hotspur	38	20	9	9	66	41	+25	69	Qualification for the Europa League group stage (Note: Chelsea won the Champions League and thus qualified for the group stage as defending champions, forfeiting their spot in the Europa League as the FA Cup winners. This meant that Tottenham were to compete in the Europa League group stage, since, pursuant to the rules, only four clubs from the Premier League could play in the Champions League.)
5	Newcastle United	38	19	8	11	56	51	+5	65	Qualification for the Europa League play-off round
6	Chelsea	38	18	10	10	65	46	+19	64	Qualification for the Champions League group stage
7	Everton	38	15	11	12	50	40	+10	56	
8	Liverpool	38	14	10	14	47	40	+7	52	Qualification for the Europa League third qualifying round (Note: Liverpool won the League Cup and thus qualified for the Europa League third qualifying round.)
9	Fulham	38	14	10	14	48	51	−3	52	
10	West Bromwich Albion	38	13	8	17	45	52	−7	47	
11	Swansea City	38	12	11	15	44	51	−7	47	
12	Norwich City	38	12	11	15	52	66	−14	47	
13	Sunderland	38	11	12	15	45	46	−1	45	
14	Stoke City	38	11	12	15	36	53	−17	45	
15	Wigan Athletic	38	11	10	17	42	62	−20	43	
16	Aston Villa	38	7	17	14	37	53	−16	38	
17	Queens Park Rangers	38	10	7	21	43	66	−23	37	
18	Bolton Wanderers (R)	38	10	6	22	46	77	−31	36	Relegation to Football League Championship
19	Blackburn Rovers (R)	38	8	7	23	48	78	−30	31	Relegation to Football League Championship
20	Wolverhampton Wanderers (R)	38	5	10	23	40	82	−42	25	Relegation to Football League Championship

Source: Barclays Premier League
Rules for classification: 1) points; 2) goal difference; 3) number of goals scored.
(C) Champions; (R) Relegated

== Results ==
Home \ Away	ARS	AVL	BLB	BOL	CHE	EVE	FUL	LIV	MCI	MUN	NEW	NOR	QPR	STK	SUN	SWA	TOT	WBA	WIG	WOL
Arsenal	—	3–0	7–1	3–0	0–0	1–0	1–1	0–2	1–0	1–2	2–1	3–3	1–0	3–1	2–1	1–0	5–2	3–0	1–2	1–1
Aston Villa	1–2	—	3–1	1–2	2–4	1–1	1–0	0–2	0–1	0–1	1–1	3–2	2–2	1–1	0–0	0–2	1–1	1–2	2–0	0–0
Blackburn Rovers	4–3	1–1	—	1–2	0–1	0–1	3–1	2–3	0–4	0–2	0–2	2–0	3–2	1–2	2–0	4–2	1–2	1–2	0–1	1–2
Bolton Wanderers	0–0	1–2	2–1	—	1–5	0–2	0–3	3–1	2–3	0–5	0–2	1–2	2–1	5–0	0–2	1–1	1–4	2–2	1–2	1–1
Chelsea	3–5	1–3	2–1	3–0	—	3–1	1–1	1–2	2–1	3–3	0–2	3–1	6–1	1–0	1–0	4–1	0–0	2–1	2–1	3–0
Everton	0–1	2–2	1–1	1–2	2–0	—	4–0	0–2	1–0	0–1	3–1	1–1	0–1	0–1	4–0	1–0	1–0	2–0	3–1	2–1
Fulham	2–1	0–0	1–1	2–0	1–1	1–3	—	1–0	2–2	0–5	5–2	2–1	6–0	2–1	2–1	0–3	1–3	1–1	2–1	5–0
Liverpool	1–2	1–1	1–1	3–1	4–1	3–0	0–1	—	1–1	1–1	3–1	1–1	1–0	0–0	1–1	0–0	0–0	0–1	1–2	2–1
Manchester City	1–0	4–1	3–0	2–0	2–1	2–0	3–0	3–0	—	1–0	3–1	5–1	3–2	3–0	3–3	4–0	3–2	4–0	3–0	3–1
Manchester United	8–2	4–0	2–3	3–0	3–1	4–4	1–0	2–1	1–6	—	1–1	2–0	2–0	2–0	1–0	2–0	3–0	2–0	5–0	4–1
Newcastle United	0–0	2–1	3–1	2–0	0–3	2–1	2–1	2–0	0–2	3–0	—	1–0	1–0	3–0	1–1	0–0	2–2	2–3	1–0	2–2
Norwich City	1–2	2–0	3–3	2–0	0–0	2–2	1–1	0–3	1–6	1–2	4–2	—	2–1	1–1	2–1	3–1	0–2	0–1	1–1	2–1
Queens Park Rangers	2–1	1–1	1–1	0–4	1–0	1–1	0–1	3–2	2–3	0–2	0–0	1–2	—	1–0	2–3	3–0	1–0	1–1	3–1	1–2
Stoke City	1–1	0–0	3–1	2–2	0–0	1–1	2–0	1–0	1–1	1–1	1–3	1–0	2–3	—	0–1	2–0	2–1	1–2	2–2	2–1
Sunderland	1–2	2–2	2–1	2–2	1–2	1–1	0–0	1–0	1–0	0–1	0–1	3–0	3–1	4–0	—	2–0	0–0	2–2	1–2	0–0
Swansea City	3–2	0–0	3–0	3–1	1–1	0–2	2–0	1–0	1–0	0–1	0–2	2–3	1–1	2–0	0–0	—	1–1	3–0	0–0	4–4
Tottenham Hotspur	2–1	2–0	2–0	3–0	1–1	2–0	2–0	4–0	1–5	1–3	5–0	1–2	3–1	1–1	1–0	3–1	—	1–0	3–1	1–1
West Bromwich Albion	2–3	0–0	3–0	2–1	1–0	0–1	0–0	0–2	0–0	1–2	1–3	1–2	1–0	0–1	4–0	1–2	1–3	—	1–2	2–0
Wigan Athletic	0–4	0–0	3–3	1–3	1–1	1–1	0–2	0–0	0–1	1–0	4–0	1–1	2–0	2–0	1–4	0–2	1–2	1–1	—	3–2
Wolverhampton Wanderers	0–3	2–3	0–2	2–3	1–2	0–0	2–0	0–3	0–2	0–5	1–2	2–2	0–3	1–2	2–1	2–2	0–2	1–5	3–1	—

Updated to match(es) played on 13 May 2012. Source: Barclays Premier League
Legend: Blue = home team win; Yellow = draw; Red = away team win.

== Season statistics ==
=== Scoring ===
- First goal of the season: Luis Suárez for Liverpool against Sunderland (13 August 2011)
- Last goal of the season: Sergio Agüero for Manchester City against Queens Park Rangers (13 May 2012).
- Fastest goal of the season: 24 seconds – Andrea Orlandi for Swansea City against Wolverhampton Wanderers (28 April 2012)
- Largest winning margin: 6 goals
  - Manchester United 8–2 Arsenal (28 August 2011)
  - Fulham 6–0 Queens Park Rangers (2 October 2011)
  - Arsenal 7–1 Blackburn Rovers (4 February 2012)
- Highest scoring game: 10 goals
  - Manchester United 8–2 Arsenal (28 August 2011)
- Most goals scored in a match by a single team: 8 goals
  - Manchester United 8–2 Arsenal (28 August 2011)
- Most goals scored in a match by a losing team: 3 goals
  - Blackburn Rovers 4–3 Arsenal (17 September 2011)
  - Chelsea 3–5 Arsenal (29 October 2011)

==== Top scorers ====
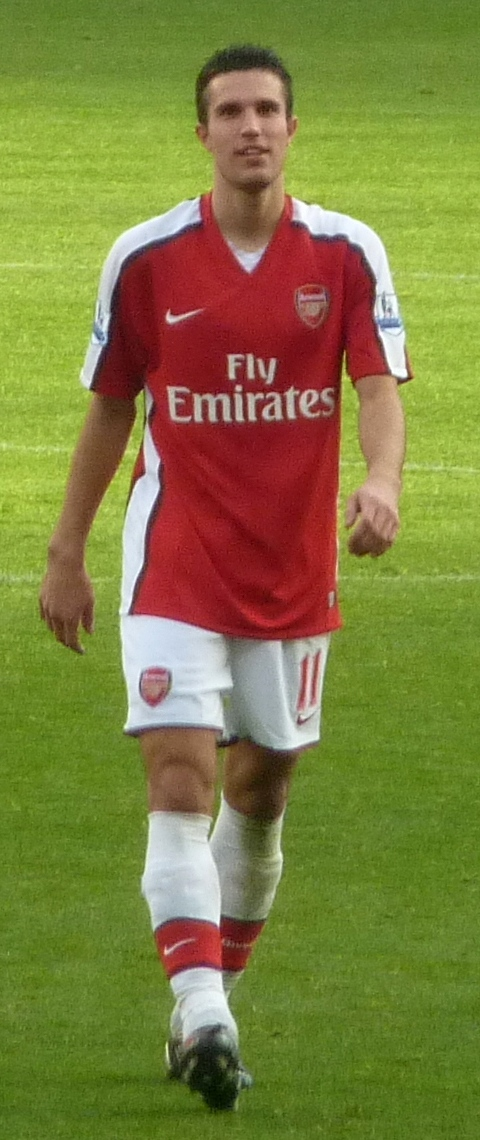
Robin van Persie won the 2011-12 Premier League Golden Boot.

Rank	Player	Club	Goals
1	(Netherlands) Robin van Persie	Arsenal	30
2	(England) Wayne Rooney	Manchester United	27
3	(Argentina) Sergio Agüero	Manchester City	23
4	(United States) Clint Dempsey	Fulham	17
4	(Togo) Emmanuel Adebayor	Tottenham Hotspur	17
4	(Nigeria) Yakubu	Blackburn Rovers	17
7	(Senegal) Demba Ba	Newcastle United	16
8	(England) Grant Holt	Norwich City	15
9	(Bosnia and Herzegovina) Edin Džeko	Manchester City	14
10	(Italy) Mario Balotelli	Manchester City	13
10	(Senegal) Papiss Cissé	Newcastle United	13

==== Hat-tricks ====
Player	For	Against	Result	Date
(Bosnia and Herzegovina) Edin Džeko^{4}	Manchester City	Tottenham Hotspur	5–1	28 August 2011
(England) Wayne Rooney	Manchester United	Arsenal	8–2	28 August 2011
(Argentina) Sergio Agüero	Manchester City	Wigan Athletic	3–0	10 September 2011
(England) Wayne Rooney	Manchester United	Bolton Wanderers	5–0	10 September 2011
(Senegal) Demba Ba	Newcastle United	Blackburn Rovers	3–1	24 September 2011
(England) Frank Lampard	Chelsea	Bolton Wanderers	5–1	2 October 2011
(England) Andrew Johnson	Fulham	Queens Park Rangers	6–0	2 October 2011
(Netherlands) Robin van Persie	Arsenal	Chelsea	5–3	29 October 2011
(Senegal) Demba Ba	Newcastle United	Stoke City	3–1	31 October 2011
(Nigeria) Yakubu^{4}	Blackburn Rovers	Swansea City	4–2	3 December 2011
(Bulgaria) Dimitar Berbatov	Manchester United	Wigan Athletic	5–0	26 December 2011
(United States) Clint Dempsey	Fulham	Newcastle United	5–2	21 January 2012
(Netherlands) Robin van Persie	Arsenal	Blackburn Rovers	7–1	4 February 2012
(Nigeria) Peter Odemwingie	West Bromwich Albion	Wolverhampton Wanderers	5–1	12 February 2012
(Russia) Pavel Pogrebnyak	Fulham	Wolverhampton Wanderers	5–0	4 March 2012
(England) Steven Gerrard	Liverpool	Everton	3–0	13 March 2012
(Argentina) Carlos Tevez	Manchester City	Norwich City	6–1	14 April 2012
(Uruguay) Luis Suárez	Liverpool	Norwich City	3–0	28 April 2012
(Spain) Fernando Torres	Chelsea	Queens Park Rangers	6–1	29 April 2012

- ^{4} Player scored four goals

==== 20,000th goal ====
On 21 December in a 2–1 loss to Arsenal at Villa Park, Marc Albrighton of Aston Villa was officially credited with the 20,000th goal scored since the formation of the Premier League in 1992. He was given £20,000 from league sponsor Barclays to donate to a charity of his choice. He chose Acorns Children's Hospice, who used to sponsor Aston Villa.

=== Clean sheets ===
==== Player ====
Rank	Player	Club	Clean sheets
1	(England) Joe Hart	Manchester City	17
2	(Netherlands) Tim Krul	Newcastle United	15
3	(United States) Brad Friedel	Tottenham Hotspur	14
3	(Netherlands) Michel Vorm	Swansea City	14
5	(Spain) David de Gea	Manchester United	13
5	(Poland) Wojciech Szczesny	Arsenal	13
7	(United States) Tim Howard	Everton	12
7	(Spain) Pepe Reina	Liverpool	12
9	(Belgium) Simon Mignolet	Sunderland	11
10	(Czech Republic) Petr Čech	Chelsea	10
10	(England) Ben Foster	West Bromwich Albion	10
10	(Australia) Mark Schwarzer	Fulham	10

==== Club ====
- Most clean sheets: 17
  - Manchester City
- Fewest clean sheets: 3
  - Blackburn Rovers
  - Bolton Wanderers
  - Norwich City

=== Discipline ===
==== Club ====
- Worst overall disciplinary record (1 point per yellow card, 2 points per red card):
  - Chelsea: 77 points (69 yellow & 4 red cards)
- Best overall disciplinary record:
  - Swansea City: 43 points (39 yellow & 2 red cards)
- Most yellow cards: 69
  - Chelsea
- Most red cards: 9
  - Queens Park Rangers

==== Player ====
- Most yellow cards: 10
  - Joey Barton (Queens Park Rangers)
  - Lee Cattermole (Sunderland)
  - Jason Lowe (Blackburn Rovers)
  - Alex Song (Arsenal)
- Most red cards: 2
  - Mario Balotelli (Manchester City)
  - Joey Barton (Queens Park Rangers)
  - Djibril Cissé (Queens Park Rangers)
  - David Wheater (Bolton Wanderers)

== Awards ==
=== Monthly awards ===
Month	Manager of the Month		Player of the Month	
Month	Manager	Club	Player	Club
August	(Scotland) Sir Alex Ferguson	Manchester United	(Bosnia and Herzegovina) Edin Džeko	Manchester City
September	(England) Harry Redknapp	Tottenham Hotspur	(Spain) David Silva	Manchester City
October	(Italy) Roberto Mancini	Manchester City	(Netherlands) Robin van Persie	Arsenal
November	(England) Harry Redknapp	Tottenham Hotspur	(England) Scott Parker	Tottenham Hotspur
December	(Northern Ireland) Martin O'Neill	Sunderland	(Senegal) Demba Ba	Newcastle United
January	(Northern Ireland) Brendan Rodgers	Swansea City	(Wales) Gareth Bale	Tottenham Hotspur
February	(France) Arsène Wenger	Arsenal	(Nigeria) Peter Odemwingie	West Bromwich Albion
March	(Scotland) Owen Coyle	Bolton Wanderers	(Iceland) Gylfi Sigurðsson	Swansea City
April	(Spain) Roberto Martínez	Wigan Athletic	(Croatia) Nikica Jelavić	Everton

=== Annual awards ===
Award	Winner	Club
Premier League Manager of the Season	(England) Alan Pardew	Newcastle United
Premier League Player of the Season	(Belgium) Vincent Kompany	Manchester City
Premier League Goal of the Season	(Ivory Coast) Papiss Cissé	Newcastle United
PFA Players' Player of the Year	(Netherlands) Robin van Persie	Arsenal
PFA Young Player of the Year	(England) Kyle Walker	Tottenham Hotspur
FWA Footballer of the Year	(Netherlands) Robin van Persie	Arsenal
PFA Fans' Player of the Year	(Netherlands) Robin van Persie	Arsenal

PFA Team of the Year
Goalkeeper	(England) Joe Hart (Manchester City)			
Defence	(England) Kyle Walker (Tottenham Hotspur)	(Belgium) Vincent Kompany (Manchester City)	(Argentina) Fabricio Coloccini (Newcastle United)	(England) Leighton Baines (Everton)
Midfield	(Spain) David Silva (Manchester City)	(Ivory Coast) Yaya Touré (Manchester City)	(England) Scott Parker (Tottenham Hotspur)	(Wales) Gareth Bale (Tottenham Hotspur)
Attack	(Netherlands) Robin van Persie (Arsenal)		(England) Wayne Rooney (Manchester United)	

== Attendances ==
#	Football club	Home games	Average attendance
1	Manchester United	19	75,387
2	Arsenal FC	19	60,000
3	Newcastle United	19	49,936
4	Manchester City	19	47,045
5	Liverpool FC	19	44,253
6	Chelsea FC	19	41,478
7	Sunderland AFC	19	39,095
8	Tottenham Hotspur	19	36,026
9	Aston Villa	19	33,873
10	Everton FC	19	33,228
11	Stoke City	19	27,226
12	Norwich City	19	26,606
13	Wolverhampton Wanderers	19	25,682
14	Fulham FC	19	25,293
15	West Bromwich Albion	19	24,798
16	Bolton Wanderers	19	23,670
17	Blackburn Rovers	19	22,551
18	Swansea City	19	19,946
19	Wigan Athletic	19	18,634
20	Queens Park Rangers	19	17,295
