= Jamie Mackie =

Scotland international footballer (born 1985)

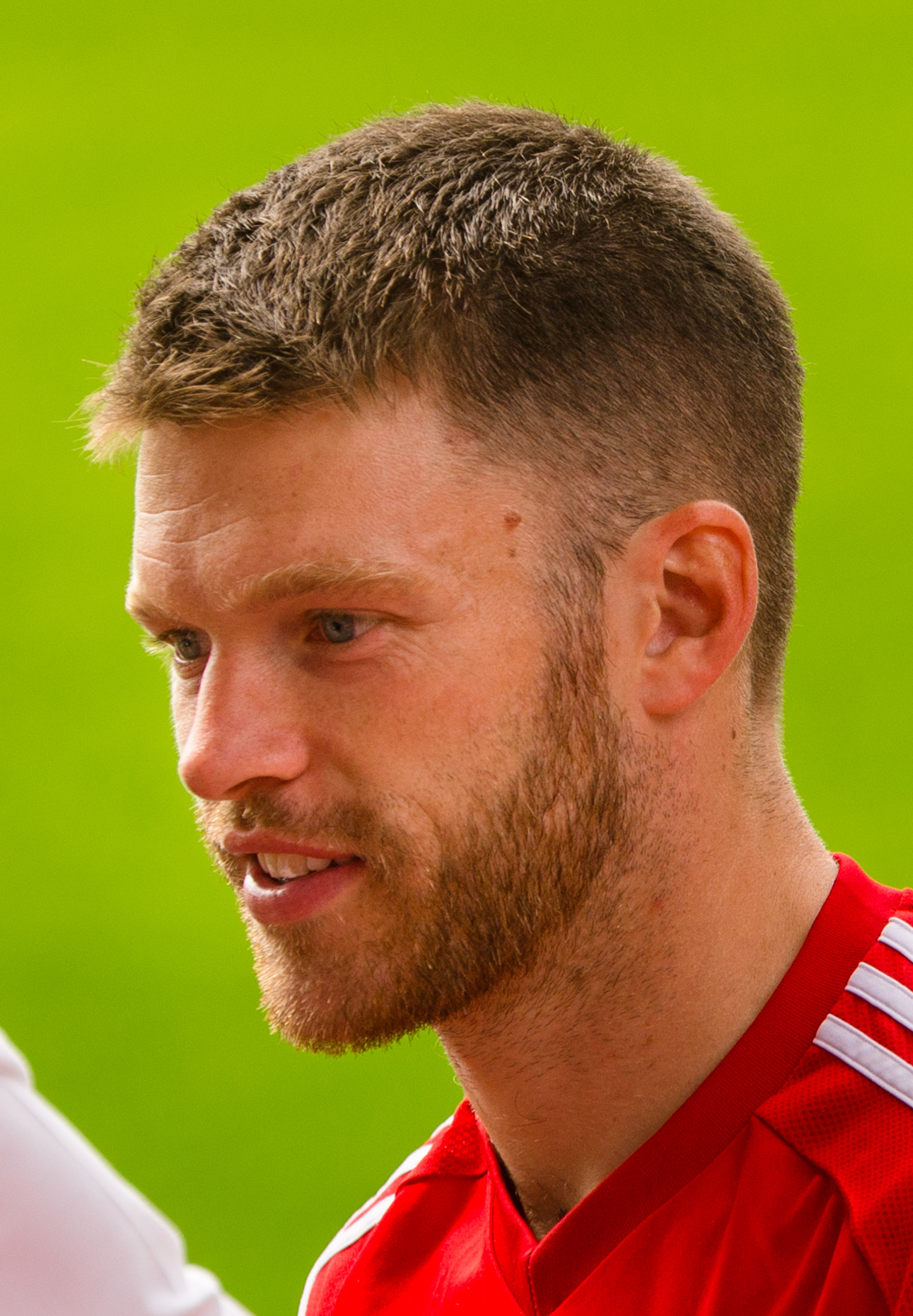
- Mackie with Nottingham Forest in 2014

Personal information
- Full name: James Charles Mackie
- Date of birth: 28 September 1985 (age 41)
- Place of birth: Dorking, England
- Height: 5 ft 11 in (1.80 m)
- Positions: Striker; winger

Youth career
- Leatherhead

Senior career*
Years	Team	Apps	(Gls)
2003–2004	Wimbledon	13	(0)
2004–2005	Milton Keynes Dons	3	(0)
2005–2008	Exeter City	87	(19)
2005	→ Sutton United (loan)	5	(2)
2008–2010	Plymouth Argyle	98	(16)
2010–2013	Queens Park Rangers	85	(18)
2013–2015	Nottingham Forest	45	(4)
2014–2015	→ Reading (loan)	32	(5)
2015–2018	Queens Park Rangers	54	(6)
2018–2020	Oxford United	74	(7)
Total		496	(77)

International career
2010–2012	Scotland	9	(2)
- * Club domestic league appearances and goals

James Charles Mackie (born 28 September 1985) is a former Scotland international footballer who played as a striker or winger, most notably for Queens Park Rangers, Plymouth Argyle, and Oxford United.

Mackie began his career at Wimbledon, progressing through the club's youth system and making his first-team debut in December 2003. A squad member when the club was renamed and moved to Milton Keynes, he made few appearances before joining Conference side Exeter City. He spent time on loan with Sutton United in 2005 and returned to establish himself as a first-team regular. His performances during the 2007–08 season attracted interest from other clubs and he signed for Plymouth Argyle in the January transfer window, scoring twice on his debut in the Championship. He appeared regularly for the club over the next two years and finished as the club's top goalscorer in the 2009–10 season. He joined Queens Park Rangers in May 2010, signing a four-year contract for an undisclosed fee. In 2013, he joined Nottingham Forest before signing on loan for Reading in 2014 and then returning to QPR in 2015. In July 2018, at the age of 32, he signed a two-year contract with Oxford United of League One. He retired from professional football in 2020.

== Early life ==
Born in Dorking, Surrey, Mackie attended The Ashcombe School in Dorking.

== Club career ==
=== Early career ===
Mackie began his career at non-league Leatherhead, joining Wimbledon as a trainee in 2003, before moving to Exeter City in August 2005. Following a brief loan spell at Sutton United in his first season, Mackie went on to become an established first-team player, scoring more than 20 goals in all competitions, from nearly 100 appearances, thus alerting other clubs of his potential.

=== Plymouth Argyle ===
After handing in a transfer request, Mackie signed for Plymouth Argyle, who had fought off competition from Bristol City, Norwich City, Bristol Rovers and Cheltenham Town, for an initial fee of £145,000. In his first appearance for Plymouth Argyle on 12 February 2008, coming on as a substitute against Barnsley, Mackie scored within eleven seconds of his arrival on the pitch, thus breaking the record held by Tony Witter for the fastest goal scored for Plymouth Argyle on a debut. He would go on to score a second in that game. He was featured 13 more times that season, mainly as a substitute, scoring his third goal for the club against Preston North End on 19 April 2008.

Mackie established himself as a first-team player during the 2008–09 season, making 45 appearances in all competitions, with the highlight being a 25-yard strike against Reading at Home Park. Having started life with the Pilgrims primarily as an impact substitute, Mackie subsequently became a regular name in the club's starting line-up. He played 44 times during the 2009–10 season, scoring a total of eight goals, although this was not enough to keep Plymouth in the second tier of English football.

=== Queens Park Rangers ===
==== 2010–11 season ====
In May 2010, Mackie signed a four–year contract with Queens Park Rangers for an undisclosed fee. Signed by Neil Warnock in what would be a Championship-winning season, he was mainly employed in a right wing or midfield position in Warnock's new 4–2–3–1 formation. Mackie got off to a good start at QPR, scoring on his debut in a 4–0 win over Barnsley. By mid-September Mackie had put himself top of the Championship goalscorers list with eight goals coming in his first seven league games, scoring doubles against Ipswich Town and Leicester City. He failed to score for 13 matches until netting the first in a 4–0 win over Swansea City on Boxing Day 2010. On 8 January, during an FA Cup tie against Blackburn Rovers, Mackie sustained a double tibia and fibula break during a collision with Rovers player Gael Givet. The injury kept the player out for seven months until he returned to training in September 2011. Although on the sidelines for the second half of the season, he had still participated enough to be awarded a Championship winner's medal as the team earned promotion to the Premier League for the first time in 15 years.

==== 2011–12 season ====
Mackie returned to QPR's first team with a substitute appearance in the October 2011 match at Fulham and then started his first Premier League match at home to Blackburn Rovers two weeks later. Mackie scored his first Premier League goal in a 3–2 home defeat to Sunderland. His return to the side saw him feature regularly under Neil Warnock until the manager was replaced in January 2012 by Mark Hughes. Under Hughes, Mackie continued to occupy a wide-midfield berth and featured in the victory against Wigan Athletic and the subsequent draw with Aston Villa. Replaced by Adel Taarabt (who returned from the 2012 Africa Cup of Nations) for the game against Wolves which ended in defeat, he came off the bench in the 66th minute to replace Akos Buzsaky against Blackburn Rovers at Ewood Park with the score 3–0 to the home side. He scored twice to bring the score back to 3–2 and nearly grabbed an equaliser to push for a regular place in the side. Mackie came off the bench for Joey Barton in the home game against Liverpool to inspire a comeback from 2–0 down, scoring the winner in a 3–2 victory at Loftus Road. He also scored QPR's second goal in the final match of the 2011–12 Premier League season in a 2–3 loss to Manchester City, who were crowned Champions that day.

==== 2012–13 season ====
On 16 May 2012, Mackie signed a one-year contract extension, committing himself to the club until 2015. He scored his first goal of the season in a 3–1 defeat to Manchester United at Old Trafford.

=== Nottingham Forest ===
On 25 July 2013, Mackie signed a three-year contract with Nottingham Forest for a reported fee of around £1 million. He scored his first Forest goal against Bolton Wanderers on 17 August 2013, Forest winning 3–0 at The City Ground.

==== Loan to Reading ====
On 8 August 2014, Mackie signed for Reading on loan for the 2014–15 season. He scored his first Reading goal, in the 29th minute, on 4 November 2014 in a 3–0 home win against Rotherham United. Two second-half goals were added by Simon Cox. On 16 March 2015, he scored the third goal in a 3–0 home win against Bradford City in the FA Cup to put Reading into their first FA Cup semi-final for 88 years.

=== Queens Park Rangers ===
On 16 June 2015, Mackie returned for a second spell at Queens Park Rangers, signing a two-year deal after his release by Nottingham Forest.

Mackie's return to Loftus Road was plagued with injuries, restricting him to fewer than 20 league starts in each of his three seasons. At the end of the 2017–18 season Mackie's contract had expired and it was agreed he would leave QPR at the end of the campaign. He played his final game for QPR when he came off of the bench in a 3–1 victory over Birmingham City on 28 April 2018.

=== Oxford United ===
On 18 July 2018, Oxford United of League One announced that Mackie had signed a two-year contract. He was given the number 19 shirt and made his debut in the opening match of the season, a 4–0 defeat away at Barnsley. After a few weeks on the sidelines because of a hip injury, Mackie scored his first goal in the 4th minute of a bottom-of-the-table fixture against Plymouth Argyle on 13 October, which ended in a 2–0 victory for Oxford.

He announced his retirement at the end of the 2019–20 season, at the age of 34.

== International career ==
On 24 August 2010, Mackie stated that he wanted to play internationally for Scotland. Mackie qualifies to play for Scotland as his grandfather was born in Kilmarnock. The following day, Scotland coach Craig Levein indicated he may call Mackie up for the October UEFA Euro 2012 qualifiers against the Czech Republic and Spain. On 30 September 2010, it was announced that Mackie had been called up to play for Scotland after helping QPR to a very promising start to the season. He started the match against the Czech Republic at the Synot Tip Arena, but the match ended in a 1–0 win for the Czech Republic. He scored his first international goal in a friendly match against the Faroe Islands on 16 November 2010. On 1 November 2011, Mackie was called up to the squad to face Cyprus on 11 November. Mackie started the game, and scored in the 56th minute.

== Career statistics ==
=== Club ===
Appearances and goals by club, season and competition
Club	Season	League			FA Cup		League Cup		Other		Total	
Club	Season	Division	Apps	Goals	Apps	Goals	Apps	Goals	Apps	Goals	Apps	Goals
Wimbledon	2003–04	Division One	13	0	3	0	0	0	—		16	0
Milton Keynes Dons	2004–05	League One	3	0	0	0	0	0	1 (Note: Appearance(s) in Football League Trophy)	0	4	0
Exeter City	2005–06	Conference Premier	23	3	0	0	—		3 (Note: One appearance in Football League Trophy; two appearances, one goal in FA Trophy)	1	26	4
Exeter City	2006–07	Conference Premier	40	5	1	0	—		4 (Note: One appearance in FA Trophy, three in Football Conference play-offs)	0	45	5
Exeter City	2007–08	Conference Premier	24	11	2	1	—		1 (Note: Appearance(s) in FA Trophy)	0	27	12
Exeter City	Total		87	19	3	1	—		8	1	98	21
Sutton United (loan)	2005–06	Conference South	5	2	0	0	—		0	0	5	2
Plymouth Argyle	2007–08	Championship	13	3	0	0	0	0	—		13	3
Plymouth Argyle	2008–09	Championship	43	5	1	0	1	0	—		45	5
Plymouth Argyle	2009–10	Championship	42	8	1	0	1	0	—		44	8
Plymouth Argyle	Total		98	16	2	0	2	0	—		102	16
Queens Park Rangers	2010–11	Championship	25	8	1	1	1	0	—		27	9
Queens Park Rangers	2011–12	Premier League	31	7	3	0	0	0	—		34	8
Queens Park Rangers	2012–13	Premier League	29	2	3	0	1	0	—		33	2
Queens Park Rangers	Total		85	18	7	1	2	0	—		94	19
Nottingham Forest	2013–14	Championship	45	4	3	1	1	0	—		49	5
Reading (loan)	2014–15	Championship	32	5	5	1	2	0	—		39	6
Queens Park Rangers	2015–16	Championship	17	1	1	0	0	0	—		18	1
Queens Park Rangers	2016–17	Championship	18	1	1	0	0	0	—		19	1
Queens Park Rangers	2017–18	Championship	19	4	1	0	0	0	–		20	4
Queens Park Rangers	Total		54	6	3	0	0	0	—		57	6
Oxford United	2018–19	League One	42	5	4	1	1	0	1	0	48	6
Oxford United	2019–20	League One	32	2	4	0	4	0	3 (Note: One appearance in Football League Trophy, two appearances in League One play-offs)	0	43	2
Oxford United	Total		74	7	8	1	5	0	4	0	91	8
Career total			496	77	34	5	12	0	13	1	555	83

=== International ===
Appearances and goals by national team and year
National team	Year	Apps	Goals
Scotland	2010	3	1
Scotland	2011	1	1
Scotland	2012	5	0
Total		9	2

Scores and results list Scotland's goal tally first, score column indicates score after each Mackie goal

List of international goals scored by Jamie Mackie
No.	Date	Venue	Opponent	Score	Result	Competition
1	16 November 2010	Pittodrie Stadium, Aberdeen, Scotland	Faroe Islands	3–0	3–0	Friendly
2	11 November 2011	Antonis Papadopoulos Stadium, Larnaca, Cyprus	Cyprus	2–0	2–1	Friendly

== Honours ==
Queens Park Rangers

- Football League Championship: 2010–11

== See also ==
- List of Scotland international footballers born outside Scotland
