= 2012–13 Queens Park Rangers F.C. season =

English football club season

Queens Park Rangers
2012–13 season
- Chairman: Tony Fernandes
- Manager: Mark Hughes (until 23 November 2012); Harry Redknapp (from 24 November 2012)
- Stadium: Loftus Road
- Premier League: 20th (relegated)
- FA Cup: Fourth round
- League Cup: Third round
- Top goalscorer: League: Loïc Rémy (6); All: Loïc Rémy (6)
- Highest home attendance: 18,337 v Manchester United (23 February 2013)
- Lowest home attendance: 16,658 v Wigan Athletic (7 April 2013)
- Average home league attendance: 17,779
- Biggest win: 3-0 Vs Walsall (28 August 2012)
- Biggest defeat: 0-5 Vs Swansea (18 August 2012)
Home colours	Away colours	Third colours

The 2012–13 season was Queens Park Rangers' 124th professional season and their sixth season in the Premier League. They were relegated on 28 April 2013 after a goalless draw with Reading at the Madejski Stadium.

== Kit ==
Lotto Sport Italia continued as manufacturers of QPR's kit. Airline AirAsia continued as kit sponsor.

== Players ==
As of the end of the season.

=== First team squad ===
No.	Name	Nationality	Since	Position (s)	Date of birth (age)	Signed from
Goalkeepers
1	Robert Green	(England)	2012	GK	18 January 1980 (aged 33)	(England) West Ham United
26	Brian Murphy	(Republic of Ireland)	2011	GK	7 May 1983 (aged 30)	(England) Ipswich Town
33	Júlio César	(Brazil)	2012	GK	3 September 1979 (aged 33)	(Italy) Inter Milan
Defenders
3	Armand Traoré	(Senegal) (Note: Traoré was born in Chatenay-Malabry, France, and represented them at U-17, U-18, U-19, and U-21 level, but also qualifies to represent Senegal internationally and made his international debut for Senegal in August 2011.)	2011	LB	8 October 1989 (aged 23)	(England) Arsenal
5	Christopher Samba	(Republic of the Congo) (Note: Samba was born in Créteil, France, but also qualifies to represent the Congo internationally and made his international debut for the Congo in 2004.)	2013	CB	29 March 1984 (aged 29)	(Russia) Anzhi Makhachkala
6	Clint Hill	(England)	2010	CB / LB	19 October 1978 (aged 34)	(England) Crystal Palace
13	Yun Suk-young	(South Korea)	2013	LB	13 February 1990 (aged 23)	(South Korea) Chunnam Dragons
15	Nedum Onuoha	(England) (Note: Onuoha was born in Warri, Nigeria, but was raised in England and has represented them at U-20 and U-21 level.)	2012	CB / RB	12 November 1986 (aged 26)	(England) Manchester City
19	José Bosingwa	(Portugal) (Note: Bosingwa was born in Mbandaka, Zaire (now Democratic Republic of the Congo), but was raised in Portugal and represented them at U-21 level before making his international debut for Portugal in June 2007.)	2012	RB	24 August 1982 (aged 30)	(England) Chelsea
20	Fábio	(Brazil)	2012	RB / LB	9 July 1990 (aged 22)	On loan from (England) Manchester United
21	Tal Ben Haim	(Israel)	2013	CB / RB	31 March 1982 (aged 31)	Unattached
Midfielders
4	Shaun Derry	(England)	2010	DM	6 December 1977 (aged 35)	(England) Crystal Palace
7	Park Ji-sung	(South Korea)	2012	RM	25 February 1981 (aged 32)	(England) Manchester United
10	Adel Taarabt	(Morocco) (Note: Taarabt was born in Fez, Morocco, but was raised in France and represented them at U-17 and U-19 level before making his international debut for Morocco in February 2009.)	2009	AM / LW	24 May 1989 (aged 24)	(England) Tottenham Hotspur
11	Shaun Wright-Phillips	(England)	2011	RW / LW	25 October 1981 (aged 31)	(England) Manchester City
14	Esteban Granero	(Spain)	2012	CM / AM	2 July 1987 (aged 25)	(Spain) Real Madrid
16	Jermaine Jenas	(England)	2013	CM	18 February 1983 (aged 30)	(England) Tottenham Hotspur
23	Junior Hoilett	(Canada)	2012	RW / LW	5 June 1990 (aged 23)	(England) Blackburn Rovers
24	Samba Diakité	(Mali) (Note: Diakité was born in Montfermeil, France, but also qualifies to represent Mali internationally and made his international debut for Mali in January 2012.)	2012	DM / CM	24 January 1989 (aged 24)	(France) Nancy
29	Andros Townsend	(England)	2013	LW / RW	16 July 1991 (aged 21)	On loan from (England) Tottenham Hotspur
40	Stéphane Mbia	(Cameroon)	2012	DM / CB	20 May 1986 (aged 27)	(France) Marseille
Forwards
12	Jamie Mackie	(Scotland) (Note: Mackie was born in Dorking, England, but also qualifies to represent Scotland internationally through his grandfather and made his international debut for Scotland in October 2010.)	2010	ST / RW	22 September 1985 (aged 27)	(England) Plymouth Argyle
18	Loïc Rémy	(France)	2013	CF	2 January 1987 (aged 26)	(France) Marseille
25	Bobby Zamora	(England)	2012	CF	16 January 1981 (aged 32)	(England) Fulham
37	Jay Bothroyd	(England)	2011	CF	5 May 1982 (aged 31)	(Wales) Cardiff City

=== Reserves and development squad ===
No.	Name	Nationality	Position (s)	Date of birth (age)	Signed from
8	Andrew Johnson	(England)	ST	10 February 1981 (aged 32)	(England) Fulham
22	Hogan Ephraim	(England)	RW / LW	31 March 1988 (aged 25)	(England) West Ham United
28	Max Ehmer	(Germany)	LB	3 February 1992 (aged 21)	(England) Queens Park Rangers Academy
—	Radek Černý	(Czech Republic)	GK	18 February 1974 (aged 39)	(Czech Republic) Slavia Prague
—	Ángelo Balanta	(Colombia)	LW	1 July 1990 (aged 22)	(England) Queens Park Rangers Academy
—	Luke Young	(England)	RB	19 July 1979 (aged 33)	(England) Aston Villa
—	Sam Magri	(England) (Note: Magri was born in Portsmouth, England, and represented them at U-16, U-17, U-18, and U-19 level, but also qualifies to represent Malta internationally through his grandfather and represented them at U-21 level before making his international debut for Malta in November 2016.)	LB / CB / RB	3 July 1994 (aged 18)	(England) Portsmouth
—	Troy Hewitt	(England)	ST	10 February 1990 (aged 23)	(England) Harrow Borough

=== Out on loan ===
No.	Name	Nationality	Position (s)	Date of birth (age)	Loaned club	Loan Expiration
9	Djibril Cissé	(France)	ST	12 August 1981 (aged 31)	(Qatar) Al-Gharafa	31 May 2013
27	Michael Harriman	(Republic of Ireland) (Note: Harriman was born in Chichester, England, but also qualifies to represent the Republic of Ireland internationally and represented them at U-18, U-19, and U-21 level.)	RB	23 October 1992 (aged 20)	(England) Wycombe Wanderers	31 May 2013
30	Frankie Sutherland	(Republic of Ireland) (Note: Sutherland was born in Hillingdon, England, but also qualifies to represent the Republic of Ireland internationally through his grandmother and represented them at U-17, U-19, and U-21 level.)	CM	6 December 1993 (aged 19)	(England) Portsmouth	15 February 2013
32	Alejandro Faurlín	(Argentina)	CM	9 August 1986 (aged 26)	(Italy) Palermo	31 May 2013
34	Rob Hulse	(England)	CF	25 October 1979 (aged 33)	(England) Millwall	31 May 2013
35	Anton Ferdinand	(England)	CB	18 February 1985 (aged 28)	(Turkey) Bursaspor	31 May 2013
39	DJ Campbell	(England)	ST	12 October 1981 (aged 31)	(England) Blackburn Rovers	12 May 2013
—	Bruno Andrade	(Portugal)	AM	2 October 1993 (aged 19)	(England) Wycombe Wanderers	31 May 2013
—	Joey Barton	(England)	CM	2 September 1982 (aged 30)	(France) Marseille	31 May 2013
—	Michael Doughty	(Wales) (Note: Doughty was born in Westminster, England, but also qualifies to represent Wales internationally and has represented them at U-19 and U-21 level.)	CM	20 October 1992 (aged 20)	(Scotland) St Johnstone	31 May 2013
—	Tom Hitchcock	(England)	ST	1 October 1992 (aged 20)	(England) Bristol Rovers	31 May 2013

== Transfers ==
=== In ===
Date	No.	Pos.	Name	From	Fee	Source
1 July 2012	17	DF	(New Zealand) Ryan Nelsen	(England) Tottenham Hotspur	Free	
1 July 2012	8	FW	(England) Andy Johnson	(England) Fulham	Free	
1 July 2012	1	GK	(England) Robert Green	(England) West Ham United	Free	
1 July 2012	2	MF	(Mali) Samba Diakité	(France) Nancy	£3.5M	
9 July 2012	7	MF	(South Korea) Park Ji-sung	(England) Manchester United	£4M	
27 July 2012	23	MF	(Canada) Junior Hoilett	(England) Blackburn Rovers	Free	
17 August 2012	19	DF	(Portugal) José Bosingwa	(England) Chelsea	Free	
29 August 2012	33	GK	(Brazil) Júlio César	(Italy) Inter Milan	Free	
30 August 2012	14	MF	(Spain) Esteban Granero	(Spain) Real Madrid	£9M	
31 August 2012	–	DF	(England) Sam Magri	(England) Portsmouth	Free	
31 August 2012	40	MF	(Cameroon) Stéphane Mbia	(France) Marseille	£5M	
4 January 2013	21	DF	(Israel) Tal Ben Haim	Unattached	Free	
16 January 2013	18	FW	(France) Loïc Rémy	(France) Marseille	£8M	
30 January 2013	13	DF	(South Korea) Yun Suk-young	(South Korea) Chunnam Dragons	Undisclosed	
31 January 2013	5	DF	(Republic of the Congo) Christopher Samba	(Russia) Anzhi Makhachkala	£12.5M	
31 January 2013	16	MF	(England) Jermaine Jenas	(England) Tottenham Hotspur	£2M	

=== Out ===
Date	No.	Pos.	Name	To	Fee	Source
6 June 2012	15	DF	(Brazil) Bruno Perone	(Brazil) Linense	Free	
30 June 2012	27	DF	(England) Peter Ramage	(England) Crystal Palace	Free	
30 June 2012	28	DF	(Nigeria) Danny Shittu	(England) Millwall	Free	
30 June 2012	6	DF	(Wales) Danny Gabbidon	(England) Crystal Palace	Free	
30 June 2012	–	DF	(England) Gary Borrowdale	(England) Carrick Rangers	Released	
30 June 2012	5	DF	(England) Fitz Hall	(England) Watford	Free	
30 June 2012	37	MF	(England) Lee Cook	(England) Leyton Orient	Free	
30 June 2012	–	FW	(England) Rowan Vine	(Scotland) St Johnstone	Free	
30 June 2012	19	FW	(Ghana) Patrick Agyemang (Note: Agyemang was born in Waltham Forest, England, but also qualified to represent Ghana internationally and made his international debut for Ghana in May 2003.)	(England) Stevenage	Free	
11 July 2012	1	GK	(Republic of Ireland) Paddy Kenny (Note: Kenny was born in Halifax, England, but also qualified to represent the Republic of Ireland internationally through his parents and made his international debut for the Republic of Ireland in June 2004.)	(England) Leeds United	Undisclosed	
13 July 2012	14	MF	(Hungary) Ákos Buzsáky	Portsmouth	Free	
2 August 2012	22	FW	(Iceland) Heiðar Helguson	(Wales) Cardiff City	Undisclosed	
22 August 2012	16	DF	(England) Matthew Connolly	(Wales) Cardiff City	Undisclosed	
24 August 2012	21	MF	(England) Tommy Smith	(Wales) Cardiff City	Undisclosed	
8 January 2013	18	MF	(England) Kieron Dyer	Unattached	Released	
31 January 2013	17	MF	(New Zealand) Ryan Nelsen	Retired		

=== Loans in ===
Start	No.	Pos.	Name	From	Expiry	Source
2 July 2012	20	DF	(Brazil) Fábio	(England) Manchester United	1 July 2013	
31 January 2013	29	MF	(England) Andros Townsend	(England) Tottenham Hotspur	31 May 2013	

=== Loans out ===
Start	No.	Pos.	Name	To	Expiry	Source
31 August 2012	37	FW	(England) Jay Bothroyd	(England) Sheffield Wednesday	2 January 2013	
31 August 2012	17	MF	(England) Joey Barton	(France) Marseille	31 May 2013	
1 October 2012	34	FW	(England) Rob Hulse	(England) Charlton Athletic	1 January 2013	
5 October 2012	39	FW	(England) DJ Campbell	(England) Ipswich Town	5 January 2013	
15 January 2013	30	MF	(Republic of Ireland) Frankie Sutherland	(England) Portsmouth	15 February 2013	
20 January 2013	9	FW	(France) Djibril Cissé	(Qatar) Al-Gharafa	31 May 2013	
29 January 2013	35	DF	(England) Anton Ferdinand	(Turkey) Bursaspor	31 May 2013	
29 January 2013	34	FW	(England) Rob Hulse	(England) Millwall	31 May 2013	
31 January 2013	32	MF	(Argentina) Alejandro Faurlín	(Italy) Palermo	31 May 2013	

== Season statistics ==
=== Premier League table ===
Pos	Team	Pld	W	D	L	GF	GA	GD	Pts	Qualification or relegation
16	Newcastle United	38	11	8	19	45	68	−23	41	
17	Sunderland	38	9	12	17	41	54	−13	39	
18	Wigan Athletic (R)	38	9	9	20	47	73	−26	36	Qualification for the Europa League group stage and relegation to Football League Championship (Note: Wigan Athletic qualified for the Europa League group stage as the 2012–13 FA Cup winners.)
19	Reading (R)	38	6	10	22	43	73	−30	28	Relegation to Football League Championship
20	Queens Park Rangers (R)	38	4	13	21	30	60	−30	25	Relegation to Football League Championship

Source: Barclays Premier League
Rules for classification: 1) Points; 2) Goal difference; 3) Goals scored; 4) Play-offs (only if needed to decide champion, teams for relegation or teams for UEFA competitions).
(R) Relegated

=== Results summary ===
Overall								Home						Away					
Pld	W	D	L	GF	GA	GD	Pts	W	D	L	GF	GA	GD	W	D	L	GF	GA	GD
38	4	13	21	30	61	−31	25	2	8	9	13	28	−15	2	5	12	17	33	−16

Last updated: 19 May 2013.
Source: QPR.CO.UK

== Pre-season ==
17 July 2012 Asia Tour	Sabah Select XI (Malaysia)	0–5	Queens Park Rangers	Kota Kinabalu, Malaysia
20:15 MST		Report	Zamora 8'; Helguson 64'; Bothroyd 70'; Cissé 74', 82'	Stadium: Likas Stadium

20 July 2012 Asia Tour	Kelantan (Malaysia)	0–5	Queens Park Rangers	Kuala Lumpur, Malaysia
21:15 MST		Report	Wright-Phillips 17'; Harriman 53'; Mackie 73'; Zamora 82'; Helguson 90+1'	Stadium: Shah Alam Stadium

23 July 2012 Asia Tour	Persebaya Surabaya (Indonesia)	1–2	Queens Park Rangers	Surabaya, Indonesia
20:40 WIB	Soler 17'	Report	Taarabt 26' (pen.); Zamora 67'	Stadium: Gelora Bung Tomo Stadium

31 July 2012 Friendly	Wycombe Wanderers	0–3	Queens Park Rangers	High Wycombe
19:45 BST		Report	Mackie 30'; Wright-Phillips 71'; Onuoha 87'	Stadium: Adams Park; Attendance: 3,787

4 August 2012 Friendly	Trabzonspor (Turkey)	1–1	Queens Park Rangers	Unterschleißheim, Germany
19:00 CET	Čelůstka 57'	Report	Wright-Phillips 83'	Stadium: Hans-Bayer-Stadion

11 August 2012 Friendly	FC Augsburg (Germany)	2–2	Queens Park Rangers	Augsburg, Germany
16:00 CET	Bancé 17' (pen.); Ferdinand 37' (o.g.)	Report	Cissé 33', 55'	Stadium: SGL arena Attendance: 13,154; Referee: D. Aytekin

10 September 2012 Alan McDonald Tribute	Queens Park Rangers	v	Northern Ireland XI

== Competitions ==
=== Barclays Premier League ===
18 August 2012 1	Queens Park Rangers	0–5	Swansea City	London
15:00 BST		Report	Michu 8', 53'; Dyer 63', 71'; Sinclair 81'	Stadium: Loftus Road; Attendance: 18,072; Referee: L. Probert

25 August 2012 2	Norwich City	1–1	Queens Park Rangers	Norwich
15:00 BST	Jackson 11'	Report	Zamora 19'	Stadium: Carrow Road; Attendance: 26,317; Referee: M. Clattenburg

1 September 2012 3	Manchester City	3–1	Queens Park Rangers	Manchester
17:30 BST	Y. Touré 16'; Kolarov (yellow card) 45'; Džeko 61'; Rodwell (yellow card) 73'; Tevez 90+2'	Report	Zamora 59', (yellow card) 85'	Stadium: Etihad Stadium; Attendance: 45,579; Referee: C. Foy

15 September 2012 4	Queens Park Rangers	0–0	Chelsea	London
15:00 BST		Report	Ramires (yellow card) 14'; Bertrand (yellow card) 27'	Stadium: Loftus Road; Attendance: 18,271; Referee: A. Marriner

23 September 2012 5	Tottenham Hotspur	2–1	Queens Park Rangers	London
16:00 BST	Faurlín 59' (o.g.); Defoe 61'	Report	Zamora 34'	Stadium: White Hart Lane; Attendance: 36,052; Referee: P. Dowd

1 October 2012 6	Queens Park Rangers	1–2	West Ham United	London
20:00 BST	Taarabt 57'; Diakité (yellow card) 75' (yellow-red card)	Report	Jarvis 3'; Vaz Tê 35'	Stadium: Loftus Road; Attendance: 17,363; Referee: M. Clattenburg

6 October 2012 7	West Bromwich Albion	3–2	Queens Park Rangers	West Bromwich
15:00 BST	Morrison 5'; Gera 22'; Tamaș (yellow card) 25'; Mulumbu 85', (yellow card) 90+4'	Report	Taarabt 35'; Park (yellow card) 45+1'; Mackie (yellow card) 89'; Granero 90+2'	Stadium: The Hawthorns; Attendance: 23,987; Referee: M. Jones

21 October 2012 8	Queens Park Rangers	1–1	Everton	London
16:00 BST	Baines 2' (o.g.); Diakité (yellow card) 67'; Granero (yellow card) 90+4'	Report	Júlio César 33' (o.g.); Pienaar (yellow card) 53' (yellow-red card) 61'	Stadium: Loftus Road; Attendance: 17,959; Referee: J. Moss

27 October 2012 9	Arsenal	1–0	Queens Park Rangers	London
15:00 BST	Arteta 84'	Report	Mbia (red card) 79'	Stadium: Emirates Stadium; Attendance: 60,103; Referee: A. Taylor

4 November 2012 10	Queens Park Rangers	1–1	Reading	London
13:30 GMT	Cissé 66'	Report	Gorkšs 16'; Hunt (yellow card) 34'; Le Fondre (yellow card) 90+3'	Stadium: Loftus Road; Attendance: 16,797; Referee: M. Oliver

10 November 2012 11	Stoke City	1–0	Queens Park Rangers	Stoke-on-Trent
15:00 GMT	Adam 52'	Report		Stadium: Britannia Stadium; Attendance: 27,529; Referee: M. Atkinson

17 November 2012 12	Queens Park Rangers	1–3	Southampton	London
15:00 GMT	Hoilett 49'	Report	Lambert 23'; Puncheon 45+1'; Ferdinand 83' (o.g.)	Stadium: Loftus Road; Attendance: 18,174; Referee: M. Dean

24 November 2012 13	Manchester United	3–1	Queens Park Rangers	Manchester
15:00 GMT	Evans 64'; Fletcher 68'; Hernández 72'	Report	Mackie 52'	Stadium: Old Trafford; Attendance: 75,603; Referee: L. Probert

27 November 2012 14	Sunderland	0–0	Queens Park Rangers	Sunderland
19:45 GMT	Cuéllar (yellow card) 50'	Report	Diakité (yellow card) 54'; Hill (yellow card) 68'; Mackie (yellow card) 81'	Stadium: Stadium of Light; Attendance: 36,513; Referee: A. Marriner

1 December 2012 15	Queens Park Rangers	1–1	Aston Villa	London
15:00 GMT	Mackie 18'; Derry (yellow card) 61'	Report	Holman 8'; Baker (yellow card) 48'; Lowton (yellow card) 63'	Stadium: Loftus Road; Attendance: 17,387; Referee: H. Webb

8 December 2012 16	Wigan Athletic	2–2	Queens Park Rangers	Wigan
15:00 GMT	McCarthy 19', 74'	Report	Nelsen 26'; Cissé 71'	Stadium: DW Stadium; Attendance: 17,163; Referee: P. Dowd

15 December 2012 17	Queens Park Rangers	2–1	Fulham	London
15:00 GMT	Taarabt 52', 68'	Report	Petrić 88'	Stadium: Loftus Road; Attendance: 18,233; Referee: M. Atkinson

22 December 2012 18	Newcastle United	1–0	Queens Park Rangers	Newcastle
15:00 GMT	Ameobi 81'	Report		Stadium: Sports Direct Arena; Attendance: 50,180; Referee: K. Friend

26 December 2012 19	Queens Park Rangers	1–2	West Bromwich Albion	London
15:15 GMT (delayed due to traffic)	Cissé 68'	Report	Brunt 29'; Green 49' (o.g.)	Stadium: Loftus Road; Attendance: 17,782; Referee: C. Foy

30 December 2012 20	Queens Park Rangers	0–3	Liverpool	London
16:00 GMT		Report	Suárez 10', 16'; Agger 28'	Stadium: Loftus Road; Attendance: 18,304; Referee: A. Taylor

2 January 2013 21	Chelsea	0–1	Queens Park Rangers	London
19:45 GMT	Marin (yellow card) 3'	Report	Wright-Phillips 78'; Hill (yellow card) 85'	Stadium: Stamford Bridge; Attendance: 41,634; Referee: L. Mason

12 January 2013 22	Queens Park Rangers	0–0	Tottenham Hotspur	London
12:45 GMT	Mbia (yellow card) 70'	Report	Dembélé (yellow card) 39'	Stadium: Loftus Road; Attendance: 18,018; Referee: L. Probert

19 January 2013 23	West Ham United	1–1	Queens Park Rangers	London
15:00 GMT	J. Cole 68'	Report	Rémy 14'	Stadium: Boleyn Ground; Attendance: 34,962; Referee: H. Webb

29 January 2013 24	Queens Park Rangers	0–0	Manchester City	London
19:45 GMT	Mbia (yellow card) 40'; Granero (yellow card) 58'	Report	Barry (yellow card) 63'; Zabaleta (yellow card) 84'	Stadium: Loftus Road; Attendance: 17,894; Referee: P. Dowd

2 February 2013 25	Queens Park Rangers	0–0	Norwich City	London
12:45 GMT		Report		Stadium: Loftus Road; Attendance: 17,543; Referee: J. Moss

9 February 2013 26	Swansea City	4–1	Queens Park Rangers	Swansea
15:00 GMT	Michu 8', 67'; Rangel 18'; Hernández 50'	Report	Zamora 48'	Stadium: Liberty Stadium; Attendance: 20,529; Referee: N. Swarbrick

23 February 2013 27	Queens Park Rangers	0–2	Manchester United	London
15:00 GMT			Rafael 23'; Giggs 80'	Stadium: Loftus Road; Referee: A. Taylor

2 March 2013 28	Southampton	1–2	Queens Park Rangers	Southampton
15:00 GMT	Ramírez 45+1'	Report	Rémy 14'; Bothroyd 77'	Stadium: St Mary's Stadium; Attendance: 31,728; Referee: H. Webb

9 March 2013 29	Queens Park Rangers	3–1	Sunderland	London
15:00 GMT	Rémy 30'; Townsend 70'; Jenas 90'	Report	Fletcher 20'	Stadium: Loftus Road; Attendance: 18,169; Referee: M. Jones

16 March 2013 30	Aston Villa	3–2	Queens Park Rangers	Birmingham
15:00 GMT	Agbonlahor 45'; Weimann 59'; Benteke 81'	Report	Jenas 23'; Townsend 73'	Stadium: Villa Park; Attendance: 38,594; Referee: K. Friend

1 April 2013 31	Fulham	3–2	Queens Park Rangers	London
20:00 BST	Berbatov 8' (pen.), 22'; Hill 41' (o.g.); Sidwell (red card) 78'	Report	Taarabt 45'; Rémy 51'	Stadium: Craven Cottage; Attendance: 25,117; Referee: L. Probert

7 April 2013 32	Queens Park Rangers	1–1	Wigan Athletic	London
16:10 BST	Zamora (red card) 20'; Rémy 85'	Report	Maloney 90+4'	Stadium: Loftus Road; Attendance: 16,658; Referee: P. Dowd

13 April 2013 33	Everton	2–0	Queens Park Rangers	Liverpool
15:00 BST	Fellaini (yellow card) 35'; Gibson 40', (yellow card) 79'; Anichebe 56'; Pienaar (yellow card) 62'	Report	Bosingwa (yellow card) 34'; Granero (yellow card) 51'; Townsend (yellow card) 53'	Stadium: Goodison Park; Attendance: 34,876; Referee: L. Mason

20 April 2013 34	Queens Park Rangers	0–2	Stoke City	London
15:00 BST		Report	Crouch 42'; Walters 77' (pen.)	Stadium: Loftus Road; Attendance: 17,391; Referee: C. Foy

28 April 2013 35	Reading	0–0	Queens Park Rangers	Reading
13:30 BST		Report	Granero (yellow card) 72'; Fábio (yellow card) 90+2'	Stadium: Madejski Stadium; Attendance: 23,388; Referee: K. Friend

4 May 2013 36	Queens Park Rangers	0–1	Arsenal	London
17:30 BST		Report	Walcott 1'	Stadium: Loftus Road; Attendance: 18,178; Referee: J. Moss

12 May 2013 37	Queens Park Rangers	1–2	Newcastle United	London
15:00 BST	Rémy 11' (pen.)	Report	Ben Arfa 18' (pen.); Gouffran 35'; Elliot (yellow card) 68' (yellow-red card) 81'	Stadium: Loftus Road; Attendance: 17,278; Referee: L. Probert

19 May 2013 38	Liverpool	1–0	Queens Park Rangers	Liverpool
16:00 BST	Coutinho 23'	Report		Stadium: Anfield; Attendance: 44,792; Referee: M. Atkinson

=== FA Cup ===
5 January 2013 Round 3	Queens Park Rangers	1–1	West Bromwich Albion (Premier League)	London
15:00 GMT	Dyer 90+2'	Report	Long 79'	Stadium: Loftus Road; Attendance: 8,984; Referee: M. Clattenburg

15 January 2013 Round 3 replay	West Bromwich Albion (Premier League)	0–1	Queens Park Rangers	West Bromwich
20:00 GMT		Report	Bothroyd 75'	Stadium: The Hawthorns; Attendance: 11,184; Referee: M. Atkinson

26 January 2013 Round 4	Queens Park Rangers	2–4	Milton Keynes Dons (League One)	London
15:00 GMT	Bothroyd 83'; Fábio 90+2'	Report	Traoré 4' (o.g.); Lowe 40'; Harley 50'; Potter 56'	Stadium: Loftus Road; Attendance: 17,081; Referee: Mike Dean

=== Capital One Cup ===
28 August 2012 Round 2	Queens Park Rangers	3–0	Walsall (League One)	London
19:45 BST	Wright-Phillips 29'; Zamora 66'; Bosingwa 84'	Report		Stadium: Loftus Road; Attendance: 6,129; Referee: M. Naylor

26 September 2012 Round 3	Queens Park Rangers	2–3	Reading (Premier League)	London
19:45 BST	Hoilett 14'; Cissé 71'	Report	Gorkšs 16'; Shorey 77'; Pogrebnyak 81'	Stadium: Loftus Road; Attendance: 11,562

== Player statistics ==
=== Appearances, goals and discipline ===
No.	Pos.	Name	Barclays Premier League		FA Cup		Capital One Cup		Total		Discipline	
No.	Pos.	Name	Apps	Goals	Apps	Goals	Apps	Goals	Apps	Goals	Yellow card	Red card
1	GK	(England) Robert Green	14(2)	0	2	0	1	0	17(2)	0	0	0
2	MF	(Mali) Samba Diakité	11(3)	0	0	0	0(1)	0	11(4)	0	5	1
3	DF	(Senegal) Armand Traoré	23(2)	0	1	0	0(1)	0	24(3)	0	3	0
4	MF	(England) Shaun Derry	9(8)	0	1	0	0	0	10(8)	0	3	0
5	DF	(England) Anton Ferdinand	10(3)	0	2	0	1	0	13(3)	0	2	0
5	DF	(Republic of the Congo) Christopher Samba	10	0	0	0	0	0	10	0	2	0
6	DF	(England) Clint Hill	30	0	2	0	1	0	33	0	7	0
7	MF	(South Korea) Park Ji-sung	15(5)	0	3	0	2	0	20(5)	0	1	0
8	FW	(England) Andy Johnson	2(1)	0	0	0	1	0	3(1)	0	0	0
9	FW	(France) Djibril Cissé	12(7)	3	1	0	1(1)	1	14(8)	4	1	0
10	MF	(Morocco) Adel Taarabt	26(6)	5	1(1)	0	0	0	27(7)	5	5	0
11	MF	(England) Shaun Wright-Phillips	14(6)	1	0(1)	0	1	1	15(7)	2	0	0
12	FW	(Scotland) Jamie Mackie	18(11)	2	3	0	1	0	21(11)	2	1	0
13	DF	(South Korea) Yun Suk-young	0	0	0	0	0	0	0	0	0	0
14	MF	(Spain) Esteban Granero	19(5)	1	2	0	1	0	22(5)	1	7	0
15	DF	(England) Nedum Onuoha	15(8)	0	1(1)	0	1	0	17(9)	0	0	0
16	MF	(England) Jermaine Jenas	8(4)	2	0	0	0	0	8(4)	3	0	0
17	DF	(New Zealand) Ryan Nelsen	21	1	1	0	1(1)	0	23(1)	1	0	0
18	MF	(England) Kieron Dyer	1(3)	0	1	1	1(1)	0	3(4)	1	0	0
18	FW	(France) Loïc Rémy	13(1)	6	0	0	0	0	13(1)	6	1	0
19	DF	(Portugal) José Bosingwa	23(1)	0	0	0	1	1	24(1)	1	2	0
20	DF	(Brazil) Fábio	13(8)	0	1	1	1	0	15(8)	1	4	0
21	DF	(Israel) Tal Ben Haim	2(1)	0	3	0	0	0	5(1)	0	1	0
23	MF	(Canada) Junior Hoilett	14(11)	1	0	0	2	1	17(11)	2	1	0
25	FW	(England) Bobby Zamora	16(5)	4	0(1)	0	1(1)	1	17(7)	5	1	1
27	DF	(Republic of Ireland) Michael Harriman	1	0	0	0	0	0	1	0	0	0
29	MF	(England) Andros Townsend	12	2	0	0	0	0	12	2	2	0
32	MF	(Argentina) Alejandro Faurlín	10(1)	0	2	0	2	0	14(1)	0	1	0
33	GK	(Brazil) Júlio César	24	0	1	0	1	0	26	0	0	0
37	FW	(England) Jay Bothroyd	2(2)	1	2(1)	2	0	0	4(3)	3	1	0
39	FW	(England) DJ Campbell	0	0	2	0	0	0	2	0	0	0
40	DF	(Cameroon) Stéphane Mbia	29	0	1(1)	0	1	0	30(1)	0	10	1

=== Goalscorers ===
Rank	Player	Position	Premier League	FA Cup	League Cup	Total
1	(France) Loïc Rémy	FW	6	0	0	6
2	(Morocco) Adel Taarabt	MF	5	0	0	5
2	(England) Bobby Zamora	FW	4	0	1	5
4	(France) Djibril Cissé	FW	3	0	1	4
5	(England) Jay Bothroyd	FW	1	2	0	3
6	(Scotland) Jamie Mackie	FW	2	0	0	2
6	(England) Andros Townsend	MF	2	0	0	2
6	(England) Jermaine Jenas	MF	2	0	0	2
6	(Canada) Junior Hoilett	MF	1	0	1	2
6	(England) Shaun Wright-Phillips	MF	1	0	1	2
11	(Spain) Esteban Granero	MF	1	0	0	1
11	(New Zealand) Ryan Nelsen	DF	1	0	0	1
11	(England) Kieron Dyer	MF	0	1	0	1
11	(Brazil) Fábio	DF	0	1	0	1
11	(Portugal) José Bosingwa	DF	0	0	1	1
Own goals			1	0	0	1
Totals			30	4	5	39

=== Clean sheets ===
As of 22 August 2015

Rank	Player	Position	Premier League	League Cup	FA Cup	Total
1	(Brazil) Júlio César	GK	6	0	0	6
2	(England) Robert Green	GK	2	1	1	4
Total			8	1	1	10
