= 2014–15 Queens Park Rangers F.C. season =

English football club season

Queens Park Rangers F.C.
2014–15 season
- Chairman: Tony Fernandes
- Manager: Harry Redknapp (until 3 February); Chris Ramsey (from 12 February)
- Stadium: Loftus Road
- Premier League: 20th (relegated)
- FA Cup: Third round
- League Cup: Second round
- Top goalscorer: League: Charlie Austin (18); All: Charlie Austin (18)
- Highest home attendance: 18,098 (vs Manchester United, 17 January 2015)
- Lowest home attendance: 16,163 (vs Stoke City, 20 September 2014)
- Average home league attendance: 17,752
- Biggest win: 4-1 Vs West Bromwich Albion (4 April 2015)
- Biggest defeat: 0-6 Vs Manchester City (10 May 2015)
Home colours	Away colours	Third colours

The 2014–15 season was Queens Park Rangers's 126th professional season.

== Kit ==
Nike became new manufacturers of QPR's kit. Airline AirAsia continued as kit sponsor.

Home	Home alt.	Away	Away alt.	Away 2nd alt.	Third

== Players ==
As of 4 March 2015

=== First team squad ===
No.	Name	Nationality	Position (s)	Since	Date of birth (age)	Signed from	Games	Goals
Goalkeepers
1	Robert Green	(England)	GK	2012	18 January 1980 (aged 35)	(England) West Ham United	95	0
12	Alex McCarthy	(England)	GK	2014	3 December 1989 (aged 25)	(England) Reading	1	0
21	Brian Murphy	(Republic of Ireland)	GK	2011	7 May 1983 (aged 32)	(England) Ipswich Town	2	0
Defenders
3	Armand Traoré	(Senegal) (Note: Traoré was born in Chatenay-Malabry, France, and represented them at U-17, U-18, U-19, and U-21 level, but also qualifies to represent Senegal internationally and made his international debut for Senegal in August 2011.)	LB	2011	8 October 1989 (aged 25)	(England) Arsenal	83	2
4	Steven Caulker	(England)	CB	2014	29 December 1991 (aged 23)	(Wales) Cardiff City	30	1
5	Rio Ferdinand	(England)	CB	2014	7 November 1978 (aged 36)	(England) Manchester United	11	0
6	Clint Hill (captain)	(England)	CB	2010	19 October 1978 (aged 36)	(England) Crystal Palace	153	5
13	Yun Suk-young	(South Korea)	LB	2013	13 February 1990 (aged 25)	(South Korea) Chunnam Dragons	27	1
14	Mauricio Isla	(Chile)	RB	2014	12 June 1988 (aged 27)	on loan from (Italy) Juventus	25	0
15	Nedum Onuoha	(England) (Note: Onuoha was born in Warri, Nigeria, but was raised in England and has represented them at U-20 and U-21 level.)	CB	2012	12 November 1986 (aged 28)	(England) Manchester City	86	2
22	Richard Dunne	(Republic of Ireland)	CB	2013	21 September 1979 (aged 35)	(England) Aston Villa	60	1
38	Darnell Furlong	(England)	RB	2015	31 October 1995 (aged 19)	(England) Queens Park Rangers Academy	3	0
Midfielders
7	Matt Phillips	(Scotland) (Note: Phillips was born in Aylesbury, England, and represented them at U-19 and U-21 level, but also qualifies to represent Scotland internationally through his grandparents and made his international debut for Scotland in May 2012.)	RM	2013	25 October 1991 (aged 23)	(England) Blackpool	39	5
8	Joey Barton (vice-captain)	(England)	CM	2011	2 September 1982 (aged 32)	(England) Newcastle United	90	7
10	Leroy Fer	(Netherlands)	CM	2014	5 January 1990 (aged 25)	(England) Norwich City	24	4
11	Shaun Wright-Phillips	(England)	RM	2011	25 October 1981 (aged 33)	(England) Manchester City	65	1
18	Alejandro Faurlín	(Argentina)	CM	2009	9 August 1986 (aged 28)	(Argentina) Instituto Atlético	121	5
19	Niko Kranjčar	(Croatia)	AM	2013	13 August 1984 (aged 30)	on loan from (Ukraine) Dynamo Kyiv	52	3
20	Karl Henry	(England)	DM	2013	26 November 1982 (aged 32)	(England) Wolverhampton Wanderers	55	1
23	Junior Hoilett	(Canada)	LM	2012	5 June 1990 (aged 25)	(England) Blackburn Rovers	84	6
30	Sandro	(Brazil)	DM	2014	15 April 1989 (aged 26)	(England) Tottenham Hotspur	13	1
36	Michael Doughty	(Wales) (Note: Doughty was born in Westminster, England, but also qualifies to represent Wales internationally and has represented them at U-19 and U-21 level.)	LM	2010	20 November 1992 (aged 22)	(England) Queens Park Rangers Academy	3	0
Forwards
9	Charlie Austin	(England)	CF	2013	5 July 1989 (aged 25)	(England) Burnley	63	36
24	Eduardo Vargas	(Chile)	RW	2014	20 November 1989 (aged 25)	on loan from (Italy) Napoli	21	3
25	Bobby Zamora	(England)	CF	2012	16 January 1981 (aged 34)	(England) Fulham	82	13
27	Adel Taarabt	(Morocco) (Note: Taarabt was born in Fez, Morocco, but was raised in France and represented them at U-17 and U-19 level before making his international debut for Morocco in February 2009.)	LW / AM	2009	24 May 1989 (aged 26)	(England) Tottenham Hotspur	157	34
29	Mauro Zárate	(Argentina)	CF	2015	18 March 1987 (aged 28)	on loan from (England) West Ham United	4	0
39	Reece Grego-Cox	(Republic of Ireland) (Note: Grego-Cox was born in Hammersmith and Fulham, England, but also qualifies to represent the Republic of Ireland internationally through his grandparents and has represented them at U-17, U-19, and U-21 level.)	ST	2015	12 November 1996 (aged 18)	(England) Queens Park Rangers Academy	2	0

== Transfers ==
=== In ===
Date	No.	Pos.	Name	From	Fee	Source(s)
17 July 2014	5	DF	(England) Rio Ferdinand	(England) Manchester United	Free	
22 July 2014	4	DF	(England) Steven Caulker	(Wales) Cardiff City	£8M	
5 August 2014	17	MF	(England) Jordon Mutch	(Wales) Cardiff City	£6M	
20 August 2014	10	MF	(Netherlands) Leroy Fer	(England) Norwich City	£8M	
28 August 2014	–	DF	(England) Jack Robinson	(England) Liverpool	£1M	
29 August 2014	12	GK	(England) Alex McCarthy	(England) Reading	£3M	
1 September 2014	30	MF	(Brazil) Sandro	(England) Tottenham Hotspur	£6M	
8 January 2015	–	MF	(Republic of Ireland) Ryan Manning	(Republic of Ireland) Galway United	Free	

=== Out ===
Date	No.	Pos.	Name	To	Fee	Source(s)
7 June 2014	35	MF	(Israel) Yossi Benayoun	(Israel) Maccabi Haifa	Free	
1 July 2014	–	MF	(Colombia) Ángelo Balanta	(England) Bristol Rovers	Free	
1 July 2014	22	MF	(England) Hogan Ephraim	(England) Wycombe Wanderers	Free	
1 July 2014	29	FW	(England) Tom Hitchcock	(England) Milton Keynes Dons	Free	
1 July 2014	18	DF	(Northern Ireland) Aaron Hughes	(England) Brighton & Hove Albion	Free	
1 July 2014	8	FW	(England) Andrew Johnson	(England) Crystal Palace	Free	
1 July 2014	–	MF	(Cameroon) Stéphane Mbia	(Spain) Sevilla	Free	
1 July 2014	21	DF	(England) Luke Young	Retirement	N/A	
1 July 2014	–	AM	(South Korea) Park Ji-sung	Retirement	N/A	
28 July 2014	14	MF	(Spain) Esteban Granero	(Spain) Real Sociedad	Undisclosed	
5 August 2014	36	MF	(England) Gary O'Neil	(England) Norwich City	Free	
5 August 2014	34	FW	(England) Mo Shariff	(England) Bradford City	Free	
19 August 2014	33	GK	(Brazil) Júlio César	(Portugal) Benfica	Free	
26 August 2014	–	MF	(Canada) Dylan Carreiro	(Scotland) Dundee	Free	
30 August 2014	2	DF	(England) Danny Simpson	(England) Leicester City	Undisclosed	
31 August 2014	19	FW	(France) Loïc Rémy	(England) Chelsea	£10.5M	
14 January 2015	–	FW	(England) Josh Laurent	(England) Brentford	Undisclosed	
29 January 2015	17	MF	(England) Jordon Mutch	(England) Crystal Palace	£4.75M	

=== Loaned in ===
Start	No.	Pos.	Name	From	Expiry	Source(s)
6 August 2014	14	RM	(Chile) Mauricio Isla	(Italy) Juventus	30 June 2015	
21 August 2014	24	ST	(Chile) Eduardo Vargas	(Italy) Napoli	30 June 2015	
1 September 2014	19	MF	(Croatia) Niko Kranjčar	(Ukraine) Dynamo Kyiv	30 June 2015	
6 January 2015	29	ST	(Argentina) Mauro Zárate	(England) West Ham United	30 June 2015	

=== Loaned out ===
Start	No.	Pos.	Name	To	Expiry	Source(s)
18 July 2014	24	MF	(Mali) Samba Diakité (Note: Diakité was born in Montfermeil, France, but also qualifies to represent Mali internationally and made his international debut for Mali in January 2012.)	(Saudi Arabia) Al-Ittihad FC	30 June 2015	
23 August 2014	–	GK	(England) Joe Lumley	(England) Accrington Stanley	20 September 2014	
28 August 2014	–	DF	(England) Jack Robinson	(England) Huddersfield Town	30 June 2015	
4 September 2014	–	DF	(Australia) James Haran	(England) Arlesey Town	2 October 2014	
11 September 2014	42	MF	(Canada) Michael Petrasso	(England) Leyton Orient	12 October 2014	
9 October 2014	37	DF	(Republic of Ireland) Michael Harriman (Note: Harriman was born in Chichester, England, but also qualifies to represent the Republic of Ireland internationally and represented them at U-18, U-19, and U-21 level.)	(England) Luton Town	30 June 2015	
10 October 2014	–	DF	(Northern Ireland) Jamie Sendles-White (Note: Sendles-White was born in Kingston upon Thames, England, but also qualifies to represent Northern Ireland internationally and has represented them at U-19, U-20, and U-21 level.)	(England) Mansfield Town	3 January 2015	
14 October 2014	42	MF	(Canada) Michael Petrasso	(England) Notts County	10 January 2015	
24 October 2014	–	MF	(Wales) Michael Doughty	(England) Gillingham	24 January 2015	
30 October 2014	–	MF	(Republic of Ireland) Frankie Sutherland (Note: Sutherland was born in Hillingdon, England, but also qualifies to represent the Republic of Ireland internationally through his grandmother and represented them at U-17, U-19, and U-21 level.)	(England) Wimbledon	6 January 2015	
7 November 2014	–	GK	(England) Joe Lumley	(England) Morecambe	8 December 2014	
20 November 2014	–	DF	(England) Cole Kpekawa	(England) Colchester United	20 December 2014	
26 November 2014	28	DF	(Germany) Max Ehmer	(England) Gillingham	30 June 2015	
2 February 2015	–	MF	(Portugal) Bruno Andrade	(England) Stevenage	31 March 2015	
19 March 2015	–	DF	(England) Cole Kpekawa	(England) Portsmouth	30 June 2015	

== Season statistics ==
=== August ===
QPR Started their season with a 0–1 loss to Hull City at home, after James Chester headed in a corner early in the second half. On 21 August 2014 QPR announced the season long loan signing of Chilean international Eduardo Vargas. On 24 August 2014 QPR lost 4-0 to Tottenham leaving them bottom of the table. Just three days after Rangers lost surprisingly to League 2 side Burton Albion in the League Cup 2nd round. On 30 August 2014 QPR won their first game of the season against Sunderland thanks to a late first half goal from Charlie Austin.

=== September ===
QPR lost 4–0 away to Manchester United on 14 September. On 20 September loan signing Niko Kranjčar scored a late equalizer in a 2–2 draw against Stoke City. Rangers lost away at Southampton on 27 September.

== Friendlies ==
22 July 2014 Friendly	Rot-Weiß Erfurt (Germany)	0–1	Queens Park Rangers	Gera, Germany
19:30 CEST		Report	Austin 22'	Stadium: Steigerwaldstadion; Attendance: 2,127

26 July 2014 Friendly	RB Leipzig (Germany)	2–0	Queens Park Rangers	Gera, Germany
14:30 CEST	Poulsen 62', 73'	Report		Stadium: Stadion der Freundschaft; Attendance: 2,950

29 July 2014 Friendly	Leyton Orient	2–2	Queens Park Rangers	London
19:45 BST	Vincelot 9'; Cox 81'	Report	Hoilett 19'; Barton 46'	Stadium: Brisbane Road; Attendance: 2,996

30 July 2014 Friendly	Southend United	0–0	Queens Park Rangers	Southend
19:45 BST		Report		Stadium: Roots Hall; Attendance: 3,193

2 August 2014 Friendly	Shamrock Rovers (Republic of Ireland)	0–4	Queens Park Rangers	Dublin, Ireland
15:00 BST		Report	Hoilett 16', 90'; Austin 34', 90+2'	Stadium: Tallaght Stadium; Attendance: 2,500

5 August 2014 Friendly	Athlone Town (Republic of Ireland)	0–2	Queens Park Rangers	Athlone, Ireland
18:00 BST		Report	Zamora 14'; Austin 55'	Stadium: Athlone Town Stadium; Attendance: 2,800

9 August 2014 Friendly	Queens Park Rangers	0–1	PAOK (Greece)	London
15:00 BST		Report	Hill 66' (o.g.)	Stadium: Loftus Road; Attendance: 4,686

10 October 2014 Friendly	Queens Park Rangers	2–0	Wolverhampton Wanderers	Harlington, London
	Phillips 8', 89'	Report		Stadium: Harilngton Training Ground

Date	Opponents	
13-Nov-14	Queens Park Rangers v Millwall	Private
18-Nov-14	Queens Park Rangers v Brighton & Hove Albion	Private
22-Dec-14	Queens Park Rangers v Southend United	Private
22-Jan-15	Queens Park Rangers v Millwall	Private
27-Mar-15	Queens Park Rangers v Swindon Town	Private
28-Apr-15	Queens Park Rangers v Barnet	Private
6-May-15	Queens Park Rangers v Norwich City	Private

== Competitions ==
=== Barclays Premier League ===
==== League table ====
Pos	Team	Pld	W	D	L	GF	GA	GD	Pts	Qualification or relegation
16	Sunderland	38	7	17	14	31	53	−22	38	
17	Aston Villa	38	10	8	20	31	57	−26	38	
18	Hull City (R)	38	8	11	19	33	51	−18	35	Relegation to Football League Championship
19	Burnley (R)	38	7	12	19	28	53	−25	33	Relegation to Football League Championship
20	Queens Park Rangers (R)	38	8	6	24	42	73	−31	30	Relegation to Football League Championship

Source: Barclays Premier League
Rules for classification: 1) Points; 2) Goal difference; 3) Goals scored; 4) Play-offs (only if needed to decide champion, teams for relegation or teams for UEFA competitions).
(R) Relegated

==== Results summary ====
Overall								Home						Away					
Pld	W	D	L	GF	GA	GD	Pts	W	D	L	GF	GA	GD	W	D	L	GF	GA	GD
38	8	6	24	42	73	−31	30	6	5	8	23	24	−1	2	1	16	19	49	−30

Last updated: 25 May 2015.
Source: QPR.CO.UK

==== Results by matchday ====
Matchday	1	2	3	4	5	6	7	8	9	10	11	12	13	14	15	16	17	18	19	20	21	22	23	24	25	26	27	28	29	30	31	32	33	34	35	36	37	38
Ground	H	A	H	A	H	A	A	H	H	A	H	A	H	A	H	A	H	A	H	H	A	H	A	H	A	A	H	H	A	H	A	A	H	H	A	A	H	A
Result	L	L	W	L	D	L	L	L	W	L	D	L	W	L	W	L	W	L	D	D	L	L	L	L	W	L	L	L	L	L	W	D	L	D	L	L	W	L
Position	18	20	12	16	16	18	20	20	19	19	19	20	18	19	17	18	15	16	15	16	19	19	19	19	17	17	18	18	19	19	18	18	18	19	19	20	20	20
Points	0	0	3	3	4	4	4	4	7	7	8	8	11	11	14	14	17	17	18	19	19	19	19	19	22	22	22	22	22	22	25	26	26	27	27	27	30	30

Updated to match(es) played on 25 May 2015. Source: statto.com
A = Away; H = Home; W = Win; D = Draw; L = Loss

==== Matches ====
16 August 2014 1	Queens Park Rangers	0–1	Hull City	Shepherd's Bush
15:00 BST	Dunne (yellow card) 69'	Report	Davies (yellow card) 27'; Chester 52'; Jelavić (yellow card) 79'	Stadium: Loftus Road; Attendance: 17,603; Referee: Craig Pawson

24 August 2014 2	Tottenham Hotspur	4–0	Queens Park Rangers	Tottenham
13:30 BST	Chadli 12', 37'; Dier 30'; Adebayor 65'	Report	Fer (yellow card) 64'	Stadium: White Hart Lane; Attendance: 36,109; Referee: Anthony Taylor

30 August 2014 3	Queens Park Rangers	1–0	Sunderland	Shepherd's Bush
15:00 BST	Austin 45+2'; Mutch (yellow card) 57'	Report	Cattermole (yellow card) 37'; Giaccherini (yellow card) 90+2'	Stadium: Loftus Road; Attendance: 17,930; Referee: Robert Madley

14 September 2014 4	Manchester United	4–0	Queens Park Rangers	Trafford
16:00 BST	Di María 24'; Van Persie (yellow card) 33'; Herrera 36'; Rooney 44'; Mata 58'	Report		Stadium: Old Trafford; Attendance: 75,355; Referee: Phil Dowd

20 September 2014 5	Queens Park Rangers	2–2	Stoke City	Shepherd's Bush
12:45 BST	Caulker 42'; Traoré (yellow card) 74'; Fer (yellow card) 85'; Kranjčar 88'	Report	Diouf 11', (yellow card) 81'; Pieters (yellow card) 45+2'; Crouch 51'; Shawcross (yellow card) 84'; Sidwell (yellow card) 88'	Stadium: Loftus Road; Attendance: 16,163; Referee: Martin Atkinson

27 September 2014 6	Southampton	2–1	Queens Park Rangers	Southampton
15:00 BST	Clyne (yellow card) 26'; Mané (yellow card) 33'; Bertrand 55'; Pellè 68'	Report	Henry (yellow card) 30'; Austin 66'	Stadium: St Mary's Stadium; Attendance: 30,504; Referee: Mark Clattenburg

5 October 2014 7	West Ham United	2–0	Queens Park Rangers	Upton Park
16:15 BST	Onuoha 5' (o.g.); Tomkins (yellow card) 49'; Sakho 59'; Cresswell (yellow card) 83'	Report	Sandro (yellow card) 14'; Henry (yellow card) 89'	Stadium: Boleyn Ground; Attendance: 34,907; Referee: Anthony Taylor

19 October 2014 8	Queens Park Rangers	2–3	Liverpool	Shepherd's Bush
13:30 BST	Dunne (yellow card) 45+1'; Henry (yellow card) 80'; Vargas 87'; Gerrard 90+2' (o.g.)	Report	Dunne 67' (o.g.); Johnson (yellow card) 71'; Škrtel (yellow card) 82'; Coutinho (yellow card) 86', (goal) 90'; Caulker 90+5' (o.g.)	Stadium: Loftus Road; Attendance: 18,069; Referee: Phil Dowd

27 October 2014 9	Queens Park Rangers	2–0	Aston Villa	Shepherd's Bush
20:00 GMT	Austin 17', 69'	Report	Weimann (yellow card) 58'; Lowton (yellow card) 77'	Stadium: Loftus Road; Attendance: 18,022; Referee: Lee Mason

1 November 2014 10	Chelsea	2–1	Queens Park Rangers	Fulham
15:00 GMT	Oscar 32'; Hazard 75' (pen.)	Report	Austin 62'	Stadium: Stamford Bridge; Attendance: 41,486; Referee: Mike Jones

8 November 2014 11	Queens Park Rangers	2–2	Manchester City	Shepherd's Bush
17:30 GMT	Sandro (yellow card) 19'; Austin 21'; Isla (yellow card) 37'; Dunne (yellow card) 40'; Vargas (yellow card) 40+2'; Demichelis 77' (o.g.)	Report	Agüero 32', 83'; Nasri (yellow card) 45+3'; Sagna (yellow card) 55'	Stadium: Loftus Road; Attendance: 18,005; Referee: Mike Dean

22 November 2014 12	Newcastle United	1–0	Queens Park Rangers	Newcastle upon Tyne
12:00 GMT	Sissoko (yellow card) 58' (goal) 78'; Armstrong (yellow card) 90+1'	Report	Onuoha (yellow card) 41'; Dunne (yellow card) 73'; Zamora (yellow card) 90'	Stadium: St James' Park; Attendance: 51,915; Referee: Chris Foy

29 November 2014 13	Queens Park Rangers	3–2	Leicester City	Shepherd's Bush
15:00 GMT	Morgan 37' (o.g.); Yun (yellow card) 44'; Fer 45'; Austin 73', (yellow card) 77'; Green (yellow card) 90+5'	Report	Cambiasso 4'; Schlupp 67'; Nugent (yellow card) 90+3'; Albrighton (yellow card) 90+5'	Stadium: Loftus Road; Attendance: 18,054; Referee: Roger East

2 December 2014 14	Swansea City	2–0	Queens Park Rangers	Swansea
19:45 GMT	Taylor (yellow card) 71'; Britton (yellow card) 76'; Ki 78'; Routledge 83'	Report	Barton (yellow card) 36'; Fer (yellow card) 57'	Stadium: Liberty Stadium; Attendance: 20,145; Referee: Kevin Friend

6 December 2014 15	Queens Park Rangers	2–0	Burnley	Shepherd's Bush
15:00 GMT	Fer (yellow card) 45', (goal) 51'; Austin 74', (yellow card) 73' (yellow-red card) 76'	Report	Barnes (yellow card) 48'	Stadium: Loftus Road; Attendance: 17,785; Referee: Jonathan Moss

15 December 2014 16	Everton	3–1	Queens Park Rangers	Liverpool
20:00 GMT	Barkley 33'; Mirallas 44'; Naismith 53'; Baines (yellow card) 86'	Report	Zamora 80'; Mutch (yellow card) 89'	Stadium: Goodison Park; Attendance: 34,035; Referee: Neil Swarbrick

20 December 2014 17	Queens Park Rangers	3–2	West Bromwich Albion	Shepherd's Bush
15:00 GMT	Austin 24' (pen.), 48', 86'; Dunne (yellow card) 39'	Report	Lescott 10'; Varela 20'	Stadium: Loftus Road; Attendance: 17,560; Referee: Craig Pawson

26 December 2014 18	Arsenal	2–1	Queens Park Rangers	Holloway
17:30 GMT	Sánchez 37'; Giroud (red card) 53'; Rosický 65'; Coquelin (yellow card) 90'	Report	Ferdinand (yellow card) 27'; Mutch (yellow card) 55'; Hoilett (yellow card) 70'; Austin 79' (pen.); Kranjčar (yellow card) 90'	Stadium: Emirates Stadium; Attendance: 59,947; Referee: Martin Atkinson

28 December 2014 19	Queens Park Rangers	0–0	Crystal Palace	Shepherd's Bush
15:00 GMT	Hill (yellow card) 45'; Barton (yellow card) 62'	Report	Puncheon (yellow card) 72'	Stadium: Loftus Road; Attendance: 18,011; Referee: Mike Jones

1 January 2015 20	Queens Park Rangers	1–1	Swansea City	Shepherd's Bush
15:00 GMT	Fer 20'; Isla (yellow card) 58'; Dunne (yellow card) 62'; Barton (yellow card) 74'; Henry (yellow card) 86'	Report	Routledge (red card) 86'; Bony 90+2'	Stadium: Loftus Road; Attendance: 17,729; Referee: Anthony Taylor

10 January 2015 21	Burnley	2–1	Queens Park Rangers	Burnley
15:00 GMT	Arfield 12'; Ings 37'; Marney (yellow card) 45+2'; Barnes (yellow card) 53'	Report	Austin 33' (pen.); Barton (yellow card) 45'; Traoré (yellow card) 76'	Stadium: Turf Moor; Attendance: 17,523; Referee: Andre Marriner

17 January 2015 22	Queens Park Rangers	0–2	Manchester United	Shepherd's Bush
15:00 GMT	Barton (yellow card) 41'; Isla (yellow card) 60'; Hill (yellow card) 82'	Report	Mata (yellow card) 45'; Fellaini 58'; Rojo (yellow card) 67'; Wilson 90+4'	Stadium: Loftus Road; Attendance: 18,098; Referee: Neil Swarbrick

31 January 2015 23	Stoke City	3–1	Queens Park Rangers	Stoke-on-Trent
15:00 GMT	Walters 21', 34', 90+2' (yellow card) 85'; Moses (yellow card) 58'	Report	Isla (yellow card) 24'; Kranjčar 36'; Barton (yellow card) 68'	Stadium: Britannia Stadium; Attendance: 27,512; Referee: Mike Dean

7 February 2015 24	Queens Park Rangers	0–1	Southampton	Shepherd's Bush
15:00 GMT	Barton (yellow card) 14'; Hill (yellow card) 58'	Report	Schneiderlin (yellow card) 75'; Mané 90+3'; Forster (yellow card) 90+6'	Stadium: Loftus Road; Attendance: 18,082; Referee: Roger East

10 February 2015 25	Sunderland	0–2	Queens Park Rangers	Sunderland
19:45 GMT	Larsson (yellow card) 41'; Álvarez (yellow card) 83'	Report	Fer 17'; Zamora (yellow card) 35', (goal) 45+1'; Ferdinand (yellow card) 70'; Barton (yellow card) 78'	Stadium: Stadium of Light; Attendance: 39,077; Referee: Martin Atkinson

21 February 2015 26	Hull City	2–1	Queens Park Rangers	Kingston upon Hull
15:00 GMT	Jelavić 16'; N'Doye 89'	Report	Furlong (yellow card) 32'; Barton (red card) 32'; Austin 39'; Zamora (yellow card) 58'; Zárate (yellow card) 75'; Phillips (yellow card) 80'	Stadium: KC Stadium; Attendance: 24,466; Referee: Anthony Taylor

4 March 2015 28	Queens Park Rangers	1–2	Arsenal	Shepherd's Bush
19:45 GMT	Henry (yellow card) 32'; Yun (yellow card) 80'; Austin 82'	Report	Bellerín (yellow card) 34'; Giroud 64'; Sánchez 69'	Stadium: Loftus Road; Attendance: 17,977; Referee: Kevin Friend

7 March 2015 27	Queens Park Rangers	1–2	Tottenham Hotspur	Shepherd's Bush
15:00 GMT	Henry (yellow card) 60'; Sandro 75'	Report	Kane 34', 68'	Stadium: Loftus Road; Attendance: 17,992; Referee: Craig Pawson

14 March 2015 29	Crystal Palace	3–1	Queens Park Rangers	Selhurst
12:45 GMT	Zaha 21'; McArthur 40'; Ward 42'; Murray (yellow card) 59'	Report	Henry (yellow card) 30'; Sandro (yellow card) 53'; Onuoha (yellow card) 76'; Phillips 83'	Stadium: Selhurst Park; Attendance: 24,886; Referee: Lee Mason

22 March 2015 30	Queens Park Rangers	1–2	Everton	Shepherd's Bush
16:00 GMT	Hoilett (yellow card) 39'; Yun (yellow card) 53'; Vargas 65'	Report	Coleman 18'; Lennon 77'; Naismith (yellow card) 90'	Stadium: Loftus Road; Attendance: 17,706; Referee: Jonathan Moss

4 April 2015 31	West Bromwich Albion	1–4	Queens Park Rangers	West Bromwich
14:00 GMT	Sessègnon (yellow card) 45'; Anichebe 58'; Mulumbu (red card) 84'; Brunt (yellow card) 90'	Report	Vargas 15'; Caulker (yellow card) 23'; Austin 37'; Zamora 43'; Barton (yellow card) 74', (goal) 90'; Henry (yellow card) 90'	Stadium: The Hawthorns; Attendance: 25,735; Referee: Lee Probert

7 April 2015 33	Aston Villa	3–3	Queens Park Rangers	Birmingham
18:45 GMT	Benteke 10', 33', 83'	Report	Phillips 7'; Sandro (yellow card) 34'; Kranjčar (yellow card) 35'; Hill 55', (yellow card) 82'; Austin (yellow card) 57', (goal) 78'	Stadium: Villa Park; Attendance: 33,708; Referee: Craig Pawson

12 April 2015 32	Queens Park Rangers	0–1	Chelsea	Shepherd's Bush
12:30 GMT	Zamora (yellow card) 75'; Sandro (yellow card) 78'	Report	Drogba (yellow card) 60'; Fàbregas 88'	Stadium: Loftus Road; Attendance: 17,939; Referee: Andre Marriner

25 April 2015 34	Queens Park Rangers	0–0	West Ham United	Shepherd's Bush
14:00 GMT	Austin (yellow card) 77'	Report		Stadium: Loftus Road; Attendance: 18,036; Referee: Mike Jones

2 May 2015 35	Liverpool	2–1	Queens Park Rangers	Liverpool
15:00 BST	Gerrard (yellow card) 18', (goal) 87'; Coutinho 19'; Lovren (yellow card) 75'	Report	Sandro (yellow card) 43'; Fer 73'; Dunne (yellow card) 76'; Onuoha (yellow card) 79' (yellow-red card) 82'; Austin (yellow card) 90+3'	Stadium: Anfield; Attendance: 44,707; Referee: Martin Atkinson

10 May 2015 36	Manchester City	6–0	Queens Park Rangers	Manchester
13:30 BST	Agüero 4', 50', 65' (pen.); Kolarov 32'; Milner 70'; Silva 87'	Report	Barton (yellow card) 62'	Stadium: Etihad Stadium; Attendance: 44,564; Referee: Mike Dean

16 May 2015 37	Queens Park Rangers	2–1	Newcastle United	Shepherd's Bush
15:00 BST	Barton (yellow card) 50'; Phillips 54'; Fer 61'; Yun (yellow card) 85'	Report	Rivière 24'	Stadium: Loftus Road; Attendance: 17,608; Referee: Lee Probert

24 May 2015 38	Leicester City	5–1	Queens Park Rangers	Leicester
15:00 BST	Vardy 16'; Albrighton 43'; Ulloa 51'; Cambiasso 52'; Kramarić 86'	Report	Austin 57'	Stadium: King Power Stadium; Attendance: 31,467; Referee: Michael Oliver

=== FA Cup ===
4 January 2015 Third Round	Queens Park Rangers	0–3	Sheffield United	Shepherd's Bush
13:00 GMT	Onuoha (yellow card) 66'	Report	McNulty 36' (yellow card) 69'; Campbell-Ryce 49', 90+4'; Reed (yellow card) 80'	Stadium: Loftus Road; Attendance: 12,972; Referee: Mark Clattenburg

=== Capital One Cup ===
27 August 2014 Second round	Burton Albion	1–0	Queens Park Rangers	Burton-upon-Trent
19:45 BST	MacDonald (yellow card) 27'; Mousinho (yellow card) 35'; McGurk 77'	Report	Simpson (yellow card) 54'; Dunne (yellow card) 76'	Stadium: Pirelli Stadium; Attendance: 3,999; Referee: Paul Tierney

== Squad statistics ==
=== Statistics ===
As of 24 May 2015

No.	Pos	Nat	Player	Total		Barclays Premier League		FA Cup		Capital One Cup	
No.	Pos	Nat	Player	Apps	Goals	Apps	Goals	Apps	Goals	Apps	Goals
1	GK	(England) ENG	Robert Green	38	0	38	0	0	0	0	0
2	DF	(England) ENG	Danny Simpson †	2	0	1	0	0	0	1	0
3	DF	(Senegal) SEN	Armand Traoré	17	0	7+9	0	1	0	0	0
4	DF	(England) ENG	Steven Caulker	36	1	34+1	1	1	0	0	0
5	DF	(England) ENG	Rio Ferdinand	12	0	11	0	1	0	0	0
6	DF	(England) ENG	Clint Hill	20	1	15+4	1	0	0	1	0
7	MF	(Scotland) SCO	Matt Phillips	27	3	20+5	3	1	0	1	0
8	MF	(England) ENG	Joey Barton	28	1	27+1	1	0	0	0	0
9	FW	(England) ENG	Charlie Austin	36	18	35	18	1	0	0	0
10	MF	(Netherlands) NED	Leroy Fer	31	6	27+2	6	1	0	0+1	0
11	MF	(England) ENG	Shaun Wright-Phillips	5	0	1+3	0	0	0	1	0
12	GK	(England) ENG	Alex McCarthy	4	0	2+1	0	1	0	0	0
13	DF	(South Korea) KOR	Yun Suk-young	23	0	19+4	0	0	0	0	0
14	MF	(Chile) CHI	Mauricio Isla	27	0	24+2	0	0+1	0	0	0
15	DF	(England) ENG	Nedum Onuoha	25	0	22+1	0	1	0	1	0
17	MF	(England) ENG	Jordon Mutch †	11	0	6+3	0	1	0	0+1	0
17	MF	(Republic of Ireland) IRL	Frankie Sutherland	0	0	0	0	0	0	0	0
18	MF	(Argentina) ARG	Alejandro Faurlín	3	0	1+1	0	0	0	1	0
19	FW	(France) FRA	Loïc Rémy †	2	0	2	0	0	0	0	0
19	MF	(Croatia) CRO	Niko Kranjčar	22	2	11+11	2	0	0	0	0
20	MF	(England) ENG	Karl Henry	35	0	27+6	0	1	0	1	0
21	GK	(Republic of Ireland) IRL	Brian Murphy	1	0	0	0	0	0	1	0
22	DF	(Republic of Ireland) IRL	Richard Dunne	24	0	22+1	0	0	0	1	0
23	MF	(Canada) CAN	Junior Hoilett	24	0	9+13	0	1	0	1	0
24	MF	(Chile) CHI	Eduardo Vargas	22	3	16+5	3	0+1	0	0	0
25	FW	(England) ENG	Bobby Zamora	33	3	19+12	3	0+1	0	0+1	0
27	MF	(Morocco) MAR	Adel Taarabt	8	0	3+4	0	0	0	1	0
29	FW	(Argentina) ARG	Mauro Zárate	4	0	0+4	0	0	0	0	0
30	MF	(Brazil) BRA	Sandro	17	1	17	1	0	0	0	0
34	MF	(England) ENG	Aaron Mitchell	0	0	0	0	0	0	0	0
36	MF	(England) ENG	Michael Doughty	3	0	0+3	0	0	0	0	0
37	MF	(Republic of Ireland) IRL	Michael Harriman	0	0	0	0	0	0	0	0
38	DF	(England) ENG	Darnell Furlong	3	0	3	0	0	0	0	0
39	FW	(Republic of Ireland) IRL	Reece Grego-Cox	4	0	1+3	0	0	0	0	0
41	MF	(Montserrat) MSR	Brandon Comley	1	0	0+1	0	0	0	0	0
42	DF	(England) ENG	Cole Kpekawa	2	0	0+1	0	0+1	0	0	0
45	MF	(Canada) CAN	Michael Petrasso	0	0	0	0	0	0	0	0

† denotes players that left the club during the season.

=== Goals ===
As of 13 May 2015

Rank	Player	Position	Premier League	League Cup	FA Cup	Total
1	(England) Charlie Austin	ST	18	0	0	18
2	(Netherlands) Leroy Fer	CM	6	0	0	6
3	(England) Bobby Zamora	ST	3	0	0	3
3	(Chile) Eduardo Vargas	ST	3	0	0	3
3	(Scotland) Matt Phillips	RM	3	0	0	3
6	(Croatia) Niko Kranjčar	AM	2	0	0	2
7	(England) Steven Caulker	CB	1	0	0	1
7	(Brazil) Sandro	DM	1	0	0	1
7	(England) Joey Barton	DM	1	0	0	1
7	(England) Clint Hill	LB	1	0	0	1
Own goal			3	0	0	3
Total			42	0	0	42

=== Own goals ===
As of 4 April 2015

Rank	Player	Position	Premier League	League Cup	FA Cup	Total
1	(England) Nedum Onuoha	CB	1	0	0	1
1	(Republic of Ireland) Richard Dunne	CB	1	0	0	1
1	(England) Steven Caulker	CB	1	0	0	1
Total			3	0	0	3

=== Discipline ===
N	P	Nat.	Name	Premier League			League Cup			FA Cup			Total			Notes
N	P	Nat.	Name	Yellow card	Second yellow card	Red card	Yellow card	Second yellow card	Red card	Yellow card	Second yellow card	Red card	Yellow card	Second yellow card	Red card	Notes
8	MF	(England)	Joey Barton	10		1							10		1	
20	MF	(England)	Karl Henry	8									8			
22	DF	(Republic of Ireland)	Richard Dunne	6			1						7			
6	DF	(England)	Clint Hill	4									4			
10	MF	(Netherlands)	Leroy Fer	4									4			
14	MF	(Chile)	Mauricio Isla	4									4			
30	MF	(Brazil)	Sandro	4									4			
9	ST	(England)	Charlie Austin	3	1								3	1		
15	DF	(England)	Nedum Onuoha	2						1			3			
17	MF	(England)	Jordon Mutch †	3									3			
25	ST	(England)	Bobby Zamora	3									3			
3	DF	(Senegal)	Armand Traoré	2									2			
5	DF	(England)	Rio Ferdinand	2									2			
13	DF	(South Korea)	Yun Suk-young	2									2			
19	MF	(Croatia)	Niko Kranjčar	2									2			
1	GK	(England)	Robert Green	1									1			
4	DF	(England)	Steven Caulker	1									1			
7	MF	(Scotland)	Matt Phillips	1									1			
23	MF	(Canada)	Junior Hoilett	1									1			
24	ST	(Chile)	Eduardo Vargas	1									1			
29	ST	(Argentina)	Mauro Zárate	1									1			
38	DF	(England)	Darnell Furlong	1									1			
2	DF	(England)	Danny Simpson †				1						1			

Last updated: 7 April 2015
Source: Matches
Ordered by (red card) , (second yellow card) and (yellow card)
(yellow card) = Number of bookings; (second yellow card) = Number of sending offs after a second yellow card; (red card) = Number of sending offs by a direct red card.
