= Samba Diakité =

Footballer (born 1989)

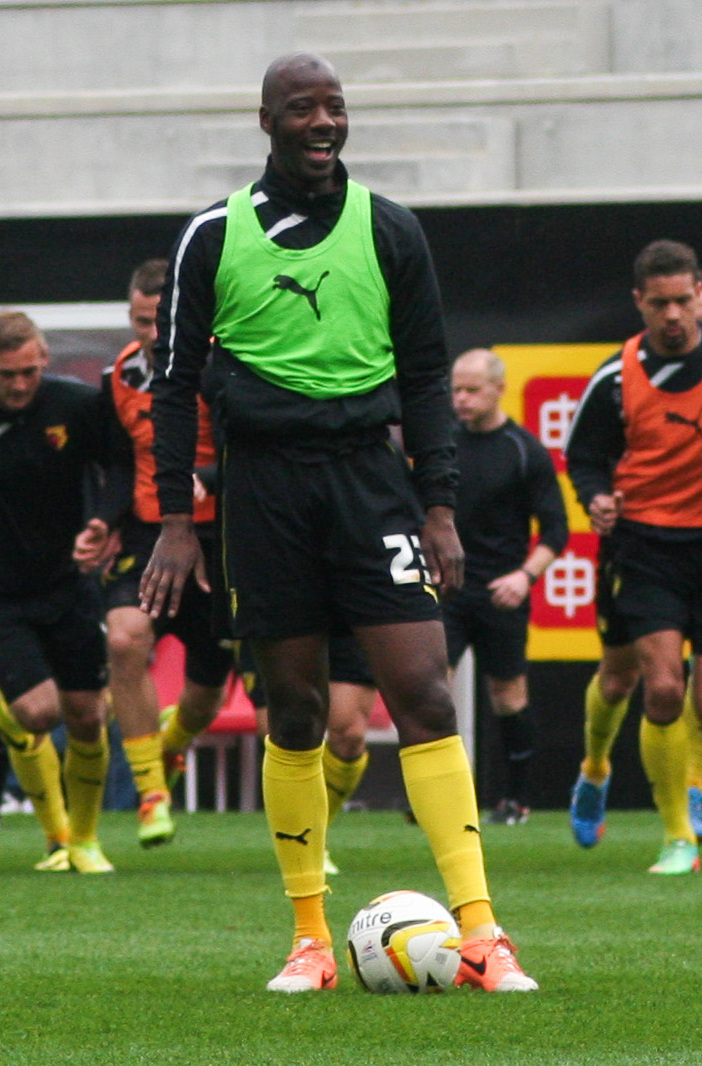
- Diakite with Watford in 2014

Personal information
- Date of birth: 24 January 1989 (age 37)
- Place of birth: Montfermeil, France
- Height: 1.86 m (6 ft 1 in)
- Position: Midfielder

Youth career
- 2003–2005: Le Bourget
- 2005–2007: Torcy
- 2007–2010: Nancy

Senior career*
Years	Team	Apps	(Gls)
2010–2012	Nancy	41	(0)
2012	→ Queens Park Rangers (loan)	9	(1)
2012–2016	Queens Park Rangers	14	(0)
2014	→ Watford (loan)	6	(0)
2014–2015	→ Al-Ittihad (loan)	7	(1)
2016–2019	Red Star	33	(0)
2020	Al Tadhamon		
Total		110	(2)

International career
2012–2013	Mali	9	(0)
- * Club domestic league appearances and goals

Samba Diakité (born 24 January 1989) is a former professional footballer who played as a midfielder. Born in France, between 2012 and 2013 he made nine appearances for the Mali national team.

== Club career ==
=== Early career ===
Diakité played for Le Bourget and Torcy, before joining Nancy in 2007.

=== Nancy ===
On 27 December 2009, he signed his first professional contract after agreeing to a two-year deal with Nancy. He made his professional debut on 27 January 2010 in a Coupe de France match against Plabennec.

==== Queens Park Rangers (loan) ====
On 29 January 2012, he agreed a deal to join Premier League team Queens Park Rangers on loan for the remainder of the season with a view to a permanent switch in the summer of 2012. He made his debut on 25 February 2012 in a 1–0 defeat, at home against Fulham, where he was sent-off after just 33 minutes for a second bookable offence. Diakité scored his first goal, a winning goal, for Queens Park Rangers in a 2–1 victory over London rivals Arsenal on 31 March 2012.

=== Queens Park Rangers ===
On 27 June 2012, it was announced by Queens Park Rangers that they had completed the permanent signing of Diakité on a four-year deal for an undisclosed fee believed to be £3.5 million. Up until his loan move to Watford, he made 14 appearances for the R's that season.

==== Watford (loan) ====
On 31 January 2014, Diakité joined Watford on loan for the remainder of the 2013–14 season.

Diakité made his Watford debut as an 88th-minute substitute for Cristian Battocchio in the 2-0 win over Brighton on 2 February 2014.

However, on his full debut against Middlesbrough on 15 February 2014, Diakité was shown a straight red card early in the second half for a two-footed lunge on Dean Whitehead.

==== Ittihad (loan) ====
On 19 July 2014, Diakité joined Ittihad on a season long loan. He was recalled by Queens Park Rangers at the end of the January transfer window, having made seven appearances and scoring one goal during his time at the Saudi Arabian club.

=== Al Tadhamon ===
In 2020, Diakité joined Kuwaiti club Al Tadhamon SC.

== International career ==
On 24 January 2012, he made his senior international debut for Mali at the 2012 Africa Cup of Nations, in the 1–0 victory against Guinea. In total, he has made nineteen appearances for his country, scoring four goals. His form for his country in the tournament helped them reach the semi-finals, and helped earn him a move to Queens Park Rangers.

== Career statistics ==
=== Club ===
Appearances and goals by club, season and competition
Club	Season	League			National cup		League cup		Other		Total	
Club	Season	Division	Apps	Goals	Apps	Goals	Apps	Goals	Apps	Goals	Apps	Goals
Nancy	2009–10	Ligue 1	3	0	1	0	1	0	—		5	0
Nancy	2010–11	Ligue 1	23	0	1	1	1	1	—		25	2
Nancy	2011–12	Ligue 1	15	0	0	0	1	1	—		16	1
Nancy	Total		41	0	2	1	3	2	—		46	3
Queens Park Rangers (loan)	2011–12	Premier League	9	1	—		—		—		9	1
Queens Park Rangers	2012–13	Premier League	14	0	0	0	1	0	—		15	0
Queens Park Rangers	2013–14	Championship	0	0	0	0	1	0	—		1	0
Queens Park Rangers	2014–15	Premier League	0	0	0	0	0	0	—		0	0
Queens Park Rangers	2015–16	Championship	0	0	0	0	0	0	—		0	0
Queens Park Rangers	Total		14	0	0	0	2	0	—		16	0
Watford (loan)	2013–14	Championship	6	0	—		—		—		6	0
Al-Ittihad (loan)	2014–15	Saudi Pro League	7	1	—		0	0	2 (Note: Appearances in AFC Champions League)	0	9	1
Red Star	2017–18	National	15	0	2	0	1	0	—		18	0
Red Star	2018–19	Ligue 2	18	0	2	0	1	0	—		21	0
Red Star	Total		33	0	4	0	2	0	—		39	0
Al Tadhamon	2019–20	Kuwaiti Premier League					—		—			
Career total			110	2	6	1	7	2	2	0	125	5

=== International ===
Appearances and goals by national team and year
National team	Year	Apps	Goals
Mali	2012	5	0
Mali	2013	4	0
Total		9	0

== Honours ==
Mali

- Africa Cup of Nations bronze: 2013
