= Sandro (footballer, born 1989) =

Brazilian footballer

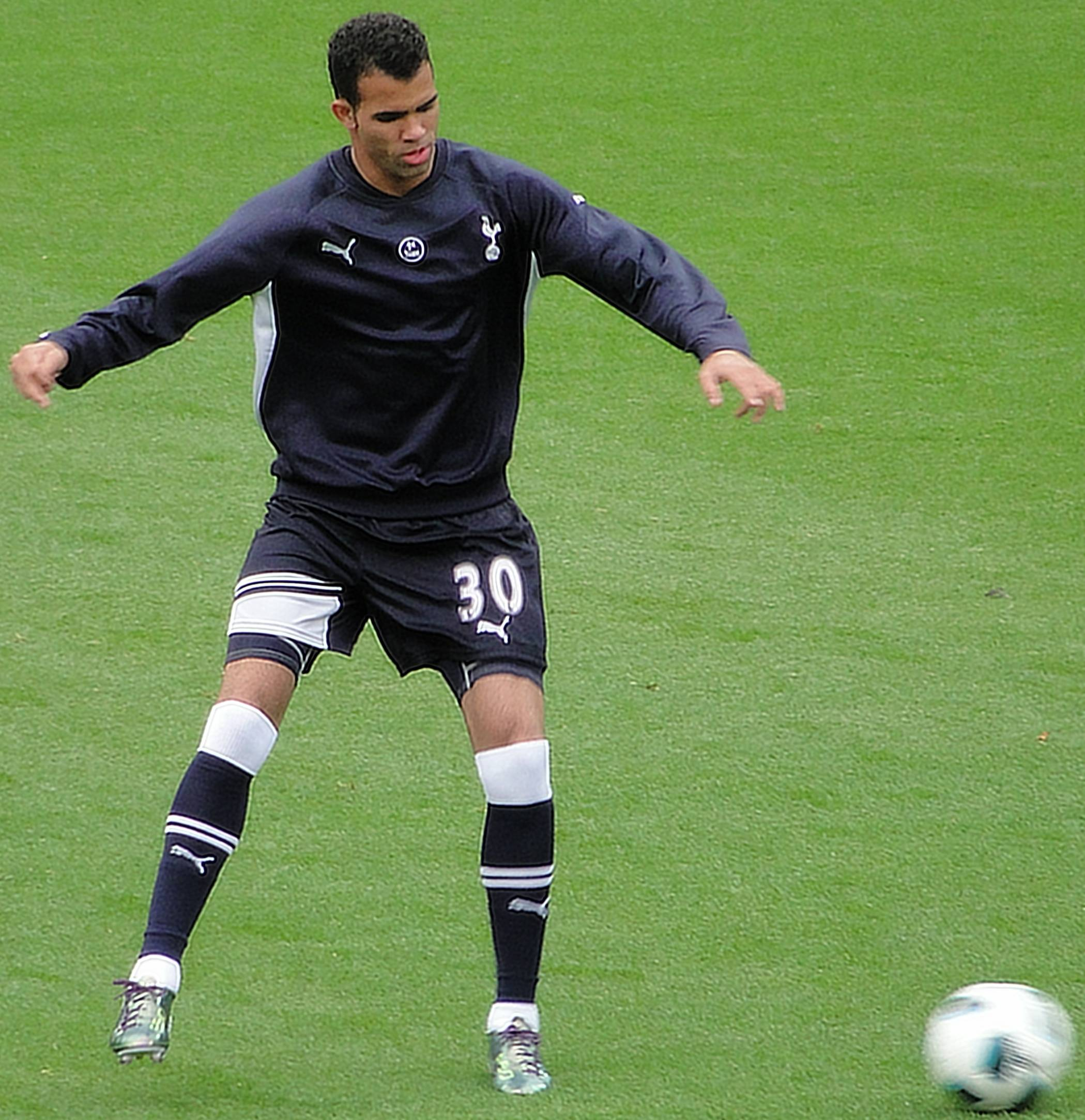
- Sandro warming up for Tottenham Hotspur in 2010

Personal information
- Full name: Sandro Raniere; Guimarães Cordeiro
- Date of birth: 15 March 1989 (age 37)
- Place of birth: Riachinho, Minas Gerais, Brazil
- Height: 1.88 m (6 ft 2 in)
- Position: Defensive midfielder

Youth career
- 2005–2007: Internacional

Senior career*
Years	Team	Apps	(Gls)
2007–2010	Internacional	43	(4)
2010–2014	Tottenham Hotspur	81	(3)
2014–2017	Queens Park Rangers	34	(1)
2016	→ West Bromwich Albion (loan)	12	(0)
2017–2018	Antalyaspor	15	(0)
2018	→ Benevento (loan)	14	(1)
2018–2019	Genoa	13	(0)
2019	→ Udinese (loan)	12	(0)
2020	Goiás	17	(0)
2021–2022	B-SAD	7	(1)
2024–2025	Harborough Town	2	(0)

International career
2009	Brazil U20	8	(1)
2012	Brazil U23	7	(2)
2009–2012	Brazil	17	(1)

Managerial career
- 2026: São João de Ver
Medal record
Representing Brazil
Men's Football
Silver medal – second place	2012 London	Team competition
- * Club domestic league appearances and goals

Sandro Raniere Guimarães Cordeiro (born 15 March 1989), or simply Sandro, is a Brazilian footballer and manager who was most recently head coach of Liga 3 side São João de Ver.

== Club career ==
=== Early career ===
Sandro is a product of Internacional's youth academy. He signed his first professional contract and began his senior career in 2007 as an 18-year-old.

Sandro was one of the main players of Inter's winning 2010 Copa Libertadores campaign. Sandro was already signed to Tottenham through most of the competition, but that did not affect his performance negatively: on the contrary, he said he "live[d] with great intensity, as each game could be the last". With this in mind, he worked hard to stay at Internacional as long as possible in order to help the team reach the finals. After winning South America's top trophy, he flew to England the following week.

=== Tottenham Hotspur ===
In August 2009 Tottenham Hotspur were reported to have had a £14 million bid rejected for the player. However, on 20 October 2009, Spurs and Internacional agreed an affiliation of the two clubs, ensuring that Tottenham have first option on all academy players from the Brazilian outfit. Six days later Tottenham manager Harry Redknapp confirmed he was interested in Sandro for a fee rumoured to be around £8 million.

On 10 March 2010, Internacional President Vitorio Piffero confirmed the transfer of the midfielder to Tottenham, after the Copa Libertadores. The transfer amount was speculated to be around €10 million, with only the contract yet to be signed.

Both Internacional and Tottenham reported on their respective websites that a deal had been agreed for Sandro for an undisclosed fee. Sandro joined Tottenham following the end of the Copa Libertadores, which finished on 18 August. Internacional's financial report stated that the fee was R$ 20,633,850, with about 25% re-distributed by Inter to third party owners.

Tottenham Hotspur confirmed that a deal for Sandro had been completed and that he would join up at the end of Internacional's Copa Libertadores campaign. Sandro said of the move to England that he thought Spurs were "a great fit for me" and that "a club that is growing every year makes it the ideal club for me". He made his Tottenham debut in a 4–1 home defeat against Arsenal in the third round of the League Cup on 21 September 2010.

On 9 January 2011, Sandro made a start against League One side Charlton Athletic, assisting Andros Townsend and playing the full match. He made his UEFA Champions League debut for Tottenham on 15 February 2011 at the San Siro against seven times winners A.C. Milan, receiving special praise from manager Harry Redknapp in his side's 1–0 win. Playing a pivotal role just in front of the back four, he was man of the match in the return leg at White Hart Lane. He scored his first goal for the club against Chelsea with a 35-yard volley in a 2–1 defeat.

Sandro signed a new five-year contract with Tottenham on 8 September 2011, a deal which would have run till 2016.

In January 2013, Sandro picked up a knee injury during the game against Queens Park Rangers. After the game it was announced that Sandro would be out for the remainder of the 2012–13 season. Prior to the game, after a run of impressive performances Sandro has been affectionately nicknamed 'Beast' by the Tottenham fans.

He scored his third goal in Tottenham colours in December 2013 against Manchester United, with a powerful shot from 25 yards (23 m) into the top corner described by opponent Wayne Rooney as "a great strike".

=== Queens Park Rangers ===
On 1 September 2014, Sandro signed for Queens Park Rangers for an undisclosed fee. He made his debut against Manchester United, coming off injured and replaced by Karl Henry. He scored his first goal for QPR against former club Tottenham on 7 March 2015.

On 29 January 2016, Sandro signed for West Brom on loan. He made his debut in the 1–1 draw with Swansea City.

=== Antalyaspor ===
On 11 January 2017, Sandro signed for Turkish club Antalyaspor on a three-year deal. On 10 January 2018, Sandro signed with a loan contract with Benevento until 30 June 2018. He made his debut on 28 January 2018 in 3–0 away loss against Torino. He scored his first goal for Benevento during his 4th match by scoring the 1-1 goal in a 3–2 home win against Crotone.

=== Genoa ===
On 3 July 2018, Sandro signed a contract with Italian club Genoa. His contract with Genoa was terminated in early 2020 after he didn't appear in any games for the club in the first half of the 2019–20 season.

=== Udinese ===
On 31 January 2019, Sandro joined Udinese on loan for the remainder of the 2018–19 season.

=== Goiás ===
On 18 January 2020, he joined Goiás.

=== Retirement ===
On 4 September 2023, Sandro announced his retirement from professional football.

=== Harborough Town ===
On 5 November 2024, Harborough Town of the Southern League Premier Central announced that Sandro had signed a contract with the club. He was convinced by Harborough manager Mitch Austin after meeting him at a Tottenham Hotspur game and was jokingly offered a chance to play for the club. Sandro agreed to play for free. He made his debut in the second round proper of the FA Cup, playing 46 minutes in a 5–3 extra time loss against Reading.

== International career ==
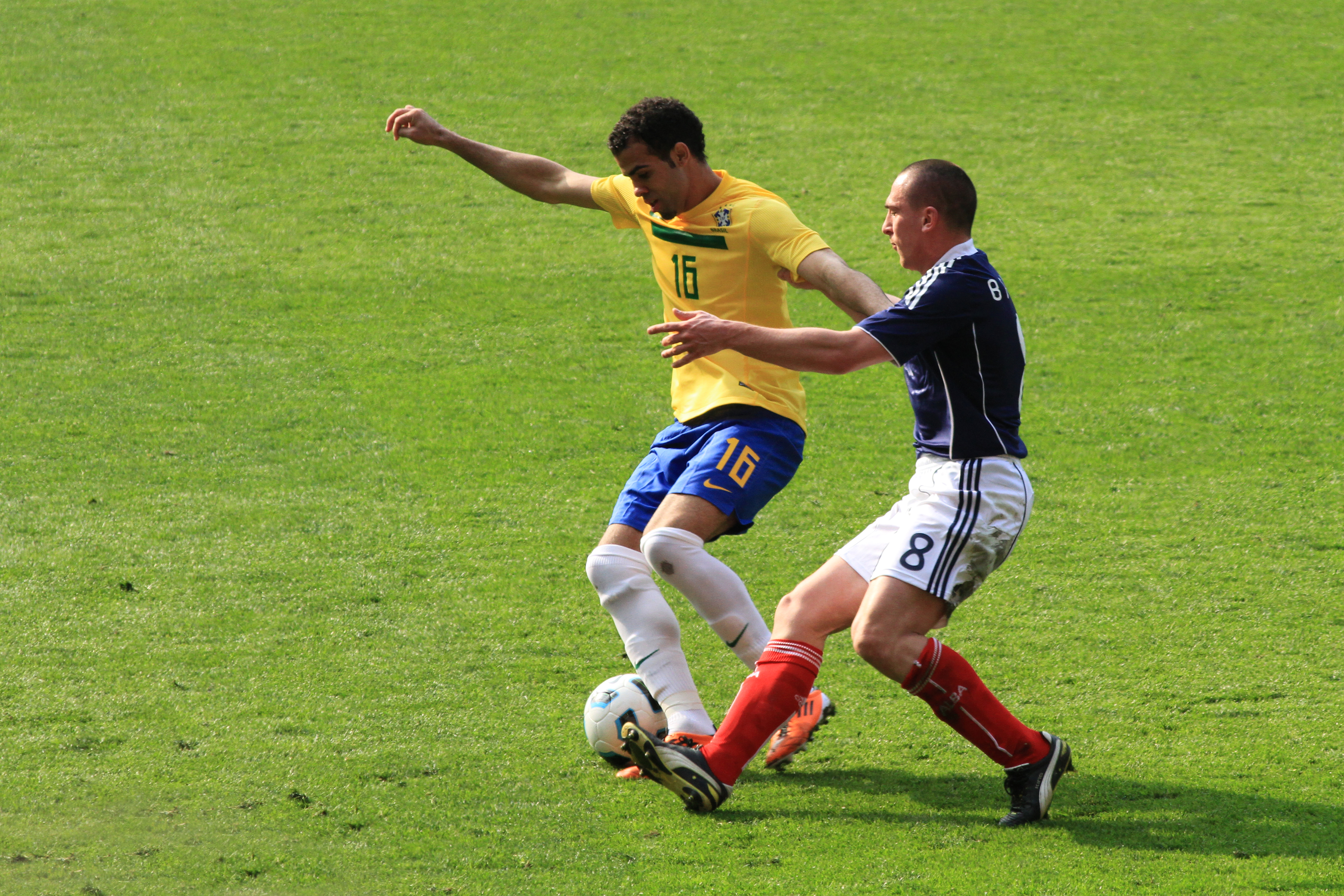
Sandro playing for Brazil in a friendly against Scotland in March 2011

Having represented Brazil at Under-20 level, and captaining them at the 2009 South American Youth Championship, Sandro made his full debut for the Brazil national team as a substitute in a World Cup qualifier against Chile on 9 September 2009. He was named as 1 of 7 back-up players to the 2010 FIFA World Cup squad.

== Personal life ==
During his time in England, Sandro became interested in darts, and recorded a video with professional player Bobby George.

== Career statistics ==
=== Club ===
As of match played 16 September 2020

Club	Season	League			Cup		League Cup		Continental		Other		Total	
Club	Season	Division	Apps	Goals	Apps	Goals	Apps	Goals	Apps	Goals	Apps	Goals	Apps	Goals
Internacional	2008	Série A	7	2	0	0	—		4	0	0	0	11	2
Internacional	2009	Série A	27	1	5	0	—		2	0	14	0	48	1
Internacional	2010	Série A	9	1	0	0	—		14	0	13	0	36	1
Internacional	Total		43	4	5	0	0	0	20	0	27	0	95	4
Tottenham Hotspur	2010–11	Premier League	19	1	2	0	1	0	4	0	—		26	1
Tottenham Hotspur	2011–12	Premier League	23	0	1	0	1	0	2	0	—		27	0
Tottenham Hotspur	2012–13	Premier League	22	1	0	0	0	0	5	0	—		27	1
Tottenham Hotspur	2013–14	Premier League	17	1	0	0	1	0	7	0	—		25	1
Tottenham Hotspur	2014–15	Premier League	0	0	0	0	0	0	1	0	—		1	0
Tottenham Hotspur	Total		81	3	3	0	3	0	19	0	0	0	106	3
Queens Park Rangers	2014–15	Premier League	17	1	0	0	0	0	—		—		17	1
Queens Park Rangers	2015–16	Championship	11	0	0	0	0	0	—		—		11	0
Queens Park Rangers	2016–17	Championship	6	0	0	0	2	3	—		—		8	3
Queens Park Rangers	Total		34	1	0	0	2	3	0	0	0	0	36	4
West Bromwich Albion (loan)	2015–16	Premier League	12	0	1	0	—		0	0	0	0	13	0
Antalyaspor	2016–17	Süper Lig	12	0	0	0	—		—		—		12	0
Antalyaspor	2017–18	Süper Lig	3	0	1	0	—		—		—		4	0
Antalyaspor	Total		15	0	1	0	0	0	0	0	0	0	16	0
Benevento (loan)	2017–18	Serie A	14	1	0	0	—		—		—		14	1
Genoa	2018–19	Serie A	13	0	1	0	—		—		—		14	0
Udinese (loan)	2018–19	Serie A	12	0	—		—		—		—		12	0
Goiás	2020	Série A	5	0	2	0	—		0	0	5	0	12	0
Harborough Town	2024–25	Southern League Premier Division Central	2	0	1	0	—		—		0	0	0	0
Career Total			231	9	14	0	5	3	39	0	32	0	319	12

=== International ===
As of 5 September 2015

National team	Year	Major competition			Friendlies		Total	
National team	Year	Tournament	Apps	Goals	Apps	Goals	Apps	Goals
Brazil U-23	2012	2012 Men's Olympic Football	6	1	0	0	6	1
Brazil	2009	2010 WC Qualifier	1	0	0	0	1	0
Brazil	2010	-	0	0	2	0	2	0
Brazil	2011	2011 Copa América (Note: Player was part of the squad but has not played on any matches)	0	0	5	1	5	1
Brazil	2012	-	0	0	9	0	9	0
Brazil	Total		1	0	16	1	17	1

== Honours ==
Internacional

- Copa Libertadores: 2010

Brazil

- Olympic Silver Medal: 2012
