= 2010–11 Tottenham Hotspur F.C. season =

English football club season

Tottenham Hotspur F.C.
2010–11 season
- Owner: ENIC International Ltd.
- Chairman: Daniel Levy
- Manager: Harry Redknapp
- Stadium: White Hart Lane
- Premier League: 5th
- FA Cup: Fourth round
- League Cup: Third round
- UEFA Champions League: Quarter-finals
- Top goalscorer: League: Rafael van der Vaart (13); All: Rafael van der Vaart (15)
- Highest home attendance: 36,197 vs. Bolton Wanderers (5 February 2011, Premier League)
- Lowest home attendance: 32,518 vs. Twente (24 September 2010, UEFA Champions League)
| Home colours | Away colours | Third colours |

The 2010–11 season was Tottenham Hotspur Football Club's 19th season in the Premier League. It was their 33rd successive season in the top division of the English football league system.

The campaign featured Tottenham's first ever involvement in the UEFA Champions League, with the club entering via the play-off round after finishing fourth in the 2009–10 season. The club reached the quarter-finals of the competition where they were defeated by Real Madrid.

== First-team squad ==
Note: Flags indicate national team as defined under FIFA eligibility rules; some limited exceptions apply. Players may hold more than one non-FIFA nationality.

| No. | Pos. | Nation | Player |
|---|---|---|---|
| 1 | GK | BRA | Heurelho Gomes |
| 2 | DF | SCO | Alan Hutton |
| 3 | MF | WAL | Gareth Bale |
| 4 | DF | FRA | Younès Kaboul |
| 6 | MF | ENG | Tom Huddlestone |
| 7 | MF | ENG | Aaron Lennon |
| 8 | MF | ENG | Jermaine Jenas |
| 9 | FW | RUS | Roman Pavlyuchenko |
| 11 | MF | NED | Rafael van der Vaart |
| 12 | MF | HON | Wilson Palacios |
| 13 | DF | FRA | William Gallas |
| 14 | MF | CRO | Luka Modrić |
| 15 | FW | ENG | Peter Crouch |
| 18 | FW | ENG | Jermain Defoe |

| No. | Pos. | Nation | Player |
|---|---|---|---|
| 19 | DF | CMR | Sébastien Bassong |
| 20 | DF | ENG | Michael Dawson (team captain) |
| 21 | MF | CRO | Niko Kranjčar |
| 22 | DF | CRO | Vedran Ćorluka |
| 23 | GK | ITA | Carlo Cudicini |
| 26 | DF | ENG | Ledley King (club captain) |
| 27 | GK | ENG | Ben Alnwick |
| 30 | MF | BRA | Sandro |
| 31 | MF | ENG | Andros Townsend |
| 32 | DF | CMR | Benoît Assou-Ekotto |
| 36 | DF | RSA | Bongani Khumalo |
| 37 | GK | CRO | Stipe Pletikosa (On loan from Spartak Moscow) |
| 39 | DF | ENG | Jonathan Woodgate |
| 40 | MF | RSA | Steven Pienaar |

== Transfers ==
=== In ===
| Date | Player | Previous club | Cost |
|---|---|---|---|
| 1 June 2010 | (Brazil) Sandro | Internacional |
| 22 August 2010 | (France) William Gallas | Arsenal | Free |
| 31 August 2010 | (Netherlands) Rafael van der Vaart | Real Madrid | £8M |
| 7 January 2011 | (South Africa) Bongani Khumalo | Supersport United | £1.5M |
| 18 January 2011 | (South Africa) Steven Pienaar | Everton | £3M |
| | | | Total |
| | | | £18.5 million + |

=== Out ===
| Date | Player | New Club | Cost |
|---|---|---|---|
| 25 May 2010 | (England) Lee Butcher | Leyton Orient | Free |
| 22 June 2010 | (England) Sam Cox | Barnet | Free |
| 30 June 2010 | (England) Jimmy Walker | Walsall | Free |
| 5 August 2010 | (Morocco) Adel Taarabt | QPR | £1M |
| 18 August 2010 | (France) Dorian Dervite | Villarreal | Undisclosed |
| | | | Total |
| | | | £1 million + |

=== Loaned in ===
| Date | Player | Club | Return Date |
|---|---|---|---|
| 30 August 2010 | (Croatia) Stipe Pletikosa | Spartak Moscow | End of 2010–11 Season |

=== Completed loans ===
| Date | Player | Club | Return Date |
|---|---|---|---|
| 5 August 2010 | (Sweden) Oscar Jansson | Northampton Town | 5 September 2010 |
| 13 August 2010 | (England) Ryan Mason | Doncaster Rovers | 10 September 2010 |
| 12 August 2010 | (England) Dean Parrett | Plymouth Argyle | 9 November 2010 |
| 16 October 2010 | (England) Ben Alnwick | Leeds United | 15 November 2010 |
| 12 August 2010 | (England) Andros Townsend | Ipswich Town | 20 December 2010 |
| 6 August 2010 | (England) John Bostock | Hull City | 30 December 2010 |
| 13 September 2010 | (England) Kyle Walker | QPR | 3 January 2011 |
| 20 August 2010 | (England) Jon Obika | Crystal Palace | 7 January 2011 |
| 26 September 2010 | (England) Steven Caulker | Bristol City | 10 January 2011 |
| 3 August 2010 | (England) David Button | Plymouth Argyle | End of 2010–11 Season |
| 9 September 2010 | (England) Danny Rose | Bristol City | End of 2010–11 Season |
| 23 September 2010 | (England) Jake Livermore | Ipswich Town | 1 January 2011 |
| 23 September 2010 | (England) Adam Smith | AFC Bournemouth | End of 2010–11 Season |
| 24 September 2010 | (Belgium) Paul-José M'Poku | Leyton Orient | End of 2010–11 Season |
| 14 October 2010 | (England) Kyle Naughton | Leicester City | End of 2010–11 Season |
| 6 January 2011 | (England) Kyle Walker | Aston Villa | End of 2010–11 Season |
| 7 January 2011 | (England) Jon Obika | Peterborough United | End of 2010–11 Season |
| 7 January 2011 | (England) Harry Kane | Leyton Orient | End of 2010–11 Season |
| 12 January 2011 | (England) David Bentley | Birmingham City | End of 2010–11 Season |
| 20 January 2011 | (England) Andros Townsend | Watford | End of 2010–11 Season |
| 30 January 2011 | (England) Jamie O'Hara | Wolves | End of 2010–11 Season |
| 30 January 2011 | (Republic of Ireland) Robbie Keane | West Ham United | End of 2010–11 Season |
| 31 January 2011 | (Mexico) Giovani dos Santos | Racing Santander | End of 2010–11 Season |
| 15 March 2011 | (England) Simon Dawkins | San Jose Earthquakes |

== Season 2010–11 ==
=== Transfers ===
Tottenham began their transfer movement for the 2010–11 season in mid-March, when Spurs completed the deal for young Brazilian midfielder Sandro, joining the club from Internacional, a club whom Tottenham have a key affiliation, with Sandro linking up with squad following the 2010 Copa Libertadores. Early in the transfer window, Tottenham retained the services of a number of key players, with club captain Ledley King signing a new two-year contract extension with the club, closely followed by former Chelsea goalkeeper Carlo Cudicini, who signed a new one-year contract following his recovery from a serious road accident sustained in November 2009.

Luka Modrić was the next player to commit his future with the club, signing an extended six-year deal to ensure his services until 2016. After two months of little transfer activity, Tottenham secured the controversial signing of William Gallas on a free transfer following his release from rivals Arsenal. As a result of the move, Gallas became the first Premier League player to play for Chelsea, Arsenal and Tottenham Hotspur, all London clubs and fierce rivals. On transfer deadline day, early in the day, Spurs confirmed the loan signing of Croatian international goalkeeper Stipe Pletikosa from Spartak Moscow. This looked to be Spurs' only move of the day, but in the final few moments before the deadline, news broke that Tottenham were in negotiations with Real Madrid midfielder Rafael van der Vaart. Following the closure of the transfer window, the club had to wait for the deal to be ratified by the Premier League, due to complications on Spurs' computer. The transfer was completed the next day, with fee believed to be around £8 million.

During the transfer window, a number of players left Spurs, beginning with young goalkeeper Lee Butcher, leaving to join Leyton Orient on a free transfer after his contract expired at Tottenham, followed a month later by defender Sam Cox signing a contract with Barnet, again, following the expiration of his Spurs contract. Soon after, a number of fringe and academy players, including veteran goalkeeper Jimmy Walker, left the club on free transfers. In early August, Queens Park Rangers completed the permanent signing of Adel Taarabt for a fee believed to be around £1 million; Taarabt had spent to 2009–10 season on loan at QPR before sealing a permanent deal. Tottenham's final permanent outgoing transfer of the summer transfer window saw French defender Dorian Dervite move to Spanish club Villarreal for an undisclosed fee.

The transfer window also saw younger player acquires loan move to gain regular football. The first loan move saw young goalkeeper David Button, fresh off of signing a new three-year contract, join Plymouth Argyle on a season-long loan, followed by another young goalkeeper, Oscar Jansson, joining Northampton Town until September 2010, and completing three loan moves in a week, England under-19 international John Bostock left to join Hull City for the duration of the 2010–11 season. Six days later, winger Andros Townsend signed a season-long loan for Ipswich Town after featuring for Tottenham in their pre-season tour of the United States. On the same day, Dean Parrett joined David Button at Plymouth on a one-month deal. The following day, Ryan Mason, who also featured in Spurs' pre-season, joined Doncaster Rovers on a one-month deal, trailed a week later with young striker Jon Obika clinching a move to Crystal Palace for the season.

Spurs then signed young South African defender Bongani Khumalo for £1.5 million from South Africa's reigning champions Supersport United as their first signing of the January window. Khumalo joined on a four-and-a-half-year deal. The first senior exit of the window was David Bentley, who moved out on loan to Birmingham City on 12 January; the loan expires at the end of the season. Spurs then captured another South African in Steven Pienaar from Everton, beating Chelsea to the midfielder's signature in a deal that cost Spurs £3 million. A fairly quiet window ended with senior players Robbie Keane, Giovani dos Santos and Jamie O'Hara joining West Ham United, Racing de Santander and Wolverhampton Wanderers on loan deals, respectively. All three players will return at the end of the season.

=== Pre-season friendlies ===
Tottenham began their pre-season by facing Harry Redknapp and Kevin Bond's former team, AFC Bournemouth, beginning the pre-season with a comfortable 4–0 win. A goal midway through the first half from Jon Obika established a Spurs lead, before a Roman Pavlyuchenko goal doubled the tally. Danny Rose made it three a minute later before another Pavlyuchenko goal wrapped up the game and the winning start.

Spurs then began a tour of the United States, beginning in San Jose, facing Major League Soccer (MLS) outfit San Jose Earthquakes, with the game ending 0–0. Tottenham made the trip to New York to compete in the New York Football Challenge, a tournament featuring Spurs, the New York Red Bulls, Sporting CP and Premier League rivals Manchester City. Spurs' first game saw them pitted against the home side Red Bulls with their new signing, Theirry Henry, making his debut. Henry opened the scoring against his old rivals, before goals from Robbie Keane and Gareth Bale in the second half gave Spurs the 2–1 win. In Tottenham's final game of the tournament, Spurs faced Portuguese side Sporting, resulting in a 2–2 draw, which resulted in Sporting lifting the trophy of the New York Challenge. Tottenham took an early lead through Robbie Keane, finishing a one-on-one with the 'keeper. Sporting hit back with goals from Chileans Matías Fernández and Jaime Valdés. Spurs equalised though, 20 minutes from time after Jon Obika ran on to a Keane through ball to earn the draw for Tottenham.

Spurs' first friendly at White Hart Lane in the pre-season saw them face Villarreal. Midway through the first half, Villarreal took the lead with former Manchester United striker Giuseppe Rossi finishing a Santi Cazorla through-ball. Villarreal doubled their lead ten minutes later with Rossi scoring his second with clinical finishing following a slip from Michael Dawson. Early in the second half, an early goal from Giovani dos Santos set up a possible comeback, but this was extinguished later in the second half, with Rossi securing his hat-trick with a heavily deflected effort on goal. Villarreal wrapped up the game late on with Marco Ruben scoring a tap-in to give the away team a 4–1 win. Tottenham then travelled to Lisbon to play Benfica in the Eusébio Cup. Spurs ended up lifting the trophy after securing a 1–0 win, with Gareth Bale scoring the only goal of the game early into the second half. Tottenham ended the pre-season with a home fixture against Italian side Fiorentina early August. In this game, a defensive error gifted Fiorentina the lead inside ten minutes through Alberto Gilardino. Ten minutes later, Spurs hit back though with an equalising goal from Roman Pavlyuchenko, scoring his fourth goal in pre-season. Fiorentina re-gained the lead though, with a shot from Adem Ljajić beating Heurelho Gomes. Spurs, however, equalised early in the second half with Robbie Keane goal before earning the 3–2 win with a last minute Keane goal to end the pre-season with four wins, two draws, and one loss.

== League table ==
| Pos | Team | Pld | W | D | L | GF | GA | GD | Pts | Qualification or relegation |
|---|---|---|---|---|---|---|---|---|---|---|
| 3 | Manchester City | 38 | 21 | 8 | 9 | 60 | 33 | +27 | 71 | Qualification for the Champions League group stage |
| 4 | Arsenal | 38 | 19 | 11 | 8 | 72 | 43 | +29 | 68 | Qualification for the Champions League play-off round |
| 5 | Tottenham Hotspur | 38 | 16 | 14 | 8 | 55 | 46 | +9 | 62 | Qualification for the Europa League play-off round |
| 6 | Liverpool | 38 | 17 | 7 | 14 | 59 | 44 | +15 | 58 | |
| 7 | Everton | 38 | 13 | 15 | 10 | 51 | 45 | +6 | 54 | |

Source: Barclays Premier League
Rules for classification: 1) points; 2) goal difference; 3) number of goals scored.

== 2010–11 season long-term injuries ==
| Date injured | Player | Injury | Return date |
|---|---|---|---|
| 25 November 2009 | (England) Jonathan Woodgate | Groin Injury | January 2011 |
| 1 June 2010 | (England) Jamie O'Hara | Back Injury | January 2011 |
| 4 September 2010 | (England) Michael Dawson | Ankle Injury | 12 December 2010 |
| 7 September 2010 | (England) Jermain Defoe | Ankle Injury | 20 November 2010 |
| 15 November 2010 | (England) Tom Huddlestone | Ankle Injury | April 2011 |
| 10 July 2010 | (England) David Bentley | Ankle Injury | 21 September 2010 |
| 16 October 2010 | (England) Ledley King | Groin Injury | May 2011 |

== Competitions ==
=== Pre-season and friendlies ===
| Date | Opponents | H / A | Result (H/A) | Scorers | Attendance |
|---|---|---|---|---|---|
| 10 July 2010 | AFC Bournemouth | A | 0–4 | Obika 36', Pavlyuchenko 61',74' Rose 62' | 4,675 |
| 17 July 2010 | San Jose Earthquakes | A | 0–0 | | 10,721 |
| 22 July 2010 | New York Red Bulls | A | 1–2 | Keane 61', Bale 71' | 20,312 |
| 25 July 2010 | Sporting CP | A | 2–2 | Keane 23', Obika 69' | 23,228 |
| 29 July 2010 | Villarreal | H | 1–4 | Dos Santos 56' | 17,917 |
| 3 August 2010 | Benfica | A | 0–1 | Bale 55' | 30,215 |
| 7 August 2010 | Fiorentina | H | 3–2 | Pavlyuchenko 27', Keane 56', 89' | 13,561 |

=== Premier League ===
==== Matches ====
| Date | Opponents | H / A | Result (H/A) | Scorers | Attendance |
|---|---|---|---|---|---|
| 14 August 2010 | Manchester City | H | 0–0 | | 35,928 |
| 21 August 2010 | Stoke City | A | 1–2 | Bale 18', 30' | 27,243 |
| 28 August 2010 | Wigan | H | 0–1 | | 35,101 |
| 11 September 2010 | West Brom | A | 1–1 | Modrić 27' | 23,642 |
| 18 September 2010 | Wolves | H | 3–1 | Van der Vaart 77' (pen), Pavlyuchenko 87', Hutton 90+1' | 35,940 |
| 25 September 2010 | West Ham | A | 1–0 | | 34,190 |
| 2 October 2010 | Aston Villa | H | 2–1 | Van der Vaart 45+3', 75' | 35,871 |
| 16 October 2010 | Fulham | A | 1–2 | Pavlyuchenko 31', Huddlestone 63' | 25,615 |
| 23 October 2010 | Everton | H | 1–1 | Van der Vaart 20' | 35,967 |
| 30 October 2010 | Manchester United | A | 2–0 | | 75,223 |
| 6 November 2010 | Bolton | A | 4–2 | Hutton 79', Pavlyuchenko 87' | 20,255 |
| 9 November 2010 | Sunderland | H | 1–1 | Van der Vaart 64' | 35,843 |
| 13 November 2010 | Blackburn | H | 4–2 | Bale 16', 75', Pavlyuchenko 42', Crouch 69' | 35,700 |
| 20 November 2010 | Arsenal | A | 2–3 | Bale 50', Van der Vaart 67' (pen), Kaboul 86' | 60,102 |
| 28 November 2010 | Liverpool | H | 2–1 | Škrtel 65' (o.g.), Lennon 90+2' | 35,962 |
| 4 December 2010 | Birmingham | A | 1–1 | Bassong 19' | 25,770 |
| 12 December 2010 | Chelsea | H | 1–1 | Pavlyuchenko 15' | 35,787 |
| 26 December 2010 | Aston Villa | A | 1–2 | Van der Vaart 23', 67' | 39,411 |
| 28 December 2010 | Newcastle | H | 2–0 | Lennon 57', Bale 81' | 35,927 |
| 1 January 2011 | Fulham | H | 1–0 | Bale 42' | 35,603 |
| 5 January 2011 | Everton | A | 2–1 | Van der Vaart 11' | 34,124 |
| 16 January 2011 | Manchester United | H | 0–0 | | 35,828 |
| 22 January 2011 | Newcastle | A | 1–1 | Lennon 90' | 51,010 |
| 2 February 2011 | Blackburn | A | 0–1 | Crouch 3' | 23,253 |
| 5 February 2011 | Bolton | H | 2–1 | Van der Vaart 6' (pen), Kranjčar 90+2' | 36,197 |
| 12 February 2011 | Sunderland | A | 1–2 | Dawson 44', Kranjčar 57' | 40,986 |
| 22 February 2011 | Blackpool | A | 3–1 | Pavlyuchenko 90' | 16,069 |
| 6 March 2011 | Wolves | A | 3–3 | Defoe 30', 35', Pavlyuchenko 48' | 28,669 |
| 19 March 2011 | West Ham | H | 0–0 | | 36,010 |
| 2 April 2011 | Wigan | A | 0–0 | | 18.578 |
| 9 April 2011 | Stoke | H | 3–2 | Crouch 11', 34', Modrić 18' | 32,702 |
| 20 April 2011 | Arsenal | H | 3–3 | Van der Vaart 6', 70' (pen), Huddlestone 43' | 36,138 |
| 23 April 2011 | West Brom | H | 2–2 | Pavlyuchenko 27', Defoe 66' | 36,160 |
| 30 April 2011 | Chelsea | A | 2–1 | Sandro 19' | 41,681 |
| 7 May 2011 | Blackpool | H | 1–1 | Defoe 89' | 35,585 |
| 10 May 2011 | Manchester City | A | 1–0 | | 47,029 |
| 15 May 2011 | Liverpool | A | 0–2 | Van der Vaart 9', Modrić 56' (pen) | 44,893 |
| 22 May 2011 | Birmingham | H | 2–1 | Pavlyuchenko 49', 90+3' | 36,119 |

==== Results by matchday ====
| Match | 1 | 2 | 3 | 4 | 5 | 6 | 7 | 8 | 9 | 10 | 11 | 12 | 13 | 14 | 15 | 16 | 17 | 18 | 19 | 20 | 21 | 22 | 23 | 24 | 25 | 26 | 27 | 28 | 29 | 30 | 31 | 32 | 33 | 34 | 35 | 36 | 37 | 38 |
|---|---|---|---|---|---|---|---|---|---|---|---|---|---|---|---|---|---|---|---|---|---|---|---|---|---|---|---|---|---|---|---|---|---|---|---|---|---|---|
| Ground | H | A | H | A | H | A | H | A | H | A | A | H | H | A | H | A | H | A | A | H | A | H | A | A | H | A | A | A | H | A | H | H | A | H | A | H | A | H |
| Result | D | W | L | D | W | L | W | W | D | L | L | D | W | W | W | D | D | W | W | W | L | D | D | W | W | W | L | D | D | D | W | D | D | L | D | L | W | W |
| Position | 14 | 8 | 11 | 11 | 5 | 8 | 5 | 5 | 5 | 5 | 7 | 7 | 6 | 6 | 5 | 5 | 5 | 5 | 5 | 5 | 4 | 4 | 5 | 5 | 5 | 5 | 4 | 5 | 5 | 5 | 5 | 5 | 5 | 6 | 5 | 6 | 5 | 5 |

Updated to match(es) played on 23 May 2011. Source: Premier League
A = Away; H = Home; W = Win; D = Draw; L = Loss

=== Champions League ===
==== Play-off round ====
| Round | Date | Opponents | H / A | Result (H/A) | Scorers | Attendance |
|---|---|---|---|---|---|---|
| 1st Leg | 17 August 2010 | Young Boys | A | 3–2 | Bassong 42', Pavlyuchenko 83' | 31,275 |
| 2nd Leg | 25 August 2010 | Young Boys | H | 4–0 | Crouch 5', 61', 78' (pen), Defoe 32' | 34,709 |

Tottenham Hotspur win 6–3 on aggregate.

==== Group stage ====
| Date | Opponents | H / A | Result (H/A) | Scorers | Attendance |
|---|---|---|---|---|---|
| 14 September 2010 | Werder Bremen | A | 2–2 | Pasanen 12' (o.g.), Crouch 18' | 40,000 |
| 29 September 2010 | Twente | H | 4–1 | Van der Vaart 47', Pavlyuchenko 50' (pen), 64' (pen), Bale 85' | 32,518 |
| 20 October 2010 | Internazionale | A | 4–3 | Bale 52', 90', 90+1' | 70,520 |
| 2 November 2010 | Internazionale | H | 3–1 | Van der Vaart 18', Crouch 61', Pavlyuchenko 89' | 34,103 |
| 24 November 2010 | Werder Bremen | H | 3–0 | Kaboul 6', Modrić 45+1', Crouch 79' | 33,546 |
| 7 December 2010 | Twente | A | 3–3 | Wisgerhof 12' (o.g.), Defoe 47', 59' | 24,000 |

| Pos | Team | Pld | W | D | L | GF | GA | GD | Pts | Qualification | TOT | INT | TWE | BRM |
|---|---|---|---|---|---|---|---|---|---|---|---|---|---|---|
| 1 | (England) Tottenham Hotspur | 6 | 3 | 2 | 1 | 18 | 11 | +7 | 11 | Advance to knockout phase | — | 3–1 | 4–1 | 3–0 |
| 2 | (Italy) Internazionale | 6 | 3 | 1 | 2 | 12 | 11 | +1 | 10 | Advance to knockout phase | 4–3 | — | 1–0 | 4–0 |
| 3 | (Netherlands) Twente | 6 | 1 | 3 | 2 | 9 | 11 | −2 | 6 | Transfer to Europa League | 3–3 | 2–2 | — | 1–1 |
| 4 | (Germany) Werder Bremen | 6 | 1 | 2 | 3 | 6 | 12 | −6 | 5 | | 2–2 | 3–0 | 0–2 | — |

Source: Soccerway

==== Knockout Phase ====
===== Round of 16 =====
| Round | Date | Opponents | H / A | Result (H/A) | Scorers | Attendance |
|---|---|---|---|---|---|---|
| 1st Leg | 15 February 2011 | Milan | A | 0–1 | Crouch 80' | 75,652 |
| 2nd Leg | 9 March 2011 | Milan | H | 0–0 | | 34,320 |

Tottenham Hotspur win 1–0 on aggregate.

===== Quarter-final =====
| Round | Date | Opponents | H / A | Result (H/A) | Scorers | Attendance |
|---|---|---|---|---|---|---|
| 1st Leg | 5 April 2011 | Real Madrid | A | 4–0 | | 77,427 |
| 2nd Leg | 13 April 2011 | Real Madrid | H | 0–1 | | 34,311 |

Real Madrid win 5–0 on aggregate

=== FA Cup ===
| Round | Date | Opponents | H / A | Result (H/A) | Scorers | Attendance |
|---|---|---|---|---|---|---|
| Third Round | 9 January 2011 | Charlton | H | 3–0 | Townsend 49', Defoe 58', 60' | 35,698 |
| Fourth Round | 30 January 2011 | Fulham | A | 4–0 | | 21,829 |

=== League Cup ===
| Round | Date | Opponents | H / A | Result (H/A) | Scorers | Attendance |
|---|---|---|---|---|---|---|
| Third Round | 21 September 2010 | Arsenal | H | 1–4 (a.e.t.) | Keane 49' | 35,883 |

== Statistics ==
=== Appearances ===
Last updated: 26 July 2020.
Source: premierleague.com

| No. | Pos. | Name | Premier League | | FA Cup | | League Cup | | Champions League | | Total | |
| No. | Pos. | Name | Apps | Goals | Apps | Goals | Apps | Goals | Apps | Goals | Apps | Goals |
Goalkeepers
| 1 | GK | (Brazil) Heurelho Gomes | 30 | 0 | 1 | 0 | 0 | 0 | 10 | 0 | 41 | 0 |
| 23 | GK | (Italy) Carlo Cudicini | 8 | 0 | 1 | 0 | 0 | 0 | 2+2 | 0 | 11+2 | 0 |
| 37 | GK | (Croatia) Stipe Pletikosa | 0 | 0 | 0 | 0 | 1 | 0 | 0 | 0 | 1 | 0 |
Defenders
| 2 | DF | (Scotland) Alan Hutton | 19+2 | 2 | 1 | 0 | 0 | 0 | 4 | 0 | 24+2 | 2 |
| 4 | DF | (France) Younes Kaboul | 19+2 | 1 | 0 | 0 | 0 | 0 | 3 | 1 | 22+2 | 2 |
| 13 | DF | (France) William Gallas | 26+1 | 0 | 0+1 | 0 | 0 | 0 | 8 | 0 | 34+2 | 0 |
| 16 | DF | (England) Kyle Naughton | 0 | 0 | 0 | 0 | 1 | 0 | 0 | 0 | 1 | 0 |
| 19 | DF | (Cameroon) Sebastien Bassong | 7+5 | 1 | 2 | 0 | 1 | 0 | 4+1 | 1 | 14+6 | 2 |
| 20 | DF | (England) Michael Dawson | 24 | 1 | 2 | 0 | 0 | 0 | 6 | 0 | 32 | 1 |
| 22 | DF | (Croatia) Vedran Corluka | 13+2 | 0 | 1 | 0 | 0 | 0 | 8 | 0 | 22+2 | 0 |
| 25 | DF | (England) Danny Rose | 4 | 0 | 0 | 0 | 0 | 0 | 0 | 0 | 4 | 0 |
| 26 | DF | (England) Ledley King | 6 | 0 | 0 | 0 | 0 | 0 | 3 | 0 | 9 | 0 |
| 28 | DF | (England) Kyle Walker | 0+1 | 0 | 0 | 0 | 0 | 0 | 0 | 0 | 0+1 | 0 |
| 32 | DF | (Cameroon) Benoît Assou-Ekotto | 30 | 0 | 2 | 0 | 1 | 0 | 12 | 0 | 45 | 0 |
| 39 | DF | (England) Jonathan Woodgate | 0 | 0 | 0 | 0 | 0 | 0 | 0+1 | 0 | 0+1 | 0 |
| 45 | DF | (England) Steven Caulker | 0 | 0 | 0 | 0 | 1 | 0 | 0 | 0 | 1 | 0 |
Midfielders
| 3 | MF | (Wales) Gareth Bale | 29+1 | 7 | 0 | 0 | 0 | 0 | 10+1 | 4 | 39+2 | 11 |
| 5 | MF | (England) David Bentley | 1+1 | 0 | 0 | 0 | 1 | 0 | 0 | 0 | 2+1 | 0 |
| 6 | MF | (England) Tom Huddlestone | 13+1 | 2 | 0 | 0 | 0 | 0 | 6+1 | 0 | 19+2 | 2 |
| 7 | MF | (England) Aaron Lennon | 25+9 | 3 | 1 | 0 | 0+1 | 0 | 8+2 | 0 | 34+12 | 3 |
| 8 | MF | (England) Jermaine Jenas | 14+5 | 0 | 0+1 | 0 | 0 | 0 | 5+3 | 0 | 19+9 | 0 |
| 11 | MF | (Netherlands) Rafael van der Vaart | 28 | 13 | 1 | 0 | 0 | 0 | 7 | 2 | 36 | 15 |
| 12 | MF | (Honduras) Wilson Palacios | 16+5 | 0 | 1 | 0 | 1 | 0 | 4+4 | 0 | 22+9 | 0 |
| 14 | MF | (Croatia) Luka Modrić | 32 | 3 | 1+1 | 0 | 0 | 0 | 8+1 | 1 | 41+2 | 4 |
| 21 | MF | (Croatia) Niko Kranjčar | 2+11 | 2 | 1 | 0 | 0+1 | 0 | 1+5 | 0 | 4+17 | 2 |
| 29 | MF | (England) Jake Livermore | 0 | 0 | 0 | 0 | 1 | 0 | 0 | 0 | 1 | 0 |
| 30 | MF | (Brazil) Sandro | 11+8 | 1 | 2 | 0 | 1 | 0 | 3+1 | 0 | 17+9 | 1 |
| 31 | MF | (England) Andros Townsend | 0 | 0 | 1 | 1 | 0 | 0 | 0 | 0 | 1 | 1 |
| 40 | MF | (South Africa) Steven Pienaar | 5+3 | 0 | 1 | 0 | 0 | 0 | 2 | 0 | 8+3 | 0 |
Forwards
| 9 | FW | (Russia) Roman Pavlyuchenko | 18+11 | 10 | 1 | 0 | 1 | 0 | 5+3 | 4 | 25+14 | 14 |
| 10 | FW | (Republic of Ireland) Robbie Keane | 2+5 | 0 | 0 | 0 | 0+1 | 1 | 0+5 | 0 | 2+11 | 1 |
| 15 | FW | (England) Peter Crouch | 20+14 | 4 | 0+1 | 0 | 0 | 0 | 9+1 | 7 | 29+16 | 11 |
| 17 | FW | (Mexico) Giovani dos Santos | 0+3 | 0 | 0 | 0 | 1 | 0 | 1 | 0 | 2+3 | 0 |
| 18 | FW | (England) Jermain Defoe | 16+6 | 4 | 2 | 2 | 0 | 0 | 3+3 | 3 | 21+9 | 9 |

=== Goal scorers ===
Last updated: 26 July 2020.
Source: premierleague.com

The list is sorted by shirt number when total goals are equal.

| Rnk | Pos | No. | Player | Premier League | FA Cup | League Cup | Champions League | Total |
|---|---|---|---|---|---|---|---|---|
| 1 | MF | 11 | (Netherlands) Rafael van der Vaart | 13 | 0 | 0 | 2 | 15 |
| 2 | FW | 9 | (Russia) Roman Pavlyuchenko | 10 | 0 | 0 | 4 | 14 |
| 3 | MF | 3 | (Wales) Gareth Bale | 7 | 0 | 0 | 4 | 11 |
| 3 | FW | 15 | (England) Peter Crouch | 4 | 0 | 0 | 7 | 11 |
| 5 | FW | 18 | (England) Jermain Defoe | 4 | 2 | 0 | 3 | 9 |
| 6 | MF | 14 | (Croatia) Luka Modrić | 3 | 0 | 0 | 1 | 4 |
| 7 | MF | 7 | (England) Aaron Lennon | 3 | 0 | 0 | 0 | 3 |
| 8 | DF | 2 | (Scotland) Alan Hutton | 2 | 0 | 0 | 0 | 2 |
| 8 | DF | 4 | (France) Younes Kaboul | 1 | 0 | 0 | 1 | 2 |
| 8 | MF | 6 | (England) Tom Huddlestone | 2 | 0 | 0 | 0 | 2 |
| 8 | DF | 19 | (Cameroon) Sebastien Bassong | 1 | 0 | 0 | 1 | 2 |
| 8 | MF | 21 | (Croatia) Niko Kranjcar | 2 | 0 | 0 | 0 | 2 |
| 13 | FW | 10 | (Republic of Ireland) Robbie Keane | 0 | 0 | 1 | 0 | 1 |
| 13 | DF | 20 | (England) Michael Dawson | 1 | 0 | 0 | 0 | 1 |
| 13 | MF | 30 | (Brazil) Sandro | 1 | 0 | 0 | 0 | 1 |
| 13 | MF | 31 | (England) Andros Townsend | 0 | 1 | 0 | 0 | 1 |
| TOTALS | | | | 54 | 3 | 1 | 23 | 81 |

=== Clean sheets ===
Last updated: 26 July 2020.
Source: premierleague.com

The list is sorted by shirt number when total clean sheets are equal.

| Rnk | No. | Player | Premier League | FA Cup | League Cup | Champions League | Total |
|---|---|---|---|---|---|---|---|
| 1 | 1 | (Brazil) Heurelho Gomes | 7 | 0 | 0 | 4 | 11 |
| 2 | 23 | (Italy) Carlo Cudicini | 1 | 1 | 0 | 1 | 3 |
| TOTALS | | | 8 | 1 | 0 | 5 | 14 |
