= Yun Suk-young =

South Korean footballer (born 1990)

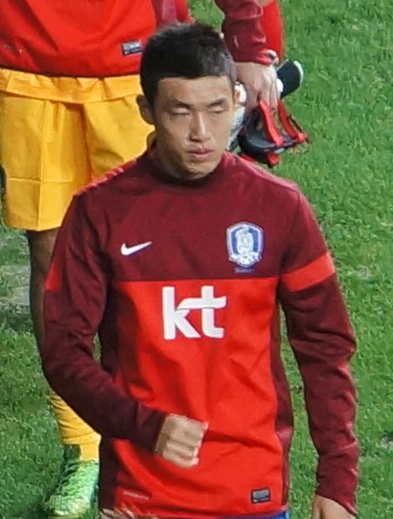
- Yun training with South Korea in 2013

Personal information
- Full name: Yun Suk-young
- Date of birth: 13 February 1990 (age 36)
- Place of birth: Suwon, Gyeonggi, South Korea
- Height: 1.82 m (6 ft 0 in)
- Position: Left-back

Team information
- Current team: Chungbuk Cheongju FC
- Number: 20

Youth career
- 2006–2008: Jeonnam Dragons

Senior career*
Years	Team	Apps	(Gls)
2009–2012	Jeonnam Dragons	80	(4)
2013–2016	Queens Park Rangers	33	(1)
2013	→ Doncaster Rovers (loan)	3	(0)
2016	→ Charlton Athletic (loan)	9	(0)
2016	Brøndby IF	0	(0)
2017–2020	Kashiwa Reysol	17	(0)
2018	→ FC Seoul (loan)	22	(1)
2019	→ Gangwon FC (loan)	28	(0)
2020	→ Busan IPark (loan)	6	(0)
2021–2024	Gangwon FC	105	(4)
2025–	Chungbuk Cheongju FC	29	(0)

International career^{‡}
2007	South Korea U17	10	(1)
2008–2009	South Korea U20	12	(0)
2010–2012	South Korea U23	27	(0)
2012–2018	South Korea	13	(0)
Medal record
Olympic Games
Bronze medal – third place	2012 London	Team
Asian Games
Bronze medal – third place	2010 Guangzhou	Team
- * Club domestic league appearances and goals as of 6 August 2026 ‡ National team caps and goals as of 11 September 2018

- Yun Suk-young
- Hangul: 윤석영
- Hanja: 尹錫榮
- RR: Yun Seokyeong
- MR: Yun Sŏgyŏng

Yun Suk-young (Korean: 윤석영; Korean pronunciation: [jun.sʌ.ɡjʌŋ]; born 13 February 1990) is a South Korean footballer who plays as a left-back for K League 2 club Chungbuk Cheongju.

== Club career ==
=== Jeonnam Dragons ===
Yun made his debut for Jeonnam Dragons in 2009 and went on to make a total of 86 appearances for the side.

=== QPR ===
Yun signed for Queens Park Rangers on the 30 January 2013 for an undisclosed fee on a three-and-a-half-year deal. Yun did not make a senior appearance for QPR in his first season with the club, in which they were relegated from the Premier League. However, he was included in the match day squad as a substitute for the first game of the 2013–14 Championship season before making his first league start of the campaign the next week in the away trip to Huddersfield Town, where he provided the assist for Junior Hoilett's equalising goal.

Away to Sheffield Wednesday on 18 March 2014, Yun came on as a substitute for Hoilett at half-time to cover the defence after Richard Dunne had been sent off. QPR lost 3–0. In the following game, on 23 March he played full 90 minutes against Middlesbrough and was awarded the Man of the Match. QPR won the game 3–1. He scored his first QPR goal on the 3 May 2014 in a 3–2 win against Barnsley.

==== Doncaster Rovers (loan) ====
Yun signed a two-month loan deal with Doncaster Rovers on 25 October 2013.

==== Charlton Athletic (loan) ====
On 15 February 2016, Yun signed for Charlton Athletic on loan until the end of season.

=== Brøndby IF ===
Signed for Brøndby IF on free transfer on 12 September 2016 a contract for the remainder of the year. On 9 December 2016, Brøndby IF announced, that Yun would leave the club at the start of the new year.

=== Kashiwa Reysol ===
On 1 January 2017, he joined J.League side Kashiwa Reysol. Yun made 10 appearances during the 2017 J1 League season, as Kashiwa finished fourth, qualifying for the 2018 AFC Champions League play-off round. The following January, he extended his contract until 2020.

=== FC Seoul (loan) ===
On 29 June 2018, he joined K League 1 side FC Seoul on loan for the second half of the season.

=== Gangwon FC (loan) ===
Yun joined Gangwon FC on loan for the 2019 K League 1 season on March 5, 2019.

=== Busan IPark (loan) ===
Ahead of the 2020 K League 1 season, he joined Busan IPark on loan from Kashiwa Reysol. Yun missed most of the season due to injury, making six appearances in total, as Busan were relegated to K League 2.

=== Gangwon FC ===
On 6 January 2021, Yun returned to Gangwon FC, this time on a permanent deal. He scored his first goal for the club in a 3–0 home victory over Daegu FC on 10 April 2021.

== International career ==
Yun played at Under 17 and Under 20 before appearing for the South Korea senior team on 16 October 2009 against Iran in a World Cup qualifier.

He also appeared in the 2012 Summer Olympics at Under 23 level, winning a bronze medal.

In the 2014 FIFA World Cup, Yun appeared in all three of South Korea's games during the group stage. The team finished last in their group with one point.

== Personal life ==
Despite the similarities in name, Yun is not related to incumbent President of South Korea Yoon Suk-yeol.

== Career statistics ==
=== Club ===
As of matches played 18 August 2024

Appearances and goals by club, season and competition
Club	Season	League			Cup		League Cup		Continental		Other		Total	
Club	Season	Division	Apps	Goals	Apps	Goals	Apps	Goals	Apps	Goals	Apps	Goals	Apps	Goals
Jeonnam Dragons	2009	K League 1	20	1	2	0	1	0	—		—		23	1
Jeonnam Dragons	2010	K League 1	16	0	3	0	3	0	—		—		22	0
Jeonnam Dragons	2011	K League 1	19	1	2	0	2	0	—		—		23	1
Jeonnam Dragons	2012	K League 1	25	2	2	0	—		—		—		27	2
Jeonnam Dragons	Total		80	4	9	0	6	0	—		—		95	4
Queens Park Rangers	2013–14	Championship	7	1	0	0	2	0	—		2	0	11	1
Queens Park Rangers	2014–15	Premier League	23	0	0	0	0	0	—		—		23	0
Queens Park Rangers	2015–16	Championship	3	0	0	0	0	0	—		—		3	0
Queens Park Rangers	Total		33	1	0	0	2	0	—		2	0	37	1
Doncaster Rovers(loan)	2013–14	Championship	3	0	—		—		—		—		3	0
Charlton Athletic (loan)	2015–16	Championship	9	0	—		—		—		—		9	0
Brøndby IF	2016–17	Danish Superliga	0	0	1	0	—		—		—		1	0
Kashiwa Reysol	2017	J1 League	10	0	2	0	0	0	—		—		12	0
Kashiwa Reysol	2018	J1 League	7	0	0	0	—		1	0	—		8	0
Kashiwa Reysol	Total		17	0	2	0	0	0	1	0	—		20	0
FC Seoul (loan)	2018	K League 1	22	1	2	0	—		—		1	0	25	1
Gangwon FC (loan)	2019	K League 1	28	0	3	0	—		—		—		31	1
Busan IPark (loan)	2020	K League 1	6	0	0	0	—		—		—		6	0
Gangwon FC	2021	K League 1	31	1	2	0	—		—		2	0	35	1
Gangwon FC	2022	K League 1	32	1	1	0	—		—		—		33	1
Gangwon FC	2023	K League 1	30	0	2	0	—		—		2	0	34	0
Gangwon FC	2024	K League 1	17	2	0	0	—		—		—		17	2
Gangwon FC	Total		110	4	5	0	—		—		4	0	119	4
Career total			310	10	22	0	8	0	1	0	5	0	346	10

^{1}Includes EFL Championship play-offs and AFC Champions League and K League Promotion-Relegation Playoffs.

== Honours ==
Queens Park Rangers

- Football League Championship play-offs: 2014
