= Joe Lumley =

English footballer (born 1995)

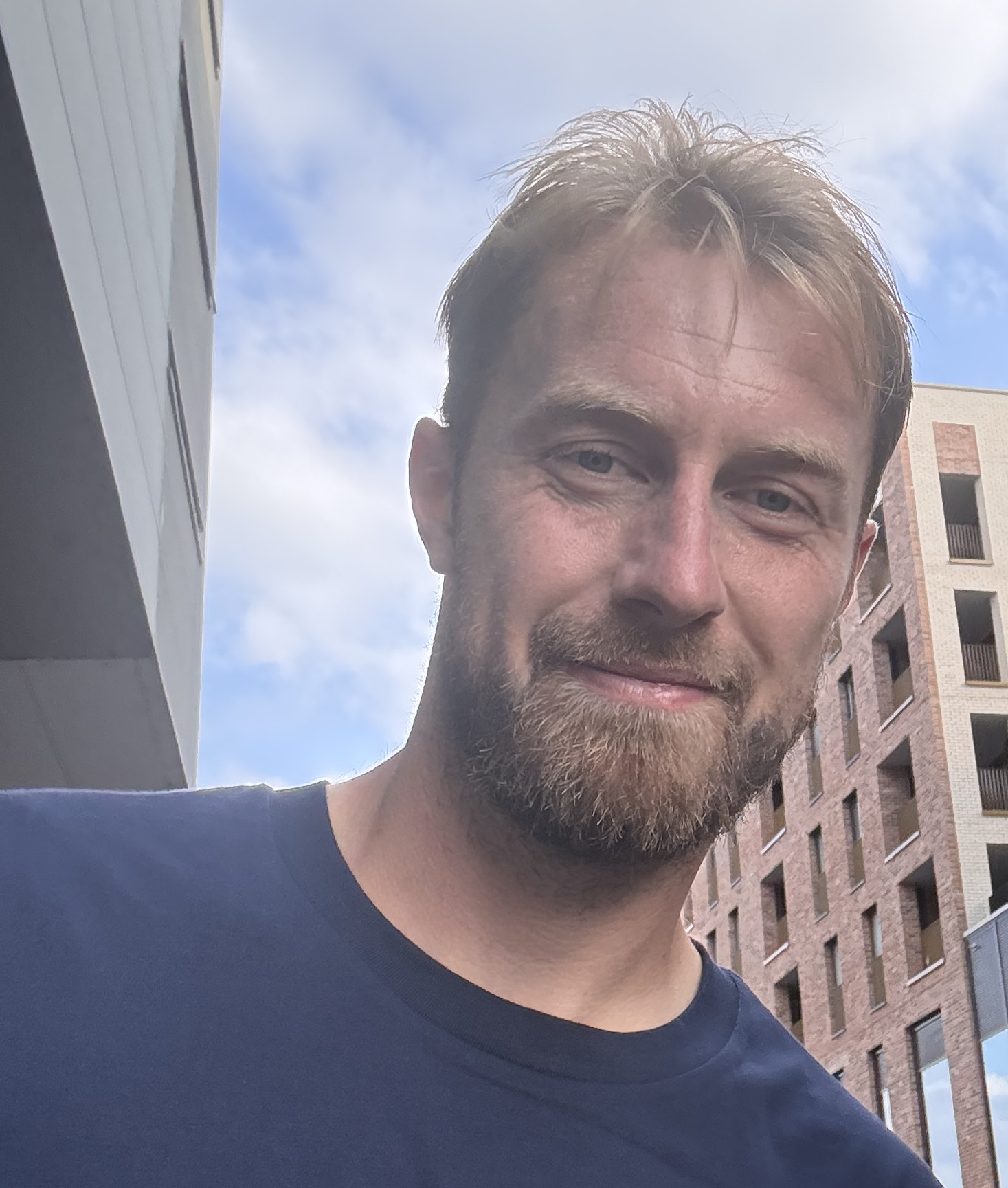
- Lumley in 2026

Personal information
- Full name: Joseph Patrick Lumley
- Date of birth: 15 February 1995 (age 31)
- Place of birth: Harlow, England
- Position: Goalkeeper

Team information
- Current team: Sheffield Wednesday
- Number: 1

Youth career
- –2010: Tottenham Hotspur
- 2010–2013: Queens Park Rangers

Senior career*
Years	Team	Apps	(Gls)
2013–2021	Queens Park Rangers	77	(0)
2014	→ Bishop's Stortford (loan)	4	(0)
2014	→ Accrington Stanley (loan)	5	(0)
2014	→ Morecambe (loan)	0	(0)
2015	→ Stevenage (loan)	0	(0)
2017	→ Bristol Rovers (loan)	19	(0)
2018	→ Blackpool (loan)	17	(0)
2020	→ Gillingham (loan)	2	(0)
2020	→ Doncaster Rovers (loan)	8	(0)
2021–2023	Middlesbrough	34	(0)
2022–2023	→ Reading (loan)	41	(0)
2023–2025	Southampton	3	(0)
2025–2026	Bristol City	0	(0)
2025	→ Sheffield Wednesday (loan)	2	(0)
2026–	Sheffield Wednesday	10	(0)
- * Club domestic league appearances and goals as of 21:55, 20 November 2026 (UTC)

Joseph Patrick Lumley (born 15 February 1995) is an English professional footballer who plays as a goalkeeper for EFL League One club Sheffield Wednesday.

Lumley began his professional career at Queens Park Rangers in 2013. During his time at the club, he had various loan spells with Bishop's Stortford, Accrington Stanley, Morecambe, Stevenage, Bristol Rovers, Blackpool, Gillingham and Doncaster Rovers. In 2021, Lumley joined Middlesbrough. He spent the 2022–23 season on loan at Reading. Lumley moved to Southampton in August 2023 before joining Bristol City in June 2025. He initially joined Sheffield Wednesday on a seven-day emergency loan in October 2025 and later joined the club permanently in July 2026.

== Career ==
=== Tottenham Hotspur ===
As a ten-year-old, Lumley was scouted by Tottenham Hotspur while playing for local junior side Buckhurst Hill; Tottenham also signed his brother Billy. Lumley played alongside the likes of Harry Winks and looked up to Harry Kane during his time at Tottenham Hotspur. On 30 June 2010, Lumley was released by Tottenham at the age of 16 having not being offered a full time scholarship.

=== Queens Park Rangers ===
Within the 2010 summer transfer window, Lumley signed for London neighbours Queens Park Rangers.

On 15 May 2013, Lumley was part of the QPR under-18s who won the Professional Development League Two with a 1–0 win over Huddersfield Town. Two weeks later, Lumley signed his first professional contract moving up from scholarship terms on a one-year deal.

On 16 June 2014, Lumley signed a one-year contract extension with QPR meaning he would remain until the summer of 2015. During a pre-season tour of Germany before the 2014–15 season, Lumley was drafted into the squad after an injury to goalkeeper Brian Murphy. Lumley played the second 45 minutes in a 1–0 win against Rot-Weiß Erfurt and first-choice keeper Rob Green admitted he was 'really pleased' to see Lumley doing well.

On 15 May 2015, Lumley signed a new two-year contract keeping him until summer of 2017.

Due to a goalkeeper injury crisis, on 9 January 2016, Lumley made his Queens Park Rangers debut in the FA Cup against Nottingham Forest at the City Ground, which resulted in a 1–0 defeat. On 12 January 2016, Lumley then went on to make his Championship debut in a 1–1 draw with Blackburn Rovers, playing the full 90 minutes.

On 17 July 2018, Lumley signed a three-year deal committing until the summer of 2021.

After the departure of Alex Smithies to Cardiff City at the end of the 2017–18 season, Lumley became the Rangers first choice keeper, keeping his first QPR clean sheet against Wigan Athletic in a 1–0 win. In October 2018, he won Supporters Player of the Month as he helped collect 13 points which was the largest tally out of all teams in the Championship that month. He made 46 appearances in all competitions and keeping 16 clean sheets in the 2018–19 season.

In the 2019–20 season, he competed for the place with newly signed Liam Kelly which limited his appearances to 28 for the season. He ended the Championship restart with six consecutive starts.

On 19 November 2019, Lumley became an ambassador for the QPR Trust working across different areas including sports participation, education, health, homelessness and food poverty.

=== Loan spells ===
==== Bishop's Stortford ====
On 7 March 2014, Lumley joined Bishop's Stortford on a one-month loan deal, in order to gain some first-team experience. On 8 March 2014, Lumley made his Bishop's Stortford debut in a 1–1 draw against Tonbridge Angels. Lumley went on to make three more appearances before returning to Queens Park Rangers.

==== Accrington Stanley ====
On 23 August 2014, Lumley signed on a month-long youth loan for Accrington Stanley. Lumley made his Football League debut for Accrington Stanley against Bury on 30 August 2014.

==== Morecambe ====
On 7 November 2014, Lumley joined League Two side Morecambe on a one-month loan deal. After only making one appearance for Morecambe in a 1–0 defeat to Dover Athletic in the FA Cup, Lumley returned to Queens Park Rangers.

==== Stevenage ====
On 7 October 2015, Lumley joined Stevenage on a one-month loan. After failing to make a single appearance at Stevenage, Lumley returned to Loftus Road.

==== Bristol Rovers ====
On 18 January 2017, Lumley joined League One side Bristol Rovers on loan until the end of the 2016–17 season. Lumley made his debut for the club on 21 January 2017 in a 3–1 defeat to Walsall. He followed the defeat at Walsall with two clean sheets in a 1–0 victory over Swindon Town and a 0–0 draw away at Rochdale. The following week he made a man of the match performance in a 1–1 draw against Bradford City making saves to keep out Tony McMahon, Charlie Wyke and Nathaniel Knight-Percival. Lumley played the final game of his loan spell, during which he kept eight clean sheets, in a 4–3 defeat to Millwall on 30 April 2017.

==== Blackpool ====
On 8 January 2018, he moved to League One side Blackpool on loan until the end of the season, but was recalled by QPR on 26 April 2018 following an injury to team-mate Matt Ingram. He made his Blackpool debut in a 0–0 draw against Bristol Rovers. Lumley kept a total of nine clean sheets during his time at the Tangerines.

==== Gillingham ====
On 30 October 2020 he signed for League One side Gillingham on an emergency loan deal following an injury to the Kent side's first choice goalkeeper Jack Bonham. He made two appearances for the club before heading back to QPR.

==== Doncaster Rovers ====
On 20 November 2020, Lumley signed for League One side Doncaster Rovers on an emergency seven-day loan deal. During his first week, Lumley helped Doncaster earn 4 points which included a draw with Sunderland and a win against Blackpool. His loan was then extended by a further seven days. On 4 December, it was then extended by a further week. The loan deal was then extended by another week. On 18 December 2020, it was extended by another seven days. On 5 January 2021, it was confirmed that the loan spell had ended and that Lumley had returned to Queens Park Rangers.

=== Middlesbrough ===
At the end of the 2020–21 season, Lumley was offered a new contract. However he turned this down in search for first-team football and on 19 May 2021, it was announced that he would join fellow Championship side Middlesbrough on a two-year deal, with an option of a further year. He was released from the club in May 2023.

==== Reading (loan) ====
On 19 June 2022, Lumley joined Reading on a season-long loan deal. He made his debut for the club on 30 July 2022 in a 1–0 defeat to Blackpool. Despite Reading's relegation to League One, Lumley kept seven clean sheets in 42 league appearances and was awarded Players' Player of the Year.

=== Southampton ===
On 7 August 2023, Lumley signed for Southampton on a one-year contract. He made his first appearance for the club on 6 January 2024 in a 4–0 victory against Walsall in the FA Cup. On 14 March 2024, Lumley signed a new one-year contract. He made his Premier League debut on 29 November 2024 in a 1–1 draw with Brighton & Hove Albion. On 25 June 2025, Southampton confirmed that Lumley would be released following the expiry of his contract.

=== Bristol City ===
On 25 June 2025, Lumley signed for Bristol City on a two-year contract. In relation to his signing, Technical Director Brian Tinnion added: "Joe is a goalkeeper with experience in the EFL and Premier League. He adds both strength and depth to the goalkeeping department and we're excited to work with him."

==== Sheffield Wednesday (loan) ====
On 21 October 2025, Lumley signed for Sheffield Wednesday on a seven-day emergency loan, covering the injured Pierce Charles and suspended Ethan Horvath. He made his debut in a 1–0 defeat to Middlesbrough and also played against Oxford United in a 2–1 defeat, before returning to Bristol City.

=== Sheffield Wednesday ===
On 11 July 2026, Lumley signed a two-year contract with League One club Sheffield Wednesday on a free transfer. He was one of eight players to make their debut against Bolton Wanderers in the EFL Cup, starting the game in a 1–0 win.

== Personal life ==
As a child, Lumley idolised keeper Shay Given especially during his days at Newcastle United. Lumley would spend hours imitating Given's saves in his back garden with brother Billy Lumley. His brother now lives in Australia and runs his own goalkeeper academy.

== Career statistics ==
As of 20 November 2026

Appearances and goals by club, season and competition
Club	Season	League			FA Cup		League Cup		Other		Total	
Club	Season	Division	Apps	Goals	Apps	Goals	Apps	Goals	Apps	Goals	Apps	Goals
Queens Park Rangers	2015–16	Championship	1	0	1	0	0	0	—		2	0
Queens Park Rangers	2016–17	Championship	0	0	0	0	0	0	—		0	0
Queens Park Rangers	2017–18	Championship	2	0	0	0	0	0	—		2	0
Queens Park Rangers	2018–19	Championship	42	0	3	0	1	0	—		46	0
Queens Park Rangers	2019–20	Championship	27	0	1	0	0	0	—		28	0
Queens Park Rangers	2020–21	Championship	5	0	0	0	1	0	—		4	0
Queens Park Rangers	Total		77	0	5	0	2	0	0	0	84	0
Bishop's Stortford (loan)	2013–14	Conference South	4	0	0	0	—		0	0	4	0
Accrington Stanley (loan)	2014–15	League Two	5	0	0	0	0	0	1 (Note: Appearance(s) in Football League Trophy)	0	6	0
Morecambe (loan)	2014–15	League Two	0	0	1	0	0	0	0	0	1	0
Stevenage (loan)	2015–16	League Two	0	0	0	0	0	0	0	0	0	0
Bristol Rovers (loan)	2016–17	League One	19	0	0	0	0	0	0	0	19	0
Blackpool (loan)	2017–18	League One	17	0	0	0	0	0	1 (Note: Appearance(s) in the EFL Trophy)	0	18	0
Gillingham (loan)	2020–21	League One	2	0	0	0	0	0	0	0	2	0
Doncaster Rovers (loan)	2020–21	League One	8	0	1	0	0	0	0	0	9	0
Middlesbrough	2021–22	Championship	34	0	4	0	1	0	—		39	0
Reading (loan)	2022–23	Championship	41	0	1	0	0	0	—		42	0
Southampton	2023–24	Championship	0	0	4	0	0	0	0	0	4	0
Southampton	2024–25	Premier League	3	0	0	0	1	0	—		4	0
Southampton	Total		3	0	4	0	1	0	0	0	8	0
Bristol City	2025–26	Championship	0	0	2	0	2	0	—		4	0
Sheffield Wednesday (loan)	2025–26	Championship	2	0	—		—		—		2	0
Sheffield Wednesday	2026–27	League One	10	0	0	0	2	0	0	0	12	0
Career total			222	0	18	0	8	0	2	0	250	0

== Honours ==
Southampton

- EFL Championship play-offs: 2024
