= Luke Freeman =

English footballer (born 1992)

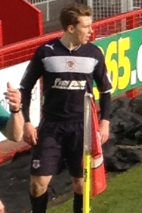
- Freeman with Stevenage in 2013

Personal information
- Full name: Luke Anthony Freeman
- Date of birth: 22 March 1992 (age 34)
- Place of birth: Dartford, England
- Height: 5 ft 9 in (1.75 m)
- Positions: Attacking midfielder; winger

Youth career
- 2001–2003: Charlton Athletic
- 2003–2007: Gillingham

Senior career*
Years	Team	Apps	(Gls)
2007–2008	Gillingham	1	(0)
2008–2012	Arsenal	0	(0)
2010	→ Yeovil Town (loan)	13	(2)
2011–2012	→ Stevenage (loan)	7	(1)
2012–2014	Stevenage	103	(14)
2014–2017	Bristol City	105	(10)
2017–2019	Queens Park Rangers	104	(14)
2019–2022	Sheffield United	16	(0)
2020–2021	→ Nottingham Forest (loan)	23	(1)
2022	→ Millwall (loan)	1	(0)
2022–2023	Luton Town	26	(2)
2024	Barnet	11	(1)

International career
2008	England U16	4	(1)
2008–2009	England U17	15	(4)
- * Club domestic league appearances and goals as of 12:48, 23 April 2024 (UTC)

Luke Anthony Freeman (born 22 March 1992) is an English professional footballer who plays as an attacking midfielder or winger.

Freeman joined Charlton Athletic's youth system before moving to Gillingham at the age of 11. He made his first-team debut for Gillingham aged 15, becoming the youngest player to appear in the FA Cup. In January 2008, he signed for Arsenal and subsequently gained first-team experience on loan at League One clubs Yeovil Town and Stevenage, joining the latter permanently in January 2012. He scored 17 goals across three seasons at Stevenage and was named the club's Player of the Year for the 2013–14 season. Freeman signed for Bristol City in June 2014, helping the club win the Football League Trophy and the League One title in his first season.

He joined Championship club Queens Park Rangers in January 2017, scoring 15 goals in 121 appearances and earning the club's Player of the Year award for 2018–19. In July 2019, Freeman moved to Premier League club Sheffield United for a club-record fee, playing a peripheral role, and later spent time on loan at Nottingham Forest and Millwall. He joined Luton Town in July 2022, contributing to their promotion to the Premier League via the play-offs, and spent the 2023–24 season at Barnet. Internationally, Freeman has represented England at under-16 and under-17 level.

== Early life ==
Born in Dartford, Kent, Freeman grew up in East London. His family relocated to Gravesend, Kent, where Freeman attended St John's Secondary School.

== Club career ==
=== Early career ===
Freeman joined Charlton Athletic's academy in 2001 after being scouted playing Sunday league youth football. He spent two years at Charlton before being released for "being too small". Freeman joined Gillingham at the age of 11. He made his first-team debut for Gillingham in an FA Cup tie against Barnet on 10 November 2007, aged 15 years and 233 days, replacing Efe Sodje as an 80th-minute substitute. His debut set two records: he became both Gillingham's youngest-ever first-team player and the youngest player to appear in the FA Cup, surpassing records previously held by Billy Hughes and Lee Holmes respectively. Three days later, he featured in Gillingham's 4–0 home victory against Dagenham & Redbridge in the Football League Trophy, coming on as a 74th-minute substitute. He made his first league appearance on 24 November 2007, again as a substitute, in a 2–1 victory against Hartlepool United, becoming Gillingham's youngest league debutant. After three senior appearances, Freeman trialled with Arsenal, Newcastle United, and West Ham United in December 2007, with all three clubs expressing interest in signing him.

=== Arsenal ===
Freeman joined Premier League club Arsenal on 30 January 2008, for a fee reported to be in the region of £200,000. He signed a two-year contract as part of Arsenal's youth academy under the club's scholar scheme. Upon his arrival, Arsenal manager Arsène Wenger described the player as "a very interesting prospect". During the 2008–09 season, he scored seven goals in 15 appearances for the under-18 team, as well as making one substitute appearance for the reserve team. Freeman signed his first professional contract with Arsenal on 8 April 2009. The following season, he scored 16 goals in 24 appearances, including two goals in the Academy League final, a 5–3 victory against Nottingham Forest. He also scored one goal in 11 reserve team appearances, most of which came during the latter stages of the season.

Ahead of the 2010–11 season, Freeman joined League One club Yeovil Town on a loan agreement until 31 December 2010. On joining the club, Freeman stated that he was now "getting to an age" where he wanted first-team experience, and that he hoped the loan move would help him break into Arsenal's senior team by the end of the season. He scored on his debut against Leyton Orient on 7 August 2010, the winning goal in first-half stoppage time in a 2–1 victory. Freeman made 15 appearances and scored twice during the first half of the 2010–11 season. His loan spell was curtailed due to injury, and he returned to Arsenal in November 2010. After regaining fitness, Freeman featured regularly for the reserve team, scoring four goals over the course of the season. He signed a new contract with Arsenal in April 2011.

=== Stevenage ===
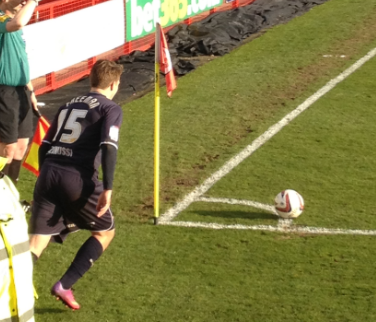
Freeman taking a corner kick playing for Stevenage in March 2013

Freeman joined League One club Stevenage on loan from 17 November 2011 to 8 January 2012, with an option to extend the agreement. He made his debut two days later, playing 86 minutes in a 0–0 away draw with Leyton Orient. Freeman scored his first goal for the club in a 6–1 away victory over Colchester United on 26 December, coming on as a 57th-minute substitute and scoring Stevenage's fifth goal with a "powerful close-range strike". He signed for Stevenage on a permanent basis on 10 January 2012 for an undisclosed fee and on a contract until 2014. On signing for Stevenage, Freeman stated: "There were a couple of bids elsewhere, but I really enjoyed my time on loan here, so I am delighted to stay. Now it's time to build a career for myself, it's time to move on and try and make myself a better player". His first appearance after signing permanently came in a 5–1 away victory at Rochdale, in which he scored twice. He made 32 appearances during the season, scoring seven times, as Stevenage reached the League One play-off semi-finals.

Freeman struggled for consistency during the 2012–13 season and was regularly used as a substitute. He made 43 appearances in all competitions, scoring two goals. Freeman remained at Stevenage for the 2013–14 season and scored his first goal in Stevenage's 2–1 extra-time defeat to Premier League club Everton in the League Cup on 28 August 2013. In December 2013, Stevenage confirmed that Freeman had been the subject of transfer interest from Championship clubs ahead of the 2014 January transfer window and stated that they would be willing to listen to offers. No transfer materialised, and Freeman ultimately saw out the season at the club. A "stunning brace" in a 3–2 comeback victory away at Bradford City on 1 March 2014 marked his first goals in nearly four months. He ended the season by scoring three goals in the final five league matches in April 2014. Freeman made 54 appearances and scored eight goals during the season, as Stevenage were relegated to League Two. He was voted Stevenage's Player of the Year at the club's end-of-season awards. With Freeman's contract due to expire in June, Stevenage exercised a 12-month extension clause to retain him.

=== Bristol City ===
Despite Stevenage activating the 12-month clause in Freeman's contract, he signed for League One club Bristol City on 26 June 2014, joining for a six-figure fee on a three-year contract. Freeman made his debut for the club on the opening day of the 2014–15 season, playing the first 77 minutes in a 2–1 away victory at Sheffield United, and scored his first goal in a 1–1 draw with Rochdale on 23 August 2014. Freeman scored three times across five matches between February and March 2015, with all three goals coming in away victories against Doncaster Rovers, Leyton Orient and Yeovil Town respectively. During the season, Freeman also made five appearances in the Football League Trophy, including a starting appearance in the final, a 2–0 victory against Walsall at Wembley Stadium on 22 March 2015. All seven of Freeman's goals that season came in away matches, playing 56 times in all competitions as Bristol City earned promotion to the Championship, finishing the season as champions by an eight-point margin.

Freeman started in Bristol City's first match back in the Championship at the start of the 2015–16 season, playing the full 90 minutes in a 2–0 defeat away to Sheffield Wednesday. A week later, on 15 August 2015, he received the first red card of his career for a high-footed challenge on Harlee Dean in a 4–2 home defeat to Brentford at Ashton Gate. After serving a three-match suspension, Freeman returned to the first team in September 2015, scoring later that month in a 2–2 away draw against Ipswich Town with his effort deflecting off Tommy Smith. It proved to be Freeman's only goal of the season, making 44 appearances in all competitions as Bristol City consolidated their place back in the Championship.

Freeman began the 2016–17 season at Bristol City in the final year of his three-year contract and was a regular starter during the first half of the season. He scored his only goal of the season in Bristol City's 4–0 victory against Fulham at Craven Cottage on 24 September 2016. Manager Lee Johnson stated he was resigned to losing Freeman in the January transfer window after the player rejected a new contract offer. A year after his departure from Bristol City, Freeman claimed the club had not been forthcoming with a suitable deal: "I was waiting over eight months for a contract that was so-called going to be offered to me. When they did it was really nowhere near what anyone else was on. So it was out of my hands. I probably wouldn't have left if they had offered me the contract they said they were going to offer me earlier". Freeman made 121 appearances and scored 10 goals during his two and a half years at the club.

=== Queens Park Rangers ===
Freeman signed for fellow Championship club Queens Park Rangers on 30 January 2017 for an undisclosed fee, agreeing to a three-and-a-half-year contract. On signing Freeman, QPR manager Ian Holloway stated: "I've been a great admirer of Luke and his creativity is something we'll really feel the benefits of". He made his QPR debut two days later, on 1 February 2017, coming on as a 66th-minute substitute in a 2–2 draw with Newcastle United at St James' Park. He scored his first goal for QPR in his next appearance, halving the deficit in an eventual 2–1 home defeat to Huddersfield Town on 11 February 2017. Freeman made 16 appearances during the second half of the season, scoring twice.

The 2017–18 season served as Freeman's first full season at QPR, with the club still competing in the Championship. He scored his first goal of the season on 9 September 2017, firing a low shot from outside the area to double QPR's advantage in an eventual 2–1 home victory over Ipswich Town, a result that preserved their unbeaten start at Loftus Road. He went on to score five times in 48 appearances that season. His 12 assists ranked third in the Championship that year. During the 2018–19 season, he scored eight goals and registered six assists, a contribution that saw him named QPR's Player of the Year at the club's end-of-season awards on 26 April 2019.

=== Sheffield United ===
Following his most productive season at QPR, Freeman joined newly promoted Premier League club Sheffield United for an undisclosed club-record fee on 3 July 2019. He made his Sheffield United debut in the club's first match back in the Premier League, coming on as a 78th-minute substitute in a 1–1 draw away at Bournemouth on 10 August 2019. Freeman played a peripheral role during the season, making 16 appearances, including seven starts.

==== Loan spells ====
Ahead of the 2020–21 season, Freeman joined Championship club Nottingham Forest on a season-long loan agreement, which included an option for a permanent transfer. He debuted for the club in a 1–0 defeat to Barnsley in the EFL Cup on 5 September 2020. Freeman scored once that season, Nottingham Forest's first goal of the league campaign, in a 2–1 defeat to former club Bristol City on 3 October 2020. His season was disrupted by injuries, including hernia surgery midway through the season. He made 25 appearances during the loan spell, with Forest ultimately opting not to make the move permanent.

Freeman returned to Sheffield United ahead of the 2021–22 season, scoring his first goal for the club in a 2–1 EFL Cup victory against Derby County on 24 August 2021. After making nine appearances during the first half of the season, he joined fellow Championship club Millwall on loan for the remainder of the season. Having played just 13 minutes for Millwall as a substitute against Fulham, Freeman suffered a hamstring injury that ruled him out for the remainder of the season. He was released by Sheffield United upon the expiry of his contract in June 2022.

=== Luton Town ===
A free agent ahead of the 2022–23 season, Freeman signed for Championship club Luton Town on 4 July 2022. He made his debut in the club's opening match of the season, a 0–0 draw with Birmingham City, and scored his first goal in their 2–1 away victory against Cardiff City. Freeman featured regularly during the first half of the season before sustaining a groin injury in January 2023, which ruled him out for three months. He made 26 appearances during the season, scoring twice, as Luton achieved promotion to the Premier League via the play-offs. Having not featured in the opening month of the 2023–24 season, he left the club by mutual consent on 29 August 2023.

=== Barnet ===
Without a club following his departure from Luton, Freeman joined Barnet of the National League on 31 January 2024. He scored one goal in 14 appearances in all competitions for the club. At the season's conclusion, Barnet announced that contract negotiations were ongoing, but Freeman ultimately did not appear on the squad list for the following season.

== International career ==
Freeman made his debut for the England under-16 team in the 2008 Montaigu Tournament in France, scoring on his debut in a 3–1 victory against Japan. Having secured six points out of nine, England won their group, and subsequently beat their French counterparts in the final on penalties, Freeman playing 78 minutes of the match.

He was called up to the England under-17 squad for the first time ahead of the 2008 Nordic Tournament, held in Sweden. He played in all three games during the tournament, with England failing to qualify for the final due to Norway's superior goal-scoring record. He earned 15 caps for the under-17 team between 2008 and 2009, scoring four goals.

== Style of play ==
Freeman was initially deployed solely as a winger in the early stages of his career. Left-footed, he has generally been used on the left side for the majority of his career. At Bristol City, he was often given a free role, drifting centrally and attempting shots from distance. During his time at QPR, Freeman was used in more central roles as part of a midfield three under Ian Holloway. Holloway described Freeman as having a "wand of a left foot", and highlighted his creativity and eagerness to receive the ball as key attributes. Freeman is also a set-piece specialist, proficient from corners and free kicks.

== Career statistics ==
As of match played 27 April 2024

Appearances and goals by club, season and competition
Club	Season	League			FA Cup		League Cup		Other		Total	
Club	Season	Division	Apps	Goals	Apps	Goals	Apps	Goals	Apps	Goals	Apps	Goals
Gillingham	2007–08	League One	1	0	1	0	0	0	1 (Note: Appearance(s) in Football League Trophy)	0	3	0
Arsenal	2007–08	Premier League	0	0	0	0	0	0	0	0	0	0
Arsenal	2008–09	Premier League	0	0	0	0	0	0	0	0	0	0
Arsenal	2009–10	Premier League	0	0	0	0	0	0	0	0	0	0
Arsenal	2010–11	Premier League	0	0	0	0	0	0	0	0	0	0
Arsenal	2011–12	Premier League	0	0	0	0	0	0	0	0	0	0
Arsenal	Total		0	0	0	0	0	0	0	0	0	0
Yeovil Town (loan)	2010–11	League One	13	2	0	0	1	0	1	0	15	2
Stevenage	2011–12	League One	26	7	4	0	0	0	2 (Note: Appearances in 2012 League One play-offs)	0	32	7
Stevenage	2012–13	League One	39	2	1	0	2	0	1	0	43	2
Stevenage	2013–14	League One	45	6	4	1	2	1	3	0	54	8
Stevenage	Total		110	15	9	1	4	1	6	0	129	17
Bristol City	2014–15	League One	46	7	5	0	0	0	5	0	56	7
Bristol City	2015–16	Championship	41	1	2	0	1	0	—		44	1
Bristol City	2016–17	Championship	18	2	0	0	3	0	—		21	2
Bristol City	Total		105	10	7	0	4	0	5	0	121	10
Queens Park Rangers	2016–17	Championship	16	2	0	0	—		—		16	2
Queens Park Rangers	2017–18	Championship	45	5	1	0	2	0	—		48	5
Queens Park Rangers	2018–19	Championship	43	7	4	0	1	1	—		48	8
Queens Park Rangers	Total		104	14	5	0	3	1	0	0	112	15
Sheffield United	2019–20	Premier League	11	0	3	0	2	0	—		16	0
Sheffield United	2020–21	Premier League	0	0	0	0	0	0	—		0	0
Sheffield United	2021–22	Championship	5	0	1	0	3	1	—		9	1
Sheffield United	Total		16	0	4	0	5	1	0	0	25	1
Nottingham Forest (loan)	2020–21	Championship	23	1	1	0	1	0	—		25	1
Millwall (loan)	2021–22	Championship	1	0	0	0	0	0	—		1	0
Luton Town	2022–23	Championship	26	2	0	0	0	0	—		26	2
Barnet	2023–24	National League	11	1	0	0	—		3 (Note: Two appearances in FA Trophy; one appearance in 2024 National League playoffs)	0	14	1
Career total			397	45	26	1	18	3	16	0	469	49

== Honours ==
Bristol City

- Football League One: 2014–15
- Football League Trophy: 2014–15

England U16

- Montaigu Tournament: 2008

Individual

- Football League Young Player of the Month: April 2012
- Stevenage Player of the Year: 2013–14
- PFA Team of the Year: 2014–15 League One
- Queens Park Rangers Player of the Year: 2018–19
