= Toni Leistner =

German footballer (born 1990)

Personal information
- Full name: Toni Andreas Leistner
- Date of birth: 19 August 1990 (age 36)
- Place of birth: Dresden, East Germany
- Height: 1.90 m (6 ft 3 in)
- Position: Centre-back

Youth career
- Verkehrsbetriebe Dresden
- –2008: Borea Dresden

Senior career*
Years	Team	Apps	(Gls)
2008–2010	SC Borea Dresden	26	(2)
2010–2014	Dynamo Dresden II	53	(3)
2010–2014	Dynamo Dresden	21	(0)
2013	→ Hallescher FC (loan)	13	(0)
2014–2018	Union Berlin	115	(4)
2018–2020	Queens Park Rangers	65	(2)
2020	→ 1. FC Köln (loan)	13	(0)
2020–2021	Hamburger SV	19	(1)
2021–2023	Sint-Truiden	49	(2)
2023–2026	Hertha BSC	76	(1)
- * Club domestic league appearances and goals as of 18 May 2026

Toni Andreas Leistner (born 19 August 1990) is a German professional footballer who plays as a centre-back.

== Career ==
Leistner began his career with Dynamo Dresden, who he joined in 2010 from Borea Dresden, primarily as a reserve-team player. After a few appearances on the bench he made his first-team debut in April 2011, when he replaced Florian Jungwirth in a 3. Liga match against SpVgg Unterhaching. Dynamo were promoted at the end of the 2010–11 season, and Leistner made three appearances in the 2. Bundesliga the following year. In January 2013 he signed for Hallescher FC on a six-month loan. He returned to Dynamo for the 2013–14 season, and became a first-team regular after the winter break, but was unable to prevent the club being relegated to the 3. Liga. At the end of the season, he signed for Union Berlin.

=== Queens Park Rangers ===
On 1 July 2018, Leistner signed for Queens Park Rangers on a three-year deal following the expiry of his contract in Germany. He scored his first goal for the club in a 1–0 win against Reading on 2 October 2018.

Leistner was ever-present in the Rangers defense in his first season at the club, appearing 45 times in all competitions.

After being in and out of team under by new manager Mark Warburton on 30 January 2020, Leistner was loaned out to 1. FC Köln until the end of the 2019–20 season.

On 28 August 2020, Leistner had his contract terminated by mutual consent. The same day he became a new Hamburger SV player.

=== Hertha ===
On 7 July 2023, Leistner signed a two-year deal with Hertha BSC.

== Personal life ==
During the COVID-19 pandemic in spring 2020, Leistner donated one month's salary to his youth team SC Borea Dresden.

== Career statistics ==
As of match played 10 November 2018

Appearances and goals by club, season and competition
Club	Season	League			National cup		League cup		Other		Total	
Club	Season	Division	Apps	Goals	Apps	Goals	Apps	Goals	Apps	Goals	Apps	Goals
Dynamo Dresden	2010–11	3. Liga	1	0	0	0	—		0	0	1	0
Dynamo Dresden	2011–12	2. Bundesliga	3	0	0	0	—		0	0	3	0
Dynamo Dresden	2012–13	2. Bundesliga	1	0	0	0	—		0	0	1	0
Dynamo Dresden	2013–14	2. Bundesliga	16	0	0	0	—		0	0	16	0
Dynamo Dresden	Total		21	0	0	0	—		0	0	21	0
Hallescher FC (loan)	2012–13	3. Liga	13	0	0	0	—		0	0	13	0
Union Berlin	2014–15	2. Bundesliga	30	1	1	0	—		0	0	31	1
Union Berlin	2015–16	2. Bundesliga	26	1	0	0	—		0	0	26	1
Union Berlin	2016–17	2. Bundesliga	30	1	2	0	—		0	0	32	1
Union Berlin	2017–18	2. Bundesliga	29	1	1	0	—		0	0	30	1
Union Berlin	Total		115	4	4	0	—		0	0	119	4
Queens Park Rangers	2018–19	EFL Championship	43	2	0	0	1	0	—		44	2
Queens Park Rangers	2019-2020	EFL Championship	22	0	3	0	—		—		25	0
Career total			165	4	4	0	1	0	0	0	222	6
