= 2018–19 Queens Park Rangers F.C. season =

English football club season

Queens Park Rangers
2018–19 season
- Owner: Tune Group
- Chairman: Amit Bhatia
- Manager: Steve McClaren (until 1 April); John Eustace (from 1 April) (caretaker manager)
- Stadium: Loftus Road
- EFL Championship: 19th
- FA Cup: Fifth Round (vs. Watford)
- EFL Cup: Third Round (vs. Blackpool)
- Top goalscorer: League: 3 players (7); All: Nahki Wells (9)
- Highest home attendance: 17,609 vs. Brentford (10 Nov. Championship)
- Lowest home attendance: 4,021 vs. Peterborough United (14 Aug. EFL Cup)
- Average home league attendance: 13,866
- Biggest win: 4–0 Vs Swansea City (3 April 2019)
- Biggest defeat: 1-7 Vs West Bromwich Albion (18 August 2018)
Home colours	Away colours

The 2018–19 season is Queens Park Rangers' fourth consecutive season in the Championship following their relegation from the Premier League in the 2014–15 season. Along with the Championship, the club will participate in the FA Cup and the EFL Cup.

== Players ==
=== First team squad ===
As of 5 May 2019

No.	Name	Nat	Position	Since	Date of birth (age)	Signed from	Games	Goals
Goalkeepers
1	Matt Ingram	(England)	GK	2016	18 December 1993 (age 32)	(England) Wycombe Wanderers	19	0
13	Joe Lumley	(England)	GK	2013	15 February 1995 (age 31)	(England) Queens Park Rangers Academy	49	0
26	Seny Dieng	(Switzerland)	GK	2016	23 November 1994 (age 31)	(Germany) MSV Duisburg	0	0
Defenders
2	Darnell Furlong	(England)	RB	2014	31 October 1995 (age 30)	(England) Queens Park Rangers Academy	71	2
3	Jake Bidwell	(England)	LB	2016	21 March 1993 (age 33)	(England) Brentford	130	4
4	Grant Hall	(England)	CB/CM	2015	29 October 1991 (age 34)	(England) Tottenham Hotspur	100	1
5	Geoff Cameron	(United States)	CB/CM	2018	11 July 1985 (age 41)	On loan from (England) Stoke City	18	1
15	Alex Baptiste	(England)	CB	2017	31 January 1986 (age 40)	(England) Middlesbrough	35	0
22	Àngel Rangel	(Spain)	RB	2018	28 November 1982 (age 43)	(Wales) Swansea City	20	2
24	Osman Kakay	(Sierra Leone)	RB	2015	25 August 1997 (age 29)	(England) Queens Park Rangers Academy	12	0
28	Niko Hämäläinen	(Finland)	LB/CB	2014	5 March 1997 (age 29)	(United States) FC Dallas	6	0
29	Giles Phillips	(United States)	CB	2017	22 June 1997 (age 29)	(United States) FC Barrington	0	0
33	Joel Lynch	(Wales)	CB/LB	2016	3 October 1987 (age 38)	(England) Huddersfield Town	95	7
37	Toni Leistner (C)	(Germany)	CB	2018	19 August 1990 (age 36)	(Germany) FC Union Berlin	45	2
Midfielders
6	Sean Goss	(England)	CM	2017	1 October 1995 (age 30)	(England) Manchester United	7	0
7	Luke Freeman	(England)	AM/RM/LM	2017	22 March 1992 (age 34)	(England) Bristol City	112	15
8	Jordan Cousins	(England)	CM/RM/LM	2016	6 March 1994 (age 32)	(England) Charlton Athletic	70	1
11	Josh Scowen	(England)	CM	2017	29 April 1993 (age 33)	(England) Barnsley	82	3
14	Ryan Manning	(Republic of Ireland)	CM/LM	2015	14 June 1996 (age 30)	(Republic of Ireland) Galway United	50	3
19	Ilias Chair	(Morocco)	AM/RM/LM	2017	30 October 1997 (age 28)	(Belgium) Lierse	15	1
20	Bright Osayi-Samuel	(Nigeria)	RW/LW	2017	31 December 1997 (age 28)	(England) Blackpool	51	4
21	Massimo Luongo	(Australia)	CM/AM/DM	2015	25 September 1992 (age 34)	(England) Swindon Town	151	10
23	Paweł Wszołek	(Poland)	RW/LW/RB	2016	30 April 1992 (age 34)	(Italy) Hellas Verona	113	11
25	David Wheeler	(England)	RW/LW	2017	4 October 1990 (age 35)	(England) Exeter City	9	1
27	Olamide Shodipo	(Republic of Ireland)	RW/LW	2015	5 July 1997 (age 29)	(England) Queens Park Rangers Academy	15	0
30	Charlie Owens	(Northern Ireland)	CM/DM	2017	7 December 1997 (age 28)	(England) Tottenham Hotspur	1	0
44	Faysal Bettache	(England)	RW	2018	7 July 2000 (age 26)	(England) Queens Park Rangers Academy	1	0
Forwards
9	Conor Washington	(Northern Ireland)	CF	2016	18 May 1992 (age 34)	(England) Peterborough United	98	14
10	Eberechi Eze	(England)	CF/AM	2016	29 June 1998 (age 28)	(England) Millwall	63	6
16	Tomer Hemed	(Israel)	CF	2018	2 May 1987 (age 39)	On loan from (England) Brighton & Hove Albion	28	7
17	Matt Smith	(England)	CF	2017	7 June 1989 (age 37)	(England) Fulham	101	23
18	Aramide Oteh	(England)	CF	2017	10 September 1998 (age 28)	(England) Tottenham Hotspur	11	2
32	Nahki Wells	(Bermuda)	CF	2018	1 June 1990 (age 36)	On loan from (England) Burnley	42	9
34	Lewis Walker	(England)	CF	2018	14 April 1999 (age 27)	(England) Derby County	3	0
38	Paul Smyth	(Northern Ireland)	CF	2017	10 September 1997 (age 29)	(Northern Ireland) Linfield	19	2
40	Idrissa Sylla	(Guinea)	CF	2016	3 December 1990 (age 35)	(Belgium) Anderlecht	64	17

== Kit ==
Errea continued as manufacturers of QPR's kit. Bookmaker Royal Panda continued as kit sponsors.

Home	Home alt.	Home 2nd alt.	Home 3rd alt.	Away	Away alt.

=== Kit information ===
QPR agreed a multi-year partnership with Erreà as the official technical kit suppliers, the 2018/19 season will be the second year of the deal. The kits will be 100 per-cent bespoke designs for the duration of the deal.

The 2018/19 season will be the second-year of a three-year shirt sponsorship deal with online casino Royal Panda.

== New contracts ==
No.	Position	Nationality	Player	Contract length	Contract end	Date	Source
—	FW	(Nigeria)	Odysseus Alfa	Unknown	Unknown	Unknown (Note: The date of the contract extension is unknown as it was not reported; however, it was reported that the player was offered an extension. The player then continued to play for QPR after the expiry of his previous contract.)	N/A
45	GK	(Poland)	Marcin Brzozowski	Unknown	Unknown	Unknown	N/A
26	GK	(Switzerland)	Seny Dieng	Unknown	Unknown	Unknown (Note: The date of the contract extension is unknown as it was not reported; however, it was reported that the player was offered an extension. The player then continued to play for QPR after the expiry of his previous contract.)	N/A
24	DF	(Sierra Leone)	Osman Kakay	Unknown	Unknown	Unknown	N/A
29	DF	(United States)	Giles Phillips	Unknown	Unknown	Unknown	N/A
—	DF	(England)	Jack Williams	Unknown	Unknown	Unknown	N/A
18	FW	(England)	Aramide Oteh	1 year	2019	3 May 2018	
43	FW	(England)	Deshane Dalling	1 year	2019	23 May 2018	
—	FW	(Portugal)	Hugo Cardoso	1 year	2019	22 June 2018	
—	MF	(England)	Chay Tilt	1 year	2019	5 July 2018	
30	MF	(England)	Charlie Owens	1 year	2019	6 July 2018	
13	GK	(England)	Joe Lumley	3 years	2021	17 July 2018	
2	DF	(England)	Darnell Furlong	3 years	2021	3 August 2018	
10	FW	(England)	Eberechi Eze	3 years	2021	7 August 2018	
18	FW	(England)	Aramide Oteh	3 years	2021	4 September 2018	
7	MF	(England)	Luke Freeman	2.5 years	2021	26 November 2018	
24	DF	(Sierra Leone)	Osman Kakay	2.5 years	2021	3 December 2018	
22	DF	(Spain)	Àngel Rangel	6 months	2019	7 December 2018	
38	FW	(Northern Ireland)	Paul Smyth	2.5 years	2021	18 January 2019	
—	FW	(Nigeria)	Odysseus Alfa	1.5 years	2020	29 January 2019	
28	DF	(United States)	Giles Phillips	1.5 years	2020	1 February 2019	
29	DF	(Finland)	Niko Hämäläinen	1.5 years	2020	6 February 2019	
27	MF	(Republic of Ireland)	Olamide Shodipo	1 year	2020	1 May 2019	

== Transfers ==
=== Transfers in ===
Date from	Position	Nationality	Name	From	Fee	Ref.
1 July 2018	RB	(England)	Joe Felix	Fulham	Free transfer	
1 July 2018	CB	(England)	Charlie Fox	Academy	Trainee	
1 July 2018	CB	(Germany)	Toni Leistner	(Germany) Union Berlin	Free transfer	
4 July 2018	CB	(England)	Ben Wells	West Ham	Free transfer	
6 August 2018	CB	(England)	Ali Omar	Free agent	Free transfer	
15 August 2018	RB	(Spain)	Àngel Rangel	(Wales) Swansea City	Free transfer	
6 November 2018	CB	(England)	Charlie Rowan	Watford	Free transfer	
6 November 2018	FW	(England)	Lewis Walker	Derby County	Free transfer	
1 March 2019	LB	(England)	Franklin Domi	Enfield Borough	Free transfer	

=== Loans in ===
Date from	Position	Nationality	Name	From	Until	Ref.
23 August 2018	CF	(Israel)	Tomer Hemed	Brighton & Hove Albion	31 May 2019	
23 August 2018	CF	(Bermuda)	Nahki Wells	Burnley	31 May 2019	
31 August 2018	DF	(United States)	Geoff Cameron	Stoke City	31 May 2019	

=== Transfers out ===
Date from	Position	Nationality	Name	To	Fee	Ref.
1 July 2018	CF	(England)	Brandon Adams	Enfield Town	Released	
1 July 2018	CM	(Nigeria)	Romeo Akinola	Free agent	Released	
1 July 2018	CF	(England)	Jay Emmanuel-Thomas	(Thailand) PTT Rayong	Released	
1 July 2018	CB	(England)	Alex Finney	Maidstone United	Released	
1 July 2018	GK	(England)	Conor Hudnott	Free agent	Released	
1 July 2018	RW	(Scotland)	Jamie Mackie	Oxford United	Released	
1 July 2018	CB	(England)	Nedum Onuoha	(United States) Real Salt Lake	Released	
1 July 2018	CM	(Northern Ireland)	Chris Paul	Free agent	Released	
1 July 2018	RB	(England)	James Perch	Scunthorpe United	Released	
1 July 2018	LB	(England)	Jack Robinson	Nottingham Forest	Released	
1 July 2018	GK	(England)	Alex Smithies	(Wales) Cardiff City	£3,500,000	
1 July 2018	AM	(England)	Zenon Stylianides	(Cyprus) Omonia Aradippou	Released	
1 July 2018	CM	(Australia)	Joshua Wallen	F.C. United of Manchester	Released	
31 August 2018	CF	(Northern Ireland)	Conor Washington	Sheffield United	Released	
5 January 2019	CF	(Guinea)	Idrissa Sylla	(Belgium) Zulte Waregem	Undisclosed	
7 January 2019	CB	(England)	Jack Williams	Free agent	Released	
8 January 2019	FW	(England)	Kingsley Eshun	Free agent	Released	
16 January 2019	FW	(Portugal)	Hugo Cardoso	Free agent	Released	
31 May 2019	GK	(England)	Myles Bowman	Free agent	Released	
31 May 2019	LB	(England)	Caden Genovesi	Free agent	Released	
31 May 2019	CB	(Grenada)	Kraig Noel-McLeod	Free agent	Released	
31 May 2019	CM	(England)	Mickel Platt	Free agent	Released	
31 May 2019	CM	(England)	Aiden Mesias	Free agent	Released	
31 May 2019	RW	(England)	Khaliq Raymond-Callender	Free agent	Released	
31 May 2019	CM	(England)	Marcus Brooks	Free agent	Released	
31 May 2019	GK	(England)	Harvey White	Free agent	Released	
31 May 2019	CB	(England)	Ali Omar	Free agent	Released	
31 May 2019	RB	(England)	Joe Felix	Free agent	Released	
31 May 2019	LB	(England)	Charlie Fox	Free agent	Released	
31 May 2019	RW	(England)	Chay Tilt	Free agent	Released	

=== Loans out ===
Start date	Position	Nationality	Name	To	End date	Ref.
3 August 2018	GK	(Switzerland)	Seny Dieng	Stevenage	5 January 2019	
7 August 2018	RM	(England)	David Wheeler	Portsmouth	24 January 2019	
16 August 2018	CM	(Republic of Ireland)	Ryan Manning	Rotherham United	31 December 2018	
30 August 2018	DF	(England)	Charlie Fox	Wycombe Wanderers	1 January 2019	
15 November 2018	GK	(England)	Matt Ingram	Wycombe Wanderers	22 November 2018	
11 December 2018	RB	(England)	Joe Felix	Hartley Wintney	7 January 2019	
11 December 2018	AM	(England)	Mickel Platt	Hartley Wintney	Work experience	
10 January 2019	GK	(Switzerland)	Seny Dieng	(Scotland) Dundee	31 May 2019	
25 January 2019	FW	(Northern Ireland)	Paul Smyth	Accrington Stanley	31 May 2019	
25 January 2019	RM	(England)	David Wheeler	Milton Keynes Dons	31 May 2019	
29 January 2019	FW	(Nigeria)	Odysseus Alfa	(Spain) Atlético Baleares	31 May 2019	
30 January 2019	CF	(England)	Aramide Oteh	Walsall	31 May 2019	
31 January 2019	DF	(England)	Alex Baptiste	Luton Town	31 May 2019	
31 January 2019	DM	(Morocco)	Ilias Chair	Stevenage	31 May 2019	
31 January 2019	CM	(England)	Sean Goss	(Scotland) St Johnstone	31 May 2019	
31 January 2019	DM	(Northern Ireland)	Charlie Owens	Wycombe Wanderers	31 May 2019	
12 February 2019	DF	(England)	Ali Omar	Grantham Town	31 March 2019	
22 February 2019	CB	(England)	Charlie Fox	Basingstoke Town	22 March 2019	
25 February 2019	LB	(Finland)	Niko Hämäläinen	(United States) Los Angeles FC	July 2019	
28 March 2019	GK	(England)	Myles Bowman	Torquay United	31 May 2019	
29 March 2019	RB	(England)	Joe Felix	Burgess Hill Town	31 May 2019	

== Friendlies ==
For the 2018/19 season, QPR announced pre-season friendlies against Charlton Athletic, Barnet, Staines Town, AFC Wimbledon, 1899 Hoffenheim and FC Union Berlin.

Win Draw Loss

7 July 2018 Friendly	Queens Park Rangers	3–3	Charlton Athletic	Harlington
10:30 BST	Eze 39'; Washington 60'; Baptiste 86'	Report	Taylor 29'; Vetokele 45+4'; Bauer 83'	Stadium: Imperial College Sports Ground; Attendance: 0
Note: Match played behind closed doors

10 July 2018 Friendly	Queens Park Rangers	3–0	Barnet	Harlington
11:00 BST	Eze 26'; Smith 37'; Chair 84'	Report		Stadium: Imperial College Sports Ground; Attendance: 0
Note: Match played behind closed doors

13 July 2018 Friendly	Staines Town	0–7	Queens Park Rangers	Staines-upon-Thames
19:45 BST		Report	Phillips 19'; Wheeler 22', 31'; Oteh 26' (pen.); Osayi-Samuel 45+1'; Sylla 52' (pen.); Kakay 57'	Stadium: Wheatsheaf Park

14 July 2018 Friendly	AFC Wimbledon	0–1	Queens Park Rangers	Norbiton, Kingston upon Thames
15:00 BST		Report	Freeman 90'	Stadium: Kingsmeadow

21 July 2018 Friendly	1899 Hoffenheim (Germany)	2–2	Queens Park Rangers	Eppingen
17:00 BST	Otto 4', 57'	Report	Leistner 80'; Manning 88'	Stadium: Hugo Koch Stadion

22 July 2018 Friendly	1899 Hoffenheim (Germany)	3–0	Queens Park Rangers	Hoffenheim Training Ground
11:00 BST	Ochs 29'; Akpoguma 53'; Szalai 77'	Report		Attendance: 0
Note: Match played behind closed doors

28 July 2018 Friendly	Queens Park Rangers	3–0	FC Union Berlin (Germany)	Shepherd's Bush
14:30 BST	Osayi-Samuel 18'; Smith 30'; Eze 59' (pen.)	Report		Stadium: Loftus Road; Attendance: 4,097

== Competitions ==
=== Overview ===
Competition	Record							
Competition	G	W	D	L	GF	GA	GD	Win %
Championship	46	14	9	23	53	71	−18	30.43
FA Cup	4	2	1	1	5	3	+2	50.00
League Cup	3	2	0	1	5	3	+2	66.67
Total	53	18	10	25	63	77	−14	33.96

Source: Competitions

=== Sky Bet Championship ===
==== League table ====
Pos	Team	Pld	W	D	L	GF	GA	GD	Pts	Promotion, qualification or relegation
16	Stoke City	46	11	22	13	45	52	−7	55	
17	Birmingham City	46	14	19	13	64	58	+6	52 (Note: Birmingham City were deducted 9 points for failure to comply with the EFL profitability and sustainability rules.)	
18	Wigan Athletic	46	13	13	20	51	64	−13	52	
19	Queens Park Rangers	46	14	9	23	53	71	−18	51	
20	Reading	46	10	17	19	49	66	−17	47	
21	Millwall	46	10	14	22	48	64	−16	44	
22	Rotherham United (R)	46	8	16	22	52	83	−31	40	Relegation to EFL League One

Source: Sky Sports Archived 25 September 2019 at the Wayback Machine
Rules for classification: 1) Points; 2) Goal difference; 3) Number of goals scored; 4) Head-to-head results
(R) Relegated

==== Result summary ====
Overall								Home						Away					
Pld	W	D	L	GF	GA	GD	Pts	W	D	L	GF	GA	GD	W	D	L	GF	GA	GD
46	14	9	23	53	71	−18	51	9	3	11	33	31	+2	5	6	12	20	40	−20

Last updated: 5 May 2019.

==== Results by matchday ====
Matchday	1	2	3	4	5	6	7	8	9	10	11	12	13	14	15	16	17	18	19	20	21	22	23	24	25	26	27	28	29	30	31	32	33	34	35	36	37	38	39	40	41	42	43	44	45	46
Ground	A	H	A	H	H	A	A	H	H	A	A	H	A	H	H	A	H	A	A	H	A	H	A	H	H	A	A	H	A	H	A	H	A	H	A	H	H	A	H	A	A	H	H	A	H	A
Result	L	L	L	L	W	D	W	W	L	L	W	D	W	W	W	L	W	D	D	L	L	W	W	W	D	D	L	L	L	L	L	L	L	W	L	D	L	D	L	L	D	W	L	L	L	W
Position	23	23	24	24	22	22	18	16	16	19	17	18	16	11	7	11	10	8	8	11	14	13	10	8	8	9	11	13	14	15	15	18	18	17	18	18	18	18	17	18	18	17	17	19	19	19

Updated to match(es) played on 27 April 2019. Source: BBC Sport
A = Away; H = Home; W = Win; D = Draw; L = Loss

==== Matches ====
Win Draw Loss

The fixtures for the 2018–19 season were announced on 21 June 2018

4 August 2018 1	Preston North End	1–0	Queens Park Rangers	Preston
15:00 BST	Browne 50'	Report	Manning (yellow card) 66'; Scowen (yellow card) 73'	Stadium: Deepdale; Attendance: 13,418; Referee: Darren England

11 August 2018 2	Queens Park Rangers	1–2	Sheffield United	Shepherd's Bush, London
15:00 BST	Eze 29'; Lynch (yellow card) 67'	Report	Sharp 43'; McGoldrick 65' (pen.)	Stadium: Loftus Road; Attendance: 14,128; Referee: Scott Duncan

18 August 2018 3	West Bromwich Albion	7–1	Queens Park Rangers	West Bromwich
15:00 BST	Brunt (yellow card) 18'; Phillips 29', 88'; Bartley (yellow card) 45+3'; Gibbs 53'; Rodriguez 56' (pen.), 82' (pen.); Gayle 67'; Robson-Kanu 90+1'	Report	Lynch 34'; Scowen (yellow card) 54'	Stadium: The Hawthorns; Attendance: 22,753; Referee: Tony Harrington

21 August 2018 4	Queens Park Rangers	0–3	Bristol City	Shepherd's Bush, London
19:45 BST	Scowen (yellow card) 56'	Report	Pisano (yellow card) 38'; Taylor 41'; Brownhill (yellow card) 48'; Weimann 50', 90'; Pack (yellow card) 70'	Stadium: Loftus Road; Attendance: 11,739; Referee: Peter Bankes

25 August 2018 5	Queens Park Rangers	1–0	Wigan Athletic	Shepherd's Bush, London
15:00 BST	Rangel (yellow card) 27'; Hemed 35' (yellow card) 71'	Report	Byrne (yellow card) 28'	Stadium: Loftus Road; Attendance: 11,564; Referee: Steve Martin

1 September 2018 6	Birmingham City	0–0	Queens Park Rangers	Birmingham
15:00 BST	Maghoma (yellow card) 31'; Pedersen (yellow card) 53'	Report		Stadium: St Andrew's; Attendance: 21,155; Referee: Jeremy Simpson

15 September 2018 7	Bolton Wanderers	1–2	Queens Park Rangers	Bolton
15:00 BST	Noone (yellow card) 14'; Magennis 69'	Report	Freeman 26'; Eze 56'	Stadium: University of Bolton Stadium; Attendance: 13,581; Referee: Oliver Langford

19 September 2018 8	Queens Park Rangers	2–0	Millwall	Shepherd's Bush, London
19:45 BST	Luongo 30'; Eze 32' (yellow card) 82'; Leistner (yellow card) 63'; Freeman (yellow card) 70'	Report	Williams (yellow card) 16'; Skalak (yellow card) 82'	Stadium: Loftus Road; Attendance: 12,398; Referee: Robert Jones

22 September 2018 9	Queens Park Rangers	0–1	Norwich City	Shepherd's Bush, London
17:30 BST		Report	Aarons (yellow card) 61'; Lewis (yellow card) 67'; Pukki 71'	Stadium: Loftus Road; Attendance: 12,843; Referee: Darren Bond

29 September 2018 10	Swansea City	3–0	Queens Park Rangers	Swansea
15:00 BST	Baker-Richardson 16'; Roberts 76'; Fulton 83'	Report	Luongo (yellow card) 26'; Bidwell (yellow card) 29'; Wells (yellow card) 76'	Stadium: Liberty Stadium; Referee: Kevin Friend

2 October 2018 11	Reading	0–1	Queens Park Rangers	Reading
20:00 BST	Meite (yellow card) 55'; Ezatolahi (yellow card) 68'; Sims (yellow card) 70'	Report	Leistner 64'	Stadium: Madejski Stadium; Attendance: 13,568; Referee: Andy Davies

6 October 2018 12	Queens Park Rangers	1–1	Derby County	Shepherd's Bush, London
15:00 BST	Rangel (yellow card) 9'; Luongo (yellow card) 37'; Cameron 48'; Leistner (yellow card) 86'	Report	Lawrence (yellow card) 9'; Marriott 24'; Bryson (yellow card) 83'	Stadium: Loftus Road; Attendance: 14,727; Referee: David Webb

20 October 2018 13	Ipswich Town	0–2	Queens Park Rangers	Ipswich
15:00 BST		Report	Gerken 13' (o.g.); Hemed 45+2' (pen.); Lynch (yellow card) 53'	Stadium: Portman Road; Attendance: 18,345; Referee: Geoff Eltringham

23 October 2018 14	Queens Park Rangers	3–0	Sheffield Wednesday	Shepherd's Bush, London
19:45 BST	Hemed 35'; Freeman 57'; Wells 83'	Report		Stadium: Loftus Road; Attendance: 12,534; Referee: John Brooks

26 October 2018 15	Queens Park Rangers	1–0	Aston Villa	Shepherd's Bush, London
19:45 BST	Lynch (yellow card) 29'; Wszołek 38' (yellow card) 80'; Luongo (yellow card) 82'	Report		Stadium: Loftus Road; Attendance: 16,036; Referee: Darren England

3 November 2018 16	Blackburn Rovers	1–0	Queens Park Rangers	Blackburn
15:00 GMT	Reed (yellow card) 19'; Smallwood (yellow card) 33'; Evans (yellow card) 56'; Dack 87' (pen.); Brereton (yellow card) 90+4'	Report	Luongo (yellow card) 4'; Eze (yellow card) 51'; Leistner (yellow card) 66'; Freeman (yellow card) 90+5'	Stadium: Ewood Park; Attendance: 13,294; Referee: Peter Bankes

10 November 2018 17	Queens Park Rangers	3–2	Brentford	Shepherd's Bush, London
15:00 GMT	Freeman (yellow card) 18'; Luongo 50'; Lynch 58'; Wells 60' (yellow card) 65'	Report	Maupay 22'; Sawyers (yellow card) 59'; Dalsgaard 81'	Stadium: Loftus Road; Attendance: 17,609; Referee: James Linington

24 November 2018 18	Stoke City	2–2	Queens Park Rangers	Stoke-on-Trent
15:00 GMT	Berahino 21'; Martins Indi (yellow card) 47'; Allen 61'	Report	Lynch (yellow card) 4'; Rangel 7', 78'; Cousins (yellow card) 34'; Leistner (yellow card) 37'; Bidwell (yellow card) 90+5'	Stadium: Britannia Stadium; Attendance: 24,291; Referee: Andy Davies

27 November 2018 19	Rotherham United	2–2	Queens Park Rangers	Rotherham
19:45 GMT	Vaulks 6'; Robertson 15'	Report	Wells 12'; Bidwell (yellow card) 23'; Wszołek (yellow card) 35'; Freeman 90+1'	Stadium: New York Stadium; Attendance: 8,018; Referee: Andy Woolmer

1 December 2018 20	Queens Park Rangers	2–3	Hull City	Shepherd's Bush, London
15:00 GMT	Wszołek 24'; Bidwell (yellow card) 78'; Lynch (yellow card) 87'; Freeman 90+2'	Report	Bowen 6', 69'; Henriksen 22'; Batty (yellow card) 73'	Stadium: Loftus Road; Attendance: 13,824; Referee: Jeremy Simpson

8 December 2018 21	Leeds United	2–1	Queens Park Rangers	Leeds
15:00 GMT	Klich (yellow card) 33'; Roofe 45+3', 53' (pen.); Phillips (yellow card) 63'	Report	Wells 26'; Scowen (yellow card) 46'; Leistner (yellow card) 52'; Rangel (yellow card) 76'; Lynch (yellow card) 85'	Stadium: Elland Road; Attendance: 33,781; Referee: Peter Bankes

15 December 2018 22	Queens Park Rangers	2–1	Middlesbrough	Shepherd's Bush, London
15:00 GMT	Wszołek 4'; Wells 60'	Report	Saville 51', (yellow card) 58'; Flint (yellow card) 73'; Assombalonga (yellow card) 88'	Stadium: Loftus Road; Attendance: 14,088; Referee: Oliver Langford

22 December 2018 23	Nottingham Forest	0–1	Queens Park Rangers	West Bridgford
15:00 GMT	Carvalho (yellow card) 43'; Ansarifard (yellow card) 58'; Robinson (yellow card) 78'	Report	Leistner 45'; Luongo (yellow card) 65'	Stadium: The City Ground; Attendance: 28,177; Referee: Gavin Ward

26 December 2018 24	Queens Park Rangers	3–0	Ipswich Town	Shepherd's Bush, London
15:00 GMT	Wszołek 30' (yellow card) 43'; Lynch 34'; Wells 74'	Report	Chambers (yellow card) 4'; Spence (yellow card) 49'	Stadium: Loftus Road; Attendance: 14,584; Referee: Keith Stroud

29 December 2018 25	Queens Park Rangers	0–0	Reading	Shepherd's Bush, London
15:00 GMT	Cousins (yellow card) 48'; Scowen (yellow card) 52'; Furlong (yellow card) 70'	Report	Swift (yellow card) 62'; O'Shea (yellow card) 68'	Stadium: Loftus Road; Attendance: 15,721; Referee: Robert Jones

1 January 2019 26	Aston Villa	2–2	Queens Park Rangers	Aston
15:00 GMT	Abraham 21', 75'; Hourihane (yellow card) 45'; Kodjia (yellow card) 49'	Report	Wszołek (yellow card) 30'; Freeman 41'; Eze 57'; Leistner (yellow card) 69'; Osayi-Samuel (yellow card) 90'; Lumley (yellow card) 90+4'; Bidwell (yellow card) 90+10'	Stadium: Villa Park; Attendance: 37,760; Referee: James Linington

12 January 2019 27	Sheffield United	1–0	Queens Park Rangers	Sheffield
15:00 GMT	McGoldrick 37'; Fleck (yellow card) 56'; Dowell (yellow card) 78'	Report	Cousins (yellow card) 12'	Stadium: Bramall Lane; Attendance: 25,501; Referee: Andy Woolmer

19 January 2019 28	Queens Park Rangers	1–4	Preston North End	Shepherd's Bush, London
15:00 GMT	Scowen (yellow card) 9'; Smith 84'; Furlong (yellow card) 90+2'; Lynch (yellow card) 90+3'	Report	Stockley 14'; Maguire (yellow card) 23'; Storey 68'; Browne 82'; Potts 87'; Fisher (yellow card) 90+5'	Stadium: Loftus Road; Attendance: 13,736; Referee: Andy Madley

2 February 2019 29	Wigan Athletic	2–1	Queens Park Rangers	Wigan
15:00 GMT	Windass 8'; Evans (yellow card) 21'; Clarke 55'; Kipré (yellow card) 83'; Jacobs (yellow card) 90+1'	Report	Luongo (yellow card) 13'; Osayi-Samuel 75'	Stadium: DW Stadium; Attendance: 9,799; Referee: Scott Duncan

9 February 2019 30	Queens Park Rangers	3–4	Birmingham City	Shepherd's Bush, London
15:00 GMT	Smith 45+1', 48'; Lynch (yellow card) 53'; Cousins 80'; Wells (penalty missed) 90+3'	Report	Adams 21', 26', 42'; Dean 36'; Maghoma (yellow card) 58'	Stadium: Loftus Road; Attendance: 14,234; Referee: Darren Bond

12 February 2019 31	Bristol City	2–1	Queens Park Rangers	Bristol
19:45 GMT	Pack (yellow card) 62'; Pisano (yellow card) 69'; Eliasson 73'; Diédhiou 90+3' (pen.)	Report	Smith 45'; Hall (yellow card) 90+1'; Furlong (yellow card) 90+2'; Leistner (yellow card) 90+2'; Bidwell (yellow card) 90+7'; Lumley (yellow card) 90+8'; Wszołek (yellow card) 90+8'	Stadium: Ashton Gate Stadium; Attendance: 19,183; Referee: Tony Harrington

19 February 2019 32	Queens Park Rangers	2–3	West Bromwich Albion	Shepherd's Bush, London
19:45 GMT	Freeman 35'; Hemed 75' (pen.)	Report	Montero 5'; Murphy 61'; Livermore (yellow card) 77' (goal) 90+4'	Stadium: Loftus Road; Attendance: 12,257; Referee: John Brooks

23 February 2019 33	Middlesbrough	2–0	Queens Park Rangers	Middlesbrough
15:00 GMT	Howson 2' (yellow card) 63'; Bešić (yellow card) 14'; Fletcher 32'	Report	Cousins (yellow card) 70'	Stadium: Riverside Stadium; Attendance: 22,338; Referee: Andrew Madley

26 February 2019 34	Queens Park Rangers	1–0	Leeds United	Shepherd's Bush, London
19:45 GMT	Luongo (yellow card) 45+2'; Freeman 49'; Bidwell (yellow card) 50'; Wells (yellow card) 57'; Scowen (yellow card) 87'	Report	Brown (yellow card) 85'	Stadium: Loftus Road; Attendance: 14,763; Referee: Andy Davies

2 March 2019 35	Brentford	3–0	Queens Park Rangers	Brentford
15:00 GMT	Maupay 50'; Dalsgaard (yellow card) 67'; Benrahma 71'; Sawyers (yellow card) 77'; Canós 90+5'	Report	Hall (yellow card) 49'; Osayi-Samuel (yellow card) 64'	Stadium: Griffin Park; Attendance: 11,771; Referee: Keith Stroud

9 March 2019 36	Queens Park Rangers	0–0	Stoke City	Shepherd's Bush, London
15:00 GMT	Wszołek (yellow card) 45+1'; Hall (yellow card) 60' (yellow-red card) 87'	Report	Clucas (red card) 8'; Allen (yellow card) 31'; McClean (yellow card) 45+1'	Stadium: Loftus Road; Referee: Gavin Ward

13 March 2019 37	Queens Park Rangers	1–2	Rotherham United	Shepherd's Bush, London
19:45 GMT	Bidwell (yellow card) 43'; Osayi-Samuel 85'; Furlong (yellow card) 90+4'	Report	Mattock (yellow card) 17'; Ajayi 71', 90+5'	Stadium: Loftus Road; Attendance: 10,854; Referee: David Webb

16 March 2019 38	Hull City	2–2	Queens Park Rangers	Kingston upon Hull
15:00 GMT	Bowen 7', 44'; Ridgewell (yellow card) 28'; Stewart (yellow card) 90'	https://www.bbc.co.uk/sport/football/47505162 Report	Lynch (yellow card) 26'; Cameron (yellow card) 52'; Scowen 62'; Wszołek (yellow card) 72'; Hemed 84'	Stadium: KCOM Stadium; Attendance: 11,227; Referee: Steve Martin

30 March 2019 39	Queens Park Rangers	1–2	Bolton Wanderers	Shepherd's Bush, London
15:00 GMT	Wells 81'	Report	Buckley 35'; Connolly 71' (yellow card) 75'	Stadium: Loftus Road; Attendance: 13,603; Referee: Geoff Eltringham

6 April 2019 40	Norwich City	4–0	Queens Park Rangers	Norwich
12:30 BST	Buendía 6' (red card) 71'; Stiepermann 12'; Pukki 38', 85'	Report	Lynch (yellow card) 44'; Furlong (yellow card) 90+1'	Stadium: Carrow Road; Attendance: 29,796; Referee: Scott Duncan

10 April 2019 41	Millwall	0–0	Queens Park Rangers	Bermondsey
19:45 BST	Marshall (yellow card) 14'; Tunnicliffe (yellow card) 30'	Report	Lynch (yellow card) 24'; Manning (yellow card) 33'; Luongo (yellow card) 49'	Stadium: The Den; Referee: John Brooks

13 April 2019 42	Queens Park Rangers	4–0	Swansea City	Shepherd's Bush, London
15:00 BST	Furlong 3'; Hemed 5' 17'; Scowen (yellow card) 11'; Rangel (yellow card) 38'; Osayi-Samuel (yellow card) 44'; Cousins (yellow card) 45+4'; Luongo 54'	Report	Rodon (yellow card) 85'	Stadium: Loftus Road; Attendance: 13,872; Referee: Andy Madley

19 April 2019 43	Queens Park Rangers	1–2	Blackburn Rovers	Shepherd's Bush, London
15:00 BST	Luongo (yellow card) 59'; Osayi-Samuel (yellow card) 81'; Smith 90+2'; Wells (yellow card) 90+3'	Report	Graham 22' (pen.); Dack (yellow card) 31' (goal) 46'; Rodwell (yellow card) 83'; Leutwiler (yellow card) 90+7'	Stadium: Loftus Road; Attendance: 13,632; Referee: Tim Robinson

22 April 2019 44	Derby County	2–0	Queens Park Rangers	Derby
15:00 BST	Wilson 90+4' (pen.), 90+11'; Bennett (yellow card) 90+9'	Report	Wszołek (yellow card) 42'; Scowen (yellow card) 54'; Luongo (yellow card) 67'	Stadium: Pride Park Stadium; Attendance: 25,986; Referee: David Webb

27 April 2019 45	Queens Park Rangers	0–1	Nottingham Forest	Shepherd's Bush, London
15:00 BST	Manning (yellow card) 90+2'	Report	Yates (yellow card) 38'; Ansarifard 55'; Robinson (yellow card) 90'	Stadium: Loftus Road; Attendance: 15,212; Referee: Scott Duncan

5 May 2019 46	Sheffield Wednesday	1–2	Queens Park Rangers	Owlerton
12:30 BST	Forestieri (penalty missed) 57'; Hector 84' (pen.) (yellow card) 90+4'; Matias (yellow card) 90+3'	Report	Scowen 28' (yellow card) 74'; Eze (penalty missed) 80'; Cameron (yellow card) 88'; Smith 90+3'	Stadium: Hillsborough Stadium; Attendance: 26,111; Referee: Andy Davies

=== Emirates FA Cup ===
Win Draw Loss

In the FA Cup, QPR entered the competition in the third round and were drawn at home against Leeds United. The fourth round draw was made live on BBC by Robbie Keane and Carl Ikeme from Wolverhampton on 7 January 2019. The fifth round draw was broadcast on 28 January 2019 live on BBC, Alex Scott and Ian Wright conducted the draw.

6 January 2019 Third round	Queens Park Rangers	2–1	Leeds United (Championship)	Shepherd's Bush, London
14:00 GMT	Oteh 23' (pen.); Furlong (yellow card) 72'; Bidwell 75'; Kakay (yellow card) 90+3'	Report	Halme (yellow card) 20' (goal) 25'; Alioski (yellow card) 84'; Baker (yellow card) 88'	Stadium: Loftus Road Stadium; Attendance: 11,637; Referee: Geoff Eltringham

26 January 2019 Fourth round	Portsmouth (League One)	1–1	Queens Park Rangers	Portsmouth
15:00 GMT	Whatmough (yellow card) 27'; Brown 63' (yellow card) 77'; Curtis (yellow card) 77'	Report	Manning (yellow card) 45'; Wells 74'; Lynch (yellow card) 78'	Stadium: Fratton Park; Attendance: 19,378; Referee: Gavin Ward

5 February 2019 Fourth round replay	Queens Park Rangers	2–0	Portsmouth (League One)	Shepherd's Bush, London
19:45 GMT	Scowen (yellow card) 52'; Wells 70'; Smith 77'	Report	Burgess (yellow card) 76'	Stadium: Loftus Road Stadium; Attendance: 13,115; Referee: David Coote

15 February 2019 Fifth round	Queens Park Rangers	0–1	Watford (Premier League)	Shepherd's Bush, London
19:45 GMT	Luongo (yellow card) 73'	Report	Capoue 45+1'; Mariappa (yellow card) 76'; Doucouré (yellow card) 86'; Janmaat (yellow card) 90+1'	Stadium: Loftus Road Stadium; Attendance: 17,212; Referee: Michael Oliver

=== Carabao Cup ===
On 15 June 2018, QPR were drawn at home against Peterborough United in the first round. The second round draw was made from the Stadium of Light on 16 August. The third round draw was made on 30 August 2018 by David Seaman and Joleon Lescott.

Win Draw Loss

14 Aug 2018 First round	Queens Park Rangers	2–0	Peterborough United (League One)	Shepherd's Bush, London
19:45 BST	Freeman 3'; Wszołek 6'	Report		Stadium: Loftus Road; Attendance: 4,021; Referee: Gavin Ward

28 Aug 2018 Second round	Queens Park Rangers	3–1	Bristol Rovers (League One)	Shepherd's Bush, London
19:45 BST	Osayi-Samuel 4' (yellow card) 83'; Wszołek 18'; Smith 64'	Report	Craig (yellow card) 28'; Upson (yellow card) 33' (goal) 87'; Bennett (yellow card) 83'	Stadium: Loftus Road; Attendance: 5,007; Referee: Charles Breakspear

25 Sept 2018 Third round	Blackpool (League One)	2–0	Queens Park Rangers	Blackpool
19:45 BST	Gnanduillet 28'; Tilt (yellow card) 56'; Spearing 90'	Report	Scowen (yellow card) 20'; Kakay (yellow card) 22'; Chair (yellow card) 34'; Cousins (yellow card) 39' (yellow-red card) 70'	Stadium: Bloomfield Road; Attendance: 1,910; Referee: Tim Robinson

== Squad statistics ==
=== Statistics ===
As of 5 May 2019

No.	Pos	Nat	Player	Total		Sky Bet Championship		Carabao Cup		Emirates FA Cup	
No.	Pos	Nat	Player	Apps	Goals	Apps	Goals	Apps	Goals	Apps	Goals
Goalkeepers
1	GK	(England) ENG	Matt Ingram	7	0	4	0	2	0	1	0
13	GK	(England) ENG	Joe Lumley	46	0	42	0	1	0	3	0
Defenders
2	DF	(England) ENG	Darnell Furlong	29	1	23+2	1	0	0	4	0
3	DF	(England) ENG	Jake Bidwell	45	1	40	0	1	0	4	1
4	DF	(England) ENG	Grant Hall	17	0	7+5	0	2	0	3	0
5	DF	(United States) USA	Geoff Cameron	19	1	17+2	1	0	0	0	0
22	DF	(Spain) ESP	Àngel Rangel	20	2	20	2	0	0	0	0
24	DF	(Sierra Leone) SLE	Osman Kakay	7	0	3	0	3	0	1	0
28	DF	(United States) USA	Giles Phillips	0	0	0	0	0	0	0	0
33	DF	(Wales) WAL	Joel Lynch	37	3	35	3	0	0	2	0
37	DF	(Germany) GER	Toni Leistner	46	2	40+3	2	1	0	2	0
Midfielders
7	MF	(England) ENG	Luke Freeman	47	7	42	6	1	1	4	0
8	MF	(England) ENG	Jordan Cousins	32	1	22+5	1	3	0	2	0
10	MF	(England) ENG	Eberechi Eze	46	4	37+5	4	0+1	0	1+2	0
11	MF	(England) ENG	Josh Scowen	40	1	23+12	1	2	0	3	0
14	MF	(Republic of Ireland) IRL	Ryan Manning	12	0	7+2	0	0+1	0	1+1	0
20	MF	(Nigeria) NGR	Bright Osayi-Samuel	34	3	9+18	2	3	1	2+2	0
21	MF	(Australia) AUS	Massimo Luongo	43	3	41	3	0	0	2	0
23	MF	(Poland) POL	Paweł Wszołek	44	6	29+9	4	3	2	2+1	0
27	MF	(Republic of Ireland) IRL	Olamide Shodipo	4	0	1+3	0	0	0	0	0
44	MF	(England) ENG	Faysal Bettache	1	0	0	0	0+1	0	0	0
Forwards
16	FW	(Israel) ISR	Tomer Hemed	29	7	16+11	7	0	0	0+2	0
17	FW	(England) ENG	Matt Smith	42	7	7+28	5	2+1	1	2+2	1
32	FW	(Bermuda) BER	Nahki Wells	43	9	32+8	7	0	0	3	2
34	FW	(England) ENG	Lewis Walker	4	0	1+3	0	0	0	0	0
Out on Loan
6	MF	(England) ENG	Sean Goss	1	0	0	0	0+1	0	0	0
15	DF	(England) ENG	Alex Baptiste	7	0	3+1	0	3	0	0	0
18	FW	(England) ENG	Aramide Oteh	6	1	0+3	0	0+1	0	2	1
19	MF	(Morocco) MAR	Ilias Chair	8	0	0+4	0	2	0	0+2	0
25	MF	(England) ENG	David Wheeler	0	0	0	0	0	0	0	0
26	GK	(Switzerland) SUI	Seny Dieng	0	0	0	0	0	0	0	0
28	DF	(Finland) FIN	Niko Hämäläinen	2	0	0	0	2	0	0	0
30	MF	(Northern Ireland) NIR	Charlie Owens	1	0	0	0	0+1	0	0	0
38	FW	(Northern Ireland) NIR	Paul Smyth	5	0	1+2	0	0+2	0	0	0
Left During the Season
9	FW	(Northern Ireland) NIR	Conor Washington	6	0	1+3	0	2	0	0	0
40	FW	(Guinea) GUI	Idrissa Sylla	3	0	1+2	0	0	0	0	0

=== Goals ===
As of 5 May 2019

Rank	Player	Position	Championship	League Cup	FA Cup	Total
1	(Bermuda) Nahki Wells	FW	7	0	2	9
2	(England) Luke Freeman	MF	7	1	0	8
2	(England) Matt Smith	FW	6	1	1	8
4	(Israel) Tomer Hemed	FW	7	0	0	7
5	(Poland) Paweł Wszołek	MF	4	2	0	6
6	(England) Ebere Eze	MF	4	0	0	4
7	(Wales) Joel Lynch	DF	3	0	0	3
7	(Nigeria) Bright Osayi-Samuel	MF	2	1	0	3
7	(Australia) Massimo Luongo	MF	3	0	0	3
10	(Spain) Àngel Rangel	DF	2	0	0	2
10	(Germany) Toni Leistner	DF	2	0	0	2
10	(England) Josh Scowen	MF	2	0	0	2
13	(United States) Geoff Cameron	MF	1	0	0	1
13	(England) Aramide Oteh	FW	0	0	1	1
13	(England) Jake Bidwell	DF	0	0	1	1
13	(England) Jordan Cousins	MF	1	0	0	1
13	(England) Darnell Furlong	MF	1	0	0	1
Own goal			1	0	0	1
Total			53	5	5	63

=== Clean sheets ===
As of 5 May 2019

Rank	Player	Position	Championship	League Cup	FA Cup	Total
1	(England) Joe Lumley	GK	13	1	1	15
2	(England) Matt Ingram	GK	0	0	0	0
Total			13	1	1	15

=== Disciplinary record ===
As of 5 May 2019

No.	Pos.	Name	Championship		FA Cup		League Cup		Total	
No.	Pos.	Name	Booked	Sent off (straight red)	Booked	Sent off (straight red)	Booked	Sent off (straight red)	Booked	Sent off (straight red)
2	DF	Darnell Furlong	5	0	1	0	0	0	6	0
3	DF	Jake Bidwell	8	0	0	0	0	0	8	0
4	DF	Grant Hall	4	1	0	0	0	0	4	1
5	DF	Geoff Cameron	2	0	0	0	0	0	2	0
7	MF	Luke Freeman	3	0	0	0	0	0	3	0
8	MF	Jordan Cousins	5	0	0	0	2	1	7	1
10	MF	Eberechi Eze	2	0	0	0	0	0	2	0
11	MF	Josh Scowen	10	0	1	0	1	0	12	0
13	GK	Joe Lumley	2	0	0	0	0	0	2	0
14	MF	Ryan Manning	3	0	1	0	0	0	4	0
16	FW	Tomer Hemed	1	0	0	0	0	0	1	0
19	MF	Ilias Chair	0	0	0	0	1	0	1	0
20	MF	Bright Osayi-Samuel	4	0	0	0	1	0	5	0
21	MF	Massimo Luongo	10	0	1	0	0	0	11	0
22	DF	Àngel Rangel	4	0	0	0	0	0	4	0
23	MF	Paweł Wszołek	8	0	0	0	0	0	8	0
24	DF	Osman Kakay	0	0	1	0	1	0	2	0
32	FW	Nahki Wells	4	0	0	0	0	0	4	0
33	DF	Joel Lynch	11	0	1	0	0	0	12	0
37	DF	Toni Leistner	7	0	0	0	0	0	7	0
Total			93	1	6	0	6	1	105	2

== Awards ==
=== External awards ===
==== Managerial and boardroom ====
Name	Position	Award	Date	Nominated/Won	Source
Steve McClaren	Manager	Football League Championship Manager of the Month October	9 November 2018	Won	
