= Idrissa Sylla =

Guinean footballer

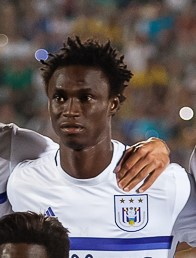
- Sylla with Anderlecht in 2016

Personal information
- Date of birth: 3 December 1990 (age 35)
- Place of birth: Conakry, Guinea
- Height: 1.87 m (6 ft 2 in)
- Position: Forward

Team information
- Current team: Saint-Pryvé Saint-Hilaire

Youth career
- 2008–2010: Le Mans

Senior career*
Years	Team	Apps	(Gls)
2010–2013	Le Mans	52	(14)
2010–2011	→ Bastia (loan)	27	(7)
2013–2015	Zulte Waregem	38	(9)
2015–2016	Anderlecht	27	(8)
2016–2018	Queens Park Rangers	61	(17)
2019–2020	Zulte Waregem	18	(3)
2019	→ Oostende (loan)	17	(2)
2020–2021	NorthEast United	18	(3)
2021–2022	Farense	4	(0)
2024–	Saint-Pryvé Saint-Hilaire	12	(3)

International career^{‡}
2012–	Guinea	27	(5)
- * Club domestic league appearances and goals as of 17 July 2024 ‡ National team caps and goals as of 23:13, 16 June 2019 (UTC)

Idrissa Sylla (born 3 December 1990) is a Guinean professional footballer who plays as a forward for French club Saint-Pryvé Saint-Hilaire and the Guinea national team. He is also referred to as Waddle due to him possessing a similar style of play to Chris Waddle.

== Club career ==
=== Le Mans ===
Sylla was the joint top scorer for Le Mans during the 2011–2012 Ligue 2 season, along with Idir Ouali, scoring 9 league goals.

=== Zulte Waregem ===
In August 2013, Sylla joined Belgian team Zulte Waregem on a two-year contract, following Le Mans' fall to the French lower divisions. He was transferred for an estimated fee of €150,000.

=== Anderlecht ===
On 2 February 2015, Sylla joined Anderlecht on a four-and-a-half-year contract.

=== Queens Park Rangers ===
On 30 August 2016, English club Queens Park Rangers announced the signing of Sylla from Anderlecht on a three-year contract for an undisclosed fee. Sylla made his QPR debut on 10 September 2016, coming off the bench in a 1–1 draw with Blackburn Rovers. He scored his first goal for the club in a 2–1 loss against Huddersfield Town on 17 September 2016. He then scored the winner against Fulham in a 2–1 victory.

Despite spending most of his first season at the club in and out of the starting 11, Sylla finished his first season at Loftus Road as the club's top scorer with 10 goals, many of which came from the bench.

=== Return to Zulte Waregem ===
On 5 January 2019, Sylla returned to Zulte Waregem for an undisclosed fee on a 2 1/2-year contract. On 7 August 2019, he joined Oostende on loan.

=== North East United ===
On 20 October 2020, Sylla joined Indian Super League club NorthEast United FC on a one-year deal.

=== Farense ===
On 11 September 2021, he signed a one-year deal with Farense in Portugal.

=== Saint-Pryvé Saint-Hilaire ===
In August 2023, Sylla joined French Championnat National 2 club Saint-Pryvé Saint-Hilaire.

== International career ==
Sylla made his debut for Guinea in a friendly against Ivory Coast on 29 February 2012.

He was a member of the Guinea squad at the 2015 Africa Cup of Nations.

== Career statistics ==
=== Club ===
As of match played 16 June 2019

Appearances and goals by club, season and competition
Club	Season	League			National cup		League cup		Continental		Other		Total	
Club	Season	Division	Apps	Goals	Apps	Goals	Apps	Goals	Apps	Goals	Apps	Goals	Apps	Goals
Le Mans	2010–11	Ligue 2	0	0	0	0	0	0	—		—		0	0
Le Mans	2011–12	Ligue 2	25	9	1	0	2	0	—		—		28	9
Le Mans	2012–13	Ligue 2	27	5	1	0	1	0	—		—		29	5
Le Mans	Total		52	14	2	0	3	0	—		—		57	14
Bastia (loan)	2010–11	Championnat National	27	7	0	0	2	0	—		—		29	7
Zulte Waregem	2013–14	Belgian Pro League	18	4	7	0	—		4	0	9	5	38	9
Zulte Waregem	2014–15	Belgian Pro League	20	5	2	2	—		4	2	0	0	26	9
Zulte Waregem	Total		38	9	9	2	—		8	2	9	5	64	18
Anderlecht	2015–16	Belgian Pro League	23	6	1	0	—		4	0	7	1	35	7
Anderlecht	2016–17	Belgian First Division A	4	2	0	0	—		4	1	0	0	8	3
Anderlecht	Total		27	8	1	0	—		8	1	7	1	43	10
Queens Park Rangers	2016–17	Championship	32	10	0	0	1	0	—		—		33	10
Queens Park Rangers	2017–18	Championship	26	7	0	0	2	0	—		—		28	7
Queens Park Rangers	2018–19	Championship	3	0	0	0	0	0	—		—		3	0
Queens Park Rangers	Total		61	17	0	0	3	0	—		—		64	17
Zulte Waregem	2018–19	Belgian First Division A	9	2	0	0	—		0	0	9	1	18	3
Career total			214	57	12	2	8	0	16	3	25	7	275	69

=== International ===
As of match played 6 January 2018

Appearances and goals by national team and year
National team	Year	Apps	Goals
Guinea	2012	6	0
Guinea	2013	0	0
Guinea	2014	7	2
Guinea	2015	6	2
Guinea	2016	5	1
Guinea	2017	1	0
Guinea	2019	2	0
Total		27	5

Scores and results list Guinea's goal tally first, score column indicates score after each Sylla goal.

List of international goals scored by Idrissa Sylla
No.	Date	Venue	Opponent	Score	Result	Competition
1	5 September 2014	Stade Mohamed V, Casablanca, Morocco	Togo	2–0	2–1	2015 Africa Cup of Nations qualification
2	15 November 2014	Stade de Kégué, Lomé, Togo	Togo	1–0	4–1	2015 Africa Cup of Nations qualification
3	6 September 2015	Rufaro Stadium, Harare, Zimbabwe	Zimbabwe	1–0	1–1	2015 Africa Cup of Nations qualification
4	15 November 2015	Stade du 28 Septembre, Conakry, Guinea	Namibia	1–0	2–0	2018 FIFA World Cup qualification
5	29 March 2016	Kamuzu Stadium, Blantyre, Malawi	Malawi	2–1	2–1	2017 Africa Cup of Nations qualification
