= 2015–16 Queens Park Rangers F.C. season =

English football club season

Queens Park Rangers
2015–16 season
- Co-owners: The Tune Group (66%); Lakshmi Mittal (33%)
- Co-chairmen: Tony Fernandes; Ruben Gnanalingam
- Manager: Chris Ramsey (until 4 November 2015); Neil Warnock (until 4 December 2015) (caretaker manager); Jimmy Floyd Hasselbaink (from 4 December 2015)
- Stadium: Loftus Road
- EFL Championship: 12th
- FA Cup: Third Round
- League Cup: Second Round
- Top goalscorer: League: Charlie Austin/Tjaronn Chery (10); All: Charlie Austin/Tjaronn Chery (10)
- Highest home attendance: 18,031 (vs Leeds United, 28 November 2015)
- Lowest home attendance: 14,007 (vs Blackburn Rovers, 16 September 2015)
- Average home league attendance: 15,994
- Biggest win: 3-0 Vs Yeovil (11 August 2015), MK Dons (24 October 2015), Rotherham United (6 January 2016), Brentford (12 March 2016)
- Biggest defeat: 0-4 Vs Fulham (25 September 2015), Brighton & Hove Albion (19 April 2016)
Home colours	Away colours	Third colours

The 2015–16 season was Queens Park Rangers' first season back in the Football League Championship following their relegation from the Premier League last season and their 134th year in existence. Along with the Championship, the club also competed in the FA Cup and the Football League Cup. The season covers the period from 1 July 2015 to 30 June 2016.

== Kit ==
Nike continued as manufacturers of QPR's kit. Airline AirAsia continued as kit sponsor.

Home	Home alt.	Away	Away alt.	Third

=== Kit information ===
Nike supplied the kit in the second year of a four-year deal.

== Club ==
=== Coaching staff ===
Updated 7 August 2015.

Position	Name	Nationality
Director of Football	Les Ferdinand	English
Head Coach	Jimmy Floyd Hasselbaink	Dutch
First Team Coach	Steve Gallen	Irish (Note: Gallen was born in Ealing, England, but also qualified to represent the Republic of Ireland internationally and represented them at U-18 and U-21 level.)
First Team Advisor	Neil Warnock	English
Goalkeeping Coach	Paul Crichton	English
Head of Fitness	Carl Serrant	English
Academy Manager	Perry Suckling	English
Head of Coaching and Coach Education	Simon Ireland	English
Scouting Coordinator	Ian Butterworth	English
Head Physio	Nigel Cox	English
Head of Medical Services	Peter Florida-James	English
Kit Man	Gary Doyle	English
Senior Professional Development Coach	Paul Hall	Jamaican (Note: Hall was born in Manchester, England, but also qualified to represent Jamaica internationally and made his international debut for Jamaica in 1997.)
Professional Development Coach	Paul Furlong	English
Assistant Professional Development Coach	Murray Jones	English
Academy Coach	Andy Impey	English
Head of Recruitment	David Magrone	Australian
Head of Academy Recruitment	Gary Karsa	English
Chief Scout	Steve Hitchen	English

=== Board of directors ===
Updated 15 June 2015.

Position	Name	Nationality
Owners	Tony Fernandes; Lakshmi Mittal	Malaysian; Indian
Co-Chairmen	Tony Fernandes	Malaysian
Co-Chairmen	Ruben Gnanalingam	Malaysian
Vice-Chairman	Amit Bhatia	Indian
Board Members	Tony Fernandes	Malaysian
Board Members	Amit Bhatia	Indian
Board Members	Kamarudin Meranun	Malaysian
CEO	Lee Hoos	American
COO	Mark Donnelly	English

== Players ==
=== First team squad ===
No.	Name	Nat	Position	Since	Date of birth (age)	Signed from	Games	Goals
Goalkeepers
1	Robert Green	(England)	GK	2012	18 January 1980 (age 46)	(England) West Ham United	121	0
13	Joe Lumley	(England)	GK	2013	15 February 1995 (age 31)	(England) Queens Park Rangers Academy	1	0
25	Alex Smithies	(England)	GK	2015	5 March 1990 (age 36)	(England) Huddersfield Town	14	0
29	Matt Ingram	(England)	GK	2016	18 December 1993 (age 32)	(England) Wycombe Wanderers	0	0
44	Marcin Brzozowski	(Poland)	GK	2011	29 October 1998 (age 28)	(England) Queens Park Rangers Academy	0	0
45	Conor Hudnott	(England)	GK	2013	2 September 1996 (age 30)	(England) Chelsea	0	0
Defenders
3	Armand Traoré	(Senegal) (Note: Traoré was born in Chatenay-Malabry, France, and represented them at U-17, U-18, U-19, and U-21 level, but also qualifies to represent Senegal internationally and made his international debut for Senegal in August 2011.)	LB	2011	8 October 1989 (age 37)	(England) Arsenal	89	2
4	Grant Hall	(England)	CB	2015	29 October 1991 (age 35)	(England) Tottenham Hotspur	31	0
5	Nedum Onuoha (C)	(England) (Note: Onuoha was born in Warri, Nigeria, but was raised in England and has represented them at U-20 and U-21 level.)	CB	2012	12 November 1986 (age 39)	(England) Manchester City	126	4
6	Clint Hill	(England)	CB	2010	19 October 1978 (age 48)	(England) Crystal Palace	165	5
15	Paul Konchesky	(England)	LB	2015	15 May 1981 (age 45)	on loan from (England) Leicester City	33	0
24	James Perch	(England)	RB	2015	28 September 1985 (age 41)	(England) Wigan Athletic	30	0
26	Gabriele Angella	(Italy)	CB	2015	28 April 1989 (age 37)	on loan from (England) Watford	15	1
40	Jack Robinson	(England)	LB	2014	1 September 1993 (age 33)	(England) Liverpool	0	0
42	Cole Kpekawa	(England)	LB	2014	20 April 1996 (age 30)	(England) Queens Park Rangers Academy	2	0
Midfielders
7	Matt Phillips	(Scotland) (Note: Phillips was born in Aylesbury, England, and represented them at U-19 and U-21 level, but also qualifies to represent Scotland internationally through his grandparents and made his international debut for Scotland in May 2012.)	RM	2013	25 October 1991 (age 35)	(England) Blackpool	83	13
8	Tjaronn Chery	(Netherlands)	AM	2015	4 September 1988 (age 38)	(Netherlands) Groningen	32	8
17	Oscar Gobern	(England)	CM	2015	26 January 1991 (age 35)	(England) Huddersfield Town	0	0
18	Alejandro Faurlín	(Argentina)	CM	2009	9 August 1986 (age 40)	(Argentina) Instituto Atlético	144	5
19	Abdenasser El Khayati	(Netherlands)	LM	2016	7 February 1989 (age 37)	(England) Burton Albion	8	0
20	Karl Henry	(England)	DM	2013	26 November 1982 (age 43)	(England) Wolverhampton Wanderers	92	1
21	Massimo Luongo	(Australia)	CM	2015	25 September 1992 (age 34)	(England) Swindon Town	25	0
23	Junior Hoilett	(Canada)	LM	2012	5 June 1990 (age 36)	(England) Blackburn Rovers	106	11
28	Dániel Tőzsér	(Hungary)	CM	2015	12 May 1985 (age 41)	(Italy) Parma	16	1
32	Samba Diakité	(Mali) (Note: Diakité was born in Montfermeil, France, but also qualifies to represent Mali internationally and made his international debut for Mali in January 2012.)	DM	2012	24 February 1989 (age 37)	(France) Nancy	23	1
34	Michael Petrasso	(Canada)	RM	2013	9 July 1995 (age 31)	(England) Queens Park Rangers Academy	6	0
Forwards
9	Conor Washington	(Northern Ireland) (Note: Washington was born in Chatham, England, but also qualifies to represent Scotland internationally through his mother and Northern Ireland through his grandmother and made his international debut for Northern Ireland in March 2016.)	FW	2016	18 May 1992 (age 34)	(England) Peterborough United	8	0
12	Jamie Mackie	(Scotland) (Note: Mackie was born in Dorking, England, but also qualifies to represent Scotland internationally through his grandfather and made his international debut for Scotland in October 2010.)	FW	2015	22 September 1985 (age 41)	(England) Nottingham Forest	98	18
33	Sebastian Polter	(Germany)	FW	2015	1 April 1991 (age 35)	(Germany) Mainz 05	23	6
36	Tyler Blackwood	(England)	FW	2015	24 July 1991 (age 35)	(United States) South Florida Bulls	1	0
39	Reece Grego-Cox	(Republic of Ireland) (Note: Grego-Cox was born in Hammersmith and Fulham, England, but also qualifies to represent the Republic of Ireland internationally through his grandparents and has represented them at U-17, U-19, and U-21 level.)	FW	2015	12 November 1996 (age 29)	(England) Queens Park Rangers Academy	4	0

== Trialists ==
=== Players ===
Pos	Player	Date reported	Most recent club	Signed?	Source
MF	(England) Oscar Gobern	9 July 2015	Huddersfield Town	Yes	
DF	(Germany) Chris Schorch	9 July 2015	MSV Duisburg	No	
MF	(England) Callum Chettle	11 July 2015	Ilkeston	No	
DF	(England) Grant Hall	2 August 2015	Tottenham Hotspur	Yes	
FW	(England) Leon Lobjoit	8 September 2015	Hemel Hempstead Town	Yes	

== New contracts ==
=== Signed contracts ===
==== Players ====
No.	Pos	Player	Contract length	Contract end	Date	Source
38	DF	(England) Darnell Furlong	2 years	2017	15 May 2015	
—	DF	(England) Addison Garnett	1 year	2016	15 May 2015	
—	DF	(Australia) James Haran	1 year	2016	15 May 2015	
—	GK	(England) Martin Herdman	1 year	2016	15 May 2015	
45	GK	(England) Conor Hudnott	1 year	2016	15 May 2015	
—	FW	(Cyprus) Andreas Komodikis	1 year	2016	15 May 2015	
13	GK	(England) Joe Lumley	2 years	2017	15 May 2015	
—	MF	(England) Aaron Mitchell	1 year	2016	15 May 2015	
—	MF	(Republic of Ireland) Jake Mulraney	1 year	2016	15 May 2015	
—	MF	(England) Callum O'Sullivan	1 year	2016	15 May 2015	
—	DF	(England) Harly Wise	1 year	2016	15 May 2015	
41	MF	(Montserrat) Brandon Comley (Note: Comley was born in Islington, England, but also qualifies to represent Montserrat internationally and has been called up by the Montserrat national football team.)	2 years	2017	27 May 2015	
—	FW	(England) Ben Pattie	6 months	2015	19 June 2015	
37	MF	(Republic of Ireland) Frankie Sutherland (Note: Sutherland was born in Hillingdon, England, but also qualifies to represent the Republic of Ireland internationally through his grandmother and represented them at U-17, U-19, and U-21 level.)	1 year	2016	19 June 2015	
18	MF	(Argentina) Alejandro Faurlín	1 year	2016	23 June 2015	
—	DF	(Republic of Ireland) Michael Harriman (Note: Harriman was born in Chichester, England, but also qualifies to represent the Republic of Ireland internationally and represented them at U-18, U-19, and U-21 level.)	1 year	2016	1 July 2015	
6	DF	(England) Clint Hill	1 year	2016	3 July 2015	
20	MF	(England) Karl Henry	1 year	2016	6 July 2015	
5	DF	(England) Nedum Onuoha	2 years	2018	2 September 2015	
16	MF	(Wales) Michael Doughty (Note: Doughty was born in Westminster, England, but also qualifies to represent Wales internationally and has represented them at U-19 and U-21 level.)	2 years	2018	8 October 2015	
4	DF	(England) Grant Hall	4 years	2019	6 January 2016	
—	DF	(England) Osman Kakay	1 year	2017	29 January 2016	

==== Managerial and boardroom ====
Pos	Name	Contract length	Contract end	Date	Source
Head Coach	(England) Chris Ramsey	3 years	2018	15 May 2015	

== Transfers ==
=== Transfers in ===
==== Players ====
Date from	Position	Nationality	Name	From	Fee	Ref.
1 July 2015	CB	ENG	George Butler	Academy	Trainee	
1 July 2015	CM	IRL	Nathan Corkery	Academy	Trainee	
1 July 2015	FW	ENG	Jay Emmanuel-Thomas	Bristol City	Free transfer	
1 July 2015	CM	ENG	Ben Gladwin	Swindon Town	Undisclosed	
1 July 2015	RB	ENG	Osman Kakay	Academy	Trainee	
1 July 2015	DM	AUS	Massimo Luongo	Swindon Town	Undisclosed	
1 July 2015	RW	SCO	Jamie Mackie	Nottingham Forest	Free transfer	
1 July 2015	RM	ENG	Joseph N'Guessan	Stevenage	Free transfer	
1 July 2015	MF	FRA	Axel Prohouly	Monaco	Free transfer	
1 July 2015	FW	IRL	Olamide Shodipo	Academy	Trainee	
2 July 2015	FW	GER	Sebastian Polter	FSV Mainz	£1,000,000	
20 July 2015	AM	NED	Tjaronn Chery	FC Groningen	£2,250,000	
31 July 2015	CB	ENG	James Perch	Wigan Athletic	Undisclosed	
1 August 2015	FW	ENG	Tyler Blackwood	South Florida Bulls	Free transfer	
6 August 2015	CM	ENG	Oscar Gobern	Huddersfield Town	Free transfer	
7 August 2015	CB	ENG	Grant Hall	Tottenham Hotspur	Undisclosed	
20 August 2015	GK	ENG	Alex Smithies	Huddersfield Town	Undisclosed	
21 August 2015	AM	BEL (Note: Rosenthal was born in London, England, but also qualifies to represent Israel internationally through his father and Belgium, and represented Belgium at U-18 and U-19 level and Israel at U-21 level.)	Tom Rosenthal	Zulte Waregem	Undisclosed	
28 August 2015	DM	HUN	Dániel Tőzsér	Parma	Free transfer	
1 December 2015	CM	AUS	Joshua Wallen	Palm Beach	Free transfer	
19 January 2016	CF	ENG	Conor Washington	Peterborough United	Undisclosed	
22 January 2016	GK	ENG	Matt Ingram	Wycombe Wanderers	Undisclosed	
1 February 2016	LW	NED	Abdenasser El Khayati	Burton Albion	£350,000	

==== Managerial and boardroom ====
Date from	Position	Nationality	Name	From	Ref.
13 May 2015	Academy Manager	ENG	Perry Suckling	Tottenham Hotspur (Goalkeeping Coach)	
20 May 2015	CEO	USA	Lee Hoos	Burnley	
15 June 2015	Co-Chairman	MYS	Ruben Gnanalingam	—	
15 June 2015	Club Ambassador	ENG	Andy Sinton	A.F.C. Telford United (Head Coach)	
7 August 2015	Goalkeeping Coach	ENG	Paul Crichton	Blackpool	
16 October 2015	Academy Coach	ENG	Andy Impey	Coventry City (Player)	
16 October 2015	Head of Academy Recruitment	ENG	Gary Karsa	Aston Villa (Head of Football Operations)	
16 October 2015	Assistant Professional Development Coach	ENG	Murray Jones	Brighton & Hove Albion (Academy Coach)	
18 October 2015	First Team Advisor	ENG	Neil Warnock	Crystal Palace (Head Coach)	

=== Loans in ===
Date from	Position	Nationality	Name	From	Until	Ref.
4 August 2015	LB	ENG	Paul Konchesky	Leicester City	30 June 2016	
1 September 2015	CB	ITA	Gabriele Angella	Watford	30 June 2016	

=== Transfers out ===
==== Players ====
Date from	Position	Nationality	Name	To	Fee	Ref.
1 July 2015	LW	POR	Bruno Andrade	Woking (Note: Following Andrade's release he joined Woking.)	Free transfer	
1 July 2015	DM	ENG	Joey Barton	Burnley (Note: Following Barton's release he joined Burnley.)	Free transfer	
1 July 2015	CB	IRL	Richard Dunne	Retired (Note: Following Dunne's release he retired.)	—N/a	
1 July 2015	CB	ENG	Rio Ferdinand	Retired (Note: Following Ferdinand's release he retired.)	—N/a	
1 July 2015	RW	ENG	Jordan Gibbons	Yeovil Town (Note: Following Gibbons' release he joined Yeovil Town.)	Free transfer	
1 July 2015	GK	AUS	Aaron Lennox	Hayes & Yeading United (Note: Following Lennox's release he joined Hayes & Yeading United.)	Free transfer	
1 July 2015	ST	ENG	Tyrell Mitford	Butler Bulldogs (Note: Following Mitford's release he joined Butler Bulldogs.)	Free transfer	
1 July 2015	GK	IRL	Brian Murphy	Portsmouth (Note: Following Murphy's release he joined Portsmouth.)	Free transfer	
1 July 2015	CB	NIR	Jamie Sendles-White	Hamilton Academical (Note: Following Sendles-White's release he joined Hamilton Academical.)	Free transfer	
1 July 2015	AM	MAR	Adel Taarabt	Benfica	Free transfer	
1 July 2015	ST	ENG	Trey Williams	New York Cosmos B (Note: Following Williams' release he joined New York Cosmos B.)	Free transfer	
1 July 2015	RW	ENG	Shaun Wright-Phillips	New York Red Bulls (Note: Following Wright-Phillips' release he joined New York Red Bulls.)	Free transfer	
1 July 2015	CF	ENG	Bobby Zamora	Brighton & Hove Albion (Note: Following Zamora's release he joined Brighton & Hove Albion.)	Free transfer	
2 July 2015	CB	GER	Max Ehmer	Gillingham	Free transfer	
10 July 2015	CB	SCO	Coll Donaldson	Dundee United (Note: Following Donaldson's release he joined Dundee United.)	Free transfer	
23 July 2015	GK	ENG	Alex McCarthy	Crystal Palace	£3,500,000	
6 January 2016	RB	IRL	Michael Harriman	Wycombe Wanderers	Undisclosed	
16 January 2016	CF	ENG	Charlie Austin	Southampton	Undisclosed	
31 March 2016	CF	ENG	Tyler Blackwood	Arizona United	Undisclosed	
4 May 2016	CB	ENG	Tom Matthews	The New Saints	Undisclosed	

==== Managerial and boardroom ====
Date from	Position	Nationality	Name	To	Ref.
10 June 2015	Sports Psychologist	ENG	Steve Black	—	
29 June 2015	Goalkeeping Coach	ENG	Kevin Hitchcock	—	
1 July 2015	First Team Coach	ENG	Kevin Bond	—	

=== Loans out ===
==== Players ====
Date from	Position	Nationality	Name	To	Date until	Ref.
10 July 2015	RB	IRL	Michael Harriman	Wycombe Wanderers	31 January 2016	
29 July 2015	CB	ENG	Steven Caulker	Southampton	12 January 2016 (Note: On 12 January 2016, Caulker's loan at Southampton was cut short from 30 June 2016 to 12 January 2016.)	
6 August 2015	DM	FIN	Niko Hämäläinen	Dagenham & Redbridge	10 October 2015 (Note: On 8 September 2015, Hämäläinen's loan at Dagenham & Redbridge was extended from 5 September 2015 to 10 October 2015.)	
14 August 2015	CF	ENG	Ben Pattie	Woking	2 November 2015 (Note: On 21 September 2015, Pattie's loan at Woking was extended from 12 September 2015 to 12 October 2015.) (Note: On 16 October 2015, Pattie's loan at Woking was extended from 12 October 2015 to 14 November 2015.) (Note: On 2 November 2015, Pattie's loan at Woking was cut short from 14 November 2015 to 2 November 2015.)	
1 September 2015	CM	ENG	Oscar Gobern	Doncaster Rovers	2 November 2015 (Note: On 2 November 2015, Gobern's loan at Doncaster Rovers was cut short from 4 January 2016 to 2 November 2015.)	
11 September 2015	RB	ENG	Darnell Furlong	Northampton Town	14 November 2015 (Note: On 9 October 2015, Furlong's loan at Northampton Town was extended from 11 October 2015 to 14 November 2015.)	
24 September 2015	ST	ENG	Tyler Blackwood	Newport County	24 October 2015	
7 October 2015	GK	ENG	Joe Lumley	Stevenage	4 November 2015	
7 October 2015	AM	IRL	Jake Mulraney	Dagenham & Redbridge	5 December 2015 (Note: On 5 November 2015, Mulraney's loan at Dagenham & Redbridge was extended from 2 November 2015 to 5 December 2015.)	
9 October 2015	LW	ENG	Ben Gladwin	Swindon Town	7 January 2016 (Note: On 5 November 2015, Gladwin's loan at Swindon Town was extended from 5 November 2015 to 3 December 2015.) (Note: On 3 December 2015, Gladwin's loan at Swindon Town was extended from 3 December 2015 to 9 January 2016.) (Note: On 7 January 2016, Gladwin's loan at Swindon Town was cut short from 9 January 2016 to 7 January 2016.)	
9 October 2015	CM	IRL	Frankie Sutherland	Dagenham & Redbridge	6 November 2015	
1 February 2016	LB	ENG	Cole Kpekawa	Leyton Orient	16 January 2016 (Note: On 17 December 2015, Kpekawa's loan at Leyton Orient was extended from 19 December 2015 to 16 January 2016.) (Note: On 21 January 2016, Kpekawa's loan at Leyton Orient was extended from 16 January 2016 to 1 March 2016.) (Note: On 1 February 2016, Kpekawa's loan at Leyton Orient was cut short from 1 March 2016 to 1 February 2016.)	
20 November 2015	CF	ENG	Ben Pattie	Hendon	31 May 2016 (Note: On 1 February 2016, Pattie's loan at Hendon was extended from 19 December 2015 to 31 May 2016.)	
5 January 2016	RB	ENG	Darnell Furlong	Cambridge United	6 February 2016	
12 January 2016	CB	ENG	Steven Caulker	Liverpool	30 June 2016	
15 January 2016	CM	WAL	Michael Doughty	Swindon Town	30 June 2016 (Note: On 30 January 2016, Doughty's loan at Swindon Town was extended from 13 February 2016 to 30 June 2016.)	
19 January 2016	RW	ENG	Ben Gladwin	Bristol City	22 April 2016	
21 January 2016	DM	MSR	Brandon Comley	Carlisle United	20 March 2016 (Note: On 18 February 2016, Comley's loan at Carlisle United was extended from 20 February 2016 to 20 March 2016.)	
29 January 2016	DM	BRA	Sandro	West Bromwich Albion	30 June 2016	
29 January 2016	RB	ENG	Osman Kakay	Livingston	30 June 2016	
1 February 2016	FW	ENG	Jay Emmanuel-Thomas	Milton Keynes Dons	30 June 2016	
1 February 2016	CM	NED	Leroy Fer	Swansea City	30 June 2016	
15 February 2016	LB	KOR	Yun Suk-young	Charlton Athletic	30 June 2016	
28 February 2016	CB	AUS	James Haran	Havant & Waterlooville	30 June 2016	
28 February 2016	CM	ENG	Aaron Mitchell	Havant & Waterlooville	30 June 2016	

=== Overall transfer activity ===
==== Spending ====
Summer: ▼£6,750,000

Winter: ▼£3,520,000

Total: ▼£10,270,000

==== Income ====
Summer: ▲£3,500,000

Winter: ▲£4,000,000

Total: ▲£7,500,000

==== Expenditure ====
Summer: ▼£3,250,000

Winter: ▲£480,000

Total: ▼£2,770,000

== Managerial and boardroom position changes ==
Old position	New position	Name	Date	Source
Chairman, Co-owner and Board Member	Co-chairman, Co-owner and Board Member	(Malaysia) Tony Fernandes	15 June 2015	
Senior Professional Development Coach	First Team Coach	(Republic of Ireland) Steve Gallen	29 June 2015	
Assistant Professional Development Coach	Senior Professional Development Coach	(Jamaica) Paul Hall	29 June 2015	
Academy Manager	Academy Manager and Caretaker Goalkeeping Coach	(England) Perry Suckling	29 June 2015	
Academy Manager and Caretaker Goalkeeping Coach	Academy Manager	(England) Perry Suckling	7 August 2015	

== Friendlies ==
=== Pre-season friendlies ===
On 29 May 2015, Queens Park Rangers announced their pre-season fixtures.

Win Draw Loss

11 July 2015 Friendly	Queens Park Rangers	10–0	(Italy) Verona Stars	Arona, Italy
17:00 CEST (UTC+2)	Diakité 7', 8'; Polter 44'; Hill 54'; Faurlín 71'; Grego-Cox 74'; Gladwin 78', 88'; Emmanuel-Thomas 80'; Hoilett 81'	Report		Stadium: Stadio Comunale di Dormelletto
Note: Game change due to Shaktar Donetsk withdrawing.

14 July 2015 Friendly	Queens Park Rangers	0–1	(France) Monaco	Châtillon, Italy
17:00 CEST (UTC+2)		Report	Cavaleiro 17'	Stadium: Stadio E. Brunod Châtillon
Note: Venue change due to mutual pitch concerns.

17 July 2015 Friendly	Queens Park Rangers home	1–4	Queens Park Rangers away	Arona, Italy
15:45 CEST (UTC+2)	Faurlín 34'	Report	Diakité 35'; Kakay 52'; Mitchell 86', 88'	Stadium: Stadio Comunale di Dormelletto
Note: Game change due to Ittihad withdrawing.

22 July 2015 Friendly	Queens Park Rangers	2–1	(Scotland) Dundee United	Canons Park, London
19:30 GMT (UTC+1)	Phillips 19'; Luongo 64'	Report	Bilate 31'	Stadium: The Hive Stadium; Attendance: 3,000

26 July 2015 Friendly	Newport County	0–0	Queens Park Rangers	Newport, Wales
14:00 BST		Report		Stadium: Rodney Parade

30 July 2015 Friendly	Queens Park Rangers	v	Swindon Town

2 August 2015 Friendly	Queens Park Rangers	1–1	(Italy) Atalanta	Shepherd's Bush, London
12:45 BST	Emmanuel-Thomas 63'	Report	Kurtić 14'	Stadium: Loftus Road
Note: Game change due to Chievo Verona withdrawing.

=== Friendlies during season ===
8 September 2015 Friendly	Reading	0–1	Queens Park Rangers	Finchampstead
Afternoon		Report	42' Emmanuel-Thomas	Stadium: Horwood Park Training Ground

15 September 2015 Friendly	Dagenham & Redbridge	2–1	Queens Park Rangers	Dagenham, London
Afternoon	10', 26'	Report	24' Grego-Cox	Stadium: Victoria Road

15-Aug-15	Queens Park Rangers v AFC Bournemouth	Private
30-Dec-15	Reading v Queens Park Rangers	Private
28-Jan-16	Queens Park Rangers v Reading	Private

== Competitions ==
=== Sky Bet Championship ===
==== League table ====
Pos	Team	Pld	W	D	L	GF	GA	GD	Pts
10	Birmingham City	46	16	15	15	53	49	+4	63
11	Preston North End	46	15	17	14	45	45	0	62
12	Queens Park Rangers	46	14	18	14	54	54	0	60
13	Leeds United	46	14	17	15	50	58	−8	59
14	Wolverhampton Wanderers	46	14	16	16	53	58	−5	58

Source: BBC Sport
Rules for classification: 1) Points; 2) Goal difference; 3) Number of goals scored

==== Results summary ====
{Overall Home Away P W D L GF GA Pts W D L GF GA W D L GF GA 46 14 18 14 54 54 60 10 9 4 37 25 4 9 10 17 29

==== Results by matchday ====
Matchday	1	2	3	4	5	6	7	8	9	10	11	12	13	14	15	16	17	18	19	20	21	22	23	24	25	26	27	28	29	30	31	32	33	34	35	36	37	38	39	40	41	42	43	44	45	46
Ground	A	H	A	H	A	H	H	A	A	H	A	H	H	A	A	H	A	H	A	H	H	A	A	H	H	A	A	H	A	H	H	A	A	H	A	H	H	A	H	A	H	A	A	H	A	H
Result	L	D	W	W	W	L	D	D	L	W	L	D	W	L	L	D	L	W	W	D	D	D	L	D	L	D	W	D	D	W	L	D	D	W	L	W	W	D	L	D	W	D	L	D	L	W
Position	21	19	13	6	4	7	8	9	10	11	12	10	10	11	13	13	13	12	11	13	12	11	12	13	15	17	15	14	13	13	14	12	13	11	12	11	11	11	11	11	11	11	12	13	13	12

Updated to match(es) played on 27 January 2016. Source:
A = Away; H = Home; W = Win; D = Draw; L = Loss

==== Matches ====
On 17 June 2015, the fixtures for the forthcoming season were announced.

8 August 2015 1	Charlton Athletic	2–0	Queens Park Rangers	Charlton
15:00 BST	Watt 52' (yellow card) 90'; Fox 72'; Diarra (yellow card) 57'; Ba (yellow card) 60'	BBC Report; QPR Report	Hill (yellow card) 84'; Konchesky (yellow card) 89'	Stadium: The Valley; Attendance: 19,469; Referee: Robert Madley

15 August 2015 2	Queens Park Rangers	2–2	Cardiff City	Shepherd's Bush
17:15 BST	Hill 33'; Austin 56'	BBC Report; QPR Report	Morrison 63'; Malone 90'	Stadium: Loftus Road; Attendance: 14,927; Referee: Simon Hooper

19 August 2015 3	Wolverhampton Wanderers	2–3	Queens Park Rangers	Wolverhampton
19:45 BST	Afobe 17'; McDonald 24'; Hause (yellow card) 45+1'; Le Fondre (yellow card) 75'; Coady (yellow card) 90+5'	BBC Report; QPR Report	Austin 38'; Phillips 52', 72'; Onuoha (yellow card) 61'; Henry (yellow card) 65'	Stadium: Molineux; Attendance: 21,032; Referee: Peter Bankes

22 August 2015 4	Queens Park Rangers	4–2	Rotherham United	Shepherd's Bush
15:00 BST	Chery 42', 50'; Austin (yellow card) 62' (goal) 63', 90' (pen.)	BBC Report; QPR Report	Buxton (yellow card) 69'; Clarke-Harris 72'; Maguire (yellow card) 79'; Thorpe 88'	Stadium: Loftus Road; Attendance: 15,009; Referee: Dean Whitestone

29 August 2015 5	Huddersfield Town	0–1	Queens Park Rangers	Huddersfield
15:00 BST	Hogg (yellow card) 63'	BBC Report; QPR Report	Konchesky (yellow card) 61'; Chery 84'; Perch (yellow card) 90+1'; Phillips (yellow card) 90+3'	Stadium: John Smith's Stadium; Attendance: 11,189; Referee: Kevin Wright

12 September 2015 6	Queens Park Rangers	1–2	Nottingham Forest	Shepherd's Bush
12:30 BST	Perch (yellow card) 21'; Austin 65'; Green (red card) 72'	BBC Report; QPR Report	Lansbury 75' (pen.) (yellow card) 88'; Oliveira 82'; O'Grady (yellow card) 90+5'	Stadium: Loftus Road; Attendance: 15,424; Referee: Keith Hill

16 September 2015 7	Queens Park Rangers	2–2	Blackburn Rovers	Shepherd's Bush
19:45 BST	Smithies (yellow card) 14'; Austin (yellow card) 28' (goal) 46'; Onuoha 79'	BBC Report; QPR Report	Duffy 14'; Henley (yellow card) 41'; Guthrie (yellow card) 52'; Rhodes 60'	Stadium: Loftus Road; Attendance: 14,007; Referee: Darren Deadman

19 September 2015 8	Hull City	1–1	Queens Park Rangers	Hull
15:00 BST	Dawson 38'	BBC Report; QPR Report	Austin 26'	Stadium: KC Stadium; Attendance: 16,651; Referee: Oliver Langford

25 September 2015 9	Fulham	4–0	Queens Park Rangers	Fulham
19:45 BST	Dembélé 2'; Pringle 19'; McCormack 31', 63'	BBC Report; QPR Report	Perch (yellow card) 80'	Stadium: Craven Cottage; Attendance: 19,784; Referee: Kevin Friend

3 October 2015 10	Queens Park Rangers	4–3	Bolton Wanderers	Shepherd's Bush
15:00 BST	Emmanuel-Thomas 13', 90+4'; Fer 44'; Chery (yellow card) 45' (goal) 62'; Tőzsér (yellow card) 56'; Henry (yellow card) 75'	BBC Report; QPR Report	Madine 8'; Feeney 11'; Wellington Silva 85'	Stadium: Loftus Road; Attendance: 16,026; Referee: Darren Drysdale

17 October 2015 11	Birmingham City	2–1	Queens Park Rangers	Birmingham
15:00 BST	Robinson 24'; Caddis 63' (pen.) (yellow card) 67'	BBC Report; QPR Report	Phillips 17'; Perch (yellow card) 22'; Onuoha (yellow card) 63'	Stadium: St Andrew's; Attendance: 19,161; Referee: Carl Boyeson

20 October 2015 12	Queens Park Rangers	0–0	Sheffield Wednesday	Shepherd's Bush
19:45 BST	Sandro (yellow card) 9'	BBC Report; QPR Report		Stadium: Loftus Road; Attendance: 15,471; Referee: Andy Haines

24 October 2015 13	Queens Park Rangers	3–0	MK Dons	Shepherd's Bush
15:00 BST	Henry (yellow card) 59'; Emmanuel-Thomas 70'; Phillips 78'; Hoilett 88'	BBC Report; QPR Report	McFadzean (yellow card) 66'	Stadium: Loftus Road; Attendance: 15,567; Referee: Scott Duncan

30 October 2015 14	Brentford	1–0	Queens Park Rangers	Brentford
19:45 GMT	McCormack (yellow card) 21'; Djuricin 56' (yellow card) 87'	BBC Report; QPR Report	Hill (yellow card) 21'; Tőzsér (yellow card) 25'; Phillips (yellow card) 81'	Stadium: Griffin Park; Attendance: 12,037; Referee: Simon Hooper

3 November 2015 15	Derby County	1–0	Queens Park Rangers	Derby
19:45 GMT	Christie (yellow card) 42'; Weimann 51' (yellow card) 85'; Johnson (yellow card) 58'; Russell (yellow card) 90+5'	BBC Report; QPR Report	Yun (yellow card) 42'; Austin (yellow card) 48'; Perch (red card); Fer (yellow card) 90+3'	Stadium: iPro Stadium; Attendance: 28,502; Referee: Keith Stroud

7 November 2015 16	Queens Park Rangers	0–0	Preston North End	Shepherd's Bush
15:00 GMT	Onuoha (yellow card) 70'; Austin (yellow card) 79'	BBC Report; QPR Report		Stadium: Loftus Road; Attendance: 15,190; Referee: Robert Lewis

20 November 2015 17	Middlesbrough	1–0	Queens Park Rangers	Middlesbrough
19:45 GMT	Leadbitter (yellow card) 39' (goal) 90+3' (pen.)	BBC Report; QPR Report	Faurlín (yellow card) 48'; Phillips (yellow card) 70'; Onuoha (yellow card) 73'; Fer (red card) 90+2'	Stadium: Riverside Stadium; Attendance: 20,299; Referee: Chris Kavanagh

28 November 2015 18	Queens Park Rangers	1–0	Leeds United	Shepherd's Bush
15:00 GMT	Austin 58'	BBC Report; QPR Report	Bridcutt (yellow card) 7'; Wootton (yellow card) 36'; Cook (yellow card) 83'	Stadium: Loftus Road; Attendance: 18,031; Referee: Peter Bankes

3 December 2015 19	Reading	0−1	Queens Park Rangers	Reading
20:00 GMT	Norwood (yellow card) 68'	BBC Report; QPR Report	Fer (yellow card) 29'; Hall (yellow card) 41'; Onuoha 90'	Stadium: Madejski Stadium; Attendance: 16,365; Referee: Andrew Madley

12 December 2015 20	Queens Park Rangers	0−0	Burnley	Shepherd's Bush
15:00 GMT		BBC Report; QPR Report		Stadium: Loftus Road; Attendance: 16,576; Referee: Stuart Attwell

15 December 2015 21	Queens Park Rangers	2−2	Brighton & Hove Albion	Shepherd's Bush
19:45 GMT	Angella (yellow card) 38'; Onuoha (yellow card) 53'; Austin 64', 87'; Faurlin (yellow card) 87'	BBC Report; QPR Report	Stephens 52' van La Parra 54'; Dunk (red card)	Stadium: Loftus Road; Attendance: 15,268; Referee: Paul Tierney

19 December 2015 22	Bristol City	1−1	Queens Park Rangers	Bristol
15:00 GMT	Wilbraham 80'	BBC Report; QPR Report	Hoilett 56'	Stadium: Ashton Gate Stadium; Attendance: 15,754; Referee: Mark Haywood

26 December 2015 23	Ipswich Town	2−1	Queens Park Rangers	Ipswich
15:00 GMT	Douglas 77'; Oar (yellow card) 88'; Chambers 90+2'	BBC Report; QPR Report	Hoilett 45+3'; Konchesky (yellow card) 66'; Onuoha (yellow card) 90'	Stadium: Portman Road; Attendance: 23,615; Referee: Darren Drysdale

28 December 2015 24	Queens Park Rangers	1−1	Huddersfield Town	Shepherd's Bush
15:00 GMT	Polter 80'	BBC Report; QPR Report	Hudson (yellow card) 77'; Wells 86'; Huws (yellow card) 90'	Stadium: Loftus Road; Attendance: 16,662; Referee: Brendan Malone

1 January 2016 25	Queens Park Rangers	1−2	Hull City	Shepherd's Bush
17:15 GMT	Hoilett (yellow card) 74'; Polter 86'; Angella (yellow card) 90+1'	BBC Report; QPR Report	Maguire (yellow card) 35'; Hernández 61'; Diomande 90'	Stadium: Loftus Road; Attendance: 16,205; Referee: Keith Stroud

12 January 2016 26	Blackburn Rovers	1−1	Queens Park Rangers	Blackburn
19:45 GMT	Akpan 85'	BBC Report; QPR Report	Fer 24'	Stadium: Ewood Park; Attendance: 12,285; Referee: Eddie Ilderton

16 January 2016 27	Rotherham United	0−3	Queens Park Rangers	Rotherham
15:00 GMT	Facey (yellow card) 76'	BBC Report; QPR Report	Hoilett 51'; Phillips 53'; Polter 90'	Stadium: AESSEAL New York Stadium; Attendance: 9,594; Referee: James Adcock

23 January 2016 28	Queens Park Rangers	1–1	Wolverhampton Wanderers	Shepherd's Bush
12:30 GMT	Polter 2'	Report	Henry 48'	Stadium: Loftus Road; Attendance: 15,266; Referee: Andy Woolmer

26 January 2016 29	Nottingham Forest	0–0	Queens Park Rangers	Nottingham
19:45 GMT	Mendes (yellow card) 34'	Report	Perch (yellow card) 71'; Luongo (yellow card) 85'	Stadium: City Ground; Attendance: 17,030; Referee: Paul Tierney

6 February 2016 30	Queens Park Rangers	1–0	Ipswich Town	Shepherd's Bush
15:00 GMT	Faurlin (yellow card) 34'; Onuoha (yellow card) 60'; Phillips 88'	Report	Bru (yellow card) 8'	Stadium: Loftus Road; Attendance: 17,044; Referee: Charles Breakspear

13 February 2016 31	Queens Park Rangers	1–3	Fulham	Shepherd's Bush
12:30 GMT	Onuoha (yellow card) 48'; Hall (yellow card) 82'; Chery 90+1'	Report	McCormack 35'; Dembélé 40'; Cairney 45+2'; Burn (yellow card) 67'; O'Hara (yellow card) 68'	Stadium: Loftus Road; Attendance: 17,335; Referee: Tim Robinson

20 February 2016 32	Bolton Wanderers	1–1	Queens Park Rangers	Bolton
15:00 GMT	Clough 68'	Report	Henry (yellow card) 21'; Luongo (yellow card) 60'; Phillips 90+3'	Stadium: Macron Stadium; Attendance: 14,085; Referee: Jeremy Simpson

23 February 2016 33	Sheffield Wednesday	1–1	Queens Park Rangers	Sheffield
19:45 GMT	Nuhiu 63'; Wallace (yellow card) 73'	Report	Tőzsér 57'; Phillips (yellow card) 76'	Stadium: Hillsborough; Attendance: 14,085; Referee: Jeremy Simpson

27 February 2016 34	Queens Park Rangers	2–0	Birmingham City	Shepherd's Bush
15:00 GMT	Chery 35'; Hoilett 40' (pen.)	Report		Stadium: Loftus Road; Attendance: 17,110; Referee: Roger East

5 March 2016 35	MK Dons	2–0	Queens Park Rangers	Milton Keynes
15:00 GMT	Forster-Caskey (yellow card) 5'; Lewington 49'; Murphy (yellow card) 78'; Carruthers (yellow card) 89'; Reeves 90+3' (pen.)	Report	Henry (yellow card) 79'	Stadium: Stadium MK; Attendance: 14,796; Referee: Keith Stroud

8 March 2016 36	Queens Park Rangers	2–0	Derby County	Shepherd's Bush
19:45 GMT	Chery 24'; Polter (yellow card) 83'; Angella 86'	Report		Stadium: Loftus Road; Attendance: 14,049; Referee: Neil Swarbrick

12 March 2016 37	Queens Park Rangers	3–0	Brentford	Shepherd's Bush
15:00 GMT	Hoilett 38'; Polter (yellow card) 45+1' (goal) 66'; Henry (yellow card) 48'; Hoilett (yellow card) 49'; Chery 71'; Luongo (yellow card) 90+1'	Report	Canos (yellow card) 32'; Woods (yellow card) 48'	Stadium: Loftus Road; Attendance: 17,894; Referee: Fred Graham

19 March 2016 38	Preston North End	1–1	Queens Park Rangers	Preston
15:00 GMT	Clarke (yellow card) 81'; Doyle 90+2'; Beckford (yellow card) 90+5'	Report	Polter 5'; Hoilett (yellow card) 72'; Faurlin (yellow card) 90+5'; Angella (yellow card) 90+5'; Hall (yellow card) 90+8'	Stadium: Deepdale; Attendance: 11,322; Referee: Andy Woolmer

1 April 2016 39	Queens Park Rangers	2–3	Middlesbrough	Shepherd's Bush
19:45 BST	Mackie 31'; Perch (yellow card) 77'; Chery 86'	Report	Rhodes 18'; Ramírez 51'; Gibson 57'	Stadium: Loftus Road; Attendance: 16,058; Referee: Simon Hooper

5 April 2016 40	Leeds United	1–1	Queens Park Rangers	Leeds
19:45 GMT	Wood 70'	Report	Chery 87' (pen.)	Stadium: Elland Road; Attendance: 17,388; Referee: James Adcock

9 April 2016 41	Queens Park Rangers	2–1	Charlton Athletic	Shepherd's Bush
15:00 BST	Phillips 45+2'; Kpekawa (yellow card) 66'; Onuoha (yellow card) 86'; Gladwin (yellow card) 90+1'; El Khayati 90+4'	Report	Cousins 62'	Stadium: Loftus Road; Attendance: 15,834; Referee: Andy Madley

16 April 2016 42	Cardiff City	0–0	Queens Park Rangers	Cardiff
15:00 BST	Pilkington (yellow card) 14'; Peltier (yellow card) 49'	Report	Konchesky (yellow card) 81'	Stadium: Cardiff City Stadium; Attendance: 27,874; Referee: Steve Martin

19 April 2016 43	Brighton & Hove Albion	4–0	Queens Park Rangers	Brighton
19:45 BST	Skalák (yellow card) 22', (goal) 51'; Knockaert 45+1', 84'; Goldson 73'	Report	Hall (yellow card) 72'; Polter (yellow card) 90+1'	Stadium: Falmer Stadium; Attendance: 25,411; Referee: Mark Heywood

23 April 2016 44	Queens Park Rangers	1–1	Reading	Shepherd's Bush
15:00 BST	Hall 35'	Report	Norwood (yellow card) 25'; Rakels 41'	Stadium: Loftus Road; Attendance: 16,225; Referee: Keith Hill

1 May 2016 45	Burnley	1–0	Queens Park Rangers	Burnley
16:45 BST	Vokes 61'	Report	Polter (yellow card) 4'; Kpekawa (yellow card) 44'	Stadium: Turf Moor; Attendance: 19,362; Referee: Jonathan Moss

7 May 2016 46	Queens Park Rangers	1–0	Bristol City	Shepherd's Bush
12:30 BST	Henry 63'	Report		Stadium: Loftus Road; Attendance: 16,679; Referee: Jeremy Simpson

=== Emirates FA Cup ===
9 January 2016 3rd Round	Nottingham Forest (Championship)	1−0	Queens Park Rangers	Nottingham
15:00 GMT	Ward 24'	BBC Report; QPR Report	Hall (yellow card) 18'; Doughty (yellow card) 44'	Stadium: City Ground; Attendance: 14,197; Referee: Oliver Langford

=== Capital One Cup ===
11 August 2015 1st round	Yeovil Town (League Two)	0–3	Queens Park Rangers	Yeovil
19:45 BST		BBC Report; QPR Report	Polter 15'; Emmanuel-Thomas 19'; Perch (yellow card) 25'; Onuoha 56'	Stadium: Huish Park; Attendance: 4,058; Referee: Oliver Langford

25 August 2015 2nd round	Queens Park Rangers	1–2	Carlisle United (League Two)	Shepherd's Bush
19:45 BST	Doughty (yellow card) 22'; Emmanuel-Thomas 40'	BBC Report; QPR Report	Sweeney (yellow card) 24'; Asamoah 37'; Kennedy 79'	Stadium: Loftus Road Stadium; Attendance: 5,501; Referee: James Linington

== Squad statistics ==
=== Statistics ===
As of 20 April 2016

No.	Pos	Nat	Player	Total		Sky Bet Championship		Capital One Cup		Emirates FA Cup	
No.	Pos	Nat	Player	Apps	Goals	Apps	Goals	Apps	Goals	Apps	Goals
1	GK	(England) ENG	Robert Green	25	0	24	0	1	0	0	0
3	DF	(Senegal) SEN	Armand Traoré	0	0	0	0	0	0	0	0
4	DF	(England) ENG	Grant Hall	39	1	34+2	1	2	0	1	0
5	DF	(England) ENG	Nedum Onuoha	45	3	43	2	1	1	1	0
6	DF	(England) ENG	Clint Hill	13	1	11	1	1	0	1	0
7	MF	(Scotland) SCO	Matt Phillips	43	8	41+1	8	1	0	0	0
8	MF	(Netherlands) NED	Tjaronn Chery	39	10	23+14	10	0+1	0	0+1	0
9	FW	(England) ENG	Charlie Austin †	16	10	12+4	10	0	0	0	0
9	FW	(Northern Ireland) NIR	Conor Washington	12	0	6+6	0	0	0	0	0
10	MF	(Netherlands) NED	Leroy Fer	19	2	14+5	2	0	0	0	0
11	MF	(England) ENG	Ben Gladwin	6	0	1+3	0	1	0	1	0
12	FW	(Scotland) SCO	Jamie Mackie	18	1	6+11	1	0	0	1	0
13	GK	(England) ENG	Joe Lumley	2	0	1	0	0	0	1	0
14	FW	(England) ENG	Jay Emmanuel-Thomas	15	5	5+7	3	2	2	1	0
15	DF	(England) ENG	Paul Konchesky	34	0	33+1	0	0	0	0	0
16	MF	(Wales) WAL	Michael Doughty	8	0	1+4	0	2	0	1	0
17	MF	(England) ENG	Oscar Gobern	2	0	0	0	2	0	0	0
18	MF	(Argentina) ARG	Alejandro Faurlín	27	0	25+2	0	0	0	0	0
19	FW	(Netherlands) NED	Abdenasser El Khayati	13	1	2+11	1	0	0	0	0
20	MF	(England) ENG	Karl Henry	34	0	31+2	0	0+1	0	0	0
21	MF	(Australia) AUS	Massimo Luongo	31	0	25+4	0	0+1	0	1	0
22	DF	(South Korea) KOR	Yun Suk-young	3	0	3	0	0	0	0	0
23	MF	(Canada) CAN	Junior Hoilett	29	6	23+4	6	1+1	0	0	0
24	DF	(England) ENG	James Perch	36	0	33+1	0	1	0	0+1	0
25	GK	(England) ENG	Alex Smithies	19	0	17+1	0	1	0	0	0
26	DF	(Italy) ITA	Gabriele Angella	18	1	16+1	1	0	0	1	0
28	MF	(Hungary) HUN	Dániel Tőzsér	17	1	11+5	1	0	0	1	0
29	GK	(England) ENG	Matt Ingram	1	0	1	0	0	0	0	0
30	MF	(Brazil) BRA	Sandro	11	0	9+2	0	0	0	0	0
32	MF	(Senegal) SEN	Samba Diakité	0	0	0	0	0	0	0	0
33	FW	(Germany) GER	Sebastian Polter	30	7	16+12	6	2	1	0	0
34	MF	(Canada) CAN	Michael Petrasso	6	0	2+3	0	0	0	0+1	0
36	FW	(England) ENG	Tyler Blackwood	2	0	0+1	0	0+1	0	0	0
37	MF	(Republic of Ireland) IRL	Frankie Sutherland	0	0	0	0	0	0	0	0
38	DF	(England) ENG	Darnell Furlong	1	0	0	0	1	0	0	0
39	FW	(Republic of Ireland) IRL	Reece Grego-Cox	1	0	0	0	1	0	0	0
40	DF	(England) ENG	Jack Robinson	1	0	1	0	0	0	0	0
41	MF	(Montserrat) MSR	Brandon Comley	1	0	0	0	0+1	0	0	0
42	DF	(England) ENG	Cole Kpekawa	4	0	0+2	0	2	0	0	0

† denotes players that left the club during the season.

=== Goals ===
As of 20 April 2016

Rank	Player	Position	Championship	League Cup	FA Cup	Total
1	(England) Charlie Austin	FW	10	0	0	10
1	(Netherlands) Tjaronn Chery	MF	10	0	0	10
3	(Scotland) Matt Phillips	MF	8	0	0	8
4	(Germany) Sebastian Polter	FW	6	1	0	7
5	(Canada) Junior Hoilett	MF	6	0	0	6
6	(England) Jay Emmanuel-Thomas	FW	3	2	0	5
7	(England) Nedum Onuoha	DF	2	1	0	3
8	(Netherlands) Leroy Fer	MF	2	0	0	2
9	(England) Clint Hill	DF	1	0	0	1
9	(Hungary) Dániel Tőzsér	MF	1	0	0	1
9	(Italy) Gabriele Angella	DF	1	0	0	1
9	(Scotland) Jamie Mackie	FW	1	0	0	1
9	(Netherlands) Abdenasser El Khayati	FW	1	0	0	1
Own goal			0	0	0	0
Total			52	4	0	56

=== Own Goals ===
As of 10 April 2016

Rank	Player	Position	Championship	League Cup	FA Cup	Total
Total			0	0	0	0

=== Clean sheets ===
As of 20 April 2016

Rank	Player	Position	Championship	League Cup	FA Cup	Total
1	(England) Robert Green	GK	8	1	0	9
2	(England) Alex Smithies	GK	6	0	0	6
3	(England) Matt Ingram	GK	1	0	0	1
Total			15	1	0	16

=== Discipline ===
==== Bookings ====
As of 9 January 2016

N	P	Nat.	Name	Championship			League Cup			FA Cup			Total			Notes
N	P	Nat.	Name	Yellow card	Second yellow card	Red card	Yellow card	Second yellow card	Red card	Yellow card	Second yellow card	Red card	Yellow card	Second yellow card	Red card	Notes
1	GK	(England)	Robert Green			1									1	
4	DF	(England)	Grant Hall	1						1			2			
5	DF	(England)	Nedum Onuoha	6									6			
6	DF	(England)	Clint Hill	2									2			
7	MF	(Scotland)	Matt Phillips	3									3			
8	MF	(Netherlands)	Tjaronn Chery	1									1			
9	FW	(England)	Charlie Austin	4									4			
10	MF	(Netherlands)	Leroy Fer	2		1							2		1	
15	DF	(England)	Paul Konchesky	3									3			
16	MF	(Wales)	Michael Doughty				1			1			2			
18	MF	(Argentina)	Alejandro Faurlín	2									2			
20	MF	(England)	Karl Henry	3									3			
22	MF	(South Korea)	Yun Suk-young	1									1			
23	MF	(Canada)	Junior Hoilett	1									1			
24	DF	(England)	James Perch	4	1		1						5	1		
25	GK	(England)	Alex Smithies	1									1			
26	DF	(Italy)	Gabriele Angella	2									2			
28	MF	(Hungary)	Dániel Tőzsér	2									2			
30	MF	(Brazil)	Sandro	1									1			

Last updated: 1 January 2016
Source: Matches
Ordered by (red card) , (second yellow card) and (yellow card)
(yellow card) = Number of bookings; (second yellow card) = Number of sending offs after a second yellow card; (red card) = Number of sending offs by a direct red card.

=== Penalties ===
Date	Won by	Taken by	Opposition	Scored?
22 August 2015	(Germany) Sebastian Polter	(England) Charlie Austin	Rotherham United	Yes
27 February 2016	(Germany) Sebastian Polter	(Canada) Junior Hoilett	Birmingham City	Yes
5 April 2016	(Germany) Sebastian Polter	(Netherlands) Tjaronn Chery	Leeds United	Yes

== Awards ==
=== External awards ===
==== Managerial and boardroom ====
Name	Position	Award	Date	Nominated/Won	Source
Chris Ramsey	Head Coach	Football League Championship Manager of the Month August	3 September 2015	Nominated	

=== Club awards ===
==== Players ====
Name	No.	Pos.	Award	Date	Nominated/Won	Source
(Netherlands) Tjaronn Chery	8	MF	AirAsia POTM August	2 September 2015	Won	
(England) Charlie Austin	9	FW	AirAsia POTM September	1 October 2015	Won	
(England) Jay Emmanuel-Thomas	14	FW	AirAsia POTM October	5 November 2015	Won	
(England) Grant Hall	4	DF	AirAsia POTM November	2 December 2015	Won	
(Canada) Junior Hoilett	23	MF	AirAsia POTM December	1 January 2016	Won	
(Germany) Sebastian Polter	33	FW	AirAsia POTM January	1 February 2016	Won	
(England) Alex Smithies	25	GK	AirAsia POTM February	2 March 2016	Won	
(Netherlands) Tjaronn Chery	8	MF	AirAsia POTM March	1 April 2016	Won	
(Netherlands) Tjaronn Chery	8	MF	AirAsia POTM April	3 May 2016	Won	
(England) Grant Hall	4	DF	Supporters’ Player of the Year	5 May 2015	Won	
(Netherlands) Tjaronn Chery	8	MF	Ray Jones Players’ Player of the Year	5 May 2015	Won	
(England) Darnell Furlong	38	DF	Daphne Biggs Supporters’ Young Player of the Year	5 May 2015	Won	
(Canada) Junior Hoilett	23	MF	Kiyan Prince Goal of the Season	5 May 2015	Won	
(Netherlands) Tjaronn Chery	8	MF	Junior Hoops’ Player of the Year	5 May 2015	Won	
