= Grant Hall =

English footballer (born 1991)

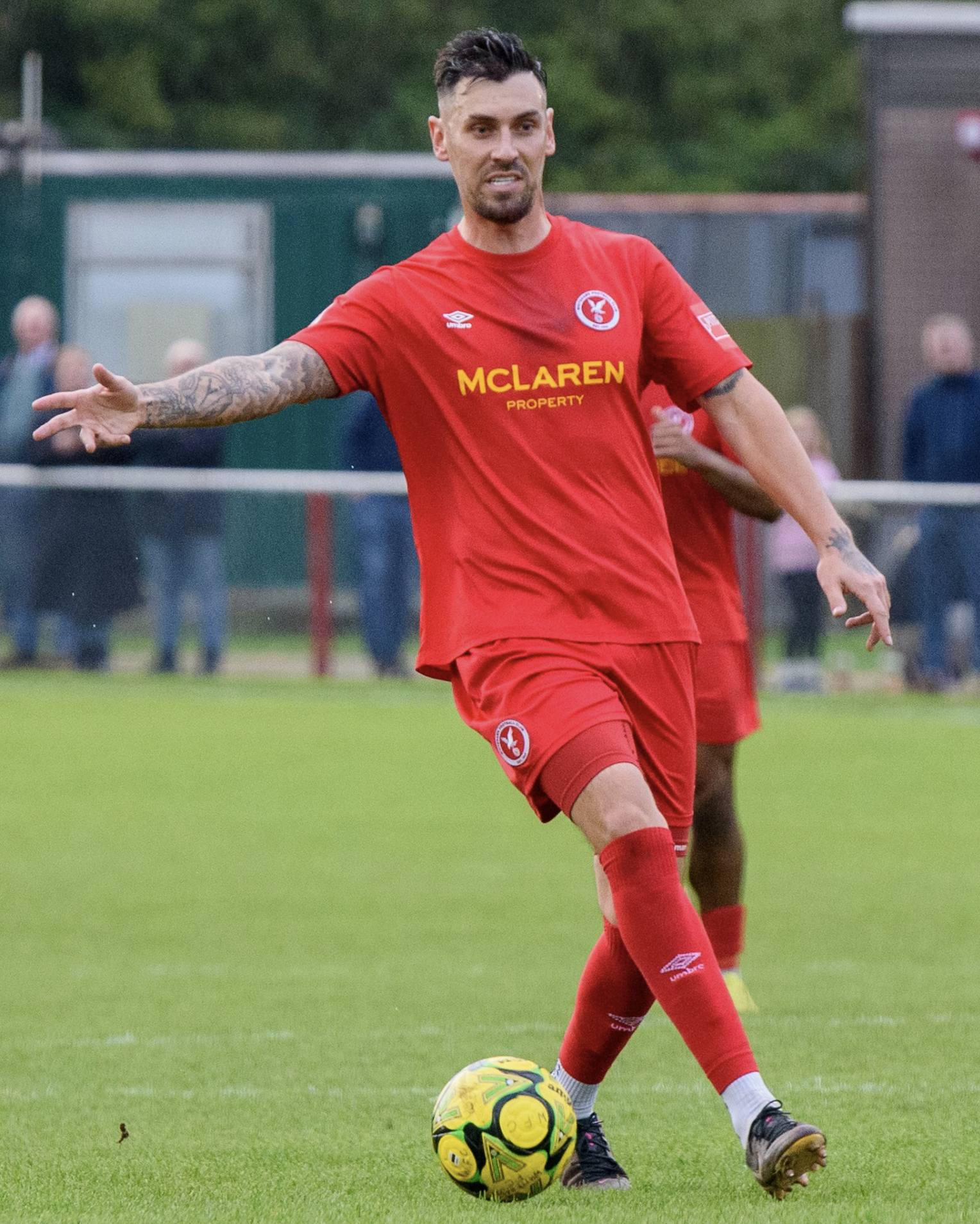

Personal information
- Full name: Grant Terry Hall
- Date of birth: 29 October 1991 (age 35)
- Place of birth: Brighton, England
- Height: 1.92 m (6 ft 4 in)
- Position: Defender

Team information
- Current team: Whitehawk

Youth career
- –2007: Brighton & Hove Albion
- 2007–2008: Lewes

Senior career*
| Years | Team | Apps | (Gls) |
| 2008–2009 | Lewes | 8 | (0) |
| 2009 | → Whitehawk (dual reg.) | 0 | (0) |
| 2009–2012 | Brighton & Hove Albion | 1 | (0) |
| 2009–2010 | → Bognor Regis Town (loan) | 4 | (0) |
| 2010 | → Lewes (loan) | 2 | (0) |
| 2010 | → Whitehawk (loan) | 8 | (0) |
| 2011 | → Lewes (loan) | 5 | (0) |
| 2012–2015 | Tottenham Hotspur | 0 | (0) |
| 2013–2014 | → Swindon Town (loan) | 27 | (0) |
| 2014–2015 | → Birmingham City (loan) | 7 | (0) |
| 2015 | → Blackpool (loan) | 12 | (1) |
| 2015–2020 | Queens Park Rangers | 119 | (6) |
| 2020–2023 | Middlesbrough | 27 | (2) |
| 2022–2023 | → Rotherham United (loan) | 20 | (0) |
| 2023–2024 | Rotherham United | 8 | (1) |
| 2024–2025 | Swindon Town | 13 | (0) |
| 2025– | Whitehawk | 38 | (5) |
- * Club domestic league appearances and goals as of 19:53 24 October 2026 (UTC)

Grant Terry Hall (born 29 October 1991) is an English professional footballer who plays as a central defender for Isthmian League Premier Division club Whitehawk.

He has played league football for Brighton & Hove Albion, Swindon Town, Birmingham City, Blackpool, Queens Park Rangers, Middlesbrough and Rotherham United.

== Early and personal life ==
Grant Terry Hall was born in Brighton on 29 October 1991. His father, Terry, and brother, Craig, both played football at county level, and Hall himself played for AFC Jelfish and Hove Rivervale before joining Brighton & Hove Albion's centre of excellence at the age of 11 or 12. At 16, he was not offered a scholarship, which he attributed in part to his natural shyness. He attended Cardinal Newman Catholic School, Hove, and City College Brighton and Hove, where he spent time at the college's Football Development Academy and considered training as a PE teacher.

== Club career ==
=== Lewes ===
After leaving Albion, Hall joined Conference South club Lewes. He was training with the first team as a 16-year-old, helped the under-18s reach the third round of the FA Youth Cup, and made his senior debut on 25 November 2008 in the Sussex Senior Cup. Hall signed for Sussex County League club Whitehawk on a dual registration basis, in order to get playing time in men's football, but instead he started for Lewes in the FA Trophy in mid-January 2009, made his debut in the Conference Premier a few days later, against Mansfield Town, and finished the season with five Conference appearances, of which four were in the starting eleven. Hall played three times in the Conference South and twice in that season's FA Cup, as well as trialling with Gillingham and appearing for Brighton & Hove Albion's youth team.

=== Brighton & Hove Albion ===
On 6 October 2009, Brighton & Hove Albion signed Hall on professional terms to the end of the season. He went out on loan twice, a month at Isthmian League Premier Division club Bognor Regis Town and a month back at Lewes, disrupted by a thigh injury sustained while training with his parent club, and was a member of the Brighton reserve team that won the Sussex Senior Cup. His contract was extended for at least another year. During the 2010–11 season, Hall had spells out on loan at Whitehawk, who were then playing in the Isthmian League Division One South, and another month as defensive cover at Lewes.

The 2011 Sussex Senior Cup final between Brighton Reserves and Eastbourne Borough was played at Brighton's new stadium on 16 July 2011 as a warm-up event prior to the official opening a couple of weeks later. Brighton won 2–0, and it was from Hall's chipped cross that Gary Hart opened the scoring with the venue's first competitive goal. On 26 December 2011, Hall was named as a substitute for Brighton's visits to Reading and Coventry City on 26 and 31 December 2011, and made his first-team debut for Brighton on 2 January 2012, replacing Mauricio Taricco after 54 minutes of the 3–0 victory at home to Southampton in the Championship. Hall made his first senior start five days later in the FA Cup third round against Wrexham, and also started in the replay.

=== Tottenham Hotspur ===
During May 2012, Hall was offered a new three-year contract amid interest from Premier League club Tottenham Hotspur. He rejected the offer, and signed for Tottenham Hotspur. The defender made his debut during a pre-season friendly against Kingstonian.

==== Loan spells ====
During July 2013, Hall and fellow Tottenham teammate Massimo Luongo joined League One side Swindon Town on a season-long loan deal.

Hall signed for Football League Championship club Birmingham City on loan for the 2014–15 season. He made his debut in the starting eleven for the opening-day defeat at Middlesbrough, and formed a partnership with David Edgar at the start of the season. However, the return of captain Paul Robinson to the starting eleven and the arrival of Michael Morrison pushed Hall down the pecking order, he played his last game for the club on 25 October, and his loan was terminated at the beginning of the January 2015 transfer window.

He spent the second half of the season at Blackpool, also of the Championship.

=== Queens Park Rangers ===
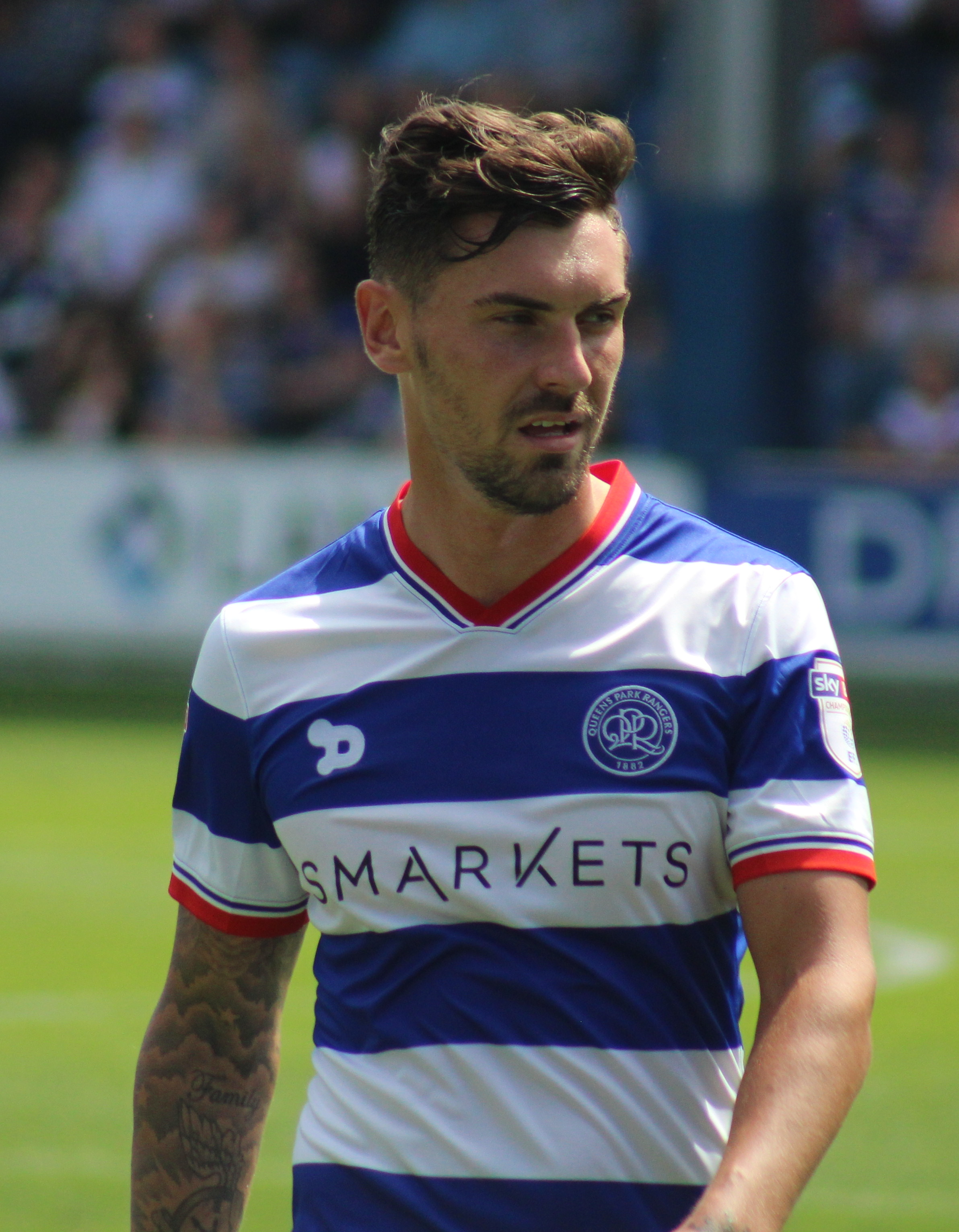
Hall playing for QPR in 2016

On 7 August 2015, Hall signed for Championship club Queens Park Rangers on a two-year deal after a successful trial at the club. He made his competitive QPR debut five days later in a 3–0 win against Yeovil Town in the first round of the 2015–16 Football League Cup.

Hall was a regular in QPR's defence throughout the season, and his performances were rewarded with the Supporters' Player of the Year award for 2015–16.

Hall left QPR on 19 June 2020 after failing to agree a new contract.

=== Middlesbrough ===
On 31 July 2020, Hall signed for Middlesbrough on a free transfer. He scored his first goal for Middlesbrough in a 2–1 win at Coventry City on 2 March 2021. In July 2022 he was loaned to Rotherham United for the 2022–23 season, however he suffered a serious injury in February 2023, which effectively ended his season. Hall was released by Middlesbrough at the end of the 2022–23 season.

=== Rotherham United ===
On 1 July 2023, Hall returned to Rotherham United on a permanent basis.

On 7 May 2024, after the club were relegated, Rotherham announced the player would be released in the summer after his contract expired.

=== Swindon Town ===
On 10 July 2024, Hall joined League Two side Swindon Town on a free transfer.

On 9 May 2025, Swindon announced the player would be leaving in June when his contract expired.

=== Whitehawk ===
On 30 September 2025, Hall joined Isthmian League Premier Division club Whitehawk, being appointed captain for the start of the 26-27 season.

== International career ==
Hall indicated that he would be likely to accept a call-up for the Republic of Ireland national team if asked.

== Personal life ==
Hall has two children with former glamour model Chloe Goodman. They married in the Algarve, Portugal in June, 2024.

== Career statistics ==
As of match played 15 February 2025

Appearances and goals by club, season and competition
| Club | Season | League | | | National cup | | League cup | | Other | | Total | |
| Club | Season | Division | Apps | Goals | Apps | Goals | Apps | Goals | Apps | Goals | Apps | Goals |
|---|---|---|---|---|---|---|---|---|---|---|---|---|
| Lewes | 2008–09 | Conference Premier | 5 | 0 | 0 | 0 | — | | | | 5 | 0 |
| Lewes | 2009–10 | Conference South | 3 | 0 | 2 | 0 | — | | | | 5 | 0 |
| Lewes | Total | | 8 | 0 | 2 | 0 | — | | | | 10 | 0 |
| Brighton & Hove Albion | 2009–10 | League One | 0 | 0 | 0 | 0 | — | | — | | 0 | 0 |
| Brighton & Hove Albion | 2010–11 | League One | 0 | 0 | 0 | 0 | 0 | 0 | 0 | 0 | 0 | 0 |
| Brighton & Hove Albion | 2011–12 | Championship | 1 | 0 | 2 | 0 | 0 | 0 | — | | 3 | 0 |
| Brighton & Hove Albion | Total | | 1 | 0 | 2 | 0 | — | | — | | 3 | 0 |
| Bognor Regis Town (loan) | 2009–10 | Isthmian League Premier Division | 4 | 0 | — | | — | | | | 4 | 0 |
| Lewes (loan) | 2009–10 | Conference South | 2 | 0 | — | | — | | 0 | 0 | 2 | 0 |
| Whitehawk (loan) | 2010–11 | Isthmian League Division One South | 8 | 0 | | | — | | | | 8 | 0 |
| Lewes (loan) | 2010–11 | Conference South | 5 | 0 | 0 | 0 | — | | | | 5 | 0 |
| Tottenham Hotspur | 2012–13 | Premier League | 0 | 0 | 0 | 0 | 0 | 0 | 0 | 0 | 0 | 0 |
| Tottenham Hotspur | 2014–15 | Premier League | 0 | 0 | 0 | 0 | — | | — | | 0 | 0 |
| Tottenham Hotspur | Total | | 0 | 0 | 0 | 0 | 0 | 0 | 0 | 0 | 0 | 0 |
| Swindon Town (loan) | 2013–14 | League One | 27 | 0 | 1 | 0 | 3 | 0 | 3 (Note: Appearances in Football League Trophy) | 0 | 34 | 0 |
| Birmingham City (loan) | 2014–15 | Championship | 7 | 0 | — | | 2 | 0 | — | | 9 | 0 |
| Blackpool (loan) | 2014–15 | Championship | 12 | 1 | — | | — | | — | | 12 | 1 |
| Queens Park Rangers | 2015–16 | Championship | 39 | 1 | 1 | 0 | 2 | 0 | — | | 42 | 1 |
| Queens Park Rangers | 2016–17 | Championship | 34 | 0 | 1 | 0 | 1 | 0 | — | | 36 | 0 |
| Queens Park Rangers | 2017–18 | Championship | 4 | 0 | 1 | 0 | 0 | 0 | — | | 5 | 0 |
| Queens Park Rangers | 2018–19 | Championship | 12 | 0 | 3 | 0 | 2 | 0 | — | | 17 | 0 |
| Queens Park Rangers | 2019–20 | Championship | 30 | 5 | 0 | 0 | 0 | 0 | — | | 30 | 5 |
| Queens Park Rangers | Total | | 119 | 6 | 6 | 0 | 5 | 0 | — | | 130 | 6 |
| Middlesbrough | 2020–21 | Championship | 19 | 2 | 0 | 0 | 1 | 0 | — | | 20 | 2 |
| Middlesbrough | 2021–22 | Championship | 8 | 0 | 0 | 0 | 0 | 0 | — | | 8 | 0 |
| Middlesbrough | Total | | 27 | 2 | 0 | 0 | 1 | 0 | — | | 28 | 2 |
| Rotherham United (loan) | 2022–23 | Championship | 20 | 0 | 0 | 0 | 1 | 0 | — | | 21 | 0 |
| Rotherham United | 2023–24 | Championship | 8 | 1 | 0 | 0 | 0 | 0 | — | | 8 | 1 |
| Swindon Town | 2024–25 | League Two | 13 | 0 | 1 | 1 | 1 | 0 | 2 (Note: Appearances in EFL Trophy) | 0 | 17 | 1 |
| Career total | | | 261 | 10 | 12 | 1 | 13 | 0 | 5 | 0 | 291 | 11 |

== Honours ==
Individual

- Queens Park Rangers Supporters' Player of the Year: 2015–16
