= Perry Suckling =

English footballer and coach

Personal information
- Full name: Perry John Suckling
- Date of birth: 12 October 1965 (age 61)
- Place of birth: Leyton, England
- Height: 6 ft 1 in (1.85 m)
- Position: Goalkeeper

Team information
- Current team: Chelmsford City (goalkeeping coach)

Senior career*
| Years | Team | Apps | (Gls) |
| 1983–1986 | Coventry City | 27 | (0) |
| 1986–1988 | Manchester City | 39 | (0) |
| 1988–1992 | Crystal Palace | 59 | (0) |
| 1989–1990 | → West Ham United (loan) | 6 | (0) |
| 1991 | → Brentford (loan) | 8 | (0) |
| 1992 | Ernest Borel | | |
| 1992–1994 | Watford | 39 | (0) |
| 1994–1996 | Doncaster Rovers | 30 | (0) |
| 1996–1997 | Wits University | | |
| 1997–1999 | SuperSport United | | |
| 1999–2000 | Dagenham & Redbridge | | |
| 2000–2001 | King's Lynn | | |

International career
| 1983–1984 | England Youth | 12 | (0) |
| 1986–1988 | England U21 | 10 | (0) |
- * Club domestic league appearances and goals

Perry John Suckling (born 12 October 1965, in Leyton) is an English former footballer who played as a goalkeeper. Suckling is currently goalkeeping coach at Chelmsford City.

== Coaching career ==
In 2015 he was appointed academy manager at Queens Park Rangers. He stayed in this post for two seasons before making the switch to Tottenham Hotspur in 2017 to become the academy and goalkeeping coach. Suckling became Tottenham Women's goalkeeping coach in August 2023 but left the club in August 2024. In July 2026, after a season at Dagenham & Redbridge, Suckling joined Chelmsford City as goalkeeping coach.

== Honours ==
Crystal Palace

- Football League Second Division play-offs: 1989

Ernest Borel

- Hong Kong Viceroy Cup: 1992
- Hong Kong FA Cup: 1992
