= 2017–18 Aston Villa F.C. season =

English football club season

Aston Villa
2017–18 season
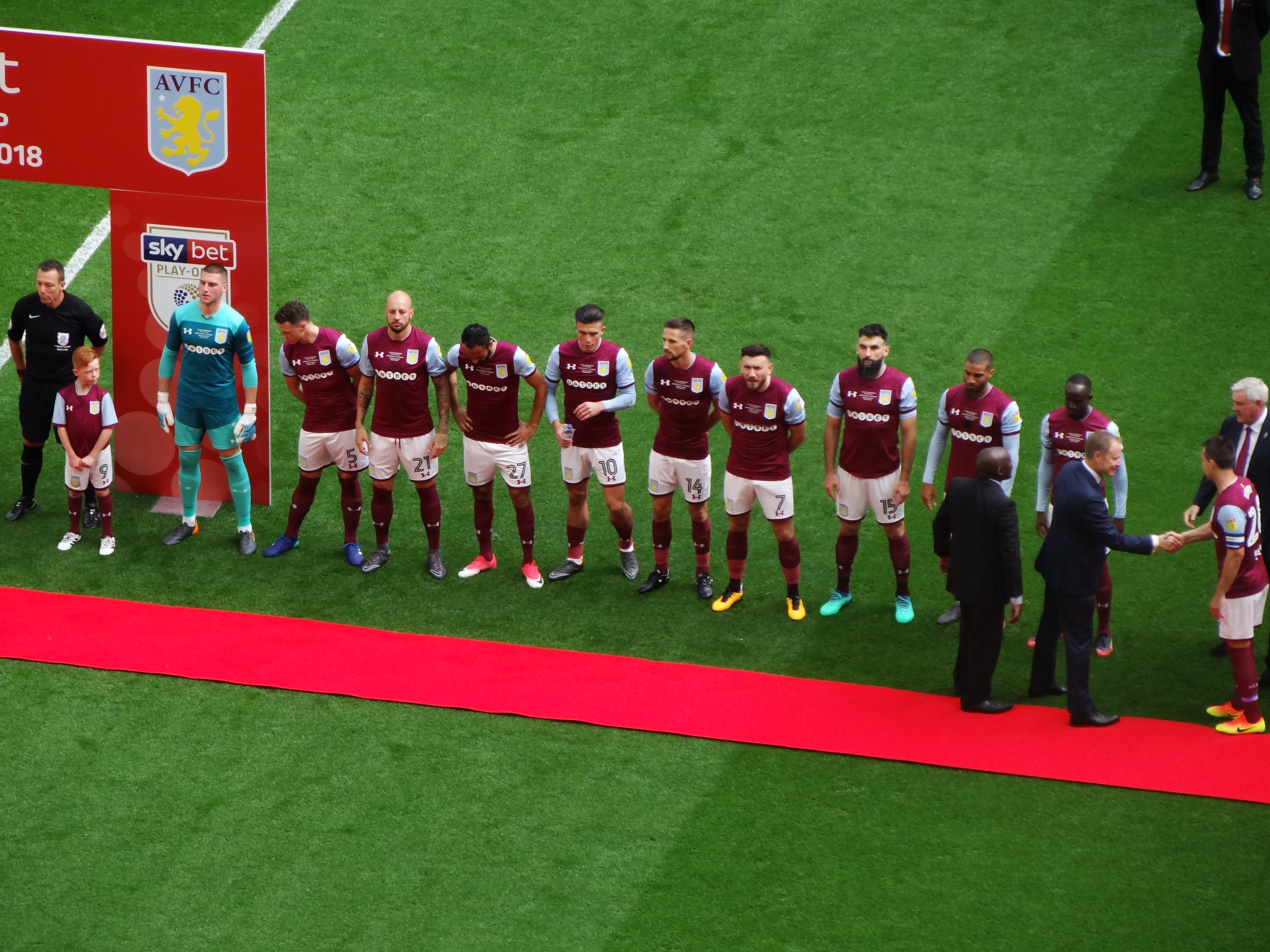
- Aston Villa players lining up at the EFL Championship play-off final against Fulham in May 2018
- Chairman: Tony Xia
- Manager: Steve Bruce
- Stadium: Villa Park
- Championship: 4th
- Play-offs: Runners-up (vs. Fulham)
- FA Cup: Third round (vs. Peterborough United)
- EFL Cup: Third round (vs. Middlesbrough)
- Top goalscorer: League: Albert Adomah (14); All: Albert Adomah (15)
- Highest home attendance: 41,745 vs Derby County, 28 April 2018
- Lowest home attendance: 11,197 vs Middlesbrough, 19 September 2017
| Home colours | Away colours |

Second City Derby
- 57--37--32

The 2017-18 season was Aston Villa's 2nd season in the Football League Championship. The 2017–18 EFL Championship season was Villa's 143rd season in English football. Villa secured a play-off place and defeated Middlesbrough to reach the final, but lost 1–0 to Fulham in the final and thus missed out on promotion to the Premier League.

John Terry (32) joined Aston Villa and was appointed captain. Other signings included Ahmed Elmohamady (113), Glenn Whelan (68), Robert Snodgrass (40), Josh Onomah (33), Axel Tuanzebe (39), Lewis Grabban (15) and Christopher Samba (12).

== Competitions ==
=== Championship ===
==== League table ====
| Pos | Team | Pld | W | D | L | GF | GA | GD | Pts | Promotion, qualification or relegation |
|---|---|---|---|---|---|---|---|---|---|---|
| 2 | Cardiff City (P) | 46 | 27 | 9 | 10 | 69 | 39 | +30 | 90 | Promotion to the Premier League |
| 3 | Fulham (O, P) | 46 | 25 | 13 | 8 | 79 | 46 | +33 | 88 | Qualification for Championship play-offs (Note: Four teams play for one spot and promotion to the Premier League.) |
| 4 | Aston Villa | 46 | 24 | 11 | 11 | 72 | 42 | +30 | 83 | Qualification for Championship play-offs |
| 5 | Middlesbrough | 46 | 22 | 10 | 14 | 67 | 45 | +22 | 76 | Qualification for Championship play-offs |
| 6 | Derby County | 46 | 20 | 15 | 11 | 70 | 48 | +22 | 75 | Qualification for Championship play-offs |

Source: English Football League
Rules for classification: 1) Points; 2) Goal difference; 3) Number of goals scored
(O) Play-off winners; (P) Promoted

==== Results summary ====
| Overall | | | | | | | | Home | | | | | | Away | | | | | |
| Pld | W | D | L | GF | GA | GD | Pts | W | D | L | GF | GA | GD | W | D | L | GF | GA | GD |
|---|---|---|---|---|---|---|---|---|---|---|---|---|---|---|---|---|---|---|---|
| 46 | 24 | 11 | 11 | 72 | 42 | +30 | 83 | 14 | 7 | 2 | 42 | 19 | +23 | 10 | 4 | 9 | 30 | 23 | +7 |

Last updated: 14 April 2018.
Source: Football League Championship

==== Results by matchday ====
| Matchday | 1 | 2 | 3 | 4 | 5 | 6 | 7 | 8 | 9 | 10 | 11 | 12 | 13 | 14 | 15 | 16 | 17 | 18 | 19 | 20 | 21 | 22 | 23 | 24 | 25 | 26 | 27 | 28 | 29 | 30 | 31 | 32 | 33 | 34 | 35 | 36 | 37 | 38 | 39 | 40 | 41 | 42 | 43 | 44 | 45 | 46 |
|---|---|---|---|---|---|---|---|---|---|---|---|---|---|---|---|---|---|---|---|---|---|---|---|---|---|---|---|---|---|---|---|---|---|---|---|---|---|---|---|---|---|---|---|---|---|---|
| Ground | H | A | A | H | A | H | H | A | H | A | H | H | H | A | A | H | A | H | H | A | H | A | H | A | A | H | A | H | A | H | H | A | H | A | H | A | H | A | A | H | A | H | H | A | H | A |
| Result | D | L | L | W | D | D | D | W | W | W | W | L | W | D | W | L | W | W | W | D | D | L | D | L | W | W | W | W | W | W | W | L | D | W | L | W | W | L | D | W | L | W | W | W | D | L |
| Position | 10 | 21 | 23 | 16 | 15 | 18 | 18 | 13 | 10 | 8 | 7 | 7 | 5 | 6 | 5 | 6 | 5 | 4 | 4 | 4 | 5 | 5 | 6 | 8 | 7 | 5 | 4 | 4 | 3 | 3 | 2 | 3 | 3 | 3 | 3 | 3 | 3 | 4 | 4 | 4 | 4 | 4 | 4 | 4 | 4 | 4 |

Updated to match(es) played on 6 May 2018. Source: Statto.com
A = Away; H = Home; W = Win; D = Draw; L = Loss

==== Matches ====
On 21 June 2017, the league fixtures were announced.

| 5 August 2017 1 | Aston Villa | 1–1 | Hull City | Birmingham |
| 17:30 BST | Agbonlahor 7'; Lansbury (yellow card) 17'; Whelan (yellow card) 22' | Report | Bowen 62' | Stadium: Villa Park; Attendance: 31,241 (1,211 away); Referee: Andrew Madley |

| 12 August 2017 2 | Cardiff City | 3–0 | Aston Villa | Leckwith |
| 15:00 BST | Mendez-Laing 21', 71'; Hoilett 60' | Report | Taylor (yellow card) 55' | Stadium: Cardiff City Stadium; Attendance: 23,899 (4,803 away); Referee: Tim Robinson |

| 15 August 2017 3 | Reading | 2–1 | Aston Villa | Reading |
| 20:00 | Moore (yellow card) 36'; Whelan 49' (o.g.); Barrow 55'; McCleary (yellow card) 90' | Report | Green (yellow card) 27'; Hourihane (yellow card) 37' (goal) 87' | Stadium: Madejski Stadium; Attendance: 20,144 (3,935 away); Referee: Kevin Friend |

| 19 August 2017 4 | Aston Villa | 4–2 | Norwich City | Birmingham |
| 15:00 BST | Hourihane 22', 68', 85'; Green 42'; Hutton (yellow card) 58' | Report | Murphy (yellow card) 36' (goal) 60'; Franke (yellow card) 78'; Oliveira 79' (yellow card) 86' | Stadium: Villa Park; Attendance: 29,157 (2,389 away); Referee: Jeremy Simpson |

| 25 August 2017 5 | Bristol City | 1–1 | Aston Villa | Ashton Gate |
| 19:45 BST | Paterson 60'; Brownhill (yellow card) 87' | Report | Onomah 64' (yellow card) 85' | Stadium: Ashton Gate Stadium; Attendance: 21,542 (3,106 away); Referee: Geoff Eltringham |

| 9 September 2017 6 | Aston Villa | 0–0 | Brentford | Birmingham |
| 15:00 BST | | Report | | Stadium: Villa Park; Attendance: 29,799 (1,259 away); Referee: Scott Duncan |

| 12 September 2017 7 | Aston Villa | 0–0 | Middlesbrough | Birmingham |
| 19:30 BST | Snodgrass (yellow card) 31'; Lansbury (red card) 64'; Kodjia (yellow card) 83' | Report | Traoré (red card) 4'; Christie (yellow card) 80' | Stadium: Villa Park; Attendance: 26,631 (1,378 away); Referee: James Linington |

| 16 September 2017 8 | Barnsley | 0–3 | Aston Villa | Barnsley |
| 17:30 BST | Hammill (yellow card) 25' | Report | Adomah 19', 44 pen.' Davis 55'; Whelan (yellow card) 76'; Hourihane (yellow card) 90+3' | Stadium: Oakwell; Attendance: 14,633 (3,268 away); Referee: Simon Hooper |

| 23 September 2017 9 | Aston Villa | 2–1 | Nottingham Forest | Birmingham |
| 17:30 BST | Adomah 15'; Hourihane 60'; Taylor (yellow card) 90+5' | Report | Bridcutt (yellow card) 42'; Murphy 52'; Brereton (yellow card) 59' | Stadium: Villa Park; Attendance: 28,554 (2,026 away); Referee: Tim Robinson |

| 26 September 2017 10 | Burton Albion | 0–4 | Aston Villa | Burton upon Trent |
| 19:45 BST | | Report | Davis 13'; Adomah 16'; Snodgrass 32'; Onomah 71' | Stadium: Pirelli Stadium; Attendance: 5,786 (1,654 away); Referee: Jon Moss |

| 30 September 2017 11 | Aston Villa | 1–0 | Bolton Wanderers | Birmingham |
| 15:00 BST | Whelan (yellow card) 11'; Kodjia 39' (pen.); Taylor (red card) 90+4' | Report | Wheater (yellow card) 59'; Beevers (yellow card) 68'; Henry (yellow card) 90' | Stadium: Villa Park; Attendance: 31,451 (1,110 away); Referee: Jeremy Simpson |

| 14 October 2017 12 | Wolverhampton Wanderers | 2–0 | Aston Villa | Wolverhampton |
| 17:30 BST | Jota 55'; Bonatini 72' | Report | Snodgrass (yellow card) 12'; Hourihane (yellow card) 42' | Stadium: Molineux Stadium; Attendance: 30,239 (2,758 away); Referee: Andy Davies |

| 21 October 2017 13 | Aston Villa | 2–1 | Fulham | Birmingham |
| 15:00 BST | Terry 23'; Adomah 49'; Onomah (yellow card) 82' | Report | Norwood (yellow card) 9'; Fonte (yellow card) 15'; Johansen 45+1' | Stadium: Villa Park; Attendance: 30,724 (1,341 away); Referee: Mike Jones |

| 29 October 2017 14 | Birmingham City | 0–0 | Aston Villa | Birmingham |
| 12:00 GMT | Adams (yellow card) 16'; N'Doye (yellow card) 52'; Roberts (yellow card) 74' | Report | Snodgrass (yellow card) 16'; Onomah (yellow card) 76' | Stadium: St Andrew's; Attendance: 24,408 (2,078 away); Referee: Andrew Madley |

| 1 November 2017 15 | Preston North End | 0–2 | Aston Villa | Preston |
| 19:45 BST | Browne (yellow card) 55' | Report | Chester 12'; Snodgrass 33'; Davis (yellow card) 63' | Stadium: Deepdale; Attendance: 14,212 (2,828 away); Referee: Peter Bankes |

| 4 November 2017 16 | Aston Villa | 1–2 | Sheffield Wednesday | Birmingham |
| 15:00 GMT | Samba 90+6' | Report | Reach 1'; Rhodes 23'; Wallace (yellow card) 56' | Stadium: Villa Park; Attendance: 33,154 (2,718 away); Referee: Geoff Eltringham |

| 18 November 2017 17 | Queens Park Rangers | 1–2 | Aston Villa | Shepherd's Bush |
| 15:00 BST | Mackie 19'; Robinson (yellow card) 53'; Manning (yellow card) 76' | Report | Whelan (yellow card) 38'; Adomah 45+3', 58'; Snodgrass (yellow card) 60'; Taylor (yellow card) 90+1' | Stadium: Loftus Road; Attendance: 16,934 (3,200 away); Referee: Darren England |

| 22 November 2017 18 | Aston Villa | 2–1 | Sunderland | Birmingham |
| 19:45 GMT | Adomah 10'; Onomah 49' | Report | Grabban 72' | Stadium: Villa Park; Attendance: 27,662 (824 away); Referee: Stephen Martin |

| 25 November 2017 19 | Aston Villa | 2–0 | Ipswich Town | Birmingham |
| 15:00 GMT | Adomah 36', 66' | Report | Connolly (yellow card) 56'; Huws (yellow card) 73' | Stadium: Villa Park; Attendance: 30,427 (1,364 away); Referee: Tony Harrington |

| 1 December 2017 20 | Leeds United | 1–1 | Aston Villa | Leeds |
| 19:45 GMT | Jansson 19' (yellow card) 74'; Sáiz (yellow card) 77' | Report | Hourihane (yellow card) 28'; Snodgrass (yellow card) 45+2'; Lansbury 71'; Hutton (yellow card) 90+2' | Stadium: Elland Road; Attendance: 30,547 (2,443 away); Referee: Peter Bankes |

| 9 December 2017 21 | Aston Villa | 0–0 | Millwall | Birmingham |
| 15:00 GMT | Whelan (yellow card) 76' | Report | Saville (yellow card) 55'; Wallace (yellow card) 70'; Cooper (yellow card) 90' | Stadium: Villa Park; Attendance: 29,628 (2,088 away); Referee: Andrew Davies |

| 16 December 2017 22 | Derby County | 2–0 | Aston Villa | Derby |
| 15:00 GMT | Weimann 24'; Russell 90+1' | Report | | Stadium: Pride Park Stadium; Attendance: 28,118 (3,143 away); Referee: Lee Probert |

| 23 December 2017 23 | Aston Villa | 2–2 | Sheffield United | Birmingham |
| 17:30 GMT | Adomah 4' (pen.); Jedinak 9' | Report | Donaldson 12' (26); Basham (yellow card) 57'; Donaldson (yellow card) 68'; O'Connell (yellow card) 71' | Stadium: Villa Park; Attendance: 35,210 (2,723 away); Referee: Simon Hooper |

| 26 December 2017 24 | Brentford | 2–1 | Aston Villa | Brentford |
| 17:30 GMT | Sawyers 22'; McEachran (yellow card) 57'; Barbet (yellow card) 57'; Vibe 52' | Report | Onomah 30'; Elphick (yellow card) 68' | Stadium: Griffin Park; Attendance: 11,341 (1,618 away); Referee: Keith Stroud |

| 30 December 2017 25 | Middlesbrough | 0–1 | Aston Villa | Middlesbrough |
| 15:00 GMT | Leadbitter (yellow card) 15'; Friend (yellow card) 67'; Downing (yellow card) 90+4' | Report | Hourihane (yellow card) 24'; Onomah (yellow card) 30'; Elphick (yellow card) 45+4'; Chester (yellow card) 62'; Snodgrass 75' | Stadium: Riverside Stadium; Attendance: 29,422 (2,648 away); Referee: Andy Madley |

| 1 January 2018 26 | Aston Villa | 5–0 | Bristol City | Birmingham |
| 17:30 GMT | Hogan 23'; Snodgrass 34', 60'; Bjarnason 72'; Hourihane 85' | Report | Baker (yellow card) 29' | Stadium: Villa Park; Attendance: 32,604 (2,100 away); Referee: Andy Davies |

| 13 January 2018 27 | Nottingham Forest | 0–1 | Aston Villa | West Bridgford |
| 17:30 GMT | Lichaj (yellow card) 61'; Cash (yellow card) 63' | Report | Hogan 18'; Elmohamady (yellow card) 71'; Terry (yellow card) 89' | Stadium: The City Ground; Attendance: 25,433 (2,004 away); Referee: James Linington |

| 20 January 2018 28 | Aston Villa | 3–1 | Barnsley | Birmingham |
| 15:00 GMT | Hogan 5', 7'; Hourihane 18' | Report | Cavare 41'; Moore (yellow card) 71'; Pinnock (yellow card) 81' | Stadium: Villa Park; Attendance: 31,869 (1,534 away); Referee: Scott Duncan |

| 30 January 2018 29 | Sheffield United | 0–1 | Aston Villa | Sheffield |
| 19:45 GMT | Wilson (yellow card) 71'; Basham (yellow card) 81' | Report | Snodgrass 90' | Stadium: Bramall Lane; Attendance: 26,477 (2,385 away); Referee: Jeremy Simpson |

| 3 February 2018 30 | Aston Villa | 3–2 | Burton Albion | Birmingham |
| 15:00 GMT | Snodgrass (yellow card) 20'; Hogan 33'; Adomah 65'; Grealish (yellow card) 69'; Elmohamady (yellow card) 73'; Grealish 88' | Report | Murphy (yellow card) 71'; Akins (yellow card) 71'; McFadzean (yellow card) 71'; Naylor (yellow card) 71'; Elmohamady 71' (o.g.); Boyce 90+2' | Stadium: Villa Park; Attendance: 33,022 (553 away); Referee: Robert Lewis |

| 11 February 2018 31 | Aston Villa | 2–0 | Birmingham City | Birmingham |
| 12:00 GMT | Adomah 60'; Hourihane 81' | Report | Jenkinson (yellow card) 71'; N'Doye (red card) 90+4'; Dean (yellow card) 71' | Stadium: Villa Park; Attendance: 41,233 (2,100 away); Referee: Peter Bankes |

| 17 February 2018 32 | Fulham | 2–0 | Aston Villa | Fulham |
| 15:00 GMT | Sessegnon 52'; Johansen (yellow card) 67'; Ayité 71' | Report | Jedinak (yellow card) 59' | Stadium: Craven Cottage; Attendance: 24,547 (4,073 away); Referee: Tony Harrington |

| 20 February 2018 33 | Aston Villa | 1–1 | Preston North End | Birmingham |
| 19:45 GMT | Bjarnason (yellow card) 22'; Jedinak (yellow card) 51'; Grabban 65' (pen.); Terry (yellow card) 79' | Report | Fisher (yellow card) 34'; Barkhuizen 65'; Pearson (yellow card) 51'; Rudd (yellow card) 90+5' | Stadium: Villa Park; Attendance: 30,894 (973 away); Referee: Darren England |

| 24 February 2018 34 | Sheffield Wednesday | 2–4 | Aston Villa | Sheffield |
| 15:00 GMT | Clare 14'; Pelupessy (yellow card) 32'; João 45+2'; Boyd (yellow card) 82'; Pudil (yellow card) 90+6' | Report | Grabban 21'; Whelan 67'; Hourihane 87'; Snodgrass 90+3' | Stadium: Hillsborough Stadium; Attendance: 28,604 (4,630 away); Referee: Neil Swarbrick |

| 3 March 2018 | Aston Villa | P–P | Queens Park Rangers | Birmingham |
| 15:00 GMT | | | | Stadium: Villa Park |
Note: Match postponed due to a heavy snowfall. Rescheduled for 13 March at 19:45.

| 6 March 2018 35 | Sunderland | 0–3 | Aston Villa | Sunderland |
| 19:45 GMT | Love (yellow card) 23'; Oviedo (yellow card) 55' | Report | Grabban 34'; Chester (yellow card) 35'; Chester 45+3'; Oviedo og' (66) | Stadium: Stadium of Light; Attendance: 26,081 (1,605 away); Referee: Andy Madley |

| 10 March 2018 36 | Aston Villa | 4–1 | Wolverhampton Wanderers | Birmingham |
| 17:30 GMT | Adomah 8'; Adomah (yellow card) 44'; Chester 57'; Grabban 62'; Hourihane (yellow card) 79'; Grealish (yellow card) 83'; Bjarnason 85' | Report | Jota 20'; Batth (yellow card) 37'; Jota (yellow card) 39'; N'Diaye (yellow card) 55'; Coady (yellow card) 73'; Costa (yellow card) 80' | Stadium: Villa Park; Attendance: 37,836 (2,700 away); Referee: David Coote |

| 13 March 2018 37 | Aston Villa | 1–3 | Queens Park Rangers | Birmingham |
| 19:45 GMT | Chester 88'; Grealish (yellow card) 90+2' | Report | Manning 11'; Bidwell 33'; Lynch (yellow card) 59'; Freeman 82'; Bidwell (yellow card) 90+2' | Stadium: Villa Park; Attendance: 30,228 (462 away); Referee: Tim Robinson |
Note: Rescheduled from 5 March because of heavy snowfall.

| 17 March 2018 38 | Bolton Wanderers | 1–0 | Aston Villa | Horwich |
| 17:30 GMT | Le Fondre 19' | Report | | Stadium: Macron Stadium; Attendance: 19,304 (4,342 away); Referee: Robert Jones |

| 31 March 2018 39 | Hull City | 0–0 | Aston Villa | Kingston upon Hull |
| 17:30 BST | Larsson (yellow card) 56' | Report | Snodgrass (yellow card) 32'; Grabban (yellow card) 81' | Stadium: KCOM Stadium; Attendance: 16,133 (2,221 away); Referee: Andy Davies |

| 3 April 2018 40 | Aston Villa | 3–0 | Reading | Birmingham |
| 19:45 BST | Bjarnason 46' Hourihane 63' Hogan 70' | Report | | Stadium: Villa Park; Attendance: 29,223 (350 away); Referee: Darren Bond |

| 7 April 2018 41 | Norwich City | 3–1 | Aston Villa | Norwich |
| 12:30 BST | Maddison (yellow card) 36' (goal) 72'; Murphy 45+2' (yellow card) 86'; Srbeny 54' (yellow card) 65'; Reed (yellow card) 63' | Report | Grealish 67' (yellow card) 82'; Hourihane (yellow card) 68'; Chester (yellow card) 90+4' | Stadium: Carrow Road; Attendance: 26,278 (2,000 away); Referee: Peter Bankes |

| 10 April 2018 42 | Aston Villa | 1–0 | Cardiff City | Birmingham |
| 19:45 BST | Hourihane (yellow card) 20'; Snodgrass (yellow card) 45'; Grealish 85'; Johnstone (yellow card) 90+4'; Kodjia (yellow card) 90+5' | Report | Paterson (yellow card) 37'; Gunnarsson (yellow card) 78'; Bennett (yellow card) 81'; Ward (yellow card) 89'; Peltier (yellow card) 90+5' | Stadium: Villa Park; Attendance: 32,560 (2,700 away); Referee: Jeremy Simpson |

| 13 April 2018 43 | Aston Villa | 1–0 | Leeds United | Birmingham |
| 19:45 BST | Grabban 29' | Report | | Stadium: Villa Park; Attendance: 33,374 (2,288 away); Referee: Tony Harrington |

| 21 April 2018 44 | Ipswich Town | 0–4 | Aston Villa | Ipswich |
| 15:00 BST | Ward (red card) 42' | Report | Hourihane 25'; Grabban 57'; Grabban 78'; Lansbury 82' | Stadium: Portman Road; Attendance: 20,034 (1,981 away); Referee: Simon Hooper |

| 28 April 2018 45 | Aston Villa | 1–1 | Derby County | Birmingham |
| 15:00 BST | Chester 84' | Report | Jerome 14', (yellow card) 87' | Stadium: Villa Park; Attendance: 41,745 (2,671 away); Referee: Scott Duncan |

| 6 May 2018 46 | Millwall | 1–0 | Aston Villa | Bermondsey |
| 12:30 BST | Williams pen' (30) | Report | | Stadium: The Den; Attendance: 17,195 (2,163 away); Referee: Tim Robinson |

==== Play-offs ====
| 12 May 2018 Semi-final first leg | Middlesbrough | 0–1 | Aston Villa | Middlesbrough |
| 17:15 BST | Friend (yellow card) 45'; Gibson (yellow card) 49' | Report | Hourihane (yellow card) 13'; Jedinak 15'; Snodgrass (yellow card) 75' | Stadium: Riverside Stadium; Attendance: 29,233; Referee: Bobby Madley |

| 15 May 2018 Semi-final second leg | Aston Villa | 0–0 (1–0 agg.) | Middlesbrough | Birmingham |
| 19:45 BST | Snodgrass (yellow card) 34'; Hutton (yellow card) 45'; Grealish (yellow card) 60'; Johnstone (yellow card) 87' | Report | Friend (yellow card) 13'; Bešić (yellow card) 80' | Stadium: Villa Park; Attendance: 40,505; Referee: Mike Dean |

| 26 May 2018 Final | Aston Villa | 0–1 | Fulham | London |
| 17:00 BST | Chester (yellow card) 8'; Grealish (yellow card) 63'; Jedinak (yellow card) 76'; Hutton (yellow card) 86' | Report | Cairney 23'; Odoi (yellow card) 38' (red card) 70'; Kamara (yellow card) 77' | Stadium: Wembley Stadium; Attendance: 85,243; Referee: Anthony Taylor |

=== FA Cup ===
In the FA Cup, Aston Villa entered the competition in the third round and were drawn at home against either Woking or Peterborough United. The latter won their replayed tie 5–2 to visit Villa Park in the third round.

| 6 January 2018 Third round | Aston Villa | 1–3 | Peterborough United | Aston |
| 15:00 GMT | Davis 8' | Report | Marriott 75', 90+3'; Tafazolli 83' | Stadium: Villa Park; Attendance: 21,677; Referee: Robert Jones |

=== EFL Cup ===
On 16 June 2017, the draw for the first round took place with a trip to Colchester United confirmed. Villa were drawn at home to Wigan Athletic in the second round. A third round home time against Middlesbrough was made on 24 August 2017.

| 9 August 2017 First round | Colchester United | 1–2 | Aston Villa | Colchester |
| 19:45 BST | Kent 39'; Murray (yellow card) 76'; Szmodics (yellow card) 87' | Report | Hogan 6'; Kent 21' (o.g.); Green (yellow card) 53'; O'Hare (yellow card) 59' | Stadium: Weston Homes Community Stadium; Attendance: 6,603; Referee: John Brooks |

| 22 August 2017 Second round | Aston Villa | 4–1 | Wigan Athletic | Birmingham |
| 19:45 BST | Hogan 19', 44'; Adomah 36'; O'Hare (yellow card) 68'; Bjarnason 74' | Report | Colclough 43'; Burke (yellow card) 62' | Stadium: Villa Park; Attendance: 18,108; Referee: Darren Drysdale |

| 19 September 2017 Third round | Aston Villa | 0–2 | Middlesbrough | Birmingham |
| 19:45 BST | Elphick (yellow card) 17' (yellow-red card) 57' | Report | Bamford 58' (pen.), 67'; Howson (yellow card) 72' | Stadium: Villa Park; Attendance: 11,197; Referee: Stephen Martin |

== Pre-season friendlies ==
| 12 July 2017 | Kidderminster Harriers | 0–3 | Aston Villa | Kidderminster |
| 19:45 BST | | Report | Hourihane 9'; Chester 30'; McKirdy 82' | Stadium: Aggborough; Attendance: 2,408 |

| 12 July 2017 | AFC Telford United | 0–4 | Aston Villa | Telford |
| 19:45 BST | | Report | Green 38'; Lansbury 49' (pen.), 84' (pen.); Agbonlahor 53' | Stadium: New Bucks Head; Attendance: 1,865; Referee: Blake Antrobus |

| 15 July 2017 | Shrewsbury Town | 2–1 | Aston Villa | Shrewsbury |
| 15:00 BST | Jules 76'; Gnahoua 80' | Report | Lansbury 90+1' (pen.) | Stadium: New Meadow; Attendance: 5,549; Referee: Steve Martin |

| 18 July 2017 | Walsall | 0–0 | Aston Villa | Walsall |
| 19:45 BST | | Report | | Stadium: Banks's Stadium; Attendance: 7,022 |

| 23 July 2017 | Aston Villa | 3–0 | (Germany) MSV Duisburg | Duisburg, Germany |
| 12:00 CEST (45 min match) | Green 21'; Hogan 23', 36' | Report | | Stadium: MSV-Arena; Attendance: 5,913 |

| 23 July 2017 | Aston Villa | 2–0 | (Germany) Hertha BSC | Duisburg, Germany |
| 15:00 CEST (45 min match) | Samba 17'; Agbonlahor 30' | Report | | Stadium: MSV-Arena; Attendance: 5,913 |

| 25 July 2017 | Arminia Bielefeld (Germany) | P–P | Aston Villa | Gütersloh, Germany |
| 19:00 CEST | | | | Stadium: Heidewaldstadion |

| 29 July 2017 | Aston Villa | 0–0 | Watford | Aston |
| 15:00 BST | | Report | | Stadium: Villa Park; Attendance: 10,900; Referee: Oliver Langford |

== Transfers ==
=== Transfers in ===
| Date from | Position | Nationality | Name | From | Fee | Ref. |
|---|---|---|---|---|---|---|
| 3 July 2017 | CB | (England) | John Terry | Chelsea | Free | |
| 19 July 2017 | RB | (Egypt) | Ahmed Elmohamady | Hull City | Undisclosed | |
| 20 July 2017 | CB | (Republic of the Congo) | Christopher Samba | Free agent | Free | |
| 20 July 2017 | DM | (Republic of Ireland) | Glenn Whelan | Stoke City | £2,000,000 | |

=== Transfers out ===
| Date from | Position | Nationality | Name | To | Fee | Ref. |
|---|---|---|---|---|---|---|
| 1 July 2017 | CF | (Czech Republic) | Libor Kozák | Free agent | Released | |
| 1 July 2017 | CB | (England) | Niall Mason | Doncaster Rovers | Undisclosed | |
| 1 July 2017 | DM | (Colombia) | Carlos Sánchez Moreno | Fiorentina | £3,000,000 | |
| 25 July 2017 | CM | (France) | Jordan Veretout | Fiorentina | £7,000,000 | |
| 28 July 2017 | CB | (England) | Nathan Baker | Bristol City | Undisclosed | |
| 13 August 2017 | MF | (Curaçao) | Leandro Bacuna | Reading F.C. | Undisclosed | |

=== Loans in ===
| Start date | Position | Nationality | Name | From | End date | Ref. |
|---|---|---|---|---|---|---|
| 14 July 2017 | GK | (England) | Sam Johnstone | Manchester United | 30 June 2018 | |
| 4 August 2017 | CM | (England) | Josh Onomah | Tottenham Hotspur | 30 June 2018 | |
| 25 August 2017 | RW | (Scotland) | Robert Snodgrass | West Ham United | 30 June 2018 | |
| 25 January 2018 | CB | (England) | Axel Tuanzebe | Manchester United | 30 June 2018 | |
| 31 January 2018 | CF | (England) | Lewis Grabban | Bournemouth | 30 June 2018 | |

=== Loans out ===
| Start date | Position | Nationality | Name | To | End date | Ref. |
|---|---|---|---|---|---|---|
| 16 January 2017 | GK | (Italy) | Pierluigi Gollini | Atalanta | 30 June 2018 | |
| 12 July 2017 | RW | (Spain) | Carles Gil | Deportivo La Coruña | 30 June 2018 | |
| 27 July 2017 | CM | (Democratic Republic of the Congo) | Aaron Tshibola | Milton Keynes Dons | 30 June 2018 | |
| 10 August 2017 | LB | (France) | Jordan Amavi | Marseille | 30 June 2018 | |
| 24 August 2017 | CB | (Republic of Ireland) | Kevin Toner | Stevenage | 30 June 2018 | |
| 31 August 2017 | CM | (England) | Gary Gardner | Barnsley | 30 June 2018 | |
| 31 August 2017 | GK | (Montenegro) | Matija Sarkic | Wigan Athletic | January 2018 | |
| 29 September 2017 | FW | (Scotland) | Ross McCormack | Melbourne City | Injury replacement | |
| 23 January 2018 | RB | (Belgium) | Ritchie De Laet | Royal Antwerp | 30 June | |
| 29 January 2018 | CB | (England) | Tommy Elphick | Reading | 30 June | |
| 31 January 2018 | CB | (England) | Easah Suliman | Grimsby Town | 30 June | |

== Squad statistics ==
=== Appearances and goals ===
Ref:

| No. | Pos | Nat | Player | Total | | Championship | | Play-offs | | FA Cup | | League Cup | |
| No. | Pos | Nat | Player | Apps | Goals | Apps | Goals | Apps | Goals | Apps | Goals | Apps | Goals |
Goalkeepers
| 1 | GK | (England) ENG | Sam Johnstone | 48 | 0 | 45 | 0 | 3 | 0 | 0 | 0 | 0 | 0 |
| 13 | GK | (England) ENG | Jed Steer | 4 | 0 | 0 | 0 | 0 | 0 | 1 | 0 | 3 | 0 |
| 31 | GK | (England) ENG | Mark Bunn | 1 | 0 | 1 | 0 | 0 | 0 | 0 | 0 | 0 | 0 |
Defenders
| 3 | DF | (Wales) WAL | Neil Taylor | 30 | 0 | 27+2 | 0 | 0 | 0 | 1 | 0 | 0 | 0 |
| 4 | DF | (Republic of the Congo) CGO | Christopher Samba | 14 | 1 | 5+7 | 1 | 0 | 0 | 0 | 0 | 2 | 0 |
| 5 | DF | (Wales) WAL | James Chester | 50 | 4 | 46 | 4 | 3 | 0 | 0 | 0 | 1 | 0 |
| 16 | DF | (England) ENG | James Bree | 10 | 0 | 3+3 | 0 | 1 | 0 | 1 | 0 | 2 | 0 |
| 17 | DF | (England) ENG | Micah Richards | 0 | 0 | 0 | 0 | 0 | 0 | 0 | 0 | 0 | 0 |
| 21 | DF | (Scotland) SCO | Alan Hutton | 33 | 0 | 26+3 | 0 | 3 | 0 | 0 | 0 | 1 | 0 |
| 26 | DF | (England) ENG | John Terry | 36 | 1 | 32 | 1 | 3 | 0 | 1 | 0 | 0 | 0 |
| 27 | DF | (Egypt) EGY | Ahmed Elmohamady | 45 | 0 | 36+7 | 0 | 2 | 0 | 0 | 0 | 0 | 0 |
| 28 | DF | (England) ENG | Axel Tuanzebe | 5 | 0 | 4+1 | 0 | 0 | 0 | 0 | 0 | 0 | 0 |
| 35 | DF | (Wales) WAL | Mitchell Clark | 1 | 0 | 0 | 0 | 0 | 0 | 0 | 0 | 1 | 0 |
Midfielders
| 6 | MF | (Republic of Ireland) IRL | Glenn Whelan | 35 | 1 | 30+3 | 1 | 0+2 | 0 | 0 | 0 | 0 | 0 |
| 7 | MF | (Scotland) SCO | Robert Snodgrass | 43 | 7 | 38+2 | 7 | 3 | 0 | 0 | 0 | 0 | 0 |
| 8 | MF | (England) ENG | Henri Lansbury | 12 | 2 | 6+4 | 2 | 0 | 0 | 0+1 | 0 | 1 | 0 |
| 10 | MF | (England) ENG | Jack Grealish | 31 | 3 | 19+8 | 3 | 3 | 0 | 0+1 | 0 | 0 | 0 |
| 14 | MF | (Republic of Ireland) IRL | Conor Hourihane | 46 | 11 | 40+1 | 11 | 3 | 0 | 1 | 0 | 1 | 0 |
| 15 | MF | (Australia) AUS | Mile Jedinak | 28 | 2 | 17+8 | 1 | 3 | 1 | 0 | 0 | 0 | 0 |
| 18 | MF | (England) ENG | Josh Onomah | 37 | 4 | 20+13 | 4 | 0+1 | 0 | 1 | 0 | 2 | 0 |
| 19 | MF | (England) ENG | Andre Green | 7 | 1 | 4+1 | 1 | 0 | 0 | 1 | 0 | 1 | 0 |
| 20 | MF | (Iceland) ISL | Birkir Bjarnason | 29 | 4 | 11+12 | 3 | 0+2 | 0 | 1 | 0 | 3 | 1 |
| 32 | MF | (Republic of Ireland) IRL | Jake Doyle-Hayes | 2 | 0 | 0 | 0 | 0 | 0 | 0 | 0 | 2 | 0 |
| 37 | MF | (Ghana) GHA | Albert Adomah | 44 | 15 | 34+5 | 14 | 3 | 0 | 0 | 0 | 2 | 1 |
| 38 | DF | (Australia) AUS | Jordan Lyden | 2 | 0 | 0 | 0 | 0 | 0 | 0 | 0 | 0+2 | 0 |
Forwards
| 9 | FW | (Republic of Ireland) IRL | Scott Hogan | 41 | 9 | 19+18 | 6 | 0+1 | 0 | 0 | 0 | 3 | 3 |
| 11 | FW | (England) ENG | Gabriel Agbonlahor | 6 | 1 | 2+4 | 1 | 0 | 0 | 0 | 0 | 0 | 0 |
| 22 | FW | (Ivory Coast) CIV | Jonathan Kodjia | 18 | 1 | 9+6 | 1 | 0+3 | 0 | 0 | 0 | 0 | 0 |
| 29 | FW | (England) ENG | Rushian Hepburn-Murphy | 5 | 0 | 0+3 | 0 | 0 | 0 | 0+1 | 0 | 0+1 | 0 |
| 36 | FW | (England) ENG | Callum O'Hare | 8 | 0 | 0+4 | 0 | 0 | 0 | 1 | 0 | 3 | 0 |
| 39 | FW | (England) ENG | Keinan Davis | 30 | 3 | 17+11 | 2 | 0 | 0 | 1 | 1 | 0+1 | 0 |
| 43 | FW | (England) ENG | Corey Blackett-Taylor | 1 | 0 | 0 | 0 | 0 | 0 | 0 | 0 | 0+1 | 0 |
| 45 | FW | (England) ENG | Lewis Grabban | 18 | 8 | 10+5 | 8 | 3 | 0 | 0 | 0 | 0 | 0 |
Players transferred or loaned out during the season
| 25 | MF | (England) ENG | Gary Gardner | 1 | 0 | 0 | 0 | 0 | 0 | 0 | 0 | 1 | 0 |
| 44 | FW | (Scotland) SCO | Ross McCormack | 2 | 0 | 0 | 0 | 0 | 0 | 0 | 0 | 0+2 | 0 |
| 7 | MF | (Curaçao) CUW | Leandro Bacuna | 1 | 0 | 1 | 0 | 0 | 0 | 0 | 0 | 0 | 0 |
| 2 | DF | (Belgium) BEL | Ritchie De Laet | 9 | 0 | 1+4 | 0 | 0 | 0 | 1 | 0 | 2+1 | 0 |
| 24 | DF | (England) ENG | Tommy Elphick | 6 | 0 | 3+1 | 0 | 0 | 0 | 0 | 0 | 2 | 0 |
| 34 | DF | (England) ENG | Easah Suliman | 1 | 0 | 0 | 0 | 0 | 0 | 0 | 0 | 0+1 | 0 |

Last updated: 8 May 2018
Source: Competitions

=== Top scorers ===
As of 17 January 2018

| No. | Pos. | Nat. | Player | Championship | | League Cup | | FA Cup | | Other | | Total | |
| No. | Pos. | Nat. | Player | Goals | Assists | Goals | Assists | Goals | Assists | Goals | Assists | Goals | Assists |
|---|---|---|---|---|---|---|---|---|---|---|---|---|---|
| 37 | MF | ENG | Albert Adomah | 14 | 5 | 1 | 2 | 0 | 0 | 0 | 0 | 15 | 7 |
| 14 | MF | IRE | Conor Hourihane | 11 | 2 | 0 | 0 | 0 | 0 | 0 | 0 | 11 | 2 |
| 9 | FW | IRE | Scott Hogan | 6 | 2 | 3 | 0 | 0 | 0 | 0 | 0 | 9 | 2 |
| 45 | FW | ENG | Lewis Grabban | 8 | 1 | 0 | 0 | 0 | 0 | 0 | 0 | 8 | 0 |
| 7 | MF | SCO | Robert Snodgrass | 7 | 14 | 0 | 0 | 0 | 0 | 0 | 0 | 7 | 14 |
| 18 | MF | ENG | Josh Onomah | 4 | 3 | 0 | 0 | 0 | 0 | 0 | 0 | 4 | 3 |
| 20 | MF | ISL | Birkir Bjarnason | 3 | 2 | 1 | 1 | 0 | 0 | 0 | 0 | 4 | 3 |
| 5 | DF | WAL | James Chester | 4 | 1 | 0 | 0 | 0 | 0 | 0 | 0 | 4 | 1 |
| 10 | MF | ENG | Jack Grealish | 3 | 5 | 0 | 0 | 0 | 0 | 0 | 1 | 3 | 6 |
| 39 | FW | ENG | Keinan Davis | 2 | 1 | 0 | 0 | 1 | 0 | 0 | 0 | 3 | 1 |
| 8 | MF | ENG | Henri Lansbury | 2 | 3 | 0 | 0 | 0 | 0 | 0 | 0 | 2 | 3 |
| 15 | MF | AUS | Mile Jedinak | 1 | 0 | 0 | 0 | 0 | 0 | 1 | 0 | 2 | 0 |
| 22 | FW | CIV | Jonathan Kodjia | 1 | 3 | 0 | 0 | 0 | 0 | 0 | 0 | 1 | 3 |
| 11 | FW | ENG | Gabriel Agbonlahor | 1 | 1 | 0 | 0 | 0 | 0 | 0 | 0 | 1 | 1 |
| 26 | DF | ENG | John Terry | 1 | 1 | 0 | 0 | 0 | 0 | 0 | 0 | 1 | 1 |
| 6 | MF | IRE | Glenn Whelan | 1 | 1 | 0 | 0 | 0 | 0 | 0 | 0 | 1 | 1 |
| 4 | DF | CGO | Christopher Samba | 1 | 0 | 0 | 0 | 0 | 0 | 0 | 0 | 1 | 0 |
| 19 | MF | ENG | Andre Green | 1 | 0 | 0 | 0 | 0 | 0 | 0 | 0 | 1 | 0 |
| 27 | DF | EGY | Ahmed Elmohamady | 0 | 5 | 0 | 0 | 0 | 0 | 0 | 0 | 0 | 5 |
| 21 | DF | SCO | Alan Hutton | 0 | 2 | 0 | 0 | 0 | 0 | 0 | 0 | 0 | 2 |
| 36 | MF | ENG | Callum O'Hare | 0 | 1 | 0 | 0 | 0 | 0 | 0 | 0 | 0 | 1 |
| 2 | DF | BEL | Ritchie De Laet | 0 | 0 | 0 | 1 | 0 | 0 | 0 | 0 | 0 | 1 |
| Total | | | | 71 | 52 | 5 | 4 | 1 | 0 | 1 | 1 | 78 | 57 |

=== Disciplinary record ===
As of 30 September 2017

| Nation | Name | Booked | Sent off (straight red) |
|---|---|---|---|
| (England) | Henri Lansbury | 1 | 1 |
| (Republic of Ireland) | Conor Hourihane | 2 | 0 |
| (Wales) | Neil Taylor | 2 | 1 |
| (Republic of Ireland) | Glenn Whelan | 3 | 0 |
| (England) | Andre Green | 1 | 0 |
| (Scotland) | Alan Hutton | 1 | 0 |
| (Ivory Coast) | Jonathan Kodjia | 1 | 0 |
| (England) | Josh Onomah | 1 | 0 |
| (Scotland) | Robert Snodgrass | 1 | 0 |

==== Suspensions served ====
As of 23 September 2017

| Date | Matches Missed | Player | Reason | Opponents Missed |
|---|---|---|---|---|
| 19 September 2017 | 1 | Tommy Elphick | (yellow card) (yellow-red card) vs Middlesbrough (H) | Nottingham Forest (H) |
