= 2018 EFL Championship play-off final =

Association football match in London

- The match was played at Wembley Stadium.
- Event: 2017–18 EFL Championship
| Aston Villa | Fulham |
| 0 | 1 |
- Date: 26 May 2018
- Venue: Wembley Stadium, London
- Man of the Match: Tom Cairney (Fulham)
- Referee: Anthony Taylor (Cheshire)
- Attendance: 85,243
- Weather: Warm

The 2018 EFL Championship play-off final was an association football match which was played on 26 May 2018 at Wembley Stadium, London, between Aston Villa and Fulham. The match was to determine the third and final team to gain promotion from the EFL Championship, the second tier of English football, to the Premier League. The top two teams of the 2017–18 EFL Championship season gained automatic promotion to the Premier League, while the teams placed from third to sixth place in the table partook in play-off semi-finals; the winners of these semi-finals competed for the final place for the 2018–19 season in the Premier League; Fulham ended the season in third place while Aston Villa finished fourth. Winning the game was estimated to be worth £160 million to the successful team.

The 2018 final, refereed by Anthony Taylor, was watched by a crowd of more than 85,000 people in very warm conditions. Fulham won 1–0, the only goal of the game being scored by the man of the match Tom Cairney in the 23rd minute. It was their first game at Wembley for 43 years since losing the 1975 FA Cup Final and marked their return to the Premier League for the first time since their relegation in the 2013–14 season.

Fulham ended the next season in 19th place and were relegated back to the Championship, despite finishing ten points ahead of bottom club Huddersfield Town. Aston Villa finished fifth in the 2018–19 EFL Championship and secured a 2–1 victory in the play-off final which saw them promoted to the Premier League for the 2019–20 season.

== Route to the final ==
Football League Championship final table, leading positions
| Pos | Team | Pld | W | D | L | GF | GA | GD | Pts |
|---|---|---|---|---|---|---|---|---|---|
| 1 | Wolverhampton Wanderers | 46 | 30 | 9 | 7 | 82 | 39 | +43 | 99 |
| 2 | Cardiff City | 46 | 27 | 9 | 10 | 69 | 39 | +30 | 90 |
| 3 | Fulham | 46 | 25 | 13 | 8 | 79 | 46 | +33 | 88 |
| 4 | Aston Villa | 46 | 24 | 11 | 11 | 72 | 42 | +30 | 83 |
| 5 | Middlesbrough | 46 | 22 | 10 | 14 | 67 | 45 | +22 | 76 |
| 6 | Derby County | 46 | 20 | 15 | 11 | 70 | 48 | +22 | 75 |

Fulham finished the regular 2017–18 season in third place in the EFL Championship, the second tier of the English football league system, one place ahead of Aston Villa. Both therefore missed out on the two automatic places for promotion to the Premier League and instead took part in the play-offs to determine the third promoted team. Fulham finished two points behind Cardiff City (who were promoted in second place) and eleven behind league winners Wolverhampton Wanderers, despite only having lost one game more than the champions. Aston Villa ended the season five points behind Fulham and seven points ahead of fifth-placed Middlesbrough.

Despite dominating possession in the first leg of their semi-final against Derby County, Fulham lost the match with Cameron Jerome scoring the only goal. The second leg once again saw Fulham in control, and with second-half goals from Ryan Sessegnon and Denis Odoi, an aggregate 2–1 victory ensured the London club qualify for the playoff final.

Aston Villa won the first of their semi-final matches against Middlesbrough at the Riverside Stadium with a score of 1–0. A first-half header from Mile Jedinak secured the victory in a game of few chances. A goalless draw in the return leg at the Villa Park meant Villa won the play-off semi-finals 1–0 on aggregate to qualify for the final. Tony Pulis, the Middlesbrough manager, was disappointed that Villa goalkeeper Sam Johnstone was not sent off for handling the ball outside the box with two minutes of the match remaining. Middlesbrough were also denied a last-minute goal which would have taken the tie into extra time when Stewart Downing's direct free kick struck the bar.

| Aston Villa | | | Round | Fulham |
|---|---|---|---|---|---|---|
| Opponent | Result | Legs | Semi-finals | Opponent | Result | Legs |
| Middlesbrough | 1–0 | 1–0 away; 0–0 home | | Derby County | 2–1 | 0–1 away; 2–0 home |

== Match ==
=== Background ===
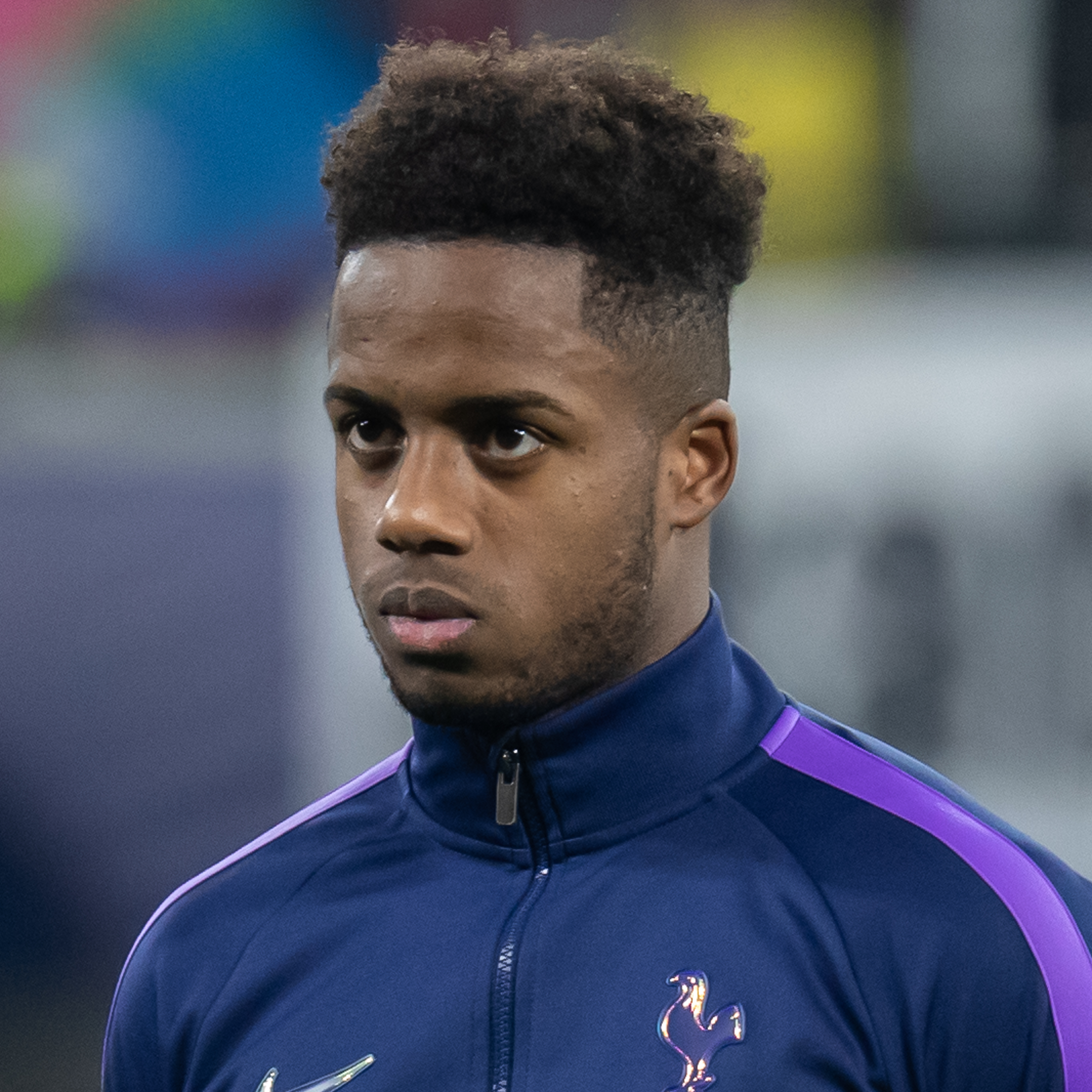
Ryan Sessegnon (pictured in 2020) was Fulham's top scorer and appeared in every league match during the 2017–18 Championship season.

This was Aston Villa's first play-off final, having been relegated from the Premier League at the end of the 2015–16 season, and finishing the following season in 13th position. Villa's last visit to Wembley ended in defeat a 4–0 defeat to Arsenal in the 2015 FA Cup Final. Fulham had failed to win seven consecutive play-off semi-final matches, most recently losing out to Reading in the 2017 play-offs. Qualification for the final marked Fulham's first visit to Wembley since their defeat against West Ham United in the 1975 FA Cup Final. During the regular season, Fulham had lost to Villa at Villa Park 2–1 in October 2017, despite dominating possession, but won the reverse fixture at Craven Cottage in February 2018. Ryan Sessegnon was ever-present and top scorer for Fulham with 16 goals, while Albert Adomah had scored the most during Aston Villa's regular season, with 14 goals from 41 appearances.

The game was considered a "classic clash of styles" by the Bleacher Report, pitching an "experienced and pragmatic" Villa against a Fulham team "featuring ample young talent". Villa's starting line-up had all played in a Wembley final before, and included 37-year-old former England international defender John Terry. Only two of the Fulham team had played at England's national stadium, Matt Targett, for Southampton and Stefan Johansen, for Norway. The Fulham starting line-up was unchanged from their semi-final aggregate win. Ahmed Elmohamady returned to the Aston Villa starting eleven having missed out on the second leg of the semi-finals with a hamstring injury picked up at the end of the first leg, replacing James Bree who sat on the bench.

The final was refereed by Anthony Taylor from the Cheshire Football Association, with assistant referees Gary Beswick and Dan Cook, and Kevin Friend acted as the fourth official. It was widely reported that the game was worth at least £160 million over three years to the winners through sponsorship and television deals. Before kick-off, both teams were introduced to former Fulham player Alan Mullery. Prince William, Duke of Cambridge, an Aston Villa fan, was supporting from the stands. Fulham were considered favourites to win the match, which was broadcast live in the UK on Sky Sports Main Event and on ESPN+ in the United States.

=== First half ===
Fulham's Aleksandar Mitrović kicked off at 5 p.m. in front of a crowd of 85,243 people, in warm conditions. Neither team dominated the early stages, and in the 8th minute, Villa's James Chester was booked for a foul on Mitrović. After 15 minutes, the pitchside temperature was measured at 90 °F (32 °C). Fulham continued to pass the ball around and on 20 minutes, Aboubakar Kamara's looping shot landed on the roof of the Villa net. Soon after, Chester was forced to make a clearance as Fulham began to take control of the match. In the 23rd minute, they made their superiority count and took the lead through a Tom Cairney strike. Sessegnon evaded a challenge from Hourihane 30 yards (27 m) from the Villa goal, and advanced, playing an accurately weighted pass to Cairney who passed the ball into the net past Sam Johnstone. Half an hour in, Villa claims for a red card were denied by the referee Anthony Taylor for Ryan Fredericks who appeared to deliberately stamp on Grealish. Although Villa briefly dominated the game, Fulham were soon back on top although another foul on Grealish, this time from Denis Odoi, earned the London club their second yellow card of the afternoon. With five minutes of the half remaining, Robert Snodgrass' chipped a pass to Grealish who controlled the ball, only to strike it over the Fulham bar. In the 42nd minute, a mix-up between Chester and Johnstone allowed Mitrović in on an empty goal, only for Chester to redeem himself with a clearance. Two minutes of additional time were played before the half ended 1–0 to Fulham.

=== Second half ===
Aston Villa kicked off the second half and quickly both Grealish and Lewis Grabban pressed higher up the pitch, putting pressure on Fulham goalkeeper Marcus Bettinelli. In the 50th minute, a cross from Adomah was met by Snodgrass, but his header was high over the bar. Three minutes later, Grealish's header from another Adomah cross was charged down by Bettinelli. Midway through the second half, a snaking run from Grealish saw him pass three Fulham defenders but his shot was saved. He was then shown a yellow card for a poor challenge on Cairney. Kevin McDonald's shot on 67 minutes was deflected out but the subsequent corner was headed wide. In the 70th minute, Odoi was sent off after receiving a second yellow card for kicking Grealish in the chest, leaving Fulham to defend their lead with ten men for the remaining 20 minutes of the match. Fulham's struggling midfielder Johansen was substituted off in the 72nd minute, to be replaced by Oliver Norwood. Soon after Mitrović missed an opportunity to double Fulham's advantage, shooting high and wide of the Villa goal. Jedinak was then booked for a foul on Mitrović before Kamara also received a yellow card after time-wasting as he was substituted for Tomáš Kalas. A minute later, Steve Bruce made two attacking substitutions for Villa, bringing on Jonathan Kodjia for Elmohamady and Josh Onomah for Jedinak. Scott Hogan was then brought on for Hourihane who was struggling with injury, and Fredericks was replaced by Cyrus Christie for Fulham. With less than five minutes of the match remaining, Alan Hutton was booked for a bad challenge on Mitrović. A late free kick for Snodgrass which he struck wide was followed by the announcement of five minutes of additional time. Hogan missed a chance for Villa before a possible Grealish penalty was waved away by the referee. A Sessegnon free kick was cleared and Villa attacked but with no end product, and the match ended in a 1–0 victory for Fulham.

=== Details ===
26 May 2018
17:00 BST

| Aston Villa | 0–1 | Fulham |
|---|---|---|
| | Report | Cairney 23' |

Wembley Stadium, London
Attendance: 85,243
Referee: Anthony Taylor

| Aston Villa | Fulham |

| GK | 1 | (England) Sam Johnstone |
| RB | 27 | (Egypt) Ahmed Elmohamady | | (substituted off) 77' |
| CB | 5 | (Wales) James Chester | (yellow card) 8' |
| CB | 26 | (England) John Terry (c) |
| LB | 21 | (Scotland) Alan Hutton | (yellow card) 86' |
| DM | 15 | (Australia) Mile Jedinak | (yellow card) 76' | (substituted off) 77' |
| CM | 10 | (England) Jack Grealish | (yellow card) 63' |
| CM | 14 | (Republic of Ireland) Conor Hourihane | | (substituted off) 82' |
| RW | 7 | (Scotland) Robert Snodgrass |
| LW | 37 | (Ghana) Albert Adomah |
| CF | 45 | (England) Lewis Grabban |
Substitutes:
| GK | 31 | (England) Mark Bunn |
| DF | 16 | (England) James Bree |
| MF | 6 | (Republic of Ireland) Glenn Whelan |
| MF | 18 | (England) Josh Onomah | | (substituted on) 77' |
| MF | 20 | (Iceland) Birkir Bjarnason |
| FW | 9 | (Republic of Ireland) Scott Hogan | | (substituted on) 82' |
| FW | 22 | (Ivory Coast) Jonathan Kodjia | | (substituted on) 77' |
Manager:
(England) Steve Bruce

| GK | 1 | (England) Marcus Bettinelli |
| RB | 2 | (England) Ryan Fredericks | | (substituted off) 83' |
| CB | 4 | (Belgium) Denis Odoi | (yellow card) 38' (yellow-red card) 70' |
| CB | 13 | (United States) Tim Ream |
| LB | 21 | (England) Matt Targett |
| CM | 6 | (Scotland) Kevin McDonald |
| CM | 8 | (Norway) Stefan Johansen | | (substituted off) 72' |
| CM | 10 | (Scotland) Tom Cairney (c) |
| RW | 47 | (France) Aboubakar Kamara | (yellow card) 77' | (substituted off) 77' |
| LW | 3 | (England) Ryan Sessegnon |
| CF | 32 | (Serbia) Aleksandar Mitrović |
Substitutes:
| GK | 27 | (England) David Button |
| DF | 22 | (Republic of Ireland) Cyrus Christie | | (substituted on) 83' |
| DF | 26 | (Czech Republic) Tomáš Kalas | | (substituted on) 77' |
| MF | 11 | (Togo) Floyd Ayité |
| MF | 16 | (Northern Ireland) Oliver Norwood | | (substituted on) 72' |
| FW | 9 | (Portugal) Rui Fonte |
| FW | 20 | (Brazil) Lucas Piazon |
Manager:
(Serbia) Slaviša Jokanović

Man of the Match:
Tom Cairney (Fulham)

Statistics
| | Aston Villa | Fulham |
|---|---|---|
| Goals scored | 0 | 1 |
| Shots on target | 2 | 3 |
| Shots off target | 10 | 12 |
| Fouls committed | 14 | 15 |
| Corner kicks | 0 | 3 |
| Yellow cards | 1 | 4 |
| Red cards | 0 | 1 |

== Post-match ==
Aston Villa manager Steve Bruce was unhappy in particular that Fredericks had escaped any kind of punishment for his challenge on Grealish, stating: "First half we didn't do enough. But a big decision then went against us. The red card was very early and I know we don't want to see a game ruined early, but I was right in front of the incident – he stamps on him." Slaviša Jokanović, the Fulham head coach, said "It was a really important victory for us and we deserved it. It's not easy to play with lots of pressure, with lots of young players, and on the other side lots of experience". Tom Cairney was named the man of the match.

Fulham ended the next season, their first in the Premier League since they were relegated in the 2013–14 campaign, in 19th place and were relegated back to the Championship. Despite finishing ten points ahead of bottom club Huddersfield Town, Fulham concluded the season ten points from safety having conceded 81 goals, the most in the league. Aston Villa finished fifth in the 2018–19 EFL Championship and secured a 2–1 victory in the play-off final which saw them promoted to the Premier League for the 2019–20 season.
