= 2016–17 Aston Villa F.C. season =

English football club season

Aston Villa
2016–17 season
- Chairman: Tony Xia
- Manager: Roberto Di Matteo (until 3 October); Steve Bruce (from 12 October)
- Stadium: Villa Park
- Championship: 13th
- FA Cup: Third round
- League Cup: First round
- Top goalscorer: League: Jonathan Kodjia (19); All: Jonathan Kodjia (19)
- Average home league attendance: 32,107 (2,137 at VP)
Home colours	Away colours

Second City Derby
- 56--37--31

The 2016-17 season was Aston Villa's 1st season in the Football League Championship following their relegation from the Premier League last season. The 2016–17 EFL Championship season was Villa's 142nd season in English football. It was the club's first season in the second tier of English football since the formation of the Premier League.

On 2 June 2016, Roberto Di Matteo was appointed the manager of the newly relegated Championship club, working under the new chairman Tony Xia. Di Matteo's former Chelsea teammate Steve Clarke was appointed as his assistant on the same day. Xia also appointed Keith Wyness as CEO. On 3 October 2016, Di Matteo was sacked as manager after a string of poor results culminating in a 2–0 defeat at Preston North End.

On 12 October 2016, Steve Bruce was appointed manager. In his second match in charge, Villa defeated Reading, the club's first win in 11 games and the first away win for 14 months. Bruce brought in Colin Calderwood as assistant manager from Brighton & Hove Albion and Stephen Clemence from old club Hull City as first-team coach.

== Competitions ==
=== Football League Championship ===
==== League table ====
Pos	Team	Pld	W	D	L	GF	GA	GD	Pts
11	Preston North End	46	16	14	16	64	63	+1	62
12	Cardiff City	46	17	11	18	60	61	−1	62
13	Aston Villa	46	16	14	16	47	48	−1	62
14	Barnsley	46	15	13	18	64	67	−3	58
15	Wolverhampton Wanderers	46	16	10	20	54	58	−4	58

Source: English Football League, Soccerway
Rules for classification: 1) Points; 2) Goal difference; 3) Number of goals scored; 4) Points in head-to-head matches; 5) Goal difference in head-to-head matches; 6) Goals scored in head-to-head matches; 7) Play-off.

==== Results summary ====
Overall								Home						Away					
Pld	W	D	L	GF	GA	GD	Pts	W	D	L	GF	GA	GD	W	D	L	GF	GA	GD
46	16	14	16	47	48	−1	62	12	8	3	33	20	+13	4	6	13	14	28	−14

Last updated: 7 May 2017.
Source: Football League Championship

==== Results by matchday ====
Matchday	1	2	3	4	5	6	7	8	9	10	11	12	13	14	15	16	17	18	19	20	21	22	23	24	25	26	27	28	29	30	31	32	33	34	35	36	37	38	39	40	41	42	43	44	45	46
Ground	A	H	H	A	A	H	H	A	H	A	A	H	A	H	A	H	A	H	A	H	A	A	H	H	A	A	H	A	A	H	H	A	H	H	A	A	H	A	H	H	A	H	A	H	A	H
Result	L	W	D	D	L	D	D	D	D	D	L	D	W	W	D	W	D	W	L	W	L	W	W	D	L	L	D	L	L	L	L	L	W	W	W	L	W	W	W	W	D	L	L	W	L	D
Position	19	11	11	12	16	17	17	18	17	17	19	20	18	16	15	14	13	11	15	13	15	13	10	9	12	13	13	14	14	16	16	17	17	15	13	15	13	13	11	11	11	12	12	12	12	13

Updated to match(es) played on 7 May 2017. Source: Statto.com
A = Away; H = Home; W = Win; D = Draw; L = Loss

==== Matches ====
Win Draw Loss

On 22 June 2016, the fixtures for the forthcoming season were announced.

7 August 2016 1	Sheffield Wednesday	1–0	Aston Villa	Sheffield
16:30 BST	Hutchinson (yellow card) 30'; Wallace (yellow card) 44'; Lees (yellow card) 45+3'; Forestieri 86'	Report	Elphick (yellow card) 41'; Gardner (yellow card) 45+4'; Baker (yellow card) 66'	Stadium: Hillsborough Stadium; Attendance: 30,060 (4,494 away); Referee: Steve Martin
Note: Live on Sky Sports

13 August 2016 2	Aston Villa	3–0	Rotherham United	Birmingham
15:00 BST	Gestede 21', 45+4', (yellow card) 38'; Ayew (yellow card) 27'; McCormack (yellow card) 36'; Grealish 84', (yellow card) 84'	Report	Mattock (yellow card) 54'; Fisher (yellow card) 82'	Stadium: Villa Park; Attendance: 33,286 (2,317 away); Referee: Keith Stroud

16 August 2016 3	Aston Villa	1–1	Huddersfield Town	Birmingham
19:45 BST	McCormack 25'; Tshibola (yellow card) 54'; Elphick (yellow card) 68'; Bacuna (yellow card) 75'	Report	Hudson (yellow card) 43'; Hefele 86'	Stadium: Villa Park; Attendance: 34,924 (2,678 away); Referee: Scott Duncan

20 August 2016 4	Derby County	0–0	Aston Villa	Derby
17:30 BST	Hughes (yellow card) 57'; Keogh (yellow card) 59'; Bryson (yellow card) 60'	Report	Bacuna (yellow card) 47'; McCormack (yellow card) 60'; Cissokho (yellow card) 73'	Stadium: Pride Park Stadium; Attendance: 31,205 (3,070 away); Referee: Paul Tierney
Note: Live on Sky Sports

27 August 2016 5	Bristol City	3–1	Aston Villa	Bristol
15:00 BST	Byran (yellow card) 31', (goal) 61'; Abraham 59'; Tomlin 81'	Report	Grealish 5', (yellow card) 89'; Ayew (yellow card) 56'; Chester (yellow card) 57'; De Laet (yellow card) 69'; Elphick (yellow card) 74'; Jedinak (yellow card) 76'; Bacuna (yellow card) 90+3'	Stadium: Ashton Gate Stadium; Attendance: 21,099 (2,551 away); Referee: James Linington

11 September 2016 6	Aston Villa	2–2	Nottingham Forest	Birmingham
13:15 BST	McCormack 72'; Gestede 74'; Cissokho (yellow card) 86'; Elphick (yellow card) 90'; Ayew (yellow card) 90+3'	Report	Kasami (yellow card) 17'; Vellios 57', (yellow card) 70'; Fox (yellow card) 66'; Lansbury (yellow card) 77', (goal) 87'; Pereira (yellow card) 87' (yellow-red card) 88'; Perquis (yellow card) 90'	Stadium: Villa Park; Attendance: 30,619 (2,869 away); Referee: Simon Hooper
Note: Live on Sky Sports

14 September 2016 7	Aston Villa	1–1	Brentford	Birmingham
19:45 BST	Kodjia 19'; Bacuna (yellow card) 86'; Jedinak (yellow card) 90+3'	Report	Colin (yellow card) 41'; Woods (yellow card) 70'; Egan 88'	Stadium: Villa Park; Attendance: 29,752 (1,836 away); Referee: Jeremy Simpson

17 September 2016 8	Ipswich Town	0–0	Aston Villa	Ipswich
15:00 BST	Lawrence (yellow card) 52'	Report	Kodjia (yellow card) 74'	Stadium: Portman Road; Attendance: 19,249 (1,882 away); Referee: Tony Harrington

24 September 2016 9	Aston Villa	1–1	Newcastle United	Birmingham
17:30 BST	Chester (yellow card) 41'; Baker (yellow card) 44'; Tshibola (yellow card) 79', (goal) 88'	Report	Shelvey (yellow card) 27'; Elphick 28' (o.g.)	Stadium: Villa Park; Attendance: 32,062 (2,788 away); Referee: Christopher Kavanagh
Note: Live on Sky Sports

27 September 2016 10	Barnsley	1–1	Aston Villa	Barnsley
19:45 BST	Kpekawa (yellow card) 31'; Morsy (yellow card) 34'; MacDonald (yellow card) 64'; Yiadom (yellow card) 80'; Winnall 90'	Report	Bacuna (yellow card) 53'; Ayew 61'; Jedinak (yellow card) 63'; Tshibola (yellow card) 68'	Stadium: Oakwell Stadium; Attendance: 15,830 (3,737 away); Referee: James Adcock

1 October 2016 11	Preston North End	2–0	Aston Villa	Preston, Lancashire
15:00 BST	Pearson 5', (yellow card) 44'; Hugill 39'; Cunningham (yellow card) 61'; Welsh (yellow card) 87'; Wright (yellow card) 90'	Report	Hutton (yellow card) 42'; Westwood (yellow card) 44'; Jedinak (yellow card) 45'; Amavi (yellow card) 85'	Stadium: Deepdale; Attendance: 17,696 (5,421 away)

15 October 2016 12	Aston Villa	1–1	Wolverhampton Wanderers	Birmingham
17:30 BST	Kodjia 15' (pen.), (yellow card) 19'; McCormack (yellow card) 40'; Chester (yellow card) 49'	Report	Costa 34' (pen.); Coady (yellow card) 40'; Iorfa (yellow card) 45+5'; Edwards (yellow card) 86'	Stadium: Villa Park; Attendance: 32,533 (2,800 away); Referee: David Coote
Note: Aston Villa's Jack Grealish was suspended for 3 matches after the FA charged him with violent conduct. Live on Sky Sports

18 October 2016 13	Reading	1–2	Aston Villa	Reading
20:00 BST	Kermorgant 54'; Hutton (yellow card) 78'; McCleary (yellow card) 90+3'	Report	Kodjia 38'; Ayew 90' (pen.)	Stadium: Madejski Stadium; Attendance: 20,331 (4,030 away); Referee: Andy Woolmer

22 October 2016 14	Aston Villa	1–0	Fulham	Birmingham
15:00 BST	Kodjia 80'	Report	Piazon (yellow card) 45'; McDonald (yellow card) 72'; Martin (yellow card) 83'; Madl (yellow card) 90'	Stadium: Villa Park; Attendance: 32,201 (1,211 away); Referee: Andrew Madley

30 October 2016 15	Birmingham City	1–1	Aston Villa	Birmingham
12:00 GMT	Kieftenbeld (yellow card) 28'; Davis 71', (yellow card) 72'	Report	Amavi (yellow card) 3'; Gardner 29'; Westwood (yellow card) 55'; Ayew (yellow card) 63'	Stadium: St Andrew's; Attendance: 29,656 (1,988 away); Referee: Mike Dean
Note: Live on Sky Sports

5 November 2016 16	Aston Villa	2–1	Blackburn Rovers	Birmingham
15:00 GMT	Baker (yellow card) 24'; Kodjia 58' (pen.), 70'; McCormack (yellow card) 62'	Report	Gallagher 54'; Guthrie (yellow card) 66'; Akpan (yellow card) 86'	Stadium: Villa Park; Attendance: 29,712 (836 away); Referee: Roger East

18 November 2016 17	Brighton & Hove Albion	1–1	Aston Villa	Falmer, Brighton and Hove
19:45 GMT	Murray 45'; Dunk (yellow card) 90+1'	Report	Baker 20'; Westwood (yellow card) 58'	Stadium: Falmer Stadium; Attendance: 30,107 (3,258 away); Referee: Steve Martin

26 November 2016 18	Aston Villa	3–1	Cardiff City	Birmingham
15:00 GMT	Adomah 24'; Kodjia 39'; Amavi (yellow card) 59'; Agbonlahor (yellow card) 65'; Gestede (yellow card) 86', (goal) 90' (pen.)	Report	Lambert (yellow card) 17', (goal) 28'; Pilkington (yellow card) 34'; Peltier (yellow card) 71' (yellow-red card) 84'; Gunnarsson (yellow card) 78'; Morrison (yellow card) 89'	Stadium: Villa Park; Attendance: 31,484 (2,670 away); Referee: Geoff Eltringham

3 December 2016 19	Leeds United	2–0	Aston Villa	Leeds
17:30 GMT	Phillips (yellow card) 40'; Roofe 68'; Jansson (yellow card) 76'; Wood 90+4'	Report	Jedinak (yellow card) 15'; Ayew (yellow card) 90'; Grealish (yellow card) 90'	Stadium: Elland Road; Attendance: 32,648 (2,773 away); Referee: Peter Bankes

10 December 2016 20	Aston Villa	1–0	Wigan Athletic	Birmingham
15:00 GMT	Hutton (yellow card) 83'; Grealish (yellow card) 86' (goal) 88'	Report	Garbutt (yellow card) 12'; Gómez (yellow card) 64'; Perkins (yellow card) 79'; MacDonald (yellow card) 90+3'	Stadium: Villa Park; Attendance: 29,392 (1,255 away); Referee: James Linington

13 December 2016 21	Norwich City	1–0	Aston Villa	Norwich
19:45 GMT	Brady (yellow card) 26'; Oliveira 62'	Report		Stadium: Carrow Road; Attendance: 26,044 (2,003 away); Referee: Tim Robinson

18 December 2016 22	Queens Park Rangers	0–1	Aston Villa	Shepherd's Bush
12:00 GMT	Luongo (yellow card) 81'	Report	Jedinak (yellow card) 43'; Chester (yellow card) 63'; Kodjia 75'; Bunn (yellow card) 90+3'	Stadium: Loftus Road; Attendance: 16,285 (3,228 away); Referee: Geoff Eltringham

26 December 2016 23	Aston Villa	2–1	Burton Albion	Birmingham
15:00 GMT	Bacuna 15'; McCormack 78'	Report	Ward 31', (yellow card) 63'; Mousinho (yellow card) 62'	Stadium: Villa Park; Attendance: 41,337 (2,573 away); Referee: Steve Martin

29 December 2016 24	Aston Villa	1–1	Leeds United	Birmingham
19:45 GMT	Kodjia 86' (pen.); Gestede (yellow card) 86'; Bacuna (yellow card) 87'; Chester (yellow card) 90+2'	Report	Jansson 54', (yellow card) 86'; Bridcutt (yellow card) 59'; Cooper (yellow card) 85'	Stadium: Villa Park; Attendance: 37,078 (2,818 away); Referee: Roger East

2 January 2017 25	Cardiff City	1–0	Aston Villa	Cardiff
15:00 GMT	Ralls 16', (yellow card) 27'; Gunnarsson (yellow card) 57'; Bamba (yellow card) 64'; Peltier (yellow card) 74'	Report	Chester (yellow card) 41'; Grealish (yellow card) 60'; Bacuna (yellow card) 78'; Hutton (yellow card) 85'	Stadium: Cardiff City Stadium; Attendance: 21,391 (3,258 away); Referee: Andy Davies

14 January 2017 26	Wolverhampton Wanderers	1–0	Aston Villa	Wolverhampton
15:00 GMT	Mason 15'	Report	Bacuna (yellow card) 43'	Stadium: Molineux; Attendance: 27,255 (4,195 away); Referee: Tony Harrington

21 January 2017 27	Aston Villa	2–2	Preston North End	Birmingham
15:00 GMT	Adomah 22', 36' (pen.), (yellow card) 41'; Amavi (yellow card) 67'	Report	Browne (yellow card) 18'; Hugill (yellow card) 63', (goal) 64', 76'; Vermijl (yellow card) 68'; McGeady (yellow card) 90+5'	Stadium: Villa Park; Attendance: 32,415 (2,709 away); Referee: Andrew Madley

31 January 2017 28	Brentford	3–0	Aston Villa	Brentford, London
19:45 GMT	Vibe 25', 65'; Yennaris (yellow card) 33', (goal) 38'	Report	Hourihane (yellow card) 74'	Stadium: Griffin Park; Attendance: 10,016 (1,624 away); Referee: David Coote

4 February 2017 29	Nottingham Forest	2–1	Aston Villa	Nottingham
17:30 GMT	Cash (yellow card) 39'; Assombalonga 42'; Brereton 90+3'	Report	Kodjia 19'; Hogan (yellow card) 45+1'; Grealish (yellow card) 39' (yellow-red card) 78'	Stadium: City Ground; Attendance: 19,866 (1,946 away); Referee: Paul Tierney

11 February 2017 30	Aston Villa	0–1	Ipswich Town	Birmingham
15:00 GMT		Report	Knudsen (yellow card) 76'; Diagouraga (yellow card) 79'; Huws 83'	Stadium: Villa Park; Attendance: 30,796 (1,802 away); Referee: Tim Robinson

14 February 2017 31	Aston Villa	1–3	Barnsley	Birmingham
19:45 GMT	Kodjia 44'	Report	Armstrong 25' (pen.); Watkins (yellow card) 30'; Bradshaw 43', 58'; Kent (yellow card) 60'	Stadium: Villa Park; Attendance: 26,435 (1,633 away); Referee: Geoff Eltringham

20 February 2017 32	Newcastle United	2–0	Aston Villa	Newcastle upon Tyne
20:00 GMT	Shelvey (yellow card) 34'; Lascelles (yellow card) 38'; Gouffran 42'; Lansbury 59' (o.g.)	Report		Stadium: St James' Park; Attendance: 50,024 (1,770 away); Referee: Peter Bankes

25 February 2017 33	Aston Villa	1–0	Derby County	Birmingham
15:00 GMT	Chester 25'; Taylor (yellow card) 79'; Bacuna (red card) 90+3'	Report	Ince (yellow card) 44'; Christie (yellow card) 80'	Stadium: Villa Park; Attendance: 30,935 (2,414 away); Referee: Andrew Madley

28 February 2017 34	Aston Villa	2–0	Bristol City	Birmingham
19:45 GMT	Hutton (yellow card) 43'; Kodjia 54'; Hourihane 59'; Green (yellow card) 82'	Report	Smith (yellow card) 16'; Giefer (yellow card) 19'; Reid (yellow card) 39'; Wright (yellow card) 68'; Bryan (yellow card) 86'	Stadium: Villa Park; Attendance: 28,119 (2,473 away); Referee: Simon Hooper

4 March 2017 35	Rotherham United	0–2	Aston Villa	Rotherham
15:00 GMT	Frecklington (yellow card) 49'; Belaïd (yellow card) 62'	Report	Vaulks 68' (o.g.); Kodjia 87'	Stadium: New York Stadium; Attendance: 10,720 (2,567 away); Referee: Stephen Martin

7 March 2017 36	Huddersfield Town	1–0	Aston Villa	Huddersfield
19:45 GMT	Löwe (yellow card) 26'; Mooy (yellow card) 67'; Smith 69'; Quaner (yellow card) 87'	Report	Jedinak (yellow card) 29'; Taylor (yellow card) 64'; Baker (yellow card) 83'; Kodjia (yellow card) 85'	Stadium: The John Smith's Stadium; Attendance: 20,584 (2,000 away); Referee: Darren Bond

11 March 2017 37	Aston Villa	2–0	Sheffield Wednesday	Birmingham
15:00 GMT	Baker (yellow card) 5'; Amavi (yellow card) 32'; Kodjia 34', 79'; Hourihane (yellow card) 76'	Report	Loovens (yellow card) 18'; Sasso (red card) 48'	Stadium: Villa Park; Attendance: 31,143 (2,764 away); Referee: Lee Probert

18 March 2017 38	Wigan Athletic	0–2	Aston Villa	Wigan
15:00 GMT	Hanson (yellow card) 23'	Report	Hourihane (yellow card) 42'; Chester 73'; Lansbury (yellow card) 75'; Hogan 84'	Stadium: DW Stadium; Attendance: 14,811 (4,781 away); Referee: Tony Harrington

1 April 2017 39	Aston Villa	2–0	Norwich City	Birmingham
15:00 BST	Kodjia 25', 87'; Lansbury (yellow card) 51'	Report	Pinto (yellow card) 65' (yellow-red card) 80'	Stadium: Villa Park; Attendance: 32,605 (2,384 away); Referee: Jeremy Simpson

4 April 2017 40	Aston Villa	1–0	Queens Park Rangers	Birmingham
19:45 BST	Kodjia 5', (yellow card) 87'	Report	Mackie (yellow card) 24'	Stadium: Villa Park; Attendance: 27,154 (802 away); Referee: Peter Bankes

8 April 2017 41	Burton Albion	1–1	Aston Villa	Burton upon Trent
15:00 BST	Irvine (yellow card) 48'; Dyer 61', (yellow card) 62'; Murphy (yellow card) 72'	Report	Kodjia 3'; Jedinak (yellow card) 64'	Stadium: Pirelli Stadium; Attendance: 6,716 (1,580 away); Referee: Lee Probert

15 April 2017 42	Aston Villa	1–3	Reading	Birmingham
15:00 BST	Chester 14'; Bacuna (yellow card) 78'	Report	Mendes 6', 46'; Williams (yellow card) 16'; Obita (yellow card) 66'; Grabban 79' (pen.); Swift (yellow card) 86'	Stadium: Villa Park; Attendance: 30,742 (2,465 away); Referee: Stuart Duncan

17 April 2017 43	Fulham	3–1	Aston Villa	Fulham, London
14:45 BST	Sessegnon 17'; Aluko 56'; Kebano 79'	Report	Kodjia (red card) 22'; Amavi (yellow card) 26'; Grealish 50'; Gardner (yellow card) 55'; Hogan (yellow card) 58'	Stadium: Craven Cottage; Attendance: 23,891 (3,849 away); Referee: David Coote

23 April 2017 44	Aston Villa	1–0	Birmingham City	Birmingham
12:00 BST	Agbonlahor (yellow card) 62', (goal) 68'	Report	Shotton (yellow card) 62'; Robinson (yellow card) 90+2'	Stadium: Villa Park; Attendance: 40,884 (2,000 away); Referee: Simon Hooper

29 April 2017 45	Blackburn Rovers	1–0	Aston Villa	Blackburn
15:00 BST	Graham 54'	Report		Stadium: Ewood Park; Attendance: 21,884 (6,385 away); Referee: Geoff Eltringham

7 May 2017 46	Aston Villa	1–1	Brighton & Hove Albion	Birmingham
12:00 BST	Baker (red card) 63'; Grealish 89'	Report	Murray 64' (pen.); Pocognoli (yellow card) 90+2'	Stadium: Villa Park; Attendance: 32,856 (2,865 away); Referee: Darren Bond

=== FA Cup ===
Win Draw Loss

8 January 2017 Third round	Tottenham Hotspur	2–0	Aston Villa	Tottenham, London
16:00 GMT	Davies 71'; Son 80'	Report		Stadium: White Hart Lane; Attendance: 31,182; Referee: Mike Dean

=== EFL Cup ===
Win Draw Loss

10 August 2016 First round	Luton Town	3–1	Aston Villa	Luton
19:45 BST	Gray 35'; McGeehan 53'; Okore 66' (o.g.); Lee (yellow card) 80'; Hylton (yellow card) 90'	Report	Ayew 13', (yellow card) 43'; McCormack (yellow card) 17'	Stadium: Kenilworth Road; Attendance: 7,412; Referee: Gavin Ward
Note: Live on Sky Sports

== Transfers ==
=== Transfers in ===
First Team
Date	Position	No.	Player	From club	Transfer fee
20 June 2016	DF	6	(England) Tommy Elphick (41)	(England) AFC Bournemouth	£3m
8 July 2016	GK	1	(Italy) Pierluigi Gollini (20)	(Italy) Hellas Verona	£4.1m
10 July 2016	MF	8	(England) Aaron Tshibola (8)	(England) Reading	£5m
4 August 2016	FW	44	(Scotland) Ross McCormack (20)	(England) Fulham	£12m
12 August 2016	DF	12	(Wales) James Chester (119)	(England) West Bromwich Albion	£8m
17 August 2016	MF	25	(Australia) Mile Jedinak (70)	(England) Crystal Palace	£4m
24 August 2016	DF	27	(Belgium) Ritchie De Laet (8)	(England) Leicester City	£2m
30 August 2016	FW	26	(Ivory Coast) Jonathan Kodjia (96)	(England) Bristol City	£15m
31 August 2016	MF	37	(Ghana) Albert Adomah (113)	(England) Middlesbrough	Undisclosed
20 January 2017	MF	5	(England) Henri Lansbury (41)	(England) Nottingham Forest	£2.75m
25 January 2017	DF	16	(England) James Bree (21)	(England) Barnsley	£3m
25 January 2017	MF	20	(Iceland) Birkir Bjarnason (48)	(Switzerland) Basel	Undisclosed
26 January 2017	MF	14	(Republic of Ireland) Conor Hourihane (132)	(England) Barnsley	Undisclosed
31 January 2017	DF	3	(Wales) Neil Taylor (89)	(Wales) Swansea City	Undisclosed
31 January 2017	FW	9	(England) Scott Hogan (56)	(England) Brentford	Undisclosed

EDS, Academy and other
Date	Position	No.	Player	From club	Transfer fee
31 January 2017	DF	—	(England) Jacob Bedeau	(England) Bury	Undisclosed

=== Transfers out ===
First Team
Exit date	Position	No.	Player	To club	Transfer fee
1 July 2016	MF	18	(England) Kieran Richardson	(Wales) Cardiff City (Note: Following Richardson's release, he signed for Cardiff City.)	Free transfer (Released)
1 July 2016	MF	28	(France) Charles N'Zogbia	Unattached	Free transfer (Released)
1 July 2016	DF	33	(Spain) José Ángel Crespo	(Greece) PAOK	Undisclosed
29 July 2016	GK	1	(United States) Brad Guzan	(England) Middlesbrough	Free transfer
2 August 2016	MF	8	(Senegal) Idrissa Gueye	(England) Everton	£7.1m
3 August 2016	DF	6	(Republic of Ireland) Ciaran Clark	(England) Newcastle United	£5m
7 August 2016	FW	9	(England) Scott Sinclair	(Scotland) Celtic	£3.5m
27 August 2016	DF	3	(England) Joe Bennett	(Wales) Cardiff City	Free transfer
27 August 2016	DF	5	(Denmark) Jores Okore	(Denmark) Copenhagen	Undisclosed
29 August 2016	DF	16	(England) Joleon Lescott	(Greece) AEK Athens	Free transfer
31 August 2016	FW	20	(Spain) Adama Traoré	(England) Middlesbrough	Undisclosed
4 January 2017	FW	14	(Benin) Rudy Gestede	(England) Middlesbrough	Undisclosed
31 January 2017	MF	15	(England) Ashley Westwood	(England) Burnley	Undisclosed
31 January 2017	FW	10	(Ghana) Jordan Ayew	(Wales) Swansea City	Undisclosed

EDS and Academy
Exit date	Position	No.	Player	To club	Transfer fee
1 July 2016	DF	26	(England) Lewis Kinsella	(England) Colchester United (Note: Following Kinsella's release, he signed for Colchester United.)	Free transfer (Released)
1 July 2016	DF	32	(Saint Lucia) Janoi Donacien	(England) Accrington Stanley (Note: Following Donacien's release, he signed for Accrington Stanley.)	Free transfer (Released)
1 July 2016	GK	—	(Switzerland) Benjamin Siegrist	(Liechtenstein) Vaduz	Free transfer
1 July 2016	GK	—	(England) Charlie Bannister	(England) Watford (Note: Following Bannister's release, he signed for Watford.)	Free transfer (Released)
1 July 2016	DF	—	(England) Josh Webb	(Scotland) Kilmarnock (Note: Following Webb's release, he signed for Kilmarnock.)	Free transfer (Released)
1 July 2016	DF	—	(England) Kodi Lyons-Foster	(England) Bristol City (Note: Following Lyons-Foster's release, he signed for Bristol City.)	Free transfer (Released)
4 July 2016	FW	37	(England) Callum Robinson	(England) Preston North End	Compensation (Note: Undisclosed compensation fee agreed between clubs after Robinson turned down new contract offer.)

=== Loans in ===
First Team
Start date	End date	Position	No.	Player	From club
5 January 2017	End of Season	GK	34	(England) Sam Johnstone	(England) Manchester United

EDS, Academy and other
Start date	End date	Position	No.	Player	From club

=== Loans out ===
First Team
Start date	End date	Position	No.	Player	To club
22 July 2016	End of season	MF	25	(Spain) Carles Gil	(Spain) Deportivo La Coruña
10 August 2016	End of season	MF	24	(Colombia) Carlos Sánchez	(Italy) Fiorentina
24 August 2016	End of season	MF	17	(France) Jordan Veretout	(France) Saint-Étienne
13 January 2017	End of season	GK	1	(Italy) Pierluigi Gollini	(Italy) Atalanta
16 January 2017	End of season	DF	28	(France) Aly Cissokho	(Greece) Olympiacos
30 January 2017	End of season	MF	8	(England) Aaron Tshibola	(England) Nottingham Forest
1 February 2017	End of season	FW	44	(Scotland) Ross McCormack	(England) Nottingham Forest

EDS, Academy and other
Start date	End date	Position	No.	Player	To club
12 July 2016	1 January 2017	MF	—	(England) Riccardo Calder	(England) Doncaster Rovers
4 August 2016	3 January 2017	DF	34	(England) Easah Suliman	(England) Cheltenham Town
6 August 2016	End of Season	DF	42	(England) Niall Mason	(England) Doncaster Rovers
25 August 2016	End of Season	MF	—	(England) Henry Cowans	(England) Stevenage
26 August 2016	3 January 2017	DF	46	(Republic of Ireland) Kevin Toner	(England) Walsall
31 August 2016	7 January 2017	MF	—	(England) Harry McKirdy	(England) Stevenage
31 January 2017	End of Season	DF	46	(Republic of Ireland) Kevin Toner	(England) Bradford City

== Non-competitive ==
=== Pre-season ===
Win Draw Loss

9 July 2016 Friendly	Grazer AK (Austria)	0–8	Aston Villa	Graz, Austria
17:30 BST		Report	Richards 12'; Ayew 19', 35'; Kozak 21'; Bennett 46', 83'; Gestede 63', 86'	Stadium: Sportzentrum Weinzödl

16 July 2016 Friendly	AFC Telford United	1–2	Aston Villa	Telford, England
12:00 BST	Hibbert 3'		Ayew 81'; Cissokho 89'	Stadium: New Bucks Head; Attendance: 2,884

16 July 2016 Friendly	Worcester City	1–5	Aston Villa	Stourport-on-Severn, England
15:00 BST	Birley 7'		Grealish 11'; Kozak 27'; Hepburn-Murphy 51'; Davis 84', 88'	Stadium: Walshes Meadow; Attendance: 1,972

20 July 2016 Friendly	Bristol Rovers	1–1	Aston Villa	Bristol, England
19:45 BST	Taylor 78'	Report	Ayew 42'	Stadium: Memorial Stadium; Attendance: 5,219

23 July 2016 Friendly	FC Nantes (France)	0–1	Aston Villa	Besançon, France
19:00 CEST		Report	Gestede 71'	Stadium: Stade Léo Lagrange; Referee: Yohann Rouinsard

26 July 2016 Friendly	Cambridge United	0–3	Aston Villa	Cambridge, England
19:30 BST		Report	Sinclair 8'; Hepburn-Murphy 8'; Gardner 78'	Stadium: Abbey Stadium; Attendance: 3,961

30 July 2016 Friendly	Aston Villa	1–3	Middlesbrough	Birmingham, England
15:00 BST	Baker 14'	Report	Negredo 60'; Fischer 75'; Rhodes 77'	Stadium: Villa Park; Attendance: 14,863; Referee: Steve Martin

== First team squad ==
N	Pos.	Nat.	Name	Age	EU	Since	App	Goals	Ends	Transfer fee	Notes
1	GK	(Italy)	Pierluigi Gollini	31	EU	2016	17	0	2020	£4.1M	On loan at Atalanta
2	CB	(England)	Nathan Baker	35	EU	2009	99	1	2019	YS	Academy Graduate
4	RB	(England)	Micah Richards	38	EU	2015	31	2	2019	Free	
5	CM	(England)	Henri Lansbury	36	EU	2017	1	0	2021	£2.75M	
6	CB	(England)	Tommy Elphick	39	EU	2016	14	0	2019	£3M	
7	MF	(Curaçao)	Leandro Bacuna	35	Non-EU	2013	110	7	2020	£800,000	
8	MF	(England)	Aaron Tshibola	31	EU	2016	7	1	2020	£5M	On loan at Nottingham Forest
10	FW	(Ghana)	Jordan Ayew	35	Non-EU	2015	53	10	2020	£9M	
11	FW	(England)	Gabriel Agbonlahor	40	EU	2005	375	84	2018	YS	Academy Graduate
12	DF	(Wales)	James Chester	37	EU	2016	17	0	2020	Undisclosed	Captain
13	GK	(England)	Jed Steer	34	EU	2013	4	0	2019	Free	
14	MF	(Republic of Ireland)	Conor Hourihane	35	EU	2017	0	0	2020	Undisclosed	
16	DF	(England)	James Bree	28	EU	2017	0	0	2021	Undisclosed	
18	FW	(Czech Republic)	Libor Kozák	37	EU	2013	20	4	2017	£4.88M	
19	LW	(England)	Andre Green	28	EU	2016	8	0	2018	YS	Academy Graduate
20	RB	(Iceland)	Birkir Bjarnason	38	EU	2017	0	0	2020	Undisclosed	
21	RB	(Scotland)	Alan Hutton	41	EU	2011	109	1	2017	£3.38M	
22	CM	(England)	Gary Gardner	34	EU	2011	29	1	2018	YS	Academy Graduate
23	LB	(France)	Jordan Amavi	32	EU	2015	25	0	2020	£8.25M	
25	CM	(Australia)	Mile Jedinak	42	Non-EU	2016	13	0	2019	£4M	
26	FW	(Ivory Coast)	Jonathan Kodjia	37	EU	2016	13	7	2020	£15M	
27	DF	(Belgium)	Ritchie De Laet	37	EU	2016	3	0	2019	£2M	
28	LB	(France)	Aly Cissokho	39	EU	2014	58	0	2018	£1.88M	On loan at Olympiacos
29	FW	(England)	Rushian Hepburn-Murphy	28	EU	2015	3	0	2017	YS	Academy Graduate
31	GK	(England)	Mark Bunn	41	EU	2015	15	0	2017	Free	
33	GK	(Montenegro)	Matija Sarkic	29	EU	2016	0	0	2017	YS	Academy Graduate
34	GK	(England)	Sam Johnstone	33	EU	2016	2	0	2017	Loan	On loan from Manchester United
36	FW	(England)	Jerell Sellars	30	EU	2015	0	0	2017	YS	Academy Graduate
37	RW	(Ghana)	Albert Adomah	38	EU	2016	11	1	2020	£6M	
38	DM	(Australia)	Jordan Lyden	30	Non-EU	2016	4	0	2017	YS	Academy Graduate
39	FW	(England)	Keinan Davis	28	EU	2016	2	0	2018	YS	Academy Graduate
40	MF	(England)	Jack Grealish	31	EU	2012	60	3	2018	YS	Academy Graduate
42	CB	(England)	Niall Mason	29	EU	2016	0	0	2017	YS	Academy Graduate; On loan at Doncaster Rovers
44	FW	(Scotland)	Ross McCormack	40	EU	2016	13	2	2020	£12M	On loan at Nottingham Forest
46	CB	(Republic of Ireland)	Kevin Toner	30	EU	2012	4	0	2018	YS	Academy Graduate; On loan at Bradford City
—	RW	(Spain)	Carles Gil	33	EU	2015 (Winter)	31	3	2019	£3.15M	On loan at Deportivo
—	DM	(Colombia)	Carlos Sánchez	40	Non-EU	2014	38	1	2018	£4.5M	On loan at Fiorentina
—	MF	(France)	Jordan Veretout	33	EU	2015	29	0	2020	£7.5M	On loan at Saint-Étienne

Updated to match played 26 November 2016
Source: avfc.co.uk
Ordered by squad number. Appearances include all competitive league and cup appearances, including as substitute.

== Squad statistics ==
As of 7 May 2017

Appearances (Apps.) numbers are for appearances in competitive games only including sub appearances
Numbers in parentheses denote appearances as substitute
Red card numbers denote: Numbers in parentheses represent red cards overturned for wrongful dismissal.

No.	Nat.	Player	Pos.	Championship				FA Cup				League Cup				Total			
No.	Nat.	Player	Pos.	Apps	Goal	Yellow card	Red card	Apps	Goal	Yellow card	Red card	Apps	Goal	Yellow card	Red card	Apps	Goal	Yellow card	Red card
2	(England)	Nathan Baker	CB	31 (1)	1	5	1	1				1				33 (1)	1	5	1
3	(Wales)	Neil Taylor	CB	14		2										14		2	
4	(England)	Micah Richards	CB	1 (1)								1				2 (1)			
5	(England)	Henri Lansbury	CM	17 (1)		2										17 (1)		2	
6	(England)	Tommy Elphick	CB	20 (6)		4										20 (6)		4	
7	(Curaçao)	Leandro Bacuna	RB	22 (8)	1	9	1	1								23 (8)	1	9	1
9	(England)	Scott Hogan	CF	9 (4)	1	2										9 (4)	1	2	
11	(England)	Gabriel Agbonlahor	CF	4 (9)	1	2		1								5 (7)		1	
12	(Wales)	James Chester	DF	45	3	6		1								46	3	6	
13	(England)	Jed Steer	GK																
14	(Republic of Ireland)	Conor Hourihane	MF	13 (4)	1	3										13 (4)	1	3	
16	(England)	James Bree	RB	6 (1)												6 (1)			
18	(Czech Republic)	Libor Kozák	FW	0 (2)												0 (2)			
19	(England)	Andre Green	LW	4 (11)		1		0 (1)				1				5 (12)		1	
20	(Iceland)	Birkir Bjarnason	LM	5 (3)												5 (3)			
21	(Scotland)	Alan Hutton	RB	31 (3)		5		1				0 (1)				32 (4)		5	
22	(England)	Gary Gardner	CM	18 (8)	1	2						1				19 (8)	1	2	
23	(France)	Jordan Amavi	LB	26 (8)		6		1				1				28 (8)		6	
25	(Australia)	Mile Jedinak	DM	33		8		1								34		8	
26	(Ivory Coast)	Jonathan Kodjia	FW	36	19	5	1									36	19	5	1
27	(Belgium)	Ritchie De Laet	DF	3		1										3		1	
29	(England)	Rushian Hepburn-Murphy	FW	0 (3)												0 (3)			
31	(England)	Mark Bunn	GK	5 (1)		1						1				6 (1)		1	
34	(England)	Sam Johnstone	GK	21				1								22			
35	(England)	Corey Blackett-Taylor	MF	0(1)												0(1)			
37	(Ghana)	Albert Adomah	MF	30 (8)	3	1		1								31 (8)	3	1	
38	(Australia)	Jordan Lyden	DM																
39	(England)	Keinan Davis	FW	0 (6)				0 (1)								0 (7)			
40	(England)	Jack Grealish	MF	20 (11)	5	5	1	1				1				22 (11)	5	5	1
1	(Italy)	Pierluigi Gollini*	GK	20												20			
5	(Denmark)	Jores Okore*	CB									1				1			
8	(England)	Aaron Tshibola*	MF	5 (3)	1	3		1				1				7 (3)	1	3	
10	(Ghana)	Jordan Ayew*	FW	17 (4)	2	5						1	1	1		18 (4)	3	6	
14	(Benin)	Rudy Gestede*	FW	8 (10)	4	3						0 (1)				8 (11)	4	3	
15	(England)	Ashley Westwood*	MF	18 (5)		3										18 (5)		3	
20	(Spain)	Adama Traoré*	RW	0 (1)												0 (1)			
28	(France)	Aly Cissokho*	LB	11 (1)		2										11 (1)		2	
44	(Scotland)	Ross McCormack*	FW	13 (7)	3	4		0 (1)				1		1		14 (8)	3	5	
46	(Republic of Ireland)	Kevin Toner*	CB																
Own goals					1				0				0				0		
Totals					47	80	4		0	0	0		1	2	0		48	82	4

Source: (for players and positions) First Team Squad (for squad numbers) Squad Profiles (for actual stats.) Squad Stats.

- (*)Player made appearance(s) before leaving the club on loan or permanently.

=== Suspensions ===
As of 31 January 2017

Player	Date Received	Offence	Length of suspension	
(Curaçao) Leandro Bacuna	(yellow card) v Barnsley, 27/9/16	5 cautions	1 match	Preston North End, Football League Championship
(England) Jack Grealish	15/10/16	Stamp; retrospective ban.	3 matches	Reading, Fulham, Birmingham City, Football League Championship
(Ghana) Jordan Ayew	(yellow card) v Birmingham City, 30/10/16	5 cautions	1 match	Blackburn Rovers, Football League Championship
(Scotland) Ross McCormack	(yellow card) v Blackburn Rovers, 5/11/16	5 cautions	1 match	Brighton & Hove Albion, Football League Championship
