= Glenn Whelan =

Irish footballer (born 1984)

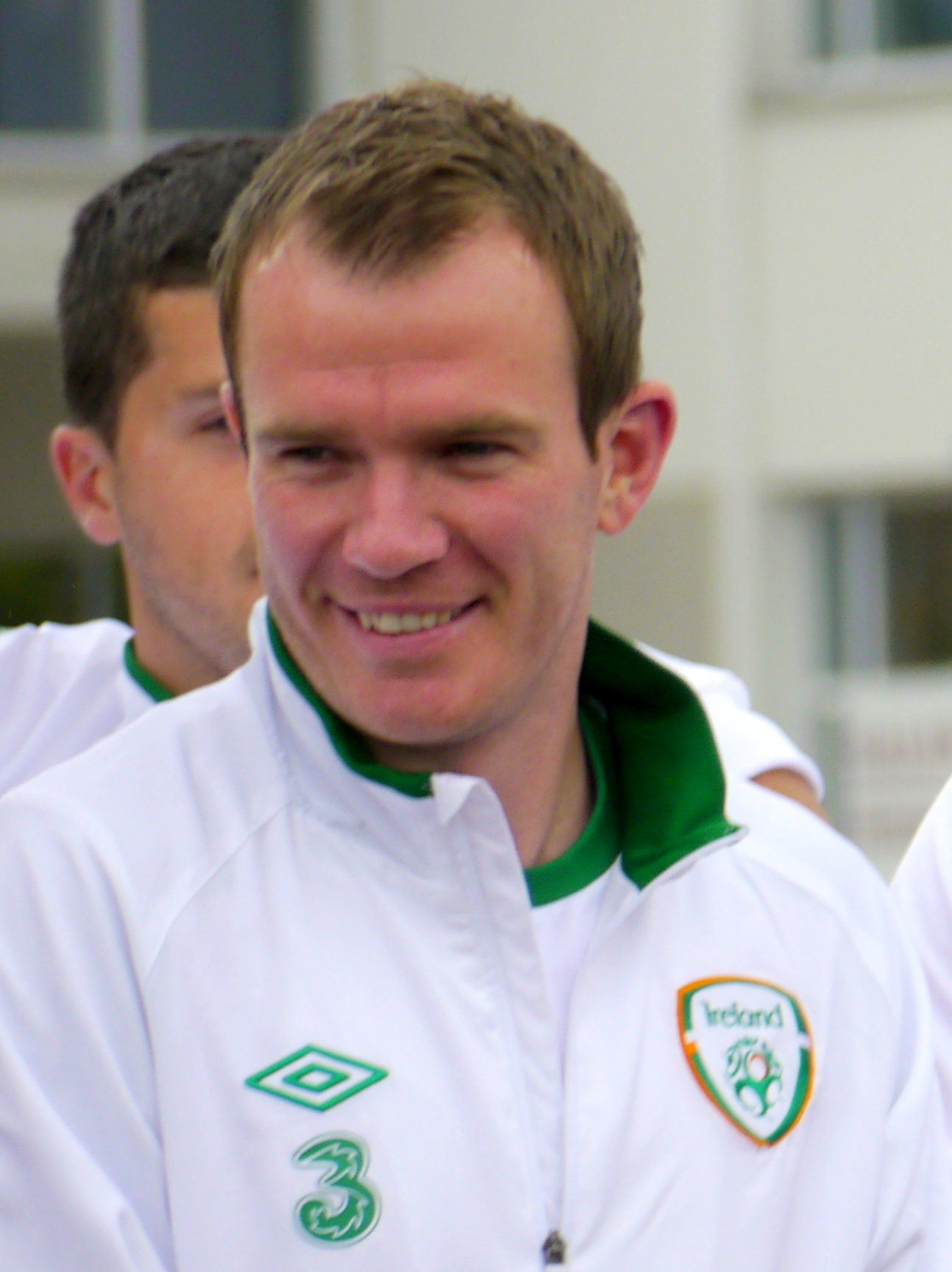
- Whelan in 2012

Personal information
- Full name: Glenn David Whelan
- Date of birth: 13 January 1984 (age 42)
- Place of birth: Dublin, Ireland
- Height: 1.80 m (5 ft 11 in)
- Position: Defensive midfielder

Youth career
- 2000–2001: Cherry Orchard
- 2001: Manchester City

Senior career*
Years	Team	Apps	(Gls)
2001–2004	Manchester City	0	(0)
2003	→ Bury (loan)	7	(0)
2003–2004	→ Bury (loan)	6	(0)
2004–2008	Sheffield Wednesday	142	(12)
2008–2017	Stoke City	291	(5)
2017–2019	Aston Villa	68	(2)
2019–2020	Heart of Midlothian	15	(0)
2020–2021	Fleetwood Town	34	(0)
2021	Wythenshawe	4	(0)
2021–2023	Bristol Rovers	43	(0)
Total		610	(19)

International career
2000	Republic of Ireland U16	2	(0)
2002–2005	Republic of Ireland U21	19	(2)
2007	Republic of Ireland B	1	(0)
2008–2019	Republic of Ireland	91	(2)

Managerial career
- 2025: Wigan Athletic (caretaker)
- 2026: Wigan Athletic (joint-caretaker)
- 2026: Livingston
- * Club domestic league appearances and goals

Glenn David Whelan (born 13 January 1984) is an Irish professional football coach and former player who played as a defensive midfielder. He was most recently the head coach of Scottish Championship club Livingston.

Whelan started his career at Manchester City, making only one first team appearance, in the UEFA Cup. After a loan spell at Bury, he joined Sheffield Wednesday, with whom he won promotion to the EFL Championship in 2005. In January 2008 Whelan joined Stoke City for a fee of £500,000, and helped them gain promotion to the Premier League. He took a while to establish himself in Tony Pulis' first team plans in the top flight, but became a regular by 2009 and went on to play for Stoke in the 2011 FA Cup Final. Whelan continued to be a regular in the team under Pulis and kept his place under Mark Hughes. He spent nine years at Stoke making 338 appearances, before joining Aston Villa in 2017 and then Hearts in 2019. He retired from playing in 2023, following spells with Fleetwood Town, Wythenshawe and Bristol Rovers.

A full international from 2008 to 2019, Whelan represented the Republic of Ireland at senior level, playing for his country at two UEFA European Championships (2012 and 2016), earning 91 caps as an international.

After coaching with Bristol Rovers and Wigan Athletic, Whelan was appointed head coach of Livingston in May 2026.

== Early life ==
Whelan was born in Dublin. He grew up in Clondalkin and attended St. Lorcan's Boys' National School.

== Club career ==
=== Manchester City ===
Whelan started his career with Manchester City joining from Irish feeder club Cherry Orchard in 2001. He made a solitary appearance in the UEFA Cup coming on as a substitute for Paul Bosvelt against Total Network Solutions in August 2003, before joining Bury on a one-month loan the following month. After appearing in the Republic of Ireland's 2003 FIFA World Youth Championship campaign in November and December, he returned to Bury on another one-month loan on 24 December 2003. In total Whelan played 15 times on loan at Bury and caught the attentions of Sheffield Wednesday manager Chris Turner.

=== Sheffield Wednesday ===
Whelan joined Sheffield Wednesday on a free transfer in the summer of 2004. He made his debut for Wednesday against Huddersfield Town on 21 August and in his next match, a League Cup tie against Walsall, he provided Lee Peacock with an assist and earned the praise from his manager. He scored his first goal for Wednesday in a 1–1 draw against Walsall in the league. His promising start to his Wednesday career took a knock as he was sent off in a League Cup tie against Coventry City for "violent conduct". However, caretaker manager Mark Smith criticised the referee's decision. Under new manager Paul Sturrock the team managed to finish in 5th position in 2004–05 claiming a play-off place where they defeated Brentford to reach the final. Whelan was voted "man of the match" in the League One play-off final against Hartlepool United at the Millennium Stadium in Cardiff after scoring the match-winning third goal for Wednesday.

After Wednesday won promotion to the Championship, Whelan was trialled as captain by Paul Sturrock after regular captain Lee Bullen was injured. Wednesday were able to avoid an instant return to the third tier in 2005–06 as they finished in 19th position, Whelan playing in 46 matches that season scoring once, which came in a 2–1 defeat against Watford.

In July 2006, Whelan was placed on the transfer list by Sturrock following increased competition for places in the Wednesday midfield after the arrival of Wade Small, Kenny Lunt and Yoann Folly. He was subsequently removed from the transfer list by the following manager, Brian Laws. Whelan repaid the faith shown in him with seven goals. He then went on to win a number of player of the year awards for the club's 2006–07 season. His performances led to manager Laws entering into contract negotiations with Whelan. Sheffield Wednesday rejected bids for Whelan from both Burnley and Plymouth Argyle in January 2008. However, a £500,000 bid from Stoke City was accepted on transfer deadline day.

=== Stoke City ===
Whelan joined Stoke City on 30 January 2008 for £500,000 signing a three-and-a-half-year contract. He made his first Stoke City appearance in a Championship match against Cardiff City on 2 February 2008 when he came on as a substitute in the 82nd minute for Mamady Sidibé. Whelan made his first Stoke City league start the following match in a 4–2 victory against Wolverhampton Wanderers. He scored his first goal for Stoke in a 2–1 home defeat to Crystal Palace on 7 April 2008. Whelan played 14 times for Stoke City in the 2007–08 season as Stoke finished 2nd and were promoted to the Premier League.

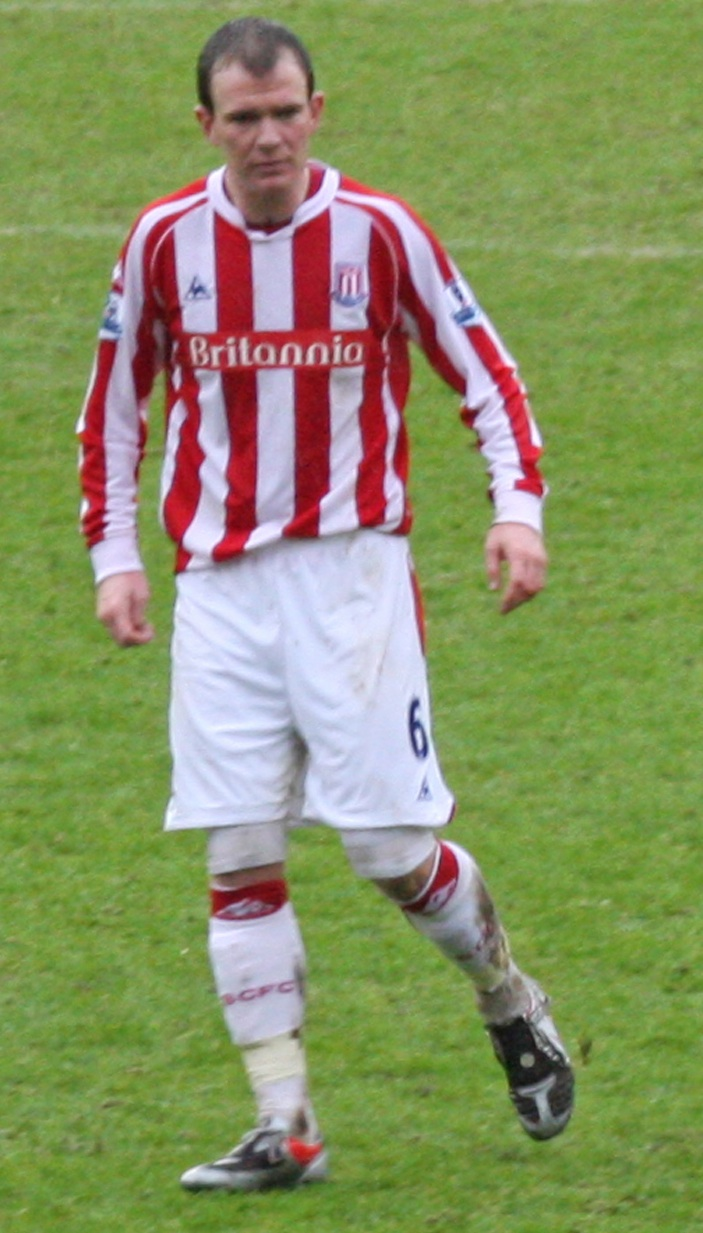
Whelan playing for Stoke City in 2010

Whelan started the club's first match in the Premier League against Bolton Wanderers. Whelan did not have a good match and as a result he did not feature much in the first team, only playing in League Cup fixtures and even reserve matches. Despite this setback, Whelan was still a regular in the Irish national team. In December 2008 Whelan was being linked with a move away from the Britannia Stadium but he revealed that he wanted to stay. Whelan did manage to force his way back into the first team and he became an important player in Stoke's successful fight for survival. Whelan scored a last minute equaliser away against Aston Villa on 1 March. Whelan signed a new four-year contract with Stoke on 15 September 2009. He scored his first goal of the 2009–10 season against Tottenham Hotspur which earned Stoke a 1–0 victory. He also went on to score against Manchester City in a 1–1 draw with Whelan beating fellow Irish international Shay Given. Arsenal player Aaron Ramsey praised Whelan for his support after Ramsey's suffered a leg break in a match between Stoke and Arsenal.

He made his 100th appearance for Stoke in a 2–0 win over Everton on 1 January 2011. After drifting in and out the starting eleven for most of the 2010–11 season Whelan made a return in March and played a key role in Stoke's run to their first FA Cup Final. Whelan reached a century of league appearances for the club on 8 May 2011 against Arsenal. Whelan played in the 2011 FA Cup Final as Stoke lost 1–0 to his old club Manchester City.

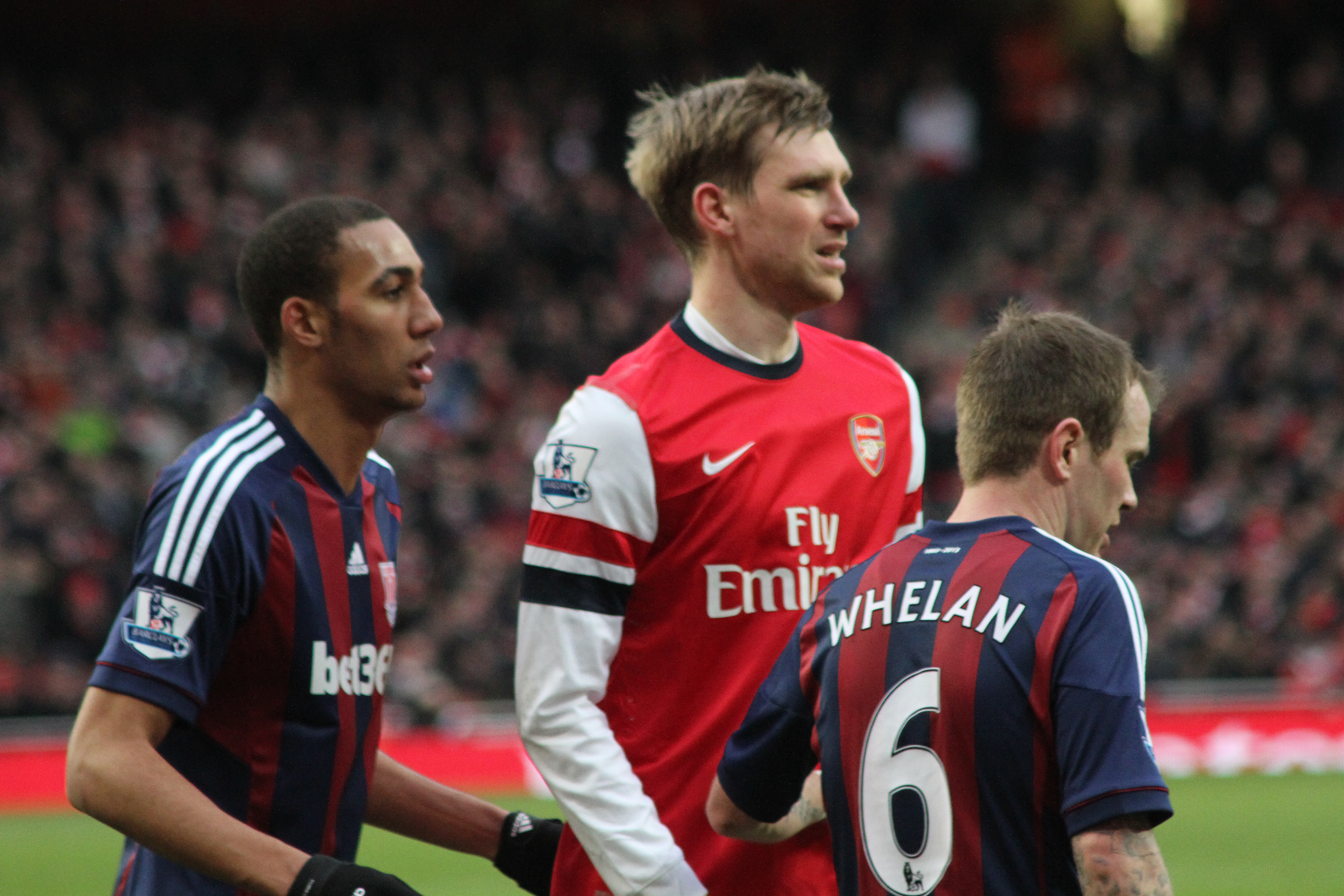
Whelan (right) playing for Stoke City in 2013

Whelan scored a rare goal for Stoke against FC Thun in the UEFA Europa League in August 2011. In a match against Bolton Wanderers referee Howard Webb awarded an indirect free-kick inside the penalty area for a back-pass against Whelan after two minutes. Kevin Davies scored from the quickly-taken restart to put Bolton ahead. Stoke chairman Peter Coates criticised Webb's controversial decision to penalise Whelan. He scored his first league goal for more than 18 months against Blackburn Rovers in November 2011. In January 2012, manager Tony Pulis confirmed that he wanted Whelan to sign a new contract stating "Every time you ask Glenn to step up to that next level, he does it. He's a good lad, very single-minded. He's got that Celtic blood in him and the determination to prove people wrong – including myself at times". Whelan signed a new three-and-a-half-year contract on 11 January 2012 and said "I am loving life at the moment and things are going really well, so I am absolutely delighted to commit my long-term future to the club".

In March 2012, Whelan made his 37th international appearance for the Republic of Ireland, with all of his caps coming whilst at Stoke he surpassed Gordon Banks' record becoming Stoke's most capped player. In the summer of 2012, Stoke signed midfielders Charlie Adam and Steven Nzonzi and Whelan's place in the side came under threat but he 'lifted his game' and retained his place for 2012–13 season. He avoided a ban after a 'two footed' tacked on Manchester City's Javi García in the FA Cup. Whelan played 34 times in 2012–13 as Stoke finished in 13th position. He ended the season on a sour note as he was involved in a dressing room bust-up with Kenwyne Jones.

At the end of the 2012–13 season Tony Pulis was replaced by Mark Hughes and Whelan stated that he hopes the change in style of play will help the team score more goals. Whelan initially had to fight for his place under Hughes at the start of the 2013–14 season but he soon became a regular in the side again. Whelan became a vital member of the team under Hughes and he made 36 appearances as Stoke finished in 9th position. Whelan described the 2013–14 season as his best for the club.

Whelan retained his place in the side at the start of the 2014–15 season before he was ruled out of six weeks suffered a fractured leg whilst on international duty with Ireland in October 2014. He returned to the side in December 2014 after successfully recovering from his injury. Whelan signed a two-year contract extension in January 2015. In February 2015, Following an injury to captain Ryan Shawcross, Whelan acted as stand-in captain and after a woeful 4–1 defeat against Blackburn Rovers in the FA Cup Whelan had a dressing room rant at his teammates. Whelan played 30 times for Stoke in 2014–15 as the Potters finished in 9th position for a second season running and they ended the campaign with a 6–1 victory against Liverpool. His performances during the campaign earn him the praise of teammates Adam and Shawcross who both described Whelan as the teams 'unsung-hero'.

Whelan was again a key figure under Hughes in 2015–16, making 42 appearances as Stoke again finished in 9th position. He also filled in as stand-in captain during the season due to injury to Ryan Shawcross. He made his 300th appearance for Stoke on 12 March 2016 against Southampton, however he was not to be on the winning team as Stoke lost 2–1 at home. At the end of the campaign, Whelan admitted that he was disappointed that the team did not finish higher in the table.

Prior to the start of the 2016–17 season, Whelan signed a one-year contract extension in July 2016, which ties him to Stoke until the summer of 2018. Whelan played 31 times in 2016–17, as Stoke finished in 13th position. Whelan gave an honest assessment of Stoke's campaign following a 2–2 away at AFC Bournemouth on 6 May 2017. "We're disappointed, being twice up away from home especially to a team like Bournemouth and giving away two sloppy goals pretty much sums up our season I think".

=== Aston Villa ===
Whelan joined Aston Villa on 20 July 2017 on a two-year contract for a fee of £1 million. He scored his first goal for Aston Villa in a 4–2 win at Sheffield Wednesday on 24 February 2018. Whelan played 35 times in the 2017–18 season, helping Villa reach the 2018 EFL Championship play-off final, in which they lost 1–0 to Fulham.

The following season Whelan missed a 97th-minute penalty in a 3–3 draw home to Preston. A cabbage was thrown at manager Steve Bruce who was subsequently sacked in favour of Dean Smith. Whelan made 38 appearances as Villa again managed to reach the play-off final this time beating Derby County 2–1. At the end of the campaign Whelan's contract was not renewed by Smith.

=== Heart of Midlothian ===
On 14 August 2019, Whelan joined Scottish Premiership side Heart of Midlothian on a one-year contract. He left the club in January 2020, after new manager Daniel Stendel had dropped him from the team. Whelan subsequently criticised Hearts, saying that he felt like he had been "thrown under a bus" by the club and described the way they handled his departure as "amateurish". Conversely, it was later revealed that Whelan had made little or no effort to become involved in the club, and – in the words of journalist Tom English – 'club, players and fans alike were unconvinced by the level of commitment the Ireland international showed towards the club ... [and] not one person is sorry to see him go. Not one.

=== Fleetwood Town ===
Whelan signed a short-term deal with League One club Fleetwood Town on 24 January 2020, joining until the end of the season.

=== Bristol Rovers ===
On 4 September 2021, Whelan joined recently relegated League Two club Bristol Rovers on a one-year deal, linking up with former Fleetwood manager Joey Barton having trained with the club for part of pre-season. On 11 September 2021, Whelan made his debut for the club playing the entirety of a 1–0 away defeat at Hartlepool United. On 13 November 2021, Whelan was sent off after receiving two bookings as Rovers held on to beat Northampton Town, a first sending-off since 2013. The season ended with Whelan securing a fourth career promotion, a 7–0 victory on the final day of the season moving Rovers into the final automatic promotion place, overtaking Northampton Town on goals scored having finished on the same points with the same goal difference. This was initially thought to be his last match for the club as he was released at the end of the season, but he returned to Rovers just a few weeks later on 29 July 2022 in the role of first-team coach, also being registered as a player if he were to be required.

Whelan made his final appearance of his career on the final day of the 2022–23 season in a 3–2 defeat to Bolton Wanderers. Having been brought on as a substitute, he himself was later substituted to a standing ovation at the Memorial Stadium. He continued on at the club in the role of a full-time coach.

== International career ==
In October 2000, Whelan played for the Republic of Ireland under-16 team in a qualifying tournament in Riga for the 2001 UEFA European Under-16 Championship. He represented the Republic of Ireland under-20 team at the 2003 FIFA World Youth Championship and has been capped 19 times by the Republic of Ireland under-21 team, captaining the side on many of these occasions.

His first cap for the Republic of Ireland national B team came on 20 November 2007 against Scotland. Whelan made his debut for the senior team against Serbia in May 2008 and scored his first international goal against Georgia in Mainzon 6 September 2008. Since the appointment of Giovanni Trapattoni, Whelan became a key member of the squad and made 11 straight appearances despite previously being considered an "also-ran". He scored his second goal for Ireland against Italy with a strike from almost 25 yards on 10 October 2009 in a 2–2 draw. Whelan started the matches in both legs against France as Ireland were controversially knocked out 2–1 on aggregate after extra-time.

Whelan again was present in Ireland's midfield for the UEFA Euro 2012 qualifying and he was also part of the team that secured qualification for UEFA Euro 2012 with an unprecedented 5–1 aggregate play-off win over Estonia. He was named in Trapattoni's 23-man squad for UEFA Euro 2012 in Poland and Ukraine. Ireland had a poor campaign and were eliminated after losing all three of their Group C fixtures.

Whelan won his 50th Irish cap on 14 August 2013 against Wales. He was deemed a "terrible" player by RTÉ pundit and former Republic of Ireland international Eamon Dunphy in the aftermath of a poor performance in a 2014 FIFA World Cup qualifying match against Sweden. Whelan responded to Dunphy, stating that he is nothing more than a "media bully".

Whelan was a part of the national team forUEFA Euro 2016, where they lost to France in round of 16.

In October 2019, Whelan earned his 90th cap against Switzerland making him the ninth-most capped Irish player of all time.

== Coaching career ==
In October 2022, Whelan was a part of the Republic of Ireland Under-16s coaching team at the Victory Shield competition.

Having held a coaching role at his last playing club Bristol Rovers, Whelan departed the club in December 2023 following the appointment of new manager Matt Taylor.

In February 2024, Whelan joined the coaching staff of the Republic of Ireland senior national team under interim manager John O’Shea, serving as an assistant coach alongside Paddy McCarthy. He remained part of O’Shea's staff for the March and June 2024 international windows.

In September 2024, he was appointed as the new first team coach at EFL League One side Wigan Athletic. Following the sacking of Shaun Maloney on 2 March 2025, Whelan was appointed caretaker manager. He departed the club in February 2026, following the appointment of Gary Caldwell as head coach.

Whelan was appointed head coach of Scottish Championship club Livingston in May 2026. He was sacked on 6 September 2026, after nine games in charge.

== Personal life ==
Whelan grew up in Dublin as a Liverpool supporter; however, he cites Paul McGrath as his hero. Whilst living in Dublin, Whelan attended matches at League of Ireland side St Patrick's Athletic and cites Paul Osam as his favourite St Pat's player, stating Osam was the player that inspired him to play football. Whelan is married to Karren, with whom he has a daughter, Abbie and a son Jack. The couple live in Wilmslow, Cheshire.

In January 2022, Whelan avoided a driving ban due to mitigating circumstances of needing to be able to drive to and from matches.

== Career statistics ==
=== Club ===
Appearances and goals by club, season and competition
Club	Season	League			FA Cup		League Cup		Other		Total	
Club	Season	Division	Apps	Goals	Apps	Goals	Apps	Goals	Apps	Goals	Apps	Goals
Manchester City	2001–02	First Division	0	0	0	0	0	0	—		0	0
Manchester City	2002–03	Premier League	0	0	0	0	0	0	—		0	0
Manchester City	2003–04	Premier League	0	0	0	0	0	0	1 (Note: Appearance in UEFA Cup)	0	1	0
Manchester City	Total		0	0	0	0	0	0	1	0	1	0
Bury (loan)	2003–04	Third Division	13	0	1	0	0	0	1 (Note: Appearance in Football League Trophy)	0	15	0
Sheffield Wednesday	2004–05	League One	36	2	1	1	2	0	3 (Note: Appearances in League One play-offs)	1	42	4
Sheffield Wednesday	2005–06	Championship	43	1	1	0	2	0	—		46	1
Sheffield Wednesday	2006–07	Championship	38	7	2	0	1	1	—		41	8
Sheffield Wednesday	2007–08	Championship	25	2	2	0	3	1	—		30	3
Sheffield Wednesday	Total		142	12	6	1	8	2	3	1	159	16
Stoke City	2007–08	Championship	14	1	0	0	0	0	—		14	1
Stoke City	2008–09	Premier League	26	1	1	0	4	2	—		31	3
Stoke City	2009–10	Premier League	33	2	4	0	1	0	—		38	2
Stoke City	2010–11	Premier League	29	0	7	0	3	0	—		39	0
Stoke City	2011–12	Premier League	30	1	4	0	2	0	7 (Note: Appearances in UEFA Europa League)	1	43	2
Stoke City	2012–13	Premier League	32	0	2	0	0	0	—		34	0
Stoke City	2013–14	Premier League	32	0	1	0	3	0	—		36	0
Stoke City	2014–15	Premier League	28	0	2	0	0	0	—		30	0
Stoke City	2015–16	Premier League	37	0	1	0	4	0	—		42	0
Stoke City	2016–17	Premier League	30	0	0	0	1	0	—		31	0
Stoke City	Total		291	5	22	0	18	2	7	1	338	8
Aston Villa	2017–18	Championship	33	1	0	0	0	0	2 (Note: Appearances in Championship play-offs)	0	35	1
Aston Villa	2018–19	Championship	35	1	1	0	1	0	1	0	38	1
Aston Villa	Total		68	2	1	0	1	0	3	0	73	2
Heart of Midlothian	2019–20	Scottish Premiership	15	0	0	0	2	0	—		17	0
Fleetwood Town	2019–20	League One	11	0	0	0	0	0	2 (Note: Appearances in League One play-offs)	0	13	0
Fleetwood Town	2020–21	League One	23	0	1	0	3	0	3 (Note: Appearances in EFL Trophy)	0	30	0
Fleetwood Town	Total		34	0	1	0	3	0	5	0	43	0
Wythenshawe Amateurs	2021–22	NWCFL Division One South	4	0	0	0	0	0	0	0	4	0
Bristol Rovers	2021–22	League Two	31	0	2	0	0	0	0	0	33	0
Bristol Rovers	2022–23	League One	12	0	2	0	1	0	3 (Note: Appearances in EFL Trophy)	0	18	0
Bristol Rovers	Total		43	0	4	0	1	0	3	0	51	0
Career total			610	19	35	1	33	4	22	2	696	26

=== International ===
Appearances and goals by national team and year
National team	Year	Apps	Goals
Republic of Ireland	2008	7	1
Republic of Ireland	2009	10	1
Republic of Ireland	2010	8	0
Republic of Ireland	2011	11	0
Republic of Ireland	2012	9	0
Republic of Ireland	2013	10	0
Republic of Ireland	2014	6	0
Republic of Ireland	2015	8	0
Republic of Ireland	2016	9	0
Republic of Ireland	2017	6	0
Republic of Ireland	2018	1	0
Republic of Ireland	2019	6	0
Total		91	2

Scores and results list Republic of Ireland's goal tally first, score column indicates score after each Whelan goal.

List of international goals scored by Glenn Whelan
No.	Date	Venue	Cap	Opponent	Score	Result	Competition	Ref.
1	6 September 2008	Stadion am Bruchweg, Mainz, Germany	4	Georgia	2–0	2–1	2010 FIFA World Cup qualification	
2	10 October 2009	Croke Park, Dublin, Ireland	15	Italy	1–0	2–2	2010 FIFA World Cup qualification	

== Honours ==
Sheffield Wednesday

- Football League One play-offs: 2005

Stoke City

- Football League Championship runner-up: 2007–08
- FA Cup runner-up: 2010–11

Aston Villa

- EFL Championship play-offs: 2019

Bristol Rovers

- EFL League Two third-place promotion: 2021–22

Republic of Ireland

- Nations Cup: 2011

Individual

- Sheffield Wednesday Player of the Year: 2007
- FAI Under 21 International Player of the Year: 2004
