= Jonathan Kodjia =

Footballer (born 1989)

Personal information
- Full name: Jonathan Adjo Kodjia
- Date of birth: 22 October 1989 (age 37)
- Place of birth: Saint-Denis, France
- Height: 1.91 m (6 ft 3 in)
- Position: Forward

Senior career*
Years	Team	Apps	(Gls)
2008–2014	Reims	22	(0)
2011–2012	→ Cherbourg (loan)	16	(3)
2012–2013	→ Amiens (loan)	34	(9)
2013–2014	→ Caen (loan)	27	(5)
2013–2014	→ Caen B (loan)	2	(0)
2014–2015	Angers	28	(15)
2015–2016	Bristol City	49	(19)
2016–2020	Aston Villa	96	(29)
2020–2022	Al-Gharafa	30	(18)
2022–2023	Umm Salal	13	(4)
2023–2024	Annecy	10	(0)
2024–2025	Versailles	13	(2)

International career^{‡}
2016–2021	Ivory Coast	27	(11)
- * Club domestic league appearances and goals as of 10 April 2026 (UTC) ‡ National team caps and goals as of 30 March 2021 (UTC)

Jonathan Adjo Kodjia (born 22 October 1989) is a professional footballer who plays as a forward for seven-a-side club Wolf Pack FC. Born in France, he played for the Ivory Coast national team at International level.

Kodjia started his career at Reims and gained experience in the Championnat National (French third division) and Ligue 2 with Cherbourg, Caen and Amiens. Kodjia moved to Angers in 2014, ultimately winning Ligue 2 Player of the Year 2015 and being named in the Ligue 2 Team of the Season.

== Early life ==
Kodjia was born in Saint-Denis, a commune in the northern suburbs of Paris. After leaving school in 2007, he enrolled at college to build on his baccalaureate in accountancy. At the age of 18, he was approached by an agent who got in touch with him and said he’d seen him playing and found him interesting. The agent then arranged a trial with Ligue 2 side Stade de Reims, where he scored 3 goals and signed a professional contract six months later.

== Club career ==
=== Reims ===
Kodjia made his professional debut in a 4–1 loss against Dijon. In the first four seasons at the club, Kodjia rarely played and was never able to score for the Reims first team, his most productive campaign being when he made 13 appearances after the club had dropped into France's third tier. Successful loan moves to Cherbourg, Caen and Amiens earned him a move to Angers.

=== Angers ===
Kodjia moved to Angers in 2014 where he won the Ligue 2 Player of the Year 2015 and was also named in the Ligue 2 Team of the Season, after scoring 15 goals in 29 games during the 2014–15 Ligue 2 to help Angers gain promotion to the French top flight after finishing in 3rd place. On 1 August 2014, he made his Angers debut in a 3–2 away loss against Nîmes, also scoring his first two goals for the club in the same game.

=== Bristol City ===
Kodjia joined Bristol City on a three-year deal for £2 million from Angers, with the option of a further year on 20 July 2015. He scored his first competitive goal for Bristol City on 15 August 2015 in a 4–2 defeat to Brentford, converting a pass from Luke Ayling to give City a 1–0 lead. He scored 20 goals in 48 appearances in his debut season at Bristol City.

=== Aston Villa ===
On 30 August 2016, 26-year-old Kodjia signed on a four-year contract with newly demoted Aston Villa. The initial fee of £11 million, potentially rising to £15 million, was a record fee for City. He scored his first league goal for Roberto Di Matteo's team in his second game against Brentford. Kodjia's next goal came in a 1–1 draw against Wolverhampton Wanderers from the spot after Jack Grealish was fouled in Steve Bruce's first game as Villa manager. He then scored the opener in a 2–1 win away at Reading just three days later. His late acrobatic goal against Fulham on 22 October won the game 1–0 for Villa, making it three goals in three games and back to back wins for the club.

Kodjia started November in top form bagging two goals against a struggling Blackburn Rovers on side on Bonfire night to help Villa come from 1–0 down to win the game 2–1. His seventh goal of the season then came later in the month with a fine header in a 3–1 win over Cardiff City at Villa Park. Kodjia scored six goals in Steve Bruce's first seven games in charge and his form helped propel Villa from the relegation zone up to 11th within Bruce's first month at the club. Kodjia's performances won him the PFA Championship player of the month for November. He broke his ankle in April 2017, which prematurely ended his season and would see him miss the beginning of the 2017–18 season. He finished the season with 19 goals in 36 games in his first season.

Kodjia injured his ankle again in the derby match against Birmingham City in October 2017 which was further aggravated on international duty, the injury required surgery which ruled him out until March 2018. He returned from injury to help Villa reach the 2018 EFL Championship play-off final, playing in the final as a substitute, as Villa lost 1–0 to Fulham in the final and thus missed out on promotion to the Premier League.

On 22 April 2019, Kodjia scored the only goal in a 1–0 win over Millwall which helped the club set a new record of ten successive wins. On 28 April 2019, he was injured while playing against Leeds United. With Villa players wanting the ball put out of play so that Kodjia could receive treatment, Leeds continued playing and scored. Following the goal, there was a large confrontation between the opposing sides, which led the Leeds coach, Marcelo Bielsa, to allow Aston Villa to equalise unchallenged.

=== Al-Gharafa ===
On 19 January 2020, Kodjia was presented to the media by Al-Gharafa in the Qatar Stars League, coached by former Premier League manager Slaviša Jokanović. On 23 January 2020, he made his debut in a 4–2 win over Al-Rayyan, in which he scored a hat-trick.

=== Umm Salal ===
In July 2022, Kodjia signed for fellow Qatar Stars League club Umm Salal. He made his debut on 1 August 2022, in a 1–0 defeat to Al Ahli.

=== Annecy ===
On 22 August 2023, Kodjia returned to France when he joined Ligue 2 club Annecy on a free transfer.

=== Versailles ===
On 18 August 2024, Kodjia signed for semi-pro Championnat National club FC Versailles 78 on a free transfer.

=== Wolf Pack FC ===
After departing Versailles, Kodjia joined seven-a-side team Wolf Pack FC in Gerard Piqué's Kings League France as well as representing Team France in the league's international format.

== International career ==
Kodjia was born in France to Ivorian parents. He was contacted first by the Benin Football Association as his surname has origins in that country, but was not eligible. He was later called up by the Ivory Coast national team in May 2016 and made his debut in a friendly versus Hungary in a 0–0 draw. He scored his first international goal against Gabon on 4 June 2016, volleying home to score the first goal of the game. Ivory Coast would go on to win 2–1.

== Career statistics ==
=== Club ===
As of match played 18 April 2025

Appearances and goals by club, season and competition
Club	Season	League			National cup		League cup		Other		Total	
Club	Season	Division	Apps	Goals	Apps	Goals	Apps	Goals	Apps	Goals	Apps	Goals
Reims	2008–09	Ligue 2	2	0	0	0	0	0	—		2	0
Reims	2009–10	Championnat National	13	0	0	0	0	0	—		13	0
Reims	2010–11	Ligue 2	5	0	1	0	0	0	—		6	0
Reims	2011–12	Ligue 2	2	0	1	0	1	0	—		4	0
Reims	Total		22	0	2	0	1	0	0	0	25	0
Cherbourg (loan)	2011–12	Championnat National	16	4	0	0	0	0	—		16	4
Amien (loan)	2012–13	Championnat National	34	9	0	0	1	0	—		35	9
Caen B (loan)	2013–14	Championnat de France Amateur 2	2	0	—		—		—		2	0
Caen (loan)	2013–14	Ligue 2	27	5	3	0	2	2	—		32	7
Angers	2014–15	Ligue 2	28	15	0	0	1	0	—		29	15
Bristol City	2015–16	Championship	45	19	2	1	1	0	—		48	20
Bristol City	2016–17	Championship	4	0	0	0	0	0	—		4	0
Bristol City	Total		49	19	2	1	1	0	0	0	52	20
Aston Villa	2016–17	Championship	36	19	0	0	0	0	—		36	19
Aston Villa	2017–18	Championship	15	1	0	0	0	0	3 (Note: Appearances in EFL Championship play-offs)	0	18	1
Aston Villa	2018–19	Championship	39	9	1	0	1	0	2	0	43	9
Aston Villa	2019–20	Premier League	6	0	1	0	2	2	—		9	2
Aston Villa	Total		96	29	2	0	3	2	5	0	105	31
Al-Gharafa	2019–20	Qatar Stars League	10	7	1	0	0	0	0	0	11	7
Al-Gharafa	2020–21	Qatar Stars League	20	11	4	0	1	0	2 (Note: Appearances in Emir of Qatar Cup)	1	27	12
Al-Gharafa	Total		30	18	5	0	1	0	2	1	38	19
Umm Salal	2022–23	Qatar Stars League	13	4	0	0	0	0	0	0	13	4
Annecy	2023–24	Ligue 2	10	0	0	0	—		—		10	0
Versailles	2024–25	Championnat National	13	2	1	1	—		—		14	3
Career total			340	105	14	2	10	4	7	1	372	112

=== International ===
As of match played 30 March 2021

Appearances and goals by national team and year
National team	Year	Apps	Goals
Ivory Coast	2016	6	3
Ivory Coast	2017	5	2
Ivory Coast	2018	4	2
Ivory Coast	2019	9	4
Ivory Coast	2020	1	0
Ivory Coast	2021	2	0
Total		27	11

Scores and results list Ivory Coast's goal tally first, score column indicates score after each Kodjia goal.

List of international goals scored by Jonathan Kodjia
No.	Date	Venue	Opponent	Score	Result	Competition
1	4 June 2016	Stade Bouaké, Bouaké, Ivory Coast	Gabon	1–0	2–1	Friendly
2	3 September 2016	Stade Bouaké, Bouaké, Ivory Coast	Sierra Leone	1–0	1–1	2017 Africa Cup of Nations qualification
3	8 October 2016	Stade Bouaké, Bouaké, Ivory Coast	Mali	1–1	3–1	2018 FIFA World Cup qualification
4	11 January 2017	New York University Stadium, Abu Dhabi, United Arab Emirates	Uganda	1–0	3–0	Friendly
5	24 March 2017	Krasnodar Stadium, Krasnodar, Russia	Russia	1–0	2–0	Friendly
6	9 September 2018	Stade Régional Nyamirambo, Kigali, Rwanda	Rwanda	1–0	2–1	2019 Africa Cup of Nations qualification
7	12 October 2018	Stade Bouaké, Bouaké, Ivory Coast	Central African Republic	1–0	4–0	2019 Africa Cup of Nations qualification
8	26 March 2019	Stade Félix Houphouët-Boigny, Abidjan, Ivory Coast	Liberia	1–0	1–0	Friendly
9	19 June 2019	Zayed Sports City Stadium, Abu Dhabi, United Arab Emirates	Zambia	1–1	4–1	Friendly
10	24 June 2019	Al Salam Stadium, Cairo, Egypt	South Africa	1–0	1–0	2019 Africa Cup of Nations
11	11 July 2019	Suez Stadium, Suez, Egypt	Algeria	1–1	1–1	2019 Africa Cup of Nations

== Honours ==
Angers

- Ligue 2 third-place promotion: 2014–15

Aston Villa

- EFL Championship play-offs: 2019

Individual

- Ligue 2 Player of the Year: 2015
- Ligue 2 Team of the Season: 2014–15
- EFL Championship PFA Player of the Month: November 2016
