= Josh Onomah =

English footballer (born 1997)

Personal information
- Full name: Joshua Oghenetega Peter Onomah
- Date of birth: 27 April 1997 (age 29)
- Place of birth: Enfield, England
- Height: 6 ft 1 in (1.85 m)
- Position: Midfielder

Youth career
- 2013–2015: Tottenham Hotspur

Senior career*
Years	Team	Apps	(Gls)
2015–2019	Tottenham Hotspur	13	(0)
2017–2018	→ Aston Villa (loan)	33	(4)
2018–2019	→ Sheffield Wednesday (loan)	15	(0)
2019–2023	Fulham	64	(4)
2023	Preston North End	13	(0)
2024–2025	Blackpool	15	(1)
2026	Dinamo Tbilisi	5	(0)

International career
2012–2013	England U16	6	(1)
2013–2014	England U17	13	(1)
2014–2015	England U18	6	(0)
2015–2016	England U19	14	(4)
2016–2017	England U20	10	(0)
2016–2018	England U21	7	(2)
- * Club domestic league appearances and goals as of 12:24, 13 July 2026 (UTC)

Joshua Oghenetega Peter Onomah (born 27 April 1997) is an English professional footballer who most recently played for Dinamo Tbilisi.

Onomah came through the academy system at Tottenham Hotspur, and was a regular youth international for England, including winning the 2017 FIFA U-20 World Cup and the 2014 UEFA European Under-17 Championship.

== Club career ==
=== Tottenham Hotspur ===
Born in Enfield, Greater London, Onomah came through the academy system at Tottenham Hotspur. He was first called up for the first team on 5 January 2015, remaining an unused substitute in their 1–1 draw away to Burnley in the FA Cup third round, and made his debut nine days later in the replay, replacing Andros Townsend for the last 15 minutes of a 4–2 victory at White Hart Lane. On 24 May, he was included in the matchday squad for a Premier League game for the first time, remaining unused as Tottenham won 1–0 at Everton in the last game of the season.

In the 2015–16 season, Onomah changed his shirt number to 25, which was included on the club's list of first-team numbers. He made his Premier League debut in a 3–1 home victory over Aston Villa on 2 November 2015, replacing Dele Alli for the final minutes. On 10 December, Onomah made his first start for Tottenham playing 90 minutes in a 4–1 victory over AS Monaco.

On 4 August 2017, Onomah joined Aston Villa on loan for the season. He scored his first goal for Aston Villa in a 1–1 draw at Bristol City on 25 August 2017.

On 31 August 2018, Onomah joined Championship side Sheffield Wednesday on loan for the season.

=== Fulham ===
On the final day of the 2019 transfer window Onomah joined Fulham, as part of the £25 million transfer that saw Ryan Sessegnon move in the other direction. He scored his first goal for Fulham in a 2–1 win over Leeds United on 21 December 2019.

On 27 July 2020, Onomah scored a solo goal to open the scoring against Cardiff in the first leg of their EFL Championship play-off semi-final. The match ended in a 2–0 win for Fulham. After making 39 appearances for Fulham over the next 30 months, Onomah's contract was mutually terminated on 31 January 2023.

=== Preston North End ===
On 31 January 2023, Preston announced they had signed Onomah on a short term deal until the end of the season. On 27 June 2023, it was confirmed that Josh Onomah would leave Preston upon the expiration of his contract.

After his release from Preston, Onomah joined Stoke City on trial.

=== Blackpool ===
On 3 October 2024, Onomah joined Blackpool on a short-term deal. On 14 January 2025, Blackpool announced that Onomah had signed a contract extension to the end of the season. On 5 May 2025, Blackpool announced that Onomah would be leaving the club on the expiry of his contract on 30 June 2025.

=== Dinamo Tbilisi ===
After nine months without a club, Onomah signed a one-year contract, with the option of an additional year, for Erovnuli Liga club Dinamo Tbilisi on 20 March 2026.

== International career ==
Born in England, Onomah is of Nigerian descent. He has represented England up to the under-21 level. In May 2014, Onomah was part of the England squad that won the 2014 UEFA European Under-17 Championship, playing the full 90 minutes in the final against the Netherlands. In 2015, Onomah scored the equaliser against Croatia U-19 in a 1–1 draw. During the elite round of 2016 UEFA European Under-19 Championship qualification, held in March 2016, Onomah scored in wins against Georgia and group hosts Spain as England qualified for the final tournament by winning the group.

Onomah represented England at the 2016 UEFA European Under-19 Championship and made 4 appearances in the tournament where England finished semi-finalists.

=== 2017 FIFA U-20 World Cup ===
Onomah was in the England under-20 team in the 2017 FIFA U-20 World Cup. He received a red card in the quarter-finals match against Mexico, so he missed the semi-final against Italy. He returned for the final where England beat Venezuela 1–0, which is England's first win in a global tournament since their World Cup victory of 1966.

== Club statistics ==
As of match played 27 June 2026

Appearances and goals by club, season and competition
Club	Season	League			National cup (Note: Includes FA Cup, Georgian Cup)		League Cup (Note: Includes EFL Cup)		Continental		Other		Total	
Club	Season	Division	Apps	Goals	Apps	Goals	Apps	Goals	Apps	Goals	Apps	Goals	Apps	Goals
Tottenham Hotspur	2014–15	Premier League	0	0	1	0	0	0	0 (Note: Appearances in the UEFA Europa League)	0	—		1	0
Tottenham Hotspur	2015–16	Premier League	8	0	4	0	0	0	7	0	—		19	0
Tottenham Hotspur	2016–17	Premier League	5	0	3	0	2	1	2 (Note: Two appearances in the UEFA Champions League, zero appearances in the UEFA Europa League)	0	—		12	1
Tottenham Hotspur	2017–18	Premier League	0	0	0	0	0	0	0 (Note: Appearances in the UEFA Champions League)	0	—		0	0
Tottenham Hotspur	2018–19	Premier League	0	0	0	0	0	0	0	0	—		0	0
Tottenham Hotspur	Total		13	0	8	0	2	1	9	0	-	-	32	1
Aston Villa (loan)	2017–18	Championship	33	4	1	0	2	0	—		1 (Note: Appearances in the EFL Championship play-offs)	0	37	4
Sheffield Wednesday (loan)	2018–19	Championship	15	0	0	0	0	0	—		—		15	0
Fulham	2019–20	Championship	31	3	2	0	1	0	—		3	1	37	4
Fulham	2020–21	Premier League	11	0	2	0	2	0	—		—		15	0
Fulham	2021–22	Championship	20	1	0	0	2	0	—		—		22	1
Fulham	2022–23	Premier League	2	0	0	0	0	0	—		—		2	0
Fulham	Total		64	4	4	0	5	0	3	1	0	0	76	5
Preston North End	2022–23	Championship	13	0	0	0	0	0	—		—		13	0
Blackpool	2024–25	League One	15	1	2	0	0	0	—		1 (Note: Appearances in EFL Trophy)	0	18	1
Dinamo Tbilisi	2026	Erovnuli Liga	5	0	0	0	—		0 (Note: Appearances in UEFA Conference League)	0	1 (Note: Appearances in Georgian Super Cup)	0	6	0
Career total			143	8	13	0	9	1	13	1	1	0	179	10

== Honours ==
Fulham

- EFL Championship: 2021–22; play-offs: 2020

England U17

- UEFA European Under-17 Championship: 2014

England U20

- FIFA U-20 World Cup: 2017
