= Rekeem Harper =

English footballer (born 2000)

Personal information
- Full name: Rekeem Jordon Harper
- Date of birth: 8 March 2000 (age 26)
- Place of birth: Birmingham, England
- Height: 6 ft 2 in (1.88 m)
- Position: Midfielder

Team information
- Current team: Barrow
- Number: 26

Youth career
- 2012–2017: West Bromwich Albion

Senior career*
Years	Team	Apps	(Gls)
2017–2021	West Bromwich Albion	29	(1)
2017	→ Blackburn Rovers (loan)	4	(0)
2021	→ Birmingham City (loan)	18	(0)
2021–2023	Ipswich Town	13	(0)
2022	→ Crewe Alexandra (loan)	15	(0)
2022–2023	→ Exeter City (loan)	20	(1)
2023–2024	Burton Albion	27	(0)
2024–2025	Port Vale	18	(1)
2025–	Barrow	33	(2)

International career
2017	England U17	3	(0)
2018–2019	England U19	7	(0)
- * Club domestic league appearances and goals as of 23:45, 4 May 2026 (UTC)

Rekeem Jordan Harper (born 8 March 2000) is an English professional footballer who plays as a midfielder for National League club Barrow. He represented England up to under-19 level.

Born in Birmingham, Harper came through the Academy at West Bromwich Albion, turning professional after making his first appearance in the Premier League in August 2017. He spent much of the first half of the 2017–18 season on loan at Blackburn Rovers. He was named West Brom's Young Player of the Year for the 2018–19 campaign and made ten Championship appearances as the club secured promotion back to the Premier League at the end of the 2019–20 season. He spent the second half of the 2020–21 season on loan at Birmingham City. He was sold to League One club Ipswich Town for a £500,000 fee in June 2021. He spent the second half of the 2021–22 season on loan at Crewe Alexandra and the whole of the 2022–23 season at Exeter City. He left Ipswich and spent the 2023–24 season with Burton Albion before he joined Port Vale in November 2024. He was promoted out of League Two with the club at the end of the 2024–25 season. He joined Barrow in June 2025, with whom he was relegated with.

== Early life ==
Rekeem Jordon Harper was born in Birmingham on 8 March 2000. He attended Aston Manor Academy and went to Aston Villa matches at Villa Park with family and friends as a child.

== Club career ==
=== West Bromwich Albion ===
Harper joined West Bromwich Albion at the age of 12. He spent five years in the West Brom Academy, where he was converted from a striker into a box-to-box midfielder. He made his professional debut on 12 August 2017 as a second-half substitute in Albion's 1–0 win over AFC Bournemouth, in doing so becoming only the second Premier League player to have been born in the 2000s. In August 2017, Harper signed his first professional contract with the club, a deal to run for two years. Manager Tony Pulis looked to get the teenager out on loan to gain experience in the EFL before giving him more gametime in the Premier League. On 31 August, newly relegated League One club Blackburn Rovers signed Harper on loan for the 2017–18 season. Manager Tony Mowbray said it was an opportunity for the youngster to "play some football and enjoy himself and show everyone his talent" whilst competing with Corry Evans, Peter Whittingham and Willem Tomlinson for a first-team spot alongside Richard Smallwood. He made his first start for Rovers on 12 September in the club's 1–0 win over Scunthorpe United. He said he was learning from the older pros at Ewood Park. He received a red card for a professional foul in an FA Cup tie against Crewe Alexandra on 3 December – Mowbray said he was "baffled" by the referee's decision. He made nine appearances for Blackburn, of which just one was a league start, before new Albion manager Alan Pardew recalled him to The Hawthorns in the New Year as he looked to personally assess the club's young players.

After returning to West Brom, Harper made his first appearance of the 2018–19 season in an EFL Cup tie on 14 August, starting in a 1–0 win against Luton Town. His playing time was initially limited under manager Darren Moore as contract negotiations stalled, with Jake Livermore, Gareth Barry and James Morrison ahead of him in the pecking order, though in January he managed to establish himself in the team behind a front two of Dwight Gayle and Jay Rodriguez following a suspension to Livermore. He scored the first senior goal of his career on 27 April, a 79th-minute winner in a 2–1 win over Rotherham United in Albion's final home game of the 2018–19 season. Caretaker manager Jimmy Shan, who had coached Harper throughout his time at the West Brom Academy, said that "he's come into the changing room at the end of the game with a smile from ear to ear". Harper made 23 appearances throughout the season, scoring once, helping West Brom to qualify for the EFL Championship play-offs following a fourth-place league finish. His performances during the season earned him the club's Young Player of the Year award. In July 2019, following many months of negotiations, he signed a new three-year contract with West Brom. He had previously been linked with moves to Liverpool, Tottenham Hotspur and Juventus.

Harper made his first appearance of the 2019–20 season as a second-half substitute in the season's opening match, a 2–1 win against Nottingham Forest. Harper found regular game time limited during the season under new manager Slaven Bilić – who criticised his application, having to wait until 25 February before he made his first league start under the new manager whilst Sawyers was serving a suspension. He played well and went on to make four starts and six substitute appearances in the league to help West Brom to win promotion to the Premier League following a second-place finish in the Championship. He made 13 appearances in total during the season and was praised by Bilic for improving as a footballer.

Following West Brom's return to the Premier League, Harper made his first appearance of the 2020–21 season on the opening match day, coming on as a substitute in a 3–0 defeat to Leicester City. He scored his first goal of the season in the following match against Harrogate Town in an EFL Cup second round tie on 16 September, scoring Albion's opening goal in a 3–0 win with a shot from outside the 18-yard box. His only other appearance for the Baggies during the 2020–21 season came as a substitute in a 4–0 loss to Arsenal on 2 January. He fell behind Romaine Sawyers, Jake Livermore and Conor Gallagher in the pecking order as Bilic felt that he lacked consistency. New manager Sam Allardyce allowed him to leave the club on loan. On 21 January, Harper joined Championship club Birmingham City on loan for the remainder of the 2020–21 season. He was signed to link midfield and attack as a number eight. He made his debut on 30 January as a second-half substitute in a 1–1 draw with Coventry City. He played well for Lee Bowyer's Blues despite the team struggling and falling to some heavy defeats and he said that Bowyer lifted the mood of the dressing room at St Andrew's after he replaced Aitor Karanka as manager. Harper made 18 appearances in all competitions during his time on loan at Birmingham. A permanent transfer away from West Brom was arranged, with the final deal only confirmed once incoming manager Valérien Ismaël approved of it.

=== Ipswich Town ===
On 25 June 2021, Harper joined Ipswich Town for an undisclosed fee, believed to be £500,000 and rising to £1 million if all clauses were met. He signed a three-year contract with the club, with the option of a further one-year extension. He made his debut for the club in the first game of the season against Morecambe at Portman Road on 7 August and started the first six games of the 2021–22 season alongside Lee Evans, though dropped down the pecking order after Paul Cook signed Sam Morsy. He appeared 18 times in all competitions for the Tractor Boys before departing on loan. On 31 January 2022, Harper joined fellow League One side Crewe Alexandra, who were 13 places below Ipswich and six points shy of safety from relegation, on loan for the remainder of the 2021–22 season. Manager Kieran McKenna said that the loan move worked for all parties as Crewe boss David Artell and his coaching staff followed the club's "tradition of a good way of doing things on the pitch". The Railwaymen were relegated at the end of the season after losing in 15 of Harper's 18 appearances at Gresty Road.

On 24 August 2022, Harper joined League One side Exeter City on loan for the 2022–23 season. Marcus Flitcroft, Head of Player Recruitment for the Grecians, stated that "he's a dynamic and composed midfielder that... we have [been] monitoring for a while". He began well at St James Park, contributing two assists as he formed a strong early partnership with Archie Collins in a 3–4–1–2 shape under the stewardship of Matt Taylor. However, he did not feature from the appointment of manager Gary Caldwell on 24 October until he impressed in a surprise inclusion at Milton Keynes Dons on 28 January. On 18 February, he was shown a red card after picking up two yellow cards in a 1–0 defeat at Port Vale, which led Caldwell to heavily criticise the referee. Harper's contract with Ipswich was terminated by mutual consent on 28 June 2023.

=== Burton Albion ===
On 29 June 2023, Harper joined League One club Burton Albion on a two-year deal. He said that "the manager has seen the strengths in my game and seen the things to work on. He has ambitions and as a player I share those visions." He made 34 appearances across the 2023–24 season, though never managed to secure a consistent place in the first XI as the Brewers rotated managers from Dino Maamria to Gary Mills and then Martin Paterson. He left the Pirelli Stadium by mutual consent on 30 August 2024. Bendik Hareide, the Brewers sporting director, explained that the club saw "a bit bigger potential" in Kegs Chauke over Harper.

=== Port Vale ===
On 1 November 2024, Harper was reunited with his former West Brom manager Darren Moore when he joined League Two club Port Vale on a deal until the end of the 2024–25 season. He was sent off on his league debut for the Valiants in a 1–1 draw with local rivals Crewe Alexandra at Vale Park on 25 November. He returned to the first XI, though was then sidelined with a muscle strain the following month. He was released upon the expiry of his contract at the end of the season after promotion was secured.

=== Barrow ===
On 16 June 2025, Harper returned to League Two by signing a two-year deal with Barrow. He said that his ambitions aligned with that of manager Andy Whing. He missed seven weeks due to injury at the start of the 2025–26 season. He scored two goals in 35 games, and on 2 May, following a 2–1 defeat to Newport County, Barrow were relegated from League Two.

On 3 October 2026, he scored a goal in his fourth consecutive game, securing a 2–1 win over Wealdstone at Holker Street.

== International career ==
Harper was born in England of Jamaican descent. In February 2017, he represented England U17 in matches against Portugal, Germany and the Netherlands. In September 2018, he started for England Under-19 against Belgium. He played alongside Phil Foden and Jadon Sancho, and later said that "I remember... looking at those players and thinking this is the level you want to be at every week" and that "it's a really special memory I hold".

== Style of play ==
Harper is a versatile and intelligent midfielder who can contribute in both attack and defence with his strong physical attributes and sound technical ability. He describes himself as "an all-rounded midfielder who likes to play forward and take risk, and most importantly I'm a hard worker". His balance and powerful box-to-box style as a teenager earned him comparisons to Patrick Vieira. His career declined since that time, however. He is a player who requires his confidence to be built up in order to play at his best.

== Career statistics ==
As of match played 2 May 2026

Appearances and goals by club, season and competition
Club	Season	League			FA Cup		EFL Cup		Other		Total	
Club	Season	Division	Apps	Goals	Apps	Goals	Apps	Goals	Apps	Goals	Apps	Goals
West Bromwich Albion U23s	2016–17	—			—		—		3 (Note: Appearance(s) in EFL Trophy)	0	3	0
West Bromwich Albion	2017–18	Premier League	1	0	—		1	0	—		2	0
West Bromwich Albion	2018–19	Championship	16	1	3	0	3	0	1 (Note: Appearance in Championship play-offs)	0	23	1
West Bromwich Albion	2019–20	Championship	10	0	2	0	1	0	—		13	0
West Bromwich Albion	2020–21	Premier League	2	0	0	0	2	1	—		4	1
West Bromwich Albion	Total		29	1	5	0	7	1	1	0	42	2
Blackburn Rovers (loan)	2017–18	League One	4	0	3	0	—		2	0	9	0
Birmingham City (loan)	2020–21	Championship	18	0	—		—		—		18	0
Ipswich Town	2021–22	League One	13	0	2	0	0	0	3	0	18	0
Ipswich Town	2022–23	League One	0	0	0	0	1	0	0	0	1	0
Ipswich Town	Total		13	0	2	0	1	0	3	0	19	0
Crewe Alexandra (loan)	2021–22	League One	15	0	—		—		—		15	0
Exeter City (loan)	2022–23	League One	20	1	0	0	—		3	0	23	1
Burton Albion	2023–24	League One	27	0	1	0	1	0	5	0	34	0
Port Vale	2024–25	League Two	18	1	0	0	—		3	1	21	2
Barrow	2025–26	League Two	33	2	1	0	0	0	1	0	35	2
Barrow	2026–27	National League	0	0	0	0	—		0	0	0	0
Barrow	Total		33	2	1	0	0	0	1	0	35	2
Career total			177	5	12	0	9	1	21	1	219	7

== Honours ==
West Bromwich Albion

- EFL Championship second-place promotion: 2019–20

Port Vale

- EFL League Two second-place promotion: 2024–25

Individual

- West Bromwich Albion Young Player of the Year: 2018–19
