= Glenn Johnstone =

English footballer

Personal information
- Full name: Glenn Paul Johnstone
- Date of birth: 5 June 1967 (age 59)
- Place of birth: Preston, England
- Position: Goalkeeper

Senior career*
| Years | Team | Apps | (Gls) |
| 1986–1992 | Lancaster City | | |
| 1992–1993 | Preston North End | 10 | (0) |
| 1993–? | Morecambe | | |
- * Club domestic league appearances and goals

Glenn Paul Johnstone (born 5 June 1967) is an English former footballer who played as a goalkeeper. He played in The Football League for Preston North End during the 1992–93 season. He was signed from Lancaster City and later left Preston for Morecambe.

== Personal life ==
He is the father of Wolves and England goalkeeper Sam Johnstone.
