= Freddie Anderson (soccer) =

American soccer player (born 2006)

Personal information
- Full name: Freddie Samuel Anderson
- Date of birth: October 13, 2006 (age 20)
- Place of birth: England
- Position: Center-back

Team information
- Current team: Stoke City
- Number: 43

Youth career
- Liverpool
- –2023: Manchester City
- 2023–2024: Stoke City

Senior career*
Years	Team	Apps	(Gls)
2024–	Stoke City	0	(0)
2025	→ Cork City (loan)	31	(1)
2026	→ Barrow (loan)	4	(0)

International career^{‡}
2025–	United States U19	1	(0)
2025–	United States U20	1	(0)
- * Club domestic league appearances and goals as of 17:55, May 3, 2026 (UTC) ‡ National team caps and goals as of November 15, 2025

Freddie Samuel Anderson (born October 13, 2006) is a professional soccer player who plays as a center-back for Stoke City. Born in England, he represents the United States at youth international level.

== Club career ==
He joined Stoke City in the summer of 2023 having previously been involved in the youth academies at Liverpool and Manchester City. He signed a three-year professional contract with Stoke when he turned 17 years-old in October 2023. He made his professional debut in the EFL Cup against Carlisle United on August 13, 2024. He scored Stoke's first goal in a 2–0 victory.

On January 23, 2025, Anderson joined League of Ireland Premier Division club Cork City on loan for the 2025 season. He scored his first goal for the club on May 2, 2025, with a 74th minute equaliser in a 1–1 draw with Shamrock Rovers at Turners Cross. On 9 November 2025, he started in the 2025 FAI Cup final, as his side were defeated 2–0 by Shamrock Rovers at the Aviva Stadium. Anderson signed a new two-and-a-half year contract with Stoke in January 2026. He then joined EFL League Two side Barrow on loan for the remainder of the 2025–26 season. Anderson only made four appearances in a struggling Barrow team who went on to be relegated from the English Football League.

== International career ==
Having previously been on standby for the England U20 side, he was called-up by United States U20 in January 2025 for a training camp in preparation for the under-20 2025 World Cup in Chile.

== Personal life ==
He is the son of former England international soccer player Viv Anderson. He is of Jamaican descent through his father, and American descent through his mother.

== Career statistics ==
As of match played August 25, 2026

Appearances and goals by club, season and competition
Club	Season	League			National cup (Note: Includes FA Cup & FAI Cup)		League cup (Note: Includes EFL Cup)		Other		Total	
Club	Season	Division	Apps	Goals	Apps	Goals	Apps	Goals	Apps	Goals	Apps	Goals
Stoke City	2024–25	Championship	0	0	0	0	1	1	—		1	1
Stoke City	2025–26	Championship	0	0	0	0	0	0	—		0	0
Stoke City	2026–27	Championship	0	0	0	0	1	0	—		1	0
Stoke City	Total		0	0	0	0	2	1	—		2	1
Cork City (loan)	2025	LOI Premier Division	31	1	5	0	—		1 (Note: Appearance in the Munster Senior Cup)	0	37	1
Barrow (loan)	2025–26	League Two	4	0	0	0	—		0	0	4	0
Career total			35	1	5	0	2	1	1	0	43	2
