= 2018–19 West Bromwich Albion F.C. season =

West Bromwich Albion F.C.
2018–19 season
- Owner: Lai Guochuan
- Head Coach: Darren Moore (until 9 March); James Shan (caretaker, from 9 March)
- Stadium: The Hawthorns
- Championship: 4th
- FA Cup: Fourth round replay
- EFL Cup: Third round
- Play-offs: Semi-finals
- Top goalscorer: League: Dwight Gayle (23 goals); All: Dwight Gayle (24 goals)
- Highest home attendance: League/All: 26,548 v. Sheffield Wednesday (29 December 2018)
- Lowest home attendance: League: 20,282 v. Swansea City (13 March 2019); All: 8,645 v. Brighton & Hove Albion (6 February 2019, FA Cup R4 replay)
- Average home league attendance: 24,148
- Biggest win: 7–1 v. Queens Park Rangers (18 August 2018)
- Biggest defeat: 0–4 v. Leeds United (1 March 2019)
Home colours	Away colours	Third colours

The 2018–19 season is West Bromwich Albion's first season in the Championship since 2009–10 and their 141st year in existence. In this season the club participated in the Championship, FA Cup and League Cup. On 18 May 2018, caretaker manager and former player Darren Moore was given the permanent job, after earning 11 points from 6 games in the previous season. He was sacked on 9 March 2019, despite the club sitting fourth in the table, a series of poor results forced the board to make the decision and the club 'will always hold Darren in such high regard'. First team coach James Shan took over as caretaker manager, who has been working for the club academy from under-7s age group all the way to under-23s.

They lost to local rivals Aston Villa on penalties in the play-offs semi-final on 14 May, failing to make an immediate return to the Premier League.

The season covers the period from 1 July 2018 to 30 June 2019, with competitive matches played between August and May.

== Background ==
Albion unveiled new kits for the season, manufactured by Puma. The home kit featured the team's traditional navy blue and white vertical striped shirts, white shorts and white socks. The wide vertical stripes on the jersey and italic WBA lettering on the socks were designed as a tribute to the club's "iconic" kit of the late 1970s. Two change kits were produced, which the club intended to be worn "as much as possible in equal measure" throughout the season. One of the change kits featured yellow and green stripes, while an alternative change kit had a black and cyan design. The goalkeeper kit was black with grey trim at home and purple for away matches. Ideal Boilers were the club's main shirt sponsor, in the first year of a two-year deal; this led to the introduction of a new mascot, a combi boiler character nicknamed "Boiler Man" by fans, though "Baggie Bird" remained Albion's main mascot. 10Bet provided secondary shirt sponsorship worth £1 million.

Graeme Jones left his position with the Belgium national team to join Albion as assistant head coach.

Immediately prior to the start of the season, most bookmakers listed Albion as second favourites (behind Stoke City) to win promotion, quoting odds of promotion between 2/1 and 10/3. Odds of the club being relegated were between 22/1 and 40/1.

== First team ==
Squad No.	Name	Nationality	Position (s)	Date of birth (age)	Signed from
Goalkeepers
1	Sam Johnstone	(England)	GK	25 March 1993 (age 33)	(England) Manchester United
13	Boaz Myhill	(Wales)	GK	9 November 1982 (age 43)	Free agent
23	Jonathan Bond	(England)	GK	19 May 1993 (age 33)	(England) Reading
Defenders
3	Kieran Gibbs	(England)	LB	26 September 1989 (age 36)	(England) Arsenal
5	Kyle Bartley	(England)	CB	22 May 1991 (age 35)	(England) Swansea City
12	Tyrone Mears	(England)	RB	18 February 1983 (age 43)	Free agent
14	Conor Townsend	(England)	LB	4 March 1993 (age 33)	(England) Scunthorpe United
24	Tosin Adarabioyo	(England)	RB/CB	24 September 1997 (age 28)	(England) Manchester City (on loan)
25	Craig Dawson	(England)	RB/CB	6 May 1990 (age 36)	(England) Rochdale
26	Ahmed Hegazi	(Egypt)	CB	25 January 1991 (age 35)	(Egypt) Al Ahly
68	Mason Holgate	(England)	RB/CB	22 October 1996 (age 29)	(England) Everton (on loan)
Midfielders
6	Stefan Johansen	(Norway)	CM	8 January 1991 (age 35)	(England) Fulham (on loan)
7	James Morrison	(Scotland)	AM	25 May 1986 (age 40)	Middlesbrough
8	Jake Livermore	(England)	CM	14 November 1989 (age 36)	(England) Hull City
10	Matt Phillips	(Scotland)	RM	13 March 1991 (age 35)	(England) Queens Park Rangers
11	Chris Brunt (captain)	(Northern Ireland)	CM	14 December 1984 (age 41)	(England) Sheffield Wednesday
15	Jefferson Montero	(Ecuador)	LW	1 September 1989 (age 37)	(England) Swansea (on loan)
17	Oliver Burke	(Scotland)	RM	7 April 1997 (age 29)	(Germany) RB Leipzig
18	Gareth Barry	(England)	CM	23 February 1981 (age 45)	(England) Everton
20	Jonathan Leko	(England)	RM	24 April 1999 (age 27)	Academy
22	Wes Hoolahan	(Republic of Ireland)	AM	20 May 1982 (age 44)	Free agent
28	Sam Field	(England)	CM	8 May 1998 (age 28)	Academy
34	Rekeem Harper	(England)	CM	26 April 2000 (age 26)	Academy
70	Jacob Murphy	(England)	RW	24 February 1995 (age 31)	(England) Newcastle United (on loan)
Forwards
4	Hal Robson-Kanu	(Wales)	ST	21 May 1989 (age 37)	Free agent
16	Dwight Gayle	(England)	ST	17 October 1989 (age 36)	(England) Newcastle United (on loan)
19	Jay Rodriguez	(England)	ST	29 July 1989 (age 37)	(England) Southampton
21	Kyle Edwards	(England)	ST	17 February 1998 (age 28)	Academy

== Competitions ==
=== Pre-season ===
Albion faced Barnet, Swindon Town, Aberdeen, Barnsley and Coventry City in pre-season friendly matches.

7 July 2018 Friendly	Barnet	0–3	West Bromwich Albion	Canons Park
12:30 BST		Report	Edwards 67'; Robson-Kanu 75' (pen.), 78'	Stadium: The Hive Stadium

14 July 2018 Friendly	Swindon Town	1–3	West Bromwich Albion	Swindon
15:00 BST	Elijah Adebayo 44'	Report	Rodriguez 30'; Edwards 69'; Jameson 82'	Stadium: County Ground

20 July 2018 Friendly	Aberdeen	1–1	West Bromwich Albion	Aberdeen, Scotland
19:30 BST	Cosgrove 37'	Report	Livermore 41'	Stadium: Pittodrie

24 July 2018 Friendly	Barnsley	2–3	West Bromwich Albion	Barnsley
19:30 BST	Isgrove 6'; Moore 11'	Report	Robson-Kanu 44'; Morrison 46'; Cavaré 51' (o.g.)	Stadium: Oakwell

28 July 2018 Regis Shield	West Bromwich Albion	5–2	Coventry City	West Bromwich
15:00 BST	Barnes 6'; Barnes 8'; Robson-Kanu 31', 40'; Livermore 51'	Report	Allassani 44'; Thompson 78'	Stadium: The Hawthorns; Attendance: 7,590
Note: Playing for the inaugural Regis Shield

=== Championship ===
West Bromwich Albion will compete in the 2018–19 EFL Championship, the third season of English football's second division under the EFL Championship name. It was Albion's first season back in the Championship following the club's relegation from the Premier League in 2017–18, their 39th season in the second tier of English football and their 120th season of league football in all. West Brom's provisional fixture list was announced on 21 June 2018, but a number of matches were subsequently rescheduled for live broadcast on Sky Sports. The away matches at Middlesbrough, Birmingham City, Ipswich Town and Sheffield United, as well as the home match against Aston Villa, were moved from a Saturday afternoon to the preceding Friday night. The home games versus Leeds United and Brentford were also moved from Saturday afternoon, the former to a Saturday early evening kickoff and the latter to Monday night. The away games at Nottingham Forest and Sheffield Wednesday and the home match against Derby County were televised by Sky Sports on their originally scheduled dates, with the Derby game changed to an 8pm kickoff. In addition, all midweek games were made available live via the red button.

==== League table ====
Pos	Team	Pld	W	D	L	GF	GA	GD	Pts	Promotion, qualification or relegation
1	Norwich City (C, P)	46	27	13	6	93	57	+36	94	Promotion to the Premier League
2	Sheffield United (P)	46	26	11	9	78	41	+37	89	Promotion to the Premier League
3	Leeds United	46	25	8	13	73	50	+23	83	Qualification for Championship play-offs (Note: Four teams play for one spot and promotion to the Premier League.)
4	West Bromwich Albion	46	23	11	12	87	62	+25	80	Qualification for Championship play-offs
5	Aston Villa (O, P)	46	20	16	10	82	61	+21	76	Qualification for Championship play-offs
6	Derby County	46	20	14	12	69	54	+15	74	Qualification for Championship play-offs
7	Middlesbrough	46	20	13	13	49	41	+8	73	

Source: Sky Sports Archived 25 September 2019 at the Wayback Machine
Rules for classification: 1) Points; 2) Goal difference; 3) Number of goals scored; 4) Head-to-head results
(C) Champions; (O) Play-off winners; (P) Promoted

==== Results summary ====
Overall								Home						Away					
Pld	W	D	L	GF	GA	GD	Pts	W	D	L	GF	GA	GD	W	D	L	GF	GA	GD
46	23	11	12	87	62	+25	80	12	7	4	53	31	+22	11	4	8	34	31	+3

Last updated: 5 May 2019.
Source: BBC

==== Results by matchday ====
Matchday	1	2	3	4	5	6	7	8	9	10	11	12	13	14	15	16	17	18	19	20	21	22	23	24	25	26	27	28	29	30	31	32	33	34	35	36	37	38	39	40	41	42	43	44	45	46
Ground	H	A	A	H	A	H	A	H	H	A	A	H	A	H	H	A	H	A	A	H	H	A	A	H	H	A	H	A	H	A	H	A	A	H	A	H	H	A	H	A	A	H	H	A	H	A
Result	L	D	W	W	L	W	D	W	W	W	D	W	L	L	D	L	W	W	W	D	D	W	W	W	D	L	D	W	L	W	D	W	W	L	L	D	W	W	W	L	L	W	W	D	W	L
Position	22	17	8	3	7	8	5	3	3	1	4	2	3	4	5	7	5	2	4	3	3	3	3	3	3	4	4	3	4	4	4	4	4	4	4	4	4	4	4	4	4	4	4	4	4	4

Updated to match(es) played on 5 May 2019. Source: 11v11 for league tables and fixtures
A = Away; H = Home; W = Win; D = Draw; L = Loss

==== Matches ====
4 August 2018 1	West Bromwich Albion	1–2	Bolton Wanderers	West Bromwich
15:00 BST	Barnes 45+1'	Report	Magennis 18'; Wildschut 89'	Stadium: The Hawthorns; Attendance: 25,901 (2,519 away); Referee: Geoff Eltringham

7 August 2018 2	Nottingham Forest	1–1	West Bromwich Albion	West Bridgford
19:45 BST	Guedioura 59'	Report	Phillips 87'	Stadium: City Ground; Attendance: 27,850 (1,957 away); Referee: Darren England

11 August 2018 3	Norwich City	3–4	West Bromwich Albion	Norwich
15:00 BST	Rhodes 24'; Pukki 70'; Hanley 82'	Report	Rodriguez 33' (pen.), 47'; Barnes 65'; Robson-Kanu 79'	Stadium: Carrow Road; Attendance: 25,144 (1,483 away); Referee: Lee Mason

18 August 2018 4	West Bromwich Albion	7–1	Queens Park Rangers	West Bromwich
19:45 BST	Phillips 29', 88'; Gibbs 53'; Rodriguez 56' (pen.), 82' (pen.); Gayle 67'; Robson-Kanu 90+1'	Report	Lynch 34'	Stadium: The Hawthorns; Attendance: 22,753 (1,169 away); Referee: Tony Harrington

24 August 2018 5	Middlesbrough	1–0	West Bromwich Albion	Middlesbrough
19:45 BST	Ayala 90+1'	Report		Stadium: Riverside Stadium; Attendance: 22,906 (652 away); Referee: John Brooks

1 September 2018 6	West Bromwich Albion	2–1	Stoke City	West Bromwich
15:00 BST	Gayle 16', 59'	Report	Pieters 90+5'	Stadium: The Hawthorns; Attendance: 25,183 (2,600 away); Referee: Simon Hooper

14 September 2018 7	Birmingham City	1–1	West Bromwich Albion	Birmingham
19:45 BST	Jota 27' (pen.)	Report	Phillips 39'	Stadium: St Andrew's; Attendance: 22,715 (2,984 away); Referee: Andrew Madley

18 September 2018 8	West Bromwich Albion	4–2	Bristol City	West Bromwich
19:45 BST	Rodriguez 16' (pen.), 28'; Gayle 24'; Barnes 63'	Report	Kelly 60'; Diédhiou 68'	Stadium: The Hawthorns; Attendance: 22,051 (1,824 away); Referee: Jeremy Simpson

22 September 2018 9	West Bromwich Albion	2–0	Millwall	West Bromwich
15:00 BST	Gayle 68'; Gibbs 76'	Report		Stadium: The Hawthorns; Attendance: 23,563 (2,299 away); Referee: Tim Robinson

29 September 2018 10	Preston North End	2–3	West Bromwich Albion	Preston
15:00 BST	Hughes 71'; Browne 90+6'	Report	Rodriguez 48'; Davies 73' (o.g.); Gayle 88'	Stadium: Deepdale; Attendance: 14,099 (3,192 away); Referee: Tony Harrington

3 October 2018 11	Sheffield Wednesday	2–2	West Bromwich Albion	Owlerton
19:45 BST	Reach 24'; Forestieri 41'	Report	Pelupessy 85' (o.g.); Barnes 87'	Stadium: Hillsborough Stadium; Attendance: 22,150 (814 away); Referee: Oliver Langford

6 October 2018 12	West Bromwich Albion	4–1	Reading	West Bromwich
15:00 BST (UTC+1)	Dawson (yellow card) 41'; Gayle 49', 65'; Barry (yellow card) 52'; Barnes 72'; Bartley 80'	Report	Bacuna 6'; Swift (yellow card) 51'; Ilori (yellow card) 56'; Moore (yellow card) 82'	Stadium: The Hawthorns; Attendance: 22,865 (907 away); Referee: Darren England

20 October 2018 13	Wigan Athletic	1–0	West Bromwich Albion	Wigan
15:00 BST	Morsy (yellow card) 18'; James (yellow card) 19'; Dunkley (yellow card) 59'; Windass 74'	Report	Dawson (yellow card) 24'; Rodriguez (yellow card) 28'; Livermore (yellow card) 34' (yellow-red card) 84'; Barnes (yellow card) 48'; Brunt (yellow card) 58'	Stadium: DW Stadium; Attendance: 12,739 (3,750 away); Referee: Jeremy Simpson

24 October 2018 14	West Bromwich Albion	1–4	Derby County	West Bromwich
20:00 BST	Rodriguez 83'	Report	Marriott 10'; Lawrence 15'; Wilson 51'; Malone 71'	Stadium: The Hawthorns; Attendance: 22,848 (1,813 away); Referee: Robert Jones

27 October 2018 15	West Bromwich Albion	1–1	Blackburn Rovers	West Bromwich
15:00 BST	Dawson 40'	Report	Reed 71'	Stadium: The Hawthorns; Attendance: 23,820 (1,978 away); Referee: Scott Duncan

3 November 2018 16	Hull City	1–0	West Bromwich Albion	Kingston upon Hull
15:00 GMT	Campbell 38' de Wijs (yellow card) 60'	Report		Stadium: KCOM Stadium; Attendance: 11,916 (1,727 away); Referee: Keith Stroud

10 November 2018 17	West Bromwich Albion	4–1	Leeds United	West Bromwich
17:30 GMT	Robson-Kanu 51'; Phillips 67'; Barnes 82'; Gayle 83'	Report	Hernández 90+2'	Stadium: The Hawthorns; Attendance: 25,661 (2,600 away); Referee: Lee Mason

23 November 2018 18	Ipswich Town	1–2	West Bromwich Albion	Ipswich
19:45 GMT	Jackson 85'	Report	Rodriguez 26'; Barnes 77'	Stadium: Portman Road; Attendance: 22,995 (1,073 away); Referee: Keith Stroud

28 November 2018 19	Swansea City	1–2	West Bromwich Albion	Swansea
19:45 GMT	McBurnie 10'	Report	Dawson 13'; Hegazi 44'	Stadium: Liberty Stadium; Attendance: 17,865 (685 away); Referee: James Linington

3 December 2018 20	West Bromwich Albion	1–1	Brentford	West Bromwich
20:00 GMT	Barnes 77'	Report	Macleod 90+1'	Stadium: The Hawthorns; Attendance: 20,949 (665 away); Referee: Darren Bond

7 December 2018 21	West Bromwich Albion	2–2	Aston Villa	West Bromwich
20:00 GMT	Gayle 28'; Rodriguez 90+1'	Report	El Ghazi 12', 59'	Stadium: The Hawthorns; Attendance: 26,513 (2,600 away); Referee: Darren England

14 December 2018 22	Sheffield United	1–2	West Bromwich Albion	Sheffield
19:45 GMT	McGoldrick 12'	Report	Barry 41'; Gibbs 76'	Stadium: Bramall Lane; Attendance: 23,400 (1,396 away); Referee: Jeremy Simpson

22 December 2018 23	Rotherham United	0–4	West Bromwich Albion	Rotherham
15:00 GMT	Mattock (yellow card) 44'	Report	Gayle 6', 44', 54'; Barnes 20'; Barry (yellow card) 29'; Johnstone (yellow card) 31'	Stadium: New York Stadium; Attendance: 10,593 (2,597 away); Referee: Tony Harrington

26 December 2018 24	West Bromwich Albion	2–0	Wigan Athletic	West Bromwich
15:00 GMT	Rodriguez 8', 69'; Gibbs (yellow card) 57'; Livermore (yellow card) 64'	Report	Connolly (yellow card) 17'; Garner (yellow card) 28'	Stadium: The Hawthorns; Attendance: 25,555 (1,105 away); Referee: Robert Jones

29 December 2018 25	West Bromwich Albion	1–1	Sheffield Wednesday	West Bromwich
15:00 GMT	Rodriguez (red card) 63'; Dawson (yellow card) 89'; Johnstone (yellow card) 90+3'; Jones 90+5' (o.g.)	Report	Nuhiu 5'; Matias (yellow card) 71'; Bannan (yellow card) 82'	Stadium: The Hawthorns; Attendance: 26,548 (2,600 away); Referee: Andy Davies

1 January 2019 26	Blackburn Rovers	2–1	West Bromwich Albion	Blackburn
15:00 GMT	Bennett (yellow card) 52'; Mulgrew 53'; Dack 58'; Brereton (yellow card) 89'; Reed (yellow card) 90+2'	Report	Adarabioyo (yellow card) 41'; Rodriguez 63' (pen.); Dawson (yellow card) 77'; Livermore (red card) 87'; Barry (yellow card) 90+3'	Stadium: Ewood Park; Attendance: 14,258 (1,744 away); Referee: Oliver Langford

12 January 2019 27	West Bromwich Albion	1–1	Norwich City	West Bromwich
15:00 GMT	Gayle 12'; Barry (yellow card) 61'; Rodriguez (yellow card) 62'; Holgate (yellow card) 85'	Report	Tettey (yellow card) 56'; Buendía (yellow card) 62'; Rhodes 83'; Vrančić (yellow card) 90+4'; Krul (yellow card) 90+5'	Stadium: The Hawthorns; Attendance: 26,544 (2,600 away); Referee: Darren England

21 January 2019 28	Bolton Wanderers	0–2	West Bromwich Albion	Bolton
20:00 GMT	Olkowski (yellow card) 38'; Donaldson (yellow card) 45+1'	Report	Rodriguez 19'; Holgate (yellow card) 45+1'; Barry (yellow card) 73'; Field 75'	Stadium: University of Bolton Stadium; Attendance: 14,750 (858 away); Referee: David Webb

2 February 2019 29	West Bromwich Albion	2–3	Middlesbrough	West Bromwich
15:00 GMT	Holgate (yellow card) 39'; Rodriguez 42'; Gayle 63'	Report	Saville 17' (yellow card) 36'; Wing (yellow card) 46'; Shotton (yellow card) 55'; Assombalonga 75', 83'; Hugill (yellow card) 90+6'	Stadium: The Hawthorns; Attendance: 24,863 (1,749 away); Referee: Tim Robinson

9 February 2019 30	Stoke City	0–1	West Bromwich Albion	Stoke-on-Trent
17:30 GMT	Edwards (yellow card) 40'	Report	Gayle 25' (yellow card) 90+1'; Johansen (yellow card) 45'	Stadium: bet365 Stadium; Attendance: 26,828 (2,921 away); Referee: Jeremy Simpson

12 February 2019 31	West Bromwich Albion	2–2	Nottingham Forest	West Bromwich
20:00 GMT	Livermore (yellow card) 40'; Murphy 54'; Rodriguez 89' (pen.); Dawson (yellow card) 90+3'	Report	Johansen 6' (o.g.); Watson (yellow card) 16'; Yates 65'; Milošević (yellow card) 73'	Stadium: The Hawthorns; Attendance: 22,691 (2,205 away); Referee: Lee Mason

16 February 2019 32	Aston Villa	0–2	West Bromwich Albion	Aston
15:00 GMT	Mings (yellow card) 31'; Hause (yellow card) 38'; McGinn (yellow card) 51'	Report	Holgate (yellow card) 29'; Robson-Kanu 41'; Barry (yellow card) 43'; Rodriguez 45'	Stadium: Villa Park; Attendance: 39,263 (2,167 away); Referee: James Linington

19 February 2019 33	Queens Park Rangers	2–3	West Bromwich Albion	Shepherd's Bush
19:45 GMT	Freeman 35'; Hemed 75' (pen.)	Report	Montero 5'; Murphy 61'; Livermore (yellow card) 77' (goal) 90+4'	Stadium: Loftus Road; Attendance: 12,257 (1,492 away); Referee: John Brooks

23 February 2019 34	West Bromwich Albion	0–1	Sheffield United	West Bromwich
17:30 GMT	Dawson (yellow card) 82'; Rodriguez (yellow card) 84'	Report	Dowell 14' (yellow card) 19'; Stevens (yellow card) 80'; Madine (yellow card) 90+5'	Stadium: The Hawthorns; Attendance: 24,928 (2,600 away); Referee: Oliver Langford

1 March 2019 35	Leeds United	4–0	West Bromwich Albion	Leeds
19:45 GMT	Hernández 1'; Bamford 28', 63'; Alioski 90+2'	Report	Barry (yellow card) 50'	Stadium: Elland Road; Attendance: 35,888 (2,357 away); Referee: Tim Robinson

9 March 2019 36	West Bromwich Albion	1–1	Ipswich Town	West Bromwich
15:00 GMT	Johansen 4'; Murphy (yellow card) 70'; Field (yellow card) 87'; Morrison (yellow card) 90'	Report	Knudsen (yellow card) 33'; Edwards (yellow card) 47'; Nolan 48'	Stadium: The Hawthorns; Attendance: 23,973 (1,246 away); Referee: Andy Woolmer

13 March 2019 37	West Bromwich Albion	3–0	Swansea City	West Bromwich
20:00 GMT	Brunt 19'; Holgate 54'; Rodriguez 85'	Report	Celina (penalty missed) 40'	Stadium: The Hawthorns; Attendance: 20,282 (1,103 away); Referee: Scott Duncan

16 March 2019 38	Brentford	0–1	West Bromwich Albion	Brentford
15:00 GMT	Odubajo (yellow card) 58'; Jeanvier (yellow card) 65'	Report	Gayle (yellow card) 33'; Edwards 51'	Stadium: Griffin Park; Attendance: 11,488 (1,598 away); Referee: Andrew Madley

29 March 2019 39	West Bromwich Albion	3–2	Birmingham City	West Bromwich
20:00 GMT	Dawson (yellow card) 30'; Gayle 47'; Rodriguez 65' (pen.); Livermore 74'; Brunt (yellow card) 90+8'	Report	Gardner 7'; Dean (yellow card) 24'; Pedersen (yellow card) 46'; Jutkiewicz 59'; G.Gardner (yellow card) 68'; C.Gardner (yellow card) 84'	Stadium: The Hawthorns; Attendance: 24,789 (2,569 away); Referee: David Webb

6 April 2019 40	Millwall	2–0	West Bromwich Albion	Bermondsey
15:00 BST	Tunnicliffe 30'; Meredith (yellow card) 51'; Cooper (yellow card) 60'; Hegazi 66' (o.g.); Leonard (yellow card) 90'	Report	Johansen (yellow card) 44'; Hegazi (yellow card) 45+2' (yellow-red card) 80'; Rodriguez (penalty missed) 61'; Adarabioyo (yellow card) 67'	Stadium: The Den; Attendance: 15,303 (2,018 away); Referee: James Linington

9 April 2019 41	Bristol City	3–2	West Bromwich Albion	Bristol
19:45 BST	Brownhill 2'; Hunt (yellow card) 13' (goal) 19'; Weimann 16'; Taylor (yellow card) 90+4'	Report	Gayle 47'; Holgate (yellow card) 70'; Rodriguez 74'	Stadium: Ashton Gate Stadium; Attendance: 20,581 (1,621 away); Referee: Simon Hooper

13 April 2019 42	West Bromwich Albion	4–1	Preston North End	West Bromwich
15:00 BST	Gayle 27', 31', 71'; Rodriguez 43'; Livermore (yellow card) 57'; Dawson (yellow card) 90'	Report	Fisher (yellow card) 74'	Stadium: The Hawthorns; Attendance: 25,088 (2,600 away); Referee: Roger East

19 April 2019 43	West Bromwich Albion	3–2	Hull City	West Bromwich
15:00 BST	Gibbs 42'; Gayle 62', 85'	Report	Kane 48', 59'	Stadium: The Hawthorns; Attendance: 23,501 (734 away); Referee: Peter Bankes

22 April 2019 44	Reading	0–0	West Bromwich Albion	Reading
15:00 BST	McCleary (yellow card) 84'; Yiadom (yellow card) 90+4'	Report	Harper (yellow card) 79'	Stadium: Madejski Stadium; Attendance: 17,255 (2,084 away); Referee: Gavin Ward

27 April 2019 45	West Bromwich Albion	2–1	Rotherham United	West Bromwich
15:00 BST	Rodriguez 77' (pen.); Harper 79'	Report	Mattock (yellow card) 37'; Robertson 50'; Jones (yellow card) 66'	Stadium: The Hawthorns; Attendance: 24,534 (904 away); Referee: Robert Jones

5 May 2019 46	Derby County	3–1	West Bromwich Albion	Derby
12:30 BST	Waghorn 19'; Bennett 70'; Wilson 73' (pen.)		Johansen 47'; Robson-Kanu (red card) 90+2'	Stadium: Pride Park; Attendance: 32,055 (3,128 away); Referee: Tim Robinson

==== Play-offs ====
11 May 2019 Semi-final first leg	Aston Villa	2–1	West Bromwich Albion	Aston
12:30 BST	Hourihane 75'; Abraham 79' (pen.)	Report	Gayle 16' (yellow card) 62' (yellow-red card) 88'; Holgate (yellow card) 33'; Hegazi (yellow card) 48'; Gibbs (yellow card) 77'	Stadium: Villa Park; Attendance: 40,754 (2,000 away); Referee: Graham Scott

14 May 2019 Semi-final second leg	West Bromwich Albion	1–0 (a.e.t.) (2–2 agg.) (3–4 p)	Aston Villa	West Bromwich
20:00 BST	Dawson 29'; Johansen (yellow card) 58'; Brunt (yellow card) 66' (yellow-red card) 80'; Morrison (yellow card) 97'	Report	Mings (yellow card) 16'; Taylor (yellow card) 74'	Stadium: The Hawthorns; Attendance: 25,702 (2,000 away); Referee: Chris Kavanagh
	Penalties
	Holgate (penalty missed); Hegazi (penalty missed); Adarabioyo (penalty scored); Gibbs (penalty scored); Morrison (penalty scored)		Hourihane (penalty scored); Jedinak (penalty scored); Grealish (penalty scored); Adomah (penalty missed); Abraham (penalty scored)

=== FA Cup ===
5 January 2019 Third round	West Bromwich Albion	1–0	Wigan Athletic	West Bromwich
12:30 GMT	Sako 31'; Brunt (yellow card) 79'; Field (yellow card) 90+5'	Report	Connolly (yellow card) 29'; Byrne (yellow card) 58'	Stadium: The Hawthorns; Attendance: 15,465 (1,034 away); Referee: Keith Stroud

26 January 2019 Fourth round	Brighton & Hove Albion	0–0	West Bromwich Albion	Falmer
15:00 GMT	Locadia (yellow card) 59'	Report		Stadium: Falmer Stadium; Attendance: 27,001 (3,181 away); Referee: Lee Mason

6 February 2019 Fourth round replay	West Bromwich Albion	1–3 (a.e.t.)	Brighton & Hove Albion	West Bromwich
19:45 GMT	Bartley 77'	Report	Bissouma (yellow card) 81'; Andone 82'; Murray 104', 117'	Stadium: The Hawthorns; Attendance: 8,645 (943 away); Referee: Paul Tierney

=== EFL Cup ===
14 August 2018 First round	West Bromwich Albion	1–0	Luton Town	West Bromwich
20:00 BST	Burke 62'	Report		Stadium: The Hawthorns; Attendance: 10,404 (1,682 away); Referee: Robert Jones

28 August 2018 Second round	West Bromwich Albion	2–1	Mansfield Town	West Bromwich
20:00 BST	Leko 26'; Edwards 75'	Report	Bishop 69'	Stadium: The Hawthorns; Attendance: 10,574 (1,588 away); Referee: Steve Martin

25 September 2018 Third round	West Bromwich Albion	0–3	Crystal Palace	West Bromwich
19:45 BST		Report	Townsend 6', 81'; Van Aanholt 76'	Stadium: The Hawthorns; Attendance: 10,818 (1,663 away); Referee: Peter Bankes

== Transfers ==
=== Transfers in ===
Date from	Position	Nationality	Name	From	Fee	Ref.
3 July 2018	GK	(England)	Sam Johnstone	Manchester United	£6,500,000	
16 July 2018	CB	(England)	Kyle Bartley	(Wales) Swansea City	£4,000,000	
16 July 2018	GK	(England)	Jonathan Bond	Reading	Free transfer	
28 July 2018	LB	(England)	Conor Townsend	Scunthorpe United	Undisclosed	
28 August 2018	RB	(England)	Tyrone Mears	(United States) Minnesota United	Free transfer	
14 September 2018	MF	(Republic of Ireland)	Wes Hoolahan	Norwich City	Free transfer	
2 October 2018	MF	(Mali)	Bakary Sako	Crystal Palace	Free transfer	

=== Transfers out ===
Date from	Position	Nationality	Name	To	Fee	Ref.
1 July 2018	CF	(England)	Tahvon Campbell	Forest Green Rovers	Free transfer	
1 July 2018	CB	(Northern Ireland)	Jonny Evans	Leicester City	£3,500,000	
1 July 2018	CM	(England)	Mylo Hall	Free agent	Released	
1 July 2018	RW	(Wales)	Kieran Holsgrove	Free agent	Released	
1 July 2018	CB	(Northern Ireland)	Gareth McAuley	(Scotland) Rangers	Released	
1 July 2018	LB	(Northern Ireland)	Jack McCourt	(Scotland) Ross County	Released	
1 July 2018	LB	(Republic of Ireland)	Robert McCourt	(Republic of Ireland) Bohemians	Released	
1 July 2018	LM	(England)	Taylor Morrison	Free agent	Released	
1 July 2018	CF	(England)	Evan Pierce	Free agent	Released	
1 July 2018	GK	(England)	Ethan Ross	Colchester United	Free transfer	
1 July 2018	RB	(England)	Aram Soleman	Free agent	Released	
1 July 2018	DM	(Argentina)	Claudio Yacob	Nottingham Forest	Released	
5 July 2018	GK	(England)	Ben Foster	Watford	Undisclosed	
22 July 2018	LW	(Republic of Ireland)	James McClean	Stoke City	£5,000,000	
30 August 2018	LW	(Belgium)	Nacer Chadli	(France) Monaco	£10,000,000	
27 January 2019	LW	(Mali)	Bakary Sako	Crystal Palace	Free transfer	
23 February 2019	CF	(China)	Zhang Yuning	(China) Beijing Sinobo Guoan	Undisclosed	

=== Loans in ===
Start date	Position	Nationality	Name	From	End date	Ref.
24 July 2018	LM	(England)	Harvey Barnes	Leicester City	11 January 2019	
3 August 2018	CB	(England)	Tosin Adarabioyo	Manchester City	31 May 2019	
6 August 2018	CF	(England)	Dwight Gayle	Newcastle United	31 May 2019	
1 January 2019	CB	(England)	Mason Holgate	Everton	31 May 2019	
31 January 2019	CM	(Norway)	Stefan Johansen	Fulham	31 May 2019	
31 January 2019	LW	(Ecuador)	Jefferson Montero	Swansea	31 May 2019	
31 January 2019	RW	(England)	Jacob Murphy	Newcastle United	31 May 2019	

=== Loans out ===
Start date	Position	Nationality	Name	To	End date	Ref.
1 July 2018	CF	(China)	Zhang Yuning	(Netherlands) ADO Den Haag	22 February 2019	
26 July 2018	LB	(England)	Max Melbourne	(Scotland) Partick Thistle	January 2019	
3 August 2018	CB	(England)	Jack Fitzwater	Walsall	3 January 2019	
3 August 2018	RB	(England)	Kane Wilson	Walsall	3 January 2019	
6 August 2018	CF	(Venezuela)	Salomón Rondón	Newcastle United	31 May 2019	
7 August 2018	CB	(Republic of Ireland)	Dara O'Shea	Exeter City	31 May 2019	
9 August 2018	CB	(England)	Kyle Jameson	Barrow	January 2019	
10 August 2018	GK	(England)	Ben Pierce	Redditch United	January 2019	
17 August 2018	RB	(Cameroon)	Allan Nyom	(Spain) Leganés	31 May 2019	
12 October 2018	CM	(Finland)	Alex Bradley	Havant & Waterlooville	November 2018	
26 October 2018	GK	(Wales)	Adam Przyek	Gloucester City	30 November 2018	
14 November 2018	GK	(England)	Alex Palmer	Oldham Athletic	22 November 2018	
5 January 2019	RW	(Scotland)	Oliver Burke	(Scotland) Celtic	31 May 2019	
14 January 2019	RB	(England)	Kane Wilson	Exeter City	31 May 2019	
22 January 2019	DM	(England)	Sam Wilding	Leamington	February 2019	
26 January 2019	RB	(Scotland)	Dan Meredith	Maidstone United	February 2019	
31 January 2019	CM	(Finland)	Alex Bradley	Burton Albion	31 May 2019	
31 January 2019	CB	(England)	Jack Fitzwater	Walsall	31 May 2019	
31 January 2019	CB	(England)	Kyle Howkins	Port Vale	31 May 2019	
12 April 2019	GK	(England)	Alex Palmer	Notts County	19 April 2019	

== Squad statistics ==
As of 16 May 2019

No.	Pos	Nat	Player	Total		Championship		play-offs		FA Cup		League Cup	
No.	Pos	Nat	Player	Apps	Goals	Apps	Goals	Apps	Goals	Apps	Goals	Apps	Goals
1	GK	(England) ENG	Sam Johnstone	48	0	46	0	2	0	0	0	0	0
3	DF	(England) ENG	Kieran Gibbs	38	4	36	4	2	0	0	0	0	0
4	FW	(Wales) WAL	Hal Robson-Kanu	40	4	35	4	0	0	3	0	2	0
5	DF	(England) ENG	Kyle Bartley	34	2	28	1	2	0	3	1	1	0
6	MF	(Norway) NOR	Stefan Johansen	14	2	12	2	2	0	0	0	0	0
7	MF	(Scotland) SCO	James Morrison	24	0	19	0	2	0	1	0	2	0
8	MF	(England) ENG	Jake Livermore	39	2	38	2	0	0	1	0	0	0
10	MF	(Scotland) SCO	Matt Phillips	33	5	30	5	2	0	0	0	1	0
11	MF	(Northern Ireland) NIR	Chris Brunt	35	1	31	1	2	0	1	0	1	0
12	DF	(England) ENG	Tyrone Mears	14	0	9	0	1	0	2	0	2	0
13	GK	(Wales) WAL	Boaz Myhill	3	0	0	0	0	0	0	0	3	0
14	DF	(England) ENG	Conor Townsend	18	0	12	0	0	0	3	0	3	0
15	MF	(Ecuador) ECU	Jefferson Montero	4	1	4	1	0	0	0	0	0	0
16	FW	(England) ENG	Dwight Gayle	42	24	40	23	1	1	0	0	1	0
18	MF	(England) ENG	Gareth Barry	27	1	25	1	0	0	0	0	2	0
19	FW	(England) ENG	Jay Rodriguez	47	22	44	22	2	0	1	0	0	0
20	MF	(England) ENG	Jonathan Leko	7	1	2	0	1	0	2	0	2	1
21	FW	(England) ENG	Kyle Edwards	11	2	6	1	0	0	2	0	3	1
22	MF	(Republic of Ireland) IRL	Wes Hoolahan	10	0	6	0	0	0	3	0	1	0
23	GK	(England) ENG	Jonathan Bond	3	0	0	0	0	0	3	0	0	0
24	DF	(England) ENG	Tosin Adarabioyo	36	0	29	0	1	0	3	0	3	0
25	DF	(England) ENG	Craig Dawson	45	3	41	2	2	1	1	0	1	0
26	DF	(Egypt) EGY	Ahmed Hegazi	43	1	38	1	2	0	1	0	2	0
28	MF	(England) ENG	Sam Field	18	1	12	1	0	0	3	0	3	0
31	MF	(England) ENG	Rayhaan Tulloch	2	0	0	0	0	0	2	0	0	0
34	MF	(England) ENG	Rekeem Harper	23	1	16	1	1	0	3	0	3	0
40	DF	(England) ENG	Kyle Howkins	2	0	0	0	0	0	0	0	2	0
51	MF	(England) ENG	Morgan Rogers	1	0	0	0	0	0	1	0	0	0
68	DF	(England) ENG	Mason Holgate	23	1	19	1	2	0	2	0	0	0
70	MF	(England) ENG	Jacob Murphy	15	2	13	2	2	0	0	0	0	0
Player(s) out on loan
2	DF	(Cameroon) CMR	Allan Nyom	2	0	2	0	0	0	0	0	0	0
Players who left the club during the season
6	MF	(Mali) MLI	Bakary Sako	6	1	5	0	0	0	1	1	0	0
15	MF	(England) ENG	Harvey Barnes	27	9	25	9	0	0	0	0	2	0
17	MF	(Scotland) SCO	Oliver Burke	5	1	3	0	0	0	0	0	2	1

=== Goals record ===
As of 5 May 2019

Rank	No.	Nat.	Po.	Name	Championship	FA Cup	League Cup	Total
1	16	(England)	CF	Dwight Gayle	23	0	0	23
2	19	(England)	CF	Jay Rodriguez	22	0	0	22
3	~~15~~	(England)	AM	Harvey Barnes	9	0	0	9
4	10	(Scotland)	RM	Matt Phillips	5	0	0	5
5	3	(England)	LB	Kieran Gibbs	4	0	0	4
5	4	(Wales)	CF	Hal Robson-Kanu	4	0	0	4
7	5	(England)	CB	Kyle Bartley	1	1	0	2
7	6	(Norway)	CM	Stefan Johansen	2	0	0	2
7	11	(Northern Ireland)	CM	Chris Brunt	2	0	0	2
7	21	(England)	CF	Kyle Edwards	1	0	1	2
7	25	(England)	CB	Craig Dawson	2	0	0	2
7	70	(England)	LM	Jacob Murphy	2	0	0	2
7	8	(England)	CM	Jake Livermore	2	0	0	2
14	~~6~~	(Mali)	CF	Bakary Sako	0	1	0	1
14	17	(Scotland)	RM	Oliver Burke	0	0	1	1
14	15	(Ecuador)	RM	Jefferson Montero	1	0	0	1
14	18	(England)	CM	Gareth Barry	1	0	0	1
14	20	(England)	CM	Jonathan Leko	0	0	1	1
14	26	(Egypt)	CB	Ahmed Hegazi	1	0	0	1
14	28	(England)	CM	Sam Field	1	0	0	1
14	34	(England)	CM	Rakeem Harper	1	0	0	1
14	68	(England)	CB	Mason Holgate	1	0	0	1
Own Goals					2	0	0	2
Total					87	2	3	92

=== Disciplinary record ===
As of 5 May 2019

Rank	No.	Nat.	Po.	Name	Championship			FA Cup			League Cup			Total		
Rank	No.	Nat.	Po.	Name	Booked	(yellow card) (yellow-red card)	Sent off (straight red)	Booked	(yellow card) (yellow-red card)	Sent off (straight red)	Booked	(yellow card) (yellow-red card)	Sent off (straight red)	Booked	(yellow card) (yellow-red card)	Sent off (straight red)
1	8	(England)	CM	Jake Livermore	9	1	1	0	0	0	0	0	0	9	1	1
2	25	(England)	CB	Craig Dawson	10	0	0	0	0	0	0	0	0	10	0	0
3	18	(England)	CM	Gareth Barry	8	0	0	0	0	0	0	0	0	8	0	0
4	1	(England)	GK	Sam Johnstone	6	0	0	0	0	0	0	0	0	6	0	0
4	5	(England)	CB	Kyle Bartley	6	0	0	0	0	0	0	0	0	6	0	0
4	19	(England)	CF	Jay Rodriguez	5	0	1	0	0	0	0	0	0	5	0	1
7	68	(England)	RB	Mason Holgate	5	0	0	0	0	0	0	0	0	5	0	0
8	11	(Northern Ireland)	CM	Chris Brunt	3	0	0	1	0	0	0	0	0	4	0	0
8	26	(Egypt)	CB	Ahmed Hegazi	1	1	0	0	0	0	1	0	0	2	1	0
10	3	(England)	LB	Kieran Gibbs	3	0	0	0	0	0	0	0	0	3	0	0
10	4	(Wales)	CF	Hal Robson-Kanu	2	0	1	0	0	0	0	0	0	2	0	1
10	6	(Norway)	CM	Stefan Johansen	3	0	0	0	0	0	0	0	0	3	0	0
10	16	(England)	CF	Dwight Gayle	2	0	0	0	0	0	1	0	0	3	0	0
10	24	(England)	RB	Tosin Adarabioyo	3	0	0	0	0	0	0	0	0	3	0	0
15	10	(Scotland)	RM	Matt Phillips	2	0	0	0	0	0	0	0	0	2	0	0
15	28	(England)	CM	Sam Field	1	0	0	1	0	0	0	0	0	2	0	0
17	7	(Scotland)	AM	James Morrison	1	0	0	0	0	0	0	0	0	1	0	0
17	11	(Northern Ireland)	CM	Chris Brunt	1	0	0	0	0	0	0	0	0	1	0	0
17	12	(England)	RB	Tyrone Mears	1	0	0	0	0	0	0	0	0	1	0	0
17	14	(England)	LB	Conor Townsend	1	0	0	0	0	0	0	0	0	1	0	0
17	15	(England)	AM	Harvey Barnes	1	0	0	0	0	0	0	0	0	1	0	0
17	21	(England)	CF	Kyle Edwards	0	0	0	0	0	0	1	0	0	1	0	0
17	34	(England)	CM	Rekeem Harper	1	0	0	0	0	0	0	0	0	1	0	0
17	70	(England)	LM	Jacob Murphy	1	0	0	0	0	0	0	0	0	1	0	0
Total					75	2	3	2	0	0	3	0	0	79	2	3
