= Ben Winterbottom =

English footballer (born 2001)

Personal information
- Full name: Benjamin Harry Winterbottom
- Date of birth: 16 July 2001 (age 25)
- Place of birth: Preston, England
- Height: 1.88 m (6 ft 2 in)
- Position: Goalkeeper

Team information
- Current team: Barrow
- Number: 1

Youth career
- Penwortham St Teresa's
- –2019: Blackburn Rovers
- 2019–2021: Liverpool
- 2021–2023: Brentford

Senior career*
Years	Team	Apps	(Gls)
2023–2025	Brentford	0	(0)
2023	→ Welling United (loan)	14	(0)
2024–2025	→ AFC Fylde (loan)	41	(0)
2025–	Barrow	19	(1)
2026	→ Rochdale (loan)	2	(0)
- * Club domestic league appearances and goals as of 14 November 2026

Benjamin Harry Winterbottom (born 16 July 2001) is an English professional footballer who plays as a goalkeeper for National League club Barrow.

Winterbottom played youth football with Blackburn Rovers, Liverpool and Brentford, spending time on loan at non-league clubs Welling United and AFC Fylde, before signing with Barrow.

== Career ==
=== Early career ===
A goalkeeper, Winterbottom began his career in the academy at Blackburn Rovers at U10 level and progressed to sign a two-year scholarship in 2017. When heading into the final months of his scholarship, he transferred to the Liverpool academy in April 2019. Signed as a "training goalkeeper", Winterbottom made two appearances during the U21 team's EFL Trophy campaign. Winterbottom's signed a professional contract in July 2020, but he elected to transfer away from the club in January 2021.

=== Brentford ===
On 29 January 2021, Winterbottom transferred to the B team at Brentford and signed a 2 1/2-year contract, with the option of a further year, for an undisclosed fee. He participated in first team training during the 2021–22 season and was a part of the B team's London Senior Cup-winning squad.

The one-year option on Winterbottom's contract was taken up in June 2023, and on 17 October 2023, he signed a new two-year contract, with the option of a further year.

On 1 August 2023, Winterbottom joined National League South club Welling United on loan, and made 18 appearances prior to its expiration on 31 December 2023. He played the remainder of the 2023–24 season for Brentford B and was promoted into the first team squad in June 2024. Winterbottom played the 2024–25 season on loan at National League club AFC Fylde and made 41 appearances during a campaign which culminated in relegation. He made more saves than any other National League goalkeeper during the season. Winterbottom was released by Brentford when his contract expired in June 2025.

=== Barrow ===
On 20 June 2025, Winterbottom transferred to League Two club Barrow and signed a two-year contract, with the option of a further year, on a free transfer.

On 25 March 2026, he signed a short-term loan deal with National League side Rochdale.

== Career statistics ==
As of match played 29 December 2025

Appearances and goals by club, season and competition
Club	Season	League			FA Cup		EFL Cup		Other		Total	
Club	Season	Division	Apps	Goals	Apps	Goals	Apps	Goals	Apps	Goals	Apps	Goals
Liverpool U21	2019–20	―							2 (Note: Appearances in EFL Trophy)	0	2	0
Brentford	2023–24	Premier League	0	0	0	0	0	0	0	0	0	0
Brentford	2024–25	Premier League	0	0	0	0	0	0	0	0	0	0
Brentford	Total		0	0	0	0	0	0	0	0	0	0
Welling United (loan)	2023–24	National League South	14	0	4	0	―		0	0	18	0
AFC Fylde (loan)	2024–25	National League	41	0	1	0	―		0	0	42	0
Barrow	2025–26	League Two	3	0	0	0	1	0	3	0	7	0
Career total			58	0	5	0	1	0	5	0	69	0

== Honours ==
Brentford B

- London Senior Cup: 2021–22
