= 2025–26 Barrow A.F.C. season =

125th season in existence of Barrow AFC

Barrow
2025–26 season
- Chairman: Paul Hornby
- Head coach: Andy Whing (until 10 December); Paul Gallagher (from 2 January until 11 February); Dino Maamria (from 11 February until 11 March); Sam Foley (interim, from 11 March)
- Stadium: Holker Street
- League Two: 24th (relegated)
- FA Cup: Second round
- EFL Cup: First round
- EFL Trophy: Group stage
- Top goalscorer: League: Josh Gordon (9); All: Josh Gordon (9)
- Highest home attendance: 3,831
- Lowest home attendance: 2,106
- Average home league attendance: 2,773
- Biggest win: 3–1 vs Tranmere Rovers
- Biggest defeat: 0–5 vs Grimsby Town

The 2025–26 season was the 125th season in the history of Barrow and their sixth consecutive season in League Two. In addition to the domestic league, the club also participated in the FA Cup, the EFL Cup, and the EFL Trophy.

== Managerial changes ==
On 10 December, Andy Whing was sacked as the club's head coach, after overseeing forty-six games in charge and a 32.61% win ratio. Neil McDonald was appointed as interim head coach, until a permanent appointment was made. Twenty-three days later, Paul Gallagher was appointed as the new Head Coach on an 18-month deal. However, Paul only lasted five matches in charged before being replaced by Dino Maamria. Then on 11 March, Dino was dismissed and replaced with Sam Foley.

== Transfers and contracts ==
=== In ===
Date	Pos.	Player	From	Fee	Ref.
1 July 2025 (Note: The transfer was announced on 2 June, and would become official on July 1 once his contract at Kilmarock had ended)	CF	(Scotland) Innes Cameron	(Scotland) Kilmarnock	Free	
1 July 2025 (Note: The transfer was announced on 10 June, and would become official on July 1 once his contract at Walsall had ended)	CM	(England) Jack Earing	(England) Walsall	Free	
1 July 2025 (Note: The transfer was announced on 16 June, and would become official on July 1 once his contract at Port Vale had ended)	CM	(England) Rekeem Harper	(England) Port Vale	Free	
1 July 2025 (Note: The transfer was announced on 27 June, and would become official on July 1 once his contract at Oldham had ended)	CB	(England) Charlie Raglan	(England) Oldham Athletic	Free	
1 July 2025 (Note: The transfer was announced on 27 June, and would become official on July 1 once his contract at Norwich had ended)	CB	(England) Lewis Shipley	(England) Norwich City	Free	
1 July 2025 (Note: The transfer was announced on 22 May, and would become official on July 1 once his contract at Wigan had ended)	CM	(Wales) Scott Smith	(England) Wigan Athletic	Free	
1 July 2025 (Note: The transfer was announced on 30 June, and would become official on July 1 once his contract at Lincoln had ended)	CF	(England) Tyler Walker	(England) Lincoln City	Free	
1 July 2025 (Note: The transfer was announced on 20 June, and would become official on July 1 once his contract at Brentford had ended)	GK	(England) Ben Winterbottom	(England) Brentford	Free	
17 July 2025	CM	(England) Regan Booty	(England) Gateshead	Undisclosed	
24 July 2025	CF	(England) Kane Hemmings	(England) Crewe Alexandra	Free	
29 July 2025	RW	(England) Tom Barkhuizen	(England) Derby County	Free	
22 August 2025	CM	(England) Ben Whitfield	(England) Burton Albion	Free	
30 September 2025	DM	(Northern Ireland) Charlie McCann	(England) Forest Green Rovers	Free	
12 January 2026	GK	(Republic of Ireland) Killian Barrett	(England) Sheffield Wednesday	Undisclosed	
15 January 2026	CB	(England) Joe Anderson	(England) Sunderland	Undisclosed	
19 January 2026	CF	(England) Danny Rose	(England) Grimsby Town	Undisclosed	
5 March 2026	CB	(England) Angus MacDonald	(England) Exeter City	Free	

=== Out ===
Date	Pos	Player	To	Fee	Ref.
23 June 2025	CF	(England) Emile Acquah	(Scotland) Dundee	£33,000	
14 January 2026	CM	(England) Regan Booty	(England) Boreham Wood	Undisclosed	

Income: ▲£33,000

=== Loaned in ===
Date	Pos.	Player	From	Date until	Ref.
27 June 2025	RW	(England) Michael Adu-Poku	(England) Watford	16 January 2026 (Note: On 16 January, Adu-Poku's initial season-long loan from Watford was terminated)	
15 August 2025	CF	(England) Rhys Healey	(England) Huddersfield Town	1 January 2026	
15 August 2025	CB	(Scotland) Kerr Smith	(England) Aston Villa	9 January 2026 (Note: On 9 January, Smith's season-long loan from Aston Villa was terminated)	
1 September 2025	CF	(England) Josh Gordon	(England) Walsall	31 May 2026	
8 January 2026	CB	(United States) Freddie Anderson	(England) Stoke City	31 May 2026	
29 January 2026	CF	(England) Jovan Malcolm	(England) Stevenage	31 May 2026	
29 January 2026	CAM	(England) Brandon Powell	(England) Blackburn Rovers	31 May 2026	
30 January 2026	CB	(Wales) Jack Thompson	(England) Nottingham Forest	31 May 2026	

=== Loaned out ===
Date	Pos.	Player	To	Date until	Ref.
26 July 2025	CF	(Sweden) John Shamalo	(England) Bedford Town	2 January 2026	
12 September 2025	CF	(England) Katia Kouyaté	(England) Spennymoor Town	4 December 2025 (Note: On 4 December, Kouyaté was recalled from his loan at Spennymoor)	
17 November 2025	CM	(England) Regan Booty	(England) Boreham Wood	14 January 2026	
13 January 2026	CF	(England) Katia Kouyaté	(England) Warrington Town	8 February 2026	
2 February 2026	CF	(Scotland) Innes Cameron	(Scotland) Raith Rovers	31 May 2026	
25 March 2026	GK	(England) Ben Winterbottom	(England) Rochdale	1 April 2026	

=== Released / Out of Contract ===
Date	Pos.	Player	Subsequent club	Join date	Ref.
30 June 2025	DM	(Scotland) Dean Campbell	(England) Northampton Town	1 July 2025	
30 June 2025	CF	(England) Gerard Garner	(Wales) Newport County	1 July 2025	
30 June 2025	CM	(England) Robbie Gotts	(England) Doncaster Rovers	1 July 2025	
30 June 2025	CM	(England) Kian Spence	(England) Rotherham United	1 July 2025	
30 June 2025	LB	(England) Junior Tiensia	(England) Wealdstone	1 July 2025	
30 June 2025	CF	(England) Dom Telford	(England) Gateshead	25 July 2025	
30 June 2025	LW	(England) Charlie Kirk	(England) Altrincham	29 July 2025	
30 June 2025	GK	(England) Paul Farman	(Wales) Swansea City	8 August 2025	
30 June 2025	CB	(England) Sam Barnes	(England) Altrincham	15 August 2025	
30 June 2025	CB	(Republic of Ireland) Mazeed Ogungbo	(England) Eastbourne Borough	2 September 2025	
30 June 2025	CB	(England) Theo Vassell	(England) Crawley Town	1 January 2026	
14 January 2026	CF	(Sweden) John Shamalo			
22 January 2026	RWB	(England) David Worrall	Retired		

=== New Contract ===
Date	Pos.	Player	Contracted until	Ref.
5 June 2025	RM	(England) David Worrall	30 June 2026	
1 April 2026	CM	(England) Jack Earing	30 June 2027	

== Pre-season and friendlies ==
On 19 May, Barrow announced their first two pre-season friendlies, against Holker Old Boys and Lancaster City. A day later, a third and fourth fixture was added to the schedule, against Tamworth and Bolton Wanderers. A fifth pre-season friendly, against Morecambe was also confirmed. On 5 June, a sixth and final friendly was confirmed, against Rochdale.

Win Draw Loss Fixtures

5 July 2025 Friendly	Holker Old Boys	0–3	Barrow	Barrow-in-Furness
15:00 BST		Report	Shamalo 43'; Fletcher 47', 90'	Stadium: Rakesmoor

8 July 2025 Friendly	Huddersfield Town	1–0	Barrow	Huddersfield
13:00 BST	Ladapo 53'	Report		Stadium: Canalside Training Ground; Attendance: 0 (behind-closed-doors)

12 July 2025 Friendly	Lancaster City	0–2	Barrow	Lancaster
15:00 BST		Report	Cameron 56', 90+4' (pen.)	Stadium: Giant Axe

15 July 2025 Friendly	Barrow	0–1	Bolton Wanderers	Barrow-in-Furness
19:00 BST		Report	Conway 53'	Stadium: Holker Street; Attendance: 1,180

19 July 2025 Friendly	Tamworth	0–2	Barrow	Tamworth
15:00 BST		Report	Cameron 28'; Earing 51'	Stadium: The Lamb Ground

22 July 2025 Friendly	Morecambe	Cancelled	Barrow	Morecambe
13:00 BST				Stadium: Mazuma Mobile Stadium; Attendance: 0 (behind closed doors)
Note: Fixture was cancelled due to ongoing situations at Morecambe Football Club.

26 July 2025 Friendly	Barrow	1–0	Rochdale	Barrow-in-Furness
15:00 BST	Hemmings 88'			Stadium: Holker Street; Attendance: 1,051

== Competitions ==
=== League Two ===
==== League table ====
Pos	Team	Pld	W	D	L	GF	GA	GD	Pts	Promotion, qualification or relegation
20	Newport County	46	12	7	27	48	77	−29	43	
21	Tranmere Rovers	46	10	11	25	54	79	−25	41	
22	Crawley Town	46	8	16	22	44	68	−24	40	
23	Harrogate Town (R)	46	10	9	27	39	68	−29	39	Relegation to National League
24	Barrow (R)	46	9	9	28	45	78	−33	36	Relegation to National League

Source: EFL Official Website
Rules for classification: 1) Points; 2) Goal difference; 3) Number of goals scored; 4) Head-to-head results; 5) Wins; 6) Away goals; 7) Penalty points (sec 9.5); 8) 12-point sending off offences
(R) Relegated

==== Results summary ====
Overall								Home						Away					
Pld	W	D	L	GF	GA	GD	Pts	W	D	L	GF	GA	GD	W	D	L	GF	GA	GD
46	9	9	28	45	68	−23	36	5	4	14	18	24	−6	4	5	14	27	44	−17

Source: Soccerway

==== Results by round ====
Round	1	2	3	4	5	6	7	8	9	10	11	12	13	14	15	16	17	18	19	20	21	22	23	24	27	28	30	31	26^{2}	32	33	34	35	36	25^{1}	37	38	39	40	41	42	43	29^{3}	44	45	46
Ground	A	H	H	A	A	H	H	A	H	A	H	A	A	H	H	A	H	A	H	A	H	A	A	H	A	H	A	A	A	H	H	A	H	A	H	H	A	A	H	A	H	A	H	H	A	H
Result	L	L	W	L	W	L	L	L	W	W	D	D	W	D	D	L	L	D	L	D	L	L	W	L	L	L	L	L	L	W	L	L	L	D	L	D	L	L	W	D	L	L	W	L	L	L
Position	19	21	16	19	14	18	19	21	19	17	17	18	15	15	15	17	17	18	18	18	19	19	19	19	19	19	21	21	22	20	20	22	22	22	22	23	23	23	21	22	22	23	23	23	24	24
Points	0	0	3	3	6	6	6	6	9	12	13	14	17	18	19	19	19	20	20	21	21	21	24	24	24	24	24	24	24	27	27	27	27	28	28	29	29	29	32	33	33	33	36	36	36	36

Source: EFL
A = Away; H = Home; W = Win; D = Draw; L = Loss; P = Postponed
Notes:
- ^{1} Matchday 25 (vs. Bristol Rovers) was postponed due to a frozen pitch.
- ^{2} Matchday 26 (vs. Shrewsbury Town) was rearranged due to their FA Cup progression.
- ^{3} Matchday 29 (vs. Oldham Athletic) was postponed due to a waterlogged pitch.

==== Matches ====
On 26 June, the League Two fixtures were announced, with Barrow away to Chesterfield on the opening day.

Win Draw Loss Fixtures

2 August 2025 1	Chesterfield	1–0	Barrow	Chesterfield
15:00 BST	Markanday 45'; Naylor (yellow card) 66'	Report	Smith (yellow card) 17'	Stadium: SMH Group Stadium; Attendance: 8,223; Referee: Alan Young

9 August 2025 2	Barrow	0–2	Milton Keynes Dons	Barrow-in-Furness
15:00 BST	Jackson (yellow card) 35'; Barkhuizen (yellow card) 58'; Fletcher (yellow card) 63'	Report	Mendez-Laing (yellow card) 26'; Jones (yellow card) 56'; Gilbey 73'; Paterson 81'	Stadium: Holker Street; Attendance: 3,218; Referee: Michael Barlow

16 August 2025 3	Barrow	2–1	Notts County	Barrow-in-Furness
15:00 BST	Walker 32'; Canavan (yellow card) 82'; Shipley 90+7'	Report	Dennis 89'; Bedeau (yellow card) 90+2'	Stadium: Holker Street; Attendance: 3,285; Referee: Paul Marsden

19 August 2025 4	Harrogate Town	1–0	Barrow	Harrogate
19:45 BST	McCoulsky 29'	Report		Stadium: Wetherby Road; Attendance: 3,003; Referee: Jamie O'Connor

23 August 2025 5	Colchester United	0–2	Barrow	Colchester
15:00 BST	Payne (yellow card) 14'; Lisbie (yellow card) 90+1'	Report	Earing 9'; Booty (yellow card) 14'; Raglan (yellow card) 45'; Barkhuizen (yellow card) 71'; Shipley 72'	Stadium: Colchester Community Stadium; Attendance: 4,512; Referee: Aaron Bannister

30 August 2025 6	Barrow	0–1	Fleetwood Town	Barrow-in-Furness
12:30 BST	Canavan (red card) 10'; Barkhuizen (yellow card) 26'; Smith (yellow card) 49'	Report	Graydon 37'; Bonds (yellow card) 66'; Neal (yellow card) 90'; Norwood (yellow card) 90+5'	Stadium: Holker Street; Attendance: 3,325; Referee: Martin Woods
Note: Fixture was originally scheduled for a 15:00 kick-off, but was moved for live Sky Sports broadcasting.

6 September 2025 7	Barrow	1–3	Swindon Town	Barrow-in-Furness
15:00 BST	Smith (yellow card) 49'; Shipley 80'	Report	Drinan 2'; Nichols (yellow card) 16'; Oldaker (yellow card) 26'; Glatzel 36'; Ehibhatiomhan 77'; Kilkenny (yellow card) 85'	Stadium: Holker Street; Attendance: 3,077; Referee: Seb Stockbridge

13 September 2025 8	Bristol Rovers	2–1	Barrow	Bristol
15:00 BST	McEachran 16'; Cavegn 28'; Southam-Hales (yellow card) 90+1'; Sparkes (yellow card) 90+5'	Report	Raglan (yellow card) 63'; Mahoney 69'; Fletcher (yellow card) 86'; Booty (yellow card) 89'	Stadium: Memorial Stadium; Attendance: 7,267; Referee: Sam Allison

20 September 2025 9	Barrow	1–0	Crewe Alexandra	Barrow-in-Furness
15:00 BST	Gordon (yellow card) 56'; Fletcher 58'; Stanway (yellow card) 90'	Report	Hutchinson (yellow card) 28'; Thomas (yellow card) 82'	Stadium: Holker Street; Attendance: 3,177 (389 away); Referee: Scott Oldham

27 September 2025 10	Crawley Town	1–2	Barrow	Crawley
15:00 BST	Pereira (yellow card) 51'; Loft (yellow card) 56'; Bajrami 65'; Holohan (yellow card) 90+7'	Report	Gordon 36'; Fletcher 45+6'; Walker (yellow card) 90'; Newby (yellow card) 90+3'; Stanway (yellow card) 90+7'	Stadium: Broadfield Stadium; Attendance: 2,889; Referee: Matthew Corlett

4 October 2025 11	Barrow	0–0	Shrewsbury Town	Barrow-in-Furness
15:00 BST	Gordon (yellow card) 74'; Fletcher (yellow card) 90+1'	Report	Kabia (yellow card) 90+3'; Aneke (yellow card) 90+6'	Stadium: Holker Street; Attendance: 3,047; Referee: Ross Martin

11 October 2025 12	Oldham Athletic	0–0	Barrow	Oldham
17:30 BST	Garner (yellow card) 90'	Report	Gordon (yellow card) 75'	Stadium: Boundary Park; Attendance: 7,170; Referee: Rob Massey-Ellis
Note: Fixture was originally scheduled for a 15:00 kick-off, but was rescheduled for live Sky Sports broadcasting.

18 October 2025 13	Walsall	1–2	Barrow	Walsall
15:00 BST	Clarke (yellow card) 70'; Kanu 74'	Report	Shipley (yellow card) 23' (yellow-red card) 56'; Newby 31'; Mahoney (yellow card) 39'; McCann 68'; Harper (yellow card) 90+2'	Stadium: Bescot Stadium; Attendance: 7,763; Referee: Benjamin Speedie

25 October 2025 14	Barrow	2–2	Barnet	Barrow-in-Furness
15:00 BST	Gordon 10'; Williams (red card) 39'; Whitfield (yellow card) 49'; Smith (yellow card) 59'; Tavares 68' (o.g.)	Report	Stead 51'; Senior 60'; Ndlovu (yellow card) 72'	Stadium: Holker Street; Attendance: 2,919; Referee: Declan Brown

8 November 2025 15	Barrow	2–2	Grimsby Town	Barrow-in-Furness
15:00 GMT	Harper 44'; Hemmings (yellow card) 62'; Gordon (yellow card) 68'; McCann 74'; Newby (yellow card) 90+4'	Report	Rose 7'; Green 13', (yellow card) 80'	Stadium: Holker Street; Attendance: 3,159; Referee: Jamie O'Connor

15 November 2025 16	Bromley	2–1	Barrow	Bromley
15:00 GMT	Ifill 32'; Whitely (yellow card) 45'; Kabamba 88'	Report	Whitfield 50'; Raglan (yellow card) 72'; Canavan (yellow card) 78'	Stadium: Hayes Lane; Attendance: 3,903; Referee: Stephen Parkinson

22 November 2025 17	Barrow	0–2	Cambridge United	Barrow-in-Furness
15:00 GMT	Gordon (yellow card) 85'	Report	Smith (yellow card) 37'; Ruddock Mpanzu 49', 90+1', (yellow card) 90'	Stadium: Holker Street; Attendance: 3,024; Referee: Scott Oldham

29 November 2025 18	Newport County	2–2	Barrow	Newport
15:00 GMT	Glennon 39'; Baker-Richardson 63'	Report	Whitfield 45'; Smith (yellow card) 82', (goal) 84'	Stadium: Rodney Parade; Attendance: 3,624; Referee: Carl Brook

9 December 2025 19	Barrow	0–3	Tranmere Rovers	Barrow-in-Furness
19:45 GMT	Williams (yellow card) 20'; Gordon (yellow card) 51'; Canavan (yellow card) 52', (red card) 84'; McCann (yellow card) 84'	Report	Whitaker 53'; Ironside 67' (pen.); Dennis (yellow card) 72', (goal) 86' (pen.)	Stadium: Holker Street; Attendance: 2,106; Referee: Andrew Miller

13 December 2025 20	Gillingham	2–2	Barrow	Gillingham
15:00 GMT	Earing 25' (o.g.); Rowe 28'		Gordon 57' 83'; Hemmings (yellow card) 86'	Stadium: Priestfield Stadium; Attendance: 5,500; Referee: Farai Hallam

19 December 2025 21	Barrow	1–2	Cheltenham Town	Barrow-in-Furness
19:45 GMT	Whitfield 47'		Adelakun 39'; Archer 84'	Stadium: Holker Street; Attendance: 2,140; Referee: Thomas Parsons
Note: Fixture was originally scheduled for 20 December, but was moved to the night before following both clubs agreement.

26 December 2025 22	Accrington Stanley	2–1	Barrow	Accrington
15:00 GMT	Ward 30'; Woods 90'	Report	Gordon (yellow card) 36'; McCann 41', (yellow card) 57'	Stadium: Crown Ground; Attendance: 2,980; Referee: Scott Jackson

29 December 2025 23	Tranmere Rovers	1–3	Barrow	Birkenhead
19:45 GMT	Turnbull (yellow card) 40'; Brough 50'; Smith (yellow card) 84'	Report	Canavan (yellow card) 4' (yellow-red card) 64'; Jackson 8'; Raglan 18'; Fletcher 32'; Harper (yellow card) 35'; Smith (yellow card) 90+7'	Stadium: Prenton Park; Attendance: 6,706; Referee: Elliott Swallow

1 January 2026 24	Barrow	1–2	Salford City	Barrow-in-Furness
15:00 GMT	Fletcher 20'; Williams (yellow card) 57'; Raglan (yellow card) 80'	Report	Udoh 11'; Oluwo (yellow card) 15'; N'Mai 83'	Stadium: Holker Street; Attendance: 2,752; Referee: Adam Herczeg

17 January 2026 27	Crewe Alexandra	3–1	Barrow	Crewe
15:00 GMT	Sanders (yellow card) 10'; O'Reilly 13'; Agius 17', (yellow card) 90+6'; March 38'; Demetriou (yellow card) 40'; Hutchinson (yellow card) 48'	Report	Jackson (yellow card) 18'; Fletcher 31'; Anderson (yellow card) 65'; Smith (yellow card) 65'	Stadium: Gresty Road; Attendance: 4,770; Referee: Seb Stockbrige

24 January 2026 28	Barrow	0–1	Crawley Town	Barrow-in-Furness
15:00 GMT	Anderson (yellow card) 65'; McCann (yellow card) 88'	Report	Richards 89'	Stadium: Holker Street; Attendance: 2,322; Referee: David Webb

31 January 2026 30	Swindon Town	3–1	Barrow	Swindon
15:00 GMT	Palmer 20'; Nichols (yellow card) 31'; Drinan 77', 87'	Report	Rose 10'; Smith (yellow card) 38'	Stadium: County Ground; Attendance: 7,596; Referee: Oliver Yates

7 February 2026 31	Notts County	2–1	Barrow	Nottingham
15:00 GMT	Smith 16' (o.g.); Iorpenda (yellow card) 43'; Dennis 58'		Smith (yellow card) 19'; McCann 30'; Rose (yellow card) 38'; Anderson (yellow card) 86'	Stadium: Meadow Lane; Attendance: 9,581; Referee: Michael Barlow

10 February 2026 26	Shrewsbury Town	2–1	Barrow	Shrewsbury
19:45 GMT	Scully 47'; Hoole 54'; Benning (yellow card) 80'; Lloyd (yellow card) 89'		Newby (yellow card) 57'; Walker 75'	Stadium: New Meadow; Attendance: 4,116; Referee: Matthew Corlett
Note: Fixture was initially scheduled for 10 January, but was rearranged due to Shrewsbury's FA Cup progression.

14 February 2026 32	Barrow	1–0	Colchester United	Barrow-in-Furness
15:00 GMT	Canavan (yellow card) 49', (goal) 85'; Thompson (yellow card) 69'		Tovide (yellow card) 30'; Araujo (yellow card) 90+4'; Vincent-Young (yellow card) 90+4'	Stadium: Holker Street; Attendance: 2,321; Referee: Peter Wright

17 February 2026 33	Barrow	0–1	Harrogate Town	Barrow-in-Furness
19:45 GMT	Thompson (yellow card) 90+8'	Report	Taylor 7'; Headman (yellow card) 66'; Heffernan (yellow card) 88'	Stadium: Holker Street; Attendance: 2,386; Referee: Steven Copeland

21 February 2026 34	Fleetwood Town	3–2	Barrow	Fleetwood
12:30 GMT	Lynch (yellow card) 11'; Osong 64'; Evans (yellow card) 73'; McLean 89'; Stanway 90+4'	Report	Gordon 12' (pen.), (yellow card) 86'; Canavan 34'; Harper (yellow card) 45+2'; Jackson (yellow card) 90+2'	Stadium: Highbury Stadium; Attendance: 2,943; Referee: Elliot Bell
Note: Fixture was initially scheduled for a 15:00 kick-off, but was rescheduled for live Sky Sports broadcasting.

28 February 2026 35	Barrow	0–1	Gillingham	Barrow-in-Furness
15:00 GMT		Report	McKenzie 90+13'	Stadium: Holker Street; Attendance: 2,331 (237 Gillingham supporters); Referee: Ross Joyce

6 March 2026 36	Cheltenham Town	2–2	Barrow	Cheltenham
19:45 GMT	Davison 15'; Cundy (yellow card) 24'; Hutchinson 90'		Fletcher 39', (yellow card) 85'; Gordon (penalty missed) 59', 59'; Rose (yellow card) 82'	Stadium: Whaddon Road; Attendance: 3,753; Referee: Kirsty Dowle
Note: Fixture was initially scheduled for 7 March, but was moved to the night before following both clubs agreement.

10 March 2026 25	Barrow	0–2	Bristol Rovers	Barrow-in-Furness
19:45 GMT	MacDonald (yellow card) 64'	Report	Leigh 27'; Cavegn 56'	Stadium: Holker Street; Attendance: 2,300; Referee: Tom Reeves
Note: Fixture was originally scheduled for 4 January, but it was postponed due to a frozen pitch.

14 March 2026 37	Barrow	0–0	Accrington Stanley	Barrow-in-Furness
15:00 GMT	Shipley (yellow card) 30'; McCann (yellow card) 31'	Report	Butterfield (yellow card) 40'; Woods (yellow card) 72'; Martin (yellow card) 90+3'	Stadium: Holker Street; Attendance: 2,417; Referee: Martin Coy

17 March 2026 38	Salford City	3–1	Barrow	Salford
19:45 GMT	Graydon 20'; Borini 69', 83'; Butcher (yellow card) 86'	Report	Gordon (yellow card) 52'; Rose 77'	Stadium: Moor Lane; Attendance: 1,894; Referee: Isaac Searle

21 March 2026 39	Grimsby Town	5–0	Barrow	Cleethorpes
15:00 GMT	Cook 17'; Green 41', 87'; Kabia 61', 90+10'	Report		Stadium: Blundell Park; Attendance: 7,132; Referee: Ben Speedie

28 March 2026 40	Barrow	2–1	Bromley	Barrow-in-Furness
15:00 GMT	Harper (yellow card) 34'; Rose (yellow card) 45'; Gordon 56'; Rose 67'; Canavan (yellow card) 90+6'	Report	Hondermarck (yellow card) 19'; Charles 35'; Whitely (yellow card) 61'; Arthurs (yellow card) 77'	Stadium: Holker Street; Attendance: 2,303; Referee: Robert Madley

3 April 2026 41	Milton Keynes Dons	0–0	Barrow	Milton Keynes
15:00 BST	Sanders (yellow card) 72'; Crowley (yellow card) 86'	Report	Williams (yellow card) 34'; Jackson (yellow card) 76'; Shipley (yellow card) 85'	Stadium: Stadium MK; Attendance: 7,503; Referee: Martin Woods

6 April 2026 42	Barrow	0–1	Chesterfield	Barrow-in-Furness
15:00 BST	Rose (yellow card) 58'; McCann (yellow card) 89'	Report	Curtis (yellow card) 18'; McFadzean (yellow card) 45+2'; Berry 62'	Stadium: Holker Street; Attendance: 2,956; Referee: Darren Drysdale

11 April 2026 43	Barnet	3–2	Barrow	Edgware
15:00 BST	Tshimanga 45+2'; Shelton 53'; Kanu (yellow card) 60'; Stead 84'	Report	Gordon 3'; Williams (yellow card) 10'; Harper 73'	Stadium: The Hive Stadium; Attendance: 2,075; Referee: Simon Mather

14 April 2026 29	Barrow	3–2	Oldham Athletic	Barrow-in-Furness
19:45 BST	Smith (yellow card) 11'; MacDonald (yellow card) 22'; Gordon (yellow card) 61'; Gordon 82'; Rose 83'; Fletcher 90+1'	Report	Payne 49'; Simeu (yellow card) 53'; Pett 88'	Stadium: Holker Street; Attendance: 2,617; Referee: Edward Duckworth
Note: Fixture was originally scheduled for 27 January, but it was postponed due to a waterlogged pitch.

18 April 2026 44	Barrow	1–3	Walsall	Barrow-in-Furness
12:30 BST	Anderson (yellow card) 67'; Malcolm 88'	Report	Adomah 33'; Hancock 45+2', 68'	Stadium: Holker Street; Attendance: 3,831; Referee: Scott Oldham
Note: Fixture was initially scheduled for a 15:00 kick-off, but was brought forward for live Sky Sports broadcasting.

25 April 2026 45	Cambridge United	3–0	Barrow	Cambridge
15:00 BST	Knight 34'; Gibbons 57'; Stanway 74' (o.g.)	Report		Stadium: Abbey Stadium; Attendance: 7,512; Referee: Stephen Parkinson

2 May 2026 46	Barrow	1–2	Newport County	Barrow-in-Furness
15:00 BST	McCann 9'	Report	Davies 76'; Kamwa 83'	Stadium: Holker Street; Attendance: 3,588; Referee: Jacob Miles

=== FA Cup ===
Barrow were drawn away to Spennymoor Town in the first round and to Wigan Athletic in the second round.

Win Draw Loss Fixtures

1 November 2025 First round	Spennymoor Town	0–2	Barrow	Spennymoor
15:00 GMT	Dolan (yellow card) 27'; McKeown (yellow card) 90+3'	Report	McCann (yellow card) 30'; Harper (yellow card) 33'; Newby 40'; Jackson (yellow card) 48'; Fletcher (yellow card) 65'; Hemmings 72'; Shipley (yellow card) 80'	Stadium: The Brewery Field; Attendance: 2,283; Referee: Zac Kennard-Kettle

6 December 2025 Second round	Wigan Athletic	2–2 (a.e.t.) (4–3 p)	Barrow	Wigan
15:00 GMT	Carragher 13'; Murray (yellow card) 84'; Aimson 89'	Report	McCann (yellow card) 37'; Earing 65'; Canavan 85'; Williams (yellow card) 95'	Stadium: Brick Community Stadium; Attendance: 4,623; Referee: Martin Coy
	Penalties
	McManaman (penalty scored); Murray (penalty scored); Aimson (penalty scored); Saydee (penalty scored)		McCann (penalty scored); Newby (penalty scored); Jackson (penalty missed); Gordon (penalty scored); Williams (penalty missed)

=== EFL Cup ===
Barrow were drawn at home to Preston North End in the first round.

Win Draw Loss Fixtures

12 August 2025 First round	Barrow	0–1	Preston North End	Barrow-in-Furness
19:30 BST	Newby (yellow card) 81'	Report	Raglan 66' (o.g.)	Stadium: Holker Street; Attendance: 3,108; Referee: Ross Joyce

=== EFL Trophy ===
Barrow were drawn against Blackpool, Tranmere Rovers and Nottingham Forest U21 in the group stage.

Pos	Div	Team	Pld	W	PW	PL	L	GF	GA	GD	Pts	Qualification
1	L2	Tranmere Rovers	3	2	1	0	0	6	4	+2	8	Advance to Round 2
2	L1	Blackpool	3	2	0	0	1	8	3	+5	6	Advance to Round 2
3	L2	Barrow	3	1	0	0	2	3	7	−4	3	
4	ACA	Nottingham Forest U21	3	0	0	1	2	3	6	−3	1	

Source: EFL

Win Draw Loss Fixtures

16 September 2025 Nor. Group B	Blackpool	5–0	Barrow	Blackpool
19:00 BST	Banks 7', 77'; Fletcher 12'; Lyons 49'; Taylor 73'	Report	Shipley (yellow card) 84'	Stadium: Bloomfield Road; Referee: Garreth Rhodes

7 October 2025 Nor. Group B	Barrow	1–2	Tranmere Rovers	Barrow-in-Furness
19:30 BST	Newby 8'; Booty (yellow card) 45+1'; Harper (yellow card) 58'; Cameron (yellow card) 60'	Report	Whitaker 22', 80'; Brough (yellow card) 72'	Stadium: Holker Street; Attendance: 581; Referee: William Davis

28 October 2025 Nor. Group B	Barrow	2–0	Nottingham Forest U21	Barrow-in-Furness
19:30 GMT	Worrall 61'; Cameron 90+1'	Report	Berry (yellow card) 72'	Stadium: Holker Street; Attendance: 441; Referee: Thomas Parsons

== Statistics ==
=== Appearances and goals ===
As of match played 14 April 2026

Players with no appearances are not included on the list; italics indicate a loaned in player.

No.	Pos	Nat	Player	Total		League Two		FA Cup		EFL Cup		EFL Trophy	
No.	Pos	Nat	Player	Apps	Goals	Apps	Goals	Apps	Goals	Apps	Goals	Apps	Goals
1	GK	(England) ENG	Wyll Stanway	43	0	40+1	0	2	0	0	0	0	0
2	DF	(England) ENG	Angus MacDonald	10	0	10	0	0	0	0	0	0	0
3	DF	(England) ENG	Lewis Shipley	31	3	23+2	3	1+1	0	1	0	3	0
4	MF	(Wales) WAL	MJ Williams	25	0	20+2	0	1	0	0	0	2	0
5	DF	(England) ENG	Charlie Raglan	34	1	30+1	1	2	0	1	0	0	0
6	DF	(Republic of Ireland) IRL	Niall Canavan	29	3	26+1	2	1	1	1	0	0	0
7	DF	(England) ENG	Ben Jackson	45	1	37+3	1	2	0	1	0	2	0
8	MF	(Wales) WAL	Scott Smith	31	1	17+9	1	1	0	1	0	3	0
10	FW	(England) ENG	Tyler Walker	24	2	8+13	2	0	0	1	0	2	0
11	MF	(England) ENG	Elliot Newby	43	3	23+14	1	1+1	1	0+1	0	1+2	1
14	MF	(Northern Ireland) NIR	Charlie McCann	35	4	27+4	4	2	0	0	0	1+1	0
15	FW	(England) ENG	Kane Hemmings	13	1	6+5	0	0+1	1	0	0	1	0
16	MF	(Republic of Ireland) IRL	Sam Foley	7	0	2+5	0	0	0	0	0	0	0
18	FW	(Scotland) SCO	Innes Cameron	18	1	3+11	0	0	0	0+1	0	2+1	1
19	FW	(England) ENG	Jovan Malcolm	10	0	3+7	0	0	0	0	0	0	0
20	MF	(England) ENG	Isaac Fletcher	32	7	15+13	7	1+1	0	0	0	1+1	0
21	MF	(England) ENG	Jack Earing	33	2	23+8	1	1	1	1	0	0	0
22	DF	(England) ENG	Joe Anderson	10	0	8+2	0	0	0	0	0	0	0
23	FW	(England) ENG	Connor Mahoney	39	1	18+17	1	1	0	1	0	1+1	0
24	DF	(United States) USA	Freddie Anderson	4	0	4	0	0	0	0	0	0	0
25	FW	(England) ENG	Josh Gordon	31	9	27+2	9	2	0	0	0	0	0
26	DF	(Wales) WAL	Jack Thompson	9	0	7+2	0	0	0	0	0	0	0
28	MF	(England) ENG	Brandon Powell	3	0	3	0	0	0	0	0	0	0
29	FW	(England) ENG	Tom Barkhuizen	35	0	24+8	0	1	0	0+1	0	1	0
31	GK	(England) ENG	Ben Winterbottom	7	0	3	0	0	0	1	0	3	0
33	FW	(England) ENG	Danny Rose	18	4	15+3	4	0	0	0	0	0	0
34	MF	(England) ENG	Ben Whitfield	29	3	17+7	3	2+0	0	0	0	2+1	0
45	MF	(England) ENG	Rekeem Harper	32	2	25+5	2	1	0	0	0	1	0
Players who featured but departed the club during the season:
9	FW	(England) ENG	Rhys Healey	1	0	0+1	0	0	0	0	0	0	0
19	FW	(England) ENG	Michael Adu-Poku	8	0	0+4	0	0+2	0	0	0	1+1	0
22	MF	(England) ENG	Regan Booty	14	0	8+2	0	0	0	1	0	3	0
27	MF	(England) ENG	David Worrall	9	1	1+4	0	0	0	1+0	0	2+1	1
43	DF	(Scotland) SCO	Kerr Smith	3	0	0+2	0	0	0	0	0	1	0
