= Aston Manor Academy =

Location
- Philips Street, Aston; Birmingham, West Midlands, B6 4PZ; England; 52°29′46″N 1°53′25″W

Information
- Type: Academy
- Motto: All Different, All Equal, All Achieving
- Established: 1969
- Local authority: Birmingham City Council
- Department for Education URN: 136882 Tables
- Ofsted: Reports
- Headteacher: Jill Sweeney
- Gender: Mixed
- Age: 11 to 18
- Enrolment: 930
- Houses: Cadbury Chamberlain and Bolton
- Colour
- Website: http://www.astonmanor.bham.sch.uk

Aston Manor Academy (formerly Aston Manor School) is a coeducational secondary school and sixth form with academy status, located in the Aston area of Birmingham, England.

Due in part to the fact that it is situated in Aston, it has children from a wide variety of ethnic groups. As of February 2013 the highest proportion of children at the school are of Bangladeshi origin at 33%, with Pakistani at 18%, Black Somali at 13%, Black Caribbean at 11%, Black African at 6% and White British at 3%. A very high proportion do not speak English as their first language.

In addition to having Technology College status, the academy has gained a range of awards and accreditations, including Applied Learning, School Achievement, Healthy Schools and International School awards. In May 2011, the academy gained the Naace Information and Communications Technology (ICT) Mark.

== History ==
In 1973 the school was used by John Jesnor Lindsay for shooting several pornographic films, having cast the caretaker in the film in exchange for access. Use of the school was not known to the headmaster until notified by the police.

== Alumni ==
- Saido Berahino, professional footballer
- Rekeem Harper, professional footballer
- Leon Edwards, professional Mixed Martial Artist, former UFC Welterweight Champion
- Recordo Gordon, cricketer
- Ateeq Javid, cricketer
