= Sam Johnstone =

English footballer (born 1993)

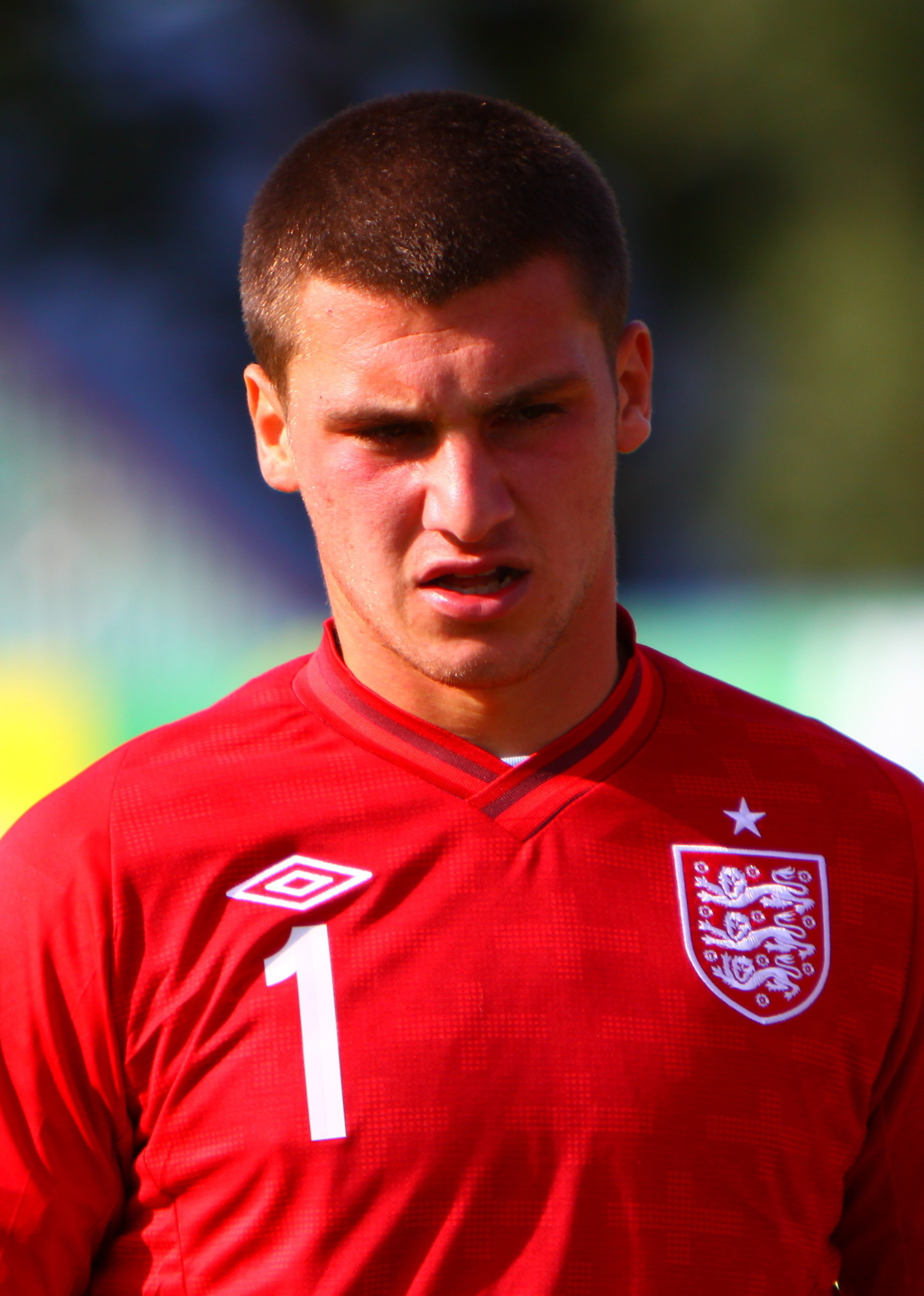
- Johnstone playing for England U19 in 2012

Personal information
- Full name: Samuel Luke Johnstone
- Date of birth: 25 March 1993 (age 33)
- Place of birth: Preston, England
- Height: 6 ft 4 in (1.93 m)
- Position: Goalkeeper

Team information
- Current team: Celtic (on loan from Wolverhampton Wanderers)
- Number: 26

Youth career
- Euxton Villa
- –2011: Manchester United

Senior career*
Years	Team	Apps	(Gls)
2011–2018	Manchester United	0	(0)
2011	→ Oldham Athletic (loan)	0	(0)
2011–2012	→ Scunthorpe United (loan)	12	(0)
2013	→ Walsall (loan)	7	(0)
2013	→ Yeovil Town (loan)	1	(0)
2014	→ Doncaster Rovers (loan)	18	(0)
2014–2015	→ Doncaster Rovers (loan)	10	(0)
2015	→ Preston North End (loan)	22	(0)
2016	→ Preston North End (loan)	4	(0)
2017	→ Aston Villa (loan)	21	(0)
2017–2018	→ Aston Villa (loan)	45	(0)
2018–2022	West Bromwich Albion	165	(0)
2022–2024	Crystal Palace	29	(0)
2024–	Wolverhampton Wanderers	19	(0)
2026–	→ Celtic (loan)	5	(0)

International career^{‡}
2008	England U16	1	(0)
2009–2010	England U17	14	(0)
2010–2012	England U19	13	(0)
2013	England U20	3	(0)
2021–2023	England	4	(0)
Medal record
Men's football
Representing England
UEFA European Under-17 Championship
Winner	2010 Liechtenstein
UEFA European Championship
Runner-up	2020 Europe
- * Club domestic league appearances and goals as of 23:49, 13 December 2025 (UTC) ‡ National team caps and goals as of 22:45, 13 October 2023 (UTC)

Samuel Luke Johnstone (born 25 March 1993) is an English professional footballer who plays as goalkeeper for Scottish Premiership Celtic, on loan from EFL Championship club Wolverhampton Wanderers.

A product of the Manchester United academy, Johnstone spent time on loan with Oldham Athletic, Scunthorpe United, Walsall, Yeovil Town, Doncaster Rovers, Preston North End and Aston Villa, before his transfer to West Bromwich Albion in 2018. He was an England youth international, winning caps at under-16, under-17, under-19 and under-20 levels.

== Early life ==
Samuel Luke Johnstone was born on 25 March 1993 in Preston, Lancashire. His father is Glenn Johnstone, a former professional footballer. Johnstone's younger brother, Max, joined Manchester United as a youth-team player in September 2016.

== Club career ==
=== Manchester United ===
==== Early career ====
Johnstone joined Manchester United at academy level from Chorley-based club Euxton Villa, after being spotted by club scout Colin Fairhurst. In the 2010–11 season, he was first-choice goalkeeper in the academy, after sharing the duties the previous season.

On 26 July 2011, Johnstone joined League One club Oldham Athletic on loan, as both of their first-choice goalkeepers were sidelined by injury. On 9 September, Johnstone joined League One club Scunthorpe United on a one-month loan after their first-choice goalkeeper Josh Lillis suffered a long-term injury. The following day, he made his debut in a 1–1 home draw against Sheffield United. On 19 October, Johnstone dislocated his finger during a training session, forcing Scunthorpe to search for an emergency goalkeeper once again. On 10 November, Scunthorpe extended the loan until 9 December, which was then extended to 10 January 2012.

On 20 March 2013, Manchester United agreed for Johnstone to spend the rest of the 2012–13 season on loan to League One club Walsall. He kept consecutive clean sheets in his first few matches and was first-choice goalkeeper during his loan. On 17 August, Johnstone was loaned to Championship club Yeovil Town for a period of three months. Johnstone made his debut on the same day in a 2–0 loss to Burnley, but it was later confirmed that he had suffered a finger injury prior to his debut and returned to Manchester United for treatment.

==== 2014–2017 ====
On 31 January 2014, Johnstone was loaned to Championship club Doncaster Rovers for four weeks. With the first-choice goalkeeper Ross Turnbull injured, Johnstone made his debut the following day at the Keepmoat Stadium against Middlesbrough. On 4 April, Johnstone agreed a loan extension until the end of the 2013–14 season. On 27 October, Johnstone again joined Doncaster Rovers, with the club now in League One, on loan, initially until January 2015.

On 12 January 2015, Johnstone joined his hometown club, Preston North End of League One, on loan until the end of the 2014–15 season. On 25 May, Johnstone kept a clean sheet in the 2015 League One play-off final as Preston won promotion to the Championship with a 4–0 win over Swindon Town at Wembley Stadium. On Manchester United's pre-season tour of the United States in July 2015, Johnstone played as second-choice goalkeeper ahead of Anders Lindegaard, covering for David de Gea while the Spaniard recovered from a knock. He started in the victories over Club América and San Jose Earthquakes (playing the entire game) and came on as a second-half substitute against Barcelona in a 3–1 victory.

After rumours of De Gea's potential transfer Real Madrid caused the Spaniard to be dropped from the Manchester United squad, Johnstone was named on the bench behind Sergio Romero for the first game of the season against Tottenham Hotspur. After De Gea returned to the United first-team, following the collapse of his move, Johnstone failed to make the bench again in 2015.

On 31 December 2015, he re-signed for Preston on an initial 28-day loan, after Sunderland recalled Jordan Pickford on the same day. He made his first appearance of his second stint at Preston in a 2–1 home win over Rotherham United on 2 January 2016. On 16 October 2016, Johnstone extended his contract at Manchester United until June 2018.

==== Loans to Aston Villa ====
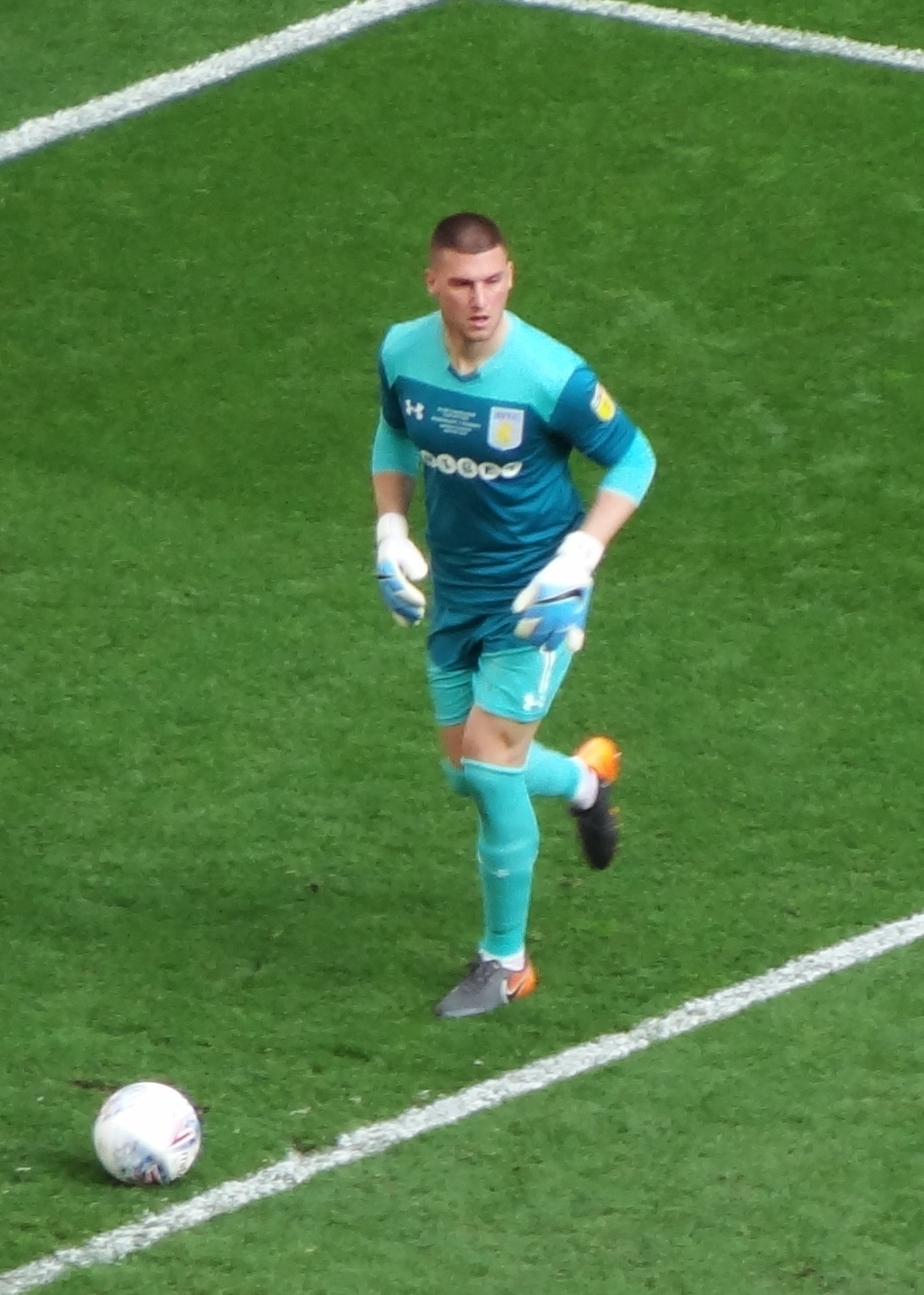
Johnstone playing for Aston Villa in 2018

On 5 January 2017, Johnstone joined Championship club Aston Villa on loan until the end of the 2016–17 season. He made his debut on 8 January 2017, in an FA Cup match against Tottenham Hotspur at White Hart Lane. During the period of this loan spell, he kept more clean sheets in the Championship than any other goalkeeper. In July 2017, he returned to Aston Villa on a loan deal until the end of the 2017–18 season.

=== West Bromwich Albion ===
On 3 July 2018, Johnstone signed a four-year contract with newly relegated Championship club West Bromwich Albion, for a transfer fee reported by BBC Sport to be an initial £6.5 million. He was part of the West Brom team that lost to Aston Villa in the EFL Championship play-off semi-finals on penalties in May 2019. However, the following season, Sam Johnstone helped the club gain automatic promotion to the Premier League for the 2020–21 season. Despite some criticism from fans, Johnstone kept his place as West Brom's first-choice goalkeeper and went on to have a great season despite the club being relegated that year. Sam Johnstone produced a number of 'world class' saves throughout the season, securing vital points for the club on numerous occasions.

On 15 December 2020, Johnstone produced two stoppage-time saves to deny İlkay Gündoğan and Raheem Sterling to secure a 1–1 draw for the club away at the home of future Premier League Champions, Manchester City. Johnstone also played well against former club Manchester United and reigning champions Liverpool, securing 1–1 draws against both. His fine form resulted in a trio of club awards at the end of the season, winning the Supporter's Player of the Year, Player's Player of the year and PFA Community Champion Award for his work off the field. West Brom were relegated again after the 2020–21 season, and West Ham United approached them with a £10 million offer for Johnstone, which was rejected. With the club stuck mid-table in the Championship, Johnstone didn't extend his contract.

=== Crystal Palace ===
On 21 June 2022, Johnstone agreed to join Crystal Palace on a free transfer as backup to Vicente Guaita. He made his debut in a 2–0 EFL Cup win against Oxford United on 23 August. He made his first Premier League appearance for Palace against Leeds United on 9 April 2023, and was praised for his performance in the 5–1 win. Coincidentally, the last time Palace had scored five goals in a game had been against Johnstone's West Brom in December 2020.

=== Wolverhampton Wanderers ===
On 30 August 2024, Wolverhampton Wanderers signed Johnstone on a four-year deal for a reported fee of £10 million.

== International career ==
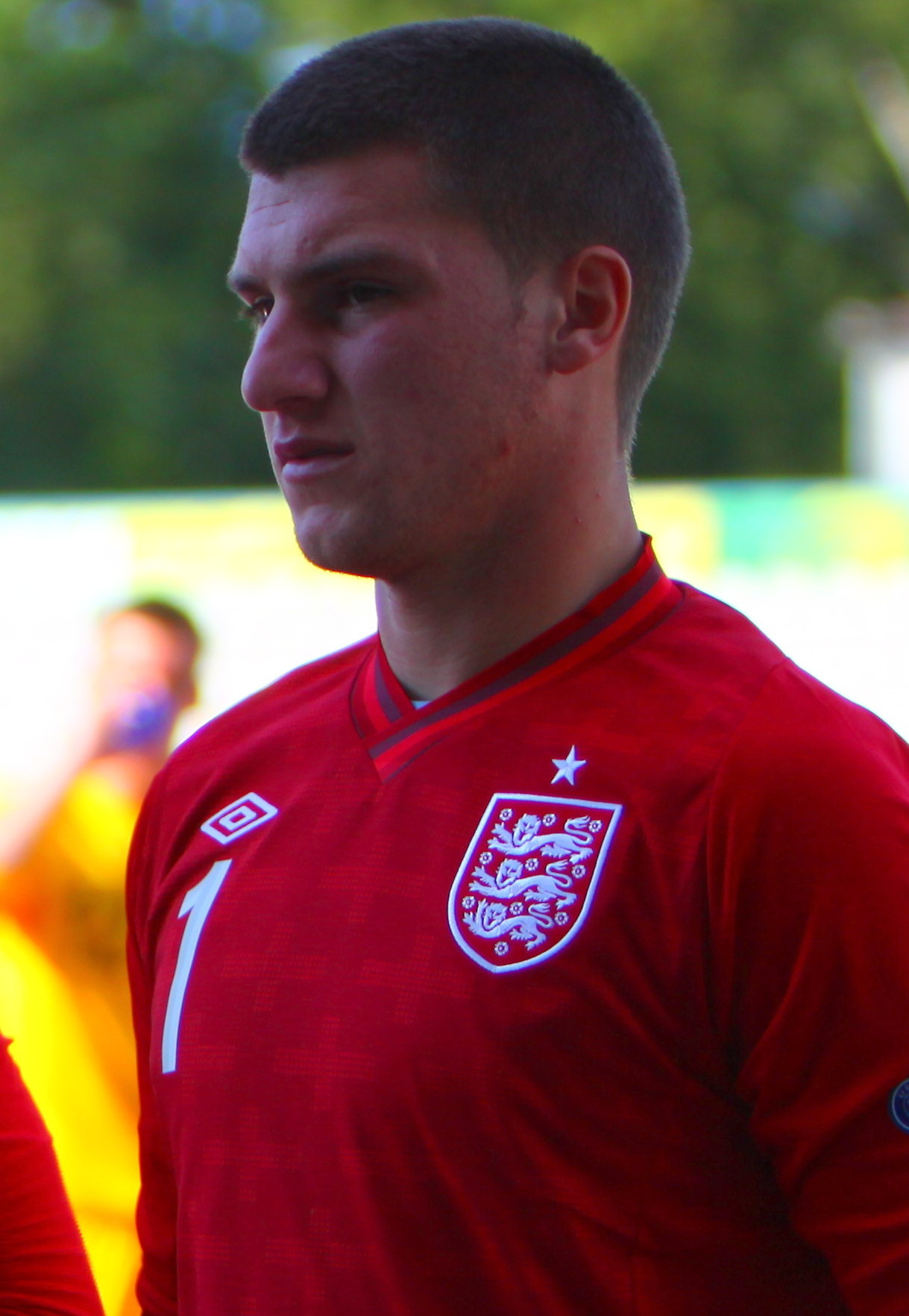
Johnstone playing for England U19 in 2012

Johnstone was a part of the victorious England under-17 squad at the 2010 UEFA European Under-17 Championship. He made his debut for the England under-19 team against Slovakia in September 2010.

On 28 May 2013, he was named in the 21-man squad for England under-20s at the 2013 FIFA U-20 World Cup. He made his debut on 23 June in England's first match of the tournament, a 2–2 draw with Iraq. He played in England's three matches at the tournament as they were eliminated at the group stage.

On 18 March 2021, Johnstone received his first call-up to the England senior team when he was named in the 26-man squad for their 2022 FIFA World Cup qualifiers against San Marino, Albania and Poland. He was named in the 26-man squad for UEFA Euro 2020, along with fellow goalkeepers Jordan Pickford and Dean Henderson, and made his debut on 6 June in England's final pre-tournament friendly, a 1–0 win over Romania at the Riverside Stadium.

Johnstone was not included in England's squad for the 2022 FIFA World Cup but was recalled for the team's UEFA Euro 2024 qualifiers against Malta and North Macedonia in June 2023. On 13 October 2023, he made his first international appearance in two years, keeping his fourth clean sheet in four caps as England beat Australia 1–0 at Wembley Stadium.

== Career statistics ==
=== Club ===
As of match played 6 March 2026

Appearances and goals by club, season and competition
Club	Season	League			FA Cup		EFL Cup		Europe		Other		Total	
Club	Season	Division	Apps	Goals	Apps	Goals	Apps	Goals	Apps	Goals	Apps	Goals	Apps	Goals
Manchester United	2011–12	Premier League	0	0	0	0	—		0	0	0	0	0	0
Manchester United	2012–13	Premier League	0	0	0	0	0	0	0	0	—		0	0
Manchester United	2013–14	Premier League	0	0	0	0	0	0	0	0	0	0	0	0
Manchester United	2014–15	Premier League	0	0	—		0	0	—		—		0	0
Manchester United	2015–16	Premier League	0	0	—		0	0	0	0	—		0	0
Manchester United	2016–17	Premier League	0	0	—		0	0	0	0	0	0	0	0
Manchester United	Total		0	0	0	0	0	0	0	0	0	0	0	0
Scunthorpe United (loan)	2011–12	League One	12	0	0	0	—		—		1 (Note: Appearance in Football League Trophy)	0	13	0
Walsall (loan)	2012–13	League One	7	0	—		—		—		—		7	0
Yeovil Town (loan)	2013–14	Championship	1	0	—		0	0	—		—		1	0
Doncaster Rovers (loan)	2013–14	Championship	18	0	—		—		—		—		18	0
Doncaster Rovers (loan)	2014–15	League One	10	0	3	0	—		—		1	0	14	0
Doncaster Rovers (loan)	Total		28	0	3	0	—		—		1	0	32	0
Preston North End (loan)	2014–15	League One	22	0	—		—		—		3 (Note: Appearances in League One play-offs)	0	25	0
Preston North End (loan)	2015–16	Championship	4	0	0	0	—		—		—		4	0
Preston North End (loan)	Total		26	0	0	0	—		—		3	0	29	0
Aston Villa (loan)	2016–17	Championship	21	0	1	0	—		—		—		22	0
Aston Villa (loan)	2017–18	Championship	45	0	0	0	0	0	—		3 (Note: Appearances in Championship play-offs)	0	48	0
Aston Villa (loan)	Total		66	0	1	0	0	0	—		3	0	70	0
West Bromwich Albion	2018–19	Championship	46	0	0	0	0	0	—		2	0	48	0
West Bromwich Albion	2019–20	Championship	46	0	0	0	0	0	—		—		46	0
West Bromwich Albion	2020–21	Premier League	37	0	0	0	0	0	—		—		37	0
West Bromwich Albion	2021–22	Championship	36	0	0	0	0	0	—		—		36	0
West Bromwich Albion	Total		165	0	0	0	0	0	—		2	0	167	0
Crystal Palace	2022–23	Premier League	9	0	0	0	2	0	—		—		11	0
Crystal Palace	2023–24	Premier League	20	0	1	0	2	0	—		—		23	0
Crystal Palace	Total		29	0	1	0	4	0	—		—		34	0
Wolverhampton Wanderers	2024–25	Premier League	7	0	3	0	0	0	—		—		10	0
Wolverhampton Wanderers	2025–26	Premier League	12	0	3	0	2	0	—		—		17	0
Wolverhampton Wanderers	Total		19	0	6	0	2	0	—		—		27	0
Career total			348	0	11	0	6	0	0	0	10	0	375	0

=== International ===
As of match played 13 October 2023

Appearances and goals by national team and year
National team	Year	Apps	Goals
England	2021	3	0
England	2023	1	0
Total		4	0

== Honours ==
Preston North End

- Football League One play-offs: 2015

West Bromwich Albion

- EFL Championship second-place promotion: 2019–20

England U17

- UEFA European Under-17 Championship: 2010

England

- UEFA European Championship runner-up: 2020

Individual

- West Bromwich Albion Supporters' Player of the Year: 2020–21
- West Bromwich Albion Players' Player of the Year: 2020–21
