= Dwight Gayle =

English footballer (born 1989)

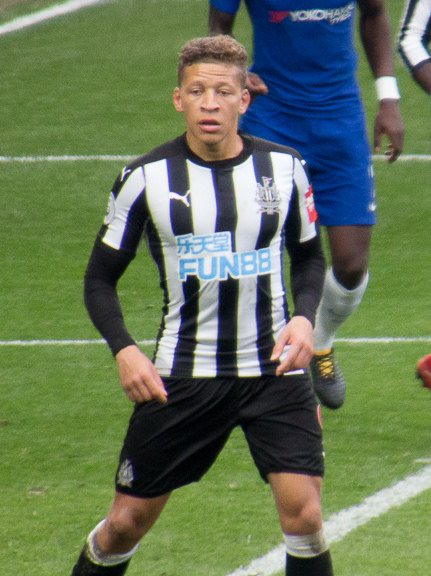
- Gayle playing for Newcastle United

Personal information
- Full name: Dwight Devon Boyd Gayle
- Date of birth: 17 October 1989 (age 37)
- Place of birth: Walthamstow, London, England
- Height: 5 ft 9 in (1.74 m)
- Position: Striker

Youth career
- Ridgeway Rovers
- Arsenal

Senior career*
Years	Team	Apps	(Gls)
2007–2009	Ryan		
2009–2011	Stansted		
2011–2013	Dagenham & Redbridge	18	(7)
2011–2012	→ Bishop's Stortford (loan)	42	(29)
2012–2013	→ Peterborough United (loan)	9	(7)
2013	Peterborough United	20	(6)
2013–2016	Crystal Palace	64	(15)
2016–2022	Newcastle United	113	(34)
2018–2019	→ West Bromwich Albion (loan)	39	(23)
2022–2024	Stoke City	45	(3)
2024	Derby County	6	(3)
2024–2025	Hibernian	28	(6)
Total		384	(133)
- * Club domestic league appearances and goals

Dwight Devon Boyd Gayle (born 17 October 1989) is an English former professional footballer who played as a striker.

Gayle played in the Arsenal academy as a youth, but was released in 2007, after which he began his career with Ryan of the Essex Olympian Football League. In subsequent seasons, he would work his way back up through the English football pyramid via stints at Stansted, Bishop's Stortford, Dagenham & Redbridge and Peterborough United, before establishing himself in the Premier League with Crystal Palace. In 2016, he signed for Newcastle United where he spent six years scoring 34 goals in 122 games. Gayle joined Stoke City in July 2022 before leaving in February 2024. Later on in the month Gayle joined Derby County, being released in June 2024. Gayle joined Hibernian in September 2024 and retired at the end of the 2024–25 season.

== Career ==
=== Early career ===
Gayle was born in Walthamstow, London and attended Chingford Foundation School. He started his career with youth club Ridgeway Rovers and spent time with the Arsenal academy but was released at the age of 12 due to his height. After leaving Arsenal, Gayle concentrated on his education taking courses in carpentry and later got a job refurbishing offices. He played semi-professional football in the Essex Olympian Football League with Ryan, before moving up to join Essex Senior League club Stansted in 2009, where he went on to score 57 goals in the 2010–11 season.

=== Dagenham & Redbridge ===
In the summer of 2011, he signed for League Two club Dagenham & Redbridge. In August 2011, he was sent out to Bishop's Stortford on a season-long loan, during which he scored 29 goals in 42 appearances in the Conference North. He then signed a three-year professional contract with Dagenham & Redbridge in July 2012. He made his professional debut for the Daggers on 18 August 2012, in a 2–0 defeat to Cheltenham Town.

=== Peterborough United ===
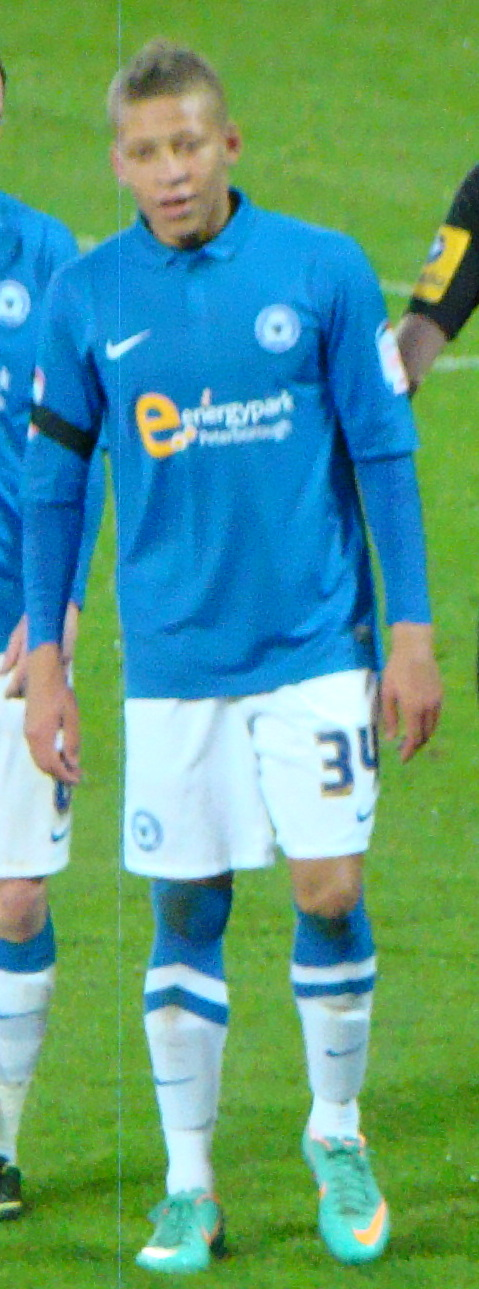
Gayle playing for Peterborough United in 2012

In November 2012, Gayle joined Peterborough United on loan with an option to make the move permanent in January 2013. At the time of his signing, he was described as an "energetic, hardworking, pacey striker" and a "natural finisher". His Peterborough debut came on 24 November as a 53rd-minute substitute for Saido Berahino in a 1–1 away draw with Ipswich Town. Gayle's first Peterborough goal was on 1 December: he picked up a poor backpass by Blackpool's Alex Baptiste to score what was only a consolation goal in a 4–1 home defeat. Peterborough manager Darren Ferguson said of Gayle: "He listens. He picks up things quickly, which is always a sign of a good player."

On 24 December, after scoring five goals in six matches during his loan spell, Gayle agreed to sign permanently for Peterborough. He joined on 2 January 2013 on a four-and-a-half-year contract for a fee of £500,000 which could rise to £750,000. On 2 March, he scored a hat-trick in a 3–2 win against Blackburn Rovers.

=== Crystal Palace ===
On 3 July 2013, Gayle signed a four-year contract for newly promoted Premier League club Crystal Palace for an undisclosed fee, reported as a club record £4.5 million. His former club Dagenham & Redbridge received £1 million of the initial transfer fee plus 20% of any extra payments made due to a sell-on clause added when he signed for Peterborough United. He made his Palace debut playing 90 minutes in a home match against Tottenham Hotspur on 18 August in a 1–0 loss. On 31 August, Gayle scored his first goal for the club and his first in the Premier League by successfully converting a penalty against Sunderland after he was fouled by John O'Shea. On 5 October, he scored in a 3–1 defeat against Liverpool at Anfield. On 26 December, he scored the only goal in a 1–0 away win against Aston Villa in added time at the end of the match. In part due to injury, he found first team appearance opportunities limited for the remainder of the season. He returned towards the end of the season scoring two goals as Palace came back from 3–0 down to draw 3–3 at home to Liverpool, which effectively ended their chances of the league title.

On 26 August 2014, Gayle scored his first hat-trick for Crystal Palace, scoring three times in the first half to give Palace a 3–0 win over Walsall in the second round of the League Cup. Four days later, he scored his first goal of the Premier League season in the opening minute of a 3–3 draw at Newcastle United. On 23 November, Gayle scored in the home fixture against Liverpool for the second consecutive season as Palace defeated the Merseyside team 3–1. On 4 January, Gayle scored his first goal of 2015 in a 4–0 win over Dover Athletic in the third round of the FA Cup. He then scored three goals in the team's next two matches; a 2–1 home win over Tottenham Hotspur and a 3–2 defeat of Burnley at Turf Moor. Gayle ended the season as top scorer in all competitions for Crystal Palace, despite, like the season before, struggling to hold down a consistent place in the starting eleven.

On 11 August 2015, Bristol City manager Steve Cotterill confirmed that Crystal Palace had accepted an undisclosed bid for Gayle. On 15 August, the transfer broke down as it was confirmed that Bristol City were no longer interested in signing Gayle. Gayle failed to hold down a regular first-team place, due to a series of injuries throughout the season. On 12 April 2016, Gayle signed a contract with Crystal Palace to keep him at the club until 2019. On 7 May 2016, the penultimate match of the season, Gayle scored two goals in a 2–1 victory over Stoke City to confirm Crystal Palace's safety in the Premier League. For the third season in a row Gayle, despite being unable to hold down a consistent place in the team, finished the season as top scorer in all competitions for Crystal Palace.

=== Newcastle United ===
On 1 July 2016, Gayle signed a five-year contract for newly relegated Championship club Newcastle United. He made his debut for the club on 5 August, in a 1–0 defeat to Fulham. He scored his first goal for the club on 13 August, in a 2–1 defeat to Huddersfield Town. After having his spot kick saved, he scored from the rebound with his head. Gayle would score in the next two matches for Newcastle, with a brace in a 4–1 win over Reading, and the only goal of the game against Bristol City. It was not until over a month later when he found the net again, scoring a hat-trick against Norwich City, coming back from 3–1 down to win 4–3 in stoppage time. During October, Gayle scored braces in consecutive victories against Brentford and Barnsley, and on 20 November, Gayle scored another brace, this time against Leeds United. On 10 December, Gayle scored a hat-trick against Birmingham City. He would later score in matches against Burton Albion and Nottingham Forest, ending 2016 as the league's top scorer with 19 goals.

On 14 January 2017, Gayle scored the opening goal in an eventual 2–1 win over Brentford, and in doing so, became the first Newcastle player since Alan Shearer to score 20 league goals in a season. A few minutes later however, he sustained a hamstring injury, and had to be substituted off. This injury kept him out for the next four matches; he would make his return against Norwich City, and started the match against Aston Villa, but once again, had to leave the pitch early. It would become a recurring problem for Gayle, and on three occasions from February to April, he had to be substituted off in the first half. Unsurprisingly, his goal tally also suffered, as he scored twice during this period, netting against Huddersfield Town and Wigan Athletic. Gayle was absent for the rest of April, and made his return on the final day of the season, scoring in a 3–0 win over Barnsley, as Newcastle edged out Brighton & Hove Albion by a point to win the Championship.

On 18 November 2017, Gayle scored the opening goal in an eventual 4–1 loss to Manchester United. His goal was the first that the Red Devils had conceded from open play since 31 December 2016. On 2 December, Gayle again scored the opening goal, this time, in a 3–1 loss to Chelsea. On 9 December, Gayle was involved in both Newcastle goals in a 3–2 loss to Leicester City, assisting Joselu for the first and then scoring the equaliser. In the second half of the season, Gayle remained a first team regular, but only scored three more goals for Newcastle – a brace against AFC Bournemouth in a 2–2 draw on 24 February 2018, and a goal against Chelsea in a 3–0 win, the final day of the season.

==== West Bromwich Albion (loan) ====
On 6 August 2018, Gayle joined newly relegated Championship club West Bromwich Albion on a season-long loan deal from Newcastle. The deal included Salomón Rondón going the other way for the 2018–19 season. On 11 August, Gayle drew a foul from his former Newcastle teammate Tim Krul, now of Norwich City, with the resulting penalty scored by Jay Rodriguez. On 18 August, Gayle scored his first goal for the club, the fourth goal in an emphatic 7–1 win over Queens Park Rangers. He was also the fouled player for both of Rodriguez's penalties. During September, Gayle scored four times in three consecutive home match wins over Stoke City, Bristol City and Millwall. On 29 September, he scored the third goal, a free-kick, in a 3–2 win over Preston North End. For his performances, he was awarded with the Championship Player of the Month by the EFL. On 6 October, Gayle scored a brace in a 4–1 win over Reading.

On 14 February 2019, Gayle was suspended for two matches after accepting a charge of "successful deception of a match official", following an incident in the match against Nottingham Forest earlier that week when he "won" a late penalty enabling his team to take a 2–2 draw. He finished the regular season with 23 goals as joint fourth place goalscorer in the Championship, including two hat-tricks against Preston and Rotherham. The Baggies finished the season in fourth place, setting up a derby playoff with Aston Villa. In the first leg on 11 May, Gayle opened the scoring, but was later sent off after challenging Villa's goalkeeper, Jed Steer, resulting in a second yellow card. This would turn out to be Gayle's final appearance as a Baggies player. Gayle ended the season as the club's Supporter's Player of the Season, whilst also picking up the club's Goal of the Season with his first goal in a 2–1 home victory against Stoke City.

==== Return to Newcastle ====
Gayle suffered a calf injury during Newcastle's pre-season tour of China, and would go on to miss Newcastle's first eight matches (in all competitions) of the 2019–20 season. He returned to the matchday squad against Manchester United, and then made his first appearance of the season against Chelsea, coming on as a late substitute. On 11 January 2020, Gayle assisted Miguel Almirón for the opening goal against Wolverhampton Wanderers, but was substituted off in the first half. A thigh injury kept him out for the next six weeks, and he returned to the side in a 1–0 loss to Crystal Palace. Due to the COVID-19 pandemic, the Premier League was suspended and resumed in June behind closed doors. Gayle played in eight matches during this period, scoring four times and assisting once, as Newcastle finished the season in thirteenth place.

On 26 August 2020, Gayle suffered a knee injury in a friendly with York City, and would go on to miss Newcastle's first thirteen matches (in all competitions) of the 2020–21 season. He scored on his return against his former club West Bromwich Albion, but this proved to be his only goal as he found himself in and out of the team throughout the season. The other significant contribution he made was against Liverpool on 24 April 2021, where he provided the assist for Joe Willock's last-minute equalising goal. On 7 July, Gayle signed a contract extension with Newcastle.

=== Stoke City ===
On 22 July 2022, Gayle joined Stoke City on a two-year contract. Alex Neil played him in a deeper midfield role. He scored his first goal for Stoke in a 4–0 win over Reading on 21 January 2023, which was his first goal in over two years. Gayle scored twice in a 5–1 win against Sunderland on 4 March 2023. He failed to add to his tally and ended 2022–23 with 37 appearances as Stoke finished in 16th position. Gayle's contract was terminated on 1 February 2024.

=== Derby County ===
On 16 February 2024, Gayle agreed to join League One club Derby County until the end of the 2023–24 season subject to EFL confirmation; the EFL ratified the contract three days later.

Gayle made his debut as a 61st-minute substitute for Louie Sibley in a 2–1 defeat at Barnsley and scored his first goal for the club with the second goal in a 3–0 win against Port Vale on 8 March. This was Gayle's first-ever goal in the third tier of English football, meaning he had scored in all four of the top tiers in the English football league pyramid. After the match, Derby head coach Paul Warne described Gayle as a "threat" despite being "rusty" from a lack of regular first team football in recent years, and praised the "boost" he had given the squad.

Gayle followed-up on his goal against Port Vale with the second goal in a 3–0 win at Bristol Rovers and then scored the opening goal and won the decisive penalty in a 2–1 home win over Reading; this was Gayle's first run of scoring in consecutive games since April 2019. Gayle explained that this "dream come true" form, helped him rediscover his love for football. Gayle picked up a hamstring injury on 16 March 2024 against Bolton Wanderers, a later scan of injury would rule him out of action for three weeks. However, Gayle did not feature in any further games for Derby; he made a total of six appearances for Derby, scoring three goals, as they secured promotion to the Championship.

On 18 May 2024, it was announced that Gayle would leave Derby at the end of his contract on 30 June 2024.

=== Hibernian ===
On 12 September 2024, Gayle joined Scottish Premiership club Hibernian on a one-year contract. He then quickly became a fans favourite. He scored the winning goal in the Edinburgh derby played on 26 December 2024, and helped Hibs qualify for European competition. Gayle indicated during the season that he would retire from playing at its conclusion, and this decision was later confirmed.

== Personal life ==
Gayle is of Jamaican descent through his father. He has three children with his wife Stefanie, whom he married in Portugal in 2024.

== Career statistics ==
Appearances and goals by club, season and competition
Club	Season	League			FA Cup		League Cup		Other		Total	
Club	Season	Division	Apps	Goals	Apps	Goals	Apps	Goals	Apps	Goals	Apps	Goals
Dagenham & Redbridge	2011–12	League Two	0	0	0	0	0	0	0	0	0	0
Dagenham & Redbridge	2012–13	League Two	18	7	1	0	0	0	1 (Note: Appearance in Football League Trophy)	0	20	7
Dagenham & Redbridge	Total		18	7	1	0	0	0	1	0	20	7
Bishop's Stortford (loan)	2011–12	Conference North	42	29	3	1	—		10 (Note: Three appearances and one goal in FA Trophy, two appearances and two goals in Herts Charity Cup, five appearances and nine goals in Herts Senior Cup)	12	55	42
Peterborough United	2012–13	Championship	29	13	0	0	0	0	—		29	13
Crystal Palace	2013–14	Premier League	23	7	2	1	0	0	—		25	8
Crystal Palace	2014–15	Premier League	25	5	2	1	2	4	—		29	10
Crystal Palace	2015–16	Premier League	16	3	1	0	3	4	—		20	7
Crystal Palace	Total		64	15	5	2	5	8	—		74	25
Newcastle United	2016–17	Championship	32	23	0	0	2	0	—		34	23
Newcastle United	2017–18	Premier League	35	6	2	0	0	0	—		37	6
Newcastle United	2018–19	Premier League	0	0	0	0	0	0	—		0	0
Newcastle United	2019–20	Premier League	20	4	2	0	0	0	—		22	4
Newcastle United	2020–21	Premier League	18	1	1	0	1	0	—		20	1
Newcastle United	2021–22	Premier League	8	0	0	0	1	0	—		9	0
Newcastle United	Total		113	34	5	0	4	0	—		122	34
West Bromwich Albion (loan)	2018–19	Championship	39	23	0	0	1	0	1 (Note: Appearance in Championship play-offs)	1	41	24
Stoke City	2022–23	Championship	35	3	1	0	1	0	—		37	3
Stoke City	2023–24	Championship	10	0	0	0	3	0	—		13	0
Stoke City	Total		45	3	1	0	4	0	—		50	3
Derby County	2023–24	League One	6	3	—		—		—		6	3
Hibernian	2024–25	Scottish Premiership	28	6	1	0	0	0	—		29	6
Career total			384	133	16	3	14	8	12	13	426	157

== Honours ==
Stansted

- Essex Senior League: 2009–10

Bishop's Stortford

- Herts Senior Cup: 2011–12

Crystal Palace

- FA Cup runner-up: 2015–16

Newcastle United

- EFL Championship: 2016–17

Derby County

- EFL League One second-place promotion: 2023–24

Individual

- Football League / EFL Championship Player of the Month: December 2012, September 2018, April 2019
- Crystal Palace Goal of the Year: 2014
- EFL Championship Goal of the Month: August 2016
- PFA Fans' Player of the Month: October 2016
- EFL Team of the Season: 2016–17
- PFA Team of the Year: 2016–17 Championship
- PFA Fans' Player of the Year: 2016–17 Championship
- West Bromwich Albion Supporters' Player of the Season: 2018–19
- West Bromwich Albion Goal of the Season: 2018–19
