= 2016–17 Fulham F.C. season =

Fulham
2016–17 season
- Chairman: Shahid Khan
- Manager: Slaviša Jokanović
- Stadium: Craven Cottage
- EFL Championship: 6th
- FA Cup: Fifth round (lost to Tottenham Hotspur)
- EFL Cup: Third round (lost to Bristol City)
- Play-offs: Semi-finals
- Top goalscorer: League: Tom Cairney (13); All: Tom Cairney, Stefan Johansen (13)
- Highest home attendance: 24,300 (vs Brighton & Hove Albion, Championship, 2 January 2017)
- Lowest home attendance: 6,017 (vs Bristol City, EFL Cup, 21 September 2016)
- Average home league attendance: 18,498
Home colours	Away colours

The 2016–17 Fulham F.C. season was the Fulham F.C. 119th professional season and third consecutive in the EFL Championship after the club's relegation from the Premier League in 2013–14. The club contested the EFL Cup and the FA Cup. Fulham mathematically secured a place in the 2016–17 EFL Championship play-offs by beating fellow promotion hopefuls Sheffield Wednesday 2–1 away from home on 7 May 2017.

== Transfers ==
=== In ===
Date	Pos.	Name	Previous club	Fee	Source
20 May 2016	DF	(Austria) Michael Madl	(Austria) Sturm Graz	Undisclosed	
1 July 2016	MF	(Togo) Floyd Ayité	(France) Bastia	Undisclosed	
8 July 2016	FW	(Nigeria) Sone Aluko	(England) Hull City	Free	
14 July 2016	DF	(Belgium) Denis Odoi	(Belgium) Lokeren	Undisclosed	
19 July 2016	DF	(England) Scott Malone	(Wales) Cardiff City	Swap	
19 July 2016	GK	(England) David Button	(England) Brentford	Undisclosed	
22 July 2016	MF	(Scotland) Kevin McDonald	(England) Wolverhampton Wanderers	Undisclosed	
12 August 2016	MF	(Spain) Jozabed	(Spain) Rayo Vallecano	Undisclosed	
22 August 2016	DF	(Iceland) Ragnar Sigurðsson	(Russia) Krasnodar	Undisclosed	
26 August 2016	MF	(Democratic Republic of the Congo) Neeskens Kebano	(Belgium) Genk	Undisclosed	
26 August 2016	MF	(Norway) Stefan Johansen	(Scotland) Celtic	Undisclosed	

=== Loans in ===
Date	Pos.	Name	Parent club	End date	Source
13 July 2016	DF	(Czech Republic) Tomáš Kalas	(England) Chelsea	End of season	
31 August 2016	FW	(Brazil) Lucas Piazon	(England) Chelsea	15 January 2017	
31 August 2016	FW	(Scotland) Chris Martin	(England) Derby County	End of season	
17 January 2017	FW	(Brazil) Lucas Piazon	(England) Chelsea	End of season	
26 January 2017	MF	(Greece) Thanos Petsos	(Germany) Werder Bremen	End of season	
31 January 2017	FW	(Ivory Coast) Cyriac	(Belgium) Oostende	End of season	

=== Out ===
Date	Pos.	Name	New club	Fee	Source
8 May 2016	DF	(England) Dan Burn	(England) Wigan Athletic	Free	
18 May 2016	FW	(Greece) Konstantinos Mitroglou	(Portugal) Benfica	Undisclosed	
20 May 2016	GK	(England) Andrew Dawber	(England) Altrincham	Undisclosed	
7 June 2016	DF	(England) Stephen Arthurworrey	Released		
7 June 2016	DF	(Northern Ireland) Liam Donnelly	(England) Hartlepool United	Free	
7 June 2016	DF	(Republic of Ireland) Shane Elworthy	Released		
7 June 2016	DF	(Wales) Jordan Evans	(England) Wrexham	Free	
7 June 2016	DF	(England) Shaun Hutchinson	(England) Millwall	Free	
7 June 2016	MF	(Sweden) Alexander Kačaniklić	(France) Nantes	Free	
7 June 2016	MF	(Republic of Ireland) Dean O'Halloran	Released		
7 June 2016	MF	(England) Jamie O'Hara	(England) Gillingham	Free	
7 June 2016	DF	(Spain) Ian Pino Soler	Released		
7 June 2016	MF	(France) Ange-Freddy Plumain	(France) Sedan	Free	
7 June 2016	FW	(England) Aaron Redford	(England) Basingstoke Town	Free	
8 June 2016	GK	(England) Andy Lonergan	(England) Wolverhampton Wanderers	Undisclosed	
17 June 2016	MF	(United States) Emerson Hyndman	(England) AFC Bournemouth	Free	
28 June 2016	FW	(France) Moussa Dembélé	(Scotland) Celtic	Free	
1 July 2016	GK	(Netherlands) Maarten Stekelenburg	(England) Everton	Undisclosed	
4 July 2016	MF	(England) Ben Pringle	(England) Preston North End	Undisclosed	
19 July 2016	DF	(Wales) Jazz Richards	(Wales) Cardiff City	Swap	
22 July 2016	DF	(Venezuela) Fernando Amorebieta	(Spain) Sporting Gijón	Undisclosed	
4 August 2016	FW	(Scotland) Ross McCormack	(England) Aston Villa	£12,000,000	
8 August 2016	MF	(Finland) Sakari Mattila	(Denmark) SønderjyskE	Free	
26 August 2016	DF	(Bulgaria) Nikolay Bodurov	(Bulgaria) CSKA Sofia	Free	
31 January 2017	FW	(England) Matt Smith	(England) Queens Park Rangers	Undisclosed	

=== Loans out ===
Date	Pos.	Name	Subsequent club	End date	Source
18 July 2016	DF	(Australia) Cameron Burgess	(England) Oldham Athletic	5 January 2017	
29 July 2016	MF	(Wales) George Williams	(England) Milton Keynes Dons	3 January 2017	
31 August 2016	DF	(England) Richard Stearman	(England) Wolverhampton Wanderers	End of season	
31 August 2016	MF	(England) Larnell Cole	(Scotland) Inverness Caledonian Thistle	January 2017 (exact date unknown)	
31 August 2016	DF	(Scotland) Jack Grimmer	(England) Shrewsbury Town	End of season	
5 January 2017	MF	(Republic of Ireland) Sean Kavanagh	(England) Hartlepool United	End of season	
6 January 2017	DF	(Australia) Cameron Burgess	(England) Bury	End of season	
13 January 2017	MF	(Spain) Jozabed	(Spain) Celta Vigo	End of season	
13 January 2017	GK	(Slovakia) Marek Rodák	(England) Accrington Stanley	End of season	
20 January 2017	MF	(England) Ryan Tunnicliffe	(England) Wigan Athletic	End of season	
26 January 2017	FW	(England) Stephen Humphrys	(England) Shrewsbury Town	End of season	
27 January 2017	MF	(Denmark) Lasse Vigen Christensen	(England) Burton Albion	End of season	
27 January 2017	FW	(England) Cauley Woodrow	(England) Burton Albion	End of season	

== Pre-season ==
=== Friendlies ===
6 July 2016	Cobh Ramblers	0–5	Fulham	Fota Island
		Report	Smith 8', 16'; Humphrys 28', 35'; Madl 57'

9 July 2016	Cork City	0–3	Fulham	Turners Cross, Cork
15:00 BST		Report	Humphrys 16', 25'; Smith 51'

12 July 2016	Fulham	5–0	Preston North End	Fota Island
	Woodrow; Aluko; Smith	Report

16 July 2016	Tottenham Hotspur	0–1	Fulham	Enfield Training Centre, London
		Report	De la Torre

19 July 2016	Fulham	3–0	Brighton and Hove Albion	Recreation Ground, Hampshire
19:45 BST	Woodrow 32'; Sessegnon 52'; Stearman 79'	Report

23 July 2016	Real Betis	2–1	Fulham	Estadio Ciudad de Lepe, Huelva
20:00 CEST	Piccini 23'; Joaquín 88' (pen.)	Report	Woodrow 37'

25 July 2016	Nacional	0–0	Fulham	Estadio da Nora, Albufeira
20:00 CEST		Report

30 July 2016	Fulham	3–1	Crystal Palace	Craven Cottage, Fulham
15:00 BST	Cairney 35'; Smith 55'; Ayité 90+1'	Report	Anderson 78'

== Competitions ==
=== Overall ===
Competition	Started round	Current position / round	Final position / round	First match	Last match
Championship	—	6th		5 August 2016	
League Cup	First round	—	Third round	9 August 2016	21 September 2016
FA Cup	Third round	—	Fifth round	8 January 2017	19 February 2017

Updated to match played 1 April 2017
Source: Competitions

=== League table ===
Pos	Team	Pld	W	D	L	GF	GA	GD	Pts	Promotion, qualification or relegation
4	Sheffield Wednesday	46	24	9	13	60	45	+15	81	Qualification for the Championship play-offs (Note: Four teams play for one spot and promotion to the Premier League.)
5	Huddersfield Town (O, P)	46	25	6	15	56	58	−2	81	Qualification for the Championship play-offs
6	Fulham	46	22	14	10	85	57	+28	80	Qualification for the Championship play-offs
7	Leeds United	46	22	9	15	61	47	+14	75	
8	Norwich City	46	20	10	16	85	69	+16	70	

Source: English Football League, Soccerway
Rules for classification: 1) Points; 2) Goal difference; 3) Number of goals scored; 4) Points in head-to-head matches; 5) Goal difference in head-to-head matches; 6) Goals scored in head-to-head matches; 7) Play-off.
(O) Play-off winners; (P) Promoted

==== Results summary ====
Overall								Home						Away					
Pld	W	D	L	GF	GA	GD	Pts	W	D	L	GF	GA	GD	W	D	L	GF	GA	GD
46	22	14	10	85	57	+28	80	10	8	5	45	32	+13	12	6	5	40	25	+15

Last updated: 7 May 2017.
Source: Sky Sports

==== Matches ====
The fixture list was released on 22 June 2016, with Fulham playing their first match at home to Newcastle United live on Sky Sports.

5 August 2016 1	Fulham	1–0	Newcastle United	Fulham, London
19:45 BST	Odoi (yellow card) 10'; Smith 45'	Report	Hanley (yellow card) 68'; Dummett (yellow card) 75'; Janmaat (yellow card) 90+4'	Stadium: Craven Cottage; Attendance: 23,922; Referee: Simon Hooper
Note: Live on Sky Sports

13 August 2016 2	Preston North End	1–2	Fulham	Preston
15:00 BST	Robinson 71'	Report	Aluko 33'; Ayité (yellow card) 43'; Smith 67'; Cairney (yellow card) 78'	Stadium: Deepdale; Attendance: 10,809; Referee: James Adcock

16 August 2016 3	Leeds United	1–1	Fulham	Leeds
19:45 BST	Bartley (yellow card) 76'; Wood 90+3'	Report	Odoi (yellow card) 54'; Cairney 77'	Stadium: Elland Road; Attendance: 21,204; Referee: Christopher Kavanagh

20 August 2016 4	Fulham	2–2	Cardiff City	Fulham, London
15:00 BST	Sessegnon 44'; Madl (yellow card) 83'; McDonald 86'	Report	Ralls 60'; Pilkington 65'; Whittingham (yellow card) 75'; Harris (yellow card) 77'	Stadium: Craven Cottage; Attendance: 15,401; Referee: Jeremy Simpson

27 August 2016 5	Blackburn Rovers	0–1	Fulham	Blackburn
15:00 BST	Akpan (yellow card) 76'	Report	Parker (yellow card) 68'; Cairney 90+4'	Stadium: Ewood Park; Attendance: 10,464; Referee: Scott Duncan

10 September 2016 6	Fulham	0–1	Birmingham City	Fulham, London
15:00 BST	Madl (yellow card) 26' (yellow-red card) 44'; Odoi (yellow card) 54'	Report	Donaldson (penalty missed) 26', (yellow card) 42', (goal) 49' (pen.); Grounds (yellow card) 45+1'; Spector (yellow card) 90+1'	Stadium: Craven Cottage; Attendance: 17,603; Referee: Tony Harrington

13 September 2016 7	Fulham	1–1	Burton Albion	Fulham, London
19:45 BST	Sigurðsson (yellow card) 81'; Sessegnon 90+3'; Parker (yellow card) 90+4'	Report	Irvine 51', (yellow card) 90+7'; Turner (yellow card) 75'; Ward (yellow card) 90+2'	Stadium: Craven Cottage; Attendance: 15,288; Referee: Tim Robinson

17 September 2016 8	Wigan Athletic	0–0	Fulham	Wigan
15:00 BST		Report	Odoi (yellow card) 51'	Stadium: DW Stadium; Attendance: Steve Martin; Referee: 10,582

24 September 2016 9	Fulham	0–4	Bristol City	Fulham, London
15:00 BST	Parker (yellow card) 38'; McDonald (red card) 79'	Report	Abraham 10'; Little (yellow card) 49'; Freeman 60'; Reid 68'; Flint 83'; Paterson (yellow card) 83'	Stadium: Craven Cottage; Attendance: 20,585; Referee: Peter Bankes

27 September 2016 10	Nottingham Forest	1–1	Fulham	Nottingham
19:45 BST	Dumitru (yellow card) 40'; Bendtner 60'; Fox (yellow card) 78'	Report	Cairney 72'	Stadium: City Ground; Attendance: 17,388; Referee: Darren Bond

1 October 2016 11	Fulham	1–2	Queens Park Rangers	Fulham, London
12:45 BST	Cairney (penalty missed) 6'; Ream 47', (yellow card) 83'; Malone (yellow card) 58'; Aluko (penalty missed) 90+6'	Report	Caulker (yellow card) 5'; Washington 20'; Henry (yellow card) 74'; Sylla 87', (yellow card) 90+6'	Stadium: Craven Cottage; Attendance: 19,609; Referee: Lee Mason

15 October 2016 12	Barnsley	2–4	Fulham	Barnsley
15:00 BST	Watkins 4'; Winnall 41', (yellow card) 54'; Scowen (red card) 67'; Hammill (yellow card) 90+2'	Report	Johansen (yellow card) 14'; Cairney (yellow card) 29'; Piazon 37'; Aluko 42'; Malone 46'; Martin (yellow card) 56', (goal) 65'; Button (yellow card) 61'	Stadium: Oakwell; Attendance: 11,374; Referee: Keith Stroud

18 October 2016 13	Fulham	2–2	Norwich City	Fulham, London
19:45 BST	Aluko (yellow card) 39'; Malone (yellow card) 40'; Parker (yellow card) 41'; Johansen 55', (yellow card) 87'; C Martin 66'	Report	Dorrans 17' (pen.), 41' (pen.), (yellow card) 87'; Jerome (yellow card) 43'; R Martin (yellow card) 87'	Stadium: Craven Cottage; Attendance: 17,082; Referee: James Linington

22 October 2016 14	Aston Villa	1–0	Fulham	Birmingham
15:00 BST	Kodjia 80'	Report	Piazon (yellow card) 45'; McDonald (yellow card) 72'; Martin (yellow card) 83'; Madl (yellow card) 90'	Stadium: Villa Park; Attendance: 32,201; Referee: Andrew Madley

29 October 2016 15	Fulham	5–0	Huddersfield Town	Fulham, London
15:00 BST	Martin 8', 63' (pen.); Kalas 34'; Fredericks (yellow card) 36'; Piazon 42'; McDonald 66'	Report	Whitehead (yellow card) 30'; Palmer (yellow card) 36'	Stadium: Craven Cottage; Attendance: 19,858; Referee: David Coote

4 November 2016 16	Brentford	0–2	Fulham	London
19:45 GMT	Dean (yellow card) 83'; Bjelland (yellow card) 89'; Vibe (yellow card) 90+5'	Report	McDonald (yellow card) 27'; Aluko 36'; Cairney 90+2'	Stadium: Griffin Park; Attendance: 12,052; Referee: Tim Robinson
Note: Live on Sky Sports

19 November 2016 17	Fulham	1–1	Sheffield Wednesday	Fulham, London
15:00 GMT	Johansen (yellow card) 34'; Parker (yellow card) 79'; Malone 90+1'	Report	Forestieri 10'; Hutchinson (yellow card) 27'; Wallace (yellow card) 41'; Fletcher (yellow card) 81'; Westwood (yellow card) 87'	Stadium: Craven Cottage; Attendance: 20,255; Referee: Geoff Eltringham

26 November 2016 18	Brighton and Hove Albion	2–1	Fulham	Brighton
15:00 GMT	Dunk (yellow card) 47'; Baldock 52'; Sidwell (yellow card) 58'; Stephens (yellow card) 61'; Murray 79'	Report	McDonald 18', (yellow card) 76'; Sigurðsson (yellow card) 50'; Button (yellow card) 51'; Martin (yellow card) 59'; Fredericks (yellow card) 89'	Stadium: Falmer Stadium; Attendance: 29,445; Referee: James Linington

3 December 2016 19	Fulham	5–0	Reading	Fulham, London
15:00 GMT	Gunter 15' (o.g.); Aluko (yellow card) 40', (goal) 68'; Martin 49', 90'; Johansen 71'	Report	McShane (yellow card) 2'; Obita (yellow card) 50'; Williams (red card) 54' van den Berg (yellow card) 57'; Evans (yellow card) 88'	Stadium: Craven Cottage; Attendance: 18,217; Referee: Oliver Langford

10 December 2016 20	Wolverhampton Wanderers	4–4	Fulham	Wolverhampton
15:00 GMT	Edwards (yellow card) 16', (goal) 90'; Hause 22'; Coady (yellow card) 26'; Dicko (yellow card) 64'; Doherty 65'; Cavaleiro 74'; Burgonye (yellow card) 90+2'	Report	Fredericks (yellow card) 8'; Johansen 32'; Ayité 39', 90+4'; Cairney 42', (yellow card) 69'; Malone (yellow card) 70'	Stadium: Molineux; Attendance: 19,020; Referee: Darren Bond

13 December 2016 21	Fulham	2–1	Rotherham United	Fulham, London
19:45 GMT	Johansen 32'; Ayité 54'; Martin (penalty missed) 67'	Report	Newell 19'; Wood (yellow card) 90+1'	Stadium: Craven Cottage; Attendance: 13,735; Referee: Stephen Martin

17 December 2016 22	Fulham	2–2	Derby County	Fulham, London
15:00 GMT	Fredericks (yellow card) 32'; Johansen (yellow card) 40', (goal) 61'; Ayité 45+1'; Madl (yellow card) 90+2'	Report	Ince 34'; Pearce 75'; Bryson (yellow card) 85'	Stadium: Craven Cottage; Attendance: 18,748; Referee: Andy Woolmer

26 December 2016 23	Ipswich Town	0–2	Fulham	Ipswich
15:00 GMT	Lawrence (yellow card) 69'; McGoldrick (yellow card) 76'	Report	Martin 36'; McDonald (yellow card) 64'; Sigurðsson 78'	Stadium: Portman Road; Attendance: 19,723; Referee: Oliver Langford

30 December 2016 24	Reading	P–P	Fulham	Reading
20:00 GMT	Williams (yellow card) 40'	Report	Fredericks (yellow card) 9'	Stadium: Madejski Stadium; Attendance: unknown Referee: James Linington
Note: Match postponed at half time owing to thick fog.

2 January 2017 25	Fulham	1–2	Brighton and Hove Albion	Fulham, London
15:00 GMT	Johansen (penalty missed) 15'; Smith (yellow card) 40'; Piazon 55'; Fredericks (yellow card) 90+1'	Report	Bruno (yellow card) 16'; Knockaert (yellow card) 71'; Hemed 74' (pen.); Dunk 75', (yellow card) 90+4'	Stadium: Craven Cottage; Attendance: 24,300; Referee: Stuart Attwell

14 January 2017 26	Fulham	2–0	Barnsley	Fulham, London
15:00 GMT	Martin 45+2' (pen.); Malone 55'	Report	White (yellow card) 53'; Watkins (yellow card) 72'	Stadium: Craven Cottage; Attendance: 18,018; Referee: Andy Davies

21 January 2017 27	Queens Park Rangers	1–1	Fulham	London
12:30 GMT	Furlong (yellow card) 23'; Manning 25', (yellow card) 50'; Luongo (yellow card) 40'; Sylla (yellow card) 61'; Lynch (yellow card) 90+6'	Report	Martin (penalty missed) 7', 75', (yellow card) 90+6'; Fredericks (yellow card) 36'; Cairney (yellow card) 90+5'	Stadium: Loftus Road; Attendance: 17,025; Referee: Keith Stroud
Note: Live on Sky Sports

24 January 2017 24 R	Reading	1–0	Fulham	Reading
20:00 GMT	McShane (yellow card) 32'; Swift (penalty missed) 49'; Beerens 49'	Report	Martin (yellow card) 72', (penalty missed) 90'	Stadium: Madejski Stadium; Attendance: 16,012; Referee: Steve Martin

1 February 2017 28	Burton Albion	0–2	Fulham	Burton
19:45 GMT	O'Grady (yellow card) 67'	Report	Johansen 48'; Malone 71'	Stadium: Pirelli Stadium; Attendance: 3,725; Referee: Tony Harrington

4 February 2017 29	Birmingham City	1–0	Fulham	Birmingham
15:00 GMT	Kieta (yellow card) 46'; Gleeson (yellow card) 51'; Kieftenbald (yellow card) 65'; Jutkiewicz 75'	Report	Aluko (yellow card) 52'; Fredericks (red card) 68'; McDonald (yellow card) 79'	Stadium: Saint Andrew's Stadium; Attendance: 17,426; Referee: Andy Madley

11 February 2017 30	Fulham	3–2	Wigan Athletic	Fulham, London
15:00 GMT	Aluko (yellow card) 21'; Ayité 25'; Odoi 71'; Kebano 90+4'	Report	Malone 32' (o.g.); Jacobs 45+2'; Burn (yellow card) 61'; Connolly (yellow card) 70'	Stadium: Craven Cottage; Attendance: 15,552; Referee: David Coote

14 February 2017 31	Fulham	3–2	Nottingham Forest	Fulham, London
19:45 GMT	Cairney 30'; Piazon 33'; Madl (yellow card) 66'; Hobbs 72' (o.g.); McDonald (yellow card) 80'	Report	Kasami 2'; Brereton 47'; Fox (yellow card) 90+3'	Stadium: Craven Cottage; Attendance: 15,365; Referee: James Linington

22 February 2017 32	Bristol City	0–2	Fulham	Bristol
20:00 GMT	Hegeler (yellow card) 61'	Report	Piazon 17'; Johansen (yellow card) 45'; Cairney 54'; Ream (yellow card) 71'	Stadium: Ashton Gate; Attendance: 17,272; Referee: Tim Robinson

25 February 2017 33	Cardiff City	2–2	Fulham	Cardiff
15:00 GMT	Zohore 24', 56', (yellow card) 57'; Gunnarsson (yellow card) 41'	Report	Johansen 17'; Piazon (yellow card) 21'; Kebano 68'	Stadium: Cardiff City Stadium; Attendance: 15,656; Referee: Scott Duncan

4 March 2017 34	Fulham	3–1	Preston North End	Fulham, London
15:00 GMT	Aluko 22'; Martin 60'; Kebano 77'	Report	Barkhuizen 68'; Pearson (yellow card) 79'; Cunningham (yellow card) 90+3'	Stadium: Craven Cottage; Attendance: 20,205; Referee: Simon Hooper

7 March 2017 35	Fulham	1–1	Leeds United	Fulham, London
19:45 GMT	McDonald (yellow card) 32'; Johansen (yellow card) 37'; Cairney 90+5', (yellow card) 90+6'	Report	Ream 5' (o.g.); Phillips (yellow card) 50' (yellow-red card) 89'; Barrow (yellow card) 80'	Stadium: Craven Cottage; Attendance: 22,239; Referee: Lee Probert

11 March 2017 36	Newcastle United	1–3	Fulham	Newcastle-upon-Tyne
15:00 GMT	Atsu (yellow card) 50'; Clark (yellow card) 60'; Murphy 76'; Shelvey (yellow card) 79'; Dummett (yellow card) 89'	Report	Cairney 15'; Sessegnon 51', 59'; McDonald (yellow card) 73'; Ream (penalty missed) 90+2'; Malone (yellow card) 90+3'	Stadium: St. James' Park; Attendance: 51,903; Referee: James Linington

14 March 2017 37	Fulham	2–2	Blackburn Rovers	Fulham, London
19:45 GMT	Aluko 45'; Fredericks (yellow card) 49'; McDonald (yellow card) 62'; Cyriac 86'	Report	Guthrie (yellow card) 40'; Lenihan (yellow card) 63'; Conway 79' (pen.); Emnes (yellow card) 83'; João 90+3', (yellow card) 90+4'	Stadium: Craven Cottage; Attendance: 15,487; Referee: Andrew Davies

18 March 2017 38	Fulham	1–3	Wolverhampton Wanderers	Fulham, London
15:00 GMT	Odoi 54'	Report	Cavaleiro 34', (yellow card) 39'; Evans (yellow card) 40'; Weimann 47'; Edwards 72'; Coady (yellow card) 77'	Stadium: Craven Cottage; Attendance: unknown Referee: Chris Kavanagh

1 April 2017 39	Rotherham United	0–1	Fulham	Rotherham
15:00 BST	Purrington (yellow card) 81'	Report	Aluko 66'; Johansen (yellow card) 90'	Stadium: New York Stadium; Attendance: 9,004; Referee: Tim Robinson

4 April 2017 40	Derby County	4–2	Fulham	Derby
19:45 BST	Nugent 8', 42', 59'; Russell 67'	Report	Ayité 35', 79'; Lucas Piazon (yellow card) 45+2'; McDonald (yellow card) 87'; Aluko (yellow card) 90'	Stadium: iPro Stadium; Attendance: 27,221; Referee: Jeremy Simpson

8 April 2017 41	Fulham	3–1	Ipswich Town	Fulham, London
15:00 BST	Ayité 16'; Malone 29', (yellow card) 89'; McDonald (yellow card) 36'; Johansen 60'; Ream (yellow card) 73'	Report	Chambers (yellow card) 51'; Berra 90'	Stadium: Craven Cottage; Attendance: 20,959; Referee: Geoff Eltringham

14 April 2017 42	Norwich City	1–3	Fulham	Norwich
15:00 BST	Hoolahan (yellow card) 28'; Howson (yellow card) 46'; Jerome (yellow card) 57', (goal) 76'; Pinto (yellow card) 77'	Report	Johansen 5'; Martin (red card) 45+2'; Cairney 48' (pen.); Malone (yellow card) 59'; Bettinelli (yellow card) 68'; Piazon (yellow card) 85'; Ayité 89'	Stadium: Carrow Road; Attendance: 27,023; Referee: Andrew Madley

17 April 2017 43	Fulham	3–1	Aston Villa	Fulham, London
14:45 BST	Sessegnon 17'; Aluko 56'; Kebano 79'	Report	Kodjia (red card) 22'; Amavi (yellow card) 26'; Grealish 50'; Gardner (yellow card) 55'; Hogan (yellow card) 58'	Stadium: Craven Cottage; Attendance: 23,891; Referee: David Coote

22 April 2017 44	Huddersfield Town	1–4	Fulham	Huddersfield
15:00 BST	Löwe 5' (pen.); Billing (yellow card) 26'	Report	Malone 16'; Fredericks (yellow card) 18'; Odoi (yellow card) 50'; Cairney 20' (pen.); Johansen 36', 45'	Stadium: The John Smith's Stadium; Attendance: 21,203; Referee: Andy Davies

29 April 2017 45	Fulham	1–1	Brentford	Fulham, London
15:00 BST	Cairney 8'; Johansen (yellow card) 90+1'	Report	Yennaris 34'	Stadium: Craven Cottage; Attendance: 24,594; Referee: Darren Bond

7 May 2017 46	Sheffield Wednesday	1–2	Fulham	Owlerton, Sheffield
13:30 BST	Winnall 9'; Matias (red card) 45+1'	Report	Kebano 25', 79'; Kalas (yellow card) 59'	Stadium: Hillsborough Stadium; Attendance: 33,861; Referee: Graham Scott

==== Results by matchday ====
Matchday	1	2	3	4	5	6	7	8	9	10	11	12	13	14	15	16	17	18	19	20	21	22	23	24	25	26	27	28	29	30	31	32	33	34	35	36	37	38	39	40	41	42	43	44	45	46
Ground	H	A	A	H	A	H	H	A	H	A	H	A	H	A	H	A	H	A	H	A	H	H	A	H	H	A	A	A	A	H	H	A	A	H	H	A	H	H	A	A	H	A	H	A	H	A
Result	W	W	D	D	W	L	D	D	L	D	L	W	D	L	W	W	D	L	W	D	W	D	W	L	W	D	L	W	L	W	W	W	D	W	D	W	D	L	W	L	W	W	W	W	D	W
Position	1	3	4	4	2	5	6	8	13	12	13	9	11	14	11	7	8	10	10	9	9	9	7	10	8	7	9	9	10	9	8	7	7	7	7	7	7	7	6	7	7	7	6	6	6	6

Updated to match(es) played on 7 May 2017. Source: Statto.com
A = Away; H = Home; W = Win; D = Draw; L = Loss

==== Play-offs ====
13 May 2017 Semi-final first leg	Fulham	1–1	Reading	Fulham, London
17:30 BST	Malone (yellow card) 54'; McDonald (yellow card) 56'; Cairney 65'	Report	Swift (yellow card) 40'; Kermorgant (yellow card) 42'; Obita 53'; McShane (red card) 80'	Stadium: Craven Cottage; Attendance: 23,717; Referee: Stuart Attwell

16 May 2017 Semi-final second leg	Reading	1–0 (2–1 agg.)	Fulham	Reading
19:45 BST	Kermorgant 49' (pen.), (yellow card) 51'; Moore (yellow card) 52'	Report	McDonald (yellow card) 38'; Johansen (yellow card) 58'; Malone (yellow card) 65'	Stadium: Madejski Stadium; Attendance: 22,044; Referee: Martin Atkinson

=== EFL Cup ===
The same day the Championship fixture list was released, the draw for the first round of the EFL Cup took place; Fulham were drawn away to Leyton Orient. In the next round they were drawn at home to Middlesbrough.

8 August 2016 1	Leyton Orient	2–3	Fulham	Brisbane Road, London
19:45 BST	Pollock (yellow card) 28'; McCallum 73', 81'	Report	Adeniran 29', (yellow card) 30'; Woodrow 51', 54'	Attendance: 3,855; Referee: Andy Davies

24 August 2016 2	Fulham	2–1 (a.e.t.)	Middlesbrough	Craven Cottage, London
19:45 BST	Adeniran (yellow card) 15'; De Sart 54' (o.g.); Kavanagh (yellow card) 72'; Stearman (yellow card) 79'; Christensen 113'	Report	Nugent 8'; Ayala (yellow card) 32'	Attendance: 8,522; Referee: David Coote

21 September 2016 3	Fulham	1–2	Bristol City	Craven Cottage, London
19:45 BST	Piazon 14'; Woodrow (penalty missed) 51'; Joronen (yellow card) 54'	Report	Pack (yellow card) 28'; Wilbraham 45'; Moore (yellow card) 51'; Abraham 90'	Attendance: 6,017; Referee: Andy Davies

=== FA Cup ===
8 January 2017 3	Cardiff City	1–2	Fulham	Cardiff City Stadium, Cardiff
11:30 GMT	Pilkington 8'	Report	Johansen 14'; Sessegnon 33'	Attendance: 5,199; Referee: Andy Woolmer
Note: Live on BBC One (Wales region only)

29 January 2017 4	Fulham	4–1	Hull City	Craven Cottage, London
12:30 GMT	Aluko 17'; McDonald (yellow card) 36'; Martin 54'; Sessegnon 66'; Johansen (yellow card) 74', (goal) 78'; Kalas (yellow card) 86'	Report	Maguire (yellow card) 32'; Evandro 49'; Hernández (penalty missed) 87', 87'; Marković (yellow card) 90+2'	Attendance: 15,143; Referee: Paul Tierney

19 February 2017 5	Fulham	0–3	Tottenham Hotspur	Craven Cottage, London
14:00 GMT		Report	Kane 16', 51', 73'	Attendance: 22,557; Referee: Robert Madley
Note: Live on BBC One

== Squad statistics ==
=== Appearances and goals ===
Last updated 13 May 2017.

- Players listed with no appearances have been in the matchday squad but only as unused substitutes.

No.	Pos	Nat	Player	Total		Championship		Play Offs		EFL Cup		FA Cup	
No.	Pos	Nat	Player	Apps	Goals	Apps	Goals	Apps	Goals	Apps	Goals	Apps	Goals
1	GK	(England) ENG	Marcus Bettinelli	11	0	6+0	0	2+0	0	0+0	0	3+0	0
2	DF	(England) ENG	Ryan Fredericks	33	0	25+4	0	2+0	0	0+0	0	1+1	0
3	DF	(England) ENG	Scott Malone	42	6	34+2	6	2+0	0	2+0	0	1+1	0
4	DF	(Belgium) BEL	Denis Odoi	32	2	21+8	2	0+0	0	0+0	0	3+0	0
6	MF	(Scotland) SCO	Kevin McDonald	48	3	43+0	3	2+0	0	0+0	0	3+0	0
7	MF	(Democratic Republic of the Congo) COD	Neeskens Kebano	31	6	12+16	6	0+1	0	0+1	0	1+0	0
8	MF	(England) ENG	Scott Parker	28	0	12+14	0	0+0	0	1+0	0	0+1	0
9	FW	(Ivory Coast) CIV	Cyriac (on loan from Oostende)	10	1	0+8	1	0+1	0	0+0	0	0+1	0
10	MF	(Scotland) SCO	Tom Cairney	51	13	44+1	12	2+0	1	0+1	0	3+0	0
11	MF	(Togo) TOG	Floyd Ayité	34	9	22+8	9	2+0	0	0+0	0	1+1	0
13	DF	(United States) USA	Tim Ream	41	1	29+4	1	2+0	0	3+0	0	3+0	0
14	MF	(Norway) NOR	Stefan Johansen	42	13	35+1	11	2+0	0	1+0	0	3+0	2
15	DF	(Austria) AUT	Michael Madl	17	0	14+2	0	0+0	0	1+0	0	0+0	0
17	DF	(Iceland) ISL	Ragnar Sigurðsson	18	1	15+2	1	0+0	0	0+0	0	1+0	0
20	FW	(Brazil) BRA	Lucas Piazon (on loan from Chelsea)	33	6	20+9	5	0+1	0	1+0	1	2+0	0
24	FW	(Nigeria) NGR	Sone Aluko	50	9	44+1	8	2+0	0	0+0	0	3+0	1
25	FW	(Scotland) SCO	Chris Martin (on loan from Derby County)	34	11	27+4	10	1+1	0	0+0	0	1+0	1
26	DF	(Czech Republic) CZE	Tomáš Kalas (on loan from Chelsea)	40	1	36+0	1	2+0	0	0+0	0	2+0	0
27	GK	(England) ENG	David Button	40	0	40+0	0	0+0	0	0+0	0	0+0	0
30	DF	(England) ENG	Ryan Sessegnon	30	7	17+8	5	0+1	0	1+0	0	2+1	2
33	MF	(Greece) GRE	Thanos Petsos (on loan from Werder Bremen)	1	0	0+0	0	0+0	0	0+0	0	0+1	0
35	MF	(England) ENG	Dennis Adeniran	5	1	0+1	0	0+0	0	3+0	1	0+1	0
36	MF	(United States) USA	Luca de la Torre	3	0	0+0	0	0+0	0	1+2	0	0+0	0
37	DF	(England) ENG	Tayo Edun	3	0	0+0	0	0+0	0	3+0	0	0+0	0
41	GK	(Finland) FIN	Jesse Joronen	3	0	0+0	0	0+0	0	3+0	0	0+0	0
99	DF	(Serbia) SRB	Andrija Lazović	46	0	46+0	0	0+0	0	0+0	0		
Out on loan
5	DF	(England) ENG	Richard Stearman (on loan at Wolverhampton Wanderers)	2	0	0+0	0	0+0	0	2+0	0	0+0	0
16	FW	(England) ENG	Cauley Woodrow (on loan at Burton Albion)	8	2	1+4	0	0+0	0	3+0	2	0+0	0
19	MF	(England) ENG	Ryan Tunnicliffe (on loan at Wigan Athletic)	10	0	3+4	0	0+0	0	2+1	0	0+0	0
21	MF	(Denmark) DEN	Lasse Vigen Christensen (on loan at Burton Albion)	7	1	0+4	0	0+0	0	3+0	1	0+0	0
23	MF	(Spain) ESP	Jozabed (on loan at Celta Vigo)	8	0	1+6	0	0+0	0	1+0	0	0+0	0
28	DF	(Scotland) SCO	Jack Grimmer (on loan at Shrewsbury Town)	1	0	0+0	0	0+0	0	1+0	0	0+0	0
31	FW	(England) ENG	Stephen Humphrys (on loan at Shrewsbury Town)	3	0	0+2	0	0+0	0	0+0	0	0+1	0
32	MF	(Republic of Ireland) IRL	Sean Kavanagh (on loan at Hartlepool United)	2	0	0+0	0	0+0	0	1+1	0	0+0	0
Left during season
9	FW	(England) ENG	Matt Smith (joined Queens Park Rangers)	14	2	7+6	2	0+0	0	0+1	0	0+0	0

=== Top scorers ===
Includes all competitive matches. The list is sorted by squad number when total goals are equal.

Last updated 13 May 2017.

Rank	No.	Nationality	Player	Championship	EFL Cup	FA Cup	Total
1
1	10	(Scotland)	Tom Cairney	13	0	0	13
1	14	(Norway)	Stefan Johansen	11	0	2	13
3
3	25	(Scotland)	Chris Martin	10	0	1	11
4
4	11	(Togo)	Floyd Ayité	9	0	0	9
4	24	(Nigeria)	Sone Aluko	8	0	1	9
6
6	30	(England)	Ryan Sessegnon	5	0	2	7
7
7	3	(England)	Scott Malone	6	0	0	6
7	7	(Democratic Republic of the Congo)	Neeskens Kebano	6	0	0	6
7	20	(Brazil)	Lucas Piazon	5	1	0	6
10
10	6	(Scotland)	Kevin McDonald	3	0	0	3
11
11	4	(Belgium)	Denis Odoi	2	0	0	2
11	9	(England)	Matt Smith	2	0	0	2
11	16	(England)	Cauley Woodrow	0	2	0	2
14
14	9	(Ivory Coast)	Cyriac	1	0	0	1
14	13	(United States)	Tim Ream	1	0	0	1
14	17	(Iceland)	Ragnar Sigurðsson	1	0	0	1
14	21	(Denmark)	Lasse Vigen Christensen	0	1	0	1
14	26	(Czech Republic)	Tomáš Kalas	1	0	0	1
14	35	(England)	Dennis Adeniran	0	1	0	1
Own goals				2	1	0	3
TOTALS				85	6	6	97

=== Disciplinary record ===
Includes all competitive matches. The list is sorted by position, and then shirt number.

N	P	Nat.	Name	Championship			EFL Cup			FA Cup			Total			Notes
N	P	Nat.	Name	Yellow card	Second yellow card	Red card	Yellow card	Second yellow card	Red card	Yellow card	Second yellow card	Red card	Yellow card	Second yellow card	Red card	Notes
1	GK	(England)	Marcus Bettinelli	1									1			
2	DF	(England)	Ryan Fredericks	8		1							8		1	
3	DF	(England)	Scott Malone	8									8			
4	DF	(Belgium)	Denis Odoi	5									5			
6	MF	(Scotland)	Kevin McDonald	13		1				1			14		1	
8	MF	(England)	Scott Parker	5									5			
10	MF	(Scotland)	Tom Cairney	5									5			
11	MF	(Togo)	Floyd Ayité	1									1			
13	DF	(United States)	Tim Ream	3									3			
14	MF	(Norway)	Stefan Johansen	9						1			10			
15	DF	(Austria)	Michael Madl	4	1								4	1		
17	DF	(Iceland)	Ragnar Sigurðsson	2									2			
20	MF	(Brazil)	Lucas Piazon	4									4			(on loan from Chelsea)
24	DF	(Nigeria)	Sone Aluko	5									5			
25	FW	(Scotland)	Chris Martin	5		1							5		1	(on loan from Derby County)
26	DF	(Czech Republic)	Tomáš Kalas	1						1			2			(on loan from Chelsea)
27	GK	(England)	David Button	2									2			
35	MF	(England)	Dennis Adeniran				2						2			
41	GK	(Finland)	Jesse Joronen				1						1			
Out on loan
5	DF	(England)	Richard Stearman				1						1			(on loan at Wolverhampton Wanderers)
32	MF	(Republic of Ireland)	Sean Kavanagh				1						1			(on loan at Hartlepool United)
Left during season
9	FW	(England)	Matt Smith	1									1			(joined Queens Park Rangers)
TOTALS				80	1	3	5	0	0	3	0	0	88	1	3	

Last updated: 13 May 2017
Source: EFL
Ordered by (red card) , (second yellow card) and (yellow card)
(yellow card) = Number of bookings; (second yellow card) = Number of sending offs after a second yellow card; (red card) = Number of sending offs by a direct red card.

==== Suspensions ====
Player	Date Received	Offence	Length of suspension	
Michael Madl	10 September 2016	(yellow card) (yellow-red card) vs Birmingham City	1 Match	Burton Albion (H) (Championship)
Kevin McDonald	24 September 2016	(red card) vs Bristol City	3 Matches	Nottingham Forest (A), Queens Park Rangers (H), Barnsley (A) (Championship)
Scott Parker	19 November 2016	Five (yellow card)	1 Match	Brighton and Hove Albion (A) (Championship)
Denis Odoi	26 November 2016	Five (yellow card)	1 Match	Reading (H) (Championship)
Ryan Fredericks	4 February 2017	(red card) vs Birmingham City	3 Matches	Wigan Athletic (H), Nottingham Forest (H) (Championship), Tottenham Hotspur (H) (FA Cup)
Chris Martin	14 April 2017	(red card) vs Norwich City	3 Matches	Aston Villa (H), Huddersfield Town (A), Brentford (H) (Championship)

Last updated: 25 April 2017.
Source: Football Association
