= Scott Malone =

English footballer (born 1991)

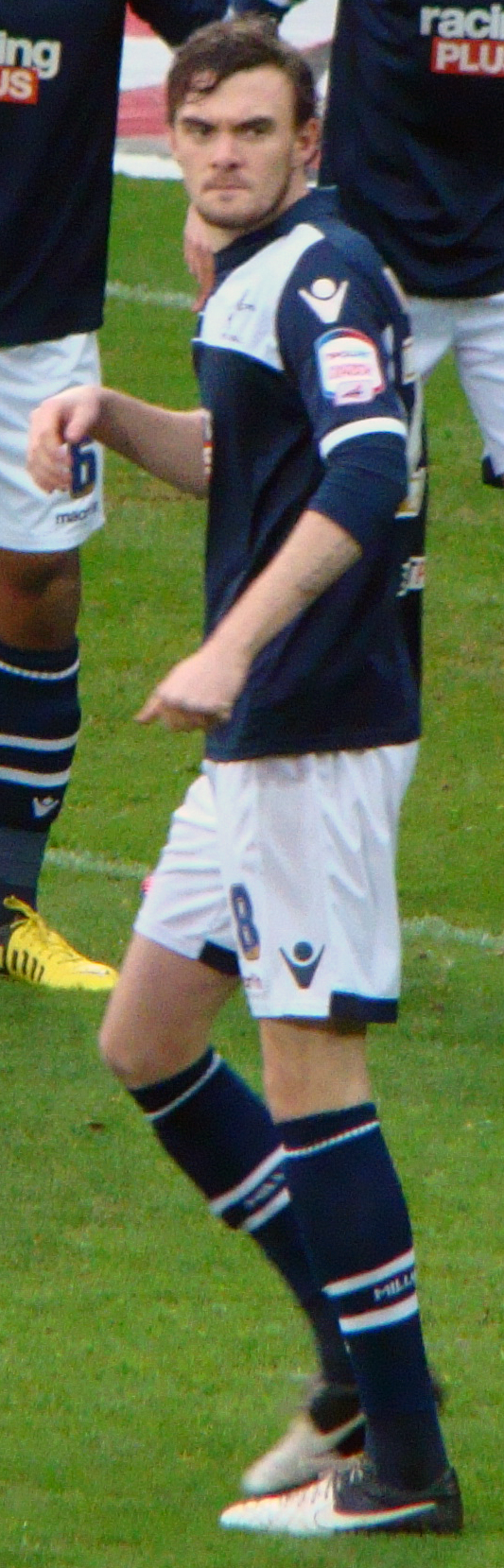
- Malone playing for Millwall

Personal information
- Full name: Scott Liam Malone
- Date of birth: 25 March 1991 (age 35)
- Place of birth: Rowley Regis, England
- Height: 1.89 m (6 ft 2 in)
- Positions: Left back; left midfielder

Team information
- Current team: Three Bridges

Youth career
- Wolverhampton Wanderers

Senior career*
| Years | Team | Apps | (Gls) |
| 2009–2012 | Wolverhampton Wanderers | 0 | (0) |
| 2009 | → Újpest (loan) | 8 | (1) |
| 2009–2010 | → Southend United (loan) | 17 | (0) |
| 2010–2011 | → Burton Albion (loan) | 22 | (1) |
| 2011–2012 | → Bournemouth (loan) | 16 | (2) |
| 2012 | Bournemouth | 16 | (3) |
| 2012–2015 | Millwall | 68 | (5) |
| 2015–2016 | Cardiff City | 54 | (2) |
| 2016–2017 | Fulham | 36 | (6) |
| 2017–2018 | Huddersfield Town | 22 | (0) |
| 2018–2021 | Derby County | 45 | (3) |
| 2020–2021 | → Millwall (loan) | 41 | (5) |
| 2021–2023 | Millwall | 72 | (2) |
| 2023–2024 | Gillingham | 41 | (4) |
| 2024 | Crawley Town | 2 | (0) |
| 2025 | Cambridge United | 8 | (0) |
| 2025–2026 | Crawley Town | 16 | (1) |
| 2026– | Three Bridges | 3 | (1) |

International career
| 2009–2010 | England U19 | 6 | (0) |
- * Club domestic league appearances and goals as of 20:07, 7 October 2026 (UTC)

Scott Liam Malone (born 25 March 1991) is an English professional footballer who plays as a left back or left-sided midfielder for Isthmian League Premier Division club Three Bridges.

Malone came through Wolverhampton Wanderers' academy to turn professional in 2009. Although he never played a first team match for the club, he had a series of loan moves while a Wolves player, culminating in a move to Bournemouth that became a permanent transfer in January 2012.

Malone signed for Millwall in May 2012, the first of a string of four clubs that he would play for in his 11-year Championship level career, the others being Cardiff City, Fulham and Derby County. He would play for one season in the Premier League at newly promoted Huddersfield Town in 2017-18.

2023 saw a return to League Two with a season at Gillingham. A return to League One football the following year proved to be short-lived, when he left Crawley Town in November 2024 by mutual consent and moved to Cambridge United in April 2025. He played in League Two for Crawley Town in 2025–26.

== Club career ==
=== Wolverhampton Wanderers ===
Born in Rowley Regis, England, Malone is a product of Wolves' academy, having joined the club at the age of nine, and signed a professional contract with the club in February 2009, aged 18. He immediately departed for a spell on loan at Hungarian club Újpest, a partner club of Wolves, and made his Újpest debut, in a 2–0 win over Siófok on 7 March 2009. Malone then scored his first Újpest goal on 24 April 2009, in a 3–0 win over Budapest Honvéd. Malone went on to make eight appearances, scoring once, and helped them finish second in the Nemzeti Bajnokság I and to qualify for the newly formed UEFA Europa League. During this season, he also won Wolves' Academy Player of the Season Award.

Malone joined League One club Southend United on loan on 24 November 2009. Malone made his Southend United debut on the same day, where he made his first start, in a 2–0 loss against Tranmere Rovers. Then on 12 December 2009, Malone provided an assist for Francis Laurent to score the first goal of the game against Hartlepool United as they went on to win 3–2. Malone established himself in the first team, playing in the left–back position. After extending his loan spell for another month, it was subsequently later extended until the end of the 2009–10 season. Despite suffering an injury, Malone made 17 appearances in total for the Shrimpers during a campaign that ended in relegation. After his loan spell at Southend United came to an end, Malone signed a one–year contract extension with the club.

On 22 October 2010, Malone went out on loan again, joining League Two club Burton Albion on a one–month deal. Malone made his Burton Albion debut, the next day, playing 90 minutes, in a 3–0 win over Bradford City. During the match, Malone made an impressive display, helping the club keep a clean sheet and almost scored, earning him a Man of the Match Award. Having made 11 appearances so far, Malone's loan spell with the club was extended until the end of the season. Despite suffering from injuries, Malone scored his first goal in English football on 30 April 2011 in a 1–1 draw against former club Southend United and went on to make 22 appearances. Malone was linked with a return to Burton Albion on loan ahead of the 2011–12 season, but this was ruled out by Manager Paul Peschisolido and Malone, himself. Although Malone signed a new contract, Wolves put a price tag on Malone of about £150K.

=== AFC Bournemouth ===
On 18 July 2011, Malone joined League One side AFC Bournemouth on an initial six-month loan deal. He made his Bournemouth debut, in the opening game of the season, in a 3–0 loss against Charlton Athletic. Malone then scored three goals in three games between 29 October 2011 and 12 November 2011 against Preston North End, Scunthorpe United and Gillingham in the first round of FA Cup. After losing his place in the left–back position to Warren Cummings, Malone was moved into an unfamiliar left–midfield role by manager Lee Bradbury.

After becoming a regular player for the Cherries, a permanent transfer was agreed on 23 December 2011, and, upon the re-opening of the transfer in January 2012, Malone formally signed a three-and-a-half-year contract for an undisclosed fee, believed to be £150,000.

However, Malone suffered a hamstring injury that kept him out for between two and three weeks, but sidelined for a lot longer. Malone scored in his first game after signing for the club on a permanent basis and set up a goal for Matt Tubbs, in a 2–0 win over Exeter City on 7 February 2012. Malone scored two more goals, as the season progressed, against Stevenage and Huddersfield Town. Malone later finished the 2011–12 season, making thirty–two appearances and scoring five times.

=== Millwall ===
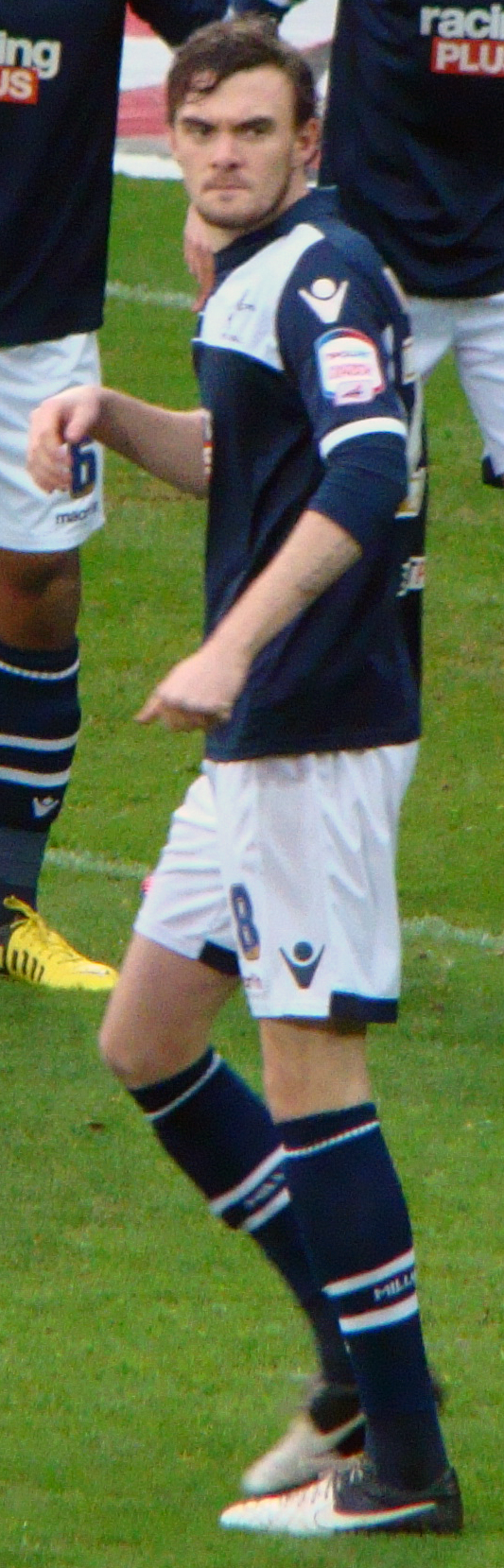
Malone playing for Millwall against his future club, Cardiff City on 26 December 2012.

On 30 May 2012, Malone joined Millwall in a move that included former Cherries player Josh McQuoid returning to Bournemouth as part of a swap deal. But Malone left Bournemouth on a bad note when he made a comment that made a "section of Bournemouth supporters" upset. Upon joining the club, Malone was given a number 28 shirt ahead of the 2011–12 season.

Malone made his Millwall debut for the club, in the first round of League Cup, against Crawley Town and played the whole 120 minutes of the match, including extra time, but Millwall were eliminated after losing 5–2 in a penalty shoot–out. Malone made his league debut, in the opening game of the season, in a 2–0 loss against Blackpool and scored in the next game, in a 2–1 win over Peterborough United three days later on 21 August 2012. However, Malone struggled to establish himself in the first team, as he spent most of the season on the substitute bench, as well as, his own injury concern. Malone finished his first season at Millwall, making 16 appearances and scoring once in all competitions.

In the 2013–14 season, Malone continued to be in the sidelined at the start of the season and made his first appearance of the season, playing as a left–back, in a 3–1 win over Blackpool on 17 September 2013. Two weeks after his making return, Malone scored his first Millwall goal, in a 2–0 win over Leeds United. During a 2–2 draw against Burnley on 2 November 2013, Malone suffered an injury that saw him substituted after just seven minutes and, after undergoing a scan, it was found that he did not have any damage to his ligament. After weeks on the sidelines, Malone made his return to the first team, in a 1–0 win over Barnsley on 23 November 2013. Malone continued to suffer from injury, as the season progressed. A week after making his return, Malone scored his third goal for the club, in a 2–1 win over Nottingham Forest on 5 April 2014. At the end of the 2013–14 Championship season Scott Malone came second in the club "Player of the Year" after a string of impressive performances, including a performance at QPR, in which he scored a 91st-minute equaliser in a 1–1 draw on 26 April 2014. This was later ranked number nine as the key moment of the 2013–14 campaign for Millwall. Despite this, Malone finished the 2013–14 season, making 33 appearances and scoring two times.

In the 2014–15 season, Malone continued to be a first team regular and scored his first goal of the season in a 2–1 win over Blackpool on 30 August 2014. However, Malone suffered his own injury concerns, from which he managed to recover and regain his first team place. Despite Millwall's struggles, Malone's performance attracted interest from Cardiff City, who had their bid from Millwall accepted.

Malone returned to Millwall in August 2020. Initially on loan from Derby County for the 2020–21 season, he went on to sign a further contract with Millwall from July 2021.

=== Cardiff City ===
Malone signed a two-and-a-half-year deal with Championship rivals' Cardiff City on 8 January 2015. Malone was previously linked with a move to Bundesliga side Borussia Dortmund, who made a bid for him before going to Cardiff City.

Two days after signing for the club, Malone made his Cardiff City debut, where he made his first start, in a 1–0 win over Fulham. Malone then provided assist for Kenwyne Jones to score an opener, in a 1–1 draw against Sheffield Wednesday on 7 February 2015. However, Malone suffered injuries as the 2014–15 season progressed. Malone ended the half of the 2014–15 season with Cardiff City, making thirteen appearances.

In the 2015–16 season, Malone started well when he scored an equaliser against Queens Park Rangers in a 2–2 draw. He was named as Man of the Match by the fans, with his performance in "[running] up and down the left flank like a midfielder" praised. This was followed by his second in a 3–2 win away to Bolton Wanderers. Malone went on to establish himself in the left–back position and went on to make forty–one appearances and scoring twice, having missed five games, due to four on the substitute bench and one over illness.

With his contract expiring at the end of the 2015–16 season, Malone's future at Cardiff City was in doubt, especially with the new management of Paul Trollope. However, Malone was expected not to be included in the first team ahead of the 2016–17 season, due to the pre-season form of Declan John.

=== Fulham ===
On 19 July 2016, Malone joined Championship side Fulham on a two-year deal in a swap deal with Jazz Richards joining Cardiff.

Malone made his Fulham debut, in the opening game of the season, where he made his first start and played 85 minutes, in a 1–0 win over Newcastle United. Two weeks later, on 20 August 2016, Malone played against his former club, Cardiff City, in a 2–2 draw. Malone played a vital role for Fulham against Middlesbrough in the second round of EFL Cup when he provided a double assist, in a 2–1 win and after the match, Malone was voted Man of the Match by fans. Malone scored his first goal for Fulham in a 4–2 win against Barnsley on 15 October 2016. On 22 April 2017, Malone scored Fulham's equalising goal in an away game against eventual play-off winners Huddersfield Town, with Fulham coming back from 1–0 down to comfortably win 4–1.

Malone played in both legs of Fulham's Championship play-off semi-final against Reading, on 13 May and 16 May 2017 respectively, with Fulham losing 2–1 on aggregate.

=== Huddersfield Town ===
On 5 July 2017, Malone joined Premier League club Huddersfield Town for an undisclosed fee, signing a three-year deal with the club. He made his debut for the club in a 2–1 victory over Rotherham United in the English League Cup.

=== Derby County ===
On 8 August 2018, Malone returned to the Championship by signing for Derby County for an undisclosed fee, signing a three-year deal with the club. He scored his first goal for Derby against West Bromwich Albion on 24 October 2018. After a loan spell to Millwall in the 2020–21 season, on 14 June 2021 it was announced that he would leave Derby at the end of the season, following the expiry of his contract.

=== Return to Millwall ===
Having played for Millwall in the 2020-21 season on loan from Derby County. He scored the only goal in a match against his former club Huddersfield Town on 20 January 2021. On 28 August 2021, Malone returned to Millwall on a free transfer following his release from Derby County. Malone spent a further two years back at The Den featuring 72 times, netting twice. He was released following the expiration of his contract at the end of the 2022–23 season.

=== Gillingham ===
On 24 July 2023, Malone signed for EFL League Two side Gillingham on a free transfer, following his departure from Millwall, after having a successful trial during pre-season. On 3 October 2023 Malone took on captaining duties for Gillingham in the match against Crewe Alexandra, and has captained several times since. On 15 May 2024, the club put him on the transfer list.

=== Crawley Town ===
On 28 June 2024, Malone joined newly-promoted League One side Crawley Town for an undisclosed fee, signing a one-year deal.

On 10 November 2024, he departed the club having had his contract terminated by mutual consent.

=== Cambridge United ===
On 4 March 2025, Malone signed for League One side Cambridge United on a short-term deal until the end of the 2024-25 season. Malone was released at the end of the season after 8 appearances for the side.

=== Return to Crawley Town ===
In August 2025 Malone had signed a one-year contract with Crawley Town. He was injured during his eighth match of the season playing against Fleetwood Town on 8 November 2025. He was out of action for three months, returning to training on 5 February 2026. He returned to the matchday squad against Swindon on 7 March 2026. He was released at the end of the 2025–26 season.

=== Three Bridges ===
In August 2026, Malone signed for Isthmian Premier League side Three Bridges. On 29 August 2026 he scored his first goal for the club and won man of the match in a 2-2 draw against Dulwich Hamlet. He left the club after 3 matches to ensure that under FA transfer rules he could be available to sign for a League Two club in 2026 and briefly attended a training camp for free agents run by the Professional Footballer's Association. In October 2026, he returned to Three Bridges.

== International career ==
In late–August, Malone received his first call–up by England U19 and made his England U19 debut on 10 September 2009, in a 3–1 win over Russia U19 and went on to make six appearances for England U19. In February 2011, he was called–up by England U20, but was forced to withdraw from the squad after suffering tonsillitis.

== Career statistics ==
As of 24 May 2026

Appearances and goals by club, season and competition
| Club | Season | League | | | National Cup | | League Cup | | Other | | Total | |
| Club | Season | Division | Apps | Goals | Apps | Goals | Apps | Goals | Apps | Goals | Apps | Goals |
|---|---|---|---|---|---|---|---|---|---|---|---|---|
| Southend United | 2009–10 | League One | 17 | 0 | 0 | 0 | 0 | 0 | 0 | 0 | 17 | 0 |
| Burton Albion | 2010–11 | League Two | 22 | 1 | 4 | 0 | 0 | 0 | 0 | 0 | 26 | 1 |
| Bournemouth | 2011–12 | League One | 32 | 5 | 2 | 1 | 2 | 0 | 1 (Note: Appearances in EFL Trophy) | 0 | 37 | 6 |
| Millwall | 2012–13 | Championship | 15 | 1 | 0 | 0 | 1 | 0 | 0 | 0 | 16 | 1 |
| Millwall | 2013–14 | Championship | 33 | 3 | 0 | 0 | 2 | 0 | 0 | 0 | 35 | 3 |
| Millwall | 2014–15 | Championship | 20 | 1 | 0 | 0 | 0 | 0 | 0 | 0 | 20 | 1 |
| Cardiff City | 2014–15 | Championship | 13 | 0 | 1 | 0 | 0 | 0 | 0 | 0 | 14 | 0 |
| Cardiff City | 2015–16 | Championship | 41 | 2 | 1 | 0 | 0 | 0 | 0 | 0 | 42 | 1 |
| Cardiff City | Total | | 54 | 2 | 2 | 0 | 0 | 0 | 0 | 0 | 56 | 1 |
| Fulham | 2016–17 | Championship | 36 | 6 | 2 | 0 | 2 | 0 | 2 (Note: Appearances in Championship play-offs) | 0 | 42 | 6 |
| Huddersfield Town | 2017–18 | Premier League | 22 | 0 | 4 | 0 | 2 | 0 | 0 | 0 | 28 | 0 |
| Derby County | 2018–19 | Championship | 27 | 2 | 3 | 0 | 3 | 0 | 2 | 0 | 35 | 2 |
| Derby County | 2019–20 | Championship | 18 | 1 | 3 | 0 | 0 | 0 | 0 | 0 | 21 | 1 |
| Derby County | Total | | 45 | 3 | 6 | 0 | 3 | 0 | 2 | 0 | 56 | 3 |
| Millwall | 2020–21 | Championship | 41 | 5 | 1 | 0 | 1 | 1 | 0 | 0 | 43 | 6 |
| Millwall | 2021–22 | Championship | 39 | 2 | 1 | 0 | 1 | 1 | 0 | 0 | 41 | 3 |
| Millwall | 2022–23 | Championship | 33 | 0 | 0 | 0 | 1 | 0 | 0 | 0 | 34 | 0 |
| Millwall | Total | | 181 | 12 | 2 | 0 | 6 | 2 | 0 | 0 | 189 | 14 |
| Gillingham | 2023–24 | League Two | 41 | 4 | 3 | 0 | 2 | 0 | 2 | 0 | 48 | 4 |
| Crawley Town | 2024–25 | League One | 2 | 0 | – | | 1 | 0 | – | | 3 | 0 |
| Cambridge United | 2024–25 | League One | 8 | 0 | – | | – | | – | | 8 | 0 |
| Crawley Town | 2025–26 | League Two | 16 | 1 | 1 | 0 | – | | 2 | 0 | 19 | 1 |
| Crawley Town | Total | | 18 | 1 | 1 | 0 | 1 | 0 | 2 | 0 | 22 | 1 |
| Career Total | | | 476 | 34 | 26 | 1 | 18 | 2 | 9 | 0 | 529 | 37 |

== Honours ==
Individual

- Wolverhampton Wanderers Academy Player of the Season: 2008–09
