= Cauley Woodrow =

English footballer (born 1994)

- Woodrow in 2026 with Wycombe Wanderers

Personal information
- Date of birth: 2 December 1994 (age 31)
- Place of birth: Hemel Hempstead, England
- Height: 6 ft 0 in (1.84 m)
- Position: Forward

Team information
- Current team: Wycombe Wanderers
- Number: 12

Youth career
- Tottenham Hotspur
- 2007–2008: Buckhurst Hill
- 2008–2010: Luton Town

Senior career*
| Years | Team | Apps | (Gls) |
| 2010–2011 | Luton Town | 0 | (0) |
| 2011–2019 | Fulham | 54 | (8) |
| 2013–2014 | → Southend United (loan) | 19 | (2) |
| 2017 | → Burton Albion (loan) | 14 | (5) |
| 2017–2018 | → Bristol City (loan) | 14 | (2) |
| 2018–2019 | → Barnsley (loan) | 10 | (4) |
| 2019–2022 | Barnsley | 131 | (42) |
| 2022–2026 | Luton Town | 67 | (3) |
| 2025 | → Blackburn Rovers (loan) | 9 | (0) |
| 2025–2026 | → Wycombe Wanderers (loan) | 37 | (9) |
| 2026– | Wycombe Wanderers | 8 | (2) |

International career
| 2011 | England U17 | 3 | (1) |
| 2014 | England U20 | 5 | (2) |
| 2015–2017 | England U21 | 9 | (3) |
- * Club domestic league appearances and goals as of 11 October 2026 (UTC)

Cauley Woodrow (born 2 December 1994) is an English professional footballer who plays as a forward for EFL League One club Wycombe Wanderers.

Woodrow began his professional career at Luton Town, in the Conference Premier at the time, for whom he made three appearances in the FA Trophy as a 16-year-old. While a Luton player in 2011, he became the first non-League footballer to be capped at youth level for England since the 1970s.

In 2011, he moved to Fulham, making his Football League debut on loan at Southend United in 2013. After several loan spells, he was signed by Barnsley in 2018 on an initial loan. After spending four years in total at Barnsley, he returned to Luton Town in 2022, helping the club return to the top flight in his first season back. He spent the second half of the 2024–25 season on loan at Blackburn Rovers.

== Club career ==
=== Early life and career ===
Woodrow was born in Hemel Hempstead, Hertfordshire, where he attended Hemel Hempstead School. His father, Martin Patching, was a professional footballer. As a young boy, Woodrow trained with Tottenham Hotspur. He joined Buckhurst Hill ahead of the 2007–08 season. He scored eight goals in one of his early games, and played in the team that represented the South of England in the national finals of the Tesco Cup in 2008. Although his team lost in the semi-final, Woodrow received the award for best forward in the competition.

He went on to join Conference Premier club Luton Town. In the summer of 2010, he was part of their under-15 team that reached the final of a 40-team tournament involving several major European clubs' youngsters, and in September he scored six goals in an FA Youth Cup qualifying match against Cogenhoe United. While still 15, he was an unused substitute for the FA Cup match at Corby Town, and he made his senior debut on 14 December, twelve days after his 16th birthday, as Luton won an FA Trophy first-round replay at Welling United. Woodrow played twice more in the FA Trophy: against Uxbridge, he set up the third goal in a 4–0 win, and against Gloucester City, he won the free kick from which Luton scored the only goal of the game to progress to the quarter-final. He was called up to the England under-17 team for a tournament in Portugal in February 2011.

=== Fulham ===
==== Early Fulham career ====
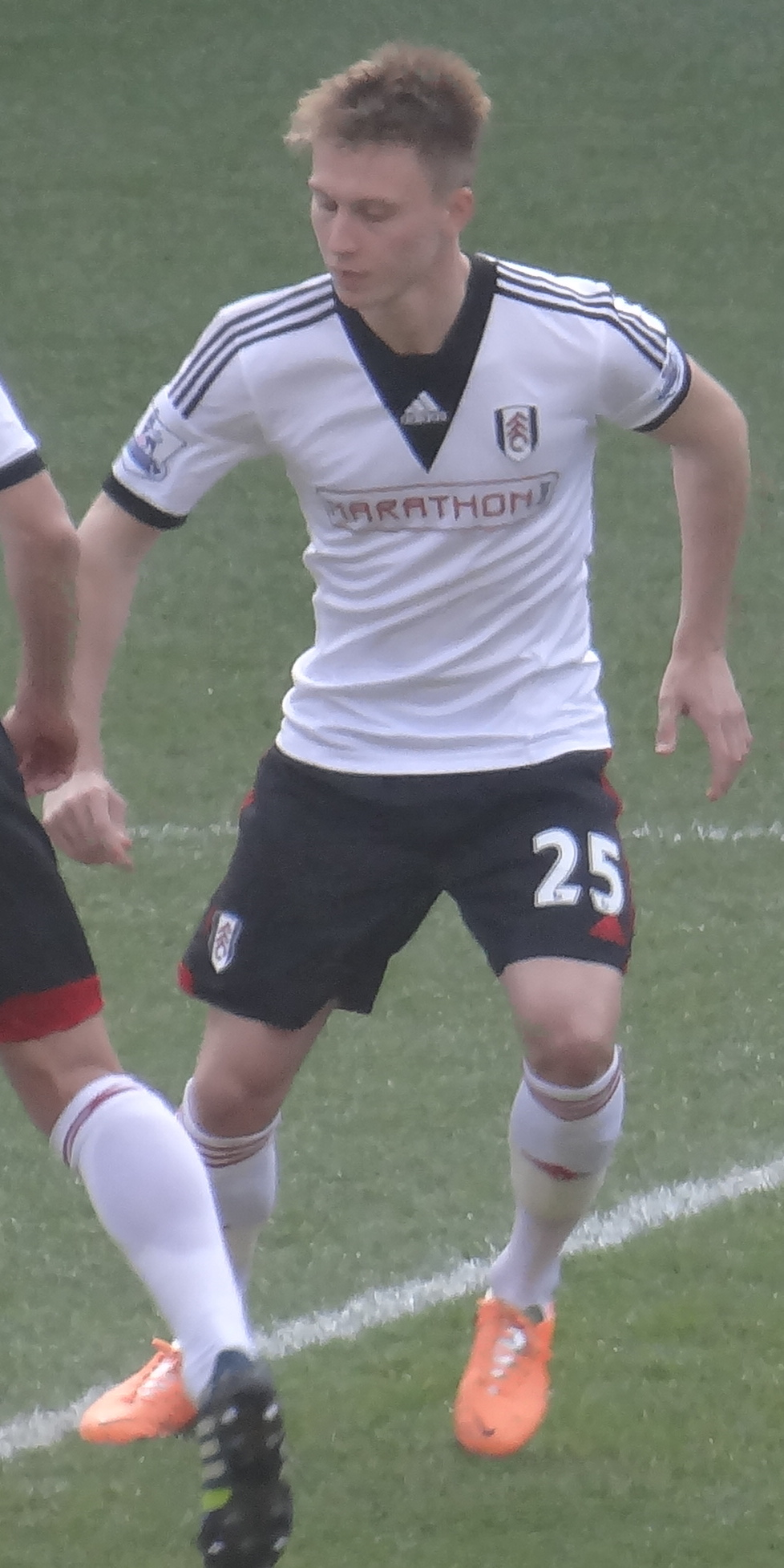
Woodrow playing for Fulham in 2014

In March 2011, Woodrow signed for Premier League club Fulham for a "six-figure" fee, possibly rising to seven figures depending on the player's future progress; the deal included what Luton's managing director described as "a very healthy sell-on clause". He took up a scholarship with the club in July, after he left school, and signed a two-and-a-half-year professional contract on his 17th birthday. Although injury interrupted his first season, he was still able to contribute to the under-18 team winning the 2011–12 Premier Academy League – he scored in the final as Fulham beat Blackburn Rovers 2–1, scored twice as Fulham came from behind to eliminate Manchester City from the 2011–12 FA Youth Cup at the last 16 stage, played for the reserve team, and occasionally trained with the first team. A December 2012 feature on Fulham's website listed his strengths as "scoring goals, clever movement and awareness around the box".

Woodrow was a member of Fulham's under-19 team at the 2013 Dallas Cup. He had a penalty saved but still scored twice as his team beat Kashiwa Reysol's youngsters 5–1 to win the tournament. He captained Fulham's under-18s to a second successive Premier Academy League title in 2013. Ahead of the 2013–14 season, Woodrow signed a contract extension until 2016.

Woodrow made his Premier League debut on 8 March 2014, playing 75 minutes of Fulham's 3–1 defeat to Cardiff City at the Cardiff City Stadium, and scored his first goal for the club in a 2–2 draw against Crystal Palace on the final day of the season.

==== Southend United loan ====
He joined League Two club Southend United on 2 September 2013 on a one-month loan, and went straight into the starting eleven to make his Football League debut five days later, in a 3–1 home defeat to Morecambe. He played the first hour of the match, and came close to scoring with a header. After two starts and two substitute appearances, Woodrow's loan was extended for a further 28 days. He scored his first senior goals in the Football League Trophy against Dagenham & Redbridge on 8 October. Brought on at half-time with Southend a goal behind, he headed the equaliser from Ben Coker's cross after just six minutes on the field, and three minutes later gave his side the lead when the goalkeeper could only parry Brian Saah's shot.

The loan was extended in November until 4 May 2014, with a further extension if Southend were to reach the play-offs. Woodrow was sent off for elbowing an opponent only four minutes after entering the match at Portsmouth as a second-half substitute. Despite the numerical disadvantage, Southend came back from a goal behind at the time of the incident to win 2–1. On Boxing Day 2013, Woodrow scored a 75th-minute winner in a 1–0 victory away to AFC Wimbledon after coming off the bench. His loan spell was cut short on 29 January 2014, as Fulham were disappointed with the number of games he had started for Southend.

==== Further loans ====
Having started only one league match for Fulham in the 2016–17 season, Woodrow joined another Championship club, Burton Albion, on 27 January 2017 on loan until the end of the season. He scored his first goal for the club a 2–1 win over Wolverhampton Wanderers on 4 February 2017, with a close-range shot in the fourth minute of stoppage time in.

Woodrow signed a season-long loan with Bristol City on 17 August 2017. He scored his first goal for Bristol City in a 4–1 win against Derby County on 16 September 2017.

=== Barnsley ===
Woodrow joined League One club Barnsley on 24 August 2018 on loan until January 2019, ahead of a proposed permanent transfer. He signed for Barnsley permanently on 3 January 2019 on a two-and-a-half-year contract, with the option of a further year in the club's favour, for an undisclosed fee.

He signed a new contract in May 2019, running until 2022.

=== Return to Luton Town ===
On 21 June 2022, Woodrow signed for Championship side Luton Town, returning after 11 years. He scored the winner during the Boxing Day fixture against Norwich City.

On 9 March 2024, Woodrow scored the tying goal in the 97th minute of a 1–1 draw against Crystal Palace at Selhurst Park, his second career Premier League goal and his first since 2014. Both of his Premier League goals had come against Crystal Palace.

==== Loan to Blackburn Rovers ====
On 3 February 2025, Woodrow joined fellow Championship club Blackburn Rovers on loan until the end of the season. He made 10 appearances in all competitions.

==== Loan to Wycombe Wanderers ====
On 1 September 2025, Woodrow joined fellow League One club Wycombe Wanderers on loan until the end of the season. He scored on his debut for a 2–0 win against Mansfield Town.

== International career ==
Woodrow was called up to the England under-17 team for the 2011 Algarve Tournament in February. When he made his debut, scoring the equalising goal in a 1–1 draw with Romania, he became the first non-League footballer to play for an England youth team since Bob Oates of Ashley Road in 1974. He played in England's other two matches in the tournament, against Germany and Portugal, as a second-half substitute.

Woodrow's next England callup came in May 2014; he was included in a mixed under-20/under-21 squad to face Wales U21 in a European Championship qualifier and to compete in that summer's Toulon Tournament. He was not involved with the U21 match, but played in all five of England U20's matches at Toulon, and scored twice, in 1–1 draws with South Korea and Colombia. England lost to Portugal in the third-place play-off. After forwards Patrick Bamford, Saido Berahino and Callum Wilson withdrew through injury from the England U21 squad for friendlies against the Czech Republic and Germany, Woodrow was called up, and made his U21 debut on 27 March 2015, playing the first hour of a 1–0 win against the Czechs. He was selected in the provisional squad for the 2015 Championship, but did not make the cut. Woodrow made three more appearances for England U21 later in 2015, and was included in the squad for the 2016 Toulon Tournament, which the Football Association were treating as an under-21 competition. He made three appearances in the group stage and scored twice, against Guinea, and was an unused substitute in the final as England beat France 2–1. He was a member of England's squad for the 2017 European Championships, at which he made one brief appearance, to help the team hold on to a 2–1 lead against Slovakia. That was his ninth and last appearance at under-21 level.

== Career statistics ==
As of match played 5 September 2026

Appearances and goals by club, season and competition
| Club | Season | League | | | FA Cup | | League Cup | | Other | | Total | |
| Club | Season | Division | Apps | Goals | Apps | Goals | Apps | Goals | Apps | Goals | Apps | Goals |
|---|---|---|---|---|---|---|---|---|---|---|---|---|
| Luton Town | 2010–11 | Conference Premier | 0 | 0 | 0 | 0 | — | | 3 (Note: Appearances in FA Trophy) | 0 | 3 | 0 |
| Fulham | 2011–12 | Premier League | 0 | 0 | 0 | 0 | 0 | 0 | 0 | 0 | 0 | 0 |
| Fulham | 2012–13 | Premier League | 0 | 0 | 0 | 0 | 0 | 0 | — | | 0 | 0 |
| Fulham | 2013–14 | Premier League | 6 | 1 | 0 | 0 | 0 | 0 | — | | 6 | 1 |
| Fulham | 2014–15 | Championship | 29 | 3 | 4 | 2 | 1 | 0 | — | | 34 | 5 |
| Fulham | 2015–16 | Championship | 14 | 4 | 1 | 0 | 2 | 0 | — | | 17 | 4 |
| Fulham | 2016–17 | Championship | 5 | 0 | 0 | 0 | 3 | 2 | — | | 8 | 2 |
| Fulham | 2017–18 | Championship | 0 | 0 | 0 | 0 | 1 | 0 | — | | 1 | 0 |
| Fulham | 2018–19 | Premier League | 0 | 0 | — | | — | | — | | 0 | 0 |
| Fulham | Total | | 54 | 8 | 5 | 2 | 7 | 2 | 0 | 0 | 66 | 12 |
| Southend United (loan) | 2013–14 | League Two | 19 | 2 | 1 | 0 | — | | 1 (Note: Appearance in Football League Trophy) | 2 | 21 | 4 |
| Burton Albion (loan) | 2016–17 | Championship | 14 | 5 | — | | — | | — | | 14 | 5 |
| Bristol City (loan) | 2017–18 | Championship | 14 | 2 | 1 | 0 | — | | — | | 15 | 2 |
| Barnsley (loan) | 2018–19 | League One | 10 | 4 | 2 | 3 | — | | 2 (Note: Appearances in EFL Trophy) | 0 | 14 | 7 |
| Barnsley | 2018–19 | League One | 21 | 12 | 1 | 0 | — | | — | | 22 | 12 |
| Barnsley | 2019–20 | Championship | 40 | 14 | 1 | 1 | 1 | 0 | — | | 42 | 15 |
| Barnsley | 2020–21 | Championship | 42 | 12 | 3 | 1 | 3 | 1 | 2 (Note: Appearances in EFL Championship play-offs) | 1 | 50 | 15 |
| Barnsley | 2021–22 | Championship | 28 | 4 | 0 | 0 | 1 | 0 | — | | 29 | 4 |
| Barnsley | Total | | 131 | 42 | 5 | 2 | 5 | 1 | 2 | 1 | 143 | 46 |
| Luton Town | 2022–23 | Championship | 27 | 2 | 4 | 1 | 1 | 0 | — | | 32 | 3 |
| Luton Town | 2023–24 | Premier League | 24 | 1 | 3 | 1 | 2 | 1 | — | | 29 | 3 |
| Luton Town | 2024–25 | Championship | 15 | 0 | 0 | 0 | 1 | 0 | — | | 16 | 0 |
| Luton Town | 2025–26 | League One | 1 | 0 | — | | 1 | 0 | — | | 2 | 0 |
| Luton Town | Total | | 67 | 3 | 7 | 2 | 5 | 1 | — | | 79 | 6 |
| Blackburn Rovers (loan) | 2024–25 | Championship | 9 | 0 | 1 | 0 | — | | — | | 10 | 0 |
| Wycombe Wanderers (loan) | 2025–26 | League One | 37 | 9 | 2 | 2 | 1 | 1 | 0 | 0 | 40 | 12 |
| Wycombe Wanderers | 2026–27 | League One | 4 | 2 | 0 | 0 | 1 | 0 | — | | 5 | 2 |
| Career total | | | 359 | 77 | 24 | 11 | 19 | 5 | 8 | 3 | 410 | 96 |

== Honours ==
Barnsley

- EFL League One runner-up: 2018–19

England U21

- Toulon Tournament: 2016
