= Michael Madl =

Austrian footballer

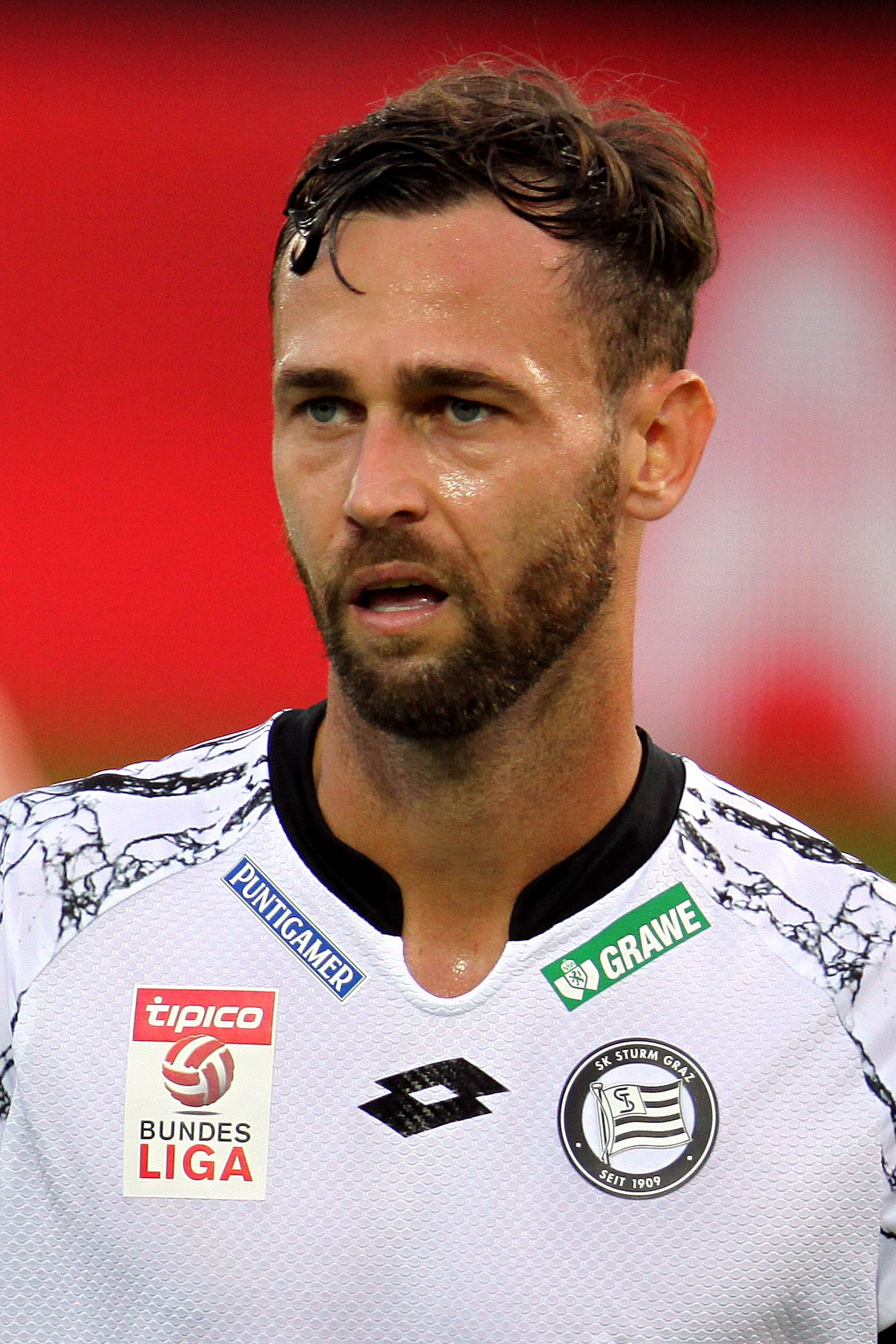
- Madl with SK Sturm Graz in 2015

Personal information
- Full name: Michael Madl
- Date of birth: March 21, 1988 (age 38)
- Place of birth: Judenburg, Austria
- Height: 1.81 m (5 ft 11 1/2 in)
- Position: Centre-back

Team information
- Current team: Austria Wien (academy coach)

Youth career
- 2006–2007: Austria Wien

Senior career*
Years	Team	Apps	(Gls)
2004–2010	Austria Wien	33	(0)
2007–2008	→ FC Wacker Innsbruck (loan)	21	(2)
2010–2012	SC Wiener Neustadt	54	(3)
2012–2016	SK Sturm Graz	111	(4)
2016	→ Fulham (loan)	13	(1)
2016–2018	Fulham	16	(0)
2018–2021	Austria Wien	74	(3)
Total		322	(13)

International career
2007–2008	Austria U20	8	(0)
2007–2008	Austria U21	11	(1)
2016	Austria	1	(0)

Managerial career
- 2021–: Austria Wien (academy)
- * Club domestic league appearances and goals

Michael Madl (born 21 March 1988) is an Austrian professional football coach and a former player who played as a defender. He works as a coach with the Austria Wien academy. He represented the Austria under-21 team.

== Club career ==
Madl joined FK Austria Wien in 2004. On 1 September 2007, he was transferred to FC Wacker Innsbruck on a ten-month loan. Madl returned to Austria Wien on 1 July 2008.

Maldl joined English club Fulham of the Championship on loan until the end of the 2015–16 season on 29 January 2016. He scored his first goal for Fulham in a 3–0 win over Charlton Athletic on 20 February 2016. On 20 May 2016, Fulham announced the signing of Madl on a permanent deal, with the player signing a two-year contract, keeping him at the club until the summer of 2018.

On 16 January 2018, Madl re-signed with Austria Wien for an undisclosed fee.

== International career ==
Madl was part of the Austrian team at the 2007 FIFA U-20 World Cup, where he helped his team to a fourth-place finish. He has been called up to the Austrian UEFA European Under-21 Championship Qualifying Squad.

Madl got his first call up to the senior Austria squad for a UEFA Euro 2016 qualifier against Russia in June 2015. He was called up again for another UEFA Euro 2016 qualifier against Liechtenstein in October 2015.

== Career statistics ==
=== Club ===
As of match played 8 April 2017

Appearances and goals by club, season and competition
Club	Season	League			National Cup		League Cup		Other		Total	
Club	Season	Division	Apps	Goals	Apps	Goals	Apps	Goals	Apps	Goals	Apps	Goals
Austria Wien	2008–09	Austrian Bundesliga	17	0	0	0	—		3 (Note: Appearances in the Europa League)	0	20	0
Austria Wien	2009–10	Austrian Bundesliga	1	0	0	0	—		1	0	2	0
Austria Wien	Austria Wien total		18	0	0	0	0	0	4	0	22	0
Austria Wien II	2009–10	Austrian First League	10	0	—		—		—		10	0
Wiener Neustadt	2010–11	Austrian Bundesliga	23	0	0	0	—		0	0	23	0
Wiener Neustadt	2011–12	Austrian Bundesliga	31	3	1	0	—		0	0	32	3
Wiener Neustadt	Wiener Neustadt total		54	3	1	0	—		0	0	55	3
Sturm Graz	2012–13	Austrian Bundesliga	33	1	3	0	—		0	0	36	1
Sturm Graz	2013–14	Austrian Bundesliga	28	1	5	0	—		2	0	35	1
Sturm Graz	2014–15	Austrian Bundesliga	32	1	3	0	—		0	0	35	1
Sturm Graz	2015–16	Austrian Bundesliga	18	1	2	0	—		2	0	22	1
Sturm Graz	Sturm Graz total		111	4	13	0	—		4	0	128	4
Fulham (loan)	2015–16	Championship	13	1	—		—		—		13	1
Fulham	2016–17	Championship	16	0	0	0	1	0	0	0	17	0
Career total			222	8	14	0	1	0	8	0	245	8
