= 2015–16 Fulham F.C. season =

Fulham
2015–16 season
- Chairman: Shahid Khan
- Manager: Kit Symons (until 8 November 2015); Peter Grant (caretaker) (from 21 November 2015 to 8 December 2015); Stuart Gray (Senior coach) (assumed managerial duties between 8 December 2015 and 29 December 2015); Slaviša Jokanović (announced 27 December 2015, assumed duties 30 December 2015)
- Stadium: Craven Cottage
- Championship: 20th
- FA Cup: Third round (lost to Sheffield Wednesday
- League Cup: Third round (lost to Stoke City)
- Top goalscorer: League: Ross McCormack (21); All: Ross McCormack (23)
- Highest home attendance: 20,316 (vs Bristol City, Championship, 12 March 2016)
- Lowest home attendance: 5,927 (vs Sheffield United, League Cup, 25 August 2015)
- Average home league attendance: 17,566
Home colours	Away colours	Third colours

The 2015–16 season was Fulham's 118th professional season and second consecutive season in the Championship. Along with competing in the Championship, the club also participated in the FA Cup and League Cup. The season covers the period from 1 July 2015 to 30 June 2016.

== Transfers ==
=== In ===
Date	Pos.	Name	Previous club	Fee	Source
19 June 2015	GK	(England) Andy Lonergan	(England) Bolton Wanderers	Free	
19 June 2015	MF	(England) Ben Pringle	(England) Rotherham United	Free	
26 June 2015	MF	(Scotland) Tom Cairney	(England) Blackburn Rovers	Undisclosed	
2 July 2015	DF	(Wales) Jazz Richards	(Wales) Swansea City	Undisclosed	
7 July 2015	MF	(England) Jamie O'Hara	(England) Blackpool	Free	
29 July 2015	GK	(England) Andrew Dawber	(England) Accrington Stanley	Free	
4 August 2015	MF	(Finland) Sakari Mattila	(Norway) Aalesund	Undisclosed	
20 August 2015	DF	(United States) Tim Ream	(England) Bolton Wanderers	Undisclosed	
31 August 2015	DF	(England) Ryan Fredericks	(England) Bristol City	Undisclosed	
31 August 2015	DF	(Spain) Ian Pino Soler	(Spain) Almería	Free	
1 September 2015	DF	(England) Richard Stearman	(England) Wolverhampton Wanderers	Undisclosed	
17 November 2015	FW	(England) Isaac Pearce	(England) Bristol Rovers	Free	

=== Loans in ===
Date	Pos.	Name	Parent club	End date	Source
25 July 2015	DF	(England) Luke Garbutt	(England) Everton	End of season	
24 August 2015	GK	(England) Joe Lewis	(Wales) Cardiff City	End of season	
28 August 2015	DF	(England) James Husband	(England) Middlesbrough	12 December 2015	
29 January 2016	DF	(Austria) Michael Madl	(Austria) Sturm Graz	End of season	
1 February 2016	MF	(England) Rohan Ince	(England) Brighton & Hove Albion	End of season	
1 February 2016	FW	(Morocco) Zakaria Labyad	(Portugal) Sporting CP	End of season	
18 February 2016	DF	(Northern Ireland) Chris Baird	(England) Derby County	End of season	

=== Out ===
Date	Pos.	Name	New club	Fee	Source
6 June 2015	DF	(England) Tom Richards	(England) Aldershot Town	Free	
12 June 2015	FW	(Colombia) Hugo Rodallega	(Turkey) Akhisar Belediyespor	Free	
12 June 2015	DF	(Germany) Tim Hoogland	(Germany) VfL Bochum	Free	
12 June 2015	GK	(Hungary) Gábor Király	(Hungary) Szombathelyi Haladás	Free	
12 June 2015	MF	(Netherlands) Chris David	(Netherlands) Go Ahead Eagles	Free	
12 June 2015	MF	(Morocco) Adil Chihi	(Iran) Esteghlal	Free	
12 June 2015	DF	(England) Josh Passley	(England) Dagenham & Redbridge	Free	
12 June 2015	MF	(The Gambia) Solomon Sambou	(England) Bedford Town	Free	
12 June 2015	DF	(Angola) Jonathan Buatu Mananga	(Belgium) Waasland-Beveren	Free	
12 June 2015	DF	(Republic of Ireland) Noe Baba	(England) Birmingham City	Free	
7 July 2015	FW	(Costa Rica) Bryan Ruiz	(Portugal) Sporting CP	Undisclosed	
19 July 2015	FW	(England) Patrick Roberts	(England) Manchester City	Undisclosed	
22 July 2015	MF	(England) Lyle Della-Verde	(England) Fleetwood Town	Free	
26 July 2015	MF	(Australia) Ryan Williams	(England) Barnsley	Undisclosed	
7 August 2015	MF	(Portugal) Mesca	(Cyprus) AEL Limassol	Undisclosed	
21 August 2015	MF	(Germany) Thomas Eisfeld	(Germany) VfL Bochum	Undisclosed	
29 August 2015	DF	(Argentina) Tiago Casasola	(Italy) Como	Free	
26 January 2016	FW	(Australia) Adam Taggart	(Australia) Perth Glory	Undisclosed	
1 February 2016	DF	(Switzerland) Kay Voser	Released		

=== Loans out ===
Date	Pos.	Name	To	End date	Source
19 May 2015	GK	(England) Magnus Norman	(England) Hayes & Yeading	End of season	
22 June 2015	GK	(Netherlands) Maarten Stekelenburg	(England) Southampton	End of season	
1 July 2015	DF	(England) Stephen Arthurworrey	(England) Yeovil Town	End of season	
31 July 2015	DF	(Northern Ireland) Liam Donnelly	(England) Crawley Town	27 October 2015	
6 August 2015	FW	(Greece) Konstantinos Mitroglou	(Portugal) Benfica	End of season	
27 August 2015	GK	(Finland) Jesse Joronen	(England) Stevenage	10 January 2016	
28 August 2015	DF	(Venezuela) Fernando Amorebieta	(England) Middlesbrough	1 February 2016	
31 August 2015	MF	(France) Ange-Freddy Plumain	(France) Red Star	End of season	
1 September 2015	MF	(England) Larnell Cole	(England) Shrewsbury Town	End of season	
1 September 2015	FW	(Australia) Adam Taggart	(Scotland) Dundee United	1 January 2016	
15 September 2015	GK	(England) Andrew Dawber	(England) Aldershot Town	15 October 2015	
26 November 2015	DF	(Wales) Jordan Evans	(England) Oxford United	End of season	
5 January 2016	DF	(Scotland) Jack Grimmer	(England) Shrewsbury Town	End of season	
23 January 2016	DF	(Republic of Ireland) Sean Kavanagh	(England) Mansfield Town	End of season	
26 January 2016	DF	(Australia) Cameron Burgess	(England) Cheltenham Town	End of season	
1 February 2016	DF	(Bulgaria) Nikolay Bodurov	(Denmark) Midtjylland	End of season	
12 February 2016	MF	(England) Ben Pringle	(England) Ipswich Town	12 March 2016	
12 February 2016	MF	(Wales) George Williams	(England) Gillingham	End of season	

== Fixtures and Results ==
=== Friendlies ===
==== Pre-season friendlies ====
On 26 June 2015, Fulham announced their pre-season schedule.

11 July 2015 Training Match	Fulham	3–1	Aston Villa	Albufeira, Portugal
19:30 CEST	Smith 22'; Kačaniklić 67'; McCormack 86'	Report	Kozák 56'	Stadium: Estadio Da Nora

18 July 2015 Friendly	Crawley Town	1–3	Fulham	Crawley
15:00 BST	McLeod 17' (pen.)	Report	Cairney 15'; Richards 43'; Donnelly 90'	Stadium: Broadfield Stadium

22 July 2015 Friendly	Hertha BSC	2–2	Fulham	Schladming, Austria
18:00 CEST	Darida 5'; Hegeler 14' (pen.)	Report	Taggart 31'; Woodrow 71'	Stadium: Athletic Arena Schladming

25 July 2015 Friendly	Eintracht Frankfurt	1–0	Fulham	Irdning, Austria
16:30 BST	Seferovic 37'	Report		Stadium: ATV Arena

1 August 2015 Friendly	Fulham	1–1	Crystal Palace	London
15:00 BST	Pringle 7'	Report	Souaré 51'	Stadium: Craven Cottage

==== In-season friendlies ====
9 October 2015 Friendly	Watford	0–2	Fulham	Watford, London
		Report	Kačaniklić

12 November 2015 Friendly	Fulham	0–1	Watford	Motspur Park, London
		Report	Diamanti

=== Championship ===
==== Matches ====
On 17 June 2015, the fixtures for the forthcoming season were announced.

8 August 2015 1	Cardiff City	1–1	Fulham	Cardiff City Stadium, Cardiff
12:00 BST	Pilkington (yellow card) 52'; Noone 86'	Report	Smith 47'; Dembélé (yellow card) 85'	Attendance: 15,429; Referee: Darren Bond

15 August 2015 2	Fulham	1–2	Brighton and Hove Albion	Craven Cottage, London
15:00 BST	Cairney 43'; Bodurov (yellow card) 54'; Hutchinson (yellow card) 90+4'	Report	Baldock 30'; LuaLua (yellow card) 69'; Hemed (yellow card) 71', (goal) 90+4' (pen.)	Attendance: 19,029; Referee: Neil Swarbrick

18 August 2015 3	Hull City	2–1	Fulham	KC Stadium, Hull
19:45 BST	Elmohamady 34'; Aluko 86'	Report	Pringle (yellow card) 35'; Bodurov (yellow card) 60'; Cairney 69'; O'Hara (yellow card) 90'	Attendance: 16,579; Referee: Graham Salisbury

22 August 2015 4	Fulham	1–1	Huddersfield Town	Craven Cottage, London
15:00 BST	Cairney (yellow card) 78'; Woodrow 90+3'	Report	Wells 63'; Hudson (yellow card) 77'; Davidson (yellow card) 78'	Attendance: 14,283; Referee: James Adcock

29 August 2015 5	Rotherham United	1–3	Fulham	New York Stadium, Rotherham
15:00 BST	Maguire (yellow card) 30'; Derbyshire (penalty missed) 55'; Clarke-Harris 72'	Report	Pringle 7'; McCormack 16' (pen.), (yellow card) 76'; Christensen (yellow card) 86'; Woodrow 90+3'	Attendance: 8,839; Referee: Geoff Eltringham

13 September 2015 6	Fulham	2–1	Blackburn Rovers	Craven Cottage, London
12:00 BST	McCormack 4'; Dembélé 30'; O'Hara (yellow card) 76'	Report	Rhodes 68' (pen.); Hanley (yellow card) 70'; Koita (yellow card) 70'; Duffy (yellow card) 77'	Attendance: 14,372; Referee: Tony Harrington

19 September 2015 7	Sheffield Wednesday	3–2	Fulham	Hillsborough, Sheffield
15:00 BST	Forestieri 13'; López (yellow card) 23'; Lees 37'; Turner 50'	Report	O'Hara 31', (yellow card) 90+1'; Cairney 67'; Burn (yellow card) 79'	Attendance: 18,706; Referee: Simon Hooper

25 September 2015 8	Fulham	4–0	Queen's Park Rangers	Craven Cottage, London
19:45 BST	Dembélé 2'; Pringle 19'; McCormack 31', 63'	Report	Perch (yellow card) 80'	Attendance: 19,784; Referee: Kevin Friend

29 September 2015 9	Fulham	0–3	Wolverhampton Wanderers	Craven Cottage, London
19:45 BST	Cairney (red card) 35'	Report	Le Fondre 56'; Ojo 59'; Henry 78'	Attendance: 14,838; Referee: Darren Drysdale

4 October 2015 10	Charlton Athletic	2–2	Fulham	The Valley, London
12:00 BST	Gudmundsson (yellow card) 64'; Jackson 81'; Cousins 90+6'	Report	Tunnicliffe 32'; Christensen (yellow card) 51'; McCormack 59'	Attendance: 14,662; Referee: James Linington

17 October 2015 11	Middlesbrough	0–0	Fulham	Riverside Stadium, Middlesbrough
15:00 BST	De Pena (yellow card) 27'; Kalas (yellow card) 64'; Leadbitter (yellow card) 79'	Report	Burn (yellow card) 34'; Tunnicliffe (yellow card) 42'; Garbutt (yellow card) 88'	Attendance: 22,498; Referee: Peter Bankes

21 October 2015 12	Fulham	1–1	Leeds United	Craven Cottage, London
19:45 BST	Dembélé 23', (yellow card) 40'; O'Hara (yellow card) 45'; Burn (yellow card) 90+2'; Garbutt (yellow card) 90+3'	Report	Wood 64' (pen.); Cook (yellow card) 90+3'	Attendance: 19,969; Referee: Keith Hill

24 October 2015 13	Fulham	4–2	Reading	Craven Cottage, London
13:30 BST	McCormack 50'; Dembélé 54', 74'; Kačaniklić 56'; Fredericks (yellow card) 76'; Christensen (yellow card) 86'	Report	Piazon 13'; Obita (yellow card) 30'; Gunter (yellow card) 39'; Sa 49'; Blackman (yellow card) 90'	Attendance: 18,618; Referee: Fred Graham

31 October 2015 14	Bristol City	1–4	Fulham	Ashton Gate Stadium, Bristol
15:00 GMT	Freeman (yellow card) 32'; Kodjia (yellow card) 45+1', (goal) 90+3'	Report	Dembélé 2', 18'; McCormack 33'; Tunnicliffe 36'; Stearman (yellow card) 45+3'	Attendance: 15,752; Referee: Andy Woolmer

3 November 2015 15	Burnley	3–1	Fulham	Turf Moor, Burnley
19:45 GMT	Gray 18', 37'; Taylor 90+1'	Report	McCormack 51'	Attendance: 15,080; Referee: Andy Madley

7 November 2015 16	Fulham	2–5	Birmingham City	Craven Cottage, London
15:00 GMT	Lewis (yellow card) 22'; Husband (yellow card) 48' (yellow-red card) 49'; Kačaniklić 66'; McCormack (yellow card) 67', (goal) 90+3'	Report	Gleeson 19'; Caddis 22' (pen.); Toral 31'; Donaldson 82'; Solomon-Otabor 90+5'	Attendance: 18,888; Referee: Iain Williamson

21 November 2015 17	Milton Keynes Dons	1–1	Fulham	stadium:mk, Milton Keynes
15:00 GMT	Bowditch 30'	Report	Dembélé 44'; Kavanagh (yellow card) 56'; McCormack (yellow card) 62'	Attendance: 14,508; Referee: Darren Handley

28 November 2015 18	Fulham	1–1	Preston North End	Craven Cottage, London
15:00 GMT	Husband (yellow card) 58'; Hutchinson (yellow card) 59'; McCormack 77'	Report (Note: There is a discrepancy between sources for Fulham vs Preston North End on 28 November 2015. Sky Sports and the BBC's text commentary do not list Ryan Fredericks as having obtained a yellow card. However, in the BBC's team lineups, Fredericks does have a yellow card. On the Fulham F.C. website, Fredericks is credited with one in both the lineups and the commentary, but Alan Browne's yellow card does not appear in the commentary. This page uses the Sky Sports version for all games.)	Garner 11'; Gallagher (yellow card) 62'; Browne (yellow card) 69'	Attendance: 17,362; Referee: Graham Horwood

5 December 2015 19	Nottingham Forest	3–0	Fulham	City Ground, Nottingham
15:00 GMT	Mills 45', 78'; O'Grady 52'	Report		Attendance: 18,377; Referee: Carl Boyeson

12 December 2015 20	Fulham	2–2	Brentford	Craven Cottage, London
15:00 GMT	Fredericks (yellow card) 27'; Tarowski 40' (o.g.); Stearman (yellow card) 57'; Dembele 64'	Report	Judge 18' (pen.); Canos (yellow card) 36'; O'Connell (yellow card) 57', (goal) 71'	Attendance: 19,411; Referee: David Coote

15 December 2015 21	Fulham	1–2	Ipswich Town	Craven Cottage, London
19:45 GMT	McCormack 14'	Report	Sears 1'; Pitman 57'	Attendance: 15,245; Referee: Trevor Kettle

19 December 2015 22	Bolton Wanderers	2–2	Fulham	Macron Stadium, Bolton
15:00 GMT	Clough 61', 74'	Report	Garbutt 28'; Stearman (yellow card) 53'; McCormack 85'	Attendance: 14,543; Referee: Nigel Miller

26 December 2015 23	Derby County	2–0	Fulham	iPro Stadium, Derbyshire
15:00 GMT	Keogh (yellow card) 37'; Ream (Note: There is a discrepancy between sources for Derby County vs Fulham on 26 December 2015. Sky Sports in both the summary and the main article lists Tim Ream as having scored this own goal. However, in both the BBC and Fulham F.C. versions, Emerson Hyndman is credited in the summaries but Ream in the articles proper.) 52' (o.g.); Butterfield 84'	Report	Stearman (yellow card) 22'	Attendance: 32,134; Referee: Scott Duncan

29 December 2015 24	Fulham	4–1	Rotherham United	Craven Cottage, London
19:45 GMT	Woodrow 6', 45'; Kačaniklić 59'; McCormack 69'	Report	Rawson 20'	Attendance: 16,333; Referee: Simon Hooper

2 January 2016 25	Fulham	0–1	Sheffield Wednesday	Craven Cottage, London
15:00 GMT	Burn (yellow card) 60'; McCormack (yellow card) 78'	Report	Wallace 29'; Bannan (yellow card) 45+2'	Attendance: 19,263; Referee: Kevin Johnson

12 January 2016 26	Wolverhampton Wanderers	3–2	Fulham	Molineux, Wolverhampton
19:45 GMT	Zyro 6', 13'; Doherty 48'	Report	Christensen 24', (yellow card) 35'; Burn (yellow card) 64'; McCormack 74'; Hyndman (yellow card) 90+4'	Attendance: 17,387; Referee: Andrew Madley

16 January 2016 27	Huddersfield Town	1–1	Fulham	John Smith's Stadium, Huddersfield
15:00 GMT	Hudson 19', (yellow card) 32'; Bunn (yellow card) 68'	Report	McCormack 2'; Garbutt (yellow card) 68'	Attendance: 12,039; Referee: Chris Sarginson

23 January 2016 28	Fulham	0–1	Hull City	Craven Cottage, London
15:00 GMT	Burn (yellow card) 42'	Report	Livermore (yellow card) 35'; Hayden (yellow card) 54'; Odubajo (yellow card) 72'; Hernández 80' (pen.)	Attendance: 16,935; Referee: Paul Tierney

6 February 2016 29	Fulham	1–1	Derby County	Craven Cottage, London
15:00 GMT	Garbutt (yellow card) 7'; Olsson 17' (o.g.); O'Hara (yellow card) 81'	Report	Bryson 44'; Olsson (yellow card) 90+3'	Attendance: 18,472; Referee: Darren Deadman

13 February 2016 30	Queens Park Rangers	1–3	Fulham	Loftus Road, London
12:30 GMT	Onuoha (yellow card) 48'; Hall (yellow card) 82'; Chery 90+1'	Report	McCormack 35'; Dembélé 40'; Cairney 45+2'; Burn (yellow card) 67'; O'Hara (yellow card) 68'	Attendance: 17,335; Referee: Tim Robinson

16 February 2016 31	Blackburn Rovers	3–0	Fulham	Ewood Park, Blackburn
19:45 GMT	Marshall 15' (pen.); Duffy 62'; Graham (yellow card) 65', (goal) 87'	Report	Mattila (yellow card) 52'; Fredericks (yellow card) 58'; McCormack (yellow card) 71'	Attendance: 12,157; Referee: Phil Gibbs

20 February 2016 32	Fulham	3–0	Charlton Athletic	Craven Cottage, London
15:00 GMT	Amorebieta (yellow card) 20'; Cairney 32', 78'; Burn (yellow card) 43'; Madl 59'; Tunnicliffe (yellow card) 86'	Report	Fox (yellow card) 85'	Attendance: 16,565; Referee: Kevin Friend

22 February 2016 33	Leeds United	1–1	Fulham	Elland Road, Leeds
19:45 GMT	Cook 38', (yellow card) 90+3'; Bamba (yellow card) 68'	Report	Cairney 17'; Amorebieta (yellow card) 68' (yellow-red card) 90+4'; Fredericks (yellow card) 84'	Attendance: 17,103; Referee: Kevin Wright

27 February 2016 34	Fulham	0–2	Middlesbrough	Craven Cottage, London
15:00 GMT	Burn (yellow card) 71'; Stearman (red card) 86'; O'Hara (yellow card) 90+5'	Report	Adomah 3'; Leadbitter 20' (pen.)	Attendance: 18,862; Referee: Charles Breakspear

5 March 2016 35	Reading	2–2	Fulham	Madejski Stadium, Reading
15:00 GMT	Robson-Kanu 24' (pen.), 41'	Report	Dembélé 8'; Fredericks (yellow card) 21'; McCormack 52' (pen.), (yellow card) 64'; Tunnicliffe (yellow card) 72'; Richards (yellow card) 90'	Attendance: 17,859; Referee: Simon Hooper

8 March 2016 36	Fulham	2–3	Burnley	Craven Cottage, London
19:45 GMT	McCormack 17'; Dembélé 22'; Madl (yellow card) 85'	Report	Vokes 9', 49' (pen.); Gray 61'; Boyd (yellow card) 70'; Arfield (yellow card) 89'	Attendance: 15,281; Referee: Dean Whitestone

12 March 2016 37	Fulham	1–2	Bristol City	Craven Cottage, London
15:00 GMT	McCormack 3'; Fredericks (yellow card) 79'; Madl (yellow card) 89'	Report	Pack (yellow card) 63', (goal) 69'; Tomlin 90'	Attendance: 20,316; Referee: Phil Gibbs

19 March 2016 38	Birmingham City	1–1	Fulham	St Andrew's, Birmingham
15:00 GMT	Morrison 56'	Report	Ince 38'; Dembélé (yellow card) 49'; Parker (yellow card) 62'; Madl (yellow card) 64'; Fredericks (yellow card) 89'; Bettinelli (yellow card) 90+6'	Attendance: 17,104; Referee: Darren Handley

2 April 2016 39	Fulham	2–1	Milton Keynes Dons	Craven Cottage, London
15:00 BST	Amorebieta (yellow card) 19'; Stearman (yellow card) 33'; McCormack 54'; Dembélé 75', (yellow card) 90+6'; Tunnicliffe (yellow card) 90+3'	Report	Walsh (yellow card) 56'; Murphy 63'	Attendance: 17,588; Referee: Tim Robinson

5 April 2016 40	Preston North End	1–2	Fulham	Deepdale, Preston
19:45 BST	Hugill (yellow card) 44'; Vermijl 63'; Beckford (yellow card) 90+1'; Huntington (yellow card) 90+5'	Report	McCormack 5'; Cairney (yellow card) 53'; Ince (yellow card) 60'; Dembélé 74'; Tunnicliffe (yellow card) 86'	Attendance: 10,358; Referee: Scott Duncan

9 April 2016 41	Fulham	2–1	Cardiff City	Craven Cottage, London
15:00 BST	Parker 46'; Fredericks (yellow card) 88'; Hyndman 90+3'	Report	Immers 41'	Attendance: 17,149; Referee: Jeremy Simpson

15 April 2016 42	Brighton and Hove Albion	5–0	Fulham	Falmer Stadium, Brighton
19:45 BST	Hemed 29' (pen.), 34', 79', (yellow card) 37'; Bruno 54'; Knockaert 87'	Report	O'Hara (yellow card) 38'; Fredericks (yellow card) 47'; Christensen (yellow card) 74'	Attendance: 28,505; Referee: Andy Woolmer

19 April 2016 43	Ipswich Town	1–1	Fulham	Portman Road, Ipswich
19:45 BST	Knudsen 90+1'; Smith (yellow card) 90+4'	Report	Dembélé 66'; Parker (yellow card) 86'	Attendance: 16,953; Referee: Paul Tierney

23 April 2016 44	Fulham	1–3	Nottingham Forest	Craven Cottage, London
15:00 BST	Fredericks (yellow card) 21'; Smith 62', (yellow card) 81'	Report	Mills (yellow card) 18'; Tesche 23'; Lansbury 43' (pen.), 70'	Attendance: 18,253; Referee: Robert Lewis

30 April 2016 45	Brentford	3–0	Fulham	Griffin Park, London
15:00 BST	Saunders 5'; Hogan 7', 40'; Canos (yellow card) 51'	Report		Attendance: 12,301; Referee: Mark Haywood

7 May 2016 46	Fulham	1–0	Bolton Wanderers	Craven Cottage, London
12:30 BST	Cairney 77'	Report		Attendance: 17,207; Referee: Oliver Langford

==== Results summary ====
Overall								Home						Away					
Pld	W	D	L	GF	GA	GD	Pts	W	D	L	GF	GA	GD	W	D	L	GF	GA	GD
46	12	15	19	66	79	−13	51	8	5	10	36	36	0	4	10	9	30	43	−13

Last updated: 7 May 2016.
Source: Sky Sports

==== Results by matchday ====
Matchday	1	2	3	4	5	6	7	8	9	10	11	12	13	14	15	16	17	18	19	20	21	22	23	24	25	26	27	28	29	30	31	32	33	34	35	36	37	38	39	40	41	42	43	44	45	46
Ground	A	H	A	H	A	H	A	H	H	A	A	H	H	A	A	H	A	H	A	H	H	A	A	H	H	A	A	H	H	A	A	H	A	H	A	H	H	A	H	A	H	A	A	H	A	H
Result	D	L	L	D	W	W	L	W	L	D	D	D	W	W	L	L	D	D	L	D	L	D	L	W	L	L	D	L	D	W	L	W	D	L	D	L	L	D	W	W	W	L	D	L	L	W
Position	10	17	21	21	14	11	16	11	14	13	13	13	11	10	11	12	12	13	16	17	17	18	19	18	19	19	19	19	19	17	19	18	18	20	19	19	20	21	21	19	17	17	19	21	21	20

Updated to match(es) played on 7 May 2016. Source: Statto.com
A = Away; H = Home; W = Win; D = Draw; L = Loss

=== Football League Cup ===
On 16 June 2015, the first round draw was made, Fulham were drawn away against Wycombe Wanderers. Fulham were drawn at home against Sheffield United in the second round.

11 August 2015 First round	Wycombe Wanderers	0–1	Fulham	Adams Park, High Wycombe
19:45 BST	Rowe (yellow card) 78'; Harriman (yellow card) 86'	Report	Kačaniklić (yellow card) 55', (goal) 69'; O'Hara (yellow card) 72'	Attendance: 4,012; Referee: Gavin Ward

25 August 2015 Second round	Fulham	3–0	Sheffield United	Craven Cottage, Fulham
19:45 BST	McCormack 62' (pen.), 75'; Dembélé 90'	Report	J. Wallace (yellow card) 47'; Alcock (yellow card) 69'; Baxter (red card) 88'; K. Wallace (red card) 90'	Attendance: 5,927; Referee: Dean Whitestone

22 September 2015 Third round	Fulham	0–1	Stoke City	Craven Cottage, Fulham
19:45 BST	Tunnicliffe (yellow card) 90'	Report	Crouch 33', (yellow card) 72'; Pieters (yellow card) 90'	Attendance: 9,100; Referee: Stuart Attwell

=== FA Cup ===
9 January 2016 Third round	Sheffield Wednesday	2–1	Fulham	Hillsborough, Sheffield
15:00 GMT	Bannan 42'; Nuhiu 73'	Report	Richards (yellow card) 9'; Woodrow (yellow card) 18'; Dembélé 43'	Attendance: 15,244; Referee: Gavin Ward

== Competitions ==
=== Overall ===
Competition	Started round	Current position / round	Final position / round	First match	Last match
Championship	—	—	20th	8 August 2015	7 May 2016
League Cup	First round	—	Third round	11 August 2015	22 September 2015
FA Cup	Third round	—	Third round	9 January 2016	9 January 2016

Updated to match played 7 May 2016
Source: Competitions

=== Championship table ===
Pos	Team	Pld	W	D	L	GF	GA	GD	Pts	Promotion, qualification or relegation
18	Bristol City	46	13	13	20	54	71	−17	52	
19	Huddersfield Town	46	13	12	21	59	70	−11	51	
20	Fulham	46	12	15	19	66	79	−13	51	
21	Rotherham United	46	13	10	23	53	71	−18	49	
22	Charlton Athletic (R)	46	9	13	24	40	80	−40	40	Relegation to EFL League One

Source: BBC Sport
Rules for classification: 1) Points; 2) Goal difference; 3) Number of goals scored
(R) Relegated

== Squad statistics ==
=== Appearances & goals ===
Last updated 7 May 2016.

- Players listed with no appearances have been in the matchday squad but only as unused substitutes.

No.	Pos	Nat	Player	Total		Championship		League Cup		FA Cup	
No.	Pos	Nat	Player	Apps	Goals	Apps	Goals	Apps	Goals	Apps	Goals
1	GK	(England) ENG	Marcus Bettinelli	12	0	11+0	0	1+0	0	0+0	0
2	DF	(Wales) WAL	Jazz Richards	26	0	21+1	0	2+1	0	1+0	0
3	DF	(England) ENG	Luke Garbutt (on loan from Everton)	25	1	19+5	1	0+0	0	1+0	0
4	DF	(England) ENG	Shaun Hutchinson	10	0	7+1	0	1+0	0	1+0	0
5	DF	(England) ENG	Richard Stearman	30	0	27+2	0	1+0	0	0+0	0
7	DF	(England) ENG	Ryan Fredericks	32	0	23+9	0	0+0	0	0+0	0
8	MF	(England) ENG	Scott Parker	24	1	20+4	1	0+0	0	0+0	0
9	FW	(England) ENG	Matt Smith	21	2	5+15	2	0+1	0	0+0	0
10	MF	(Scotland) SCO	Tom Cairney	42	8	37+2	8	1+1	0	1+0	0
11	MF	(Sweden) SWE	Alexander Kačaniklić	27	4	10+13	3	3+0	1	1+0	0
12	GK	(England) ENG	Joe Lewis (on loan from Cardiff City)	9	0	7+1	0	1+0	0	0+0	0
13	DF	(United States) USA	Tim Ream	32	0	27+2	0	2+0	0	0+1	0
14	MF	(Finland) FIN	Sakari Mattila	9	0	2+4	0	1+1	0	0+1	0
15	DF	(Austria) AUT	Michael Madl (on loan from Sturm Graz)	14	1	13+1	1	0+0	0	0+0	0
16	FW	(England) ENG	Cauley Woodrow	17	4	1+13	4	2+0	0	1+0	0
19	MF	(England) ENG	Ryan Tunnicliffe	29	2	23+4	2	1+1	0	0+0	0
20	MF	(Morocco) MAR	Zakaria Labyad (on loan from Sporting Clube de Portugal)	2	0	0+2	0	0+0	0	0+0	0
21	MF	(Denmark) DEN	Lasse Vigen Christensen	31	1	18+10	1	2+0	0	1+0	0
22	MF	(Northern Ireland) NIR	Chris Baird (on loan from Derby County)	7	0	3+4	0	0+0	0	0+0	0
23	MF	(England) ENG	Jamie O'Hara	39	1	32+5	1	1+0	0	1+0	0
24	GK	(England) ENG	Andy Lonergan	31	0	28+1	0	1+0	0	1+0	0
25	FW	(France) FRA	Moussa Dembélé	46	17	37+6	15	1+1	1	0+1	1
28	MF	(United States) USA	Emerson Hyndman	16	1	8+7	1	0+1	0	0+0	0
31	MF	(England) ENG	Rohan Ince (on loan from Brighton & Hove Albion)	10	1	8+2	1	0+0	0	0+0	0
33	DF	(England) ENG	Dan Burn	35	0	28+4	0	2+0	0	1+0	0
42	GK	(Slovakia) SVK	Marek Rodak	0	0	0+0	0	0+0	0	0+0	0
44	FW	(Scotland) SCO	Ross McCormack	49	23	45+0	21	3+0	2	1+0	0
45	DF	(Venezuela) VEN	Fernando Amorebieta	14	0	14+0	0	0+0	0	0+0	0
99	DF	(Serbia) SRB	Andrija Lazović	19	0	19+0	0	0+0	0	0+0	0
Out on loan
6	DF	(Bulgaria) BUL	Nikolay Bodurov	5	0	2+1	0	1+1	0	0+0	0
17	MF	(Wales) WAL	George Williams	1	0	0+1	0	0+0	0	0+0	0
18	MF	(England) ENG	Ben Pringle	18	2	12+3	2	3+0	0	0+0	0
26	DF	(Scotland) SCO	Jack Grimmer	1	0	0+0	0	1+0	0	0+0	0
32	MF	(Republic of Ireland) IRL	Sean Kavanagh	2	0	2+0	0	0+0	0	0+0	0
34	MF	(England) ENG	Larnell Cole	0	0	0+0	0	0+0	0	0+0	0
39	DF	(Wales) WAL	Jordan Evans	0	0	0+0	0	0+0	0	0+0	0
Left during season
15	DF	(Switzerland) SUI	Kay Voser	9	0	4+3	0	2+0	0	0+0	0
40	DF	(England) ENG	James Husband (on loan from Middlesbrough)	12	0	12+0	0	0+0	0	0+0	0

=== Top scorers ===
Includes all competitive matches. The list is sorted by squad number when total goals are equal.

Last updated 7 May 2016.

Rank	No.	Nationality	Player	Championship	League Cup	FA Cup	Total
1	44	(Scotland)	Ross McCormack	21	2	0	23
2	25	(France)	Moussa Dembélé	15	1	1	17
3	10	(Scotland)	Tom Cairney	8	0	0	8
4
4	11	(Sweden)	Alexander Kačaniklić	3	1	0	4
4	16	(England)	Cauley Woodrow	4	0	0	4
6
6	9	(England)	Matt Smith	2	0	0	2
6	18	(England)	Ben Pringle	2	0	0	2
6	19	(England)	Ryan Tunnicliffe	2	0	0	2
9
9	3	(England)	Luke Garbutt	1	0	0	1
9	8	(England)	Scott Parker	1	0	0	1
9	15	(Austria)	Michael Madl	1	0	0	1
9	21	(Denmark)	Lasse Vigen Christensen	1	0	0	1
9	23	(England)	Jamie O'Hara	1	0	0	1
9	28	(United States)	Emerson Hyndman	1	0	0	1
9	31	(England)	Rohan Ince	1	0	0	1
Own goals				2	0	0	2
TOTALS				66	4	1	71

=== Disciplinary record ===
Includes all competitive matches. The list is sorted by shirt number.

N	P	Nat.	Name	Championship			League Cup			FA Cup			Total			Notes
N	P	Nat.	Name	Yellow card	Second yellow card	Red card	Yellow card	Second yellow card	Red card	Yellow card	Second yellow card	Red card	Yellow card	Second yellow card	Red card	Notes
1	GK	(England)	Marcus Bettinelli	1									1			
2	DF	(Wales)	Jazz Richards	1						1			2			
3	DF	(England)	Luke Garbutt	4									4			
4	MF	(England)	Shaun Hutchinson	2									2			
5	DF	(England)	Richard Stearman	5		1							5		1	
7	DF	(England)	Ryan Fredericks (Note: There is a discrepancy between sources for Fulham vs Preston North End on 28 November 2015. Sky Sports and the BBC's text commentary do not list Ryan Fredericks as having obtained a yellow card. However, in the BBC's team lineups, Fredericks does have a yellow card. On the Fulham F.C. website, Fredericks is credited with one in both the lineups and the commentary, but Alan Browne's yellow card does not appear in the commentary. This page uses the Sky Sports version for all games.)	9									9			
8	MF	(England)	Scott Parker	2									2			
9	FW	(England)	Matt Smith	1									1			
10	MF	(Scotland)	Tom Cairney	2		1							2		1	
11	MF	(Sweden)	Alexander Kačaniklić				1						1			
12	GK	(England)	Joe Lewis	1									1			
14	MF	(Finland)	Sakari Mattila	1									1			
15	DF	(Austria)	Michael Madl	3									3			
16	FW	(England)	Cauley Woodrow							1			1			
19	MF	(England)	Ryan Tunnicliffe	6			1						7			
21	MF	(Denmark)	Lasse Vigen Christensen	5									5			
23	MF	(England)	Jamie O'Hara	8			1						9			
25	FW	(France)	Moussa Dembélé	4									4			
28	MF	(United States)	Emerson Hyndman	1			1						2			
31	MF	(England)	Rohan Ince	1									1			
33	DF	(England)	Dan Burn	9									9			
44	FW	(Scotland)	Ross McCormack	6									6			
45	DF	(Venezuela)	Fernando Amorebieta	2	1								2	1		
Out on loan
6	MF	(Bulgaria)	Nikolay Bodurov	2									2			
18	MF	(England)	Ben Pringle	1									1			
32	DF	(Republic of Ireland)	Sean Kavanagh	1									1			
Now left club
40	DF	(England)	James Husband	1	1								1	1		
TOTALS				79	2	2	3	0	0	2	0	0	84	2	2	

Last updated: 7 May 2016
Source: Football League
Ordered by (red card) , (second yellow card) and (yellow card)
(yellow card) = Number of bookings; (second yellow card) = Number of sending offs after a second yellow card; (red card) = Number of sending offs by a direct red card.

==== Suspensions ====
Player	Date Received	Offence	Length of suspension	
Ryan Tunnicliffe	16 June 2015	Homophobic abuse of Patrick Bamford	2 Matches	Cardiff City (A) (Championship), Wycombe Wanderers (A) (Football League Cup)
Tom Cairney	29 September 2015	(red card) vs Wolverhampton Wanderers	3 Matches	Charlton Athletic (A), Middlesbrough (A), Leeds United (H) (Championship)
Jamie O'Hara	21 October 2015	Five (yellow card) in all competitions	1 Match	Reading (H) (Championship)
James Husband	7 November 2015	(yellow card) (yellow-red card) vs Birmingham City	1 Match	Milton Keynes Dons (A) (Championship)
Fernando Amorebieta	23 February 2016	(yellow card) (yellow-red card) vs Leeds United	1 Match	Middlesbrough (H) (Championship)
Richard Stearman	27 February 2016	(red card) vs Middlesbrough	1 Match	Reading (A) (Championship)

Last updated: 7 May 2016.
Source: Football Association
