= Moussa Dembélé (French footballer) =

French footballer (born 1996)

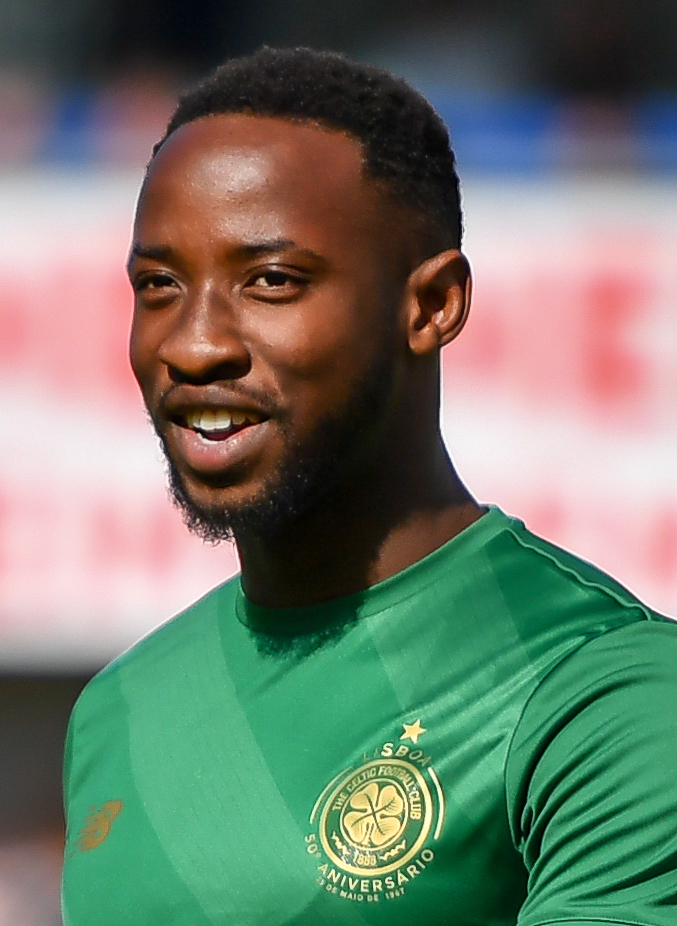
- Dembélé playing for Celtic in 2017

Personal information
- Full name: Moussa Dembélé
- Date of birth: 12 July 1996 (age 30)
- Place of birth: Pontoise, France
- Height: 1.83 m (6 ft 0 in)
- Position: Striker

Team information
- Current team: Al-Ettifaq
- Number: 9

Youth career
- 2002–2004: US Cergy Clos
- 2004–2012: Paris Saint-Germain
- 2012–2013: Fulham

Senior career*
Years	Team	Apps	(Gls)
2013–2016	Fulham	56	(15)
2016–2018	Celtic	55	(26)
2018–2023	Lyon	129	(56)
2021	→ Atlético Madrid (loan)	5	(0)
2023–	Al-Ettifaq	75	(31)

International career
2011–2012	France U16	14	(4)
2013	France U17	3	(0)
2013–2014	France U18	3	(1)
2014–2015	France U19	10	(5)
2015–2016	France U20	4	(0)
2016–2019	France U21	25	(13)
- * Club domestic league appearances and goals as of 20 October 2026 (UTC)

Moussa Dembélé (born 12 July 1996) is a French professional footballer who plays as a striker for Saudi Pro League club Al-Ettifaq.

Developed at Paris Saint-Germain, Dembélé made his professional debut for Fulham in the Premier League in November 2013. He scored 19 goals in 64 matches for Fulham before joining Celtic in 2016. Dembélé helped Celtic win consecutive Scottish domestic trebles, before moving to Lyon in August 2018.

Dembélé earned over 50 caps for France at the youth level, and in October 2016, was called up to the under-21 team.

== Early life ==
Dembélé was born in Pontoise, Île-de-France. He is of Malian descent.

== Club career ==
=== Fulham ===
In 2012, Dembélé signed for Fulham at the age of 16 from Paris Saint-Germain. He subsequently became a regular in the Fulham under-18 team and won the Premier Academy League in his first season with the club. He signed his first contract with Fulham in July 2013, lasting until the summer of 2015.

Dembélé was an unused substitute for Fulham's Premier League match against Swansea City on 23 November 2013. He made his competitive debut one week later against West Ham United, coming on as a substitute in the 83rd minute for Kieran Richardson in a 3–0 loss at the Boleyn Ground, but finished the match with an injury. On 30 March 2014, he started for the first time in the Premier League as Fulham lost 3–1 at home to Everton. The club ended the season with relegation to the Championship. He was still eligible for the academy teams, and scored in both legs of the 2014 FA Youth Cup Final.

On 28 October 2014, in the fourth round of the League Cup, Dembélé scored his first professional goals, a brace which put Fulham 2–0 up at home against Derby County. However, the match ended in a 5–2 defeat.

Dembélé scored his first league goal for Fulham in a 2–1 win against Blackburn Rovers on 13 September 2015, and scored a brace against Reading on 24 October as Fulham overcame a 2–0 deficit to win 4–2. Dembélé scored twice again in the following match a week later as Fulham beat Bristol City 4–1 at Ashton Gate. By the end of the calendar year, he had totalled ten goals for the season.

=== Celtic ===
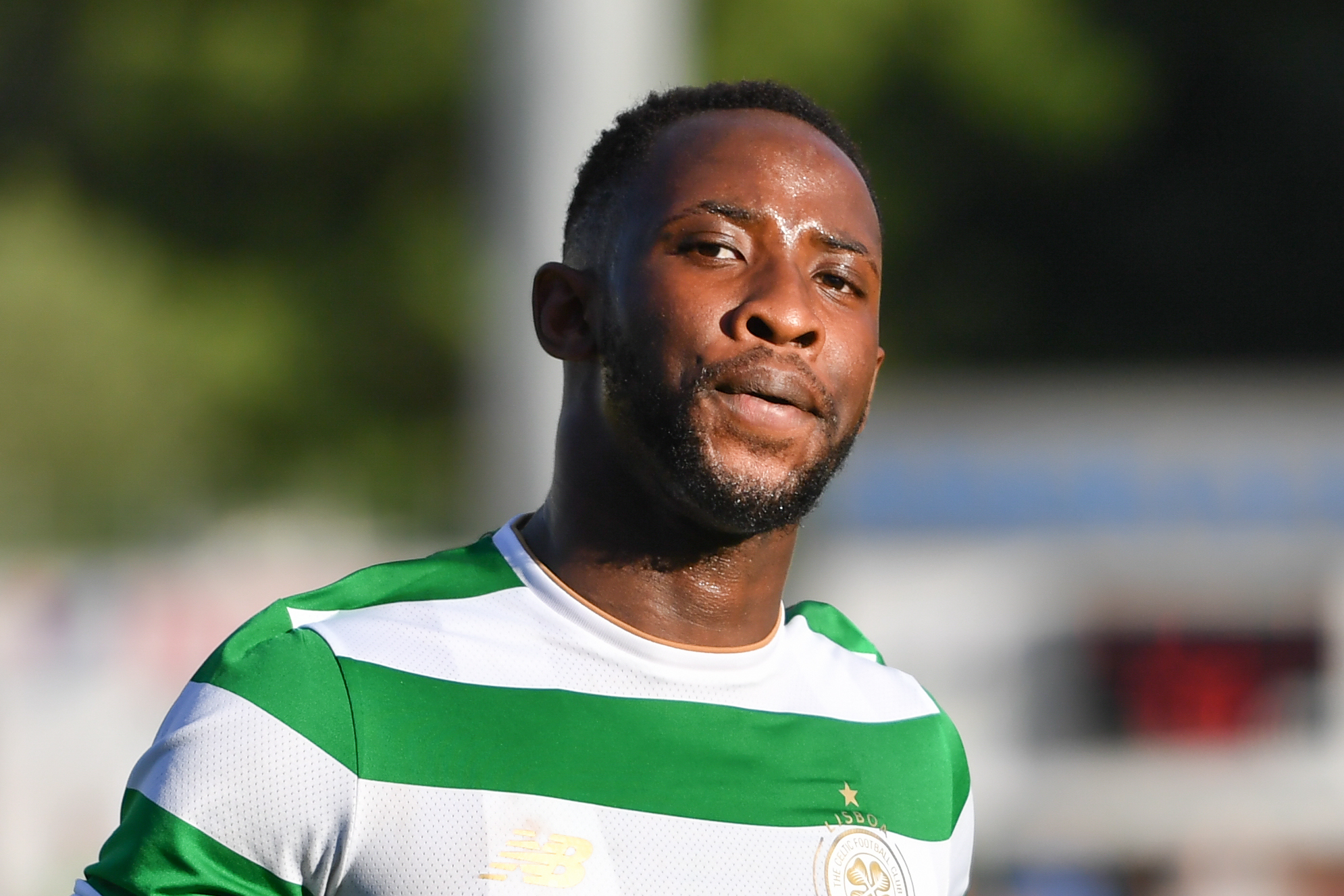
Dembélé playing for Celtic in 2017

On 28 June 2016, Scottish Premiership club Celtic signed Dembélé on a four-year contract. He made his debut on 12 July, his 20th birthday, partnering Leigh Griffiths up front in a 1–0 loss at Gibraltar's Lincoln Red Imps in the first leg of the second qualifying round of the 2016–17 UEFA Champions League.

On 3 August, Dembélé scored his first goal for the club with a 92nd-minute penalty against Astana (after having won the penalty himself) to put Celtic into the Champions League play-offs. He followed this up by scoring twice against Motherwell in the Scottish League Cup last 16 on 10 August, as Celtic ran out 5–0 winners. He also scored the fourth goal in a 5–2 win over Hapoel Be'er Sheva the following week.

On 10 September, as his club defeated Rangers 5–1 at Parkhead, he scored Celtic's first Old Firm derby league hat-trick since Stevie Chalmers in 1966, and was the first Celtic player to score a hat-trick in any game against Rangers since Harry Hood in 1973. It was also considered to be a "perfect hat-trick", given his goals were scored with his head, his right foot and his left foot. On 24 September, Dembélé scored twice in a 6–1 win over Kilmarnock, then four days later, he scored his first two Champions League group stage goals against Manchester City, as Celtic finished the match with a 3–3 draw. His goalscoring form at that time saw him named the Premiership Player of the Month for September.

Dembélé scored a late winner in a 1–0 victory over Rangers on 23 October, sending Celtic to the League Cup final, and scored again in the final against Aberdeen, scoring from the penalty spot as Celtic won 3–0 for his first senior honour.

Dembélé was linked with a move to Chelsea during the January 2017 transfer window. Coincidentally, he was sent to a hospital in Chelsea for medical treatment on 31 January, the final day of the transfer window. However, Chelsea manager Antonio Conte dismissed the rumours, stating that he had never spoke to his board about Dembélé. Later that day, Dembélé confirmed he was staying by tweeting a picture of himself celebrating a goal above an image of Leonardo DiCaprio's character Jordan Belfort from the film The Wolf of Wall Street.

Dembélé scored back-to-back hat-tricks in February 2017, in 5–2 and 6–0 victories over St Johnstone in the Scottish Premiership and Inverness Caledonian Thistle in the Scottish Cup, respectively with his final goal in the 5–2 victory over St Johnstone awarding him Scotland's 'Goal of the Season' for 2016–17 as well as the goal being nominated for the prestigious FIFA Puskas Award. The goal had 25 passes, a Rabona and a back heel, with every player getting a touch on the ball and a clinical finish at the end which completed Dembélé's hat-trick.

Throughout the 2017–18 Scottish Premiership season, Dembélé suffered three injuries keeping him out of action for a total of 82 days. Due to the injuries, Dembélé struggled to find the form of his 2016–17 Scottish Premiership season, but still managed 16 goals in 39 appearances, contributing greatly to Celtic, thus completing their second consecutive domestic treble.

=== Lyon ===
On 31 August 2018, Dembélé signed for Ligue 1 club Olympique Lyonnais on a five-year contract. The transfer fee was reported as €22 million (£19.7 million), payable to Celtic over 5 years. He made his competitive debut for the club on 15 September in the 2–2 Ligue 1 draw at Caen, playing the full 90 minutes. On 26 September, Dembélé scored his first competitive goals for the club when he scored two first-half goals in the 3–0 Ligue 1 away win over Dijon. On 3 February 2019, he headed in the equaliser and later won the penalty which Nabil Fekir converted in the 2–1 Ligue 1 home win over Paris Saint-Germain and handed the leaders their first 2018–19 Ligue 1 defeat.

On 15 August 2020, Dembélé came on as a substitute on the 75th minute, scoring two goals against Manchester City in the 2019–20 UEFA Champions League quarter-finals which Lyon won 3–1 and progressed to the semi-finals.

==== Loan to Atlético Madrid ====
On 13 January 2021, Dembélé moved from Lyon to Atlético Madrid, on a 'loan with option to buy' deal until the end of the season. According to Marca, the transfer fee for the loan reportedly amounted to €1.5M and Atlético reserved a purchase option for €33.5M, plus a variable additional amount depending on the player fulfilling certain goals.

=== Al-Ettifaq ===
On 26 July 2023, Dembélé joined Saudi Professional League club Al-Ettifaq on a four-year deal. He made his debut and scored his first goal for the club on 14 August in a 2–1 win against Al-Nassr in the league.

== International career ==
Dembélé was part of the France under-19 squad which reached the semi-finals of the 2015 European Championship, scoring in group stage victories over Ukraine and hosts Greece. He made his debut for the under-21 team in October 2016, coming on as a second-half substitute and scoring one of France's goals in a 5–1 win over Georgia. On 13 November 2017, Dembélé scored an 11-minute hat-trick for the France U-21 team in a 3–1 away win over Slovenia, which was the forward's 7th goal in 10 games for the international outfit at the time. The hat-trick was also the quickest treble by a player in any French age group for 15 years.

== Personal life ==
On 21 April 2025, Dembélé became the owner of Lithuanian club FK Minija through his investment group, Triple M.

== Career statistics ==
As of match played 20 October 2026

Appearances and goals by club, season and competition
Club	Season	League			National cup (Note: Includes FA Cup, Scottish Cup, Coupe de France, King's Cup)		League cup (Note: Includes Football League Cup, Scottish League Cup, Coupe de la Ligue)		Continental		Other		Total	
Club	Season	Division	Apps	Goals	Apps	Goals	Apps	Goals	Apps	Goals	Apps	Goals	Apps	Goals
Fulham	2013–14	Premier League	2	0	1	0	0	0	—		—		3	0
Fulham	2014–15	Championship	11	0	3	0	1	2	—		—		15	2
Fulham	2015–16	Championship	43	15	1	1	2	1	—		—		46	17
Fulham	Total		56	15	5	1	3	3	—		—		64	19
Celtic	2016–17	Scottish Premiership	29	17	4	5	4	5	12 (Note: Appearances in UEFA Champions League)	5	—		49	32
Celtic	2017–18	Scottish Premiership	25	9	4	3	2	3	8 (Note: Six appearances and one goal in UEFA Champions League, two appearances in UEFA Europa League)	1	—		39	16
Celtic	2018–19	Scottish Premiership	1	0	—		1	1	4 (Note: Three appearances and two goals in UEFA Champions League, one appearance in UEFA Europa League)	2	—		6	3
Celtic	Total		55	26	8	8	7	9	24	8	—		94	51
Lyon	2018–19	Ligue 1	33	15	5	3	2	1	6	1	—		46	20
Lyon	2019–20	Ligue 1	27	16	5	4	4	2	10	2	—		46	24
Lyon	2020–21	Ligue 1	16	1	0	0	—		—		—		16	1
Lyon	2021–22	Ligue 1	30	21	0	0	—		6 (Note: Appearances in UEFA Europa League)	1	—		36	22
Lyon	2022–23	Ligue 1	23	3	5	0	—		—		—		28	3
Lyon	Total		129	56	15	7	6	3	22	4	—		172	70
Atlético Madrid (loan)	2020–21	La Liga	5	0	0	0	—		2	0	—		7	0
Al-Ettifaq	2023–24	Saudi Pro League	25	12	1	2	—		—		—		26	14
Al-Ettifaq	2024–25	Saudi Pro League	19	7	2	0	—		—		3 (Note: Appearances in GFF Gulf Club Champions League)	2	24	9
Al-Ettifaq	2025–26	Saudi Pro League	22	9	0	0	—		—		—		22	9
Al-Ettifaq	2026–27	Saudi Pro League	9	3	1	0	—		—		1	0	11	3
Al-Ettifaq	Total		75	31	4	2	—		—		4	2	83	35
Career total			320	128	32	18	16	15	48	12	4	2	420	175

== Honours ==
Celtic

- Scottish Premiership: 2016–17, 2017–18
- Scottish Cup: 2016–17, 2017–18
- Scottish League Cup: 2016–17, 2017–18

Lyon

- Coupe de la Ligue runner-up: 2019–20

Atletico Madrid

- La Liga: 2020–21

Individual

- London Football League Player of the Year: 2015–16
- Trophée Téléfoot du meilleur espoir français de l'année (France Under-21 Player of the Year): 2016
- Scottish Premiership Player of the Month: September 2016, February 2017
- PFA Scotland Team of the Year (Premiership): 2016–17
- PFA Scotland Goal of the Season: 2016–17
- Celtic Top Goalscorer: 2016–17
- Celtic Goal of the Season: 2016–17
