= 2014–15 Fulham F.C. season =

Fulham
2014–15 season
- Chairman: Shahid Khan
- Manager: Felix Magath (until 18 September 2014); Kit Symons (initially caretaker, permanent from 29 October 2014)
- Stadium: Craven Cottage
- Football League Championship: 17th
- FA Cup: Fourth round (eliminated by Sunderland)
- League Cup: Fourth round (eliminated by Derby County)
- Top goalscorer: League: Ross McCormack (17); All: Ross McCormack (19)
- Highest home attendance: 23,271 (vs Brentford, Championship, 3 April 2015)
- Lowest home attendance: 8,070 (vs Doncaster Rovers, League Cup, 23 September 2014)
- Average home league attendance: 18,268
Home colours	Away colours

The 2014–15 season was Fulham's 117th professional season and first in the Championship under its current name and the first in the division since 2001. Fulham took one point from their first eight games, effectively writing off any chance of promotion. Fulham temporarily rescued their season by means of sacking Felix Magath and appointing Kit Symons. The resulting run of form led to play-off aspirations, before a poor run of form at the beginning of 2015 led to worries about a second consecutive relegation. However, Fulham only lost one of their last six games, which kept them safe at the expense of Millwall, Wigan Athletic, and Blackpool.

Much hype occurred surrounding the £11,000,000 signing of 2013–14 Championship top scorer Ross McCormack, who scored 17 goals in the league, 19 in total. Fulham also competed in the League Cup, reaching the fourth round, and the FA Cup, also reaching the fourth round.

== Season review ==
=== August ===
For Fulham's first game, against Ipswich Town, Felix Magath fielded eight debutants, including five in the back line, in the starting eleven. Only Scott Parker, Moussa Dembélé, and Chris David, the lack of experience showed Fulham conceded a corner after just 17 seconds as Ipswich created the early chances. Fulham almost capitalised on an error by Dean Gerken when the Ipswich goalkeeper fumbled David's 20-yard shot but he made amends to deny Dembélé with his legs. Although Fulham were enjoying the majority of possession, Ipswich continued to create chances, and it was the hosts who broke the deadlock in the 32nd minute when Luke Hyam's incisive through ball released Daryl Murphy, who outpaced Shaun Hutchinson before making no mistake with a powerful finish. Ipswich doubled their advantage on 62 minutes: Murphy was again too strong for Hutchinson on the left wing and, while his low cross was half cleared, it fell perfectly for David McGoldrick. It was now comfortable for the hosts with Fulham looking a beaten outfit well before the final whistle. Anthony Wordsworth should have added a third 11 minutes from time when he headed over from ten yards following excellent work from McGoldrick and Luke Chambers. McGoldrick called Jesse Joronen into action from the corner of the penalty area after yet more tenacious play by Jay Tabb, before Fulham pulled a goal back out of nothing: Tim Hoogland cut inside Tyrone Mings and his weak shot took a wicked deflection off the body of Tommy Smith to take it past Gerken's near post. The lifeline galvanised Fulham and another deflection almost gave substitute Patrick Roberts an equaliser, but Ipswich held on to claim all three points.

Felix Magath dropped £11,000,000 signing Ross McCormack to the bench after claiming that the former Leeds striker was not fully fit, causing Soccer Saturday presenter Jeff Stelling to query why Magath was not selecting McCormack, Kostas Mitroglou, or Bryan Ruiz, whose total transfer fees were £32,000,000. Hugo Rodallega returned, one of four changes following the 2–1 opening-day defeat away to Ipswich. In the 12th minute, there seemed little danger as Ricardo Fuller crossed from the left, but Fulham captain Scott Parker's attempt to head clear only flicked the ball away from his stranded goalkeeper, Jesse Joronen, and into the path of Martyn Woolford, who scored with ease, causing a furious argument between Parker and Joronen. Fulham looked for a reply. The energetic young home side often had Millwall at full stretch as they played short passes at speed but defenders produced a series of blocks to deny the hosts. Scott Malone almost scored a second goal for Millwall with a dipping volley after 36 minutes, but Joronen did well to palm it over the crossbar. Magath sent on McCormack after the interval and he almost created the equaliser in the 47th minute, his pass giving Rodallega the chance to send Forde sprawling to save a low shot. But Joronen had to rescue his team again in the 57th minute, blocking Malone's shot with his right foot after Scott McDonald had created the opening. Just before the hour, Parker slipped a pass to McCormack that seemed to have provided his first goal for Fulham. But Forde was equal to the shot although Fulham, galvanised by McCormack, were getting closer. Rodallega's shot on the turn beat Forde but Dunne cleared the ball from the goalline. And then Forde blocked again from McCormack after he had bustled past Mark Beevers, and Millwall held on to keep Fulham on no points.

Magath pleaded before the match against Wolverhampton Wanderers for the fans to be patient with his young team – he made five changes to the side beaten by Millwall and started with six players aged 21 or younger. Wolves tore into Fulham from the off, with Dave Edwards flashing an early shot across goal and wide and Jesse Joronen having to charge out of his goal to save at the feet of Rajiv van la Parra. But on 15 minutes, Scott Golbourne's low corner was dummied by Edwards and allowed to run all the way to Bakary Sako, who drilled it into the bottom corner, with Mark Fotheringham wandering off the post which he was marking. Fulham tried to respond and Kostas Stafylidis fired narrowly over and then put in a dangerous cross which Tim Hoogland could not get a clean header on. But they almost found themselves two down before the interval when Wolves skipper Danny Batth got his head to Sako's free-kick only to nod the ball inches wide. Magath's response was to throw on another youngster, Dembélé, and the 18-year-old almost made an instant impact with a low shot which Carl Ikeme tipped around his post. But with Ross McCormack again isolated up front - the £11,000,000 striker resorted to coming back and collecting the ball from his centre-halves during the second half - Fulham rarely threatened an equaliser. The Scot's one sight of goal arrived just before the hour mark and his drive from the edge of the area was always rising as it cleared Ikeme's crossbar. Instead it was Wolves who always looked like adding to their tally, with Matt Doherty and Batth both missing the target with close-range headers before Sako blew their best chance in stoppage time, hitting the post with a penalty after Cameron Burgess tripped Nouha Dicko. Throughout the second half and after the full-time whistle, "Felix out" could be heard amongst the Fulham fans, and Magath did not acknowledge the fans when walking off, as Fulham slipped into the bottom three.

Crucially, Fulham made only one change from the much-maligned team that had lost against Wolverhampton: Derby had a chance in the third minute when Cyrus Christie found Johnny Russell just inside the area, but the Scot volleyed over. Parker's measured passing got the Londoners moving but Derby had another opening in the 13th minute when the ball dropped invitingly to Christie, but he shot straight at Jesse Joronen from 15 yards. Fulham were being stretched by Derby's movement, and in the 23rd minute they were behind when Russell crossed from the right and Jamie Ward steered a volley from eight yards into the roof of the net. Fulham needed a spark of inspiration, and Ross McCormack nearly supplied it in the 37th minute with a shot from just inside his own half which Lee Grant had to back-pedal to take under his crossbar. Fulham had created little but they were level in the 54th minute when McCormack chipped the ball in and Ryan Williams laid it to Parker who placed a low shot from 15 yards inside Grant's right post. It stung Derby into a rousing response that brought them two goals in three minutes to leave Fulham sliding to another defeat. First, Jeff Hendrick played in Russell on the left in the 59th minute and his ball back across was swept past Joronen by Craig Bryson. Fulham's defence was exposed again in the 61st minute when Chris Martin was allowed to turn just inside the right side of the area and the striker arrowed a low shot across the keeper for his first Championship goal of the season. The closing minutes were a nightmare for Fulham as Martin tapped in after Simon Dawkins hit a post in the 87th minute, before Fulham conceded straight from the kick-off to leave the travelling supporters chanting "Felix out" once again.

Fulham hit their first win after beating Brentford 1–0 at Griffin Park in the League Cup in the first competitive meeting between the sides since 1998. The win gave Fulham momentum for the game against Cardiff City. However, on the eve of the game, former chairman Mohamed Al Fayed had labelled Magath an "odd man", while also taking a swipe at "absent landlord" Shahid Khan. However, Fulham started brightly: Ross McCormack curled wide a first-time effort, and in the 22nd minute, Parker played the ball wide to McCormack on the left, with the forward's cross glanced across the goalkeeper by Hoogland. McCormack hit a post direct from a corner five minutes later and Emerson Hyndman powered wide as the hosts upped the ante, with the impressive Chris David twice wasting free-kicks from decent positions. The hosts were made to rue a series of missed chances in the 55th minute when Kenwyne Jones shrugged off his man to win a header and collected the return ball from Mats Daelhi to slot home. It finished 1–1, and at the final whistle, there were boos from pockets of Fulham fans.

=== September ===
Against Reading, Fulham had begun brightly, with Ross McCormack volleying over from close range after a header from debutante Matt Smith. But they went behind in the 15th minute from Reading's first meaningful attack, led by Jordan Obita along the left flank. Obita crossed early and Glenn Murray dived forward to head in from close range for his first goal for the club. Three minutes later, it got worse for Fulham. Smith went in late and high on a Reading player and referee Mike Jones issued the red card immediately. Reading swiftly assumed control. Gábor Király, on his Fulham debut, was in action multiple times, but the pressure inevitably told, with a second goal arriving in the 54th minute when Murray nodded in a precise corner from Obita from close range. It was too much for the 2,745 Fulham fans, who voiced their displeasure at manager Magath: "You're getting sacked in the morning" was followed by further choruses of "Felix out". Then Király tipped a header from home substitute Pavel Pogrebnyak – a former Fulham player – against the crossbar and Taylor drove narrowly wide from distance. But Fulham could not hold out at 2–0 until the end. In the 85th minute, substitute Blackman ran through, went by Király and slotted the ball home. Fulham's misery was complete.

In a bid to arrest his side's slump, Magath made five changes to his Fulham starting XI, with Kostas Stafylidis, Shaun Hutchinson, Mark Fotheringham and Hugo Rodallega all returning, while Fernando Amorebieta was handed his first outing of the campaign. The resulting formation caused the commentator on BBC Radio 5 Live Sports Extra to announce that Fulham had so many centre backs he had no idea of the formation: Fulham played six defenders in a 6–1–1–1–1 formation. Despite a bright early start, it took just nine minutes for Fulham to get that familiar sinking feeling as Forest took the lead with their first attack of the game. Antonio was upended by Nikolay Bodurov and, from Henri Lansbury's whipped-in free-kick, Britt Assombalonga rose to head powerfully past Gábor Király. Assombalonga increased Fulham's woes from the penalty spot after 20 minutes. Antonio's brilliant run into the visitors' area was crudely halted by Hutchinson, who was duly booked – as was Dan Burn, who manhandled referee Darren Deadman – and Assombalonga fired his kick into the bottom corner. The Fulham manager sat motionless by the dugout as chants of "Felix out" rang out from the small pocket of Cottagers supporters situated behind Király's goal. But just past the hour mark, Jack Hunt's foul on Stafylidis presented £11 million-man McCormack with a free shot on goal, and he hauled Fulham back into the match by delivering a stunning set-piece past the despairing dive of Darlow for his first league goal for the Cottagers. Rodallega should have levelled as he latched on to a through ball, but as he rounded Darlow and shot goalwards, a defender rushed back to clear off the line. Bodurov fired over when unmarked in the Forest box as Fulham came out with renewed vigour, and their early energy was rewarded when Amorebieta's cross was smartly diverted home by Rodallega. Amazingly, Fulham grabbed the lead after 64 minutes, with McCormack firing the Londoners ahead following a three-man move between himself, Rodallega and substitute Chris David. But Forest awoke from their slumber to restore parity after 77 minutes as Antonio latched on to a brilliant pass from skipper Michael Mancienne to crack home a shot into the corner. And after looking almost dead and buried, Forest suddenly found themselves ahead two minutes later when Assombalonga's header hit a post, but he reacted quickest to stab the ball home. Forest then sealed victory in the 89th minute when Paterson ran through on goal to calmly dispatch the ball past Kiraly from 15 yards.

That proved to be enough for Shahid Khan to sack Magath, and announced that Kit Symons would temporarily assume caretaker manager whilst he appointed a five-man committee to find a new manager. Symons's first game in charge was against Blackburn Rovers. Symons made three changes – including Bryan Ruiz's first Fulham appearance since December 2013 – for a match attended by former captain Brede Hangeland, as well with former fan favourite Steve Sidwell, but as half-time approached, Hutchinson launched into an ill-advised, over-zealous challenge on Lee Williamson, leaving the midfielder in a heap. Referee Andy D'Urso gave a straight red card and, after several minutes of treatment, the Rovers man left the field on a stretcher. The sending off gave Rovers the upper hand and Rudy Gestede's attempt to find an opener at the start of the second half had to be well saved by the returning Marcus Bettinelli. Fulham soon had to scramble away a Craig Conway free-kick, before eventually falling behind in the 58th minute. Fulham refused to give in, though, and an excellent counter-attack involving Parker and Tim Hoogland would have been turned in by Ross McCormack was it not for a fine Steele save. Ruiz and Rodallega saw penalty appeals waved away soon after, before Blackburn came close in quick succession as Dan Burn blocked a Rhodes effort after rounding Bettinelli before a Gestede header deflected just wide.

Fulham then progressed in the League Cup after seeing off Doncaster Rovers, courtesy of Bryan Ruiz and Dan Burn goals. This boosted morale for the trip to Saint Andrew's for the game against Birmingham City, who had only won one of their last 23 games at home. Fulham hardly began as a bottom of the table side, as demonstrated by Ross McCormack when he flashed in a free-kick which Darren Randolph had to desperately finger-tip away to safety. But it was Birmingham who then took command and David Cotterill, who had created numerous goal opportunities throughout the season, found himself in a goalscoring position when he latched onto a pass from Mark Duffy only to screw his effort wide with only goalkeeper Marcus Bettinelli to beat. Fulham's problem was highlighted in the 19th minute when the industrious McCormack produced an accurate cross from the right only for Rodallega to fail to make a clean contact just yards away from the Birmingham goal. Birmingham continued to benefit from Cotterill's good delivery and another chance went begging as David Edgar headed wide from the former Burnley player's corner kick. Finally, in the 37th minute, they finally broke the stalemate with a solo goal. Callum Reilly pushed a pass into the path of Cotterill. He looked up and decided to fire in a shot from fully 25 yards which whistled into the top far corner of the net. Fulham were boosted by a 63rd-minute equaliser from Hoogland: Nikolay Bodurov's cross was deflected to Hoogland who saw his shot also deflected into the net. The winner came courtesy of a bad mistake by Jonathan Spector. He attempted to push the ball back to his goalkeeper only for the ball to cannon to Rodallega to capitalise upon the mistake and score with an angled shot after 71 minutes to give the whites their first win of the season in the League.

== Transfers ==
=== In ===
Date	Pos.	Name	From	Fee	Source
16 June 2014	DF	(England) Shaun Hutchinson	(Scotland) Motherwell	Free	
24 June 2014	FW	(Australia) Adam Taggart	(Australia) Newcastle Jets	Undisclosed	
25 June 2014	DF	(Germany) Tim Hoogland	(Germany) Schalke 04	Free	
2 July 2014	DF	(Switzerland) Kay Voser	(Switzerland) Basel	Undisclosed	
8 July 2014	FW	(Scotland) Ross McCormack	(England) Leeds United	Undisclosed (reported £11,000,000)	
23 July 2014	MF	(Germany) Thomas Eisfeld	(England) Arsenal	Undisclosed	
23 July 2014	MF	(Morocco) Adil Chihi	(Germany) 1. FC Köln	Free	
1 August 2014	DF	(Bulgaria) Nikolay Bodurov	(Bulgaria) Litex Lovech	Undisclosed	
8 August 2014	MF	(Scotland) Mark Fotheringham	(England) Notts County	Free	
9 August 2014	FW	(Serbia) Andrija Lazović	(Serbia) FK Crvena Zvezda	Undisclosed	
15 August 2014	MF	(Bosnia and Herzegovina) Dino Fazlić	(Switzerland) Grasshoppers	Free	
22 August 2014	DF	(Argentina) Tiago Casasola	(Argentina) Boca Juniors	Undisclosed	
28 August 2014	GK	(Hungary) Gábor Király	(Germany) 1860 Munich	Free	
1 September 2014	FW	(England) Matt Smith	(England) Leeds United	£500,000	
3 February 2015	DF	(Wales) Aron Davis	(England) Bristol City	Undisclosed	

=== Loans in ===
Date	Pos.	Name	From	End date	Source
9 July 2014	DF	(Greece) Kostas Stafylidis	(Germany) Bayer Leverkusen	30 June 2015	
27 November 2014	MF	(France) Seko Fofana	(England) Manchester City	30 June 2015	
24 January 2015	DF	(Wales) Jazz Richards	(England) Swansea City	30 June 2015	
12 March 2015	DF	(England) Michael Turner	(England) Norwich City	30 June 2015	
25 March 2015	DF	(England) James Husband	(England) Middlesbrough	30 June 2015	
26 March 2015	MF	(England) Danny Guthrie	(England) Reading	30 June 2015	
26 March 2015	GK	(England) Richard Lee	(England) Brentford	30 June 2015	

=== Out ===
Date	Pos.	Name	New club	Fee	Source
16 May 2014	FW	(Bulgaria) Dimitar Berbatov	(France) Monaco	Free	
23 May 2014	GK	(Philippines) Neil Etheridge	(England) Oldham Athletic	Free	
23 May 2014	DF	(England) Matthew Briggs	(England) Millwall	Free	
23 May 2014	DF	(Netherlands) John Heitinga	(Germany) Hertha BSC	Free	
23 May 2014	DF	(Norway) John Arne Riise	(Cyprus) APOEL	Free	
23 May 2014	MF	(Republic of Ireland) Damien Duff	(Australia) Melbourne City	Free	
23 May 2014	MF	(England) Steve Sidwell	(England) Stoke City	Free	
23 May 2014	MF	(Greece) Giorgos Karagounis	Released		
23 May 2014	MF	(Mali) Mahamadou Diarra	Released		
23 May 2014	MF	(Ghana) Derek Boateng	(Spain) Rayo Vallecano	Free	
23 May 2014	MF	(England) Charles Banya	(England) Crawley Town	Free	
23 May 2014	MF	(Sweden) Dino Islamović	(Netherlands) Groningen	Free	
23 May 2014	MF	(Germany) Ronny Minkwitz	(Switzerland) Wohlen	Free	
23 May 2014	GK	(Germany) Max Oberschmidt	(Germany) Energie Cottbus	Free	
23 May 2014	MF	(Wales) Josh Pritchard	(England) Gillingham	Free	
23 May 2014	MF	(England) Alex Brister	Released		
3 June 2014	DF	(Norway) Brede Hangeland	(England) Crystal Palace	Free	
26 June 2014	DF	(Germany) Sascha Riether	(Germany) SC Freiburg	Undisclosed	
26 June 2014	FW	(Sweden) Muamer Tanković	(Netherlands) AZ	Free	
9 July 2014	MF	(Switzerland) Pajtim Kasami	(Greece) Olympiacos	£4,400,000	
11 July 2014	MF	(England) Kieran Richardson	(England) Aston Villa	£600,000	
28 July 2014	GK	(England) David Stockdale	(England) Brighton & Hove Albion	Undisclosed	
29 July 2014	MF	(Iran) Ashkan Dejagah	(Qatar) Al-Arabi	£5,000,000	
9 January 2015	FW	(Italy) Marcello Trotta	(Italy) Avellino	Undisclosed	
30 January 2015	MF	(Scotland) Mark Fotheringham	Released		
16 February 2015	DF	(Montenegro) Elsad Zverotić	(Switzerland) Sion	Free	
16 February 2015	MF	(Bosnia and Herzegovina) Dino Fazlić	(Croatia) Zadar	Free	

=== Loans out ===
Date	Pos.	Name	To	End date	Source
9 August 2014	GK	(Netherlands) Maarten Stekelenburg	(France) Monaco	30 June 2015	
31 August 2014	FW	(Greece) Konstantinos Mitroglou	(Greece) Olympiacos	30 June 2015	
1 September 2014	MF	(England) Ryan Tunnicliffe	(England) Blackburn Rovers	1 January 2015	
1 September 2014	MF	(Sweden) Alexander Kačaniklić	(Denmark) Copenhagen	22 December 2014	
2 October 2014	MF	(Australia) Ryan Williams	(England) Barnsley	1 January 2015	
17 October 2014	GK	(Finland) Jesse Joronen	(England) Accrington Stanley	18 November 2014	
18 October 2014	DF	(Scotland) Jack Grimmer	(England) Shrewsbury Town	18 November 2014	
31 October 2014	DF	(England) Stephen Arthurworrey	(England) Yeovil Town	30 June 2015	
1 November 2014	FW	(Italy) Marcello Trotta	(England) Barnsley	5 January 2015	
6 November 2014	MF	(England) Lyle Della Verde	(England) Bristol Rovers	4 January 2015	
27 November 2014	DF	(England) Josh Passley	(England) Shrewsbury Town	5 January 2015	
27 November 2014	FW	(England) Matt Smith	(England) Bristol City	1 March 2015	
9 January 2015	GK	(Slovakia) Marek Rodák	(England) Farnborough	5 March 2015	
16 January 2015	DF	(Australia) Cameron Burgess	(Scotland) Ross County	30 June 2015	
29 January 2015	DF	(England) Josh Passley	(England) Portsmouth	30 June 2015	
31 January 2015	MF	(Netherlands) Chris David	(Netherlands) Twente	30 June 2015	
2 February 2015	MF	(Germany) Thomas Eisfeld	(Germany) VfL Bochum	30 June 2015	
16 February 2015	FW	(Wales) George Williams	(England) Milton Keynes Dons	9 March 2015	
20 February 2015	DF	(England) Tom Richards	(England) Aldershot Town	30 June 2015	
5 March 2015	GK	(England) Magnus Norman	(England) Farnborough	5 May 2015	
25 March 2015	DF	(Venezuela) Fernando Amorebieta	(England) Middlesbrough	30 June 2015	

== Fixtures and results ==
=== Pre-season friendlies ===
5 July 2014	East Fife	0–3	Fulham	Methil, Fife
15:00 BST		Report	Zverotić 52'; Rodallega 61'; Woodrow 71'	Stadium: Bayview Stadium; Referee: Brian Calvin

10 July 2014	Rangers	4–2	Fulham	Glasgow, Scotland
11:30 BST	Miller 11'; Macleod 20'; Law 67'; Faure 73'	Report	Dembélé 18'; Rodallega 28'	Stadium: Rangers Training Centre

12 July 2014	Motherwell	0–2	Fulham	Motherwell, Scotland
14:00 BST		Report	Burgess 19'; Stafylidis 53'	Stadium: Fir Park

19 July 2014	Crawley Town	0–2	Fulham	Crawley, England
15:00 BST		Report	Stafylidis 32'; Rodallega 35'	Stadium: Checkatrade.com Stadium

26 July 2014	D.C. United Reserves	0–3	Fulham	Jacksonville, Florida, United States
23:00 BST		Report	Dembélé 22', 44', 75'	Stadium: EverBank Field; Attendance: 52,961

2 August 2014	Çaykur Rizespor	0–1	Fulham	Jenbach, Austria
13:00 BST		Report	Woodrow 87'	Stadium: Jenbach Stadium, Austria

=== Friendlies during season ===
9 October 2014	Fulham	3–3	Cardiff City	Motspur Park, London
	Smith 33', 62'; David 51'	Report	Southam 3'; Johnson 83' (pen.); Trialist 85'

13 November 2014	West Ham United	3–3	Fulham	Upton Park, London
	Vaz Tê; Carroll; Nolan	Report	Dembélé; David; Smith

11 February 2015	Tottenham Hotspur	3–1	Fulham	Enfield, London
	Akindayini; Miller		Kavanagh

=== Championship ===
The fixtures for the 2014–15 season were announced on 18 June 2014 at 9:00 am.

9 August 2014 1	Ipswich Town	2–1	Fulham	Ipswich
17:15 BST	Murphy 32'; Hyam (yellow card) 37'; McGoldrick 61'; Mings (yellow card) 81'; Berra (yellow card) 87'	Report	Hoogland 86'	Stadium: Portman Road; Attendance: 17,218; Referee: Stephen Martin

16 August 2014 2	Fulham	0–1	Millwall	Fulham
15:00 BST	Hoogland (yellow card) 47'; Bodurov (yellow card) 63'; Stafylidis (yellow card) 77'	Report	Woolford 12'	Stadium: Craven Cottage; Attendance: 18,988; Referee: Lee Mason

20 August 2014 3	Fulham	0–1	Wolverhampton Wanderers	Fulham
20:00 BST	Kavanagh (yellow card) 8'; Fotheringham (yellow card) 10'; Stafylidis (yellow card) 74'; McCormack (yellow card) 90+3'	Report	Sako 15', (penalty missed) 90+1'	Stadium: Craven Cottage; Attendance: 18,627; Referee: James Linington

23 August 2014 4	Derby County	5–1	Fulham	Derby
15:00 BST	Ward 23'; Bryson 59'; Martin 61', 87'; Dawkins 88'	Report	Parker 54'	Stadium: iPro Stadium; Attendance: 26,577; Referee: Oliver Langford

30 August 2014 5	Fulham	1–1	Cardiff City	Fulham
15:00 BST	Hoogland 22', (yellow card) 90+1'	Report	Jones 55'; Whittingham (yellow card) 90+4'	Stadium: Craven Cottage; Attendance: 17,508; Referee: James Adcock

13 September 2014 6	Reading	3–0	Fulham	Reading
15:00 BST	Murray 15', 54'; Blackman 85', (yellow card) 86'	Report	Smith (red card) 18'; Hyndman (yellow card) 28'; Voser (yellow card) 42'; Kavanagh (yellow card) 74'	Stadium: Madejski Stadium; Attendance: 18,790; Referee: Mike Jones

17 September 2014 7	Nottingham Forest	5–3	Fulham	Nottingham
19:45 BST	Assombalonga 9', 21' (pen.), 79', 79'; Antonio 77'; Paterson 89', (yellow card) 90'; Lascelles (yellow card) 90'	Report	Hutchinson (yellow card) 20'; Burn (yellow card) 20'; McCormack 31', 65'; Fotheringham (yellow card) 50'; Rodallega 51'; Amorebieta (yellow card) 58'; Bodurov (yellow card) 69'; Parker (yellow card) 73'	Stadium: City Ground; Attendance: 22,572; Referee: Darren Deadman

20 September 2014 8	Fulham	0–1	Blackburn Rovers	Fulham
15:00 BST	McCormack (yellow card) 25'; Hutchinson (red card) 45+2'; Hoogland (yellow card) 62'; Amorebieta (yellow card) 90+2'	Report	Evans (yellow card) 55'; Rhodes 58'; Taylor (yellow card) 88'	Stadium: Craven Cottage; Attendance: 16,456; Referee: Andy D'Urso

27 September 2014 9	Birmingham City	1–2	Fulham	Birmingham
15:00 BST	Cotterill 38'; Grounds (yellow card) 82'	Report	Hoogland 63'; Rodallega 71'; Stafylidis (yellow card) 88'	Stadium: St Andrew's; Attendance: 14,132; Referee: Simon Hooper

1 October 2014 10	Fulham	4–0	Bolton Wanderers	Fulham
20:00 BST	Rodallega 9'; Amorebieta 45+2'; Christensen 67'; Hoogland 79'	Report	Herd (yellow card) 77'; M. Davies (yellow card) 81'	Stadium: Craven Cottage; Attendance: 14,496; Referee: Stuart Attwell

4 October 2014 11	Middlesbrough	2–0	Fulham	Middlesbrough
15:00 BST	Fredericks (yellow card) 19'; Reach 46'; Adomah 82'	Report	Burn (yellow card) 64'	Stadium: Riverside Stadium; Attendance: 16,201; Referee: Darren Drysdale

18 October 2014 12	Fulham	1–0	Norwich City	Fulham
15:00 BST	Kavanagh 22'; Parker (yellow card) 87'; Stafylidis (yellow card) 90'	Report	Grabban (penalty missed) 47'	Stadium: Craven Cottage; Attendance: 20,776; Referee: Graham Salisbury

21 October 2014 13	Rotherham United	3–3	Fulham	Rotherham
19:45 BST	Revell 28'; Clarke-Harris 55'; Bodurov 86' (o.g.)	Report	Bettinelli (yellow card) 28'; McCormack 33' (pen.); Woodrow 58'; Burn 90'	Stadium: New York Stadium; Attendance: 8,981; Referee: Mark Brown

24 October 2014 14	Fulham	3–0	Charlton Athletic	Fulham
19:45 BST	Parker 6'; Rodallega 12', 89'	Report		Stadium: Craven Cottage; Attendance: 17,923; Referee: Keith Stroud

1 November 2014 15	Wigan Athletic	3–3	Fulham	Wigan
15:00 GMT	Forshaw 9' (pen.); McManaman (yellow card) 22'; Espinoza 54'; McClean (yellow card) 77'; Maloney 82'; Barnett (red card) 85'	Report	Christensen 30'; Bodurov (yellow card) 32'; Ruiz 36', 88' (pen.); McCormack (yellow card) 72' (yellow-red card) 77'	Stadium: DW Stadium; Attendance: 12,084; Referee: James Adcock

5 November 2014 16	Fulham	2–2	Blackpool	Fulham
20:00 GMT	Christensen (yellow card) 22'; Parker 45+1', (yellow card) 48'; Ruiz 73'	Report	Miller 2'; Murphy 26'; Clarke (yellow card) 32'; Dunne (yellow card) 33'; McMahon (red card) 41'; Perkins (yellow card) 88'	Stadium: Craven Cottage; Attendance: 14,325; Referee: Robert Madley

8 November 2014 17	Fulham	3–1	Huddersfield Town	Fulham
15:00 GMT	Rodallega 19'; Christensen (yellow card) 36', (goal) 77'; Burn (yellow card) 51'; Zverotić (yellow card) 75'; McCormack 84'	Report	Lynch 75'	Stadium: Craven Cottage; Attendance: 17,734; Referee: Andy Woolmer

21 November 2014 18	Brentford	2–1	Fulham	London
19:45 GMT	Dean (yellow card) 28', (goal) 81'; Toral (yellow card) 38'; Jota 90+1'	Report	Burn (yellow card) 29'; Zverotić (yellow card) 31'; Rodallega 57'	Stadium: Griffin Park; Attendance: 12,255; Referee: David Coote

29 November 2014 19	Brighton & Hove Albion	1–2	Fulham	Brighton
15:00 GMT	Bent 52'; Ince (yellow card) 72'; Colunga (yellow card) 89' (yellow-red card) 90+2'	Report	Grimmer (yellow card) 45+1'; Rodallega 62'; Parker (yellow card) 65'; Christensen 77'; McCormack (yellow card) 81'	Stadium: Falmer Stadium; Attendance: 28,802; Referee: Simon Hooper

5 December 2014 20	Fulham	0–5	Watford	Fulham
19:45 GMT	Bettinelli (red card) 18'	Report	Abdi 15', 51'; Deeney 20' (pen.), 37', 90+3'; Bassong (yellow card) 77'	Stadium: Craven Cottage; Attendance: 16,772; Referee: Paul Tierney

13 December 2014 21	Leeds United	0–1	Fulham	Leeds
15:00 GMT	Mowatt (yellow card) 68'	Report	Rodallega 60'	Stadium: Elland Road; Attendance: 27,264; Referee: Scott Duncan

20 December 2014 22	Fulham	4–0	Sheffield Wednesday	Fulham
15:00 GMT	Stafylidis (yellow card) 28'; McCormack 34'; Hutchinson 45'; Fofana (yellow card) 55'; Christensen 67'; Woodrow 90+3' (pen.)	Report	Loovens (yellow card) 34'; Hélan (yellow card) 45'; Semedo (yellow card) 51'	Stadium: Craven Cottage; Attendance: 21,123; Referee: Mike Jones

26 December 2014 23	Bournemouth	2–0	Fulham	Bournemouth
15:00 GMT	Pitman 9', (penalty missed) 50', (yellow card) 82'; Gosling (yellow card) 89'; Arter 90+1'	Report	Williams (yellow card) 88'	Stadium: Dean Court; Attendance: 10,926; Referee: Keith Stroud

29 December 2014 24	Fulham	0–2	Brighton & Hove Albion	Fulham
20:00 GMT	McCormack (yellow card) 84'	Report	Halford (yellow card) 29'; Colunga 60' (pen.); March 87'	Stadium: Craven Cottage; Attendance: 20,619; Referee: Graham Scott

10 January 2015 25	Cardiff City	1–0	Fulham	Cardiff
15:00 GMT	Morrison 14'	Report	Hutchinson (yellow card) 6'	Stadium: Cardiff City Stadium; Attendance: 22,515; Referee: Nigel Miller

17 January 2015 26	Fulham	2–1	Reading	Fulham
15:00 GMT	Bodurov (yellow card) 33'; Kačaniklić (yellow card) 52', (goal) 55'; Tunnicliffe (yellow card) 74'; Ruiz 90+3'	Report	Pogrebnyak 63', (yellow card) 67'; McCleary (yellow card) 77'; Cox (yellow card) 84'; Gunter (yellow card) 90+1'	Stadium: Craven Cottage; Attendance: 17,831; Referee: Mark Brown

21 January 2015 27	Fulham	3–2	Nottingham Forest	Fulham
19:45 GMT	McCormack 7', 18', 35'; Grimmer (yellow card) 84'; Kačaniklić (yellow card) 90+3'	Report	Lansbury 45+1', 62'	Stadium: Craven Cottage; Attendance: 15,512; Referee: Andy Haines

31 January 2015 28	Blackburn Rovers	2–1	Fulham	Blackburn
15:00 GMT	Marshall 12'; Rhodes 61'	Report	McCormack 66'	Stadium: Ewood Park; Attendance: 13,603; Referee: Dean Whitestone

7 February 2015 29	Fulham	1–1	Birmingham City	Fulham
15:00 GMT	Rodallega 5'	Report	Cotterill 14'; Shinnie (yellow card) 44'	Stadium: Craven Cottage; Attendance: 19,086; Referee: Fred Graham

10 February 2015 30	Bolton Wanderers	3–1	Fulham	Bolton
20:00 GMT	Guðjohnsen 44'; Janko 80'; Le Fondre 89'	Report	Hutchinson 21'	Stadium: Macron Stadium; Attendance: 12,790; Referee: Gary Sutton (referee)

14 February 2015 31	Fulham	1–2	Ipswich Town	Fulham
15:00 GMT	McCormack 74'; Tunnicliffe (yellow card) 89'	Report	Murphy 5', 45'; Berra (yellow card) 59'; Bru (yellow card) 80'; Skuse (yellow card) 83'	Stadium: Craven Cottage; Attendance: 19,816; Referee: Mark Haywood

21 February 2015 32	Millwall	0–0	Fulham	London
15:00 GMT	Abdou (yellow card) 72'	Report		Stadium: The Den; Attendance: 12,707; Referee: Keith Hill

24 February 2015 33	Wolverhampton Wanderers	3–0	Fulham	Wolverhampton
19:45 GMT	Batth 10'; Sako 42', 45+2'	Report		Stadium: Molineux; Attendance: 17,744; Referee: Graham Salisbury

28 February 2015 34	Fulham	2–0	Derby County	Fulham
15:00 GMT	Tunnicliffe (yellow card) 11'; Bodurov 31'; Woodrow 45'	Report	Russell (yellow card) 90+1'	Stadium: Craven Cottage; Attendance: 20,242; Referee: Mike Jones

3 March 2015 35	Watford	1–0	Fulham	London
19:45 GMT	Deeney 9'; Guedioura (yellow card) 83'	Report	Fofana (yellow card) 53'; Richards (yellow card) 59'	Stadium: Vicarage Road; Attendance: 15,809; Referee: Trevor Kettle

6 March 2015 36	Fulham	1–5	Bournemouth	Fulham
19:45 GMT	Smith 66'; Amorebieta (red card) 69'; Fofana (yellow card) 89'	Report	Pitman 29', 61'; Ritchie 37', 71'; Cook 84'	Stadium: Craven Cottage; Attendance: 16,317; Referee: Andy Madley

14 March 2015 37	Sheffield Wednesday	1–1	Fulham	Sheffield
15:00 GMT	May 55'; Vermijl (yellow card) 58'; Lee (yellow card) 64'	Report	Smith 75'; Turner (yellow card) 78'	Stadium: Hillsborough; Attendance: 22,182; Referee: Andy Woolmer

18 March 2015 38	Fulham	0–3	Leeds United	Fulham
20:00 GMT	Stafylidis (yellow card) 51' (yellow-red card) 52'	Report	Byram 40'; Sharp (yellow card) 46'; Bamba 48', (yellow card) 87'; Antenucci 88'	Stadium: Craven Cottage; Attendance: 19,200; Referee: Chris Kavanagh

21 March 2015 39	Huddersfield Town	0–2	Fulham	Huddersfield
15:00 GMT	Wells (penalty missed) 61', (penalty missed) 72'	Report	Kačaniklić 2'; Hoogland (yellow card) 45+1'; Smith (yellow card) 48'; Hutchinson (red card) 60'; Richards (yellow card) 72'; Bettinelli (yellow card) 72'; Fofana 90+6', (yellow card) 90+7'	Stadium: John Smith's Stadium; Attendance: 11,635; Referee: Richard Clark

3 April 2015 40	Fulham	1–4	Brentford	Fulham
15:00 BST	McCormack 67' (pen.)	Report	Dallas 24', 58'; Odubajo (yellow card) 51'; Judge (yellow card) 85', (goal) 90'; Jota 90+4'; Diagouraga (yellow card) 90+6'	Stadium: Craven Cottage; Attendance: 23,271; Referee: Simon Hooper

7 April 2015 41	Charlton Athletic	1–1	Fulham	London
19:45 BST	Guðmundsson 16'; Ben Haim (yellow card) 30'	Report	McCormack 8'; Burn (yellow card) 57'; Parker (yellow card) 70'	Stadium: The Valley; Attendance: 16,521; Referee: Andy Madley

10 April 2015 42	Fulham	2–2	Wigan Athletic	Fulham
20:00 BST	McCormack 4'; Burn (yellow card) 27'; Smith 35'; Kavanagh (yellow card) 45'	Report	Pennant 22'; Pearce 69'	Stadium: Craven Cottage; Attendance: 15,994; Referee: Mick Russell

15 April 2015 43	Fulham	1–1	Rotherham United	Fulham
20:00 BST	Guthrie (yellow card) 54'; McCormack 67'; Burn (yellow card) 81'; Turner (yellow card) 86'	Report	Derbyshire 4'; Broadfoot (yellow card) 73'	Stadium: Craven Cottage; Attendance: 15,011; Referee: Andy Davies

18 April 2015 44	Blackpool	0–1	Fulham	Blackpool
15:00 BST		Report	Smith 8'; Turner (yellow card) 28'; Hoogland (yellow card) 78'	Stadium: Bloomfield Road; Attendance: 10,122; Referee: Eddie Ilderton

25 April 2015 45	Fulham	4–3	Middlesbrough	Fulham
15:00 BST	Kavanagh (yellow card) 42'; Turner 45+1'; Guthrie (yellow card) 50'; McCormack 55' (pen.), 67' (pen.), 90+4'	Report	Adomah (yellow card) 33'; Gibson (yellow card) 59'; Reach 63'; Friend (red card) 66'; Ayala 73'; Kike 88'	Stadium: Craven Cottage; Attendance: 22,731; Referee: Kevin Friend

2 May 2015 46	Norwich City	4–2	Fulham	Norwich
12:15 BST	Johnson (yellow card) 23', (goal) 36', 90+1'; Redmond 39'; Olsson (yellow card) 75'; Dorrans 81'	Report	Smith 83'; Guthrie (yellow card) 90'; Johnson 90+2' (o.g.)	Stadium: Carrow Road; Attendance: 26,662; Referee: David Coote

=== Results summary ===
Overall								Home						Away					
Pld	W	D	L	GF	GA	GD	Pts	W	D	L	GF	GA	GD	W	D	L	GF	GA	GD
46	14	10	22	62	83	−21	52	9	5	9	36	38	−2	5	5	13	26	45	−19

Last updated: 2 May 2015.
Source: Sky Sports

=== Results by matchday ===
Matchday	1	2	3	4	5	6	7	8	9	10	11	12	13	14	15	16	17	18	19	20	21	22	23	24	25	26	27	28	29	30	31	32	33	34	35	36	37	38	39	40	41	42	43	44	45	46
Ground	A	H	H	A	H	A	A	H	A	H	A	H	A	H	A	H	H	A	A	H	A	H	A	H	A	H	H	A	H	A	H	A	A	H	A	H	A	H	A	H	A	H	H	A	H	A
Result	L	L	L	L	D	L	L	L	W	W	L	W	D	W	D	D	W	L	W	L	W	W	L	L	L	W	W	L	D	L	L	D	L	W	L	L	D	L	W	L	D	D	D	W	W	L
Position	17	21	23	24	23	24	24	24	23	22	22	22	22	19	20	21	17	17	16	16	14	13	15	17	18	15	14	15	16	18	19	19	20	19	20	20	20	21	20	20	20	20	20	18	17	17

Updated to match(es) played on 2 May 2015. Source: Statto.com
A = Away; H = Home; W = Win; D = Draw; L = Loss

=== Football League Cup ===
Fulham were granted a bye in to the second round of the League Cup.

26 August 2014 2nd round	Brentford	0–1	Fulham	Griffin Park, London
19:45 BST		Report	Voser (yellow card) 44'; McCormack 68'	Attendance: 7,563; Referee: Scott Duncan

23 September 2014 3rd round	Fulham	2–1	Doncaster Rovers	Craven Cottage, London
20:00 BST	Bettinelli (yellow card) 10'; Ruiz 16'; Burn 32', (yellow card) 90+6'; Bodurov (yellow card) 80'	Report	Coppinger 60'; Robinson (penalty missed) 79'	Attendance: 8,070; Referee: Kevin Friend

28 October 2014 4th round	Fulham	2–5	Derby County	Craven Cottage, London
20:00 GMT	Dembélé 27', 45'	Report	Martin 45+2' (pen.); Russell 47'; Buxton (yellow card) 52'; Dawkins 54', 65'; Mascarell (yellow card) 60'; Hendrick 62'	Attendance: 15,156; Referee: Graham Scott

=== FA Cup ===
Fulham were granted a bye into the third round of the FA Cup.

3 January 2015 3rd round	Fulham	0–0	Wolverhampton Wanderers	Craven Cottage, London
15:00 GMT	Parker (yellow card) 17'	Report	Evans (yellow card) 69'	Attendance: 11,879; Referee: Lee Probert

13 January 2015 3rd round replay	Wolverhampton Wanderers	3–3 (a.e.t.) (3–5 p)	Fulham	Molineux, Wolverhampton
19:45 GMT	Edwards 71', 109'; Van La Parra 73'	Report	Woodrow 27', 76', (yellow card) 59'; McCormack (yellow card) 90+4', (goal) 120+2' (pen.)	Attendance: 8,148; Referee: David Coote
	Penalties
	Edwards (penalty scored); Doherty (penalty missed); Evans (penalty scored); Clarke (penalty scored)		(penalty scored) McCormack; (penalty scored) Woodrow; (penalty scored) Stafylidis; (penalty scored) Roberts; (penalty scored) Rodallega

24 January 2015 4th round	Sunderland	0–0	Fulham	Stadium of Light, Sunderland
15:00 GMT	Rodwell (yellow card) 30' (yellow-red card) 66'; Coates (yellow card) 55'; Buckley (yellow card) 86'	Report		Attendance: 22,961; Referee: Anthony Taylor

3 February 2015 4th round replay	Fulham	1–3	Sunderland	Craven Cottage, London
19:45 GMT	Rodallega 28'; Woodrow (yellow card) 40'; Bodurov (yellow card) 62'; Fofana (yellow card) 82'; McCormack (yellow card) 89'; Hutchinson (yellow card) 90+5'	Report	Bridcutt (yellow card) 25'; Bettinelli 61' (o.g.); Álvarez 75', (yellow card) 82'; Giaccherini (yellow card) 82'; Gómez 90+3' (pen.)	Attendance: 14,777; Referee: Paul Tierney

== Competitions ==
=== Overall ===
Competition	Started round	Current position / round	Final position / round	First match	Last match
Championship	—	—	17th	9 August 2014	2 May 2015
League Cup	Second round	—	Fourth round	26 August 2014	28 October 2014
FA Cup	Third round	—	Fourth round	3 January 2015	3 February 2015

Updated to match played 2 May 2015
Source: Competitions

=== Championship table ===
Pos	Team	Pld	W	D	L	GF	GA	GD	Pts
15	Leeds United	46	15	11	20	50	61	−11	56
16	Huddersfield Town	46	13	16	17	58	75	−17	55
17	Fulham	46	14	10	22	62	83	−21	52
18	Bolton Wanderers	46	13	12	21	54	67	−13	51
19	Reading	46	13	11	22	48	69	−21	50

Updated to match(es) played on 2 May 2015. Source: Sky Sports
Rules for classification: 1) Points; 2) Goal difference; 3) Number of goals scored

== Squad statistics ==
=== Appearances & goals ===
Last updated 2 May 2015

- Players listed with no appearances have been in the matchday squad but only as unused substitutes.

No.	Pos	Nat	Player	Total		Championship		League Cup		FA Cup	
No.	Pos	Nat	Player	Apps	Goals	Apps	Goals	Apps	Goals	Apps	Goals
1	GK	(Hungary) HUN	Gabor Kiraly	5	0	3+1	0	1+0	0	0+0	0
2	DF	(Germany) GER	Tim Hoogland	27	4	21+3	4	3+0	0	0+0	0
3	DF	(Greece) GRE	Kostas Stafylidis (on loan from Bayer Leverkusen)	44	0	34+4	0	2+0	0	4+0	0
4	DF	(England) ENG	Shaun Hutchinson	31	2	25+0	2	2+0	0	4+0	0
6	DF	(Bulgaria) BUL	Nikolay Bodurov	44	1	36+2	1	1+1	0	4+0	0
8	MF	(England) ENG	Scott Parker	41	3	35+2	3	1+1	0	2+0	0
9	FW	(England) ENG	Matt Smith	15	5	8+7	5	0+0	0	0+0	0
10	FW	(Costa Rica) CRC	Bryan Ruiz	32	5	23+6	4	2+0	1	1+0	0
11	MF	(Sweden) SWE	Alexander Kačaniklić	16	2	8+6	2	0+0	0	1+1	0
12	MF	(France) FRA	Seko Fofana (on loan from Manchester City)	26	1	13+9	1	0+0	0	4+0	0
13	MF	(England) ENG	Danny Guthrie (on loan from Reading)	6	0	6+0	0	0+0	0	0+0	0
14	FW	(England) ENG	Patrick Roberts	20	0	2+15	0	1+0	0	0+2	0
15	DF	(Switzerland) SUI	Kay Voser	4	0	2+1	0	1+0	0	0+0	0
16	FW	(England) ENG	Cauley Woodrow	33	5	10+18	3	1+0	0	4+0	2
18	DF	(England) ENG	Michael Turner (on loan from Norwich City)	8	1	8+0	1	0+0	0	0+0	0
19	MF	(England) ENG	Ryan Tunnicliffe	24	0	22+0	0	0+0	0	2+0	0
20	FW	(Colombia) COL	Hugo Rodallega	38	11	30+3	10	1+0	0	2+2	1
21	MF	(Denmark) DEN	Lasse Vigen Christensen	29	5	24+1	5	1+0	0	2+1	0
24	DF	(England) ENG	James Husband (on loan from Middlesbrough)	5	0	5+0	0	0+0	0	0+0	0
25	FW	(France) FRA	Moussa Dembélé	15	2	2+9	0	1+0	2	2+1	0
27	FW	(Wales) WAL	George Williams	16	0	7+7	0	1+1	0	0+0	0
29	DF	(Wales) WAL	Jazz Richards (on loan from Swansea City)	14	0	14+0	0	0+0	0	0+0	0
28	MF	(United States) USA	Emerson Hyndman	11	0	9+0	0	2+0	0	0+0	0
32	DF	(Republic of Ireland) IRL	Sean Kavanagh	22	1	13+5	1	1+1	0	1+1	0
33	DF	(England) ENG	Dan Burn	22	2	20+0	1	2+0	1	0+0	0
34	MF	(Morocco) MAR	Adil Chihi	1	0	0+1	0	0+0	0	0+0	0
37	DF	(Scotland) SCO	Jack Grimmer	17	0	13+0	0	0+0	0	4+0	0
39	MF	(Australia) AUS	Ryan Williams	3	0	1+1	0	1+0	0	0+0	0
40	GK	(England) ENG	Marcus Bettinelli	45	0	39+0	0	2+0	0	4+0	0
41	GK	(Finland) FIN	Jesse Joronen	4	0	4+0	0	0+0	0	0+0	0
42	GK	(Slovakia) SVK	Marek Rodák	0	0	0+0	0	0+0	0	0+0	0
43	DF	(Northern Ireland) NIR	Liam Donnelly	0	0	0+0	0	0+0	0	0+0	0
44	FW	(Scotland) SCO	Ross McCormack	51	19	43+1	17	2+1	1	3+1	1
99	DF	(Serbia) SRB	Andrija Lazović	40	0	40+0	0	0+0	0	0+0	0
Players who left the club during the season
13	DF	(Montenegro) MNE	Elsad Zverotić	12	0	5+5	0	1+0	0	0+1	0
26	MF	(Scotland) SCO	Mark Fotheringham	3	0	2+0	0	0+1	0	0+0	0
Out on loan
5	DF	(Venezuela) VEN	Fernando Amorebieta	9	1	8+0	1	1+0	0	0+0	0
7	MF	(Germany) GER	Thomas Eisfeld	9	0	2+5	0	0+2	0	0+0	0
30	MF	(Netherlands) NED	Chris David	7	0	3+2	0	1+1	0	0+0	0
31	DF	(England) ENG	Stephen Arthurworrey	1	0	0+0	0	1+0	0	0+0	0
38	DF	(Australia) AUS	Cameron Burgess	4	0	4+0	0	0+0	0	0+0	0

=== Top scorers ===
Includes all competitive matches. The list is sorted by squad number when total goals are equal.

Last updated on 2 May 2015

Rank	No.	Nationality	Player	Championship	League Cup	FA Cup	Total
1	44	(Scotland)	Ross McCormack	17	1	1	19
2	20	(Colombia)	Hugo Rodallega	10	0	1	11
3
3	9	(England)	Matt Smith	5	0	0	5
3	10	(Costa Rica)	Bryan Ruiz	4	1	0	5
3	16	(England)	Cauley Woodrow	3	0	2	5
3	21	(Denmark)	Lasse Vigen Christensen	5	0	0	5
7	2	(Germany)	Tim Hoogland	4	0	0	4
8	8	(England)	Scott Parker	3	0	0	3
9
9	4	(England)	Shaun Hutchinson	2	0	0	2
9	11	(Sweden)	Alexander Kačaniklić	2	0	0	2
9	25	(France)	Moussa Dembélé	0	2	0	2
9	33	(England)	Dan Burn	1	1	0	2
13
13	5	(Venezuela)	Fernando Amorebieta	1	0	0	1
13	6	(Bulgaria)	Nikolay Bodurov	1	0	0	1
13	12	(France)	Seko Fofana	1	0	0	1
13	18	(England)	Michael Turner	1	0	0	1
13	32	(Republic of Ireland)	Sean Kavanagh	1	0	0	1
#	Own Goals			1	0	0	1
TOTALS				62	5	4	71

=== Disciplinary record ===
Includes all competitive matches. The list is sorted by shirt number.

N	P	Nat.	Name	Championship			League Cup			FA Cup			Total			Notes
N	P	Nat.	Name	Yellow card	Second yellow card	Red card	Yellow card	Second yellow card	Red card	Yellow card	Second yellow card	Red card	Yellow card	Second yellow card	Red card	Notes
2	DF	(Germany)	Tim Hoogland	5									5			
3	DF	(Greece)	Kostas Stafylidis	5	1								5	1		
4	DF	(England)	Shaun Hutchinson	2		2				1			3		2	
6	DF	(Bulgaria)	Nikolay Bodurov	4			1			1			6			
8	MF	(England)	Scott Parker	5						1			6			
9	FW	(England)	Matt Smith	1		1							1		1	
11	MF	(Sweden)	Alexander Kačaniklić	2									2			
12	MF	(France)	Seko Fofana	4						1			5			
13	MF	(England)	Danny Guthrie	3									3			
15	DF	(Switzerland)	Kay Voser	1			1						2			
16	FW	(England)	Cauley Woodrow							2			2			
18	FW	(England)	Michael Turner	3									3			
19	MF	(England)	Ryan Tunnicliffe	3									3			
21	MF	(Denmark)	Lasse Vigen Christensen	2									2			
27	FW	(Wales)	George Williams	1									1			
28	MF	(United States)	Emerson Hyndman	1									1			
29	DF	(Wales)	Jazz Richards	2									2			
32	DF	(Republic of Ireland)	Sean Kavanagh	4									4			
33	DF	(England)	Dan Burn	7			1						8			
37	DF	(Scotland)	Jack Grimmer	2									2			
40	GK	(England)	Marcus Bettinelli	2		1	1						3		1	
44	FW	(Scotland)	Ross McCormack	4	1					2			6	1		
Players who left the club during the season
13	DF	(Montenegro)	Elsad Zverotić	2									2			
26	MF	(Scotland)	Mark Fotheringham	2									2			
Out on loan
5	DF	(Venezuela)	Fernando Amorebieta	2		1							2		1	
TOTALS				69	2	5	4	0	0	8	0	0	81	2	5	

Last updated: 2 May 2015
Source: Football League
Ordered by (red card) , (second yellow card) and (yellow card)
(yellow card) = Number of bookings; (second yellow card) = Number of sending offs after a second yellow card; (red card) = Number of sending offs by a direct red card.

==== Suspensions ====
Player	Date Received	Offence	Length of suspension	
Matt Smith	13 September 2014	(red card) vs Reading	3 Matches	Nottingham Forest (A), Blackburn Rovers (H) (Championship), Doncaster Rovers (H) (Football League Cup)
Shaun Hutchinson	20 September 2014	(red card) vs Blackburn	3 Matches	Doncaster Rovers (H) (Football League Cup), Birmingham City (A), Bolton Wanderers (H) (Championship)
Ross McCormack	1 November 2014	(yellow card) (yellow-red card) vs Wigan	1 Match	Blackpool (H) (Championship)
Dan Burn	21 November 2014	5 (yellow card) in all competitions	1 Match	Brighton & Hove Albion (A) (Championship)
Marcus Bettinelli	5 December 2014	(red card) vs Watford	1 Match	Leeds United (A) (Championship)
Fernando Amorebieta	6 March 2015	(red card) vs AFC Bournemouth	3 Matches	Sheffield Wednesday (A), Leeds United (H), Huddersfield Town (A) (Championship)
Kostas Stafylidis	18 March 2015	(yellow card) (yellow-red card) vs Leeds United	1 Match	Huddersfield Town (A) (Championship)
Shaun Hutchinson	21 March 2015	(red card) vs Huddersfield Town	2 Matches	Brentford (H), Charlton Athletic (A) (Championship)

Last updated: 2 May 2015.
Source: Football Association
