= Seán Kavanagh =

Irish footballer

Personal information
- Full name: Seán Kavanagh
- Date of birth: 20 January 1994 (age 32)
- Place of birth: Dublin, Ireland
- Height: 1.74 m (5 ft 9 in)
- Position: Defender

Youth career
- –2011: Belvedere

Senior career*
Years	Team	Apps	(Gls)
2011–2018	Fulham	21	(1)
2016	→ Mansfield Town (loan)	7	(0)
2017	→ Hartlepool United (loan)	9	(0)
2018–2025	Shamrock Rovers	134	(5)
Total		171	(6)

International career
2014–2016	Republic of Ireland U21	11	(2)
- * Club domestic league appearances and goals

Seán Kavanagh (born 20 January 1994) is an Irish football coach and former player who played as a left back for Fulham, Mansfield Town, Hartlepool United and Shamrock Rovers.

== Career ==
=== Fulham ===
Born in Dublin, Ireland, Kavanagh started his youth career at Belvedere before joining Fulham in 2011. While making his progress at the club's academy, Kavanagh struggled with injuries, but managed to regain his fitness.

After progressing the club's academy for the past three years, Kavanagh made his first team debut for Fulham in a 1–0 home loss on 20 August 2014 against Wolverhampton Wanderers at Craven Cottage. After the match, Kavanagh told the club's website that his debut for Fulham was a proud moment.

Kavanagh scored his first goal for the club in the 1–0 win over Norwich City. However, Kavanagh's season was later interrupted when he suffered injuries twice during the season: once with a thigh injury in November and another with a knee injury in January. Despite this, Kavanagh played a role when he provided assist for Ross McCormack and then provided another assist for Matt Smith, in a 1–0 win over Blackpool.

After a handful of first team appearances, he signed a contract extension with the club, keeping him until 2018. Though playing in midfield under the management of Kit Symons, Kavanagh made nineteen appearances and scoring once for the 2014–15 season.

In the 2015–16 season, Kavanagh struggled to be in the first team, having spent most of the time being on the substitute bench and was limited even further following the arrivals of James Husband and Luke Garbutt. On 21 November 2015, Kavanagh made his first appearance of the season, playing 90 minutes, in a 1–1 draw against MK Dons. He made another appearance in the next game against Preston North End. Kavanagh went on to make seven appearances for the club before returning to his parent club in May 2016.

In the 2016–17 season, Kavanagh featured twice for Fulham, both coming from the EFL Cup. After being told by the club that he would be loaned out, he joined League Two side Hartlepool United until the end of the season. He made his Hartlepool United debut, where he started the whole game, in a 1–0 loss against Grimsby Town on 7 January 2017. Kavanagh then quickly established himself in the starting eleven, playing in the left-back position. However, he suffered injuries that kept him out on two occasions. As a result, his loan spell at Hartlepool United ended on 7 April 2017. His last appearance for Hartlepool United came on 4 March 2017, where he played 39 minutes, in a 3–1 win over Exeter City.

=== Shamrock Rovers ===
After appearing once for Fulham in the 2017–18 season, Kavanagh returned to Republic of Ireland, where he joined Shamrock Rovers for an undisclosed fee. Kavanagh had been set to join Derry City but joined Shamrock Rovers at the last moment. He also said that he took 'unbelievable' pay cut to join the club, saying: "the football here will suit me rather than trying to hang around the lower leagues in England."

Kavanagh made his Shamrock Rovers' debut, starting the whole game, in a 0–0 draw against Dundalk in the opening game of the 2018 League of Ireland Premier Division season. In the next two matches, he scored two goals in two matches, which both matches were a win against Bray Wanderers and Derry City. Since making his debut, Kavanagh quickly established himself in the starting eleven for the side. However, he was sent-off in the 84th minutes for a foul on Billy Dennehy, in a 1–0 win over Limerick. After serving a one match ban, he returned to the first team from suspension, playing 90 minutes, in a 1–0 win over Sligo Rovers on 30 March 2018.

On 7 January 2026, it was announced that Kavaagh had joined the coaching staff at Shamrock Rovers, after retiring from playing at the end of the 2025 season.

== International career ==
Kavanagh has represented Republic of Ireland's U16, U17 and U19 before representing U21.

At the U21 side, Kavanagh was called up for the first time in September 2014. He made his Republic of Ireland U21 debut, where he came on as a substitute in the second-half, in a 4–1 loss against Norway U21 on 9 October 2014. It wasn't until on 4 September 2015 when he scored his first goals, in a 4–1 win over Qatar U23. However, in a 3–1 loss against Lithuania U21 on 13 November 2015, Kavanagh was sent-off in the closing stage of the game for a foul on Deimantas Petravičius. Despite serving a three match suspension, he went on to make 11 appearances and scoring 2 times for the U21 side.

== Personal life ==
Growing up in Dublin, Ireland, Kavanagh grew up supporting Liverpool and idolized full-back John Arne Riise, who was at Fulham when Kavanagh was at the club's academy. Riise left the club, months before Kavanagh made his Fulham debut.

== Career statistics ==
Appearances and goals by club, season and competition
Club	Season	League			National cup		League cup		Europe		Other		Total	
Club	Season	Division	Apps	Goals	Apps	Goals	Apps	Goals	Apps	Goals	Apps	Goals	Apps	Goals
Fulham	2014–15	Championship	19	1	2	0	2	0	—		—		23	1
Fulham	2015–16	Championship	2	0	0	0	0	0	—		—		2	0
Fulham	2016–17	Championship	0	0	0	0	2	0	—		—		2	0
Fulham	Total		21	1	2	0	4	0	—		—		27	1
Mansfield Town (loan)	2015–16	League Two	7	0	0	0	0	0	—		0	0	7	0
Hartlepool United (loan)	2016–17	League Two	9	0	0	0	—		—		0	0	9	0
Shamrock Rovers	2018	LOI Premier Division	30	2	1	0	0	0	2	0	0	0	33	2
Shamrock Rovers	2019	LOI Premier Division	27	3	5	1	1	0	4	0	0	0	37	4
Shamrock Rovers	2020	LOI Premier Division	7	0	3	0	—		1	0	—		11	0
Shamrock Rovers	2021	LOI Premier Division	11	0	1	0	—		1	0	0	0	13	0
Shamrock Rovers	2022	LOI Premier Division	19	0	2	0	—		6	0	0	0	27	0
Shamrock Rovers	2023	LOI Premier Division	18	0	1	0	—		3	0	1	0	23	0
Shamrock Rovers	2024	LOI Premier Division	12	0	1	0	—		1	0	1	0	15	0
Shamrock Rovers	2025	LOI Premier Division	5	0	3	0	—		1	0	0	0	9	0
Shamrock Rovers	Total		129	5	17	1	1	0	19	0	2	0	168	6
Shamrock Rovers II (loan)	2020	LOI First Division	2	0	—		—		—		—		2	0
Career total			168	6	19	1	5	0	19	0	2	0	213	7

== Honours ==
Shamrock Rovers

- League of Ireland Premier Division: 2020, 2021, 2022, 2023
- FAI Cup: 2019
- President of Ireland's Cup: 2022, 2024
