= 2013–14 Fulham F.C. season =

Fulham
2013–14 season
- Chairman: Shahid Khan
- Manager: Martin Jol (until 1 December 2013); René Meulensteen (until 14 February 2014); Felix Magath (from 14 February 2014)
- Stadium: Craven Cottage
- Premier League: 19th (relegated)
- FA Cup: Fourth round (lost to Sheffield United)
- League Cup: Fourth round (lost to Leicester City)
- Top goalscorer: League: Steve Sidwell (7); All: Steve Sidwell (8)
- Highest home attendance: 25,700 (2 November vs Manchester United, Premier League) (1 February vs Southampton, Premier League) (26 April vs Hull City, Premier League)
- Lowest home attendance: 10,139 (4 February vs Sheffield United, FA Cup, Fourth round replay)
- Average home league attendance: 24,977
Home colours	Away colours	Third colours

The 2013–14 season was Fulham's 116th professional season and their 13th consecutive season in the top flight of English football, the Premier League. They also competed in the League Cup and the FA Cup. Fulham were relegated from the Premier League, finishing in 19th place. They also exited the League Cup in the fourth round and the FA Cup in the fourth round.

== Transfers ==
=== In ===
Date	Pos.	Name	From	Fee	Source
16 May 2013	RB	Sascha Riether (GER)	1. FC Köln (GER)	£1,300,000	
22 May 2013	CB	Fernando Amorebieta (VEN)	Athletic Bilbao (ESP)	Free	
22 May 2013	CM	Derek Boateng (GHA)	Dnipro Dnipopetrovsk (UKR)	Free	
4 June 2013	GK	Maarten Stekelenburg (NED)	Roma (ITA)	£4,000,000	
4 June 2013	MF	Ange-Freddy Plumain (FRA)	Lens (FRA)	Free	
19 August 2013	MF	Scott Parker (ENG)	Tottenham Hotspur (ENG)	£3,500,000	
1 September 2013	DF	Elsad Zverotić (MNE)	Young Boys (SWI)	Undisclosed	
31 January 2014	MF	Ryan Tunnicliffe (ENG)	Manchester United (ENG)	Undisclosed	
31 January 2014	MF	Larnell Cole (ENG)	Manchester United (ENG)	Undisclosed	
31 January 2014	DF	John Heitinga (NED)	Everton (ENG)	Free	
31 January 2014	FW	Konstantinos Mitroglou (GRE)	Olympiacos (GRE)	£11,000,000	
27 February 2012	MF	Mahamadou Diarra (MLI)		Free transfer	

=== Loans in ===
Date	Pos.	Name	From	Length	Source
7 August 2013	MF	Adel Taarabt (MAR)	Queens Park Rangers (ENG)	End of season (recalled on 30 January 2014)	
16 August 2013	ST	Darren Bent (ENG)	Aston Villa (ENG)	End of season	
24 December 2013	MF	Clint Dempsey (USA)	Seattle Sounders FC (USA)	3 March 2014	
30 January 2014	MF	William Kvist (DEN)	VfB Stuttgart (GER)	End of season	
31 January 2014	MF	Lewis Holtby (GER)	Tottenham Hotspur (ENG)	End of season	

=== Out ===
Date	Pos.	Name	To	Fee	Source
1 July 2013	GK	Mark Schwarzer (AUS)	Chelsea (ENG)	Released	
1 July 2013	DF	Chris Baird (NIR)	Reading (ENG)	Released	
1 July 2013	FW	Mladen Petrić (CRO)	West Ham United (ENG)	Released	
1 July 2013	MF	Simon Davies (WAL)	Solva (WAL)	Released	
1 July 2013	GK	Csaba Somogyi (HUN)		Released	
1 July 2013	DF	Alex Smith (ENG)	Swindon Town (ENG)	Released	
1 July 2013	FW	James Musa (NZL)	Released	Released	
1 July 2013	MF	Tom Donegan (ENG)	Released	Released	
1 July 2013	FW	Corey Gameiro (AUS)	Sydney FC (AUS)	Released	
1 July 2013	FW	Richard Peniket (WAL)	Tamworth (ENG)	Released	
6 September 2013	MF	Kerim Frei (TUR)	Beşiktaş (TUR)	€3,150,000	
31 January 2014	DF	Philippe Senderos (SWI)	Valencia (ESP)	Undisclosed	
31 January 2014	DF	Aaron Hughes (NIR)	Queens Park Rangers (ENG)	Free transfer	

=== Loans out ===
Date	Pos.	Name	To	Length	Source
3 July 2013	DF	Dan Burn (ENG)	Birmingham City (ENG)	End of season (recalled on 2 January 2014)	
3 August 2013	MF	Ryan Williams (AUS)	Oxford United (ENG)	End of season	
28 August 2013	GK	Marcus Bettinelli (ENG)	Accrington Stanley (ENG)	26 December 2013	
2 September 2013	FW	Cauley Woodrow (ENG)	Southend United (ENG)	End of season	
2 September 2013	FW	Marcello Trotta (ITA)	Brentford (ENG)	End of season	
22 November 2013	GK	Neil Etheridge (PHI)	Crewe Alexandra (ENG)	1 January 2014	
28 November 2013	MF	Mesca (GNB)	Crewe Alexandra (ENG)	7 January 2014	
3 January 2014	GK	Marcus Bettinelli (ENG)	Accrington Stanley (ENG)	End of season	
15 January 2014	FW	Bryan Ruiz (CRC)	PSV (NED)	End of season	
31 January 2014	FW	Dimitar Berbatov (BUL)	Monaco (MON)	End of season	
25 February 2014	GK	Neil Etheridge (PHI)	Crewe Alexandra (ENG)	13 April 2014 (recalled on 4 April 2014)	
25 February 2014	MF	Ryan Tunnicliffe (ENG)	Wigan Athletic (ENG)	End of season	
25 February 2014	MF	Larnell Cole (ENG)	Milton Keynes Dons (ENG)	End of season	

=== Overall transfer activity ===
For the purposes of this totaliser, Frei's fee has been converted into pounds and rounded to two significant figures.

==== Spending ====
Summer: ▼£8,800,000

Winter: ▼£11,000,000

Total: ▼£19,800,000

==== Income ====
Summer: £0

Winter: ▲£2,500,000

Total: ▲£2,500,000

==== Total ====
Summer: ▼£8,800,000

Winter: ▼£8,500,000

Grand Total: ▼£17,300,000

== Fixtures and results ==
=== Pre-season ===
14 July 2013	Cartaginés	0–3	Fulham	Estadio Nacional de Costa Rica
16:00 (CST)		Report	Berbatov 35', 40' (pen.); Ruiz 73'	Attendance: 11,000; Referee: Ricardo Cerdas

17 July 2013	Alajuelense	1–3	Fulham	Estadio Nacional de Costa Rica
18:00 (CST)	Guevara 72'	Report	Sidwell 62'; Berbatov 79' (pen.); Ruiz 87'	Attendance: 7,000

20 July 2013	Deportivo Saprissa	2–2 (3–5 p)	Fulham	Estadio Nacional de Costa Rica
03:00 (BST)	Ramírez 26'; Estrada 69'	Report	Ruiz 29'; Rodallega 39'
	Penalties
	Russell (penalty scored); Vega (penalty scored); Rodríguez (penalty missed); Smith (penalty scored)		Karagounis (penalty scored); Ruiz (penalty scored); Riether (penalty scored); Dejagah (penalty scored); Rodallega (penalty scored)

28 July 2013	Werder Bremen	1–0	Fulham	Weserstadion
15:00	Petersen 55'	Report		Attendance: 20,021

5 August 2013	Fulham	1–1	Real Betis	Craven Cottage
20:00	Sidwell 13'		Nosa 55'	Attendance: 9,451

10 August 2013	Fulham	1–2	Parma	Craven Cottage
15:00	Sidwell 10'		Paletta 56'; Sansone 86'	Attendance: 9,786

=== Premier League ===
17 August 2013 1	Sunderland	0–1	Fulham	Sunderland
15:00 BST		Report	Boateng (yellow card) 23'; Kasami 52'; Berbatov (yellow card) 85'; Duff (yellow card) 90+3'	Stadium: Stadium of Light; Attendance: 43,905; Referee: Neil Swarbrick

24 August 2013 2	Fulham	1–3	Arsenal	London
12:45 BST	Parker (yellow card) 73'; Bent 77'; Kasami (yellow card) 78'	Report	Giroud 14'; Ramsey (yellow card) 21'; Podolski 41', 68'; Wilshere (yellow card) 80'	Stadium: Craven Cottage; Attendance: 25,622; Referee: Howard Webb

31 August 2013 3	Newcastle United	1–0	Fulham	Newcastle
15:00 BST	Ben Arfa 86', (yellow card) 87'; Cabaye (yellow card) 82'	Report	Kačaniklić (yellow card) 45'; Riise (yellow card) 76'	Stadium: St James' Park; Attendance: 46,402; Referee: Chris Foy

14 September 2013 4	Fulham	1–1	West Bromwich Albion	London
15:00 BST	Sidwell 22'	Report	Jones (yellow card) 70'; McAuley 90+2'	Stadium: Craven Cottage; Attendance: 25,560; Referee: Lee Probert

21 September 2013 5	Chelsea	2–0	Fulham	London
17:30 BST	Oscar 52'; Mikel 84'	Report		Stadium: Stamford Bridge; Attendance: 41,608; Referee: Andre Marriner

28 September 2013 6	Fulham	1–2	Cardiff City	London
15:00 BST	Ruiz 45'; Berbatov (yellow card) 64'	Report	Caulker 12'; Théophile-Catherine (yellow card) 32'; Mutch 90+2'	Stadium: Craven Cottage; Attendance: 23,020; Referee: Craig Pawson

5 October 2013 7	Fulham	1–0	Stoke City	London
15:00 BST	Amorebieta (yellow card) 28'; Richardson (yellow card) 74'; Bent 83'; Senderos (yellow card) 90+3'	Report	Whelan (yellow card) 60'; Walters (yellow card) 74'	Stadium: Craven Cottage; Attendance: 24,634; Referee: Roger East

21 October 2013 8	Crystal Palace	1–4	Fulham	London
20:00 BST	Mariappa 7'	Report	Kasami 19'; Sidwell 45'; Berbatov 50'; Senderos 55'; Richardson (yellow card) 81'	Stadium: Selhurst Park; Attendance: 24,881; Referee: Lee Mason

26 October 2013 9	Southampton	2–0	Fulham	Southampton
17:30 BST	Lambert 20'; Rodriguez 42'	Report	Sidwell (yellow card) 88'; Hughes (yellow card) 90+1'	Stadium: St Mary's Stadium; Attendance: 28,631; Referee: Andre Marriner

2 November 2013 10	Fulham	1–3	Manchester United	London
15:00 GMT	Dejagah (yellow card) 33'; Amorebieta (yellow card) 58'; Kačaniklić 65'	Report	Valencia 9', (yellow card) 51'; Van Persie 20'; Rooney 22'	Stadium: Craven Cottage; Attendance: 25,700; Referee: Lee Probert

9 November 2013 11	Liverpool	4–0	Fulham	Liverpool
15:00 GMT	Amorebieta 23' (o.g.); Škrtel 26'; Suárez 36', 54'	Report	Parker (yellow card) 24'	Stadium: Anfield; Attendance: 44,768; Referee: Mike Jones

23 November 2013 12	Fulham	1–2	Swansea City	London
15:00 GMT	Boateng (yellow card) 19'; Kasami (yellow card) 30'; Parker 64'	Report	Hughes 56' (o.g.), (yellow card) 62'; Davies (yellow card) 72'; Shelvey 80'	Stadium: Craven Cottage; Attendance: 25,258; Referee: Andre Marriner

30 November 2013 13	West Ham United	3–0	Fulham	London
15:00 GMT	Tomkins (yellow card) 11'; McCartney (yellow card) 27'; Diamé (yellow card) 45+2', (goal) 47'; C. Cole 82'; J. Cole 88'	Report	Richardson (yellow card) 8'; Sidwell (yellow card) 21'	Stadium: Boleyn Ground; Attendance: 34,946; Referee: Martin Atkinson

4 December 2013 14	Fulham	1–2	Tottenham Hotspur	London
20:00 GMT	Kasami (yellow card) 32'; Dejagah 56'; Senderos (yellow card) 90+1'	Report	Capoue (yellow card) 13'; Chiricheș 73'; Holtby 82'	Stadium: Craven Cottage; Attendance: 24,128; Referee: Mark Clattenburg

8 December 2013 15	Fulham	2–0	Aston Villa	London
13:30 GMT	Sidwell 21'; Berbatov 30' (pen.)	Report	Delph (yellow card) 19'; Herd (yellow card) 67'	Stadium: Craven Cottage; Attendance: 22,288; Referee: Mike Dean

14 December 2013 16	Everton	4–1	Fulham	Liverpool
15:00 GMT	Osman 18'; Coleman 73'; Pienaar (yellow card) 74'; Barry 84'; Mirallas 90+1'	Report	Berbatov 67' (pen.); Dejagah (yellow card) 70'; Senderos (yellow card) 90'	Stadium: Goodison Park; Attendance: 33,796; Referee: Anthony Taylor

21 December 2013 17	Fulham	2–4	Manchester City	London
15:00 GMT	Richardson 50'; Kompany 69' (o.g.)	Report	Touré 23'; Kompany 43'; Navas 78'; Milner 83'	Stadium: Craven Cottage; Attendance: 25,509; Referee: Kevin Friend

26 December 2013 18	Norwich City	1–2	Fulham	Norwich
15:00 GMT	Hooper 13'; Turner (yellow card) 49'; Fer (yellow card) 59'; Redmond (yellow card) 82'	Report	Kasami 33'; Parker 87'	Stadium: Carrow Road; Attendance: 26,811; Referee: Jonathan Moss

28 December 2013 19	Hull City	6–0	Fulham	Kingston upon Hull
15:00 GMT	Elmohamady 49'; Koren 60', 84'; Boyd 60'; Huddlestone 67'; Fryatt 74'	Report		Stadium: KC Stadium; Attendance: 23,925; Referee: Robert Madley

1 January 2014 20	Fulham	2–1	West Ham United	London
15:00 GMT	Sidwell 32'; Berbatov 66', (yellow card) 70'; Amorebieta (yellow card) 76'	Report	Diamé 6'; Nolan (red card) 44'; Raț (yellow card) 63'	Stadium: Craven Cottage; Attendance: 25,335; Referee: Mark Clattenburg

11 January 2014 21	Fulham	1–4	Sunderland	London
15:00 GMT	Sidwell (yellow card) 37', (goal) 52'; Riise (yellow card) 40'; Parker (yellow card) 60'	Report	Johnson 29', 69', 85' (pen.); Bardsley (yellow card) 30'; Ki 41'; Colback (yellow card) 58'; Johnson (yellow card) 71'	Stadium: Craven Cottage; Attendance: 25,564; Referee: Mike Dean

18 January 2014 22	Arsenal	2–0	Fulham	London
15:00 GMT	Carzola 57', 62'	Report		Stadium: Emirates Stadium; Attendance: 60,000; Referee: Lee Probert

28 January 2014 23	Swansea City	2–0	Fulham	Swansea
19:45 GMT	Shelvey 61'; Berbatov 75' (o.g.); Bony (yellow card) 90+1'	Report	Richardson (yellow card) 75'	Stadium: Liberty Stadium; Attendance: 20,004; Referee: Michael Oliver

1 February 2014 24	Fulham	0–3	Southampton	London
15:00 GMT		Report	Rodriguez (yellow card) 16', (goal) 75'; Wanyama (yellow card) 26'; Schneiderlin (yellow card) 36'; Lallana 64'; Lambert 70'	Stadium: Craven Cottage; Attendance: 25,700; Referee: Michael Jones

9 February 2014 25	Manchester United	2–2	Fulham	Manchester
16:00 GMT	Van Persie 78'; Carrick 80'	Report	Sidwell 19'; Bent 90+4'	Stadium: Old Trafford; Attendance: 74,966; Referee: Kevin Friend

12 February 2014 26	Fulham	2–3	Liverpool	London
20:00 GMT	Touré 8' (o.g.); Richardson 63', (yellow card) 64'; Kvist (yellow card) 9'; Riether (yellow card) 50'; Heitinga (yellow card) 90+1'	Report	Sturridge 41'; Coutinho (yellow card) 56', (goal) 72'; Henderson (yellow card) 77'; Gerrard 90+1' (pen.), (yellow card) 90+2'	Stadium: Craven Cottage; Attendance: 25,375; Referee: Phil Dowd

22 February 2014 27	West Bromwich Albion	1–1	Fulham	West Bromwich
15:00 GMT	Brunt (yellow card) 45+1'; McAuley (yellow card) 75'; Vydra 86'; Olsson (yellow card) 90+1'	Report	Dejagah 28'; Heitinga (yellow card) 45+3'; Riether (yellow card) 72'; Parker (yellow card) 86'	Stadium: The Hawthorns; Attendance: 25,782; Referee: Mike Dean

1 March 2014 28	Fulham	1–3	Chelsea	London
15:00 GMT	Dejagah (yellow card) 35'; Kasami (yellow card) 48'; Heitinga 74'	Report	Ramires (yellow card) 50'; Schürrle 52', 65', 68'	Stadium: Craven Cottage; Attendance: 24,577; Referee: Mark Clattenburg

8 March 2014 29	Cardiff City	3–1	Fulham	Cardiff
15:00 GMT	Caulker 45', 67'; Kim (yellow card) 12'; Riether 71' (o.g.)	Report	Holtby 59'	Stadium: Cardiff City Stadium; Attendance: 26,796; Referee: Martin Atkinson

15 March 2014 30	Fulham	1–0	Newcastle United	London
15:00 GMT	Dejagah 68', (yellow card) 68'	Report		Stadium: Craven Cottage; Attendance: 25,664; Referee: Howard Webb

22 March 2014 31	Manchester City	5–0	Fulham	Manchester
15:00 GMT	Touré 26' (pen.), 54' (pen.), 65'; Fernandinho 84'; Demichelis 88'	Report	Amorebieta (yellow card) 25' (red card) 53'; Sidwell (yellow card) 64'; Roberts (yellow card) 65'; Holtby (yellow card) 90+2'	Stadium: Etihad Stadium; Attendance: 47,262; Referee: Jonathan Moss

30 March 2014 32	Fulham	1–3	Everton	London
13:30 BST	Riether (yellow card) 23'; Dejagah 71'	Report	Coleman (yellow card) 31'; Stockdale 50' (o.g.); Baines (yellow card) 75'; Mirallas 79'; Naismith 87'	Stadium: Craven Cottage; Attendance: 25,454; Referee: Anthony Taylor

5 April 2014 33	Aston Villa	1–2	Fulham	Birmingham
15:00 BST	Bennett (yellow card) 59'; Westwood (yellow card) 67'; Holt 70'; Albrighton (yellow card) 90'	Report	Richardson 61'; Sidwell (yellow card) 84'; Rodallega 86'; Holtby (yellow card) 87'	Stadium: Villa Park; Attendance: 33,532; Referee: Michael Oliver

12 April 2014 34	Fulham	1–0	Norwich City	London
15:07 BST	Rodallega 40'; Kasami (yellow card) 45+1'	Report	Fer (yellow card) 32'; Whittaker (yellow card) 39'; Snodgrass (yellow card) 90+1'	Stadium: Craven Cottage; Attendance: 25,028; Referee: Mike Dean

19 April 2014 35	Tottenham Hotspur	3–1	Fulham	London
12:45 BST	Paulinho 35'; Kane 48'; Kaboul 62'	Report	Sidwell 37'; Heitinga (yellow card) 61'	Stadium: White Hart Lane; Attendance: 35,841; Referee: Lee Probert

26 April 2014 36	Fulham	2–2	Hull City	London
15:00 BST	Dejagah 55'; Amorebieta 58'; Diarra (yellow card) 65'	Report	Elmohamady (yellow card) 16'; Jelavić (yellow card) 21', (goal) 75'; Livermore (yellow card) 45'; Long 87'	Stadium: Craven Cottage; Attendance: 25,700; Referee: Lee Mason

3 May 2014 37	Stoke City	4–1	Fulham	Stoke-on-Trent
15:00 BST	Odemwingie 39'; Arnautović 54'; Assaidi 73'; Walters 82'	Report	Parker (yellow card) 65'; Dejagah (yellow card) 75'; Richardson 80'	Stadium: Britannia Stadium; Attendance: 27,429; Referee: Chris Foy

11 May 2014 38	Fulham	2–2	Crystal Palace	London
15:00 BST	Amorebieta (yellow card) 58'; Woodrow 61'; Parker (yellow card) 83'; David 90+4', (yellow card) 90+4'	Report	Chamakh (yellow card) 12'; Gayle 28', 83', (yellow card) 84'	Stadium: Craven Cottage; Attendance: 24,447; Referee: Kevin Friend

=== Football League Cup ===
27 August 2013 2nd round	Burton Albion	2–2 (a.e.t.) (4–5 p)	Fulham	Burton upon Trent
19:45 BST	Dyer (yellow card) 66', (goal) 85'; Palmer (yellow card) 88'; Symes (yellow card) 90', (goal) 102'; Phillips (yellow card) 96'	Report	Taarabt 36'; Rodallega (yellow card) 107', (goal) 117'	Stadium: Pirelli Stadium; Attendance: 4,002; Referee: Andy Madley
	Penalties
	Symes (penalty scored); Reed (penalty scored); Dyer (penalty missed); McCrory (penalty scored); Hussey (penalty scored)		(penalty scored) Bent; (penalty scored) Ruiz; (penalty scored) Riether; (penalty scored) Rodallega; (penalty scored) Riise

24 September 2013 3rd round	Fulham	2–1	Everton	London
20:00 BST	Parker (yellow card) 16'; Berbatov 54'; Bent 68'	Report	Naismith 12'; Gibson (yellow card) 35'; Coleman (yellow card) 79'; McCarthy (yellow card) 84'; Stones (yellow card) 90+2'	Stadium: Craven Cottage; Attendance: 14,627; Referee: Martin Atkinson

29 October 2013 4th round	Leicester City	4–3	Fulham	Leicester
19:45 GMT	Morgan 41', (yellow card) 79'; Wood 45'; Miquel 53'; Dyer 89'; Vardy (yellow card) 90+2'	Report	Rodallega 18', 54'; Boateng (yellow card) 39'; Senderos (yellow card) 74'; Karagounis (yellow card) 76', (goal) 87'; Zverotić (yellow card) 88'	Stadium: King Power Stadium; Attendance: 17,932; Referee: Keith Stroud

=== FA Cup ===
4 January 2014 3rd round	Norwich City	1–1	Fulham	Norwich
15:00 GMT	Snodgrass 45'	Report	Bent 40'	Stadium: Carrow Road; Attendance: 21,703; Referee: Craig Pawson

14 January 2014 Replay	Fulham	3–0	Norwich City	London
19:45 GMT	Bent 16'; Dejagah 41'; Sidwell 68'; Karagounis (yellow card) 71'	Report		Stadium: Craven Cottage; Attendance: 11,172; Referee: Lee Mason

26 January 2014 4th round	Sheffield United	1–1	Fulham	Sheffield
13:00 GMT	Porter 31'; Doyle (red card) 51'	Report	Rodallega 75'; Passley (yellow card) 76'; Kasami (yellow card) 81'	Stadium: Bramall Lane; Attendance: 16,324; Referee: Andre Marriner

4 February 2014 Replay	Fulham	0–1 (a.e.t.)	Sheffield United	London
19:45 GMT	Amorebieta (yellow card) 82'; Sidwell (yellow card) 105+1'	Report	Harris (yellow card) 39'; Miller (yellow card) 101', (goal) 120'	Stadium: Craven Cottage; Attendance: 10,139; Referee: Neil Swarbrick

== Competitions ==
=== Overall ===
Competition	Started round	Current position / round	Final position / round	First match	Last match
Premier League	—	—	19th	17 August 2013	11 May 2014
League Cup	2nd round	—	4th round	27 August 2013	29 October 2013
FA Cup	3rd round	—	4th round	4 January 2014	4 February 2014

Updated to match played 11 May 2014
Source: Competitions

=== Premier League table ===
Pos	Team	Pld	W	D	L	GF	GA	GD	Pts	Qualification or relegation
16	Hull City	38	10	7	21	38	53	−15	37	Qualification for the Europa League third qualifying round (Note: Hull City qualified for the Europa League third qualifying round as runners-up of the 2013–14 FA Cup since winners Arsenal qualified for Champions League.)
17	West Bromwich Albion	38	7	15	16	43	59	−16	36	
18	Norwich City (R)	38	8	9	21	28	62	−34	33	Relegation to Football League Championship
19	Fulham (R)	38	9	5	24	40	85	−45	32	Relegation to Football League Championship
20	Cardiff City (R)	38	7	9	22	32	74	−42	30	Relegation to Football League Championship

Source: Barclays Premier League
Rules for classification: 1) Points; 2) Goal difference; 3) Goals scored; 4) Play-offs (only if needed to decide champion, teams for relegation or teams for UEFA competitions).
(R) Relegated

=== Results summary ===
Overall								Home						Away					
Pld	W	D	L	GF	GA	GD	Pts	W	D	L	GF	GA	GD	W	D	L	GF	GA	GD
38	9	5	24	40	85	−45	32	5	3	11	24	38	−14	4	2	13	16	47	−31

Last updated: 11 May 2014.
Source: BBC Sport

=== Results by matchday ===
Matchday	1	2	3	4	5	6	7	8	9	10	11	12	13	14	15	16	17	18	19	20	21	22	23	24	25	26	27	28	29	30	31	32	33	34	35	36	37	38
Ground	A	H	A	H	A	H	H	A	A	H	A	H	A	H	H	A	H	A	A	H	H	A	A	H	A	H	A	H	A	H	A	H	A	H	A	H	A	H
Result	W	L	L	D	L	L	W	W	L	L	L	L	L	L	W	L	L	W	L	W	L	L	L	L	D	L	D	L	L	W	L	L	W	W	L	D	L	D
Position	4	11	16	13	18	18	17	13	13	15	17	18	18	18	18	19	19	18	18	16	16	17	17	20	20	20	20	20	20	20	20	20	18	18	19	18	19	19

Updated to match(es) played on 11 May 2014. Source: Statto.com
A = Away; H = Home; W = Win; D = Draw; L = Loss

== Squad statistics ==
=== Appearances and goals ===
Last updated 11 May 2014

No.	Pos	Nat	Player	Total		Premier League		FA Cup		League Cup	
No.	Pos	Nat	Player	Apps	Goals	Apps	Goals	Apps	Goals	Apps	Goals
1	GK	(Netherlands) NED	Maarten Stekelenburg	21	0	19+0	0	1+0	0	1+0	0
3	DF	(Norway) NOR	John Arne Riise	25	0	17+3	0	1+1	0	3+0	0
4	DF	(Netherlands) NED	John Heitinga	14	1	14+0	1	0+0	0	0+0	0
5	DF	(Norway) NOR	Brede Hangeland	27	0	23+0	0	2+0	0	2+0	0
6	MF	(Denmark) DEN	William Kvist	8	0	7+1	0	0+0	0	0+0	0
7	MF	(England) ENG	Steve Sidwell	41	8	36+2	7	1+1	1	0+1	0
8	MF	(Switzerland) SUI	Pajtim Kasami	35	3	20+9	3	4+0	0	1+1	0
9	MF	(Mali) MLI	Mahamadou Diarra	4	0	4+0	0	0+0	0	0+0	0
10	MF	(Germany) GER	Lewis Holtby	13	1	11+2	1	0+0	0	0+0	0
11	MF	(Sweden) SWE	Alexander Kačaniklić	29	1	15+8	1	3+0	0	2+1	0
13	GK	(England) ENG	David Stockdale	26	0	19+2	0	3+0	0	2+0	0
14	MF	(Greece) GRE	Giorgos Karagounis	19	1	6+8	0	2+0	0	3+0	1
15	DF	(England) ENG	Kieran Richardson	32	4	28+3	4	1+0	0	0+0	0
16	MF	(Republic of Ireland) IRL	Damien Duff	18	0	9+6	0	1+1	0	1+0	0
17	DF	(England) ENG	Matthew Briggs	2	0	0+2	0	0+0	0	0+0	0
18	FW	(Greece) GRE	Konstantinos Mitroglou	3	0	1+2	0	0+0	0	0+0	0
19	MF	(England) ENG	Ryan Tunnicliffe	3	0	2+1	0	0+0	0	0+0	0
20	FW	(Colombia) COL	Hugo Rodallega	17	6	6+7	3	2+0	0	1+1	3
21	MF	(England) ENG	Larnell Cole	1	0	0+1	0	0+0	0	0+0	0
22	DF	(Montenegro) MNE	Elsad Zverotić	9	0	5+1	0	1+0	0	2+0	0
23	MF	(Ghana) GHA	Derek Boateng	5	0	2+1	0	1+0	0	1+0	0
24	MF	(Iran) IRI	Ashkan Dejagah	25	6	13+9	5	1+1	1	1+0	0
25	FW	(England) ENG	Cauley Woodrow	6	1	5+1	1	0+0	0	0+0	0
26	FW	(England) ENG	Patrick Roberts	2	0	0+2	0	0+0	0	0+0	0
27	DF	(Germany) GER	Sascha Riether	33	0	30+1	0	1+0	0	1+0	0
28	MF	(England) ENG	Scott Parker	32	2	27+2	2	1+0	0	2+0	0
30	FW	(Netherlands) NED	Chris David	3	1	0+1	1	2+0	0	0+0	0
32	MF	(United States) USA	Clint Dempsey	7	0	4+1	0	2+0	0	0+0	0
33	DF	(England) ENG	Dan Burn	12	0	6+3	0	3+0	0	0+0	0
34	MF	(France) FRA	Ange-Freddy Plumain	2	0	0+0	0	0+2	0	0+0	0
35	DF	(Venezuela) VEN	Fernando Amorebieta	26	1	20+3	1	2+0	0	0+1	0
36	MF	(Portugal) POR	Mesca	1	0	0+1	0	0+0	0	0+0	0
37	MF	(Denmark) DEN	Lasse Vigen Christensen	2	0	0+0	0	0+2	0	0+0	0
38	GK	(Philippines) PHI	Neil Etheridge	0	0	0+0	0	0+0	0	0+0	0
39	FW	(England) ENG	Darren Bent	29	6	11+13	3	2+0	2	1+2	1
43	FW	(Sweden) SWE	Muamer Tanković	6	0	1+2	0	2+1	0	0+0	0
45	FW	(France) FRA	Moussa Dembélé	3	0	1+1	0	0+1	0	0+0	0
46	DF	(England) ENG	Josh Passley	2	0	0+0	0	2+0	0	0+0	0
Out on loan
9	FW	(Bulgaria) BUL	Dimitar Berbatov	19	5	18+0	4	0+0	0	1+0	1
10	FW	(Costa Rica) CRC	Bryan Ruiz	14	1	8+4	1	0+0	0	1+1	0
Left Permanently
4	DF	(Switzerland) SUI	Philippe Senderos	15	1	12+0	1	1+0	0	2+0	0
18	DF	(Northern Ireland) NIR	Aaron Hughes	17	0	11+2	0	2+0	0	2+0	0
19	MF	(Morocco) MAR	Adel Taarabt	16	1	7+5	0	0+1	0	3+0	1

=== Top scorers ===
Includes all competitive matches. The list is sorted by squad number when total goals are equal.

Last updated on 11 May 2014

Rank	No.	Player	Premier League	League Cup	FA Cup	Total
1	7	(England) Steve Sidwell	7	0	1	8
2	39	(England) Darren Bent	3	1	2	6
2	20	(Colombia) Hugo Rodallega	2	3	1	6
2	24	(Iran) Ashkan Dejagah	5	0	1	6
5	9	(Bulgaria) Dimitar Berbatov	4	1	0	5
6	15	(England) Kieran Richardson	4	0	0	4
7	8	(Switzerland) Pajtim Kasami	3	0	0	3
8	28	(England) Scott Parker	2	0	0	2
9	4	(Switzerland) Philippe Senderos	1	0	0	1
9	10	(Costa Rica) Bryan Ruiz	1	0	0	1
9	11	(Sweden) Alexander Kačaniklić	1	0	0	1
9	14	(Greece) Giorgos Karagounis	0	1	0	1
9	19	(Morocco) Adel Taarabt	0	1	0	1
9	4	(Netherlands) John Heitinga	1	0	0	1
9	10	(Germany) Lewis Holtby	1	0	0	1
9	35	(Venezuela) Fernando Amorebieta	1	0	0	1
9	25	(England) Cauley Woodrow	1	0	0	1
9	30	(Netherlands) Chris David	1	0	0	1
#	Own Goals		2	0	0	2
TOTALS			40	7	5	52

=== Disciplinary record ===
Includes all competitive matches. The list is sorted by shirt number.

N	P	Nat.	Name	Premier League			League Cup			FA Cup			Total			Notes
N	P	Nat.	Name	Yellow card	Second yellow card	Red card	Yellow card	Second yellow card	Red card	Yellow card	Second yellow card	Red card	Yellow card	Second yellow card	Red card	Notes
3	DF	(Norway)	John Arne Riise	2						1			3			
4	DF	(Switzerland)	Philippe Senderos	3			1						4			
4	DF	(Netherlands)	John Heitinga	3									3			
7	MF	(England)	Steve Sidwell	5						1			6			
8	MF	(Switzerland)	Pajtim Kasami	5						1			6			
9	FW	(Bulgaria)	Dimitar Berbatov	3									3			
9	MF	(Mali)	Mahamadou Diarra	1									1			
10	MF	(Germany)	Lewis Holtby	2									2			
11	MF	(Sweden)	Alexander Kačaniklić	1									1			
14	MF	(Greece)	Giorgos Karagounis	1			1			1			3			
15	MF	(England)	Kieran Richardson	5									5			
16	MF	(Republic of Ireland)	Damien Duff	1									1			
18	DF	(Northern Ireland)	Aaron Hughes	2									2			
20	FW	(Colombia)	Hugo Rodallega				1						1			
22	DF	(Montenegro)	Elsad Zverotić				1						1			
23	MF	(Ghana)	Derek Boateng	2			1						3			
24	MF	(Iran)	Ashkan Dejagah	5									5			
26	FW	(England)	Patrick Roberts	1									1			
27	DF	(Germany)	Sascha Riether	3									3			
28	MF	(England)	Scott Parker	6			1						7			
30	FW	(Netherlands)	Chris David	1									1			
35	DF	(Venezuela)	Fernando Amorebieta	6	1					1			7	1		
46	DF	(England)	Josh Passley							1			1			

|} Last updated: 11 May 2014
Source: 11v11
Ordered by (red card) , (second yellow card) and (yellow card)
(yellow card) = Number of bookings; (second yellow card) = Number of sending offs after a second yellow card; (red card) = Number of sending offs by a direct red card.

==== Suspensions ====
Last updated: 6 November 2013.

Player	Date Received	Offence	Length of suspension	
Sascha Riether	6 November 2013	FA charge for violent conduct	3 Matches	Liverpool (A), Swansea City (H), West Ham (A) (Premier League)
Fernando Amorebieta	22 March 2014	Sent off vs Manchester City	1 Match	Everton (H) (Premier League)
