= Manfred Russell =

Costa Rican footballer (born 1988)

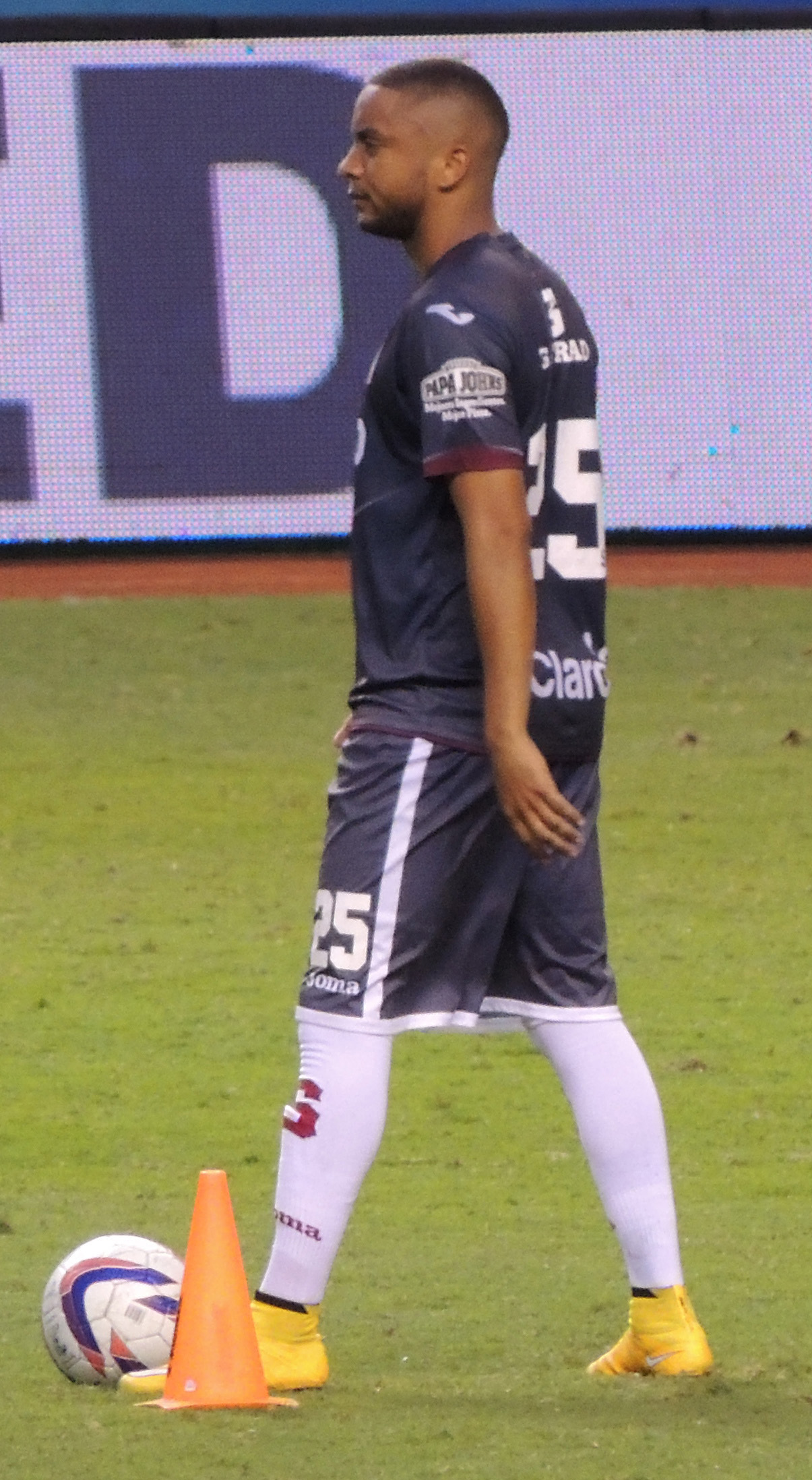

Personal information
- Full name: Manfred Russell Russell
- Date of birth: September 23, 1988 (age 38)
- Place of birth: San José, Costa Rica
- Height: 1.79 m (5 ft 10 1/2 in)
- Position: Midfielder

Team information
- Current team: Comunicaciones
- Number: 88

Senior career*
Years	Team	Apps	(Gls)
2007–2009	Saprissa	26	(1)
2010–2011	→ San Carlos (loan)	39	(4)
2011–2016	Saprissa	147	(15)
2015–2016	→ Antigua (loan)	35	(3)
2016–2017	Antigua	44	(4)
2017–2018	Comunicaciones	37	(10)
2018–2020	Cartaginés	76	(8)
2020–	Comunicaciones	13	(1)

International career
2010	Costa Rica	5	(0)
- * Club domestic league appearances and goals as of 31 December 2020

Manfred Russell Russell (born 23 September 1988) is a Costa Rican footballer who plays as a midfielder for Cartaginés.

== Club career ==
Russell started his career at Deportivo Saprissa before joining San Carlos ahead of the 2010 Verano season. He returned to Saprissa in 2011. In summer 2015, he joined Guatemalan side Antigua on a year's loan.

== International career ==
On 12 August 2010, he made his international debut in a friendly against Paraguay, the first of five successive friendlies he played that year.
