= Chris David (footballer) =

Dutch footballer (born 1993)

Personal information
- Full name: Christofer David
- Date of birth: 6 March 1993 (age 33)
- Place of birth: Amsterdam, Netherlands
- Height: 1.72 m (5 ft 8 in)
- Position: Midfielder

Team information
- Current team: Atlas Delmenhorst
- Number: 10

Youth career
- 2000–2013: Twente

Senior career*
Years	Team	Apps	(Gls)
2013–2015	Fulham	10	(1)
2015	→ Twente (loan)	2	(0)
2015	→ Jong Twente (loan)	12	(2)
2015–2017	Go Ahead Eagles	10	(2)
2017–2018	Utrecht	0	(0)
2017–2018	Jong Utrecht	12	(1)
2018–2019	Cape Town City	19	(2)
2020–2021	Würzburger Kickers	7	(0)
2021–2022	SSV Jeddeloh	21	(4)
2022–2024	Yeni Mersin İdmanyurdu	56	(5)
2025	Değirmenlik		
2026-	Atlas Delmenhorst	9	(2)

International career
2009–2010	Netherlands U17	8	(0)
2010–2011	Netherlands U18	6	(1)
2011–2012	Netherlands U19	8	(0)
- * Club domestic league appearances and goals as of 22 September 2026

Christofer David (born Chrístofer Gürkan, 6 March 1993) is a Dutch professional footballer who plays as a midfielder for German Regionalliga Nord club Atlas Delmenhorst

== Club career ==
=== Early career ===
Born in Amsterdam, Netherlands, David's family moved to Enschede when he was 3 years old. He joined FC Twente youth team at the age of seven and moved through the age groups at the Dutch club.

In 2010, together with his family, he switched the Turkish surname Gurkan for his originally Aramaic surname David.

=== Fulham ===
Former Fulham manager Martin Jol signed David, who was also attracting attention from Ajax on 4 January 2013 from Dutch club FC Twente.

David made his Fulham debut in the FA Cup third round against Norwich City at Carrow Road. On 11 May, the final day of the season with Fulham already relegated, David scored on his Premier League debut in the dying seconds to tie the game against Crystal Palace. Despite being featured for five matches at the start of the 2014–15 season and aiming for first team football, David's first team opportunities were soon limited under new manager Kit Symons.

=== Twente ===
On 31 January 2015, it was announced that David was sent on loan to his former club FC Twente until the end of the season. The club has the possibility to make the deal permanent. David did previously hint his return after they were relegated to the Football League Championship.

However, David was placed in the Jong FC Twente squad instead and made his debut against Almere City on 6 February 2015. David made his senior FC Twente debut on 22 February 2015, coming on as a substitute for Bilal Ould-Chikh in the 60th minute, in a 2–1 loss against Vitesse Arnhem. David made another league appearance, in a 1–1 draw against NAC Breda on 28 February 2015. After this, David continued to play for Jong FC Twente throughout the season. David was captain and scored his first goal, in a 2–2 draw against Volendam on 3 April 2015. David scored his second goal in the last game of the season against Achilles '29. At the end of the 2014–15 season, the club decided not to take up options to sign David permanently, as the club's financial problem believed to be the main factor.

Upon returning to Fulham, David was among nine players to be released by the club.

=== Go Ahead Eagles ===
On 14 August 2015, it was announced that David has been signed by Dutch Eerste Divisie side Go Ahead Eagles.

=== Cape Town City ===
On 23 February 2019, Cape Town City announced the signing of David on a contract until June 2021.

David played for Turkish side Yeni Mersin İdmanyurdu, when the region was hit by a heavy earthquake. He joined German side Atlas Delmenhorst from Northern Cyprus outfit Degirmenlik in January 2026.

== Career statistics ==
As of 1 June 2022

Appearances and goals by club, season and competition
Club	Season	League			Cup		Europe		Other		Total	
Club	Season	Division	Apps	Goals	Apps	Goals	Apps	Goals	Apps	Goals	Apps	Goals
Fulham	2013–14	Premier League	1	1	2	0	0	0	0	0	3	1
Fulham	2014–15	Championship	5	0	1	0	0	0	0	0	6	0
Fulham	Total		6	1	3	0	0	0	0	0	9	1
Twente	2014–15	Eredivisie	2	0	0	0	0	0	0	0	2	0
Jong FC Twente	2014–15	Eerste Divisie	12	2	0	0	0	0	0	0	12	2
Go Ahead Eagles	2015–16	Eerste Divisie	8	1	2	0	0	0	0	0	10	1
Jong FC Utrecht	2017–18	Eerste Divisie	12	1	0	0	0	0	0	0	12	1
Cape Town City	2018–19	South African Premier Division	8	1	1	0	0	0	0	0	9	1
Cape Town City	2019–20	South African Premier Division	9	1	1	0	0	0	1	0	11	1
Cape Town City	Total		17	2	2	0	0	0	1	0	20	2
Würzburger Kickers	2020–21	2. Bundesliga	7	0	0	0	0	0	0	0	7	0
SSV Jeddeloh	2021–22	Regionalliga Nord	23	4	0	0	0	0	0	0	23	4
Hapoel Ramat Gan	2022–23	Liga Leumit	0	0	0	0	0	0	0	0	0	0
Career total			87	11	7	0	0	0	1	0	95	11
