= 2018–19 Chelsea F.C. season =

English football club season

Chelsea
2018–19 season
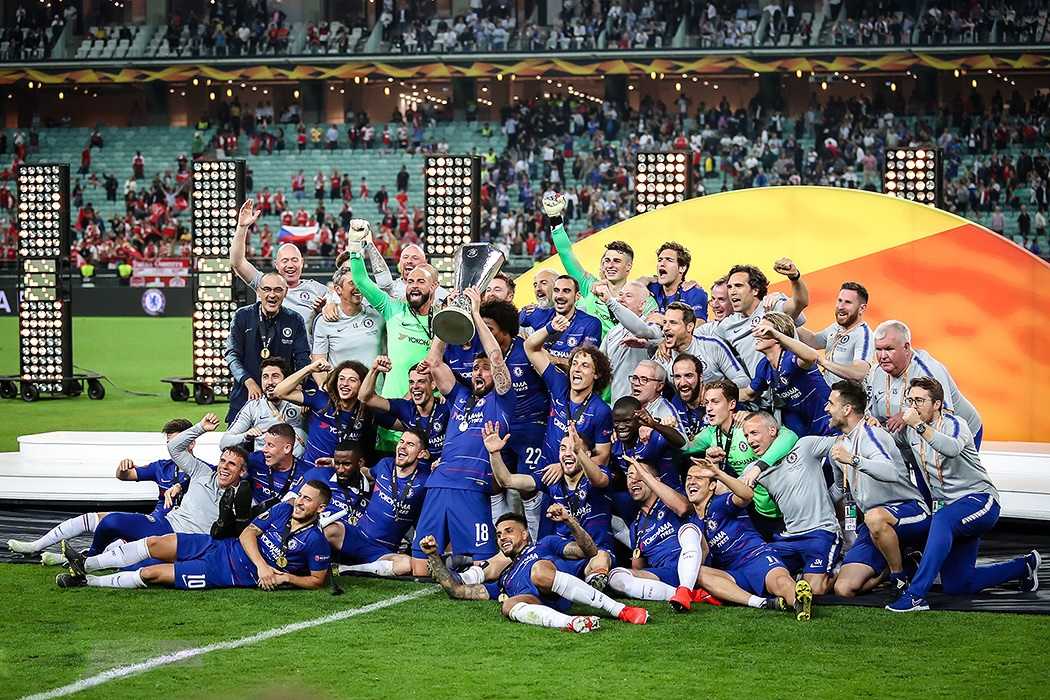
- Chelsea players celebrating their triumph in the 2019 UEFA Europa League final
- Owner: Roman Abramovich
- Chairman: Bruce Buck
- Head coach: Maurizio Sarri
- Stadium: Stamford Bridge
- Premier League: 3rd
- FA Cup: Fifth round
- EFL Cup: Runners-up
- FA Community Shield: Runners-up
- UEFA Europa League: Winners
- Top goalscorer: League: Eden Hazard (16); All: Eden Hazard (21)
- Highest home attendance: 40,721 (vs. Manchester United, 20 October 2018, Premier League)
- Lowest home attendance: 33,933 (vs. PAOK, 29 November 2018, UEFA Europa League)
- Average home league attendance: 40,441
- Biggest win: 5–0 (vs. Huddersfield Town, 2 February 2019, Premier League) (vs. Dynamo Kyiv, 14 March 2019, UEFA Europa League)
- Biggest defeat: 0–6 (vs. Manchester City, 10 February 2019, Premier League)
Home colours	Away colours	Third colours

The 2018–19 season was Chelsea's 105th competitive season, 30th consecutive season in the top flight of English football, 27th consecutive season in the Premier League, and 113th year in existence as a football club. The season covers the period from 1 July 2018 to 30 June 2019.

== Kits ==
Home	Home alt.	Home 2019–20	Away	Away alt.	Third	Third alt.

Goalkeeper 1	Goalkeeper 2	Goalkeeper 3

== Overview ==
=== August ===
Chelsea began the league campaign under new manager Sarri with a "comfortable" 3–0 victory at Huddersfield Town, with new midfielder Jorginho scoring a penalty on his debut, in between goals from N'Golo Kante and Pedro. This was followed by a home clash with Arsenal in the first home match of the season. After Pedro and Alvaro Morata quickly established a firm Chelsea advantage, Arsenal fought back to level before the break before Marcos Alonso won it late for the Blues. Chelsea then made the long trip to Newcastle, and took the lead with fourteen minutes to play with an Eden Hazard penalty. With seven minutes to play, striker Joselu leveled it up, however Chelsea would have the last word, with a DeAndre Yedlin own goal with three minutes left seeing them edge it 2–1.

Position at the end of August
Pos	Team	Pld	W	D	L	GF	GA	GD	Pts	Qualification
1	Liverpool	3	3	0	0	7	0	+7	9	Qualification for the Champions League group stage
2	Tottenham Hotspur	3	3	0	0	8	2	+6	9	Qualification for the Champions League group stage
3	Chelsea	3	3	0	0	8	3	+5	9	Qualification for the Champions League group stage
4	Watford	3	3	0	0	7	2	+5	9	Qualification for the Champions League group stage
5	Manchester City	3	2	1	0	9	2	+7	7	Qualification for the Europa League group stage

=== September ===
Chelsea began September by earning their fourth successive league win, courtesy of a 2–0 triumph over Bournemouth after goals from Pedro and Hazard late on. This was followed by a clash with Cardiff City, but Chelsea were silenced after a surprise early goal from Sol Bamba; however two goals in six minutes from Hazard ensured Chelsea took a 2–1 lead, before he completed his hat-trick ten minutes from time. A Willian goal soon afterwards sealed a 4–1 win. This was followed by a trip to Greek outfit PAOK Salonika in the opening group stage contest of that season's UEFA Europa League, with Chelsea playing in the competition for the first time since winning it in 2013. The Blues started off their campaign brightly, scoring after just seven minutes through Willian, but ultimately had to battle to a 1–0 win. However, Chelsea dropped their first points of the campaign against a West Ham team that had been winless at home thus far that season. drawing 0–0. Chelsea followed the point at the London Stadium with a League Cup third-round success at Liverpool. After falling behind on 56 minutes through Daniel Sturridge, Chelsea struck back through Emerson and Hazard to claim a 2–1 win. They then faced a Reds side with a stronger team sheet at Stamford Bridge in the league, but were undone thanks to a late Sturridge stunner, and had to settle for a 1–1 draw. However, with Hazard having scored five league goals in the month, including the hat-trick against Cardiff, he was awarded with the Premier League Player of the Month for September 2018.

Position at the end of September
Pos	Team	Pld	W	D	L	GF	GA	GD	Pts	Qualification
1	Manchester City	7	6	1	0	21	3	+18	19	Qualification for the Champions League group stage
2	Liverpool	7	6	1	0	14	2	+12	19	Qualification for the Champions League group stage
3	Chelsea	7	5	2	0	15	5	+10	17	Qualification for the Champions League group stage
4	Tottenham Hotspur	7	5	0	2	14	7	+7	15	Qualification for the Champions League group stage
5	Arsenal	7	5	0	2	14	9	+5	15	Qualification for the Europa League group stage

=== October ===
October began with a narrow win over Hungarians MOL Vidi in the Europa League, with Morata scoring the game's only goal with twenty minutes to play. Chelsea then turned on the style in a 3–0 league win at Southampton, with Ross Barkley scoring his first of the season in between Hazard and Morata goals. Next up, Jose Mourinho – who had won three Premier League titles with Chelsea – made his return to Stamford Bridge as manager of Manchester United, who were eighth in the league and struggling. Chelsea took a 1–0 lead into half-time after a looping header from Antonio Rudiger, but a quickfire double from Anthony Martial in the second half put United in front; however, a 96th-minute equalizer from Ross Barkley kept Chelsea's unbeaten season intact. Chelsea maintained their perfect Europa League record after a hat-trick for Ruben Loftus-Cheek helped them to a 3–1 win over Belarusian BATE Borisov, before the young English forward scored his first league goal of the season to cap off a "commanding" 4–0 destruction of Burnley at Turf Moor. Chelsea then battled to a 3–2 home win over Derby County in the League Cup last 16, with all five goals coming in an eventful first half, with Fikayo Tomori and Cesc Fabregas (along with a Richard Keogh own goal) on target for the Blues.

Position at the end of October
Pos	Team	Pld	W	D	L	GF	GA	GD	Pts	Qualification
1	Manchester City	10	8	2	0	27	3	+24	26	Qualification for the Champions League group stage
2	Liverpool	10	8	2	0	19	3	+16	26	Qualification for the Champions League group stage
3	Chelsea	10	7	3	0	24	7	+17	24	Qualification for the Champions League group stage
4	Arsenal	10	7	1	2	24	13	+11	22	Qualification for the Champions League group stage
5	Tottenham Hotspur	10	7	0	3	16	8	+8	21	Qualification for the Europa League group stage

=== November ===
Chelsea began November with a 3–1 home win over Crystal Palace, thanks largely to Morata's double. A nervy 1–0 win at BATE followed, with Olivier Giroud scoring his first goal under Maurizio Sarri, sealing a spot in the last 32 of the Europa League. Afterwards, Chelsea extended their unbeaten run of the campaign to eighteen matches after a goalless draw at home with Everton. However, their unbeaten record under Sarri was halted at that figure, with several defensive lapses seeing them fall to a 3–1 loss at Tottenham. Chelsea, however, recovered well by securing top spot in their Europa League group with a dominant 4–0 win over PAOK Salonika, with Giroud scoring twice and Callum Hudson-Odoi getting his first senior goal in a convincing display to cap off November.

Position at the end of November
Pos	Team	Pld	W	D	L	GF	GA	GD	Pts	Qualification
2	Liverpool	13	10	3	0	25	4	+21	33	Qualification for the Champions League group stage
3	Tottenham Hotspur	13	10	0	3	23	11	+12	30	Qualification for the Champions League group stage
4	Chelsea	13	8	4	1	28	11	+17	28	Qualification for the Champions League group stage
5	Arsenal	13	8	3	2	28	16	+12	27	Qualification for the Europa League group stage
6	Everton	13	6	4	3	20	15	+5	22	

=== December ===
Chelsea began December with a routine 2–0 home win over Fulham, thanks to goals from Pedro and Loftus-Cheek. before losing for just the second time that season, away to Wolves. After Ruben Loftus-Cheek gave Chelsea a first-half lead, the hosts struck back with second-half goals from Raul Jiminez and Diogo Jota to claim a 2–1 win. Chelsea were underdogs heading into a clash against a Manchester City team who had not lost domestically since April. However, despite being outplayed for large periods of the contest, a rocket-shot from Kante and a looping header from David Luiz sealed a memorable 2–0 win to ensure Chelsea's return to the top four. Chelsea then completed their Europa League group campaign with a 2–2 draw away to MOL Vidi. After going ahead through Willian, an Ethan Ampadu own goal and Loic Nego's sweet volley put the home side ahead, before a late leveller from Giroud sealed a point. After first-half goals from Pedro and Hazard helped Chelsea battle past a resilient Brighton team, Maurizio Sarri's team set up a League Cup semi-final with London rivals Tottenham after scraping past Bournemouth 1–0 in the quarter-finals. However, this was followed by a frustrating home defeat to Leicester City, with the Foxes becoming the first team to win at Stamford Bridge all year thanks to Jamie Vardy's 51st-minute effort. After goals from either side in first-half stoppage-time, Eden Hazard's penalty won the day at Watford, before 2018 ended on a high for Chelsea after N'Golo Kante scored the only goal at Selhurst Park against Crystal Palace.

Position at the end of December
Pos	Team	Pld	W	D	L	GF	GA	GD	Pts	Qualification
2	Manchester City	20	15	2	3	52	14	+38	47	Qualification for the Champions League group stage
3	Tottenham Hotspur	20	15	0	5	43	21	+22	45	Qualification for the Champions League group stage
4	Chelsea	20	13	4	3	38	16	+22	43	Qualification for the Champions League group stage
5	Arsenal	20	11	5	4	42	30	+12	38	Qualification for the Europa League group stage
6	Manchester United	20	10	5	5	41	32	+9	35	

=== January ===
A disappointing goalless draw at home with Southampton was not the best way possible to start the new year, but Chelsea soon secured their first win of 2019 after beating Nottingham Forest 2–0 in the FA Cup third round. However, a 1–0 reverse to Tottenham in the first leg of the League Cup semi-final followed, before goals from Pedro and Willian earned a 2–1 victory over Newcastle United. Chelsea (in fourth) had the gap to fifth closed to three points after Arsenal won 2–0 in a one-sided London derby, before beating Tottenham 4–2 on penalties after winning 2–1 in the second leg of the League Cup semi-final, to set up a final against holders Manchester City. They then strolled to a 3–0 win over Sheffield Wednesday in the FA Cup fourth round, before falling out of the top four after suffering a 4–0 league reverse at Bournemouth.

Chelsea only signed two players in January; the first was Juventus` Argentine forward Gonzalo Higuain, who arrived on loan for the remainder of the season, with an option to buy at the end. The second was young American prospect Christian Pulisic, who signed from Borussia Dortmund, though was sent back on loan to Germany for the remainder of the campaign. A host of players departed on loan, among them Alvaro Morata to Spaniards Atletico Madrid and Michy Batshuayi to Fenerbahce. Five players also departed permanently, most notably Cesc Fabregas, who joined French side AS Monaco.

Position at the end of January
Pos	Team	Pld	W	D	L	GF	GA	GD	Pts	Qualification
3	Tottenham Hotspur	24	18	0	6	50	24	+26	54	Qualification for the Champions League group stage
4	Arsenal	24	14	5	5	50	33	+17	47	Qualification for the Champions League group stage
5	Chelsea	24	14	5	5	40	23	+17	47	Qualification for the Europa League group stage
6	Manchester United	24	13	6	5	48	35	+13	45	
7	Wolverhampton Wanderers	24	10	5	9	31	32	−1	35	

=== February ===
Chelsea returned to fourth after walloping Huddersfield Town 5–0 in the Premier League, with January signing Gonzalo Higuain scoring twice on his home debut. However, Chelsea's flaws were exposed after being beaten 6–0 at Manchester City, in their heaviest league defeat since 1992, when they lost 7–0 to Nottingham Forest. After the City drubbing, Chelsea earned a 2–1 win away to Swedish outfit Malmo FF in the first leg of the Europa League last 32. An FA Cup exit to Manchester United was followed by the second leg, which Chelsea won 3–0 to secure passage to the last 16. Chelsea then faced Manchester City in the League Cup final, and put in a solid defensive display to draw 0–0. In extra-time, however, manager Sarri attempted to call goalkeeper Kepa Arrizabalaga off, but the Spanish stopper refused to be substituted, and City went on to win 4–3 on penalties. Chelsea ended February with a critical home match against Tottenham in the league. After taking the lead through Pedro, Chelsea won 2–0 after a Kieran Trippier backpass rolled into his own net.

Position at the end of February
Pos	Team	Pld	W	D	L	GF	GA	GD	Pts	Qualification
4	Arsenal	28	17	5	6	60	38	+22	56	Qualification for the Champions League group stage
5	Manchester United	28	16	7	5	55	36	+19	55	Qualification for the Europa League group stage
6	Chelsea	27	16	5	6	47	29	+18	53	
7	Wolverhampton Wanderers	28	11	7	10	36	36	0	40	
8	Watford	28	11	7	10	39	40	−1	40	

=== March ===
March began with Higuain scoring his first away goal for Chelsea in a narrow 2–1 success at Fulham, before goals from Pedro, Willian and Hudson-Odoi ensured a 3–0 first leg win over Dynamo Kyiv in the last 16 of the Europa League. A stoppage-time equalizer from Eden Hazard earned them a point against Wolves, before Olivier Giroud's first Chelsea hat-trick ensured a memorable 5–0 win away to Dynamo Kyiv, and an 8–0 aggregate victory. A 2–0 league loss to Everton further dented Chelsea's Champions League qualification hopes, before March ended with a controversial win at Cardiff City, with Cesar Azpilicueta scoring from an offside position and Cardiff having at least "two good penalty shouts." waved away.

Position at the end of March
Pos	Team	Pld	W	D	L	GF	GA	GD	Pts	Qualification
4	Manchester United	31	18	7	6	60	41	+19	61	Qualification for the Champions League group stage
5	Arsenal	30	18	6	6	63	39	+24	60	Qualification for the Europa League group stage
6	Chelsea	31	18	6	7	52	34	+18	60	
7	Wolverhampton Wanderers	31	12	8	11	39	39	0	44	
8	Leicester City	32	13	5	14	42	43	−1	44	

=== April ===
Chelsea maintained their 100% league record against Brighton with a 3–0 victory at Stamford Bridge that lifted them to fifth. Eden Hazard scored what would win the Premier League goal of the Month for April with a fantastic solo effort as the forward netted a brace in the 2–0 win over West Ham United. A late Marcos Alonso header earned Chelsea a 1–0 away win in the first leg of the Europa League quarter-finals against Czech Slavia Prague, before second-half goals from Sadio Mane and Mohamed Salah saw Chelsea lose 2–0 at Liverpool in the league. However, they followed this up with a thrilling 4–3 win against Slavia Prague in the return quarter-final leg of the Europa League, with Chelsea leading 4–1 after 27 minutes. Chelsea then drew with Burnley 2–2, as Kante scored his first goal of 2019 and Higuain adding his fourth for the club. All four goals came in a thrilling opening 24 minutes, before April finished with Alonso cancelling out Juan Mata's opener in a 1–1 draw away with Manchester United.

Position at the end of April
Pos	Team	Pld	W	D	L	GF	GA	GD	Pts	Qualification
2	Liverpool (Q)	36	28	7	1	83	19	+64	91	Qualification for the Champions League group stage
3	Tottenham Hotspur (T)	36	23	1	12	65	36	+29	70	Qualification for the Champions League group stage
4	Chelsea (T)	36	20	8	8	59	38	+21	68	Qualification for the Champions League group stage
5	Arsenal (T)	36	20	6	10	69	49	+20	66	Qualification for the Europa League group stage
6	Manchester United (T)	36	19	8	9	64	51	+13	65	Qualification for the Europa League second qualifying round

(Q) Qualified for the phase indicated; (T) Qualified, but not yet for the particular phase indicated

=== May ===
May began with a tense 1–1 draw away to German Eintracht Frankfurt in the first leg of the Europa League semi-final, with Pedro lashing home an equalizer just before half-time. Chelsea then secured a top-four finish for the first time since 2017, after second-half goals from Ruben Loftus-Cheek, David Luiz and Gonzalo Higuain earned a 3–0 home win against Watford. Chelsea then faced Frankfurt in the second leg of the Europa League semi-final and, after taking the lead through Loftus-Cheek, were forced into extra-time after a second-half goal from Luka Jovic. Cesar Azpilicueta had a goal disallowed for a foul on goalie Trapp in the build-up, before Eden Hazard scored the winning penalty in the shootout to send Chelsea to meet Arsenal's 7–3 aggregate winners over Valencia in the final in Baku, Azerbaijan. Chelsea's final day draw at Leicester secured a third-place league finish, with Chelsea having amassed 72 points from a possible 114. Chelsea collected one individual award for the league campaign, with Eden Hazards 15 assists enough to earn him the Premier League Playmaker Award for the most assists, whilst also collecting the Chelsea Player of the Year, Players` Player of the Year and Goal of the Year. After a 3–0 win away to New England Revolution in a warm-up friendly, Chelsea faced Arsenal in the UEFA Europa League final. After a tense first half of few openings, Olivier Giroud nodded Chelsea in front on 49 minutes, and the team soon were ahead 2–0 after Pedro swept home on the hour mark. Hazard made it 3–0 from the spot before Alex Iwobi pulled on back for Arsenal; however, a second from Hazard sealed the game ensured a 4–1 win as Chelsea won the Europa League for the second time in their history.

==== Final league position ====
Pos	Team	Pld	W	D	L	GF	GA	GD	Pts	Qualification or relegation
1	Manchester City (C)	38	32	2	4	95	23	+72	98	Qualification to Champions League group stage
2	Liverpool	38	30	7	1	89	22	+67	97	Qualification to Champions League group stage
3	Chelsea	38	21	9	8	63	39	+24	72	Qualification to Champions League group stage
4	Tottenham Hotspur	38	23	2	13	67	39	+28	71	Qualification to Champions League group stage
5	Arsenal	38	21	7	10	73	51	+22	70	Qualification to Europa League group stage (Note: Since the winners of the EFL Cup and the FA Cup, Manchester City, qualified for the Champions League, the spot given to the FA Cup winners (Europa League group stage) was passed to the sixth-placed team and the spot given to the League Cup winners (Europa League second qualifying round) was passed to the seventh-placed team.)

Source: Premier League
Rules for classification: 1) Points; 2) Goal difference; 3) Goals scored; 4) Play-offs (only if needed to decide champion, teams for relegation or teams for UEFA competitions).
(C) Champions

== Management team ==
Position	Name
Head coach	(Italy) Maurizio Sarri
Assistant coaches	(Italy) Gianfranco Zola
Assistant coaches	(Italy) Luca Gotti
Assistant coaches	(Italy) Carlo Cudicini
Second assistant coach	(Italy) Marco Ianni
Goalkeeper coaches	(Italy) Massimo Nenci
Goalkeeper coaches	(Portugal) Henrique Hilário
Fitness coach	(Italy) Paolo Bertelli
Assistant fitness coaches	(Italy) Davide Ranzato
Assistant fitness coaches	(Italy) Davide Losi
Scout	(Italy) Gianni Picchioni

== Players ==
No.	Pos.	Player	Nationality	Date of birth (age)	Since	Ends	Apps	Goals
1	GK	Kepa Arrizabalaga	(Spain)	3 October 1994 (aged 24)	2018	2025	54	0
2	DF	Antonio Rüdiger	(Germany)	3 March 1993 (aged 26)	2017	2022	89	4
3	DF	Marcos Alonso	(Spain)	28 December 1990 (aged 28)	2016	2023	120	18
5	MF	Jorginho	(Italy)	20 December 1991 (aged 27)	2018	2023	54	2
6	MF	Danny Drinkwater	(England)	5 March 1990 (aged 29)	2017	2022	23	1
7	MF	N'Golo Kanté	(France)	29 March 1991 (aged 28)	2016	2023	142	8
8	MF	Ross Barkley	(England)	5 December 1993 (aged 25)	2018	2023	52	5
9	FW	Gonzalo Higuaín	(Argentina)	10 December 1987 (aged 31)	2019	2019	18	5
10	MF	Eden Hazard	(Belgium)	7 January 1991 (aged 28)	2012	2020	352	110
11	MF	Pedro	(Spain)	28 July 1987 (aged 31)	2015	2020	183	41
12	MF	Ruben Loftus-Cheek	(England)	23 January 1996 (aged 23)	2014	2021	72	12
13	GK	Willy Caballero	(Argentina)	28 September 1981 (aged 37)	2017	2020	22	0
17	MF	Mateo Kovačić	(Croatia)	6 May 1994 (aged 25)	2018	2019	51	0
18	FW	Olivier Giroud	(France)	30 September 1986 (aged 32)	2018	2020	63	18
20	MF	Callum Hudson-Odoi	(England)	7 November 2000 (aged 18)	2017	2020	28	5
21	DF	Davide Zappacosta	(Italy)	11 June 1992 (aged 27)	2017	2021	52	2
22	MF	Willian	(Brazil)	9 August 1988 (aged 30)	2013	2020	292	52
24	DF	Gary Cahill ^{(C)}	(England)	19 December 1985 (aged 33)	2012	2019	290	25
27	DF	Andreas Christensen	(Denmark)	10 April 1996 (aged 23)	2012	2022	72	0
28	DF	César Azpilicueta ^{(VC)}	(Spain)	28 August 1989 (aged 29)	2012	2022	337	9
30	DF	David Luiz	(Brazil)	22 April 1987 (aged 32)	2016	2021	248	18
31	GK	Robert Green	(England)	18 January 1980 (aged 39)	2018	2019	0	0
33	DF	Emerson	(Italy)	3 August 1994 (aged 24)	2018	2022	34	1
44	DF	Ethan Ampadu	(Wales)	14 September 2000 (aged 18)	2017	2023	12	0
51	MF	Conor Gallagher	(England)	6 February 2000 (aged 19)	2019	2021	0	0
52	GK	Jamie Cumming	(England)	4 September 1999 (aged 19)	2018	2021	0	0
53	DF	Marc Guehi	(England)	13 July 2000 (aged 18)	2019	2020	0	0
55	MF	George McEachran	(England)	30 August 2000 (aged 18)	2018	2019	0	0
59	GK	Marcin Bułka	(Poland)	4 October 1999 (aged 19)	2018	2019	0	0

Last updated: 30 June 2019.
Source: Chelsea F.C.

== New contracts ==
No.	Pos.	Player	Date	Until	Source
46	MF	(Scotland) Ruben Sammut	19 June 2018	30 June 2019	
64	DF	(England) Reece James	27 June 2018	30 June 2022	
58	FW	(Netherlands) Daishawn Redan	4 July 2018	30 June 2021	
60	MF	(Scotland) Billy Gilmour	4 July 2018	30 June 2021	
66	GK	(Ivory Coast) Nicolas Tie	4 July 2018	30 June 2021	
63	GK	(Croatia) Karlo Žiger	4 July 2018	30 June 2021	
70	MF	(England) Clinton Mola	4 July 2018	30 June 2020	
65	DF	(England) Renedi Masampu	4 July 2018	30 June 2019	
	MF	(Serbia) Danilo Pantić	5 July 2018	30 June 2021	
37	GK	(Portugal) Eduardo	6 July 2018	30 June 2019	
62	DF	(Portugal) Marcel Lavinier	20 July 2018	30 June 2020	
	MF	(Ivory Coast) Victorien Angban	27 July 2018	30 June 2020	
11	MF	(Spain) Pedro	3 August 2018	30 June 2020	
	DF	(United States) Matt Miazga	6 August 2018	30 June 2022	
	DF	(England) Fikayo Tomori	6 August 2018	30 June 2021	
41	DF	(Nigeria) Ola Aina	14 August 2018	30 June 2021	
44	DF	(Wales) Ethan Ampadu	19 September 2018	30 June 2023	
	MF	(England) Marcel Lewis	3 October 2018	30 June 2021	
51	MF	(England) Conor Gallagher	22 October 2018	30 June 2021	
3	DF	(Spain) Marcos Alonso	24 October 2018	30 June 2023	
50	FW	(England) Charlie Brown	29 October 2018	30 June 2021	
52	GK	(England) Jamie Cumming	6 November 2018	30 June 2021	
7	MF	(France) N'Golo Kanté	23 November 2018	30 June 2023	
	FW	(Republic of Ireland) George Nunn	23 November 2018	30 June 2021	
64	MF	(England) Tino Anjorin	27 November 2018	30 June 2021	
28	DF	(Spain) César Azpilicueta	4 December 2018	30 June 2022	
	GK	(England) Nathan Baxter	21 December 2018	30 June 2023	
	MF	(Austria) Thierno Ballo	4 January 2019	30 June 2021	
	DF	(France) Pierre Ekwah-Elimby	17 January 2019	30 June 2021	
67	DF	(Netherlands) Ian Maatsen	13 March 2019	30 June 2021	
	DF	(England) Dynel Simeu	18 March 2019	30 June 2021	
30	DF	(Brazil) David Luiz	10 May 2019	30 June 2021	
18	FW	(France) Olivier Giroud	21 May 2019	30 June 2020	
13	GK	(Argentina) Willy Caballero	22 May 2019	30 June 2020	

== Transfers ==
=== In ===
==== Summer ====
Date	No.	Pos.	Player	From	Fee	Source
1 July 2018	67	DF	(Netherlands) Ian Maatsen	(Netherlands) PSV Eindhoven	£100,000	
1 July 2018		DF	(Northern Ireland) Sam McClelland	(Northern Ireland) Coleraine	Undisclosed	
1 July 2018		DF	(France) Pierre Ekwah-Elimby	(France) Nantes	£1,800,000	
1 July 2018		MF	(Austria) Thierno Ballo	(Germany) Viktoria Köln	£140,000	
1 July 2018		FW	(Republic of Ireland) George Nunn	(England) Crewe Alexandra	£310,000	
14 July 2018	5	MF	(Italy) Jorginho	(Italy) Napoli	£51,300,000	
26 July 2018	31	GK	(England) Robert Green	(England) Huddersfield Town	Free	
8 August 2018	1	GK	(Spain) Kepa Arrizabalaga	(Spain) Athletic Bilbao	£72,000,000	
22 October 2018		GK	(Finland) Lucas Bergström	(Finland) TPS	Undisclosed	

==== Winter ====
Date	No.	Pos.	Player	From	Fee	Source
1 January 2019		DF	(England) Josh Brooking	(England) Reading	Undisclosed	
2 January 2019		MF	(United States) Christian Pulisic	(Germany) Borussia Dortmund	£57,600,000	

=== Loan in ===
==== Summer ====
Date	Until	No.	Pos.	Player	From	Fee	Source
9 August 2018	30 June 2019	17	MF	(Croatia) Mateo Kovačić	(Spain) Real Madrid	Free	

==== Winter ====
Date	Until	No.	Pos.	Player	From	Fee	Source
23 January 2019	30 June 2019	9	FW	(Argentina) Gonzalo Higuaín	(Italy) Juventus	£7,020,000	

=== Out ===
==== Summer ====
Date	No.	Pos.	Player	To	Fee	Source
1 July 2018		GK	(Croatia) Matej Delač	(Denmark) Horsens	Free	
1 July 2018		GK	(England) Mitchell Beeney	(Republic of Ireland) Sligo Rovers	Free	
1 July 2018	57	MF	(Scotland) Harvey St Clair	(Italy) Venezia	Free	
1 July 2018		DF	(Brazil) Wallace	Unattached (Note: Wallace joined Figueirense on 21 January 2019)		
2 July 2018	43	MF	(Wales) Isaac Christie-Davies	(England) Liverpool	Free	
6 July 2018		DF	(England) Jonathan Panzo	(France) Monaco	£2,700,000	
6 July 2018		MF	(England) Jordan Houghton	(England) Milton Keynes Dons	Free	
21 July 2018		MF	(Ivory Coast) Jérémie Boga	(Italy) Sassuolo	£2,700,000	
7 August 2018	52	DF	(Wales) Cole Dasilva	(England) Brentford	Free	
9 August 2018	13	GK	(Belgium) Thibaut Courtois	(Spain) Real Madrid	£31,500,000	
23 August 2018		MF	(England) Tushaun Walters	(England) Greenwich Borough	Free	

==== Winter ====
Date	No.	Pos.	Player	To	Fee	Source
11 January 2019	4	MF	(Spain) Cesc Fàbregas	(France) Monaco	£8,100,000	
25 January 2019		MF	(England) Charlie Colkett	(Sweden) Östersund	Undisclosed	
31 January 2019		FW	(Colombia) Joao Rodríguez	Unattached (Note: Rodríguez joined Central Córdoba on 27 July 2019)		
31 January 2019		DF	(England) Charlie Wakefield	(England) Coventry City	Free	
31 January 2019		FW	(Scotland) Islam Feruz	Retired		

=== Loan out ===
==== Summer ====
Date	Until	No.	Pos.	Player	To	Fee	Source
1 July 2018	29 January 2019		DF	(Ghana) Baba Rahman	(Germany) Schalke	Free	
1 July 2018	3 January 2019	46	MF	(Scotland) Ruben Sammut	(Scotland) Falkirk	Free	
1 July 2018	31 May 2019	50	DF	(England) Trevoh Chalobah	(England) Ipswich Town	Free	
1 July 2018	31 May 2019		GK	(England) Nathan Baxter	(England) Yeovil Town	Free	
1 July 2018	31 May 2019	64	DF	(England) Reece James	(England) Wigan Athletic	Free	
1 July 2018	31 May 2019	66	DF	(England) Dujon Sterling	(England) Coventry City	Free	
1 July 2018	9 January 2019		MF	(England) Lewis Baker	(England) Leeds United	Free	
2 July 2018	30 June 2019		DF	(England) Jake Clarke-Salter	(Netherlands) Vitesse	Free	
5 July 2018	30 June 2019		MF	(Serbia) Danilo Pantić	(Serbia) Partizan	Free	
6 July 2018	30 June 2019	37	GK	(Portugal) Eduardo	(Netherlands) Vitesse	Free	
12 July 2018	31 May 2019		MF	(Brazil) Kenedy	(England) Newcastle United	Free	
12 July 2018	31 January 2019		FW	(Colombia) Joao Rodríguez	(Spain) Tenerife	Free	
14 July 2018	3 January 2019	36	MF	(United States) Kyle Scott	(Netherlands) Telstar	Free	
16 July 2018	16 November 2018		GK	(England) Jamal Blackman	(England) Leeds United	Free	
17 July 2018	31 May 2019		DF	(England) Todd Kane	(England) Hull City	Free	
17 July 2018	31 May 2019		MF	(England) Mason Mount	(England) Derby County	Free	
21 July 2018	31 December 2018		MF	(England) Charlie Colkett	(England) Shrewsbury Town	Free	
24 July 2018	30 June 2019		MF	(Brazil) Nathan	(Brazil) Atlético Mineiro	Free	
25 July 2018	30 June 2019		MF	(Croatia) Mario Pašalić	(Italy) Atalanta	£900,000	
26 July 2018	31 May 2019	54	MF	(England) Jacob Maddox	(England) Cheltenham Town	Free	
27 July 2018	31 May 2019		MF	(Ivory Coast) Victorien Angban	(France) Metz	Free	
30 July 2018	9 January 2019		MF	(England) Kasey Palmer	(England) Blackburn Rovers	Free	
6 August 2018	25 January 2019		DF	(United States) Matt Miazga	(France) Nantes	£270,000	
6 August 2018	31 May 2019		DF	(England) Fikayo Tomori	(England) Derby County	Free	
9 August 2018	31 May 2019		DF	(England) Jay Dasilva	(England) Bristol City	Free	
9 August 2018	31 May 2019		DF	(France) Kurt Zouma	(England) Everton	£7,110,000	
10 August 2018	30 June 2019		MF	(Ecuador) Josimar Quintero	(Spain) Lleida Esportiu	Free	
10 August 2018	31 January 2019	23	FW	(Belgium) Michy Batshuayi	(Spain) Valencia	£2,700,000	
14 August 2018	30 June 2019	14	MF	(France) Tiémoué Bakayoko	(Italy) Milan	£4,500,000	
14 August 2018	30 June 2019	41	DF	(Nigeria) Ola Aina	(Italy) Torino	£540,000	
15 August 2018	30 June 2019		DF	(Nigeria) Kenneth Omeruo	(Spain) Leganés	£720,000	
23 August 2018	31 May 2019		DF	(Czech Republic) Tomáš Kalas	(England) Bristol City	Free	
30 August 2018	6 January 2019	43	FW	(England) Ike Ugbo	(England) Scunthorpe United	Free	
30 August 2018	31 May 2019		FW	(England) Isaiah Brown	(England) Leeds United	Free	
31 August 2018	31 May 2019		GK	(England) Bradley Collins	(England) Burton Albion	Free	
31 August 2018	31 May 2019		DF	(Jamaica) Michael Hector	(England) Sheffield Wednesday	Free	
31 August 2018	31 May 2019	19	FW	(England) Tammy Abraham	(England) Aston Villa	Free	
31 August 2018	30 June 2019	48	MF	(Belgium) Kylian Hazard	(Belgium) Cercle Brugge	Free	
31 August 2018	30 June 2019	32	MF	(Belgium) Charly Musonda	(Netherlands) Vitesse	Free	
31 August 2018	30 June 2019	42	DF	(England) Fankaty Dabo	(Netherlands) Sparta Rotterdam	Free	
26 October 2018	26 December 2018		GK	(United States) Ethan Wady	(England) Stevenage	Free	

==== Winter ====
Date	Until	No.	Pos.	Player	To	Fee	Source
1 January 2019	31 May 2019	68	GK	(Northern Ireland) Jared Thompson	(Northern Ireland) Warrenpoint Town	Free	
2 January 2019	30 June 2019		MF	(United States) Christian Pulisic	(Germany) Borussia Dortmund	Free	
9 January 2019	31 May 2019		MF	(England) Kasey Palmer	(England) Bristol City	Free	
9 January 2019	31 May 2019		MF	(England) Lewis Baker	(England) Reading	Free	
11 January 2019	31 May 2019	46	DF	(England) Josh Grant	(England) Yeovil Town	Free	
11 January 2019	31 May 2019	63	GK	(Croatia) Karlo Ziger	(England) Sutton United	Free	
25 January 2019	31 May 2019		DF	(United States) Matt Miazga	(England) Reading	Free	
25 January 2019	30 June 2020	15	MF	(Nigeria) Victor Moses	(Turkey) Fenerbahçe	Free	
25 January 2019	31 May 2019		DF	(England) Jack Wakely	(England) Basingstoke Town	Free	
28 January 2019	30 June 2020	29	FW	(Spain) Álvaro Morata	(Spain) Atlético Madrid	£6,300,000	
29 January 2019	30 June 2019		DF	(Ghana) Baba Rahman	(France) Reims	Free	
31 January 2019	30 June 2019	34	MF	(Brazil) Lucas Piazon	(Italy) Chievo	Free	
31 January 2019	31 May 2019		FW	(Belgium) Michy Batshuayi	(England) Crystal Palace	£1,040,000	
23 March 2019	31 May 2019		GK	(United States) Ethan Wady	(England) Tooting & Mitcham United	Free	

=== Overall transfer activity ===
==== Expenditure ====
Summer: ▼£125,650,000

Winter: ▼£64,620,000

Total: ▼£190,270,000

==== Income ====
Summer: ▲£53,640,000

Winter: ▲£15,440,000

Total: ▲£69,080,000

==== Net totals ====
Summer: ▼£72,010,000

Winter: ▼£49,180,000

Total: ▼£121,190,000

== Friendlies ==
=== Friendlies ===
23 July 2018	Perth Glory	0–1	Chelsea	Perth, Australia
19:30 AWST	Santalab (yellow card) 87'	Report	Pedro 5'; David Luiz (yellow card) 36'	Stadium: Optus Stadium; Attendance: 55,522; Referee: Shaun Evans (Australia)

15 May 2019	New England Revolution	0–3	Chelsea	Foxborough, United States
20:10 EDT		Report	Barkley 3', 62'; Giroud 29'	Stadium: Gillette Stadium; Attendance: 27,329; Referee: Nima Saghafi (United States)

=== International Champions Cup ===
==== Tables ====
Pos	Team	Pld	W	PW	PL	L	GF	GA	GD	Pts
6	(Spain) Real Madrid	3	2	0	0	1	6	4	+2	6
7	(Italy) Juventus	3	1	1	0	1	4	4	0	5
8	(England) Chelsea	3	0	2	1	0	2	2	0	5
9	(England) Manchester United	3	1	1	0	1	4	6	−2	5
10	(France) Lyon	3	1	0	1	1	3	3	0	4

Source: ICC
Rules for classification: 1) Points; 2) Head-to-head points; 3) Goal differential; 4) Goals scored; 5) Result against common opponent; 6) Fewer red cards; 7) Fewer yellow cards; 8) Fewer fouls committed; 9) Coin flip.

==== Matches ====
28 July 2018	Chelsea	1–1 (5–4 p)	Internazionale	Nice, France
20:05 CEST	Pedro 8'	Report	Gagliardini 49'; D'Ambrosio (yellow card) 86'	Stadium: Allianz Riviera; Attendance: 8,000; Referee: Nicolas Rainville (France)
	Penalties
	Jorginho (penalty scored); Drinkwater (penalty scored); Moses (penalty scored); Abraham (penalty scored); Azpilicueta (penalty scored)		(penalty scored) Ranocchia; (penalty scored) Gagliardini; (penalty scored) Martínez; (penalty missed) Škriniar; (penalty scored) Karamoh

1 August 2018	Arsenal	1–1 (6–5 p)	Chelsea	Dublin, Republic of Ireland
20:05 IST	Lacazette 90+3'	Report	Rüdiger 5'	Stadium: Aviva Stadium; Attendance: 46,002; Referee: Paul McLaughlin (Republic of Ireland)
	Penalties
	Lacazette (penalty scored); Nelson (penalty scored); Guendouzi (penalty scored); Maitland-Niles (penalty scored); Özil (penalty scored); Iwobi (penalty scored)		(penalty scored) Drinkwater; (penalty scored) Abraham; (penalty scored) Moses; (penalty scored) Emerson; (penalty scored) Piazon; (penalty missed) Loftus-Cheek

7 August 2018	Chelsea	0–0 (5–4 p)	Lyon	London, England
20:05 BST		Report		Stadium: Stamford Bridge; Attendance: 18,457; Referee: Paul Tierney (England)
	Penalties
	Jorginho (penalty scored); Barkley (penalty scored); Alonso (penalty scored); Azpilicueta (penalty scored); Hazard (penalty scored)		(penalty scored) Ferri; (penalty scored) Marcelo; (penalty scored) Gouiri; (penalty scored) Tete; (penalty missed) Diop

== Competitions ==
=== Premier League ===
==== Tables ====
Pos	Team	Pld	W	D	L	GF	GA	GD	Pts	Qualification or relegation
1	Manchester City (C)	38	32	2	4	95	23	+72	98	Qualification to Champions League group stage
2	Liverpool	38	30	7	1	89	22	+67	97	Qualification to Champions League group stage
3	Chelsea	38	21	9	8	63	39	+24	72	Qualification to Champions League group stage
4	Tottenham Hotspur	38	23	2	13	67	39	+28	71	Qualification to Champions League group stage
5	Arsenal	38	21	7	10	73	51	+22	70	Qualification to Europa League group stage (Note: Since the winners of the EFL Cup and the FA Cup, Manchester City, qualified for the Champions League, the spot given to the FA Cup winners (Europa League group stage) was passed to the sixth-placed team and the spot given to the League Cup winners (Europa League second qualifying round) was passed to the seventh-placed team.)

Source: Premier League
Rules for classification: 1) Points; 2) Goal difference; 3) Goals scored; 4) Play-offs (only if needed to decide champion, teams for relegation or teams for UEFA competitions).
(C) Champions

==== Results by matchday ====
Matchday	1	2	3	4	5	6	7	8	9	10	11	12	13	14	15	16	17	18	19	20	21	22	23	24	25	26	27	28	29	30	31	32	33	34	35	36	37	38
Ground	A	H	A	H	H	A	H	A	H	A	H	H	A	H	A	H	A	H	A	A	H	H	A	A	H	A	H	A	H	A	A	H	H	A	H	A	H	A
Result	W	W	W	W	W	D	D	W	D	W	W	D	L	W	L	W	W	L	W	W	D	W	L	L	W	L	W	W	D	L	W	W	W	L	D	D	W	D
Position	2	3	3	2	1	3	3	2	3	3	2	3	4	3	4	4	4	4	4	4	4	4	4	5	4	6	4	5	4	5	5	5	4	5	4	4	3	3

Source: Premier League
A = Away; H = Home; W = Win; D = Draw; L = Loss; P = Postponed

==== Score overview ====
Win Draw Loss

Opposition	Home score	Away score	Aggregate score	Double
Arsenal	3–2	0–2	3–4	No
Bournemouth	2–0	0–4	2–4	No
Brighton & Hove Albion	3–0	2–1	5–1	Yes
Burnley	2–2	4–0	6–2	No
Cardiff City	4–1	2–1	6–2	Yes
Crystal Palace	3–1	1–0	4–1	Yes
Everton	0–0	0–2	0–2	No
Fulham	2–0	2–1	4–1	Yes
Huddersfield Town	5–0	3–0	8–0	Yes
Leicester City	0–1	0–0	0–1	No
Liverpool	1–1	0–2	1–3	No
Manchester City	2–0	0–6	2–6	No
Manchester United	2–2	1–1	3–3	No
Newcastle United	2–1	2–1	4–2	Yes
Southampton	0–0	3–0	3–0	No
Tottenham Hotspur	2–0	1–3	3–3	No
Watford	3–0	2–1	5–1	Yes
West Ham United	0–0	2–0	2–0	No
Wolverhampton Wanderers	1–1	1–2	2–3	No

==== Matches ====
11 August 2018 1	Huddersfield Town	0–3	Chelsea	Huddersfield
15:00 BST	Schindler (yellow card) 44'; Kongolo (yellow card) 83'	Report	Kanté 34'; Jorginho 45' (pen.); David Luiz (yellow card) 69'; Pedro 80'	Stadium: John Smith's Stadium; Attendance: 24,121; Referee: Chris Kavanagh

18 August 2018 2	Chelsea	3–2	Arsenal	London
17:30 BST	Pedro 9'; Morata 20'; Alonso 81'	Report	Xhaka (yellow card) 27'; Mkhitaryan 37'; Iwobi 41'; Mustafi (yellow card) 77'	Stadium: Stamford Bridge; Attendance: 40,491; Referee: Martin Atkinson

26 August 2018 3	Newcastle United	1–2	Chelsea	Newcastle
16:00 BST	Schär (yellow card) 65'; Fernández (yellow card) 68'; Ritchie (yellow card) 70'; Joselu 83'	Report	Kovačić (yellow card) 40'; Hazard 76' (pen.); Yedlin 87' (o.g.)	Stadium: St James' Park; Attendance: 51,791; Referee: Paul Tierney

1 September 2018 4	Chelsea	2–0	Bournemouth	London
15:00 BST	Alonso (yellow card) 33'; Kanté (yellow card) 55'; Pedro 72'; Hazard 85'	Report	Gosling (yellow card) 20'; Lerma (yellow card) 70'	Stadium: Stamford Bridge; Attendance: 40,178; Referee: Lee Mason

15 September 2018 5	Chelsea	4–1	Cardiff City	London
15:00 BST	Hazard 37', 44', 80' (pen.); Willian 83'	Report	Bamba 16'	Stadium: Stamford Bridge; Attendance: 40,499; Referee: Jon Moss

23 September 2018 6	West Ham United	0–0	Chelsea	London
13:30 BST	Felipe Anderson (yellow card) 52'; Snodgrass (yellow card) 90+3'	Report	Kanté (yellow card) 50'	Stadium: London Stadium; Attendance: 56,875; Referee: Mike Dean

29 September 2018 7	Chelsea	1–1	Liverpool	London
17:30 BST	Hazard 25'	Report	Mané (yellow card) 39'; Milner (yellow card) 77'; Sturridge 89'	Stadium: Stamford Bridge; Attendance: 40,625; Referee: Andre Marriner

7 October 2018 8	Southampton	0–3	Chelsea	Southampton
14:15 BST	Bertrand (yellow card) 45+2'; Lemina (yellow card) 54'; Cédric (yellow card) 59'; Romeu (yellow card) 61'; Højbjerg (yellow card) 66'; Ings (yellow card) 90'	Report	Hazard 30'; Barkley 57'; Morata 90+3'	Stadium: St Mary's Stadium; Attendance: 27,077; Referee: Craig Pawson

20 October 2018 9	Chelsea	2–2	Manchester United	London
12:30 BST	Rüdiger 21', (yellow card) 30'; Hazard (yellow card) 34'; Barkley 90+6'	Report	Matić (yellow card) 13'; Young (yellow card) 27'; Martial 55', 73'; Mata (yellow card) 67'; Sánchez (yellow card) 90+4'; Pereira (yellow card) 90+5'	Stadium: Stamford Bridge; Attendance: 40,721; Referee: Mike Dean

28 October 2018 10	Burnley	0–4	Chelsea	Burnley
13:30 GMT	Tarkowski (yellow card) 43'; Hendrick (yellow card) 48'; Brady (yellow card) 61'; Guðmundsson (yellow card) 64'	Report	Morata 22', (yellow card) 43'; Willian (yellow card) 45', (goal) 62'; Barkley 57'; Loftus-Cheek 90+2'	Stadium: Turf Moor; Attendance: 21,430; Referee: Craig Pawson

4 November 2018 11	Chelsea	3–1	Crystal Palace	London
16:00 GMT	Morata 32', 65'; Pedro 70'	Report	Townsend 53'; Milivojević (yellow card) 86'	Stadium: Stamford Bridge; Attendance: 40,407; Referee: Michael Oliver

11 November 2018 12	Chelsea	0–0	Everton	London
14:15 GMT	Jorginho (yellow card) 28'; Kanté (yellow card) 33'; Rüdiger (yellow card) 45+2'; Morata (yellow card) 87'	Report	Mina (yellow card) 22'; Bernard (yellow card) 45+2'; Pickford (yellow card) 73'	Stadium: Stamford Bridge; Attendance: 40,345; Referee: Kevin Friend

24 November 2018 13	Tottenham Hotspur	3–1	Chelsea	London
17:30 GMT	Alli 8'; Kane 16'; Son 54'	Report	Rüdiger (yellow card) 19'; Hazard (yellow card) 45+3'; Jorginho (yellow card) 72'; Giroud 85'	Stadium: Wembley Stadium; Attendance: 55,465; Referee: Martin Atkinson

2 December 2018 14	Chelsea	2–0	Fulham	London
12:00 GMT	Pedro 4'; Azpilicueta (yellow card) 69'; Loftus-Cheek 82'; Morata (yellow card) 83'	Report	Odoi (yellow card) 54'	Stadium: Stamford Bridge; Attendance: 40,551; Referee: Craig Pawson

5 December 2018 15	Wolverhampton Wanderers	2–1	Chelsea	Wolverhampton
19:45 GMT	Saïss (yellow card) 37'; Moutinho (yellow card) 54'; Jiménez 59'; Coady (yellow card) 61'; Jota 63'; Vinagre (yellow card) 68'	Report	Loftus-Cheek 18'; Fàbregas (yellow card) 64'; Giroud (yellow card) 86'; Alonso (yellow card) 90+1'; Christensen (yellow card) 90+4'	Stadium: Molineux Stadium; Attendance: 31,300; Referee: Jon Moss

8 December 2018 16	Chelsea	2–0	Manchester City	London
17:30 GMT	Kanté 45'; Jorginho (yellow card) 63'; David Luiz 78'; Pedro (yellow card) 80'	Report		Stadium: Stamford Bridge; Attendance: 40,571; Referee: Michael Oliver

16 December 2018 17	Brighton & Hove Albion	1–2	Chelsea	Falmer
13:30 GMT	Dunk (yellow card) 55'; March 66'; Andone (yellow card) 69'	Report	Pedro 17'; Hazard 33'; Alonso (yellow card) 87'; Arrizabalaga (yellow card) 90'	Stadium: Amex Stadium; Attendance: 30,645; Referee: Stuart Attwell

22 December 2018 18	Chelsea	0–1	Leicester City	London
15:00 GMT		Report	Ndidi (yellow card) 31'; Vardy 51'; Mendy (yellow card) 81'	Stadium: Stamford Bridge; Attendance: 40,558; Referee: Lee Probert

26 December 2018 19	Watford	1–2	Chelsea	Watford
19:30 GMT	Pereyra 45+3'; Foster (yellow card) 58'	Report	Hazard 45+1', 58' (pen.)	Stadium: Vicarage Road; Attendance: 20,415; Referee: Martin Atkinson

30 December 2018 20	Crystal Palace	0–1	Chelsea	London
12:00 GMT		Report	Alonso (yellow card) 10'; Kanté 51'	Stadium: Selhurst Park; Attendance: 25,781; Referee: Craig Pawson

2 January 2019 21	Chelsea	0–0	Southampton	London
19:45 GMT	Rüdiger (yellow card) 74'	Report	Bednarek (yellow card) 30'; Romeu (yellow card) 79'	Stadium: Stamford Bridge; Attendance: 40,668; Referee: Jon Moss

12 January 2019 22	Chelsea	2–1	Newcastle United	London
17:30 GMT	Pedro 9'; Willian 57'; Jorginho (yellow card) 63'	Report	Ritchie (yellow card) 24'; Clark 40'	Stadium: Stamford Bridge; Attendance: 40,491; Referee: Chris Kavanagh

19 January 2019 23	Arsenal	2–0	Chelsea	London
17:30 GMT	Lacazette 14'; Koscielny 39'	Report	David Luiz (yellow card) 37'; Barkley (yellow card) 90+5'	Stadium: Emirates Stadium; Attendance: 59,979; Referee: Anthony Taylor

30 January 2019 24	Bournemouth	4–0	Chelsea	Bournemouth
19:45 GMT	King 47', 74'; Brooks 63'; Surman (yellow card) 72'; Daniels 90+5'	Report		Stadium: Vitality Stadium; Attendance: 10,227; Referee: Roger East

2 February 2019 25	Chelsea	5–0	Huddersfield Town	London
15:00 GMT	Higuaín 16', 69'; Hazard 45+1' (pen.), 66'; David Luiz 86'	Report		Stadium: Stamford Bridge; Attendance: 40,626; Referee: Paul Tierney

10 February 2019 26	Manchester City	6–0	Chelsea	Manchester
16:00 GMT	Sterling 4', 80'; Agüero 13', 19', 56' (pen.); Gündoğan 25', (yellow card) 77'	Report	Jorginho (yellow card) 60'; Alonso (yellow card) 69'	Stadium: Etihad Stadium; Attendance: 54,452; Referee: Mike Dean

27 February 2019 28	Chelsea	2–0	Tottenham Hotspur	London
20:00 GMT	Pedro 57'; Trippier 84' (o.g.); David Luiz (yellow card) 90+4'	Report	Kane (yellow card) 90+4'	Stadium: Stamford Bridge; Attendance: 40,542; Referee: Andre Marriner

3 March 2019 29	Fulham	1–2	Chelsea	London
14:05 GMT	Chambers (yellow card) 22', (goal) 27'; McDonald (yellow card) 51'	Report	Higuaín 20'; Jorginho 31', (yellow card) 61'	Stadium: Craven Cottage; Attendance: 24,900; Referee: Graham Scott

10 March 2019 30	Chelsea	1–1	Wolverhampton Wanderers	London
14:05 GMT	Rüdiger (yellow card) 78'; Hazard 90+2'	Report	Doherty (yellow card) 37'; Jiménez 56'; Saïss (yellow card) 66'; Boly (yellow card) 75'; Jota (yellow card) 80'	Stadium: Stamford Bridge; Attendance: 40,692; Referee: Michael Oliver

17 March 2019 31	Everton	2–0	Chelsea	Liverpool
16:30 GMT	Richarlison 49'; Gomes (yellow card) 59'; Sigurðsson 72'	Report	Alonso (yellow card) 36'; Rüdiger (yellow card) 61'	Stadium: Goodison Park; Attendance: 39,356; Referee: Anthony Taylor

31 March 2019 32	Cardiff City	1–2	Chelsea	Cardiff
14:05 BST	Camarasa 46'; Arter (yellow card) 54'; Gunnarsson (yellow card) 86'	Report	Jorginho (yellow card) 26'; Azpilicueta (yellow card) 61', (goal) 84'; Rüdiger (yellow card) 87'; Loftus-Cheek 90+1'	Stadium: Cardiff City Stadium; Attendance: 32,657; Referee: Craig Pawson

3 April 2019 27	Chelsea	3–0	Brighton & Hove Albion	London
19:45 BST	Giroud 38'; Hazard 60'; Loftus-Cheek 63'	Report		Stadium: Stamford Bridge; Attendance: 38,593; Referee: Graham Scott

8 April 2019 33	Chelsea	2–0	West Ham United	London
20:00 BST	Hazard 24', 90'; Azpilicueta (yellow card) 82'; Arrizabalaga (yellow card) 84'	Report	Ogbonna (yellow card) 11'	Stadium: Stamford Bridge; Attendance: 40,537; Referee: Chris Kavanagh

14 April 2019 34	Liverpool	2–0	Chelsea	Liverpool
16:30 BST	Mané 51'; Salah 53'	Report	Azpilicueta (yellow card) 44'	Stadium: Anfield; Attendance: 53,279; Referee: Michael Oliver

22 April 2019 35	Chelsea	2–2	Burnley	London
20:00 BST	Kanté 12'; Higuaín 14'; Pedro (yellow card) 90+2'; Kovačić (yellow card) 90+4'	Report	Hendrick 8'; Barnes 24'; Heaton (yellow card) 32'	Stadium: Stamford Bridge; Attendance: 40,642; Referee: Kevin Friend

28 April 2019 36	Manchester United	1–1	Chelsea	Manchester
16:30 BST	Mata 11'; Herrera (yellow card) 43'; Rojo (yellow card) 80'; Young (yellow card) 89'	Report	Alonso 43'; Willian (yellow card) 52'; Kovačić (yellow card) 54'	Stadium: Old Trafford; Attendance: 74,526; Referee: Martin Atkinson

5 May 2019 37	Chelsea	3–0	Watford	London
14:00 BST	Loftus-Cheek 48'; David Luiz 51'; Higuaín 75'	Report	Doucouré (yellow card) 90'	Stadium: Stamford Bridge; Attendance: 40,650; Referee: Paul Tierney

12 May 2019 38	Leicester City	0–0	Chelsea	Leicester
15:00 BST		Report	Jorginho (yellow card) 30'	Stadium: King Power Stadium; Attendance: 32,140; Referee: Anthony Taylor

=== FA Cup ===
5 January 2019 Third round	Chelsea	2–0	Nottingham Forest	London
15:00 GMT	Barkley (yellow card) 41'; Morata 49', 59'	Report	Colback (yellow card) 67'	Stadium: Stamford Bridge; Attendance: 40,544; Referee: Andrew Madley

27 January 2019 Fourth round	Chelsea	3–0	Sheffield Wednesday	London
18:00 GMT	Willian 26' (pen.), 83'; Hudson-Odoi 64'	Report	Fox (yellow card) 38'	Stadium: Stamford Bridge; Attendance: 37,433; Referee: Andre Marriner

18 February 2019 Fifth round	Chelsea	0–2	Manchester United	London
19:30 GMT	Rüdiger (yellow card) 60'; Kanté (yellow card) 65'	Report	Matić (yellow card) 15'; Young (yellow card) 21'; Herrera 31'; Pogba 45'	Stadium: Stamford Bridge; Attendance: 40,562; Referee: Kevin Friend

=== EFL Cup ===
26 September 2018 Third round	Liverpool	1–2	Chelsea	Liverpool
19:45 BST	Milner (yellow card) 21'; Matip (yellow card) 26'; Fabinho (yellow card) 56'; Sturridge 58'; Keïta (yellow card) 78'; Henderson (yellow card) 90'	Report	Kovačić (yellow card) 50'; Emerson 79'; Hazard 85'; Moses (yellow card) 90+1'; Morata (yellow card) 90+5'	Stadium: Anfield; Attendance: 45,503; Referee: Kevin Friend

31 October 2018 Fourth round	Chelsea	3–2	Derby County	London
19:45 GMT	Tomori 5' (o.g.); Keogh 21' (o.g.); Fàbregas 41'; Emerson (yellow card) 84'	Report	Marriott 9'; Waghorn 27'; Keogh (yellow card) 90+3'	Stadium: Stamford Bridge; Attendance: 39,564; Referee: Jon Moss

19 December 2018 Quarter-finals	Chelsea	1–0	Bournemouth	London
19:45 GMT	Fàbregas (yellow card) 60'; Hazard 84'	Report	Stanislas (yellow card) 57'; Simpson (yellow card) 65'	Stadium: Stamford Bridge; Attendance: 40,432; Referee: Anthony Taylor

8 January 2019 Semi-finals first leg	Tottenham Hotspur	1–0	Chelsea	London
20:00 GMT	Kane 26' (pen.); Winks (yellow card) 29'; Sánchez (yellow card) 59'; Lamela (yellow card) 82'	Report	Arrizabalaga (yellow card) 25'	Stadium: Wembley Stadium; Attendance: 44,371; Referee: Michael Oliver

24 January 2019 Semi-finals second leg	Chelsea	2–1 (2–2 agg.) (4–2 p)	Tottenham Hotspur	London
19:45 GMT	Kanté 27', (yellow card) 56'; Hazard 38'; Jorginho (yellow card) 53'; Azpilicueta (yellow card) 66'	Report	Llorente 50'; Sissoko (yellow card) 73'	Stadium: Stamford Bridge; Attendance: 38,610; Referee: Martin Atkinson
	Penalties
	Willian (penalty scored); Azpilicueta (penalty scored); Jorginho (penalty scored); David Luiz (penalty scored)		(penalty scored) Eriksen; (penalty scored) Lamela; (penalty missed) Dier; (penalty missed) Lucas

24 February 2019 Final	Chelsea	0–0 (a.e.t.) (3–4 p)	Manchester City	London
16:30 GMT	David Luiz (yellow card) 30'; Rüdiger (yellow card) 72'; Jorginho (yellow card) 88'	Report	Fernandinho (yellow card) 58'; Otamendi (yellow card) 90+1'	Stadium: Wembley Stadium; Attendance: 81,775; Referee: Jon Moss
	Penalties
	Jorginho (penalty missed); Azpilicueta (penalty scored); Emerson (penalty scored); David Luiz (penalty missed); Hazard (penalty scored)		(penalty scored) Gündoğan; (penalty scored) Agüero; (penalty missed) Sané; (penalty scored) B. Silva; (penalty scored) Sterling

=== FA Community Shield ===
5 August 2018	Chelsea	0–2	Manchester City	London
15:00 BST		Report	Agüero 13', 58'	Stadium: Wembley Stadium; Attendance: 72,724; Referee: Jon Moss

=== UEFA Europa League ===
==== Group stage ====
Tables

Group L
Pos	Team	Pld	W	D	L	GF	GA	GD	Pts	Qualification
1	(England) Chelsea	6	5	1	0	12	3	+9	16	Advance to knockout phase
2	(Belarus) BATE Borisov	6	3	0	3	9	9	0	9	Advance to knockout phase
3	(Hungary) Vidi	6	2	1	3	5	7	−2	7	
4	(Greece) PAOK	6	1	0	5	5	12	−7	3	

Source: UEFA
Rules for classification: Group stage tiebreakers

Matches

20 September 2018 1	PAOK (Greece)	0–1	(England) Chelsea	Thessaloniki, Greece
19:55 EEST	Wernbloom (yellow card) 88'; Warda (yellow card) 90+2'; El Kaddouri (yellow card) 90+3'	Report	Willian 7'; Barkley (yellow card) 90'; Rüdiger (yellow card) 90+1'	Stadium: Toumba Stadium; Attendance: 24,310; Referee: Alberto Undiano Mallenco (Spain)

4 October 2018 2	Chelsea (England)	1–0	(Hungary) MOL Vidi	London, England
20:00 BST	Morata (yellow card) 66', (goal) 70'	Report	Nego (yellow card) 14'; Huszti (yellow card) 44'; Milanov (yellow card) 56'	Stadium: Stamford Bridge; Attendance: 39,925; Referee: Miroslav Zelinka (Czech Republic)

25 October 2018 3	Chelsea (England)	3–1	(Belarus) BATE Borisov	London, England
20:00 BST	Loftus-Cheek 2', 8', 54'	Report	Hleb (yellow card) 34'; Rios 80'	Stadium: Stamford Bridge; Attendance: 39,799; Referee: Paolo Mazzoleni (Italy)

8 November 2018 4	BATE Borisov (Belarus)	0–1	(England) Chelsea	Barysaw, Belarus
20:55 FET		Report	Giroud 53'	Stadium: Borisov Arena; Attendance: 13,141; Referee: Nikola Dabanović (Montenegro)

29 November 2018 5	Chelsea (England)	4–0	(Greece) PAOK	London, England
20:00 GMT	Giroud 27', 37'; Cahill (yellow card) 54'; Hudson-Odoi 60'; Morata 78'	Report	Khacheridi (red card) 7'; Wernbloom (yellow card) 50'; Pelkas (yellow card) 80'	Stadium: Stamford Bridge; Attendance: 33,933; Referee: Kristo Tohver (Estonia)

13 December 2018 6	MOL Vidi (Hungary)	2–2	(England) Chelsea	Budapest, Hungary
18:55 CET	Ampadu 32' (o.g.); Nego 56', (yellow card) 76'; Juhász (yellow card) 66'; Huszti (yellow card) 69'; Vinícius (yellow card) 74'	Report	Willian 30'; Giroud 75'; Loftus-Cheek (yellow card) 79'	Stadium: Groupama Arena; Attendance: 19,242; Referee: Aleksandar Stavrev (North Macedonia)

==== Knockout phase ====
===== Round of 32 =====
14 February 2019 First leg	Malmö FF (Sweden)	1–2	(England) Chelsea	Malmö, Sweden
21:00 CET	Christiansen 80'	Report	Barkley 30'; Giroud 58'	Stadium: Malmö New Stadion; Attendance: 20,312; Referee: Aleksei Kulbakov (Belarus)

21 February 2019 Second leg	Chelsea (England)	3–0 (5–1 agg.)	(Sweden) Malmö FF	London, England
20:00 GMT	Barkley (yellow card) 18', (goal) 74'; Giroud 55'; Hudson-Odoi 84'	Report	Safari (yellow card) 31'; Rosenberg (yellow card) 44'; Christiansen (yellow card) 51'; Bengtsson (yellow card) 52' (yellow-red card) 73'	Stadium: Stamford Bridge; Attendance: 39,813; Referee: Orel Grinfeld (Israel)

===== Round of 16 =====
7 March 2019 First leg	Chelsea (England)	3–0	(Ukraine) Dynamo Kyiv	London, England
20:00 GMT	Pedro 17'; Willian 65'; Hudson-Odoi 90'	Report	Shepelyev (yellow card) 9'; Buyalskyi (yellow card) 42'	Stadium: Stamford Bridge; Attendance: 37,280; Referee: Slavko Vinčić (Slovenia)

14 March 2019 Second leg	Dynamo Kyiv (Ukraine)	0–5 (0–8 agg.)	(England) Chelsea	Kyiv, Ukraine
19:55 EET	Mykolenko (yellow card) 61'	Report	Giroud 5', 33', 59'; Alonso 45+1'; Azpilicueta (yellow card) 73'; Hudson-Odoi 78'	Stadium: Olimpiyskiy National Sports Complex; Attendance: 64,830; Referee: Tobias Stieler (Germany)

===== Quarter-finals =====
11 April 2019 First leg	Slavia Prague (Czech Republic)	0–1	(England) Chelsea	Prague, Czech Republic
21:00 CEST	Coufal (yellow card) 83'	Report	Alonso 86'	Stadium: Eden Arena; Attendance: 17,484; Referee: Felix Zwayer (Germany)

18 April 2019 Second leg	Chelsea (England)	4–3 (5–3 agg.)	(Czech Republic) Slavia Prague	London, England
20:00 BST	Pedro 5', 27'; Deli 10' (o.g.); Giroud 17'; Kanté (yellow card) 34'; Emerson (yellow card) 75'; Arrizabalaga (yellow card) 83'; David Luiz (yellow card) 90'	Report	Souček 26', (yellow card) 53'; Ševčík 51', 55'; Kúdela (yellow card) 73'	Stadium: Stamford Bridge; Attendance: 38,326; Referee: Damir Skomina (Slovenia)

===== Semi-finals =====
2 May 2019 First leg	Eintracht Frankfurt (Germany)	1–1	(England) Chelsea	Frankfurt, Germany
21:00 CEST	Jović 23'; Hasebe (yellow card) 58'; Fernandes (yellow card) 61'	Report	Christensen (yellow card) 19'; Pedro 45'	Stadium: Commerzbank-Arena; Attendance: 48,000; Referee: Carlos del Cerro Grande (Spain)

9 May 2019 Second leg	Chelsea (England)	1–1 (a.e.t.) (2–2 agg.) (4–3 p)	(Germany) Eintracht Frankfurt	London, England
20:00 BST	Loftus-Cheek 28'; Kovačić (yellow card) 52'; Azpilicueta (yellow card) 83'; Zappacosta (yellow card) 120+1'	Report	Falette (yellow card) 38'; Rode (yellow card) 40'; Jović 49'; Abraham (yellow card) 90+1'; De Guzmán (yellow card) 90+1'	Stadium: Stamford Bridge; Attendance: 36,070; Referee: Ovidiu Hațegan (Romania)
	Penalties
	Barkley (penalty scored); Azpilicueta (penalty missed); Jorginho (penalty scored); David Luiz (penalty scored); Hazard (penalty scored)		(penalty scored) Haller; (penalty scored) Jović; (penalty scored) De Guzmán; (penalty missed) Hinteregger; (penalty missed) Paciência

===== Final =====
29 May 2019 Final	Chelsea (England)	4–1	(England) Arsenal	Baku, Azerbaijan
23:00 AZT	Giroud 49'; Pedro (yellow card) 56', (goal) 60'; Hazard 65' (pen.), 72'; Christensen (yellow card) 68'	Report	Iwobi 69'	Stadium: Baku Olympic Stadium; Attendance: 51,370; Referee: Gianluca Rocchi (Italy)

== Statistics ==
=== Appearances and goals ===
No.	Pos.	Player	Premier League		FA Cup		EFL Cup		FA Community Shield		UEFA Europa League		Total	
No.	Pos.	Player	Apps	Goals	Apps	Goals	Apps	Goals	Apps	Goals	Apps	Goals	Apps	Goals
1	GK	(Spain) Kepa Arrizabalaga	36	0	1	0	4	0	0	0	13	0	54	0
2	DF	(Germany) Antonio Rüdiger	33	1	2	0	4	0	1	0	4	0	44	1
3	DF	(Spain) Marcos Alonso	31	2	2	0	1	0	1	0	4	2	39	4
5	MF	(Italy) Jorginho	37	2	1 (1)	0	3	0	1	0	8 (3)	0	50 (4)	2
6	MF	(England) Danny Drinkwater	0	0	0	0	0	0	0 (1)	0	0	0	0 (1)	0
7	MF	(France) N'Golo Kanté	36	4	1 (1)	0	4 (1)	1	0	0	6 (4)	0	47 (6)	5
8	MF	(England) Ross Barkley	13 (14)	3	2 (1)	0	5	0	1	0	9 (3)	2	30 (18)	5
9	FW	(Argentina) Gonzalo Higuaín	13 (1)	5	2	0	0 (1)	0	0	0	0 (1)	0	15 (3)	5
10	MF	(Belgium) Eden Hazard	32 (5)	16	1 (1)	0	3 (2)	3	0	0	4 (4)	2	40 (12)	21
11	MF	(Spain) Pedro	21 (10)	8	1	0	2 (3)	0	1	0	11 (3)	5	36 (16)	13
12	MF	(England) Ruben Loftus-Cheek	6 (18)	6	1 (1)	0	2 (1)	0	0	0	8 (3)	4	17 (23)	10
13	GK	(Argentina) Willy Caballero	2	0	2	0	2	0	1	0	2	0	9	0
17	MF	(Croatia) Mateo Kovačić	21 (11)	0	2	0	3 (2)	0	0	0	10 (2)	0	36 (15)	0
18	FW	(France) Olivier Giroud	7 (20)	2	0 (1)	0	2 (1)	0	0	0	12 (2)	11	21 (24)	13
20	MF	(England) Callum Hudson-Odoi	4 (6)	0	2	1	1 (1)	0	1	0	4 (5)	4	12 (12)	5
21	DF	(Italy) Davide Zappacosta	1 (3)	0	1 (1)	0	1	0	0	0	8 (2)	0	11 (6)	0
22	MF	(Brazil) Willian	26 (6)	3	1 (1)	2	5 (1)	0	0 (1)	0	11 (4)	3	43 (13)	8
24	DF	(England) Gary Cahill	0 (2)	0	0	0	2	0	0	0	4	0	6 (2)	0
27	DF	(Denmark) Andreas Christensen	6 (2)	0	2	0	4	0	0	0	15	0	27 (2)	0
28	DF	(Spain) César Azpilicueta	38	1	2 (1)	0	5 (1)	0	1	0	7 (2)	0	53 (4)	1
30	DF	(Brazil) David Luiz	36	3	2	0	2 (3)	0	1	0	6	0	47 (3)	3
31	GK	(England) Robert Green	0	0	0	0	0	0	0	0	0	0	0	0
33	DF	(Italy) Emerson	7 (3)	0	1	0	5	1	0	0	11	0	24 (3)	1
44	DF	(Wales) Ethan Ampadu	0	0	2	0	0	0	0	0	1 (2)	0	3 (2)	0
51	MF	(England) Conor Gallagher	0	0	0	0	0	0	0	0	0	0	0	0
52	GK	(England) Jamie Cumming	0	0	0	0	0	0	0	0	0	0	0	0
53	DF	(England) Marc Guehi	0	0	0	0	0	0	0	0	0	0	0	0
55	MF	(England) George McEachran	0	0	0	0	0	0	0	0	0	0	0	0
59	GK	(Poland) Marcin Bułka	0	0	0	0	0	0	0	0	0	0	0	0
Players have left the club
19	FW	(England) Tammy Abraham	0	0	0	0	0	0	0 (1)	0	0	0	0 (1)	0
4	MF	(Spain) Cesc Fàbregas	1 (5)	0	1	0	3	1	1	0	4 (1)	0	10 (6)	1
15	MF	(Nigeria) Victor Moses	0 (2)	0	0	0	1	0	0 (1)	0	0 (2)	0	1 (5)	0
29	FW	(Spain) Álvaro Morata	11 (5)	5	1	2	2	0	1	0	3 (1)	2	18 (6)	9
34	MF	(Brazil) Lucas Piazon	0	0	0	0	0	0	0	0	0	0	0	0

Last updated: 30 June 2019.
Source: Competitions

=== Top scorers ===
Rank	No.	Pos.	Player	Premier League	FA Cup	EFL Cup	FA Community Shield	UEFA Europa League	Total
1	10	MF	(Belgium) Eden Hazard	16	0	3	0	2	21
2	11	MF	(Spain) Pedro	8	0	0	0	5	13
2	18	FW	(France) Olivier Giroud	2	0	0	0	11	13
4	12	MF	(England) Ruben Loftus-Cheek	6	0	0	0	4	10
5	29	FW	(Spain) Álvaro Morata	5	2	0	0	2	9
6	22	MF	(Brazil) Willian	3	2	0	0	3	8
7	7	MF	(France) N'Golo Kanté	4	0	1	0	0	5
7	8	MF	(England) Ross Barkley	3	0	0	0	2	5
7	9	FW	(Argentina) Gonzalo Higuaín	5	0	0	0	0	5
7	20	MF	(England) Callum Hudson-Odoi	0	1	0	0	4	5
11	3	DF	(Spain) Marcos Alonso	2	0	0	0	2	4
12	30	DF	(Brazil) David Luiz	3	0	0	0	0	3
13	5	MF	(Italy) Jorginho	2	0	0	0	0	2
14	2	DF	(Germany) Antonio Rüdiger	1	0	0	0	0	1
14	4	MF	(Spain) Cesc Fàbregas	0	0	1	0	0	1
14	28	DF	(Spain) César Azpilicueta	1	0	0	0	0	1
14	33	DF	(Italy) Emerson	0	0	1	0	0	1
Own goals				2	0	2	0	1	5
Total				63	5	8	0	36	112

Last updated: 30 June 2019.
Source: Competitions

=== Top assists ===
Rank	No.	Pos.	Player	Premier League	FA Cup	EFL Cup	FA Community Shield	UEFA Europa League	Total
1	10	MF	(Belgium) Eden Hazard	15	0	0	0	2	17
2	22	MF	(Brazil) Willian	6	0	0	0	7	13
3	18	FW	(France) Olivier Giroud	4	1	0	0	4	9
4	28	DF	(Spain) César Azpilicueta	5	0	2	0	0	7
5	8	MF	(England) Ross Barkley	5	0	0	0	1	6
6	3	DF	(Spain) Marcos Alonso	4	0	0	0	1	5
6	11	MF	(Spain) Pedro	2	0	0	0	3	5
6	12	MF	(England) Ruben Loftus-Cheek	2	0	0	0	3	5
6	20	MF	(England) Callum Hudson-Odoi	1	2	0	0	2	5
10	7	MF	(France) N'Golo Kanté	4	0	0	0	0	4
11	4	MF	(Spain) Cesc Fàbregas	0	0	0	0	2	2
11	17	MF	(Croatia) Mateo Kovačić	2	0	0	0	0	2
11	21	DF	(Italy) Davide Zappacosta	0	0	1	0	1	2
11	30	DF	(Brazil) David Luiz	2	0	0	0	0	2
11	33	DF	(Italy) Emerson	0	0	0	0	2	2
16	27	DF	(Denmark) Andreas Christensen	0	1	0	0	0	1
Total				52	4	3	0	28	87

Last updated: 30 June 2019.
Source: Competitions

=== Clean sheets ===
Rank	No.	Pos.	Player	Premier League	FA Cup	EFL Cup	FA Community Shield	UEFA Europa League	Total
1	1	GK	(Spain) Kepa Arrizabalaga	14	0	2	0	7	23
2	13	GK	(Argentina) Willy Caballero	2	2	0	0	1	5
Total				16	2	2	0	8	28

Last updated: 30 June 2019.
Source: Competitions

=== Discipline ===
No.	Pos.	Player	Premier League			FA Cup			EFL Cup			FA Community Shield			UEFA Europa League			Total		
No.	Pos.	Player	Yellow card	(yellow card) (yellow-red card)	Red card	Yellow card	(yellow card) (yellow-red card)	Red card	Yellow card	(yellow card) (yellow-red card)	Red card	Yellow card	(yellow card) (yellow-red card)	Red card	Yellow card	(yellow card) (yellow-red card)	Red card	Yellow card	(yellow card) (yellow-red card)	Red card
1	GK	(Spain) Kepa Arrizabalaga	2	0	0	0	0	0	1	0	0	0	0	0	1	0	0	4	0	0
2	DF	(Germany) Antonio Rüdiger	7	0	0	1	0	0	1	0	0	0	0	0	1	0	0	10	0	0
3	DF	(Spain) Marcos Alonso	6	0	0	0	0	0	0	0	0	0	0	0	0	0	0	6	0	0
4	MF	(Spain) Cesc Fàbregas	1	0	0	0	0	0	1	0	0	0	0	0	0	0	0	2	0	0
5	MF	(Italy) Jorginho	8	0	0	0	0	0	2	0	0	0	0	0	0	0	0	10	0	0
7	MF	(France) N'Golo Kanté	3	0	0	1	0	0	1	0	0	0	0	0	1	0	0	6	0	0
8	MF	(England) Ross Barkley	1	0	0	1	0	0	0	0	0	0	0	0	2	0	0	4	0	0
10	MF	(Belgium) Eden Hazard	2	0	0	0	0	0	0	0	0	0	0	0	0	0	0	2	0	0
11	MF	(Spain) Pedro	2	0	0	0	0	0	0	0	0	0	0	0	1	0	0	3	0	0
12	MF	(England) Ruben Loftus-Cheek	0	0	0	0	0	0	0	0	0	0	0	0	1	0	0	1	0	0
15	MF	(Nigeria) Victor Moses	0	0	0	0	0	0	1	0	0	0	0	0	0	0	0	1	0	0
17	MF	(Croatia) Mateo Kovačić	3	0	0	0	0	0	1	0	0	0	0	0	1	0	0	5	0	0
18	FW	(France) Olivier Giroud	1	0	0	0	0	0	0	0	0	0	0	0	0	0	0	1	0	0
21	DF	(Italy) Davide Zappacosta	0	0	0	0	0	0	0	0	0	0	0	0	1	0	0	1	0	0
22	MF	(Brazil) Willian	2	0	0	0	0	0	0	0	0	0	0	0	0	0	0	2	0	0
24	DF	(England) Gary Cahill	0	0	0	0	0	0	0	0	0	0	0	0	1	0	0	1	0	0
27	DF	(Denmark) Andreas Christensen	1	0	0	0	0	0	0	0	0	0	0	0	2	0	0	3	0	0
28	DF	(Spain) César Azpilicueta	4	0	0	0	0	0	1	0	0	0	0	0	2	0	0	7	0	0
29	FW	(Spain) Álvaro Morata	3	0	0	0	0	0	1	0	0	0	0	0	1	0	0	5	0	0
30	DF	(Brazil) David Luiz	3	0	0	0	0	0	1	0	0	0	0	0	1	0	0	5	0	0
33	DF	(Italy) Emerson	0	0	0	0	0	0	1	0	0	0	0	0	1	0	0	2	0	0
Total			49	0	0	3	0	0	12	0	0	0	0	0	17	0	0	81	0	0

Last updated: 30 June 2019.
Source: Competitions

=== Summary ===
Competition	P	W	D	L	GF	GA	CS	Yellow card	(yellow card) (yellow-red card)	Red card
Premier League	38	21	9	8	63	39	16	49	0	0
FA Cup	3	2	0	1	5	2	2	3	0	0
EFL Cup	6	4	1	1	8	5	2	12	0	0
FA Community Shield	1	0	0	1	0	2	0	0	0	0
UEFA Europa League	15	12	3	0	36	10	8	17	0	0
Total	63	39	13	11	112	58	28	81	0	0

Last updated: 30 June 2019.
Source: Competitions

== Awards ==
No.	Pos.	Player	Award	Source
10	MF	(Belgium) Eden Hazard	Premier League Player of the Month (September)	
10	MF	(Belgium) Eden Hazard	Premier League Goal of the Month (April)	
10	MF	(Belgium) Eden Hazard	Chelsea Player of the Year	
10	MF	(Belgium) Eden Hazard	Chelsea Players' Player of the Year	
10	MF	(Belgium) Eden Hazard	Chelsea Goal of the Season	
10	MF	(Belgium) Eden Hazard	Premier League Playmaker of the Season	
10	MF	(Belgium) Eden Hazard	PFA Fans' Player of the Year	
10	MF	(Belgium) Eden Hazard	UEFA Europa League Player of the Season	
20	MF	(England) Callum Hudson-Odoi	Chelsea Young Player of the Year	
51	MF	(England) Conor Gallagher	Chelsea Academy Player of the Year	
