= Brooking =

Brooking is a surname. Notable people with the surname include:

- Charles Brooking (c. 1723–1759), English painter
- Christopher Brooking (c. 1553–1627), English politician
- Keith Brooking (born 1975), American football player
- Patrick Brooking (1937–2014), British Army general
- Trevor Brooking (born 1948), English footballer and manager
- Josh Brooking (born 2002), English footballer

== See also ==
- Brookings (surname)
- Brooking, Saskatchewan
