= Archie Matthews =

English footballer (born 2001)

Personal information
- Full name: Archie Cameron Matthews
- Date of birth: 2 August 2001 (age 25)
- Place of birth: Bath, England
- Position: Goalkeeper

Youth career
- 2016–2019: Swindon Town

Senior career*
Years	Team	Apps	(Gls)
2019–2021	Swindon Town	1	(0)
2019	→ AFC Totton (loan)	2	(0)
2019–2020	→ Thatcham Town (loan)	7	(0)
2020	→ Melksham Town (loan)	0	(0)
2021–2022	Birmingham City	0	(0)
2021	→ Bath City (loan)	0	(0)
2022	→ Gloucester City (loan)	1	(0)
2022–2024	Swansea City	0	(0)
2023	→ Oxford City (loan)	2	(0)
2024	→ Penybont (loan)	1	(0)
2024–2025	Wealdstone	9	(0)
2025–2026	Penybont	12	(0)
- * Club domestic league appearances and goals as of 18:15, 22 April 2026 (UTC)

Archie Cameron Matthews (born 2 August 2001) is an English professional footballer who plays as a goalkeeper.

Matthews came through the youth system at Swindon Town and spent time on loan at Southern League clubs AFC Totton, Thatcham Town and Melksham Town before making his Football League debut for Swindon in February 2021. Released at the end of the season, he signed for Birmingham City. He spent time on loan at National League South club Bath City in 2021 and Gloucester City of the National League North in 2022 before being released, and then signed for Swansea City. In 2023, a loan spell with Oxford City of the National League South was cut short by injury, and after a brief spell on loan at Cymru Premier club Penybont, Matthews moved on to Wealdstone.

== Club career ==
=== Swindon Town ===
Matthews joined Swindon Town's academy as a 15-year-old, and took up a scholarship in 2017. His first matchday involvement with the first team came on 23 March 2019: with Lawrence Vigouroux away on international duty, Luke McCormick kept goal and Matthews was on the bench for a 4–0 League Two win against Morecambe. He was an unused substitute twice more that season, and in May 2019, together with fellow academy graduates Jacob Bancroft, Ralph Graham and Luke Haines, Matthews signed his first professional contract.

Matthews spent much of the next 18 months out on loan at Southern League Division One South clubs. He signed for AFC Totton the day before the season started, and went straight into the starting eleven for a 3–1 defeat at home to Larkhall Athletic. He made one more league appearance, but his loan came to a premature end when he was injured during the first half of the FA Cup preliminary round. He returned to the Southern League with Thatcham Town in October 2019 on a month's loan. The loan was extended, and he ended up playing 11 matches, 7 in the league and 4 in cup competitions, all as a starter. In December 2020, he joined yet another Southern League Division One South club, Melksham Town, on loan. At the time, the league was suspended because of the COVID-19 pandemic, and it did not restart.

After Matěj Kovář was recalled to Manchester United and Joe Fryer's short-term contract was not extended, Matthews was brought into Swindon's first-team squad in January 2021 as backup to loanee Mark Travers. Travers was recalled by AFC Bournemouth, and when his successor Joe Wollacott injured a knee during the pre-match warm-up, Matthews made an unexpected Football League debut, on 27 February in a 2–1 victory over Northampton Town at the County Ground. He allowed the ball to go through his hands for Northampton's goal, but according to the Swindon Advertiser, "his response was extremely impressive. Aside from one or two awkward moments, the 19-year-old made a handful of good saves and his kicking was excellent." By the next match, Connal Trueman arrived on loan, and then Lee Camp signed as a free agent. Matthews finished the season with 22 "appearances" as an unused substitute, and he left the club when his contract expired at the end of the season.

=== Birmingham City ===
Matthews signed for Championship club Birmingham City on 9 August 2021 on a one-year contract with the option of a second. He would initially be working with the development squad. On 16 September, Matthews joined National League South club Bath City on a month's loan. He kept a clean sheet on debut in the FA Cup second qualifying round win against ninth-tier opponents Shaftesbury, but then suffered a training-ground injury while with his parent club, and made no further appearances before his loan expired. Matthews joined National League North club Gloucester City on loan on 18 March 2022 as cover for their two injured goalkeepers. In the next day's 2–1 win away to Bradford (Park Avenue), he produced what the Bradford-based Telegraph & Argus described as "a superb save at the last to ensure three points for his new club on debut". It was his only appearance, and at the end of the season he was released by Birmingham, having made four starts for their under-23 team in the 2021–22 Premier League 2.

=== Swansea City ===
Matthews signed a two-year contract with another Championship club, Swansea City, on 1 July 2022. The deal included an option for a third year. He was an unused substitute for Swansea's EFL Cup match in August, but had no further involvement with the matchday squad, and on 13 January 2023 joined National League South club Oxford City on loan until the end of the season. He made a successful debut the next day away to Hampton & Richmond, saving a penalty, and was included in the Non-League Paper's National League South Team of the Day. Half an hour into his third appearance, he tore an anterior cruciate ligament and returned to Swansea City for treatment. After recovering from his injury, Matthews joined Cymru Premier club Penybont on 9 January 2024 on loan for the rest of the season. He appeared once before returning to Swansea three weeks later after Penybont signed goalkeeper Adam Przybek, and was released at the end of the season.

=== Wealdstone ===
In June 2024, Matthews signed a two-year contract with National League club Wealdstone, whose manager Matt Taylor had been a player at Swindon when Matthews was an under-18. He started the first nine games of the season, in the last of which he dislocated a shoulder. At the end of the 2024-2025 season, Matthews left the club

=== Penybont ===
In August 2025, Matthews returned to Cymru Premier club Penybont on a permanent deal. He left the club at the end of the season.

== Career statistics ==
As of match played 30 November 2024

Appearances and goals by club, season and competition
Club	Season	League			National cup		League Cup		Other		Total	
Club	Season	Division	Apps	Goals	Apps	Goals	Apps	Goals	Apps	Goals	Apps	Goals
Swindon Town	2018–19	League Two	0	0	0	0	0	0	0	0	0	0
Swindon Town	2019–20	League Two	0	0	0	0	0	0	0	0	0	0
Swindon Town	2020–21	League One	1	0	0	0	0	0	0	0	1	0
Swindon Town	Total		1	0	0	0	0	0	0	0	1	0
AFC Totton (loan)	2019–20	SL Div 1 South	2	0	1	0	—		—		3	0
Thatcham Town (loan)	2019–20	SL Div 1 South	7	0	—		—		4 (Note: Three appearances in FA Trophy, one in Berks & Bucks Senior Cup)	0	11	0
Melksham Town (loan)	2020–21	SL Div 1 South	—		—		—		—		—	
Birmingham City	2021–22	Championship	0	0	0	0	0	0	—		0	0
Bath City (loan)	2021–22	National League South	0	0	1	0	—		0	0	1	0
Gloucester City (loan)	2021–22	National League North	1	0	—		—		—		1	0
Swansea City	2022–23	Championship	0	0	0	0	0	0	—		0	0
Swansea City	2023–24	Championship	0	0	0	0	0	0	—		0	0
Swansea City	Total		0	0	0	0	0	0	0	0	0	0
Oxford City (loan)	2022–23	National League South	2	0	—		—		1 (Note: Appearance in Oxfordshire Senior Cup)	0	3	0
Penybont (loan)	2023–24	Cymru Premier	1	0	—		—		—		1	0
Wealdstone	2024–25	National League	9	0	0	0	—		0	0	9	0
Career total			23	0	2	0	0	0	5	0	30	0
