= Brookings micropolitan area =

The Brookings micropolitan area may refer to:

- The Brookings, Oregon micropolitan area, United States
- The Brookings, South Dakota micropolitan area, United States

== See also ==
- Brookings (disambiguation)
