= Tate Campbell =

English footballer

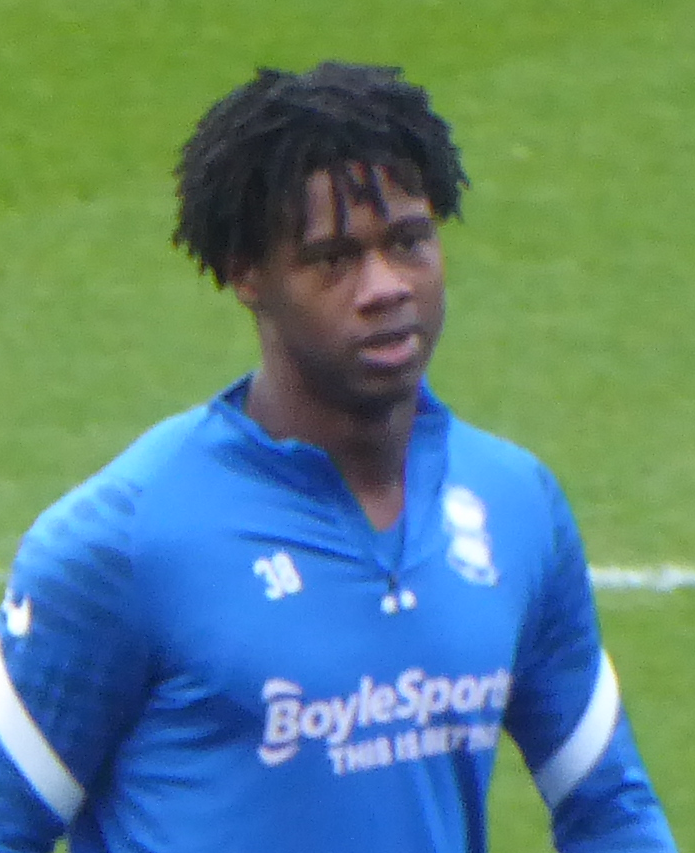
- Campbell with Birmingham City in 2022

Personal information
- Full name: Tate Lucas Campbell
- Date of birth: 27 June 2002 (age 24)
- Place of birth: Birmingham, England
- Height: 1.80 m (5 ft 11 in)
- Position: Midfielder

Team information
- Current team: Forest Green Rovers
- Number: 14

Youth career
- 2009–2018: Birmingham City

Senior career*
Years	Team	Apps	(Gls)
2018–2024	Birmingham City	1	(0)
2018–2019	→ Alvechurch (loan)	0	(0)
2021	→ Bromley (loan)	4	(1)
2023–2024	→ Bromley (loan)	1	(0)
2024–2025	Hereford	40	(6)
2025–2026	Buxton	24	(3)
2026–	Forest Green Rovers	30	(3)
- * Club domestic league appearances and goals as of 20:18, 21 November 2026 (UTC)

Tate Lucas Campbell (born 27 June 2002) is an English professional footballer who plays as a midfielder for National League club Forest Green Rovers.

Campbell began his football career with Birmingham City's academy in 2009. He spent time on loan to Alvechurch of the Southern League Premier Division Central in 2018 without playing for their first team. He made his senior debut while on loan to Bromley of the National League in 2021, and rejoined the club in July 2023, but injury prevented him from making more than a single appearance. He was released by Birmingham at the end of the 2023–24 season.

== Club career ==
=== Early life and club career ===
Campbell was born in Birmingham, and attended Priory School in the Edgbaston district. He joined Birmingham City's academy in 2009, and took up a scholarship with the club in July 2018. According to coach Steve Spooner, the 16-year-old Campbell "can play in defence or midfield. Where he is at the moment he's a better midfield player. Tate's like the lad at Chelsea, the big midfield player John Obi Mikel. He gets it, passes it, breaks play up and protects the ball well. And he is strong in the challenge." Campbell himself "regards his biggest strength as his understanding of the game".

Campbell was one of a number of Birmingham youth players who spent a few weeks on loan at non-league clubs in late 2018, as a section of the development programme designed to "take them out of their comfort zone" and give them experience of the realities of adult football. His spell was with Alvechurch of the Southern League Premier Division Central, but unlike some of his fellows he made no first-team appearances. Birmingham made him an offer of professional terms in April 2020, and in July he signed a one-year contract with an option for a second year.

=== Birmingham City ===
Described in the Birmingham Mail as "a physically powerful defensive central midfielder who can also slot in at centre half", Campbell was selected among the substitutes for Birmingham's first Championship fixture of 2021, away to Blackburn Rovers on 2 January, but remained unused.

Campbell joined National League club Bromley on 16 April on loan until 31 May. He was an unused substitute in the next day's match, and made his debut on 24 April, as a late substitute in a 2–1 win away to FC Halifax Town that took Bromley into the play-off places. According to the club website, "Fantastic work from Ben Williamson saw him find debutant Tate Campbell in space, and the on-loan Birmingham City man took the ball to the byeline, before pulling it back across for Alabi, who took a touch and fired beyond Johnson." On his third appearance, again off the bench, his diving header gave Bromley an equaliser away to Notts County, and he played once more as Bromley finished seventh and qualified for the play-offs. The loan was extended to cover their play-off campaign, which lasted only one match. He came on as a second-half substitute with his side already losing 3–1 to Hartlepool United in the elimination round; the match ended 3–2, and Hartlepool went on to win the final and gain promotion to the Football League.

During his loan spell, Birmingham confirmed that they were taking up the option on his contract. Bromley wanted to take him for a second loan, but Birmingham manager Lee Bowyer was not prepared to let him go. He played in first-team friendlies ahead of the 2021–22 season, and was named on the bench for the EFL Cup first-round match at home to Colchester United of League Two. He replaced injured centre-back Nico Gordon after 73 minutes to make his senior debut as Birmingham won 1–0. A back fracture interrupted his progress, and his next appearance came in January 2022 in the FA Cup. He was a regular in the Championship matchday squad during January and February, but remained unused. With his contract due to expire at the end of the season, the club offered him a 12-month deal with the option of another year, which he signed.

Campbell rejoined Bromley on loan for the 2023–24 season, but injury prevented him making his debut until 6 January 2024. He made no more appearances, and was released by Birmingham at the end of the season.

=== Hereford ===
After his release by Birmingham, Campbell spent time on trial at National League North club Hereford, signing with the club on 2 August 2024. During the 2024–25 season, Campbell made 44 appearances and scored six goals across all competitions, as Hereford finished 10th and missed out on the play-offs by one point. On 20 June 2025, Campbell announced on X that he would be leaving the club, despite being offered an extension to remain at the club.

=== Buxton ===
One day after announcing his departure from Hereford, Campbell secured a return to full-time football by signing for their divisional rivals Buxton, following his Hereford teammate Sammy Robinson to the club.

=== Forest Green Rovers ===
On 5 February 2026, Campbell signed for National League club Forest Green Rovers for an undisclosed fee.

== Career statistics ==
As of match played 21 November 2026

Appearances and goals by club, season and competition
Club	Season	League			FA Cup		League Cup		Other		Total	
Club	Season	Division	Apps	Goals	Apps	Goals	Apps	Goals	Apps	Goals	Apps	Goals
Birmingham City	2020–21	Championship	0	0	0	0	0	0	—		0	0
Birmingham City	2021–22	Championship	0	0	1	0	1	0	—		2	0
Birmingham City	2022–23	Championship	1	0	0	0	1	0	—		2	0
Birmingham City	Total		1	0	1	0	2	0	—		4	0
Bromley (loan)	2020–21	National League	4	1	—		—		1 (Note: Appearance in National League play-offs)	0	5	1
Bromley (loan)	2023–24	National League	1	0	0	0	—		1 (Note: Appearance in FA Trophy)	0	2	0
Bromley (loan)	Total		5	1	—		—		2	0	7	1
Hereford	2024–25	National League North	40	6	3	0	—		1	0	44	6
Buxton	2025–26	National League North	24	3	2	1	—		0	0	26	4
Forest Green Rovers	2025–26	National League	15	1	—		—		1	0	16	1
Forest Green Rovers	2026–27	National League	15	2	1	0	—		0	0	16	2
Forest Green Rovers	Total		30	3	1	0	0	0	1	0	32	3
Career total			100	13	7	1	2	0	4	0	113	14
