= Brookings =

Brookings may refer to:

== Organizations ==
- Brookings Institution, a nonprofit, nonpartisan public policy organization based in Washington, D.C.

== Places ==
- Brookings, Oregon, USA
- Brookings, South Dakota, USA
- Brookings County, South Dakota, USA

== People ==
- Brookings (surname)

== Other uses ==
- Brookings Airport, an airport in Brookings, Oregon
- The Brookings effect, a weather pattern on the Oregon coast
- Brookings Hall the administrative building at Washington University in St. Louis
- Brookings Regional Airport, an airport in Brookings, South Dakota
- The Brookings Report, a 1961 Brookings Institution report on the implications of space travel
