= Brookings (surname) =

Brookings is a surname. Notable people with the surname include:

- Robert S. Brookings (1850–1932), American businessman and philanthropist
- Wilmot Brookings (1830–1905), American pioneer, frontier judge, and politician
- Josh Brooking (born 2002), English footballer

== See also ==
- Brooking
