= 2021–22 Birmingham City F.C. season =

Birmingham City F.C.
2021–22 season
- Owner: Birmingham Sports Holdings 75.00%; Oriental Rainbow 21.64%
- Head coach: Lee Bowyer
- Stadium: St Andrew's
- Championship: 20th
- FA Cup: Third round (eliminated by Plymouth Argyle)
- EFL Cup: Second round (eliminated by Fulham)
- Top goalscorer: League: Scott Hogan (10); All: Scott Hogan (10)
- Highest home attendance: 18,659 (vs Blackburn Rovers, 7 May 2022)
- Lowest home attendance: 4,783 (vs Fulham, EFL Cup 2nd round, 24 August 2021)
- Average home league attendance: 16,161
Home colours	Away colours	Third colours

The 2021–22 season was Birmingham City Football Club's 119th season in the English football league system and 11th consecutive season in the second-tier Championship. As with all English Football League clubs, the first team also competed in the FA Cup and EFL Cup.

The season covered the period from 1 July 2021 to 30 June 2022.

== Background and pre-season ==
All Birmingham's home matches in the 2020–21 season were played behind closed doors because of the COVID-19 pandemic. Under head coach Aitor Karanka, Birmingham City gradually slid down the 2020–21 Championship table until, with ten games remaining and in serious danger of relegation, former Birmingham player Lee Bowyer resigned as manager of Charlton Athletic to take over as head coach. The team lost only one of the next eight matches and retained their Championship status with two games still to play. On 11 May 2021, CEO Ren Xuandong resigned.

In June 2020, the club announced a four-year partnership with Nike as supplier of kits, which carry the logo of the club's principal sponsor, Irish bookmaker BoyleSports. The home shirt has a camouflage-patterned front in two shades of blue, worn with white shorts and blue socks, while the away kit has a yellow shirt with blue pinstripes and trim, similar to the Europa League kit of ten years before, with blue shirts and white socks. In November, they brought out a limited-edition third kit; the shirt has a camouflage front in orange and green and a predominantly green back, and is worn with orange shorts and socks.

After a training camp in Scotland, Birmingham planned five pre-season friendlies: away to Cheltenham Town and Northampton Town, behind-closed-doors games at the Wast Hills training ground against Oxford United – who cancelled due to COVID-19 and were replaced by a Salford City XI – and Barrow, and one match at St Andrew's against West Bromwich Albion.

Pre-season friendly match details
Date	Opponents	Venue	Result	Score F–A	Scorers	Refs
17 July 2021	Cheltenham Town	A	W	3–0	Gardner 6', Hogan 36', Leko 82'	
20 July 2021	Barrow	H	D	1–1	Gardner 76'	
24 July 2021	Salford City XI	H	W	7–0	Stirk 1', Williams 9', Lakin 45', Hogan (2) 47', 70', Aneke 48', George 87'	
24 July 2021	Northampton Town	A	L	2–3	Sánchez 5', Jutkiewicz 38'	
31 July 2021	West Bromwich Albion	H	L	0–4		

== EFL Championship ==
=== League table ===
Pos	Team	Pld	W	D	L	GF	GA	GD	Pts	Promotion, qualification or relegation
17	Bristol City	46	15	10	21	62	77	−15	55	
18	Cardiff City	46	15	8	23	50	68	−18	53	
19	Hull City	46	14	9	23	41	54	−13	51	
20	Birmingham City	46	11	14	21	50	75	−25	47	
21	Reading	46	13	8	25	54	87	−33	41 (Note: Reading were deducted 6 points for breach of profit and sustainability regulations.)	
22	Peterborough United (R)	46	9	10	27	43	87	−44	37	Relegation to EFL League One
23	Derby County (R)	46	14	13	19	45	53	−8	34 (Note: Derby County were deducted 12 points for entering administration, and a further 9 points for financial irregularities.)	Relegation to EFL League One

Rules for classification: 1) Points; 2) Goal difference; 3) Number of goals scored; 4) Head-to-head results; 5) Wins; 6) Away goals; 7) Penalty points (sec 9.5); 8) 12-point sending off offences
(R) Relegated

=== Results summary ===
Overall								Home						Away					
Pld	W	D	L	GF	GA	GD	Pts	W	D	L	GF	GA	GD	W	D	L	GF	GA	GD
46	11	14	21	50	75	−25	47	7	6	10	27	33	−6	4	8	11	23	42	−19

=== Match results ===
EFL Championship match details
Date	League position	Opponents	Venue	Result	Score F–A	Scorers	Attendance	Refs
7 August 2021	5th	Sheffield United	A	W	1–0	Colin 19'	29,043	
14 August 2021	10th	Stoke City	H	D	0–0		10,189	
18 August 2021	14th	AFC Bournemouth	H	L	0–2		9,922	
21 August 2021	8th	Luton Town	A	W	5–0	Marc Roberts 7', Hogan (2) 26', 47', Gardner 84', Aneke 88'	10,014	
28 August 2021	8th	Barnsley	A	D	1–1	Jutkiewicz 33'	13,950	
10 September 2021	4th	Derby County	H	W	2–0	Hogan 31', Bela 81'	14,912	
15 September 2021	10th	Fulham	H	L	1–4	Deeney 87' (pen.)	14,562	
18 September 2021	11th	Peterborough United	A	L	0–3		12,199	
25 September 2021	12th	Preston North End	H	D	0–0		14,925	
28 September 2021	13th	Queens Park Rangers	A	L	0–2		12,257	
2 October 2021	16th	Nottingham Forest	H	L	0–3		15,148	
15 October 2021	16th	West Bromwich Albion	A	L	0–1		24,870	
20 October 2021	19th	Huddersfield Town	A	D	0–0		15,618	
23 October 2021	17th	Swansea City	H	W	2–1	Deeney 47', McGree 82'	16,132	
30 October 2021	14th	Middlesbrough	A	W	2–0	Marc Roberts 53', Hogan 56'	21,582	
2 November 2021	13th	Bristol City	H	W	3–0	McGree 14', Hogan 68', Gardner 76'	16,143	
6 November 2021	15th	Reading	H	L	1–2	Hogan 3'	17,535	
20 November 2021	15th	Hull City	A	L	0–2		12,409	
23 November 2021	17th	Coventry City	A	D	0–0		22,676	
27 November 2021	13th	Blackpool	H	W	1–0	Jutkiewicz 81'	17,686	
4 December 2021	15th	Millwall	A	L	1–3	Deeney 56'	14,324	
11 December 2021	15th	Cardiff City	H	D	2–2	Deeney 29', Šunjić 45+1'	17,840	
18 December 2021	17th	Blackburn Rovers	A	L	0–4		12,148	
2 January 2022	18th	Queens Park Rangers	H	L	1–2	Aneke 75'	18,279	
15 January 2022	18th	Preston North End	A	D	1–1	Hogan 86'	12,821	
18 January 2022	18th	Fulham	A	L	2–6	Šunjić 45', Gardner 74'	16,491	
22 January 2022	18th	Barnsley	H	W	2–1	Hernández 34', Hogan 51'	15,742	
25 January 2022	18th	Peterborough United	H	D	2–2	Gardner 85', Hogan 88'	16,380	
30 January 2022	17th	Derby County	A	D	2–2	Taylor 7', Hogan 56'	32,211	
4 February 2022	17th	Sheffield United	H	L	1–2	Taylor 61'	17,194	
9 February 2022	18th	AFC Bournemouth	A	L	1–3	Hernández 69'	8,708	
12 February 2022	17th	Luton Town	H	W	3–0	Bacuna 25', Taylor 46', Hernández 69'	17,292	
19 February 2022	18th	Stoke City	A	D	2–2	James 12', Gardner 58'	23,502	
22 February 2022	18th	Reading	A	L	1–2	McIntyre 82' (o.g.)	12,073	
26 February 2022	19th	Huddersfield Town	H	L	0–2		17,318	
5 March 2022	18th	Bristol City	A	W	2–1	Chong 2', Gordon 13'	21,942	
12 March 2022	19th	Hull City	H	D	0–0		17,231	
15 March 2022	19th	Middlesbrough	H	L	0–2		15,852	
19 March 2022	19th	Swansea City	A	D	0–0		18,620	
3 April 2022	18th	West Bromwich Albion	H	W	1–0	Taylor 67' (pen.)	17,936	
9 April 2022	18th	Nottingham Forest	A	L	0–2		29,293	
15 April 2022	20th	Coventry City	H	L	2–4	Pedersen 12', Gardner 39'	17,634	
18 April 2022	20th	Blackpool	A	L	1–6	Šunjić 63'	13,993	
23 April 2022	20th	Millwall	H	D	2–2	Bacuna 47', Taylor 79' (pen.)	17,206	
30 April 2022	20th	Cardiff City	A	D	1–1	Bela 22'	21,395	
7 May 2022	20th	Blackburn Rovers	H	L	1–2	Pedersen 78'	18,659	

== FA Cup ==
Birmingham City were drawn at home to League One club Plymouth Argyle in the third round.

FA Cup match details
Round	Date	Opponents	Venue	Result	Score F–A	Scorers	Attendance	Refs
Third round	8 January 2022	Plymouth Argyle	H	L	0–1 (a.e.t.)		9,823	

== EFL Cup ==
Birmingham were drawn to play League One club Colchester United at home in the first round. Bowyer made 11 changes from the team that started at Sheffield United 72 hours earlier, giving debuts to Chuks Aneke, Jordan Graham and Marcel Oakley, and it was Oakley who scored the only goal of the game with a 75th-minute deflected shot. Tate Campbell made his Birmingham debut as a substitute, and Jobe Bellingham, the 15-year-old brother of England international Jude, was also named on the bench. In the second round they fielded a slightly less weakened team, but still made 10 changes from the previous league match, with Mitch Roberts, Dion Sanderson and (as a substitute) Alfie Chang making their first Birmingham appearances and Neil Etheridge returning in goal after recovering from COVID-19. Opponents Fulham, newly relegated from the Premier League, scored midway through the first half after an error by Ivan Šunjić, but Birmingham held out until stoppage time before conceding a second.

EFL Cup match details
Round	Date	Opponents	Venue	Result	Score F–A	Scorers	Attendance	Refs
First round	10 August 2021	Colchester United	H	W	1–0	Oakley 75'	6,199	
Second round	24 August 2021	Fulham	H	L	0–2		4,783	

== Transfers ==
=== In ===
Date	Player	Club †	Fee	Refs
1 July 2021	Chuks Aneke	(Charlton Athletic)	Free	
1 July 2021	Jordan Graham	(Gillingham)	Free	
1 July 2021	Ryan Woods	(Stoke City)	Free	
16 July 2021	Oliver Basey	(Sunderland)	Free	
9 August 2021	Archie Matthews	(Swindon Town)	Free	
31 August 2021	Troy Deeney	Watford	Free	
15 November 2021	Renedi Masampu	(Dulwich Hamlet)	Free	
27 January 2022	Juninho Bacuna	Rangers	Undisclosed	

† Brackets round a club's name indicate the player's contract with that club had expired before he joined Birmingham.

=== Loaned in ===
Date	Player	Club	Return	Refs
1 July 2021	Riley McGree	Charlotte FC	1 January 2022	
6 July 2021	Juan Castillo	Chelsea	End of season, recalled 21 January 2022	
9 July 2021	Tahith Chong	Manchester United	End of season	
19 July 2021	Dion Sanderson	Wolverhampton Wanderers	End of season, recalled 4 January 2022	
26 July 2021	Matija Sarkic	Wolverhampton Wanderers	End of season, terminated (injury) 6 January 2022	
4 January 2022	Teden Mengi	Manchester United	End of season	
7 January 2022	Taylor Richards	Brighton & Hove Albion	End of season	
14 January 2022	Onel Hernández	Norwich City	End of season	
27 January 2022	Lyle Taylor	Nottingham Forest	End of season	

=== Out ===
Date	Player	Club †	Fee	Refs
15 July 2021	Andrés Prieto	(Dinamo Tbilisi)	Mutual consent	
22 July 2021	Steve Seddon	Oxford United	Undisclosed	
31 August 2021	Charlie Lakin	Burton Albion	Undisclosed	
5 November 2021	Adam Clayton	(Doncaster Rovers)	Mutual consent	
7 January 2022	Caolan Boyd-Munce	Middlesbrough	Undisclosed	
14 January 2022	Chuks Aneke	Charlton Athletic	Undisclosed	
21 January 2022	Connor Barratt	Sheffield United	Undisclosed	
31 January 2022	Leo Dos Reis	Monza	Undisclosed	
17 February 2022	Cianole Nguepissi	West Bromwich Albion	Free	
30 June 2022	Jérémie Bela	(Clermont Foot)	Contract expired	
30 June 2022	Renedi Masampu	(Metropolitan Police)	Released	
30 June 2022	Archie Matthews	(Swansea City)	Released	
30 June 2022	Kristian Pedersen	(1. FC Köln)	Contract expired	
30 June 2022	Oriol Soldevila	(Intercity)	Released	
30 June 2022	Kane Thompson-Sommers	(Hereford)	Released	
30 June 2022	Connal Trueman	(Millwall)	Released	
30 June 2022	Yoane Zohore		Released	
30 June 2022	Iván Sánchez	Real Valladolid	Undisclosed	
30 June 2022	Fran Villalba	Sporting Gijon	Undisclosed	

† Brackets round a club's name denote the player joined that club after his Birmingham City contract expired.

=== Loaned out ===
Date	Player	Club	Return	Refs
27 July 2021	Ryan Stirk	Mansfield Town	End of season	
30 July 2021	Zach Jeacock	Salford City	End of season, recalled 11 January 2022	
2 August 2021	Kane Thompson-Sommers	Woking	January 2022	
3 August 2021	Fran Villalba	Sporting Gijon	End of season	
9 August 2021	Odin Bailey	Livingston	End of season	
10 August 2021	Josh Andrews	Rochdale	End of season	
11 August 2021	Sam Cosgrove	Shrewsbury Town	End of season, recalled 31 January 2022	
31 August 2021	Jonathan Leko	Charlton Athletic	End of season	
16 September 2021	Archie Matthews	Bath City	16 October 2021	
23 November 2021	Connal Trueman	Oxford United	30 November 2021	
26 November 2021	Oliver Basey	Hednesford Town	5 January 2022	
26 January 2022	Harlee Dean	Sheffield Wednesday	End of season	
31 January 2022	Sam Cosgrove	AFC Wimbledon	End of season	
31 January 2022	Mitchell Roberts	Carlisle United	End of season	
31 January 2022	Iván Sánchez	Real Valladolid	End of season	
11 February 2022	Kyle Hurst	Alvechurch	End of season	
11 March 2022	Oliver Basey	Hednesford Town	End of season	
18 March 2022	Archie Matthews	Gloucester City	One month	
24 March 2022	Yohan Zohore	Hednesford Town	End of season	

== Appearances and goals ==
Numbers in parentheses denote appearances made as a substitute.
Players marked † left the club during the playing season.
Players with names in italics and marked * were on loan from another club for the whole of their season with Birmingham.
Players listed with no appearances have been in the matchday squad but only as unused substitutes.
Key to positions: GK – Goalkeeper; DF – Defender; MF – Midfielder; FW – Forward

Players' appearances and goals by competition
No.	Pos.	Nat.	Name	League		FA Cup		EFL Cup		Total		Discipline	
No.	Pos.	Nat.	Name	Apps	Goals	Apps	Goals	Apps	Goals	Apps	Goals	A yellow rectangle, denoting the yellow penalty card shown to a player being cautioned	A red rectangle, denoting the red penalty card shown to a player being sent off
1	GK	PHI	Neil Etheridge	21	0	1	0	1	0	23	0	2	0
2	DF	FRA	Maxime Colin	31 (2)	1	1	0	0	0	32 (2)	1	2	0
3	DF	DEN	Kristian Pedersen	37	2	1	0	0	0	38	2	11	1
4	DF	ENG	Marc Roberts	39	2	0	0	0	0	39	2	7	0
5	DF	ENG	George Friend	12 (2)	0	1	0	2	0	15 (2)	0	2	1
6	MF	ENG	Ryan Woods	25 (5)	0	1	0	0	0	26 (5)	0	7	1
7	MF	NED	Tahith Chong *	19 (1)	1	0	0	0	0	19 (1)	1	2	0
8	MF	ENG	Taylor Richards *	2 (4)	0	0	0	0	0	2 (4)	0	1	0
9	FW	IRL	Scott Hogan	28 (8)	10	1	0	0	0	29 (8)	10	2	0
10	FW	ENG	Lukas Jutkiewicz	17 (19)	2	0	0	0	0	17 (19)	2	1	0
11	FW	FRA	Jérémie Bela	26 (5)	2	0	0	0	0	26 (5)	2	3	0
12	DF	ENG	Harlee Dean	14 (1)	0	0	0	0	0	14 (1)	0	2	0
13	GK	MNE	Matija Sarkic * †	23	0	0	0	0	0	23	0	0	0
14	FW	ENG	Jonathan Leko	1 (3)	0	0	0	2	0	3 (3)	0	1	0
15	FW	ENG	Chuks Aneke †	1 (17)	2	0 (1)	0	2	0	3 (18)	2	2	0
17	MF	ESP	Iván Sánchez	0 (2)	0	0	0	1	0	1 (2)	0	0	0
18	MF	AUS	Riley McGree * †	10 (3)	2	0	0	1 (1)	0	11 (4)	2	5	0
18	DF	ENG	Teden Mengi *	9	0	1	0	0	0	10	0	1	0
19	MF	WAL	Jordan James	13 (7)	1	1	0	0	0	14 (7)	1	1	0
20	MF	ENG	Gary Gardner	31 (4)	6	1	0	0	0	32 (4)	6	9	2
21	DF	ENG	Dion Sanderson * †	14 (1)	0	0	0	1	0	15 (1)	0	2	0
21	MF	CUR	Juninho Bacuna	16 (1)	2	0	0	0	0	16 (1)	2	4	0
23	DF	NED	Juan Castillo * †	1 (2)	0	0	0	2	1	2 (2)	0	1	0
24	MF	ENG	Jordan Graham	18 (6)	0	0	0	2	0	20 (6)	0	1	0
25	MF	CUB	Onel Hernández *	22	3	0	0	0	0	22	3	3	0
27	GK	ENG	Connal Trueman	0 (1)	0	0	0	1	0	1 (1)	0	0	0
31	MF	ENG	Charlie Lakin †	0	0	0	0	1 (1)	0	1 (1)	0	0	0
33	FW	MSR	Lyle Taylor *	14	5	0	0	0	0	14	5	3	0
34	MF	CRO	Ivan Šunjić	33 (8)	3	0 (1)	0	2	0	35 (9)	3	8	0
35	MF	ENG	George Hall	1 (1)	0	0	0	0	0	1 (1)	0	0	0
36	FW	ENG	Troy Deeney	15 (6)	4	1	0	0	0	16 (6)	4	0	0
38	GK	ENG	Zach Jeacock	2	0	0	0	0	0	2	0	0	0
39	MF	ENG	Jobe Bellingham	0 (2)	0	0 (1)	0	0	0	0 (3)	0	0	0
41	MF	ENG	Remi Walker	0	0	0	0	0	0	0	0	0	0
42	MF	ENG	Alfie Chang	0	0	0 (1)	0	0 (1)	0	0 (2)	0	0	0
43	DF	ENG	Mitch Roberts	1	0	0	0	1	0	2	0	0	0
45	DF	ENG	Renedi Masampu	0	0	0	0	0	0	0	0	0	0
46	MF	ENG	Brandon Khela	0	0	0	0	0	0	0	0	0	0
48	MF	ENG	Josh Williams	0	0	0 (1)	0	0 (1)	0	0 (2)	0	0	0
50	DF	ENG	Nico Gordon	11	1	0	0	1	0	12	1	2	0
52	DF	ENG	Marcel Oakley	2	0	0	0	2	1	4	1	1	0
53	MF	ENG	Tate Campbell	0	0	1	0	0 (1)	0	2 (1)	0	0	0
54	FW	ENG	Keyendrah Simmonds	0	0	0	0	0 (1)	0	0 (1)	0	0	0

Players not included in matchday squads
No.	Pos.	Nat.	Name
16	FW	ENG	Sam Cosgrove
37	MF	ENG	Odin Bailey
40	FW	ENG	Adan George
44	MF	NIR	Caolan Boyd-Munce †
47	MF	WAL	Ryan Stirk
51	MF	ENG	Kyle Hurst
