= Christopher Brooking =

English politician

Christopher Brooking (c. 1553–1627), of Totnes, Devon, was an English politician.

He was a member (MP) of the parliament of England for Totnes in 1604.
