= Connal Trueman =

English footballer (born 1996)

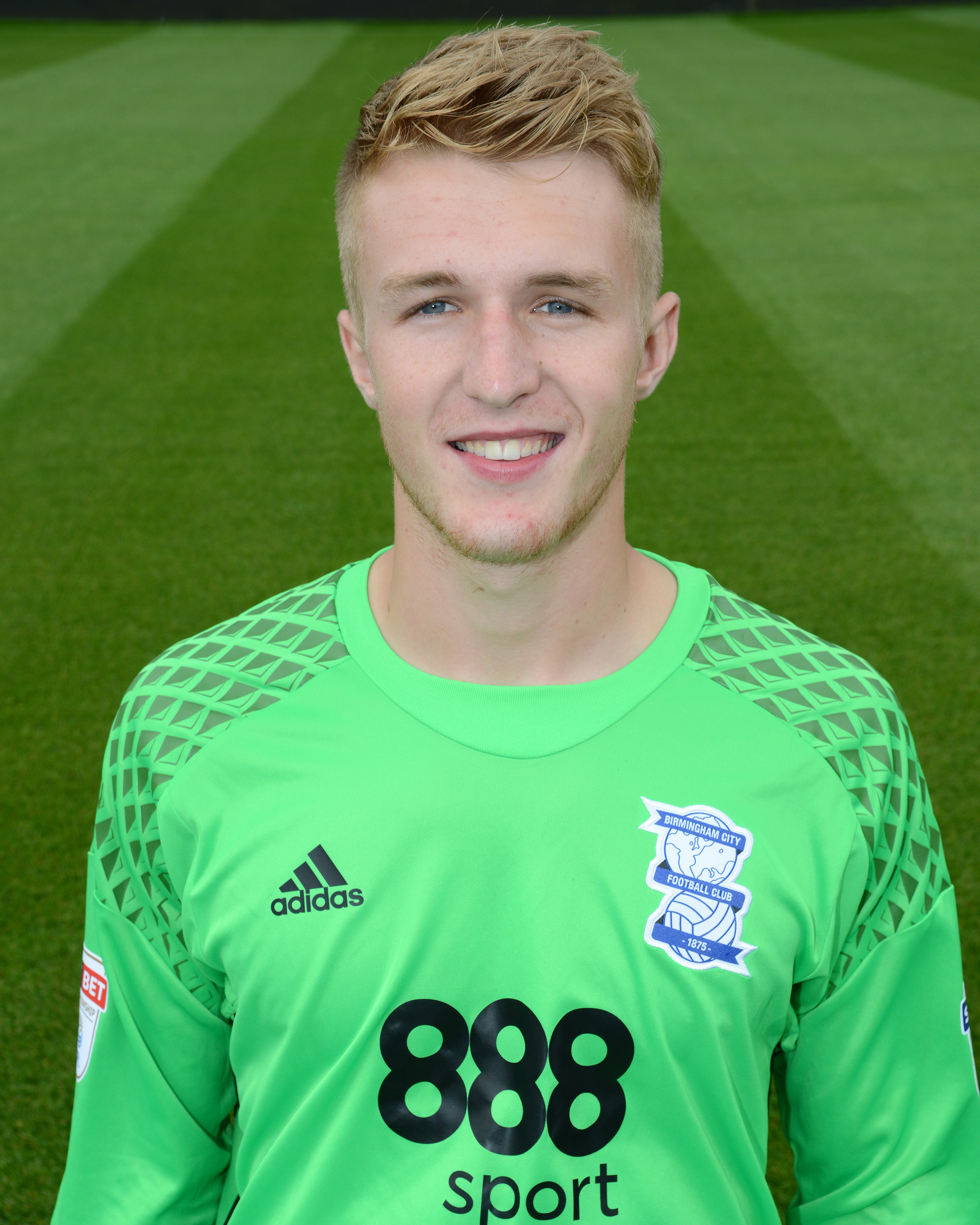
- Trueman with Birmingham City in 2016

Personal information
- Full name: Connal Joe Trueman
- Date of birth: 26 March 1996 (age 30)
- Place of birth: Birmingham, England
- Height: 6 ft 1 in (1.86 m)
- Position: Goalkeeper

Team information
- Current team: Sheffield Wednesday
- Number: 27

Youth career
- 2007–2014: Birmingham City

Senior career*
Years	Team	Apps	(Gls)
2014–2022	Birmingham City	14	(0)
2014	→ Leamington (loan)	2	(0)
2017	→ Solihull Moors (loan)	4	(0)
2020–2021	→ AFC Wimbledon (loan)	19	(0)
2021	→ Swindon Town (loan)	4	(0)
2021	→ Oxford United (loan)	2	(0)
2022–2025	Millwall	0	(0)
2024	→ Crawley Town (loan)	1	(0)
2024	→ Crawley Town (loan)	3	(0)
2025–2026	Milton Keynes Dons	15	(0)
2026–	Sheffield Wednesday	0	(0)
- * Club domestic league appearances and goals as of 20:58, 11 November 2026 (UTC)

Connal Joe Trueman (born 26 March 1996) is an English footballer who plays as a goalkeeper for EFL League One club Sheffield Wednesday.

A graduate of Birmingham City's academy, Trueman's previous clubs include Millwall, Crawley Town, Oxford United, Swindon Town, AFC Wimbledon, Solihull Moors and Leamington.

== Club career ==
=== Early life and career ===
Trueman was born in Birmingham and attended King Edward VI Aston School. He joined Birmingham City's academy in 2007, and took up a scholarship in July 2012. He signed his first professional contract, of one year with the option of a second, in June 2014. When first-choice goalkeeper Darren Randolph had to miss the visit to Blackburn Rovers in October 2014 through suspension and previous third-choice Nick Townsend's loan had no recall clause, Trueman was given a squad number and a place among the substitutes; he remained unused. He then spent time on loan at Leamington, for whom he played twice in the Conference North and once in the FA Trophy.

=== Birmingham City ===
At the end of the 2014–15 season, Birmingham took up their option for another year on Trueman's contract, and in April 2016, he signed a one-year contract, with the option for a further year. He made his first appearance of the season in a matchday squad on 30 April, at home to Middlesbrough, when Adam Legzdins took over in goal after Tomasz Kuszczak underwent surgery on a broken nose, and kept his place on the bench for the last match of the campaign, away to Cardiff City. In between, he was an unused substitute for the Birmingham reserve team that lost the 2016 Birmingham Senior Cup final to National League North champions Solihull Moors. On 13 September 2016, away to Reading, Kuszczak was injured during the warm-up, so Legzdins took his place in the starting eleven and Trueman was added to the substitutes. He retained his place in the matchday squad for a further four league matches while Kuszczak recovered. He signed a new three-year contract in May 2017.

When David Stockdale joined in 2018, Trueman dropped to fourth choice, and went on loan to Solihull Moors until January 2018. An injury to Stockdale in September left the club with only one fit professional goalkeeper (Legzdins was sold before the season started), so Trueman was recalled to act as backup to Kuszczak. When Stockdale returned to the starting eleven in November, manager Steve Cotterill retained Trueman in the matchday squad, but when Garry Monk took over in March, he recalled Kuszczak to the bench.

At the end of the season, Monk told both Stockdale and Kuszczak they were free to find other clubs, and neither took part in the first team's pre-season training. A bid for Ipswich Town's Bartosz Białkowski came to nothing, and Trueman went through pre-season as first-choice goalkeeper. He made his Football League debut in the starting eleven for the opening match of Birmingham's 2018–19 season, a 2–2 draw at home to Norwich City in the Championship, and despite the arrival of the experienced Lee Camp kept his place for the visit to Middlesbrough. According to the Birmingham Mail, Trueman "had no chance with a superbly struck goal but [was] all at sea on a couple of occasions", and Camp took over for the next match and the rest of the season, with Trueman as a regular on the bench. With Birmingham safe from relegation, he was due to start the final match of the season, away to Reading, but illness prevented his appearance.

Trueman signed a two-year contract extension ahead of the 2019–20 season, which he began as third choice, with Camp in the team and Stockdale on the bench. He came into the matchday squad in late October after Stockdale was injured in training, and after Camp made mistakes that cost the team points, made his first appearance of the season on 23 November away to Huddersfield Town. He performed well enough to keep his place, and held it for ten matches, but after he and the team conceded five goals to Leeds United and then three against Hull City, Camp was recalled for his ability to organise his defence and retained for the rest of the season.

=== Loans ===
On 4 August 2020, the day after Camp left Birmingham at the end of his contract, Trueman joined League One club AFC Wimbledon for the 2020–21 campaign. He was given squad number 1, and began his loan in the starting eleven for the opening match of the season, a 2–1 win at home to Charlton Athletic in the EFL Trophy. After appearing in 22 matches for the Dons, Trueman was recalled by Birmingham on 8 January 2021. Trueman was an unused substitute for Birmingham once in mid-January in the absence of regular backup goalkeeper Andrés Prieto, and on 1 March, he joined League One club Swindon Town on an emergency loan. He started four matches, all defeats, before returning to his parent club.

Having been a regular on Birmingham's bench as backup to loanee Matija Sarkic in the 2021–22 season while Etheridge recovered from COVID-19, Trueman joined League One club Oxford United on an emergency loan on 23 November 2021, and played twice. When Sarkic's loan spell was ended by a dislocated shoulder, Trueman resumed his place on the bench as backup to Etheridge. He was used once, playing the last 20 minutes of the visit to Nottingham Forest in April 2022 after Etheridge was knocked unconscious in collision with Djed Spence; he conceded shortly after coming on, as Birmingham lost 2–0, and Zach Jeacock took over the starting role for the next two matches.

After 15 years with the club, Trueman was released by Birmingham when his contract expired at the end of the 2021–22 season.

=== Millwall ===
Trueman joined Championship club Millwall on 4 August 2022 on a short-term contract running until January 2023. His contract was extended twice, initially for the remainder of the 2022–23 season and then for a further two years.

Trueman joined League One club Crawley Town on 7 October 2024 on a seven-day emergency loan. He played twice, and rejoined Crawley on loan on 6 November, again to cover the international break.

=== Milton Keynes Dons ===
Trueman signed for League Two club Milton Keynes Dons on 3 February 2025, initially until the end of the season On 24 June 2025, the club announced he had signed a new contract. Under new head coach Paul Warne, Trueman saw limited opportunities as back-up to number one goalkeeper Craig MacGillivray, but achieved promotion with the club as it finished in second-place and returned to League One.

=== Sheffield Wednesday ===
On 30 July 2026, Trueman signed a one-year contract with League One club Sheffield Wednesday. He made his debut in the EFL Trophy against Sunderland U21 starting the game in the 2–0 win.

== Career statistics ==
As of 11 November 2026

Appearances and goals by club, season and competition
Club	Season	League			FA Cup		EFL Cup		Other		Total	
Club	Season	Division	Apps	Goals	Apps	Goals	Apps	Goals	Apps	Goals	Apps	Goals
Birmingham City	2014–15	Championship	0	0	0	0	0	0	—		0	0
Birmingham City	2015–16	Championship	0	0	0	0	0	0	—		0	0
Birmingham City	2016–17	Championship	0	0	0	0	0	0	—		0	0
Birmingham City	2017–18	Championship	0	0	0	0	—		—		0	0
Birmingham City	2018–19	Championship	2	0	0	0	0	0	—		2	0
Birmingham City	2019–20	Championship	10	0	0	0	0	0	—		10	0
Birmingham City	2020–21	Championship	1	0	—		—		—		1	0
Birmingham City	2021–22	Championship	1	0	0	0	1	0	—		2	0
Birmingham City	Total		14	0	0	0	1	0	—		15	0
Leamington (loan)	2014–15	Conference North	2	0	—		—		1 (Note: Appearance in FA Trophy)	0	3	0
Solihull Moors (loan)	2017–18	National League	4	0	—		—		—		4	0
AFC Wimbledon (loan)	2020–21	League One	19	0	1	0	1	0	1 (Note: Appearance in EFL Trophy)	0	22	0
Swindon Town (loan)	2020–21	League One	4	0	—		—		—		4	0
Oxford United (loan)	2021–22	League One	2	0	—		—		0	0	2	0
Millwall	2022–23	Championship	0	0	0	0	0	0	—		0	0
Millwall	2023–24	Championship	0	0	0	0	0	0	—		0	0
Millwall	2024–25	Championship	0	0	0	0	0	0	—		0	0
Millwall	Total		0	0	0	0	0	0	—		0	0
Crawley Town (loan)	2024–25	League One	4	0	0	0	—		2	0	6	0
Milton Keynes Dons	2024–25	League Two	13	0	—		—		—		13	0
Milton Keynes Dons	2025–26	League Two	2	0	1	0	1	0	3	0	7	0
Milton Keynes Dons	Total		15	0	1	0	1	0	3	0	20	0
Sheffield Wednesday	2026–27	League One	0	0	1	0	0	0	2	0	3	0
Career total			64	0	3	0	3	0	9	0	79	0
