= Nico Gordon =

Montserratian footballer (born 2002)

Personal information
- Full name: Nico Diago Gordon
- Date of birth: 28 April 2002 (age 24)
- Place of birth: Birmingham, England
- Height: 6 ft 0 in (1.83 m)
- Position: Defender

Team information
- Current team: Monterey Bay
- Number: 5

Youth career
- 2014–2020: Birmingham City

Senior career*
Years	Team	Apps	(Gls)
2020–2024	Birmingham City	15	(1)
2023–2024	→ Solihull Moors (loan)	1	(0)
2024	North Texas	22	(0)
2025–	Monterey Bay	42	(0)

International career^{‡}
2023–	Montserrat	13	(0)
- * Club domestic league appearances and goals as of 18:47, 9 November 2026 (UTC) ‡ National team caps and goals as of 18:37, 19 September 2026 (UTC)

Nico Diago Gordon (born 28 April 2002) is a professional footballer who plays as a defender for USL Championship club Monterey Bay. Born in England, he plays for the Montserrat national team.

== Early life and career ==
Gordon was born in Birmingham and attended St Thomas Aquinas Catholic School in the Kings Norton district. He joined Birmingham City in 2014, and took up a two-year scholarship with their Academy in July 2018. According to coach Steve Spooner, Gordon "can play anywhere across the back and midfield. He's currently at centre-half. He's an excellent reader of the game. He steps in and can find passes. He played for the 18s last year and has started this season very well."

He made his competitive debut for Birmingham's development squad team in August 2019, playing at right back in a 1–1 draw with Crystal Palace U23, and became a regular in the side. He also captained the under-18 team as they reached the fifth round of the 2019–20 FA Youth Cup. Gordon was given a first-team squad number early in 2020, he was 19th man for the FA Cup replay against Coventry City, and in April 2020, the club confirmed that he had been made an offer of a three-year professional contract, with the option of a fourth year. He signed the contract on 26 June.

== Club career ==
=== Birmingham City ===
When the 2019–20 EFL Championship season resumed after its COVID-19 pandemic-related suspension, Gordon was one of several youngsters named on the bench for Birmingham's first match under the temporary rules. He remained unused, but made his Football League debut in the next fixture, on 27 June 2020 at home to Hull City, replacing the injured Jake Clarke-Salter after 87 minutes with his team 3–2 down; the match finished 3–3. Gordon was given his first start on 12 July away to Stoke City, playing on the left of three centre backs and facing the powerful Tyrese Campbell. With Stoke 2–0 up at half-time, caretaker head coach Spooner changed to a back four, and Gordon was more comfortable at left back; the score remained 2–0. He played once more that season, and a further twice at the end of the following season, when, with relegation avoided, new manager Lee Bowyer used the last two fixtures to look at fringe players. Both were heavy defeats, though the Birmingham Mail's reporter thought he "did OK against one of the better attacking forces in the league" in the 5–2 defeat to Blackburn Rovers.

Gordon was Birmingham's man of the match in the EFL Cup win against Colchester United in August 2021. Partnering George Friend in central defence, he "show[ed] great composure and strength, while he was sound in possession and with his passing", but late in the game he aggravated a groin problem. Eventually he had surgery, and was well on the way to recovery when the wound became infected, and he was hospitalised, spending three days on a drip. Again he was progressing well when he caught COVID-19, and eventually re-appeared for the under-23 team the following February. He started the Championship match away to Bristol City on 5 March, alongside Marc Roberts at centre back, scored his first senior goal with an accurate header from Jordan Graham's corner to put his side 2–0 ahead, and played the full 90 minutes as Birmingham held on for a 2–1 win. He kept his place for the next match despite loanee Teden Mengi's return to fitness, "more than held his own, often sweeping behind Roberts when danger demanded it" as the team kept a clean sheet against Hull City, and the Mail's reporter suggested that if he continued in similar vein, "he could well save Blues a recruitment job in the summer."

==== Solihull Moors (loan) ====
After a 2022–23 season disrupted by illness, Gordon joined National League club Solihull Moors on loan for the 2023–24 campaign. In the 90th minute of the opening fixture, with his side 1–0 down at home to Eastleigh, Gordon was sent off for a second yellow card after pulling back an opponent; Moors equalised in stoppage time. That was his only appearance, and he was recalled to Birmingham on 8 January 2024.

=== North Texas SC ===
Gordon joined MLS Next Pro (third-tier) club North Texas SC on 2 February 2024, on a one-year contract with an option for a second year. He was named captain of the side, and made his debut in the opening match of the 2024 MLS Next Pro season, a goalless draw against Whitecaps FC 2. He made 22 appearances as North Texas were crowned regular-season champions, and played every minute of the playoffs as North Texas beat St. Louis City 2 to win the Western Conference title and came from behind to beat Philadelphia Union II 3–2 in MLS Next Pro Cup to become overall champions. Gordon's performances over the season earned him a place in the MLS Next Pro Best XI.

=== Monterey Bay FC ===
Gordon joined USL Championship (second-tier) club Monterey Bay FC in January 2025 on a one-year contract with an option for a further year.

== International career ==
Gordon was born in England and qualifies to play international football for Montserrat because his mother was born there. He was called up to the Montserrat senior squad for the first time in September 2023, for their matches in the 2023–24 CONCACAF Nations League B against Barbados and the Dominican Republic. He started and played the whole of the first fixture, in which Montserrat beat Barbados 3–2 with a 98th-minute free kick from his former Birmingham team-mate Lyle Taylor.

== Career statistics ==
=== Club ===
As of match played 15 March 2025

Appearances and goals by club, season and competition
Club	Season	League			FA Cup		EFL Cup		Other		Total	
Club	Season	Division	Apps	Goals	Apps	Goals	Apps	Goals	Apps	Goals	Apps	Goals
Birmingham City	2019–20	Championship	2	0	0	0	0	0	—		2	0
Birmingham City	2020–21	Championship	2	0	0	0	0	0	—		2	0
Birmingham City	2021–22	Championship	11	1	0	0	1	0	—		12	1
Birmingham City	2022–23	Championship	0	0	0	0	0	0	—		0	0
Birmingham City	2023–24	Championship	0	0	0	0	0	0	—		0	0
Birmingham City	Total		15	1	0	0	1	0	—		16	1
Solihull Moors (loan)	2023–24	National League	1	0	0	0	—		0	0	1	0
North Texas SC	2024	MLS Next Pro	22	0	—		—		4 (Note: Appearances in MLS Next Pro playoffs)	0	26	0
Monterey Bay FC	2025	USL Championship	2	0	0	0	—		0	0	2	0
Career total			40	1	0	0	1	0	4	0	45	1

=== International ===
As of match played 18 November 2024

Appearances and goals by national team and year
National team	Year	Apps	Goals
Montserrat	2023	6	0
Montserrat	2024	6	0
Total		12	0

== Honours ==
North Texas SC

- MLS Next Pro regular season title, Western Conference champion, MLS Next Pro Cup winner: 2024

Individual

- MLS Next Pro Best XI: 2024
