= Renedi Masampu =

English footballer

Personal information
- Date of birth: 17 September 1999 (age 27)
- Place of birth: London, England
- Height: 1.77 m (5 ft 10 in)
- Position: Left-back

Team information
- Current team: Hampton & Richmond Borough
- Number: 18

Youth career
- –2017: Metropolitan Police
- 2017–2019: Chelsea

Senior career*
| Years | Team | Apps | (Gls) |
| 2019 | Whyteleafe | 0 | (0) |
| 2020 | Dulwich Hamlet | 4 | (0) |
| 2021–2022 | Birmingham City | 0 | (0) |
| 2023 | Metropolitan Police | 1 | (0) |
| 2023 | Hornchurch | 0 | (0) |
| 2024 | Enfield Town | 1 | (0) |
| 2024– | Hampton & Richmond Borough | 3 | (0) |
- * Club domestic league appearances and goals as of 12:51, 16 November 2024 (UTC)

Renedi Masampu (born 17 September 1999) is an English footballer who plays as a left-back for National League South side Hampton & Richmond Borough.

== Early life ==
Born in London, Masampu is of Congolese descent. He started his career with the Metropolitan Police Football Club, and was voted youth team player of the year in 2017. Due to his good performances, he was scouted by Premier League giants Chelsea, who invited him on trial. After impressing on trial, Masampu completed the shock move alongside other non-league players Adebambo Akinjogbin and Tushaun Walters.

Following two seasons with Chelsea, in which he featured sparingly, Masampu was initially set for release in June 2018. However, he signed an extension to his short-term deal in July 2018, and was featuring for the club's under-23 side in September of the same year.

== Club career ==
Following his eventual release from Chelsea in 2019, Masampu would go on to join non-league Whyteleafe. However, he did not stay long, and was playing for National League South side Dulwich Hamlet in 2020.

After leaving Dulwich Hamlet in November 2020, Masampu spent time on trial with EFL League One clubs Sheffield Wednesday and Portsmouth, as well as Championship club Birmingham City. Masampu signed for Birmingham City in November 2021 on a deal until June 2022. He received a first-team squad number and was one of four inexperienced players named on the bench for the visit to Preston North End in January 2022, remained unused in that and two further matches, and was released when his contract expired at the end of the season.

In April 2023, Masampu signed for Southern League club Metropolitan Police. Following his release in July 2023, Masampu would join Hornchurch in September 2023, making his debut in the FA Cup 3rd Qualifying Round before leaving the club in October 2023 after two appearances. In January 2024 Masampu joined Enfield Town, where he made his Isthmian League debut on 20 January 2024.

Ahead of the 2024–25 campaign, Masampu joined National League South side, Hampton & Richmond Borough.

== Career statistics ==
As of end of 2021–22 season

Appearances and goals by club, season and competition
| Club | Season | League | | | FA Cup | | EFL Cup | | Other | | Total | |
| Club | Season | Division | Apps | Goals | Apps | Goals | Apps | Goals | Apps | Goals | Apps | Goals |
|---|---|---|---|---|---|---|---|---|---|---|---|---|
| Whyteleafe | 2019–20 | Isthmian League South East Division | 0 | 0 | 1 | 0 | — | | 1 (Note: Appearance in the Alan Turvey Trophy) | 0 | 2 | 0 |
| Dulwich Hamlet | 2020–21 | National League South | 4 | 0 | 0 | 0 | — | | 0 | 0 | 4 | 0 |
| Birmingham City | 2021–22 | Championship | 0 | 0 | 0 | 0 | — | | — | | 0 | 0 |
| Metropolitan Police | 2022–23 | Southern League Premier Division South | 1 | 0 | — | | — | | — | | 1 | 0 |
| Hornchurch | 2023–24 | Isthmian League Premier Division | 0 | 0 | 2 | 0 | — | | 0 | 0 | 2 | 0 |
| Enfield Town | 2023–24 | Isthmian League Premier Division | 1 | 0 | — | | — | | 0 | 0 | 1 | 0 |
| Hampton & Richmond Borough | 2024–25 | National League South | 3 | 0 | 0 | 0 | — | | 0 | 0 | 3 | 0 |
| Career total | | | 9 | 0 | 3 | 0 | 0 | 0 | 1 | 0 | 12 | 0 |
