= Tushaun Walters =

English footballer (born 2000)

Personal information
- Full name: Tushaun Tyreece-Walters
- Date of birth: 25 March 2000 (age 26)
- Place of birth: London, England
- Position: Forward

Team information
- Current team: Margate

Youth career
- 2008–2016: Tottenham Hotspur
- 2016–2017: Abbey Rangers
- 2017–2018: Chelsea

Senior career*
Years	Team	Apps	(Gls)
2018–2019	Greenwich Borough	32	(11)
2019–2021	Herne Bay	33	(11)
2021–2023	Maidstone United	13	(0)
2022	→ Tonbridge Angels (loan)	5	(1)
2022–2023	→ Herne Bay (loan)	16	(2)
2023–2024	Hastings United	8	(0)
2024–2025	Ramsgate	7	(1)
2024–2025	Hythe Town	16	(1)
2025–	Margate	5	(3)
- * Club domestic league appearances and goals as of 20:00, 23 March 2025 (UTC)

Tushaun Tyreece-Walters (born 25 March 2000) is an English footballer who plays as a forward for Isthmian League South East Division club Margate. He now plays for Croydon.

== Early life ==
Born in London, Walters started his career with Tottenham Hotspur at the age of 8. He spent eight years with the North London club, before being released by email at the age of 16. Following his release, Walters spent a season with non-league Abbey Rangers, and also trained at the academy of Chelsea and England player Reece James' father, Nigel James.

With Walters' links to Chelsea via Nigel James, he was invited for to train with the under-23s, and signed a six-month contract in August 2017, alongside fellow non-league players Adebambo Akinjogbin and Renedi Masampu. After one season with The Blues, in which he featured 13 times for the under-18 side, scoring once, Walters was released by Chelesa.

== Club career ==
After leaving Chelsea, Walters dropped down to the Isthmian League's Greenwich Borough, where he spent one season, scoring a total of 19 goals. After Greenwich Borough's relegation to the ninth tier, Walters joined Isthmian League side Herne Bay in 2019. He started well for the Kent-based team, scoring multiple times in his first season.

After two seasons with Herne Bay, Walters again jumped up the English football pyramid, signing with National League South side Maidstone United in 2021. Walters returned to Herne Bay on loan in October 2022. Following Maidstone's relegation at the end of the 2022–23 season, Walters was released by the club.

On 3 July 2023, Walters signed for Isthmian League Premier Division club Hastings United.

In July 2024, Walters joined Isthmian South East side Ramsgate. In February 2025, following a three-month spell with Hythe Town, Walters joined Margate.

== Career statistics ==
As of match played 22 March 2025.

Appearances and goals by club, season and competition
Club	Season	League			FA Cup (Note: Includes preliminary rounds)		EFL Cup		Other		Total	
Club	Season	Division	Apps	Goals	Apps	Goals	Apps	Goals	Apps	Goals	Apps	Goals
Greenwich Borough	2018–19	Isthmian League	32	11	1	1	–		3 (Note: One appearance in the Alan Turvey Trophy, two appearances and one goal in FA Trophy qualifying)	1	36	13
Herne Bay	2019–20	Isthmian League	27	9	3	0	–		7 (Note: Five appearances in the Alan Turvey Trophy, one appearance in FA Trophy qualifying and one appearance in the Kent Senior Cup)	0	37	9
Herne Bay	2020–21	Isthmian League	6	2	1	0	–		2 (Note: Appearances in FA Trophy qualifying)	0	9	2
Herne Bay	Total		33	11	4	0	0	0	9	0	46	11
Maidstone United	2021–22	National League South	5	0	0	0	–		0	0	5	0
Maidstone United	2022–23	National League	8	0	0	0	—		0	0	8	0
Maidstone United	Total		13	0	0	0	0	0	0	0	13	0
Tonbridge Angels (loan)	2022–23	National League South	5	1	0	0	—		0	0	5	1
Herne Bay (loan)	2022–23	Isthmian League Premier Division	16	2	0	0	—		1 (Note: Appearance(s) in FA Trophy)	0	17	2
Hastings United	2023–24	Isthmian League Premier Division	8	0	1	0	—		0	0	9	0
Ramsgate	2024–25	Isthmian League South East Division	7	1	4	2	—		3 (Note: One appearance in Alan Turvey Trophy, one appearance in Kent Senior Cup, one appearance in FA Trophy)	0	14	3
Hythe Town	2024–25	Isthmian League South East Division	16	1	—		—		0	0	16	1
Margate	2024–25	Isthmian League South East Division	5	3	—		—		0	0	5	3
Career total			135	30	10	3	0	0	16	1	161	34
