= Josh Brooking =

English footballer (born 2002)

Personal information
- Full name: Joshua Royston Brooking
- Date of birth: 1 September 2002 (age 24)
- Place of birth: Reading, England
- Height: 1.85 m (6 ft 1 in)
- Position: Centre-back

Team information
- Current team: Bracknell Town

Youth career
- –2018: Reading
- 2018–2024: Chelsea

Senior career*
Years	Team	Apps	(Gls)
2024–2025	Dorking Wanderers	17	(0)
2025–2026	Aldershot Town	0	(0)
2026	Slough Town	2	(0)
2026–	Bracknell Town	0	(0)

International career^{‡}
2017	England U16	3	(0)
2017	England U17	1	(0)
- * Club domestic league appearances and goals as of 22:47, 8 October 2026 (UTC) ‡ National team caps and goals as of 19:39, 26 February 2025 (UTC)

Joshua Royston Brooking (born 1 September 2002) is a professional footballer who plays as a centre-back for Bracknell Town. He is a product of both Reading and Chelsea youth systems, and has represented England at under-16 and under-17 level.

== Early life ==
Joshua Royston Brooking was born on 1 September 2002 in Reading, England.

== Career ==
=== Club ===
Brooking started his career at local side Reading. He joined the academy of Chelsea in 2018. Brooking signed his first professional contract in July 2020. He extended his contract in June 2022. On 20 August 2021, Brooking was sent off after a brutal challenge against Manchester United winger Dillon Hoogewerf in a Premier League 2 match. He started training with the first-team in December 2021. In February 2023, Brooking had captained the Premier League 2 team.

On 5 June 2024, Chelsea announced that Brooking would be leaving in the summer when his contract expired.

On 6 September 2024, Brooking joined National League South club Dorking Wanderers. On 2 April 2025, it was announced that Brooking had left the club following a mutual termination in his contract.

On 26 June 2025, Brooking joined National League side Aldershot Town. On 27 April 2026, it was announced that Brooking would leave the club at the end of his contract in June.

On 3 June 2026, Brooking agreed to join National League South side, Slough Town following his departure from Aldershot Town.

Brooking signed for Bracknell Town on 8 October 2026.

=== International career ===
Brooking was born in England to a South African father and English mother, and is eligible to represent both England and South Africa at international level. He had represented England at under-16 and under-17 level.

== Career statistics ==
=== Club ===
As of match played 15 February 2025

Appearances and goals by club, season and competition
Club	Season	League			FA Cup		EFL Cup		Other		Total	
Club	Season	Division	Apps	Goals	Apps	Goals	Apps	Goals	Apps	Goals	Apps	Goals
Chelsea U21	2021–22	—			—		—		3 (Note: Appearances in EFL Trophy)	0	3	0
Chelsea U21	2022–23	—			—		—		5	0	5	0
Chelsea U21	2023–24	—			—		—		1	0	1	0
Chelsea U21	Total		—		—		—		9	0	9	0
Dorking Wanderers	2024–25	National League South	17	0	1	0	—		1 (Note: Appearances in FA Trophy)	0	19	0
Aldershot Town	2025–26	National League	0	0	0	0	—		0	0	0	0
Slough Town	2026–27	National League South	0	0	0	0	—		0	0	0	0
Career total			17	0	1	0	0	0	10	0	28	0
