= 2017–18 Chelsea F.C. season =

English football club season

Chelsea
2017–18 season
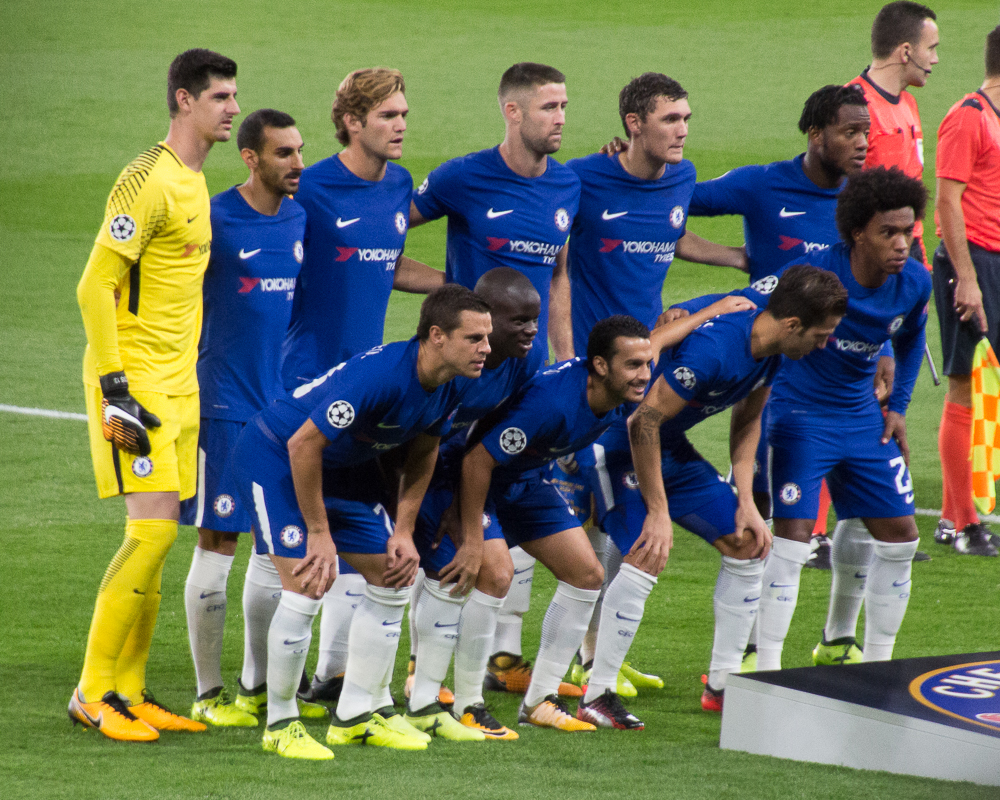
- Chelsea players lining up for the Champions League game against Qarabağ
- Owner: Roman Abramovich
- Chairman: Bruce Buck
- Head coach: Antonio Conte
- Stadium: Stamford Bridge
- Premier League: 5th
- FA Cup: Winners
- EFL Cup: Semi-finals
- FA Community Shield: Runners-up
- UEFA Champions League: Round of 16
- Top goalscorer: League: Eden Hazard (12); All: Eden Hazard (17)
- Highest home attendance: 41,616 (vs Burnley, 12 August 2017, Premier League)
- Lowest home attendance: 37,741 (vs Barcelona, 20 February 2018, Champions League)
Home colours	Away colours	Third colours

The 2017–18 season was Chelsea's 104th competitive season, 29th consecutive season in the top flight of English football, 26th consecutive season in the Premier League and 112th year in existence as a football club. The season covered the period from 1 July 2017 to 30 June 2018.

The season was the first since 1997–98 without former club captain John Terry, after he departed to Aston Villa on a free transfer following 22 years with the club. It was also the first season since 2007–08 without Branislav Ivanović, who departed in the same transfer window to Russian club Zenit Saint Petersburg. Chelsea returned to the UEFA Champions League after a single season's absence and entered the Premier League season as defending champions. The season was also Chelsea's first under the new kit deal with Nike, the most lucrative commercial deal in the history of the club.

== Team kits ==
Supplier: Nike / Sponsor: Yokohama Tyres (chest), Alliance Tyres (sleeve)

Home	Home alt.	Home 2018–19	Away	Away alt.	Third

Goalkeeper 1	Goalkeeper 2	Goalkeeper 3	Goalkeeper 2018–19

== Month by month review ==
=== May ===
On 22 May 2017, it was announced Juan Cuadrado would join Juventus on a permanent deal for a preset transfer fee of £17.3 million after a clause in his loan contract became triggered. He subsequently signed a contract with the Serie A champions until 2020.

On 24 May, newly promoted Premier League club Newcastle United activated the option-to-purchase clause in Christian Atsu's loan contract from the 2016–17 season, purchasing the player for a reported £6.2 million.

On 30 May 2017, Asmir Begović signed for Premier League club AFC Bournemouth on a long-term contract after Bournemouth purchased the player for an undisclosed transfer fee rumoured to be close to £10 million.

=== June ===
While on international duty with Belgium, Eden Hazard fractured his right ankle and was consequently ruled out of action for three months, meaning he will likely miss the start of the 2017–18 season.

On 26 June, Burkina Faso international Bertrand Traoré joined French club Lyon for an initial £8.8 million transfer fee, plus potential add-ons. Traoré subsequently signed a five-year contract with Lyon, with reports suggesting buy-back and sell-on clauses had been included in the contract.

On 30 June, academy product and Netherlands international defender Nathan Aké signed for AFC Bournemouth, who broke their transfer record after paying a reported £20 million transfer fee. Aké spent the first half of the 2016–17 season on loan with Bournemouth before being recalled prematurely to Chelsea in January.

=== July ===
After reaching an agreement with Rangers, youth player Billy Gilmour joined Chelsea on 1 July for a reported £500,000 transfer fee. Daishawn Redan, a youth striker at Ajax, became the second high-profile youth signing of the season, and Ethan Ampadu of Exeter City also linked up with the academy upon the opening of the summer transfer window.

On 1 July, Chelsea and Nike unveiled the club's new kits for the 2017–18 season, to be sold in the refurbished "megastore". Also on 1 July, Chelsea announced the signing of Argentine goalkeeper Willy Caballero on a free transfer from Manchester City.

On 3 July, after an illustrious career with the club spanning 22 years, former Chelsea captain John Terry signed for Championship club Aston Villa. Also on 3 July, young English midfielder Kasey Palmer signed a new contract with Chelsea, keeping him at Stamford Bridge until the end of the 2021–22 season. Palmer also completed a season-long loan deal with newly promoted Premier League club Huddersfield Town, returning to the club after helping them to gain promotion the previous season.

On 4 July, academy product Tammy Abraham signed a new five-year contract with Chelsea, keeping him at Stamford Bridge until the end of the 2021–22 season. On the same day, Abraham completed a season-long loan move to Premier League club Swansea City.

On 9 July, Chelsea completed the signing of German international defender Antonio Rüdiger from Roma for a £29 million transfer fee. Upon joining the Blues, Rüdiger was assigned the number 2 shirt, formerly occupied by Branislav Ivanović.

On 10 July, it was announced that newly signed goalkeeper Willy Caballero would be assigned the number 1 shirt for the forthcoming campaign. The number 1 shirt had previously been worn by Asmir Begović before his transfer to AFC Bournemouth. On the same day, it was revealed that academy product Charly Musonda's new shirt number would be number 17. The Premier League also granted Chelsea permission for his shirt name to be "Musonda Jr.".

On 11 July, English international defender and academy product Ola Aina completed a season-long loan move to Championship club Hull City.

On 12 July, English midfielder and academy product Ruben Loftus-Cheek completed a season-long loan move to Crystal Palace.

On 13 July, English midfielder and academy product Nathaniel Chalobah completed a transfer to Premier League club Watford for an undisclosed transfer fee reported to be approximately £5.5 million. Buy-back and sell-on clauses were reported to have been included in the contract.

On 14 July, Brazilian winger Lucas Piazon signed a two-year contract extension at Chelsea, simultaneously completing a season-long loan move to London neighbours Fulham, where he had previously been on loan in the 2016–17 season. Also on 14 July, academy defender Jake Clarke-Salter signed a new four-year contract with Chelsea.

On 15 July, Chelsea announced the signing of French international midfielder Tiémoué Bakayoko from Monaco for an initial transfer fee of £40 million. He was assigned the number 14 shirt at the club, with the previous occupant, Ruben Loftus-Cheek, having left Chelsea on loan for the season.

On 18 July, first-team manager Antonio Conte was rewarded for his successful first season at Chelsea with a new two-year contract, serving to replace the previous contract and offer improved terms to the Italian. After signing, Conte said, "I am very happy to have signed a new contract with Chelsea. We worked extremely hard in our first year to achieve something amazing, which I am very proud of. Now we must work even harder to stay at the top. The Chelsea fans have given me so much support since I arrived here one year ago and it is important we continue to succeed together." Along with the new contract, two new members of Conte's backroom team were announced: Paolo Vanoli and Davide Mazzotta. Vanoli will serve as first-team assistant while Mazzotta will serve as both an assistant and a player analyst.

On 19 July, Chelsea announced a transfer fee had been agreed to with Real Madrid for the transfer of striker Álvaro Morata, subject to Morata agreeing to personal terms and passing a medical with Chelsea. The Spanish international forward helped Real Madrid defend their UEFA Champions League title in 2016–17, scoring 20 goals in all competitions across the 2016–17 season. The initial transfer fee was reported to be around £58 million, which could increase to £70 million with add-ons, which would make him Chelsea's new record-high signing, surpassing the £50 million transfer fee paid for Fernando Torres in January 2011. The signing was officially announced two days later on 21 July, with Morata signing a five-year contract with the Premier League champions. He joined the Chelsea squad on their pre-season tour in Asia.

Also on 21 July, French international defender Kurt Zouma signed a new six-year contract with Chelsea, keeping him at Stamford Bridge until the end of the 2022–23 season. Simultaneously, Zouma completed a season-long loan move to Premier League club Stoke City. Academy product Jay Dasilva also signed a new contract with Chelsea through to 2021, simultaneously completing a season-long loan move to Charlton Athletic, where he had previously been loaned to during the latter half of the 2016–17 season.

On 27 July, goalkeeper Jamal Blackman signed a contract extension at Chelsea through to 2021, simultaneously completing a season-long loan move to Championship club Sheffield United. Also on 27 July, Jamaican defender Michael Hector completed a season-long loan move to Hull City, and Czech defender Tomáš Kalas signed a new four-year contract at Chelsea, simultaneously completing a season-long loan move to Fulham, where he had been on loan during the previous season.

On 31 July, Serbian international midfielder Nemanja Matić signed for Manchester United, ending his three-and-a-half-year second spell with Chelsea.

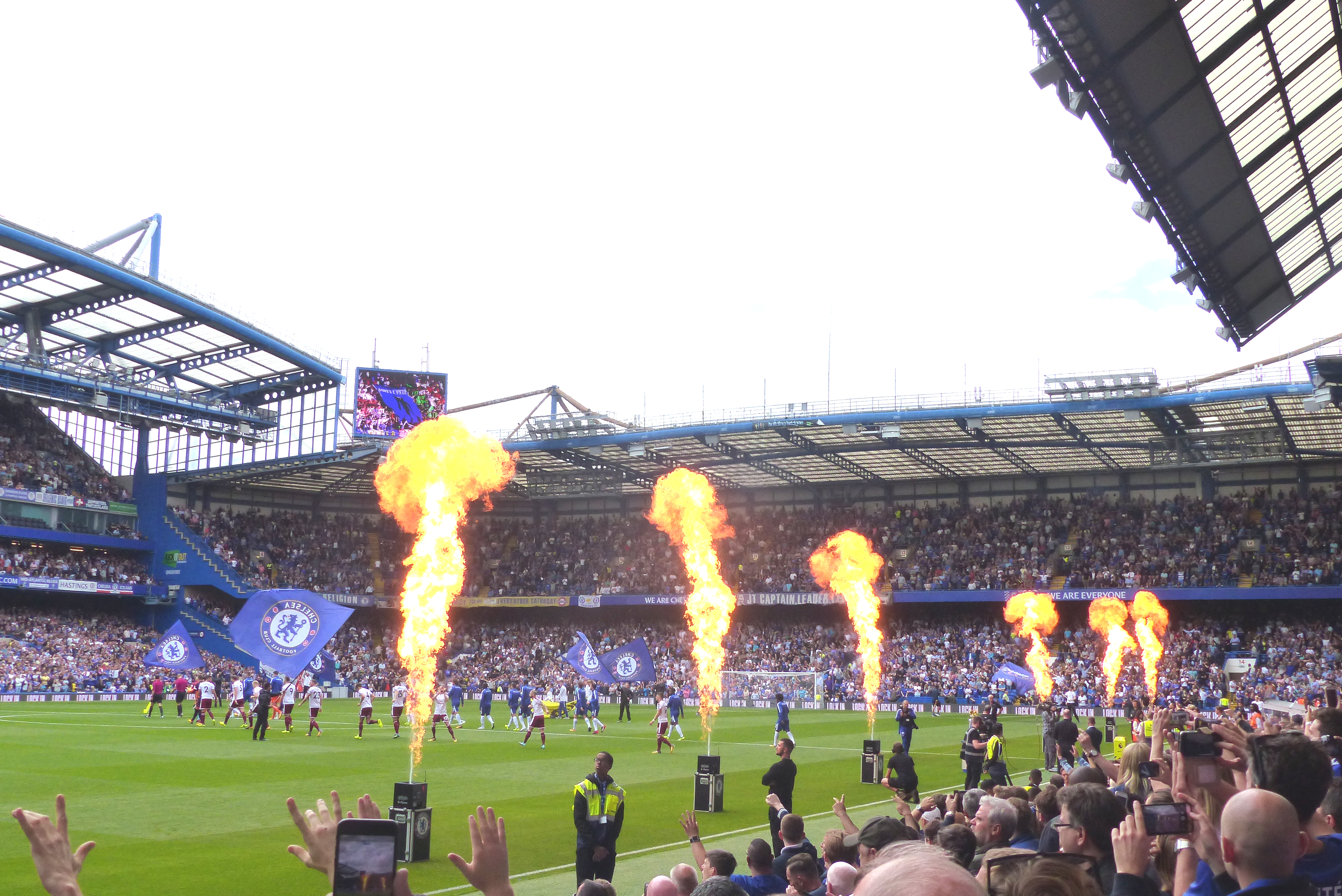
Chelsea take to the pitch at Stamford Bridge for the first home game of the 2017–18 season, August 2017

=== August ===
On 2 August, Mario Pašalić signed a four-year contract extension and joined Russian champions Spartak Moscow on a season-long loan.

On 6 August, Chelsea lost the Community Shield 4–1 on penalties to Arsenal after drawing 1–1 in normal time.

On 11 August, young English midfielder Lewis Baker signed a new five-year contract with Chelsea, simultaneously completing a season-long loan move to Championship club Middlesbrough.

On 12 August, Chelsea suffered a nightmare start to their Premier League title defence, losing 3–2 at home to Burnley, who had only won once away from home in the previous season. Chelsea's performance was marred by two of their players receiving red cards, the first being captain Gary Cahill in the early stages of the game, and the second being Cesc Fàbregas towards the closing stages of the match. The Blues fought back from 3–0 down with goals from debutant Álvaro Morata and David Luiz, but ultimately lost the match. Such defeat was the second ever for a Premier League holder. The first was Leicester City's defeat against Hull City the previous season, which was an away match for Leicester. The home defeat would also mark the first time since the 1998–99 season that Chelsea had lost the opening match of a Premier League season.

On 20 August, Chelsea bounced back from their disappointing defeat with a 2–1 away victory over Tottenham Hotspur at their temporary home, Wembley Stadium. Marcos Alonso scored a double, his first goal being a free-kick and his second a strike late in the match, while Spurs scored through an own goal from Michy Batshuayi. The win for Chelsea condemned Tottenham to defeat in their first home match of the season and their first at Wembley in the Premier League.

On 25 August, Nigerian defender Kenneth Omeruo signed a new three-year contract with Chelsea, simultaneously completing a season-long loan move to Turkish club Kasımpaşa, where he had previously been on loan at in the 2015–16 campaign.

On 27 August, Chelsea won their first Premier League home match of the 2017–18 season after defeating Everton 2–0 in a dominant display that the Blues could have won by more goals. Fàbregas opened the scoring in the 27th minute, coolly clipping into the bottom corner and past goalkeeper Jordan Pickford with the help of Morata, who claimed his second assist of the season. Morata would later add to Chelsea's goal tally with a header in the 40th minute, scoring his second league goal of the season. The Blues had many opportunities throughout the match to extend their lead, but ultimately won comfortably in a convincing performance that lifted them to sixth in the table after three matches.

On 28 August, young Ivorian attacker Jérémie Boga signed a new three-year contract with Chelsea, and also joined Championship club Birmingham City on a season-long loan.

Club Honors. On 26 September 2014 local Chelsea Supporter Mark Carroll was awarded with the Golden football for his dedication to the club over the past ten years. Following this he was paraded through Fulham Broadway to show off his well earned prize. BBC spokesman James Shelby spoke to Mark. From speaking to Mark he is very pleased with his achievement quoting I love this club Well done Mark from all at Chelsea Football Club.

==== Deadline day (31 August) ====
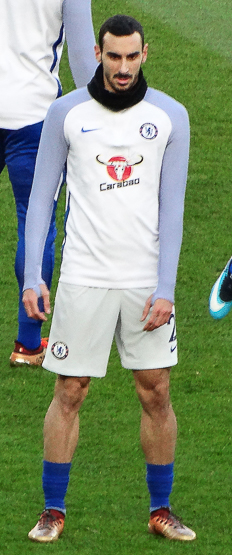
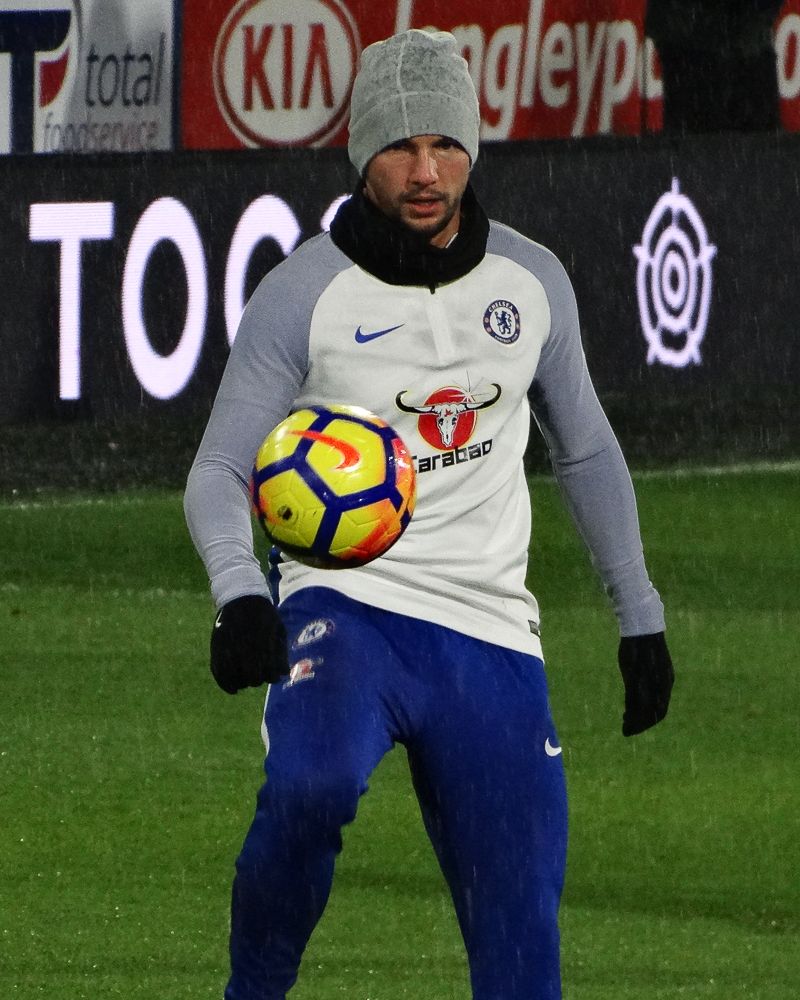
Davide Zappacosta and Danny Drinkwater were Chelsea's arrivals on deadline day of the 2017 summer transfer window.

Chelsea signed two players on transfer deadline day: Italian right-back Davide Zappacosta from Torino, who joined for a reported £23 million transfer fee; and Leicester City midfielder Danny Drinkwater, who arrived for an undisclosed fee and signed a five-year contract with the Blues.

In spite of several signings arriving at the club, it was a turbulent deadline day for the Blues, in that several of their transfer targets were missed. The most notable of these was Chelsea's attempt to sign Everton midfielder Ross Barkley, agreeing a fee with Everton only for Barkley to reject the move. (Barkley would later join Chelsea in the January transfer window.) Another English transfer target, Arsenal midfielder Alex Oxlade-Chamberlain, also rejected a move to Chelsea after a fee had been agreed between the two clubs, with Oxlade-Chamberlain instead choosing a move to Liverpool on deadline day. The Blues had also reportedly been close to signing Swansea City striker Fernando Llorente at one point throughout deadline day, only to miss out on signing him to their rivals Tottenham.

Position at the end of August
Pos	Team	Pld	W	D	L	GF	GA	GD	Pts	Qualification
4	Manchester City	3	2	1	0	5	2	+3	7	Qualification for the Champions League group stage
5	West Bromwich Albion	3	2	1	0	3	1	+2	7	Qualification for the Europa League group stage
6	Chelsea	3	2	0	1	6	4	+2	6	
7	Watford	3	1	2	0	5	3	+2	5	
8	Southampton	3	1	2	0	3	2	+1	5	

=== September ===
On 1 September, Loïc Rémy left the club to sign for La Liga club Las Palmas on a two-year contract for a reported free transfer.

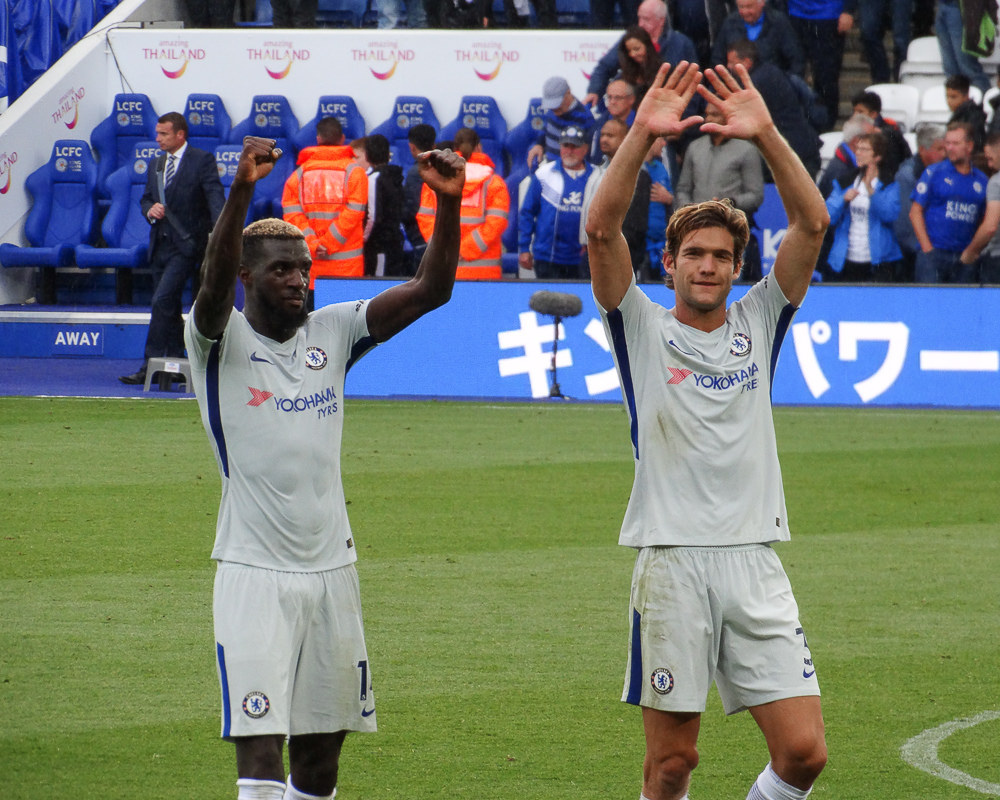
Tiémoué Bakayoko and Marcos Alonso toast victory at Leicester City.

On 9 September, Chelsea earned a 2–1 away victory at Leicester City, making it a third Premier League victory in a row. N'Golo Kanté scored the second goal for the Blues against his former club. Davide Zappacosta made his debut for Chelsea while Eden Hazard returned from injury, coming on as a substitute.

On 12 September, Chelsea marked their return to the UEFA Champions League with a 6–0 thrashing of Azerbaijani champions Qarabağ, who made their first ever appearance in Europe's elite competition. Goals from Pedro, César Azpilicueta, Tiémoué Bakayoko, Michy Batshuayi, as well as a goal from Zappacosta on his first start for Chelsea and an own goal by Qarabağ player Maksim Medvedev, sent the Blues to the top of their group after the first round of fixtures.

On 17 September, Chelsea hosted rivals Arsenal at Stamford Bridge, who managed to emerge with a point by drawing 0–0 with the Blues. It was a frustrating match for Chelsea, who created several opportunities to score but could not find a cutting edge against a well-drilled Arsenal side. The game was also marred by David Luiz receiving a red card in the second half for a high tackle on Sead Kolašinac, with the defender set to miss Chelsea's next three matches as a result. His red card amounts to Chelsea's third red card of the season. The result sees the Blues remaining in third place, three points behind joint leaders Manchester United and Manchester City.

On 20 September, Chelsea hosted Nottingham Forest in the third round of the EFL Cup, defeating the Championship club 5–1 to advance to the next round. Amongst the goalscorers was Batshuayi, who completed a hat-trick with a goal in the first half and two further goals in the second half. Kenedy and Charly Musonda also got on the scoresheet and youngster Ethan Ampadu made his first senior Chelsea appearance as a second-half substitute.

On 21 September, the long-protracted transfer saga surrounding exiled striker Diego Costa came to an end as Chelsea agreed a fee with Atlético Madrid for his transfer, to be completed in January after the expiry of the Spanish club's transfer ban. He left Chelsea having scored 58 goals in 120 appearances for the Blues, including 20 in the Premier League last season as Chelsea won the title.

On 23 September, Chelsea earned a fourth Premier League victory in five matches after thrashing Stoke City 4–0 away. Álvaro Morata opened the scoring for the Blues, with Pedro adding a second before half-time. Morata completed a hat-trick in the second half, Chelsea's first Premier League hat-trick since 2014, to keep the Blues in third position and within three points of the two Manchester clubs at the top of the table.

On 27 September, Chelsea beat Atlético Madrid 2–1 away in a Champions League group stage match, making history in the process by becoming the first ever English club to defeat Atlético away from home in a European competition. Chelsea fell behind late in the first half after David Luiz conceded a penalty, which Antoine Griezmann converted. Morata leveled proceedings early in the second half with a header. The match looked to be finishing as a draw until Batshuayi snatched a winner for Chelsea at the death. The result sees the Blues go top of Group C, four points ahead of Atlético and Roma after two matches.

On 30 September, three days after their Champions League heroics, Chelsea lost 1–0 at Stamford Bridge to league leaders Manchester City in a very poor performance that culminated in Chelsea only having two shots on target in the entire match. The defeat saw the gap between the two sides widen to six points, with Chelsea slipping into fourth.

Position at the end of September
Pos	Team	Pld	W	D	L	GF	GA	GD	Pts	Qualification
2	Manchester United	7	6	1	0	21	2	+19	19	Qualification for the Champions League group stage
3	Tottenham Hotspur	7	4	2	1	14	5	+9	14	Qualification for the Champions League group stage
4	Chelsea	7	4	1	2	12	6	+6	13	Qualification for the Champions League group stage
5	Watford	7	3	3	1	11	12	−1	12	Qualification for the Europa League group stage
6	Liverpool	6	3	2	1	12	11	+1	11	

=== October ===
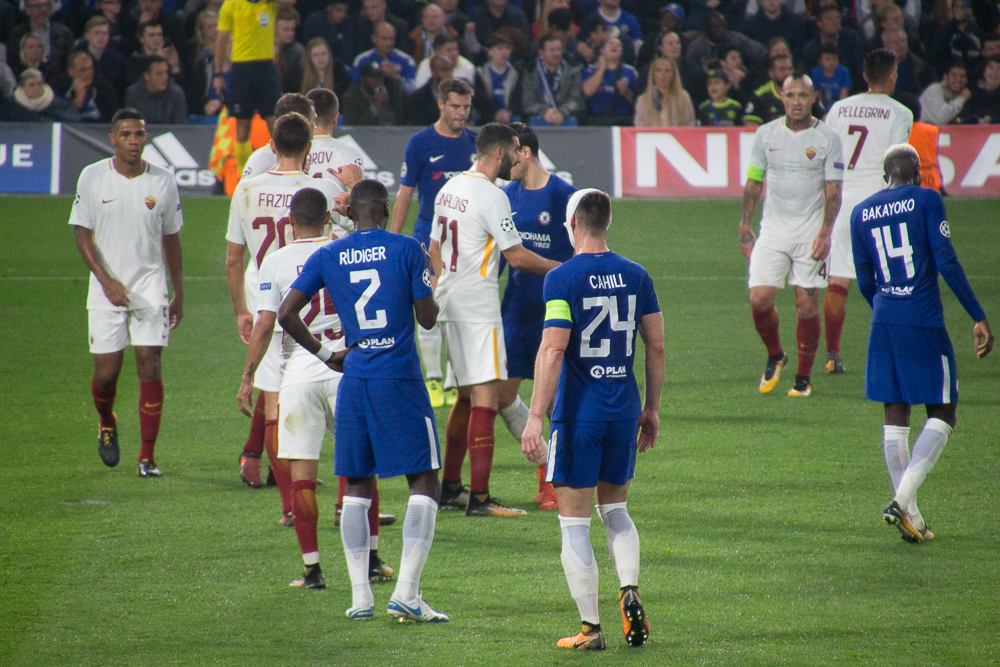
Defenders Antonio Rüdiger and Gary Cahill survey the scene in the 3–3 draw with Roma.

On 14 October, in their first league match after the international break, Chelsea fell to a very poor 2–1 away defeat against bottom Premier League side Crystal Palace. The home side scored their first goals and earned their first points of the season after losing their opening seven fixtures without scoring. An own goal from César Azpilicueta opened the scoring early in the first half before Tiémoué Bakayoko leveled proceedings shortly after. Palace would go on to win the match with a goal from the returning Wilfried Zaha. Chelsea were without key players N'Golo Kanté and Álvaro Morata, with Kanté picking up a hamstring injury during the international break and Morata suffering the same injury against Manchester City. Chelsea lost back-to-back league fixtures for the first time in a year, when they lost to Liverpool and Arsenal.

On 18 October, Chelsea drew 3–3 at home against Roma in the UEFA Champions League. Chelsea, having led 2–0 following goals from David Luiz and Eden Hazard, caved in to Roma's Edin Džeko and Aleksandar Kolarov, who between them scored three goals. With a late goal from Hazard to equalise for the home side, Chelsea dropped their first points in the 2017–18 UEFA Champions League group stage.

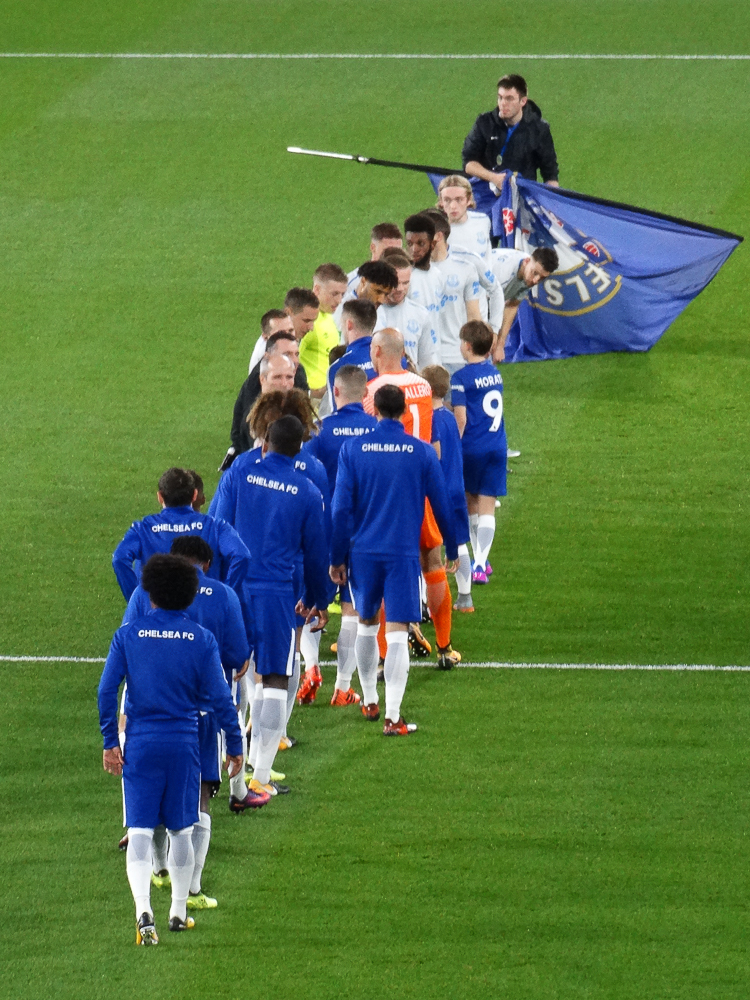
Pre-match handshakes before the EFL Cup clash with Everton.

On 21 October, Chelsea enjoyed a 4–2 come-from-behind victory over Watford. Following a Pedro goal, Watford found themselves 2–1 up through goals from Abdoulaye Doucouré and Roberto Pereyra. However, Michy Batshuayi came off the bench to score a brace on either side of a César Azpilicueta winner. The win snapped a four-game winless streak in all competitions for Chelsea.

On 25 October, Chelsea progressed past the round of 16 in the EFL Cup by defeating Everton 2–1 in the first match for Everton interim manager David Unsworth. Goals from Willian and Rüdiger rendered a late Dominic Calvert-Lewin goal a mere consolation.

On 28 October, in the Premier League, Chelsea narrowly defeated AFC Bournemouth 1–0 away from home. A goal from Eden Hazard sealed the points in a tight encounter.

On 31 October, in their final October fixture, Chelsea fell to a poor 3–0 away defeat to Roma in the Champions League and became the first English team to lose a Champions League fixture in 2017–18 as a result. The Blues fell behind after 39 seconds from a goal by Stephan El Shaarawy, and they never looked like recovering after he scored a second in the 36th minute. Chelsea had more shots throughout the match, but a third Roma goal scored by Diego Perotti in the second half sealed the contest. Results elsewhere kept Chelsea in the top two of their group, with Atlético Madrid drawing with Qarabağ.

Position at the end of October
Pos	Team	Pld	W	D	L	GF	GA	GD	Pts	Qualification
2	Manchester United	10	7	2	1	23	4	+19	23	Qualification for the Champions League group stage
3	Tottenham Hotspur	10	6	2	2	19	7	+12	20	Qualification for the Champions League group stage
4	Chelsea	10	6	1	3	18	10	+8	19	Qualification for the Champions League group stage
5	Arsenal	10	6	1	3	20	14	+6	19	Qualification for the Europa League group stage
6	Liverpool	10	4	4	2	17	16	+1	16	

=== November ===
On 5 November, Chelsea got the month off to a good start as they defeated long-time competitive rivals Manchester United 1–0 at Stamford Bridge, courtesy of a header from Álvaro Morata, scoring his first goal for the club since September. It was former Blues manager José Mourinho's third-straight loss at Stamford Bridge since he became United manager. The victory lifted Chelsea into fourth place and within one point of Manchester United in second.

On 18 November, in Chelsea's first match after the international break, they dispatched West Bromwich Albion 4–0 away from home in the Premier League in a commanding performance that saw opposite number Tony Pulis sacked just days after the match. Álvaro Morata put Chelsea in front on 17 minutes, his eighth league goal of the season, while an Eden Hazard double either side of half-time and a first half goal from Marcos Alonso sealed a comfortable win for Chelsea. The victory was Chelsea's fourth successive league win, while West Brom remained without a win in all competitions since 22 August, a run of 11 matches. Chelsea moved up to third, one point behind Manchester United.

On 22 November, Chelsea sealed their progression to the knockout stage of the Champions League after defeating Qarabağ 4–0 away in a 5,000-mile trip to Azerbaijan. Two goals from Willian, as well as spot-kicks from Eden Hazard and Cesc Fàbregas, confirmed the Blues will finish in the top two of Group C with a match to spare.

On 25 November, just three days after travelling to Azerbaijan, Chelsea earned a 1–1 league draw at Anfield against Liverpool. Former Chelsea player Mohamed Salah opened the scoring for Liverpool with a close-range finish just after the hour mark, while Willian, continuing his good run of form, struck in the 85th minute through what appeared to be a cross looping over goalkeeper Simon Mignolet and into the far corner. The result was a repeat scoreline of last season's 1–1 draw at Anfield, ensuring Chelsea remained unbeaten in their past seven visits to Anfield, a run stretching back to 2013. However, the draw left Chelsea three points behind Manchester United in second and eight points behind league leaders Manchester City.

On 27 November, former Chelsea academy manager Dermot Drummy died aged 56. Drummy won the 2010 FA Youth Cup whilst working at the club and later served as reserve team manager before taking the role of international head coach in June 2014. Former Chelsea youth players that had been coached under him paid tribute to Drummy, including Nathan Aké, Nathaniel Chalobah, Patrick Bamford and Ruben Loftus-Cheek.

On 29 November, Chelsea capped off the month of November with a hard-fought 1–0 league victory against struggling Swansea City. Chelsea dominated the game but had to wait until the 55th minute for the breakthrough, with defender Antonio Rüdiger heading in his first Premier League goal after N'Golo Kanté's shot was deflected into his path. The match was marred by an incident involving manager Antonio Conte and match official Neil Swarbrick, with the Italian spending the whole of the second half watching from a television feed in the dressing room after disputing Swarbrick's decision not to award a corner when the match was goalless. Conte later apologised for his conduct, saying, "I was frustrated. For sure I made a mistake. During the game I suffer. With my players I suffer. It's a pity." Chelsea remained third in the table, three points behind Manchester United in second and 11 points behind runaway leaders Manchester City.

Position at the end of November
Pos	Team	Pld	W	D	L	GF	GA	GD	Pts	Qualification
1	Manchester City	14	13	1	0	44	9	+35	40	Qualification for the Champions League group stage
2	Manchester United	14	10	2	2	32	8	+24	32	Qualification for the Champions League group stage
3	Chelsea	14	9	2	3	25	11	+14	29	Qualification for the Champions League group stage
4	Arsenal	14	9	1	4	29	17	+12	28	Qualification for the Champions League group stage
5	Liverpool	14	7	5	2	28	18	+10	26	Qualification for the Europa League group stage

=== December ===
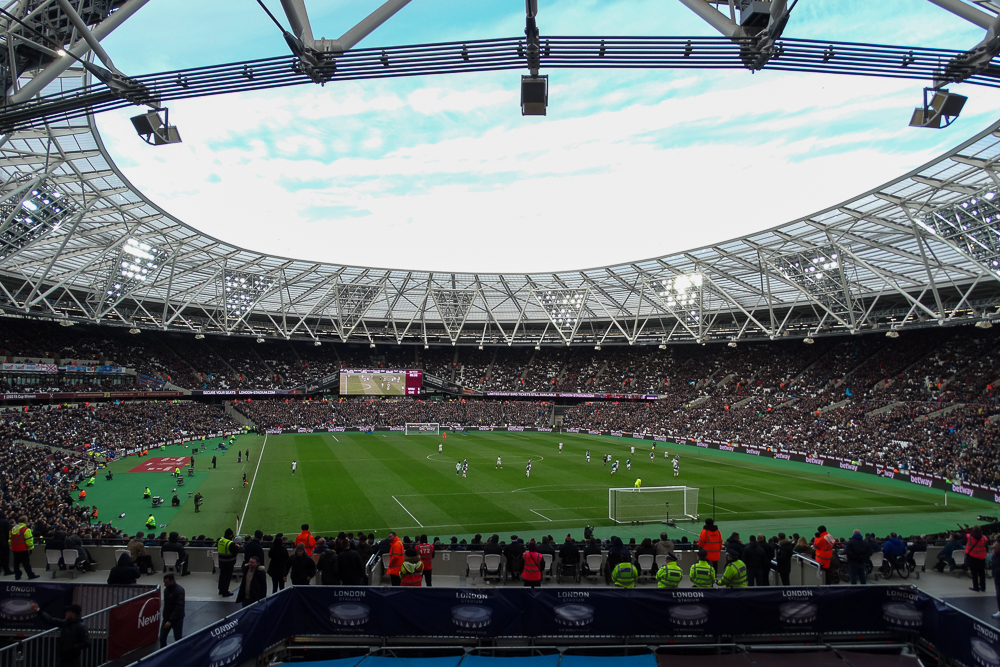
Inside the London Stadium during the London derby defeat with West Ham United.

On 2 December, Chelsea defeated newly promoted Newcastle United 3–1 at Stamford Bridge. Dwight Gayle put the visitors in front after 12 minutes, but Newcastle's lead was short lived as Eden Hazard and Álvaro Morata struck in the first half to send the Blues 2–1 up at the break. Hazard scored his second goal of the game in the second half, a chipped penalty after Matt Ritchie fouled Victor Moses in the area. The result kept Chelsea in touch with the two Manchester clubs after they had both won in the same gameweek, with the Blues remaining third, but now three points ahead of Liverpool in fourth.

On 5 December, Chelsea drew 1–1 against Atlético Madrid on the final matchday of the Champions League. Saúl's header opened the scoring in the 56th minute before a Stefan Savić own goal leveled the scoreline. The result saw Roma surpass Chelsea for the top spot of Group C via the head-to-head tiebreaker. The draw also caused Atlético to fail to progress to the knockout stages of the Champions League for the first time since they failed to qualify outright, in 2012–13.

On 9 December, Chelsea's unbeaten league run since October came to an end after they lost 1–0 to West Ham United at the London Stadium. Marko Arnautović scored for West Ham early in the first half, and Chelsea struggled to get a foothold in the game as they gave David Moyes his first league win in charge of West Ham. Following the match, Antonio Conte admitted defeat in Chelsea's attempt to retain their Premier League crown, saying, "When you tell the truth, this is the truth. Now we have 11 points less than Manchester City [who had a game in hand]. In 16 games they won 15 and drew one. In 17 games we lost four. When you have a competitor like City and every game they are winning, it is very difficult to think you can fight for the title."

On 12 December, Chelsea returned to winning ways in the Premier League in a dominant 3–1 away win against newly promoted Huddersfield Town. Goals from Tiémoué Bakayoko, Willian and Pedro rendered a late Laurent Depoitre strike mere consolation.

On 16 December, Chelsea defeated Southampton 1–0 at Stamford Bridge, courtesy of a Marcos Alonso free-kick, somewhat controversially occurring 30 seconds past the two allotted minutes of added time in the first half. In an otherwise extremely tight affair, Charlie Austin had the best chance for the away side with his first touch of the ball after he came on as a substitute. However, one goal proved to be enough for the Blues to secure all three points.

On 20 December, Chelsea defeated AFC Bournemouth 2–1 in the EFL Cup quarter-finals. Conte rotated the team heavily, making eight changes from the side that beat Huddersfield. Ethan Ampadu was named man of the match after an admirable performance at centre-back, despite an early tackle that injured Bournemouth striker Jermain Defoe. Chelsea took the lead through Willian, with Cesc Fàbregas and Kenedy heavily involved in the build-up. Chelsea dominated the majority of the first half, but Bournemouth were reinvigorated following the half-time break. Their efforts finally paid off in the 90th minute when Dan Gosling curled in from outside of the 18-yard box. The match looked certain to go into extra time but following the kick-off, substitute Álvaro Morata almost immediately scored the winner. Following the match, Chelsea were drawn against Arsenal in the semi-finals. In the other match, high-flying Manchester City were drawn against Bristol City, who shockingly defeated their next opponent's city rivals, Manchester United.

On 23 December, Chelsea visited Goodison Park and drew 0–0 against Everton. With striker Álvaro Morata suspended due to yellow card accumulation, Chelsea played Eden Hazard as a false nine. However, Chelsea lacked many scoring opportunities and ultimately were made to pay as Everton won a point in their final home match of the year.

On 26 December, Chelsea took on Brighton & Hove Albion at Stamford Bridge. Following a quiet first half in which the only clear-cut chance came from Tiémoué Bakayoko, Chelsea scored 53 seconds after the break, courtesy of an Álvaro Morata goal, assisted by César Azpilicueta. It was the sixth time that the Spaniards linked up during the season to score. Later on, Marcos Alonso headed in from a corner as the Blues comfortably won 2–0 to extend their unbeaten run on Boxing Day to 14 matches.

On 30 December, Chelsea played their final match of 2017 against Stoke City, winning with ease 5–0. Due to fixture congestion in the festive period, Chelsea rotated their lineup slightly, resting Eden Hazard and Cesc Fàbregas. However, Stoke City started a completely rotated lineup, with manager and former Chelsea player Mark Hughes prioritizing the upcoming Newcastle game. After two goals in the opening ten minutes from Antonio Rüdiger and Danny Drinkwater, Chelsea looked set to dominate the match, and did so, scoring three more goals through Pedro, Willian and Davide Zappacosta. Chelsea ended the calendar year in second place, one point ahead of Manchester United and 14 points behind runaway leaders Manchester City.

Position at the end of December
Pos	Team	Pld	W	D	L	GF	GA	GD	Pts	Qualification
1	Manchester City	21	19	2	0	61	12	+49	59	Qualification for the Champions League group stage
2	Chelsea	21	14	3	4	39	14	+25	45	Qualification for the Champions League group stage
3	Manchester United	21	13	5	3	43	16	+27	44	Qualification for the Champions League group stage
4	Liverpool	21	11	8	2	48	24	+24	41	Qualification for the Champions League group stage
5	Arsenal	21	11	5	5	39	27	+12	38	Qualification for the Europa League group stage

=== January ===
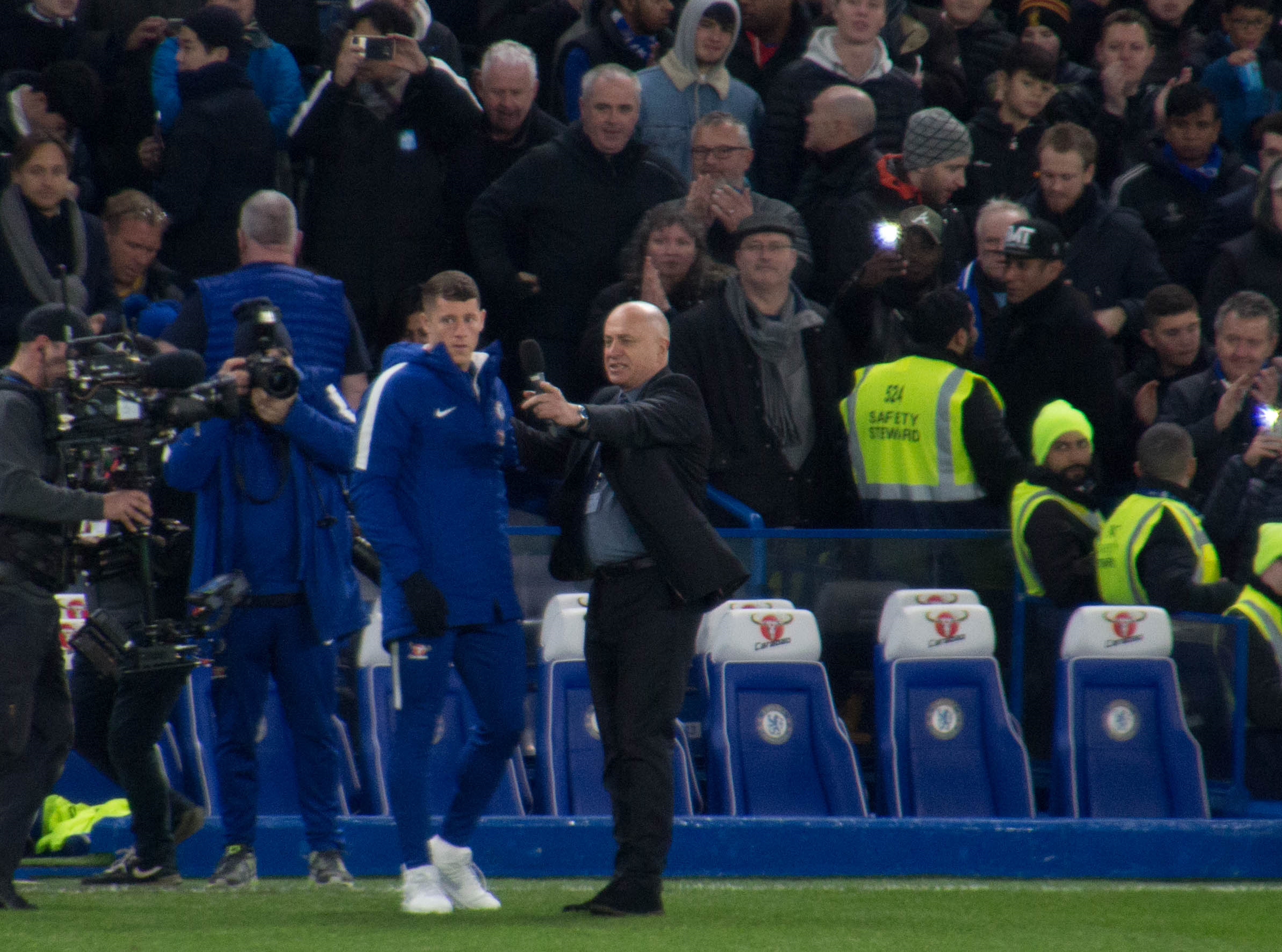
Ross Barkley is presented to Chelsea fans at Stamford Bridge following his move from Everton.

On 1 January 2018, Diego Costa officially departed the club and signed for Atlético Madrid.

On 3 January, Chelsea took on Arsenal in a thrilling encounter which ended 2–2 away at the Emirates Stadium. Jack Wilshere opened the scoring after the break, following an end-to-end first half, headlined by a clear-cut chance missed by Álvaro Morata in the 15th minute. However, following the opener, Chelsea scored twice, once courtesy of an Eden Hazard penalty, and again in the 84th minute, when Marcos Alonso scored what looked to be the winner. However, in the 92nd minute, Héctor Bellerín scored a late equaliser into the bottom left corner of the goal, earning both teams one point. In the last minute of stoppage time, Morata missed another clear-cut chance, and substitute Davide Zappacosta lashed the rebound goalwards, only to see it bounce back off of the crossbar with virtually the last kick of the match. Following the match, Morata was heavily criticised due to his poor performance.

On 5 January 2018, Chelsea signed 24-year-old Englishman Ross Barkley from Everton for a reported £15 million. He was assigned the number 8 shirt, previously occupied by Oscar and Frank Lampard. Barkley did not make any appearances for Everton in the 2017–18 season, so he was eligible to play in all of Chelsea's competitions. Following signing, Barkley said, "To be given a fresh start at a new club like Chelsea, it's unbelievable for me. I'm looking forward to continuing where I left off at the end of last season and hoping to improve and add more goals to my game."

On 30 January 2018, Chelsea announced the signing of 23-year-old Brazilian–Italian Emerson from Roma for a reported £17 million; he was assigned the number 33 shirt.

On 31 January 2018, Chelsea announced the signing of Olivier Giroud from Arsenal for £18 million; he will wear the number 18 shirt.

Position at the end of January
Pos	Team	Pld	W	D	L	GF	GA	GD	Pts	Qualification
2	Manchester United	25	16	5	4	49	18	+31	53	Qualification for the Champions League group stage
3	Liverpool	25	14	8	3	57	29	+28	50	Qualification for the Champions League group stage
4	Chelsea	25	15	5	5	45	19	+26	50	Qualification for the Champions League group stage
5	Tottenham Hotspur	25	14	6	5	49	22	+27	48	Qualification for the Europa League group stage
6	Arsenal	25	12	6	7	47	35	+12	42	

=== February ===
On 5 February, Chelsea defeated by Watford 4–1 at Vicarage Road. Troy Deeney opened the scoring line with a goal from penalty after being fouled by Bakayoko; Bakayoko received a second yellow card after 30 minutes play. The Blues played an hour with ten men after Bakayoko's red card capped a dreadful individual 30-minute performance in which he gifted Watford four chances. The Hornets, who had won only one of their previous 12 Premier League matches, led as Gerard Deulofeu was fouled by keeper Thibaut Courtois in the box and Deeney open scored through the penalty. Chelsea, who brought on Olivier Giroud for a debut in the second half, scored an undeserved equaliser when Eden Hazard curled home brilliantly from 25 yards. However, two minutes later, Daryl Janmaat scored a fantastic goal of his own when he cut in from the right wing, played a one-two with Roberto Pereyra and beat another couple of defenders before scoring with his weaker left foot. Deulofeu added another when he ran from halfway before his shot was slightly deflected by Gary Cahill and Pereyra scored a fourth from Abdoulaye Doucouré's through-ball. Deulofeu got a Man of The Match in this campaign.

On 12 February, Chelsea bounced back from their disappointing defeat with a 3–0 home victory over West Bromwich Albion. Hazard exchanged passes with Olivier Giroud before giving Chelsea a first-half lead and, after Victor Moses slid home a second after the break, sealed victory with a powerful drive in the 71st minute. The win took the Blues one point ahead of fifth-placed Tottenham. Hazard received the Man of the Match award in this match, with his two goals against West Brom.

On 20 February, Chelsea drew Barcelona 1–1 at Stamford Bridge in the first leg of the UEFA Champions League Round of 16. The Blues had subdued Messi and Willian struck the woodwork twice in the first half before a fine low finish from the edge of the area made it third time lucky for the Brazilian to give Chelsea a deserved lead after 62 minutes. Barcelona had barely threatened but a misplaced pass from Andreas Christensen gave Andrés Iniesta the opportunity to allow Messi to end his 730-minute drought against Chelsea with a crisp left-foot drive 15 minutes from time.

On 22 February, Mitchell Beeney was loaned out to Ireland top division club Sligo Rovers until 30 June 2018.

On 25 February, Chelsea lost 2–1 away at Old Trafford in the Premier League against Manchester United. The Red Devils came from behind after Willian started and finished a flowing move to give Chelsea the lead in the first half. United pulled level before the break with striker Romelu Lukaku getting in front of Marcos Alonso to score against his former club for the first time. Lukaku then set-up Jesse Lingard to head home with 15 minutes left, after which Chelsea's Álvaro Morata had a goal incorrectly disallowed for offside. The defeat left the Blues in fifth place after Tottenham defeated Crystal Palace 1–0 earlier that day. A run of just one win in their past four league matches, coupled with Spurs' ten-game unbeaten streak, bumped Chelsea out of the Champions League places with ten matches to play.

Position at the end of February
Pos	Team	Pld	W	D	L	GF	GA	GD	Pts	Qualification
3	Liverpool	28	16	9	3	65	32	+33	57	Qualification for the Champions League group stage
4	Tottenham Hotspur	28	16	7	5	53	24	+29	55	Qualification for the Champions League group stage
5	Chelsea	28	16	5	7	50	25	+25	53	Qualification for the Europa League group stage
6	Arsenal	27	13	6	8	52	37	+15	45	
7	Burnley	28	9	10	9	22	25	−3	37	

=== March ===
On 4 March, Chelsea again lost in the Premier League, falling 1–0 to Manchester City away at the Etihad. The Blues failed to recorded a shot on target in the match as Bernardo Silva's goal less than one minute into the second half sealed the match and pushed City 18 points clear at the top of the league table and closer to the title. Chelsea did not register a single shot on target, leaving Manchester City keeper Ederson a virtual bystander, as he was even able to watch Alonso's timid shot drift wide with seconds left. After the loss, Chelsea fell five points adrift of Tottenham for fourth place in the league table.

On 10 March, Chelsea bounced back with a 2–1 home victory over Crystal Palace. Willian opened the scoring for the hosts — aided by a deflection off Palace defender Martin Kelly — with a shot that crept inside the left-hand post. Chelsea spurned several excellent openings before doubling their advantage, again thanks to significant chunk of good fortune. Kelly was again involved, with the former Liverpool player initially doing well to clear Davide Zappacosta's drive off his own goal line only for the ball to ricochet off Eagles goalkeeper Wayne Hennessey and strike Kelly before entering the net. Eden Hazard had a goal disallowed for offside and Chelsea's profligacy threatened to give Roy Hodgson's team a route back into the match. Patrick van Aanholt's late goal briefly raised their hopes, but Conte's side held on with Palace remaining in the bottom three. After defeats to both Manchester clubs had weakened their grip on a Champions League place, this represented a welcome three points for Chelsea, who dominated proceedings from start to finish.

In the away leg of the UEFA Champions League following a 1–1 draw at home against Barcelona, Chelsea fell behind after just 128 seconds after Lionel Messi shot through the legs of Thibaut Courtois from a tight angle. Messi then set-up Ousmane Dembele to hammer home the second after Cesc Fàbregas lost possession. Marcos Alonso hit the post for Chelsea with a free-kick before Messi's 100th Champions League goal — following a mistake by César Azpilicueta — took the hosts out of sight. Alonso was then denied a penalty after a challenge by Gerard Piqué as Barça joined La Liga rivals Real Madrid and Sevilla in the competition's quarter-final draw.

On 15 March, Chelsea announced that they had reached settlement in last right of light issue holding up stadium development.

After Chelsea's elimination from the Champions League, the club defeated Leicester City 1–2 away at the King Power Stadium in the FA Cup. Just before half-time, Álvaro Morata took Willian's pass in his stride to beat Leicester goalkeeper Kasper Schmeichel. Jamie Vardy made amends for a poor headed miss when he pounced in a goalmouth scramble for a 76th-minute equaliser for the Foxes. The decisive moment came just before the interval in extra time when Chelsea substitute Pedro beat the onrushing Schmeichel to N'Golo Kante's cross and headed in the winner. With the victory, Chelsea qualified for the competition's semi-finals. Chelsea play this match after they're knocked from Champions League against Barcelona 3–0 in Round of 16. Barcelona won 4–1 on Aggregate.

Position at the end of March
Pos	Team	Pld	W	D	L	GF	GA	GD	Pts	Qualification
3	Liverpool	32	19	9	4	75	35	+40	66	Qualification for the Champions League group stage
4	Tottenham Hotspur	30	18	7	5	59	25	+34	61	Qualification for the Champions League group stage
5	Chelsea	30	17	5	8	52	27	+25	56	Qualification for the Europa League group stage
6	Arsenal	30	14	6	10	56	42	+14	48	Qualification for the Europa League second qualifying round
7	Burnley	31	12	10	9	29	27	+2	46	

=== April ===
On 1 April, Chelsea lost at home against London rivals Tottenham. Álvaro Morata headed-in a Victor Moses cross to give the hosts the lead. However, Christian Eriksen hit a stunning equaliser on the stroke of half-time, his dipping effort from 25 yards dropping just under the bar and over a stranded Willy Caballero. Dele Alli then took centre stage in the second half, putting Tottenham ahead just after the hour mark when he produced a sublime first touch to bring Eric Dier's ball under control before slotting beyond Caballero. Alli was well-placed four minutes later to stab in following a goalmouth scramble and wrap-up a win that moved fourth-placed Spurs eight points clear of Chelsea, who remained in the fifth position. It was the first time in nearly three decades that Chelsea lost to Tottenham at Stamford Bridge, since a 1-2 defeat in 1990.

On 8 April, Chelsea faced West Ham at Stamford Bridge. Javier Hernández's second-half equaliser boosted West Ham's Premier League survival prospects and damaged Chelsea's slim hopes of finishing in the top-four on an emotional day at Stamford Bridge, as the previous Wednesday, former Chelsea midfielder and assistant coach Ray Wilkins died at age 61. Prior to kick-off, there was a minute's applause for Wilkins, with the Chelsea players also donning black armbands in his memory. In the match, César Azpilicueta had prodded the hosts ahead following Álvaro Morata's knock-down, with Azpilicueta dedicating his goal to Wilkins. However, just three minutes after entering the match as a substitute, Hernández struck his ninth career goal against the Blues to earn a point for the Hammers. The Mexican's effort, driven into the corner after Marko Arnautović's fine cut-back, moved David Moyes' club six points clear of the relegation places. It was only West Ham's third touch inside the Chelsea's penalty area. In contrast, Antonio Conte's men — who were in fifth position but ten points behind Tottenham and Liverpool — had 23 shots on goal and were good value for their lead for long periods, including having two would-be goals from Álvaro Morata called-back for offside and several quality chances turned aside by goalkeeper Joe Hart. The win for Moyes as a manager ended a personal 15-match winless run at Stamford Bridge.

On 14 April, Chelsea returning to the winning track with a thrilling 3–2 late comeback victory against Southampton at St. Mary's Stadium. Dušan Tadić's opener — a placed effort following Ryan Bertrand's marauding run — and Polish defender Jan Bednarek's left-footed shot looked to lift the Saints out of the bottom three with manager Mark Hughes seemingly on course for a first league victory as Southampton manager since arriving on 14 March. However, after coming on a substitute, Olivier Giroud scored his first Premier League goal for Chelsea, a 70th-minute header. Just five minutes later, Eden Hazard scored a left-footed finish, followed by a second goal from Giroud coming in the 78th minute, the eventual match-winner. The victory saw Chelsea move within seven points of fourth-placed Tottenham.

On 19 April, Chelsea defeated Burnley 2–1 away at Turf Moor. Kevin Long's own goal sent Conte's men on their way in the first half. However, Ashley Barnes deflected Jóhann Berg Guðmundsson's wayward shot to equalise for Burnley. Victor Moses' right-footed shot into the bottom corner proved decisive and ensured the Blues, who trailed fourth-placed Tottenham by ten points the previous week, narrowed the gap to five points. Sean Dyche's Burnley remain seventh and on course for 2018–19 UEFA Europa League qualification with an eight-point advantage over Leicester City, sitting in eighth.

On 21 April, Chelsea reached the FA Cup Final after defeating Southampton 2–0 at Wembley Stadium. Chelsea striker Olivier Giroud received the ball from Eden Hazard and jinked his way past two Southampton players in a crowded area before he stabbed the ball home. With ten minutes to play, Giroud was replaced by Álvaro Morata, who ensured progression with Chelsea's second goal after he headed-in at the back post from a César Azpilicueta cross. Southampton went close with Nathan Redmond's low drive from distance, while Charlie Austin hit the post. The victory meant Chelsea manager Antonio Conte would match-up against managerial adversary José Mourinho at Wembley on 19 May against Manchester United.

On 28 April, Chelsea take against Swansea at Liberty Stadium, Chelsea returned to playing in the league after playing in the FA Cup last week. Fabregas' curling finish was a fitting way to bring up his half-century of goals in the Premier League, but it was Hazard's clinical exploitation of a Swansea error that made it, pouncing on Andy King's sloppy loss of possession, weaving his way forward and picking out the right pass. Antonio Rudiger may well have given Hazard his second assist soon after, only for the defender to spurn the chance at the far post following a corner. Hazard was at the heart of Chelsea's best threatening moves and made the most of some naive defending as Swansea afforded him plenty of space for surging runs on the counter. Chelsea – who had skimmed the top of the bar after Alfie Mawson cleared an Olivier Giroud header – did not see goalkeeper Thibaut Courtois really tested until the final 15 minutes, when Andre Ayew fizzed in a shot. Kyle Naughton, Tom Carroll and Wayne Routledge also went close. Swansea claimed for a penalty when Gary Cahill challenged Nathan Dyer, with the Chelsea defender also involved in a clash with Jordan Ayew in injury time after a late barge from the Ghanaian.

Position at the end of April
Pos	Team	Pld	W	D	L	GF	GA	GD	Pts	Qualification
3	Liverpool (T)	36	20	12	4	80	37	+43	72	Qualification for the Champions League group stage
4	Tottenham Hotspur (T)	35	21	8	6	68	31	+37	71	Qualification for the Champions League group stage
5	Chelsea (T)	35	20	6	9	60	34	+26	66	Qualification for the Europa League group stage
6	Arsenal	35	17	6	12	68	49	+19	57	Qualification for the Europa League second qualifying round
7	Burnley	36	14	12	10	35	32	+3	54	

(T) Qualified, but not yet for the particular phase indicated

=== May ===
On 6 May on Gameweek 37, Chelsea beat Liverpool at the Bridge 1–0 with a header from Giroud in the 32nd minute after receiving an assist from Moses. Giroud expertly headed in Moses' cross in the first half after the visitors had dominated possession and failed to capitalize. Chelsea remain in fifth but move within three points of third-placed Liverpool. With two games remaining to Liverpool's one, Chelsea can move level on points with the Champions League finalists when they face Huddersfield on Wednesday. Liverpool had more than 66% possession in the first half and created plenty of chances – the best falling to Mane, who was denied twice by Thibaut Courtois – but it was Chelsea who came closest. Bakayoko's header bounced inches wide just moments before Giroud leapt high to nod home Moses' cross. And Fabregas' smart run in behind the defence created an opening which he could not convert from a tight angle. Chelsea had the best chances of the second half too. Hazard almost danced his way through before Rudiger's header was ruled out for offside and Alonso's volley flew inches wide.

On 13 May, at the last Gameweek, Chelsea claimed a 3–0 defeat at St James' Park. The Blues had a chance of sneaking into the top four by beating the Magpies, but Liverpool's victory over Brighton means they finish fifth and must settle for a Europa League spot. A barrage at goal from the hosts forced visiting goalkeeper Thibaut Courtois to make sharp saves from the impressive Jonjo Shelvey and Mohamed Diamé. But Ayoze Pérez poked home twice in the second period as his side finished the season in 10th position. Chelsea's best chance fell to striker Olivier Giroud, but the Frenchman's acrobatic effort was tipped away by goalkeeper Martin Dubravka. Shelvey gets an MOTM in this match.

On 19 May, in the FA Cup Final, Chelsea lifted the FA Cup after beating Manchester United 1–0 at Wembley with a single-goal from Eden Hazard's penalty at 22 minutes after Phil Jones fouled Hazard. Chelsea won their 8th FA Cup Trophy and their first since 2012.

==== Final league position ====
Pos	Team	Pld	W	D	L	GF	GA	GD	Pts	Qualification or relegation
3	Tottenham Hotspur	38	23	8	7	74	36	+38	77	Qualification for the Champions League group stage
4	Liverpool	38	21	12	5	84	38	+46	75	Qualification for the Champions League group stage
5	Chelsea	38	21	7	10	62	38	+24	70	Qualification for the Europa League group stage (Note: Since the winners of the 2017–18 FA Cup (Chelsea) and the winners of the 2017–18 EFL Cup (Manchester City) both qualified for European competition based on their league positions, the berths awarded to the 5th-placed team (Europa League group stage) and the League Cup winners (Europa League second qualifying round) were passed down the league.)
6	Arsenal	38	19	6	13	74	51	+23	63	Qualification for the Europa League group stage
7	Burnley	38	14	12	12	36	39	−3	54	Qualification for the Europa League second qualifying round

Source: Premier League
Rules for classification: 1) Points; 2) Goal difference; 3) Goals scored. 4) Play-offs (only if needed to decide champion, teams for relegation or teams for UEFA competitions).

== Coaching staff ==
Position	Staff
First-team Manager	(Italy) Antonio Conte
Assistant Managers	(Italy) Angelo Alessio
Assistant Managers	(Italy) Gianluca Conte
Assistant Managers	(Italy) Carlo Cudicini
Assistant Managers	(Italy) Paolo Vanoli
Goalkeeper Coach	(Italy) Gianluca Spinelli
Assistant Goalkeeper Coach	(Portugal) Henrique Hilário
Head Fitness Coaches	(Italy) Paolo Bertelli
Head Fitness Coaches	(England) Chris Jones
Head Fitness Coaches	(Spain) Julio Tous
Assistant Fitness Coach	(Italy) Constantino Coratti
Consultant Personal Trainer/Nutritionist	(Italy) Tiberio Ancora
Video Analyst	(Italy) Davide Mazzotta
Senior Opposition Scout	(England) Mick McGiven
Medical Director	(Spain) Paco Biosca
Head of Youth Development	(England) Neil Bath
Loan Technical Coach	(England) Eddie Newton
Under-23 Team Manager	(England) Joe Edwards
Under-18 Team Manager	(England) Jody Morris
Head of International Scouting	(England) Scott McLachlan

Source: Chelsea F.C.

=== Other information ===
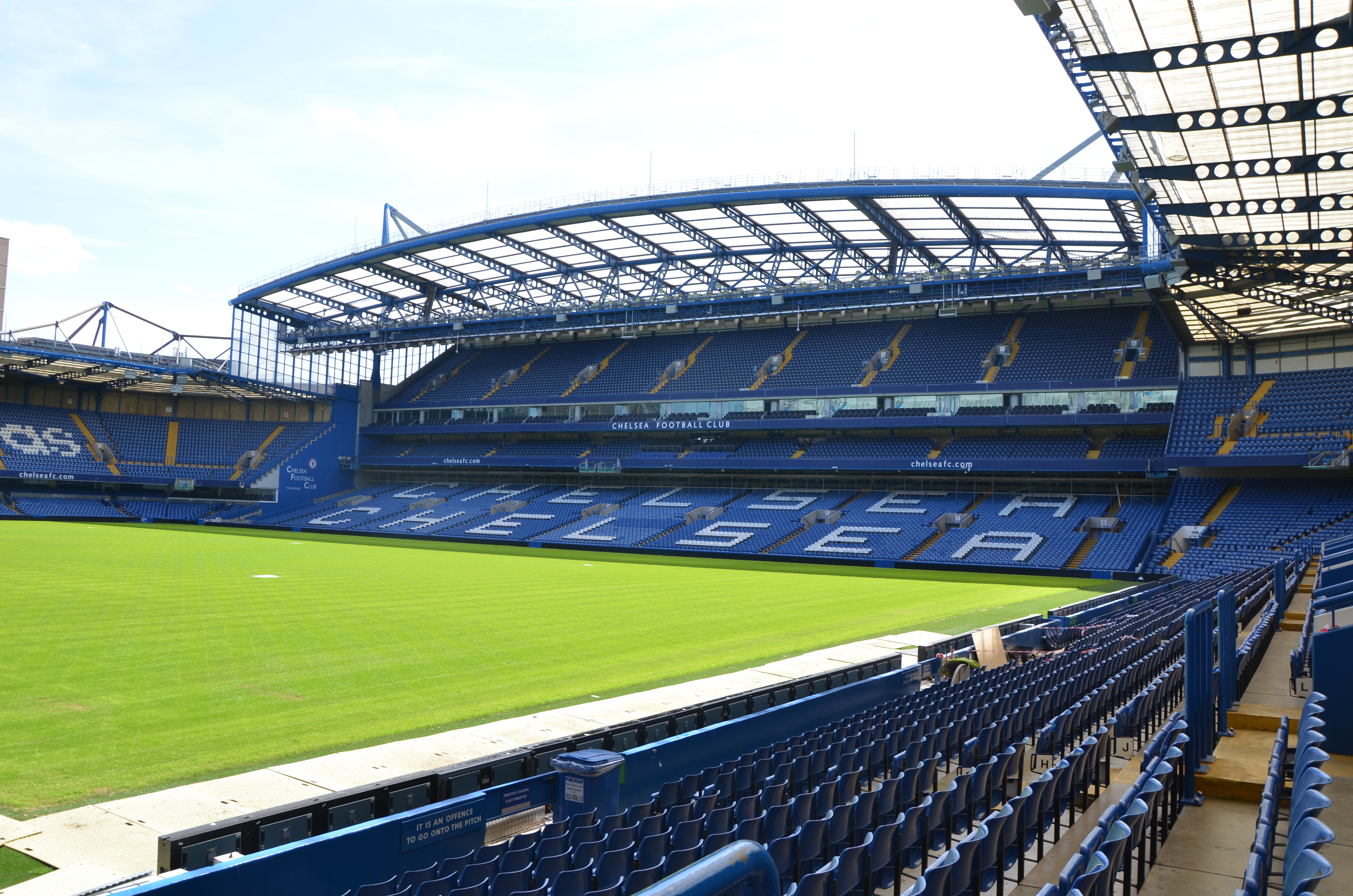
Stamford Bridge

Owner	(Russia) (Israel) Roman Abramovich
Chairman	(United States) Bruce Buck
Directors	(Russia) (Canada) Marina Granovskaia (Ukraine) (Canada) Eugene Tenenbaum
Chief Executive	(England) Guy Laurence
Club Secretary	(England) David Barnard
Ground (capacity and dimensions)	Stamford Bridge (41,663 / 103x67 metres)
Training Ground	Cobham Training Centre

Source: Chelsea F.C.

== Squad information ==
=== First team squad ===
As of 19 May 2018.

No.	Name	Nat	Position	Since	Date of birth (age)	Signed from	Games	Goals
Goalkeepers
1	Willy Caballero	(Argentina)	GK	2017	28 September 1981 (aged 36)	(England) Manchester City	13	0
13	Thibaut Courtois	(Belgium)	GK	2011	11 May 1992 (aged 26)	(Belgium) Genk	154	0
37	Eduardo	(Portugal)	GK	2016	19 September 1982 (aged 35)	(Croatia) Dinamo Zagreb	0	0
Defenders
2	Antonio Rüdiger	(Germany)	CB / RB	2017	3 March 1993 (aged 25)	(Italy) Roma	45	3
3	Marcos Alonso	(Spain)	LWB / LB	2016	28 December 1990 (aged 27)	(Italy) Fiorentina	81	14
15	Victor Moses HG^{1}	(Nigeria)	RWB / RW	2012	12 December 1990 (aged 27)	(England) Wigan Athletic	122	18
21	Davide Zappacosta	(Italy)	RB / RWB / LB	2017	11 June 1992 (aged 25)	(Italy) Torino	35	2
24	Gary Cahill HG^{1} (C)	(England)	CB	2012	19 December 1985 (aged 32)	(England) Bolton Wanderers	282	25
27	Andreas Christensen U21 HG^{2}	(Denmark)	CB / RB	2012	10 April 1996 (aged 22)	Academy	43	0
28	César Azpilicueta (VC)	(Spain)	CB / RB / LB	2012	28 August 1989 (aged 28)	(France) Marseille	280	8
30	David Luiz	(Brazil)	CB / CDM	2016	22 April 1987 (aged 31)	(France) Paris Saint-Germain	197	15
33	Emerson	(Italy)	LWB / LB	2018	3 August 1994 (aged 23)	(Italy) Roma	7	0
50	Trevoh Chalobah U21 HG^{2}	(England)	CB / RB / LB	2018	5 July 1999 (aged 18)	Academy	0	0
66	Dujon Sterling U21 HG^{2}	(England)	RWB / RW	2017	24 October 1999 (aged 18)	Academy	2	0
Midfielders
4	Cesc Fàbregas HG^{1}	(Spain)	CM	2014	4 May 1987 (aged 31)	(Spain) Barcelona	182	21
6	Danny Drinkwater HG^{1}	(England)	CM	2017	5 March 1990 (aged 28)	(England) Leicester City	22	1
7	N'Golo Kanté	(France)	CM / CDM / RM	2016	29 March 1991 (aged 27)	(England) Leicester City	89	3
8	Ross Barkley HG^{1}	(England)	AM / CM	2018	5 December 1993 (aged 24)	(England) Everton	4	0
10	Eden Hazard	(Belgium)	LW / RW	2012	7 January 1991 (aged 27)	(France) Lille	300	89
11	Pedro	(Spain)	RW / LW	2015	28 July 1987 (aged 30)	(Spain) Barcelona	131	28
14	Tiémoué Bakayoko	(France)	CM / CDM	2017	17 August 1994 (aged 23)	(France) Monaco	43	3
22	Willian	(Brazil)	RW / LW	2013	9 August 1988 (aged 29)	(Russia) Anzhi Makhachkala	236	44
36	Kyle Scott U21 HG^{2}	(United States)	CM	2017	22 December 1997 (aged 20)	Academy	1	0
44	Ethan Ampadu U21 HG^{1}	(Wales)	CM / CB / CDM	2017	14 September 2000 (aged 17)	(England) Exeter City	7	0
70	Callum Hudson-Odoi U21 HG^{2}	(England)	AM	2017	7 November 2000 (aged 17)	Academy	4	0
Forwards
9	Álvaro Morata	(Spain)	ST	2017	23 October 1992 (aged 25)	(Spain) Real Madrid	48	15
18	Olivier Giroud	(France)	ST	2018	30 September 1986 (aged 31)	(England) Arsenal	18	5

- HG^{1} = Association-trained player
- HG^{2} = Club-trained player
- U21 = Under-21 player

== New contracts ==
No.	Pos	Player	Contract length	Contract end	Date	Source
—	AM	(England) Kasey Palmer	4 years	2021	3 July 2017	
—	CF	(England) Tammy Abraham	5 years	2022	4 July 2017	
—	CM	(Ecuador) Josimar Quintero	2 years	2019	5 July 2017	
43	LM	(England) Isaac Christie-Davies	1 year	2018	6 July 2017	
52	LB	(Wales) Cole Dasilva	1 year	2018	6 July 2017	
47	CB	(Sweden) Ali Suljic	1 year	2018	6 July 2017	
35	CB	(England) Jake Clarke-Salter	4 years	2021	14 July 2017	
—	AM	(Brazil) Lucas Piazon	2 years	2019	14 July 2017	
—	CM	(Netherlands) Marco van Ginkel	3 years	2020	16 July 2017	
—	CF	(England) Ike Ugbo	4 years	2021	17 July 2017	
—	LB	(England) Jay Dasilva	4 years	2021	21 July 2017	
5	CB	(France) Kurt Zouma	6 years	2023	21 July 2017	
—	CM	(England) Mason Mount	4 years	2021	24 July 2017	
—	CF	(England) Izzy Brown	4 years	2021	25 July 2017	
32	CB	(Czech Republic) Tomáš Kalas	4 years	2021	27 July 2017	
—	GK	(England) Jamal Blackman	4 years	2021	27 July 2017	
39	CM	(Croatia) Mario Pašalić	4 years	2021	2 August 2017	
54	CM	(England) Jacob Maddox	4 years	2021	6 August 2017	
34	CM	(England) Lewis Baker	5 years	2022	11 August 2017	
49	RB	(England) Charlie Wakefield	2 years	2019	15 August 2017	
—	CB	(Nigeria) Kenneth Omeruo	3 years	2020	25 August 2017	
38	LW	(Ivory Coast) Jérémie Boga	3 years	2020	28 August 2017	
65	CM	(England) George McEachran	2 years	2019	31 August 2017	
63	CB	(England) Marc Guehi	3 years	2020	14 September 2017	
44	CB	(Wales) Ethan Ampadu	3 years	2020	18 September 2017	
—	RB	(England) Tariq Lamptey	3 years	2020	30 September 2017	
—	CM	(England) Jon Russell	3 years	2020	9 October 2017	
—	GK	(England) Jared Thompson	2 years	2019	19 October 2017	
—	CB	(England) Jack Wakely	3 years	2020	25 October 2017	
70	CF	(England) Callum Hudson-Odoi	2 years	2019	17 November 2017	
66	RB	(England) Dujon Sterling	5 years	2022	20 November 2017	
17	LW	(Belgium) Charly Musonda	5 years	2022	8 December 2017	
—	GK	(England) Nathan Baxter	3 years	2020	5 January 2018	
27	CB	(Denmark) Andreas Christensen	5 years	2022	9 January 2018	
50	CB	(England) Trevoh Chalobah	4 years	2021	9 March 2018	
53	CB	(England) Josh Grant	1 year	2019	10 May 2018	
56	CB	(England) Richard Nartey	1 year	2019	10 May 2018	

== Transfers ==
=== In ===
==== Summer ====
First Team

No.	Pos	Player	Transferred From	Fee	Date	Source
1	GK	(Argentina) Willy Caballero	(England) Manchester City	Free	1 July 2017	
2	CB	(Germany) Antonio Rüdiger	(Italy) Roma	£29,000,000 (Note: £4,300,000 in bonuses)	9 July 2017	
14	CM	(France) Tiémoué Bakayoko	(France) Monaco	£40,000,000	15 July 2017	
9	ST	(Spain) Álvaro Morata	(Spain) Real Madrid	£58,000,000 (Note: £12,000,000 in possible add-ons)	21 July 2017	
21	RB	(Italy) Davide Zappacosta	(Italy) Torino	£23,000,000	31 August 2017	
6	CM	(England) Danny Drinkwater	(England) Leicester City	£35,000,000	31 August 2017	

Development and Academy

No.	Pos	Player	Transferred From	Fee	Date	Source
—	GK	(Croatia) Karlo Žiger	(Croatia) NK Zagreb	Undisclosed	1 July 2017	
72	GK	(Ivory Coast) Nicolas Tié	(France) Poitiers	Undisclosed	1 July 2017	
71	AM	(Scotland) Billy Gilmour	(Scotland) Rangers	£500,000	1 July 2017	
73	CF	(Netherlands) Daishawn Redan	(Netherlands) Ajax	Free	1 July 2017	
44	CB	(Wales) Ethan Ampadu	(England) Exeter City	Undisclosed	1 July 2017	
—	LW	(England) Adebambo Akinjogbin	(England) Abbey Rangers	Free	17 August 2017	
—	LB	(England) Renedi Masampu	(England) Metropolitan Police	Free	17 August 2017	
—	LW	(England) Tushaun Walters	(England) Abbey Rangers	Free	17 August 2017	
48	LW	(Belgium) Kylian Hazard	(Hungary) Újpest	Undisclosed	29 August 2017	

==== Winter ====
First Team

No.	Pos	Player	Transferred From	Fee	Date	Source
8	AM	(England) Ross Barkley	(England) Everton	£15,000,000	5 January 2018	
33	LB	(Italy) Emerson	(Italy) Roma	£17,500,000	30 January 2018	
18	ST	(France) Olivier Giroud	(England) Arsenal	£18,000,000	31 January 2018	

=== Out ===
==== Summer ====
No.	Pos	Player	Transferred To	Fee	Date	Source
1	GK	(Bosnia and Herzegovina) Asmir Begović	(England) Bournemouth	£10,000,000	1 July 2017	
41	CF	(England) Dominic Solanke	(England) Liverpool	Tribunal	1 July 2017	
—	RW	(Colombia) Juan Cuadrado	(Italy) Juventus	£17,300,000 (Note: £4,000,000 in variables)	1 July 2017	
—	RW	(Ghana) Christian Atsu	(England) Newcastle United	£6,200,000	1 July 2017	
—	RW	(England) Alex Kiwomya	(England) Doncaster Rovers	Free	1 July 2017	
—	RW	(Burkina Faso) Bertrand Traoré	(France) Lyon	£8,800,000	1 July 2017	
6	LB	(Netherlands) Nathan Aké	(England) Bournemouth	£20,000,000	1 July 2017	
—	LB	(Chile) Cristián Cuevas	(Chile) Huachipato	Undisclosed	1 July 2017	
26	CB	(England) John Terry	(England) Aston Villa	Free	3 July 2017	
29	CM	(England) Nathaniel Chalobah	(England) Watford	£5,000,000 (Note: £2,000,000 in bonuses)	13 July 2017	
—	DM	(Saudi Arabia) Mukhtar Ali	(Netherlands) Vitesse	£500,000	17 July 2017	
21	CM	(Serbia) Nemanja Matić	(England) Manchester United	£40,000,000 (Note: £5,000,000 in possible add-ons)	31 July 2017	
—	CM	(Belgium) Tika Musonda	(Spain) Llagostera	Free	22 August 2017	
—	CB	(England) Kyle Jameson	(England) West Bromwich Albion	Undisclosed	31 August 2017	
—	CF	(England) Malakai Hinckson-Mars	(England) Barnet	Undisclosed	31 August 2017	
18	CF	(France) Loïc Rémy	(Spain) Las Palmas	Free	1 September 2017	
—	CB	(Scotland) Alex Davey	(England) Cheltenham Town	Free	21 September 2017	

==== Winter ====
No.	Pos	Player	Transferred To	Fee	Date	Source
19	CF	(Spain) Diego Costa	(Spain) Atlético Madrid	£50,000,000 (Note: £8,000,000 in add-ons)	1 January 2018	
—	CF	(England) Adebambo Akinjogbin	Unattached (Note: Akinjogbin joined Wingate & Finchley on 18 April 2018.)	Free	1 January 2018	
47	CB	(Sweden) Ali Suljic	Unattached (Note: Suljic joined BK Häcken on 2 July 2018.)	Free	31 January 2018	
45	LM	(Switzerland) Miro Muheim	(Switzerland) St. Gallen	Free	31 January 2018	

=== Loan out ===
==== Summer ====
No.	Pos	Player	Loaned To	Start	End	Source
—	CM	(Serbia) Danilo Pantić	(Serbia) Partizan	1 July 2017	30 June 2018	
—	GK	(England) Nathan Baxter	(England) Woking	1 July 2017	30 June 2018	
—	RB	(England) Fankaty Dabo	(Netherlands) Vitesse	1 July 2017	30 June 2018	
—	CF	(England) Tammy Abraham	(Wales) Swansea City	4 July 2017	30 June 2018	
—	AM	(England) Kasey Palmer	(England) Huddersfield Town	4 July 2017	3 January 2018 (Note: On 3 January 2018, Palmer's loan spell was terminated.)	
—	RB	(England) Todd Kane	(Netherlands) Groningen	5 July 2017	30 January 2018 (Note: On 30 January 2018, Kane's loan spell was terminated.)	
—	CM	(Ecuador) Josimar Quintero	(Russia) Rostov	5 July 2017	1 January 2018 (Note: On 1 January 2018, Quintero's loan spell was terminated.)	
—	CM	(England) Charlie Colkett	(Netherlands) Vitesse	6 July 2017	31 January 2018 (Note: On 31 January 2018, Colkett's loan spell was terminated.)	
—	GK	(England) Bradley Collins	(England) Forest Green Rovers	7 July 2017	30 June 2018	
34	RB	(Nigeria) Ola Aina	(England) Hull City	11 July 2017	30 June 2018	
14	CM	(England) Ruben Loftus-Cheek	(England) Crystal Palace	12 July 2017	30 June 2018	
—	AM	(Brazil) Lucas Piazon	(England) Fulham	14 July 2017	30 June 2018	
—	CM	(Netherlands) Marco van Ginkel	(Netherlands) PSV Eindhoven	16 July 2017	30 June 2018	
—	CF	(England) Ike Ugbo	(England) Barnsley	17 July 2017	3 January 2018 (Note: On 3 January 2018, Ugbo's loan spell was terminated.)	
—	LB	(England) Jay Dasilva	(England) Charlton Athletic	21 July 2017	30 June 2018	
5	CB	(France) Kurt Zouma	(England) Stoke City	21 July 2017	30 June 2018	
—	CM	(England) Mason Mount	(Netherlands) Vitesse	24 July 2017	30 June 2018	
—	CF	(England) Izzy Brown	(England) Brighton & Hove Albion	25 July 2017	10 January 2018 (Note: On 10 January 2018, Brown's loan spell was terminated.)	
32	CB	(Czech Republic) Tomáš Kalas	(England) Fulham	27 July 2017	30 June 2018	
—	CB	(Jamaica) Michael Hector	(England) Hull City	27 July 2017	30 June 2018	
—	GK	(England) Jamal Blackman	(England) Sheffield United	27 July 2017	30 June 2018	
—	CB	(United States) Matt Miazga	(Netherlands) Vitesse	28 July 2017	30 June 2018	
—	GK	(England) Jared Thompson	(England) Chippenham Town	28 July 2017	30 June 2018	
—	DM	(Ivory Coast) Victorien Angban	(Belgium) Waasland-Beveren	28 July 2017	30 June 2018	
39	CM	(Croatia) Mario Pašalić	(Russia) Spartak Moscow	2 August 2017	30 June 2018	
34	CM	(England) Lewis Baker	(England) Middlesbrough	11 August 2017	30 June 2018	
—	CB	(Nigeria) Kenneth Omeruo	(Turkey) Kasımpaşa	25 August 2017	30 June 2018	
38	LW	(Ivory Coast) Jérémie Boga	(England) Birmingham City	28 August 2017	30 June 2018	
42	CM	(England) Jordan Houghton	(England) Doncaster Rovers	31 August 2017	30 June 2018 (Note: On 5 January 2018, Houghton's loan spell was extended until 30 June 2018.)	
49	RB	(England) Charlie Wakefield	(England) Stevenage	31 August 2017	30 June 2018	
—	LW	(Brazil) Nathan	(France) Amiens	31 August 2017	1 January 2018 (Note: On 1 January 2018, Nathan's loan spell was terminated.)	
31	CB	(England) Fikayo Tomori	(England) Hull City	31 August 2017	30 June 2018	
—	CF	(Colombia) Joao Rodríguez	(Mexico) Tampico Madero	5 September 2017	30 June 2018	

==== Winter ====
No.	Pos	Player	Loaned To	Start	End	Source
—	CF	(England) Ike Ugbo	(England) Milton Keynes Dons	4 January 2018	30 June 2018	
35	CB	(England) Jake Clarke-Salter	(England) Sunderland	8 January 2018	30 June 2018	
—	CM	(Ecuador) Josimar Quintero	(Spain) Real Betis B	17 January 2018	30 June 2018	
—	LW	(Brazil) Nathan	(Portugal) Belenenses	18 January 2018	30 June 2018	
16	LW	(Brazil) Kenedy	(England) Newcastle United	23 January 2018	30 June 2018	
—	LB	(Ghana) Baba Rahman	(Germany) Schalke 04	29 January 2018	30 June 2019	
17	MF	(Belgium) Charly Musonda	(Scotland) Celtic	29 January 2018	17 May 2018 (Note: On 17 May 2018, Kane's loan spell was terminated.)	
—	RB	(England) Todd Kane	(England) Oxford United	31 January 2018	30 June 2018	
23	CF	(Belgium) Michy Batshuayi	(Germany) Borussia Dortmund	31 January 2018	30 June 2018	
—	AM	(England) Kasey Palmer	(England) Derby County	31 January 2018	30 June 2018	
41	GK	(England) Mitchell Beeney	(Republic of Ireland) Sligo Rovers	22 February 2018	30 June 2018	

=== Overall transfer activity ===
==== Expenditure ====
Summer: ▼£201.8 Million

Winter: ▼£50.5 Million

Total: ▼£252.3 Million

==== Income ====
Summer: ▲£118.8 Million

Winter: ▲£58 Million

Total: ▲£176.8 Million

==== Net Totals ====
Summer: ▼£83 Million

Winter: ▲£7.5 Million

Total: ▼£75.5 Million

== Pre-season ==
On 16 March 2017, it was announced that Chelsea would play Arsenal at the Beijing National Stadium in China, prior to the 2017 International Champions Cup. Before heading to China, Chelsea played a behind-closed-doors friendly against local rivals Fulham, which they won by a convincing scoreline of 8–2.

15 July 2017 Friendly	Chelsea	8–2	Fulham	Cobham
17:00 BST	Willian 14', 17', 43'; Batshuayi 31', 34'; Rémy 57', 86' (pen.); Azpilicueta 75' (pen.)	Report	Azpilicueta 20' (o.g.); Johansen 55' (pen.)	Stadium: Cobham Training Centre

22 July 2017 Friendly	Arsenal	0–3	Chelsea	Beijing, China
19:40 CST		Report	Willian 40'; Batshuayi 42', 49'	Stadium: Beijing National Stadium; Referee: Fu Ming (China)

=== International Champions Cup ===
On 16 March 2017, the schedule for the 2017 International Champions Cup was announced. Chelsea played Bayern Munich and Internazionale in the club's first ever trip to Singapore.

25 July 2017 ICC	Chelsea	2–3	Bayern Munich	Kallang, Singapore
19:35 SST	Alonso 45+3'; Batshuayi 85'	Report	Rafinha 6'; Müller 12', 27'	Stadium: Singapore National Stadium; Attendance: 48,522; Referee: Muhammad Taqi Aljaafari Bin Jahari (Singapore)

29 July 2017 ICC	Chelsea	1–2	Internazionale	Kallang, Singapore
19:35 SST	Kondogbia 74' (o.g.)	Report	Jovetić 45+3'; Perišić 53'	Stadium: Singapore National Stadium; Attendance: 32,547; Referee: Subkhir Singh (Singapore)

== Competitions ==
=== FA Community Shield ===
Details for the 2017 FA Community Shield were announced on 15 June 2017.

6 August 2017 Final	Arsenal	1–1 (4–1 p)	Chelsea	Wembley
14:00 BST	Bellerín (yellow card) 15'; Kolašinac 82'	Report	Azpilicueta (yellow card) 13'; Alonso (yellow card) 35'; Willian (yellow card) 37'; Moses 46'; Pedro (red card) 81'	Stadium: Wembley Stadium; Attendance: 83,325; Referee: Bobby Madley
	Penalties
	Walcott (penalty scored); Monreal (penalty scored); Oxlade-Chamberlain (penalty scored); Giroud (penalty scored)		(penalty scored) Cahill; (penalty missed) Courtois; (penalty missed) Morata

=== Premier League ===
==== League table ====
Pos	Team	Pld	W	D	L	GF	GA	GD	Pts	Qualification or relegation
3	Tottenham Hotspur	38	23	8	7	74	36	+38	77	Qualification for the Champions League group stage
4	Liverpool	38	21	12	5	84	38	+46	75	Qualification for the Champions League group stage
5	Chelsea	38	21	7	10	62	38	+24	70	Qualification for the Europa League group stage (Note: Since the winners of the 2017–18 FA Cup (Chelsea) and the winners of the 2017–18 EFL Cup (Manchester City) both qualified for European competition based on their league positions, the berths awarded to the 5th-placed team (Europa League group stage) and the League Cup winners (Europa League second qualifying round) were passed down the league.)
6	Arsenal	38	19	6	13	74	51	+23	63	Qualification for the Europa League group stage
7	Burnley	38	14	12	12	36	39	−3	54	Qualification for the Europa League second qualifying round

Source: Premier League
Rules for classification: 1) Points; 2) Goal difference; 3) Goals scored. 4) Play-offs (only if needed to decide champion, teams for relegation or teams for UEFA competitions).

==== Result summary ====
Overall								Home						Away					
Pld	W	D	L	GF	GA	GD	Pts	W	D	L	GF	GA	GD	W	D	L	GF	GA	GD
38	21	7	10	62	38	+24	70	11	4	4	30	16	+14	10	3	6	32	22	+10

Source: Premier League

==== Results by matchday ====
Matchday	1	2	3	4	5	6	7	8	9	10	11	12	13	14	15	16	17	18	19	20	21	22	23	24	25	26	27	28	29	30	31	32	33	34	35	36	37	38
Ground	H	A	H	A	H	A	H	A	H	A	H	A	A	H	H	A	A	H	A	H	H	A	H	A	H	A	H	A	A	H	H	H	A	A	A	H	H	A
Result	L	W	W	W	D	W	L	L	W	W	W	W	D	W	W	L	W	W	D	W	W	D	D	W	L	L	W	L	L	W	L	D	W	W	W	W	D	L
Position	14	11	6	3	3	3	4	5	4	4	4	3	3	3	3	3	3	3	3	3	2	3	4	3	4	4	4	5	5	5	5	5	5	5	5	5	5	5

Source: 11v11
A = Away; H = Home; W = Win; D = Draw; L = Loss

==== Matches ====
Win Draw Loss

The fixtures for the 2017–18 season were announced on 14 June 2017.

12 August 2017 1	Chelsea	2–3	Burnley	Fulham
15:00 BST	Alonso (yellow card) 3'; Cahill (red card) 14'; Fàbregas (yellow card) 16' (yellow-red card) 81'; Morata 69'; David Luiz (yellow card) 77', (goal) 88'; Rüdiger (yellow card) 89'	Report	Vokes 24', 43'; Ward 39'; Brady (yellow card) 60'; Mee (yellow card) 63'; Arfield (yellow card) 77'	Stadium: Stamford Bridge; Attendance: 41,616; Referee: Craig Pawson

20 August 2017 2	Tottenham Hotspur	1–2	Chelsea	Wembley
16:00 BST	Dier (yellow card) 31'; Vertonghen (yellow card) 51'; Batshuayi 82' (o.g.); Alderweireld (yellow card) 84'; Kane (yellow card) 88'	Report	Alonso 24', 88', (yellow card) 87'; Rüdiger (yellow card) 30'; David Luiz (yellow card) 38'	Stadium: Wembley Stadium; Attendance: 73,587; Referee: Anthony Taylor

27 August 2017 3	Chelsea	2–0	Everton	Fulham
13:30 BST	Fàbregas 27'; Morata 40'; Moses (yellow card) 76'; Azpilicueta (yellow card) 88'	Report	Gueye (yellow card) 9'; Rooney (yellow card) 71'	Stadium: Stamford Bridge; Attendance: 41,382; Referee: Jon Moss

9 September 2017 4	Leicester City	1–2	Chelsea	Leicester
15:00 BST	Vardy 62' (pen.); Ndidi (yellow card) 84'	Report	Morata 41'; Kanté 50'	Stadium: King Power Stadium; Attendance: 30,923; Referee: Lee Mason

17 September 2017 5	Chelsea	0–0	Arsenal	Fulham
13:30 BST	Morata (yellow card) 65'; David Luiz (red card) 87'	Report	Elneny (yellow card) 84'; Kolašinac (yellow card) 90+1'; Bellerín (yellow card) 90+3'	Stadium: Stamford Bridge; Attendance: 41,478; Referee: Michael Oliver

23 September 2017 6	Stoke City	0–4	Chelsea	Stoke-on-Trent
15:00 BST	Shaqiri (yellow card) 49'; Crouch (yellow card) 89'	Report	Morata 2', 77', 82'; Pedro 30'; Alonso (yellow card) 51'; Kanté (yellow card) 57'	Stadium: bet365 Stadium; Attendance: 29,661; Referee: Mike Dean

30 September 2017 7	Chelsea	0–1	Manchester City	Fulham
17:30 BST		Report	Fernandinho (yellow card) 61'; De Bruyne 67'; Otamendi (yellow card) 89'	Stadium: Stamford Bridge; Attendance: 41,530; Referee: Martin Atkinson

14 October 2017 8	Crystal Palace	2–1	Chelsea	Selhurst
15:00 BST	Azpilicueta 11' (o.g.); Zaha 45'; Milivojević (yellow card) 71'; Dann (yellow card) 83'	Report	Bakayoko 18', (yellow card) 87'	Stadium: Selhurst Park; Attendance: 25,480; Referee: Andre Marriner

21 October 2017 9	Chelsea	4–2	Watford	Fulham
12:30 BST	Pedro 12'; Rüdiger (yellow card) 23'; Morata (yellow card) 56'; Batshuayi 71', 90+5'; Azpilicueta 87'	Report	Holebas (yellow card) 12'; Mariappa (yellow card) 19'; Doucouré 45+2'; Pereyra 49'; Femenía (yellow card) 78'	Stadium: Stamford Bridge; Attendance: 41,467; Referee: Jon Moss

28 October 2017 10	Bournemouth	0–1	Chelsea	Bournemouth
17:30 BST	A. Smith (yellow card) 59'; Frances (yellow card) 88'	Report	Hazard 51'	Stadium: Dean Court; Attendance: 10,988; Referee: Craig Pawson

5 November 2017 11	Chelsea	1–0	Manchester United	Fulham
16:30 GMT	Bakayoko (yellow card) 20'; Morata 55'	Report	Jones (yellow card) 49'; Herrera (yellow card) 51'; Fellaini (yellow card) 71'	Stadium: Stamford Bridge; Attendance: 41,615; Referee: Anthony Taylor

18 November 2017 12	West Bromwich Albion	0–4	Chelsea	West Bromwich
15:00 GMT	Rondón (yellow card) 54'; Yacob (yellow card) 88'	Report	Morata 17', (yellow card) 90'; Hazard (yellow card) 19', (goal) 23', 62'; Alonso 38'; Fàbregas (yellow card) 50'	Stadium: The Hawthorns; Attendance: 23,592; Referee: Jon Moss

25 November 2017 13	Liverpool	1–1	Chelsea	Liverpool
17:30 GMT	Salah 65'	Report	Willian 85'	Stadium: Anfield; Attendance: 53,225; Referee: Michael Oliver

29 November 2017 14	Chelsea	1–0	Swansea City	Fulham
19:45 GMT	Rüdiger 55'; Morata (yellow card) 90+3'	Report		Stadium: Stamford Bridge; Attendance: 41365; Referee: Neil Swarbrick

2 December 2017 15	Chelsea	3–1	Newcastle United	Fulham
12:30 GMT	Hazard 21', 74' (pen.); Morata 33'	Report	Gayle 12'; Clark (yellow card) 45+1'	Stadium: Stamford Bridge; Attendance: 41,538; Referee: Kevin Friend

9 December 2017 16	West Ham United	1–0	Chelsea	Stratford
12:30 GMT	Arnautović 6', (yellow card) 7'; Adrián (yellow card) 58'; Reid (yellow card) 67'; Cresswell (yellow card) 68'; Obiang (yellow card) 70'; Masuaku (yellow card) 87'	Report	Alonso (yellow card) 18'	Stadium: London Stadium; Attendance: 56,953; Referee: Anthony Taylor

12 December 2017 17	Huddersfield Town	1–3	Chelsea	Huddersfield
20:00 GMT	Depoitre 90+2'	Report	Bakayoko 23'; Willian 43'; Pedro 50'	Stadium: John Smith's Stadium; Attendance: 24,169; Referee: Andre Marriner

16 December 2017 18	Chelsea	1–0	Southampton	Fulham
15:00 GMT	Alonso 45+3', (yellow card) 90+4'	Report	Yoshida (yellow card) 45+2'; Redmond (yellow card) 87'; Stephens (yellow card) 87'	Stadium: Stamford Bridge; Attendance: 41,562; Referee: Roger East

23 December 2017 19	Everton	0–0	Chelsea	Liverpool
12:30 GMT	Calvert-Lewin (yellow card) 10'; Martina (yellow card) 21'; Keane (yellow card) 57'	Report		Stadium: Goodison Park; Attendance: 39,191; Referee: Bobby Madley

26 December 2017 20	Chelsea	2–0	Brighton & Hove Albion	Fulham
15:00 GMT	Morata 46'; Alonso 60'	Report	Stephens (yellow card) 57'	Stadium: Stamford Bridge; Attendance: 41,568; Referee: Mike Dean

30 December 2017 21	Chelsea	5–0	Stoke City	Fulham
15:00 BST	Rüdiger 3'; Drinkwater 9'; Pedro 23', (yellow card) 52'; Willian 73' (pen.); Zappacosta 88'	Report	Diouf (yellow card) 27'	Stadium: Stamford Bridge; Attendance: 41,433; Referee: Kevin Friend

3 January 2018 22	Arsenal	2–2	Chelsea	Holloway
19:45 BST	Wilshere (yellow card) 31', (goal) 63'; Holding (yellow card) 53'; Özil (yellow card) 67'; Bellerín 90+2'	Report	Fàbregas (yellow card) 43'; Hazard 67' (pen.); Alonso 84'; Courtois (yellow card) 89'	Stadium: Emirates; Attendance: 59,379; Referee: Anthony Taylor

13 January 2018 23	Chelsea	0–0	Leicester City	Fulham
15:00 GMT	Kanté (yellow card) 56'; Morata (yellow card) 87'	Report	James (yellow card) 18'; Okazaki (yellow card) 61'; Chilwell (yellow card) 63' (yellow-red card) 68'	Stadium: Stamford Bridge; Attendance: 41,552; Referee: Mike Jones

20 January 2018 24	Brighton & Hove Albion	0–4	Chelsea	Falmer
12:30 GMT	Schelotto (yellow card) 36'; Duffy (yellow card) 56'; Goldson (yellow card) 79'	Report	Hazard 3', 77'; Willian 6'; Moses 89'	Stadium: Falmer Stadium; Attendance: 30,600; Referee: Jon Moss

31 January 2018 25	Chelsea	0–3	Bournemouth	Fulham
19:45 GMT	Fàbregas (yellow card) 77'	Report	Wilson 51'; Stanislas 64'; Aké 67'	Stadium: Stamford Bridge; Attendance: 41,464; Referee: Lee Probert

5 February 2018 26	Watford	4–1	Chelsea	Watford
20:00 GMT	Deeney 42' (pen.); Richarlison (yellow card) 45'; Prödl (yellow card) 50'; Janmaat 84'; Deulofeu 88'; Pereyra 90+1'	Report	Bakayoko (yellow card) 25' (yellow-red card) 30'; David Luiz (yellow card) 58'; Fàbregas (yellow card) 62'; Hazard 82'	Stadium: Vicarage Road; Attendance: 20,157; Referee: Mike Dean

12 February 2018 27	Chelsea	3–0	West Bromwich Albion	Fulham
20:00 GMT	Hazard 25', 71'; Moses 63'	Report	Evans (yellow card) 45+3'; Gibbs (yellow card) 49'	Stadium: Stamford Bridge; Attendance: 41,071; Referee: Lee Mason

25 February 2018 28	Manchester United	2–1	Chelsea	Manchester
14:05 GMT	Lukaku 39'; Valencia (yellow card) 68'; Lingard 75'; Matić (yellow card) 85'	Report	Kanté (yellow card) 30'; Willian 32'; Morata (yellow card) 88'	Stadium: Old Trafford; Attendance: 75,060; Referee: Martin Atkinson

4 March 2018 29	Manchester City	1–0	Chelsea	Manchester
16:00 GMT	Zinchenko (yellow card) 24'; B. Silva 46'; Gündoğan (yellow card) 47'	Report	Rüdiger (yellow card) 57'	Stadium: Etihad Stadium; Attendance: 54,328; Referee: Michael Oliver

10 March 2018 30	Chelsea	2–1	Crystal Palace	Fulham
17:30 GMT	Willian 25'; Kelly 32' (o.g.); Morata (yellow card) 86'	Report	Van Aanholt (yellow card) 59', (goal) 90'; Tomkins (yellow card) 86'	Stadium: Stamford Bridge; Attendance: 40,800; Referee: Anthony Taylor

1 April 2018 31	Chelsea	1–3	Tottenham Hotspur	Fulham
16:00 GMT	Morata 30'	Report	Eriksen 45+1'; Alli 62', 66'; Davies (yellow card) 70'	Stadium: Stamford Bridge; Attendance: 41,364; Referee: Andre Marriner

8 April 2018 32	Chelsea	1–1	West Ham United	Fulham
16:30 BST	Azpilicueta 36'	Report	Noble (yellow card) 46'; Hernández 73'	Stadium: Stamford Bridge; Attendance: 41,324; Referee: Kevin Friend

14 April 2018 33	Southampton	2–3	Chelsea	Southampton
12:30 BST	Tadić 21'; Højbjerg (yellow card) 42'; Ward-Prowse (yellow card) 44'; Bednarek 60'; Bertrand (yellow card) 65'; Romeu (yellow card) 78'; Long (yellow card) 81'	Report	Hazard (yellow card) 64', (goal) 75'; Giroud 70', 78'; Willian (yellow card) 82'; Cahill (yellow card) 90+4'	Stadium: St Mary's Stadium; Attendance: 31,764; Referee: Mike Dean

19 April 2018 34	Burnley	1–2	Chelsea	Burnley
19:45 BST	Tarkowski (yellow card) 28'; Barnes 64'	Report	Long 20' (o.g.); Moses 69'	Stadium: Turf Moor; Attendance: 21,264; Referee: Bobby Madley

28 April 2018 35	Swansea City	0–1	Chelsea	Swansea
17:30 BST	A. Ayew (yellow card) 15'	Report	Fàbregas 4'; Moses (yellow card) 30'	Stadium: Liberty Stadium; Attendance: 20,900; Referee: Jon Moss

6 May 2018 36	Chelsea	1–0	Liverpool	Fulham
16:30 BST	Giroud 32'; Alonso (yellow card) 79'; Moses (yellow card) 81'; Courtois (yellow card) 90+4'	Report	Salah (yellow card) 39'; Clyne (yellow card) 40'	Stadium: Stamford Bridge; Attendance: 41,314; Referee: Anthony Taylor

9 May 2018 37	Chelsea	1–1	Huddersfield Town	Fulham
19:45 BST	Alonso 62'	Report	Depoitre 50'; Lössl (yellow card) 88'	Stadium: Stamford Bridge; Attendance: 38,910; Referee: Lee Mason

13 May 2018 38	Newcastle United	3–0	Chelsea	Newcastle upon Tyne
15:00 BST	Gayle 23'; Pérez 59', 63'	Report	Bakayoko (yellow card) 62'	Stadium: St James' Park; Attendance: 52,294; Referee: Martin Atkinson

=== FA Cup ===
Win Draw Loss

In the FA Cup, Chelsea entered in the third round and were drawn away to Norwich City.

6 January 2018 Third round	Norwich City	0–0	Chelsea	Norwich
17:30 GMT	Hanley (yellow card) 76'; Tettey (yellow card) 86'	Report	David Luiz (yellow card) 41'; Cahill (yellow card) 62'	Stadium: Carrow Road; Attendance: 23,598; Referee: Stuart Attwell

17 January 2018 Third round replay	Chelsea	1–1 (a.e.t.) (5–3 p)	Norwich City	Fulham
20:00 GMT	Batshuayi 55'; Pedro (yellow card) 62' (yellow-red card) 117'; Willian (yellow card) 92'; Morata (yellow card) 120+1' (yellow-red card) 120+1'	Report	Lewis 90+4'; Maddison (yellow card) 97'	Stadium: Stamford Bridge; Attendance: 39,684; Referee: Graham Scott
	Penalties
	Willian (penalty scored); David Luiz (penalty scored); Azpilicueta (penalty scored); Kanté (penalty scored); Hazard (penalty scored)		Oliveira (penalty missed); Maddison (penalty scored); Vrančić (penalty scored); Murphy (penalty scored)

28 January 2018 Fourth round	Chelsea	3–0	Newcastle United	Fulham
13:30 GMT	Batshuayi 31', 44'; Alonso 72'	Report	Mbemba (yellow card) 17'	Stadium: Stamford Bridge; Attendance: 41,049; Referee: Kevin Friend

16 February 2018 Fifth round	Chelsea	4–0	Hull City	Fulham
20:00 GMT	Willian 2', 32'; Pedro 27'; Giroud 42'; Scott (yellow card) 82'	Report	Stewart (yellow card) 33'; Irvine (yellow card) 86'	Stadium: Stamford Bridge; Attendance: 39,591; Referee: Andre Marriner

18 March 2018 Quarter-finals	Leicester City	1–2 (a.e.t.)	Chelsea	Leicester
16:30 GMT	Maguire (yellow card) 25'; Vardy 76'	Report	Morata 42'; Bakayoko (yellow card) 45+1'; Moses (yellow card) 89'; Pedro 105'	Stadium: King Power Stadium; Attendance: 31,792; Referee: Craig Pawson

22 April 2018 Semi-finals	Chelsea	2–0	Southampton	Wembley
15:00 BST	Giroud 46'; Morata 82'	Report	Yoshida (yellow card) 40'; Romeu (yellow card) 50'; Lemina (yellow card) 55'; Hoedt (yellow card) 65'	Stadium: Wembley Stadium; Attendance: 73,416; Referee: Martin Atkinson

19 May 2018 Final	Chelsea	1–0	Manchester United	Wembley
17:15 BST	Hazard 22' (pen.); Courtois (yellow card) 90+3'	Report	Jones (yellow card) 21'; Valencia (yellow card) 58'	Stadium: Wembley Stadium; Attendance: 87,647; Referee: Michael Oliver

=== EFL Cup ===
Chelsea entered the competition in the third round and were drawn at home to Nottingham Forest. Another home tie against Everton was confirmed for the fourth round. A third home tie was drawn for the Blues as they hosted Bournemouth in the quarter-finals.

Win Draw Loss

20 September 2017 Third round	Chelsea	5–1	Nottingham Forest	Fulham
19:45 BST	Kenedy 13'; Batshuayi 19', 53', 85'; Musonda 40'	Report	Hobbs (yellow card) 21'; Darikwa 90+1'	Stadium: Stamford Bridge; Attendance: 40,621; Referee: Chris Kavanagh

25 October 2017 Fourth round	Chelsea	2–1	Everton	Fulham
19:45 BST	Rüdiger 26', (yellow card) 66'; Willian 90+2'	Report	Williams (yellow card) 28'; Davies (yellow card) 50'; McCarthy (yellow card) 52'; Jagielka (yellow card) 61'; Calvert-Lewin 90+4'	Stadium: Stamford Bridge; Attendance: 40,655; Referee: Neil Swarbrick

20 December 2017 Quarter-finals	Chelsea	2–1	Bournemouth	Fulham
19:45 GMT	Ampadu (yellow card) 2'; Willian 13'; Fàbregas (yellow card) 39'; Zappacosta (yellow card) 62'; Morata 90+1', (yellow card) 90+2'	Report	Simpson (yellow card) 72'; Francis (yellow card) 76'; A. Smith (yellow card) 82'; Gosling 90', (yellow card) 90+1'	Stadium: Stamford Bridge; Attendance: 41,168; Referee: Lee Mason

10 January 2018 Semi-finals; First leg	Chelsea	0–0	Arsenal	Fulham
20:00 GMT	Kanté (yellow card) 79'	Report	Xhaka (yellow card) 51'; Elneny (yellow card) 86'	Stadium: Stamford Bridge; Attendance: 40,097; Referee: Martin Atkinson

24 January 2018 Semi-finals; Second leg	Arsenal	2–1 (2–1 agg.)	Chelsea	Holloway
19:45 GMT	Rüdiger 12' (o.g.); Wilshere (yellow card) 31'; Xhaka 60'; Monreal (yellow card) 66'	Report	Hazard 7', (yellow card) 17'; Moses (yellow card) 62'	Stadium: Emirates Stadium; Attendance: 58,964; Referee: Michael Oliver

=== UEFA Champions League ===
On 24 August 2017, the group stages were confirmed with Chelsea facing Atlético Madrid, Roma and Qarabağ in Group C. The club finished as runners-up in the group stages and were drawn against Barcelona in round of 16.

==== Group stage ====
Pos	Team	Pld	W	D	L	GF	GA	GD	Pts	Qualification	ROM	CHE	ATM	QRB
1	(Italy) Roma	6	3	2	1	9	6	+3	11 (Note: Head-to-head results: Chelsea 3–3 Roma, Roma 3–0 Chelsea.)	Advance to knockout phase	—	3–0	0–0	1–0
2	(England) Chelsea	6	3	2	1	16	8	+8	11	Advance to knockout phase	3–3	—	1–1	6–0
3	(Spain) Atlético Madrid	6	1	4	1	5	4	+1	7	Transfer to Europa League	2–0	1–2	—	1–1
4	(Azerbaijan) Qarabağ	6	0	2	4	2	14	−12	2		1–2	0–4	0–0	—

Source: UEFA
Rules for classification: Group stage tiebreakers
Notes:

Win Draw Loss

12 September 2017 1	Chelsea (England)	6–0	(Azerbaijan) Qarabağ	London, England
19:45 BST	Pedro 5'; Cahill (yellow card) 16'; Zappacosta 30'; Azpilicueta 55'; Bakayoko 71'; Batshuayi 76'; Medvedev 82' (o.g.)	Report		Stadium: Stamford Bridge; Attendance: 41,150; Referee: Anastasios Sidiropoulos (Greece)

27 September 2017 2	Atlético Madrid (Spain)	1–2	(England) Chelsea	Madrid, Spain
19:45 BST	Griezmann 40' (pen.), (yellow card) 54'; Partey (yellow card) 47'	Report	David Luiz (yellow card) 39'; Morata 59'; Batshuayi 90+4'	Stadium: Estadio Metropolitano; Attendance: 60,643; Referee: Cüneyt Çakır (Turkey)

18 October 2017 3	Chelsea (England)	3–3	(Italy) Roma	London, England
19:45 BST	David Luiz 11'; Hazard 37', 75'; Bakayoko (yellow card) 69'	Report	Kolarov 40'; Džeko 64', 70'	Stadium: Stamford Bridge; Attendance: 41,105; Referee: Damir Skomina (Slovenia)

31 October 2017 4	Roma (Italy)	3–0	(England) Chelsea	Rome, Italy
19:45 GMT	El Shaarawy 1', 36'; Perotti 63'	Report		Stadium: Stadio Olimpico; Attendance: 55,036; Referee: Jonas Eriksson (Sweden)

22 November 2017 5	Qarabağ (Azerbaijan)	0–4	(England) Chelsea	Baku, Azerbaijan
17:00 GMT	Sadygov (red card) 19'; Rzeźniczak (yellow card) 41'; Medvedev (yellow card) 71'	Report	Hazard 21' (pen.); Willian 36', 85'; Alonso (yellow card) 53'; Fàbregas 73' (pen.)	Stadium: Baku Olimpiya Stadionu; Attendance: 67,100; Referee: Jorge Sousa (Portugal)

5 December 2017 6	Chelsea (England)	1–1	(Spain) Atlético Madrid	London, England
19:45 GMT	Zappacosta (yellow card) 52'; Savić 75' (o.g.)	Report	Hernandez (yellow card) 16'; Saúl 56'	Stadium: Stamford Bridge; Attendance: 40,875; Referee: Danny Makkelie (Netherlands)

==== Knockout phase ====
===== Round of 16 =====
20 February 2018 First leg	Chelsea (England)	1–1	(Spain) Barcelona	London, England
19:45 GMT (UTC+00:00)	Willian 62'; Rüdiger (yellow card) 80'; Morata (yellow card) 86'	Report	Rakitić (yellow card) 29'; Messi 75'; L. Suárez (yellow card) 76'; Busquets (yellow card) 90'	Stadium: Stamford Bridge; Attendance: 37,741; Referee: Cüneyt Çakır (Turkey)

14 March 2018 Second leg	Barcelona (Spain)	3–0 (4–1 agg.)	(England) Chelsea	Barcelona, Spain
20:45 CET	Messi 3', 63'; Dembélé 20'; Roberto (yellow card) 22'	Report	Willian (yellow card) 45'; Giroud (yellow card) 49'; Alonso (yellow card) 75'	Stadium: Camp Nou; Attendance: 97,183; Referee: Damir Skomina (Slovenia)

== Statistics ==
=== Appearances ===
No.	Pos.	Name	Premier League		FA Cup		EFL Cup		Champions League		Community Shield		Total		Discipline	
No.	Pos.	Name	Apps	Goals	Apps	Goals	Apps	Goals	Apps	Goals	Apps	Goals	Apps	Goals	Yellow card	Red card
1	GK	(Argentina) Willy Caballero	3	0	6	0	4	0	0	0	0	0	13	0	0	0
2	DF	(Germany) Antonio Rüdiger	27	2	6	0	5	1	6	0	1	0	45	3	6	0
3	DF	(Spain) Marcos Alonso	33	7	3	1	2	0	7	0	1	0	46	8	9	0
4	MF	(Spain) Cesc Fàbregas	32	2	4	0	4	0	8	1	1	0	49	3	6	1
6	MF	(England) Danny Drinkwater	12	1	4	0	3	0	3	0	0	0	22	1	0	0
7	MF	(France) N'Golo Kanté	34	1	5	0	2	0	6	0	1	0	48	1	4	0
8	MF	(England) Ross Barkley	2	0	1	0	1	0	0	0	0	0	4	0	0	0
9	FW	(Spain) Álvaro Morata	31	11	6	2	3	1	7	1	1	0	48	15	10	1
10	MF	(Belgium) Eden Hazard	34	12	5	1	4	1	8	3	0	0	51	17	3	0
11	MF	(Spain) Pedro	31	4	6	2	3	0	7	1	1	0	48	7	2	2
13	GK	(Belgium) Thibaut Courtois	35	0	1	0	1	0	8	0	1	0	46	0	3	0
14	MF	(France) Tiémoué Bakayoko	29	2	5	0	4	0	5	1	0	0	43	3	6	1
15	MF	(Nigeria) Victor Moses	25 (3)	3	3	0	2	0	4	0	1	1	35 (3)	4	5	0
18	FW	(France) Olivier Giroud	6 (7)	3	3 (1)	2	0	0	1	0	0	0	10 (8)	5	1	0
21	DF	(Italy) Davide Zappacosta	12 (10)	1	4	0	3 (1)	0	4 (1)	1	0	0	23 (12)	2	2	0
22	MF	(Brazil) Willian	20 (16)	6	5 (1)	2	3 (1)	2	4 (4)	3	1	0	33 (22)	13	4	0
24	DF	(England) Gary Cahill	24 (3)	0	5 (1)	0	3	0	5 (1)	0	1	0	38 (5)	0	3	1
27	DF	(Denmark) Andreas Christensen	23 (4)	0	2 (1)	0	4	0	5 (1)	0	0	0	34 (6)	0	0	0
28	DF	(Spain) César Azpilicueta	37	2	4	0	2	0	8	1	1	0	52	3	2	0
30	DF	(Brazil) David Luiz	9 (1)	1	2	0	0	0	4	1	1	0	16 (1)	2	6	1
33	DF	(Italy) Emerson	3 (2)	0	2	0	0	0	0	0	0	0	5 (2)	0	0	0
36	MF	(United States) Kyle Scott	0	0	0 (1)	0	0	0	0	0	0	0	0 (1)	0	1	0
37	GK	(Portugal) Eduardo	0	0	0	0	0	0	0	0	0	0	0	0	0	0
44	MF	(Wales) Ethan Ampadu	0 (1)	0	2 (1)	0	2 (1)	0	0	0	0	0	4 (3)	0	1	0
50	DF	(England) Trevoh Chalobah	0	0	0	0	0	0	0	0	0	0	0	0	0	0
66	DF	(England) Dujon Sterling	0	0	0 (1)	0	0 (1)	0	0	0	0	0	0 (2)	0	0	0
70	MF	(England) Callum Hudson-Odoi	0 (2)	0	0 (2)	0	0	0	0	0	0	0	0 (4)	0	0	0
Players who left the club in August/January transfer window or on loan
16	MF	(Brazil) Kenedy	0	0	2	0	3	1	0	0	0	0	5	1	0	0
17	MF	(Belgium) Charly Musonda	0 (3)	0	0 (1)	0	2	1	0	0	0 (1)	0	2 (5)	1	0	0
23	FW	(Belgium) Michy Batshuayi	3 (9)	2	3	3	3 (2)	3	1 (3)	2	1	0	11 (14)	10	0	0
35	DF	(England) Jake Clarke-Salter	0	0	0	0	0 (1)	0	0	0	0	0	0 (1)	0	0	0
38	MF	(Ivory Coast) Jérémie Boga	1	0	0	0	0	0	0	0	0	0	1	0	0	0

Last updated: 19 May 2018.
Source: Chelsea F.C.

=== Top scorers ===
The list is sorted by shirt number when total goals are equal.

Rnk	Pos	No.	Player	Premier League	FA Cup	EFL Cup	Champions League	Community Shield	Total
1	MF	10	(Belgium) Eden Hazard	12	1	1	3	0	17
2	FW	9	(Spain) Álvaro Morata	11	2	1	1	0	15
3	MF	22	(Brazil) Willian	6	2	2	3	0	13
4	FW	23	(Belgium) Michy Batshuayi	2	3	3	2	0	10
5	DF	3	(Spain) Marcos Alonso	7	1	0	0	0	8
6	MF	11	(Spain) Pedro	4	2	0	1	0	7
7	FW	18	(France) Olivier Giroud	3	2	0	0	0	5
8	MF	15	(Nigeria) Victor Moses	3	0	0	0	1	4
9	DF	2	(Germany) Antonio Rüdiger	2	0	1	0	0	3
9	DF	28	(Spain) César Azpilicueta	2	0	0	1	0	3
9	MF	4	(Spain) Cesc Fàbregas	2	0	0	1	0	3
9	MF	14	(France) Tiémoué Bakayoko	2	0	0	1	0	3
13	DF	21	(Italy) Davide Zappacosta	1	0	0	1	0	2
13	DF	30	(Brazil) David Luiz	1	0	0	1	0	2
15	MF	6	(England) Danny Drinkwater	1	0	0	0	0	1
15	MF	7	(France) N'Golo Kanté	1	0	0	0	0	1
15	MF	16	(Brazil) Kenedy	0	0	1	0	0	1
15	MF	17	(Belgium) Charly Musonda	0	0	1	0	0	1
Own goals				2	0	0	2	0	4
Total				62	13	10	17	1	103

Last updated: 19 May 2018.
Source: Chelsea F.C.

=== Clean sheets ===
The list is sorted by shirt number when total clean sheets are equal.

Rnk	No.	Player	Premier League	FA Cup	EFL Cup	Champions League	Community Shield	Total
1	13	(Belgium) Thibaut Courtois	15	1	1	2	0	19
2	1	(Argentina) Willy Caballero	1	4	0	0	0	5

Last updated: 19 May 2018.
Source: Chelsea F.C.

=== Summary ===
Games played	59 (38 Premier League) (7 FA Cup) (5 EFL Cup) (8 Champions League) (1 Community Shield)
Games won	32 (21 Premier League) (5 FA Cup) (3 EFL Cup) (3 Champions League)
Games drawn	14 (7 Premier League) (2 FA Cup) (1 EFL Cup) (3 Champions League) (1 Community Shield)
Games lost	13 (10 Premier League) (1 EFL Cup) (2 Champions League)
Goals scored	103 (62 Premier League) (13 FA Cup) (10 EFL Cup) (17 Champions League) (1 Community Shield)
Goals conceded	58 (38 Premier League) (2 FA Cup) (5 EFL Cup) (12 Champions League) (1 Community Shield)
Goal difference	+45 (+24 Premier League) (+11 FA Cup) (+5 EFL Cup) (+5 Champions League)
Clean sheets	24 (16 Premier League) (5 FA Cup) (1 EFL Cup) (2 Champions League)
Yellow cards	74 (44 Premier League) (9 FA Cup) (8 EFL Cup) (10 Champions League) (3 Community Shield)
Red cards	7 (4 Premier League) (2 FA Cup) (1 Community Shield)
Most appearances	(Brazil) Willian (55 appearances)
Top scorer	(Belgium) Eden Hazard (17 goals)
Winning Percentage	Overall: 32/59 (54.2%)

Last updated: 19 May 2018.
Source: Chelsea F.C.

== Awards ==
=== Player ===
No.	Player	Award	Month	Source
22	(Brazil) Willian	Premier League Goal of the Month	January	
3	(Spain) Marcos Alonso	PFA Team of the Year	2017–18	

=== Manager ===
Manager	Award	Month	Source
