= Sten Christensen =

Danish footballer (born 1965)

Personal information
- Date of birth: 18 December 1965 (age 60)
- Place of birth: Denmark
- Height: 1.89 m (6 ft 2 in)
- Position: Goalkeeper

Senior career*
Years	Team	Apps	(Gls)
1992	Brøndby	4	(0)
- Hvidovre
- * Club domestic league appearances and goals

Sten Christensen (born 18 December 1965) is a Danish former professional footballer who played as a goalkeeper.

== Club career ==
In 1992, Christensen joined Brøndby. Christensen made his debut for the club on 16 August 1992 in a 3–3 Superligaen draw against Frem. During his time at Brøndby, Christensen would make three more Superligaen appearances for the club, primarily serving as a deputy to Mogens Krogh. Christensen would later join Hvidovre, making 15 league appearances in the 1996–97 Danish Superliga season, following Hvidovre's promotion to the top flight.

== Coaching career ==
In 2008, Christensen returned to Brøndby as a goalkeeping coach.

In July 2012, English club Chelsea recruited Christensen as a scout, whilst he was still employed at Brøndby. A subsequent 2018 investigation by Football Leaks and Danish newspaper Politiken revealed there was no evidence Christensen performed any scouting duties whilst employed at the club on an £11,400 per month salary. Christensen left Brøndby at the end of 2018.

== Personal life ==
Christensen's son, Andreas, is a current international footballer for Denmark.
