= Andreas Christensen =

Danish footballer (born 1996)

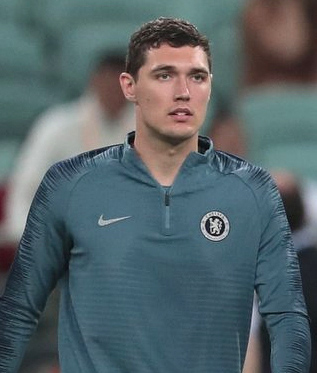
- Christensen with Chelsea in 2019

Personal information
- Full name: Andreas Bødtker Christensen
- Date of birth: 10 April 1996 (age 30)
- Place of birth: Blovstrød, Denmark
- Height: 1.89 m (6 ft 2 in)
- Position: Centre-back

Team information
- Current team: Barcelona
- Number: 15

Youth career
- Blovstrød
- 2000–2006: Skjold Birkerød
- 2006–2012: Brøndby
- 2012–2014: Chelsea

Senior career*
Years	Team	Apps	(Gls)
2014–2022	Chelsea	93	(0)
2015–2017	→ Borussia; Mönchengladbach (loan)	62	(5)
2022–	Barcelona	78	(3)

International career^{‡}
2011–2012	Denmark U16	2	(0)
2011–2012	Denmark U17	18	(5)
2013	Denmark U19	2	(0)
2013–2015	Denmark U21	21	(1)
2015–	Denmark	81	(4)
- * Club domestic league appearances and goals as of 02:53, 17 September 2026 (UTC) ‡ National team caps and goals as of 19:54, 7 June 2026 (UTC)

Andreas Bødtker Christensen (Danish pronunciation: [ˈænˌdʁe̝ː.æs ˈkʁesn̩sn̩]; born 10 April 1996) is a Danish professional footballer who plays as a centre-back for La Liga club Barcelona and the Denmark national team.

Christensen began his career at Skjold Birkerød and later joined Brøndby. He joined Chelsea at the age of 15 in February 2012, making his professional debut in October 2014. After a two-year loan to German club Borussia Mönchengladbach, he returned to Chelsea in 2017, winning the FA Cup, UEFA Europa League and UEFA Champions League with the club. In 2022, he was signed by Barcelona, where he won La Liga in his debut season.

Christensen made his full international debut for Denmark in June 2015, and represented the nation at the 2018 FIFA World Cup, UEFA Euro 2020, the 2022 World Cup and Euro 2024.

== Club career ==
=== Chelsea ===
==== Early career ====
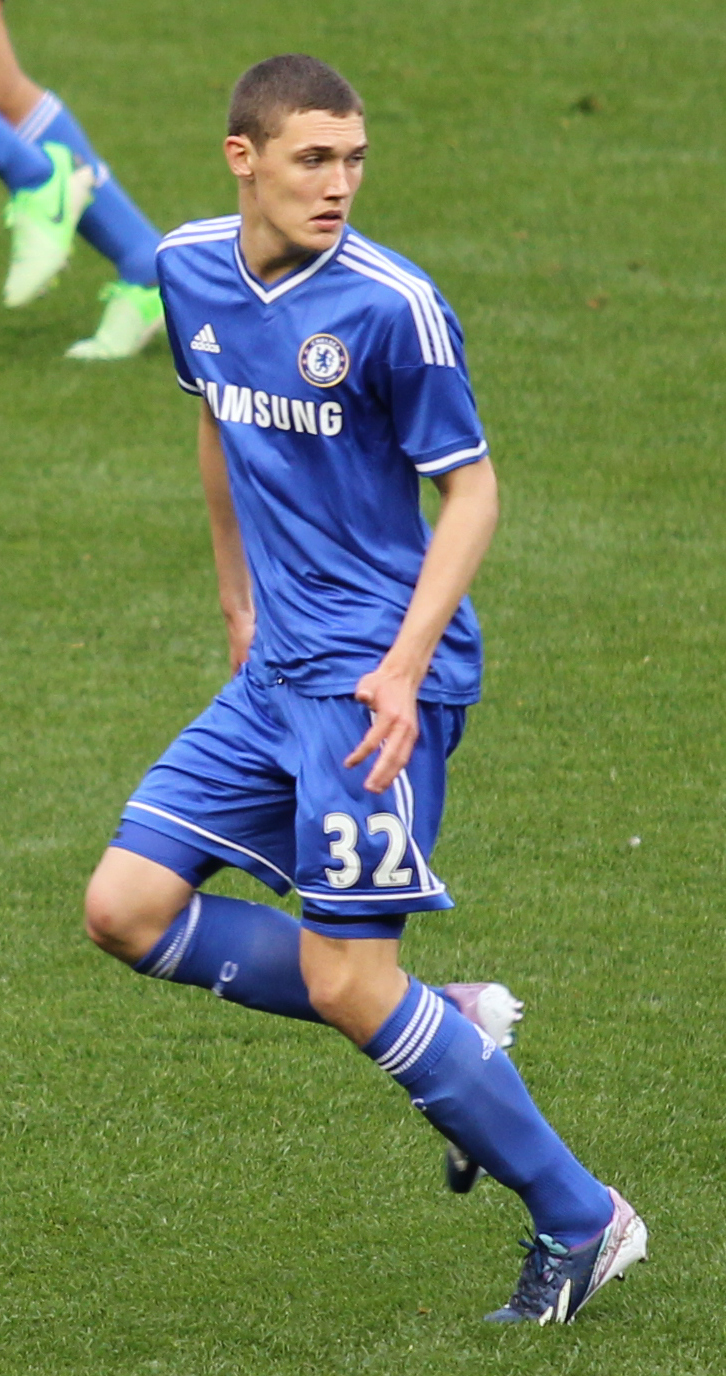
Christensen playing for Chelsea in 2013

Christensen was born in Lillerød, Allerød Municipality. The son of former Brøndby goalkeeper Sten Christensen, he began his career with Skjold Birkerød and later joined Brøndby. He spent eight years there, attracting the interest of Europe's elite clubs including Arsenal, Chelsea, Manchester City, and Bayern Munich.

On 7 February 2012, Christensen signed for Chelsea on a free transfer, near the end of André Villas-Boas' tenure as the club's manager. Upon joining the London side, Christensen said: "I have chosen Chelsea because they play the kind of football I like."

Christensen was first included in a Chelsea senior squad for their last game of the 2012–13 season on 19 May 2013, but did not feature in the match, which ended a 2–1 home win over Everton in Rafael Benítez's last match as manager. In the pre-season tour of the United States before the 2013–14 season, he was part of the senior team squad and signed a professional contract thereafter.

==== 2014–15 season ====
He made his professional debut on 28 October 2014, playing 79 minutes at right-back as Chelsea won 2–1 away to Shrewsbury Town in the fourth round of the League Cup. Christensen did not play again until 24 January 2015, when he was utilised in the same position for Chelsea's 4–2 home defeat to League One team Bradford City in the FA Cup fourth round.

Although Christensen played no further part in the campaign, Chelsea won the League Cup with a 2–0 victory over rival club Tottenham Hotspur in the final. When asked who was man of the match for the final, manager José Mourinho said, "Man of the match was Andreas Christensen who played well against Shrewsbury. There are more than John Terry (the official Man of the match for the final) because we are a team. I am proud of the guys."

On 13 April 2015, Christensen played for Chelsea U19 in the final of the 2014–15 UEFA Youth League against Shakhtar Donetsk in Switzerland and although he scored an own goal to cancel out Izzy Brown's opener in the first half, Chelsea still ended with a 3–2 victory. He made his Premier League debut against Sunderland on 24 May, replacing Mikel John Obi with 12 minutes remaining in a 3–1 home victory. Although Christensen only made one league appearances out of the whole season, Mourinho stated that he would receive a replica medal from his club for his contributions this season.

==== 2015–2017: Loan to Borussia Mönchengladbach ====
On 10 July 2015, Christensen joined Borussia Mönchengladbach on a two-year loan deal from Chelsea. He made his debut on 10 August against FC St. Pauli in the first round of the DFB-Pokal, winning 4–1. Five days later, Christensen made his Bundesliga debut in a 4–0 loss at Borussia Dortmund. He scored his first professional goals on 5 February 2016, a brace in a 5–1 win over Werder Bremen at Borussia-Park.

After an impressive debut season, Christensen was voted the team's Player of the Season, ahead of Granit Xhaka, the team captain. After the success of his first season, Mönchengladbach made multiple attempts to make his loan permanent during the 2016 summer transfer window, although it was reported that Chelsea rejected the £14.25 million bid from the German club. In the 2016–17 UEFA Europa League, Christensen scored the final goal of a 4–2 win away to Fiorentina in the second leg of the last 32 to assure a 4–3 aggregate win. He was on target again in the next round against neighbours Schalke, who won on away goals after a 3–3 aggregate draw.

==== 2017–2022: Return to Chelsea ====
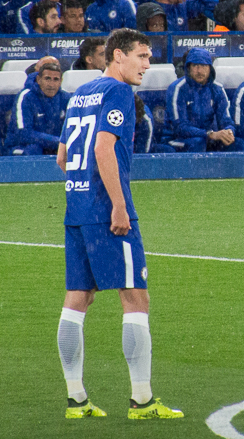
Christensen playing for Chelsea in 2017

On 12 August 2017, Christensen made his first appearance for Chelsea following his two-year loan spell in Germany, coming off the bench following captain Gary Cahill being sent off, in Chelsea's 3–2 opening day home defeat against Burnley. Eight days later, he made his first Premier League start in a 2–1 victory over Tottenham Hotspur at Wembley Stadium.

On 9 January 2018, Christensen signed a new four-and-a-half-year deal with Chelsea running until 2022, after establishing himself in the first team. Christensen made 40 appearances for the Blues in 2017–18, including three in the victorious FA Cup campaign. However, a back injury meant he was not involved in the final. Prior to the season's finish, he was awarded the club's Young Player of the Year award. New manager Maurizio Sarri preferred to pair David Luiz and Antonio Rüdiger in central defence, and by February 2019 Christensen had made 15 appearances, only two of which in the league. However, he ruled out wanting to leave the club.

On 29 May 2021, Christensen replaced the injured Thiago Silva in the 39th minute as he won his first-ever UEFA Champions League after Chelsea won 1–0 against Manchester City in the 2021 UEFA Champions League Final in Porto. On 20 October 2021, Christensen scored his first goal for Chelsea in a 4–0 win against Malmö FF in the group stage of the Champions League.

=== Barcelona ===
On 4 July 2022, Christensen signed for La Liga club Barcelona in a free transfer on a four-year contract with a buyout clause of €500 million. On 13 August, he made his debut in 0–0 draw against Rayo Vallecano in the league. He began playing more consistently as the season progressed, and eventually formed a defensive partnership alongside Ronald Araújo, helping Barcelona keep the most clean sheets (16) in all of Europe's top 5 leagues.

He was named Danish Football Player of the Year for 2023, having won the La Liga title and the Supercopa de España with his club. Following poor performances from teammate Oriol Romeu and poor general defensive performances, culminating in narrow wins and a shock 3–5 home defeat to Villarreal, Xavi moved Christensen to defensive midfielder, which managed to improve Barcelona's form, including emphatic victories against Napoli in the Champions League and rivals Atlético Madrid.

On 10 April 2024, he scored his first Champions League goal with Barcelona, after coming off the bench in the second half, which granted his club a 3–2 away win against Paris Saint-Germain in the quarter-final first leg.

On 21 December 2025, it was announced Christensen had suffered a partial Anterior cruciate ligament tear during training and would be out for several months. On 1 July 2026, he extended his contract with the club until 2028. A month later, on 31 August, he made his 100th appearance for the club in a 5–2 victory over Rayo Vallecano.

== International career ==
On 8 June 2015, Christensen made his senior international debut for Denmark in a 2–1 home friendly win against Montenegro at the Viborg Stadium, as a 69th-minute substitute for Pierre-Emile Højbjerg. On 24 March 2016, Christensen made his first Denmark start in a 2–1 victory over Iceland, playing the full 90 minutes of the friendly at the MCH Arena.

Christensen played six matches in Denmark's successful 2018 FIFA World Cup qualification campaign. On 14 November 2017 he scored his first international goal to equalise in a 5–1 win over the Republic of Ireland in the second leg of the play-off. Manager Åge Hareide called him up for the final tournament in Russia. He partnered Simon Kjær in central defence, having been able to play in that position due to Andreas Bjelland's absence through injury, but played in defensive midfield in the final group game against France. In the last 16 against Croatia, he remained in midfield to combat the opponents' strength in that sector, but made an error that allowed Mario Mandžukić to equalise as Croatia went on to win on penalties.

Christensen was one of the key players for Denmark during their very successful UEFA Euro 2020 campaign, as he played all six games. On 21 June 2021, Christensen scored a thunderous goal from long range against Russia in a 4–1 win that helped Denmark advance to the knockout-phase of the tournament. After having defeated both Wales and the Czech Republic to get there, Denmark lost to England in the semi-final 2–1 after extra time at Wembley Stadium.

In November 2022, Christensen was selected in Denmark's squad for the 2022 FIFA World Cup. He started all three of the team's matches in Qatar, scoring in the 2–1 loss to France in their second Group D fixture.

At UEFA Euro 2024, Christensen again started in all of Denmark's matches as they were knocked out by hosts Germany at the round of 16.

== Style of play ==
Christensen is a centre-back and is known for his calmness in possession and precise passing, as well as his aerial dominance. In 2018, Chelsea manager Antonio Conte said the Dane had displayed "great maturity" adding that he has "a lot of trust in Christensen. This player is a player for the present for Chelsea, and for Chelsea's future for 10 or 14 years. He can also become the captain of this team in the future". In appreciation of his playing talents, fans have also labelled him as the 'Danish Maldini', drawing comparisons with the Italian defender Paolo Maldini.

He is also known for his versatility and has been used both as a midfielder and as a right back on occasions.

== Career statistics ==
=== Club ===
As of match played 8 November 2026

Appearances and goals by club, season and competition
Club	Season	League			National cup (Note: Includes DFB-Pokal, FA Cup, Copa del Rey)		League cup (Note: Includes Football League/EFL Cup)		Europe		Other		Total	
Club	Season	Division	Apps	Goals	Apps	Goals	Apps	Goals	Apps	Goals	Apps	Goals	Apps	Goals
Chelsea	2014–15	Premier League	1	0	1	0	1	0	0	0	—		3	0
Chelsea	2017–18	Premier League	27	0	3	0	4	0	6 (Note: Appearance(s) in UEFA Champions League)	0	0	0	40	0
Chelsea	2018–19	Premier League	8	0	2	0	4	0	15 (Note: Appearances in UEFA Europa League)	0	0	0	29	0
Chelsea	2019–20	Premier League	21	0	2	0	0	0	4	0	1 (Note: Appearance in UEFA Super Cup)	0	28	0
Chelsea	2020–21	Premier League	17	0	3	0	0	0	7	0	—		27	0
Chelsea	2021–22	Premier League	19	0	3	1	1	0	8	1	3 (Note: One appearance in UEFA Super Cup, two appearances in FIFA Club World Cup)	0	34	2
Chelsea	Total		93	0	14	1	10	0	40	1	4	0	161	2
Borussia Mönchengladbach (loan)	2015–16	Bundesliga	31	3	3	0	—		5	0	—		39	3
Borussia Mönchengladbach (loan)	2016–17	Bundesliga	31	2	3	0	—		9 (Note: Six appearances in UEFA Champions League, three appearances and two goals in UEFA Europa League)	2	—		43	4
Borussia Mönchengladbach (loan)	Total		62	5	6	0	—		14	2	—		82	7
Barcelona	2022–23	La Liga	23	1	2	0	—		5 (Note: Three appearances in UEFA Champions League, two appearances in UEFA Europa League)	0	2 (Note: Appearances in Supercopa de España)	0	32	1
Barcelona	2023–24	La Liga	30	2	3	0	—		7	1	2	0	42	3
Barcelona	2024–25	La Liga	5	0	0	0	—		1	0	0	0	6	0
Barcelona	2025–26	La Liga	13	0	1	1	—		4	0	0	0	18	1
Barcelona	2026–27	La Liga	7	0	0	0	—		1	0	0	0	8	0
Barcelona	Total		78	3	6	1	—		18	1	4	0	106	5
Career total			230	8	26	2	10	0	72	4	8	0	346	14

=== International ===
As of match played 7 June 2026

Appearances and goals by national team and year
National team	Year	Apps	Goals
Denmark	2015	2	0
Denmark	2016	8	0
Denmark	2017	4	1
Denmark	2018	9	0
Denmark	2019	8	0
Denmark	2020	7	0
Denmark	2021	16	1
Denmark	2022	7	1
Denmark	2023	7	0
Denmark	2024	5	0
Denmark	2025	6	1
Denmark	2026	2	0
Total		81	4

As of match played 8 September 2025
Denmark's score listed first, score column indicates score after each Christensen goal.

List of international goals scored by Andreas Christensen
No.	Date	Venue	Cap	Opponent	Score	Result	Competition	Ref.
1	14 November 2017	Aviva Stadium, Dublin, Ireland	14	Republic of Ireland	1–1	5–1	2018 FIFA World Cup qualification	
2	21 June 2021	Parken Stadium, Copenhagen, Denmark	44	Russia	3–1	4–1	UEFA Euro 2020	
3	26 November 2022	Stadium 974, Doha, Qatar	60	France	1–1	1–2	2022 FIFA World Cup	
4	8 September 2025	Karaiskakis Stadium, Piraeus, Greece	75	Greece	2–0	3–0	2026 FIFA World Cup qualification	

== Honours ==
Chelsea Youth

- FA Youth Cup: 2013–14
- UEFA Youth League: 2014–15

Chelsea

- FA Cup: 2017–18; runner-up: 2019–20, 2020–21
- UEFA Champions League: 2020–21
- UEFA Europa League: 2018–19
- UEFA Super Cup: 2021
- FIFA Club World Cup: 2021
- EFL Cup runner-up: 2018–19

Barcelona

- La Liga: 2022–23, 2024–25, 2025–26
- Copa del Rey: 2024–25
- Supercopa de España: 2023, 2025

Individual

- Danish Talent of the Year: 2015
- Borussia Mönchengladbach Player of the Year: 2015–16
- Chelsea Young Player of the Year: 2017–18
- Danish Football Player of the Year by TV2 and DBU: 2023
- Danish Football Player of the Year: 2023
