= Nicolas Tié =

French-Ivorian footballer (born 2001)

Personal information
- Full name: Nicolas Tié
- Date of birth: 13 February 2001 (age 25)
- Place of birth: Lille, France
- Height: 1.86 m (6 ft 1 in)
- Position: Goalkeeper

Youth career
- Poitiers
- 2017–2020: Chelsea
- 2020–2022: Vitória Guimarães

Senior career*
Years	Team	Apps	(Gls)
2022–2023	Vitória Guimarães B	2	(0)
Total		2	(0)
- * Club domestic league appearances and goals

Nicolas Tié (born 13 February 2001) is a former professional footballer who played as a goalkeeper. Born in France, he represented Ivory Coast internationally.

== Club career ==
Born in Lille, France, he joined English club Chelsea from Poitiers in July 2017, turning professional in July 2018 on a three-year contract.

In August 2020 he signed for Portuguese club Vitória de Guimarães. in January 2022 he was linked with a transfer to Swiss club St. Gallen.

On 1 September 2023, Vitória announced that Tié's contract had been terminated by mutual agreement.

On 25 April 2025, Tié announced that he had retired from football, and had joined the French Army earlier in the month, serving in the 1st Parachute Hussar Regiment.

== International career ==
He was called up by the Ivory Coast national team in October 2018, but withdrew from the squad due to injury. He was selected to the Ivory Coast squad for the delayed 2020 Olympics.
