= Jayden Reid =

Jayden Reid may refer to:

- Jayden Reid (English footballer) (born 2001), English football winger for IFK Mariehamn
- Jayden Reid (American soccer) (born 2001), American soccer left-back for St. Louis City SC

== See also ==
- Jayden Reed (born 2000), American football wide receiver and punt returner for the Green Bay Packers
