= Miguel Fernández (footballer) =

Spanish footballer

Personal information
- Full name: Miguel Fernández Fernández
- Date of birth: 12 August 2000 (age 26)
- Place of birth: Gavà, Spain
- Position: Winger

Youth career
- Cornellà

Senior career*
Years	Team	Apps	(Gls)
2018–2019	Cornellà	1	(0)
2019–2021	Birmingham City	1	(0)
2021	→ Guijuelo (loan)	8	(1)
2021–2022	Huesca B	14	(1)
2022	Badalona	9	(0)
2022–2025	Prat	77	(15)
- * Club domestic league appearances and goals as of 14:56, 30 June 2025 (UTC)

Miguel Fernández Fernández (born 12 August 2000) is a Spanish professional footballer who plays as a left winger.

He made his Segunda División B debut for Cornellà in 2018 before joining English club Birmingham City the following year. He returned to the Segunda B in 2021 on loan to Guijuelo. Released by Birmingham at the end of the 2020–21 season, he then spent six months with Huesca B and six months with Badalona before joining Prat.

== Club career ==
Fernández was born Gavà, Barcelona, Catalonia. He came through the Escola de Fútbol Gavà from 2008 until 2013, when he joined Cornellà. He played and scored in the early rounds of the 2018–19 Copa Federación; the goals included an 88th-minute "wondergoal" into the top corner against Teruel in the round of 16. After sitting through four Segunda División B matches as an unused substitute, manager Xavi Calm gave him his league debut on 22 December 2018; he replaced Carlos Esteve in the 90th minute of a 3–1 win at home to Ebro.

As part of the relationship between Cornellà and Birmingham City, Fernández trained with the English Championship club in January 2019 and again during the close season. In August, he was given a six-month contract with the intention of continuing his development under Calm, who was appointed head coach of Birmingham's under-23 team in July. He scored seven Professional Development League goals during the initial six months, making him joint top scorer (with Odin Bailey), and was rewarded with a new contract to run until the end of the 2019–20 season, with an option for the club to extend it for a further year. Before that season resumed after a three-month suspension due to the COVID-19 pandemic, the club took up their option to extend his contract and Fernández was given a first-team squad number. He was named among the substitutes for the match at home to Charlton Athletic on 15 July, and remained unused, but made his Football League debut in the last match of the season, coming on in stoppage time of a 3–1 defeat at home to Derby County which left Birmingham in 21st position, one point above the relegation places.

By the end of January 2021, Fernández had five goals from 12 appearances for Birmingham's under-23s but no matchday involvement with the first team. On 1 February, he returned to Spanish football with Segunda B club CD Guijuelo, on loan until 30 June. He made his debut as a late substitute in a goalless draw away to Pontevedra on 10 February, and ended the season with 8 appearances. He scored once, with a near-post header following a corner in the final match of the season, which Guijuelo lost 3–1 at home to Lealtad; both teams were already confirmed as playing in the new fourth-tier Segunda RFEF for the 2021–22 season.

Birmingham confirmed that Fernández would leave the club when his contract expired at the end of the season, and he returned to Spanish football with Huesca B of the Segunda División RFEF. He made his debut 75 minutes into the opening-day visit to Terrassa with his side 2–0 down, and his stoppage-time goal made the final score 2–1. He made 14 league appearances during the first half of the season, and then left the club and signed for divisional rivals Badalona, for whom he made 9 appearances. Fernández joined AE Prat, also a fourth-tier club, for the 2022–23 season.

== Career statistics ==
As of match played 9 March 2025

Appearances and goals by club, season and competition
Club	Season	League			National cup		League cup		Other		Total	
Club	Season	Division	Apps	Goals	Apps	Goals	Apps	Goals	Apps	Goals	Apps	Goals
Cornellà	2018–19	Segunda División B	1	0	0	0	—		3 (Note: Appearance(s) in Copa Federación)	2	4	2
Birmingham City	2019–20	Championship	1	0	0	0	0	0	—		1	0
Birmingham City	2020–21	Championship	0	0	0	0	0	0	—		0	0
Birmingham City	Total		1	0	0	0	0	0	—		1	0
Guijuelo (loan)	2020–21	Segunda División B	8	1	—		—		—		8	1
Huesca B	2021–22	Segunda División RFEF	14	1	—		—		—		14	1
Badalona	2021–22	Segunda División RFEF	9	0	—		—		—		9	0
Prat	2022–23	Segunda Federación	15	0	—		—		0	0	15	0
Prat	2023–24	Tercera Federación	25	3	—		—		2 (Note: One appearance in Copa Catalunya, one in Tercera Federación play-offs)	0	27	3
Prat	2024–25	Tercera Federación	23	6	—		—		3 (Note: Two appearances in Copa Catalunya, one appearance and one goal in Copa Federación)	1	26	7
Prat	Total		63	9	—		—		5	1	68	10
Career total			96	11	0	0	—		8	3	104	14
