= Keyendrah Simmonds =

Kittitian footballer (born 2001)

Personal information
- Full name: Keyendrah Qwamalik Tegan Simmonds
- Date of birth: 31 May 2001 (age 25)
- Place of birth: Manchester, England
- Position: Forward

Team information
- Current team: Vukovar 1991

Youth career
- 2009–2021: Manchester City

Senior career*
Years	Team	Apps	(Gls)
2021–2023	Birmingham City	1	(0)
2022–2023	→ Grimsby Town (loan)	8	(0)
2024–	Vukovar 1991	12	(0)

International career^{‡}
- England U15
2018	England U18	5	(1)
2026–	Saint Kitts and Nevis	2	(0)
- * Club domestic league appearances and goals as of 17:25, 8 December 2024 (UTC) ‡ National team caps and goals as of 17:11, 17 November 2026 (UTC)

Keyendrah Qwamalik Tegan Simmonds (born 31 May 2001) is a professional footballer who plays as a forward for Prva NL club Vukovar 1991. Born in England, he represents the Saint Kitts and Nevis national team.

Simmonds was at Manchester City from the age of eight until February 2021, when he signed for Birmingham City. He spent the first half of the 2022–23 season on loan at League Two club Grimsby Town, and was released by Birmingham at the end of that season. He joined Vukovar 1991 in June 2024.

== Club career ==
=== Manchester City ===
Simmonds was born in 2001 in Manchester, and joined Manchester City at the age of eight; his older brother, Okera, was a member of Liverpool's academy. He took up a scholarship with Manchester City in 2017, and in his second year, played and scored regularly for City's under-18 team in the U18 Premier League 2 and appeared twice in the UEFA Youth League. Interviewed in September 2019, he said that Ronaldinho was his childhood idol, that he looked up to and took advice from Raheem Sterling, that he had trained with City's first team, and that his progress had been interrupted by spells of injury.

Simmonds made his debut in open-age football for Manchester City U21 in December 2019 in the 2019–20 EFL Trophy away to Shrewsbury Town. He came on as a 68th-minute substitute (association football), missed chances to score the winning goal, and converted his penalty as City won the shootout 6–5. With one year left on his City contract, there was interest from Premier League and Championship clubs in signing Simmonds, but no move took place. He scored a late goal against Lincoln City to confirm City as winners of their group in the 2020–21 EFL Trophy, but came no closer to first-team football.

=== Birmingham City ===
Simmonds signed a two-and-a-half-year contract with Championship club Birmingham City on 1 February 2021. Manager Aitor Karanka said he would initially be a development squad player while training with the first team. He did not appear in the senior matchday squad until 8 May, when new manager Lee Bowyer selected numerous fringe players for the final match of the season, away to Blackburn Rovers. Birmingham lost 5–2, and Simmonds replaced Amari Miller after 78 minutes to make his Football League debut. He scored three goals from nine appearances for the under-23s, helped them finish as runners-up in the Professional Development League Northern Section, and starred in the play-off final, as Birmingham beat Sheffield United U23 to win the overall title and gain promotion to Premier League 2 for 2021–22.

On 1 September 2022, Simmonds joined Grimsby Town on loan until January 2023. He made his debut two days later as a 71st-minute substitute in a 2–0 win away to Newport County; according to the Grimsby Telegraph, he "got about the pitch well when he came on, but did not have a huge involvement." Simmonds scored Grimsby's only goal in a 1–1 draw with his former club, Manchester City U21, in the EFL Trophy group stage, which Grimsby won on penalties to progress to the round of 32. He played eight times in the league, starting only once and without scoring, before returning to Birmingham in January 2023.

Simmonds was one of 13 professionals released at the end of the 2022–23 season.

=== Vukovar 1991 ===
Simmonds signed for Prva NL (Croatian second-tier) club Vukovar 1991 in June 2024.

== International career ==
Simmonds represented England at under-15 level, and was called up for the under-18s in September 2018 for the Limoges Tournament. He played in all three matches, and scored in the second, a 3–0 win against Russia. He kept his place for two matches against Sweden and the Czech Republic in October.

In 2026, Simmonds switched allegiance to Saint Kitts and Nevis, and he made his debut for their senior team in a 3–2 loss against Grenada.

== Career statistics ==
As of end of 2022–23 season

Appearances and goals by club, season and competition
Club	Season	League			FA Cup		EFL Cup		Other		Total	
Club	Season	Division	Apps	Goals	Apps	Goals	Apps	Goals	Apps	Goals	Apps	Goals
Manchester City U21	2019–20	—	—		—		—		2 (Note: Appearance(s) in the EFL Trophy)	0	2	0
Manchester City U21	2020–21	—	—		—		—		1	1	1	1
Manchester City U21	Total		—		—		—		3	1	3	1
Birmingham City	2020–21	Championship	1	0	0	0	0	0	—		1	0
Birmingham City	2021–22	Championship	0	0	0	0	1	0	—		1	0
Birmingham City	2022–23	Championship	0	0	0	0	0	0	—		0	0
Birmingham City	Total		1	0	0	0	1	0	0	0	2	0
Grimsby Town (loan)	2022–23	League Two	8	0	2	0	0	0	3	1	13	1
Career total			9	0	2	0	1	0	6	2	18	2
