= Jack Concannon (footballer) =

English association football player (born 2000)

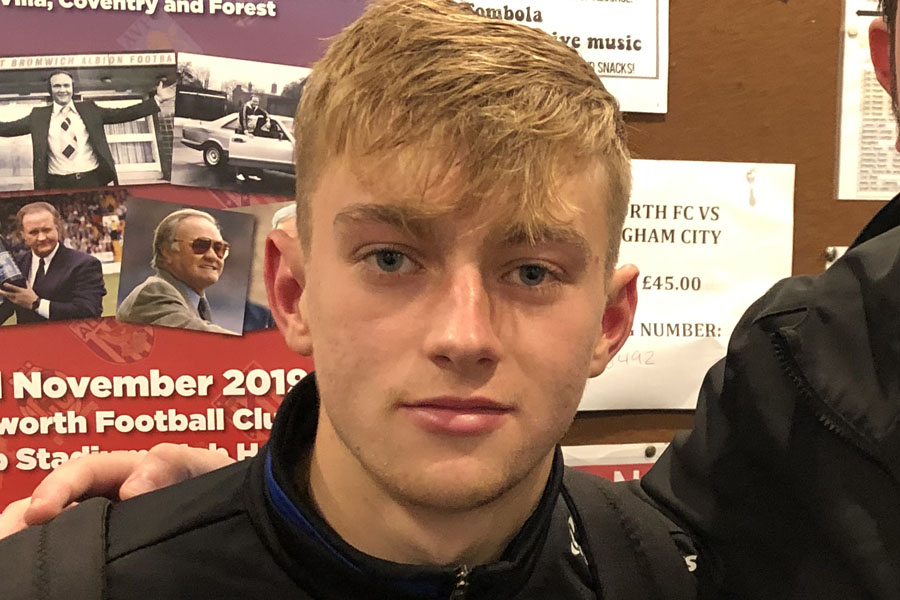
- Concannon in October 2019

Personal information
- Full name: Jack Paul Concannon
- Date of birth: 26 January 2000 (age 26)
- Place of birth: Hagley, England
- Position: Midfielder

Team information
- Current team: Walsall Wood

Youth career
- 2007–2018: Birmingham City

Senior career*
Years	Team	Apps	(Gls)
2018–2021	Birmingham City	0	(0)
2018	→ Sutton Coldfield Town (loan)	3	(0)
2018–2019	→ Tamworth (loan)	21	(5)
2021–2022	Tamworth	34	(2)
2022–2024	Alvechurch	57	(3)
2024	→ Redditch United (loan)	9	(1)
2024–	Walsall Wood	7	(0)
- * Club domestic league appearances and goals as of 12:58, 22 September 2024 (UTC)

Jack Paul Concannon (born 26 January 2000) is an English footballer who plays as a midfielder for Midland League Division Three side Walsall Wood.

== Playing career ==
=== Birmingham City ===
Concannon was born in Hagley, Worcestershire. He joined Birmingham City F.C.'s Academy at the age of seven, worked his way up through the youth system, and took up a two-year scholarship in July 2016. Academy coach Steve Spooner described him as "a very good central midfielder that has great understanding of the game both technically and tactically [with] a good engine [and] competitive". In his first year, he scored four goals in 19 appearances for Birmingham's under-18 team, and in his second, he helped Birmingham's youth team reach the semi-final of the 2017–18 FA Youth Cup, and played in both legs as Chelsea outclassed Birmingham 7–0 on aggregate. Where other second-year scholars were offered professional contracts, concerns about Concannon's lack of physicality meant he received a third scholarship year.

==== Sutton Coldfield Town (loan) ====
Concannon was anxious to go out on loan to demonstrate his ability to cope physically in men's football, and signed for Sutton Coldfield Town of the Southern League Division One Central on work experience in August 2018.

==== Tamworth (loan) ====
He moved up a level to join Southern League Premier Division Central side Tamworth on an initial one-month loan on 14 December 2018. He made his Tamworth debut on 22 December in a league fixture at home to St Ives Town, which the away side won 2–1, and coped sufficiently well with men's football that his loan deal was systematically extended to the end of the season, during which he scored five goals from 21 league appearances. The club's manager, Gary Smith, was appreciative: "He's been a fantastic player for us, someone with a great attitude and appetite for the game. He's still learning and growing in stature but he has been absolutely fantastic – a really clever player with great feet."

==== Return to Birmingham City ====
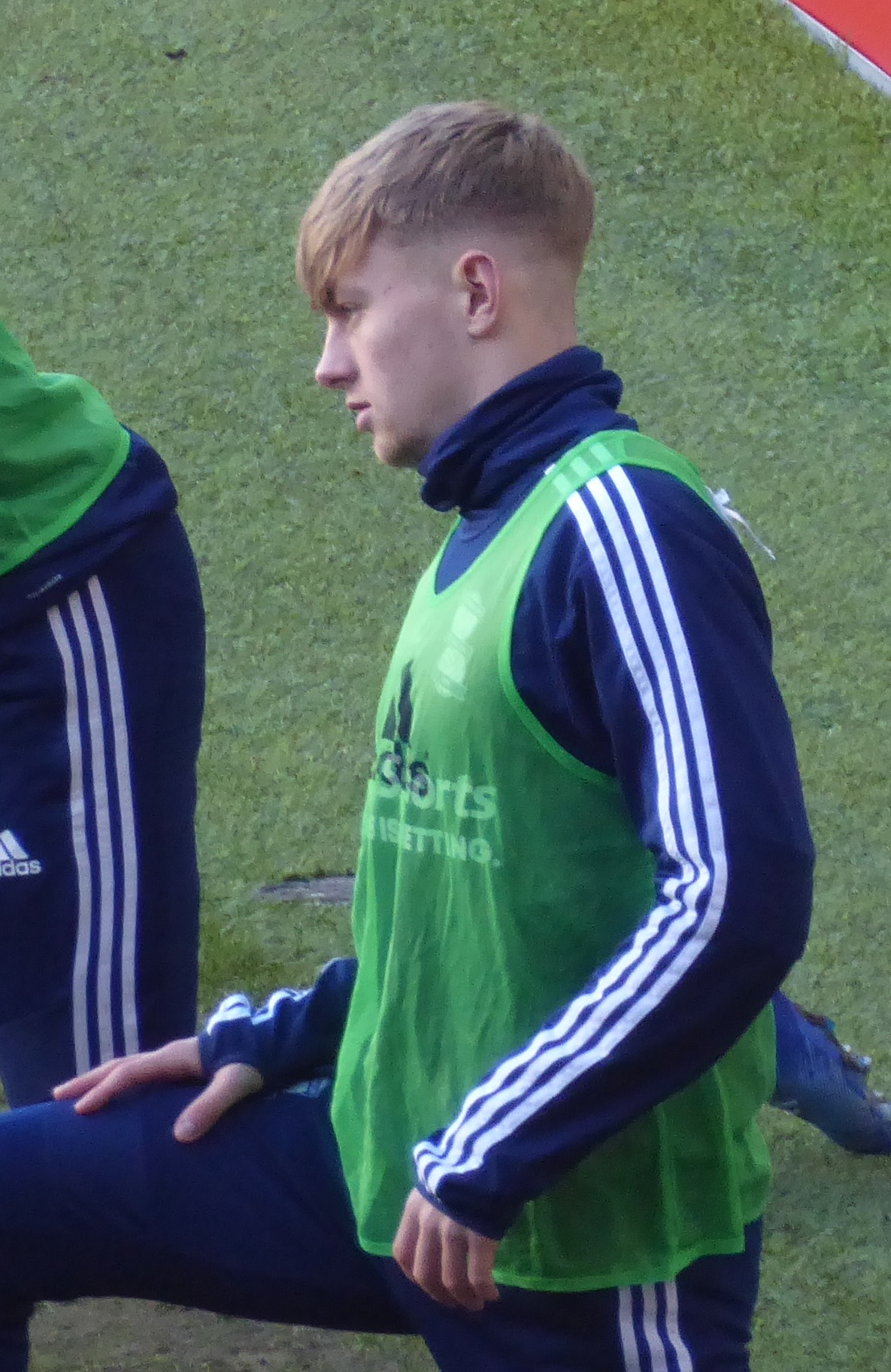
Concannon with Birmingham City in 2020

On 24 May 2019, Concannon signed his first professional contract with Birmingham City, of one year. He was an unused substitute for the first team on 1 February 2020, and made his competitive debut for Birmingham three days later in the starting eleven for the FA Cup fourth-round replay against Coventry City. He was booked for a foul after 26 minutes and was substituted after 57 minutes for Jérémie Bela. The score was 2–2 after extra time, and Birmingham won the tie on penalties.

Concannon signed another one-year contract in July 2020. He had no further matchday involvement with the first team, and in May 2021, Birmingham confirmed that Concannon would leave the club when his contract expired at the end of the season.

=== Tamworth ===
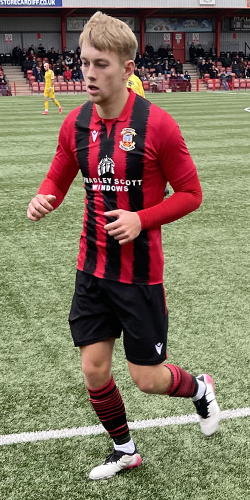
Concannon playing for Tamworth in October 2021.

Concannon re-signed for Southern League Premier Division Central side Tamworth on 9 August 2021. Concannon made his second debut for Tamworth on 14 August 2021, the opening day of the Southern League Premier Division Central season away at Royston Town, playing the full match in a disappointing 3–0 defeat for his new side.

Concannon starred in the following Southern League Premier Division Central fixture on 17 August 2021 at home to Coalville Town, as he scored his first goal of the season to tie the scores at 1-1, finishing a lovely shot from outside the area, the match finished 1-1.

Jack performed very well again in the clubs next Southern League Premier Division Central fixture at home to Lowestoft Town on 21 August 2021. Tamworth sealed a very impressive 6–1 victory, and despite a Dan Creaney hat trick, Concannon was named man of the match.

Concannon's second goal for Tamworth came on 26 March 2022, in a home Southern League Premier Division Central match against Needham Market. Jack was introduced as a 75th-minute substitute for the already cautioned Gift Mussa and capped off an impressive 5–2 victory for the club, scoring the final goal of the match deep into injury time.

=== Alvechurch ===
On 13 June 2022, Concannon was announced as signing for fellow Southern League Premier Division Central side Alvechurch.

In February 2024, Concannon joined Redditch United on an initial one-month loan deal, later extended until the end of the season.

=== Walsall Wood ===
In May 2024, Concannon joined Northern Premier League Division One Midlands club Walsall Wood.

== Career statistics ==
As of match played 21 September 2024

Appearances and goals by club, season and competition
Club	Season	League			FA Cup		League Cup		Other		Total	
Club	Season	Division	Apps	Goals	Apps	Goals	Apps	Goals	Apps	Goals	Apps	Goals
Birmingham City	2018–19	Championship	0	0	0	0	0	0	—		0	0
Birmingham City	2019–20	Championship	0	0	1	0	0	0	—		1	0
Birmingham City	2020–21	Championship	0	0	0	0	0	0	—		0	0
Birmingham City	Total		0	0	1	0	0	0	—		1	0
Sutton Coldfield Town (loan)	2018–19	Southern League Division One Central	3	0	1	0	—		1 (Note: One appearance in Southern League Cup)	0	5	0
Tamworth (loan)	2018–19	Southern League Premier Division Central	21	5	—		—		0	0	21	5
Tamworth	2021–22	Southern League Premier Division Central	34	2	4	0	—		2 (Note: One appearance in FA Trophy, one in Birmingham Senior Cup)	0	40	2
Alvechurch	2022–23	Southern League Premier Division Central	36	3	6	1	—		5 (Note: Three appearances and one goal in FA Trophy, two appearances and one goal in Birmingham Senior Cup)	2	47	6
Alvechurch	2023–24	Southern League Premier Division Central	21	0	2	1	—		3 (Note: Two appearances in FA Trophy, one in Worcestershire Senior Cup)	0	26	1
Alvechurch	Total		57	3	8	2	0	0	8	2	73	7
Redditch United (loan)	2023–24	Southern League Premier Division Central	9	1	—		—		0	0	9	1
Walsall Wood	2024–25	Northern Premier League Div. One Midlands	7	0	2	0	—		2 (Note: Appearance in FA Trophy)	0	11	0
Career total			131	11	16	2	0	0	13	2	160	15
