= Jonathan Leko =

English footballer (born 1999)

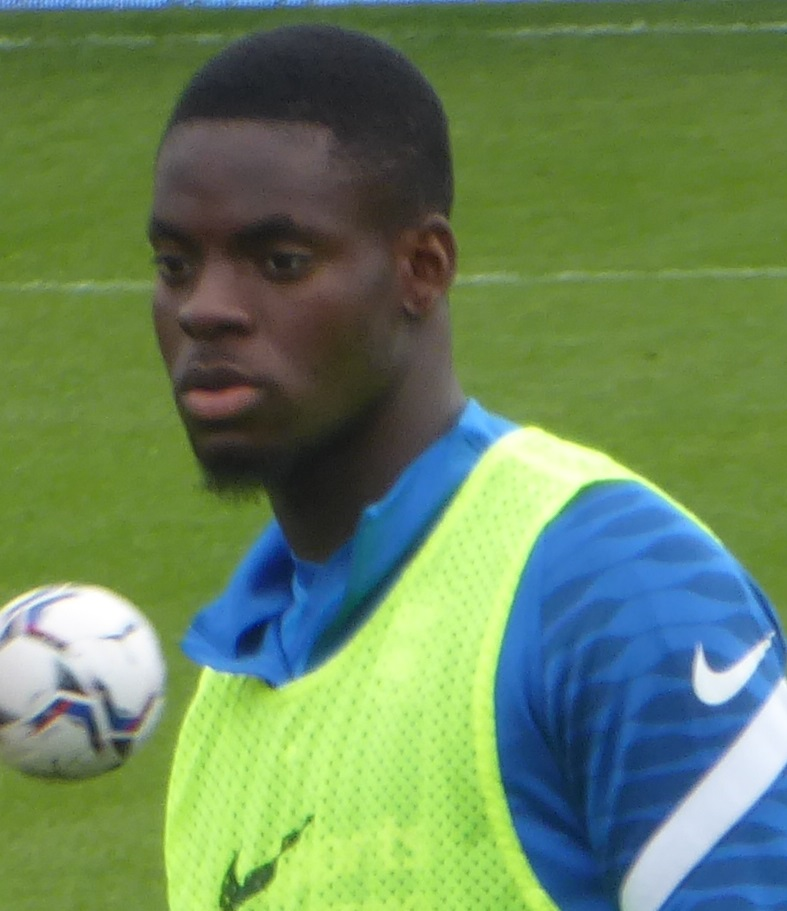
- Leko with Birmingham City in 2021

Personal information
- Full name: Jonathan Kisolokele Leko
- Date of birth: 24 April 1999 (age 27)
- Place of birth: Kinshasa, DR Congo
- Height: 6 ft 0 in (1.82 m)
- Positions: Winger; forward

Team information
- Current team: Penybont
- Number: 11

Youth career
- 2010–2015: West Bromwich Albion

Senior career*
| Years | Team | Apps | (Gls) |
| 2015–2020 | West Bromwich Albion | 16 | (0) |
| 2017–2018 | → Bristol City (loan) | 11 | (0) |
| 2019–2020 | → Charlton Athletic (loan) | 21 | (5) |
| 2020–2023 | Birmingham City | 46 | (0) |
| 2021–2022 | → Charlton Athletic (loan) | 25 | (2) |
| 2023–2026 | Milton Keynes Dons | 67 | (7) |
| 2024 | → Burton Albion (loan) | 1 | (0) |
| 2026– | Penybont | 8 | (1) |

International career^{‡}
| 2013–2015 | England U16 | 11 | (0) |
| 2014–2016 | England U17 | 15 | (2) |
| 2016–2017 | England U18 | 8 | (0) |
| 2017–2019 | England U19 | 4 | (0) |
| 2019 | England U20 | 3 | (0) |
- * Club domestic league appearances and goals as of 08:19, 8 November 2026 (UTC) ‡ National team caps and goals as of 17:10, 29 August 2025 (UTC)

Jonathan Kisolokele Leko (born 24 April 1999) is a professional footballer who plays as a forward or winger for Cymru Premier club Penybont.

He began his career with West Bromwich Albion, made his senior debut as a 16-year-old in 2015, and spent time on loan at Bristol City and Charlton Athletic. He joined Birmingham City in 2020, and had a spell on loan at Charlton Athletic in 2021 before signing for Milton Keynes Dons in 2023, from where he had a loan spell at Burton Albion.

Leko was born in the Democratic Republic of the Congo and grew up in England from the age of eight. He represented England at all levels up to under-20.

== Early life ==
Leko was born in 1999 in Kinshasa, in the Democratic Republic of the Congo. He came to England at the age of eight with his father, who was granted asylum. He grew up in the Nechells area of Birmingham, and after he joined West Bromwich Albion's football academy, he was educated at Sandwell Academy, opposite the club's stadium.

== Club career ==
=== West Bromwich Albion ===
Leko joined West Bromwich Albion at the age of 11. According to the club's academy manager, Mark Harrison, he was "a bit of a rough diamond", but by the under-14s he had developed an understanding of the game and was showing considerable creative ability. He was included in the first team's 2015 pre-season tour of Austria, during which he came off the bench in a 3–1 loss against Red Bull Salzburg.

Leko made his competitive debut on 23 September 2015 as a 77th-minute substitute in a League Cup defeat to Norwich City. On 2 April 2016, he was named in the matchday squad against Sunderland, and came on for Saido Berahino in the 78th minute to make his Premier League debut at the age of 16 years and 344 days. When he took the field on 30 April against West Ham United, Leko became the first player born in 1999 to start a Premier League match. In the last match of the season, a 1–1 draw with Liverpool, he set up Salomón Rondón's goal with a solo run. Before the match, Leko received the club's Young Player of the Season award. On 28 June, he agreed terms on his first professional contract, a three-year deal lasting to June 2019.

He made nine Premier League appearances for West Bromwich Albion in 2016–17. Away to Stoke City on 24 September 2016, he took a corner from which Rondón headed a stoppage-time equaliser. He then won the Premier League 2 Player of the Month award for December with the West Bromwich Albion U23s.

Leko was one of 98 nominations for the European Golden Boy award for 2017, but did not make the 24-man shortlist.

Leko made one substitute appearance for West Brom, in the 2017–18 EFL Cup, before joining Championship club Bristol City on 28 August on a season-long loan. He was recalled in January 2018 after 11 goalless appearances, so that he could by assessed by new manager Alan Pardew.

West Bromwich Albion were relegated to the Championship in 2018, but Leko played little during the 2018–19 season.

==== Charlton Athletic (first loan) ====
On 8 August 2019, Leko and teammate Sam Field joined Charlton Athletic on a season-long loan. He scored his first goal against Reading on 31 August. Having scored five goals from 21 appearances, Leko suffered an ACL injury during the match against Queens Park Rangers on 23 December which ruled him out for the remainder of the season. He returned to his parent club for treatment.

Leko made a complaint to the Football Association about an incident of racial abuse by Leeds United goalkeeper Kiko Casilla in a match in September. Casilla was found guilty by an independent panel in February 2020 and received an eight-match ban and a £60,000 fine. Leko said afterwards that he had been disappointed both by the delay in resolving the issue and by the lack of support from the Professional Footballers' Association (PFA) and from such anti-racism organisations as Kick It Out and Show Racism the Red Card.

=== Birmingham City ===
Leko signed a three-year contract with Birmingham on 28 August 2020. The fee was undisclosed, but reported as £1 million. After ten months out with the ACL injury, he finally made his Birmingham City debut on 17 October, as a substitute in a 1–0 defeat at home to Sheffield Wednesday.

On 31 August 2021, having made 41 competitive appearances without scoring, Leko re-joined League One club Charlton Athletic on a season-long loan. He made his second debut for the club on 11 September, as a half-time substitute with Charlton two goals down at home to Cheltenham Town, and scored after 59 minutes; the match ended 1–2.

Upon his return to Birmingham he scored his first goal for the club in an EFL Cup tie against Norwich City on 9 August 2022.

=== Milton Keynes Dons ===
Leko signed for League One club Milton Keynes Dons on 13 January 2023 for an undisclosed fee. He made his debut on 21 January 2023, providing an assist in a 2–1 away win over Forest Green Rovers. Leko scored his first goal for the club on 18 February 2023, scoring a 25-yard strike in a 5–2 defeat away to Sheffield Wednesday.

Leko joined League One club Burton Albion on 26 January 2024 on loan for the rest of the season. He made his debut the next day as a half-time substitute away to Cambridge United, but lasted just five minutes before having to leave the field due to another ACL injury - the second of his career. The injury ruled Leko out for the remainder of the season.

On 20 June 2025, the club announced the player had signed a new contract. Despite injury issues and limited appearances, Leko achieved the first promotion of his career under head coach Paul Warne at the conclusion of the 2025–26 season, with the club achieving a second-placed finish and return to League One.

He was one of nine players to be released by the club at the conclusion of their contracts on 30 June 2026.

=== Penybont ===
In August 2026 he signed for Cymru Premier club Penybont.

== International career ==
Leko represented England at under-16 level. He was ever-present for the under-17s in qualifying for the 2016 European Championships. Against Turkey in the elite round, he set up the first goal for Reiss Nelson and scored the second in a 3–1 win. However, he was unable to take part in the tournament proper because West Bromwich Albion pulled him out of the squad so that he could play in the final two games of the Premier League season.

Leko received his first call-up to the England under-18 team for friendlies against Italy and Israel in September 2016; he appeared in both games. He made four friendly appearances for the under-19s in 2017, but played no competitive matches at that level.

Leko made his under-20 debut on 5 September 2019, starting in a goalless draw with the Netherlands at the New Meadow, Shrewsbury, and played twice more at that level.

== Career statistics ==
As of 10 March 2026

Appearances and goals by club, season and competition
| Club | Season | League | | | FA Cup | | League Cup | | Other | | Total | |
| Club | Season | Division | Apps | Goals | Apps | Goals | Apps | Goals | Apps | Goals | Apps | Goals |
|---|---|---|---|---|---|---|---|---|---|---|---|---|
| West Bromwich Albion | 2015–16 | Premier League | 5 | 0 | 0 | 0 | 1 | 0 | — | | 6 | 0 |
| West Bromwich Albion | 2016–17 | Premier League | 9 | 0 | 0 | 0 | 0 | 0 | — | | 9 | 0 |
| West Bromwich Albion | 2017–18 | Premier League | 0 | 0 | 0 | 0 | 1 | 0 | — | | 1 | 0 |
| West Bromwich Albion | 2018–19 | Championship | 2 | 0 | 2 | 0 | 2 | 1 | 1 (Note: Appearance in the EFL Championship play-offs) | 0 | 7 | 1 |
| West Bromwich Albion | 2019–20 | Championship | 0 | 0 | — | | — | | — | | 0 | 0 |
| West Bromwich Albion | Total | | 16 | 0 | 2 | 0 | 4 | 1 | 1 | 0 | 23 | 1 |
| Bristol City (loan) | 2017–18 | Championship | 11 | 0 | — | | — | | — | | 11 | 0 |
| West Bromwich Albion U21 | 2018–19 | — | | | — | | — | | 2 (Note: Appearance(s) in the EFL Trophy) | 1 | 2 | 1 |
| Charlton Athletic (loan) | 2019–20 | Championship | 21 | 5 | 0 | 0 | 0 | 0 | — | | 21 | 5 |
| Birmingham City | 2020–21 | Championship | 34 | 0 | 1 | 0 | 0 | 0 | — | | 35 | 0 |
| Birmingham City | 2021–22 | Championship | 4 | 0 | 0 | 0 | 2 | 0 | — | | 6 | 0 |
| Birmingham City | 2022–23 | Championship | 8 | 0 | 0 | 0 | 1 | 1 | — | | 9 | 1 |
| Birmingham City | Total | | 46 | 0 | 1 | 0 | 3 | 1 | — | | 50 | 1 |
| Charlton Athletic (loan) | 2021–22 | League One | 25 | 2 | 2 | 0 | — | | 3 | 1 | 30 | 3 |
| Milton Keynes Dons | 2022–23 | League One | 18 | 4 | — | | — | | — | | 18 | 4 |
| Milton Keynes Dons | 2023–24 | League Two | 23 | 3 | 1 | 0 | 1 | 0 | 3 | 1 | 28 | 4 |
| Milton Keynes Dons | 2024–25 | League Two | 9 | 0 | — | | — | | — | | 9 | 0 |
| Milton Keynes Dons | 2025–26 | League Two | 17 | 0 | 1 | 0 | 1 | 0 | 3 | 0 | 22 | 0 |
| Milton Keynes Dons | Total | | 67 | 7 | 2 | 0 | 2 | 0 | 6 | 1 | 77 | 8 |
| Burton Albion (loan) | 2023–24 | League One | 1 | 0 | — | | — | | — | | 1 | 0 |
| Career total | | | 180 | 12 | 7 | 0 | 9 | 2 | 12 | 3 | 208 | 17 |

== Honours ==
Milton Keynes Dons

- EFL League Two runner-up: 2025–26

Individual

- West Bromwich Albion Young Player of the Season: 2015–16
- Premier League 2 Player of the Month: December 2016
