= Maxime Colin =

French footballer (born 1991)

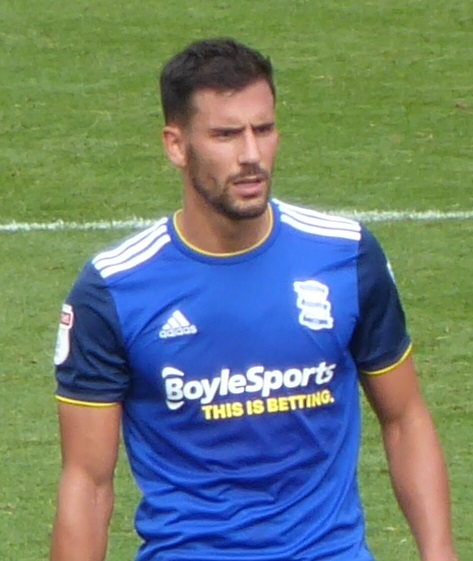
- Colin with Birmingham City in 2019

Personal information
- Full name: Maxime Jean-Yves Colin
- Date of birth: 15 November 1991 (age 34)
- Place of birth: Arras, France
- Height: 1.79 m (5 ft 10 in)
- Position: Full back

Team information
- Current team: Metz
- Number: 2

Youth career
- 1998–2003: Anzin-Saint-Aubin
- 2003–2006: Arras
- 2006–2007: Vermelles
- 2007–2009: Avion
- 2009–2010: Boulogne

Senior career*
Years	Team	Apps	(Gls)
2010–2012	Boulogne	49	(0)
2012–2014	Troyes	55	(0)
2013	Troyes II	2	(0)
2014–2015	Anderlecht	16	(1)
2015–2017	Brentford	62	(4)
2017–2023	Birmingham City	241	(7)
2023–	Metz	60	(0)

International career
2011	France U20	7	(0)
- * Club domestic league appearances and goals as of 20 May 2026

Maxime Jean-Yves Colin (born 15 November 1991) is a French professional footballer who plays as a full back for Ligue 2 club Metz. He previously played for Boulogne, Troyes, Anderlecht, Brentford and Birmingham City. He won seven caps for France at under-20 level.

== Club career ==
=== Boulogne ===
Colin spent his youth career as an amateur with a number of clubs in the Nord-Pas-de-Calais region, most notably Arras and Avion. Having begun his career as a forward, Colin subsequently moved to right back. He was not a member of any club's centre of excellence because his parents prioritised his education. After gaining his baccalauréat, he completed the first year of medical studies with the intention of becoming a physiotherapist. He joined Ligue 1 club Boulogne in 2009, and spent a season with the Division d'Honneur team. Ahead of the 2010–11 season, he trained with the first team – newly relegated to Ligue 2 – and was offered a three-year professional contract. He signed, knowing that he had the right to postpone his studies for up to five years so could always return to college if he did not succeed at football.

He broke into the team in September, and went on to make 26 appearances during the 2010–11 Ligue 2 season, all as a member of the starting eleven. He played in around half the matches the following season as Boulogne suffered another relegation. Colin's 56th and final appearance for the club came in a home defeat to Créteil in the Championnat National on 28 August 2012.

=== Troyes ===
Colin moved back up to Ligue 1 to sign for Troyes on 3 September 2012. He was in and out of the team during the 2012–13 Ligue 1 season, making 24 appearances as they reached the semi-final of the Coupe de France but were relegated to Ligue 2. Colin was an undisputed first choice during 2013–14, making 42 appearances as Troyes finished in mid-table and went out of the Coupe de la Ligue at the semi-final stage. He made three appearances early in the 2014–15 season, which took his total to 69 over two years with the club.

=== Anderlecht ===
Colin signed a three-year contract with Belgian Pro League club Anderlecht on 28 August 2014. He made his debut with a start in a 2–2 draw with Lierse on 13 September and scored the first goal of his senior career on Boxing Day in a 4–0 victory over Westerlo. Colin made his debut in European football on 19 February 2015 in a goalless draw with Dynamo Moscow in the Europa League round of 32, and played in six of Anderlecht's seven matches in the 2014–15 Belgian Cup; he started in the final, which they lost 2–1 to Club Brugge. He made 24 appearances and scored once during the 2014–15 season, helping Anderlecht qualify for the Europa League, and made one final appearance early in the 2015–16 season. He was willing to leave because, with three right backs at the club, the coach could not guarantee him as many matches as he wanted.

=== Brentford ===
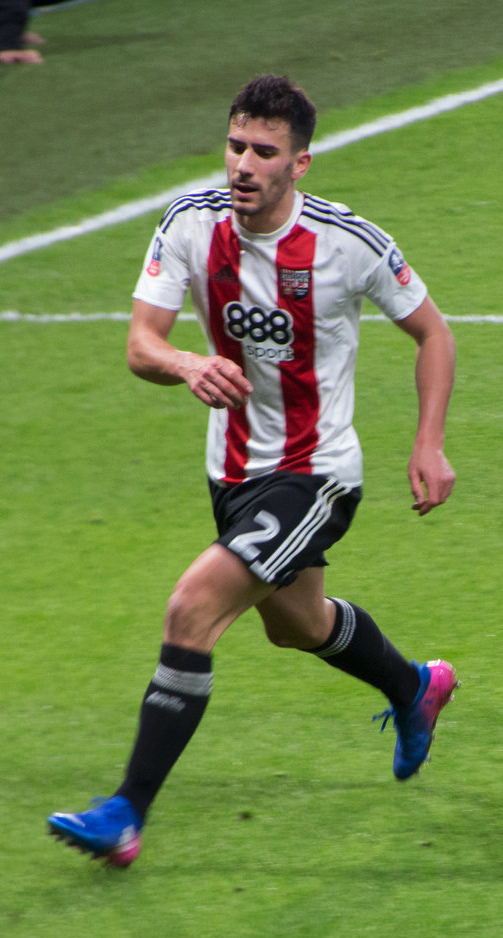
Colin with Brentford in 2017

On 14 August 2015, Colin signed a four-year contract with English Championship club Brentford for an undisclosed fee. He made his debut as a 58th-minute substitute for Akaki Gogia in a 1–0 defeat to Burnley nine days later, and started the next three matches, but a knee ligament injury suffered in training in mid-September ruled him out for three months. He returned with a start in a 4–2 victory over Huddersfield Town. Apart from a four-match absence due to a groin injury suffered in late February 2016, Colin continued as a regular until the end of the season.

Colin returned fully fit for 2016–17 pre-season, but missed the first two matches of the regular season because of a calf injury. He scored his first Bees goal during a 4–1 win over Reading on 27 September and followed with a further three goals during the season. Colin's season came to an end on 22 April 2017, his 40th appearance, when injury forced his substitution after 71 minutes of a 3–1 victory over West London rivals Queens Park Rangers. He began the 2017–18 season behind new signing Henrik Dalsgaard in the right back pecking order and instead deputised for the injured Rico Henry in an unfamiliar left-back position.

=== Birmingham City ===
Colin signed a four-year contract with another Championship club, Birmingham City, on 31 August 2017, becoming the third Brentford player, after Jota and Harlee Dean, to make the same move; the fee was undisclosed. He was one of six debutants in the next match, away to Norwich City; he played the whole match and was yellow-carded in the first half as his team lost 1–0. On his home debut – playing at left back to accommodate Emilio Nsue on the right – Colin controlled a ball over the top "and with his back to goal produced a brilliant turn which saw the whole goal open up. He then lashed a low shot which went through [the goalkeeper] for Blues' first goal in more than six hours of football" to open the scoring against Preston North End, who went on to win 3–1. He missed six matches in November and December because of a torn hamstring, and was otherwise ever-present in league competition. He was used primarily at right back, but switched to the left when Jonathan Grounds was injured to accommodate the right-footed youngster Wes Harding. His second season ran similarly to his first. He was undisputed first choice at right back, spent some time on the left when Kristian Pedersen was injured, and missed three games in March with a hamstring injury: Birmingham lost all three and failed to score.

Colin scored seven goals from 253 appearances in all competitions over six seasons with Birmingham. He was one of six senior professionals released at the end of the 2022–23 season.

=== Metz ===
On 27 July 2023, Colin signed a two-year contract with Metz, newly promoted to Ligue 1 for the 2023–24 season. He began the season in the starting eleven but damaged a calf during his third match and was out for approaching two months. He ended the regular season with 22 league appearances, all as a starter, as Metz finished in 16th place, so faced a relegation/promotion play-off against Ligue 2 club Saint-Étienne. Colin played in both legs, which Metz lost 4–3 on aggregate after extra time.

== International career ==
Colin won seven caps for the France U20 team in 2011. He was named in the squad for the 2011 U20 World Cup and made appearances against Colombia and Mexico as France finished fourth in the tournament.

== Career statistics ==
As of match played 17 May 2026

Appearances and goals by club, season and competition
Club	Season	League			National cup (Note: Includes Coupe de France, Belgian Cup, FA Cup)		League cup (Note: Includes Coupe de la Ligue, Football League Cup/EFL Cup)		Other		Total	
Club	Season	Division	Apps	Goals	Apps	Goals	Apps	Goals	Apps	Goals	Apps	Goals
Boulogne	2010–11	Ligue 2	26	0	2	0	0	0	—		28	0
Boulogne	2011–12	Ligue 2	23	0	0	0	0	0	—		23	0
Boulogne	2012–13	Championnat National	0	0	—		1	0	—		1	0
Boulogne	Total		49	0	2	0	1	0	—		52	0
Troyes	2012–13	Ligue 1	18	0	4	0	2	0	—		24	0
Troyes	2013–14	Ligue 2	35	0	1	0	6	0	—		42	0
Troyes	2014–15	Ligue 2	2	0	—		1	0	—		3	0
Troyes	Total		55	0	5	0	9	0	—		69	0
Troyes II	2012–13	CFA 2	2	0	—		—		—		2	0
Anderlecht	2014–15	Belgian Pro League	15	1	6	0	—		3 (Note: One appearance in UEFA Europa League, two in Belgian Pro League Championship playoffs)	0	24	1
Anderlecht	2015–16	Belgian Pro League	1	0	—		—		—		1	0
Anderlecht	Total		16	1	6	0	—		3	0	25	1
Brentford	2015–16	Championship	21	0	0	0	—		—		21	0
Brentford	2016–17	Championship	38	4	2	0	0	0	—		40	4
Brentford	2017–18	Championship	3	0	0	0	2	0	—		5	0
Brentford	Total		62	4	2	0	2	0	—		66	4
Birmingham City	2017–18	Championship	35	2	1	0	—		—		36	2
Birmingham City	2018–19	Championship	43	0	1	0	0	0	—		44	0
Birmingham City	2019–20	Championship	44	1	3	0	0	0	—		47	1
Birmingham City	2020–21	Championship	42	1	1	0	1	0	—		44	1
Birmingham City	2021–22	Championship	33	1	1	0	0	0	—		34	1
Birmingham City	2022–23	Championship	44	2	3	0	1	0	—		48	2
Birmingham City	Total		241	7	10	0	2	0	—		253	7
Metz	2023–24	Ligue 1	22	0	1	0	—		2 (Note: Appearances in Ligue 1 relegation/promotion play-offs)	0	25	0
Metz	2024–25	Ligue 2	16	0	1	0	—		1	0	18	0
Metz	2025–26	Ligue 1	22	0	1	0	—		—		23	0
Metz	Total		60	0	3	0	—		3	0	66	0
Career total			485	12	28	0	14	0	6	0	533	12
