= Amari Miller =

English footballer (born 2002)

Personal information
- Full name: Amari Miquel Miller
- Date of birth: 4 November 2002 (age 23)
- Place of birth: Birmingham, England
- Position: Winger

Youth career
- –2020: Birmingham City

Senior career*
Years	Team	Apps	(Gls)
2020–2021	Birmingham City	5	(0)
2021–2025	Leeds United	0	(0)
- * Club domestic league appearances and goals as of 06:49, 19 May 2025 (UTC)

Amari Miquel Miller (born 4 November 2002) is an English professional footballer who plays as a winger. A product of Birmingham City's academy, he is currently unattached having been released by Leeds United in May 2025 at the end of his contract.

== Life and career ==
=== Early life and career ===
Miller was born in Birmingham, where he attended SS Mary and John Primary School and St Edmund Campion Catholic School in the Erdington district. He took up a two-year scholarship with Birmingham City F.C. in July 2019. According to the then academy manager Kristjaan Speakman, Miller "progressed through the Academy as a wide player who can also play in central attacking positions. He is a creative player, able to stay on the ball and dribble with speed and changes of direction. He is an attacking player who is exciting to watch and one the players enjoy playing with due to his flair in possession."

=== Birmingham City ===
He played in all four of Birmingham's pre-season friendlies ahead of the 2020–21 season; in the last, he "tucked home a superb cross-field cross from Odin Bailey" for the second goal in a 3–0 win at home to Walsall. Miller continued his development in the club's junior teams before making his first appearance in a senior matchday squad on 10 April 2021. With Scott Hogan and Jon Toral injured, new manager Lee Bowyer named Miller among the substitutes for the Championship match at home to Stoke City. He came on in stoppage time to replace Lukas Jutkiewicz with his side 2–0 ahead to make his Football League debut, and made two more appearances from the bench. After Birmingham avoided relegation, Bowyer used the two remaining matches as an opportunity to look at his fringe players, and Miller started in both. In May 2021, Birmingham confirmed that Miller was one of five second-year scholars to be offered a professional contract.

=== Leeds United ===
Amid reported interest from Premier League clubs including Everton, Southampton and Tottenham Hotspur, Miller signed a four-year contract with Leeds United on 28 June 2021. The fee was undisclosed. He played for Leeds U23 in Premier League 2, and on 14 September, made his EFL Trophy debut for Leeds U21 away to Tranmere Rovers, who led 3–0 at half-time. Miller made the score 3–1 after 63 minutes with a confident finish from Archie Gray's through ball, but Tranmere won 4–1. Miller was released by Leeds at the end of the 2024–25 season.

== Career statistics ==
As of match played 4 October 2022

Appearances and goals by club, season and competition
Club	Season	League			FA Cup		EFL Cup		Other		Total	
Club	Season	Division	Apps	Goals	Apps	Goals	Apps	Goals	Apps	Goals	Apps	Goals
Birmingham City	2020–21	Championship	5	0	0	0	0	0	—		5	0
Leeds United	2021–22	Premier League	0	0	0	0	0	0	—		0	0
Leeds United	2022–23	Premier League	0	0	0	0	0	0	—		0	0
Leeds United	Total		0	0	0	0	0	0	0	0	0	0
Leeds United U21	2021–22	—			—		—		3 (Note: Appearance(s) in EFL Trophy)	1	3	1
Leeds United U21	2022–23	—			—		—		1	0	1	0
Leeds United U21	Total		0	0	0	0	0	0	4	1	4	1
Career total			5	0	0	0	0	0	4	1	9	1
