= Adan George =

English footballer (born 2002)

Personal information
- Full name: Kai Adan George
- Date of birth: 30 July 2002 (age 24)
- Place of birth: Birmingham, England
- Position: Forward

Team information
- Current team: AFC Telford United

Youth career
- West Bromwich Albion
- 2015–2018: Birmingham City

Senior career*
Years	Team	Apps	(Gls)
2018–2023	Birmingham City	1	(0)
2018	→ Bromsgrove Sporting (loan)	1	(0)
2020–2021	→ Walsall (loan)	0	(0)
2023	Alvechurch	14	(5)
2023–2024	Rushall Olympic	7	(3)
2024–2025	FC Halifax Town	34	(3)
2025–	AFC Telford United	22	(6)
- * Club domestic league appearances and goals as of 20:23, 30 January 2026 (UTC)

Kai Adan George (born 30 July 2002) is an English footballer who plays as a forward for National League North club AFC Telford United.

George began his football career with West Bromwich Albion before joining Birmingham City's academy in 2015. He made his senior debut while on loan to Bromsgrove Sporting of the Southern League Division One Central in 2018–19, first played for Birmingham at the beginning of the 2020–21 season, and then spent time on loan at League Two club Walsall without making a first-team appearance. After injury disrupted his progress, George was released by Birmingham at the end of the 2022–23 season. He spent three months with Southern League Alvechurch before moving up a level to Rushall Olympic, and joined FC Halifax Town in January 2024.

== Early life and youth career ==
George was born in Birmingham, where he attended Handsworth Grammar School. He was a member of West Bromwich Albion's academy before joining Birmingham City's in 2015. He took up a scholarship with the club in July 2018. According to coach Steve Spooner, he "is very quick, very powerful and needs to recognise that is his strength. It's about using his strengths and imposing himself on the opponents. But he is capable of scoring goals. He is very direct. He has to work on the technical side of the game, like a lot of the boys." The player agreed that his pace and power were his best qualities, and felt he needed to improve his composure and dribbling.

He was one of a number of Birmingham youth players who spent a few weeks on loan at non-league clubs in late 2018. He joined Bromsgrove Sporting of the Southern League Division One Central, and made one senior appearance, as a second-half substitute in a 3–0 defeat away to Coleshill Town on 1 January 2019, before returning to his parent club. Although his season was interrupted by injury, he scored eight goals from five matches for Birmingham's under-18s, and played for their under-23 team that reached the final of its division, in which they finished as runners-up in the 2018–19 Professional Development League Northern Section but lost out to Leeds United on penalties for the overall title. His performances attracted attention from Premier League clubs, and his goalscoring in Birmingham's 2019–20 FA Youth Cup run, combined with his not having signed a professional contract, meant interest heightened. By April 2020, when the club made him an offer of professional terms, Spooner described him as having "a physique like a middleweight boxer and you get him running in the channels against you, when he uses his strength as well as his pace, then he causes a problem."

== Club career ==
In July 2020, George signed a two-year contract with Birmingham City, with an option for a third year. He made his first-team debut in the opening match of Birmingham's 2020–21 season, playing the whole of the 1–0 defeat at home to Cambridge United in the EFL Cup. The Birmingham Mail thought he "showed some impressive hold up play and strength with his back to goal but didn't have much joy when he got turned" in what was a promising debut. He made his first appearance in the Football League a week later, as a second-half substitute in the opening match of the Championship season.

That was his last appearance before joining League Two club Walsall on 16 October on loan until 3 January 2021. He was among the substitutes for two league and two cup matches, but remained unused. George spent the rest of the season with Birmingham's under-23 team, again helping them achieve runners-up spot in the Professional Development League Northern Section and going on to score both goals in a 2–0 win against Sheffield United U23 to secure the overall title.

George tore his ACL during pre-season, had surgery in September 2021, and missed the entire season as a result. With his contract due to expire, the club offered him a 12-month deal with the option of another year, which he signed. He made no more first-team appearances, the club decided not to take up their option, and George was one of 13 professionals released at the end of the 2022–23 season.

George signed for Southern League Premier Central Division (seventh-tier) club Alvechurch in August 2023. He scored five goals from 14 league matches before, on 14 November 2023, moving up a level to National League North club Rushall Olympic. After three goals from 7 league matches, he moved up another level on 11 January 2024, signing for National League club FC Halifax Town.

== Career statistics ==
As of match played 14 January 2025

Appearances and goals by club, season and competition
Club	Season	League			FA Cup		EFL Cup		Other		Total	
Club	Season	Division	Apps	Goals	Apps	Goals	Apps	Goals	Apps	Goals	Apps	Goals
Birmingham City	2018–19	Championship	0	0	0	0	0	0	—		0	0
Birmingham City	2019–20	Championship	0	0	0	0	0	0	—		0	0
Birmingham City	2020–21	Championship	1	0	0	0	1	0	—		2	0
Birmingham City	2021–22	Championship	0	0	0	0	0	0	—		0	0
Birmingham City	2022–23	Championship	0	0	0	0	0	0	—		0	0
Birmingham City	Total		1	0	0	0	1	0	—		2	0
Bromsgrove Sporting (loan)	2018–19	Southern League Div. One Central	1	0	—		—		—		1	0
Walsall (loan)	2020–21	League Two	0	0	0	0	—		0	0	0	0
Alvechurch	2023–24	Southern League Prem. Div. Central	14	5	2	0	—		2 (Note: Appearances in FA Trophy)	0	18	5
Rushall Olympic	2023–24	National League North	7	3	—		—		—		7	3
FC Halifax Town	2023–24	National League	15	3	—		—		1 (Note: Appearance in National League play-offs)	0	16	3
FC Halifax Town	2024–25	National League	19	0	1	0	—		3 (Note: Appearances in National League Cup)	0	23	0
FC Halifax Town	Total		34	3	1	0	—		4	0	39	3
Career total			57	11	3	0	1	0	6	0	67	11
