= 2022–23 Birmingham City F.C. season =

Birmingham City
2022–23 season
- Owner: Birmingham Sports Holdings 75.00%; Oriental Rainbow 21.64%
- Head coach: Lee Bowyer (until 2 July); John Eustace (from 3 July)
- Stadium: St Andrew's
- Championship: 17th
- FA Cup: Fourth round
- EFL Cup: First round
- Top goalscorer: League: Scott Hogan (10); All: Scott Hogan (10)
- Highest home attendance: 19,007 (vs Queens Park Rangers, 28 October 2022)
- Lowest home attendance: 7,183 (vs Blackburn Rovers, 31 January 2023)
Home colours	Away colours

The 2022–23 season was Birmingham City Football Club's 120th season in the English football league system and 12th consecutive season in the second-tier Championship. As with all English Football League clubs, the first team competed in the FA Cup, from which they were eliminated by Blackburn Rovers in the fourth round, and the EFL Cup, in which they lost to Norwich City in the first. They secured their Championship status for a further season following a 1–0 win at Millwall with three matches left to play, and finished in 17th place.

The season covers the period from 1 July 2022 to 30 June 2023.

== Background and pre-season ==
On 2 July 2022, amid rumours of an imminent takeover of the club, head coach Lee Bowyer was sacked, to be replaced the following day by John Eustace.

The club planned a pre-season training camp in Portugal, to include a friendly match against Primeira Liga club Portimonense, and domestic friendlies away to League One clubs Burton Albion and Cheltenham Town, and at home to Rayo Vallecano. On the same date as the Cheltenham match, a Birmingham team faced Solihull Moors for the inaugural Arthur Cup, a match in aid of children's charities in memory of Arthur Labinjo-Hughes.

Pre-season friendly match details
Date	Opponents	Venue	Result	Score F–A	Scorers	Attendance	Refs
5 July 2022	Walsall	H	W	1–0	Hogan	0 (behind closed doors)	
12 July 2022	Portimonense	N	D	1–1	Hogan 33'		
16 July 2022	Burton Albion	A	W	2–1	Hall 37', Cosgrove 87'	2,588	
19 July 2022	Cheltenham Town	A	L	0–1		1,429	
19 July 2022	Solihull Moors	A	L	0–1			
23 July 2022	Rayo Vallecano	H	D	2–2	Płacheta 15', Bacuna 53'	2,542	

== EFL Championship ==
Birmingham opened their season with a goalless draw away to Luton Town. There were four debutants: John Ruddy in goal and three loanees, Dion Sanderson, in his second loan spell with the club, and Auston Trusty in central defence, and Przemysław Płacheta at wing-back. The three-man back line was completed by Marc Roberts and Maxime Colin was the other wing-back. Ryan Woods, Jordan James, and Juninho Bacuna formed the midfield, and the forwards were Scott Hogan and captain Troy Deeney. According to the Birmingham Mail's assessment, Ruddy's "commanding presence" and a well-organised defence prevented the hosts taking advantage of their greater number of chances; Luton manager Nathan Jones complained about Birmingham's time-wasting tactics.

=== League table ===
Pos	Team	Pld	W	D	L	GF	GA	GD	Pts
14	Bristol City	46	15	14	17	55	56	−1	59
15	Hull City	46	14	16	16	51	61	−10	58
16	Stoke City	46	14	11	21	55	54	+1	53
17	Birmingham City	46	14	11	21	47	58	−11	53
18	Huddersfield Town	46	14	11	21	47	62	−15	53
19	Rotherham United	46	11	17	18	49	60	−11	50
20	Queens Park Rangers	46	13	11	22	44	71	−27	50

Rules for classification: 1) Points; 2) Goal difference; 3) Number of goals scored; 4) Head-to-head results; 5) Wins; 6) Away goals; 7) Penalty points (sec 9.5); 8) 12-point sending off offences

=== Results summary ===
Overall								Home						Away					
Pld	W	D	L	GF	GA	GD	Pts	W	D	L	GF	GA	GD	W	D	L	GF	GA	GD
46	14	11	21	47	58	−11	53	7	6	10	24	24	0	7	5	11	23	34	−11

=== Match results ===
EFL Championship match details
Date	League position	Opponents	Venue	Result	Score F–A	Scorers	Attendance	Refs
30 July 2022	11th	Luton Town	A	D	0–0		9,921	
5 August 2022	1st	Huddersfield Town	H	W	2–1	Hogan 5', Płacheta 45'	17,065	
13 August 2022	11th	Cardiff City	A	L	0–1		18,893	
16 August 2022	11th	Watford	H	D	1–1	Hall 19'	16,811	
20 August 2022	18th	Wigan Athletic	H	L	0–1		16,013	
27 August 2022	21st	Rotherham United	A	L	0–2		11,027	
30 August 2022	21st	Norwich City	H	L	1–2	Hogan 50'	16,156	
3 September 2022	20th	Preston North End	A	W	1–0	Colin 16'	16,098	
14 September 2022	14th	West Bromwich Albion	A	W	3–2	Hogan (3) 14', 54', 71'	23,089	
17 September 2022	17th	Coventry City	H	D	0–0		16,633	
1 October 2022	15th	Sheffield United	A	D	1–1	Deeney 70'	29,927	
5 October 2022	19th	Middlesbrough	A	L	0–1		22,374	
8 October 2022	14th	Bristol City	H	W	3–0	Trusty (2) 3', 43', Sanderson 75'	16,807	
16 October 2022	12th	Hull City	A	W	2–0	Deeney 14' (pen.), Bacuna 47'	16,587	
19 October 2022	14th	Burnley	H	D	1–1	Hogan 80'	16,303	
22 October 2022	14th	Blackburn Rovers	A	L	1–2	Hogan 80'	14,092	
28 October 2022	11th	Queens Park Rangers	H	W	2–0	Trusty 4', Longelo 29'	19,007	
2 November 2022	13th	Millwall	H	D	0–0		15,030	
5 November 2022	11th	Stoke City	A	W	2–1	Hogan 13', Dean 67'	22,459	
8 November 2022	10th	Swansea City	H	D	2–2	Hogan 12', Deeney 89'	15,491	
11 November 2022	10th	Sunderland	H	L	1–2	Jutkiewicz 78'	18,702	
10 December 2022	14th	Blackpool	A	D	0–0		12,853	
16 December 2022	7th	Reading	H	W	3–2	Deeney (2) 2', 23' (pen.), Chong 36'	14,647	
27 December 2022	15th	Burnley	A	L	0–3		20,945	
30 December 2022	16th	Hull City	H	L	0–1		17,868	
2 January 2023	17th	Middlesbrough	H	L	1–3	Chong 74'	17,823	
14 January 2023	18th	Bristol City	A	L	2–4	Deeney 34' (pen.), Khadra 76'	21,489	
21 January 2023	19th	Preston North End	H	L	1–2	Jutkiewicz 83'	16,608	
4 February 2023	18th	Swansea City	A	W	4–3	Hogan 14' (pen.), Chong 55', Jutkiewicz 90, Trusty 90+7'	17,247	
10 February 2023	16th	West Bromwich Albion	H	W	2–0	Mejbri 10', Bielik 52'	17,781	
14 February 2023	18th	Cardiff City	H	L	0–2		14,369	
18 February 2023	18th	Huddersfield Town	A	L	1–2	Deeney 6'	19,564	
21 February 2023	19th	Norwich City	A	L	1–3	Colin 53'	25,657	
25 February 2023	19th	Luton Town	H	L	0–1		16,866	
4 March 2023	19th	Wigan Athletic	A	D	1–1	Bacuna 4'	13,741	
11 March 2023	18th	Rotherham United	H	W	2–0	Khadra 5', Long 35'	15,932	
14 March 2023	18th	Watford	A	L	0–3		18,403	
18 March 2023	16th	Queens Park Rangers	A	W	1–0	Chong 3'	15,097	
1 April 2023	16th	Blackburn Rovers	H	W	1–0	Khadra 61'	16,623	
7 April 2023	16th	Reading	A	D	1–1	Jutkiewicz 29'	16,084	
10 April 2023	17th	Stoke City	H	D	0–0		17,413	
15 April 2023	17th	Sunderland	A	L	1–2	Hall 29'	37,673	
18 April 2023	15th	Millwall	A	W	1–0	Jutkiewicz 28'	13,311	
22 April 2023	17th	Blackpool	H	L	0–1		16,636	
29 April 2023	17th	Coventry City	A	L	0–2		30,175	
8 May 2023	17th	Sheffield United	H	L	1–2	Sanderson 79'	18,853	

== FA Cup ==
As with all teams in the top two divisions, Birmingham entered the competition in the third round, in which they were drawn away to League One club Forest Green Rovers.

FA Cup match details
Round	Date	Opponents	Venue	Result	Score F–A	Scorers	Attendance	Refs
Third round	17 January 2023	Forest Green Rovers	A	W	2–1	Jutkiewicz 50', Long 65'	3,701	
Fourth round	28 January 2023	Blackburn Rovers	A	D	2–2	Khadra 3', James 90+1'	13,687	
Fourth round replay	31 January 2023	Blackburn Rovers	H	L	0–1 a.e.t.		7,183	

== EFL Cup ==
Birmingham made seven changes from their previous starting eleven for the first-round visit to fellow Championship club Norwich City; the three-man central midfield comprised Jordan James, a first-team regular at just 18, Alfie Chang (19), and Jobe Bellingham, the 16-year-old brother of England international Jude. Norwich took a two-goal lead in first-half stoppage time, but Jonathan Leko's first goal for the club and an own goal following a corner kick brought the scores level, so the tie was determined on penalties. Sam Cosgrove and Leko missed their kicks, but Norwich missed only one of their first four, so went through to the next round.

EFL Cup match details
Round	Date	Opponents	Venue	Result	Score F–A	Scorers	Attendance	Refs
First round	9 August 2022	Norwich City	A	D	2–2 (2–4 pens.)	Leko 53', Tomkinson 77' o.g.	18,971	

== Transfers ==
=== In ===
Date	Player	Club †	Fee	Refs
1 July 2022	Finley Thorndike	(Aston Villa)	Out of contract	
14 July 2022	John Ruddy	(Wolverhampton Wanderers)	Out of contract	
1 September 2022	Tahith Chong	Manchester United	Undisclosed	
12 October 2022	Lewis Cunningham *	(York City)	Out of contract	
5 January 2023	Kevin Long	Burnley	Undisclosed	
31 January 2023	Emmanuel Longelo	West Ham United	Undisclosed	

† Brackets round a club's name indicate the player's contract with that club had expired before he joined Birmingham.
* Signed primarily for the development squad

==== Loaned in ====
Date	Player	Club	Return	Refs
5 July 2022	Dion Sanderson	Wolverhampton Wanderers	End of season	
6 July 2022	Przemysław Płacheta	Norwich City	Terminated 3 January 2023	
15 July 2022	Auston Trusty	Arsenal	End of season	
29 July 2022	Krystian Bielik	Derby County	End of season	
29 August 2022	Hannibal Mejbri	Manchester United	End of season	
30 August 2022	Emmanuel Longelo	West Ham United	Signed permanently 31 January 2023	
10 January 2023	Reda Khadra	Brighton & Hove Albion	End of season	

=== Out ===
Date	Player	Club †	Fee	Refs
22 July 2022	Kyle Hurst	Doncaster Rovers	Free	
18 August 2022	Ryan Woods	Hull City	Undisclosed	
1 September 2022	Odin Bailey	Salford City	Undisclosed	
13 January 2023	Jonathan Leko	Milton Keynes Dons	Undisclosed	
30 June 2023	Alfie Brooks	(Stoke City)	Released	
30 June 2023	Maxime Colin	(FC Metz)	Released	
30 June 2023	Lewis Cunningham	(Mickleover)	Released	
30 June 2023	Harlee Dean	(Reading)	Released	
30 June 2023	Troy Deeney	(Forest Green)	Released	
30 June 2023	George Friend	(Bristol Rovers)	Released	
30 June 2023	Adan George	(Alvechurch)	Released	
30 June 2023	Jordan Graham	(Leyton Orient)	Released	
30 June 2023	Mitchell Roberts	(Oxford City)	Released	
30 June 2023	Keyendrah Simmonds	(Vukovar 1991)	Released	
30 June 2023	Ryan Stirk	(Walsall)	Released	
30 June 2023	Remi Walker	(AFC Telford United)	Released	

- † Brackets round a club's name denote the player joined that club after his Birmingham City contract expired.

==== Loaned out ====
Date	Player	Club	Return	Refs
5 July 2022	Ivan Šunjić	Hertha BSC	End of season	
8 July 2022	Josh Andrews	Doncaster Rovers	January 2023	
25 August 2022	Mitchell Roberts	Oldham Athletic	1 January 2023	
1 September 2022	Sam Cosgrove	Plymouth Argyle	End of season	
1 September 2022	Marcel Oakley	Arbroath	7 January 2023	
1 September 2022	Keyendrah Simmonds	Grimsby Town	14 January 2023	
25 August 2022	Mitchell Roberts	Solihull Moors	End of season	
1 February 2023	Marcel Oakley	Queen's Park	End of season	
3 February 2023	Oliver Basey	Barwell	Youth loan	
7 February 2023	Remi Walker	Alvechurch	Youth loan	
10 February 2023	Callum Sullivan	Bath City	10 March 2023	
16 February 2023	Ryan Stirk	Bromley	End of season	
16 March 2023	Oliver Basey	Hednesford Town	End of season	
17 March 2023	Finley Thorndike	Boston United	End of season	

== Appearances and goals ==
Numbers in parentheses denote appearances made as a substitute.
Players marked † left the club during the playing season.
Players with names in italics and marked * were on loan from another club for the whole of their season with Birmingham.
Players listed with no appearances have been in the matchday squad but only as unused substitutes.
Key to positions: GK – Goalkeeper; DF – Defender; MF – Midfielder; FW – Forward

Players' appearances and goals by competition
No.	Pos.	Nat.	Name	League		FA Cup		EFL Cup		Total		Discipline	
No.	Pos.	Nat.	Name	Apps	Goals	Apps	Goals	Apps	Goals	Apps	Goals	A yellow rectangle, denoting the yellow penalty card shown to a player being cautioned	A red rectangle, denoting the red penalty card shown to a player being sent off
1	GK	PHI	Neil Etheridge	3 (1)	0	3	0	1	0	7 (1)	0	0	0
2	DF	FRA	Maxime Colin	44	2	2 (1)	0	1	0	47	2	5	0
3	DF	ENG	George Friend	2 (4)	0	1	0	0	0	3 (4)	0	0	0
4	DF	ENG	Marc Roberts	20 (5)	0	0	0	1	0	21 (5)	0	4	0
5	DF	USA	Auston Trusty *	44	4	3	0	1	0	48	4	8	0
6	MF	ENG	Ryan Woods †	2	0	0	0	0	0	2	0	1	0
6	MF	TUN	Hannibal Mejbri *	21 (17)	1	2 (1)	0	0	0	23 (18)	1	11	0
7	MF	CUR	Juninho Bacuna	33 (10)	2	1 (2)	0	0	0	34 (12)	2	11	0
8	FW	ENG	Troy Deeney	24 (9)	7	0 (1)	0	0	0	24 (10)	7	5	0
9	FW	IRL	Scott Hogan	30 (7)	10	2 (1)	0	0	0	32 (8)	10	3	0
10	FW	ENG	Lukas Jutkiewicz	19 (25)	5	1 (1)	1	1	0	21 (26)	6	3	0
11	MF	ENG	Jordan Graham	12 (13)	0	1 (1)	0	1	0	14 (14)	0	0	0
12	DF	ENG	Harlee Dean	14 (2)	1	0	0	0	0	14 (2)	1	3	0
14	FW	ENG	Jonathan Leko †	0 (8)	0	0	0	1	1	1 (8)	1	0	0
16	FW	ENG	Sam Cosgrove	0 (2)	0	0	0	0 (1)	0	0 (3)	0	0	0
17	MF	POL	Przemysław Płacheta * †	5	1	0	0	0	0	5	1	0	0
17	MF	GER	Reda Khadra *	12 (2)	3	2	1	0	0	14 (2)	4	0	0
18	MF	NED	Tahith Chong	35 (3)	4	1 (2)	0	0	0	36 (5)	4	6	0
19	MF	WAL	Jordan James	9 (24)	0	1 (2)	1	1	0	11 (26)	1	3	0
20	MF	ENG	Gary Gardner	3 (5)	0	1 (1)	0	0	0	4 (6)	0	0	0
21	GK	ENG	John Ruddy	43	0	0	0	0	0	43	0	2	0
23	DF	ENG	Manny Longelo	18 (5)	1	2	0	0	0	20 (5)	1	4	0
25	DF	ENG	Nico Gordon	0	0	0	0	0	0	0	0	0	0
26	DF	IRL	Kevin Long	17	1	3	1	0	0	20	2	5	0
27	MF	ENG	Jobe Bellingham	5 (17)	0	0	0	1	0	6 (17)	0	1	0
28	DF	ENG	Dion Sanderson *	31	2	3	0	0	0	34	2	9	0
30	MF	ENG	Tate Campbell	0 (1)	0	0	0	0 (1)	0	0 (2)	0	0	0
31	MF	POL	Krystian Bielik *	35	1	2	0	0	0	37	1	13	0
35	MF	ENG	George Hall	13 (17)	2	0	0	0	0	13 (17)	2	0	0
38	GK	ENG	Zach Jeacock	0	0	0	0	0	0	0	0	0	0
42	MF	ENG	Alfie Chang	7 (6)	0	1 (2)	0	1	0	9 (8)	0	1	0
47	MF	WAL	Ryan Stirk	0 (1)	0	0	0	0 (1)	0	0 (2)	0	0	0
48	MF	ENG	Josh Williams	6 (1)	0	0	0	1	0	7 (1)	0	1	0
49	MF	ENG	Romelle Donovan	0	0	0	0	0	0	0	0	0	0
50	FW	ENG	Trevan Sanusi	0	0	0	0	0	0	0	0	0	0

Players not included in matchday squads
No.	Pos.	Nat.	Name
32	DF	ENG	Marcel Oakley
33	MF	ENG	Finley Thorndike
37	MF	ENG	Odin Bailey †
40	FW	ENG	Adan George
41	MF	ENG	Remi Walker
43	DF	ENG	Mitchell Roberts
45	FW	ENG	Keyendrah Simmonds
46	MF	ENG	Brandon Khela
