= Jayden Reid (English footballer) =

English footballer (born 2001)

Personal information
- Full name: Jayden Andrew Reid
- Date of birth: 22 April 2001 (age 25)
- Place of birth: Luton, England
- Height: 6 ft 0 in (1.82 m)
- Positions: Winger; forward

Team information
- Current team: Istogu

Youth career
- 20??–2017: Manchester United
- 2017–2019: Swansea City

Senior career*
Years	Team	Apps	(Gls)
2019–2021	Birmingham City	4	(0)
2020–2021	→ Barrow (loan)	10	(0)
2021	→ Walsall (loan)	1	(0)
2021–2023	Portsmouth	0	(0)
2024–2025	IFK Mariehamn	33	(1)
2026–	Istogu	0	(0)
- * Club domestic league appearances and goals as of 17 July 2026

Jayden Andrew Reid (born 22 April 2001) is an English professional footballer who plays as a winger or forward for Kosovo First League club Istogu.

Reid came through the youth systems of Manchester United and Swansea City before turning professional with Birmingham City in 2019. He made his Football League debut towards the end of the 2019–20 EFL Championship season, and spent time on loan to Barrow and Walsall in 2020–21. Birmingham released him in 2021 and he signed for Portsmouth, where injury prevented him from playing. He joined IFK Mariehamn in 2024.

== Early career ==
Reid was born in 2001 in Luton, Bedfordshire. His older brother Tyler also became a professional footballer. Tyler joined Manchester United's Academy in 2012, and Jayden followed him. After Tyler signed for Swansea City, Jayden again followed him, and took up a two-year scholarship with the club. He played on the wing or as an attacking midfielder for the under-18 team and occasionally for the under-23s, but was not offered a professional contract when his scholarship came to an end.

== Club career ==
A trial with West Ham United came to nothing, but trials with Championship club Birmingham City at the end of the 2018–19 season led to a one-year professional contract, with an option of a second year. Birmingham's then academy manager, Kristjaan Speakman, saw him as "a forward player best suited to central areas [who] has demonstrated good ability in and around the box." Once recovered from an ankle injury that interrupted his progress, he scored freely for Birmingham's under-23 team and was given a first-team squad number in February 2020. The club took their one-year option on his contract, and when the 2019–20 EFL Championship season resumed after its suspension because of the COVID-19 pandemic, he was named among nine substitutes for Birmingham's first match under the temporary rules, on 20 June away at West Bromwich Albion, but remained unused. He made his senior debut on 8 July, at home to his former club Swansea City, replacing Jérémie Bela after 77 minutes with his team 3–1 down, which was the final score. He finished the season with four appearances, all from the bench.

Reid had no involvement in Birmingham's matchday squad under new head coach Aitor Karanka, who thought he would benefit from greater experience of competitive football, so on 16 October 2020, he joined League Two club Barrow on loan until 3 January 2021. He made his debut four days later, replacing the injured Scott Quigley ten minutes into the second half with his team 3–2 up at home to Bolton Wanderers; the visitors equalised in the 95th minute. He made 12 appearances in all competitions, mainly as a substitute, before returning to Birmingham when his loan expired.

He joined another League Two club, Walsall, on 19 January 2021 on loan for the remainder of the season. He was a regular on the bench, but made only one appearance, playing the first half of the visit to Exeter City on 2 March, before returning to Birmingham by mutual consent later that month. Walsall's manager, Brian Dutton, said that Reid was "frustrated that he'd not had enough minutes and he felt that he would stand a better chance of earning a contract somewhere else next season, whether that's with Birmingham or another club." In May 2021, Birmingham confirmed that Reid would leave the club when his contract expired at the end of the season. His last appearance was for Birmingham's U23 team as they beat Sheffield United U23 in the national final of the 2020–21 Professional Development League.

After a trial, Reid signed a one-year deal with League One club Portsmouth on 20 July 2021. A few minutes into his first pre-season friendly, he suffered a ruptured cruciate ligament that would keep him out for the season. The club took up their option to extend his contract for a further year. He regained fitness only to injure a hamstring during 2022 pre-season, suffered a second ACL rupture, to the other knee, during training in October, and was released at the end of the 2022–23 season without having played any competitive football for the club.

Reid signed a two-year contract with Finnish Veikkausliiga club IFK Mariehamn in January 2024. After having recovered from an injury, Reid debuted in the league on 26 May 2024, in a 1–1 draw against Gnistan.

In July 2026, Reid joined Kosovo First League club Istogu.

== Career statistics ==
As of 1 June 2025

Appearances and goals by club, season and competition
Club	Season	League			National cup (Note: Includes FA Cup and Suomen Cup)		League cup (Note: Includes EFL Cup and Finnish League Cup)		Other		Total	
Club	Season	Division	Apps	Goals	Apps	Goals	Apps	Goals	Apps	Goals	Apps	Goals
Birmingham City	2019–20	Championship	4	0	0	0	0	0	—		4	0
Birmingham City	2020–21	Championship	0	0	0	0	0	0	—		0	0
Birmingham City	Total		4	0	0	0	0	0	—		4	0
Barrow (loan)	2020–21	League Two	10	0	1	0	—		1 (Note: Appearance in EFL Trophy)	0	12	0
Walsall (loan)	2020–21	League Two	1	0	—		—		—		1	0
Portsmouth	2021–22	League One	0	0	0	0	0	0	0	0	0	0
Portsmouth	2022–23	League One	0	0	0	0	0	0	0	0	0	0
Portsmouth	Total		0	0	0	0	0	0	0	0	0	0
IFK Mariehamn	2024	Veikkausliiga	16	0	1	0	5	1	—		22	1
IFK Mariehamn	2025	Veikkausliiga	2	1	0	0	4	0	–		6	1
IFK Mariehamn	Total		18	1	1	0	9	1	0	0	28	2
Career total			33	1	2	0	9	1	1	0	45	2
