= Jérémie Bela =

Angolan-French footballer (born 1993)

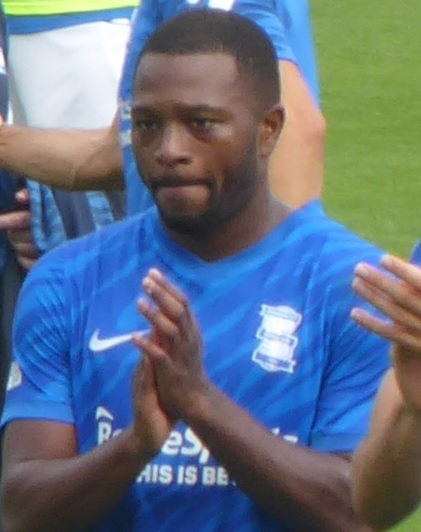
- Bela with Birmingham City in 2021

Personal information
- Full name: Jérémie Bela
- Date of birth: 8 April 1993 (age 33)
- Place of birth: Melun, Seine-et-Marne, France
- Height: 1.73 m (5 ft 8 in)
- Positions: Forward; winger

Youth career
- 1999–2001: AS Herblay
- 2003–2007: Ville d'Évry
- 2006–2009: INF Clairefontaine
- 2007–2008: Viry-Châtillon
- 2009–2010: Lens

Senior career*
Years	Team	Apps	(Gls)
2010–2014	Lens B	54	(14)
2012–2014	Lens	17	(1)
2014–2017	Dijon	74	(10)
2014–2017	Dijon B	9	(7)
2017–2019	Albacete	67	(16)
2019–2022	Birmingham City	96	(7)
2022–2024	Clermont	31	(1)
2024–2025	Omonia 29M	23	(3)

International career^{‡}
2008	France U16	2	(1)
2021–	Angola	6	(0)
- * Club domestic league appearances and goals as of 14:44, 12 May 2025 (UTC) ‡ National team caps and goals as of 17:09, 19 November 2024 (UTC)

Jérémie Bela (born 8 April 1993) is a professional footballer who plays as a winger or forward for the Angola national team. He has played for Lens, Dijon, Albacete, Birmingham City and Clermont. He represented his native France at under-16 level, and was called up for the senior teams of both his father's country of DR Congo and his mother's country of Angola, before making his debut for the latter in 2021. He played for Angola at the 2023 Africa Cup of Nations.

== Early life ==
Bela was born in Melun, in the Seine-et-Marne department of France. His mother is Angolan and his father is from the Democratic Republic of the Congo. He acquired French nationality in July 2002 as a consequence of his mother's naturalisation.

He played football at AS Herblay from age six to eight and, after a two-year break, joined Ville d'Évry where he spent four years. In the 2007–08 season, he played for Viry-Châtillon in the Championnat fédéral des 14 ans. In 2006, Bela was accepted onto the three-year programme at the Clairefontaine training centre, during which he was capped by France at under-16 level. In late 2008, he told the French Football Federation website that he expected to join Ligue 2 club Lens when he left Clairefontaine, having been scouted by Marc Westerloppe.

== Club career ==
=== Lens ===
Bela progressed through Lens' junior teams, made his reserve-team debut – three minutes in the Championnat de France Amateur (CFA) – in November 2010, and was a regular in the CFA side in the 2011–12 season, with eight goals from 26 appearances. Ahead of the new campaign, he was part of an increasingly youthful reserve squad, many of whom were still eligible for the under-19s.

Bela was involved with the first team in 2012–13 pre-season, and caught the eye of his captain, Jérôme Le Moigne: in an interview in August, Le Moigne picked him out as the Lens player most likely to enjoy a good career in the future, and said he reminded him of former team-mate Lossémy Karaboué. He received his first call-up to the matchday squad for, and then made his debut as a late substitute in, a Ligue 2 match at home to Niort on 5 October 2012 that Lens won 1–0. He made his first start a month later against Armentières in the Coupe de France and scored his debut first-team goal in the 6–0 win. Bela made his first league start on 11 January 2013 in a goalless draw at home to Avignon, and played with increasing regularity in the second half of the season. In mid-February, coach Éric Sikora remarked on how Bela had grasped the connection between training properly and being able to achieve one's aims: after struggling physically in the CFA, he could now string together a series of games at senior level. The player later confirmed that Sikora had spoken to him about maturity, that he had been working on his concentration, and that he recognised the need for hard work to establish himself in the team. Bela injured a hip flexor in the Coupe de France semi-final defeat to Bordeaux, but was able to return to action in time to score his first league goal, in a 2–1 loss away to Le Mans in the last game of the season, taking his totals to three goals from 21 appearances in all competitions.

Out of contract at the end of the 2012–13 season, Bela was keen to stay and progress with Lens, and negotiations over a new deal had begun some time earlier. He remained without a contract throughout July 2013, during which time the club acquired new owners and Antoine Kombouaré replaced Sikora as coach, and eventually signed a three-year professional contract. A wrist sprained during the pre–season tour kept him out of the opening Ligue 2 fixture, and his substitute appearance in the second, a draw away to Dijon, proved to be his last for the club. He was made available to Sikora's CFA team, suffered a foot injury that kept him out for a couple of months and, once fit, resumed his career in the CFA.

=== Dijon ===
With Lens lying third in the division at the mid-season break and little prospect of first-team football, Bela was expected to leave on loan to a lower division or possibly to be sold abroad. In the event, he was allowed to join promotion rivals Dijon where, after a successful trial, he signed a two-and-a-half-year contract on 22 January 2014. Bela made his Dijon FCO debut on 27 January as a late substitute in a goalless draw with Angers, and made three more appearances, all from the bench, over the next few weeks, but a groin problem kept him on the sidelines for the rest of the campaign and into the following pre-season.

Bela returned to the first team as a 70th-minute substitute in the opening game of the 2014–15 season, a 1–1 draw with Nancy, and continued as a regular in the matchday squad. He scored his first goal on 20 October in a 3–0 win over Valenciennes. After a hamstring injury kept him out throughout November, Bela returned as a substitute against Brest on 13 December, and engineered a late winner, tackling the ball against a defender's leg to force an own goal. He scored a stoppage-time winner against Sochaux on 7 February 2015, and in the last game of the season, in a 3–1 win over Nancy, he scored his sixth goal of the season and produced a performance that earned him a place in France Football's team of the week. Speaking in March 2015, manager Olivier Dall'Oglio picked out Bela as one of two players – the other was Júlio Tavares – who had made particular progress over the season, describing him as a player who can change a game.

Interviewed before facing his former club in August 2015, Bela admitted that he had sometimes drifted through the daily routine while at Lens. His lengthy absence through injury in 2014 had given him an awareness of how short a career could be, since when he had taken a more responsible approach to his work. He was instrumental in Dijon's 2–0 win, drawing a foul from Dušan Cvetinović that earned the defender a second yellow card and, a couple of minutes later, producing a powerful strike to score the second goal that relieved the pressure on his team. France Football marked him 8 out of 10 and gave him a place in their team of the week. After three months out with tendinitis in a knee, he came back to earn and convert a match-winning penalty against Créteil at the end of January that strengthened Dijon's position in second place, but his personal season ended in mid-March after he broke his right arm in training. He had contributed four goals from 23 matches to the team's promotion to Ligue 1, which was confirmed a few weeks later, and signed a two-year contract extension in June.

Bela made his Ligue 1 debut as a 78th-minute substitute in a 1–0 loss at home to Nantes in the opening game of the 2016–17 season. However, he found it difficult to retain a place: he started only twice at the higher level and made 12 appearances from the bench. He set up a goal with a pacy run and cross for Loïs Diony in a 3–0 win over Rennes in September, and scored once himself, against Louhans-Cuiseaux in the Coupe de France round of 64.

=== Albacete ===
No longer in Dall'Oglio's plans at Dijon, Bela signed a two-year contract with Albacete, newly promoted to the Spanish Segunda División, early in August 2017. He said he had had no doubts about the move and thought his style – he preferred to play facing the goal and enjoyed one-on-ones – would be well suited to Spanish football.

Bela made his Albacete debut as a substitute after 69 minutes of the opening game of the season, a goalless draw with Granada. Website Queso Mecánico saw flashes of the sort of quick, clever player who can kill a game but thought he lacked fitness. He scored twice to give his side a 2–1 lead away to Osasuna in the Copa Del Rey second round, but Albacete conceded a 94th-minute equaliser and lost 3–2 after extra time. Bela's first league goal was a spectacular right-footed shot from the left edge of the penalty area into the far top corner of the net that tied the scores against Oviedo; Albacete scored again to record their first win of the season. He missed most of October with injury, but was a regular in the starting eleven from November to April. Bela suffered a minor tear to his thigh in April, but his season was ended prematurely in May by a torn hamstring. He had made 37 appearances and scored six goals in all competitions.

Despite injury and fatigue affecting the first half of his season, he scored six goals by the winter break. A fine run of form in the new year earned him the club's Player of the Month award for January, after which he spoke of his satisfaction with his physical fitness, his goalscoring, statistically the best of his career, and his contentment both on and off the field, describing himself as "in general, a better Bela than last year". He contributed another five goals in the regular season, helping Albacete finish fourth, and passed up the chance of an international debut with Angola to make himself available for the promotion play-offs. The first leg of the play-off semi-final, away to Mallorca, ended in a 2–0 defeat; Bela scored with a free kick after 15 minutes of the home leg – his twelfth goal of the season, making him the club's top scorer – but Albacete were eliminated 2–1 on aggregate.

In February, Bela confirmed that he was keen to stay but that issues remained unresolved; after the play-off defeat, and with interest from top-flight Spanish clubs as well as from abroad, he opted to leave. His contract included a one-year option contingent on his making a certain number of appearances; the club's view was that this would come into force automatically, but the player claimed it required mutual consent. In mid-July, with Albacete well into pre-season while Bela trained alone in France, he published his intention to invoke his right to free movement under Spanish law; the club planned court action for breach of contract. The matter dragged on until November, when the player paid the club an undisclosed sum in return for their voiding the contract and waiving legal action.

=== Birmingham City ===
Now a free agent, Bela signed a three-year contract with a one-year option with English Championship (second-tier) club Birmingham City, with whom he had been training for several weeks. He made his debut on 9 November as a second-half substitute in a 1–0 defeat at home to Fulham, and on 7 December away to Reading, he scored a 25-yard (23 m) free kick – which was voted the club's Goal of the Season – and set up a match-winning goal for Álvaro Giménez. A last-minute winner against Blackburn Rovers took Birmingham through to the fourth round of the FA Cup, prompting the Birmingham Mail's correspondent to praise his much-needed productivity from wide positions and compared his "ability to produce a goal out of nothing" to that of the club's then record sale, Ché Adams. Bela continued the rescue act in the next round. At 2–1 down in the replay against League One club Coventry City, "what looked like a cross ... went in off a post to reprieve the Championship side with seconds left of extra time" to take the tie to penalties; he converted his kick as Birmingham won the shootout 4–1. He injured a hamstring at the end of February, by which time he had scored four goals and supplied seven assists. The three-month interruption because of the COVID-19 pandemic gave him time to recover, and his second-half performance at home to Hull City, when he was involved in both equalisers as Birmingham came back from 2–0 and 3–2 down to draw 3–3, secured his struggling side one of just three points gained post-resumption as they narrowly avoided relegation.

Bela scored the only goal of the opening match of the 2020–21 Championship season, at home to Brentford, with a glancing near-post header from Iván Sánchez's 37th-minute corner, to give Birmingham a first win since February. A couple of weeks later, he conceded a penalty in the 86th minute of a match against Rotherham United, but redeemed himself in his role of designated penalty-taker by converting one awarded to his side in the 90th, earning praise from manager Aitor Karanka for his mental strength. Despite losing on-field time for the club because travelling on international duty without playing games had left him tired, he still had more end product by mid-November than any team-mate. He continued as a regular starter; in the final match of Karanka's tenure, a 3–0 defeat to Bristol City, he provided the "assists" from which Scott Hogan twice hit the goalposts, and in the first match under Lee Bowyer, he supplied the cross from which Lukas Jutkiewicz opened the scoring against Reading. Although the Mail suggested that Bowyer's recall of Jutkiewicz meant Bela's crossing ability would be of particular importance as Birmingham tried to avoid relegation, he played only once in the last eight matches.

Ahead of the 2021–22 season, the Mail speculated where the "struggling team's most reliable supplier of assists" might be used, as Bowyer appeared not to favour wingers. The answer, which they did not suggest, was left wing-back. In his first five matches in that position, he made two assists and created more chances. According to Bowyer, the position allowed him to come forward and make crosses and to take set pieces, and Bela had proved against Reading that he could be trusted defensively. The experienced left-back George Friend was impressed with how hard Bela was working to cope with a tiring role, giving the lie to suggestions that he could not last 90 minutes. He played the whole of five consecutive matches in February 2022 to take his total to 99 in all competitions, but, with the return to fitness of centre-back Marc Roberts and the introduction of youngster Nico Gordon allowing Kristian Pedersen to play at left back, was omitted from the squad for the next match. He did not return to the field until 23 April, by which time it had become clear that the club could not afford to take up the option for another year on his contract, and that he was not willing to take what they felt able to offer. Bela scored his ninth goal for Birmingham in a 1–1 draw with Cardiff City during his 101st and final appearance, and left the club when his contract expired at the end of the season. The Birmingham Mail's correspondent thought his departure "regrettable", and until his two-month absence from the side, had considered him "a challenger for Player of the Year, as much for his diligence playing out of position as his actual transition to and performances in the role."

=== Clermont ===
Amid interest and offers from Segunda División clubs Málaga, Tenerife and Leganés which reportedly could not compete financially with those from Ligue 1, Bela chose to return to French football, at least in part for family reasons. He signed a two-year contract with Ligue 1 club Clermont Foot on 2 August 2022. He made his debut on 14 August at home to Reims, who had led 2–0 at half-time, had a man sent off, and conceded twice before Bela came on after 65 minutes. Shortly afterwards, Clermont took the lead, and in the 78th minute, Muhammed Cham let Saîf-Eddine Khaoui's cross go through his legs to Bela, who hit a first-time shot into the top corner of the goal to complete the turnround.

He made 19 appearances in Ligue 1 in his first season with Clermont, mainly as a substitute, and lost significant time to injuries. In his second, he made 12, starting just once, and left the club when his contract expired.

=== PAC Omonia 29M ===
Having been without a club since his release, Bela signed for PAC Omonia 29M, newly promoted to the Cypriot First Division, on 26 September 2024.

== International career ==
While Bela was at the national training centre at Clairefontaine, he was called up to the French under-16 team for two matches against Wales U16 in September 2008. He played in both matches and scored in the first, a 4–2 win.

As well as his native France, Bela qualifies by descent to play for Angola or the DR Congo. In March 2017, he was long-listed by Florent Ibenge, manager of the DR Congo national team, for a friendly against Kenya, but was not in the final squad. He was included in Angola coach Srdjan Vasiljevic's provisional squad for the 2019 Africa Cup of Nations, but did not accept the invitation. Although he considered himself Angolan and was "proud and grateful" to be selected, he felt his priorities had to lie with Albacete's promotion play-off campaign. He was again called up by Angola in September 2020, and played on 13 October as a substitute in an unofficial friendly match against Mozambique. Having finally received confirmation of his Angolan citizenship, he made his official debut on 12 November 2021, in the starting eleven for a 2022 World Cup qualifier against Egypt that ended as a 2–2 draw. He was named in Angola's squad for the 2023 Africa Cup of Nations (held in early 2024), and made three substitute appearances: one in the group stages, one in the round of 16, and – despite leaving the camp to be present at the birth of his son – one in the quarter-final, in which Angola lost 1–0 to Nigeria.

== Career statistics ==
As of match played 14 March 2025

Appearances and goals by club, season and competition
Club	Season	League			National cup (Note: Includes Coupe de France, Copa del Rey, FA Cup)		League cup (Note: Includes Coupe de la Ligue, EFL Cup)		Other		Total	
Club	Season	Division	Apps	Goals	Apps	Goals	Apps	Goals	Apps	Goals	Apps	Goals
Lens B	2010–11	Championnat de France Amateur	8	0	—		—		—		8	0
Lens B	2011–12	Championnat de France Amateur	26	8	—		—		—		26	8
Lens B	2012–13	Championnat de France Amateur	12	6	—		—		—		12	6
Lens B	2013–14	Championnat de France Amateur	8	0	—		—		—		8	0
Lens B	Total		54	14	—		—		—		54	14
Lens	2012–13	Ligue 2	16	1	5	2	0	0	—		21	3
Lens	2013–14	Ligue 2	1	0	0	0	2	0	—		3	0
Lens	Total		17	1	5	2	2	0	—		24	3
Dijon	2013–14	Ligue 2	4	0	0	0	—		—		4	0
Dijon	2014–15	Ligue 2	33	6	1	0	1	0	—		35	6
Dijon	2015–16	Ligue 2	23	4	1	0	2	1	—		26	5
Dijon	2016–17	Ligue 1	14	0	2	1	1	0	—		17	1
Dijon	Total		74	10	4	1	4	1	—		82	12
Dijon B	2013–14	CFA2	4	3	—		—		—		4	3
Dijon B	2014–15	CFA2	3	2	—		—		—		3	2
Dijon B	2016–17	CFA2	2	2	—		—		—		2	2
Dijon B	Total		9	7	—		—		—		9	7
Albacete	2017–18	Segunda División	33	5	1	2	—		—		34	7
Albacete	2018–19	Segunda División	34	11	1	0	—		2 (Note: Appearances in Segunda División play-offs)	1	37	12
Albacete	Total		67	16	2	2	—		2	1	71	19
Birmingham City	2019–20	Championship	30	2	3	2	—		—		33	4
Birmingham City	2020–21	Championship	35	3	1	0	1	0	—		37	3
Birmingham City	2021–22	Championship	31	2	0	0	0	0	—		31	2
Birmingham City	Total		96	7	4	2	1	0	—		101	9
Clermont	2022–23	Ligue 1	19	1	1	0	—		—		20	1
Clermont	2023–24	Ligue 1	12	0	0	0	—		—		12	0
Clermont	Total		31	1	1	0	—		—		32	1
PAC Omonia 29M	2024–25	Cypriot First Division	20	3	0	0	—		—		20	3
Career total			368	59	16	7	7	1	2	1	393	68

== Honours ==
Individual

- Birmingham City Goal of the Season: 2019–20
