= 2019–20 Birmingham City F.C. season =

Birmingham City F.C.
2019–20 season
- Owner: Birmingham Sports Holdings
- Head coach: Pep Clotet (to 8 July 2020); Steve Spooner and Craig Gardner; (caretaker, 8 to 31 July 2020); Aitor Karanka (from 31 July 2020)
- Stadium: St Andrew's
- EFL Championship: 20th
- FA Cup: Fifth round (eliminated by Leicester City)
- EFL Cup: First round (eliminated by Portsmouth)
- Top goalscorer: League: Lukas Jutkiewicz (15); All: Lukas Jutkiewicz (15)
- Highest home attendance: 22,120 (vs Sheffield Wednesday, 22 February 2020)
- Lowest home attendance: 18,161 (vs Queens Park Rangers, 11 December 2019)
- Average home league attendance: 20,411 (Note: The season was interrupted for three months because of the COVID-19 pandemic before being completed behind closed doors; the average attendance only covers those matches played with spectators present.)
Home colours	Away colours	Third colours

The 2019–20 season was Birmingham City Football Club's 117th season in the English football league system and ninth consecutive season in the second-tier EFL Championship. The team finished 20th in the Championship, having avoided relegation on the final day of the season despite losing their own match, after other results went in their favour and Wigan Athletic suffered a 12-point deduction for entering administration. As with all English Football League clubs, the first team also competed in the FA Cup and EFL Cup. They reached the fifth round of the FA Cup, in which they lost 1–0 away to Premier League club Leicester City, and were eliminated in the first round of the EFL Cup, a match in which an inexperienced Birmingham team lost 3–0 away to Portsmouth of League One.

On 13 March 2020, as an initial response to the coronavirus pandemic, professional football in England was suspended until 3 April at the earliest. The Championship resumed behind closed doors on 20 June.

Pep Clotet confirmed on 8 June that he would leave the club at the end of the season, but after a series of poor results, he left by mutual consent on 8 July with four matches of the season remaining.

The season covered the period from 1 July 2019 to the end of the 2019–20 Championship season.

This season is best known for being the debut season of Jude Bellingham, who has gone on to become one of the best players in world football.

== Background and pre-season ==
After a 2018–19 season in which, according to the Birmingham Mail, manager Garry Monk turned the team into "a side vastly superior than the sum of its parts" to keep them in the top half of the table until a run of losses in March and a nine-point deduction for breaches of the EFL's Profitability and Sustainability Rules led to a 17th-place finish. He was sacked on 18 June. CEO Ren Xuandong claimed it was because of "his attempt to use a single agent in transfer deals and his refusal to adapt the team's style of play"; "sources close to Monk" disagreed, and "suggested that Ren's comments were designed to explain the surprise sacking ... that has been badly received by many Birmingham fans." A club statement called for "a fresh and modern footballing philosophy" and committed to improving the squad "sensibly and effectively" while making best use of emerging in-house players. Monk's assistant, Pep Clotet, was appointed caretaker head coach, the remainder of the backroom staff stayed in post, and Craig Gardner was given a role as player-coach.

In response to the financial issues, Birmingham had agreed a business plan with the EFL. When they refused to sell top scorer Ché Adams in January 2019, considering that no offer received was enough to force their hand given that the player could neither be replaced nor loaned back because of the transfer restriction, the Times had suggested that such a refusal might constitute a further breach of the P&S rules. In May 2019, the club was duly charged with failure to adhere to their business plan. In March 2020, 14 months after the alleged breach, it was cleared; the EFL appealed, successfully, but the club received only a reprimand. The decision hinged on whether it was required merely to use its best endeavours to cut spending by a specified amount by the end of the January 2019 transfer window, or to make the cuts regardless of the effect on business efficiency.

The home kit consisted of a royal blue shirt with navy sleeves, white stripes on the shoulders and yellow trim at the collar and cuffs, white shorts with blue stripes down the side seams, and navy socks with white trim at the turnover. The away kit was charcoal, with white stripes on the shoulders, the side seams of the shorts, and the sock turnovers. The team also used the 2018–19 yellow and blue colours as a change kit. The kits were supplied by Adidas and bore the logo of the club's new principal sponsor, Irish bookmaker BoyleSports.

Pre-season match details
Date	Opponents	Venue	Result	Score F–A	Scorers	Attendance	Refs
11 July 2019	Cova da Piedade	N	D	1–1; (3–4 pens.)	Roberts 36'		
13 July 2019	Vitória de Setúbal	A	D	2–2; (3–5 pens.)	Jutkiewicz 13', Pedersen 55'		
19 July 2019	Swindon Town	N	W	6–1	Crowley 5', Vassell 19', Bailey 29', C. Gardner 33', Bellingham (2) 74', 84'	(Note: Because of problems with Swindon's County Ground pitch, the match was moved to Birmingham's training ground and played behind closed doors.)	
20 July 2019	Bristol Rovers	A	W	2–1	Pedersen 12', Jutkiewicz 48'	2,743	
27 July 2019	Brighton & Hove Albion	H	L	0–4		4,846	

== EFL Championship ==
=== August–September ===
Pep Clotet's first competitive match as Birmingham City's head coach was away to Brentford on 3 August 2019. The team lined up in a 3–4–2–1 formation with Lee Camp in goal, Kristian Pedersen, Marc Roberts and newly appointed captain Harlee Dean in central defence, Maxime Colin and debutant Steve Seddon at wing back/wide midfielder, David Davis alongside Gary Gardner in central midfield, and Jacques Maghoma and new arrival Dan Crowley supporting centre forward Lukas Jutkiewicz. According to Sky Sports, "Blues were saved by a combination of the woodwork – which Brentford hit three times before the break – and keeper Lee Camp", and the only goal was scored by Pedersen, whose header from Seddon's cross "looped powerfully and perfectly" over the goalkeeper from outside the penalty area.

Defensive midfielder Ivan Šunjić made a first start and attacking midfielder Fran Villalba made a lively debut at home to Bristol City. Both sides missed chances before Jutkiewicz scored with a powerful header from Roberts' chipped cross. Late in the game, the defence was caught out of position for the visitors' equaliser – last man Wes Harding apologised afterwards for his part in the proceedings. At Nottingham Forest, an unchanged starting eleven suffered Birmingham's first league defeat since March. After a bright start, they were unable to prevent Joe Lolley reacting quickly to a 15th-minute free kick and running through to score; the same player's run and cross set up Lewis Grabban's header seven minutes later, and Michael Dawson's second-half header completed a 3–0 win. Three days later, Birmingham made amends at home to Barnsley. Harding replaced the injured Colin, Seddon returned to the team, and Álvaro Giménez started alongside Jutkiewicz up front. After a low-key and defensively sound first hour, Jutkiewicz converted Harding's cross, Giménez chested down Seddon's through ball and lobbed the goalkeeper, and loanee winger Jefferson Montero made a lively 10-minute cameo on his debut.

In the televised lunchtime visit to Swansea City, still goalless after an hour despite the hosts' domination, Birmingham conceded three in 12 second-half minutes. Montero, who was contractually unavailable to face his parent club, made his full debut at home to Stoke City; he lasted only half an hour before injury forced his replacement by Jude Bellingham, who had made his first Football League appearance as a late substitute at Swansea. A penalty should have been awarded when Danny Batth hauled Giménez back, forced him to the floor and kicked him in the face, and shortly after Dan Crowley replaced the ineffective Villalba, Stoke opened the scoring. Birmingham livened up, Jutkewicz outjumped Tommy Smith at the far post to equalise, and three minutes later, Bellingham's shot crept into the net via a generous deflection to win the match and make him Birmingham's youngest ever goalscorer at 16 years and 93 days.

September began with the visit to Charlton Athletic unbeaten at home for nearly a year and managed by Birmingham's 2011 League Cup-winner Lee Bowyer. Bellingham scored the only goal of the game after a pinpoint pass from Kerim Mrabti. Towards the end, Bowyer's reaction to a time-wasting incident involving the coaching staff saw him sent off and Birmingham's bench receive a yellow card. An unchanged starting eleven struggled at home to Preston North End, who won the match with a first-half free kick that Camp pushed onto the post from which Sean Maguire tapped in the rebound. Derby County hosted Birmingham just days after two Derby players were charged with drink-driving following a car crash that left their captain badly injured. Derby took a two-goal lead, but within minutes Birmingham had equalised with goals from Gardner and Šunjić, the latter a "rasping rising 20-year shot which flew into the net" and won him the Championship Goal of the Month award. Former Birmingham loanee Krystian Bielik fouled Giménez for a penalty, Jutkiewicz missed it, and Derby secured the win with 15 minutes left.

=== October–December ===
Loanee Jake Clarke-Salter made his first league appearance for Birmingham, in place of the injured Roberts away to newly promoted Wigan Athletic. Neither side looked like scoring until Camp let a shot from distance go underneath his body. At home to Middlesbrough, Birmingham had most of the play, but the only goal was Villalba's first for the club from the edge of the area. Both Gardner and Pedersen hit the woodwork, and former Birmingham goalkeeper Darren Randolph made what BBC Sport's reporter dubbed a "string of sublime saves", before, with three minutes of normal time remaining, a defensive error led to an equaliser. Two minutes later, the 19-year-old academy product Odin Bailey headed home Crowley's cross to confirm a first win after three consecutive defeats. Birmingham were the visitors as Leeds United celebrated their centenary: they were defensively sound until Colin allowed Jack Harrison to outpace him and cross for Kalvin Phillips to score. Incidents after the match both inside and outside the ground were described by a police spokesman as "the worst trouble we have seen at Elland Road for over a decade." At home to Blackburn Rovers, Colin headed home Crowley's cross for the only goal after half an hour; Birmingham again failed to convert chances but were able to hold on to their lead. October ended with a third consecutive home win, by two goals to one against Luton Town, that took Birmingham to 11th in the table, one point outside the play-off places; the goals both came from headers, Pedersen's on the stroke of half-time and Jutkiewicz from a corner after 82 minutes.

Birmingham went through November without a win. Away to Cardiff City, Pedersen gave them an early lead but they failed to convert their first-half superiority into goals, Dean conceded a penalty for shirt-pulling which according to BBC Sport's reporter "was tough to spot", and the momentum changed. At 2–1, Cardiff had a player sent off, but they then increased their lead on the break, Dean was sent off in stoppage time, and the match ended 4–2. At home to Fulham, claims that Roberts had been fouled were to no avail when Camp dropped a cross at the feet of Aleksandar Mitrović. Backup goalkeeper Connal Trueman made his first appearance of the season and Jérémie Bela his first start in a better team performance at Huddersfield Town, in which Birmingham came back from a goal behind when Roberts' header was deflected in off Jutkiewicz's shoulder. Ahead of the visit to Garry Monk's new club, Sheffield Wednesday, the former Birmingham manager claimed he had made an "error of judgment" in working with Clotet, suggested he was untrustworthy, and refused the customary pre-match handshake. Starting instead of Jutkiewicz, Giménez opened the scoring from Bela's cross, but Wednesday equalised with ten minutes left. BBC Sport thought Birmingham "twice unlucky not to be awarded spot-kicks" as Millwall failed to retain a lead thanks to a combination of Clarke-Salter's header and Trueman's performance in goal.

Making his first start, Josh McEachran contributed to a 3–2 win away to Reading in which Birmingham's former captain, Michael Morrison, opened the scoring with an own goal, and Bela scored with a 25-yard (23 m) free kick that was voted Birmingham's goal of the season before setting up Giménez' matchwinner. The rest of the year went winless and, but for Mrabti's penalty at Blackburn Rovers, pointless. Defensively poor against Queens Park Rangers and "half a yard off everything" against Hull City, Birmingham led second-placed West Bromwich Albion until substitute Charlie Austin scored two late goals, and came from behind to equalise three times against table-topping Leeds United before losing 5–4 to Wes Harding's 95th-minute own goal.

=== January–March ===
Bottom-of-the-table Wigan Athletic celebrated the new year with their first away win of the season as, with two senior centre-backs injured, Clotet's selection of midfielder Gary Gardner as a makeshift central defender, in preference to Harding or the youngster Bajrami, backfired. A positional mix-up between Bellingham and Gardner led to Wigan's first goal, their second was his own goal, and the third came when Jutkiewicz's attempt at a headed clearance rebounded off a Wigan player. Away to Luton Town, who had replaced Wigan at the foot of the table, Clotet again made changes: Clarke-Salter was fit to play at centre-back and, despite a fine performance by Trueman against Wigan, Camp returned in goal, and in central midfield, Davis came in to partner Gardner, who scored the winning goal. At home to Cardiff City, with Roberts fit to replace the suspended Dean and Sunjic alongside Bellingham, who opened the scoring and came close to a second, but Cardiff equalised with a header from a corner.

Jutkiewicz scored his tenth goal of the season at Middlesbrough before the hosts equalised, and Camp saved a penalty. Late in the game a collision between Bellingham and Marcus Tavernier left the latter on the ground; both teams played on, and Jutkiewicz appeared to score. However, with Middlesbrough staff on the field demanding play be stopped for treatment to their player, the referee blew his whistle before the ball crossed the line. In the subsequent melee, two staff members – one from each side – were sent off. Writing in The Sunday Times, Rod Liddle saw the incident as an example of the increasing trend for players, with the apparent support of their managerial staff, to "play possum" to provoke the referee into stopping an opposition attack for fear of missing a serious injury.

On 29 January, Aston Villa recalled striker Scott Hogan from Stoke City, where he had scored little and fallen out of favour, and loaned him to Birmingham. Playing in partnership with Jutkiewicz, he was an immediate success. Visitors Nottingham Forest scored early, but when Pedersen conceded a penalty, Camp saved and initiated a Birmingham attack which ended with Hogan's close-range equaliser from Jutkiewicz's headed pass. Pedersen scored a late winner. At Bristol City, despite Roberts' careless back-pass gifting the hosts a first-minute lead, Hogan was available to tap in the rebound from Bela's shot, and Birmingham went on to win 3–1, and away at Barnsley, he missed a straightforward chance early in the game but scored a second-half winner. Hogan's dummy was instrumental in Jutkiewicz's goal in a draw at Brentford, and he scored a last-minute equaliser against Sheffield Wednesday from Jutkiewicz's header. A goalless draw at Millwall, in which Pedersen's volleyed strike was disallowed for pushing by Dean, was marred by reported racial abuse of Jérémie Bela by a spectator. February ended with a 2–2 draw away to Queens Park Rangers in which Bela injured a hamstring and Hogan's two goals took his record to six in seven league matches, which earned him the EFL Championship Player of the Month award.

=== Season suspended ===
Hogan scored again as Birmingham lost 3–1 at home to Reading on 7 March. Six days later, as an initial response to the coronavirus pandemic, professional football in England was suspended until 3 April at the earliest. Birmingham were reported to be the first Championship club to ask their higher-paid players to take wage deferrals over the coronavirus-affected period; some at least agreed.

At a meeting in May, Championship clubs confirmed their intention to finish the season if possible, and aimed to resume training on 25 May. On 31 May, the EFL announced a restart date of 20 June, "subject to the strict proviso that all safety requirements and government guidance is met". Matches would be played behind closed doors, would include drinks breaks, and teams could name nine substitutes and use five. Birmingham's squad was significantly reduced in size. Of those whose contracts expired on 30 June, Camp, Hogan and Clarke-Salter extended their deals to cover the last nine games, while the rest, including first-team regulars Maghoma and Mrabti, did not. Fringe players returning from loans at clubs whose seasons had been ended early, although theoretically available for the parent club, were effectively unusable after the EFL clarified that they could only be used if a club could not otherwise field a full 20-man matchday squad even after under-23s, academy players and scholars had been included.

With two weeks to go before the restart, Birmingham announced that Clotet would be leaving at the end of the season to "explore other coaching opportunities", having, in his view, fulfilled his brief of improving the playing style, developing young and home-grown players, and still getting acceptable results within restrictive financial constraints.

=== Restart: the last nine matches ===
Birmingham resumed their season 16th in the table and eight points clear of the relegation places. Without the injured Pedersen, Roberts and Šunjić, Clotet said that the "last thing [he] wanted was an open game". His team complied, putting up a sound defensive display to secure a goalless draw away to West Bromwich Albion. Visitors Hull City scored two first-half goals before Bela replaced Kieftenbeld at half-time and Birmingham levelled the scores. Hull regained the lead when the defensive wall jumped over Herbie Kane's 20-yard (18 m) free kick, but Gardner's 88th-minute header from Bela's cross secured a draw. A 3–0 defeat at home to relegation rivals Huddersfield Town preceded a visit to Fulham, who were without star striker Aleksandar Mitrović, in which Bellingham might have had an early hat-trick and Camp put in an excellent performance to hold Fulham out until the fifth minute of stoppage time. Jutkiewicz scored after five minutes against Swansea City, but increasingly characteristic defensive frailty, particularly in home matches, led to a 3–1 loss, after which board and Clotet came to a mutual agreement to part ways immediately. With four matches left and four points above the relegation zone, professional development coach Steve Spooner and first-team coach Craig Gardner took caretaker charge. Jutkiewicz denied that the players had been adversely affected by knowing that Clotet would be leaving, and stated that they needed to take collective responsibility for what happened on the pitch.

A defeat at Stoke City was mitigated by the confirmation that Wigan Athletic had entered administration and would, according to league rules, be deducted 12 points if they finished outside the relegation positions. Hogan missed an early penalty at home to fellow strugglers Charlton Athletic, who took the lead after an hour; Bellingham came off the bench, "lifted Blues with his energy and ingenuity", and crossed for Dean's blocked shot that was turned in by Jutkiewicz for a stoppage-time equaliser and a career-record 15th goal of the season. Yet another failure to defend set pieces led to a 2–0 defeat away to Preston North End, which left Birmingham facing the last match of the season, at home to Derby County, unlikely to go down but still not safe. Before that match, Bellingham's transfer to Borussia Dortmund, for a Birmingham club-record fee understood by Sky Sports to be an initial £25 million – making him the most expensive 17-year-old in history – plus "several million more" dependent on performance-related criteria, was confirmed. He was allowed to play, and despite Birmingham conceding three goals at home for the sixth time in seven matches, the defeat was not enough to relegate them.

=== Match results ===
General source: Match content not verifiable from these sources is referenced individually.

Date	League position	Opponents	Venue	Result	Score F–A	Scorers	Attendance	Refs
3 August 2019	8th	Brentford	A	W	1–0	Pedersen 18'	11,332	
10 August 2019	8th	Bristol City	H	D	1–1	Jutkiewicz 64'	21,808	
17 August 2019	15th	Nottingham Forest	A	L	0–3		27,281	
20 August 2019	8th	Barnsley	H	W	2–0	Jutkiewicz 69', Giménez 77'	20,061	
25 August 2019	15th	Swansea City	A	L	0–3		17,277	
31 August 2019	9th	Stoke City	H	W	2–1	Jutkiewicz 73', Bellingham 76'	20,652	
14 September 2019	8th	Charlton Athletic	A	W	1–0	Bellingham 52'	18,752	
21 September 2019	11th	Preston North End	H	L	0–1		20,806	
28 September 2019	13th	Derby County	A	L	2–3	G. Gardner 56', Šunjić 59'	28,454	
1 October 2019	14th	Wigan Athletic	A	L	0–1		9,244	
4 October 2019	12th	Middlesbrough	H	W	2–1	Villalba 33', Bailey 89'	19,703	
19 October 2019	12th	Leeds United	A	L	0–1		35,731	
22 October 2019	11th	Blackburn Rovers	H	W	1–0	Colin 31'	18,561	
26 October 2019	11th	Luton Town	H	W	2–1	Pedersen 45+3', Jutkiewicz 82'	21,799	
2 November 2019	12th	Cardiff City	A	L	2–4	Pedersen 3', Šunjić 89'	23,778	
9 November 2019	13th	Fulham	H	L	0–1		21,334	
23 November 2019	14th	Huddersfield Town	A	D	1–1	Jutkiewicz 78'	22,573	
27 November 2019	15th	Sheffield Wednesday	A	D	1–1	Giménez 48'	22,059	
30 November 2019	15th	Millwall	H	D	1–1	Clarke-Salter 79'	19,715	
7 December 2019	13th	Reading	A	W	3–2	Morrison 41' o.g., Bela 59', Giménez 88'	14,103	
11 December 2019	15th	Queens Park Rangers	H	L	0–2		18,161	
14 December 2019	15th	West Bromwich Albion	H	L	2–3	Jutkiewicz 3', Dean 47'	20,796	
21 December 2019	15th	Hull City	A	L	0–3		11,334	
26 December 2019	16th	Blackburn Rovers	A	D	1–1	Mrabti 63' pen.	15,887	
29 December 2019	17th	Leeds United	H	L	4–5	Bellingham 27', Jutkiewicz 61', 90+1', Bela 83'	22,059	
1 January 2020	18th	Wigan Athletic	H	L	2–3	Mrabti 39', Maghoma 81'	18,616	
11 January 2020	18th	Luton Town	A	W	2–1	Jutkiewicz 4', G. Gardner 69'	10,062	
18 January 2020	18th	Cardiff City	H	D	1–1	Bellingham 4'	20,482	
21 January 2020	18th	Middlesbrough	A	D	1–1	Jutkiewicz 27'	18,350	
1 February 2020	17th	Nottingham Forest	H	W	2–1	Hogan 42', Pedersen 74'	20,837	
7 February 2020	14th	Bristol City	A	W	3–1	Hogan 23', Weimann 30' o.g., Jutkiewicz 90+2'	22,065	
11 February 2020	14th	Barnsley	A	W	1–0	Hogan 76'	12,788	
15 February 2020	14th	Brentford	H	D	1–1	Jutkiewicz 13'	20,379	
22 February 2020	14th	Sheffield Wednesday	H	D	3–3	Murphy 6' o.g., Jutkiewicz 30', Hogan 90+1'	22,120	
26 February 2020	14th	Millwall	A	D	0–0		11,209	
29 February 2020	15th	Queens Park Rangers	A	D	2–2	Hogan 24', 81'	14,113	
7 March 2020	16th	Reading	H	L	1–3	Hogan 6'	19,525	
20 June 2020	16th	West Bromwich Albion	A	D	0–0		0	
27 June 2020	16th	Hull City	H	D	3–3	G. Gardner 47', 88', Crowley 60'	0	
1 July 2020	17th	Huddersfield Town	H	L	0–3		0	
4 July 2020	17th	Fulham	A	L	0–1		0	
8 July 2020	17th	Swansea City	H	L	1–3	Jutkiewicz 5'	0	
12 July 2020	18th	Stoke City	A	L	0–2		0	
15 July 2020	19th	Charlton Athletic	H	D	1–1	Jutkiewicz 90+3'	0	
18 July 2020	20th	Preston North End	A	L	0–2		0	
22 July 2020	20th	Derby County	H	L	1–3	Šunjić 56'	0	

=== League table ===
Pos	Team	Pld	W	D	L	GF	GA	GD	Pts	Promotion, qualification or relegation
17	Middlesbrough	46	13	14	19	48	61	−13	53	
18	Huddersfield Town	46	13	12	21	52	70	−18	51	
19	Luton Town	46	14	9	23	54	82	−28	51	
20	Birmingham City	46	12	14	20	54	75	−21	50	
21	Barnsley	46	12	13	21	49	69	−20	49	
22	Charlton Athletic (R)	46	12	12	22	50	65	−15	48	Relegation to EFL League One
23	Wigan Athletic (R)	46	15	14	17	57	56	+1	47 (Note: As a result of Wigan Athletic entering administration, the club was subject to a 12-point deduction. In accordance with EFL regulations, the timing of the sporting sanction was only determined once final league placings in the Championship were determined. Since the club did not finish in the relegation places at the end of season, the sanction was applied to their 2019–20 total and final league standings were amended as appropriate.)	Relegation to EFL League One

Rules for classification: 1) Points; 2) Goal difference; 3) Number of goals scored; 4) Head-to-head results; 5) Wins; 6) Away goals; 7) Penalty points (sec 9.5); 8) 12-point sending off offences
(R) Relegated

=== Result summary ===
Overall								Home						Away					
Pld	W	D	L	GF	GA	GD	Pts	W	D	L	GF	GA	GD	W	D	L	GF	GA	GD
46	12	14	20	54	75	−21	50	6	7	10	33	42	−9	6	7	10	21	33	−12

== FA Cup ==
As with all teams in the top two division, Birmingham entered the FA Cup in the third round. They were drawn to play at home to Championship club Blackburn Rovers. Clotet made seven changes from the previous league match, with Camp, Clarke-Salter, Davis, Maghoma, Crowley, Montero and Giménez replacing Trueman, Jutkiewicz, Bellingham, Bela, McEachran, Mrabti and Šunjić in the starting eleven. Crowley gave Birmingham an early lead with an individual effort, but Blackburn came back into the match and, after an hour, Šunjić came on for Gary Gardner to solidify the defence. Within two minutes, he fouled Sam Gallagher for a penalty and was sent off. Birmingham were obliged to use their last substitute when Harding came on for the tiring Clarke-Salter, and were in danger of being overrun when Maghoma's run played in Bela whose 90th-minute shot was diverted low into the far corner to give his team a 2–1 win.

In the fourth round, Birmingham were drawn away to the winners of a replay between League One clubs Bristol Rovers and Coventry City. Coventry, who were without their own ground for the 2019–20 season and had entered into a ground-sharing agreement with Birmingham, won the replay, so Birmingham faced the prospect of using the away dressing room and with their supporters in the away end, while their tenants benefited from the home team's facilities.

FA Cup match details
Round	Date	Opponents	Venue	Result	Score F–A	Scorers	Attendance	Refs
Third round	4 January 2020	Blackburn Rovers	H	W	2–1	Crowley 4', Bela 90'	7,330	
Fourth round	25 January 2020	Coventry City	A	D	0–0		21,193	
Fourth round replay	4 February 2020	Coventry City	H	D	2–2 (4–1 p)	Dean 90+2', Bela 120'	11,680	
Fifth round	4 March 2020	Leicester City	A	L	0–1		27,181	

== EFL Cup ==
Birmingham were drawn to play away to League One club Portsmouth in the first round. Clotet chose to make nine changes from the team that started the opening league match, and the resulting eleven included four debutants: Jake Clarke-Salter and Geraldo Bajrami in defence, and Agus Medina and Jude Bellingham in midfield. All but five of the matchday squad had come through Birmingham's youth system. Bellingham became Birmingham City's youngest ever first-team player at the age of 16 years, 38 days, beating the record of 16 years 139 days set by Trevor Francis in 1970. After a lively start, Portsmouth's strength and experience brought two first-half goals, and the third followed soon after half-time. Another two academy products, midfielders Odin Bailey and Caolan Boyd-Munce, made their debuts in the second half.

EFL Cup match details
Round	Date	Opponents	Venue	Result	Score F–A	Scorers	Attendance	Refs
First round	6 August 2019	Portsmouth	A	L	0–3		9,913	

== Transfers ==
=== In ===
Date	Player	Club †	Fee	Refs
5 June 2019	Gary Gardner	Aston Villa	Undisclosed	
5 July 2019	Jayden Reid	(Swansea City)	Free	
18 July 2019	Dan Crowley	Willem II	Undisclosed	
26 July 2019	Ivan Šunjić	Dinamo Zagreb	Undisclosed	
27 July 2019	Iván Guzmán	(UE Olot)	Free	
28 July 2019	Agus Medina	(UE Cornellà)	Free	
6 August 2019	Álvaro Giménez	Almería	Undisclosed	
7 August 2019	Fran Villalba	Valencía	Free	
15 August 2019	Miguel Fernández	(UE Cornellà)	Free	
1 September 2019	Bernard Sun	(Estudiantes de Murcia)	Free	
27 September 2019	Josh McEachran	(Brentford)	Free	
6 November 2019	Jérémie Bela	(Albacete)	Free	

† Brackets round a club's name indicate the player's contract with that club had expired before he joined Birmingham.

==== Loans in ====
Date	Player	Club	Return	Refs
24 July 2019	Jake Clarke-Salter	Chelsea	End of season	
31 July 2019	Moha Ramos	Real Madrid	End of season	
9 August 2019	Jefferson Montero	Swansea City	End of season	
29 January 2020	Scott Hogan	Aston Villa	End of season	

=== Out ===
Date	Player	Club †	Fee	Refs
1 July 2019	Che Adams	Southampton	Undisclosed	
8 August 2019	Isaac Vassell	Cardiff City	Undisclosed	
30 June 2020	George Baker	(Ytterhogdals IK)	Released	
30 June 2020	Joshua Bradley-Hurst		Released at end of scholarship	
30 June 2020	Ben Forrest	(Stafford Rangers)	Released	
30 June 2020	Craig Gardner		Retired	
30 June 2020	Jonathan Grounds	(Swindon Town)	Released	
30 June 2020	Rhys Hilton	(Sutton Coldfield Town)	Released	
30 June 2020	Cheick Keita	(HNK Gorica)	Released	
30 June 2020	Nick Kinina		Released at end of scholarship	
30 June 2020	Kai Knight		Released at end of scholarship	
30 June 2020	Michael Luyambula	(VfB Lübeck)	Released	
30 June 2020	Jacques Maghoma	(East Bengal)	Released	
30 June 2020	Olly McCoy		Released	
30 June 2020	Kerim Mrabti	(KV Mechelen)	Released	
30 June 2020	Corey O'Keeffe	(Mansfield Town)	Released	
30 June 2020	Lucas Powell	(Wigan Athletic)	Released at end of scholarship	
30 June 2020	Adam Siviter		Released	
30 June 2020	David Stockdale	(Wycombe Wanderers)	Released	
30 June 2020	Oumar Traoré	(Nîmes B)	Released at end of scholarship	
30 June 2020	Jake Weaver	(Leamington)	Released	
22 July 2020	Álvaro Giménez	Cádiz	Undisclosed	
23 July 2020	Jude Bellingham	Borussia Dortmund	Undisclosed	(Note: The fee was undisclosed, but was understood by Sky Sports to be an initial £25 million – making him the most expensive 17-year-old in history – plus "several million more" dependent on performance-related criteria.)
3 August 2020	Lee Camp		Released	

† Brackets round a club's name denote the player joined that club after his Birmingham City contract expired.

==== Loans out ====
Date	Player	Club	Return	Refs
12 July 2019	Michael Luyambula	Crawley Town	Recalled 18 January 2020	
18 July 2019	Zach Jeacock	Gloucester City	Recalled 4 February 2020	
26 July 2019	Adam Siviter	Hungerford Town	End of season	
27 July 2019	Iván Guzmán	UE Cornellà	End of season	
31 July 2019	Jake Weaver	Leamington	End of season	
2 August 2019	Remeao Hutton	Yeovil Town	End of season	
2 August 2019	Olly McCoy	Yeovil Town	2 January 2020	
8 August 2019	Josh Dacres-Cogley	Crawley Town	End of season	
9 August 2019	Corey O'Keeffe	Macclesfield Town	End of season	
22 August 2019	Charlie Lakin	Stevenage	End of season	
2 September 2019	Joshua Bradley-Hurst	Gloucester City	October 2019	
2 January 2020	Steve Seddon	Portsmouth	End of season	
15 January 2020	Agus Medina	UE Cornellà	End of season	
24 January 2020	Odin Bailey	Forest Green Rovers	End of season	
24 January 2020	Olly McCoy	Wealdstone	End of season	
24 January 2020	David Stockdale	Wycombe Wanderers	End of season	
27 January 2020	Fran Villalba	Almería	End of season	
30 January 2020	Michael Luyambula	AFC Telford United	16 May 2020	
31 January 2020	David Davis	Charlton Athletic	End of season	
31 January 2020	Joe Redmond	Cork City	30 June 2020	
31 January 2020	Álvaro Giménez	Cádiz	Made permanent 22 July 2020	
20 February 2020	Geraldo Bajrami	Solihull Moors	End of season	
27 February 2020	Joshua Bradley-Hurst	Leamington	Short-term	

== Appearances and goals ==
Numbers in parentheses denote appearances made as a substitute.
Players marked † left the club during the playing season.
Players with names in italics and marked * were on loan from another club for the whole of their season with Birmingham.
Players listed with no appearances have been in the matchday squad but only as unused substitutes.
Key to positions: GK – Goalkeeper; DF – Defender; MF – Midfielder; FW – Forward

Players' appearances and goals by competition
No.	Pos.	Nat.	Name	League		FA Cup		EFL Cup		Total		Discipline	
No.	Pos.	Nat.	Name	Apps	Goals	Apps	Goals	Apps	Goals	Apps	Goals	A yellow rectangle, denoting the yellow penalty card shown to a player being cautioned	A red rectangle, denoting the red penalty card shown to a player being sent off
1	GK	NIR	Lee Camp	36	0	4	0	0	0	40	0	0	0
2	DF	ENG	Wes Harding	7 (8)	0	2 (1)	0	1	0	10 (9)	0	5 (Note: Soccerbase mistakenly attributes Harding's yellow card against Barnsley in August to Giménez.)	0
3	DF	DEN	Kristian Pedersen	44	4	4	0	0	0	48	4	3	0
4	DF	ENG	Marc Roberts	33 (1)	0	1	0	0	0	34 (1)	0	6	0
5	DF	FRA	Maxime Colin	44	1	3	0	0	0	47	1	4	0
6	MF	NED	Maikel Kieftenbeld	2 (6)	0	1	0	0	0	3 (6)	0	0	0
7	MF	IRL	Dan Crowley	29 (9)	1	1 (1)	1	1	0	31 (10)	2	4	0
8	MF	ENG	Craig Gardner	0	0	0	0	1	0	1	0	0	0
10	FW	ENG	Lukas Jutkiewicz	42 (4)	15	2 (1)	0	0	0	44 (5)	15	7	0
11	FW	ENG	Isaac Vassell †	0	0	0	0	0	0	0	0	0	0
11	FW	FRA	Jérémie Bela	22 (8)	2	0 (3)	2	0	0	22 (11)	4	0	0
12	DF	ENG	Harlee Dean	34 (5)	1	4	1	0	0	38 (5)	2	4	2
13	GK	ENG	David Stockdale	0	0	0	0	1	0	1	0	0	0
14	DF	ENG	Jake Clarke-Salter *	19	1	3	0	1	0	23	1	7	0
15	DF	ECU	Jefferson Montero *	2 (12)	0	3 (1)	0	0	0	5 (13)	0	1	0
16	MF	ENG	Josh McEachran	5 (3)	0	2	0	0	0	7 (3)	0	2	0
17	MF	ESP	Fran Villalba	15 (2)	1	0	0	0	0	15 (2)	1	0	0
18	MF	SWE	Kerim Mrabti	12 (3)	2	2	0	0	0	15 (3)	2	3	0
19	MF	COD	Jacques Maghoma	7 (11)	1	2 (1)	0	0	0	9 (12)	1	1	0
20	MF	ENG	Gary Gardner	27 (8)	4	1 (3)	0	0	0	28 (11)	4	14	0
21	MF	ESP	Agus Medina	0 (1)	0	0	0	1	0	1 (1)	0	1	0
22	MF	ENG	Jude Bellingham	32 (9)	4	2	0	1	0	35 (9)	4	8	0
23	GK	ESP	Moha Ramos *	0	0	0	0	0	0	0	0	0	0
24	FW	ESP	Álvaro Giménez	12 (12)	3	1	0	0	0	13 (12)	3	5	0
25	DF	ENG	Josh Dacres-Cogley	0	0	0	0	1	0	1	0	0	0
26	MF	ENG	David Davis	13 (2)	0	1	0	0	0	14 (2)	0	5	0
27	GK	ENG	Connal Trueman	10	0	0	0	0	0	10	0	0	0
28	FW	ESP	Miguel Fernández	0 (1)	0	0	0	0	0	0 (1)	0	0	0
30	DF	IRL	Corey O'Keeffe	0	0	0	0	0	0	0	0	0	0
31	MF	ENG	Charlie Lakin	0	0	0	0	1	0	1	0	0	0
33	DF	MLI	Cheick Keita	0	0	0	0	0	0	0	0	0	0
34	MF	CRO	Ivan Šunjić	37 (3)	3	3 (1)	0	0	0	40 (4)	3	9	1
37	MF	ENG	Odin Bailey	0 (6)	1	0	0	0 (1)	0	0 (7)	1	1	0
40	FW	IRL	Scott Hogan *	16 (1)	7	1	0	0	0	17 (1)	7	0	0
42	DF	ENG	Steve Seddon	3 (1)	0	0	0	1	0	4 (1)	0	1	0
43	DF	ALB	Geraldo Bajrami	2	0	0	0	1	0	3	0	1	0
44	MF	NIR	Caolan Boyd-Munce	0 (6)	0	0 (1)	0	0 (1)	0	0 (8)	0	0	0
45	DF	IRL	Ryan Burke	0 (1)	0	0	0	0	0	0 (1)	0	1	0
46	DF	IRL	Joe Redmond	0	0	0	0	0	0	0	0	0	0
47	MF	WAL	Ryan Stirk	0	0	0	0	0	0	0	0	0	0
48	MF	ENG	Jack Concannon	0	0	1	0	0	0	1	0	1	0
49	FW	ENG	Jayden Reid	0 (3)	0	0	0	0	0	0 (3)	0	0	0
50	DF	ENG	Nico Gordon	1 (1)	0	0	0	0	0	1 (1)	0	1	0

Players not included in matchday squads
No.	Pos.	Nat.	Name
29	DF	ENG	Jonathan Grounds
51	MF	ENG	Kyle Hurst
