= Gary Gardner =

English footballer (born 1992)

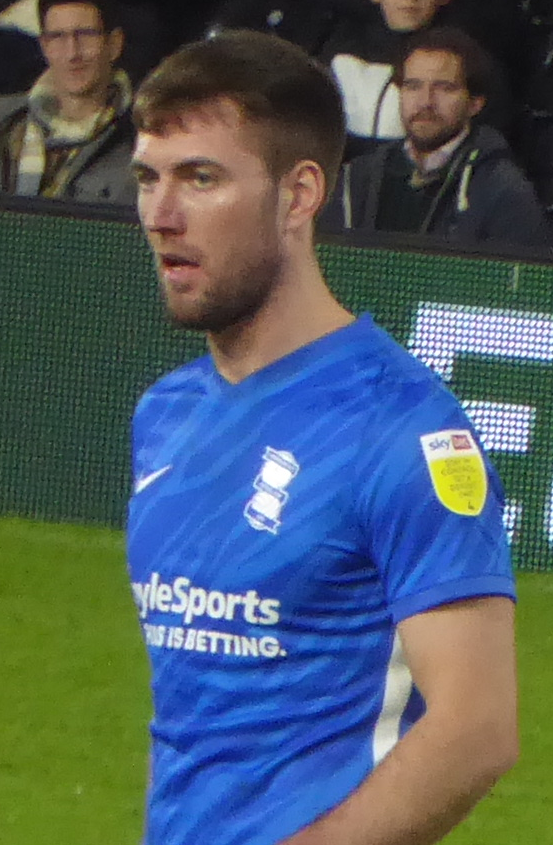
- Gardner playing for Birmingham City in 2022

Personal information
- Full name: Gary Gardner
- Date of birth: 29 June 1992 (age 34)
- Place of birth: Solihull, England
- Height: 6 ft 2 in (1.88 m)
- Position: Central midfielder

Youth career
- 2005–2011: Aston Villa

Senior career*
Years	Team	Apps	(Gls)
2011–2019	Aston Villa	42	(1)
2011	→ Coventry City (loan)	4	(1)
2014	→ Sheffield Wednesday (loan)	3	(0)
2014	→ Brighton & Hove Albion (loan)	17	(2)
2015	→ Nottingham Forest (loan)	18	(4)
2016	→ Nottingham Forest (loan)	20	(2)
2017–2018	→ Barnsley (loan)	29	(2)
2018–2019	→ Birmingham City (loan)	40	(2)
2019–2024	Birmingham City	130	(13)
2024–2025	Cambridge United	0	(0)

International career
2009	England U17	6	(0)
2009–2011	England U19	2	(1)
2009	England U20	2	(0)
2011–2012	England U21	5	(2)
- * Club domestic league appearances and goals as of 10:26, 10 May 2025 (UTC)

Gary Gardner (born 29 June 1992) is an English former professional footballer who played as a central midfielder and was last at EFL League One side Cambridge United.

A product of the Aston Villa Academy, Gardner made his senior debut while on loan at Coventry City. He first played competitively for Aston Villa in late 2011, and went on to spend time on loan at Sheffield Wednesday, Brighton & Hove Albion, Nottingham Forest, Barnsley and Birmingham City, before joining Birmingham on a permanent contract in 2019. He was released at the end of the 2023–24 season and subsequently joined Cambridge United.

He has made a number of appearances at under-age levels for England, including five for England U21. He is the younger brother of former Birmingham City technical director Craig Gardner.

== Club career ==
=== Aston Villa ===
==== Youth career ====
Gardner started his career at Aston Villa with older brother Craig. His development was interrupted by an anterior cruciate ligament (ACL) injury sustained in December 2009. On his return, he became an important member of Aston Villa's under-18 and reserve sides.

Gardner scored twice in Aston Villa reserves' 10–1 win over Arsenal on 10 January 2011, firstly catching out Gunners' goalkeeper James Shea to break the deadlock before scoring another from the penalty spot. He also claimed assists for Andreas Weimann's and Jonathan Hogg's goals. The midfielder first played for Aston Villa's first team in a pre-season friendly, coming on as a substitute for captain Stiliyan Petrov in the 2011 Barclays Asia Trophy final loss to Chelsea.

He also represented Aston Villa in the inaugural season of the NextGen Series, a European competition for younger footballers similar in format to the UEFA Champions League. During the group stage, Gardner scored single goals against Fenerbahçe and Rosenborg. In Villa's last group match, Gardner scored all three goals in a 3–0 victory over Ajax. He scored a last-minute equaliser in the quarter-final match against Marseille, but Villa went on to lose the tie 2–1 in extra time. Gardner's six goals left him one short of the competition's joint-highest goalscorers, Jean Marie Dongou of Barcelona and Viktor Fischer of Ajax, with seven.

==== Senior debut ====
Gardner joined Coventry City in later November 2011 on a month's loan. He scored just 9 minutes into his début in a 2–1 defeat against Brighton & Hove Albion on 26 November. After making four appearances for the Sky Blues in the Championship in his first 28 days, Gardner was recalled by his parent club who were suffering injury problems.

On 31 December, Gardner made his first senior appearance for Villa in a 3–1 away win at Chelsea, as a 78th-minute substitute for Marc Albrighton. He came off the bench again a week later as Villa beat Bristol Rovers in the third round of the FA Cup, and made his first start on 21 January 2012, in a 3–2 win away at Wolverhampton Wanderers.

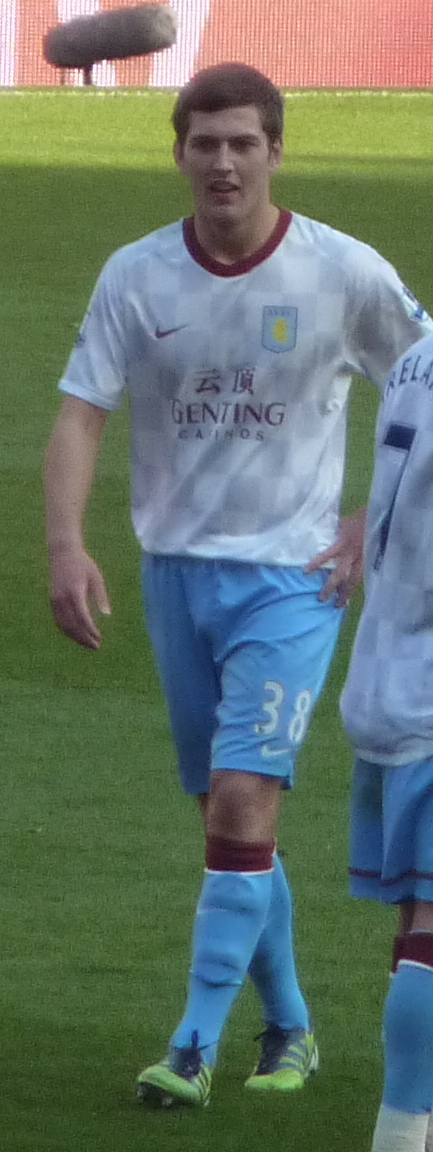
Gardner with Aston Villa in 2012

Gardner suffered another ACL injury in August 2012, this time in his right knee. He returned to the Villa first team as an unused substitute against Chelsea on 11 May 2013 and made his playing comeback on the final day of the season against Wigan Athletic.

==== Loan spells ====
He made four starts for Sheffield Wednesday during a month's loan in February and March 2014, and signed a two-year contract with Villa at the end of the season.

Over the course of those two years, Gardner made no further appearances for Villa but spent three spells out on loan at Championship level. He played 20 matches in all competitions for Brighton & Hove Albion in the first half of the 2014–15 season and scored twice, a winner against Wigan Athletic in early November that broke a 12-match winless run and took Albion out of the relegation places, and a goal in a 1–1 draw with Blackburn Rovers a few days later. Gardner spent the second half of the season at Nottingham Forest, scoring 4 goals from 18 league appearances; he "thundered home a 30-yard drive via the bar" against Reading in February that was voted Sky Sports News' #goaloftheday. On his return, he was offered and signed a three-year contract. Gardner returned to Forest for the second half of the 2015–16 season, scoring twice from 22 appearances.

==== Return to Villa and more loans ====
After Villa's relegation from the Premier League, Gardner became a regular member of their first-team squad. He made 26 Championship appearances for the club in the 2016–17 season, and scored his first senior goal for Villa on 30 October to open the scoring against local rivals Birmingham City. According to BBC Sport's reporter, he "ran the length of the field to celebrate with 1,988 away fans after superbly heading the visitors in front", but the match ended as a 1–1 draw. The arrival of several midfielders pushed him out of contention for the first team, and at the end of August 2017 he joined Championship club Barnsley on loan for the remainder of the 2017–18 season. He made 29 league appearances and scored twice, in a 3–2 win against Sheffield United on 7 April and a 2–2 draw with Bolton Wanderers a week later, as Barnsley were unable to avoid relegation.

Gardner joined yet another Championship club, Birmingham City, on 9 August 2018 on loan for the 2018–19 season. He made his debut in the starting eleven for the 2–0 defeat away to Reading in the EFL Cup first round, and retained his place for the rest of the season. He missed only four matches: those against his parent club, for which he was ineligible – Birmingham did ask Villa if they would allow him to participate, but manager Garry Monk said it was "a short conversation" – the 3–3 draw with Hull City in November for which he was suspended, and the final match of the season, when several first-team regulars were left out.

=== Birmingham City ===
Gardner signed a three-year contract with Birmingham City on 5 June 2019. On the same day, Jota moved in the opposite direction; the fees were undisclosed. He was released at the end of the 2023–24 season.

=== Cambridge United ===
Gardner signed a two-year deal with EFL League One club Cambridge United on 14 July 2024. After injuries meant he was unable to make a debut for the club, he left by mutual agreement on 8 May 2025.

== International career ==
Gardner has played for England at numerous international levels, including under-17s, under-18s, under-20s and the under-21s.

On 10 November 2011, Gardner came on as a substitute, replacing Jason Lowe in the 62nd minute, and scored his first two goals for the England under-21s against Iceland under-21s.

== Personal life ==
Gardner is the brother of fellow professional footballer Craig Gardner, also a product of the Aston Villa youth system. The siblings contribute funds to a boxing gym in their home town of Birmingham, which was featured on an episode of Soccer AM in 2011.

== Career statistics ==
As of end of 2024–25 season

Appearances and goals by club, season and competition
Club	Season	League			FA Cup		League Cup		Other (Note: Includes EFL Trophy)		Total	
Club	Season	Division	Apps	Goals	Apps	Goals	Apps	Goals	Apps	Goals	Apps	Goals
Aston Villa	2011–12	Premier League	14	0	2	0	0	0	—		16	0
Aston Villa	2012–13	Premier League	2	0	0	0	0	0	—		2	0
Aston Villa	2016–17	Championship	26	1	0	0	1	0	—		27	1
Aston Villa	2017–18	Championship	0	0	0	0	1	0	—		1	0
Aston Villa	Total		42	1	2	0	2	0	—		46	1
Coventry City (loan)	2011–12	Championship	4	1	0	0	0	0	—		4	1
Sheffield Wednesday (loan)	2013–14	Championship	3	0	1	0	0	0	—		4	0
Brighton & Hove Albion (loan)	2014–15	Championship	17	2	0	0	3	0	—		20	2
Nottingham Forest (loan)	2014–15	Championship	18	4	0	0	0	0	—		18	4
Nottingham Forest (loan)	2015–16	Championship	20	2	2	0	0	0	—		22	2
Nottingham Forest (loan)	Total		38	6	2	0	0	0	—		40	6
Barnsley (loan)	2017–18	Championship	29	2	1	0	—		—		30	2
Birmingham City (loan)	2018–19	Championship	40	2	1	0	1	0	—		42	2
Birmingham City	2019–20	Championship	35	4	4	0	0	0	—		39	4
Birmingham City	2020–21	Championship	37	2	0	0	0	0	—		37	2
Birmingham City	2021–22	Championship	35	6	1	0	0	0	—		36	6
Birmingham City	2022–23	Championship	8	0	2	0	0	0	—		10	0
Birmingham City	2023–24	Championship	16	1	2	0	2	0	—		20	1
Birmingham City	Total		171	15	10	0	3	0	—		184	15
Cambridge United	2023–24	League One	0	0	0	0	0	0	0	0	0	0
Career total			304	27	16	0	8	0	0	0	328	27

== Honours ==
Individual

- Birmingham City Players' Player of the Season: 2021–22
