= Luke Maxwell =

English footballer (born 1997)

Personal information
- Full name: Luke Stephen Maxwell
- Date of birth: 6 July 1997 (age 29)
- Place of birth: Kidderminster, England
- Height: 1.88 m (6 ft 2 in)
- Position: Midfielder

Youth career
- 2012–2014: Kidderminster Harriers

Senior career*
Years	Team	Apps	(Gls)
2014–2016	Kidderminster Harriers	30	(0)
2016–2019	Birmingham City	0	(0)
2016	→ Kidderminster Harriers (loan)	15	(2)
2017	→ Grimsby Town (loan)	4	(0)
2017	→ Gateshead (loan)	8	(0)
2018–2019	→ Solihull Moors (loan)	23	(3)
2019–2020	Solihull Moors	12	(0)
2019–2020	→ Gloucester City (loan)	5	(0)
2020–2021	Kidderminster Harriers	0	(0)
- * Club domestic league appearances and goals

Luke Stephen Maxwell (born 6 July 1997) is an English former footballer who played as a midfielder.

Maxwell began his career with Kidderminster Harriers, and was loaned back to that club after signing for Birmingham City of the Championship in January 2016. He spent time on loan at League Two club Grimsby Town, for whom he made his debut in the Football League, and at Gateshead and Solihull Moors of the National League, before joining the latter permanently in January 2019. In 2019–20, he spent time on loan at National League North club Gloucester City before returning to Kidderminster Harriers for the 2020–21 season. He left Kidderminster Harriers at the end of the 2020–21 season to pursue a career outside of football.

== Club career ==
=== Early life and career ===
Maxwell was born in Kidderminster, Worcestershire, where he attended Baxter College. He scored in the final as his under-15 school team won the 2012 Worcestershire Schools County Cup final, a performance that earned them the District Council's award for school team of the year. He began his football career in the academy system at his local club, Kidderminster Harriers, as part of which he completed a BTEC Extended Diploma in Sport at Stourbridge College. He was a member of the Kidderminster under-18 team that reached the third round of the 2014–15 FA Youth Cup, in which they lost 2–1 to Championship club Blackpool's youngsters, and signed his first contract with the club in December 2014. Maxwell made his first-team debut later that month, aged 17 years, 5 months, in the starting eleven for a 1–0 defeat at home to Southport in the Conference. He went on to make a further seven league appearances that season, and also scored in the final of the Worcestershire Senior Cup to help Kidderminster beat Worcester City 2–1.

He became a regular in Kidderminster's first team in 2015–16, and made 22 league appearances in the first half of the season. In January 2016, he signed a three-and-a-half-year contract with Championship club Birmingham City for a fee of £75,000, to be paid in two instalments. As part of the deal, he returned to Kidderminster on a youth loan for the remainder of the season, and made a further 15 appearances, scoring twice – for his first senior goal, "he curled a finely-struck effort" to open the scoring in a 3–2 win against Eastleigh – as his team were unable to avoid relegation. Maxwell's performances for Kidderminster over the season earned him the Players' Player of the Season award. Maxwell returned to Birmingham City in time to be part of the Birmingham reserve team that lost the 2016 Birmingham Senior Cup final to National League North champions Solihull Moors.

=== Football League debut ===
Maxwell appeared for Birmingham's first team in 2016 pre-season, and by the new year was the under-23 team's joint-highest appearance maker, but had not played a competitive first-team match. On 27 January 2017, he joined League Two club Grimsby Town on loan to the end of the season. At the time, he was receiving treatment for a groin injury at his parent club, so did not make his Football League debut until 18 February, as an 83rd-minute substitute in a 3–0 win against Mansfield Town. On 4 May 2017, Maxwell returned to Birmingham prior to the final game of the season from his loan spell at Grimsby.

=== More loans ===
Maxwell joined National League club Gateshead on a three-month loan on 15 September 2017. He finished the spell with eleven appearances, eight in the league and three in the FA Cup.

He joined another National League club, Solihull Moors, in July 2018 on loan until 5 January 2019. He was a first-team regular for the full length of his loan spell, making 23 National League appearances and a further 5 in cup competitions.

=== Solihull Moors ===
When the loan expired, Maxwell signed for Solihull Moors on an 18-month contract with an option of a further year. He made 10 more National League appearances in what remained of the season, and was named Young Player of the Year as Moors finished as National League runners-up.

Maxwell missed the first half of the 2019–20 season with a knee injury. He joined National League North club Gloucester City on 31 December 2019 on loan for a month, made his debut the following day in the starting eleven for a 2–1 win at home to Leamington, and made four more appearances before being recalled by his parent club three days before the loan spell was due to end. He made two substitute appearances before the National League season was suspended and then terminated early because of the COVID-19 pandemic, and was released when his contract expired.

=== Return to Kidderminster ===
In July 2020, Maxwell rejoined Kidderminster Harriers on a one-year contract.

== Honours ==
Solihull Moors

- National League runners-up: 2018–19

Individual

- Solihull Moors Young Player of the Season: 2018-19

== Club statistics ==
As of end of 2019–20 season

Appearances and goals by club, season and competition
Club	Season	League			National Cup		League Cup		Other		Total	
Club	Season	Division	Apps	Goals	Apps	Goals	Apps	Goals	Apps	Goals	Apps	Goals
Kidderminster Harriers	2014–15	Conference Premier	8	0	0	0	—		0	0	8	0
Kidderminster Harriers	2015–16	National League	22	0	1	0	—		1 (Note: Appearance in FA Trophy)	0	24	0
Kidderminster Harriers	Total		30	0	1	0	—		1	0	32	0
Birmingham City	2015–16	Championship	0	0	—		—		—		0	0
Birmingham City	2016–17	Championship	0	0	0	0	0	0	—		0	0
Birmingham City	2017–18	Championship	0	0	0	0	0	0	—		0	0
Birmingham City	2018–19	Championship	—		—		—		—		—	
Birmingham City	Total		0	0	0	0	0	0	—		0	0
Kidderminster Harriers (loan)	2015–16	National League	15	2	—		—				15	2
Grimsby Town (loan)	2016–17	League Two	4	0	—		—		—		4	0
Gateshead (loan)	2017–18	National League	8	0	3	0	—		0	0	11	0
Solihull Moors	2018–19	National League	33	3	4	0	—		4	0	41	3
Solihull Moors	2019–20	National League	2	0	0	0	—		0	0	2	0
Solihull Moors	Total		35	3	4	0	—		4	0	43	3
Gloucester City	2019–20	National League North	5	0	—		—		—		5	0
Kidderminster Harriers	2020–21	National League North	0	0	0	0	—		0	0	0	0
Career total			97	5	8	0	—		5	0	110	5
