= 2020–21 Millwall F.C. season =

Millwall F.C.
2020–21 season
- Owner: Millwall Holdings
- Chairman: John Berylson
- Manager: Gary Rowett
- Stadium: The Den
- Championship: 11th
- FA Cup: Fourth round
- EFL Cup: Third round
- Top goalscorer: League: Jed Wallace (11); All: Jed Wallace (11)
- Highest home attendance: 2,000 vs Derby County; 2,000 vs Queens Park Rangers
- Lowest home attendance: 0 vs multiple teams (due to COVID-19 restrictions)
- Biggest win: 4–1 vs Sheffield Wednesday; 4–1 vs Bristol City
- Biggest defeat: 6–1 vs Coventry City
Home colours	Away colours	Third colours

The 2020–21 season was Millwall's 136th year in existence, 94th consecutive season in the Football League, and 44th in the second tier. Millwall competed in the Championship for the fourth consecutive season and finished in 11th place. They also played in the FA Cup where they reached the fourth round, and the League Cup where they reached the third round. This season marked the first time in Millwall's history that they played more seasons in the second tier (44) than the third tier (43).

== First-team squad ==
As of 18 January 2021

Note: Flags indicate national team as has been defined under FIFA eligibility rules. Players may hold more than one non-FIFA nationality.

No.	Name	Nat.	Position(s)	Date of birth (age)	Apps.	Goals	Year signed	Signed from	Transfer fee
Goalkeepers
1	Frank Fielding	(England)	GK	4 April 1988 (aged 33)	3	0	2019	(England) Bristol City	Free
33	Bartosz Białkowski	(Poland)	GK	6 July 1987 (aged 33)	97	0	2020	(England) Ipswich Town	£350,000
Defenders
3	Murray Wallace	(Scotland)	CB/LB	10 January 1993 (aged 28)	100	5	2018	(England) Scunthorpe United	Undisclosed
4	Shaun Hutchinson	(England)	CB/DM	23 November 1990 (aged 30)	180	13	2016	(England) Fulham	Free
5	Jake Cooper	(England)	CB	3 February 1995 (aged 26)	206	17	2017	(England) Reading	Undisclosed
12	Mahlon Romeo	(Antigua and Barbuda) (England)	RB	19 September 1995 (aged 25)	218	3	2015	(England) Gillingham	Free
14	Scott Malone	(England)	LB/LM	25 March 1991 (aged 30)	114	11	2020	(England) Derby County	Loan
15	Alex Pearce	(Republic of Ireland) (Scotland) (England)	CB	9 November 1988 (aged 32)	72	1	2019	(England) Derby County	Free
17	James Brown	(England)	RB	12 January 1998 (aged 23)	3	0	2016	Academy	Trainee
23	Danny McNamara	(Republic of Ireland) (England)	RB/RM	27 December 1998 (aged 22)	17	0	2018	Academy	Trainee
35	Hayden Muller	(England)	CB	7 February 2002 (aged 19)	4	0	2019	Academy	Trainee
Midfielders
6	Shaun Williams	(Republic of Ireland)	DM/CM/CB	19 October 1986 (aged 34)	295	22	2014	(England) Milton Keynes Dons	Undisclosed
7	Jed Wallace	(England)	RW/AM	26 March 1994 (aged 27)	221	37	2017	(England) Wolverhampton Wanderers	Undisclosed
8	Ben Thompson	(England)	CM	3 October 1995 (aged 25)	170	12	2014	Academy	Trainee
11	Shane Ferguson	(Northern Ireland)	LM/LB	12 July 1991 (aged 29)	217	12	2016	(England) Newcastle United	Undisclosed
16	Maikel Kieftenbeld	(Netherlands)	DM/CM	26 June 1990 (aged 31)	11	0	2021	(England) Birmingham City	Undisclosed
18	Ryan Leonard	(England)	CM/RM/RB	24 May 1992 (aged 29)	89	5	2019	(England) Sheffield United	£1,500,000
19	Ryan Woods	(England)	DM/RM/RB	13 December 1993 (aged 27)	64	0	2020	(England) Stoke City	Loan
21	Connor Mahoney	(England)	LM/RM/AM	12 February 1997 (aged 24)	57	5	2019	(England) Bournemouth	Undisclosed
24	Billy Mitchell	(England)	CM	7 April 2001 (aged 20)	27	1	2019	Academy	Trainee
28	George Evans	(England)	CM/CB	13 December 1994 (aged 26)	19	1	2021	(England) Derby County	Undisclosed
32	Tyler Burey	(England)	AM/CF/LM/RM	9 January 2001 (aged 20)	16	0	2019	(England) AFC Wimbledon	Free
Forwards
9	Tom Bradshaw	(Wales)	CF	27 July 1992 (aged 28)	91	14	2019	(England) Barnsley	£1,250,000
10	Matt Smith	(England)	CF	7 June 1989 (aged 32)	77	19	2019	(England) Queens Park Rangers	Undisclosed
13	Kenneth Zohore	(Denmark)	CF	31 January 1994 (aged 27)	19	3	2020	(England) West Bromwich Albion	Loan
20	Mason Bennett	(England)	LW/RW/CF	15 July 1996 (aged 24)	50	8	2020	(England) Derby County	Undisclosed
22	Jón Daði Böðvarsson	(Iceland)	CF/LW/RW	25 May 1992 (aged 29)	75	7	2019	(England) Reading	Undisclosed

=== Statistics ===
As of 8 May 2021

No.	Pos	Nat	Player	Total		Championship		FA Cup		League Cup	
No.	Pos	Nat	Player	Apps	Goals	Apps	Goals	Apps	Goals	Apps	Goals
1	GK	(England) ENG	Frank Fielding	2	0	0+0	0	2+0	0	0+0	0
3	DF	(Scotland) SCO	Murray Wallace	26	1	20+3	1	0+0	0	3+0	0
4	DF	(England) ENG	Shaun Hutchinson	43	2	39+0	1	1+0	1	3+0	0
5	DF	(England) ENG	Jake Cooper	46	1	42+0	1	2+0	0	2+0	0
6	MF	(Republic of Ireland) IRL	Shaun Williams	28	0	12+14	0	0+0	0	1+1	0
7	MF	(England) ENG	Jed Wallace	47	11	44+1	11	0+0	0	0+2	0
8	MF	(England) ENG	Ben Thompson	33	3	16+13	3	1+1	0	2+0	0
9	FW	(Wales) WAL	Tom Bradshaw	34	4	12+18	4	1+1	0	1+1	0
10	FW	(England) ENG	Matt Smith	34	5	7+22	3	0+2	0	3+0	2
11	MF	(Northern Ireland) NIR	Shane Ferguson	16	0	2+11	0	1+0	0	2+0	0
12	DF	(Antigua and Barbuda) ANT	Mahlon Romeo	38	1	31+5	1	1+0	0	1+0	0
13	FW	(Denmark) DEN	Kenneth Zohore	19	3	10+7	2	2+0	1	0+0	0
14	DF	(England) ENG	Scott Malone	43	6	37+4	5	1+0	0	1+0	1
15	DF	(Republic of Ireland) IRL	Alex Pearce	26	0	20+4	0	2+0	0	0+0	0
16	MF	(Netherlands) NED	Maikel Kieftenbeld	11	0	8+3	0	0+0	0	0+0	0
18	MF	(England) ENG	Ryan Leonard	30	2	24+2	1	2+0	0	2+0	1
19	MF	(England) ENG	Ryan Woods	45	0	38+2	0	1+1	0	2+1	0
20	FW	(England) ENG	Mason Bennett	41	6	29+8	6	1+0	0	1+2	0
21	MF	(England) ENG	Connor Mahoney	17	2	4+10	1	0+0	0	3+0	1
22	FW	(Iceland) ISL	Jón Daði Böðvarsson	40	1	13+25	1	0+1	0	1+0	0
23	DF	(Republic of Ireland) IRL	Danny McNamara	17	0	15+1	0	1+0	0	0+0	0
24	MF	(England) ENG	Billy Mitchell	16	1	10+6	1	0+0	0	0+0	0
28	MF	(England) ENG	George Evans	19	1	19+0	1	0+0	0	0+0	0
32	MF	(England) ENG	Tyler Burey	15	0	0+13	0	1+1	0	0+0	0
33	GK	(Poland) POL	Bartosz Białkowski	49	0	46+0	0	0+0	0	3+0	0
35	DF	(England) ENG	Hayden Muller	3	0	0+2	0	0+0	0	0+1	0
Players who left the club during the season:
25	FW	(Republic of Ireland) IRL	Troy Parrott	14	0	7+4	0	2+0	0	1+0	0
26	MF	(Czech Republic) CZE	Jiří Skalák	5	0	1+2	0	0+1	0	0+1	0

==== Goals record ====
As of 8 May 2021

Rank	No.	Nat.	Po.	Name	Championship	FA Cup	League Cup	Total
1	7	(England)	RM	Jed Wallace	11	0	0	11
2	14	(England)	LB	Scott Malone	5	0	1	6
2	20	(England)	LW	Mason Bennett	6	0	0	6
4	10	(England)	CF	Matt Smith	3	0	2	5
5	9	(Wales)	CF	Tom Bradshaw	4	0	0	4
6	8	(England)	CM	Ben Thompson	3	0	0	3
6	13	(Denmark)	CF	Kenneth Zohore	2	1	0	3
8	4	(England)	CB	Shaun Hutchinson	1	1	0	2
8	18	(England)	CM	Ryan Leonard	1	0	1	1
8	21	(England)	AM	Connor Mahoney	1	0	1	1
11	3	(Scotland)	CB	Murray Wallace	1	0	0	1
11	5	(England)	CB	Jake Cooper	1	0	0	1
11	12	(Antigua and Barbuda)	RB	Mahlon Romeo	1	0	0	1
11	22	(Iceland)	CF	Jón Daði Böðvarsson	1	0	0	1
11	24	(England)	CM	Billy Mitchell	1	0	0	1
11	28	(England)	CB	George Evans	1	0	0	1
Own Goals					4	0	1	5
Total					47	2	4	53

==== Disciplinary record ====
As of 8 May 2021

Rank	No.	Nat.	Po.	Name	Championship			FA Cup			League Cup			Total		
Rank	No.	Nat.	Po.	Name	Booked	(yellow card) (yellow-red card)	Sent off (straight red)	Booked	(yellow card) (yellow-red card)	Sent off (straight red)	Booked	(yellow card) (yellow-red card)	Sent off (straight red)	Booked	(yellow card) (yellow-red card)	Sent off (straight red)
1	19	(England)	CM	Ryan Woods	10	0	0	0	0	0	0	0	0	10	0	0
2	4	(England)	CB	Shaun Hutchinson	6	0	0	0	0	0	0	0	0	6	0	0
2	5	(England)	CB	Jake Cooper	5	0	0	1	0	0	0	0	0	6	0	0
2	18	(England)	CM	Ryan Leonard	6	0	0	0	0	0	0	0	0	6	0	0
5	3	(Scotland)	CB	Murray Wallace	3	1	0	0	0	0	0	0	0	3	1	0
5	23	(Republic of Ireland)	RB	Danny McNamara	5	0	0	0	0	0	0	0	0	5	0	0
7	12	(Antigua and Barbuda)	RB	Mahlon Romeo	4	0	0	0	0	0	0	0	0	4	0	0
7	28	(England)	DM	George Evans	4	0	0	0	0	0	0	0	0	4	0	0
9	6	(Republic of Ireland)	DM	Shaun Williams	3	0	0	0	0	0	0	0	0	3	0	0
9	7	(England)	RM	Jed Wallace	2	0	0	0	0	0	1	0	0	3	0	0
9	14	(England)	LB	Scott Malone	3	0	0	0	0	0	0	0	0	3	0	0
12	16	(Netherlands)	DM	Maikel Kieftenbeld	2	0	0	0	0	0	0	0	0	2	0	0
14	8	(England)	CM	Ben Thompson	1	0	0	0	0	0	0	0	0	1	0	0
14	22	(Iceland)	CF	Jón Daði Böðvarsson	1	0	0	0	0	0	0	0	0	1	0	0
14	24	(England)	CM	Billy Mitchell	1	0	0	0	0	0	0	0	0	1	0	0
14	35	(England)	CB	Hayden Muller	1	0	0	0	0	0	0	0	0	1	0	0
Total					55	1	0	1	0	0	1	0	0	57	1	0

== Transfers ==
=== Transfers in ===
Date	Position	Nationality	Name	To	Fee	Ref.
28 August 2020	SS	(England)	Mason Bennett	(England) Derby County	Undisclosed	
25 January 2021	DM	(Netherlands)	Maikel Kieftenbeld	(England) Birmingham City	Undisclosed	
1 February 2021	DM	(England)	George Evans	(England) Derby County	Undisclosed	

=== Loans in ===
Date from	Position	Nationality	Name	From	Date until	Ref.
27 July 2020	DM	(England)	Ryan Woods	(England) Stoke City	End of season	
1 August 2020	CF	(Republic of Ireland)	Troy Parrott	(England) Tottenham Hotspur	1 February 2021	
28 August 2020	LB	(England)	Scott Malone	(England) Derby County	End of season	
16 October 2020	CF	(Denmark)	Kenneth Zohore	(England) West Bromwich Albion	End of season	

=== Loans out ===
Date from	Position	Nationality	Name	To	Date until	Ref.
14 July 2020	RB	(Republic of Ireland)	Danny McNamara	(Scotland) St Johnstone	4 January 2021	
14 July 2020	CF	(England)	Tanto Olaofe	(Scotland) St Johnstone	End of season	
3 October 2020	DF	(England)	Harry Ransom	(England) Dover Athletic		
9 October 2020	CF	(England)	Isaac Olaofe	(England) Sutton United	9 January 2021	
15 October 2020	MF	(England)	Reuben Duncan	(England) Welling United	12 November 2020	
19 December 2020	DF	(England)	Rob Strachan	(England) Welling United	January 2021	
4 January 2021	RB	(England)	James Brown	(Scotland) St Johnstone	End of season	
8 April 2021	MF	(England)	Sam Skeffington	(England) Barnet	End of season	
15 April 2021	MF	(England)	Alex Mitchell	(England) Bromley	13 May 2021	

=== Transfers out ===
Date	Position	Nationality	Name	To	Fee	Ref.
1 July 2020	CF	(England)	Harvey Bradbury	(England) Oxford City	Released	
1 July 2020	DF	(England)	Jesse Debrah	Unattached	Released	
20 July 2020	LW	(Republic of Ireland)	Aiden O'Brien	(England) Sunderland	Released	
25 August 2020	RB	(England)	Jason McCarthy	(England) Wycombe Wanderers	Undisclosed	
6 February 2021	LW	(Czech Republic)	Jiří Skalák	Mladá Boleslav	Mutual consent	

== Pre-season and friendlies ==
Win Draw Loss Fixtures

29 August 2020 Friendly	Southend United	0–3	Millwall	Southend-on-Sea
14:00 BST		Report	Leonard 6'; Thompson 35'; Parrott 57'	Stadium: Roots Hall; Attendance: 0

1 September 2020 Friendly	Millwall	0–1	Crystal Palace	Bermondsey
14:00 BST		Report	Meyer 28'	Stadium: The Den; Attendance: 0 Referee: Tim Robinson

== Competitions ==
=== Overview ===
Competition	First match	Last match	Starting round	Record							
Competition	First match	Last match	Starting round	Pld	W	D	L	GF	GA	GD	Win %
EFL Championship	11 September 2020	May 2021	Matchday 1	14	4	8	2	12	10	+2	28.57
FA Cup	9 January 2021		Third round	0	0	0	0	0	0	+0	—
EFL Cup	5 September 2020	23 September 2020	First round	3	2	0	1	6	4	+2	66.67
Total				17	6	8	3	18	14	+4	35.29

Last updated: 28 November 2020
Source: Competitions

=== EFL Championship ===
==== League table ====
Pos	Team	Pld	W	D	L	GF	GA	GD	Pts
8	Cardiff City	46	18	14	14	66	49	+17	68
9	Queens Park Rangers	46	19	11	16	57	55	+2	68
10	Middlesbrough	46	18	10	18	55	53	+2	64
11	Millwall	46	15	17	14	47	52	−5	62
12	Luton Town	46	17	11	18	41	52	−11	62
13	Preston North End	46	18	7	21	49	56	−7	61
14	Stoke City	46	15	15	16	50	52	−2	60

Source: EFL Official Website
Rules for classification: 1) Points; 2) Goal difference; 3) Number of goals scored; 4) Head-to-head results; 5) Wins; 6) Away goals; 7) Penalty points (sec 9.5); 8) 12-point sending off offences

==== Results summary ====
Overall								Home						Away					
Pld	W	D	L	GF	GA	GD	Pts	W	D	L	GF	GA	GD	W	D	L	GF	GA	GD
46	15	17	14	47	52	−5	62	7	10	6	24	24	0	8	7	8	23	28	−5

Last updated: 8 May 2021.

==== Results by matchday ====
Matchday	1	2	3	4	5	6	7	8	9	10	11	12	13	14	15	16	17	18	19	20	21	22	23	24	25	26	27	28	29	30	31	32	33	34	35	36	37	38	39	40	41	42	43	44	45	46
Ground	H	A	H	A	A	H	H	A	H	A	A	H	H	A	A	H	H	A	A	H	H	A	A	A	H	A	H	H	A	H	H	A	A	H	H	A	A	H	H	A	H	A	H	A	H	A
Result	D	W	D	L	W	W	D	W	L	D	D	D	D	D	L	L	D	L	W	D	L	D	L	W	D	D	D	W	W	W	D	D	L	W	L	W	L	W	W	W	L	D	L	L	W	L
Position	11	7	9	11	7	6	7	4	7	8	9	9	10	11	13	14	17	17	15	16	17	16	16	16	15	16	14	13	14	11	11	11	12	10	11	10	10	10	10	9	9	9	11	12	11	11

Updated to match(es) played on 8 May 2021. Source:
A = Away; H = Home; W = Win; D = Draw; L = Loss

==== Matches ====
The 2020–21 season fixtures were released on 21 August.

12 September 2020 1	Millwall	0–0	Stoke City	Bermondsey
15:00 BST	Thompson (yellow card) 34'	Report	Brown (yellow card) 90'	Stadium: The Den; Attendance: 0 Referee: Jeremy Simpson

19 September 2020 2	Rotherham United	0–1	Millwall	Rotherham
15:00 BST	Ihiekwe (yellow card) 25'	Report	J. Wallace 50'; Malone (yellow card) 64'; M. Wallace (yellow card) 76'	Stadium: New York Stadium; Attendance: 0 Referee: Leigh Doughty

26 September 2020 3	Millwall	1–1	Brentford	Bermondsey
15:00 BST	J. Wallace 4'; Romeo (yellow card) 18'; Hutchinson (yellow card) 20'; Leonard (yellow card) 64'	Report	Thompson (yellow card) 13'; Toney 21' (pen.)	Stadium: The Den; Attendance: 0 Referee: David Coote

3 October 2020 4	Swansea City	2–1	Millwall	Swansea
15:00 BST	Guehi (yellow card) 27'; Bidwell 46'; Cabango 68'	Report	Bradshaw 51'; Malone (yellow card) 90+3'	Stadium: Liberty Stadium; Attendance: 0 Referee: Stephen Martin

17 October 2020 5	Wycombe Wanderers	1–2	Millwall	High Wycombe
15:00 BST	Kashket 9'; Knight (yellow card) 75'	Report	J. Wallace 48' (pen.); Leonard 63'	Stadium: Adams Park; Attendance: 0 Referee: Andrew Madley

20 October 2020 6	Millwall	2–0	Luton Town	Bermondsey
19:45 BST	Leonard (yellow card) 38'; Cranie 45+3' (o.g.); Woods (yellow card) 60'; Mahoney 79'	Report	Cranie (yellow card) 66'	Stadium: The Den; Attendance: 0 Referee: Tony Harrington

24 October 2020 7	Millwall	1–1	Barnsley	Bermondsey
15:00 BST	Cooper 45+1'	Report	Helik (yellow card) 17'; Mowatt 44'; Brittain (yellow card) 51'	Stadium: The Den; Attendance: 0 Referee: Andy Davies

28 October 2020 8	Preston North End	0–2	Millwall	Preston
19:00 GMT	Johnson (yellow card) 71'; Browne (yellow card) 90+1'	Report	Zohore 54'; J. Wallace 84' (pen.)	Stadium: Deepdale; Attendance: 0 Referee: Darren Bond

31 October 2020 9	Millwall	0–3	Huddersfield Town	Bermondsey
15:00 GMT	Romeo (yellow card) 58'; Leonard (yellow card) 60'	Report	Koroma 18'; Pipa 89'; O'Brien 90+2'	Stadium: The Den; Attendance: 0 Referee: Gavin Ward

3 November 2020 10	Norwich City	0–0	Millwall	Norwich
19:00 GMT		Report	Woods (yellow card) 52'	Stadium: Carrow Road; Attendance: 0 Referee: Tim Robinson

7 November 2020 11	Sheffield Wednesday	0–0	Millwall	Owlerton
15:00 GMT	van Aken (yellow card) 65'; Brown (yellow card) 90+8'	Report		Stadium: Hillsborough; Attendance: 0 Referee: Tony Harrington

21 November 2020 12	Millwall	1–1	Cardiff City	Bermondsey
15:00 GMT	Smith 35'; Woods (yellow card) 72'; Williams (yellow card) 88'; Böðvarsson (yellow card) 90+4'	Report	Moore 79'	Stadium: The Den; Attendance: 0 Referee: Graham Scott

25 November 2020 13	Millwall	1–1	Reading	Bermondsey
19:00 GMT	Cooper (yellow card) 10'; J. Wallace 45+1'; Williams (yellow card) 52'; Hutchinson (yellow card) 70'; Leonard (yellow card) 85'	Report	Semedo (yellow card) 30'; João 53'; Morrison (yellow card) 55'; Ejaria (yellow card) 60'; Holmes (yellow card) 75'	Stadium: The Den; Attendance: 0 Referee: Leigh Doughty

28 November 2020 14	Birmingham City	0–0	Millwall	Bordesley
15:00 GMT	Leko (yellow card) 28'; Šunjić (yellow card) 79'	Report	J. Wallace (yellow card) 21'	Stadium: St Andrew's Stadium; Attendance: 0 Referee: Andy Woolmer

2 December 2020 15	Blackburn Rovers	2–1	Millwall	Blackburn
19:45 GMT	Elliott 25'; Armstrong 90+1'	Report	Williams (yellow card) 19'; Malone 34'; M. Wallace (yellow card) 64'	Stadium: Ewood Park; Attendance: 0 Referee: Michael Salisbury

5 December 2020 16	Millwall	0–1	Derby County	Bermondsey
15:00 GMT		Report	Shinnie (yellow card) 34'; Bielik (yellow card) 58'; Knight 69'; Waghorn (yellow card) 85'; Kazim-Richards (yellow card) 86'; Byrne (yellow card) 87'	Stadium: The Den; Attendance: 2,000; Referee: Darren England

8 December 2020 17	Millwall	1–1	Queens Park Rangers	Bermondsey
19:45 GMT	Böðvarsson 70'	Report	Ball (yellow card) 16'; Chair 53'; Barbet (yellow card) 75'; Bonne (yellow card) 90+1'	Stadium: The Den; Attendance: 2,000; Referee: Jarred Gillett

12 December 2020 18	Middlesbrough	3–0	Millwall	Middlesbrough
15:00 GMT	Watmore 13', 20'; Tavernier 15'; Bola (yellow card) 23'	Report	Hutchinson (yellow card) 58'	Stadium: Riverside Stadium; Attendance: 0 Referee: Darren Bond

15 December 2020 19	Bristol City	0–2	Millwall	Bristol
19:45 GMT	Diédhiou (yellow card) 73' (yellow-red card) 79'; Massengo (yellow card) 85'	Report	Bradshaw 17'; Bennett 68'	Stadium: Ashton Gate; Attendance: 0 Referee: David Webb

26 December 2020 20	Millwall	1–1	Nottingham Forest	Bermondsey
15:00 GMT	Leonard (yellow card) 14'; Romeo (yellow card) 16'; Bradshaw 47'	Report	Cafú (yellow card) 14'; Ribeiro (yellow card) 20'; Sow (yellow card) 28'; Mighten 49'; Ameobi (yellow card) 59'	Stadium: The Den; Attendance: 0 Referee: Oliver Langford

2 January 2021 21	Millwall	1–2	Coventry City	Bermondsey
15:00 GMT	Woods (yellow card) 45+2'; M. Wallace (yellow card) 60' (yellow-red card) 90+3'; J. Wallace 74' (pen.)	Report	Cooper 20' (o.g.); Hamer 26'; Østigård (yellow card) 90+1'	Stadium: The Den; Attendance: 0 Referee: James Linington

12 January 2021 22	Bournemouth	1–1	Millwall	King's Park
19:00 GMT	Solanke 45+1'; Lerma (yellow card) 82'	Report	Cooper (yellow card) 29'; Leonard (yellow card) 69'; Smith 79'	Stadium: Vitality Stadium; Attendance: 0 Referee: Tim Robinson

16 January 2021 23	Nottingham Forest	3–1	Millwall	West Bridgford
15:00 GMT	Ameobi 34', 70'; Yates 83'; Samba (yellow card) 90+3'	Report	Thompson 89'	Stadium: The City Ground; Attendance: 0 Referee: Keith Stroud

20 January 2021 24	Huddersfield Town	0–1	Millwall	Huddersfield
19:00 GMT	Campbell (penalty missed) 15'	Report	Malone 4'; McNamara (yellow card) 69'; Woods (yellow card) 80'	Stadium: The John Smith's Stadium; Attendance: 0 Referee: Peter Bankes

26 January 2021 25	Millwall	0–0	Watford	Bermondsey
19:00 GMT	Kieftenbeld (yellow card) 26'; Cooper (yellow card) 33'	Report	Masina (yellow card) 45+2'; Cleverley (yellow card) 45+3'; Chalobah (yellow card) 56'; Sierralta (yellow card) 74'	Stadium: The Den; Attendance: 0 Referee: Jeremy Simpson

30 January 2021 26	Cardiff City	1–1	Millwall	Cardiff
15:00 GMT	Bennett (yellow card) 69'; Moore 71'; Vaulks (yellow card) 76'; Morrison (yellow card) 84'	Report	Flint 9' (o.g.)	Stadium: Cardiff City Stadium; Attendance: 0 Referee: Matt Donohue

2 February 2021 27	Millwall	0–0	Norwich City	Bermondsey
18:00 GMT	Kieftenbeld (yellow card) 87'	Report	McLean (yellow card) 82'; Aarons (yellow card) 89'	Stadium: The Den; Attendance: 0 Referee: Steve Martin

6 February 2021 28	Millwall	4–1	Sheffield Wednesday	Bermondsey
15:00 GMT	Hutchinson (yellow card) 23'; Zohore 39' (pen.); Malone 68'; Thompson 69'; Bradshaw 90'	Report	Paterson 10'; Urhoghide (yellow card) 84'	Stadium: The Den; Attendance: 0 Referee: Geoff Eltringham

13 February 2021 29	Reading	1–2	Millwall	Reading
15:00 GMT	Semedo 17'	Report	Hutchinson (yellow card) 65'; Smith 76'; Bennett 85'; Wallace (yellow card) 90'	Stadium: The Madejski Stadium; Attendance: 0 Referee: Andy Woolmer

17 February 2021 30	Millwall	2–0	Birmingham City	Bermondsey
19:00 GMT	Wallace 2'; Thompson 75'; Romeo (yellow card) 78'; Woods (yellow card) 79'	Report	Harper (yellow card) 53'; Jutkiewicz (yellow card) 70'	Stadium: The Den; Attendance: 0 Referee: Darren Bond

20 February 2021 31	Millwall	0–0	Wycombe Wanderers	Bermondsey
15:00 GMT	Wallace (yellow card) 26'; Hutchinson (yellow card) 53'	Report	Mehmeti (yellow card) 86'	Stadium: The Den; Attendance: 0 Referee: Jarred Gillett

23 February 2021 32	Luton Town	1–1	Millwall	Luton
19:45 GMT	Tunnicliffe (yellow card) 50'; Adebayo 55'; Sluga (yellow card) 76'	Report	Hutchinson (yellow card) 14'; Evans 90+5'	Stadium: Kenilworth Road; Attendance: 0 Referee: Graham Scott

27 February 2021 33	Barnsley	2–1	Millwall	Barnsley
15:00 GMT	Woodrow 2', (yellow card) 89'; Helik 59'	Report	Bennett 6'; Woods (yellow card) 46'	Stadium: Oakwell Stadium; Attendance: 0 Referee: Leigh Doughty

2 March 2021 34	Millwall	2–1	Preston North End	Bermondsey
19:00 GMT	Malone 39'; Bennett 86'; Evans (yellow card) 90+4'	Report	Evans 12'; Molumby (yellow card) 58'	Stadium: The Den; Attendance: 0 Referee: Keith Stroud

6 March 2021 35	Millwall	0–2	Blackburn Rovers	Bermondsey
15:00 GMT	Woods (yellow card) 43'; Evans (yellow card) 77'	Report	Dack 18'; Gallagher (yellow card) 65', (goal) 75'; Trybull (yellow card) 77'; Kaminski (yellow card) 85'	Stadium: The Den; Attendance: 0 Referee: Matt Donohue

13 March 2021 36	Derby County	0–1	Millwall	Derby
15:00 GMT	Shinnie (yellow card) 84'	Report	Hutchinson 45'; Evans (yellow card) 58'	Stadium: Pride Park Stadium; Attendance: 0 Referee: Darren England

17 March 2021 37	Queens Park Rangers	3–2	Millwall	Shepherd's Bush
19:00 GMT	Austin 51' de Wijs (yellow card) 56', (goal) 86'; Johansen 67', (yellow card) 88'	Report	Wallace 6'; Bennett 39'	Stadium: Kiyan Prince Foundation Stadium; Attendance: 0 Referee: Jarred Gillett

20 March 2021 38	Millwall	1–0	Middlesbrough	Bermondsey
15:00 GMT	Hall 31' (o.g.); McNamara (yellow card) 35'	Report	Bola (yellow card) 20'	Stadium: The Den; Attendance: 0 Referee: James Linington

2 April 2021 39	Millwall	1–0	Rotherham United	Bermondsey
15:00 BST	Wallace 64'; Cooper (yellow card) 75'	Report	Wood (red card) 56'; Smith (penalty missed) 85'; MacDonald (yellow card) 90+2'	Stadium: The Den; Attendance: 0 Referee: John Brooks

5 April 2021 40	Stoke City	1–2	Millwall	Stoke-on-Trent
15:00 BST	Batth (yellow card) 37'; Brown 41'	Report	Wallace 35', (yellow card) 90+4'; Bennett 71'	Stadium: Bet365 Stadium; Attendance: 0 Referee: Gavin Ward

10 April 2021 41	Millwall	0–3	Swansea City	Bermondsey
12:30 BST		Report	Ayew 45+1'; Lowe 76', 85'	Stadium: The Den; Attendance: 0 Referee: Robert Jones

17 April 2021 42	Brentford	0–0	Millwall	Brentford
12:30 BST	Fosu (yellow card) 48'	Report	Evans (yellow card) 36'	Stadium: Brentford Community Stadium; Attendance: 0 Referee: Darren Bond

21 April 2021 43	Millwall	1–4	Bournemouth	Bermondsey
18:00 BST	Malone (yellow card) 46'; Wallace 49'; Cooper (yellow card) 65'; McNamara (yellow card) 80'	Report	Billing 16', (yellow card) 80'; Danjuma 27'; Brooks 44'; Solanke 67'	Stadium: The Den; Attendance: 0 Referee: Keith Stroud

24 April 2021 44	Watford	1–0	Millwall	Watford
15:00 BST	Sarr 11'	Report	Muller (yellow card) 86'	Stadium: Vicarage Road; Attendance: 0 Referee: Dean Whitestone

1 May 2021 45	Millwall	4–1	Bristol City	Bermondsey
15:00 BST	Wallace 5'; Malone 31'; Mitchell (yellow card) 45', (goal) 52'; Bradshaw 58'; McNamara (yellow card) 68'	Report	Conway 16'; Baker (yellow card) 73'	Stadium: The Den; Attendance: 0 Referee: Josh Smith

8 May 2021 46	Coventry City	6–1	Millwall	Bordesley
12:30 BST	Shipley 16'; McFadzean 45+1', (yellow card) 81'; Hyam 59'; O'Hare 62'; James 67'; Walker 84'	Report	McNamara (yellow card) 6'; Evans (yellow card) 45+2'; McFadzean 54' (o.g.); Woods (yellow card) 69'	Stadium: St Andrew's Stadium; Attendance: 0 Referee: Michael Salisbury

=== FA Cup ===
The third round draw was made on 30 November, with Premier League and EFL Championship clubs all entering the competition. The draw for the fourth and fifth round were made on 11 January, conducted by Peter Crouch.

9 January 2021 Third round	Boreham Wood	0–2	Millwall	Borehamwood
12:00 GMT	Fyfield (yellow card) 24'; Ilesanmi (yellow card) 57'; McDonnell (yellow card) 89'	Report	Cooper (yellow card) 1'; Zohore 31'; Hutchinson 74'	Stadium: Meadow Park; Attendance: 0 Referee: Ben Speedie

23 January 2021 Fourth round	Millwall	0–3	Bristol City	Bermondsey
15:00 GMT		Report	Diédhiou 32' (pen.); Wells 58'; Semenyo 72'	Stadium: The Den; Attendance: 0 Referee: Tony Harrington

=== EFL Cup ===
The first round draw was made on 18 August, live on Sky Sports, by Paul Merson. The draw for both the second and third round were confirmed on September 6, live on Sky Sports by Phil Babb.

5 September 2020 First round	Crawley Town	1–3	Millwall	Crawley
13:00 BST	Ashford 33'	Report	Malone 14'; Tunnicliffe 31' (o.g.); Smith 59'; J. Wallace (yellow card) 66'	Stadium: The People's Pension Stadium; Attendance: 0 Referee: David Rock

15 September 2020 Second round	Millwall	3–1	Cheltenham Town	Bermondsey
18:00 BST	Leonard 19'; Mahoney 49'; Smith 62'	Report	Boyle (yellow card) 17'; Azaz 69'	Stadium: The Den; Attendance: 0 Referee: John Busby

23 September 2020 Third round	Millwall	0–2	Burnley	Bermondsey
19:00 BST		Report	Brownhill 45', (yellow card) 53'; Thomas (yellow card) 56'; Westwood (yellow card) 78'; Vydra 90+3'	Stadium: The Den; Attendance: 0 Referee: Andy Davies
