= Professional Football Compensation Committee =

- Location: England
- Members: The Premier League, The Football League, Professional Footballers' Association, League Managers' Association

The Professional Football Compensation Committee (PFCC) is an English association football committee that determines the amount of compensation a football club should receive when a player contracted to that club is expected to join another English club.

It consists of an independent Chairman and members appointed by the Premier League and The Football League (as applicable), the Professional Footballers' Association and the League Managers' Association.

The regulations set out that the following cost can be included in determining compensation:

- Any cost incurred by either Club in operating a Football Academy or Centre of Excellence including (without limitation) the cost of providing for players attending thereat:
- Living accommodation;
- Training and playing facilities;
- Scouting, coaching, administrative and other staff;
- Education and welfare requirements;
- Playing and training strip and other clothing;
- Medical and first aid facilities;
- Friendly and competitive matches and overseas tours;
- Any other cost incurred by either Club directly or indirectly attributable to the training and development of players including any fee referred to in Regulation.
