= Joshua Bradley-Hurst =

Scottish-Sri Lankan footballer

Personal information
- Date of birth: 10 January 2002 (age 24)
- Place of birth: Colombo, Sri Lanka
- Position: Goalkeeper

Youth career
- 2013–2018: Celtic
- 2018–2020: Birmingham City

Senior career*
Years	Team	Apps	(Gls)
2019–2020	Birmingham City	0	(0)
2019	→ Gloucester City (loan)	6	(0)
2019	→ Hungerford Town (loan)	3	(0)
2021	Dumbarton	0	(0)
2021–2023	Clyde	6	(0)
2022	→ Clydebank (loan)	4	(0)

International career
2017–2018	Scotland U16	2	(0)
- * Club domestic league appearances and goals as of 6 May 2023

Joshua Bradley-Hurst (born 10 January 2002) is a footballer who plays as a goalkeeper. Born in Sri Lanka, he has represented Scotland at youth international level.

== International career ==
Bradley-Hurst is eligible to play for Sri Lanka, England and Scotland in international football. In 2017, he made his debut for Scotland under-16 team.

In September 2022, Bradley-Hurst received his first call-up from Sri Lanka national team to take part in a training camp.

== Personal life ==
Bradley-Hurst was born in Sri Lanka to an English father and a Scottish mother. He moved to Scotland at the age of six.
