= 2018–19 Birmingham City F.C. season =

Birmingham City F.C.
2018–19 season
- Owner: Trillion Trophy Asia
- Manager: Garry Monk; (to 18 June 2019); Pep Clotet (caretaker)
- Stadium: St Andrew's
- EFL Championship: 17th
- FA Cup: Third round
- EFL Cup: First round
- Top goalscorer: League: Che Adams (22); All: Che Adams (22)
- Highest home attendance: 26,631 (vs Aston Villa, 10 March 2019)
- Lowest home attendance: 19,795 (vs Rotherham United, 6 October 2018)
- Average home league attendance: 22,483
Home colours	Away colours

The 2018–19 season is Birmingham City Football Club's 116th season in the English football league system and eighth consecutive season in the second-tier Championship. Under the management of Garry Monk, they began the season under transfer restrictions imposed by the English Football League (EFL) for breaches of their Profitability and Sustainability Regulations, and finished it in 17th place after a nine-point deduction was also imposed. The deduction put paid to hopes of promotion via the play-offs, but the team were able to avoid relegation with two matches still to play. As with all League clubs, the first team competed in the FA Cup and EFL Cup; they lost their first match in both competitions, to West Ham United in the former and to Reading in the latter.

After conflict with the board over transfer policy and other issues, Monk was sacked on 18 June 2019. His assistant, Pep Clotet, was named caretaker head coach.

Twenty-six players made at least one appearance in first-team competition, of whom three were loan signings; there were fourteen different goalscorers. Che Adams, who appeared in all 48 of Birmingham's first-team matches, top scored with 22 goals, all of which came in league matches. The average league attendance, of 22,483, was nearly 7% up on 2017–18.

The season covers the period from 1 July 2018 to 30 June 2019.

== Overview ==
After a 2016–17 season in which the club had three different managers and avoided relegation on the final day, Birmingham repeated the process in 2017–18. Garry Monk, appointed in March, vowed to change the pattern: he would be "relentless, and whoever is not on board with that won't be here. The ones who are will be here. It has to be like that. We have to raise the mentality of the club. That goes for everyone at the club." Apart from assistant manager Pep Clotet, the remainder of his backroom staff, including first-team coach James Beattie and goalkeeping coach Darryl Flahavan, were those he had worked with before Middlesbrough sacked him some months earlier. That club had then placed his staff on gardening leave and included a clause preventing their working together or with Monk for a rival club for the next 12 months. After they joined Monk at Birmingham, Middlesbrough sought an injunction to enforce that clause, but the matter was settled out of court after a counter-claim for damages.

For sponsorship reasons, and in the light of the EFL's Profit and Sustainability (P&S) Regulations, the club's owners agreed a three-year naming rights package under which St Andrew's was renamed St Andrew's Trillion Trophy Stadium and the Wast Hills training ground became the Trillion Trophy Training Centre. It emerged in early July that the EFL had refused to register Birmingham's first signing of the summer window – Danish left-back Kristian Pedersen – because of failure to comply with P&S requirements and had placed the club under a transfer embargo. On 30 July, BBC Sport quoted an EFL spokesperson confirming they had "been in regular contact with the club throughout the summer and set out on 13 July [their] requirements in respect of the basis upon which the club would be able to make additions to Garry Monk's squad." The club then issued a statement expressing their disappointment with the continuing embargo despite their best efforts to comply, and their understanding of and empathy with supporters' frustrations.

However, "after consideration of the legal position as between the Club, Player and the EFL" and despite the EFL being "exceptionally disappointed" at the club's attitude, a deal was reached. The club agreed to a business plan aimed at restricting expenditure, Pedersen was registered, and the club could make a further five signings under strict conditions, interpreted by the Birmingham Mail as meaning loans and free transfers only and a salary cap pitched at a "debilitating" level. The club faced further punishment, including possible points deductions, from an EFL commission to meet later in the year.

Birmingham made four signings in the summer transfer window: three loans – winger Connor Mahoney from AFC Bournemouth, striker Omar Bogle from Cardiff City, and midfielder Gary Gardner – younger brother of Craig Gardner – from Aston Villa, and one free transfer, goalkeeper Lee Camp, also from Cardiff City. They cancelled Diego Fabbrini's contract, loaned out Nicolai Brock-Madsen, Jonathan Grounds, Cheick Keita, Cheikh Ndoye and Greg Stewart, and tried unsuccessfully to offload high-earning goalkeepers David Stockdale and Tomasz Kuszczak.

In the January transfer window, Birmingham made the last of their five permitted signings, Swedish international midfielder or forward Kerim Mrabti, whose contract with Djurgården had expired. Bogle was recalled by his parent club, fringe players Luke Maxwell and Dan Scarr moved on, Viv Solomon-Otabor and Steve Seddon loaned out, and Stewart was recalled from Kilmarnock and loaned to Aberdeen instead. There was considerable interest from Premier League clubs in newly prolific striker Che Adams, but Birmingham did not want to sell, and no offer received was considered enough to force their hand given that the player could neither be replaced nor loaned back because of the signing restriction. A bid of £12 million from Burnley was the highest reported. The Times suggested that a refusal to sell might constitute a further aggravated breach of the P&S rules. It also emerged that the restriction also applied to extending the contracts of existing players, which had particular relevance to team captain Michael Morrison whose contract was due to expire at the end of the season.

The EFL hearing, originally scheduled for February 2019, was postponed to mid-March after a panel member recused themselves, "with the intention of the Disciplinary Commission delivering the outcome quickly so the matter can be fully resolved before the end of this season." The panel finally sat on 18 March, and ruled that nine points be deducted in the current season; neither party took up their right to appeal.

According to the Birmingham Mail, Monk turned the team into "a side vastly superior than the sum of its parts" to keep them in the top half of the table until a run of losses in March and a nine-point deduction led to a 17th-place finish. In June, it was reported that the relationship between Monk and chief executive Xuandong Ren had broken down. After making it clear he would not resign, Monk was sacked on 18 June. According to Ren in an interview with The Times, Monk was sacked because of "his attempt to use a single agent in transfer deals and his refusal to adapt the team's style of play"; "sources close to Monk" disagreed, and "suggested that Ren's comments were designed to explain the surprise sacking ... that has been badly received by many Birmingham fans." A club statement with echoes of Monk's own of a year earlier called for a change in footballing philosophy and stressed the vital importance of "everybody at the club to be sharing the same vision and commitment to the plans and processes." Despite the club's statement that they were not actively looking for a new permanent manager, Pep Clotet was appointed caretaker head coach, the remainder of the backroom staff stayed in post, and Craig Gardner was given a role as player-coach.

== Pre-season ==
The home kit consists of a blue shirt with white trim on the shoulders and upper chest and white stripes down the side seams, white shorts with blue trim and blue stripes down the side seams, and blue socks with white trim at the turnover. The away kit has a yellow shirt with three blue stripes on the shoulders, blue shorts with yellow stripes down the side seams, and yellow socks with blue trim. The kits are supplied by Adidas and bear the logo of the club's principal sponsor, online bookmaker 888sport.

After a training camp based in Bad Häring, Austria, which included friendly matches against Akhmat Grozny of the Russian Premier League and German fourth-tier club SSV Ulm, Birmingham City's first-team pre-season programme continued with matches against Doncaster Rovers, Cheltenham Town, Las Palmas and Brighton & Hove Albion.

Pre-season match details
Date	Opponents	Venue	Result	Score F–A	Scorers	Attendance	Refs
12 July 2018	Akhmat Grozny	N	L	0–1			
14 July 2018	SSV Ulm	N	D	1–1	Jota 61'		
20 July 2018	Doncaster Rovers	N	W	1–0	Adams 87'		
21 July 2018	Cheltenham Town	A	W	3–0	Lakin 26', Lubala 52', Ndoye 89' pen.	2,234	
27 July 2018	Las Palmas	N	L	1–4	Scarr 45'		
28 July 2018	Brighton & Hove Albion	H	D	1–1	Kieftenbeld 31'	3,434	

== EFL Championship ==
=== August–September ===
Birmingham City opened their 2018–19 EFL Championship season at home to Norwich City, without midfielder David Davis and forward Isaac Vassell, both injured, as well as a number of out-of-favour players including both senior goalkeepers, David Stockdale and Tomasz Kuszczak. The team lined up in a 4–4–2 formation with debutant Connal Trueman in goal, Maxime Colin and new signing Kristian Pedersen at full back, Michael Morrison (captain) and Harlee Dean at centre back, Maikel Kieftenbeld alongside Craig Gardner in central midfield, Jota and Jacques Maghoma as wide midfielders, and Che Adams and Lukas Jutkiewicz in the forward line. Birmingham led for much of the second half, but late in stoppage time, Onel Hernández equalised for the visitors.

It was the first of a string of matches in which Birmingham either under-performed, as in the 1–0 defeat at Middlesbrough or the goalless draw with Queens Park Rangers when they had only one shot on target, or were unable to take advantage of their chances, as in the goalless draws with Swansea City and Sheffield United, a missed penalty against West Bromwich Albion, and the visit to Nottingham Forest when they let slip a two-goal lead. In what remained of August, Birmingham brought in four players: Lee Camp took over from Trueman in goal from the third match of the season and Gary Gardner replaced his brother in central midfield, while forward Omar Bogle and winger Connor Mahoney joined the first-team squad.

Their first win finally arrived on 22 September, away to Leeds United, unbeaten and top of the table, courtesy of Adams' sharpness and what Leeds' manager Marcelo Bielsa claimed as a "tactical error" on his part. After conceding what Monk described as two poor goals stemming from two mistakes, Jutkiewicz scored twice in the second half to secure a draw at home to Ipswich Town and finish September in 16th place.

=== October–November ===
Birmingham began October with their eighth draw in eleven league matches, away to Brentford, despite Kieftenbeld's second-half red card for an off-the-ball incident involving opponent Neal Maupay. Garry Monk was also sent to the stands for his verbal reaction to the dismissal: he said afterwards that he was expecting Maupay to be booked for feigning injury. Kieftenbeld's sending off was rescinded on appeal, so he was available for the next match, against Rotherham United, in which Jutkiewicz scored his first Birmingham hat-trick. Jutkiewicz continued with goals against Reading and Sheffield Wednesday and an assist for Adams' winning goal at Stoke City in a run of four wins that earned him the Championship Player of the Month award for October and earned Monk a nomination as Championship Manager of the Month as the team rose to ninth place in the table.

In three consecutive matches, Birmingham scored first and failed to win. Away defeats against Derby County and Aston Villa, in which Jutkiewicz reached double figures, came either side of a home match in which Adams took advantage of defensive errors to put his side 2–0 ahead and Hull City scored three times in 14 minutes before Adams completed his hat-trick to level the scores. Having conceded ten goals in those three matches, Monk wanted his players to "get back to that toughness" that earned them their eleven-match unbeaten run. They finished November with a clean sheet in a 2–0 win at Millwall that left them in tenth place.

=== December–February ===
A rare goal from Kieftenbeld opened Birmingham's scoring in December: seconds after half-time, Preston North End's goalkeeper Declan Rudd misjudged an overhit pass, the ball went through his legs and into the net. That win was followed by a first home defeat since March, inflicted by Bristol City. The year ended with two draws and two wins, Adams took his goals total into double figures, the largest crowd of the season thus far, of 26,344, saw Birmingham complete a double over their former manager Gary Rowett's Stoke City via Omar Bogle's fine individual goal – the only one he scored for the club before his loan ended early – and the team reached seventh place.

Two defeats and a draw preceded the visit to Swansea City, the club where Monk had spent much of his career as player and then manager. Pedersen was sent off before half-time, but Birmingham came back from 2–1 behind to tie the scores, and then took a 71st-minute lead when Adams "whipped in an excellent curling shot from 20 yards (18 m)" that was to win the club's Goal of the Season award. In the fourth minute of stoppage time, Oli McBurnie equalised; the draw left Birmingham in twelfth position. Adams scored in all four January matches, to take his total to 15 for the season.

Adams continued the run with four goals in the first two matches of February, a penalty against Nottingham Forest and a hat-trick at Queens Park Rangers in which Birmingham took a 4–0 first-half lead before conceding three goals and relying on Camp saving a stoppage-time penalty to hold on to the win. An unexpected home defeat to Bolton Wanderers was followed by a 2–2 draw with Blackburn Rovers in which Adams took his total for the season past 20; he was named Championship Player of the Month. February ended with Birmingham in 8th place after a win away to Bristol City.

=== March–May ===
With the EFL hearing delayed until mid-March, Birmingham failed to score a goal or gain a point from the first four fixtures of that month. The eventual nine-point deduction was announced on 22 March, a week before the visit to local rivals West Bromwich Albion, where they twice took the lead before the hosts equalised via a penalty awarded for a foul outside the penalty area and then went on to win 3–2. The result left Birmingham in 17th position, five points above the relegation places having played more matches than the teams below them.

They went through the remaining seven fixtures unbeaten. Adams' 22nd and last goal of the season completed a double over Leeds United, the return to goalscoring form of Jutkiewicz and Morrison earned points against Sheffield United, Ipswich Town and Derby County, and a comfortable win against Rotherham United confirmed their Championship status for next season with two matches still to play. They finished 17th, twelve points above the relegation places.

=== Match results ===
General source: Match content not verifiable from these sources is referenced individually.

Date	League position	Opponents	Venue	Result	Score F–A	Scorers	Attendance	Refs
4 August 2018	7th	Norwich City	H	D	2–2	Maghoma 56', Solomon-Otabor 89'	22,677	
11 August 2018	19th	Middlesbrough	A	L	0–1		23,748	
17 August 2018	17th	Swansea City	H	D	0–0		20,083	
22 August 2018	20th	Bolton Wanderers	A	L	0–1		13,821	
25 August 2018	20th	Nottingham Forest	A	D	2–2	Jutkiewicz 21', Adams 72'	26,799	
1 September 2018	19th	Queens Park Rangers	H	D	0–0		21,155	
14 September 2018	17th	West Bromwich Albion	H	D	1–1	Jota 26'	22,715	
19 September 2018	20th	Sheffield United	A	D	0–0		23,525	
22 September 2018	17th	Leeds United	A	W	2–1	Adams 8', 29'	34,800	
29 September 2018	16th	Ipswich Town	H	D	2–2	Jutkiewicz 48', 68'	21,612	
2 October 2018	18th	Brentford	A	D	1–1	Morrison 26'	9,715	
6 October 2018	17th	Rotherham United	H	W	3–1	Jutkiewicz 20', 23', 68'	19,795	
20 October 2018	14th	Stoke City	A	W	1–0	Adams 81'	28,160	
23 October 2018	9th	Reading	H	W	2–1	G. Gardner 49', Jutkiewicz 70'	22,126	
27 October 2018	9th	Sheffield Wednesday	H	W	3–1	Mahoney 43', Jutkiewicz 80', Adams 84'	23,659	
3 November 2018	10th	Derby County	A	L	1–3	Jutkiewicz 10'	28,114	
10 November 2018	12th	Hull City	H	D	3–3	Adams 21', 45+4', 84'	21,468	
25 November 2018	12th	Aston Villa	A	L	2–4	Jutkiewicz 28', Pedersen 57'	41,200	
28 November 2018	10th	Millwall	A	W	2–0	Meredith 11' (o.g.), Morrison 76'	11,644	
1 December 2018	9th	Preston North End	H	W	3–0	Kieftenbeld 46', Maghoma 61', Adams 77'	20,523	
8 December 2018	9th	Bristol City	H	L	0–1		20,961	
15 December 2018	10th	Blackburn Rovers	A	D	2–2	C. Gardner 78' (pen.), Adams 80'	13,622	
22 December 2018	8th	Wigan Athletic	A	W	3–0	Adams 26', Morrison 45+1', Maghoma 61'	13,774	
26 December 2018	7th	Stoke City	H	W	2–0	Maghoma 43', Bogle 87'	26,344	
29 December 2018	7th	Brentford	H	D	0–0		23,909	
1 January 2019	8th	Sheffield Wednesday	A	D	1–1	Adams 48'	29,462	
12 January 2019	8th	Middlesbrough	H	L	1–2	Adams 79'	21,420	
18 January 2019	9th	Norwich City	A	L	1–3	Adams 14'	25,932	
29 January 2019	12th	Swansea City	A	D	3–3	Maghoma 35', Morrison 67', Adams 71'	18,194	
2 February 2019	8th	Nottingham Forest	H	W	2–0	Jota 13', Adams 90+3' (pen.)	24,235	
9 February 2019	8th	Queens Park Rangers	A	W	4–3	Adams 21', 26', 42', Dean 36'	14,234	
12 February 2019	8th	Bolton Wanderers	H	L	0–1		21,682	
23 February 2019	8th	Blackburn Rovers	H	D	2–2	Adams 16', 85'	21,869	
26 February 2019	8th	Bristol City	A	W	2–1	Mahoney 42', Morrison 47'	19,777	
2 March 2019	8th	Hull City	A	L	0–2		12,551	
10 March 2019	10th	Aston Villa	H	L	0–1		26,631	
13 March 2019	12th	Millwall	H	L	0–2		20,151	
16 March 2019	13th	Preston North End	A	L	0–1		17,509	
29 March 2019	18th	West Bromwich Albion	A	L	2–3	G. Gardner 7', Jutkiewicz 59'	24,789	
7 April 2019	17th	Leeds United	H	W	1–0	Adams 29'	24,197	
10 April 2019	17th	Sheffield United	H	D	1–1	Morrison 42'	22,351	
13 April 2019	18th	Ipswich Town	A	D	1–1	Jutkiewicz 7'	17,248	
19 April 2019	18th	Derby County	H	D	2–2	Jutkiewicz 2', Morrison 18'	23,902	
22 April 2019	17th	Rotherham United	A	W	3–1	Maghoma 56', Jota 63', Mrabti 90+3'	10,703	
27 April 2019	17th	Wigan Athletic	H	D	1–1	Jutkiewicz 2'	23,645	
5 May 2019	17th	Reading	A	D	0–0		17,247	

=== League table ===
Pos	Team	Pld	W	D	L	GF	GA	GD	Pts
14	Preston North End	46	16	13	17	67	67	0	61
15	Blackburn Rovers	46	16	12	18	64	69	−5	60
16	Stoke City	46	11	22	13	45	52	−7	55
17	Birmingham City	46	14	19	13	64	58	+6	52 (Note: Birmingham City were deducted 9 points for failure to comply with the EFL profitability and sustainability rules.)
18	Wigan Athletic	46	13	13	20	51	64	−13	52
19	Queens Park Rangers	46	14	9	23	53	71	−18	51
20	Reading	46	10	17	19	49	66	−17	47

Rules for classification: 1) Points; 2) Goal difference; 3) Number of goals scored; 4) Head-to-head results

=== Result summary ===
Overall								Home						Away					
Pld	W	D	L	GF	GA	GD	Pts	W	D	L	GF	GA	GD	W	D	L	GF	GA	GD
46	14	19	13	64	58	+6	52^{(Note: Deducted 9 points for breaches of the EFL's profitability and sustainability rules.)}	7	11	5	31	24	+7	7	8	8	33	34	−1

== FA Cup ==
As with all teams in the top two tiers of English football, Birmingham City entered the FA Cup in the third round. They were drawn to play Premier League club West Ham United at the London Stadium. Marko Arnautović gave West Ham an early lead, but in a "robust and open encounter" Birmingham missed several chances to equalise, and substitute Andy Carroll doubled the lead in stoppage time.

FA Cup match details
Round	Date	Opponents	Venue	Result	Score F–A	Scorers	Attendance	Refs
Third round	5 January 2019	West Ham United	A	L	0–2		54,840	

== EFL Cup ==
In the first round of the EFL Cup, Birmingham were drawn away to another Championship team, Reading. With a televised Championship fixture three days later, Monk made eleven changes from the team that started the previous Saturday, with debuts for Lee Camp, Dan Scarr and Gary Gardner and first starts for Connor Mahoney, Beryly Lubala and Omar Bogle. Reading fielded a full-strength side and were rarely tested.

EFL Cup match details
Round	Date	Opponents	Venue	Result	Score F–A	Scorers	Attendance	Refs
First round	14 August 2018	Reading	A	L	0–2		6,934	

== Transfers ==
=== In ===
Date	Player	Club†	Fee	Refs
25 June 2018	Kristian Pedersen	Union Berlin	Undisclosed	
8 August 2018	Lee Camp	Cardiff City	Free	
15 August 2018	Francis Amartey	FAB Academy		(Note: Player signed specifically for the U23 team under the club's transfer restrictions.)
15 August 2018	Danny Lupano	Solihull Moors		
15 August 2018	Michael Luyambula	(Borussia Dortmund)	Free	
15 August 2018	Cameron McGilp	(Melbourne Victory)	Free	
18 January 2019	Kerim Mrabti	(Djurgården)	Free	

† Brackets round a club's name indicate the player's contract with that club had expired before he joined Birmingham.

=== Out ===
Date	Player	Club†	Fee	Refs
3 September 2018	Diego Fabbrini	(FC Botoșani)	Mutual consent	
1 January 2019	Nicolai Brock-Madsen	(AC Horsens)	Mutual consent	
8 January 2019	Luke Maxwell	Solihull Moors	Undisclosed	
10 January 2019	Ronan Hale	(Crusaders)	Mutual consent	
14 January 2019	Francis Amartey	(Slough Town)	Released	
14 January 2019	Dan Scarr	Walsall	Undisclosed	
31 January 2019	Cameron McGilp	Swindon Town	Undisclosed	
5 June 2019	Jota	Aston Villa	Undisclosed	
13 June 2019	Greg Stewart	(Rangers)	Released	
21 June 2019	Bez Lubala	Crawley Town	Undisclosed sell-on clause	
30 June 2019	Tommy Anderson		Released	
30 June 2019	Dom Bernard	(Forest Green Rovers)	Released	
30 June 2019	Leo Brown	(Ballymena United)	Released	
30 June 2019	Kieran Dawes	(Coleshill Town)	Released	
30 June 2019	Tomasz Kuszczak		Released	
30 June 2019	Lewis Landers	(Cambridge City)	Released at end of scholarship	
30 June 2019	Josh Martin	(Hungerford Town)	Released	
30 June 2019	Christ Mayuba		Released at end of scholarship	
30 June 2019	Kyle McFarlane	(York City)	Released	
30 June 2019	Ben McLean	(Redditch United)	Released at end of scholarship	
30 June 2019	Ryan Moore	(Redditch United)	Released at end of scholarship	
30 June 2019	Michael Morrison	(Reading)	Contract expired	
30 June 2019	Cheikh Ndoye	(Red Star)	Released	
30 June 2019	Nick Okoro		Released at end of scholarship	
30 June 2019	Viv Solomon-Otabor	(CSKA Sofia)	Contract expired	

† Brackets round a club's name denote the player joined that club after his Birmingham City contract expired.

=== Loan in ===
Date	Player	Club	Return	Refs
7 August 2018	Connor Mahoney	AFC Bournemouth	End of season	
7 August 2018	Omar Bogle	Cardiff City	Recalled 28 January 2019	
9 August 2018	Gary Gardner	Aston Villa	End of season	

=== Loan out ===
Date	Player	Club	Return	Refs
3 January 2018 (Note: Hale was loaned to Derry City in January 2018 with initial expiry date of 30 June; the loan was then extended to the end of that club's season.)	Ronan Hale	Derry City	5 November 2018	
28 June 2018	Cheick Keita	Eupen	End of season	
2 July 2018	Luke Maxwell	Solihull Moors	5 January 2019	
24 July 2018	Dom Bernard	Aldershot Town	30 April 2019	
26 July 2018	Leo Brown	Sutton Coldfield Town	End of August	
26 July 2018	Jack Concannon	Sutton Coldfield Town	End of August	
26 July 2018	Kieron Dawes	Sutton Coldfield Town	End of August	
9 August 2018	Nicolai Brock-Madsen	St Mirren	1 January 2019 (Note: Brock-Madsen was loaned to St Mirren until 1 January 2019. After he was told he was not in the plans of the club's new manager, he returned to Birmingham in mid-October to train, but would not be eligible to play for them until the loan expired. Birmingham later confirmed that he would be released on that date.)	
13 August 2018	Jonathan Grounds	Bolton Wanderers	End of season	
16 August 2018	Cheikh Ndoye	Angers	End of season	
17 August 2018	Corey O'Keeffe	Solihull Moors	Recalled 24 December 2018	
28 August 2018	Greg Stewart	Kilmarnock	Recalled 13 January 2019	
30 August 2018	Steve Seddon	Stevenage	15 January 2019	
8 September 2018	David Stockdale	Southend United	28 September 2018	
21 September 2018	Ben McLean	AFC Totton	22 December 2018	
21 September 2018	Adam Siviter	AFC Totton	22 December 2018	
28 September 2018	Jake Weaver	Hungerford Town	28 December 2018	
5 October 2018	Michael Luyambula	Hungerford Town	1 November 2018	
26 October 2018	Francis Amartey	Sutton Coldfield Town	18 December 2018	
26 October 2018	Josh Martin	Hungerford Town	24 April 2019	
9 November 2018	Odin Bailey	Gloucester City	9 January 2019	
22 November 2018	David Stockdale	Wycombe Wanderers	29 November 2018	
6 December 2018	Tommy Anderson	Hungerford Town	7 February 2019	
6 December 2018	Kieron Dawes	Hednesford Town	One month	
13 December 2018	Jack Concannon	Tamworth	Mid-February 2019	
18 December 2018	Michael Luyambula	Hungerford Town	13 January 2019	
24 December 2018	Adam Siviter	Stafford Rangers	27 April 2019	
4 January 2019	Kyle McFarlane	Barrow	4 February 2019	
16 January 2019	Steve Seddon	AFC Wimbledon	End of season	
18 January 2019	Greg Stewart	Aberdeen	End of season	
25 January 2019	Jake Weaver	Kidderminster Harriers	25 February 2019	
31 January 2019	Viv Solomon-Otabor	Portsmouth	End of season	
8 February 2019	David Stockdale	Coventry City	22 February 2019	
26 March 2019	Jake Weaver	Hednesford Town	End of season	

== Appearances and goals ==
Numbers in parentheses denote appearances made as a substitute.
Players marked † left the club during the playing season.
Players with names in italics and marked * were on loan from another club for the whole of their season with Birmingham.
Players listed with no appearances have been in the matchday squad but only as unused substitutes.
Key to positions: GK – Goalkeeper; DF – Defender; MF – Midfielder; FW – Forward

Players' appearances and goals by competition
No.	Pos.	Nat.	Name	League		FA Cup		EFL Cup		Total		Discipline	
No.	Pos.	Nat.	Name	Apps	Goals	Apps	Goals	Apps	Goals	Apps	Goals	A yellow rectangle, denoting the yellow penalty card shown to a player being cautioned	A red rectangle, denoting the red penalty card shown to a player being sent off
1	GK	NIR	Lee Camp	44	0	1	0	1	0	46	0	1	0
3	DF	DEN	Kristian Pedersen	39	1	0	0	0	0	39	1	8	1
4	DF	ENG	Marc Roberts	3 (5)	0	0	0	1	0	4 (5)	0	2	0
5	DF	FRA	Maxime Colin	43	0	1	0	0	0	44	0	3	0
6	MF	NED	Maikel Kieftenbeld	34 (2)	1	1	0	1	0	36 (2)	1	10	0 (Note: Kieftenbeld was sent off against Brentford on 2 October, but the decision was reversed on appeal.)
7	MF	ENG	Connor Mahoney *	17 (13)	2	1	0	1	0	19 (13)	2	0	0
8	MF	ENG	Craig Gardner	5 (16)	1	0 (1)	0	0	0	5 (17)	1	7	1
9	FW	ENG	Che Adams	43 (3)	22	1	0	0 (1)	0	44 (4)	22	5	0
10	FW	ENG	Lukas Jutkiewicz	44 (2)	14	1	0	0	0	45 (2)	14	4	0
11	FW	ENG	Isaac Vassell	2 (12)	0	0	0	0	0	2 (12)	0	1	0
12	DF	ENG	Harlee Dean	44	1	1	0	0	0	45	1	5	0
14	FW	ENG	Omar Bogle * †	3 (12)	1	0	0	1	0	4 (12)	1	0	0
17	MF	SEN	Cheikh Ndoye	1 (1)	0	0	0	0	0	1 (1)	0	1	0
18	MF	SWE	Kerim Mrabti	6 (6)	1	0	0	0	0	6 (6)	1	0	0
19	MF	COD	Jacques Maghoma	35 (7)	6	1	0	0	0	36 (7)	6	5	0
20	MF	ENG	Gary Gardner *	39 (1)	2	1	0	1	0	41 (1)	2	13	0
22	MF	ENG	Viv Solomon-Otabor	0 (8)	1	0 (1)	0	1	0	1 (9)	1	0	0
23	FW	ESP	Jota	33 (7)	3	0	0	0 (1)	0	33 (8)	3	4	0
24	DF	ENG	Dan Scarr †	0	0	0	0	1	0	1	0	0	0
25	DF	ENG	Josh Dacres-Cogley	0 (1)	0	0	0	1	0	1 (1)	0	1	0
26	MF	ENG	David Davis	8 (3)	0	0	0	0	0	8 (3)	0	3	0
27	GK	ENG	Connal Trueman	2	0	0	0	0	0	2	0	0	0
28	DF	ENG	Michael Morrison	43	7	1	0	0	0	44	7	7	0
30	FW	COD	Beryly Lubala	0 (3)	0	0	0	1	0	1 (3)	0	0	0
31	MF	ENG	Charlie Lakin	5 (5)	0	0	0	0 (1)	0	5 (6)	0	0	0
32	DF	ENG	Steve Seddon	0	0	0	0	0	0	0	0	0	0
40	GK	ENG	Jake Weaver	0	0	0	0	0	0	0	0	0	0
45	DF	ENG	Wes Harding	13 (14)	0	1	0	1	0	15 (14)	0	3	0

Players not included in matchday squads
No.	Pos.	Nat.	Name
	DF	ENG	Jonathan Grounds
	GK	POL	Tomasz Kuszczak
	DF	IRL	Corey O'Keeffe
	GK	ENG	David Stockdale
