= 2011–12 Premier Reserve League =

Premier Reserve League
- Season: 2011–12
- Champions: Manchester United Reserves
- Goals: 562
- Average goals/game: 3.18
- Top goalscorer: Will Keane (15); Marcello Trotta (15)
- Biggest home win: Fulham Reserves 7–0 Bolton Wanderers Reserves (30 August 2011)
- Biggest away win: Norwich City Reserves 0–5 Arsenal Reserves (21 February 2012)
- Highest scoring: Sunderland Reserves 6–3 Manchester United Reserves (8 December 2011); Everton Reserves 6–3 Newcastle United Reserves (14 February 2012); Newcastle United Reserves 3–6 Manchester United Reserves (16 April 2012)
- Longest winning run: 6 games – West Bromwich Albion Reserves (6 September 2011 – 1 November 2011); Aston Villa Reserves (17 January 2012 – 12 March 2012)
- Longest unbeaten run: 9 games – Everton Reserves (22 November 2011 – 22 March 2012); Liverpool Reserves (7 February 2012 – 19 April 2012)
- Longest losing run: 5 games – Newcastle United Reserves (20 March 2012 – 16 April 2012)

The 2011–12 Premier Reserve League (officially known as the 2011–12 Barclays Premier Reserve League for sponsorship reasons) was the thirteenth season since the establishment of the Premier Reserve League.

The events in the senior leagues during the 2010–11 season saw Blackpool and West Ham United relegated and replaced by the promoted sides Norwich City & Swansea City. While Birmingham City were relegated from the Premier League and Queens Park Rangers were promoted to the Premier League, neither side decided to participate in the reserve league.

The geographical split of the 16 participating teams meant it was possible to drop the overcomplicated 2010–11 structure and revert to a simpler North & South structure. The Northern league now consists of Blackburn Rovers, Bolton Wanderers, Everton, Liverpool, Manchester United, Newcastle United, Sunderland and Wigan Athletic. Manchester City chose not to participate this season. The Southern League consists of Arsenal, Aston Villa, Chelsea, Fulham (who have chosen to participate this season), Norwich City, Swansea City, West Bromwich Albion & Wolverhampton Wanderers

Each team played the teams in their own league home and away. They also played each team in the other league once (home and away games split evenly). This resulted in 22 league games (14 + 8).

At the conclusion of the league season, the two league winners played the final in the home ground of the Northern league winner. The venue alternates between North & South each year. Last year it was held at Stamford Bridge, the home of eventual champions Chelsea.

On 10 May 2012, Manchester United Reserves won the Play-off Final.

== Tables ==
=== Premier Reserve League North ===
Final table

Pos	Club	Pld	W	D	L	F	A	GD	Pts
1	Manchester United Reserves (C)	22	15	4	3	58	23	+35	49
2	Liverpool Reserves	22	9	8	5	44	30	+14	35
3	Everton Reserves	22	9	8	5	38	29	+9	35
4	Sunderland Reserves	22	9	5	8	38	36	+2	32
5	Newcastle United Reserves	22	7	4	11	38	58	−20	25
6	Wigan Athletic Reserves	22	5	9	8	27	37	−10	24
7	Blackburn Rovers Reserves	22	4	10	8	18	22	−4	22
8	Bolton Wanderers Reserves	22	3	8	11	23	40	−17	17

=== Premier Reserve League South ===
Final table

Pos	Club	Pld	W	D	L	F	A	GD	Pts
1	Aston Villa Reserves (C)	22	13	4	5	45	22	+23	43
2	Fulham Reserves	22	12	4	6	46	25	+21	40
3	Arsenal Reserves	22	11	5	6	36	25	+11	38
4	West Bromwich Albion Reserves	22	11	2	9	36	31	+5	35
5	Chelsea Reserves	22	7	7	8	42	43	−1	28
6	Wolverhampton Wanderers Reserves	22	6	5	11	26	41	−15	23
7	Swansea City Reserves	22	4	8	10	21	38	−17	20
8	Norwich City Reserves	22	2	7	13	26	62	−36	13

Source: Football Club History Database

Rules for classification: 1st points; 2nd goal difference; 3rd goals scored
Pos = Position; Pld = Matches played; W = Matches won; D = Matches drawn; L = Matches lost; F = Goals for; A = Goals against; GD = Goal difference; Pts = Points; C = Champions

== Play-off Final ==
At the conclusion of the league season, the two league winners played the final in the home ground of the Northern league winner.

10 May 2012
19:00 BST

Manchester United Reserves	0–0	Aston Villa Reserves
	Report
Penalties
Joshua King (penalty scored); Jesse Lingard (penalty scored); Will Keane (penalty scored)	3–1	(penalty scored) Barry Bannan; (penalty missed) Samir Carruthers; (penalty missed) Daniel Johnson; (penalty missed) Courtney Cameron

Old Trafford, Manchester
Attendance: 5,130

== Goal scorers ==
=== Premier Reserve League North ===
Rank	Player	Team	Goals
1	(Republic of Ireland) Will Keane	Manchester United	15
2	(England) Ryan Noble	Sunderland	11
3	(England) Nathan Eccleston	Liverpool	8
4	(Greece) Apostolos Vellios	Everton	7
4	(England) Michael Ngoo	Liverpool	7
4	(Senegal) Mame Biram Diouf	Manchester United	7
4	(Italy) Davide Petrucci	Manchester United	7
8	(England) Jose Baxter	Everton	6
8	(England) Raheem Sterling	Liverpool	6
8	(England) Jesse Lingard	Manchester United	6
8	(England) Jordan Rugg	Wigan Athletic	6
12	(England) Conor Coady	Liverpool	5
12	(Spain) Suso	Liverpool	5
12	(France) Oumare Tounkara	Sunderland	5
15	(Senegal) Magaye Gueye	Everton	4
15	(England) Michael Keane	Manchester United	4
15	(England) Dan Gosling	Newcastle United	4
15	(Philippines) Adam Reed	Sunderland	4
15	(England) Daniel Redmond	Wigan Athletic	4
20	(Barbados) Nick Blackman	Blackburn Rovers	3
20	(England) Jordan Slew	Blackburn Rovers	3
20	(England) Oluwasanmi Odelusi	Bolton Wanderers	3
20	(Scotland) Michael O'Halloran	Bolton Wanderers	3
20	(England) Ross Barkley	Everton	3
20	(England) John Lundstram	Everton	3
20	(England) Conor McAleny	Everton	3
20	(England) Jonjo Shelvey	Liverpool	3
20	(England) Larnell Cole	Manchester United	3
20	(France) Paul Pogba	Manchester United	3
20	(England) Ryan Donaldson	Newcastle United	3
20	(England) Nile Ranger	Newcastle United	3
20	(England) Michael Richardson	Newcastle United	3
20	(England) Dan Taylor	Newcastle United	3
20	(England) Jordan Cook	Sunderland	3
20	(England) Roarie Deacon	Sunderland	3
20	(Mali) Nouha Dicko	Wigan Athletic	3
37	(Spain) Hugo Fernandez	Blackburn Rovers	2
37	(Australia) Jamie Maclaren	Blackburn Rovers	2
37	(England) Josh Morris	Blackburn Rovers	2
37	(England) Adam Blakeman	Bolton Wanderers	2
37	(France) David Ngog	Bolton Wanderers	2
37	(England) Jack Sampson	Bolton Wanderers	2
37	(Turkey) Tuncay	Bolton Wanderers	2
37	(Barbados) Hallam Hope	Everton	2
37	(Portugal) João Silva	Everton	2
37	(Hungary) Krisztián Adorján	Liverpool	2
37	(England) Adam Morgan	Liverpool	2
37	(England) Jay Spearing	Liverpool	2
37	(Belgium) Ritchie de Laet	Manchester United	2
37	(Jamaica) Ravel Morrison	Manchester United	2
37	(England) Philip Airey	Newcastle United	2
37	(Algeria) Mehdi Abeid	Newcastle United	2
37	(Nigeria) Sammy Ameobi	Newcastle United	2
37	(Scotland) Bradden Inman	Newcastle United	2
37	(France) Sylvain Marveaux	Newcastle United	2
37	(England) Greg McDermott	Newcastle United	2
37	(Republic of the Congo) Yven Moyo	Newcastle United	2
37	(England) Billy Knott	Sunderland	2
37	(England) Craig Lynch	Sunderland	2
37	(England) Adam Dawson	Wigan Athletic	2
37	(England) Callum McManaman	Wigan Athletic	2
62	(England) Myles Anderson	Blackburn Rovers	1
62	(Jamaica) Jonson Clarke-Harris	Blackburn Rovers	1
62	(France) Hérold Goulon	Blackburn Rovers	1
62	(Nigeria) Osayamen Osawe	Blackburn Rovers	1
62	(England) Jackson Ramm	Blackburn Rovers	1
62	(Brazil) Bruno Ribeiro	Blackburn Rovers	1
62	(Republic of Ireland) Mark Connolly	Bolton Wanderers	1
62	(England) Tom Eaves	Bolton Wanderers	1
62	(Republic of Ireland) Liam Irwin	Bolton Wanderers	1
62	(England) Alex McQuade	Bolton Wanderers	1
62	(England) Tope Obadeyi	Bolton Wanderers	1
62	(Bulgaria) Martin Petrov	Bolton Wanderers	1
62	(England) Joe Riley	Bolton Wanderers	1
62	(England) Josh Vela	Bolton Wanderers	1
62	(Republic of Ireland) Seamus Coleman	Everton	1
62	(Netherlands) Royston Drenthe	Everton	1
62	(England) Adam Forshaw	Everton	1
62	(England) Luke Garbutt	Everton	1
62	(England) Chris Long	Everton	1
62	(England) Leon Osman	Everton	1
62	(Nigeria) Yakubu	Everton	1
62	(Uruguay) Sebastián Coates	Liverpool	1
62	(England) Jon Flanagan	Liverpool	1
62	(Northern Ireland) Ryan McLaughlin	Liverpool	1
62	(England) Michael Roberts	Liverpool	1
62	(England) Reece Brown	Manchester United	1
62	(England) Zeki Fryers	Manchester United	1
62	(Italy) Federico Macheda	Manchester United	1
62	(Italy) Alberto Massacci	Manchester United	1
62	(England) Chris Smalling	Manchester United	1
62	(England) Ryan Tunnicliffe	Manchester United	1
62	(Belgium) Marnick Vermijl	Manchester United	1
62	(Northern Ireland) Shane Ferguson	Newcastle United	1
62	(England) Jeff Henderson	Newcastle United	1
62	(England) Ryan McGorrigan	Newcastle United	1
62	(England) Marcus Maddison	Newcastle United	1
62	(France) Gabriel Obertan	Newcastle United	1
62	(England) Jason Prior	Newcastle United	1
62	(England) Remie Streete	Newcastle United	1
62	(Slovenia) Haris Vučkić	Newcastle United	1
62	(England) Fraizer Campbell	Sunderland	1
62	(England) Brett Elliott	Sunderland	1
62	(England) Craig Gardner	Sunderland	1
62	(England) Matthew Kilgallon	Sunderland	1
62	(England) Louis Laing	Sunderland	1
62	(Republic of Ireland) David Meyler	Sunderland	1
62	(England) Adam Mitchell	Sunderland	1
62	(England) Peter Aylmer	Wigan Athletic	1
62	(England) Rakish Bingham	Wigan Athletic	1
62	(England) Adam Buxton	Wigan Athletic	1
62	(Taiwan) Tim Chow	Wigan Athletic	1
62	(Ivory Coast) Steve Gohouri	Wigan Athletic	1
62	(Scotland) Jamie McCormack	Wigan Athletic	1
62	(England) Callum Morris	Wigan Athletic	1
62	(Republic of Ireland) Conor Sammon	Wigan Athletic	1

==== Own goals ====
Rank	Player	Team	Goals
1	(Scotland) Grant Hanley	Blackburn Rovers	1
1	(England) Tom Eckersley	Bolton Wanderers	1
1	(Germany) Shkodran Mustafi	Everton	1
1	(Sweden) Ole Söderberg	Newcastle United	1
1	(England) Liam Marrs	Sunderland	1

=== Premier Reserve League South ===
Rank	Player	Team	Goals
1	(Italy) Marcello Trotta	Fulham	15
2	(Austria) Andreas Weimann	Aston Villa	9
3	(Saint Kitts and Nevis) Romaine Sawyers	West Bromwich Albion	8
4	(England) Sanchez Watt	Arsenal	7
4	(Belgium) Romelu Lukaku	Chelsea	7
6	(England) Chuks Aneke	Arsenal	6
6	(Republic of Ireland) Callum Robinson	Aston Villa	6
6	(Slovakia) Milan Lalkovič	Chelsea	6
6	(Northern Ireland) Matt Ball	Norwich City	6
6	(Scotland) Stephen Dobbie	Swansea City	6
6	(Burundi) Saido Berahino	West Bromwich Albion	6
12	(Turkey) Oğuzhan Özyakup	Arsenal	5
12	(Republic of Ireland) Michael Drennan	Aston Villa	5
12	(England) Gary Gardner	Aston Villa	5
12	(Jamaica) Daniel Johnson	Aston Villa	5
12	(Turkey) Kerim Frei	Fulham	5
17	(Republic of Ireland) Graham Burke	Aston Villa	4
17	(Republic of Ireland) Samir Carruthers	Aston Villa	4
17	(England) Patrick Bamford	Chelsea	4
17	(England) Nathaniel Chalobah	Chelsea	4
17	(Brazil) Lucas Piazón	Chelsea	4
17	(England) Tom Donegan	Fulham	4
17	(England) Alex Smith	Fulham	4
17	(Jamaica) Jamar Loza	Norwich City	4
17	(England) Aaron Wilbraham	Norwich City	4
17	(Wales) Casey Thomas	Swansea City	4
27	(Scotland) Barry Bannan	Aston Villa	3
27	(Sweden) Alex Kačaniklić	Fulham	3
27	(Switzerland) Pajtim Kasami	Fulham	3
27	(England) Richard Brindley	Norwich City	3
27	(Scotland) Craig Beattie	Swansea City	3
27	(England) Lateef Elford-Alliyu	West Bromwich Albion	3
27	(Jamaica) Kemar Roofe	West Bromwich Albion	3
27	(England) Ashley Hemmings	Wolverhampton Wanderers	3
27	(Northern Ireland) Liam McAlinden	Wolverhampton Wanderers	3
36	(Russia) Andrei Arshavin	Arsenal	2
36	(South Korea) Park Chu-Young	Arsenal	2
36	(England) Luke Freeman	Arsenal	2
36	(Germany) Serge Gnabry	Arsenal	2
36	(England) Billy Clifford	Chelsea	2
36	(Scotland) Islam Feruz	Chelsea	2
36	(England) Todd Kane	Chelsea	2
36	(England) Jacob Mellis	Chelsea	2
36	(England) Adam Phillip	Chelsea	2
36	(Portugal) Orlando Sá	Fulham	2
36	(Portugal) Buomesca Tue Na Bangna	Fulham	2
36	(England) George Francomb	Norwich City	2
36	(England) James Vaughan	Norwich City	2
36	(Wales) David Cotterill	Swansea City	2
36	(England) Luke Moore	Swansea City	2
36	(France) Marc-Antoine Fortuné	West Bromwich Albion	2
36	(Wales) Jake Cassidy	Wolverhampton Wanderers	2
36	(Northern Ireland) Johnny Gorman	Wolverhampton Wanderers	2
36	(England) Michael Ihiekwe	Wolverhampton Wanderers	2
36	(England) Zeli Ismail	Wolverhampton Wanderers	2
36	(England) Jake Kempton	Wolverhampton Wanderers	2
36	(England) Jamie Reckord	Wolverhampton Wanderers	2
36	(England) James Spray	Wolverhampton Wanderers	2
59	(Democratic Republic of the Congo) Benik Afobe	Arsenal	1
59	(Ghana) Zak Ansah	Arsenal	1
59	(Spain) Hector Bellerin	Arsenal	1
59	(Israel) Yossi Benayoun	Arsenal	1
59	(France) Abou Diaby	Arsenal	1
59	(Germany) Thomas Eisfeld	Arsenal	1
59	(Japan) Ryo Miyaichi	Arsenal	1
59	(Republic of Ireland) Philip Roberts	Arsenal	1
59	(Spain) Jon Toral	Arsenal	1
59	(China) Nicholas Yennaris	Arsenal	1
59	(England) Marc Albrighton	Aston Villa	1
59	(England) Nathan Delfouneso	Aston Villa	1
59	(United States) Eric Lichaj	Aston Villa	1
59	(England) Connor Taylor	Aston Villa	1
59	(England) Ryan Bertrand	Chelsea	1
59	(Guinea-Bissau) Aliu Djaló	Chelsea	1
59	(England) Josh McEachran	Chelsea	1
59	(Sweden) Marko Mitrović	Chelsea	1
59	(England) Ismail Seremba	Chelsea	1
59	(Netherlands) Patrick van Aanholt	Chelsea	1
59	(England) Alex Brister	Fulham	1
59	(Denmark) Lasse Vigen Christensen	Fulham	1
59	(Algeria) Rafik Halliche	Fulham	1
59	(England) Courtney Harris	Fulham	1
59	(Norway) Bjørn Helge Riise	Fulham	1
59	(Wales) Josh Pritchard	Fulham	1
59	(India) Ryan Williams	Fulham	1
59	(England) Cauley Woodrow	Fulham	1
59	(England) Michael Clunan	Norwich City	1
59	(Wales) Josh Dawkin	Norwich City	1
59	(England) Patrick Drmola	Norwich City	1
59	(England) Jacob Murphy	Norwich City	1
59	(Northern Ireland) Rory Donnelly	Swansea City	1
59	(England) Leroy Lita	Swansea City	1
59	(Wales) Kurtis March	Swansea City	1
59	(France) Darnel Situ	Swansea City	1
59	(Scotland) Scott Allan	West Bromwich Albion	1
59	(England) Wesley Atkinson	West Bromwich Albion	1
59	(Czech Republic) Roman Bednář	West Bromwich Albion	1
59	(Wales) Kayleden Brown	West Bromwich Albion	1
59	(Montserrat) Donervorn Daniels	West Bromwich Albion	1
59	(England) Craig Dawson	West Bromwich Albion	1
59	(Scotland) Graham Dorrans	West Bromwich Albion	1
59	(Hungary) Zoltán Gera	West Bromwich Albion	1
59	(England) David Goldsmith	West Bromwich Albion	1
59	(England) James Hurst	West Bromwich Albion	1
59	(England) Alex Jones	West Bromwich Albion	1
59	(England) Sam Mantom	West Bromwich Albion	1
59	(England) Nicky Shorey	West Bromwich Albion	1
59	(New Zealand) Chris Wood	West Bromwich Albion	1
59	(England) Ethan Ebanks-Landell	Wolverhampton Wanderers	1
59	(Republic of Ireland) Anthony Forde	Wolverhampton Wanderers	1
59	(England) Louis Harris	Wolverhampton Wanderers	1
59	(Serbia) Nenad Milijaš	Wolverhampton Wanderers	1
59	(Wales) Sam Vokes	Wolverhampton Wanderers	1
59	(England) Sam Winnall	Wolverhampton Wanderers	1

==== Own goals ====
Rank	Player	Team	Goals
1	(England) Wesley Atkinson	West Bromwich Albion	1

== Promotion and relegation ==
Teams relegated from the Premier Reserve League at the end of this season:

- Bolton Wanderers
- Blackburn Rovers
- Wolverhampton Wanderers

Teams promoted to the Premier Reserve League at the end of this season:

- Reading
- Southampton
- West Ham

== See also ==
- 2011–12 Premier Academy League
- 2011–12 FA Youth Cup
- 2011–12 Premier League
- 2011–12 in English football

Premier Reserve League North	Premier Reserve League South
Blackburn Rovers; Bolton Wanderers; Everton; Liverpool; Manchester United; Newcastle United; Sunderland; Wigan Athletic	Arsenal; Aston Villa; Chelsea; Fulham; Norwich City; Swansea City; West Bromwich Albion; Wolverhampton Wanderers
