= Jake Bidwell =

English footballer (born 1993)

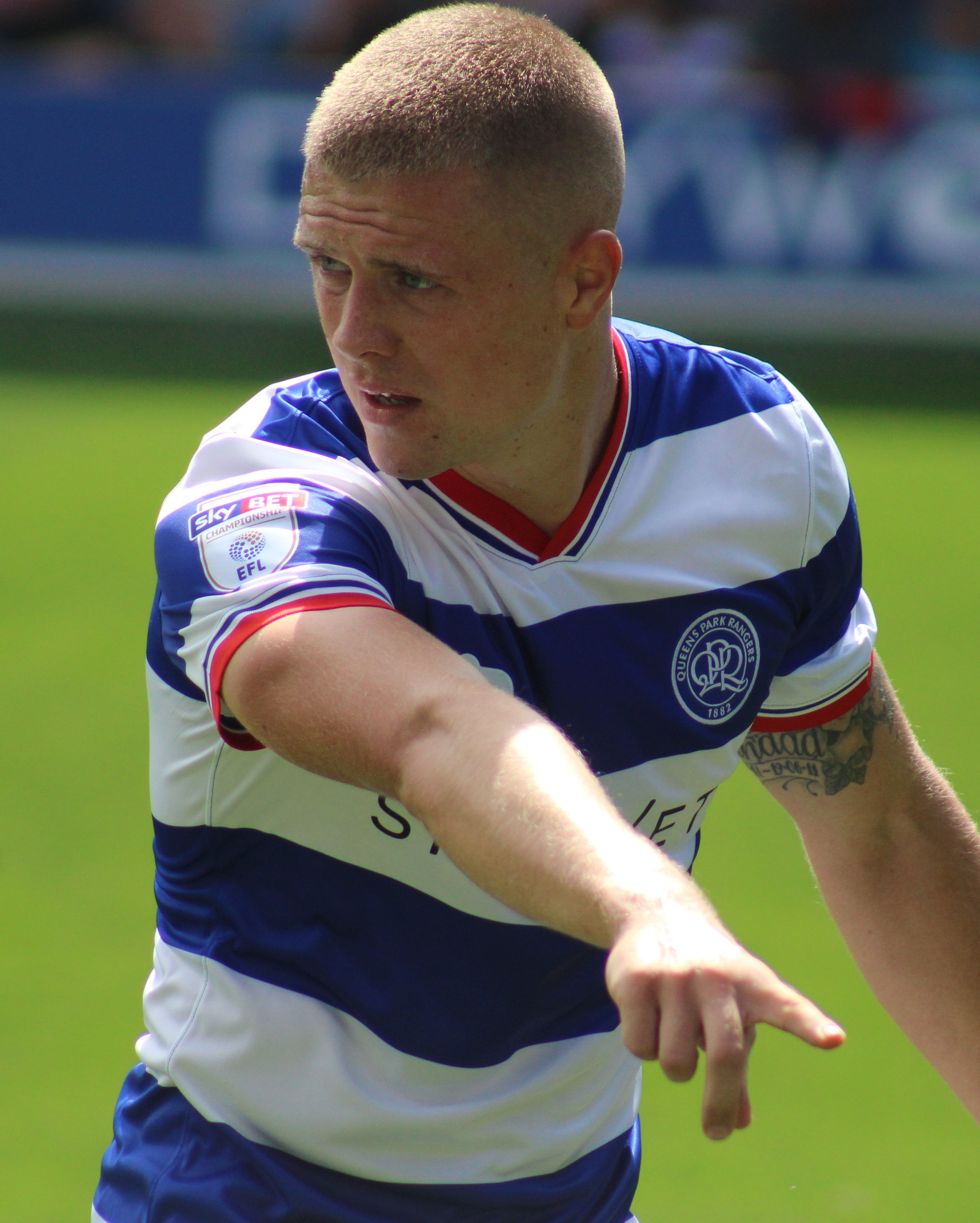
- Bidwell playing for Queens Park Rangers in 2016

Personal information
- Full name: Jake Brian Bidwell
- Date of birth: 21 March 1993 (age 33)
- Place of birth: Southport, England
- Height: 6 ft 0 in (1.83 m)
- Position: Defender

Team information
- Current team: Coventry City
- Number: 21

Youth career
- 2004–2009: Everton

Senior career*
Years	Team	Apps	(Gls)
2009–2013	Everton	0	(0)
2011–2012	→ Brentford (loan)	24	(0)
2012–2013	→ Brentford (loan)	40	(0)
2013–2016	Brentford	126	(3)
2016–2019	Queens Park Rangers	122	(2)
2019–2022	Swansea City	92	(3)
2022–	Coventry City	134	(3)

International career
2009	England U16	4	(2)
2009	England U17	7	(1)
2011	England U18	1	(0)
2011–2012	England U19	3	(0)
- * Club domestic league appearances and goals as of 19:44, 29 November 2025 (UTC)

Jake Brian Bidwell (born 21 March 1993) is an English professional footballer who plays as a left back for Premier League club Coventry City. He began his career in the academy at Premier League side Everton and was capped by England at age-group level.

== Club career ==
=== Everton ===
Bidwell grew up in Southport and joined the academy at Premier League side Everton at age 11. For his first two seasons he played as a goalkeeper. Switching to left back, he progressed through the ranks to the club's U18 team, making his debut early in the 2008–09 season. He made 19 Premier Academy League appearances for the U18 team during the 2008–09 season and made his reserve team debut in a 2–0 Premier Reserve League North defeat to Manchester United on 16 April 2009. Bidwell's progression saw him sign a scholarship deal in the summer of 2009. Bidwell received his maiden call up to the first team for a dead rubber Europa League group stage game at home to BATE Borisov on 17 December 2009 and played the full 90 minutes of the 1–0 defeat. With that appearance, he broke the record as Everton's youngest ever player to play in a European game.

Bidwell played solely for the U18s and reserves during the 2010–11 season, making 21 and 12 appearances respectively and captained the U18s to the Premier Academy League title. For his efforts, Bidwell was named Everton's 2010–11 Academy Player of the Year award. Bidwell received a squad number, but failed to receive a call into a first team during the 2011–12 season and departed on loan for the rest of the campaign on 24 November 2011. He spent almost the entire 2012–13 season away on loan and departed the club on 17 June 2013, having made just one first team appearance. He made nearly 100 appearances and scored seven goals for the U18 and reserve teams.

=== Brentford ===
On 24 November 2011, Bidwell signed for League One side Brentford on loan until 8 January 2012 as cover at left back and left midfield, to fill a void after the departures of Sam Wood and Blair Adams. He made his debut with a start in a Football League Trophy Southern Area semi-final shootout defeat to Barnet on 6 December. Bidwell made his league debut in the following game at Griffin Park, helping the Bees to a 2–1 victory over Hartlepool United. Owing to his good form, Bidwell's loan was extended through to the end of the 2011–12 season. Bidwell provided two assists for hat-trick hero Gary Alexander in a 5–2 win over Wycombe Wanderers on 28 January 2012. Despite making the left back position his own, the return to fitness of Pim Balkestein late in the season saw Bidwell move into left midfield. He was a virtual ever-present through to the end of the campaign and made 25 appearances during the 2011–12 season.

Bidwell rejoined Brentford on a one-month loan on 29 August 2012 and through repeated extensions of the loan, he remained at Griffin Park for the remainder of the 2012–13 season. He retained his position as manager Uwe Rösler's first choice left back and was a virtual ever-present throughout the season. Bidwell received the first red card of his senior career for two bookable offences in a 2–2 draw with Leyton Orient on 22 January 2013. The suspension meant he missed Brentford's 2–2 draw with Premier League neighbours Chelsea in the fourth round of the season's FA Cup. Bidwell made 50 appearances during the 2012–13 season and experienced heartbreak at the end of the campaign, after a missed Marcello Trotta penalty in the final league game to Doncaster Rovers and defeat in the play-off final to Yeovil Town consigned Brentford to another season in League One.

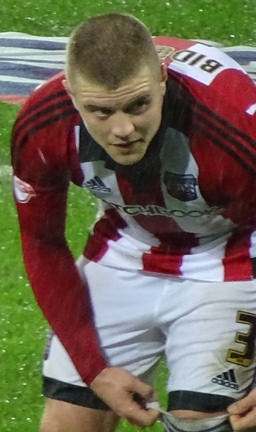
Bidwell playing for Brentford in 2015

Bidwell signed for Brentford permanently on a three-year deal for an undisclosed fee on 17 June 2013. After starting in Brentford's first three league games of the season, Bidwell suffered the first serious injury of his career after taking a knock to his ankle in a 1–1 league draw with Gillingham on 17 August 2013. He returned to action in a 2–1 Football League Trophy second round defeat to Peterborough United on 8 October and was the first-choice left back through to the end of the season. Bidwell hit a patch of form in January 2014, assisting goals for Will Grigg, Clayton Donaldson and Jonathan Douglas in successive wins over Port Vale, Walsall and Gillingham and won the Football League Young Player of the Month award for his efforts. He made his 100th Brentford appearance in a 1–1 draw with Shrewsbury Town on 1 February. Towards the end of a successful season in which Brentford clinched automatic promotion to the Championship, Bidwell was named in the 2013–14 League One PFA Team of the Year and as a substitute in the League One Team of the Year. He made 41 appearances during the 2013–14 season and signed a new three-year contract on 24 July 2014.

Bidwell began the 2014–15 season as an ever-present and on his sixth appearance was named captain of the side for the first time, for a 1–0 League Cup second round West London derby defeat to Fulham. A hand in two of Brentford's goals in a 3–2 victory over Brighton & Hove Albion on 13 September earned him a place in the Football League Team of the Week. His ever-present status came to an end after he was sent off in the 37th minute of a 2–1 defeat to fellow play-off contenders Watford on 10 February 2015. Upon his return to the team three weeks later, Bidwell celebrated his 150th Brentford appearance when he came on for Jota with half an hour remaining of an eventual 1–0 defeat to Birmingham City. He finished a successful 2014–15 season with 51 appearances, after Brentford were knocked out in the play-off semi-finals by Middlesbrough.

After the retirement of club captain Kevin O'Connor and the departures of stand-in captains Tony Craig and Jonathan Douglas, Bidwell was named as captain for the 2015–16 season. On 15 December, Bidwell finally broke his scoring duck on his 186th Brentford appearance, heading in during the second half of a 3–2 defeat to Cardiff City. He scored his second goal seven weeks later, with a free kick versus Preston North End and a third goal in a 4–1 rout of Milton Keynes Dons on 23 April 2016. He missed just one match during the season and talks over a contract extension began in May 2016. The talks proved fruitless and Bidwell left the club on 1 July 2016. Over the course of four-and-a-half seasons at Griffin Park, Bidwell made 211 appearances and scored three goals.

=== Queens Park Rangers ===
On 1 July 2016, Bidwell joined Championship club Queens Park Rangers on a three-year contract for an undisclosed fee. He scored his first goal for QPR in a 2–1 FA Cup loss to Blackburn Rovers on 7 January 2017. He scored his first league goal in a 3–1 win at Aston Villa on 13 March 2018. On 30 March 2018, with QPR losing 1–0 at Reading, he had a last-minute penalty saved by Vito Mannone.

=== Swansea City ===
On 2 July 2019, Bidwell joined Championship side Swansea City on a free transfer. He scored his first goal for Swansea against Millwall on 3 October 2020. Bidwell helped Swansea to a 4th placed finish in the Championship, featuring in both semi-final legs and the final where Swansea were defeated 2–0 by Brentford. He left Swansea on 17 January 2022, having made 92 appearances and scored 3 goals for the club.

=== Coventry City ===
On 17 January 2022, Bidwell signed for Championship club Coventry City on a free transfer, signing a two-and-a-half-year contract. On 1 January 2023, Bidwell scored his first goal for the Sky Blues against Bristol City.

== International career ==
Bidwell represented England at age-group level from U16 through to U19. He made his U16 debut in England's opening 2009 Montaigu Tournament group stage match versus Russia on 8 April 2009. He scored England's third goal in a 3–1 win. He scored his second goal for the U16s with a penalty in a 3–0 win over Ivory Coast in England's final group match. He played in the final, in which England beat Germany in a penalty shootout. Bidwell won the 2009 Nordic Tournament with the U17s and scored the winning goal in extra time in the final as England fought back from two goals down to beat Scotland 3–2. Bidwell made his only appearance for the U18s in a friendly against Italy on 12 April 2011. He replaced George Thorne at half time during the 1–1 draw. Bidwell made his U19 debut in a 1–0 friendly win over Denmark on 10 November 2011. He started the match and was replaced by Todd Kane at half time. He made a half-time substitute appearance for Everton teammate Luke Garbutt in a 2–1 friendly win over Czech Republic on 28 February 2012. Bidwell was called up for England's 2012 European U19 Championship elite qualification games and played the full 90 minutes in a 1–0 win over Switzerland on 30 May 2012. Despite being uncapped at U20 level, Bidwell was named in Peter Taylor's provisional squad for the 2013 U20 World Cup, but was left out of the final squad.

== Career statistics ==
As of match played on 16 September 2026

Club statistics
Club	Season	League			FA Cup		League Cup		Other		Total	
Club	Season	Division	Apps	Goals	Apps	Goals	Apps	Goals	Apps	Goals	Apps	Goals
Everton	2009–10	Premier League	0	0	0	0	0	0	1 (Note: Appearance in Europa League)	0	1	0
Everton	2010–11	Premier League	0	0	0	0	0	0	0	0	0	0
Everton	2011–12	Premier League	0	0	0	0	0	0	0	0	0	0
Everton	2012–13	Premier League	0	0	0	0	0	0	0	0	0	0
Everton	Total		0	0	0	0	0	0	1	0	1	0
Brentford (loan)	2011–12	League One	24	0	0	0	0	0	1 (Note: Appearance(s) in Football League / EFL Trophy)	0	25	0
Brentford (loan)	2012–13	League One	40	0	6	0	0	0	4 (Note: One Appearance in Football League Trophy, three appearances in League One play-offs)	0	50	0
Brentford	2013–14	League One	38	0	2	0	0	0	1	0	41	0
Brentford	2014–15	Championship	43	0	1	0	2	0	2 (Note: Appearances in Championship play-offs)	0	48	0
Brentford	2015–16	Championship	45	3	1	0	1	0	—		47	3
Brentford	Total		126	3	4	0	3	0	3	0	136	3
Queens Park Rangers	2016–17	Championship	36	0	1	1	1	0	—		38	1
Queens Park Rangers	2017–18	Championship	46	2	1	0	0	0	—		47	2
Queens Park Rangers	2018–19	Championship	40	0	4	1	1	0	—		45	1
Queens Park Rangers	Total		122	2	6	2	2	0	0	0	130	4
Swansea City	2019–20	Championship	37	0	1	0	0	0	2	0	40	0
Swansea City	2020–21	Championship	39	1	3	0	1	0	3	0	46	1
Swansea City	2021–22	Championship	16	2	0	0	3	0	—		19	2
Swansea City	Total		92	3	4	0	4	0	5	0	105	2
Coventry City	2021–22	Championship	16	0	1	0	0	0	—		17	0
Coventry City	2022–23	Championship	45	1	1	0	1	0	3 (Note: Appearance in Championship play-offs)	0	49	1
Coventry City	2023–24	Championship	33	1	4	0	1	0	—		38	1
Coventry City	2024–25	Championship	29	1	1	0	1	0	—		31	1
Coventry City	2025–26	Championship	11	0	1	0	2	0	0	0	14	0
Coventry City	2026–27	Premier League	0	0	0	0	2	0	—		2	0
Total			134	3	8	0	7	0	3	0	151	3
Career total			538	11	28	2	16	0	17	0	597	13

== Honours ==
Everton U18

- Premier Academy League: 2010–11

Brentford

- Football League One second-place promotion: 2013–14

Coventry City

- EFL Championship: 2025–26

England U16

- Montaigu Tournament: 2009

England U17

- Nordic Tournament: 2009

Individual

- Everton Academy Player of the Year: 2010–11
- Football League Young Player of the Month: January 2014
- PFA Team of the Year: 2013–14 League One
- PFA Community Champion: 2015–16
