= 2010–11 Premier Academy League =

- Champions: Everton U18s

The 2010–11 Premier Academy League Under–18 season is the fourteenth edition since the establishment of The Premier Academy League, and the seventh under the current make-up.

All teams played the other teams in their group twice and play 10 inter-group fixtures, producing 28 games a season. Eight of the inter-group games were played against teams in their 'paired group' (i.e. A–B and C–D are the paired groups), whilst the remaining two games comprise one game against a team in each of the two remaining groups. Winners of each group qualify for play-offs.

== League tables ==
=== Academy Group A ===
Updated as of 16 April 2011

Pos	Team	Pld	W	D	L	GF	GA	GD	Pts
1	Fulham U18s	28	15	6	7	55	35	+20	51
2	Southampton U18s	28	15	5	8	63	46	+17	50
3	West Ham United U18s	28	15	1	12	54	43	+11	46
4	Norwich City U18s	28	12	5	11	49	49	0	41
5	Arsenal U18s	28	12	3	13	41	45	-4	39
6	Crystal Palace U18s	28	12	3	13	45	51	-6	39
7	Ipswich Town U18s	28	9	7	12	40	50	-10	34
8	Charlton Athletic U18s	28	9	5	14	38	45	-7	32
9	Chelsea U18s	28	9	5	14	42	53	-3	32
10	Portsmouth U18s	28	4	5	19	32	63	-31	17

=== Academy Group B ===
Pos	Team	Pld	W	D	L	GF	GA	GD	Pts
1	Aston Villa U18	28	18	6	4			+39	60
2	Leicester City U18s	28	17	5	6			+28	56
3	Watford U18s	28	16	5	7			+14	53
4	Tottenham Hotspur U18s	28	13	6	9			+4	45
5	Reading U18s	28	14	2	12			+10	44
6	Birmingham City U18	27	11	5	11			-4	38
8	Bristol City U18s	28	10	3	15			-15	33
8	Coventry City U18s	28	6	12	10			-4	30
9	Cardiff City U18s	28	7	6	15			-19	27
10	Milton Keynes Dons U18s	27	2	4	21			-49	10

=== Academy Group C ===
Pos	Team	Pld	W	D	L	GF	GA	GD	Pts
1	Everton U18s	28	17	7	4			+25	58
2	Liverpool U18s	28	17	6	5			+37	57
3	Bolton Wanderers U18s	26	16	4	8			+7	46
4	Manchester City U18s	24	12	9	3			+8	45
5	Manchester United U18s	25	11	5	9			+8	38
6	Wolverhampton Wanderers U18s	24	11	4	9			+10	37
7	West Bromwich Albion U18s	25	10	7	8			+4	37
8	Crewe Alexandra U18s	26	11	2	13			-4	35
9	Blackburn Rovers U18s	26	9	5	12			+0	32
10	Stoke City U18s	27	5	3	19			-30	18

=== Academy Group D ===
Pos	Team	Pld	W	D	L	GF	GA	GD	Pts
1 C	Sunderland U18s	28	16	7	5	52	31	+21	55
2	Nottingham Forest U18s	28	16	3	9	54	35	+19	51
3	Barnsley U18s	28	12	5	11	53	46	+7	41
4	Newcastle United U18s	28	11	7	10	57	52	+5	40
5	Sheffield United U18s	28	11	6	11	42	45	-3	39
6	Middlesbrough U18s	28	11	4	13	47	54	-7	37
7	Leeds United U18s	28	10	4	14	30	51	-21	34
8	Huddersfield Town U18s	28	7	5	16	34	57	-23	26
9	Derby County U18s	28	7	3	18	53	59	-6	24
10	Sheffield Wednesday U18s	28	6	6	16	31	64	-33	24

Rules for classification: 1st points; 2nd goal difference; 3rd goals scored
Pos = Position; Pld = Matches played; W = Matches won; D = Matches drawn; L = Matches lost; GF = Goals for; GA = Goals against; GD = Goal difference; Pts = Points
Q = Qualified for playoffs; C = Champions

== Play-off semi-finals ==
9 May 2011
12:00pm

Everton U18s	3–2	Aston Villa U18
Tom Donegan 29', 35'; Conor McAleny 85'		Graham Burke 23'; MichaeI Drennan 70'

Finch Farm, Halewood

10 May 2011

Fulham U18s	3–3 (a.e.t.)	Sunderland U18s
Alex Smith 52'; Marcello Trotta 70'; Kerim Frei 93'		Craig Lynch 9'; Jordan Laidler 73'; Alejandro Gorrin 96'
Penalties
	4–1

Motspur Park, New Malden

== Play-off Final ==
13 May 2011

Fulham Under 18s	1–2	Everton Under 18s
Ronny Minkwitz 75'		Adam Thomas 81'; George Waring 89'

Craven Cottage, London

FULHAM U18s:
1	(Finland) Jesse Joronen
2	(Spain) Christian Marquez-Sanchez
3	(England) Alex Smith
4	(Wales) Josh Pritchard
5	(Ivory Coast) Cheick Toure (c)
6	(England) Stephen Arthurworrey
7	(England) Alex Brister
8	(Germany) Ronny Minkwitz
9	(Italy) Marcello Trotta
10	(Turkey) Kerim Frei
11	(England) Courtney Harris
Substitutes:
12	(Wales) Richard Peniket
13	(England) Grant Smith
14	(England) Charles Banya
15	(England) Josh Passley
16	(Australia) Corey Gameiro
Coach:
(Wales) Kit Symons

EVERTON U18s:
1	(Wales) Adam Davies
2	(China) Tyias Browning
3	(England) Luke Garbutt
4	(England) Jake Bidwell (c)
5	(England) Eric Dier
6	(England) Jordan Barrow	(substituted off) 76'
7	(England) Conor McAleny
8	(England) Tom Donegan
9	(England) Gerard Kinsella
10	(England) Anton Forrester
11	(England) Adam Thomas
Substitutes:
12	(England) George Waring	(substituted on) 76'
13	(Wales) Connor Roberts
14	(England) Ryan Higgins
15	(England) Tom Molyneux
16	(England) Daniel O'Brien
Coach:
(England) Neil Dewsnip

== See also ==
- 2010–11 Premier Reserve League
- 2010–11 FA Youth Cup
- 2010–11 Premier League
- 2010–11 in English football

Match reports can be found at each club's official website:
Group A	Group B	Group C	Group D
Arsenal; Charlton Athletic; Chelsea; Crystal Palace; Fulham; Ipswich Town; Norwich City; Portsmouth; Southampton; West Ham United	Aston Villa; Birmingham City; Bristol City; Cardiff City; Coventry City; Leicester City; Milton Keynes Dons; Reading; Tottenham Hotspur; Watford	Blackburn Rovers; Bolton Wanderers; Crewe Alexandra; Everton; Liverpool; Manchester City; Manchester United; Stoke City; West Bromwich Albion; Wolverhampton Wanderers	Barnsley; Derby County; Huddersfield Town; Leeds United; Middlesbrough; Newcastle United; Nottingham Forest; Sheffield United; Sheffield Wednesday; Sunderland
