= 2010–11 FA Youth Cup =

Tournament details
- Teams: 460

Final positions
- Champions: Manchester United (10th Title)
- Runners-up: Sheffield United (1st Runner Up Finish)

The FA Youth Cup sponsored by E.ON 2010–11 was the 59th edition of the FA Youth Cup. 460 clubs were initially accepted, with 53 teams being new entries.

The competition consisted of several rounds and was preceded by a qualifying competition, starting with the preliminary round, which was followed by four qualifying rounds for non-League teams. Football League teams entered the draw thereafter, with League One and League Two teams entering at the first round, and Premier League and Championship teams entering in the third round.

== Calendar ==
Round	Matches played from	Matches	Clubs
First round	6 November 2010	40	124 → 84
Second round	20 November 2010	20	84 → 64
Third round	11 December 2010	32	64 → 32
Fourth round	15 January 2011	16	32 → 16
Fifth round	29 January 2011	8	16 → 8
Sixth round	12 February 2011	4	8 → 4
Semi-finals (two legs)	5 March & 19 March 2011	4	4 → 2
Final (two legs)	17 May & 23 May 2011	2	2 → 1

== Fixtures and results ==
=== First round ===
Tie no	Home team	Score	Away team	Attendance
1	Crewe Alexandra	4–0	AFC Fylde	395
2	Bradford City	4–2	Rochdale	144
3	Hartlepool United	3–1	Whitley Bay	112
4	Carlisle United	3–1 †	Wrexham	207
5	Stockport County	1–4 †	Tranmere Rovers	211
6	Macclesfield Town	4–1	Fleetwood Town	107
7	Accrington Stanley	1–2	Darlington	48
8	Bury	2–5	Oldham Athletic	261
9	Rotherham United	2–3 †	Sheffield Wednesday	215
10	Huddersfield Town	5–1	Morecambe	159
11	Histon	0–3	Notts County	395
12	Bolehall Swifts	1–0	Northampton Town	130
13	Chesterfield	1–3	Port Vale	737
14	Grimsby Town	3–0	Stourbridge	127
15	Burton Albion	0–2	Stratford Town	165
16	Lincoln City	2–4	Peterborough United	200
17	Shrewsbury Town	5–1	Boston United	179
18	Milton Keynes Dons	0–1	Walsall	404
19	Coventry Sphinx	2–1	Hereford United	111
20	Thurrock	1–0	Leyton Orient	240
21	Barnet	2–3	Wycombe Wanderers	328
22	Northwood	1–3	Dulwich Hamlet	92

Tie no	Home team	Score	Away team	Attendance
23	Bury Town	5–4	Bromley	68
24	Brighton & Hove Albion	3–0	Ebbsfleet United	73
25	Dagenham & Redbridge	2–2 †	Stevenage	220
Dagenham & Redbridge advance 3–2 on penalties
26	Colchester United	3–5	Woking	189
27	Southend United	3–1 †	Luton Town	230
28	Charlton Athletic	2–0	Crawley Town	226
29	Concord Rangers	0–5	Brentford	102
30	Rushden & Diamonds	1–0	Carshalton Athletic	124
31	Gillingham	1–2 †	Cambridge United	299
32	Dartford	1–2	AFC Wimbledon	127
33	Newport County	1–2 †	Bristol Rovers	289
34	Forest Green Rovers	1–2 †	Swindon Town	191
35	Torquay United	4–0	Bracknell Town	139
36	Havant & Waterlooville	0–2	Yeovil Town	112
37	Cheltenham Town	2–2 †	Oxford United	216
Cheltenham Town advance 4–1 on penalties
38	Plymouth Argyle	1–3	Southampton	229
39	Cirencester Town	2–3	Aldershot Town	90
40	AFC Bournemouth	1–1 †	Exeter City	269
Exeter City advance 3–2 on penalties

† After extra time

=== Second round ===
Tie no	Home team	Score	Away team	Attendance
1	Huddersfield Town	0–4	Darlington	126
2	Peterborough United	5–0	Stratford Town	329
3	Notts County	2–0	Shrewsbury Town	369
4	Port Vale	1–1 †	Grimsby Town	174
Grimsby Town advance 5–4 on penalties
5	Carlisle United	0–2	Walsall	119
6	Bolehall Swifts	0–4	Bradford City	103
7	Oldham Athletic	3–2	Sheffield Wednesday	240
8	Macclesfield Town	0–2	Hartlepool United	94
9	Tranmere Rovers	1–2	Crewe Alexandra	322
10	Dagenham & Redbridge	2–2 †	Bristol Rovers	173
Bristol Rovers advance 4–2 on penalties

Tie no	Home team	Score	Away team	Attendance
11	AFC Wimbledon	0–3	Aldershot Town	187
12	Woking	2–4	Cheltenham Town	215
13	Dulwich Hamlet	3–2 †	Yeovil Town	86
14	Southampton	2–0	Thurrock	367
15	Brighton & Hove Albion	6–0	Torquay United	50
16	Cambridge United	1–2	Exeter City	119
17	Rushden & Diamonds	1–0	Wycombe Wanderers	187
18	Southend United	3–0	Brentford	234
19	Swindon Town	6–1	Coventry Sphinx	268
20	Charlton Athletic	4–0	Bury Town	153

† After extra time

=== Third round ===
Tie no	Home team	Score	Away team	Attendance
1	West Ham United	5–0	Aldershot Town	414
2	Blackburn Rovers	3–2 †	Reading	454
3	Doncaster Rovers	2–4	Middlesbrough	277
4	Dulwich Hamlet	2–6	Newcastle United	439
5	Grimsby Town	3–2	Burnley	300
6	Watford	2–0	Swindon Town	315
7	Leicester City	2–1	Hartlepool United	133
8	Sunderland	0–2	Chelsea	BCH
9	Arsenal	6–1	Darlington	217
10	Oldham Athletic	5–6	Manchester City	405
11	Brighton & Hove Albion	0–3	Derby County	67
12	Notts County	0–4	Liverpool	508
13	Barnsley	3–1	Tottenham Hotspur	810
14	Bristol City	0–2	Birmingham City	613
15	Bristol Rovers	0–1	Aston Villa	434
16	Wigan Athletic	3–0	Stoke City	186
17	Millwall	3–1	Walsall	279

Tie no	Home team	Score	Away team	Attendance
18	Queens Park Rangers	2–2 †	Nottingham Forest	306
Nottingham Forest advance 5–3 on penalties
19	Bolton Wanderers	1–2	Crewe Alexandra	537
20	Fulham	6–4 †	West Bromwich Albion	254
21	Leeds United	3–0	Scunthorpe United	248
22	Norwich City	1–0	Charlton Athletic	306
23	Hull City	2–3	Rushden & Diamonds	152
24	Southend United	3–1	Coventry City	483
25	Everton	2–1	Wolverhampton Wanderers	482
26	Blackpool	5–1	Exeter City	204
27	Preston North End	2–1	Swansea City	88
28	Cardiff City	0–3	Crystal Palace	406
29	Cheltenham Town	1–4	Sheffield United	179
30	Bradford City	1–1 †	Southampton	209
Bradford City advance 9–8 on penalties
31	Manchester United	3–2	Portsmouth	414
32	Ipswich Town	2–3	Peterborough United	287

† After extra time

=== Fourth round ===
Tie no	Home team	Score	Away team	Attendance
1	Barnsley	4–0	Rushden & Diamonds	710
2	Nottingham Forest	2–1	Manchester City	564
3	Crewe Alexandra	0–0	Leeds United	1,031
Leeds United advance 3–2 on penalties
4	Watford	3–2	Wigan Athletic	322
5	Peterborough United	1–3 †	Aston Villa	665
6	Middlesbrough	1–0	Everton	529
7	Leicester City	3–1	Blackburn Rovers	490
8	West Ham United	0–1	Manchester United	1,405

Tie no	Home team	Score	Away team	Attendance
9	Blackpool	4–3	Birmingham City	281
10	Sheffield United	3–0	Millwall	523
11	Derby County	1–3	Southend United	462
12	Newcastle United	2–1 †	Grimsby Town	1,043
13	Liverpool	3–1 †	Crystal Palace	1,197
14	Fulham	3–0	Norwich City	645
15	Preston North End	1–1	Bradford City	630
Preston North End advance 4–2 on penalties
16	Chelsea	2–1	Arsenal	7,200 or 4,383

† After extra time

=== Fifth round ===
Tie no	Home team	Score	Away team	Attendance
1	Leicester City	4–3 †	Preston North End	395
2	Leeds United	0–2	Aston Villa	604
3	Manchester United	1–0	Newcastle United	657
4	Fulham	0–2	Watford	698

Tie no	Home team	Score	Away team	Attendance
5	Liverpool	9–0	Southend United	1,716
6	Sheffield United	3–1 †	Blackpool	828
7	Chelsea	2–1	Barnsley	2,282
8	Nottingham Forest	0–1	Middlesbrough	562

† After extra time

=== Quarter-finals ===
Tie no	Home team	Score	Away team	Attendance
1	Liverpool	2–3	Manchester United	10,199
2	Aston Villa	3–1	Middlesbrough	820
3	Leicester City	1–2	Sheffield United	521
4	Chelsea	2–1	Watford	2,160

=== Semi-finals ===
Team 1	Agg.	Team 2	1st leg	2nd leg
Chelsea	3–6	Manchester United	3–2	0-4
Aston Villa	0–3	Sheffield United	0–1	0-2

==== First leg ====
10 April 2011
12:30

Chelsea	3–2	Manchester United
Chalobah 30', 42'; Devyne 72'	Report	Lingard 56'; Pogba 77'

Stamford Bridge, London
Attendance: 5,518

16 March 2011
19:00

Aston Villa	0–1	Sheffield United
	Report	Ironside 44'

Villa Park, Birmingham
Attendance: 1,541
Referee: Paul Tierney

==== Second leg ====
20 April 2011
19:00

Manchester United	4–0	Chelsea
Morrison 38'; Keane 42', 76', 87' (pen.)	Report

Old Trafford, Manchester
Attendance: 9,124

6 April 2011
19:00

Sheffield United	2–0	Aston Villa
Whitehouse 45', 73' (pen.)	Report

Bramall Lane, Sheffield
Attendance: 4,016

== Final ==
=== First leg ===
17 May 2011
19:30

Sheffield United	2–2	Manchester United
McFadzean 45'; Slew 73'	Report	Lingard 14'; Keane 70'

Bramall Lane, Sheffield
Attendance: 29,977
Referee: Michael Oliver

=== Second leg ===
23 May 2011
19:30

Manchester United	4–1	Sheffield United
Morrison 37', 70'; Keane 45' (pen.), 82'	Report	Ironside 73'

Old Trafford, Manchester
Attendance: 24,916
Referee: Michael Oliver

== See also ==
- 2010–11 Premier Academy League
- 2010–11 Premier Reserve League
- 2010–11 FA Cup
- 2010–11 in English football
