= 2004–05 FA Premier Academy League =

English football league season

The 2004–05 Premier Academy League Under–18 season was the 8th edition since the establishment of The Premier Academy League, and the 1st under the current make-up. The first match of the season was played in August 2004, and the season ended in May 2005.

Blackburn Rovers U18 were the champions.

== Semifinals ==
7 May 2005
11:00 GMT

Blackburn Rovers U18s	2–0	Southampton U18s
Gary Stopforth 11'; Rostyn Griffiths 90'	Report

Brockhall, Brockhall Village

7 May 2005
12:00 GMT

Coventry City U18s	1–0	Newcastle United
Paul McCrink 64'	Report

The Alan Higgs Centre, Coventry

== Final ==
11 May 2005
19:00 GMT

Blackburn Rovers U18s	4–3	Coventry City U18s
Keith Barker 53'; Joe Garner 90+1', 90+7'; Joel Byrom 90+4'		Paul McCrink 64'; Vijay Sidhu 77'; Luke Jones 77' (o.g.)

Ewood Park, Blackburn

== See also ==
- Premier Reserve League
- FA Youth Cup
- Football League Youth Alliance
- Premier League
- The Football League
