= 2005–06 FA Premier Academy League =

English football league season

The 2005–06 Premier Academy League Under–18 season was the ninth edition since the establishment of The Premier Academy League, and the 2nd under the current make-up. The first match of the season was played in August 2005, and the season ended in May 2006.

Southampton U18 were the champions.

== Semifinals ==
5 May 2006
19:00 GMT

Aston Villa U18s	4–0	Derby County U18s

6 May 2006
11:00 GMT

Southampton U18s	4–0	Blackburn Rovers U18s

== Final ==
12 May 2006
19:00 GMT

Southampton U18s	3–2	Aston Villa U18s
	Report

St. Mary's Stadium, Southampton
Attendance: 2,748

== See also ==
- Premier Reserve League
- FA Youth Cup
- Football League Youth Alliance
- Premier League
- The Football League
