= 2011–12 Premier Academy League =

Premier Academy League
- Season: 2011–12
- Goals: 1,773
- Average goals/game: 3.52
- Biggest home win: Charlton Athletic U18s 10–0 Milton Keynes Dons U18s (31 March 2012)
- Biggest away win: Middlesbrough U18s 1–6 Derby County U18s (8 October 2011); Sheffield United U18s 1–6 Leeds United U18s (15 October 2011); Milton Keynes Dons U18s 2–7 Coventry City U18s (29 October 2011); West Ham United U18s 1–6 Reading U18s (17 March 2012)
- Highest scoring: Aston Villa U18 11–3 Milton Keynes Dons U18s (15 October 2011); Tottenham Hotspur U18s 11–3 Milton Keynes Dons U18s (5 November 2011)

The 2011–12 Premier Academy League Under–18 season is the fifteenth edition since the establishment of The Premier Academy League, and the eighth under the current make-up.

All teams played the other teams in their group twice and play 10 inter-group fixtures, producing 28 games a season. Winners of each group qualify for the play-offs.

== League tables ==
Updated as of 28 April 2012

=== Academy Group A ===
Pos	Club	Pld	W	D	L	GF	GA	GD	Pts
1	Fulham U18s	28	18	0	10	73	48	+25	54
2	Southampton U18s	28	15	8	5	59	30	+29	53
3	Arsenal U18s	28	16	4	8	56	37	+19	52
4	Charlton Athletic U18s	28	15	5	8	58	32	+26	50
5	West Ham United U18s	28	14	4	10	55	45	+10	46
6	Crystal Palace U18s	28	13	5	10	47	46	+1	44
7	Chelsea U18s	28	12	6	10	55	48	+7	42
8	Norwich City U18s	28	10	3	15	47	53	-6	33
9	Portsmouth U18s	28	6	6	16	33	60	-27	24
10	Ipswich Town U18s	28	5	7	16	37	61	-24	22

=== Academy Group B ===
Pos	Club	Pld	W	D	L	GF	GA	GD	Pts
1	Leicester City U18s	28	17	6	5	75	50	+25	57
2	Coventry City U18s	28	17	5	6	56	38	+18	56
3	Reading U18s	28	15	9	4	63	39	+27	54
4	Tottenham Hotspur U18s	28	13	8	7	71	53	+18	47
5	Aston Villa U18s	28	11	7	10	64	52	+12	40
6	Cardiff City U18s	28	7	6	15	37	52	-15	27
7	Watford U18s	28	6	8	14	34	56	-22	26
8	Birmingham City U18s	28	7	4	17	28	54	-26	25
9	Milton Keynes Dons U18s	28	4	6	18	49	107	-58	18
10	Bristol City U18s	28	4	5	19	28	55	-27	17

=== Academy Group C ===
Pos	Club	Pld	W	D	L	GF	GA	GD	Pts
1	Blackburn Rovers U18s	28	17	5	6	55	39	+16	56
2	Manchester City U18s	28	17	3	8	60	41	+19	54
3	Liverpool U18s	28	15	6	7	53	37	+16	51
4	Wolverhampton Wanderers U18s	28	15	3	10	60	50	+10	48
5	Everton U18s	28	13	4	11	60	45	+15	43
6	Stoke City U18s	26	11	7	8	41	37	+4	40
7	Bolton Wanderers U18s	28	9	5	14	41	48	-7	32
8	Crewe Alexandra U18s	27	8	5	14	38	57	-19	29
9	West Bromwich Albion U18s	27	7	4	16	37	60	-23	25
10	Manchester United U18s	24	6	6	12	43	52	-9	24

=== Academy Group D ===
Pos	Club	Pld	W	D	L	GF	GA	GD	Pts
1	Newcastle United U18s	28	17	4	7	59	39	+20	55
2	Leeds United U18s	28	16	5	7	60	31	+29	53
3	Derby County U18s	28	12	6	10	54	45	+12	42
4	Barnsley U18s	28	12	5	11	44	36	+8	41
5	Sheffield United U18s	28	11	6	11	41	45	-4	39
6	Sunderland U18s	28	11	5	12	50	51	-1	38
7	Middlesbrough U18s	28	11	4	13	41	54	-13	37
8	Sheffield Wednesday U18s	28	7	5	16	34	59	-25	26
9	Huddersfield Town U18s	28	5	8	15	35	65	-30	23
10	Nottingham Forest U18s	28	5	5	18	36	64	-28	20

Rules for classification: 1st points; 2nd goal difference; 3rd goals scored
Pos = Position; Pld = Matches played; W = Matches won; D = Matches drawn; L = Matches lost; GF = Goals for; GA = Goals against; GD = Goal difference; Pts = Points
Q = Qualified for playoffs; C = Champions

== Play-off semi-finals ==
5 May 2012

Fulham U18s	2–1	Leicester City U18s
Cauley Woodrow 39'; Ryan Williams 84'		Harry Panayiotou 25'

Motspur Park, New Malden

5 May 2012

Blackburn Rovers U18s	2–0	Newcastle United U18s
John O'Sullivan 2', 38'	Report

Brockhall, Brockhall Village

== Play-off Final ==
12 May 2012
14:00 GMT

Fulham U18s	2–0	Blackburn Rovers U18s
Cauley Woodrow 55'; Ryan Williams 83'	Report 1 Report 2

Craven Cottage, Fulham
Attendance: 1,000

== See also ==
- 2011–12 Premier Reserve League
- 2011–12 FA Youth Cup
- 2011–12 Premier League
- 2011–12 in English football

Match reports can be found at each club's official website:
Group A	Group B	Group C	Group D
Arsenal; Charlton Athletic; Chelsea; Crystal Palace; Fulham; Ipswich Town; Norwich City; Portsmouth; Southampton; West Ham United	Aston Villa; Birmingham City; Bristol City; Cardiff City; Coventry City; Leicester City; Milton Keynes Dons; Reading; Tottenham Hotspur; Watford	Blackburn Rovers; Bolton Wanderers; Crewe Alexandra; Everton; Liverpool; Manchester City; Manchester United; Stoke City; West Bromwich Albion; Wolverhampton Wanderers	Barnsley; Derby County; Huddersfield Town; Leeds United; Middlesbrough; Newcastle United; Nottingham Forest; Sheffield United; Sheffield Wednesday; Sunderland
