= Josh McEachran =

English footballer (born 1993)

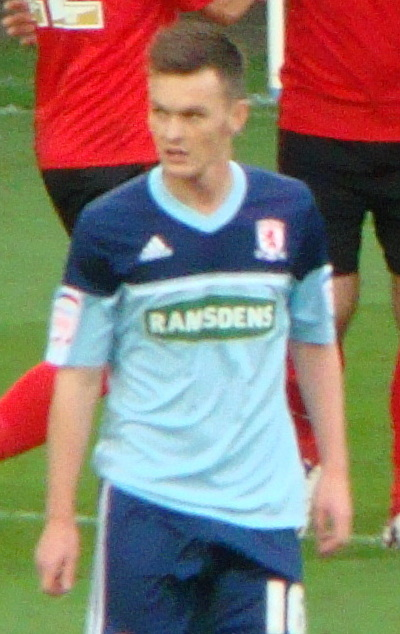
- McEachran playing for Middlesbrough in 2012

Personal information
- Full name: Joshua Mark McEachran
- Date of birth: 1 March 1993 (age 33)
- Place of birth: Oxford, England
- Height: 5 ft 10 in (1.78 m)
- Position: Midfielder

Youth career
- 2001–2010: Chelsea

Senior career*
Years	Team	Apps	(Gls)
2010–2015	Chelsea	11	(0)
2012	→ Swansea City (loan)	4	(0)
2012–2013	→ Middlesbrough (loan)	38	(0)
2013–2014	→ Watford (loan)	7	(0)
2014	→ Wigan Athletic (loan)	8	(0)
2014–2015	→ Vitesse (loan)	15	(0)
2015–2019	Brentford	90	(1)
2019–2021	Birmingham City	8	(0)
2021–2023	Milton Keynes Dons	88	(0)
2023–2025	Oxford United	36	(0)
2025–2026	Bristol Rovers	21	(1)

International career
2007–2009	England U16	5	(0)
2009–2010	England U17	12	(1)
2010–2011	England U19	6	(1)
2014	England U20	2	(0)
2010–2013	England U21	13	(1)
Medal record
Men's football
Representing England
UEFA European Under-17 Championship
Winner	2010 Liechtenstein
- * Club domestic league appearances and goals as of 5 August 2026 (UTC)

Joshua Mark McEachran (born 1 March 1993) is an English professional footballer who plays as a midfielder.

McEachran is a product of the Chelsea academy and won 38 caps and scored three goals for England at youth level. He spent several years with Chelsea as a professional but played little, and spent time on loan with clubs at both home and abroad. He moved on to Brentford in 2015, playing 90 league matches over four seasons, and spent 16 months with Birmingham City; both spells were disrupted by injury. He describes his midfield style as "a holder and a passer, dictating play".

== Club career ==
=== Chelsea ===
==== Reserves and youth ====
A midfielder, McEachran began playing football for Garden City in the Oxford Mail Boys League, where he was spotted by a Chelsea scout. He joined the Blues' academy at the age of seven. He signed a two-year scholarship deal before the beginning of the 2009–10 season and helped the Blues' youth team win the FA Youth Cup for the first time in 50 years. Their achievement meant that the entire squad collectively won Chelsea's Young Player of the Year award. He also broke into the reserve team and made 9 Premier Reserve League appearances. McEachran made 10 Premier Reserve League appearances during the 2010–11 season, helping the team to first place in the Premier Reserve League South, though he did not feature in the knockout stage, which Chelsea won, to win the league outright. He made sporadic appearances for the reserves during the 2011–12 and 2013–14 seasons.

==== First team ====
McEachran received his first exposure to the first team during the 2009–10 season, when he travelled with the squad to a League Cup fifth round match versus Blackburn Rovers in December 2009, and he trained with the first team throughout the first half of 2010. McEachran was named in Chelsea's Champions League squad for the 2010–11 season and received his maiden call when he was named as a substitute for a group stage match versus MŠK Žilina on 15 September 2010. He made his senior debut when he replaced Yossi Benayoun after 79 minutes of the 4–1 victory. He became the first player born after the Champions League began on 25 November 1992 to take part in the competition. McEachran made his Premier League debut on 25 September in a 1–0 defeat to Manchester City, replacing Ramires after 81 minutes. He made his first Chelsea start in the return Champions League match against Žilina on 23 November and also started the Blues' dead rubber group stage match versus Marseille on 8 December, completing his first 90 minutes for the club. With manager Carlo Ancelotti preferring to use him in a deep midfield role, he went on to make 17 appearances in his debut season. In recognition of his performances, McEachran was awarded the Chelsea Young Player of The Year award on 19 May 2011. McEachran's regular inclusion in the squad was viewed by pundits as a suggestion that the Chelsea administration recognised the importance of younger players in an otherwise ageing team.

On 15 July 2011, McEachran signed a new five-year contract and scored his first senior goal for the club in the friendly 2011 Premier League Asia Trophy final versus Aston Villa two weeks later. McEachran made just five appearances during the 2011–12 season and was frozen out by new manager André Villas-Boas. From January 2012 onwards, he spent much of his subsequent Chelsea career away on loan and was not called into a squad before departing from Stamford Bridge on 10 July 2015. McEachran made 22 appearances and scored no goals during five seasons as a senior player at Chelsea.

==== Loan to Swansea City ====
On 17 January 2012, McEachran completed a loan move to Premier League newcomers Swansea City until the end of the 2011–12 season. The move reunited him with Brendan Rodgers, his former Chelsea youth and reserve team manager. He made his debut in a 2–0 defeat to Sunderland on 21 January, coming off the bench in the 66th minute for Gylfi Sigurðsson. McEachran made his first start for the Swans in a FA Cup fourth round match against Bolton Wanderers, playing the full 90 minutes of the 2–1 defeat. After dropping back to the bench, he finished his spell with just five appearances. Looking back in January 2013, McEachran revealed that the move was "one of those things in life which just didn't work out" and that he learned "nothing" during his spell.

==== Loan to Middlesbrough ====
On 20 August 2012, McEachran joined Championship club Middlesbrough on loan for the entirety of the 2012–13 season. He made his debut for Middlesbrough the next day, playing the full 90 minutes of a 3–2 victory over Burnley. He became regular for Boro, creating a strong midfield partnership with Grant Leadbitter and also playing on the left of midfield, though an ankle injury picked up on international duty hampered his progress in the second half of the season. He made 38 appearances during a season in which Middlesbrough challenged for a playoff place, but drifted well out of contention. McEachran was voted by the Boro supporters as the club's Young Player of the Year.

==== Loan to Watford ====
On 20 September 2013, McEachran joined Championship side Watford on loan until 2 January 2014, with an option to extend the loan until the end of the 2013–14 season. His debut came four days later with a start in the League Cup third round versus Norwich City, but he was substituted for Connor Smith on 38 minutes after suffering a back spasm. McEachran made just eight appearances for Watford before returning to Stamford Bridge when his initial loan expired.

==== Loan to Wigan Athletic ====
On 23 January 2014, McEachran signed with Championship club Wigan Athletic on loan until the end of the 2013–14 season. The Manchester Evening News reported that he had taken a wage cut to go to the DW Stadium and manager Uwe Rösler commented that McEachran was "not at his best, so we have to make sure he recovers form, he recovers confidence and he is capable of performing consistently at a high tempo in the modern way of football". McEachran began his spell with regular substitute appearances and after building up his fitness he made something of a breakthrough into the starting lineup, making seven starts from late February through to the end of the season. He started in the Latics' FA Cup quarter-final and semi-final matches versus Manchester City and Arsenal respectively, though his first Wembley appearance in the latter match ended after a shootout defeat. After a fifth-place finish in the Championship saw the Latics qualify for the playoffs, he was left out of the squad for both legs of the semi-finals versus Queens Park Rangers, which resulted in a 2–1 aggregate defeat. McEachran finished his spell with 11 appearances.

==== Loan to Vitesse ====
On 17 August 2014, it was announced that McEachran had joined Dutch Eredivisie club Vitesse Arnhem on loan until the end of the 2014–15 season. One week later, McEachran made his debut, coming off the bench in the 74th minute for Marko Vejinović during a 2–1 defeat to PEC Zwolle. Either side of an ankle injury suffered in October, McEachran made sporadic appearances and spent time in the reserves, before breaking into the starting lineup in April 2015. Suspensions to Marko Vejinović and Davy Pröpper opened up a spot in midfield and McEachran made eight starts through to the end of the season. Four of those starts came in the Eredivisie European competition playoffs, with McEachran helping Vitesse to see off PEC Zwolle and Heerenveen to qualify for a place in the 2015–16 UEFA Europa League third qualifying round. He finished the campaign with 21 appearances.

=== Brentford ===
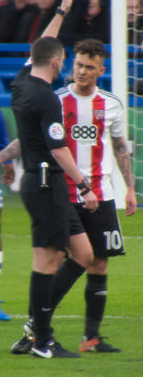
McEachran (right) contesting a decision made against Brentford by referee Michael Oliver in 2017

On 10 July 2015, McEachran signed for Championship club Brentford on a four-year contract for an undisclosed fee, reported to be £750,000. On 25 July, it was announced that McEachran would be out for three months after suffering a fractured foot in a collision in training with Toumani Diagouraga. He finally made his debut as a substitute versus Cardiff City on 15 December and made his first start in a 2–1 victory over Reading two weeks later. By mid-January 2016, McEachran was an ever-present starter and made 15 further appearances before his season was ended through a re-fracture of his foot during a training session on 24 March 2016. He began the 2016–17 pre-season fully fit, but again injuries and fitness problems prevented him from holding down a starting place once the regular season got underway. By January 2017, McEachran had broken into the starting lineup and was showing his best form since joining the club, but he was ruled out for the rest of the season after suffering an ankle ligament injury during a 2–1 win over Sheffield Wednesday on 21 February.

McEachran returned fit for the 2017–18 pre-season, but managed just four appearances early in the regular season before suffering a leg injury during a 2–2 draw with Bristol City on 15 August 2017. He returned to match play one month later and alternated between a starting and a substitute role until the end of the season, which he finished with 28 appearances. McEachran began the 2018–19 season as an ever-present starter in league matches and scored the first professional goal of his career with the equaliser in a 1–1 draw with Birmingham City on 2 October 2018. He reverted to a substitute role after Kamohelo Mokotjo's return from injury in early December after making 28 appearances during the season, and was dropped from the squad entirely in early April 2019. McEachran turned down a new contract and departed Griffin Park in June 2019. He finished his Brentford career with 101 appearances and one goal.

=== Birmingham City ===
On 27 September 2019, McEachran signed a two-year contract with Championship club Birmingham City on a free transfer. After spending several weeks regaining match fitness, he made his debut on 22 October as a second-half substitute in the Championship match against Blackburn Rovers which Birmingham won 1–0. He made nine appearances, including six starts, over the next three months, but 12 minutes into his seventh start, on 4 February 2020, he damaged his cruciate ligament. The knee required complex surgery, and he returned to fitness in November. In January 2021, he was one of three midfielders removed from the oversized first-team squad, and he left the club by mutual consent on 31 January.

=== Milton Keynes Dons ===
After training with the club, initially for fitness, McEachran signed a short-term contract with League One club Milton Keynes Dons on 1 March 2021 until the end of the season. On 29 July 2021, McEachran signed a new deal keeping him at the club for the 2021–22 season, and on 17 June 2022 extended his contract again taking him into his third season with the club.

=== Oxford United ===
McEachran joined League One club Oxford United on 1 July 2023 after his MK Dons contract expired. Following promotion through the play-offs, during which McEachran "played a pivotal role", he accepted a contract extension for the 2024–25 season. He was released at the end of that season.

=== Bristol Rovers ===
On 30 June 2025, McEachran joined League Two club Bristol Rovers on a two-year contract. On 14 September 2025, he scored just a second senior career goal, his first in almost seven years, seeing a speculative cross fly over the Barrow goalkeeper. He missed large parts of his first season with the club through injury, a double hernia injury ruling him out for the majority of November, before he failed to feature from 29 December until his return on 6 April.

Following the conclusion of the 2025–26 season, McEachran was one of seven players to be made available to depart the club. On 5 August 2026, he departed the club by mutual consent.

== International career ==
=== Youth ===
McEachran made his debut for the England U16 team aged just 14, with a start in a 2–2 Victory Shield draw with Northern Ireland on 11 October 2007. He went on to become captain of the team and also appeared in the 2008 event, but missed the final two games of the tournament through injury. In total, he won five under-16 caps, the last coming in a 3–1 victory over Russia in the opening match of the 2009 Montaigu Tournament.

McEachran received his first call into the U17 squad for the final 2009 European U17 Championship elite qualification match versus Hungary on 30 March 2009 and he started in a 2–0 victory, which saw England qualify for the finals. After failing to make the cut for the tournament finals, McEachran was a regular in qualification for the 2010 European U17 Championship and was included in the squad for the finals in Liechtenstein. He scored in the opening group match against the Czech Republic and helped the team through to the final and won his 12th and final cap in the final showdown with Spain, which England came from behind to win 2–1. McEachran was named in the Technical Team of the Tournament.

Fresh off the back of his success in the 2010 European U17 Championship, McEachran made his debut for the England under-19 team at the age of 17, in a 2–0 friendly victory over Slovakia on 2 September 2010. He scored his first goal for the team in the following match, a 6–1 rout of Albania in their opening 2011 European U19 Championship qualifier. He won a further four caps before his U19 career was cut short by England's failure to qualify for the tournament finals.

McEachran was named in England's under-20 squad for the 2014 Toulon Tournament and made two appearances as England finished the tournament in fourth place.

While still a regular for the U17s, McEachran won his first cap for the England under-21 team in a 2–0 friendly defeat to Germany on 16 November 2010, when he came on as a substitute for Nathan Delfouneso. He made his first competitive appearance for the team in England's opening 2013 European U21 Championship qualifier against Iceland on 6 October 2011, replacing Martyn Waghorn after 63 minutes, who had in turn replaced Delfouneso during the first half. He was a regular in the team through the qualification period and scored his only U21 goal with a penalty in a 4–0 friendly defeat of Austria on 25 March 2013. McEachran was a member of the squad for the 2013 European Under-21 Championship finals, and made two appearances before England were eliminated in the group stage.

=== Senior ===
In August 2011, it was reported that England manager Fabio Capello was monitoring McEachran's progress. Because his maternal grandfather is Scottish, McEachran is also eligible to represent Scotland. When the Scottish Football Association approached him in February 2012, he did not express any desire to switch his footballing allegiance. He was named in the 80-man shortlist for the Great Britain football team to play in the 2012 Olympic Games, but was not named in the final squad.

== Style of play ==
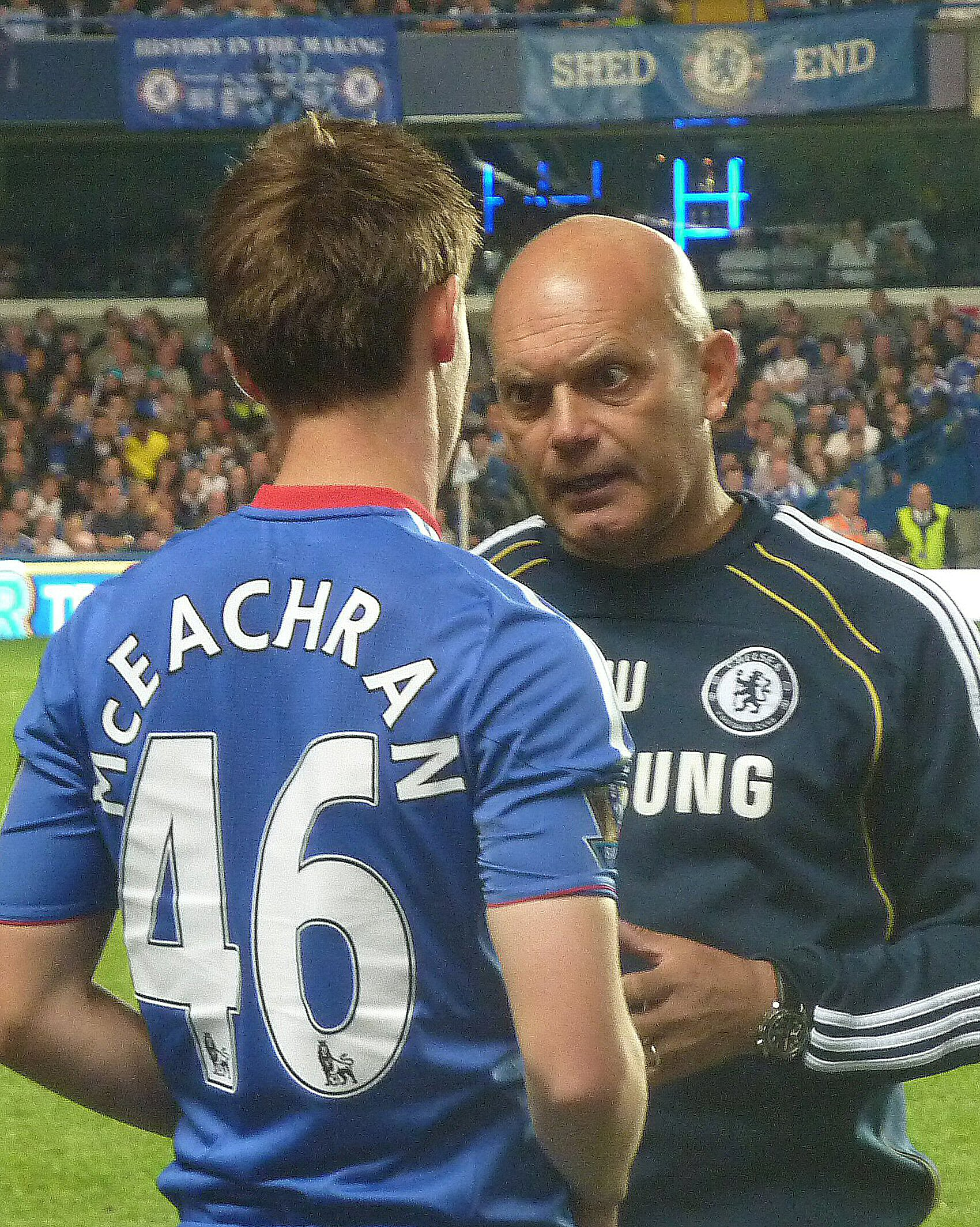
McEachran receiving advice from Chelsea assistant manager Ray Wilkins in 2010

A central midfielder, McEachran idolised Zinedine Zidane growing up and commented "it was everything about him, his goals, his touches. He was the complete all-round midfielder". When Zidane retired in 2006, McEachran looked up to Andrés Iniesta. Ray Wilkins and Stuart Pearce have commended on McEachran's incisive passing, while André Villas-Boas and Brendan Rodgers have lauded his vision on the pitch and technical abilities, comparing him to Luka Modrić, Jack Wilshere and Samir Nasri. Peter Bosz commented in 2015 that McEachran "needs to improve his defensive play", but "will certainly be a player at a good level".

== Personal life ==
McEachran was born in Oxford and raised in Kirtlington, Oxfordshire; he attended Kirtlington Primary School and Marlborough School in Woodstock. His parents, Mark and Julie, have four other children: Danielle, Zac, Will and George. Zac trained with Chelsea's academy up to under-14 level and has since played non-League football for Oxfordshire clubs Oxford City and Banbury United, while George turned professional with Chelsea and was a member of England's 2017 FIFA U-17 World Cup-winning squad. Since August 2016, McEachran has been in a relationship with Lillie Lexie Gregg; the couple's first child, a son, was born in 2018.

== Career statistics ==
As of end of 2025–26 season

Appearances and goals by club, season and competition
Season	Club	League			National cup (Note: Includes FA Cup, KNVB Beker)		League cup (Note: Includes Football League Cup/EFL Cup)		Other		Total	
Season	Club	Division	Apps	Goals	Apps	Goals	Apps	Goals	Apps	Goals	Apps	Goals
Chelsea	2010–11	Premier League	9	0	1	0	1	0	6 (Note: Appearances in UEFA Champions League)	0	17	0
Chelsea	2011–12	Premier League	2	0	0	0	3	0	0	0	5	0
Chelsea	Total		11	0	1	0	4	0	6	0	22	0
Swansea City (loan)	2011–12	Premier League	4	0	1	0	—		—		5	0
Middlesbrough (loan)	2012–13	Championship	38	0	0	0	0	0	—		38	0
Watford (loan)	2013–14	Championship	7	0	—		1	0	—		8	0
Wigan Athletic (loan)	2013–14	Championship	8	0	3	0	—		0	0	11	0
Vitesse (loan)	2014–15	Eredivisie	15	0	2	0	—		4 (Note: Appearances in European qualification play-offs)	0	21	0
Brentford	2015–16	Championship	14	0	1	0	0	0	—		15	0
Brentford	2016–17	Championship	27	0	2	0	0	0	—		29	0
Brentford	2017–18 (Note: Soccerbase credit McEachran with a substitute appearance in Brentford's match against Cardiff City on 13 March 2018 which was actually made by Lewis Macleod (they also list it among Macleod's appearances). See Brentford's match report.)	Championship	25	0	1	0	2	0	—		28	0
Brentford	2018–19	Championship	24	1	4	0	1	0	—		29	1
Brentford	Total		90	1	8	0	3	0	—		101	1
Birmingham City	2019–20	Championship	8	0	2	0	—		—		10	0
Birmingham City	2020–21	Championship	0	0	0	0	0	0	—		0	0
Birmingham City	Total		8	0	2	0	0	0	—		10	0
Milton Keynes Dons	2020–21	League One	14	0	—		—		—		14	0
Milton Keynes Dons	2021–22	League One	35	0	2	0	0	0	6 (Note: Five appearances in EFL Trophy, one appearance in League One play-offs)	0	43	0
Milton Keynes Dons	2022–23	League One	39	0	2	0	1	0	1 (Note: Appearance(s) in EFL Trophy)	0	43	0
Milton Keynes Dons	Total		88	0	4	0	1	0	7	0	100	0
Oxford United	2023–24	League One	24	0	3	0	0	0	7 (Note: Five appearances in EFL Trophy, two in League One play-offs)	0	34	0
Oxford United	2024–25	Championship	12	0	1	0	2	0	0	0	15	0
Oxford United	Total		36	0	4	0	2	0	7	0	49	0
Bristol Rovers	2025–26	League Two	21	1	1	0	0	0	1	0	23	1
Career total			326	2	27	0	11	0	24	0	388	2

== Honours ==
Chelsea Reserves

- Premier Reserve League: 2010–11
- FA Youth Cup: 2009–10

Oxford United

- EFL League One play-offs: 2024

England U16

- Victory Shield : 2007

England U17

- UEFA European Under-17 Championship: 2010

Individual

- UEFA European Under-17 Championship Technical Team of the Tournament: 2010
- Oxfordshire Sport Sportsman of the Year: 2010
- Chelsea Young Player of the Year: 2010–11
- Middlesbrough Young Player of the Year: 2012–13
