= Premier Academy League =

Former association football league in England

- Founded: 1997
- Folded: 2012
- Country: England
- Divisions: 4
- Number of clubs: 40
- Relegation to: Football League Youth Alliance
- Domestic cup: FA Youth Cup
- Last champions: Fulham (2nd title) (2011–12)
- Most championships: Arsenal (5 titles)

The Premier Academy League (sometimes abbreviated as FAPAL) was the top level of youth football in England before it was to be replaced by a new league proposed by the Elite Player Performance Plan in 2012, which was accepted by the 72 member clubs of The Football League on 20 October 2011. This newly formed league was established in the 2015–2016 season and given the renamed title of the Professional Development League It was contested between the Academy sides of the Premier League and some Football League clubs. It sat above the second tier of youth football, The Football League Youth Alliance, which is for the remaining Football League clubs and some Football Conference clubs with a Centre of Excellence. The most successful team is Arsenal, having won 5 titles.

== History ==
The league was founded as the FA Premier Youth League in 1997, replacing regionally based youth leagues such as the South East Counties League as the top level of youth football. Clubs fielded Under-18 teams, with up to three Under-19 players allowed per match. 16 teams were split into Northern and Southern conferences of 8 teams each; teams played others within their own conference twice and teams from the other conference once. At the end of the season all the teams were paired into rounds of play-offs played over two legs in a knockout system. The inaugural winners were Arsenal, who beat Tottenham Hotspur 2–1 on aggregate in the final.

The competition was revamped in 1998 with the introduction of the Football Association's Academy system and renamed the Premier Academy League. The competition was divided into Under-19 and Under-17 sections, and more teams were admitted - 32 in total, split into four conferences (two Southern, two Northern) of eight teams each. Teams played those within their own conference twice and the team from the other conference in their region once, again with play-offs between all teams at the end.

The U19 competition was expanded to 40 teams in five groups of 8 in 1999–2000, before being reorganised into four groups of ten in 2000–01. The play-off format was revamped in 2003–04, with only the four group winners proceeding to the play-offs.

The league was reorganised yet again in 2004–05 season, with the league being reformed as a single Under-18 competition (players are aged under 18 on the preceding 31 August), with up to 3 Under-19 outfield players and 1 Under-19 goalkeeper allowed per team per match. Teams also competed at an Under-16 level in identically formed groups, but these were played as friendlies – no league table was maintained and no play-offs were contested. This format remained until the league's abandonment in 2012.

== Structure ==
All teams played each other in the group twice and played 10 inter-group fixtures, producing 28 games a season. The four group winners entered the playoffs, which was a straight knockout format. Unlike the Premier Reserve League, the Premier Academy League was open to more than just the Premier League clubs.

== Winners ==
	FA Premier Youth League (Under-18)		References
1997–98	Arsenal U18s		
	FA Premier Academy League		
	Under-19	Under-17	
1998–99	West Ham United U19s	Blackburn Rovers U17s	
1999–2000	West Ham United U19s	Arsenal U17s	
2000–01	Nottingham Forest U19s	Ipswich Town U17s	
2001–02	Arsenal U19s	Newcastle United U17s	
2002–03	Blackburn Rovers U19s	Leeds United U17s	
2003–04	Southampton U19s	Aston Villa U17s	
	Premier Academy League (Under-18)		
2004–05	Blackburn Rovers U18s		
2005–06	Southampton U18s		
2006–07	Leicester City U18s		
2007–08	Aston Villa U18s		
2008–09	Arsenal U18s		
2009–10	Arsenal U18s		
2010–11	Everton U18s		
2011–12	Fulham U18s		

=== Most successful clubs ===
Team	U18 titles	U19 (d) titles	U17 (d) titles
Arsenal	3	1	1
Blackburn Rovers	1	1	1
Aston Villa	1		1
Southampton	1	1	
Everton	1		
Fulham	1		
West Ham United		2	
Nottingham Forest		1	
Leicester City	1		
Ipswich Town			1
Newcastle United			1
Leeds United			1

(d) - defunct

== See also ==
- Premier Reserve League
- FA Youth Cup
- Football League Youth Alliance
- Premier League
- The Football League
- Elite Player Performance Plan
