= 2011–12 FA Youth Cup =

Tournament details
- Teams: 460

Final positions
- Champions: Chelsea (4th Title)
- Runners-up: Blackburn Rovers (3rd Runner Up Finish)

The FA Youth Cup 2011–12 was the 60th edition of the FA Youth Cup.

The competition consisted of several rounds and was preceded by a qualifying competition, starting with the preliminary round which was followed by four qualifying rounds for non-League teams. Football League teams entered the draw thereafter, with League One and League Two teams entering at the first round, and Premier League and Championship teams entering in the third round. The competition was won by Chelsea.

== Calendar ==
Round	matches played from	matches	Clubs
First round	5 November 2011	40	124 → 84
Second round	19 November 2011	20	84 → 64
Third round	17 December 2011	32	64 → 32
Fourth round	21 January 2012	16	32 → 16
Fifth round	11 February 2012	8	16 → 8
Sixth round	25 February 2012	4	8 → 4
Semi-finals (two legs)	17 March & 31 March 2012	4	4 → 2
Final (two legs)	TBC	2	2 → 1

== Fixtures and results ==
=== First round ===
Tie no	Home team	Score	Away team	Attendance
1	Farnborough	1–3	Yeovil Town	114
2	Soham Town Rangers	0–9	Charlton Athletic	509
3	Stratford Town	2–3	Port Vale	260
4	Tranmere Rovers	1–2	Sheffield United	237
5	Hereford United	5–3	Halesowen Town	130
6	Aldershot Town	3–2	Kingstonian	102
7	Tilbury	0–3	Stevenage	299
8	Darlington	7–1	Sheffield	85
9	Kidderminster Harriers	4–2	Brighouse Town	128
10	Ebbsfleet United	1–2	Dulwich Hamlet	133
11	Uxbridge	1–3	AFC Wimbledon	160
12	Cirencester Town	3–1	Camberley Town	75
13	York City	1–3	Macclesfield Town	231
14	Brentford	3–0	Lewes	265
15	Thurrock	2–0	Boreham Wood	80
16	AFC Totton	3–2	Exeter City	111
17	Rotherham United	0–1	Accrington Stanley	154
18	Morecambe	0–3	Preston North End	210
19	Crawley Town	5–1	Wycombe Wanderers	254
20	Cheltenham Town	1–3	Oxford United	246

Tie no	Home team	Score	Away team	Attendance
21	Southend United	4–0	Corinthian	271
22	Bradford City	3–2	Marine	236
23	Gillingham	0–1	Hayes & Yeading United	380
24	Swindon Town	2–0	Newport County	304
25	Bristol Rovers	4–1	Maidenhead United	210
26	North Ferriby United	0–4	Crewe Alexandra	278
27	Hartlepool United	1–3	Bury	144
28	Rochdale	2–3	Oldham Athletic	505
29	Carlisle United	4–1	Sheffield Wednesday	182
30	Shrewsbury Town	2–0	Notts County	197
31	Northampton Town	2–3	Cambridge United	332
32	Leyton Orient	4–3	Dereham Town	366
33	Dagenham & Redbridge	3–2	Barnet	329
34	AFC Bournemouth	4–2	Plymouth Argyle	348
35	Burton Albion	1–3	Boston United	199
36	Corby Town	2–0	Colchester United	100
37	Bishop's Cleeve	1–3	Torquay United	84
38	Scunthorpe United	1–2	Huddersfield Town	237
39	Milton Keynes Dons	0–1	Walsall	556
40	Chesterfield	7–0	Tamworth	170

=== Second round ===
Tie no	Home team	Score	Away team	Attendance
1	Aldershot Town	3–1	AFC Totton	79
2	Preston North End	1–1	Walsall	308
Preston North End advance 5–4 on penalties
3	Thurrock	2–0	Hayes & Yeading United	104
4	Huddersfield Town	2–1	Crewe Alexandra	248
5	Oldham Athletic	1–1	Macclesfield Town	190
Oldham Athletic advance 6–5 on penalties
6	Charlton Athletic	3–0	Yeovil Town	230
7	Sheffield United	2–2	Port Vale	575
Sheffield United advance 8–7 on penalties
8	Dulwich Hamlet	0–2	Oxford United	138
9	Kidderminster Harriers	0–1	Carlisle United	264
10	Stevenage	1–0	Leyton Orient	306

Tie no	Home team	Score	Away team	Attendance
11	Boston United	2–1	Bradford City	437
12	Hereford United	2–0	Chesterfield	160
13	AFC Wimbledon	1–2	Bristol Rovers	214
14	Southend United	1–2	Brentford	230
15	Bury	2–1	Accrington Stanley	100
16	Darlington	2–0	Shrewsbury Town	290
17	AFC Bournemouth	1–3	Swindon Town	385
18	Cambridge United	3–1	Crawley Town	166
19	Torquay United	1–1	Cirencester Town	154
Torquay United advance 3–1 on penalties
20	Corby Town	2–2	Dagenham & Redbridge	142
Corby Town advance 3–2 on penalties

=== Third round ===
Tie no	Home team	Score	Away team	Attendance
1	Stevenage	1–2	Tottenham Hotspur	865
2	Bristol Rovers	2–3	Coventry City	235
3	Leicester City	5–0	Aldershot Town	287
4	Middlesbrough	1–2	Reading	387
5	Chelsea	2–1	Doncaster Rovers	482
6	Hull City	1–2	Brentford	
7	Arsenal	0–1	Derby County	393
8	Brighton & Hove Albion	1–0	Aston Villa	1,868
9	Norwich City	5–0	Oldham Athletic	340
10	Millwall	1–2	Watford	570
11	Preston North End	1–2	Stoke City	374
12	Crystal Palace	1–2	Everton	1,085
13	Fulham	3–1	Carlisle United	176
14	Swindon Town	3–2	Birmingham City	236
15	Southampton	7–0	Sheffield United	432
16	Newcastle United	3–0	Darlington	1,137

Tie no	Home team	Score	Away team	Attendance
17	Oxford United	1–2	Bolton Wanderers	451
18	Charlton Athletic	7–0	Cambridge United	211
19	Portsmouth	5–1	Bristol City	500
20	Peterborough United	3–1	Blackpool	608
21	Wolverhampton Wanderers	2–3	West Ham United	569
22	Queens Park Rangers	2–1	Huddersfield Town	639
23	Ipswich Town	2–0	Leeds United	696
24	Bury	2–3	Cardiff City	252
25	Swansea City	3–1	Liverpool	819
26	Boston United	0–7	Burnley	492
27	Blackburn Rovers	8–0	Thurrock	391
28	Manchester United	4–0	Torquay United	503
29	Wigan Athletic	4–0	Hereford United	128
30	Manchester City	4–1	Corby Town	240
31	Sunderland	1–2	Nottingham Forest	215
32	West Bromwich Albion	3–0	Barnsley	341

=== Fourth round ===
Tie no	Home team	Score	Away team	Attendance
1	Nottingham Forest	9–1	Wigan Athletic	676
2	Newcastle United	2–1	Watford	889
3	Charlton Athletic	2–1	Leicester City	346
4	Reading	1–2	West Bromwich Albion	1,402
5	Portsmouth	1–2	Swansea City	
6	Manchester United	2–1	Derby County	993
7	Blackburn Rovers	2–0	Coventry City	511
8	Swindon Town	1–4	Manchester City	1,601
9	Burnley	3–1	Ipswich Town	620

Tie no	Home team	Score	Away team	Attendance
10	Queens Park Rangers	1–0	Everton	803
11	Stoke City	2–1	Brentford	2,650
12	Peterborough United	1–5	Fulham	1,245
13	Bolton Wanderers	1–2	Southampton	953
14	Cardiff City	1–2	Tottenham Hotspur	1,309
15	Norwich City	0–0	Chelsea	1,099
Chelsea advance 4–2 on penalties
16	West Ham United	4–1	Brighton & Hove Albion	1,603

=== Fifth round ===
Tie no	Home team	Score	Away team	Attendance
1	Charlton Athletic	1–0	Tottenham Hotspur	1,371
2	Manchester City	1–2	Fulham	490
3	Chelsea	3–3	West Ham United	1,588
Chelsea advance 5–4 on penalties
4	Newcastle United	2–1	Queens Park Rangers	1,196

Tie no	Home team	Score	Away team	Attendance
5	West Bromwich Albion	1–2	Burnley	434
6	Blackburn Rovers	4–0	Stoke City	474
7	Swansea City	1–5	Manchester United	4,080
8	Southampton	1–5	Nottingham Forest	814

=== Quarter-finals ===
Tie no	Home team	Score	Away team	Attendance
1	Fulham	1–3	Burnley	1,047
2	Manchester United	3–2	Charlton Athletic	4,461
3	Newcastle United	2–2	Blackburn Rovers	2,026
Blackburn Rovers advance 3–0 on penalties
4	Nottingham Forest	3–4	Chelsea	1,263

=== Semi-finals ===
Team 1	Agg.	Team 2	1st leg	2nd leg
Manchester United	2–3	Chelsea	1–2	1 – 1
Blackburn Rovers	3–1	Burnley	1–0	2 – 1

==== First leg ====
16 March 2012
19:00

Manchester United	1–2	Chelsea
Wilson 62'		Affane 14'; Feruz 68'

Old Trafford, Manchester
Attendance: 7,802

22 March 2012
19:00

Blackburn Rovers	1–0	Burnley
Hanley 33'	Report

Ewood Park, Blackburn
Attendance: 10,069

==== Second leg ====
13 April 2012
19:00

Chelsea	1–1	Manchester United
Piazón 69'		Barmby 60'

Stamford Bridge, London
Attendance: 4,193

28 March 2012
19:00

Burnley	1–2	Blackburn Rovers
Hewitt 84' (pen.)	Report	Fernandez; Edwards

Turf Moor, Burnley
Attendance: 10,556
Referee: C. Pawson

=== Final ===
==== First leg ====
20 April 2012
19:00

Chelsea	4–0	Blackburn Rovers
Chalobah 19'; Baker 27'; Feruz 58', 68'	Report

Stamford Bridge, London
Attendance: 3,412

==== Second leg ====
9 May 2012
19:00

Blackburn Rovers	1–0	Chelsea
Payne 19'	Report

Ewood Park, Blackburn
Attendance: 1,490

== See also ==
- 2011–12 Premier Academy League
- 2011–12 Premier Reserve League
- 2011–12 FA Cup
- 2011–12 in English football
