= 2010–11 Premier Reserve League =

Premier Reserve League
- Season: 2010–11
- Champions: Chelsea Reserves
- Goals: 507
- Average goals/game: 3.23
- Top goalscorer: (Italy) Fabio Borini (12)
- Biggest home win: Aston Villa Reserves 10–1 Arsenal Reserves (10 January 2011)
- Biggest away win: Bolton Wanderers Reserves 0–5 Arsenal Reserves (25 August 2010)
- Highest scoring: Aston Villa Reserves 10–1 Arsenal Reserves (10 January 2011)
- Longest winning run: 5 games – Manchester United Reserves (21 March 2011 - 18 April 2011)
- Longest unbeaten run: 11 games – Aston Villa Reserves (6 September 2010 – 21 February 2011)
- Longest losing run: 6 games – Blackpool Reserves (14 March 2011 - 20 April 2011)
- Lowest attendance: 0 - Many (behind closed doors matches)

The 2010–11 Premier Reserve League (officially known as the 2010–11 Barclays Premier Reserve League for sponsorship reasons) was the twelfth season since the establishment of the Premier Reserve League. The season began on 25 August 2010. and ended on 16 May 2011 with Chelsea's reserves beating Blackburn Rovers Reserves 5–4 in a penalty shoot-out after the final had ended 1–1 after extra time.

The events in the senior leagues during the 2009–10 season saw Burnley, Hull City and Portsmouth all relegated and replaced by the promoted teams Newcastle United, West Bromwich Albion and Blackpool. In addition, Birmingham City, Stoke City, and Fulham decided to opt out of the 2010–11 reserve season.

That resulted in 2 major changes to the 2010–11 season. With the Southern section now only containing six teams, the Northern section was broken into two groups. Group A consisted of Bolton Wanderers, Manchester City, Manchester United, Newcastle United, and Wigan Athletic. Group B consisted of Blackburn Rovers, Blackpool, Everton, Liverpool, and Sunderland.

The second big change was to the fixture schedule. Each team played the teams in their own group twice (home and away) and played the teams from the other groups once. This meant each Northern side played a total of 19 games and the Southern sides played 20 games during the regular season.

At the conclusion of the league season, the two Northern winners faced a play off against each other with the winner facing the Southern champions in a one-off final.

== Tables ==
=== Premier Reserve League North Group A ===
Final table as of 5 May 2011

Pos	Club	Pld	W	D	L	F	A	GD	Pts
1	Manchester United Reserves (C)	19	9	8	2	38	24	+14	35
2	Manchester City Reserves	19	10	3	6	32	22	+10	33
3	Wigan Athletic Reserves	19	9	4	6	21	22	−1	31
4	Newcastle United Reserves	19	8	4	7	40	40	0	28
5	Bolton Wanderers Reserves	19	8	3	8	24	32	−8	27

=== Premier Reserve League North Group B ===
Final table as of 5 May 2011

Pos	Club	Pld	W	D	L	F	A	GD	Pts
1	Blackburn Rovers Reserves (C)	19	7	5	7	39	38	+1	26
2	Sunderland Reserves	19	6	6	7	29	27	+2	24
3	Liverpool Reserves	19	5	8	6	25	26	−1	23
4	Everton Reserves	19	4	3	12	23	34	−11	15
5	Blackpool Reserves	19	4	2	13	23	49	−26	14

=== Premier Reserve League South ===
Final table as of 9 May 2011

Pos	Club	Pld	W	D	L	F	A	GD	Pts
1	Chelsea Reserves (C)	20	11	3	6	42	39	+3	36
2	Arsenal Reserves	20	10	5	5	41	34	+7	35
3	Aston Villa Reserves	20	8	6	6	37	21	+16	30
4	West Ham United Reserves	20	8	4	8	31	30	+1	28
5	West Bromwich Albion Reserves	20	5	10	5	30	29	+1	25
6	Wolverhampton Wanderers Reserves	20	5	2	13	27	35	−8	17

Rules for classification: 1st points; 2nd goal difference; 3rd goals scored
Pos = Position; Pld = Matches played; W = Matches won; D = Matches drawn; L = Matches lost; F = Goals for; A = Goals against; GD = Goal difference; Pts = Points; C = Champions

== Play-offs ==
The play-offs were contested in two stages, first between the two winners of the Reserve League North divisions, and then between the winner of that game and the winner of the Reserve League South.

=== Semi-final ===
11 May 2011
19:00 BST

Manchester United Reserves	1–2	Blackburn Rovers Reserves
Davide Petrucci 65' (pen.)	Report 1 Report 2	Ruben Rochina 21', 31'

Old Trafford, Manchester
Attendance: 250
Referee: Dean Mohareb

=== Final ===
16 May 2011
19:05 BST

Chelsea Reserves	1–1	Blackburn Rovers Reserves
Todd Kane 80'		Mauro Formica 20'
Penalties
Conor Clifford (penalty scored); Gökhan Töre (penalty scored); Milan Lalkovič (penalty scored); Adam Phillip (penalty scored); Michael Woods (penalty scored)	5–4	(penalty scored) Josh Morris; (penalty scored) James Knowles; (penalty scored) Adam Parry; (penalty missed) Michael Potts; (penalty scored) Jason Lowe

Stamford Bridge, London
Referee: Mike Jones

== Top scorers ==
=== Premier Reserve League North Group A ===
Rank	Player	Team	Goals
1	(England) Phil Airey	Newcastle United Reserves	11
2	(Sweden) John Guidetti	Manchester City EDS	10
3	(England) Callum McManaman	Wigan Athletic Reserves	8
4	(England) Tope Obadeyi	Bolton Wanderers Reserves	6
4	(France) Gabriel Obertan	Manchester United Reserves	6
4	(England) Nile Ranger	Newcastle United Reserves	6
7	(Cape Verde) Bébé	Manchester United Reserves	5
7	(England) Adam Blakeman	Bolton Wanderers Reserves	5
7	(England) Tom Eaves	Bolton Wanderers Reserves	5
7	(Republic of Ireland) Will Keane	Manchester United Reserves	5
7	(Scotland) Michael O'Halloran	Bolton Wanderers Reserves	5
12	(Nigeria) Sammy Ameobi	Newcastle United Reserves	4
12	(Norway) Abdisalam Ibrahim	Manchester City EDS	4
12	(Norway) Joshua King	Manchester United Reserves	4
12	(England) Daniel Redmond	Wigan Athletic Reserves	4
16	(England) Harry Bunn	Manchester City EDS	3
16	(England) Ryan Donaldson	Newcastle United Reserves	3
16	(England) Joe Holt	Wigan Athletic Reserves	3
16	(Liberia) Alex Nimely	Manchester City EDS	3
16	(England) James Poole	Manchester City EDS	3
21	(England) Nicky Ajose	Manchester United Reserves	2
21	(Brazil) Anderson	Manchester United Reserves	2
21	(Republic of Ireland) Robbie Brady	Manchester United Reserves	2
21	(Italy) Andrea Mancini	Manchester City EDS	2
21	(Republic of Ireland) Donal McDermott	Manchester City EDS	2
21	(England) Greg McDermott	Newcastle United Reserves	2
21	(Northern Ireland) Paddy McLaughlin	Newcastle United Reserves	2
21	(Spain) Rodrigo Moreno	Bolton Wanderers Reserves	2
21	(Jamaica) Ravel Morrison	Manchester United Reserves	2
21	(Northern Ireland) Oliver Norwood	Manchester United Reserves	2
21	(England) James Perch	Newcastle United Reserves	2
21	(England) Michael Richardson	Newcastle United Reserves	2
33	Many players		1

=== Premier Reserve League North Group B ===
Rank	Player	Team	Goals
1	(England) Ryan Noble	Sunderland Reserves	7
1	(Spain) Rubén Rochina	Blackburn Rovers Reserves	7
3	(England) Jose Baxter	Everton Reserves	5
3	(Belarus) Sergei Kornilenko	Blackpool Reserves	5
3	(England) Craig Lynch	Sunderland Reserves	5
3	(England) Conor McAleny	Everton Reserves	5
7	(England) Nathan Eccleston	Liverpool Reserves	4
7	(Australia) Matthew Fletcher	Sunderland Reserves	4
7	(England) Tom Hitchcock	Blackburn Rovers Reserves	4
7	(England) Brett Ormerod	Blackpool Reserves	4
11	(England) David Amoo	Liverpool Reserves	3
11	(England) Jordan Cook	Sunderland Reserves	3
11	(England) Josh Morris	Blackburn Rovers Reserves	3
11	(Spain) Daniel Pacheco	Liverpool Reserves	3
11	(England) Matthew Pearson	Blackburn Rovers Reserves	3
11	(England) Michael Potts	Blackburn Rovers Reserves	3
11	(Grenada) Jason Roberts	Blackburn Rovers Reserves	3
11	(Denmark) Nikola Sarić	Liverpool Reserves	3
11	(Spain) Suso	Liverpool Reserves	3
11	(Greece) Apostolos Vellios	Everton Reserves	3
21	(Nigeria) Victor Anichebe	Everton Reserves	2
21	(England) James Beattie	Blackpool Reserves	2
21	(Argentina) Gerardo Bruna	Liverpool Reserves	2
21	(England) Ishmel Demontagnac	Blackpool Reserves	2
21	(England) David Dunn	Blackburn Rovers Reserves	2
21	(Argentina) Mauro Formica	Blackburn Rovers Reserves	2
21	(England) Adam Forshaw	Everton Reserves	2
21	(Senegal) Magaye Gueye	Everton Reserves	2
21	(Canada) Junior Hoilett	Blackburn Rovers Reserves	2
21	(France) Malaury Martin	Everton Reserves	2
21	(England) Nathan Wilson	Sunderland Reserves	2
32	Many players		1

=== Premier Reserve League South ===
Rank	Player	Team	Goals
1	(Italy) Fabio Borini	Chelsea Reserves	12
2	(England) Jay Emmanuel-Thomas	Arsenal Reserves	10
3	(England) Adam Phillip	Chelsea Reserves	8
4	(England) Nathan Delfouneso	Aston Villa Reserves	7
4	(Slovakia) Milan Lalkovič	Chelsea Reserves	7
6	(England) Chuks Aneke	Arsenal Reserves	6
6	(England) Gary Gardner	Aston Villa Reserves	6
6	(Belgium) Geoffrey Mujangi Bia	Wolves Reserves	6
9	(England) Luke Freeman	Arsenal Reserves	5
9	(England) Sam Mantom	West Bromwich Albion Reserves	5
9	(England) Sam Winnall	Wolves Reserves	5
12	(Republic of Ireland) Samir Carruthers	Aston Villa Reserves	4
12	(England) Roarie Deacon	Arsenal Reserves	4
12	(England) Zavon Hines	West Ham United Reserves	4
12	(Colombia) Cristian Montano	West Ham United Reserves	4
12	(England) Freddie Sears	West Ham United Reserves	4
12	(Australia) Dylan Tombides	West Ham United Reserves	4
12	(Turkey) Gökhan Töre	Chelsea Reserves	4
12	(New Zealand) Chris Wood	West Bromwich Albion Reserves	4
20	(Democratic Republic of the Congo) Benik Afobe	Arsenal Reserves	3
20	(Scotland) Barry Bannan	Aston Villa Reserves	3
20	(Republic of Ireland) James Collins	Aston Villa Reserves	3
20	(Republic of Ireland) Matt Doherty	Wolves Reserves	3
20	(England) Lateef Elford-Alliyu	West Bromwich Albion Reserves	3
20	(Australia) Chris Herd	Aston Villa Reserves	3
20	(England) Todd Kane	Chelsea Reserves	3
20	(South Africa) Benni McCarthy	West Ham United Reserves	3
20	(Republic of Ireland) Rhys Murphy	Arsenal Reserves	3
29	(Burundi) Saido Berahino	West Bromwich Albion Reserves	2
29	(Republic of Ireland) Graham Burke	Aston Villa Reserves	2
29	(England) Nathaniel Chalobah	Chelsea Reserves	2
29	(England) Billy Clifford	Chelsea Reserves	2
29	(England) Anthony Edgar	West Ham United Reserves	2
29	(Cameroon) George Elokobi	Wolves Reserves	2
29	(England) Ishmael Miller	West Bromwich Albion Reserves	2
29	(England) George Thorne	West Bromwich Albion Reserves	2
29	(Pakistan) Adil Nabi	West Bromwich Albion Reserves	2
29	(England) Joshua Rees	Arsenal Reserves	2
29	(Republic of Ireland) Nathan Rooney	Wolves Reserves	2
29	(England) James Spray	Wolves Reserves	2
29	(England) Junior Stanislas	West Ham United Reserves	2
29	(England) George Thorne	West Bromwich Albion Reserves	2
29	(Austria) Andreas Weimann	Aston Villa Reserves	2
44	Many players		1

== Promotion and relegation ==
- Teams relegated from the Premier Reserve League at the end of this season:
- Birmingham City F.C.
- Blackpool F.C.
- West Ham United F.C.
- Teams promoted to the Premier Reserve League at the end of this season:
- Queens Park Rangers F.C.
- Norwich City F.C.
- Swansea City A.F.C.

== See also ==
- 2010–11 Premier Academy League
- 2010–11 FA Youth Cup
- 2010–11 Premier League
- 2010–11 in English football

Premier Reserve Leagues North	Premier Reserve League South
Blackburn Rovers; Blackpool; Bolton Wanderers; Everton; Liverpool; Manchester City; Manchester United; Newcastle United; Sunderland; Wigan Athletic	Arsenal; Aston Villa; Chelsea; West Bromwich Albion; West Ham United; Wolverhampton Wanderers
