= Will Keane =

English footballer (born 1993)

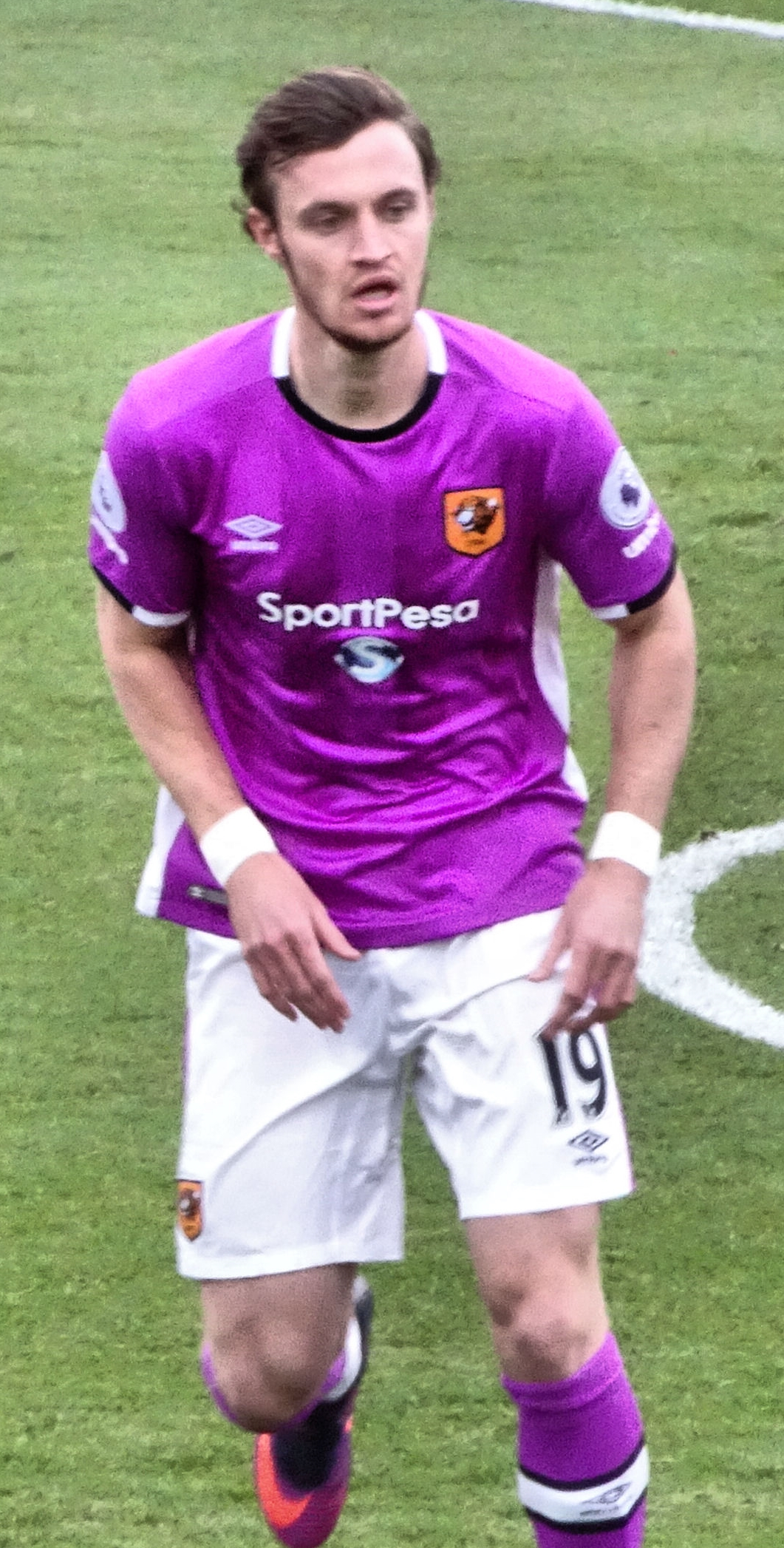
- Keane playing for Hull City in 2016

Personal information
- Full name: William David Keane
- Date of birth: 11 January 1993 (age 33)
- Place of birth: Stockport, England
- Height: 6 ft 2 in (1.88 m)
- Positions: Forward; attacking midfielder

Team information
- Current team: Doncaster Rovers
- Number: 18

Youth career
- South Manchester Juniors
- 2004–2011: Manchester United

Senior career*
Years	Team	Apps	(Gls)
2011–2016	Manchester United	2	(0)
2013	→ Wigan Athletic (loan)	4	(0)
2014	→ Queens Park Rangers (loan)	10	(0)
2015	→ Sheffield Wednesday (loan)	13	(3)
2015	→ Preston North End (loan)	20	(1)
2016–2019	Hull City	22	(1)
2019	→ Ipswich Town (loan)	11	(3)
2019–2020	Ipswich Town	23	(3)
2020–2023	Wigan Athletic	119	(48)
2023–2026	Preston North End	67	(17)
2026	→ Reading (loan)	14	(2)
2026–	Doncaster Rovers	4	(0)

International career^{‡}
2009	England U16	3	(1)
2009–2010	England U17	15	(3)
2010–2012	England U19	9	(3)
2014	England U20	3	(0)
2021–2023	Republic of Ireland	5	(0)
Medal record
Men's football
Representing England
UEFA European Under-17 Championship
Winner	2010 Liechtenstein
- * Club domestic league appearances and goals as of 23 October 2026 (UTC) ‡ National team caps and goals as of 22:27, 7 September 2023 (UTC)

William David Keane (born 11 January 1993) is a professional footballer who plays as a forward or attacking midfielder for EFL League One side Doncaster Rovers and the Republic of Ireland national team.

He began his career with Manchester United, having joined them at the age of 11, but made just three appearances for the first team and had loan spells with Wigan Athletic, Queens Park Rangers, Sheffield Wednesday and Preston North End before making a permanent move to Hull City in 2016. Following a loan spell at Ipswich Town in 2019, he was released by Hull at the end of the 2018–19 season. Keane joined Ipswich permanently on a one-year deal in August 2019.

Keane joined Wigan Athletic on a 3-month contract in October 2020 after his release by Ipswich. After scoring five goals in 12 appearances by January 2021, he was offered a contract until the end of the season. Keane then signed a new two-year deal with Latics ahead of the 2021–22 season.

In September 2021, at the age of 28, Keane was called up to the Republic of Ireland squad for the first time, having declared his interest in playing for Ireland in 2019. He qualifies for Ireland through his father.

His twin brother, Michael, is also a professional footballer who plays as a defender for Everton and England. Ironically, Michael became a full England international after a youth career with the Republic of Ireland whereas Will became a full Republic of Ireland international after a youth career with England.

== Early life ==
Born in Stockport, Greater Manchester, Keane and his twin brother Michael grew up in the suburb of Heaton Mersey and attended St Bede's College in south Manchester. They were spotted playing football for South Manchester by Manchester United at the age of 11, and soon joined the club's academy coaching system.

== Club career ==
=== Manchester United ===
Keane worked his way up through the Manchester United academy, and made his first appearance for the under-18s on 21 April 2007 against Sheffield United, a game in which both sides had agreed to field their under-16 teams; at the age of 14, Keane came on as a substitute for goalscorer Tomos Roberts in the 77th minute of a 4–0 away win. His next appearance for the under-18s came almost two years later, when he started in central midfield in a 1–0 home defeat to Stoke City on 21 February 2009. Shortly before their 16th birthday earlier in the year, both Keanes were awarded three-year scholarships with Manchester United, which began in July 2009.

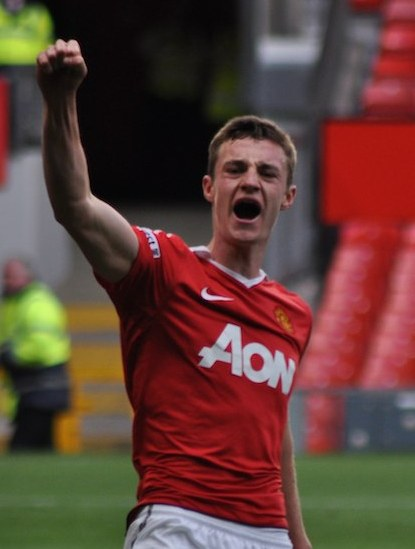
Keane celebrating a goal for Manchester United reserves in 2011

The following season, Keane became a regular starter for the under-18s, scoring 13 goals in 26 appearances in 2009–10, including all three goals in a 3–0 win at home to Manchester City; he also made several substitute appearances for the reserves. His reserve debut came as a substitute in a 1–0 league win away to Everton on 6 October 2009, and he scored his first goal five months later, in Manchester United's penultimate group match in the Manchester Senior Cup against Stockport County on 8 March 2010; after coming on for Nicky Ajose on the hour mark, Keane scored 14 minutes later to give Manchester United a 1–0 win.

At the end of the season, Keane made a substitute appearance for the reserves in the Premier Reserve League Play-off Final against Aston Villa. After the game finished 1–1, the teams went to penalties, where Keane missed United's third penalty in a 3–2 shoot-out victory to win the Premier Reserve League title. Keane's performances during the 2009–10 season saw him receive the Jimmy Murphy Young Player of the Year award.

Despite making just 17 appearances for the under-18s in 2010–11, Keane finished as the team's top scorer with 16 goals, including eight in just six FA Youth Cup matches – three in the semi-final second leg against Chelsea and three more over the two legs of the final against Sheffield United. He also scored six goals in 10 appearances for the reserves; only a missed penalty denied him a hat-trick in a 5–1 win over Newcastle United on 16 December 2010, Ole Gunnar Solskjær's final match as manager.

Keane was ever-present for the reserves in the league in 2011–12, scoring 14 times in 22 appearances, as well as four more in seven cup appearances. His best performance of the season came on 16 April 2012, when he scored four in a 6–3 win away to Newcastle United to confirm Manchester United as winners of the Premier Reserve League North. They again faced Aston Villa in the championship play-off, and again the match went to penalties, but this time Keane scored from his kick as United won 3–1. Keane was on the scoresheet again a week later as United made it a double with a 2–0 victory over Manchester City in the final of the Manchester Senior Cup.

After being named as an unused substitute for a 2–1 defeat to Wolverhampton Wanderers in the Premier League on 5 February 2011 and a 3–0 win over Aldershot Town in the fourth round of the 2011–12 Football League Cup on 25 October 2011, Keane made his senior debut on 31 December 2011 in a 3–2 defeat at home to Blackburn Rovers in the Premier League, coming on as a late substitute for Rafael.

A knee ligament injury suffered while on international duty with the England under-19s in May 2012 kept Keane out for the entire 2012–13 season. He made his return for the under-21s at home to Bolton Wanderers on 16 September 2013, scoring the first goal in a 4–1 win. Three more goals followed in the under-21s' next two matches, against Bury and Bolton in the Manchester Senior Cup.

==== Wigan Athletic (loan) ====
On 28 November 2013, Keane joined fellow Manchester United youngster Nick Powell on a one-month loan at Wigan Athletic. He made his debut at home to Derby County the following weekend, only to be replaced by Grant Holt at half-time with Wigan 3–0 down; they went on to lose the game 3–1. After failing to find the net in four appearances for Wigan, Keane returned to Manchester United in December 2013 having suffered a groin injury.

==== Queens Park Rangers (loan) ====
After recovering from injury, Keane made a loan move to Queens Park Rangers on 31 January 2014 until the end of the 2013–14 season. He made 10 appearances during the second half of the 2013–14 season as QPR won promotion to the Premier League through the Championship play-offs.

==== Sheffield Wednesday (loan) ====
On 22 January 2015 Keane joined Sheffield Wednesday on loan for the remainder of the season. He made his Wednesday debut on 27 January in a 0–0 draw at Hillsborough against Birmingham City. His first senior goal came from the penalty spot to draw level in the Owls' 1–1 home draw to Cardiff City on 7 February. He made 13 appearances during his loan at Sheffield Wednesday, scoring three goals.

==== Preston North End (loan) ====
On 8 July 2015, Keane signed on a season-long loan deal with Preston North End. On 31 December 2015, Manchester United recalled Keane from his loan. He made 22 appearances in all competitions during his loan spell at Deepdale, scoring twice.

=== Hull City ===
On 30 August 2016, Keane signed a permanent deal with Hull City; the player moved to the Tigers on a three-year deal, reuniting with ex-Manchester United assistant manager Mike Phelan. He made his debut on 10 September 2016 away to Burnley when he came off the bench to replace Adama Diomande after 70 minutes. On 6 November 2016, during a match against Southampton, Keane suffered the second serious knee ligament injury of his career, putting him out of action until January 2018. He scored his first goal for the club on 10 April 2018, the final goal in a 0–5 away win against Burton Albion.

==== Ipswich Town (loan) ====
On 4 January 2019, Keane signed for Ipswich Town on loan until the end of the season. He made his debut for the club as a second-half substitute in a 0–1 FA Cup away loss to Accrington Stanley at the Crown Ground. He scored his first goal for the club on his home debut in a 1–0 win over Rotherham United at Portman Road, on 12 January 2019. He made 12 appearances for the Tractor Boys during his loan spell, scoring three goals.

He was released by Hull City at the end of the 2018–19 season.

=== Ipswich Town ===
On 20 August 2019, Keane signed with Ipswich Town permanently on a free transfer. He signed a one-year contract, with the option of an additional 12 months. He made his first appearance following his return to the club as a second-half substitute in a 0–0 draw with Doncaster Rovers at Portman Road on 14 September. He scored his first goal of the season on 8 October, netting the fourth goal in a 4–0 home win over Gillingham in a group stage match of the EFL Trophy. Keane scored his first league goal of the season on 7 December in a 1–1 draw with Coventry City.

With football suspended due to the COVID-19 pandemic and with his contract expiring, on 18 May 2020 the club announced they had decided against taking up the additional 12-month option in Keane's contract, or offer him a new deal, and he subsequently left the club. He had scored six goals in 29 appearances in all competitions during the season.

=== Return to Wigan Athletic ===
On 9 October 2020, Keane joined Wigan Athletic on a short-term contract until 9 January 2021, as Latics rebuilt their squad after entering administration and suffering relegation from the Championship in the 2019–20 season. He made his debut a day later, starting in a 0–3 loss to Crewe Alexandra. He scored his first goal for Wigan on 24 October, scoring the equalising goal in a 1–1 draw with Plymouth Argyle.

On 15 January 2021, Keane signed a contract extension to keep him at the club for the rest of the season. By May, Keane had scored 11 goals in 34 games for Wigan in all competitions in the 2020–21 season.

In June 2021, Keane signed a new two-year contract with Wigan. In the 2021-22 EFL League One campaign, Keane would finish as top goalscorer with 26 goals.

=== Preston North End ===
In July 2023, Keane moved to Championship side Preston North End for an undisclosed fee.

He was Preston's top scorer in the 2023–24 season with 13 goals and had his contract extended at the end of that season until 2026.

On 20 December 2025, in his first game of the 2025–26 season after returning from injury, Keane scored the late equaliser in a 1–1 draw with Norwich City.

==== Reading (loan) ====
On 14 January 2026, Reading announced the signing of Keane on loan from Preston North End until the end of the season.

On 19 May 2026, Preston announced the player would be released in the summer when his contract expired

=== Doncaster Rovers ===
On 13 October 2026, Keane joined League One Doncaster Rovers on a short-term contract until January.

Keane then made his debut for Doncaster, in a 2–1 loss against Leicester City.

== International career ==
=== England youth ===
Born in England to an Irish father, Keane was eligible to play for either England or the Republic of Ireland. Keane debuted for the England under-16 team in a 3–1 win against Russia in 2009. He scored one goal in three appearances for the side. He was part of the England under-17 team that won the 2010 UEFA European Under-17 Football Championship, appearing in the final. He made a total of 15 appearances and scored three goals for the team. He then progressed to the under-19 side where he made six appearances and scored one goal.

He received a call up to the under-21 side managed by Stuart Pearce in November 2011, and received praise from Manchester United reserve team manager Warren Joyce, with Joyce saying Keane deserved the call up after his good form for the reserve team. He made his first appearance during a 5–0 win against Iceland, coming off the bench to replace midfielder Josh McEachran in the 78th minute. He appeared in the following game four days later against Belgium, this time coming on as a substitute for Marvin Sordell. On 25 May 2012, he scored twice as England under-19s beat Slovenia 5–0 at Deepdale.

=== Republic of Ireland ===
In 2019, it was reported that Keane was set to declare for the Republic of Ireland after he met with Ireland manager Mick McCarthy. In February 2019, in Ipswich match notes, he confirmed that he wanted to play for Ireland and that he hoped to be included in Ireland squads in the coming months, confirming that he had declared for Ireland.

On 30 September 2021, Republic of Ireland manager Stephen Kenny included Keane in his squad for the upcoming 2022 FIFA World Cup qualification match against Azerbaijan and the international friendly against Qatar, although Keane did not make the matchday squad for either game. He made his debut for Ireland in a World Cup qualifier against Portugal on 11 November 2021.

== Career statistics ==
As of match played 2 May 2026

=== Club ===
Appearances and goals by club, season and competition
Club	Season	Division	League		FA Cup		League Cup		Other		Total	
Club	Season	Division	Apps	Goals	Apps	Goals	Apps	Goals	Apps	Goals	Apps	Goals
Manchester United	2011–12	Premier League	1	0	0	0	0	0	0	0	1	0
Manchester United	2012–13	Premier League	0	0	0	0	0	0	0	0	0	0
Manchester United	2013–14	Premier League	0	0	0	0	0	0	0	0	0	0
Manchester United	2014–15	Premier League	0	0	0	0	0	0	0	0	0	0
Manchester United	2015–16	Premier League	1	0	1	0	0	0	0	0	2	0
Manchester United	Total		2	0	1	0	0	0	0	0	3	0
Wigan Athletic (loan)	2013–14	Championship	4	0	0	0	0	0	0	0	4	0
Queens Park Rangers (loan)	2013–14	Championship	10	0	0	0	0	0	0	0	10	0
Sheffield Wednesday (loan)	2014–15	Championship	13	3	0	0	0	0	—		13	3
Preston North End (loan)	2015–16	Championship	20	1	0	0	2	1	—		22	2
Hull City	2016–17	Premier League	5	0	0	0	1	0	—		6	0
Hull City	2017–18	Championship	9	1	1	0	0	0	—		10	1
Hull City	2018–19	Championship	8	0	0	0	2	0	—		10	0
Hull City	Total		22	1	1	0	3	0	0	0	26	1
Ipswich Town (loan)	2018–19	Championship	11	3	1	0	0	0	—		12	3
Ipswich Town	2019–20	League One	23	3	4	1	0	0	2 (Note: Appearance(s) in EFL Trophy)	2	29	6
Ipswich Town	Total		34	6	5	1	0	0	2	2	41	9
Wigan Athletic	2020–21	League One	32	10	1	0	0	0	1	1	34	11
Wigan Athletic	2021–22	League One	44	26	3	0	1	0	2	1	50	27
Wigan Athletic	2022–23	Championship	43	12	2	0	0	0	—		45	12
Wigan Athletic	Total		119	48	6	0	1	0	3	2	129	50
Preston North End	2023–24	Championship	38	13	1	0	1	0	0	0	40	13
Preston North End	2024–25	Championship	27	3	3	1	1	0	0	0	31	4
Preston North End	2025–26	Championship	2	1	0	0	0	0	—		2	1
Preston North End	Total		67	17	4	1	2	0	0	0	73	18
Reading (loan)	2025–26	League One	14	2	0	0	0	0	—		14	2
Reading (loan)	Total		14	2	0	0	0	0	—		14	2
Doncaster Rovers	2026–27	League One	0	0	0	0	0	0	0	0	0	0
Doncaster Rovers	Total		0	0	0	0	0	0	0	0	0	0
Career total			305	78	17	2	8	1	5	4	335	85

=== International ===
As of match played 7 September 2023

Appearances and goals by national team and year
National team	Year	Apps	Goals
Republic of Ireland	2021	1	0
Republic of Ireland	2022	3	0
Republic of Ireland	2023	1	0
Total		5	0

== Honours ==
Manchester United

- FA Youth Cup: 2010–11

Wigan Athletic

- EFL League One: 2021–22

England U17

- UEFA European Under-17 Championship: 2010

Individual

- Jimmy Murphy Young Player of the Year: 2009–10
- EFL League One Golden Boot: 2021–22
- PFA Team of the Year: 2021–22 League One
