= Todd Kane =

English footballer (born 1993)

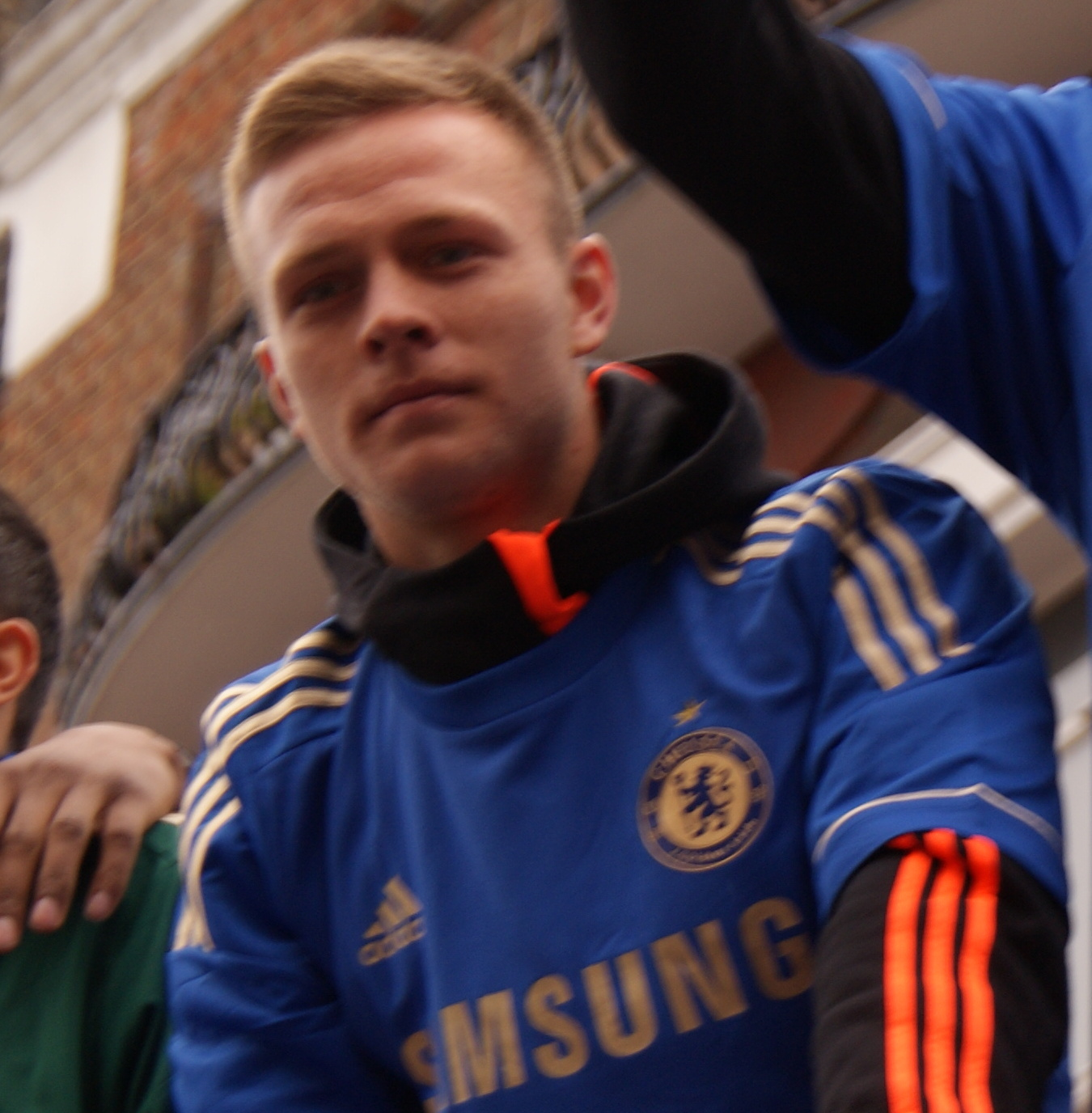
- Kane during Chelsea's victory parade following the 2012 UEFA Champions League final

Personal information
- Full name: Todd Arthur Lucien Kane
- Date of birth: 17 September 1993 (age 33)
- Place of birth: Huntingdon, England
- Height: 5 ft 11 in (1.80 m)
- Position: Right back

Team information
- Current team: Peterborough United (academy coach)

Youth career
- 2001–2012: Chelsea

Senior career*
Years	Team	Apps	(Gls)
2012–2019	Chelsea	0	(0)
2012–2013	→ Preston North End (loan)	3	(0)
2013–2014	→ Blackburn Rovers (loan)	41	(2)
2014–2015	→ Bristol City (loan)	5	(0)
2015	→ Nottingham Forest (loan)	8	(1)
2015–2016	→ NEC Nijmegen (loan)	31	(1)
2017–2018	→ Groningen (loan)	11	(0)
2018	→ Oxford United (loan)	17	(3)
2018–2019	→ Hull City (loan)	39	(3)
2019–2021	Queens Park Rangers	60	(3)
2021–2023	Coventry City	38	(1)
2023	→ Charlton Athletic (loan)	5	(0)
2023–2024	Manchester 62	6	(1)
2024	Stockport County	3	(0)
2024–2025	Ebbsfleet United	11	(0)

International career
2011–2012	England U19	8	(1)
- * Club domestic league appearances and goals as of 23:17, 11 September 2025 (UTC)

Todd Arthur Lucien Kane (born 17 September 1993) is an English former professional footballer who played primarily as a right back. Kane is currently an academy coach at EFL League One side Peterborough United.

== Club career ==
=== Chelsea ===
Kane joined Chelsea at under–8 level and progressed through the youth system at the club. He signed his first professional contract with the club in July 2011.

During the 2010–11 Premier Reserve League national play-off final, Kane scored the equaliser which meant Chelsea would later win 5–4 on penalties against Blackburn Rovers.

He was a part of the side that won the 2011–12 FA Youth Cup, beating Blackburn Rovers in the final. Kane ended the 2011–12 season by being a part of the first team squad who flew to Munich for the Champions League final where Chelsea beat Bayern Munich in a penalty shootout.

On 25 April 2013, Kane signed a new contract with Chelsea, keeping him at the club until 2016.

On 3 August 2015, Kane signed a new three-year deal at Chelsea, therefore keeping him at the club until 2018.

On 23 September 2016, Kane signed another new three-year, extending his stay until 2019.

Kane turned down a new contract and departed Stamford Bridge at the end of the 2018–19 season, after failing to win a call into a first team squad which concluded his 18 years at the club.

=== Loan spells ===
==== Preston North End ====
In November 2012, he joined Football League One side Preston North End on loan until January 2013. He made his professional debut on 24 November 2012, in a 2–0 defeat to Leyton Orient. He made a total of five appearances in all competitions during his time at Deepdale.

==== Blackburn Rovers ====
On 9 January 2013, he signed for Blackburn Rovers on a one-month loan deal as they needed a replacement for Adam Henley as he was sidelined with a hamstring injury. He made his debut for Rovers on 11 January in a 1–1 draw against Wolverhampton Wanderers. On 15 March 2013, Blackburn re-signed Kane on another month–long loan deal. Kane later extended his contract with Blackburn until the end of the 2012–13 season. On 25 June 2013, Kane rejoined Blackburn on loan for the entire 2013–14 Football League Championship season. He scored his first professional goal against Barnsley on 24 August 2013 in a 5–2 win. He scored his second goal for Blackburn in their 4–2 victory over Birmingham which turned out to be his last game for Blackburn.

==== Bristol City ====
On 14 November 2014, Bristol City signed Todd on a two-month loan until 18 January 2015. On 15 November 2014, Todd made his debut for Bristol City as a substitute for Scott Wagstaff in the 75th minute against Swindon Town, the game ended in a 1–0 loss for Bristol City. On 7 December Todd made his first start for Bristol City against Telford United in the second round proper of the FA Cup, where Todd played the full 90 minutes; the game ended in a 1–0 win for Bristol City. In the dying minutes, Todd suffered a shoulder injury from Godfrey Poku.

==== Nottingham Forest ====
After his loan spell at Bristol City expired, Kane was loaned to Championship club Nottingham Forest until the end of the 2014–15 season. Kane made his debut for Nottingham Forest on 10 January 2015 against Sheffield Wednesday, which ended in a 2–0 loss for Forest. After his debut, Kane made three consecutive start under the management of Stuart Pearce including a 2–1 away win against Derby County. After Dougie Freedman replaced Stuart Pearce, Kane's role in the squad was reduced greatly, only making the bench twice and ending up as an unused substitute for both games. On 7 March 2015, Kane returned to the starting line-up in the match against Middlesbrough; the match ended in a 2–1 win for Forest. On 6 April 2015, Kane came off the bench replacing fellow goal-scorer, Tyler Walker, in the 75th minute against Brentford. He scored from a cross Ben Osborn to the far post; though the two-goal lead was not enough for a win as Forest drew 2–2.

==== NEC Nijmegen ====
On 6 August 2015, Kane joined NEC Nijmegen on a season-long loan to gain first team experience abroad. On 12 August, Kane made his debut coming off the bench in a match against Excelsior which ended in a 1–0 win for NEC Nijmegen. On 23 August, Kane made his first start in a 2–0 loss against Ajax. During his time at the club, Kane and former Liverpool goalkeeper Brad Jones were asked to be captain. After a talk with manager Ernest Faber, Jones was made captain and Kane was made vice-captain. Kane scored his first and only goal of the season in a 3–1 loss against FC Utrecht on 10 April 2016. Kane's season was cut short when he suffered an injury during the game against PEC Zwolle on 20 April 2016. Kane was stretchered off the pitch in the closing stages of the game. After an MRI scan, it was confirmed that Kane had torn his anterior cruciate ligament, ruling him out for 4–6 months.

==== FC Groningen ====
On 5 July 2017, following his recovery from a knee injury, Kane returned to the Netherlands to be reunited with manager Ernest Faber and join FC Groningen on a season-long loan. On the opening day of the season, he made his debut during Groningen's 3–3 draw with Heerenveen, replacing Mike te Wierik in the 83rd minute. Two weeks later, Kane made his first start for Groningen during their 2–1 home victory over Utrecht. On 30 January 2018, after only appearing in 12 games all season, Kane's loan spell with Groningen was terminated.

==== Oxford United ====
On 31 January 2018, Kane joined Oxford United on loan for the remainder of the season. On 3 February 2018, Kane made his debut in a 3–2 win over Charlton Athletic where Kane also scored the equaliser to make it 2–2 in the 89th minute. On 28 April 2018, Kane scored the winning penalty to ensure Oxford United's place in League One the following season with a 2–1 win over Rochdale.

==== Hull City ====
On 17 July 2018, Kane joined Hull City on a season-long loan. He made his debut in the first match of the season on 6 August 2018 at home to Aston Villa in a 1–3 defeat. On 1 September 2018, Kane scored his first goal for Hull City in a 2–1 defeat to Derby County. On the penultimate game of the season, Kane scored a brace against West Brom in a 3–2 defeat on the 19 April 2019.

=== Queens Park Rangers ===
After turning down a new contract with Chelsea, Kane signed with West London rivals Queens Park Rangers on 27 July 2019, joining on a three-year deal on the same day Marc Pugh signed with the club. Kane made his full league debut for QPR in 1–1 draw against Huddersfield Town on the 10 August 2019. On 18 July 2020, Kane scored his first goal for QPR in a 4–3 win over London rivals Millwall. On 20 February 2021, Kane scored the winner which mean QPR beat Bournemouth 2–1 helping them win 6 out of 7 games.

In May 2021, Kane received a seven-game ban for using abusive language towards Brentford's Sergi Canós that referenced 'nationality or ethnicity' following the Championship game in February. He has also been fined £6,000 and must attend an education session.

=== Coventry City ===
On 31 August 2021, Kane joined fellow Championship side Coventry City on a two-year deal for an undisclosed fee.

Kane scored his first goal for the 'Sky Blues' on 27 November 2021 with a last minute equaliser against Bournemouth.

==== Charlton Athletic (loan) ====
On 12 January 2023, Kane joined League One side Charlton Athletic on loan until the end of the 2022–23 season.

=== Manchester 62 ===
In October 2023, Kane signed for Gibraltar Football League club Manchester 62.

=== Stockport County ===
On 12 March 2024, it was announced that Kane had signed a contract with EFL League Two side Stockport County until the end of the 2023-24 season.

=== Ebbsfleet United ===
On 30 September 2024, Kane signed for National League club Ebbsfleet United.

== International career ==
Born in England, Kane is also eligible to represent Scotland through his father. Kane was first called up by England to represent the U19s at a friendly tournament in Limoges during October 2011. On 8 August 2013, he was called up to England U21 squad for the first time for a friendly match against Scotland.

== Career statistics ==
As of match played on 29 April 2023

Club statistics
Club	Season	League			Cup		League Cup		Other		Total	
Club	Season	Division	Apps	Goals	Apps	Goals	Apps	Goals	Apps	Goals	Apps	Goals
Chelsea	2012–13	Premier League	0	0	0	0	0	0	0	0	0	0
Chelsea	2013–14	Premier League	0	0	0	0	0	0	0	0	0	0
Chelsea	2014–15	Premier League	0	0	0	0	0	0	0	0	0	0
Chelsea	2015–16	Premier League	0	0	0	0	0	0	0	0	0	0
Chelsea	2016–17	Premier League	0	0	0	0	0	0	0	0	0	0
Chelsea	2017–18	Premier League	0	0	0	0	0	0	0	0	0	0
Chelsea	2018–19	Premier League	0	0	0	0	0	0	0	0	0	0
Chelsea	Total		0	0	0	0	0	0	0	0	0	0
Preston North End (loan)	2012–13	League One	3	0	2	0	0	0	0	0	5	0
Blackburn Rovers (loan)	2013–14	Championship	41	2	0	0	0	0	0	0	41	2
Bristol City (loan)	2014–15	League One	5	0	2	0	0	0	0	0	7	0
Nottingham Forest (loan)	2014–15	Championship	8	1	0	0	0	0	0	0	8	1
NEC Nijmegen (loan)	2015–16	Eredivisie	31	1	3	0	0	0	0	0	34	1
Groningen (loan)	2017–18	Eredivisie	11	0	1	0	0	0	0	0	12	0
Oxford United (loan)	2017–18	League One	17	3	0	0	0	0	0	0	17	3
Hull City (loan)	2018–19	Championship	39	3	1	0	1	0	0	0	41	3
Queens Park Rangers	2019–20	Championship	32	1	2	0	2	0	0	0	36	1
Queens Park Rangers	2020–21	Championship	28	2	1	0	0	0	0	0	29	2
Queens Park Rangers	Total		60	3	3	0	2	0	0	0	65	3
Coventry City	2021–22	Championship	29	1	2	0	0	0	0	0	31	1
Coventry City	2022–23	Championship	9	0	1	0	0	0	0	0	10	0
Coventry City	Total		38	1	3	0	0	0	0	0	41	1
Charlton Athletic (loan)	2022–23	League One	5	0	0	0	0	0	0	0	5	0
Career totals			258	14	15	0	3	0	0	0	276	14

== Honours ==
Chelsea Reserves

- Premier Reserve League: 2010–11
- FA Youth Cup: 2011–12

Stockport County

- EFL League Two: 2023–24
