= Alex Brister =

English footballer

Personal information
- Full name: Alexander Keith Brister
- Date of birth: 19 December 1993 (age 32)
- Place of birth: Epsom, England
- Position: Right-back

Youth career
- 2002–2014: Fulham

Senior career*
Years	Team	Apps	(Gls)
2014	Fulham	0	(0)
2014	→ FC Honka (loan)	11	(2)
2015	Notodden	9	(1)
2015	Notodden B	5	(2)
- * Club domestic league appearances and goals as of 17:00, 29 Jan 2016 (UTC)

Alexander Keith Brister (born 19 December 1993) is an English footballer who plays as a defender.

== Club career ==
On 6 April 2014, Brister joined FC Honka on loan after training with the club earlier in the week. Prior to his loan move, he made ten appearances for the Fulham Under-21 team in the 2013–14 season.

Brister made his Veikkausliiga debut on the opening day of the 2014 season, playing the entirety of a 4–3 away loss to MYPA. Brister scores his first goal for the club, in his next appearance despite losing 2–1 against MYPA.

Brister was one of several players to be released by Fulham at the end of the 2013–14 season.

He spent the 2015 season with Norwegian side Notodden, appearing for the first team and the second team in the third-tier and fifth-tiers respectively.
