= Craig Lynch (English footballer) =

English footballer

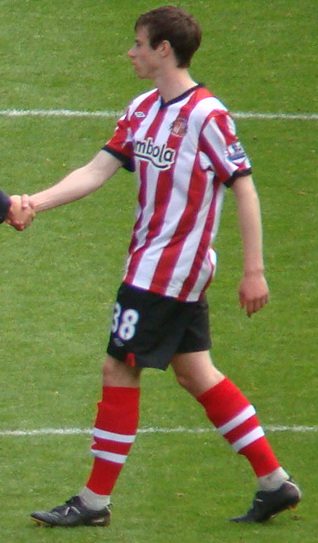
- Lynch playing for Sunderland

Personal information
- Full name: Craig Thomas Lynch
- Date of birth: 25 March 1992 (age 34)
- Place of birth: Chester-le-Street, England
- Height: 1.75 m (5 ft 9 in)
- Positions: Striker; midfielder

Team information
- Current team: Morpeth Town (manager)

Youth career
- 1997–1999: Riverside R.A.R.
- 1999–2010: Sunderland

Senior career*
Years	Team	Apps	(Gls)
2010–2014	Sunderland	2	(0)
2012	→ Hartlepool United (loan)	6	(1)
2014	Rochdale	1	(0)
2014–2015	Spennymoor Town	4	(0)
2015	Blyth Spartans		
2015–2018	Seaham Red Star		

Managerial career
- 2018: Seaham Red Star
- 2021–: Morpeth Town
- * Club domestic league appearances and goals as of 17:26, 8 May 2014 (UTC)

Craig Thomas Lynch (born 25 March 1992) is an English former professional footballer who played as a striker. He is the manager of Morpeth Town.

== Playing career ==
=== Sunderland ===
Born in Chester-le-Street, County Durham, Lynch turned professional in 2010 after two seasons in Sunderland's academy. In 2008, Lynch signed his first professional contract with the club.

He was called up into the first team in April 2011, and made his professional debut on 30 April, coming on as a substitute in their 3–0 home loss to Fulham in the Premier League. Two months later in July, Lynch signed a two-year contract with the club.

Under the management of Martin O'Neill, it was announced that Lynch would go out on loan to gain first‑team experience. On 8 September 2012, he joined Football League One side Hartlepool United on a one-month loan deal. Lynch scored his first goal for the club, in a 3–1 loss against Colchester United on 27 September 2012. Despite losing 3–1, Manager Neale Cooper praised Lynch performance, as well as, his goal. After making six appearances and scoring once, Lynch returned to his parent club after spending one month at Hartlepool United.

=== Rochdale ===
On 18 February 2014, Lynch joined Rochdale following his release from Sunderland.

On 3 May 2014, Lynch made his only appearance for Rochdale, coming on as substitute on the 56th minute of the final game of the season, a 2–1 defeat away at Newport County. Lynch was among released at the end of the season.

=== Non-League ===
After being released by Rochdale, Lynch moved to Spennymoor Town of the Northern Premier League Division One North on 8 August 2014.

On 5 February 2015, Blyth Spartans announced the signing of Lynch. In November 2015 he joined Seaham Red Star.

== Managerial career ==
In February 2018, Lynch was appointed manager of Seaham Red Star.

In June 2018, Lynch joined Morpeth Town as assistant manager. In September 2021, he was appointed caretaker manager of Morpeth Town and he was given the job on a permanent basis the following month.

During his first season in charge, Lynch guided Morpeth Town to their best ever run in the FA Trophy and equal best run in the FA Cup, on both occasions losing to then National League North team York City. He also guided the club to safety after a poor start to the season under Stephen Turnbull, including a run of 1 league defeat in 18 games following his appointment.

== Career statistics ==
As of 4 June 2014.

Club	Season	League		FA Cup		League Cup		Other		Total	
Club	Season	Apps	Goals	Apps	Goals	Apps	Goals	Apps	Goals	Apps	Goals
Sunderland	2010–11	2	0	0	0	0	0	0	0	2	0
Sunderland total		2	0	0	0	0	0	0	0	2	0
Hartlepool (loan)	2012–13	6	1	0	0	0	0	0	0	6	1
Rochdale	2013–14	1	0	0	0	0	0	0	0	1	0
Spennymoor	2014–15	4	0	0	0	0	0	0	0	4	0
Blyth Spartans	2015–	0	0	0	0	0	0	0	0	0	0
Career total		13	1	0	0	0	0	0	0	13	1

== Managerial statistics ==
Team	Nation	From	To	Record							
Team	Nation	From	To	G	W	D	L	F	A	GD	Win %
Morpeth Town	England	12 September 2021	Present	202	77	49	76	319	314	+5	38.12
Total				202	77	49	76	319	314	+5	38.12

As of 31 October 2025
