= 2016–17 Brentford F.C. season =

English football team season

Brentford
2016–17 season
- Owner: Matthew Benham
- Chairman: Cliff Crown
- Head Coach: Dean Smith
- Stadium: Griffin Park
- Championship: 10th
- FA Cup: Fourth round (vs. Chelsea)
- League Cup: First round (vs. Exeter City)
- Top goalscorer: League: Lasse Vibe (15 goals); All: Lasse Vibe (16 goals)
- Highest home attendance: 12,052 (vs Fulham, 4 November 2016)
- Lowest home attendance: 7,537 (vs Eastleigh, 7 January 2017)
- Average home league attendance: 10,467
Home colours	Away colours

The 2016–17 season was Brentford's 127th year in existence and third consecutive season in the Championship. The club also participated in the FA Cup and League Cup. The season covers the period from 1 July 2016 to 30 June 2017.

== Season review ==
=== July ===
Brentford began the 2016–17 season with various transfers. Captain Jake Bidwell joined arch-rivals Queens Park Rangers for an undisclosed fee on 1 July. However, on the same day, Brentford also brought in three new players: Dan Bentley, John Egan, and Romaine Sawyers after their contracts at their respective clubs expired. On 8 July, defender Jack O'Connell joined Sheffield United for an undisclosed fee. Later that day, Brentford kicked off their first pre-season friendly against Boreham Wood. A late Lewis Macleod header could not prevent defeat for the Bees as they lost 2–1. On 9 July, Brentford travelled to Germany for a 7-day pre-season training camp. During their time there, Brentford played VfL Bochum and won 1–0 thanks to a first half Scott Hogan goal. On 19 July, goalkeeper David Button joined local rivals Fulham for an undisclosed fee. Brentford continued their pre-season with a trip to Wycombe Wanderers. New signing Egan scored his first goal for the club before the break but Dayle Southwell equalised with a header in the second half, leaving the final score as 1–1. The first home game of the season was against 1. FC Kaiserslautern on 23 July. On a very hot day, Brentford took the lead after Alexander Ring inadvertently headed the ball into his own net in the second half. However, minutes later, Brentford conceded an equaliser from Róbert Pich to make the score 1–1. Just three days later, Brentford welcomed Peterborough United to Griffin Park. Paul Taylor scored for the Posh early on after a Tom Field mistake, but despite dominating the rest of the game, Brentford could not beat the opposition goalkeeper. On 30 July, Brentford announced the season-long loan of Callum Elder from Leicester City as a replacement for Bidwell at left back. Elder made his first appearance for the club in a testimonial match against Millwall to honour former captain Tony Craig. The match finished 1–1 after Yoann Barbet's early free kick was cancelled out by Steve Morison's header. Brentford's pre-season concluded with only one win from six matches.

=== August ===
Forward Lasse Vibe was called up for Denmark in the 2016 Summer Olympics and so would miss Brentford's first few games of the season. Brentford began their Championship campaign away to Huddersfield Town where they finished their previous season. Elias Kachunga put the hosts in front in the first half with Nico Yennaris equalising after coming off the bench in the second half. However, substitute Kasey Palmer scored the winner after a good Bentley save. On 8 August, midfielder Akaki Gogia joined Dynamo Dresden on a season long loan. The following day, Brentford announced the signing of Emmanuel Ledesma, who had been training with The Bees during pre-season, on a non-contract basis. He was available for the EFL Cup First round tie against League Two side Exeter City. In a disappointing display, Brentford suffered a 1–0 defeat after extra time thanks to a good Ryan Harley finish from inside the penalty box. Brentford made amends with a convincing 2–0 victory against Ipswich Town with Egan scoring both goals on his home competitive debut and also Sam Saunders' 200th competitive game for the club. Brentford's second home league game of the season finished 1–0 against Nottingham Forest. Hogan scored his first goal of the season after Stephen Henderson saved his and Macleod's earlier efforts. Despite going a man down, Forest finished the game on top, with Bentley keeping out a last minute one-on-one effort from Britt Assombalonga to secure all three points. Vibe returned to Brentford's lineup in their next game against Rotherham United. While Brentford had played some promising football, they could not unlock the opposition defence and succumbed to a 1–0 defeat after conceding a dubious Danny Ward goal which had appeared offside. A week later, Brentford hosted Sheffield Wednesday at Griffin Park. Wednesday dominated the first half and was unlucky to not be ahead by half-time. It would be Brentford that broke the deadlock first in the second half after a clearance by goalkeeper Keiren Westwood cannoned off the onrushing Vibe and bounced into the net. Both teams went down to 10 men after David Jones received a second yellow card for dissent while the goalscorer Vibe also received a second yellow card. In the dying minutes, and with Brentford camped outside their box, Wednesday equalised as Sam Hutchinson headed in a Barry Bannan free kick.

It was a busy transfer deadline day for Brentford with one departure and two new arrivals. Ledesma left the club to join Greek side Panetolikos after being informed that he would not be offered a contract. Left back Rico Henry joined from Dean Smith's previous club Walsall on a five-year contract for an initial fee of £1.5 million that could rise to over £5 million in add-ons. Winger Sullay Kaikai joined on loan from Crystal Palace until the end of the season. Also on transfer deadline day, midfielder Ryan Woods signed a new four-year contract to extend his stay until 2020.

=== September ===
After the international break, Brentford travelled down to the south coast to play Brighton & Hove Albion. In a hard-fought match, Hogan scored his first goal after racing away from the Brighton back line to slot home in the first half. Brentford's defence had to work hard to shut out the Seagulls with Egan having to clear a header off the line. Hogan's left foot finish high into the net from an angle made sure the Bees took home the three points. On 14 September, Brentford travelled to Villa Park to face Aston Villa for the first time in over 60 years. Villa appeared to be coasting to a win after new signing Jonathan Kodjia fired in a stunning curler in the first half but Brentford dug deep and, in the 88th minute, Egan fired in the equaliser with the help of two deflections to give Brentford a share of the points. Brentford then returned to Griffin Park to face Preston North End. It was a tight match in the first half with Hogan's left foot finish after Sawyers' through ball the only goal separating the two sides at the break. However, Preston collapsed after Dean fired in from a corner. The Lilywhites had to finish the game with 10 men when Marnick Vermijl was forced off due to injury with all their substitutions having already been made. Preston conceded 3 goals in almost as many minutes with Hogan completing his hat-trick and Chris Humphrey scoring an own goal. The match ended 5–0 to the Bees. Brentford's next match was against Wolverhampton Wanderers which finished 3–1 against the Bees. João Teixeira scored a brace with the first one coming after Josh McEachran was dispossessed in the Wolves half and the second one a free kick that found its way into the net after a dubious decision by the referee to penalise Woods. Kaikai's first goal for the club was not enough to rescue a point for the visitors as Ivan Cavaleiro slotted under Bentley late on. Brentford's impressive home form continued with a 4–1 drubbing of Reading. Josh Clarke scored his first goal for the Bees after a lovely passing move with Vibe adding to the scoreline just before half-time. After the break, Maxime Colin also netted his first goal for the club with a high finish from an angle. Yann Kermorgant gave Reading some hope with a converted penalty after Yennaris tripped Stephen Quinn but it was not to be for the R's as Hogan netted his 7th goal of the season after McEachran's cute pass on the edge of the box.

Hogan won the Championship Player of the Month award for September after scoring 6 goals in 5 matches.

=== October ===
Brentford extended their home unbeaten run to 10 games with a goalless draw against Wigan Athletic. After the international break, Brentford made the journey north-east to face promotion favourites Newcastle United. Ciaran Clark nodded in the opener with Dwight Gayle also scoring within the first quarter of an hour as well as early in the second half. While Hogan netted his 8th goal of the season, it only proved to be a consolation to a much better side. Brentford's next match came against Derby County where a solid defensive display meant the game finished 0–0. On 20 October, midfielder Alan McCormack was charged for "using abusive and/or insulting words towards a match official" which "included a reference to gender" during a Cardiff City match in April. McCormack was suspended for five matches and fined £6,000 as well as being ordered to attend a training course. Brentford celebrated their 4000th English Football League match at Griffin Park against Barnsley but failed to win against the South Yorkshire club. Adam Armstrong's placed finish after Barbet's attempted clearance following a free kick gave Barnsley the lead in the first half. Sam Winnall tapped home after Ryan Kent's shot rebounded off the inside of the post to secure the win. Brentford travelled to Loftus Road to face Queens Park Rangers in the first West London derby of the season. Clarke wriggled around the defenders in the box from McEachran's pass and slotted the ball under goalkeeper Alex Smithies just before half-time to give the Bees the lead. Brentford doubled their lead after Colin found Sawyers free on the edge of the box. With a wonderful first time, left foot finish, Sawyers grabbed the winner in what was a well deserved 2–0 victory. Shortly after the goal, Macleod was stretchered off with a knee injury. It was later found that it was a significant injury which would require surgery and that Macleod would be out of action for the rest of the season.

=== November ===
Brentford hosted Fulham for another West London derby, a week after defeating Queens Park Rangers. The Bees could not find the form they showed against Q.P.R. as they suffered a 2–0 defeat. Sone Aluko tapped in the opening goal in the first half after his initial shot was saved by Bentley. Button, who had left Brentford for Fulham in the summer, was rarely tested in goal. As Brentford were pushing for an equaliser, Tom Cairney scored Fulham's second goal on the break late into stoppage time to seal defeat for the Bees. After the international break, Brentford travelled to Ewood Park to face Blackburn Rovers. It was a frantic match with Hogan scoring within the first minute before Danny Graham scored twice in quick succession to bring the match into Blackburn's favour. Hogan scored his second soon after to level the score but a deflection from Dean into his own net proved to be the winner as Blackburn won 3–2. Brentford's dismal November continued back at Griffin Park against Birmingham City. Despite dominating the game, Brentford fell to a 2–1 defeat after a penalty from former Bee Clayton Donaldson and a goal from Ryan Shotton midway through the second half. Blues' keeper Tomasz Kuszczak had a fine game with a string of good saves while Vibe had a shot blocked on the line. Hogan's header was merely a consolation goal as Brentford finished November with no points from 3 games.

==== New crest ====
On 10 November, Brentford announced their new crest that would be used from the start of the 2017/18 season. Featuring a circular crest and a more modern, clean look, the design was loosely based on the crest used from 1972 to 1975.

== Transfers & loans ==
=== Transfers in ===
Players transferred in
Date	Pos.	Name	Previous club	Fee	Ref.
1 July 2016	GK	(England) Dan Bentley	(England) Southend United	Compensation	
1 July 2016	DF	(England) Jarvis Edobor	(England) Chalfont St Peter	n/a	
1 July 2016	DF	(Republic of Ireland) John Egan	(England) Gillingham	Compensation	
1 July 2016	GK	(Australia) Dominic Kurasik	(England) Stoke City	Free	
1 July 2016	GK	(England) Dimi Kyriatzis	(England) Henley Town	Free	
1 July 2016	MF	(Saint Kitts and Nevis) Romaine Sawyers	(England) Walsall	Free	
1 July 2016	DF	(Denmark) Lukas Talbro	(Denmark) Odense	n/a	
14 July 2016	FW	(Spain) Marc Río	(Spain) FC Barcelona	Free	
18 July 2016	FW	(Denmark) Justin Shaibu	(Denmark) Køge	Undisclosed	
6 August 2016	DF	(Greece) Ilias Chatzitheodoridis	(England) Arsenal	Free	
9 August 2016	MF	(Argentina) Emmanuel Ledesma	(England) Rotherham United	Non-contract	
31 August 2016	DF	(Jamaica) Rico Henry	(England) Walsall	£1,500,000	
1 September 2016	MF	(Germany) Raphael Assibey-Mensah	(Germany) 1. FSV Mainz 05	Free	
10 January 2017	FW	(Sweden) Henrik Johansson	(Sweden) Halmstad	Undisclosed	
27 January 2017	MF	(Suriname) Florian Jozefzoon	(Netherlands) PSV Eindhoven	Undisclosed	
31 January 2017	FW	(Slovenia) Jan Novak	(Slovenia) NK Krka	Undisclosed	
31 January 2017	MF	(Spain) Sergi Canós	(England) Norwich City	Undisclosed	
14 March 2017	FW	(England) Joe Hardy	(England) Manchester City	Undisclosed	

=== Loans in ===
Players loaned in
Date from	Pos.	Name	Parent Club	End date	Ref.
30 July 2016	DF	(Australia) Callum Elder	(England) Leicester City	31 January 2017	
31 August 2016	MF	(Sierra Leone) Sullay Kaikai	(England) Crystal Palace	2 January 2017	

=== Transfers out ===
Players transferred out
Date	Pos.	Name	Subsequent club	Fee	Ref.
1 July 2016	DF	(England) Jake Bidwell	(England) Queens Park Rangers	Undisclosed	
8 July 2016	DF	(England) Jack O'Connell	(England) Sheffield United	Undisclosed	
19 July 2016	GK	(England) David Button	(England) Fulham	Undisclosed	
20 January 2017	MF	(England) Sam Saunders	(England) Wycombe Wanderers	Free	
31 January 2017	FW	(Republic of Ireland) Scott Hogan	(England) Aston Villa	Undisclosed	

=== Loans out ===
Players loaned out
Date from	Pos.	Name	Subsequent club	End date	Ref.
8 August 2016	MF	(Germany) Akaki Gogia	(Germany) Dynamo Dresden	End of season	
1 January 2017	DF	(England) Manny Onariase	(England) Cheltenham Town	End of season	
20 January 2017	MF	(Germany) Jan Holldack	(Germany) Wuppertaler SV	End of season	

=== Players released ===
Players released
Date	Pos.	Name	Subsequent club	Join date	Ref.
31 August 2016	MF	(Argentina) Emmanuel Ledesma	(Greece) Panetolikos	31 August 2016	
25 February 2017	DF	(England) Nathan Fox	(England) Cray Wanderers	25 February 2017	
30 June 2017	FW	(England) Luke Dunn	(England) Walton & Hersham	n/a	
30 June 2017	MF	(England) James Ferry	(England) Stevenage	1 July 2017	
30 June 2017	FW	(England) Seika Jatta	Free agent		
30 June 2017	GK	(Australia) Dominic Kurasik	(England) Colchester United	31 July 2017	
30 June 2017	GK	(England) Dimi Kyriatzis	(England) Hayes & Yeading United	14 October 2017	
30 June 2017	MF	(England) Kyjuon Marsh-Brown	(England) Bedford Town	1 September 2017	
30 June 2017	DF	(Republic of Ireland) Alan McCormack	(England) Luton Town	1 July 2017	
30 June 2017	FW	(England) Danny Parish	(England) Concord Rangers	September 2017	
30 June 2017	FW	(Spain) Marc Río	(Spain) UA Horta	July 2017	

== Pre-season and friendlies ==
8 July 2016 Friendly	Boreham Wood	2–1	Brentford	Borehamwood
19:30 BST	Andrade 17'; Clifford 60'	Report	Macleod 87'	Stadium: Meadow Park

13 July 2016 Friendly	VfL Bochum	0–1	Brentford	Bochum, Germany
19:00 CEST		Report	Hogan 36'	Stadium: Ruhrstadion

19 July 2016 Friendly	Wycombe Wanderers	1–1	Brentford	High Wycombe
19:45 BST	Southwell 77'	Report	Egan 39'	Stadium: Adams Park; Attendance: 1,338

23 July 2016 Friendly	Brentford	1–1	1. FC Kaiserslautern	Brentford, London
15:00 BST	Ring 47' (o.g.)	Report	Pich 53'	Stadium: Griffin Park; Referee: Gavin Ward

26 July 2016 Friendly	Brentford	0–1	Peterborough United	Brentford, London
19:45 BST		Report	P. Taylor 3'	Stadium: Griffin Park; Referee: Gavin Ward

30 July 2016 Testimonial	Millwall	1–1	Brentford	Bermondsey, London
15:00 BST	Morison 28'	Report	Barbet 6'	Stadium: The Den; Attendance: 1,951

20 September 2016 Friendly	Leyton Orient XI	0–2	Brentford XI	Leyton, London
		Report	Hofmann; McCormack (pen.)	Stadium: Brisbane Road

== Championship ==
=== League results summary ===
Overall								Home						Away					
Pld	W	D	L	GF	GA	GD	Pts	W	D	L	GF	GA	GD	W	D	L	GF	GA	GD
46	18	10	18	75	65	+10	64	11	5	7	42	25	+17	7	5	11	33	40	−7

Last updated: 7 May 2017.
Source: Brentford F.C.

=== Results and position by round ===
Round	1	2	3	4	5	6	7	8	9	10	11	12	13	14	15	16	17	18	19	20	21	22	23	24	25	26	27	28	29	30	31	32	33	34	35	36	37	38	39	40	41	42	43	44	45	46
Ground	A	H	H	A	H	A	A	H	A	H	H	A	A	H	A	H	A	H	A	H	A	A	H	H	A	H	A	H	H	A	A	A	H	A	A	H	H	A	H	H	A	H	A	H	A	H
Result	L	W	W	L	D	W	D	W	L	W	D	L	D	L	W	L	L	L	L	W	W	L	D	D	W	L	L	W	D	L	L	W	W	D	W	L	L	W	W	W	L	W	D	W	D	L
Position	17	12	6	8	14	8	8	6	9	5	7	9	8	11	11	12	14	16	18	15	14	14	14	15	14	15	15	13	13	15	15	14	13	14	12	14	14	14	12	12	12	11	11	9	10	10

Updated to match(es) played on 7 May 2017. Source: Brentford F.C.
A = Away; H = Home; W = Win; D = Draw; L = Loss

=== League table ===
Pos	Team	Pld	W	D	L	GF	GA	GD	Pts
8	Norwich City	46	20	10	16	85	69	+16	70
9	Derby County	46	18	13	15	54	50	+4	67
10	Brentford	46	18	10	18	75	65	+10	64
11	Preston North End	46	16	14	16	64	63	+1	62
12	Cardiff City	46	17	11	18	60	61	−1	62

Source: English Football League, Soccerway
Rules for classification: 1) Points; 2) Goal difference; 3) Number of goals scored; 4) Points in head-to-head matches; 5) Goal difference in head-to-head matches; 6) Goals scored in head-to-head matches; 7) Play-off.

=== Matches ===
On 22 June 2016, the fixtures for the forthcoming season were announced.

6 August 2016 1	Huddersfield Town	2–1	Brentford	Huddersfield
15:00 BST	Kachunga 50'; Hudson (yellow card) 71'; Palmer 79'	Report	McEachran (yellow card) 37'; Yennaris 77'	Stadium: Kirklees Stadium; Attendance: 18,479; Referee: Geoff Eltringham

13 August 2016 2	Brentford	2–0	Ipswich Town	Brentford, London
15:00 BST	Egan 48', 56'	Report	Webster (yellow card) 38'	Stadium: Griffin Park; Attendance: 10,089; Referee: Steve Martin

16 August 2016 3	Brentford	1–0	Nottingham Forest	Brentford, London
19:45 BST	Hogan 29'; Colin (yellow card) 60'; Egan (yellow card) 68'; Woods (yellow card) 71'	Report	Mills (yellow card) 40'; Perquis (yellow card) 61' (yellow-red card) 88'; Pereira (yellow card) 84'	Stadium: Griffin Park; Attendance: 10,004; Referee: Tim Robinson

20 August 2016 4	Rotherham United	1–0	Brentford	Rotherham
15:00 BST	Ward 32'; Smallwood (yellow card) 70'	Report	Colin (yellow card) 75'	Stadium: New York Stadium; Attendance: 8,367; Referee: James Adcock

27 August 2016 5	Brentford	1–1	Sheffield Wednesday	Brentford, London
15:00 BST	Vibe 54' (yellow card) 41' (yellow-red card) 88'; Sawyers (yellow card) 52'; Dean (yellow card) 90+5'	Report	Jones (yellow card) 61' (yellow-red card) 73'; Hutchinson 90+3'	Stadium: Griffin Park; Attendance: 9,677; Referee: Peter Bankes

10 September 2016 6	Brighton & Hove Albion	0–2	Brentford	Brighton
15:00 BST	Knockaert (yellow card) 32'; Hemed (yellow card) 45+2'; Bong (yellow card) 60'; Manu (yellow card) 63'; Stephens (yellow card) 75'	Report	Woods (yellow card) 26'; Hogan 29', 70'; Egan (yellow card) 43'	Stadium: Falmer Stadium; Attendance: 26,388; Referee: Scott Duncan

14 September 2016 7	Aston Villa	1–1	Brentford	Birmingham
19:45 BST	Kodjia 19'; Bacuna (yellow card) 86'; Jedinak (yellow card) 90+4'	Report	Colin (yellow card) 41'; Woods (yellow card) 70'; Egan 88'	Stadium: Villa Park; Attendance: 29,752; Referee: Jeremy Simpson

17 September 2016 8	Brentford	5–0	Preston North End	Brentford, London
15:00 BST	Hogan 34', 84', 87'; Dean 74'; Humphrey 85' (o.g.)	Report	Cunningham (yellow card) 64'; Humphrey (yellow card) 81'	Stadium: Griffin Park; Attendance: 9,920; Referee: Keith Stroud

24 September 2016 9	Wolverhampton Wanderers	3–1	Brentford	Wolverhampton
15:00 BST	João Teixeira 47', 57'; Saïss (yellow card) 74'; Ivan Cavaleiro (yellow card) 90+3'	Report	Colin (yellow card) 35'; Sawyers (yellow card) 37'; Kaikai 67'; Dean (yellow card) 76'; Woods (yellow card) 90+4'	Stadium: Molineux Stadium; Attendance: 20,637; Referee: Andy Davies

27 September 2016 10	Brentford	4–1	Reading	Brentford, London
19:45 BST	Dean (yellow card) 5'; McCormack (yellow card) 19'; Clarke 41'; Vibe 44'; Colin 58'; Bjelland (yellow card) 69'; Yennaris (yellow card) 81'; Hogan 86'	Report	van den Berg (yellow card) 16'; Swift (yellow card) 19'; Kermorgant 64' (pen.)	Stadium: Griffin Park; Attendance: 9,679; Referee: Oliver Langford

1 October 2016 11	Brentford	0–0	Wigan Athletic	Brentford, London
15:00 BST	McCormack (yellow card) 36'; Dean (yellow card) 85'; Egan (yellow card) 90+4'	Report	Buxton (yellow card) 40'; Warnock (yellow card) 74'; Powell (yellow card) 90+3'	Stadium: Griffin Park; Attendance: 9,547; Referee: Andy Woolmer

15 October 2016 12	Newcastle United	3–1	Brentford	Newcastle
15:00 BST	Clark 11'; Gayle 16', 49'; Gouffran (yellow card) 26'; Colback (yellow card) 38'; Atsu (yellow card) 42'	Report	Dean (yellow card) 24'; Hogan 52'; Sawyers (yellow card) 72'; Woods (yellow card) 73'	Stadium: St James' Park; Attendance: 51,885; Referee: Simon Hooper

18 October 2016 13	Derby County	0–0	Brentford	Derby
19:45 BST	Bryson (yellow card) 67'	Report	Hogan (yellow card) 60'	Stadium: Priide Park; Attendance: 26,707; Referee: Scott Duncan

22 October 2016 14	Brentford	0–2	Barnsley	Brentford, London
15:00 BST	Hogan (yellow card) 45+2'; McEachran (yellow card) 66'	Report	Armstrong 29'; Winnall (yellow card) 45+1' (goal) 67'; MacDonald (yellow card) 45+2'; Hourihane (yellow card) 81'	Stadium: Griffin Park; Attendance: 10,417; Referee: James Lilington

28 October 2016 15	Queens Park Rangers	0–2	Brentford	Shepherd's Bush, London
19:45 BST	Borysiuk (yellow card) 18'; Chery (yellow card) 74'	Report	Dean (yellow card) 6'; Clarke 42'; Sawyers 74'	Stadium: Loftus Road Stadium; Attendance: 16,888; Referee: James Adcock

4 November 2016 16	Brentford	0–2	Fulham	Brentford
19:45 GMT	Dean (yellow card) 83'; Bjelland (yellow card) 89'; Vibe (yellow card) 90+5'	Report	McDonald (yellow card) 27'; Aluko 36'; Cairney 90+2'	Stadium: Griffin Park; Attendance: 12,052; Referee: Tim Robinson

19 November 2016 17	Blackburn Rovers	3–2	Brentford	Blackburn
15:00 GMT	Graham 15', 20' (pen.); Conway (yellow card) 27'; Dean 38' (o.g.); Lowe (yellow card) 59'; Marshall (yellow card) 66'	Report	Hogan 1', 30'; Bjelland (yellow card) 18'; Yennaris (yellow card) 66'	Stadium: Ewood Park; Attendance: 10,506; Referee: Chris Kavanagh

26 November 2016 18	Brentford	1–2	Birmingham City	Brentford
15:00 GMT	Bentley (yellow card) 13'; Egan (yellow card) 20'; Hogan 77'	Report	Donaldson 13' (pen.); Cotterill (yellow card) 48'; Shotton 63'; Davis (yellow card) 80'	Stadium: Griffin Park; Attendance: 10,925; Referee: Andy Madley

3 December 2016 19	Norwich City	5–0	Brentford	Norwich
15:00 GMT	Murphy 6'; Dorrans 16'; Naismith (yellow card) 44'; Brady 59'; Oliveira 79'; Pritchard 88'	Report		Stadium: Carrow Road; Attendance: 26,076; Referee: Geoff Eltringham

10 December 2016 20	Brentford	2–1	Burton Albion	Brentford
15:00 GMT	Hogan 11', 53'; McEachran (yellow card) 57'; Colin (yellow card) 62'; Bjelland (yellow card) 90+4'; Yennaris (yellow card) 90+7'; Sawyers (yellow card) 90+7'	Report	Ward 27'; Irvine (yellow card) 66'; Mousinho (yellow card) 72'; McLaughlin (yellow card) 90+7'; Turner (yellow card) 90+7'	Stadium: Griffin Park; Attendance: 9,035; Referee: David Coote

13 December 2016 21	Bristol City	0–1	Brentford	Bristol
19:45 GMT	Tomlin (yellow card) 73'; Smith (yellow card) 87'	Report	Colin 69'	Stadium: Ashton Gate Stadium; Attendance: 16,444; Referee: Andy Woolmer

18 December 2016 22	Leeds United	1–0	Brentford	Leeds
15:00 GMT	Bartley (yellow card) 51' (goal) 89'	Report	Egan (yellow card) 74'	Stadium: Elland Road; Attendance: 25,134; Referee: Darren Bond

26 December 2016 23	Brentford	2–2	Cardiff City	Brentford
13:00 GMT	Bjelland (yellow card) 23'; Hogan (yellow card) 73'; Dean (yellow card) 75'; Kaikai 83', 90+1'	Report	Whittingham 24' (pen.) (yellow card) 31'; Gunnarsson (yellow card) 73'; Zohore 89'	Stadium: Griffin Park; Attendance: 11,098; Referee: Simon Hooper

31 December 2016 24	Brentford	0–0	Norwich City	Brentford
17:30 GMT	McEachran (yellow card) 32'; Barbet (yellow card) 87'; Dean (yellow card) 90+3'	Report	Brady (red card) 80'; Tettey (yellow card) 90+5'	Stadium: Griffin Park; Attendance: 9,377; Referee: Oliver Langford

2 January 2017 25	Birmingham City	1–3	Brentford	Birmingham
15:00 GMT	Jutkiewicz 23'; Tesche (yellow card) 32'; Shotton (yellow card) 57'	Report	Bjelland (yellow card) 16'; Hogan 54'; Egan (yellow card) 67'; Davis 73' (o.g.); Yennaris 87'	Stadium: St Andrew's; Attendance: 18,030; Referee: James Adcock

14 January 2017 26	Brentford	1–2	Newcastle United	Brentford
15:00 GMT	Vibe 52' (yellow card) 81'	Report	Gayle 20'; Dummett (yellow card) 31'; Murphy 79'	Stadium: Griffin Park; Attendance: 11,435; Referee: Chris Kavanagh

21 January 2017 27	Wigan Athletic	1–2	Brentford	Wigan
15:00 GMT	Morsy 28'; Dean 32' (o.g.); MacDonald (yellow card) 36'	Report	Jota 86'	Stadium: DW Stadium; Attendance: 10,244; Referee: James Adcock

31 January 2017 28	Brentford	3–0	Aston Villa	Brentford, London
19:45 GMT	Vibe 25' 65'; Yennaris (yellow card) 33' (goal) 38'	Report	Hourihane (yellow card) 74'	Stadium: Griffin Park; Attendance: 10,016; Referee: David Coote

5 February 2017 29	Brentford	3–3	Brighton & Hove Albion	Brentford, London
15:00 GMT	Jota 15'; Dean 22'; Vibe (penalty missed) 57'; McEachran (yellow card) 64'; Kerschbaumer (yellow card) 90+2' (goal) 90+4'	Report	Sidwell (yellow card) 64'; March 75'; Duffy 78'; Bruno (yellow card) 90+6'; Hemed 90+7'	Stadium: Griffin Park; Attendance: 10,433; Referee: Jeremy Simpson

11 February 2017 30	Preston North End	4–2	Brentford	Preston
15:00 GMT	McGeady 18', 76'; Robinson 52'; Horgan 77'	Report	Field 12'; Colin (yellow card) 29' (goal) 89'; McEachran (yellow card) 57'	Stadium: Deepdale; Attendance: 10,130; Referee: Tony Harrington

14 February 2017 31	Reading	3–2	Brentford	Reading
20:00 GMT	Swift 22'; Williams 77' (yellow card) 82'; Beerens 81'; Mutch (yellow card) 90+4'	Report	Canós (yellow card) 55'; Jota (yellow card) 57' (goal) 63'; Vibe 66'; Woods (yellow card) 72'	Stadium: Madejski Stadium; Attendance: 15,710; Referee: Keith Stroud

21 February 2017 32	Sheffield Wednesday	1–2	Brentford	Sheffield
19:45 GMT	Forestieri (yellow card) 41' (goal) 90+3'	Report	Egan 35'; Dean 44' (yellow card) 90+4'; Sawyers (yellow card) 76'; Yennaris (yellow card) 84'	Stadium: Hillsborough; Attendance: 25,014; Referee: Darren Bond

25 February 2017 33	Brentford	4–2	Rotherham United	Brentford, London
15:00 GMT	Jota 13' 90+2' 90+5'; Yennaris (yellow card) 34' (goal) 78'	Report	Taylor (yellow card) 16'; Forde (yellow card) 60' (goal) 87'; Belaïd 67'	Stadium: Griffin Park; Attendance: 9,918; Referee: Andy Davies

4 March 2017 34	Ipswich Town	1–1	Brentford	Ipswich
15:00 GMT	Huws 26'	Report	Yennaris 44'	Stadium: Portman Road; Attendance: 15,863; Referee: Scott Duncan

7 March 2017 35	Nottingham Forest	2–3	Brentford	West Bridgford
15:00 GMT	Ward (yellow card) 38'; Cash (yellow card) 66'; Brereton 82'; Clough 90+3'	Report	Vibe 17', 55'; Henry (yellow card) 63'; Jota 68'	Stadium: City Ground; Attendance: 16,903; Referee: Tim Robinson

11 March 2017 36	Brentford	0–1	Huddersfield Town	Brentford, London
15:00 GMT	Dean (yellow card) 38'	Report	van La Parra 28'	Stadium: Griffin Park; Attendance: 11,278; Referee: Oliver Langford

15 March 2017 37	Brentford	1–2	Wolverhampton Wanderers	Brentford, London
19:45 GMT	Colin 31'; Egan (yellow card) 34'; Canós (yellow card) 51'	Report	Batth (yellow card) 74'; Doherty 86'; Costa 89'	Stadium: Griffin Park; Attendance: 8,732; Referee: Keith Stroud

18 March 2017 38	Burton Albion	3–5	Brentford	Burton upon Trent
15:00 GMT	Sordell 21', 23'; Woodrow 41'	Report	Canós 10', 61'; Vibe 51', 85'; Jota (yellow card) 67' (goal) 86'	Stadium: Pirelli Stadium; Attendance: 4,549; Referee: Andy Madley

1 April 2017 39	Brentford	2–0	Bristol City	Brentford, London
15:00 BST	Canós 18'; Vibe 26'	Report	Bryan (yellow card) 12'; O'Neil (yellow card) 35'	Stadium: Griffin Park; Attendance: 11,360; Referee: Simon Hooper

4 April 2017 40	Brentford	2–0	Leeds United	Brentford, London
19:45 BST	Sawyers 18' (yellow card) 84'; Vibe 34'; McCormack (yellow card) 74'	Report		Stadium: Griffin Park; Attendance: 10,759; Referee: David Coote

8 April 2017 41	Cardiff City	2–1	Brentford	Cardiff
15:00 BST	Whittingham (yellow card) 39' (goal) 76'; Morrison 47'; Hoilett (yellow card) 88'	Report	Canós 42'	Stadium: Cardiff City Stadium; Attendance: 15,861; Referee: Darren Bond

14 April 2017 42	Brentford	4–0	Derby County	Brentford, London
15:00 BST	Vibe 32', 82'; Woods (yellow card) 51'; Barbet (yellow card) 61'; Jota 70', 90'	Report	Baird (yellow card) 31'; Johnson (yellow card) 50'; Olsson (yellow card) 72'	Stadium: Griffin Park; Attendance: 11,133; Referee: Tim Robinson

17 April 2017 43	Barnsley	1–1	Brentford	Barnsley
15:00 BST	Watkins 28'; MacDonald (yellow card) 60'	Report	Jozefzoon 41'; Jota (penalty missed) 47'	Stadium: Oakwell; Attendance: 13,935; Referee: Robert Jones

22 April 2017 44	Brentford	3–1	Queens Park Rangers	Brentford, London
15:00 BST	Barbet 31'; Jota 60' (pen.), 64' (yellow card) 65'	Report	Freeman (yellow card) 42'; Perch (yellow card) 47'; Lynch (yellow card) 60' (goal) 62'	Stadium: Griffin Park; Attendance: 11,888; Referee: James Adcock

29 April 2017 45	Fulham	1–1	Brentford	Fulham, London
15:00 BST	Cairney 8' (penalty missed) 45'+2'; Johansen (yellow card) 90+2'	Report	Yennaris 34'	Stadium: Craven Cottage; Attendance: 24,594; Referee: Darren Bond

7 May 2017 46	Brentford	1–3	Blackburn Rovers	Brentford, London
12:00 BST	Vibe 56'; Dean (yellow card) 78' (yellow-red card) 83'	Report	Mulgrew 10'; Guthrie 16'; Conway (yellow card) 78' (goal) 83' (pen.)	Stadium: Griffin Park; Attendance: 11,969; Referee: Tony Harrington

== League Cup ==
On 22 June 2015, Brentford were beaten 1:0 by Exeter City in the first round of the EFL Cup.

9 August 2016 First round	Exeter City	1–0 (a.e.t.)	Brentford	Exeter
19:45 BST	Harley (yellow card) 78' (goal) 100'	Report	Woods (yellow card) 54'; Saunders (yellow card) 56'; Field (yellow card) 75'	Stadium: St James Park; Attendance: 2,633; Referee: Kevin Johnson

== FA Cup ==
7 January 2017 Third round	Brentford	5–1	Eastleigh	Brentford, London
15:00 GMT	Barbet 9' (pen.); Field 17', 38'; Vibe 23'; McEachran (yellow card) 31'; Sawyers 45+2'	Report	Stack (yellow card) 6'; Obileye 29'; Reason (yellow card) 43'	Stadium: Griffin Park; Attendance: 7,537; Referee: Peter Bankes

28 January 2017 Fourth round	Chelsea	4–0	Brentford	Fulham, London
15:00 GMT	Willian 14'; Pedro 21'; Ivanović 69'; Batshuayi 81'; Chalobah (yellow card) 89'	Report	Colin (yellow card) 55'	Stadium: Stamford Bridge; Attendance: 41,042; Referee: Michael Oliver

== First team squad ==
Players' ages are as of the opening day of the 2016–17 season.

Squad No.	Name	Nationality	Position	Date of birth (age)	Signed from	Signed in	Notes
Goalkeepers
1	Dan Bentley	(England)	GK	13 July 1993 (aged 23)	Southend United	2016	
16	Jack Bonham	(Republic of Ireland)	GK	14 September 1993 (aged 22)	Watford	2013	
34	Dominic Kurasik	(Australia)	GK	4 November 1996 (aged 19)	Stoke City	2016	
37	Ellery Balcombe	(England)	GK	15 October 1999 (aged 16)	Academy	2016	
Defenders
2	Maxime Colin	(France)	RB	15 November 1991 (aged 24)	RSC Anderlecht	2015	
5	Andreas Bjelland	(Denmark)	CB / LB	11 July 1988 (aged 28)	FC Twente	2015	
6	Harlee Dean	(England)	CB	26 July 1991 (aged 25)	Southampton	2012	
14	John Egan	(Republic of Ireland)	CB	20 October 1992 (aged 23)	Gillingham	2016	
22	Rico Henry	(Jamaica)	LB	8 July 1997 (aged 19)	Walsall	2016	
29	Yoann Barbet	(France)	CB / LB	10 May 1993 (aged 23)	Chamois Niortais	2015	
30	Tom Field	(Republic of Ireland)	LB	14 March 1997 (aged 19)	Academy	2015	
35	Ilias Chatzitheodoridis	(Greece)	LB	5 November 1997 (aged 18)	Arsenal	2016	
36	Manny Onariase	(England)	CB	21 October 1996 (aged 19)	West Ham United	2016	Loaned to Cheltenham Town
38	Chris Mepham	(Wales)	CB	5 November 1997 (aged 18)	Academy	2016	
Midfielders
4	Lewis Macleod	(Scotland)	LM / AM	16 June 1994 (aged 22)	Rangers	2015	
8	Nico Yennaris	(China)	CM	24 May 1993 (aged 23)	Arsenal	2014	
10	Josh McEachran	(England)	CM	1 March 1993 (aged 23)	Chelsea	2015	
12	Alan McCormack	(Republic of Ireland)	CM / RB	10 January 1984 (aged 32)	Swindon Town	2013	
15	Ryan Woods	(England)	CM	13 December 1993 (aged 22)	Shrewsbury Town	2015	
17	Konstantin Kerschbaumer	(Austria)	CM / AM	1 July 1992 (aged 24)	Admira Wacker Mödling	2015	
18	Alan Judge	(Republic of Ireland)	AM / LM	11 November 1988 (aged 27)	Blackburn Rovers	2014	
19	Romaine Sawyers	(Saint Kitts and Nevis)	AM / CM	2 November 1991 (aged 24)	Walsall	2016	
20	Josh Clarke	(England)	RW / RB	5 July 1994 (aged 22)	Academy	2013	
23	Jota	(Spain)	AM / RM	16 June 1991 (aged 25)	Celta de Vigo	2014	Loaned to SD Eibar
24	Akaki Gogia	(Germany)	AM / LM	18 January 1992 (aged 24)	Hallescher FC	2015	Loaned to Dynamo Dresden
31	Jan Holldack	(Germany)	CM / CB / RB	11 May 1996 (aged 20)	1. FC Köln	2015	Loaned to Wuppertaler SV
32	Reece Cole	(England)	CM	17 February 1998 (aged 18)	Academy	2016	
39	Zain Westbrooke	(England)	CM	28 October 1996 (aged 19)	Academy	2015	
47	Sergi Canós	(Spain)	RW / LW	2 February 1997 (aged 19)	Norwich City	2017	
Forwards
7	Florian Jozefzoon	(Suriname)	RW / LW	9 February 1991 (aged 25)	PSV Eindhoven	2017	
11	Philipp Hofmann	(Germany)	ST	30 March 1993 (aged 23)	1. FC Kaiserslautern	2015	
21	Lasse Vibe	(Denmark)	ST / RW	22 February 1987 (aged 29)	IFK Göteborg	2015	
33	Justin Shaibu	(Denmark)	ST	28 October 1997 (aged 18)	HB Køge	2016	
Players who departed mid-season
3	Callum Elder	(Australia)	LB	27 January 1995 (aged 21)	Leicester City	2016	Returned to Leicester City after loan
7	Sam Saunders	(England)	RM	29 August 1983 (aged 32)	Dagenham & Redbridge	2009	Transferred to Wycombe Wanderers
9	Scott Hogan	(Republic of Ireland)	ST	13 April 1992 (aged 24)	Rochdale	2014	Transferred to Aston Villa
25	Sullay Kaikai	(Sierra Leone)	RM / LM	26 August 1995 (aged 20)	Crystal Palace	2016	Returned to Crystal Palace after loan
26	Emmanuel Ledesma	(Argentina)	AM / LM / RM	24 May 1988 (aged 28)	Rotherham United	2016	Non-contract

Source: soccerbase.com
Italic: denotes player is no longer with team

== Coaching staff ==
Last updated 8 December 2016

	Role
Dean Smith	Head Coach
Richard O'Kelly	Assistant Head Coach
Thomas Frank	Assistant Head Coach
Bartek Sylwestrzak	Technical Coach
Vacant	Performance Psychologist
Simon Royce	Goalkeeping Coach
Luke Stopforth	Head of Analysis
Daryl Martin	Physiotherapist
Richard Clarke	Physiotherapist
Chris Haslam	Head of Athletic Performance
Tom Perryman	Conditioning Coach
James Purdue	Conditioning Coach
Neil Greig	Head of Medical
Bob Oteng	Kit Logistics Manager

== Kit ==
On 22 July, the kit for the 2016–17 season was revealed. The kit sponsor was changed from matchbook.com, the previous season's sponsor, to 888sport, an online bookmaker. Adidas remained as the kit supplier.

Supplier: adidas
Sponsor(s): 888sport, University of West London

Home	Away	Away Alt.	Third	Goalkeeper 1	Goalkeeper 2

Source: brentfordfc.co.uk

== Statistics ==
=== Appearances and goals ===
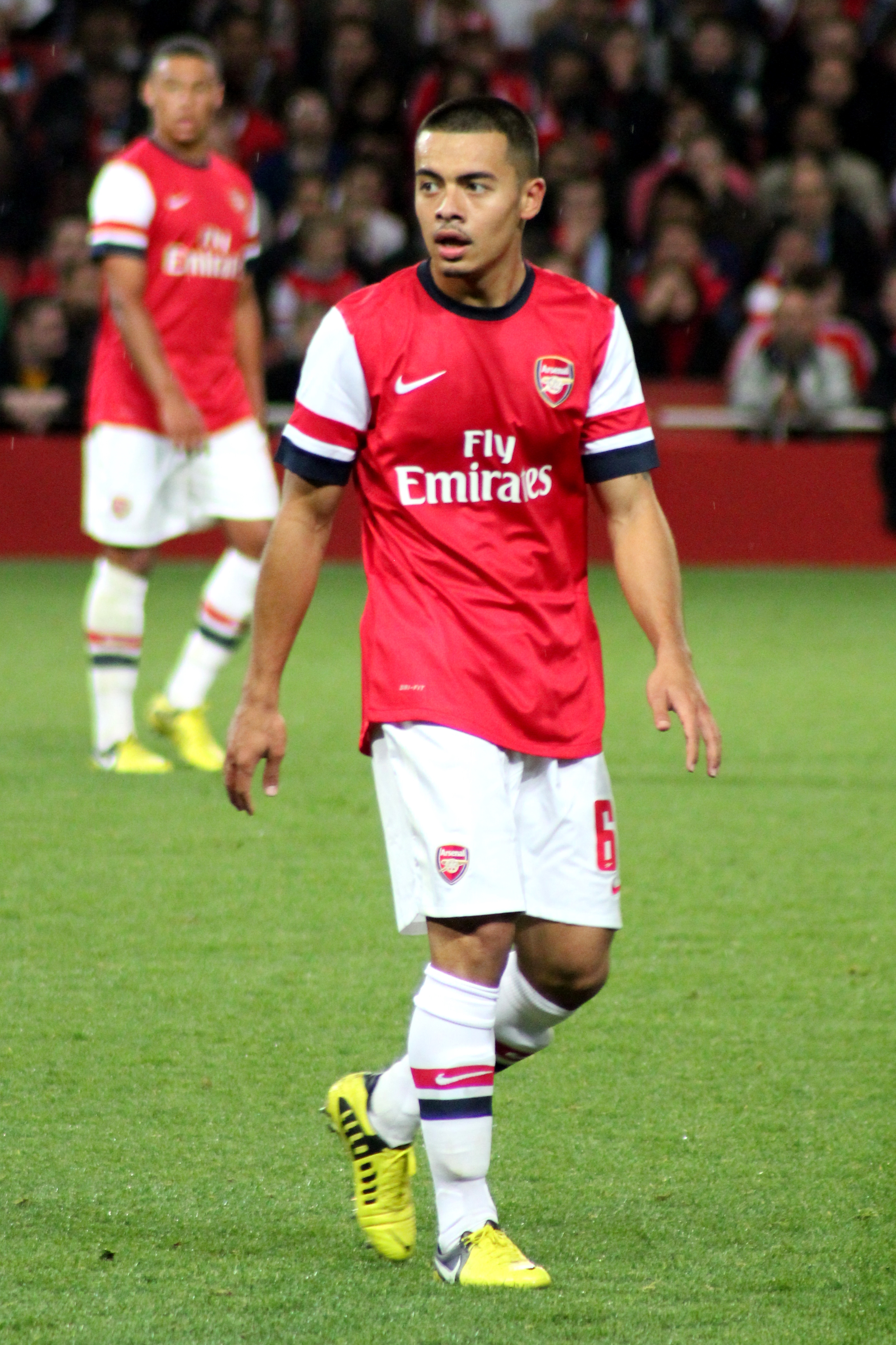
Nico Yennaris was an ever-present for Brentford during the season.

Last Updated 7 May 2017

No.	Pos	Nat	Player	Total		Championship		FA Cup		League Cup	
No.	Pos	Nat	Player	Apps	Goals	Apps	Goals	Apps	Goals	Apps	Goals
1	GK	(England) ENG	Dan Bentley	47	0	45+0	0	2+0	0	0+0	0
2	DF	(France) FRA	Maxime Colin	40	4	38+0	4	2+0	0	0+0	0
4	MF	(Scotland) SCO	Lewis Macleod	13	0	10+3	0	0+0	0	0+0	0
5	DF	(Denmark) DEN	Andreas Bjelland	29	0	25+3	0	1+0	0	0+0	0
6	DF	(England) ENG	Harlee Dean	45	3	42+0	3	2+0	0	1+0	0
7	MF	(Suriname) SUR	Florian Jozefzoon	19	1	6+13	1	0+0	0	0+0	0
8	MF	(China) CHN	Nico Yennaris	49	6	39+7	6	2+0	0	1+0	0
10	MF	(England) ENG	Josh McEachran	29	0	14+13	0	2+0	0	0+0	0
11	FW	(Germany) GER	Philipp Hofmann	11	0	0+10	0	0+0	0	1+0	0
12	MF	(Ireland) EIR	Alan McCormack	12	0	2+9	0	0+0	0	1+0	0
14	DF	(Ireland) EIR	John Egan	37	4	34+0	4	2+0	0	1+0	0
15	MF	(England) ENG	Ryan Woods	45	0	42+0	0	2+0	0	0+1	0
16	GK	(Ireland) EIR	Jack Bonham	2	0	1+0	0	0+0	0	1+0	0
17	MF	(Austria) AUT	Konstantin Kerschbaumer	21	1	9+11	1	0+1	0	0+0	0
18	MF	(Ireland) EIR	Alan Judge	0	0	0+0	0	0+0	0	0+0	0
19	MF	(Saint Kitts and Nevis) SKN	Romaine Sawyers	45	3	39+4	2	2+0	1	0+0	0
20	MF	(England) ENG	Josh Clarke	32	2	19+11	2	0+1	0	1+0	0
21	FW	(Denmark) DEN	Lasse Vibe	36	16	30+4	15	2+0	1	0+0	0
22	DF	(Jamaica) JAM	Rico Henry	12	0	12+0	0	0+0	0	0+0	0
23	MF	(Spain) ESP	Jota	23	12	19+2	12	0+2	0	0+0	0
29	DF	(France) FRA	Yoann Barbet	24	2	14+8	1	2+0	1	0+0	0
30	DF	(Ireland) EIR	Tom Field	17	3	13+2	1	1+0	2	1+0	0
31	MF	(Germany) GER	Jan Holldack	1	0	0+0	0	0+0	0	1+0	0
32	MF	(England) ENG	Reece Cole	1	0	0+1	0	0+0	0	0+0	0
33	FW	(Denmark) DEN	Justin Shaibu	5	0	0+4	0	0+0	0	0+1	0
34	GK	(Australia) AUS	Dominic Kurasik	0	0	0+0	0	0+0	0	0+0	0
35	DF	(Greece) GRE	Ilias Chatzitheodoridis	0	0	0+0	0	0+0	0	0+0	0
36	DF	(England) ENG	Manny Onariase	0	0	0+0	0	0+0	0	0+0	0
37	GK	(England) ENG	Ellery Balcombe	0	0	0+0	0	0+0	0	0+0	0
38	DF	(Wales) WAL	Chris Mepham	1	0	0+0	0	0+1	0	0+0	0
39	MF	(England) ENG	Zain Westbrooke	1	0	0+1	0	0+0	0	0+0	0
47	FW	(Spain) ESP	Sergi Canós	18	4	13+5	4	0+0	0	0+0	0
3	DF	(Australia) AUS	Callum Elder	6	0	6+0	0	0+0	0	0+0	0
7	MF	(England) ENG	Sam Saunders	9	0	3+5	0	0+0	0	1+0	0
9	FW	(Republic of Ireland) IRL	Scott Hogan	27	14	25+0	14	0+1	0	0+1	0
25	MF	(Sierra Leone) SLE	Sullay Kaikai	18	3	6+12	3	0+0	0	0+0	0
26	MF	(Argentina) ARG	Emmanuel Ledesma	2	0	0+1	0	0+0	0	1+0	0

Source: brentfordfc.co.uk
Italic: denotes player is no longer with team

=== Goalscorers ===
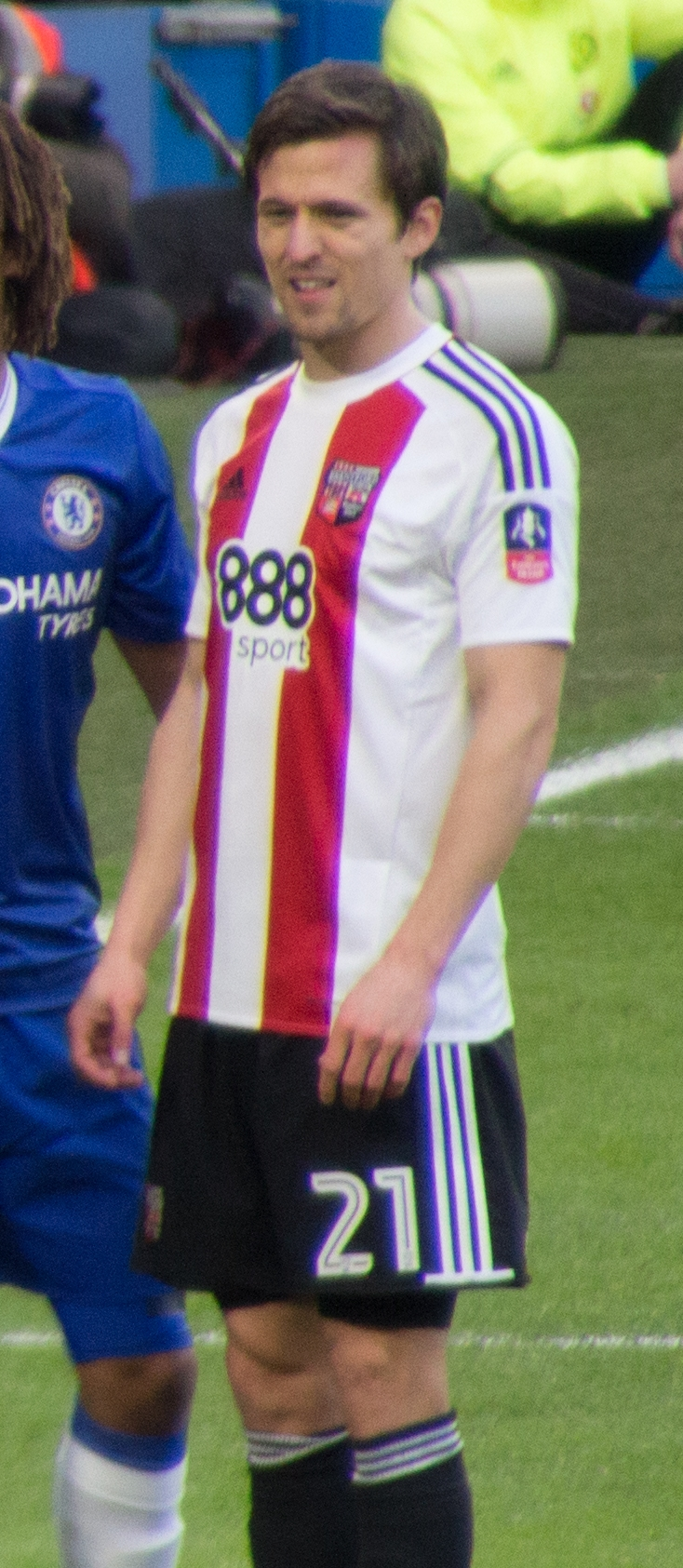
Lasse Vibe was this season's top goalscorer with 16 goals.

No.	Pos	Player	Championship	FA Cup	EFL Cup	Total
21	FW	Lasse Vibe	15	1	0	16
9	FW	Scott Hogan	14	0	0	14
23	MF	Jota	12	0	0	12
8	MF	Nico Yennaris	6	0	0	6
2	DF	Maxime Colin	4	0	0	4
14	DF	John Egan	4	0	0	4
47	FW	Sergi Canós	4	0	0	4
6	DF	Harlee Dean	3	0	0	3
19	MF	Romaine Sawyers	2	1	0	3
25	MF	Sullay Kaikai	3	0	0	3
30	DF	Tom Field	1	2	0	3
20	MF	Josh Clarke	2	0	0	2
29	DF	Yoann Barbet	1	1	0	2
7	MF	Florian Jozefzoon	1	0	0	1
17	MF	Konstantin Kerschbaumer	1	0	0	1
		Own Goals	2	0	0	2
		Totals	75	5	0	80

Source: brentfordfc.co.uk
Italic: denotes player is no longer with team

=== Disciplinary record ===
Last Updated 7 May 2017

No.	Pos	Player	Yellow card	Red card
6	DF	Harlee Dean	12	1
21	FW	Lasse Vibe	3	1
15	MF	Ryan Woods	8	0
2	DF	Maxime Colin	7	0
10	MF	Josh McEachran	7	0
14	DF	John Egan	7	0
8	MF	Nico Yennaris	6	0
19	MF	Romaine Sawyers	6	0
5	DF	Andreas Bjelland	5	0
9	FW	Scott Hogan	3	0
12	MF	Alan McCormack	3	0
23	MF	Jota	3	0
29	DF	Yoann Barbet	2	0
47	FW	Sergi Canós	2	0
1	GK	Dan Bentley	1	0
7	MF	Sam Saunders	1	0
17	MF	Konstantin Kerschbaumer	1	0
21	FW	Lasse Vibe	1	0
22	DF	Rico Henry	1	0
30	DF	Tom Field	1	0
		Totals	80	2

Source: brentfordfc.co.uk
Italic: denotes player is no longer with team

=== Management ===
Name	Nat	From	To	Record All Comps					Record League				
Name	Nat	From	To	P	W	D	L	W %	P	W	D	L	W %
Dean Smith	(England)	30 November 2015	present	49	19	10	20	38.78|	46	18	10	18	39.13

=== Summary ===
Games played	49 (46 Championship, 2 FA Cup, 1 League Cup)
Games won	19 (18 Championship, 1 FA Cup, 0 League Cup)
Games drawn	10 (10 Championship, 0 FA Cup, 0 League Cup)
Games lost	20 (18 Championship, 1 FA Cup, 1 League Cup)
Goals scored	80 (75 Championship, 5 FA Cup, 0 League Cup)
Goals conceded	71 (65 Championship, 5 FA Cup, 1 League Cup)
Clean sheets	13 (13 Championship, 0 FA Cup, 0 League Cup)
Yellow cards	80 (75 Championship, 2 FA Cup, 3 League Cup)
Red cards	2 (2 Championship, 0 FA Cup, 0 League Cup)
Worst discipline	(12 yellows and 1 red) Harlee Dean
Biggest league win	5–0 (vs Preston North End)
Worst league defeat	0–5 (vs Norwich City)
Most appearances	49 Nico Yennaris
Top scorer (league)	15 Lasse Vibe
Top scorer (all competitions)	16 Lasse Vibe
Hat Tricks	2 Scott Hogan (vs Preston North End) & Jota (vs Rotherham United)
