= Jan Holldack =

German footballer

Personal information
- Full name: Jan Holldack
- Date of birth: 11 May 1996 (age 30)
- Place of birth: Neunkirchen, Germany
- Height: 1.81 m (5 ft 11 in)
- Position: Midfielder

Team information
- Current team: Rot Weiss Ahlen

Youth career
- –2011: Hennef 05
- 2011–2015: 1. FC Köln

Senior career*
Years	Team	Apps	(Gls)
2015–2017	Brentford	0	(0)
2017	→ Sportfreunde Lotte (loan)	0	(0)
2017	→ Wuppertaler SV (loan)	12	(3)
2017–2019	KFC Uerdingen 05	36	(2)
2019–2020	Bonner SC	15	(3)
2020	VfR Aalen	3	(0)
2020–2021	Rot Weiss Ahlen	28	(5)
2021	RC Grasse	0	(0)
2021–2023	Rot Weiss Ahlen	56	(19)
2023–2026	1. FC Bocholt	76	(16)
2026–	Rot Weiss Ahlen	11	(2)

International career
2013	Germany U18	2	(0)
- * Club domestic league appearances and goals as of 21:33, 9 August 2026 (UTC)

Jan Holldack (born 11 May 1996) is a German semi-professional footballer who plays as a midfielder for Westfalenliga club Rot Weiss Ahlen.

Holldack is a product of the 1. FC Köln academy and represented Germany at U18 level. He began his professional career with English club Brentford and entered German lower-league football upon his departure in 2017.

== Club career ==
=== Early years ===
Adept in midfield or as a defender, Holldack began his career in his homeland with Hennef 05, before joining Bundesliga club 1. FC Köln in 2011. He made 78 appearances and scored six goals for the club's U17 and U19 teams between 2012 and 2015. He progressed to the club's reserve team in March 2015 and was an unused substitute during three Regionalliga West matches in March 2015. Holldack departed the Müngersdorfer Stadion at the end of the 2014–15 season.

=== Brentford ===
Holldack moved to England to sign a two-year Development Squad contract with Championship club Brentford on 1 July 2015. He performed the role of a utility player during the 2015–16 season and scored 14 goals in 31 appearances. After featuring regularly during the 2016–17 pre-season, a spate of injuries saw Holldack called into the first team squad for the opening match of the season versus Huddersfield Town. He remained an unused substitute during the 2–1 defeat and made the first senior appearance of his career with a start in the following match, playing at right back in a 1–0 EFL Cup first round extra time loss to Exeter City on 9 August 2016. Despite failing to win a further first team call-up, head coach Dean Smith remarked in early January 2017 that Holldack had been "constantly" training with the first team squad.

After a period on trial with Sportfreunde Lotte at the club's winter training camp and featuring as an unused substitute during a 3. Liga match, Holldack moved on loan to Regionalliga West club Wuppertaler SV until the end of the 2016–17 season on 20 January 2017. He made his debut with a start versus Fortuna Düsseldorf II on 10 February and scored the first senior goal of his career in the 5–1 victory. Holldack made 13 appearances and scored three goals during his spell at the Stadion am Zoo. Holldack signed a one-year contract extension with Brentford on 22 June 2017, but after failing to win any further first team call ups, he departed the club on 31 August 2017.

=== KFC Uerdingen 05 ===
On 31 August 2017, Holldack returned to Germany to join Regionalliga West club KFC Uerdingen 05 on two-year contract. In what remained of the 2017–18 season, he made 26 appearances, scored two goals and celebrated promotion to the 3. Liga after victory in the Regionalliga promotion play-offs. Holldack made 19 appearances and scored one goal during the 2018–19 season and was part of the club's Lower Rhine Cup-winning squad. He was released in June 2019, after making 45 appearances and scoring three goals for the club.

=== Bonner SC ===
On 2 July 2019, Holldack joined Regionalliga West club Bonner SC on a one-year contract. He made 15 appearances and scored three goals before his departure in January 2020.

=== VfR Aalen ===
On 11 January 2020, Holldack transferred to Regionalliga Südwest club VfR Aalen on an 18-month contract. He failed to win a call into a matchday squad before the Regionalliga Südwest season was ended prematurely. After making three early-2020–21 season appearances, Holldack had his contract terminated by mutual consent on 2 October 2020.

=== Rot Weiss Ahlen ===
In October 2020, Holldack transferred to Regionalliga West club Rot Weiss Ahlen. During what remained of the 2020–21 season, he made 28 appearances and scored five goals and departed the club at the end of the campaign.

=== RC Grasse ===
On 21 July 2021, Holldack transferred to French Championnat National 2 club RC Grasse. Three weeks later, personal issues saw him depart the club.

=== Return to Rot Weiss Ahlen ===
In August 2021, Holldack returned to Regionalliga West club Rot Weiss Ahlen and signed a two-year contract. He made 29 appearances and scored 9 goals during a mid-table 2021–22 season. Holldack's desire to leave the club during the 2022 off-season saw him frozen out of the squad, though he returned to the team for the opening match of the 2022–23 season. He made 30 appearances and scored a career-high 13 goals during the 2022–23 season, in which the club narrowly avoided relegation. Holldack departed the club in May 2023 and made 84 appearances across his two spells, scoring 24 goals.

=== 1. FC Bocholt ===
On 4 May 2023, Holldack transferred to Regionalliga West club 1. FC Bocholt and signed a two-year contract. He made 33 appearances and scored three goals during a 2023–24 season in which the club finished second in the division, albeit 12 points behind the automatic promotion place. Holldack signed a new "long-term" contract in June 2024 and was named captain one month later. He made 33 appearances and scored 13 goals during a mid-table 2024–25 season. After 18 further appearances goals during the first half of the 2025–26 season, Holldack departed the club in January 2026, after agreeing a mutual termination of his contract. He made 84 appearances and scored 19 goals during 2 1/2 years at the Stadion am Hünting.

=== Second return to Rot Weiss Ahlen ===
On 20 January 2026, Holldack made a second return to Rot Weiss Ahlen and signed a 2 1/2 year contract. He made 10 Oberliga Westfalen appearances and scored one goal during the remainder of the 2025–26 season, which culminated in relegation.

== International career ==
Holldack won two caps for Germany at U18 level, appearing in matches versus Moldova U19 and Serbia U18 during a friendly tournament in Israel in December 2013.

== Personal life ==
During his second spell with Rot Weiss Ahlen, Holldack shared a flat with teammate Andreas Ivan.

== Career statistics ==
As of match played 7 August 2026

Appearances and goals by club, season and competition
Club	Season	League			National cup (Note: Includes FA Cup)		League cup (Note: Includes EFL Cup)		Other		Total	
Club	Season	Division	Apps	Goals	Apps	Goals	Apps	Goals	Apps	Goals	Apps	Goals
1. FC Köln II	2014–15	Regionalliga West	0	0	—		—		—		0	0
Brentford	2016–17	Championship	0	0	0	0	1	0	—		1	0
Sportfreunde Lotte (loan)	2016–17	3. Liga	0	0	—		—		—		0	0
Wuppertaler SV (loan)	2016–17	Regionalliga West	12	3	—		—		1 (Note: Appearance(s) in Lower Rhine Cup)	0	13	3
KFC Uerdingen 05	2017–18	Regionalliga West	21	2	—		—		5 (Note: 3 appearances in Lower Rhine Cup, 2 appearances in Regionalliga promotion play-offs)	0	26	2
KFC Uerdingen 05	2018–19	3. Liga	15	0	—		—		4	1	19	1
KFC Uerdingen 05	Total		36	2	—		—		9	1	45	3
Bonner SC	2019–20	Regionalliga West	15	3	—		—		—		15	3
VfR Aalen	2020–21	Regionalliga Südwest	3	0	—		—		—		3	0
Rot Weiss Ahlen	2020–21	Regionalliga West	28	5	—		—		—		28	5
Rot Weiss Ahlen	2021–22	Regionalliga West	28	9	—		—		1 (Note: Appearance(s) in Westphalian Cup)	0	29	9
Rot Weiss Ahlen	2022–23	Regionalliga West	28	10	—		—		2	3	30	13
Rot Weiss Ahlen	Total		84	24	—		—		3	3	87	27
1. FC Bocholt	2023–24	Regionalliga West	31	3	—		—		2	0	33	3
1. FC Bocholt	2024–25	Regionalliga West	29	10	—		—		4	3	33	13
1. FC Bocholt	2025–26	Regionalliga West	16	3	—		—		2	0	18	3
1. FC Bocholt	Total		76	16	—		—		8	3	84	19
Rot Weiss Ahlen	2025–26	Oberliga Westfalen	10	1	—		—		—		10	1
Rot Weiss Ahlen	2026–27	Westfalenliga Group 1	1	1	—		—		—		1	1
Rot Weiss Ahlen	Total		11	2	—		—		—		11	2
Career total			237	50	0	0	1	0	21	7	259	57

== Honours ==
KFC Uerdingen 05

- Regionalliga promotion play-offs: 2018
- Lower Rhine Cup: 2018–19
