= Andreas Bjelland =

Danish footballer (born 1988)

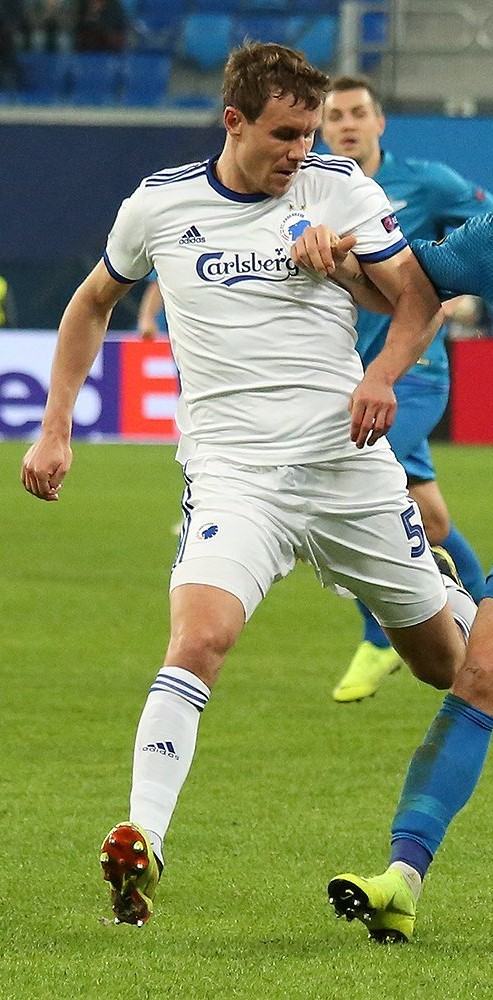
- Bjelland playing for Copenhagen in 2018

Personal information
- Full name: Andreas Bjelland
- Date of birth: 11 July 1988 (age 38)
- Place of birth: Fredensborg, Denmark
- Height: 1.88 m (6 ft 2 in)
- Position: Centre-back

Team information
- Current team: Lyngby (joint-manager)

Youth career
- Fredensborg BI
- –2001: BSV
- 2001–2006: Lyngby

Senior career*
Years	Team	Apps	(Gls)
2006–2009	Lyngby	46	(1)
2009–2012	Nordsjælland	72	(3)
2012–2015	Twente	65	(3)
2015–2018	Brentford	62	(1)
2018–2022	Copenhagen	54	(1)
2021–2022	→ Lyngby (loan)	24	(1)
2022–2025	Lyngby	46	(1)
Total		369	(11)

International career
2004	Denmark U16	1	(0)
2006	Denmark U18	1	(0)
2006	Denmark U19	3	(0)
2009–2011	Denmark U21	16	(0)
2010–2018	Denmark	29	(2)

Managerial career
- 2025–: Lyngby (joint-manager)
- * Club domestic league appearances and goals

Andreas Bjelland (born 11 July 1988) is a Danish-Norwegian former professional footballer who played as a centre-back. He is currently joint-manager of Lyngby.

Bjelland began his professional career in his homeland with Lyngby and established himself in the top division of Danish football with FC Nordsjælland. He played in the Netherlands and England for FC Twente and Brentford between 2011 and 2018, Bjelland returned to Denmark to play for F.C. Copenhagen in 2018 and he ended his playing career with Lyngby in 2025. Bjelland represented Denmark at international level and was part of the Danes' Euro 2012 squad. He was also adept as a full back or defensive midfielder.

== Club career ==
=== Lyngby ===
A centre back, Bjelland began his career in his homeland with Fredensborg BI and BSV, before moving into the youth system at Superliga club Lyngby in 2001. Financial problems at the stricken club saw the Royal Blues relegated to the Danmarksserien, but by the time Bjelland made his senior debut in September 2006, they had risen back to the 1st Division. He made 9 appearances during the 2006–07 and after promotion to the Superliga, he made 11 appearances in 2007–08. After an immediate relegation back to the 1st Division, Bjelland finally broke into the team and during the 2008–09 season made 24 appearances and scored one goal. After five early-2009–10 season appearances, Bjelland departed Lyngby on 31 August 2009. He made 47 appearances and scored one goal for the club.

=== FC Nordsjælland ===
Bjelland returned to the Superliga to sign for FC Nordsjælland on 31 August 2009. He quickly established himself in the team and made 26 appearances, scoring one goal. His season was capped by success in the DBU Pokalen, with Nordsjælland beating Midtjylland 2–0 in the final after extra time. Bjelland had another successful season in 2010–11, being named vice-captain and again winning the DBU Pokalen at the expense of Midtjylland. He made 29 appearances and scored one goal in a 2011–12 season which saw Nordsjælland win the Superliga title for the first time in the club's history. Bjelland departed the club in June 2012, after making 85 appearances and scoring three goals during three seasons at Farum Park.

=== FC Twente ===
On 6 November 2011, it was announced that Bjelland had signed a four-year contract (with the option of a further year) with Dutch Eredivisie club FC Twente, effective from the beginning of the 2012–13 season. He had a debut season to forget at De Grolsch Veste, spending six months out with a broken metatarsal and making only 14 appearances. He came back fit for the 2013–14 season and was a virtual ever-present as Twente managed a third-place finish in the Eredivisie. Bjelland was named as captain for the 2014–15 season, but he was in and out of the team, due to injuries and suspensions. He left the club on 2 July 2015, after making 79 appearances and scoring three goals during his three seasons in Enschede.

=== Brentford ===
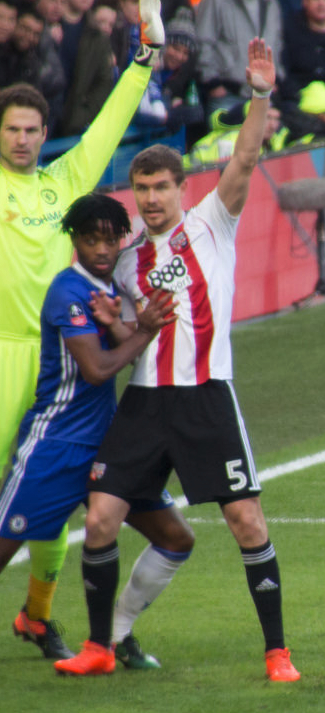
Bjelland (right) contesting a Brentford corner kick against Chelsea's Nathaniel Chalobah in January 2017.

On 2 July 2015, Bjelland moved to England to sign a three-year contract with Championship club Brentford for a club-record €3 million fee. After recovering from a groin injury suffered in pre-season, Bjelland made his debut for the club with a start in a League Cup first round match versus Oxford United on 11 August. He was at fault for Oxford's first goal of the 4–0 defeat and suffered a knee ligament injury on the stroke of half time.

Bjelland returned to full-contact training in late April 2016 and despite missing part of the 2016–17 pre-season with an abductor strain, he entered the regular season fit. He broke into the starting lineup in an unfamiliar left back role in mid-September 2016. After the team's formation was switched to 3–5–2 three months later, he reverted to his usual centre back position. Bjelland missed much of March and April 2017 through injury and finished the season with 29 appearances.

Bjelland deputised for the absent Harlee Dean early in the 2017–18 season scored his first Brentford goal in a 4–3 defeat to Nottingham Forest 12 August 2017. After Dean's departure at the end of the summer transfer window, Bjelland continued as an automatic pick for the remainder of the 2017–18 season. Despite suffering from an achilles problem during the final two months of the season, Bjelland finished the campaign with 35 appearances and one goal. After failing to agree a new contract, he was released on 30 June 2018. During three seasons at Griffin Park, Bjelland made 65 appearances and scored one goal.

=== F.C. Copenhagen ===
On 9 July 2018, Bjelland returned to Denmark to sign a four-year contract with Superliga club F.C. Copenhagen on a free transfer. The deal made him one of the highest-paid players in Danish Superliga history. He made 41 appearances and scored one goal during the club's 2018–19 Superliga-winning season. During a 2019–20 season which featured a run to the quarter-finals of the Europa League and a runners-up finish in the Superliga, Bjelland made 30 appearances. Bjelland made three appearances during the opening month of the 2020–21 season, before suffering a "bad cocktail" of problems with injury and COVID-19. He did not appear again before the end of the season. Bjelland spent the final year of his contract away on loan and was released when it expired.

=== Return to Lyngby ===
On 15 July 2021, Bjelland returned to Danish 1st Division club Lyngby on a season-long loan. He made 25 appearances and scored one goal during a 2021–22 season which culminated in promotion to the Danish Superliga. Taking a pay cut from his previous contract with F.C. Copenhagen, Bjelland signed a one-year contract with Lyngby in May 2022. On 28 August 2022, his sixth appearance of the 2022–23 season, Bjelland suffered a broken and dislocated ankle during a 2–1 defeat to Viborg. He underwent surgery five days later and returned fit for the resumption of the season after the winter break.

Bjelland signed a new two-year contract in May 2023 and made 18 appearances during a 2022–23 season in which Lyngby narrowly avoided relegation. A second-successive narrow miss with relegation in the 2023–24 season ended with 27 appearances and one goal. Bjelland appeared sparingly during the first half of the 2024–25 season and in November 2024, he stood in for assistant head coach Mikkel Beckmann, who was suspended from the touchline. He retired as a player to take up the role full time in January 2025. Across his two spells at the Lyngby Stadium, Bjelland made 122 appearances and scored three goals.

== International career ==
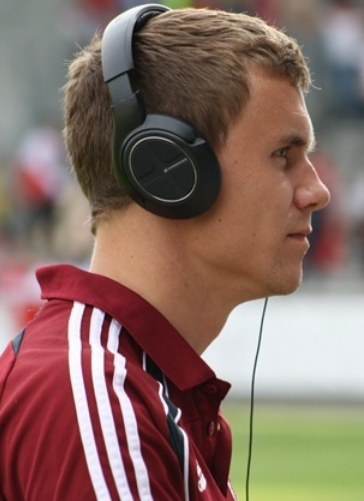
Bjelland prior to a Denmark U21 match in 2011.

=== Youth ===
Despite being eligible to represent Norway, Bjelland represented Denmark at U16, U18, U19 and U21 level, captaining the latter team and making three appearances at the 2011 European U21 Championship, hosted in Denmark.

=== Full ===
Bjelland made his full international debut in a 0–0 friendly draw with the Czech Republic on 17 November 2010 and played the full 90 minutes. He received his second call up 11 months later, when he was selected for a pair of Euro 2012 qualifiers against Cyprus and Portugal, in which he started and helped the team to wins. Bjelland scored his first international goal with penalty to seal a 2–0 friendly win over Australia on 2 June 2012. He was called into Denmark's squad for Euro 2012, but failed to make an appearance before the team crashed out in the group stage.

Following Euro 2012, a metatarsal injury suffered on club duty with Twente saw Bjelland miss a year of international football and he made his return in a 2–1 friendly win over Georgia on 5 June 2013. He scored his second international goal in a 6–0 2014 World Cup qualifying win over Malta on 15 October 2013. Bjelland made regular appearances through 2014, but a knee ligament injury meant that failed to appear for Denmark between June 2015 and 11 November 2016, when he made his comeback playing the full 90 minutes of a 4–0 2018 World Cup qualifying win over Kazakhstan. Bjelland was included in Denmark's preliminary squad for the 2018 World Cup, but was not named in the final selection, due to injury. Bjelland's final international cap came in a UEFA Nations League match versus the Republic of Ireland in November 2018 and he ended his senior international career with 29 caps and two goals.

== Coaching career ==
On 7 January 2025, it was announced that Bjelland had been appointed as assistant to head coach Morten Karlsen at Lyngby. In December 2025, together with Mikkel Jespersen, he was appointed joint-manager of the club. The pair guided the club to the 2025–26 Danish 1st Division championship and promotion to the Superliga.

== Personal life ==
Bjelland was born to a Norwegian father and a Danish mother. His younger brother Thomas was an amateur footballer. Bjelland has two daughters. In 2018, Bjelland invested a reported amount of DKK 200,000 (approximately £25,000) in his former club Lyngby and consequently became a minority owner of the club.

== Career statistics ==
Appearances and goals by club, season and competition
Club	Season	League			National cup (Note: Includes Danish Cup, KNVB Cup, FA Cup)		League cup (Note: Includes EFL Cup)		Europe		Other		Total	
Club	Season	Division	Apps	Goals	Apps	Goals	Apps	Goals	Apps	Goals	Apps	Goals	Apps	Goals
Lyngby	2006–07	1st Division	9	0	0	0	—		—		—		9	0
Lyngby	2007–08	Superliga	11	0	0	0	—		—		—		11	0
Lyngby	2008–09	1st Division	22	1	2	0	—		—		—		24	1
Lyngby	2009–10	1st Division	4	0	1	0	—		—		—		5	0
Lyngby	Total		46	1	3	0	—		—		—		47	1
FC Nordsjælland	2009–10	Superliga	22	1	5	0	—		—		—		27	1
FC Nordsjælland	2010–11	Superliga	24	1	5	0	—		0	0	—		29	1
FC Nordsjælland	2011–12	Superliga	26	1	1	0	—		2 (Note: Appearances in Europa League)	0	—		27	1
FC Nordsjælland	Total		72	3	11	0	—		2	0	—		85	3
FC Twente	2012–13	Eredivisie	8	0	0	0	—		4	0	2 (Note: Appearances in Eredivisie European competition play-offs)	0	14	0
FC Twente	2013–14	Eredivisie	33	0	1	0	—		—		—		34	0
FC Twente	2014–15	Eredivisie	26	3	4	0	—		1	0	—		31	3
FC Twente	Total		67	3	5	0	—		5	0	2	0	79	3
Brentford	2015–16	Championship	0	0	0	0	1	0	—		—		1	0
Brentford	2016–17	Championship	28	0	1	0	0	0	—		—		29	0
Brentford	2017–18	Championship	34	1	0	0	1	0	—		—		35	1
Brentford	Total		62	1	1	0	2	0	—		—		65	1
F.C. Copenhagen	2018–19	Superliga	30	1	0	0	—		11	0	—		41	1
F.C. Copenhagen	2019–20	Superliga	21	0	1	0	—		8	0	—		30	0
F.C. Copenhagen	2020–21	Superliga	3	0	0	0	—		1	0	—		4	0
F.C. Copenhagen	Total		54	1	1	0	—		20	0	—		75	1
Lyngby (loan)	2021–22	1st Division	24	1	1	0	—		—		—		25	1
Lyngby	2022–23	Superliga	18	0	0	0	—		—		—		18	0
Lyngby	2023–24	Superliga	25	1	2	0	—		—		—		27	1
Lyngby	2024–25	Superliga	3	0	0	0	—		—		—		3	0
Lyngby	Total		116	3	6	0	—		—		—		122	3
Career totals			362	11	24	0	2	0	27	0	2	0	417	11

== Honours ==
=== Player ===
FC Nordsjælland

- Danish Superliga: 2011–12
- DBU Pokalen: 2009–10, 2010–11

FC Copenhagen

- Danish Superliga: 2018–19

Lyngby

- Danish 1st Division second-place promotion: 2021–22

=== Manager ===
Lyngby

- Danish 1st Division: 2025–26
