= 2016–17 EFL Championship =

EFL Championship
- Season: 2016–17
- Champions: Newcastle United; 2nd Championship title 4th 2nd tier title
- Promoted: Newcastle United; Brighton & Hove Albion; Huddersfield Town
- Relegated: Rotherham United; Wigan Athletic; Blackburn Rovers
- Matches: 552
- Goals: 1,441 (2.61 per match)
- Top goalscorer: Chris Wood (Leeds United) (27 goals)
- Biggest home win: Norwich City 7–1 Reading (8 April 2017)
- Biggest away win: Queens Park Rangers 0–6 Newcastle United (13 September 2016)
- Highest scoring: Wolverhampton Wanderers 4–4 Fulham (10 December 2016); Burton Albion 3–5 Brentford (18 March 2017); Norwich City 7–1 Reading (8 April 2017)
- Longest winning run: 8 matches Newcastle United
- Longest unbeaten run: 18 matches Brighton & Hove Albion
- Longest winless run: 17 matches Rotherham United
- Longest losing run: 10 matches Rotherham United
- Highest attendance: 52,301; Newcastle United 1–1 Leeds United (14 April 2017)
- Lowest attendance: 3,725; Burton Albion 1–1 Queens Park Rangers (27 September 2016)
- Average attendance: 20,125

The 2016–17 EFL Championship (referred to as the Sky Bet Championship for sponsorship reasons) was the first season of the EFL Championship under its current name, and the twenty-fifth season under its current league structure. Newcastle United were crowned the champions and were promoted to Premier League after just one season in the Championship. Brighton & Hove Albion, alongside Huddersfield Town, both achieved Premier League promotions, via the second automatic promotion place and play-off route respectively, Brighton and Huddersfield Town's first ever since the Premier League formed in 1992. The latter became the first club to gain promotion from the Championship with a negative goal difference.

The season started on 5 August 2016 with the final round of regular league fixtures played on 7 May 2017. The fixtures were announced on 22 June 2016.

== Teams ==
A total of 24 teams contested the league, including 18 sides from the 2015–16 season, three relegated from the 2015–16 Premier League and three promoted from the 2015–16 Football League One. The 2016–17 season was the first in which former European Cup winners Aston Villa played football outside of the top flight since the beginning of the Premier League era in 1992.

== Team changes ==
=== To Championship ===
Promoted from League One

- Wigan Athletic
- Burton Albion
- Barnsley

Relegated from Premier League

- Newcastle United
- Norwich City
- Aston Villa

=== From Championship ===
Relegated to League One

- Charlton Athletic
- Milton Keynes Dons
- Bolton Wanderers

Promoted to Premier League

- Burnley
- Middlesbrough
- Hull City

== Stadiums and locations ==
Locations of the 2016–17 Football League Championship teams
Greater London Championship football clubs

Team	Location	Stadium	Capacity
Aston Villa	Birmingham	Villa Park	42,790
Barnsley	Barnsley	Oakwell	23,009
Birmingham City	Birmingham	St Andrew's	30,020
Blackburn Rovers	Blackburn	Ewood Park	31,370
Brentford	London (Brentford)	Griffin Park	12,760
Brighton & Hove Albion	Brighton and Hove	AMEX Stadium	30,280
Bristol City	Bristol	Ashton Gate	27,000
Burton Albion	Burton upon Trent	Pirelli Stadium	6,912 (2,034 seated)
Cardiff City	Cardiff	Cardiff City Stadium	33,300
Derby County	Derby	Pride Park Stadium	33,600
Fulham	London (Fulham)	Craven Cottage	25,680
Huddersfield Town	Huddersfield	John Smith's Stadium	24,500
Ipswich Town	Ipswich	Portman Road	30,300
Leeds United	Leeds	Elland Road	37,900
Newcastle United	Newcastle	St James' Park	52,354
Norwich City	Norwich	Carrow Road	27,220
Nottingham Forest	Nottingham	City Ground	30,576
Preston North End	Preston	Deepdale	23,408
Queens Park Rangers	London (Shepherd's Bush)	Loftus Road	18,360
Reading	Reading	Madejski Stadium	24,200
Rotherham United	Rotherham	New York Stadium	12,021
Sheffield Wednesday	Sheffield	Hillsborough	39,812
Wigan Athletic	Wigan	DW Stadium	25,023
Wolverhampton Wanderers	Wolverhampton	Molineux	31,700

== Personnel and sponsoring ==
Team	Manager^{1}	Captain	Kit manufacturer	Sponsor
Aston Villa	(England) Steve Bruce	(Wales) James Chester	Under Armour	Intuit QuickBooks
Barnsley	(England) Paul Heckingbottom	(England) Marc Roberts (Note: Marc Roberts named as Barnsley first team Captain during a match on Barnsley F.C, official and verified Twitter account on 28 January 2017. Conor Hourihane was Barnsley first team Captain from July 2016 to 26 January 2017, before Hourihane signed for Aston Villa, during the 2016–2017 EFL Championship season.)	Puma	C.K. Beckett
Birmingham City	(England) Harry Redknapp	(England) Michael Morrison	Adidas	888sport
Blackburn Rovers	(England) Tony Mowbray	(England) Jason Lowe	Umbro	Dafabet
Brentford	(England) Dean Smith	(England) Harlee Dean	Adidas	888sport
Brighton & Hove Albion	(Republic of Ireland) Chris Hughton	(Spain) Bruno	Nike	American Express
Bristol City	(England) Lee Johnson	(Australia) Bailey Wright	Bristol Sport	Lancer Scott
Burton Albion	(England) Nigel Clough	(England) John Mousinho	TAG	Tempobet
Cardiff City	(England) Neil Warnock	(England) Sean Morrison	Adidas	Visit Malaysia
Derby County	(England) Gary Rowett	(Republic of Ireland) Richard Keogh	Umbro	JUST EAT
Fulham	(Serbia) Slaviša Jokanović	(England) Scott Parker	Adidas	Visit Florida
Huddersfield Town	(United States) David Wagner	(England) Mark Hudson	Puma	PURE Legal (home), RadianB (away), Cavonia (third)
Ipswich Town	(Republic of Ireland) Mick McCarthy	(England) Luke Chambers	Adidas	Marcus Evans
Leeds United	(England) Garry Monk	(Scotland) Liam Bridcutt	Kappa	32red
Newcastle United	(Spain) Rafael Benítez	(England) Jamaal Lascelles	Puma	Wonga
Norwich City	(Germany) Daniel Farke	(Scotland) Russell Martin	Erreà	Aviva
Nottingham Forest	(England) Mark Warburton	(England) Chris Cohen	Adidas	888sport
Preston North End	(England) Simon Grayson	(England) Tom Clarke	Nike	888sport
Queens Park Rangers	(England) Ian Holloway	(England) Nedum Onuoha	Dryworld	Smarkets
Reading	(Netherlands) Jaap Stam	(Republic of Ireland) Paul McShane	Puma	Carabao
Rotherham United	(England) Paul Warne	(Republic of Ireland) Lee Frecklington	Puma	Hodge Clemco (home), APOGEE (away/third)
Sheffield Wednesday	(Portugal) Carlos Carvalhal	(Netherlands) Glenn Loovens	Sondico	Chansiri
Wigan Athletic	(England) Paul Cook	(England) Stephen Warnock	Kappa	Intersport
Wolverhampton Wanderers	(Scotland) Paul Lambert	(England) Danny Batth	Puma	The Money Shop

- ^{1} According to current revision of List of current Premier League and English Football League managers.

== League table ==
Pos	Team	Pld	W	D	L	GF	GA	GD	Pts	Promotion, qualification or relegation
1	Newcastle United (C, P)	46	29	7	10	85	40	+45	94	Promotion to the Premier League
2	Brighton & Hove Albion (P)	46	28	9	9	74	40	+34	93	Promotion to the Premier League
3	Reading	46	26	7	13	68	64	+4	85	Qualification for the Championship play-offs (Note: Four teams play for one spot and promotion to the Premier League.)
4	Sheffield Wednesday	46	24	9	13	60	45	+15	81	Qualification for the Championship play-offs
5	Huddersfield Town (O, P)	46	25	6	15	56	58	−2	81	Qualification for the Championship play-offs
6	Fulham	46	22	14	10	85	57	+28	80	Qualification for the Championship play-offs
7	Leeds United	46	22	9	15	61	47	+14	75	
8	Norwich City	46	20	10	16	85	69	+16	70	
9	Derby County	46	18	13	15	54	50	+4	67	
10	Brentford	46	18	10	18	75	65	+10	64	
11	Preston North End	46	16	14	16	64	63	+1	62	
12	Cardiff City	46	17	11	18	60	61	−1	62	
13	Aston Villa	46	16	14	16	47	48	−1	62	
14	Barnsley	46	15	13	18	64	67	−3	58	
15	Wolverhampton Wanderers	46	16	10	20	54	58	−4	58	
16	Ipswich Town	46	13	16	17	48	58	−10	55	
17	Bristol City	46	15	9	22	60	66	−6	54	
18	Queens Park Rangers	46	15	8	23	52	66	−14	53	
19	Birmingham City	46	13	14	19	45	64	−19	53	
20	Burton Albion	46	13	13	20	49	63	−14	52	
21	Nottingham Forest	46	14	9	23	62	72	−10	51	
22	Blackburn Rovers (R)	46	12	15	19	53	65	−12	51	Relegation to EFL League One
23	Wigan Athletic (R)	46	10	12	24	40	57	−17	42	Relegation to EFL League One
24	Rotherham United (R)	46	5	8	33	40	98	−58	23	Relegation to EFL League One

Source: English Football League, Soccerway
Rules for classification: 1) Points; 2) Goal difference; 3) Number of goals scored; 4) Points in head-to-head matches; 5) Goal difference in head-to-head matches; 6) Goals scored in head-to-head matches; 7) Play-off.
(C) Champions; (O) Play-off winners; (P) Promoted; (R) Relegated

== Managerial changes ==
Team	Outgoing manager	Manner of departure	Date of vacancy	Position in table	Incoming manager	Date of appointment
Blackburn Rovers	(Scotland) Paul Lambert	Mutual consent	28 April 2016	Pre-season	(Republic of Ireland) Owen Coyle	2 June 2016
Cardiff City	(England) Russell Slade	Promoted to head of football	8 May 2016	Pre-season	(Wales) Paul Trollope	18 May 2016
Nottingham Forest	(England) Paul Williams	Mutual consent	12 May 2016	Pre-season	(France) Philippe Montanier	27 June 2016
Rotherham United	(England) Neil Warnock	End of contract	18 May 2016	Pre-season	(England) Alan Stubbs	1 June 2016
Reading	(England) Brian McDermott	Sacked	27 May 2016	Pre-season	(Netherlands) Jaap Stam	13 June 2016
Derby County	(England) Darren Wassall	End of caretaker spell	27 May 2016	Pre-season	(England) Nigel Pearson	27 May 2016
Leeds United	(Scotland) Steve Evans	Sacked	31 May 2016	Pre-season	(England) Garry Monk	2 June 2016
Aston Villa	(Scotland) Eric Black	End of caretaker spell	2 June 2016	Pre-season	(Italy) Roberto Di Matteo	2 June 2016
Wolverhampton Wanderers	(Wales) Kenny Jackett	Sacked	29 July 2016	Pre-season	(Italy) Walter Zenga	30 July 2016
Aston Villa	(Italy) Roberto Di Matteo	Sacked	3 October 2016	19th	(England) Steve Bruce	12 October 2016
Cardiff City	(Wales) Paul Trollope	Sacked	4 October 2016	23rd	(England) Neil Warnock	5 October 2016
Derby County	(England) Nigel Pearson	Mutual consent	8 October 2016	20th	(England) Steve McClaren	12 October 2016
Rotherham United	(England) Alan Stubbs	Sacked	19 October 2016	24th	(Wales) Kenny Jackett	21 October 2016
Wolverhampton Wanderers	(Italy) Walter Zenga	Sacked	25 October 2016	18th	(Scotland) Paul Lambert	5 November 2016
Wigan Athletic	(Scotland) Gary Caldwell	Sacked	25 October 2016	23rd	(England) Warren Joyce	2 November 2016
Queens Park Rangers	(Netherlands) Jimmy Floyd Hasselbaink	Sacked	5 November 2016	17th	(England) Ian Holloway	11 November 2016
Rotherham United	(Wales) Kenny Jackett	Resigned	16 November 2016	24th	(England) Paul Warne	5 April 2017
Birmingham City	(England) Gary Rowett	Sacked	14 December 2016	7th	(Italy) Gianfranco Zola	14 December 2016
Nottingham Forest	(France) Philippe Montanier	Sacked	14 January 2017	20th	(England) Mark Warburton	14 March 2017
Blackburn Rovers	(Republic of Ireland) Owen Coyle	Sacked	21 February 2017	23rd	(England) Tony Mowbray	22 February 2017
Norwich City	(Scotland) Alex Neil	Sacked	10 March 2017	8th	(Germany) Daniel Farke	25 May 2017
Derby County	(England) Steve McClaren	Sacked	12 March 2017	10th	(England) Gary Rowett	14 March 2017
Wigan Athletic	(England) Warren Joyce	Sacked	13 March 2017	23rd	(England) Paul Cook	31 May 2017
Birmingham City	(Italy) Gianfranco Zola	Resigned	17 April 2017	20th	(England) Harry Redknapp	18 April 2017

== Play-offs ==
Semi-finals
3	Reading	1	1	2
6	Fulham	1	0	1
4	Sheffield Wednesday	0	1	1 (3)
5	Huddersfield Town	0	1	1 (4)

Final
3	Reading	0 (3)
5	Huddersfield Town	0 (4)

The four teams that finished from third to sixth played off, with the winning team, Huddersfield Town, gaining the final promotion spot to the Premier League.

In the play-off semi-finals the third-placed team played the sixth-placed team and the fourth-placed team played the fifth-placed team. The team that finished in the higher league position played away in the first leg and played at home in the second leg. If the aggregate score was level after both legs, then extra time was played. If the scores were still level, a penalty shoot-out decided the winner. The away goals rule does not apply in the playoffs.

The winners from the two semi-finals played at Wembley Stadium in the play-off final. The game is known as the richest game in football as the winning club is guaranteed significantly increased television rights payments estimated to be in the order of £170M.

== Results ==
Home \ Away	AST	BAR	BIR	BLB	BRE	B&HA	BRI	BRT	CAR	DER	FUL	HUD	IPS	LEE	NEW	NWC	NOT	PNE	QPR	REA	ROT	SHW	WIG	WOL
Aston Villa		1–3	1–0	2–1	1–1	1–1	2–0	2–1	3–1	1–0	1–0	1–1	0–1	1–1	1–1	2–0	2–2	2–2	1–0	1–3	3–0	2–0	1–0	1–1
Barnsley	1–1		2–2	2–0	1–1	0–2	2–2	1–1	0–0	2–0	2–4	1–1	1–1	3–2	0–2	2–1	2–5	0–0	3–2	1–2	4–0	1–1	0–0	1–3
Birmingham City	1–1	0–3		1–0	1–3	1–2	1–0	0–2	0–0	1–2	1–0	2–0	2–1	1–3	0–0	3–0	0–0	2–2	1–4	0–1	4–2	2–1	0–1	1–3
Blackburn Rovers	1–0	0–2	1–1		3–2	2–3	1–1	2–2	1–1	1–0	0–1	1–1	0–0	1–2	1–0	1–4	2–1	2–2	1–0	2–3	4–2	0–1	1–0	1–1
Brentford	3–0	0–2	1–2	1–3		3–3	2–0	2–1	2–2	4–0	0–2	0–1	2–0	2–0	1–2	0–0	1–0	5–0	3–1	4–1	4–2	1–1	0–0	1–2
Brighton & Hove Albion	1–1	2–0	3–1	1–0	0–2		0–1	4–1	1–0	3–0	2–1	1–0	1–1	2–0	1–2	5–0	3–0	2–2	3–0	3–0	3–0	2–1	2–1	1–0
Bristol City	3–1	3–2	0–1	1–0	0–1	0–2		0–0	2–3	1–1	0–2	4–0	2–0	1–0	0–1	1–1	2–1	1–2	2–1	2–3	1–0	2–2	2–1	3–1
Burton Albion	1–1	0–0	2–0	1–1	3–5	0–1	1–2		2–0	1–0	0–2	0–1	1–2	2–1	1–2	2–1	1–0	0–1	1–1	2–4	2–1	3–1	0–2	2–1
Cardiff City	1–0	3–4	1–1	2–1	2–1	0–0	2–1	1–0		0–2	2–2	3–2	3–1	0–2	0–2	0–1	1–0	2–0	0–2	0–1	5–0	1–1	0–1	2–1
Derby County	0–0	2–1	1–0	1–2	0–0	0–0	3–3	0–0	3–4		4–2	1–1	0–1	1–0	0–2	1–0	3–0	1–1	1–0	3–2	3–0	2–0	0–0	3–1
Fulham	3–1	2–0	0–1	2–2	1–1	1–2	0–4	1–1	2–2	2–2		5–0	3–1	1–1	1–0	2–2	3–2	3–1	1–2	5–0	2–1	1–1	3–2	1–3
Huddersfield Town	1–0	2–1	1–1	1–1	2–1	3–1	2–1	0–1	0–3	1–0	1–4		2–0	2–1	1–3	3–0	2–1	3–2	2–1	1–0	2–1	0–1	1–2	1–0
Ipswich Town	0–0	4–2	1–1	3–2	1–1	0–0	2–1	2–0	1–1	0–3	0–2	0–1		1–1	3–1	1–1	0–2	1–0	3–0	2–2	2–2	0–1	3–0	0–0
Leeds United	2–0	2–1	1–2	2–1	1–0	2–0	2–1	2–0	0–2	1–0	1–1	0–1	1–0		0–2	3–3	2–0	3–0	0–0	2–0	3–0	1–0	1–1	0–1
Newcastle United	2–0	3–0	4–0	0–1	3–1	2–0	2–2	1–0	2–1	1–0	1–3	1–2	3–0	1–1		4–3	3–1	4–1	2–2	4–1	4–0	0–1	2–1	0–2
Norwich City	1–0	2–0	2–0	2–2	5–0	2–0	1–0	3–1	3–2	3–0	1–3	1–2	1–1	2–3	2–2		5–1	0–1	4–0	7–1	3–1	0–0	2–1	3–1
Nottingham Forest	2–1	0–1	3–1	0–1	2–3	3–0	1–0	4–3	1–2	2–2	1–1	2–0	3–0	3–1	2–1	1–2		1–1	1–1	3–2	2–0	1–2	4–3	0–2
Preston North End	2–0	1–2	2–1	3–2	4–2	2–0	5–0	1–1	3–0	0–1	1–2	3–1	1–1	1–4	1–2	1–3	1–1		2–1	3–0	1–1	1–1	1–0	0–0
Queens Park Rangers	0–1	2–1	1–1	1–1	0–2	1–2	1–0	1–2	2–1	0–1	1–1	1–2	2–1	3–0	0–6	2–1	2–0	0–2		1–1	5–1	1–2	2–1	1–2
Reading	1–2	0–0	0–0	3–1	3–2	2–2	2–1	3–0	2–1	1–1	1–0	1–0	2–1	1–0	0–0	3–1	2–0	1–0	0–1		2–1	2–1	1–0	2–1
Rotherham United	0–2	0–1	1–1	1–1	1–0	0–2	2–2	1–2	1–2	1–1	0–1	2–3	1–0	1–2	0–1	2–1	2–2	1–3	1–0	0–1		0–2	3–2	2–2
Sheffield Wednesday	1–0	2–0	3–0	2–1	1–2	1–2	3–2	1–1	1–0	2–1	1–2	2–0	1–2	0–2	2–1	5–1	2–1	2–1	1–0	0–2	1–0		2–1	0–0
Wigan Athletic	0–2	3–2	1–1	3–0	2–1	0–1	0–1	0–0	0–0	0–1	0–0	0–1	2–3	1–1	0–2	2–2	0–0	0–0	0–1	0–3	3–2	0–1		2–1
Wolverhampton Wanderers	1–0	0–4	1–2	0–0	3–1	0–2	3–2	1–1	3–1	2–3	4–4	0–1	0–0	0–1	0–1	1–2	1–0	1–0	1–2	2–0	1–0	0–2	0–1	

Source: BBC Sport
Legend: Blue = home team win; Yellow = draw; Red = away team win.

== Top scorers ==
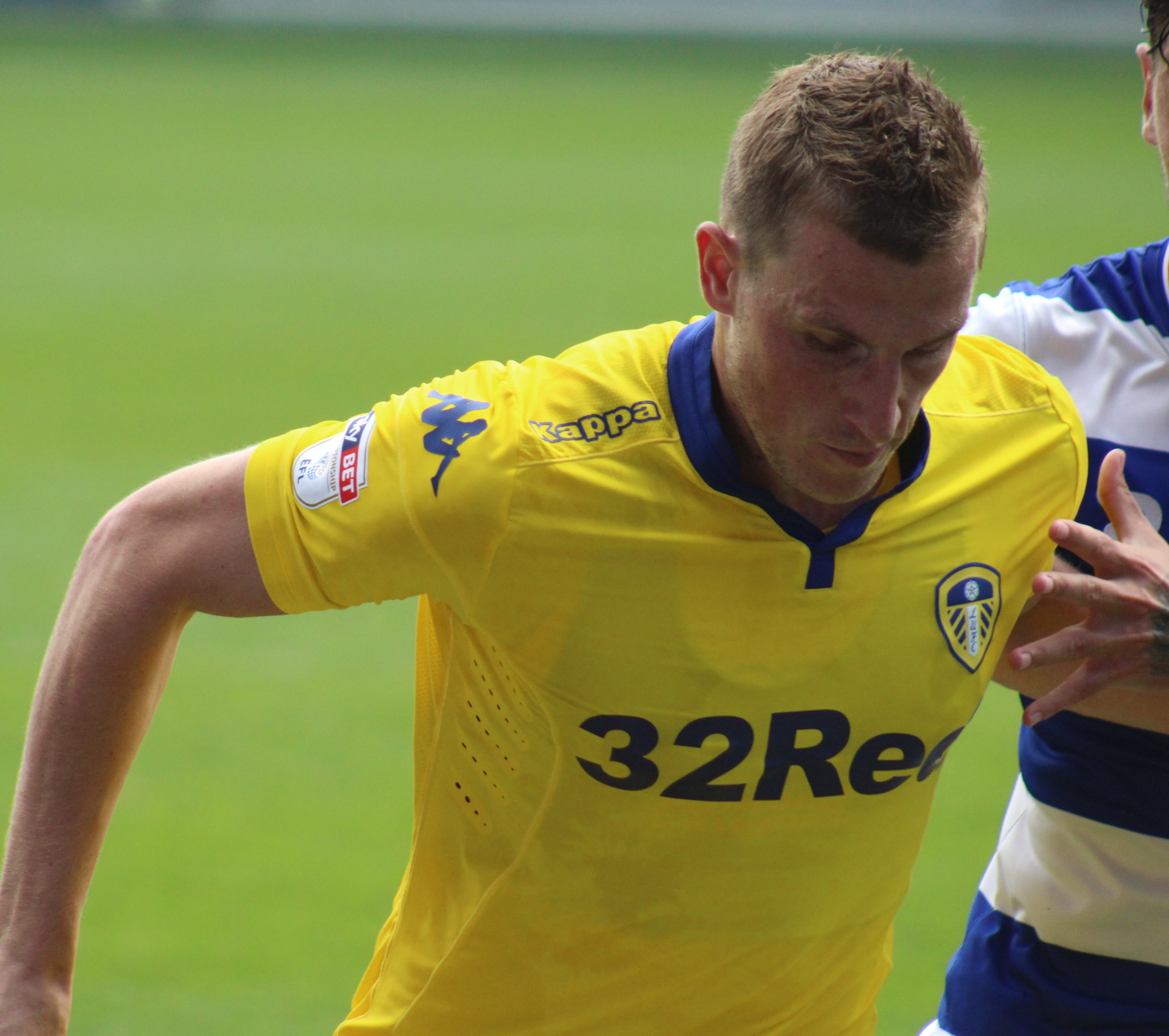
Chris Wood was the top goalscorer of the season with 27 goals for Leeds United.

Rank	Player	Club	Goals
1	(New Zealand) Chris Wood	Leeds United	27
2	(England) Glenn Murray	Brighton & Hove Albion	23
2	(England) Tammy Abraham	Bristol City	23
2	(England) Dwight Gayle	Newcastle United	23
5	(Ivory Coast) Jonathan Kodjia	Aston Villa	19
6	(France) Yann Kermorgant	Reading	18
7	(England) Cameron Jerome	Norwich City	16
8	(France) Anthony Knockaert	Brighton & Hove Albion	15
8	(Denmark) Lasse Vibe	Brentford	15
8	(Republic of Ireland) Scott Hogan	Brentford/Aston Villa (Note: Scott Hogan scored 14 goals for Brentford, before joining Aston Villa in January 2017.)	15

== Hat-tricks ==
Player	For	Against	Result	Date
(England) Grant Ward	Ipswich Town	Barnsley	4–2	6 August 2016
(Republic of Ireland) Scott Hogan	Brentford	Preston North End	5–0	17 September 2016
(England) Dwight Gayle	Newcastle United	Norwich City	4–3	28 September 2016
(England) Glenn Murray	Brighton & Hove Albion	Norwich City	5–0	29 October 2016
(England) Henri Lansbury	Nottingham Forest	Barnsley	5–2	25 November 2016
(England) Dwight Gayle	Newcastle United	Birmingham City	4–0	10 December 2016
(Portugal) Nélson Oliveira	Norwich City	Derby County	3–0	2 January 2017
(Spain) Jota	Brentford	Rotherham United	4–2	25 February 2017
(England) David Nugent	Derby County	Fulham	4–2	4 April 2017
(England) Nick Powell	Wigan Athletic	Barnsley	3–2	13 April 2017

== Monthly awards ==
Month	Manager of the Month		Player of the Month		Reference
Month	Manager	Club	Player	Club	Reference
August	(United States) David Wagner	Huddersfield Town	(Republic of Ireland) Conor Hourihane	Barnsley	
September	(Scotland) Alex Neil	Norwich City	(Republic of Ireland) Scott Hogan	Brentford	
October	(Spain) Rafael Benítez	Newcastle United	(Nigeria) Sone Aluko	Fulham	
November	(England) Steve McClaren	Derby County	(England) Henri Lansbury	Nottingham Forest	
December	(Republic of Ireland) Chris Hughton	Brighton & Hove Albion	(England) Sam Winnall	Barnsley	
January	(Netherlands) Jaap Stam	Reading	(New Zealand) Chris Wood	Leeds United	
February	(United States) David Wagner	Huddersfield Town	(Republic of Ireland) Aiden McGeady	Preston North End	
March	(Scotland) Paul Lambert	Wolverhampton Wanderers	(England) Tom Barkhuizen	Preston North End	
April	(Portugal) Carlos Carvalhal	Sheffield Wednesday	(France) Yann Kermorgant	Reading	

== Attendances ==
Team	Stadium	Capacity	Average	Minimum	Maximum	Percentage Full
Aston Villa	Villa Park	42,788	31,901	26,435	41,337	75%
Barnsley	Oakwell	23,009	13,843	11,613	18,597	60%
Birmingham City	St Andrew's	30,009	18,137	15,212	29,656	60%
Blackburn Rovers	Ewood Park	31,367	11,853	9,976	18,524	38%
Brentford	Griffin Park	12,763	10,288	9,035	12,052	81%
Brighton & Hove Albion	Falmer Stadium	30,750	27,619	24,166	30,230	90%
Bristol City	Ashton Gate	27,000	18,953	16,444	22,512	70%
Burton Albion	Pirelli Stadium	6,912	5,078	3,725	6,746	73%
Cardiff City	Cardiff City Stadium	33,280	16,335	13,894	22,776	49%
Derby County	Pride Park Stadium	33,597	29,104	26,301	32,616	87%
Fulham	Craven Cottage	25,700	18,665	13,735	24,300	73%
Huddersfield Town	John Smith's Stadium	25,554	20,343	18,333	23,213	83%
Ipswich Town	Portman Road	30,311	16,555	14,719	23,350	55%
Leeds United	Elland Road	40,204	26,779	19,009	36,002	67%
Newcastle United	St James' Park	52,389	51,111	47,907	52,231	98%
Norwich City	Carrow Road	27,244	26,272	25,275	27,107	96%
Nottingham Forest	City Ground	30,576	19,207	15,770	23,012	63%
Preston North End	Deepdale	24,408	12,888	9,216	21,255	55%
Queens Park Rangers	Loftus Road	18,360	14,426	11,635	17,404	79%
Reading	Madejski Stadium	24,200	17,280	12,655	23,121	71%
Rotherham United	New York Stadium	12,021	9,786	8,348	11,653	81%
Sheffield Wednesday	Hillsborough	39,814	26,580	24,151	30,549	67%
Wigan Athletic	DW Stadium	25,138	11,540	10,071	15,117	46%
Wolves	Molineux	30,852	21,944	17,156	27,541	71%

Source: Soccerway
