= Scott Hogan =

Ireland international footballer (born 1992)

Personal information
- Full name: Scott Andrew Hogan
- Date of birth: 13 April 1992 (age 34)
- Place of birth: Salford, England
- Height: 5 ft 11 in (1.80 m)
- Positions: Forward; winger

Team information
- Current team: Wigan Athletic
- Number: 25

Youth career
- 2009–2010: Rochdale

Senior career*
Years	Team	Apps	(Gls)
2010	Woodley Sports	27	(21)
2010–2011	FC Halifax Town	15	(0)
2010	→ Woodley Sports (loan)	0	(0)
2011	→ Mossley (loan)	4	(1)
2011–2012	Stocksbridge Park Steels	16	(7)
2012–2013	Ashton United	8	(1)
2013	Hyde	11	(3)
2013–2014	Rochdale	33	(17)
2014–2017	Brentford	33	(21)
2017–2020	Aston Villa	56	(7)
2019	→ Sheffield United (loan)	8	(2)
2019–2020	→ Stoke City (loan)	13	(3)
2020	→ Birmingham City (loan)	17	(7)
2020–2024	Birmingham City	132	(28)
2024–2026	Milton Keynes Dons	54	(9)
2026–	Wigan Athletic	2	(1)

International career
2018–2022	Republic of Ireland	12	(0)
- * Club domestic league appearances and goals as of 19:45, 1 October 2026 (UTC)

Scott Andrew Hogan (born 13 April 1992) is a professional footballer who plays as a forward for EFL League One side Wigan Athletic.

Hogan played in the youth system at Rochdale but was released in 2010. He entered non-league football, playing for Woodley Sports, FC Halifax Town, Mossley, Stocksbridge Park Steels, Ashton United and Hyde before a return to Rochdale. He scored 17 goals in 2013–14 which prompted Brentford to sign him in July 2014 for a fee of £750,000.

He spent two and a half seasons at Griffin Park and moved to Aston Villa in January 2017. After struggling to establish himself at Villa Park he spent time on loan at Sheffield United in 2018–19 and at Stoke City and Birmingham City in 2019–20 before rejoining Birmingham on a permanent contract in September 2020. He was released at the end of the 2023–24 season, before joining then League Two club Milton Keynes Dons, where he remained until he was released in May 2026. Later that year he signed for Wigan Athletic on a short-term contract.

Hogan was born in England, and has 12 senior international caps for the Republic of Ireland, for which he qualifies by descent.

== Club career ==
=== Rochdale ===
Hogan was born in Salford, Greater Manchester. He began his career as a student at Salford College, studying for a BTEC National Diploma in Sport and playing in the college's Football Academy first team, before moving onto the youth academy at League Two club Rochdale in 2009. After just one call into the first team squad, he was released at the end of the 2009–10 season.

=== Woodley Sports ===
Hogan dropped into non-League football to join Northern Premier League First Division North club Woodley Sports during the 2010 off-season. He had a prolific spell with the club, scoring 21 goals in 27 league games. He departed the club in November 2010, but immediately returned on loan for a further month.

=== FC Halifax Town ===
Hogan signed with Northern Premier League Premier Division club FC Halifax Town in November 2010 and linked up with his brother Liam. He made his debut in a West Riding County Cup second round match against Barnoldswick Town on 15 December and scored the second goal in a 5–0 victory. On 10 January 2011, Hogan featured in a 3–0 Northern Premier League Challenge Cup third round win over Bradford Park Avenue, but his inclusion in the team caused Halifax's expulsion from the competition, as he was cup-tied after appearing for Woodley Sports in the competition earlier in the season. Hogan slowly broke into the league squad and the Shaymen finished the 2010–11 season as Northern Premier League Premier Division champions, which promoted the club to the Conference North for the 2011–12 season.

In August 2011, Hogan joined Northern Premier League First Division North club Mossley on loan. He made his debut on the opening day of the 2011–12 season, scoring in a 2–1 defeat to Ossett Townm and made three further appearances before returning to Halifax. Hogan made his first Halifax appearance of the 2011–12 season on 29 August, as a 77th-minute substitute for Lee Gregory in a 0–0 draw with Boston United. He fell out of favour and made a handful of further appearances before leaving The Shay in late December. Hogan made 22 appearances and scored four goals during just over a year with F.C. Halifax.

=== Stocksbridge Park Steels ===
Hogan signed for Northern Premier League Premier Division club Stocksbridge Park Steels in December 2011. He quickly struck up a strike partnership with Jack Muldoon and made regular appearances for the club. Hogan left the Steels in October 2012, after encountering problems commuting to Stocksbridge from his home in Warrington. He made 16 appearances and scored seven goals during the early months of the 2012–13 season.

=== Ashton United ===
In October 2012, Hogan signed for Northern Premier League Premier Division club Ashton United. He scored one goal in eight league appearances for the club, before departing in March 2013.

=== Hyde ===
On 9 March 2013, Hogan signed a non-contract deal with Conference Premier strugglers Hyde and made his debut that day as a second-half substitute for Louis Almond in a 3–0 defeat to Gateshead. He left Hyde at the end of the 2012–13 season having scored three goals from 11 Conference appearances.

=== Return to Rochdale ===
On 9 May 2013, Hogan returned to Rochdale, signing a two-year deal. He made his professional debut on 3 August, scoring the first goal of a 3–0 home win against Hartlepool United with a strike that was named as the Sky Sports News Goal of the Day. He began the season in good form and scored 10 goals in his first 20 league appearances. Four goals in five matches won Hogan the League Two Player of the Month award for February and he celebrated by scoring his second hat-trick in three weeks against Oxford United on 1 March.

Hogan finished the 2013–14 season with 19 goals in 40 appearances to help Rochdale to third place in League Two and automatic promotion to League One. In addition to winning the club's Supporters' Player of the Year award, he was voted into the PFA Football League Two Team of the Year and was shortlisted for the League Two Player of the Year award. He left the club in mid-July.

=== Brentford ===
On 21 July 2014, Hogan signed a three-year contract with Championship club Brentford, for a fee reported to be approximately £750,000. After missing a portion of the 2014–15 pre-season with an ankle injury, he made his Bees debut on 26 August as a second-half substitute for Nick Proschwitz in a 1–0 defeat to West London rivals Fulham in the second round of the League Cup. Hogan made his league debut for Brentford in the following game against Rotherham United, coming on for Jota after 67 minutes, but he suffered an anterior cruciate ligament injury in his left knee on 82 minutes and was immediately substituted. Hogan underwent reconstructive surgery on 10 September and re-injured the same knee in April 2015, after catching his foot in the turf during a passing drill in training. He underwent further surgery on 29 April and later signed a one-year contract extension, which would keep him at Griffin Park until the end of the 2017–18 season.

Hogan finally returned to the pitch with an appearance for the Development Squad against Crystal Palace on 29 February 2016 and he scored the opening goal of the 2–2 draw. After two further appearances, he made his return to the first team with a late substitute appearance in a 1–0 defeat to Blackburn Rovers on 19 March. Though he subsequently suffered from a hamstring problem, Hogan soon returned to the team and finished the season with seven goals from seven games.

Hogan began the 2016–17 season as an ever-present and got off the mark on his fourth appearance, with the only goal of the game versus Nottingham Forest on 16 August 2016. He went on to score 13 goals in an 18-match spell, which included his first Brentford hat-trick (scored in a 5–0 win over Preston North End) and the September 2016 Championship Player of the Month award. Hogan left the club on 31 January 2017 and scored 21 goals in 36 appearances during two and a half seasons at Griffin Park.

=== Aston Villa ===
On 31 January 2017, Hogan joined Championship club Aston Villa on a four-and-a-half-year contract for an undisclosed fee. He scored his first goal for Villa in a 2–0 win over Wigan Athletic on 18 March 2017, which would prove to be the only goal he scored during the 13 appearances he made during the second half of the 2016–17 season. Hogan had an injury and form-affected first half of the 2017–18 season, but featured regularly during the second half of the campaign to finish with 41 appearances and 9 goals. Hogan made seven appearances during the first half of the 2018–19 season, predominantly as a substitute and departed on loan for the rest of the campaign in January 2019. He returned at the end of the regular season, but was not eligible to play in Villa's play-off campaign.

==== Sheffield United (loan) ====
On 31 January 2019, Hogan joined Championship high-flyers Sheffield United on loan until the end of the 2018–19 season. He scored two goals in eight appearances and celebrated promotion to the Premier League with the club at the end of the season.

==== Stoke City (loan) ====
On 7 August 2019, Hogan joined Stoke City on loan for the 2019–20 season. Hogan scored twice in a 2–2 draw against Derby County on 17 August 2019. He scored a late goal against Swansea City on 5 October 2019, giving Stoke their first win of the season. Following a change of managers in November Hogan fell out of favour.

==== Birmingham City (loan) ====
Hogan was recalled from Stoke City by Villa on 29 January 2020 and loaned straight out to another Championship club, city rivals Birmingham City, for what remained of the season. He started the next match, at home to Nottingham Forest, and scored the opening goal in a 2–1 win. He continued to score freely, playing in a 4–4–2 formation in partnership with Lukas Jutkiewicz, and finished his first month with six goals from seven Championship appearances, which included the winner at Barnsley, a late equaliser against Sheffield Wednesday, and both Birmingham's goals in a 2–2 draw away to Queens Park Rangers. His performances earned him the Championship Player of the Month award. By the time football was suspended because of the COVID-19 pandemic, he had seven goals from eight league matches. When it was confirmed that the season would be completed, his loan was extended to cover the remaining fixtures, but he failed to score after the resumption.

=== Birmingham City ===
Hogan rejoined Birmingham City on a four-year permanent contract on 16 September 2020; the fee was undisclosed. He was released at the end of the 2023–24 season.

=== Milton Keynes Dons ===
On 4 October 2024, Hogan joined League Two club Milton Keynes Dons. On 19 October 2024, he scored his first goal for the club in a 3–1 away win over Morecambe.

Amid brief injury issues and competition for places, Hogan mainly featured as a substitute in his second season, making 21 appearances and scoring a single goal during a campaign in which the club achieved a second-placed finish and promotion to League One. He was later named as one of nine players to be released by the club at the conclusion of the 2025–26 season.

=== Wigan Athletic ===
On 12 September 2026, he joined EFL League One side Wigan Athletic on a short-term contract, which will initially last until January 2027.

He made his debut for the Latics later that day in a goalless draw with Sheffield Wednesday at Hillsborough, coming on as a second-half substitute for Sonny Perkins.

== International career ==
Hogan was called up to the Republic of Ireland U21 squad in February 2014, but did not feature in a match. He is eligible to play for Ireland through having two Irish grandparents. Hogan was called up to the senior Republic of Ireland squad for two 2018 FIFA World Cup qualifiers and two subsequent second round matches in October and November 2017 respectively, but was an unused substitute in all four matches. He made his senior debut on 23 March 2018 in a 1–0 friendly defeat to Turkey.

== Personal life ==
Hogan's brother Liam is also a professional footballer and the pair played together at F.C. Halifax Town. Having both studied at Salford College, the brothers returned to take part in the presentations at the 2014 Salford City College Sports Awards.

== Career statistics ==
=== Club ===
As of 22 September 2026

Appearances and goals by club, season and competition
Club	Season	League			FA Cup		League Cup		Other		Total	
Club	Season	Division	Apps	Goals	Apps	Goals	Apps	Goals	Apps	Goals	Apps	Goals
Rochdale	2009–10	League Two	0	0	0	0	0	0	0	0	0	0
Woodley Sports	2010–11	NPL First Division North	27	21			—		—		27	21
FC Halifax Town	2010–11	NPL Premier Division	14	0	—		—		4 (Note: 3 appearances and 2 goals in West Riding County Cup, 1 appearance in NPL Challenge Cup)	2	18	2
FC Halifax Town	2011–12	Conference North	1	0	2	0	—		1 (Note: Appearance in West Riding County Cup)	2	4	2
FC Halifax Town	Total		15	0	2	0	—		5	4	22	4
Woodley Sports (loan)	2010–11	NPL First Division North	0	0	—		—		1	3	1	3
Mossley (loan)	2011–12	NPL First Division North	4	1	0	0	—		—		4	1
Stocksbridge Park Steels	2012–13	NPL Premier Division	16	7	—		—		—		16	7
Ashton United	2012–13	NPL Premier Division	8	1	—		—		—		8	1
Hyde	2012–13	Conference Premier	11	3	—		—		—		11	3
Rochdale	2013–14	League Two	33	17	4	2	1	0	2 (Note: Appearances in Football League Trophy)	0	40	19
Brentford	2014–15	Championship	1	0	0	0	1	0	0	0	2	0
Brentford	2015–16	Championship	7	7	0	0	0	0	—		7	7
Brentford	2016–17	Championship	25	14	1	0	1	0	—		27	14
Brentford	Total		33	21	1	0	2	0	0	0	36	21
Aston Villa	2016–17	Championship	13	1	—		—		—		13	1
Aston Villa	2017–18	Championship	37	6	0	0	3	3	1 (Note: Appearance in Championship play-offs)	0	41	9
Aston Villa	2018–19	Championship	6	0	1	0	0	0	—		7	0
Aston Villa	Total		56	7	1	0	3	3	1	0	61	10
Sheffield United (loan)	2018–19	Championship	8	2	—		—		—		8	2
Stoke City (loan)	2019–20	Championship	13	3	0	0	2	0	—		15	3
Birmingham City (loan)	2019–20	Championship	17	7	1	0	—		—		18	7
Birmingham City	2020–21	Championship	33	7	1	0	0	0	—		34	7
Birmingham City	2021–22	Championship	36	10	1	0	0	0	—		37	10
Birmingham City	2022–23	Championship	37	10	3	0	0	0	—		40	10
Birmingham City	2023–24	Championship	26	1	2	0	1	1	—		29	2
Birmingham City	Total		149	35	8	0	1	1	—		158	36
Milton Keynes Dons	2024–25	League Two	33	8	1	0	—		0	0	34	8
Milton Keynes Dons	2025–26	League Two	21	1	1	0	1	0	0	0	23	1
Milton Keynes Dons	Total		54	9	1	0	1	0	0	0	56	9
Wigan Athletic	2026–27	League One	2	0	0	0	0	0	1	1	3	1
Career total			429	127	18	2	10	4	10	8	467	141

=== International ===
As of match played 27 September 2022

Appearances and goals by national team and year
National team	Year	Apps	Goals
Republic of Ireland	2018	3	0
Republic of Ireland	2019	5	0
Republic of Ireland	2020	0	0
Republic of Ireland	2021	0	0
Republic of Ireland	2022	4	0
Total		12	0

== Honours ==
FC Halifax Town

- Northern Premier League Premier Division: 2010–11

Rochdale

- Football League Two third-place promotion: 2013–14

Sheffield United

- EFL Championship second-place promotion: 2018–19

Milton Keynes Dons

- EFL League Two runner-up: 2025–26

Individual

- PFA Team of the Year: 2013–14 League Two
- Rochdale Supporters' Player of the Year: 2013–14
- Football League Two Player of the Month: February 2014
- EFL Championship Player of the Month: September 2016, February 2020

== See also ==
- List of Republic of Ireland international footballers born outside the Republic of Ireland
