= Raphael Assibey-Mensah =

German footballer

Personal information
- Full name: Raphael Assibey-Mensah
- Date of birth: 31 August 1999 (age 27)
- Place of birth: Leipzig, Germany
- Height: 1.81 m (5 ft 11 in)
- Positions: Left winger; attacking midfielder

Team information
- Current team: Rot-Weiß Erfurt
- Number: 7

Youth career
- Fontana Finthen
- 2008–2016: Mainz 05
- 2016–2018: Brentford

Senior career*
| Years | Team | Apps | (Gls) |
| 2018–2021 | TSV Schott Mainz | 74 | (22) |
| 2018–2019 | TSV Schott Mainz II | 7 | (10) |
| 2021–2022 | SC Freiburg II | 8 | (0) |
| 2022–2023 | FSV Zwickau | 18 | (2) |
| 2023–2024 | TSV Schott Mainz | 15 | (2) |
| 2024–2025 | 1. FC Bocholt | 35 | (11) |
| 2025– | Rot-Weiß Erfurt | 32 | (7) |
- * Club domestic league appearances and goals as of 23 September 2026

Raphael Assibey-Mensah (born 31 August 1999) is a German professional footballer who plays as a left winger for Regionalliga Nordost club Rot-Weiß Erfurt.

Assibey-Mensah is a product of the Mainz 05 academy. Following two seasons as a professional with Brentford B in England, he returned to his native Germany. Since 2018, Assibey-Mensah has played lower-league football for TSV Schott Mainz, SC Freiburg II, FSV Zwickau, 1. FC Bocholt and Rot-Weiß Erfurt.

== Club career ==
=== Youth years ===
A left winger or attacking midfielder, Assibey-Mensah began his career in his native Germany with Fontana Finthen, before entering the Mainz 05 academy. He progressed through the ranks to the club's U17 team and scored three goals in 14 U17 Bundesliga appearances before his release at the end of the 2015–16 season. Assibey-Mensah moved to England to sign his first professional contract to be a part of the B team at Championship club Brentford on 31 August 2016. He made 62 B team appearances and scored six goals before his release at the end of the 2017–18 season.

=== TSV Schott Mainz ===
In mid-September 2018, Assibey-Mensah returned to Germany to join Oberliga Rheinland-Pfalz/Saar club TSV Schott Mainz on a contract running until the end of the 2018–19 season. During a season interrupted with a pulmonary embolism, he finished with 15 appearances and two goals. He scored prolifically for the reserve team, with 10 goals in seven Bezirksliga Rheinhessen appearances. During the club's 2019–20 Oberliga Rheinland-Pfalz/Saar championship-winning season, which was ended prematurely by the COVID-19 pandemic, Assibey-Mensah made 20 appearances and scored eight goals. He was retained for 2020–21 and scored 12 goals in 39 appearances during a Regionalliga Südwest season in which the club narrowly avoided relegation. Assibey-Mensah departed TSV Schott Mainz at the end of the campaign and made 76 appearances and scored 23 goals during his three-season spell with the club.

=== SC Freiburg II ===
In May 2021, Assibey-Mensah agreed to transfer to newly-promoted 3. Liga club SC Freiburg II, on a contract effective 1 July 2021, for a €100,000 fee. During an illness-affected 2021–22 season, he made eight appearances without scoring. In June 2022, Assibey-Mensah joined Swiss Challenge League club FC Schaffhausen on trial, but did not win a contract. Assibey-Mensah departed the club on the penultimate day of the summer transfer window.

=== FSV Zwickau ===
On 31 August 2022, Assibey-Mensah transferred to 3. Liga club FSV Zwickau and signed a one-year contract, with a one-year option. He made 20 appearances and scored three goals during a 2022–23 season which culminated in the club's relegation to the Regionalliga Nordost. Assibey-Mensah was released when the club neglected to take up the option on his contract.

=== Return to TSV Schott Mainz ===
Assibey-Mensah spent time during the 2023 off-season training with the VDV and former club TSV Schott Mainz. Following a failed trial with Regionalliga Südwest club Kickers Offenbach, Assibey-Mensah signed a contract with TSV Schott Mainz on 8 September 2023. After four goals in 15 appearances, he departed the club during the 2023–24 winter break.

=== 1. FC Bocholt ===
On 5 January 2024, Assibey-Mensah transferred to Regionalliga West club 1. FC Bocholt. He made seven appearances and scored one goal during what remained of the 2023–24 season, prior to being frozen out of the squad in April 2024. Assibey-Mensah played a full part in the 2024–25 season, scoring 11 goals in 30 appearances prior to undergoing surgery on a season-ending adductor injury in May 2025. He transferred out of the club in June 2025.

=== Rot-Weiß Erfurt ===
On 21 June 2025, Assibey-Mensah signed a two-year contract with Regionalliga Nordost club Rot-Weiß Erfurt. He made 26 appearances and scored four goals during the 2025–26 season.

== International career ==
Assibey-Mensah was named as a standby for a Germany U16 training camp in Barsinghausen in May 2015.

== Personal life ==
Assibey-Mensah is of Ghanaian descent.

== Career statistics ==
As of match played 24 July 2026

Appearances and goals by club, season and competition
| Club | Season | League | | | Other | | Total | |
| Club | Season | Division | Apps | Goals | Apps | Goals | Apps | Goals |
|---|---|---|---|---|---|---|---|---|
| TSV Schott Mainz | 2018–19 | Oberliga Rheinland-Pfalz/Saar | 15 | 2 | 0 | 0 | 15 | 2 |
| TSV Schott Mainz | 2019–20 | Oberliga Rheinland-Pfalz/Saar | 20 | 8 | 1 (Note: Appearance(s) in Southwestern Cup) | 0 | 21 | 8 |
| TSV Schott Mainz | 2020–21 | Regionalliga Südwest | 39 | 12 | 1 | 1 | 40 | 13 |
| TSV Schott Mainz | Total | | 74 | 22 | 2 | 1 | 76 | 23 |
| TSV Schott Mainz II | 2018–19 | Bezirksliga Rheinhessen | 7 | 10 | — | | 7 | 10 |
| SC Freiburg II | 2021–22 | 3. Liga | 8 | 0 | — | | 8 | 0 |
| FSV Zwickau | 2022–23 | 3. Liga | 18 | 2 | 2 (Note: Appearances in Saxony Cup) | 1 | 20 | 3 |
| TSV Schott Mainz | 2023–24 | Regionalliga Südwest | 15 | 2 | 1 | 2 | 15 | 4 |
| 1. FC Bocholt | 2023–24 | Regionalliga West | 7 | 1 | — | | 7 | 1 |
| 1. FC Bocholt | 2024–25 | Regionalliga West | 28 | 10 | 2 (Note: Appearances in Lower Rhine Cup) | 1 | 30 | 11 |
| 1. FC Bocholt | Total | | 35 | 11 | 2 | 1 | 37 | 12 |
| Rot-Weiß Erfurt | 2025–26 | Regionalliga Nordost | 23 | 3 | 3 (Note: Appearances in Thuringian Cup) | 1 | 26 | 4 |
| Rot-Weiß Erfurt | 2026–27 | Regionalliga Nordost | 1 | 0 | 0 | 0 | 1 | 0 |
| Rot-Weiß Erfurt | Total | | 24 | 3 | 3 | 1 | 27 | 4 |
| Career total | | | 181 | 50 | 10 | 6 | 191 | 56 |

== Honours ==
TSV Schott Mainz

- Oberliga Rheinland-Pfalz/Saar: 2019–20
