= Bartek Sylwestrzak =

Polish football manager

Bartek Sylwestrzak is a Polish football manager.

== Early life ==
As a child, Sylwestrzak was a competitive ballroom dancer as a child for a few years.

== Playing career ==
As a footballer, Sylwestrzak played in the youth academy of Granica Bogatynia, joining at the age of fourteen.

== College career ==
Sylwestrzak graduated from English university Loughborough University with a degree in Sport and Exercise Science and later obtained a master's degree in Sport and Exercise Psychology.

== Managerial career ==
Besides English clubs and Danish clubs, Sylwestrzak has worked with Belgian side AA Gent as well as with individual professional footballers all over Europe. He worked with English side Brentford for four seasons. Before becoming Brentford's ball-striking coach, he worked as a youth manager for the club.

He has also worked at Danish side Midtjylland, where he worked with players from under-14 level to the senior first team, and analyzed how each player struck the ball in order to make create training plans for them.
