= Harlee Dean =

English footballer (born 1991)

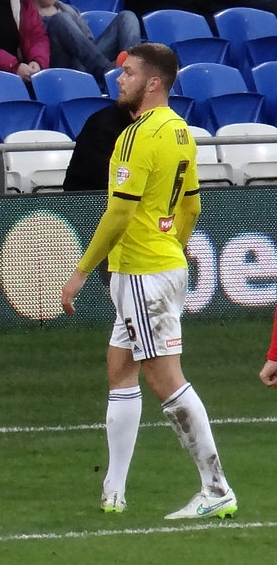
- Dean playing for Brentford in 2014

Personal information
- Full name: Harlee James Dean
- Date of birth: 26 July 1991 (age 35)
- Place of birth: Basingstoke, Hampshire, England
- Height: 6 ft 3 in (1.91 m)
- Position: Centre back

Team information
- Current team: Morecambe
- Number: 5

Youth career
- 20??–2008: Dagenham & Redbridge

Senior career*
Years	Team	Apps	(Gls)
2008–2010	Dagenham & Redbridge	1	(0)
2008	→ Redbridge (loan)	15	(4)
2008–2009	→ Bishop's Stortford (loan)	13	(3)
2009	→ Thurrock (loan)	10	(0)
2009	→ Braintree Town (loan)	8	(0)
2009–2010	→ Grays Athletic (loan)	23	(1)
2010–2012	Southampton	0	(0)
2011	→ Bishop's Stortford (loan)	9	(1)
2011–2012	→ Brentford (loan)	26	(1)
2012–2017	Brentford	198	(7)
2017–2023	Birmingham City	191	(8)
2022	→ Sheffield Wednesday (loan)	7	(0)
2023–2025	Reading	30	(0)
2026–	Morecambe	18	(0)
- * Club domestic league appearances and goals as of 13:53, 24 January 2026 (UTC)

Harlee James Dean (born 26 July 1991) is an English professional footballer who plays as a centre-back for National League North club Morecambe.

He began his career at Dagenham & Redbridge, and had a number of spells on loan at non-League clubs in the Essex and Hertfordshire area, before moving to Southampton in 2010. He joined Brentford on a permanent transfer in 2012, and spent five seasons with the club before signing for Birmingham City. He spent the second half of the 2021–22 season on loan at Sheffield Wednesday, and was released by Birmingham at the end of the following season.

== Career ==
=== Dagenham & Redbridge ===
A centre back, Dean captained the Hall Mead School team for five years and forwent his A-levels in order to join the youth team at Dagenham & Redbridge. Dean received his maiden call into the first team for a League Two match against Morecambe on 7 March 2009, but remained an unused substitute during the 2–0 defeat. After being called into five early 2009–10 season squads without making an appearance, Dean made his professional debut on 31 October 2009, coming on as an 81st-minute substitute for Scott Doe in a 1–1 home league draw with Port Vale and setting up Josh Scott for the equaliser. It proved to be the only appearance of Dean's Dagenham career and he departed the club on 27 August 2010.

==== Redbridge (loan) ====
Early in the 2008–09 season, Dean had a three-month loan spell at Isthmian League Division One North club Redbridge, where he made 15 appearances and scored four goals. Two of the goals came in a 6–1 thrashing of Witham Town on 9 September 2008.

==== Bishop's Stortford (loan) ====
Dean joined Conference South side Bishop's Stortford on loan, which was later extended in January 2009. He made 13 appearances and scored three goals during his spell.

==== Thurrock (loan) ====
Dean signed for Conference South strugglers Thurrock on loan on 20 March 2009. He made 10 appearances.

==== Braintree Town (loan) ====
Dean joined Conference South side Braintree Town on loan in August 2009. He made eight appearances for the club.

==== Grays Athletic (loan) ====
Dean signed on loan for Conference Premier side Grays Athletic in November 2009, a deal which was later extended until the end of the 2009–10 season. Dean made 24 appearances and scored one goal during his time with the club.

=== Southampton ===
Dean signed for League One club Southampton on a two-year contract on 27 August 2010. Dean's only first team call-up during the 2010–11 season was as an unused substitute for a 2–0 defeat to Brentford on 11 December 2010. After the Saints' promotion to the Championship, Dean's only involvement with the first team during the 2011–12 season was as an unused substitute for League Cup matches against Swindon Town and Crystal Palace early in the campaign. He was released by the club at the end of the season, having failed to make an appearance.

==== Return to Bishop's Stortford (loan) ====
Along with Tony Garrod, Dean returned to Bishop's Stortford on a one-month loan in February 2011. On 31 March, manager Ian Walker extended Dean's loan until the end of the 2010–11 season. He made 10 appearances during his spell and scored a consolation goal in a 3–1 defeat to Weston-super-Mare on 19 February.

=== Brentford ===
==== 2011–2013 ====
On 24 November 2011, Dean joined League One club Brentford on loan until 8 January 2012. He made his debut two days later in a 2–1 win at Rochdale, coming on as a late substitute for match-winner and former Dagenham & Redbridge teammate Sam Saunders. Dean made his first start for the club in the following game, partnering Leon Legge in defence in a 1–0 FA Cup second round defeat. On 5 January 2012, Dean's loan was extended until the end of the season. By the end of January, Dean was consistently one of manager Uwe Rösler's first-choice centre backs and scored the first professional goal of his career with the opener in a 4–0 defeat of Carlisle United on 20 February. Dean made 28 appearances during the 2011–12 season and scored once.

On 21 May 2012, Dean signed a two-year permanent deal with the club. Dean got his 2012–13 season off to a good start, scoring on his third appearance in a 5–1 rout of Crewe Alexandra on 25 August 2012. He scored his second goal of the season in a 3–1 away victory over Colchester United on Boxing Day, and his third goal came in a 2–1 loss to Tranmere Rovers on 19 January 2013, making amends after bringing down David Amoo to concede a penalty for Tranmere's opening goal. He started in the FA Cup fourth round against Premier League club Chelsea, with a 2–2 draw at Griffin Park taking the Bees to a replay at Stamford Bridge, which was lost 4–0. A third-place finish in the league and success against Swindon Town in the playoffs saw Brentford face Yeovil Town in the 2013 League One play-off final at Wembley Stadium. After going 2–0 behind, Dean powered home a header in the 51st minute, but wave after wave of subsequent attacks proved fruitless and it was the Glovers who were promoted to the Championship. Dean amassed 56 appearances during the 2012–13 season, scored four goals and shared the club's Players' Player of the Year award with Simon Moore. He signed a three-year contract extension in July 2013.

==== 2013–2015 ====
Dean began the 2013–14 season as an ever-present in league matches and made his 100th Brentford appearance in a 5–0 thrashing of Crewe Alexandra on 16 November 2013. Dean suffered the first injury of his Bees career in the Christmas period, picking up a knock which saw him miss four games in January. A broken metatarsal and an abdominal strain saw Dean miss three games in March, which allowed new centre back signing James Tarkowski to break into the team. A suspension for Tarkowski mid-March saw Dean return to the starting lineup, but his season ended on 28 April, when he underwent an operation to fix his abdominal injury. He made 33 appearances during a successful season for the Bees, which saw the club automatically promoted to the Championship after a runners-up finish.

Though Dean began the 2014–15 season fully fit, he had fallen behind Tarkowski and Tony Craig in the central defensive pecking order. He made his first start of the season in the League Cup first round match against his former club Dagenham & Redbridge on 12 August and converted a header to level the score at 6–6 deep in extra time, sending the game to a penalty shootout, which Brentford won. Dean enjoyed a run in the team in late August and throughout September, but was dropped after losses by three and four goals to Norwich City and Middlesbrough respectively. Dean later told the Hounslow Chronicle that he felt he had been made the scapegoat for the defeats; manager Mark Warburton suggested that his players should keep their frustrations private. He broke back into the team in late October and went on to keep hold of his starting place for much of the season alongside Tarkowski. His second goal of the season came in a 2–1 victory over Fulham on 21 November, which was the first league meeting between the sides since 1998. Dean finished the 2014–15 season with 40 appearances and two goals, after the Bees were knocked out in the playoff semi-finals by Middlesbrough.

==== 2015–2017 ====
After starting in Brentford's first two league matches of the 2015–16 season, it was announced that Dean had been named vice-captain by new manager Marinus Dijkhuizen. He was an ever-present in league matches until being suspended as a result of being shown the first red card of his career during the second half of a 2–1 victory over Nottingham Forest on 21 November 2015. Coming into the final months of his contract, Dean signed a two-year extension in February 2016. He missed just four league matches during the 2015–16 season and in the absence of Jake Bidwell, captained the team during a 3–0 win over local rivals Fulham on 30 April.

Dean was named by head coach Dean Smith as captain for the 2016–17 season. He partnered John Egan or Andreas Bjelland as part of a two- or three-man central defence throughout the first half of the season and scored his first goal since November 2014 with Brentford's second in a 5–0 victory over Preston North End on 17 September. He scored twice in February 2017, in a 3–3 draw with Reading early in the month and what proved to be the winner against Sheffield Wednesday on 22 February. Dean finished the season with 45 appearances and three goals and won the club's Supporters' Player of the Year award.

Entering the final year of his contract, Dean began the 2017–18 season out of favour with Smith, and was stripped of the captaincy due to his reluctance to sign a new deal.

=== Birmingham City ===
On 30 August 2017, Dean signed a three-year contract with another Championship club, Birmingham City, for an undisclosed fee believed to be in the region of £2 million. He was one of six debutants in the next fixture, away to Norwich City; he played the whole match, was yellow-carded in the first half, and was the Birmingham Mail's man of the match as his team lost 1–0.

In July 2019 he signed a new four-year contract with Birmingham.

Dean was voted Birmingham's Supporters' Player of the Year and Players' Player of the Year for the 2020–21 season.

Dean made his 200th and last appearance for Birmingham on the last day of the 2022–23 season. He was one of six senior professionals released at the end of that season.

==== Sheffield Wednesday (loan) ====
Dean joined League One club Sheffield Wednesday on 26 January 2022 on loan for the remainder of the season. He made his debut on 29 January, playing the whole of a 1–0 win against Ipswich Town, but left the field injured just seven minutes into the next match. He finished the loan spell with seven league appearances and two in Wednesday's unsuccessful play-off semi-final.

=== Reading ===
On 4 August 2023, Dean joined League One club Reading, signing a 2-year contract. On 16 May 2025, Reading announced that Dean would leave the club when his contract expired on 30 June 2025.

=== Morecambe ===
On 20 January 2026, Dean joined National League club Morecambe. On 16 May 2026, Morecambe announced he was being released.

== Personal life ==
Dean lives in Brentford and has two children. He is a West Ham United supporter. While chatting to fans outside Griffin Park after a match on 21 November 2015, Dean witnessed a young supporter being hit by a car and ran back into the ground, where he found club doctor Matt Stride. The pair returned to the scene and Stride took charge of the situation until an ambulance arrived. For their actions, Dean and Stride shared the Football League's Unsung Hero of the Month award.

== Career statistics ==
As of match played 11 March 2025

Appearances and goals by club, season and competition
Club	Season	League			FA Cup		League Cup		Other		Total	
Club	Season	Division	Apps	Goals	Apps	Goals	Apps	Goals	Apps	Goals	Apps	Goals
Dagenham & Redbridge	2008–09	League Two	0	0	0	0	0	0	—		0	0
Dagenham & Redbridge	2009–10	League Two	1	0	0	0	0	0	0	0	1	0
Dagenham & Redbridge	Total		1	0	0	0	0	0	0	0	1	0
Redbridge (loan)	2008–09	Isthmian League Division One North	15	4	—		—		—		15	4
Bishop's Stortford (loan)	2008–09	Conference South	13	3	—		—		—		13	3
Thurrock (loan)	2008–09	Conference South	10	0	—		—		—		10	0
Braintree Town (loan)	2009–10	Conference South	8	0	—		—		—		8	0
Grays Athletic (loan)	2009–10	Conference Premier	23	1	—		—		1 (Note: Appearance(s) in FA Trophy)	0	24	1
Southampton	2010–11	League One	0	0	0	0	0	0	0	0	0	0
Southampton	2011–12	Championship	0	0	—		0	0	—		0	0
Southampton	Total		0	0	0	0	0	0	0	0	0	0
Bishop's Stortford (loan)	2010–11	Conference South	9	1	—		—		1 (Note: Appearance(s) in Herts Charity Cup)	0	10	1
Brentford (loan)	2011–12	League One	26	1	1	0	—		1 (Note: Appearance(s) in Football League Trophy)	0	28	1
Brentford	2012–13	League One	44	3	6	0	1	0	5 (Note: Two appearances in Football League Trophy, three appearances and one goal in League One play-offs)	1	56	4
Brentford	2013–14	League One	32	0	1	0	0	0	0	0	33	0
Brentford	2014–15	Championship	35	1	1	0	2	1	2 (Note: Appearances in Championship play-offs)	0	40	2
Brentford	2015–16	Championship	42	0	1	0	0	0	—		43	0
Brentford	2016–17	Championship	42	3	2	0	1	0	—		45	3
Brentford	2017–18	Championship	3	0	—		1	0	—		4	0
Brentford	Total		224	8	12	0	5	1	8	1	249	10
Birmingham City	2017–18	Championship	34	1	3	0	—		—		37	1
Birmingham City	2018–19	Championship	44	1	1	0	0	0	—		45	1
Birmingham City	2019–20	Championship	39	1	4	1	0	0	—		43	2
Birmingham City	2020–21	Championship	43	4	0	0	1	0	—		44	4
Birmingham City	2021–22	Championship	15	0	0	0	0	0	—		15	0
Birmingham City	2022–23	Championship	16	1	0	0	0	0	—		16	1
Birmingham City	Total		191	8	8	1	1	0	—		200	9
Sheffield Wednesday (loan)	2021–22	League One	7	0	—		—		2 (Note: Appearances in League One play-offs)	0	9	0
Reading	2023–24	League One	11	0	1	0	1	0	3 (Note: Appearances in EFL Trophy)	1	16	1
Reading	2024–25	League One	19	0	2	0	1	0	2	0	24	0
Reading	Total		30	0	3	0	2	0	5	1	40	1
Morecambe	2025–26	National League	1	0	0	0	—		0	0	1	0
Career total			532	25	23	1	8	1	17	2	580	29

== Honours ==
Brentford

- Football League One runner-up: 2013–14

Individual

- Brentford Supporters' Player of the Year: 2016–17
- Brentford Players' Player of the Year: 2012–13 (shared with Simon Moore)
- The Football League Unsung Hero of the Month: November 2015 (shared with Matt Stride)
- Birmingham City Supporters' Player of the Year: 2020–21
- Birmingham City Players' Player of the Year: 2020–21
