= Rasmussen =

The surname Rasmussen (Danish pronunciation: [ˈʁɑsmusn̩]) is a Danish surname, meaning Rasmus' son. It is the ninth-most-common surname in Denmark, shared by about 1.9% of the population.

People with this name include:

== Arts and language ==
- Rasmussen (born 1985), Danish singer
- Aaron Frederick Rasmussen Jr. (1915–1984), American microbiologist and immunologist
- Alis Rasmussen (born 1958), American writer known by the name Kate Elliott
- Anne Rasmussen (educator) (born 1959), American ethnomusicologist
- Bill Rasmussen (1932–2026), American media figure, first president and CEO of ESPN
- Bruce Rasmussen (born 1961), American television producer
- Carmen Rasmusen (born 1985), Canadian-American singer
- Christina Rasmussen (born 1972), Greek–American crisis intervention counselor and author
- Egil Rasmussen (1903–1964), Norwegian author, literature critic and musician
- Eiler Rasmussen Eilersen (1827–1912), Danish landscape artist
- Ejnar Mindedal Rasmussen (1892–1975), Danish architect
- Eric Rasmussen (academic) (born 1960), American authority on Shakespearean texts
- Flemming Rasmussen (born 1958), Danish music producer
- Halfdan Rasmussen (1915–2002), Danish poet
- Jens Elmegård Rasmussen (1944–2013), Danish associate professor of Indo-European Studies
- Joel Rasmussen (born 1970), American film producer
- Karen-Lisbeth Rasmussen (born 1944), Danish ceramist and designer
- Karl Aage Rasmussen (born 1947), Danish composer, writer and organizer
- Mary Helen Rasmussen (1930–2008), American musicologist
- Nicolas Rasmussen (born 1962), French-born professor of history at the University of New South Wales
- Rie Rasmussen, (born 1978) Danish actress, model, director and photographer
- Scott Rasmussen (born 1956), American media figure with ESPN and polling company Rasmussen Reports
- Sigrid Horne-Rasmussen (1915–1982), Danish stage and film actress
- Steen Eiler Rasmussen (1898–1990), Danish architect and town-planner
- Rasmus Rasmussen (1862–1932), Norwegian actor and theatre director
- Rasmus Rasmussen (1871–1962), Faroese writer
- Sunleif Rasmussen (born 1961), Faroese composer of classical music

== Military ==
- Phil Rasmussen (1918–2005), American military pilot stationed at Pearl Harbor during the 1941 Japanese attack
- Robert L. Rasmussen (born 1930), American military artist, former naval aviator
- Stefan G. Rasmussen (born 1947), Danish military and civilian pilot, known for SAS flight 751 crash-landing

== Politics and administration ==
- Amund Rasmussen Skarholt (1892–1956), Norwegian politician for the Labour Party
- Anne Rasmussen (politician) (born 1971) Danish politician
- Anders Fogh Rasmussen (born 1953), NATO General Secretary, former Prime Minister of Denmark
- Bergur Løkke Rasmussen (born 1990), Danish politician
- Dan Rasmussen (born 1947), American politician, member of the Iowa House of Representatives
- David Rasmussen Hansen (born 1938), United States federal judge
- Dennis F. Rasmussen (born 1947), American politician
- Einar Normann Rasmussen (1907–1975), Norwegian politician for the Liberal Party
- Hjalte Rasmussen (1940–2012), Professor of European Union Law at the University of Copenhagen
- Holger Rasmusen (1894–1983), American politician
- Kapp Rasmussen (1860–1927), American politician
- Lars Løkke Rasmussen (born 1964), former Prime Minister of Denmark, representing the Liberal Party Venstre
- Olav Rasmussen Langeland (1904–1981), Norwegian politician for the Centre Party
- Poul Nyrup Rasmussen (born 1943), MEP and President of the Party of European Socialists (PES), former Prime Minister of Denmark
- Søren Egge Rasmussen (born 1961), Danish politician for the Red-Green Alliance
- Stu Rasmussen (1948–2021), American politician from the state of Oregon
- Tom Rasmussen (contemporary), former member of the Seattle City Council
- Vicky Holst Rasmussen (born 1977), Danish politician
- Wilkie Rasmussen (born 1958), Deputy Prime Minister of the Cook Islands

== Science, engineering, and technology ==
- Angela Rasmussen, American virologist
- David Tab Rasmussen (1958–2014), American biological anthropologist
- Erik N. Rasmussen (born 1957), American meteorologist and tornado researcher
- Greg Rasmussen (born 1955), British wildlife conservation biologist
- Hanne N. Rasmussen (born 1950), Danish orchid-fungal symbioses scientist
- Jens B. Rasmussen (1947–2005), Danish herpetologist
- Jens Eilstrup Rasmussen (born 1966), Danish software engineer
- Jens Rasmussen (human factors expert) (1926–2018), Danish system safety and human factors professor
- Jørgen Skafte Rasmussen (1878–1964), Danish engineer and industrialist
- Kathleen Rasmussen, American nutritionist
- Knud Rasmussen (1879–1933), Greenlandic polar explorer and anthropologist
- Lars Rasmussen (software developer), creator of Google Maps and Google Wave
- Norman Rasmussen (1927–2003), American physicist
- Pamela C. Rasmussen (born 1959), American ornithologist and expert on Asian birds
- Sonja A. Rasmussen, American pediatrician, medical geneticist, and epidemiologist
- Steen Rasmussen (physicist) (born 1955), Danish artificial life scientist working in the United States
- Steven Rasmussen, American psychiatrist

== Sports ==
- Aage Rasmussen (1889–1983), Danish photographer and track and field athlete
- Alex Rasmussen (born 1984), Danish professional racing cyclist
- Allan Stig Rasmussen (born 1983), Danish chess grandmaster
- Anders Rasmussen (born 1976), Danish professional football player
- Andreas Rasmussen (1893–1967), Danish field hockey player
- Ann-Helen Rasmussen (born 1990) Samoan New Zealand netball player
- Bjørn Rasmussen (1885–1962), Danish football (soccer) player
- Blair Rasmussen (born 1962), American former professional basketball player
- Bruce Rasmussen (basketball) (born 1950), American director of athletics at Creighton University
- Camille Rasmussen (born 2004), Danish gymnast
- Dale Rasmussen (born 1977), Samoan international rugby union player
- David Rasmussen (born 1976), Danish retired football player
- Dawn Rasmussen, retired athlete and sports administrator from Samoa
- Dennis Rasmussen (born 1959), American Major League Baseball pitcher
- Dorthe Rasmussen (born 1960), Danish long-distance runner
- Drew Rasmussen (born 1995), American baseball player
- Einar Rasmussen (born 1956), Norwegian sprint canoeist
- Eldon Rasmussen (1936–2022), Canadian driver in the USAC Championship Car series
- Elton Rasmussen (1937–1978), Australian rugby league player
- Eric Rasmussen (baseball) (born 1952), American retired professional baseball player
- Erik Rasmussen (ice hockey) (born 1977), American professional ice hockey player
- Erik Rasmussen (footballer) (born 1960), Danish former football player and manager
- Erik Rasmussen (handballer) (born 1959), Danish former handball player
- Federico Rasmussen (born 1992), Argentine footballer
- Flint Rasmussen (born 1968), American rodeo clown in the sport of bull riding
- Flemming Rasmussen (strongman) (born 1968), Danish former strongman
- Grace Rasmussen (born 1988), New Zealand netball player
- Hans Kjeld Rasmussen (1954–2025), Danish sports shooter and Olympic champion
- Hans Rasmussen (baseball) (1895–1949), American baseball pitcher
- Hedevig Rasmussen (1902–1985), Danish freestyle swimmer who competed in the 1924 Summer Olympics
- Jacob Rasmussen (born 1997), Danish footballer
- Jens Rasmussen (speedway rider) (born 1959), former speedway rider who rode in the United Kingdom
- Johanna Rasmussen (born 1983), Danish female football striker
- John Boye Rasmussen (born 1982), Danish handball player
- Jonas Rasmussen (born 1977), Danish badminton player
- Jørgen Rasmussen (footballer, born 1945), Danish footballer (defender)
- Jørgen Rasmussen (footballer born 1937), Danish footballer (attacker)
- Juliane Rasmussen (born 1979), Danish rower
- Jørgen Frank Rasmussen (1930–2009), Danish cyclist
- Karen Maud Rasmussen (1906–1994), Danish freestyle swimmer
- Karl Johan Rasmussen (born 1973), Norwegian long-distance runner who specialized in marathon races
- Kemp Rasmussen (born 1979), American football defensive lineman in the NFL
- Kristen Rasmussen (born 1978), American former professional basketball player in the WNBA
- Kyle Rasmussen (born 1968), American former alpine ski racer
- Lars Rasmussen (handball player) (born 1976), Danish team handball player
- Mads Rasmussen (born 1981), Danish rower and double World Champion in the Lightweight Double Sculls
- Marie Rasmussen (born 1972), Danish pole vaulter
- Mark Rasmussen (born 1983), English striker
- Michael Rasmussen (born 1974), Danish cyclist
- Michael Rasmussen (ice hockey) (born 1999), Canadian professional hockey player
- Morten Rasmussen (football defender) (born 1985), Danish professional football player
- Morten Rasmussen (football striker) (born 1985), Danish professional football player
- Ole Rasmussen (footballer born 1952), Danish former football player with German club Hertha BSC
- Ole Rasmussen (footballer born 1960), Danish football manager and former player
- Peter Rasmussen (badminton) (born 1974), Danish badminton player
- Peter Rasmussen (footballer, born 1967), Danish international football (soccer) player
- Peter Rasmussen (footballer, born 1969), Danish football player for AB
- Peter Rasmussen (referee) (born 1975), Danish football referee
- Peter "dupreeh" Rasmussen (born 1993), Danish professional CS:GO player
- Philip Rasmussen (born 1989), Danish professional football midfielder
- Rachel Rasmussen (born 1984), New Zealand netball player
- Randy Rasmussen, American football guard for fifteen seasons for the New York Jets
- Rasmus Rasmussen (1899–1974), Danish gymnast who competed in the 1920 Summer Olympics
- Steffen Rasmussen (born 1982), Danish professional football goalkeeper
- Theis F. Rasmussen (born 1984), Danish football goalkeeper
- Thomas Rasmussen (born 1977), Danish professional football (soccer) player
- Tine Rasmussen (born 1979), female badminton player from Denmark
- Troels Rasmussen (born 1961), Danish former football (soccer) player
- Viktor Rasmussen (1882–1956), Danish gymnast
- Wayne Rasmussen (born 1942), American football player
- Willy Rasmussen (1937–2018), Norwegian javelin thrower

== Other ==
- Anna Rasmussen, (1898–1983), Danish spiritualist medium
- Jesper Rasmussen Brochmand (1585–1652), Danish Lutheran clergyman, Bishop of Zealand
- Jørgen Buhl Rasmussen (born 1955), Danish businessman
- Jørgen Guldborg-Rasmussen, Danish scouting figure
- Sherri Rasmussen (1957–1986), American nurse killed by a police officer who had once dated her husband
- Terry Peder Rasmussen (1943–2010), American suspected serial killer involved in the Bear Brook murders
- Thomas Reinholdt Rasmussen (born 1972), Danish Lutheran bishop
