= 2014–15 HB Køge season =

HB Køge
2014–15 season
- Chairman: Henrik N. Andersen
- Manager: Henrik Pedersen
- 1st Division: TBC
- Danish Cup: TBC
- Top goalscorer: League: Brandão (3); All: Brandão (3)
- Highest home attendance: 1,610
- Lowest home attendance: 1,384
- Average home league attendance: 1,497

The 2014–2015 season is HB Køge's sixth season since formation in 2009, with the merger of Herfølge Boldklub and Køge Boldklub, and is representing the club's third consecutive season in 1st Division.

== Match results ==
=== Pre-season friendlies ===
5 July 2014	Haslev	1–6	HB Køge	Haslev Stadion
15:00	Mathias Fahlberg 35'	Report	Jeppe Kjær 13', Oliver Fredsted 20', Nikolaj Hansen 50', Emil Erbas 61', Luca Branccaccia 68', Emil Erbas (?), Nikolaj Hansen (?)

8 July 2014	HB Køge	1–0	Chicago Bridges	SEAS-NVE Park
18:00	Luka Bogdan 62'	Report

12 July 2014	1. F.C. Bitterfeld	0–8	HB Køge
		Report	Brandão 10', Philip Zinckernagel 24', Olajide Samuel Owolabi 28', Philip Zinckernagel 31', Brandão 37', Alexander Ludwig 60', Fernando Braz 66', Philip Zinckernagel 82'

=== 1st Division 2014–15 ===
==== July ====
25 July 2014 Game 1	Skive IK	1–1	HB Køge	Skive Stadion
	Jesper Henriksen 71'	Summary	Brandão 6'

==== August ====
3 August 2014 Game 2	HB Køge	2–3	Viborg FF	SEAS-NVE Park
15:00	Bruninho 38'; Sylvester Seeger-Hansen 59'	Summary	Mensah 15'; Lukas Lerager 63'; Poulsen 70'	Attendance: 1,384; Referee: (Denmark) Casper Thorsøe Jr

8 August 2014 Game 3	Vejle Boldklub	1–3	HB Køge	Vejle Stadion
18:30	Andreas Albers 39'	Report	Philip Zinckernagel 28'; Brandão 44'; Brandão 90+2'	Attendance: 1,872

14 August 2014 Game 4	HB Køge	0–0	AGF	SEAS-NVE Park
19:00		Report		Attendance: 1,610

22 August 2014 Game 5	FC Roskilde	1–1	HB Køge	Roskilde Idrætspark
19:00	Lars Brøgger 4'	Summary	Bruninho 82' (pen.)	Attendance: 1,423; Referee: (Denmark) Henning Jensen

31 August 2014 Game 6	HB Køge	0–2	AC Horsens	SEAS-NVE Park
15:00	Brandão (yellow card); Philip Zinckernagel (yellow card)	Summary	Troels Kløve 34'; Nielsen (yellow card); Berthelsen 65'	Attendance: 1,211; Referee: (Denmark) Benjamin Willaume-Jantzen

== September ==
5 September 2014 Game 7	HB Køge	2–1	Brønshøj BK	SEAS-NVE Park
19:00	Andersen (yellow card); Alexander Ludwig 84'; Bruninho 88'	Summary	Mads Gabel (yellow card); Sani Tahir (yellow card); Granskov (yellow card) (goal) 54'; Lazarevic (yellow card)	Attendance: 903; Referee: (Norway) Espen Eskås

14 September 2014 Game 8	FC Fredericia	0–0	HB Køge	Monjasa Park
15:00	Pedersen (yellow card); Mikkel Knudstrup (yellow card); Sebastien Ibeagha (yellow card); Kronborg (yellow card); Anders Hostrup (yellow card) 70' (yellow-red card)	Summary	Luka Bogdan (yellow card); Bruninho (yellow card)	Attendance: 651; Referee: (Denmark) Casper Thorsøe Jr

19 September 2014 Game 9	HB Køge	0–0	AB	SEAS-NVE Park
19:00	Anders Nielsen (yellow card); Bruninho (yellow card)	summary	Emil Farver (yellow card); Thomas Wiil-Andersen (yellow card); Rasmus Mathiesen (yellow card)	Attendance: 1,121; Referee: (Denmark) Lars Christoffersen

28 September 2014 Game 10	Lyngby	2–0	HB Køge	Lyngby Stadion
13:00	Tauber (yellow card); Frederik Gytkjær 61'; Mathias Mejer Knudsen 87'	Summary	Philip Zinckernagel (yellow card)	Attendance: 992; Referee: (Denmark) Chris Johansen

=== Danish Cup 2014–15 ===
27 August 2014 First Round	Næstved Boldklub	1–2	HB Køge	Næstved Stadion
19:00		Summary

24 September 2014 Second Round	Næsby BK	0–3	HB Køge	Næsby Stadion
16:30		Summary

29 October 2014 Third Round	HB Køge	2–1	AB	SEAS-NVE Park
18:30		Summary

== Player statistics ==
=== Squad ===
As of 10 August 2014

No.	Name	Position	Nationality	Date of Birth (Age)	Club caps	Club goals	Signed from	Fee
Goalkeepers
1	Frederik Due	GK	(Denmark)	18 July 1992 (age 34)	41	0	Academy	Free
25	Mikkel Gram-Jensen	GK	(Denmark)	1 December 1989 (age 36)	1	0	Ledøje-Smørum	Free
Defenders
2	Kauê	Defender	(Brazil)	15 June 1994 (age 32)	0	0	Boavista	Undisclosed
3	Luka Bogdan	Defender	(Croatia)	26 March 1996 (age 30)	3	0	Adriatic Split	Undisclosed
4	Christian Traoré	Defender	(Denmark)	18 April 1982 (age 44)	12	0	Lyngby Boldklub	Free
5	Casper Grønn	Defender	(Denmark)	1 October 1985 (age 41)	3	0	Akademisk Boldklub	Undisclosed
13	Søren Henriksen	Defender	(Denmark)	4 February 1992 (age 34)	39	0	FC Nordsjælland	Undisclosed
21	Daniel Arrocha	Defender	(Denmark)	9 January 1995 (age 31)	12	0	Academy	Free
23	Anders Nielsen	Defender	(Denmark)	19 May 1986 (age 40)	37	1	FC Roskilde	Undisclosed
27	Kristian Pedersen	Defender	(Denmark)	4 August 1994 (age 32)	2	0	Ringsted IF	Free
33	Alexander Ludwig	Defender	(Denmark)	30 June 1993 (age 33)	3	0	Vendsyssel FF	Undisclosed
Midfielders
6	Oskar Tranberg	Midfielder	(Denmark)	18 May 1995 (age 31)	0	0	Brøndby IF	Free
9	Rasmus Nielsen	Midfielder	(Denmark)	14 July 1987 (age 39)	15	0	Lyngby Boldklub	Undisclosed
15	Jannik Skov Hansen	Midfielder	(Denmark)	5 January 1993 (age 33)	21	0	Brøndby IF	Free
16	Delphin Tshiembe	Midfielder	(Democratic Republic of the Congo)	7 December 1991 (age 34)	19	2	Hellerup Idræts Klub	Undisclosed
18	Sylvester Seeger-Hansen	Midfielder	(Denmark)		27	2	Academy	Free
20	Kristian Andersen	Midfielder	(Denmark)	1 September 1994 (age 32)	2	0	Brøndby IF	Loan
32	Olajide Samuel Owolabi	Midfielder	(Nigeria)	27 February 1995 (age 31)	2	0	F.C. Midtjylland	Undisclosed
Forwards
8	Bruninho	Forward	(Brazil)	29 September 1989 (age 37)	3	1	Laejadense	Undisclosed
10	Brandão	Forward	(Brazil)	18 August 1990 (age 36)	3	3	Ypiranga	Undisclosed
11	Philip Zinckernagel	Forward	(Denmark)	16 December 1994 (age 31)	35	4	FC Nordsjælland	Undisclosed
12	Nikolaj Hansen	Forward	(Denmark)	15 March 1993 (age 33)	1	0	FC Vestsjælland	Undisclosed
17	Fernando	Forward	(Brazil)	13 March 1995 (age 31)	0	0	Cacadorense	Undisclosed
24	Oliver Jørgensen	Forward	(Denmark)	11 January 1995 (age 31)	3	0	Academy	Free
—	Justin Shaibu	Forward	(Denmark)	28 October 1997 (age 29)	0	0	Academy	Undisclosed

=== Appearances and goals ===
As of 10 August 2014.

No.	Pos	Nat	Player	Total		1st Division		Danish Cup	
No.	Pos	Nat	Player	Apps	Goals	Apps	Goals	Apps	Goals
1	GK	(Denmark) DEN	Frederik Due	2	0	2	0	0	0
2	DF	(Brazil) BRA	Kauê	0	0	0	0	0	0
3	DF	(Croatia) CRO	Luka Bogdan	3	0	3	0	0	0
4	DF	(Denmark) DEN	Christian Traoré	0	0	0	0	0	0
5	DF	(Denmark) DEN	Casper Grønn	3	0	3	0	0	0
6	MF	(Denmark) DEN	Oskar Tranberg	0	0	0	0	0	0
8	FW	(Brazil) BRA	Bruninho	3	1	3	1	0	0
9	MF	(Denmark) DEN	Rasmus Nielsen	3	0	3	0	0	0
10	FW	(Brazil) BRA	Brandão	3	3	3	3	0	0
11	FW	(Denmark) DEN	Philip Zinckernagel	3	1	3	1	0	0
12	FW	(Denmark) DEN	Nikolaj Hansen	1	0	1	0	0	0
13	DF	(Denmark) DEN	Søren Henriksen	0	0	0	0	0	0
15	MF	(Denmark) DEN	Jannik Skov Hansen	3	0	3	0	0	0
16	MF	(Democratic Republic of the Congo) COD	Delphin Tshiembe	0	0	0	0	0	0
17	FW	(Brazil) BRA	Fernando	0	0	0	0	0	0
18	MF	(Denmark) DEN	Sylvester Seeger-Hansen	3	1	3	1	0	0
20	MF	(Denmark) DEN	Kristian Andersen	2	0	2	0	0	0
21	DF	(Denmark) DEN	Daniel Arrocha	2	0	2	0	0	0
23	DF	(Denmark) DEN	Anders Nielsen	3	0	3	0	0	0
24	FW	(Denmark) DEN	Oliver Jørgensen	0	0	0	0	0	0
25	GK	(Denmark) DEN	Mikkel Gram-Jensen	1	0	1	0	0	0
27	DF	(Denmark) DEN	Kristian Pedersen	2	0	2	0	0	0
32	MF	(Nigeria) NGR	Olajide Samuel Owolabi	2	0	2	0	0	0
33	DF	(Denmark) DEN	Alexander Ludwig	3	0	3	0	0	0
—	FW	(Denmark) DEN	Justin Shaibu	8	0	8	0	0	0

=== Top scorers ===
Place	Position	Nation	Number	Name	1st Division	Danish Cup	Total
1	FW	(Brazil)	10	Brandão	3	0	3
2	FW	(Brazil)	8	Bruninho	1	0	1
3	MF	(Denmark)	18	Sylvester Seeger-Hansen	1	0	1
4	FW	(Denmark)	11	Philip Zinckernagel	1	0	1
TOTALS					6	0	6

=== Disciplinary record ===
Number	Position	Nation	Name	1st Division		Danish Cup		Total	
Number	Position	Nation	Name	Yellow card	Red card	Yellow card	Red card	Yellow card	Red card
5	DF	(Denmark)	Casper Grønn	1	0	0	0	1	0
8	FW	(Brazil)	Bruninho	1	0	0	0	1	0
9	MF	(Denmark)	Rasmus Nielsen	1	0	0	0	1	0
10	FW	(Brazil)	Brandão	1	0	0	0	1	0
18	MF	(Denmark)	Sylvester Seeger-Hansen	1	0	0	0	1	0
21	DF	(Denmark)	Daniel Arrocha	1	0	0	0	1	0
32	MF	(Nigeria)	Olajide Samuel Owolabi	1	0	0	0	1	0
33	DF	(Denmark)	Alexander Ludwig	1	0	0	0	1	0
			TOTALS	8	0	0	0	8	0
