= Rasmus =

Rasmus may refer to:

== People ==
- Rasmus (given name)
- Rasmus (surname)

== Arts and entertainment ==
- The Rasmus, a Finnish rock band formerly called Rasmus
  - The Rasmus (album), a self-titled studio album by the Finnish band
- the title character of Rasmus Klump, a Danish comic strip series
- Rasmus, a character in books by Swedish author Astrid Lindgren

== Places ==
- Rasmus, Michigan, an unincorporated community

== See also ==
- Rasmussen ("Rasmus' Son"), family name derived from "Rasmus"
- Erasmus (disambiguation)
