= Ole Rasmussen =

Ole Rasmussen may refer to:

- Ole Rasmussen (footballer, born 1952), Danish footballer who played 41 Danish national team games
- Ole Rasmussen (footballer, born 1960), Danish footballer who played two Danish national team games
- Ole Riber Rasmussen, Danish sports shooter
