= Anne Rasmussen =

Anne Rasmussen or Anna Rasmussen may refer to:

- Anna Rasmussen (1898–1983), Danish spiritualist medium
- Anna Rasmussen (climate expert), 21st century climate negotiator for small islands at COP meetings
- Anne Rasmussen (politician) (born 1971) Danish politician
- Anne Rasmussen (educator), (born 1959) American educator
- Ann-Helen Rasmussen (born 1990) Samoan New Zealand netball player
