= Rasmus (given name) =

Male given name

Rasmus is a shortened form of "Erasmus", a name which means "beloved" and was the name of Saint Erasmus of Formia. It is a common male name in the Nordic countries (including Estonia).

Notable people with the given name Rasmus include:

- Rasmus B. Anderson (1846–1936), American author, professor, and diplomat
- Rasmus Andersson, Swedish ice hockey player for the Calgary Flames
- Rasmus Bach (born 1995), Danish basketball player
- Rasmus Bille Bahncke, Danish songwriter, record producer and musician
- Rasmus Bartholin (1625–1698) (Latinized Erasmus Bartholinus), Danish scientist and physician
- Rasmus Bengtsson, Swedish football player
- Rasmus Bengtsson (ice hockey), Swedish ice hockey player
- Rasmus Bertelsen (born 1983), Danish association football manager
- Rasmus Bjerg, Danish actor
- Rasmus Boysen (born 1992), Danish handball player
- Rasmus Christensen (born 1991), Danish football player
- Rasmus Christiansen (actor), Danish actor
- Rasmus Dahlin, Swedish ice hockey player for the Buffalo Sabres
- Rasmus Daugaard, Danish football player
- Rasmus Edstrom, Swedish ice hockey player
- Rasmus Elfström (born 1997), Swedish politician
- Rasmus Elm, Swedish football player
- Rasmus Faber, Swedish music artist
- Rasmus Falk, Danish footballer
- Rasmus Festersen, Danish football player
- Rasmus Fleischer, Swedish historian, musician, freelance journalist
- Rasmus Flo (1851–1905), Norwegian teacher, philologist, magazine editor, translator and proponent for Nynorsk language
- Rasmus Frandsen (1886–1974), Danish rower
- Rasmus Green (1980–2006), Danish football player
- Rasmus Hansen (footballer born 1979), Danish football player
- Rasmus Hansen (gymnast) (1885–1967), Danish gymnast
- Rasmus Hansen (politician) (1797–1860s), Norwegian jurist and politician
- Rasmus Grønborg Hansen, Danish football player
- Rasmus Quist Hansen, Danish rower
- Rasmus Harboe (1868–1952), Danish sculptor
- Rasmus Hardiker, English actor
- Rasmus Hatledal (1885–1963), Norwegian topographer and military officer
- Rasmus Henning, Danish triathlon athlete
- Rasmus Højgaard (born 2001), Danish golfer
- Rasmus Højlund (born 2003), Danish footballer
- Rasmus Holten (born 2005), Norwegian footballer
- Rasmus Jensen (priest) (d. 1620), Danish Lutheran priest and the first Lutheran cleric in Canada
- Rasmus Jensen (speedway rider) (born 1993), Danish motorcycle rider
- Rasmus Jönsson, Swedish football player
- Rasmus Wejnold Jørgensen (born 1989), Danish pole vaulter
- Rasmus Kaljujärv, Estonian actor
- Rasmus Katholm, Danish football player
- Rasmus Kofoed, Danish chef and restaurateur
- Rasmus Kofoed (cricketer), Danish cricketer
- Rasmus Kupari, Finnish hockey player
- Rasmus Olsen Langeland (1873–1954), Norwegian politician and minister
- Rasmus Lerdorf, Greenlandic-Danish programmer and creator of the PHP programming language
- Rasmus Lindgren, Swedish football player
- Rasmus Løland (1861–1907), Norwegian journalist, novelist and children's writer
- Rasmus Lyberth, Greenlandic singer, songwriter and actor
- Rasmus Vestergaard Madsen (born 1991), Danish politician
- Rasmus Malling-Hansen (1835–1890), Danish inventor, minister and principal at the Royal Institute for the Deaf, and one of the true pioneers of the 19th century
- Rasmus Marvits, Danish football player
- Rasmus Midgett (1851–1926), US Life-Saving Service surfman in North Carolina who single-handedly rescued ten men from the sinking barkentine Priscilla
- Rasmus Olai Mortensen (1869–1934), Norwegian politician and minister
- Rasmus Mägi, Estonian hurdler
- Rasmus Nielsen (disambiguation)
- Rasmus Tønder Nissen (1822–1882), Norwegian politician
- Rasmus Nøhr, Danish musician and guitarist
- Rasmus Nordbø (1915–1983), Norwegian administrator and minister
- Rasmus Helveg Petersen (born 1968), Danish politician
- Rasmus Peetson (born 1995), Estonian footballer
- Rasmus Pettersen, Norwegian gymnast
- Rasmus Quaade, Danish road and track bicycle racer
- Rasmus Rändvee (born 1995), Estonian singer
- Rasmus Christian Rask (1787–1832), Danish scholar and philologist
- Rasmus Rasmussen (disambiguation), several people
- Rasmus Ristolainen, Finnish ice hockey player for the Philadelphia Flyers
- Rasmus Roosleht (born 2002), Estonian decathlete
- Rasmus Sandin, Swedish ice hockey player for the Washington Capitals
- Rasmus Lauge Schmidt, Danish handball player
- Rasmus Schüller (born 1991), Finnish football player
- Rasmus Seebach, Danish singer songwriter
- Rasmus Sindre (1859–1908), Norwegian newspaper editor and politician
- Rasmus Sjöstedt, Swedish football player
- Rasmus Skylstad (1893–1972), Norwegian diplomat
- Rasmus Carl Stæger (1800–1875), Danish entomologist
- Rasmus Steinsvik (1863–1913), Norwegian writer, magazine editor and newspaper editor
- Rasmus Stjerne, Danish curler
- Rasmus Svane (born 1997), German chess grandmaster
- Rasmus Thude, Danish singer and songwriter
- Rasmus Andreas Torset (1897–1965), Norwegian politician
- Rasmus Videbæk, Danish cinematographer
- Rasmus Vöge (born 1979), German politician
- Rasmus Wengberg, Swedish badminton player
- Rasmus Borregaard Winther, Danish League of Legends e-sport player
- Rasmus Würtz, Danish football player

== See also ==
- Rasmus (disambiguation)
