= Prime Minister Rasmussen =

Prime Minister Rasmussen may refer to:

- Poul Nyrup Rasmussen (born 1943), Prime Minister of Denmark from 1993 to 2001
- Anders Fogh Rasmussen (born 1953), Prime Minister of Denmark from 2001 to 2009
- Lars Løkke Rasmussen (born 1964), Prime Minister of Denmark from 2009 to 2011 and from 2015 to 2019

== See also ==
- Rasmussen
- List of prime ministers of Denmark
