= Capelli Sport Stadium =

Capelli Sport Stadium (or Capelli Sport Stadion) may refer to:

- Marina Auto Stadium, in Rochester, New York, United States, known as Capelli Sport Stadium in 2017
- Herfølge Stadium, in Herfølge, Denmark, known as Capelli Sport Stadion between 1 March 2018 and 13 February 2019
- Køge Idrætspark, known as Capelli Sport Stadion since 14 February 2019, home stadium of Danish association football club, HB Køge

== See also ==
- Capelli Sport
