= Rasmus Hansen =

Rasmus Hansen may refer to:

- Rasmus Hansen (footballer born 1979), Danish football midfielder
- Rasmus Hansen (gymnast) (1885–1967), Danish gymnast
- Rasmus Hansen (politician) (1797–1860s), Norwegian jurist and politician
- Rasmus Grønborg Hansen (born 1986), Danish football defensive midfielder
- Rasmus Quist Hansen (born 1980), Danish rower
- Rasmus Hansen (Danish politician), served as Defence Minister of Denmark in the 1940s and 1950s

== Similar Spellings ==
Rasmus Hansson (born 1954), Norwegian biologist, civil servant, environmental activist and politician
