= Erasmus (disambiguation) =

Erasmus (1466–1536) was a Dutch humanist scholar.

Erasmus may also refer to:

== Arts and entertainment ==
- Erasmus (Dune), a fictional robot in the Legends of Dune series by Kevin J. Anderson and Brian Herbert
- Erasmas, the narrator and protagonist of the 2008 novel Anathem by Neal Stephenson
- Erasmus, a character in the Quest for Glory video games
- Erasmus, a character in the 2003 film Barbie of Swan Lake
- Erasmus, a fictional ship in the 1975 novel Shōgun by James Clavell
- "Erasmus", a 2008 song from Dilettantes by You Am I

== Education ==
- Erasmus Programme, from 2014 Erasmus+, a European Commission programme for education, training, youth, and sport
  - Erasmus Mundus, a parallel master's level scholarship program
- Erasmus Brussels University of Applied Sciences and Arts
- Erasmus Hall High School, Brooklyn, New York
- Erasmus University Rotterdam, Netherlands
  - Erasmus MC (Medical Center), Rotterdam, home to the faculty of medicine of Erasmus University Rotterdam
- Erasmus Hospital, a teaching hospital in Brussels associated with the Université libre de Bruxelles (Free University of Brussels)

== People ==
- Erasmus (given name), a list of people with the name
- Erasmus (surname), a list of people with the name

== Transportation ==
- Erasmus (train), an express train between The Hague and Munich from 1973 to 2000
- Erasmus metro station, in Brussels
- Erasmus Bridge, or Erasmusbrug, a bridge in Rotterdam

== Other uses ==
- Erasmus Prize, an annual prize awarded by the Praemium Erasmianum Foundation
- 7907 Erasmus, a main-belt asteroid

== See also ==
- Gymnasium Erasmianum, Rotterdam, the second-oldest school in the Netherlands
- Rasmus (disambiguation)
