= Rasmus (surname) =

Rasmus is a surname. Notable people with the surname include:

- Claire Rasmus (born 1996), American swimmer
- Colby Rasmus (born 1986), American baseball player
- Cory Rasmus (born 1987), American baseball player
- Hans Rasmus Hansen (1896–1971), Danish politician
- Ingolf E. Rasmus (1906–1996), American lawyer and politician
- Pete Rasmus (1906–1975), American discus thrower

== See also ==
- Rasmussen
- Rasmusson
