= Justin Shaibu =

Danish footballer (born 1997)

Personal information
- Full name: Justin Kwabena Shaibu
- Date of birth: 28 October 1997 (age 29)
- Place of birth: Copenhagen, Denmark
- Height: 1.81 m (5 ft 11 in)
- Position: Forward

Team information
- Current team: Næstved
- Number: 11

Youth career
- –2012: Vallensbæk IF
- 2012–2014: HB Køge

Senior career*
Years	Team	Apps	(Gls)
2014–2016	HB Køge	20	(0)
2016–2020	Brentford	6	(0)
2018	→ Walsall (loan)	14	(0)
2018–2019	→ Boreham Wood (loan)	40	(9)
2019–2020	→ Boreham Wood (loan)	30	(5)
2020–2021	Fredericia	8	(2)
2021	Lyngby	6	(0)
2021–2022	Hobro	13	(2)
2022–2023	Hillerød	12	(1)
2025–2026	BK Frem	38	(8)
2026–	Næstved	7	(1)

International career
2014	Denmark U17	2	(0)
2014–2015	Denmark U18	7	(1)
2017	Denmark U20	2	(1)
- * Club domestic league appearances and goals as of 3 October 2026

Justin Kwabena Shaibu (born 28 October 1997) is a Danish professional footballer who plays as a forward for Danish 2nd Division club Næstved.

Shaibu began his senior career at HB Køge and transferred to English club Brentford in 2016. After spending four years on the fringes and away on loan, he returned to Denmark and began a nomadic career with a succession of lower league clubs. Shaibu was capped by Denmark at youth level.

== Club career ==
=== HB Køge ===
A forward, Shaibu began his career at Vallensbæk IF, before joining the academy at Danish 1st Division club HB Køge at the age of 14. He won his maiden call into the first team squad for a league match versus Horsens on 31 August 2014 and went on to make 9 appearances during the 2014–15 season. Shaibu won the club's Talent of the Year award for the 2014 calendar year. Shaibu played predominantly for the U19 team during 2015–16 and in a season disrupted by injuries he still managed 12 first team appearances and was rewarded with a new three-year contract midway through the campaign. He departed the Herfølge Stadion in July 2016, having made 23 appearances in two seasons.

=== Brentford ===
On 18 July 2016, Shaibu moved to England to sign a two-year B team contract at Championship club Brentford for an undisclosed fee, reported to be £40,000. He received his maiden call into the first team squad as a substitute for an EFL Cup first round match versus Exeter City on 9 August 2016 and made his debut when he replaced Emmanuel Ledesma in extra time during the eventual 1–0 defeat. After five goals in 12 appearances for the B team over the following six months, a lack of fit recognised forwards at the club meant that Shaibu made a minor breakthrough into the first team squad between February and April 2017 and he made four substitute appearances, before an ankle injury ended his season. Shaibu scored 10 goals in 18 B team appearances during the 2016–17 season and signed a new three-year contract on 5 May 2017, which saw him promoted into the first team squad for the 2017–18 season.

Shaibu's first appearance of the 2017–18 season came in an EFL Cup first round match versus AFC Wimbledon on 8 August 2017 and his entry onto the pitch during extra time was the first occasion that a fourth substitute had been utilised by Brentford in a competitive fixture. In the final minutes, he scored the first senior goal of his career to seal a 3–1 victory and the strike made him the first-ever fourth substitute to score in a competitive match in England. Shaibu continued in a substitute role, making four further appearances, before dropping out of the squad in October 2017 due to injuries.

From January 2018 onwards, Shaibu spent the remainder of his contract away on loan. He played the second half of the 2017–18 season on loan at League One club Walsall, for whom he failed to score in 14 appearances. He spent the 2018–19 and 2019–20 seasons on loan at National League club Boreham Wood, for whom he made 83 appearances and scored 18 goals during his two loans with the club. Shaibu was released by Brentford in June 2020, after making 10 appearances and scoring one goal during four years at Griffin Park.

=== Fredericia ===
On 16 October 2020, Shaibu signed a contract until the end of the 2020–21 season with Danish 1st Division club Fredericia. He made eight appearances and scored two goals before departing the club on 1 February 2021.

=== Lyngby ===
On 1 February 2021, Shaibu joined Superliga club Lyngby on a contract running until the end of the 2020–21 season, with an option for one further year. He made six appearances during the remainder of a season which ended with relegation to the 1st Division and departed when his contract expired.

=== Hobro ===
On 8 August 2021, Shaibu signed a one-year contract with 1st Division club Hobro on a free transfer. He made 13 appearances and scored two goals during an injury-affected 2021–22 season. Following his departure from the club, he played a period of the 2022–23 pre-season on trial with FC Helsingør, but did not win a contract.

=== Hillerød ===
On 8 September 2022, Shaibu signed a short-term contract with 1st Division club Hillerød on a free transfer. Following six appearances prior to the winter break, Shaibu signed a contract extension until the end of the 2022–23 season, with an option to extend. He finished the season with 12 appearances and one goal, scored in a 2–0 win over Fredericia on 19 February 2023. Shaibu departed when the club neglected to take up the option on his contract.

=== BK Frem ===
After recovering from an extended period injured, Shaibu began training with 2nd Division club BK Frem in November 2024. He was announced as a player for the club on 14 February 2025. Shaibu made 11 appearances and scored three goals during the remainder of a 2024–25 season that culminated in relegation to the 3rd Division. Shaibu made 27 appearances and scored five goals during the 2025–26 season, in which the club narrowly avoided relegation. He transferred out of the club in July 2026.

=== Næstved ===
On 17 July 2026, Shaibu transferred to 2nd Division club Næstved.

== International career ==
Shaibu won 11 caps and scored two goals for Denmark across U17, U18 and U20 levels.

== Playing style ==
Shaibu stated that he likes "to think I play like Romelu Lukaku. I have got great pace, a lot of energy, a lot of power and I am a great finisher".

== Personal life ==
Shaibu is of Ghanaian descent through his parents.

== Career statistics ==
As of match played 14 August 2026

Appearances and goals by club, season and competition
Club	Season	League			National cup (Note: Includes FA Cup)		League cup (Note: Includes EFL Cup)		Other		Total	
Club	Season	Division	Apps	Goals	Apps	Goals	Apps	Goals	Apps	Goals	Apps	Goals
HB Køge	2014–15	Danish 1st Division	8	0	1	0	—		—		9	0
HB Køge	2015–16	Danish 1st Division	12	0	2	0	—		—		14	0
HB Køge	Total		20	0	3	0	—		—		23	0
Brentford	2016–17	Championship	4	0	0	0	1	0	—		5	0
Brentford	2017–18	Championship	2	0	0	0	3	1	—		5	1
Brentford	Total		6	0	0	0	4	1	—		10	1
Walsall (loan)	2017–18	League One	14	0	—		—		—		14	0
Boreham Wood (loan)	2018–19	National League	40	9	3	1	—		6 (Note: 3 appearances in Herts Senior Cup, 2 appearances and 3 goals in FA Trophy, 1 appearance in Scottish Challenge Cup)	3	49	13
Boreham Wood (loan)	2019–20	National League	30	5	1	0	—		3 (Note: 2 appearances in National League play-offs, 1 appearance in FA Trophy)	0	34	5
Boreham Wood (loan)	Total		70	14	4	1	—		9	3	83	18
Fredericia	2020–21	Danish 1st Division	8	2	—		—		—		8	2
Lyngby	2020–21	Danish Superliga	6	0	—		—		—		6	0
Hobro	2021–22	Danish 1st Division	13	2	0	0	—		—		13	2
Hillerød	2022–23	Danish 1st Division	12	1	—		—		—		12	1
BK Frem	2024–25	Danish 2nd Division	11	3	—		—		—		11	3
BK Frem	2025–26	Danish 3rd Division	27	5	0	0	—		—		27	5
BK Frem	Total		38	8	0	0	—		—		38	8
Næstved	2026–27	Danish 2nd Division	3	0	0	0	—		—		3	0
Career total			190	27	7	1	4	1	9	3	210	32

== Honours ==
Boreham Wood

- Herts Senior Cup: 2018–19

Individual

- HB Køge Talent of the Year: 2014
