= Rasmusson =

Rasmusson is a surname of German and Swedish origin, or an Americanized spelling of Rasmussen. Notable people with the surname include:

- Birger Axel Rasmusson (1901–1964), Finnish chess player
- Hal Rasmusson (1900–1962), American cartoonist
- Mikael Rasmusson (born 1967), Swedish footballer
- Roland Rasmusson, Swedish footballer
