= Viby, Kerteminde =

Viby
- Town
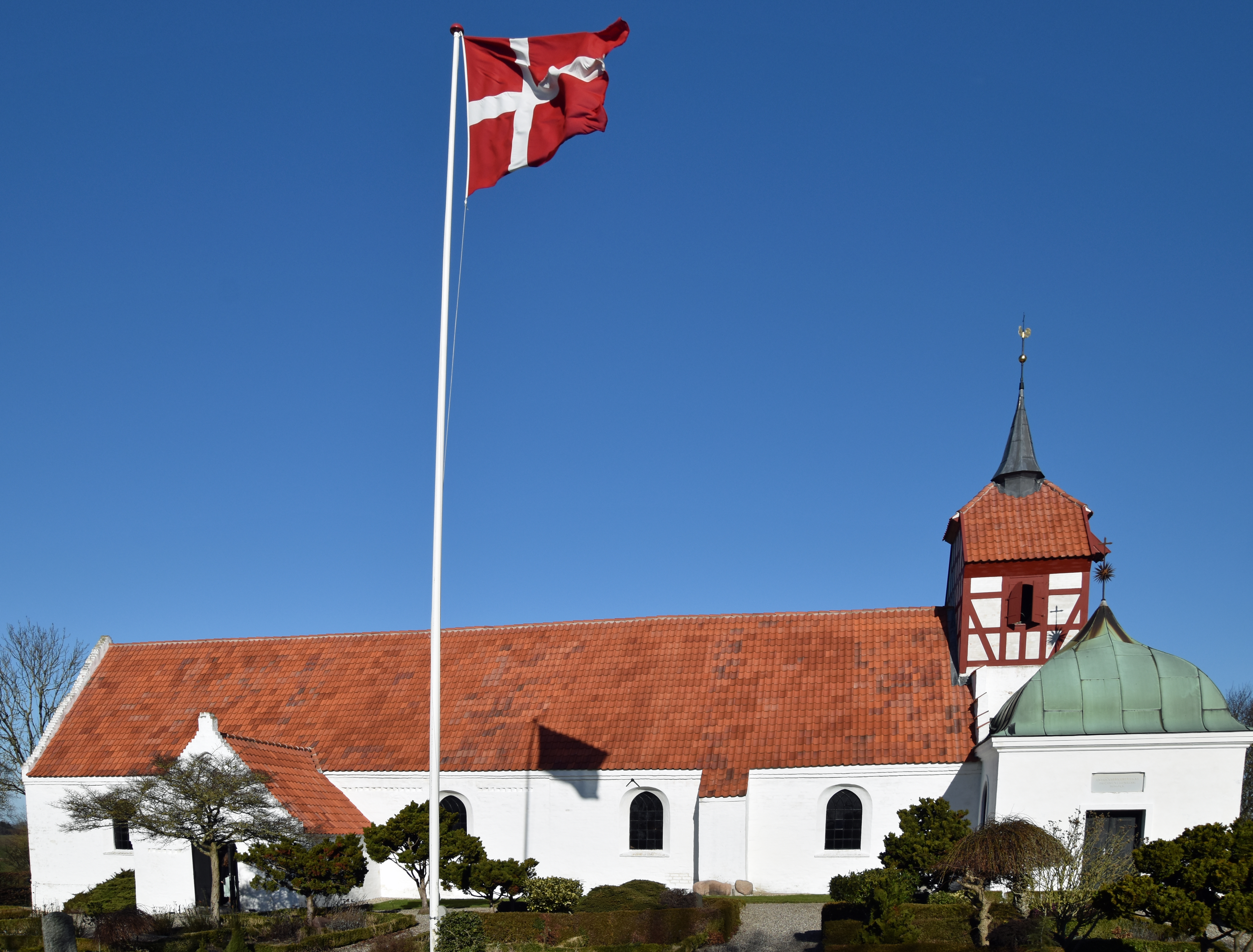
- Church of Viby

- Location in Denmark Viby (Region of Southern Denmark)
- Coordinates: 55°29′49″N 10°41′10″E
- Country: Denmark
- Region: Southern Denmark
- Municipality: Kerteminde
- Time zone: UTC+1 (CET)
  - Summer (DST): UTC+2 (CEST)

Viby is a town in Denmark, located in the Kerteminde Municipality of Southern Denmark. It is located on the north-eastern section of Funen island. It is roughly 5.5 km north of the town of Kerteminde.

== Viby Mill ==
The town is most notable for its large smock mill. The mill was built in 1854 as a replacement for a stump mill. The mill was rebuilt in 1869 after a lightning strike caused a fire that burned it down. The mill ceased commercial operations in 1956 and reopened in 1986 as a cultural attraction.

== Notable people ==
- Rasmus Rasmussen (1899 - 1974), Olympian gymnast.

== Gallery ==
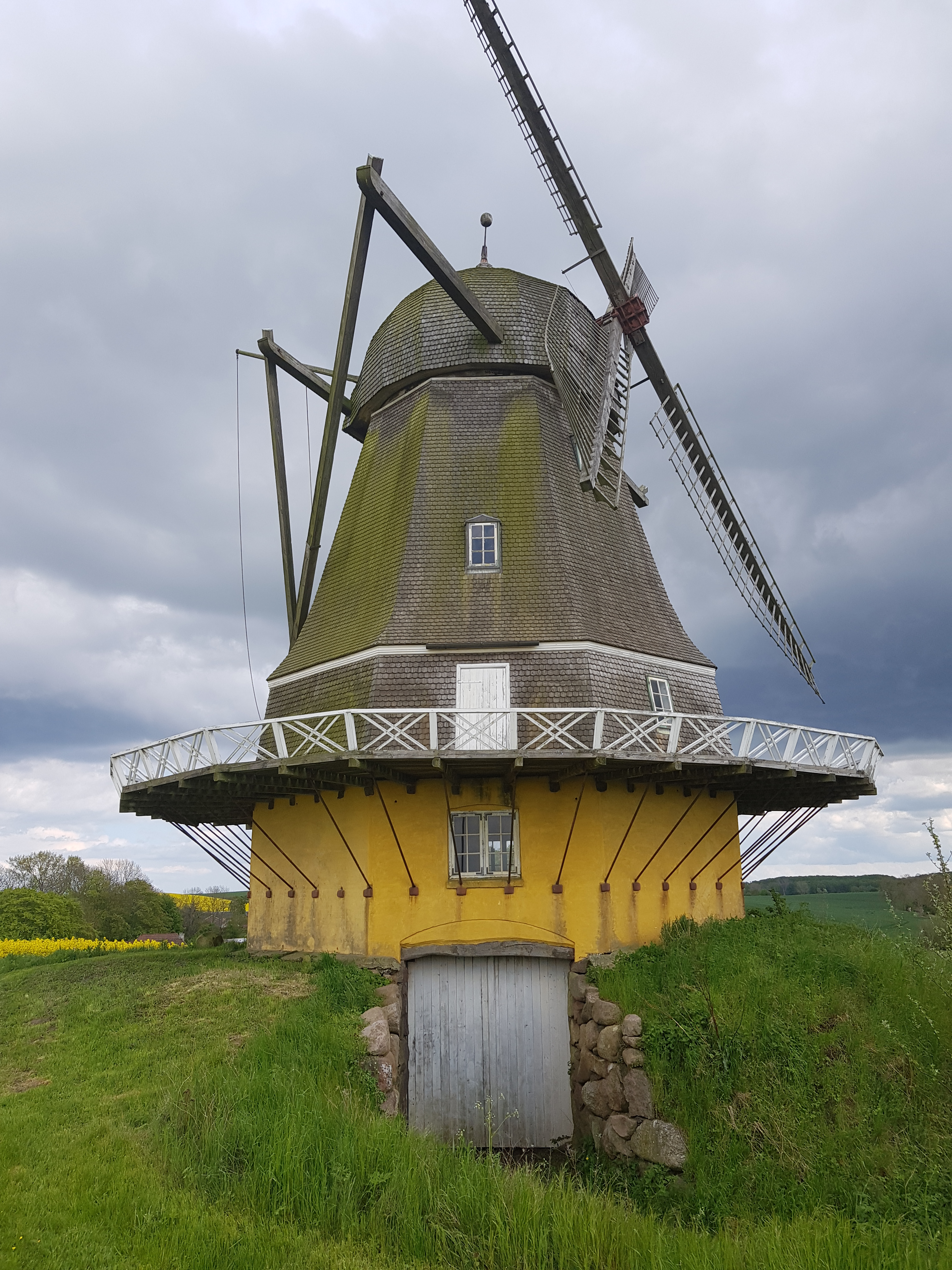
Smock mill of Viby

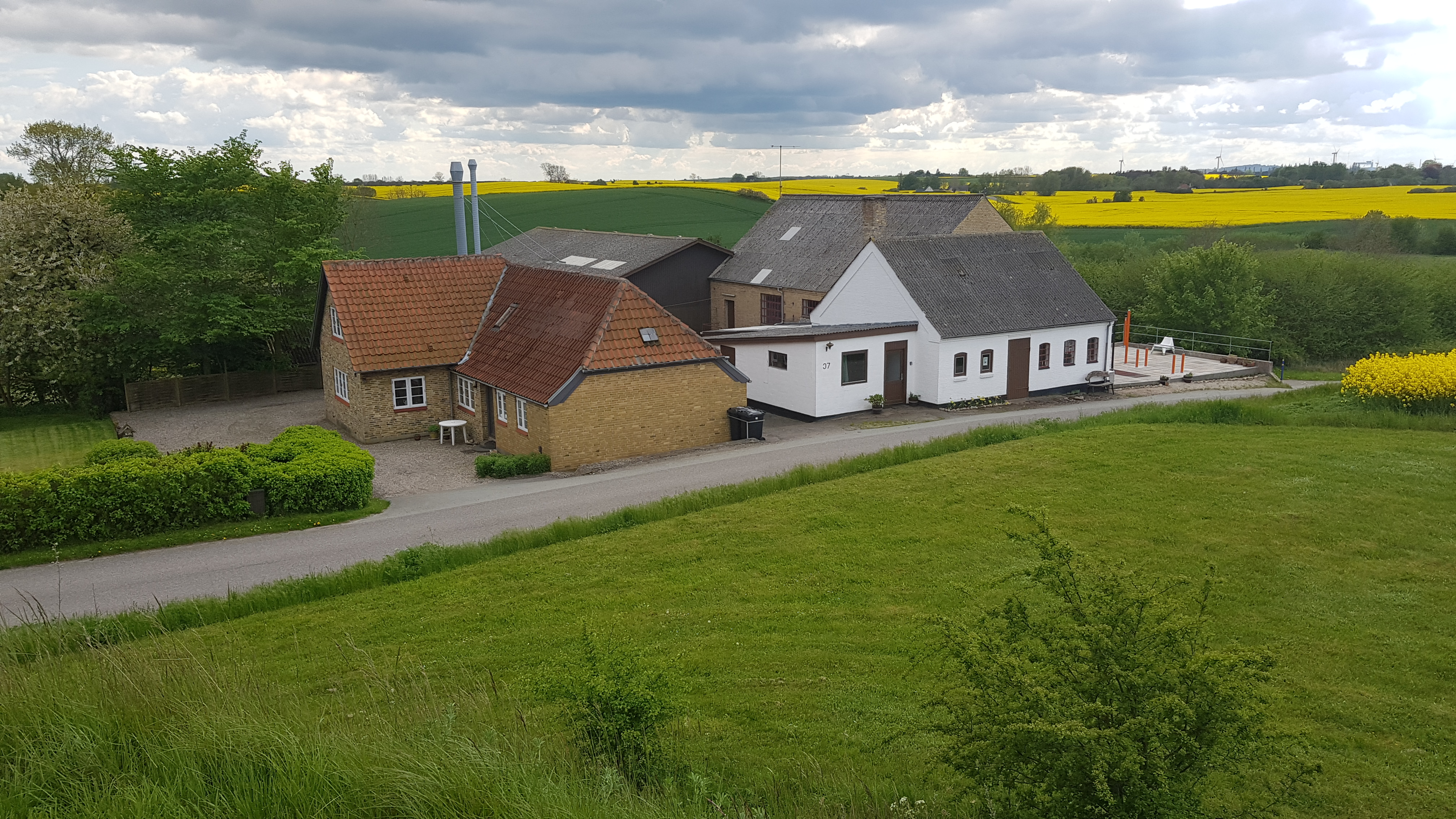
Houses in Viby

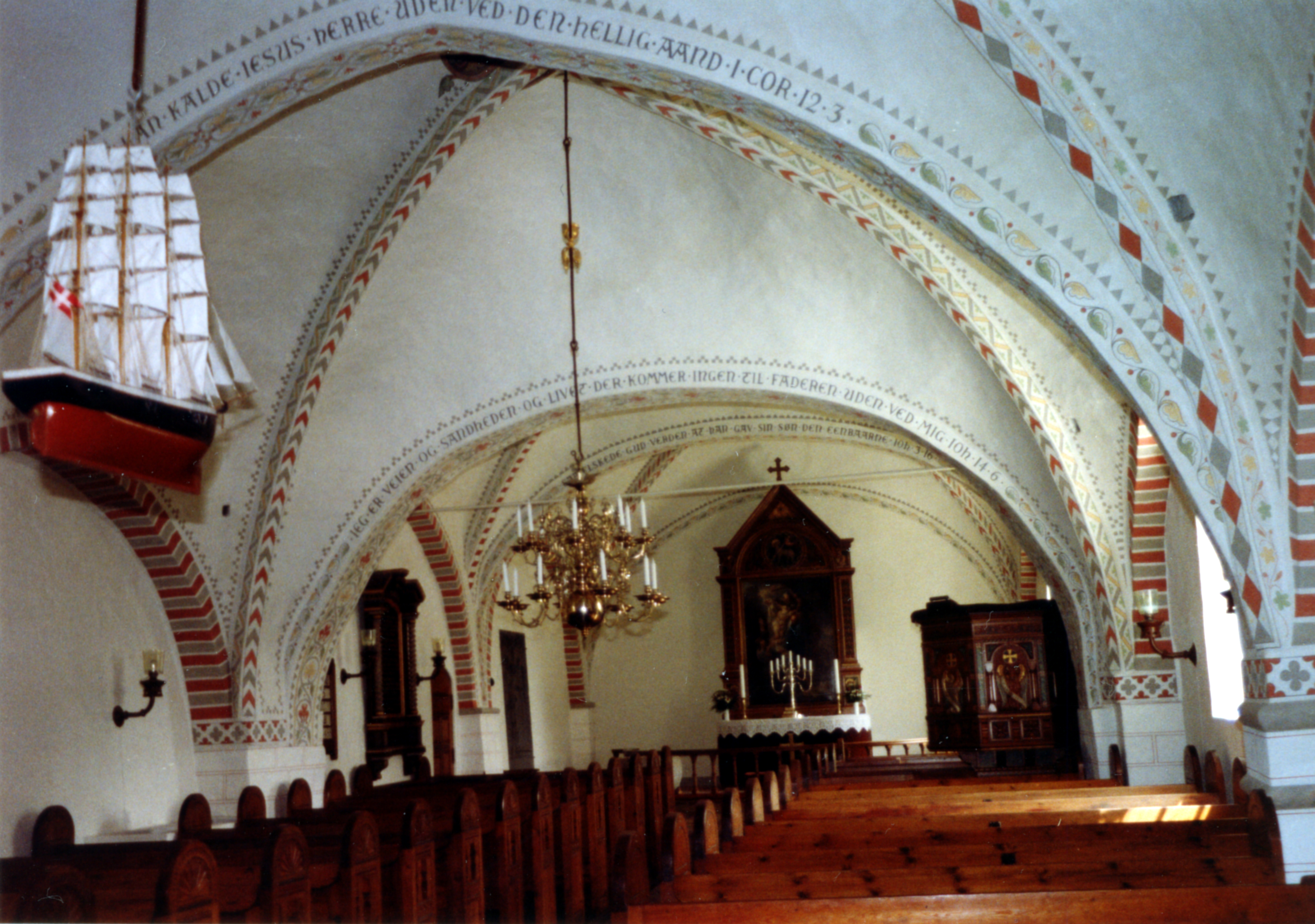
Interior of the Viby church
