= 2017–18 Brentford F.C. season =

English football team season

Brentford
2017–18 season
- Owner: Matthew Benham
- Chairman: Cliff Crown
- Head Coach: Dean Smith
- Stadium: Griffin Park
- Championship: 9th
- FA Cup: Third round (vs. Notts County)
- EFL Cup: Third round (vs. Norwich City)
- Top goalscorer: League: Neal Maupay (12); All: Neal Maupay (13)
- Highest home attendance: 12,367 (vs Queens Park Rangers, 21 April 2018)
- Lowest home attendance: 6,935 (vs Notts County, 6 January 2018)
- Average home league attendance: 10,234
Home colours	Away colours

The 2017–18 season was Brentford's 128th year in existence and fourth consecutive season in the Championship. Along with competing in the Championship, the club also participated in the FA Cup and League Cup.

The season covers the period from 1 July 2017 to 30 June 2018.

== Season Review ==
=== July ===
Over the summer break, Brentford brought in right back Henrik Dalsgaard from Zulte Waregem for an undisclosed fee and goalkeeper Luke Daniels from Scunthorpe United on a free transfer. Alan McCormack joined Luton Town following his release from the club. Germans Philipp Hofmann and Akaki Gogia both moved to 2. Bundesliga with the former moving to Greuther Furth and the latter initially staying at Dynamo Dresden after his loan move during the previous season but instead moving to Union Berlin shortly after making his move permanent. Youngster James Ferry joined Stevenage for an undisclosed fee. Goalkeeper Jack Bonham signed a new one-year contract extension and moved to Carlisle United on loan until January. Midfielder Konstantin Kerschbaumer joined Armenia Bielefeld on loan until the end of the season. Also signing new contracts were Florian Jozefzoon, who added 12 months to his initial contract, and Nico Yennaris, who extended his stay until 2021. On 7 July, South African midfielder Kamohelo Mokotjo signed for an undisclosed fee from Dutch side FC Twente. On the same day, Brentford began their pre-season with a 5–1 win against Aldershot Town. Reece Cole and Sergi Canós both scored braces with Jozefzoon adding to the scoreline late on. The first-team travelled to Divonne-les-Bains on the French/Swiss border for a training camp. During their time there, striker Neal Maupay sealed his transfer to Brentford from Saint-Étienne. Brentford drew 1–1 against Lausanne-Sport with Lasse Vibe scoring the Bees' only goal. Following their return to England, Brentford signed EFL Young Player of the Year Ollie Watkins from Exeter City for a reported £1.8 million fee. On 19 July, Brentford travelled to Oxford United for another pre-season friendly which ended 4–3 to the Bees. Jozefzoon, Vibe, Cole and Canós were the goalscorers. On 21 July, it was announced that Danish forward Emiliano Marcondes will join Brentford in January on a three-and-a-half-year deal after his current deal at FC Nordsjælland expires. Brentford's first game at Griffin Park of the season ended 2–2 against Premier League side Southampton. Vibe poked the ball home in the first half with Josh Clarke scoring the second after Fraiser Forster spilled his cross. The unbeaten pre-season campaign continued at MK Dons where Maupay, Watkins and Jozefzoon all scored in a 3–2 win against the League One side. On 29 July, Brentford played their final game before the start of the season at home against Celta de Vigo. Vibe and Jota scored in the 2–1 win against the Europa League semi-finalists.

=== August ===
Brentford's first Championship game of the season was at newly promoted Sheffield United which ended in a 1–0 defeat. Billy Sharp headed in a Leon Clarke cross just before half-time. Despite improving in the second-half, Brentford could not find the equaliser. Brentford now have not won on the opening day for six consecutive seasons. On 7 August, young full-back Tom Field joined Bradford City on loan until January. Watkins and Justin Shaibu scored their first goals for the club in the first round of the League Cup against AFC Wimbledon. Their goals came in extra-time after Paul Robinson's first-half lobbed strike and Romaine Sawyers' equaliser in the second-half. The 3–1 result after extra-time sealed Brentford's place in the second round. On 10 August, Cole joined Newport County on loan until January. The B-team midfielder was in the matchday squad for the League Cup tie against AFC Wimbledon. Brentford's first league match at home was a 7-goal thriller against Nottingham Forest. After John Egan's header, two stunning strikes from Andreas Bouchalakis and Daryl Murphy's tap in left the Bees trailing 3–1 midway through the second-half. Andreas Bjelland gave some hope for Brentford as his header was adjudged to have crossed the line by goal-line technology, a first for Griffin Park. However, Kieran Dowell scored for Forest four minutes later and Maupay's late goal proved only to be a consolation with the final score finishing 4–3 to the visitors.

On 15 August, Brentford proposed amendments for the new Brentford Community Stadium which included a decrease in capacity from 20,000 to 17,250 and construction starting in 2018 with completion in late 2019 or early 2020. Midfielder Ryan Woods was given compassionate leave after the tragic loss of his baby. He would not feature for Brentford's next few games. Brentford next faced Bristol City at Griffin Park. Despite conceding an early Josh Brownhill goal, Brentford rallied in the second half and took the lead through Watkins and Maupay and would have been further in front had it not been for an inspired performance from opposing goalkeeper Frank Fielding. Eight minutes into added time due to an injury to Josh McEachran, Bobby Reid pounced and denied Brentford's first league win of the season. The Bees' poor run of results continued at Ipswich Town where, despite a dominant first half, Martyn Waghorn and Joe Garner's goals sealed a 2–0 win for the home side, leaving Brentford bottom of the league table. In the second round of the League Cup, Brentford beat local rivals Queens Park Rangers 4–1 in a West London derby. There were goals from Egan, Maupay and an own goal from Ariel Borysiuk in the first-half, plus one for QPR from Darnell Furlong. Clarke capped off a fine win at Loftus Road with a finish into the bottom corner late in the second-half. Brentford's final game of August ended in a goalless draw against high-spending Wolverhampton Wanderers. Brentford headed into the international break with no wins in their first five league games.

Brentford had a busy final few days of the transfer window. On 30 August, former captain Harlee Dean joined Birmingham City for an undisclosed fee. The following day, on transfer deadline day, Jota and Maxime Colin joined Dean at Birmingham City for undisclosed fees as well, although Jota's fee was confirmed to be Birmingham's record transfer fee. B-team defenders Jan Holldack and Manny Onariase both left the club for KFC Uerdingen 05 and Rotherham United respectively.

=== September ===
On 1 September, B-team captain Zain Westbrooke joined Solihull Moors on loan for a month. Brentford's first match after the transfer window was against Aston Villa. Despite a good performance, they could not find a goal to give them their first league victory as the match ended 0–0. On 12 September, Brentford travelled to Hillsborough where they let a lead slip to give Sheffield Wednesday a win. Yennaris scored early with a volley but Gary Hooper netted on the brink of half-time and Ross Wallace completed the comeback from Jordan Rhodes' pull-back. There was concern late into stoppage time as defender Dalsgaard was knocked unconscious and given treatment on the pitch for several minutes before being taken off on a stretcher. Brentford continued their win-less streak in the league at home to Reading. Clarke rifled in from a tight angle after good play between himself and Maupay but Liam Kelly equalised with a penalty after Rico Henry fouled Tyler Blackett as the game ended 1–1. On 18 September, central defender Chris Mepham signed a five-year contract and was promoted to the first team squad. The next day, he made his first competitive start, along with Theo Archibald, in the third round of the League Cup against Norwich City where he gave away the penalty for Norwich's first goal. After Marco Vrancic scored from the spot, Brentford were awarded a penalty themselves, but Yoann Barbet skied it into the stands. Vrancic then curled in a free kick in the second half and Josh Murphy chipped over the oncoming Daniels to give the Canaries a three-goal advantage. Clarke scored a consolation late on as Brentford crashed out of the League Cup, losing 3–1. Brentford finally found their first league win of the season against bottom side Bolton Wanderers. Barbet made amends for his penalty miss in the cup with a superb free-kick in the first half. Yennaris then scored from 30 yards in the second half with Watkins adding a third shortly before full-time. On 26 September, Brentford hosted Derby County at Griffin Park. Despite completely dominating, Brentford could not break down the Derby defence and found themselves behind to Joe Ledley's debut goal for the Rams. It took 86 minutes for Watkins to find a deserved equaliser to grab a point for the Bees. Brentford picked up their sixth draw of the season against Middlesbrough. Despite scoring two goals, courtesy of Barbet's header and Watkins' finish, Middlesbrough came back from behind twice through Martin Braithwaite and Fabio to secure a 2–2 result. Henry was stretchered off in this game and suffered a serious knee injury which would sideline him for a significant length of time.

== Transfers ==
=== Transfers in ===
Players transferred in
Date	Pos.	Name	Previous club	Fee	Ref.
1 July 2017	MF	(Scotland) Theo Archibald	(Scotland) Celtic	Undisclosed	
1 July 2017	MF	(Scotland) Ali Coote	(Scotland) Dundee United	Undisclosed	
1 July 2017	DF	(Denmark) Henrik Dalsgaard	(Belgium) Zulte Waregem	Undisclosed	
1 July 2017	GK	(England) Luke Daniels	(England) Scunthorpe United	Free	
1 July 2017	FW	(Finland) Marcus Forss	(England) West Bromwich Albion	Free	
7 July 2017	MF	(South Africa) Kamohelo Mokotjo	(Netherlands) FC Twente	Undisclosed	
14 July 2017	FW	(France) Neal Maupay	(France) Saint-Étienne	£1,800,000	
18 July 2017	FW	(England) Ollie Watkins	(England) Exeter City	£1,800,000	
1 August 2017	DF	(Denmark) Mads Bech Sørensen	(Denmark) AC Horsens	Undisclosed	
1 January 2018	MF	(Denmark) Emiliano Marcondes	(Denmark) FC Nordsjælland	Free	
14 January 2018	MF	(Finland) Jaakko Oksanen	(Finland) HJK Helsinki	Undisclosed	
30 January 2018	MF	(Republic of Ireland) Chiedozie Ogbene	(Republic of Ireland) Limerick	Undisclosed	

=== Loans in ===
Players loaned in
Start date	Pos.	Name	Parent Club	End date	Ref.
1 July 2017	MF	(Denmark) Nikolaj Kirk	(Denmark) FC Midtjylland	End of season	

=== Transfers out ===
Players transferred out
Date	Pos.	Name	Subsequent Club	Fee	Ref.
1 July 2017	MF	(Germany) Akaki Gogia	(Germany) Dynamo Dresden	Undisclosed	
1 July 2017	FW	(Germany) Philipp Hofmann	(Germany) Greuther Fürth	Undisclosed	
30 August 2017	DF	(England) Harlee Dean	(England) Birmingham City	Undisclosed	
31 August 2017	MF	(Germany) Jan Holldack	(Germany) Uerdingen 05	Undisclosed	
31 August 2017	MF	(Spain) Jota	(England) Birmingham City	Undisclosed	
31 August 2017	DF	(England) Manny Onariase	(England) Rotherham United	Undisclosed	
31 August 2017	DF	(France) Maxime Colin	(England) Birmingham City	Undisclosed	
10 February 2018	FW	(Denmark) Lasse Vibe	(China) Changchun Yatai	Undisclosed	

=== Loans out ===
Players loaned out
Start date	Pos.	Name	Subsequent Club	End date	Ref.
1 July 2017	GK	(Republic of Ireland) Jack Bonham	(England) Carlisle United	End of season	
1 July 2017	MF	(Austria) Konstantin Kerschbaumer	(Germany) Arminia Bielefeld	End of season	
7 August 2017	DF	(Republic of Ireland) Tom Field	(England) Bradford City	1 January 2018	
10 August 2017	MF	(England) Reece Cole	(Wales) Newport County	1 January 2018	
1 September 2017	MF	(England) Zain Westbrooke	(England) Solihull Moors	29 September 2017	
11 October 2017	MF	(England) Zain Westbrooke	(England) Leyton Orient	10 January 2018	
19 January 2018	DF	(Greece) Ilias Chatzitheodoridis	(England) Cheltenham Town	End of season	
29 January 2018	MF	(Denmark) Justin Shaibu	(England) Walsall	End of season	

=== Released ===
Players released
Date	Pos.	Name	Subsequent club	Join date	Ref.
30 June 2018	FW	(Portugal) Herson Alves	(England) Maidenhead United	1 July 2018	
30 June 2018	FW	(Germany) Raphael Assibey-Mensah	(Germany) TSV Schott Mainz	September 2018	
30 June 2018	DF	(Denmark) Andreas Bjelland	(Denmark) FC Copenhagen	9 July 2018	
30 June 2018	MF	(England) Bradley Clayton	(England) Chesham United	August 2018	
30 June 2018	FW	(Slovenia) Jan Novak	(Slovenia) NK Krka	22 August 2018	
30 June 2018	MF	(England) Zain Westbrooke	(England) Coventry City	1 July 2018	

== Pre-season ==
=== Friendlies ===
7 July 2017	Aldershot Town	1–5	Brentford	Aldershot
19:30 BST	Mensah 30'	Report	Cole 48', 52'; Canós 56', 73'; Jozefzoon 84'	Stadium: Recreation Ground

15 July 2017	Lausanne-Sport	1–1	Brentford	Saint-Prex, Switzerland
16:00 CEST	Pak Kwang-ryong 65'	Report	Vibe 14'	Stadium: Complexe Sportif de Divonne-les-Bains

19 July 2017	Oxford United	3–4	Brentford	Oxford
19:45 BST	Johnson 36' (pen.); Hemmings 56'; Henry 61'	Report	Jozefzoon 8'; Vibe 30'; Cole 78'; Canós 80'	Stadium: Kassam Stadium; Attendance: 2,216; Referee: John Busby

22 July 2017	Brentford	2–2	Southampton	Brentford
15:00 BST	Vibe 40'; Clarke 82'	Report	Austin 53', 60'	Stadium: Griffin Park

25 July 2017	Milton Keynes Dons	2–3	Brentford	Denbigh
19:45 BST	Seager 7', 28'	Report	Maupay 21'; Watkins 56'; Jozefzoon 76'	Stadium: Stadium MK; Referee: Craig Hicks

29 July 2017	Brentford	2–1	Celta de Vigo	Brentford
15:00 BST	Vibe 26'; Jota 34'	Report	Guidetti 53'	Stadium: Griffin Park; Attendance: 2,675

== Competitions ==
=== Championship ===
==== League table ====
Pos	Team	Pld	W	D	L	GF	GA	GD	Pts
7	Preston North End	46	19	16	11	57	46	+11	73
8	Millwall	46	19	15	12	56	45	+11	72
9	Brentford	46	18	15	13	62	52	+10	69
10	Sheffield United	46	20	9	17	62	55	+7	69
11	Bristol City	46	17	16	13	67	58	+9	67

Source: English Football League
Rules for classification: 1) Points; 2) Goal difference; 3) Number of goals scored

==== Results summary ====
Overall								Home						Away					
Pld	W	D	L	GF	GA	GD	Pts	W	D	L	GF	GA	GD	W	D	L	GF	GA	GD
46	18	15	13	62	52	+10	69	9	11	3	37	24	+13	9	4	10	25	28	−3

Source: Brentford F.C.

==== Result by matchday ====
Round	1	2	3	4	5	6	7	8	9	10	11	12	13	14	15	16	17	18	19	20	21	22	23	24	25	26	27	28	29	30	31	32	33	34	35	36	37	38	39	40	41	42	43	44	45	46
Ground	A	H	H	A	H	A	A	H	A	H	A	H	H	A	A	H	A	H	A	H	A	H	A	H	H	A	H	A	H	A	H	A	H	A	A	A	H	H	H	A	H	A	A	H	A	H
Result	L	L	D	L	D	D	L	D	W	D	D	W	D	W	W	W	L	D	D	W	L	D	W	W	W	L	W	W	L	L	D	W	W	L	W	L	L	D	D	W	W	W	D	W	L	D
Position	18	22	20	24	23	23	23	22	20	20	19	18	18	18	15	12	13	13	14	11	13	13	12	12	10	11	11	9	11	11	10	10	10	10	10	11	11	11	11	11	10	10	10	8	9	9

Source: Brentford F.C.
A = Away; H = Home; W = Win; D = Draw; L = Loss

==== Matches ====
5 August 2017 1	Sheffield United	1–0	Brentford	Sheffield
15:00 BST	Sharp 39'	Report		Stadium: Bramall Lane; Attendance: 26,746; Referee: Stephen Martin

12 August 2017 2	Brentford	3–4	Nottingham Forest	Brentford
15:00 BST	Egan 38'; Bjelland 79'; Henry (yellow card) 81'; Maupay 90+2'	Report	Bouchalakis (yellow card) 28' (goal) 41', 47'; Murphy 43'; Vaughan (yellow card) 82'; Dowell 83'; Mills (yellow card) 86'	Stadium: Griffin Park; Attendance: 10,169; Referee: James Linington

15 August 2017 3	Brentford	2–2	Bristol City	Brentford
19:45 BST	Barbet (yellow card) 49'; Watkins 56'; McEachran (yellow card) 60'; Maupay 77'	Report	Brownhill 5'; Pack (yellow card) 35'; Paterson (yellow card) 74'; O'Neil (yellow card) 90+6'; Reid 90+8'	Stadium: Griffin Park; Attendance: 9,811; Referee: Peter Bankes

19 August 2017 4	Ipswich Town	2–0	Brentford	Ipswich
15:00 BST	Waghorn 35'; Garner 51'; Kenlock (yellow card) 80'	Report	Sawyers (yellow card) 40'; Maupay (yellow card) 45+3'	Stadium: Portman Road; Attendance: 15,348; Referee: Oliver Langford

26 August 2017 5	Brentford	0–0	Wolverhampton Wanderers	Brentford
15:00 BST	Dean (yellow card) 36'	Report	Doherty (yellow card) 43'	Stadium: Griffin Park; Attendance: 10,351; Referee: Tim Robinson

9 September 2017 6	Aston Villa	0–0	Brentford	Birmingham
15:00 BST		Report		Stadium: Villa Park; Attendance: 29,799; Referee: Scott Duncan

12 September 2017 7	Sheffield Wednesday	2–1	Brentford	Owlerton
19:45 BST	Hooper 45+1'; Wallace 70'; Hunt (yellow card) 89'; Rhodes (yellow card) 90+1'; Lee (yellow card) 90+2'	Report	Yennaris 9'	Stadium: Hillsborough; Attendance: 23,536; Referee: Jeremy Simpson

16 September 2017 8	Brentford	1–1	Reading	Brentford
15:00 BST	Clarke 16'; Egan (yellow card) 66'; Henry (yellow card) 69'; Maupay (yellow card) 72'	Report	McShane (yellow card) 5'; McCleary (yellow card) 25'; Edwards (yellow card) 34'; Kelly 70' (pen.); Obita (yellow card) 81'	Stadium: Griffin Park; Attendance: 9,739; Referee: Tony Harrington

23 September 2017 9	Bolton Wanderers	0–3	Brentford	Horwich
15:00 BST	Burke (yellow card) 45+1'; Karacan (yellow card) 56'	Report	Barbet 38'; Yennaris 62' (yellow card) 76'; Watkins 84'	Stadium: Macron Stadium; Attendance: 13,897; Referee: Darren England

26 September 2017 10	Brentford	1–1	Derby County	Brentford
19:45 BST	Woods (yellow card) 30'; Dalsgaard (yellow card) 36'; Watkins (yellow card) 45+5' (goal) 86'	Report	Ledley 15'; Forsyth (yellow card) 25'; Wisdom (yellow card) 30'; Johnson (yellow card) 30'; Winnall (yellow card) 37'; Keogh (yellow card) 76'	Stadium: Griffin Park; Attendance: 8,679; Referee: Andy Davies

30 September 2017 11	Middlesbrough	2–2	Brentford	Middlesbrough
15:00 BST	Braithwaite 68'; Christie (yellow card) 70'; Fábio 76'; Bamford (yellow card) 90+4'; Randolph (yellow card) 90+6'	Report	Barbet 29'; Dalsgaard (yellow card) 67'; Watkins 72' (yellow card) 90+5'; Maupay (yellow card) 90+6'	Stadium: Riverside Stadium; Attendance: 24,545; Referee: Paul Tierney

14 October 2017 12	Brentford	1–0	Millwall	Brentford
15:00 BST	Sawyers 47'; Woods (yellow card) 83'; Mepham (yellow card) 90+3'	Report	Ferguson (yellow card) 53'	Stadium: Griffin Park; Attendance: 9,622; Referee: Lee Probert

21 October 2017 13	Brentford	3–3	Sunderland	Brentford
15:00 BST	Yennaris 8'; Jozefzoon 47'; Dalsgaard (yellow card) 61'; Maupay 78' (yellow card) 90+4'	Report	Grabban 13', 45+2' (pen.); Oviedo (yellow card) 37'; Bentley 40' (o.g.); Cattermole (yellow card) 52'; Ndong (yellow card) 72'; Koné (yellow card) 90+1'	Stadium: Griffin Park; Attendance: 10,726; Referee: Darren England

28 October 2017 14	Preston North End	2–3	Brentford	Preston
15:00 BST	Maguire (yellow card) 2' (goal) 41'; Huntington (yellow card) 25'; Barkhuizen 66'; Woods (yellow card) 82'	Report	Yennaris 25'; Sawyers 56'; Watkins 69'	Stadium: Deepdale; Attendance: 12,005; Referee: David Coote

1 November 2017 15	Birmingham City	0–2	Brentford	Birmingham
19:45 GMT	Davis (yellow card) 54'; Morrison (yellow card) 73'	Report	Woods (yellow card) 31'; Watkins 74' (pen.); Maupay 84'	Stadium: St Andrew's; Attendance: 19,045; Referee: Jonathan Moss

4 November 2017 16	Brentford	3–1	Leeds United	Brentford
17:30 GMT	Maupay 22'; Watkins (penalty missed) 44' (yellow card) 45+3'; Yennaris (yellow card) 68'; Barbet 85' (yellow card) 90'; Woods 90+3'	Report	O'Kane (yellow card) 45+3'; Alioski 67'; Sáiz (yellow card) 90'	Stadium: Griffin Park; Attendance: 11,068; Referee: Stuart Attwell

18 November 2017 17	Cardiff City	2–0	Brentford	Cardiff
15:00 GMT	Ralls 8'; Ward 36'; Feeney (yellow card) 59'; Ecuele Manga (yellow card) 84'	Report		Stadium: Cardiff City Stadium; Attendance: 16,335; Referee: Andy Madley

21 November 2017 18	Brentford	1–1	Burton Albion	Brentford
19:45 GMT	Jozefzoon 54'; Watkins (yellow card) 82'	Report	Lund (yellow card) 68'; Turner 78'	Stadium: Griffin Park; Attendance: 7,957; Referee: Chris Kavanagh

27 November 2017 19	Queens Park Rangers	2–2	Brentford	Shepherd's Bush
19:45 GMT	Freeman (yellow card) 15' (goal) 90+5'; Mackie (yellow card) 27'; Smith 90+3'	Report	Vibe 52', 81' (yellow card) 63'; Maupay (yellow card) 90+6'	Stadium: Loftus Road Stadium; Attendance: 13,410; Referee: Stephen Martin

2 December 2017 20	Brentford	3–1	Fulham	Brentford
15:00 GMT	Canós 33' (yellow card) 36'; Sawyers 49'; Watkins 85'	Report	Kebano 25'; Odoi (yellow card) 45' (yellow-red card) 53'; Cairney (yellow card) 59'; Fredericks (yellow card) 82'; Norwood (yellow card) 89'	Stadium: Griffin Park; Attendance: 11,090; Referee: Robert Madley

9 December 2017 21	Hull City	3–2	Brentford	Kingston-upon-Hull
15:00 GMT	Grosicki 54'; Larsson 70'; Irvine 75'; Aina (yellow card) 78'; Luer (yellow card) 90+8'; Toral (yellow card) 90+10'	Report	Meyler 47' (o.g.); Egan 87' (yellow card) 90+1'; Maupay (yellow card) 90+10'	Stadium: KCOM Stadium; Attendance: 14,620; Referee: Simon Hooper

16 December 2017 22	Brentford	0–0	Barnsley	Brentford
15:00 GMT	Sawyers (yellow card) 90+2'	Report	Yiadom (yellow card) 59'; Gardner (yellow card) 90+1'	Stadium: Griffin Park; Attendance: 9,868; Referee: David Coote

23 December 2017 23	Norwich City	1–2	Brentford	Norwich
19:45 GMT	Stiepermann (yellow card) 45+2'; Pritchard (yellow card) 79'; Oliveira 90+1'	Report	Vibe 36', 41'; Sawyers (yellow card) 58'; Maupay (yellow card) 61'	Stadium: Carrow Road; Attendance: 26,725; Referee: Jeremy Simpson

26 December 2017 24	Brentford	2–1	Aston Villa	Brentford
19:30 GMT	Sawyers 22'; McEachran (yellow card) 37'; Barbet (yellow card) 41'; Vibe 52'	Report	Onomah 30'; Elphick (yellow card) 68'	Stadium: Griffin Park; Attendance: 11,341; Referee: Keith Stroud

30 December 2017 25	Brentford	2–0	Sheffield Wednesday	Brentford
15:00 GMT	Vibe 20'; Sawyers (yellow card) 39'; Jozefzoon 83'	Report	Wallace (yellow card) 39'; Hutchinson (yellow card) 44'; Pudil (yellow card) 49'	Stadium: Griffin Park; Attendance: 10,853; Referee: David Coote

2 January 2018 26	Wolverhampton Wanderers	3–0	Brentford	Wolverhampton
19:30 GMT	Neves 57'; Douglas 59'; Neves (yellow card) 65'; Boly (yellow card) 77'; Jota 80'	Report	Watkins (yellow card) 22'; Woods (yellow card) 56'; Barbet (yellow card) 67'	Stadium: Molineux Stadium; Attendance: 28,475; Referee: Andrew Madley

13 January 2018 27	Brentford	2–0	Bolton Wanderers	Brentford
15:00 GMT	Jozefzoon 40'; Maupay 90+1'	Report	Litte (yellow card) 22'; Wheater (yellow card) 42'; Madine (yellow card) 67'; Robinson (yellow card) 87'; Ameobi (yellow card) 90+2'	Stadium: Griffin Park; Attendance: 9,507; Referee: Andy Davies

20 January 2018 28	Reading	0–1	Brentford	Reading
15:00 GMT	van den Berg (yellow card) 10'; Gunter (yellow card) 45+1'; Evans (yellow card) 90+4'	Report	Watkins (yellow card) 60'; Vibe 74'; Woods (yellow card) 84'; Bjelland (yellow card) 85'; Canós (yellow card) 86'	Stadium: Madejski Stadium; Attendance: 17,893; Referee: Darren Bond

27 January 2018 29	Brentford	0–1	Norwich City	Brentford
15:00 GMT	Canós (yellow card) 83'; Bjelland (yellow card) 90+5'	Report	Maddison 5'; Lewis (yellow card) 40'; Hanley (yellow card) 90+7'	Stadium: Griffin Park; Attendance: 10,252; Referee: Scott Duncan

3 February 2018 30	Derby County	3–0	Brentford	Derby
15:00 GMT	Huddlestone 30'; Jerome 34' (yellow card) 63'; Vydra 90+2' (pen.); Olsson (yellow card) 90+3'	Report	Canós (red card) 21'; Woods (yellow card) 37'; Bjelland (yellow card) 71'	Stadium: Pride Park Stadium; Attendance: 25,938; Referee: Peter Bankes

10 February 2018 31	Brentford	1–1	Preston North End	Brentford
15:00 GMT	McEachran (yellow card) 17'; Jozefzoon 62'; Egan (yellow card) 90+1'	Report	Fisher (yellow card) 32'; Gallagher (yellow card) 63'; Barkhuizen 54'; Cunningham (yellow card) 73' (yellow-red card) 74'	Stadium: Griffin Park; Attendance: 9,194; Referee: Simon Hooper

17 February 2018 32	Sunderland	0–2	Brentford	Sunderland
15:00 GMT	Jones (yellow card) 36'; Fletcher (yellow card) 65'; McGeady (yellow card) 74'	Report	Mokotjo 13'; Maupay 28'	Stadium: Stadium of Light; Attendance: 27,702; Referee: John Brooks

20 February 2018 33	Brentford	5–0	Birmingham City	Brentford
19:45 GMT	Watkins 31', 81'; Jozefzoon 41'; Maupay 51'; Roberts 54' (o.g.)	Report	Gardner (yellow card) 45+3'; Lowe (yellow card) 87'	Stadium: Griffin Park; Attendance: 9,511; Referee: Geoff Eltringham

24 February 2018 34	Leeds United	1–0	Brentford	Leeds
15:00 GMT	Anita (yellow card) 23'; Alioski (yellow card) 24'; Cooper 31'	Report	Sawyers (yellow card) 45+3'; Woods (yellow card) 53'; Egan (yellow card) 73'; Barbet (yellow card) 80'	Stadium: Elland Road; Attendance: 28,428; Referee: Oliver Langford

3 March 2018 P	Brentford	v	Cardiff City
15:00 GMT
Note: Match postponed on match day, due to adverse weather conditions.

6 March 2018 35	Burton Albion	0–2	Brentford	Burton upon Trent
19:45 GMT	Flanagan (yellow card) 59'	Report	Maupay (yellow card) 33'; McFadzean 60' (o.g.); Watkins 80'	Stadium: Pirelli Stadium; Attendance: 3,464; Referee: Tony Harrington

10 March 2018 36	Millwall	1–0	Brentford	Bermondsey
15:00 GMT	Saville 1'; Elliott (yellow card) 75'; Cahill (yellow card) 88'	Report		Stadium: The Den; Attendance: 13,251; Referee: Stuart Attwell

13 March 2018 37	Brentford	1–3	Cardiff City	Brentford
19:45 GMT	Maupay 5'; Mepham (yellow card) 65'	Report	Ecuele Manga (yellow card) 18'; Bamba 25'; Paterson 45+2'; Damour (yellow card) 55'; Zohore 58'; Morrison (yellow card) 71'	Stadium: Griffin Park; Attendance: 8,549; Referee: James Linington

17 March 2018 38	Brentford	1–1	Middlesbrough	Brentford
15:00 GMT	Woods (yellow card) 14'; Macleod 34'; Sawyers (yellow card) 87' (yellow-red card) 90+1'; Mepham (yellow card) 90+6'	Report	Traoré 21'; Clayton (yellow card) 29'; Gibson (yellow card) 51'; Bešić (yellow card) 62'; Friend (yellow card) 90'	Stadium: Griffin Park; Attendance: 11,134; Referee: Simon Hooper

30 March 2018 39	Brentford	1–1	Sheffield United	Brentford
15:00 BST	Mepham 68'; Woods (red card) 69'	Report	Basham (yellow card) 50', (goal) 55'; Stevens (yellow card) 60'; Blackman (red card) 69'	Stadium: Griffin Park; Attendance: 11,174; Referee: Jeremy Simpson

2 April 2018 40	Bristol City	0–1	Brentford	Bristol
15:00 BST	Smith (yellow card) 18'; Brownhill (yellow card) 76'; Bryan (yellow card) 86'	Report	Watkins (yellow card) 15'; Maupay 80'; Clarke (yellow card) 83'	Stadium: Ashton Gate Stadium; Attendance: 22,049; Referee: Keith Stroud

7 April 2018 41	Brentford	1–0	Ipswich	Brentford
15:00 BST	McEachran (yellow card) 51'; Maypay 72'; Canos (yellow card) 90+1'	Report	Carter-Vickers (yellow card) 17'; Connolly (yellow card) 51'; Knudsen (yellow card) 72'	Stadium: Griffin Park; Attendance: 10,939; Referee: Robert Jones

10 April 2018 42	Nottingham Forest	0–1	Brentford	Nottingham
19:45 BST	Guédioura (yellow card) 52'; Darikwa (yellow card) 55'	Report	Dalsgaard 81'	Stadium: City Ground; Attendance: 20,596; Referee: Andy Davis

14 April 2018 43	Fulham	1–1	Brentford	Fulham
17:30 BST	Mitrović 70'; Fredericks (yellow card) 90+3'	Report	Mepham (yellow card) 69'; Maupay (yellow card) 76' (goal) 90+4'	Stadium: Craven Cottage; Attendance: 20,877; Referee: Neil Swarbrick

21 April 2018 44	Brentford	2–1	Queens Park Rangers	Brentford
15:00 BST	Canós 16'; Woods (yellow card) 26'; Watkins (yellow card) 33' (penalty missed) 43'; Jozefzoon 69'	Report	Ingram (yellow card) 42'; Sylla 45+2' (yellow card) 52'; Bidwell (yellow card) 50'; Scowen (yellow card) 52'	Stadium: Griffin Park; Attendance: 12,367; Referee: Andy Madley

28 April 2018 45	Barnsley	2–0	Brentford	Barnsley
15:00 BST	Moore 11'; McBurnie 51'	Report	Barbet (yellow card) 82'	Stadium: Oakwell; Attendance: 13,127; Referee: Darren Bond

6 May 2018 46	Brentford	1–1	Hull City	Brentford
12:30 BST	Canós 12'	Report	Bowen 45+2'; Wilson (penalty missed) 58'	Stadium: Griffin Park; Attendance: 11,475; Referee: James Linington

=== FA Cup ===
6 January 2018 Third round	Brentford	0–1	Notts County	Brentford
15:00 GMT		Report	Tootle (yellow card) 52'; Duffy (yellow card) 54'; Stead 65'; Jones (yellow card) 68'; Noble (yellow card) 90+2'	Stadium: Griffin Park; Attendance: 6,935; Referee: Tim Robinson

=== EFL Cup ===
8 August 2017 First round	AFC Wimbledon	1–3 (a.e.t.)	Brentford	Norbiton
19:45 BST	Robinson 25'	Report	Sawyers 69'; Watkins 105+1'; Shiabu 119'	Stadium: Kingsmeadow; Attendance: 3,229; Referee: Dean Whitestone

22 August 2017 Second round	Queens Park Rangers	1–4	Brentford	Shepherd's Bush
19:45 BST	Baptise (yellow card) 17'; Furlong 43'; Robinson (yellow card) 47'	Report	Borysiuk 10' (o.g.); Egan 19'; Maupay 32'; Clarke 83'	Stadium: Loftus Road; Attendance: 9,719; Referee: Chris Sarginson

19 September 2017 Third round	Brentford	1–3	Norwich City	Brentford
19:45 BST	Barbet (yellow card) 15' (penalty missed) 30'; Clarke 90'	Report	Vrančić 10' (pen.), 51'; Watkins (yellow card) 31'; Zimmermann (yellow card) 55'; Hoolahan (yellow card) 60'; Murphy 68'	Stadium: Griffin Park; Attendance: 4,863; Referee: James Linington

== First team squad ==
Players' ages are as of the opening day of the 2017–18 season.

Squad No.	Name	Nationality	Position	Date of birth (age)	Signed from	Signed in	Notes
Goalkeepers
1	Dan Bentley	(England)	GK	13 July 1993 (aged 24)	Southend United	2016	
28	Luke Daniels	(England)	GK	5 January 1988 (aged 29)	Scunthorpe United	2017	
37	Ellery Balcombe	(England)	GK	15 October 1999 (aged 17)	Academy	2016	
Defenders
3	Rico Henry	(Jamaica)	LB	8 July 1997 (aged 20)	Walsall	2016	
5	Andreas Bjelland	(Denmark)	CB / LB	11 July 1988 (aged 29)	FC Twente	2015	
14	John Egan	(Republic of Ireland)	CB	20 October 1992 (aged 24)	Gillingham	2016	
22	Henrik Dalsgaard	(Denmark)	RB	27 July 1989 (aged 28)	Zulte Waregem	2017	
29	Yoann Barbet	(France)	CB / LB	10 May 1993 (aged 24)	Chamois Niortais	2015	
30	Tom Field	(Republic of Ireland)	LB	14 March 1997 (aged 20)	Academy	2015	Loaned to Bradford City
31	Ilias Chatzitheodoridis	(Greece)	LB	5 November 1997 (aged 19)	Arsenal	2016	Loaned to Cheltenham Town
33	Chris Mepham	(Wales)	CB	5 November 1997 (aged 19)	Academy	2014	
34	Mads Bech Sørensen	(Denmark)	LB / CB	7 January 1999 (aged 18)	AC Horsens	2017	
Midfielders
4	Lewis Macleod	(Scotland)	LM / AM	16 June 1994 (aged 23)	Rangers	2015	
8	Nico Yennaris	(China)	CM / RB	24 May 1993 (aged 24)	Arsenal	2014	
10	Josh McEachran	(England)	CM	1 March 1993 (aged 24)	Chelsea	2015	
12	Kamohelo Mokotjo	(South Africa)	DM	11 March 1991 (aged 26)	FC Twente	2017	
15	Ryan Woods	(England)	CM	13 December 1993 (aged 23)	Shrewsbury Town	2015	
17	Emiliano Marcondes	(Denmark)	AM / ST / LW	9 March 1995 (aged 22)	Nordsjælland	2018	
18	Alan Judge	(Republic of Ireland)	AM / LM	11 November 1988 (aged 28)	Blackburn Rovers	2014	
19	Romaine Sawyers	(Saint Kitts and Nevis)	AM / CM	2 November 1991 (aged 25)	Walsall	2016	
20	Josh Clarke	(England)	RM / RB	5 July 1994 (aged 23)	Academy	2013	
25	Theo Archibald	(Scotland)	RM	5 March 1998 (aged 19)	Celtic	2017	
32	Reece Cole	(England)	CM	17 February 1998 (aged 19)	Academy	2016	Loaned to Newport County
35	Zain Westbrooke	(England)	CM	28 October 1996 (aged 20)	Academy	2011	Loaned to Solihull Moors and Leyton Orient
Attackers
7	Florian Jozefzoon	(Suriname)	LW / RW	9 February 1991 (aged 26)	PSV Eindhoven	2017	
9	Neal Maupay	(France)	ST	14 August 1996 (aged 20)	Saint-Étienne	2017	
11	Ollie Watkins	(England)	ST / LW / AM	30 December 1995 (aged 21)	Exeter City	2017	
24	Chiedozie Ogbene	(Nigeria)	RW / LW	1 May 1997 (aged 20)	Limerick	2018	
27	Justin Shaibu	(Denmark)	ST	28 October 1997 (aged 19)	HB Køge	2016	Loaned to Walsall
47	Sergi Canós	(Spain)	RW / LW	2 February 1997 (aged 20)	Norwich City	2017	
Players who departed mid-season
2	Maxime Colin	(France)	RB	15 November 1991 (aged 25)	RSC Anderlecht	2015	Transferred to Birmingham City
6	Harlee Dean	(England)	CB	26 July 1991 (aged 26)	Southampton	2012	Transferred to Birmingham City
23	Jota	(Spain)	RM / AM	16 June 1991 (aged 26)	Celta de Vigo	2014	Transferred to Birmingham City
21	Lasse Vibe	(Denmark)	ST / RW	22 February 1987 (aged 30)	IFK Göteborg	2015	Transferred to Changchun Yatai

== Statistics ==
=== Appearances and goals ===
No.	Pos	Nat	Player	Total		Championship		FA Cup		League Cup	
No.	Pos	Nat	Player	Apps	Goals	Apps	Goals	Apps	Goals	Apps	Goals
1	GK	(England) ENG	Dan Bentley	45	0	45+0	0	0+0	0	0+0	0
3	DF	(Jamaica) JAM	Rico Henry	8	0	8+0	0	0+0	0	0+0	0
4	MF	(Scotland) SCO	Lewis Macleod	11	1	5+5	1	1+0	0	0+0	0
5	DF	(Denmark) DEN	Andreas Bjelland	35	1	32+2	1	0+0	0	1+0	0
7	MF	(Suriname) SUR	Florian Jozefzoon	43	7	31+8	7	1+0	0	2+1	0
8	MF	(China) CHN	Nico Yennaris	44	4	31+10	4	0+0	0	3+0	0
9	FW	(France) FRA	Neal Maupay	46	13	25+17	12	1+0	0	3+0	1
10	MF	(England) ENG	Josh McEachran	28	0	14+11	0	1+0	0	1+1	0
11	FW	(England) ENG	Ollie Watkins	48	11	39+6	10	0+1	0	1+1	1
12	MF	(South Africa) RSA	Kamohelo Mokotjo	39	1	25+10	1	1+0	0	3+0	0
14	DF	(Ireland) EIR	John Egan	34	3	32+1	2	0+0	0	1+0	1
15	MF	(England) ENG	Ryan Woods	40	1	35+4	1	0+0	0	0+1	0
17	MF	(Denmark) DEN	Emiliano Marcondes	13	0	2+10	0	1+0	0	0+0	0
18	MF	(Ireland) EIR	Alan Judge	14	0	3+10	0	0+1	0	0+0	0
19	MF	(Saint Kitts and Nevis) SKN	Romaine Sawyers	44	5	36+6	4	0+0	0	2+0	1
20	MF	(England) ENG	Josh Clarke	32	3	23+5	1	1+0	0	3+0	2
22	DF	(Denmark) DEN	Henrik Dalsgaard	32	1	29+0	1	0+0	0	0+3	0
24	FW	(Ireland) EIR	Chiedozie Ogbene	2	0	0+2	0	0+0	0	0+0	0
25	MF	(Scotland) SCO	Theo Archibald	3	0	0+2	0	0+0	0	1+0	0
27	FW	(Denmark) DEN	Justin Shaibu	5	1	0+2	0	0+0	0	0+3	1
28	GK	(England) ENG	Luke Daniels	5	0	1+0	0	1+0	0	3+0	0
29	DF	(France) FRA	Yoann Barbet	37	3	32+2	3	1+0	0	2+0	0
30	DF	(Ireland) EIR	Tom Field	0	0	0+0	0	0+0	0	0+0	0
31	DF	(Greece) GRE	Ilias Chatzitheodoridis	4	0	0+0	0	1+0	0	3+0	0
32	MF	(England) ENG	Reece Cole	0	0	0+0	0	0+0	0	0+0	0
33	DF	(Wales) WAL	Chris Mepham	23	1	17+4	1	1+0	0	1+0	0
34	DF	(Denmark) DEN	Mads Bech Sørensen	0	0	0+0	0	0+0	0	0+0	0
35	MF	(England) ENG	Zain Westbrooke	0	0	0+0	0	0+0	0	0+0	0
37	GK	(England) ENG	Ellery Balcombe	0	0	0+0	0	0+0	0	0+0	0
47	FW	(Spain) ESP	Sergi Canós	31	3	17+13	3	0+1	0	0+0	0
2	DF	(France) FRA	Maxime Colin	5	0	3+0	0	0+0	0	2+0	0
6	DF	(England) ENG	Harlee Dean	4	0	3+0	0	0+0	0	1+0	0
21	FW	(Denmark) DEN	Lasse Vibe	19	7	14+5	7	0+0	0	0+0	0
23	MF	(Spain) ESP	Jota	4	0	4+0	0	0+0	0	0+0	0

Source: Soccerbase
Italic: denotes player is no longer with team

=== Goalscorers ===
No.	Pos	Player	FLC	FAC	FLC	Total
9	FW	Neal Maupay	12	0	1	13
11	FW	Ollie Watkins	10	0	1	11
7	FW	Florian Jozefzoon	7	0	0	7
21	FW	Lasse Vibe	7	0	0	7
19	MF	Romaine Sawyers	4	0	1	5
8	MF	Nico Yennaris	4	0	0	4
14	DF	John Egan	2	0	1	3
20	MF	Josh Clarke	1	0	2	3
29	DF	Yoann Barbet	3	0	0	3
47	FW	Sergi Canós	3	0	0	3
4	MF	Lewis Macleod	1	0	0	1
5	DF	Andreas Bjelland	1	0	0	1
12	MF	Kamohelo Mokotjo	1	0	0	1
15	MF	Ryan Woods	1	0	0	1
22	DF	Henrik Dalsgaard	1	0	0	1
27	FW	Justin Shaibu	0	0	1	1
33	DF	Chris Mepham	1	0	0	1
		Own Goals	3	0	1	4
		Totals	62	0	8	70

Source: Soccerbase
Italic: denotes player is no longer with team

=== Disciplinary record ===
No.	Pos	Player	Yellow card	Red card
15	MF	Ryan Woods	9	1
19	MF	Romaine Sawyers	7	1
47	FW	Sergi Canós	4	1
9	FW	Neal Maupay	9	0
11	FW	Ollie Watkins	8	0
29	DF	Yoann Barbet	7	0
10	MF	Josh McEachran	4	0
14	DF	John Egan	4	0
33	DF	Chris Mepham	4	0
5	DF	Andreas Bjelland	3	0
22	DF	Henrik Dalsgaard	3	0
3	DF	Rico Henry	2	0
8	MF	Nico Yennaris	2	0
6	DF	Harlee Dean	1	0
20	MF	Josh Clarke	1	0
21	FW	Lasse Vibe	1	0
		Totals	69	3

Source: Soccerbase
Italic: denotes player is no longer with team

=== Management ===
Name	Nat	From	To	Record All Comps					Record League				
Name	Nat	From	To	P	W	D	L	W %	P	W	D	L	W %
Dean Smith	(England)	30 November 2015	present	50	20	15	15	40.00|	46	18	15	13	39.13

=== Summary ===
Games played	50 (46 Championship, 1 FA Cup, 3 League Cup)
Games won	20 (18 Championship, 0 FA Cup, 2 League Cup)
Games drawn	15 (15 Championship, 0 FA Cup, 0 League Cup)
Games lost	15 (13 Championship, 1 FA Cup, 1 League Cup)
Goals scored	70 (62 Championship, 0 FA Cup, 8 League Cup)
Goals conceded	58 (52 Championship, 1 FA Cup, 5 League Cup)
Clean sheets	15 (15 Championship, 0 FA Cup, 0 League Cup)
Yellow cards	69 (68 Championship, 0 FA Cup, 1 League Cup)
Red cards	3 (3 Championship, 0 FA Cup, 0 League Cup)
Worst discipline	(9 yellows and 1 red) Ryan Woods
Biggest league win	5–0 (vs Birmingham City)
Worst league defeat	0–3 (vs Wolverhampton Wanderers & Derby County)
Most appearances	47 Ollie Watkins
Top scorer (league)	12 Neal Maupay
Top scorer (all competitions)	13 Neal Maupay

== Kit ==
Supplier: adidas
Sponsor(s): LeoVegas

Home	Away	Third

Source: Brentford F.C.
