= Kristian Andersen =

Danish footballer (born 1994)

Personal information
- Full name: Kristian Mamush Andersen
- Date of birth: 1 September 1994 (age 32)
- Place of birth: Ethiopia
- Height: 1.70 m (5 ft 7 in)
- Position: Midfielder

Youth career
- AB
- ?–2013: Brøndby

Senior career*
| Years | Team | Apps | (Gls) |
| 2013–2015 | Brøndby | 5 | (0) |
| 2014–2015 | → HB Køge (loan) | 28 | (0) |
| 2015–2018 | HB Køge | 92 | (9) |
| 2018–2021 | IK Brage | 63 | (10) |
| 2021 | Kolding | 7 | (0) |
| 2022 | NSÍ Runavík | 8 | (0) |
| 2022 | Hillerød | 11 | (0) |

International career
| 2009–2010 | Denmark U16 | 6 | (0) |
| 2010 | Denmark U17 | 2 | (0) |
| 2012 | Denmark U18 | 6 | (0) |
| 2013 | Denmark U20 | 5 | (0) |
- * Club domestic league appearances and goals as of 19:09, 7 April 2025 (UTC)

Kristian Mamush Andersen (born 1 September 1994) is a Danish professional footballer who plays as a midfielder.

== Career ==
=== Brøndby ===
Andersen made his first-team debut for Brøndby IF on 10 March 2013 in a 3–0 away win against AGF. He made three additional substitute appearances during the season.

On 14 March 2013, Andersen signed a new two-year contract with Brøndby, keeping him at the club until the summer of 2015.

He was officially promoted to the first team on 1 July 2013 and assigned jersey number 25.

Having made only one league appearance during the 2013–14 season, his agent confirmed in January 2014 that the club was working to arrange a loan move to secure more playing time.

In June 2016, Andersen announced that he would not renew his contract and would leave the club in the upcoming transfer window in pursuit of regular first-team football.

==== Loan to HB Køge ====
On 24 July 2014, HB Køge announced the signing of Andersen on a season-long loan from Brøndby. He quickly established himself as a regular starter and made 28 league appearances during the campaign.

=== HB Køge ===
On 30 June 2016 HB Køge confirmed, that they had signed Andersen on a permanently deal. His contract was extended in October 2016 until 2018. He left the club upon the expiration of his contract, playing 92 league games for Køge, scoring 7 goals.

=== IK Brage ===
On 23 July 2018, Andersen moved abroad for the first time in his career, signing with IK Brage in Superettan, Sweden's second tier. He left the club by mutual agreement on 28 January 2021.

=== Kolding IF ===
After leaving Brage, Andersen returned to Denmark and joined Danish 1st Division club Kolding IF on a deal for the rest of the season. The season ended with relegation to the 2nd Division for Kolding and Andersen left the club at the end of his contract.

=== NSÍ Runavík ===
In March 2022, Andersen moved to Faroese club NSÍ Runavík.

=== Hillerød ===
On 8 June 2022 it was confirmed, that Andersen had signed with newly promoted Danish 1st Division club, Hillerød Fodbold. He left the club again at the end of the year.

== Career statistics ==
As of 24 August 2014

| Club | Season | League | | | Cup | | Europa League | | Champions League | | Total | |
| Club | Season | Tier | Apps | Goals | Apps | Goals | Apps | Goals | Apps | Goals | Apps | Goals |
|---|---|---|---|---|---|---|---|---|---|---|---|---|
| Brøndby IF | 2012–13 | T1 | 4 | 0 | 0 | 0 | 0 | 0 | 0 | 0 | 4 | 0 |
| Brøndby IF | 2013–14 | T1 | 1 | 0 | 0 | 0 | 0 | 0 | 0 | 0 | 1 | 0 |
| Brøndby IF | Total | | 5 | 0 | 0 | 0 | 0 | 0 | 0 | 0 | 5 | 0 |
| HB Køge | 2014–15 | T2 | 4 | 0 | 0 | 0 | 0 | 0 | 0 | 0 | 4 | 0 |
| HB Køge | Total | | 4 | 0 | 0 | 0 | 0 | 0 | 0 | 0 | 4 | 0 |
| Career total | | | 9 | 0 | 0 | 0 | 0 | 0 | 0 | 0 | 9 | 0 |
