= Rasmus Nielsen =

Rasmus Nielsen may refer to:

- Rasmus Nielsen (footballer) (born 1987), Danish footballer
- Rasmus Nielsen (volleyballer) (born 1994), Danish volleyballer
- Rasmus Nielsen (ice hockey) (born 1990), Danish ice hockey player
- Rasmus Nielsen (squash player) (born 1983), Danish squash player
- Rasmus Nielsen (philosopher) (1809–1884), Danish philosopher and professor
- Rasmus Nielsen (biologist) (born 1970), professor of integrative biology at UC Berkeley
- Rasmus Kleis Nielsen, professor of political communication
