= Rasmus Rasmussen =

Rasmus Rasmussen may refer to:

- Rasmus Rasmussen (actor) (1862–1932), Norwegian actor, folk singer and theatre director
- Rasmus Rasmussen (merchant) (1850–1921), American merchant and businessman
- Rasmus Rasmussen (gymnast) (1899–1974), Danish gymnast
- Rasmus Rasmussen (writer) (1871–1962), Faroese folk high school teacher, writer, and independence activist
