= Jannik Skov Hansen =

Danish footballer (born 1993)

Personal information
- Date of birth: 5 January 1993 (age 33)
- Place of birth: Holme-Olstrup, Denmark
- Height: 1.75 m (5 ft 9 in)
- Position: Winger

Team information
- Current team: Gørslev
- Number: 22

Youth career
- Næstved IF
- Brøndby

Senior career*
Years	Team	Apps	(Gls)
2011–2013	Brøndby	3	(0)
2013–2016	HB Køge	26	(0)
2016	Rishøj BK		
2016	HIK	10	(1)
2017–2018	Skovshoved	14	(3)
2018–2019	Randers	1	(0)
2019	AB	9	(1)
2020	Vordingborg	8	(3)
2021	Roskilde	18	(8)
2022–2023	Holbæk B&I		
2023–2024	Ishøj		
2024–	Gørslev		

International career
2008–2009	Denmark U16	3	(0)
2009–2010	Denmark U17	12	(1)
2010	Denmark U18	3	(0)
2012	Denmark U19	1	(1)
- * Club domestic league appearances and goals as of 20:59, 22 December 2023 (UTC)

Jannik Skov Hansen (born 5 January 1993) is a Danish professional footballer who plays as a winger for Denmark Series club Ishøj.

== Club career ==
Hansen spent his early career with Brøndby and HB Køge. In July 2016, after a spell with Rishøj BK, he signed for HIK. He next played for Skovshoved before signing for Randers in January 2018. He was released by Randers in January 2019, following just one appearance and a number of injuries.

In 2019, Skov Hansen joined AB. He left the club at the end of the season. In 2020 he joined Vordingborg IF in the Denmark Series.

After a spell at FC Roskilde in 2021, Skov Hansen moved to Holbæk B&I in March 2022. In June 2023, he transferred to Ishøj IF following a departure from Holbæk due to a conflict with the management.

In 2024, Skov Hansen signed for Denmark Series club Gørslev IF.

== International career ==
Hansen represented Denmark at youth international level from under-16 to under-19 levels.

== Personal life ==
In March 2018, Hansen talked about the depression and suicidal thoughts he had experienced earlier in his career.
