= Erasmus (surname) =

Erasmus is a surname. Notable people with the surname include:

- Alan Erasmus (born 1949), British actor and co-founder of Factory Records in Manchester
- Ashley Erasmus (born 2005), South African shot putter and discus thrower
- Daniel Erasmus, South African Paralympic athlete
- Daniel Erasmus (cricketer) (born 1973), Zimbabwean cricketer
- Daniel Jacobus Erasmus (1830–1913), South African Boer politician, acting president of Transvaal between 1871 and 1872, nicknamed 'van Straat'/'van Straten'
- Daniel Jacobus Elardus Erasmus (1845-1914), Second Boer War general, nicknamed Maroela
- Douglas Erasmus (born 1990), South African swimmer
- Frans Erasmus (1896–1967), South African politician
- Georges Erasmus (born 1948), Canadian politician
- Gerhard Erasmus (born 1995), Namibian cricketer
- Jaco Erasmus (born 1979), Italian rugby union player
- Kermit Erasmus (born 1990), South African football player
- Marais Erasmus (born 1974), South African cricket umpire
- Neil Erasmus (born 2003), Australian rules footballer
- Rassie Erasmus (born 1972), South African rugby union coach and former player
