= Karen-Lisbeth Rasmussen =

Danish ceramist and designer

Karen-Lisbeth Rasmussen is a Danish ceramist and designer, born 30 June 1944 in Odense, Denmark. Raised in Randers and since the 1960s residing in Bredballe, Vejle on the east coast of the Jutland peninsula. Originally a school teacher, Karen-Lisbeth Rasmussen quit teaching when she was accepted at Kolding Kunthåndværkerskole (Kolding School of Arts and Crafts). Today the artist focusses mainly on sculptural work and the development of unique glazes. In later years Karen-Lisbeth Rasmussen has resurrected her love for teaching and initiated extensive educational activities whereby actively and successfully seeking to bridge the gap between art and industry/business. Karen-Lisbeth Rasmussen has been married since 1967 to author and children's literature expert Bent Rasmussen. They have two sons.

== Spinderihallerne - Art & Business Centre ==
One of Karen-Lisbeth Rasmussen's main accomplishments has been the transformation of Spinderihallerne in Vejle, Denmark (an abandoned cotton factory) into a respected exhibition space and artist's "commune". In 2003 the project was awarded a multimillion dollar grant from the Real Dania Foundation to completely refurbish the old cotton mill and combine the art activities with desirable office spaces, thus effectively seeking to synergize art and business activities.
