= Ole Rasmussen (footballer, born 1952) =

Danish footballer

Personal information
- Full name: Ole Bo Rasmussen
- Date of birth: 19 March 1952 (age 74)
- Place of birth: Holme-Olstrup, Denmark
- Height: 1.82 m (6 ft 0 in)
- Position: Left-back

Youth career
- –1964: Holme-Olstrup GI
- 1964–1971: Næstved

Senior career*
Years	Team	Apps	(Gls)
1971–1975	Næstved	90	(14)
1976–1980	Hertha BSC	76	(3)
1980–1981	OB	43	(6)
1981–1984	Hertha BSC	79	(2)
1984–1986	Næstved	70	(2)
Total		358	(27)

International career
1972–1975	Denmark U21	11	(1)
1975–1984	Denmark	41	(1)
- * Club domestic league appearances and goals

Ole Bo Rasmussen (born 19 March 1952) is a Danish former professional footballer, who most notably played as a left-back professionally for German club Hertha BSC. He played 41 games and scored one goal for the Denmark national football team, and represented his country at the 1984 European Championship.

== Club career ==
Born in Holme-Olstrup, Rasmussen began his senior career at club Næstved IF. He made his debut for the Denmark national team in September 1975, before he moved abroad to play professionally for Hertha BSC in the Bundesliga. He made his Hertha debut in January 1976 away against 1. FC Köln, and went on to play five seasons with the team, reaching two DFB-Pokal final as well as winning the third place in the 1977–78 Bundesliga season under head coach Kuno Klötzer. When Hertha were relegated to the 2. Bundesliga after the 1980 Bundesliga season, Rasmussen moved back to Denmark to play for OB. He played a single season at Odense, before he returned to Hertha in winter 1981, and helped the club win promotion to the Bundesliga in 1982.

Hertha were relegated once more after the 1982–83 Bundesliga season, and Rasmussen stayed with the club in the 2. Bundesliga. After the 1984 European Championship, he returned to Denmark to ended his career with Næstved IF.

== International career ==
Rasmussen was called up to represent Denmark at the 1984 European Championship, and played two of Denmark's four games before the team was eliminated in the semi-finals. He played one further Danish national team game in September 1984, bringing him to a total of 41 games and one goal for the Danish national team.

== After retirement ==
Following his retirement from football, Rasmussen became a potato farmer in Holme-Olstrup. In 2021, he openly criticised the construction of the Baltic Pipe, a natural gas pipeline, for exceeding the areas of expropriation initially agreed on.
