= Holme-Olstrup =

- Railway town
- Location in Denmark Holme-Olstrup (Denmark Region Zealand)
- Coordinates: 55°15′39″N 11°51′4″E
- Country: Denmark
- Region: Region Zealand
- Municipality: Næstved Municipality

Area
  - Urban: 1.3 km^{2} (0.50 sq mi)

Population (2026)
  - Urban: 1,265
  - Urban density: 970/km^{2} (2,500/sq mi)
  - Gender: 651 males and 614 females
- Time zone: UTC+1 (CET)
  - Summer (DST): UTC+2 (CEST)
- Postal code: DK-4684 Holmegaard

Holme-Olstrup is a small railway town between Næstved and Haslev, on the south central part of the Danish island of Zealand, at the railroad Lille Syd. It is situated in Næstved Municipality, Region Zealand and has a population of 1,265 (1 January 2026).

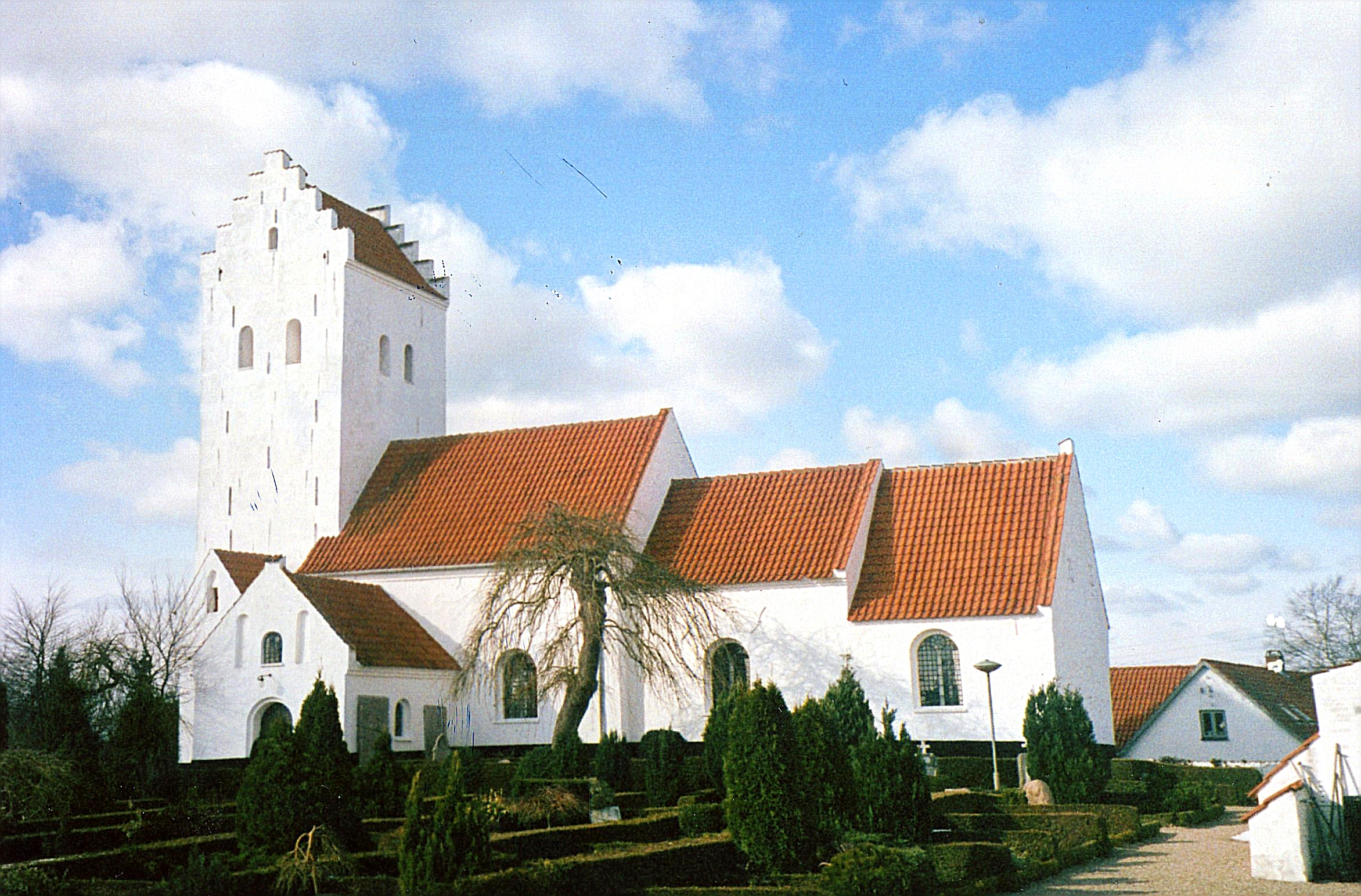
Holme-Olstrup Church, pictured from the south, February 25, 2006.

Holme-Olstrup Church, located in the southwestern part of the town, originally belonged to Holmegaard Manor.

The amusement park BonBon-Land is located on the eastern outskirts of Holme-Olstrup.

== Notable people ==
- Jannik Skov Hansen, professional footballer
