= Aaron Frederick Rasmussen Jr. =

American physician and professor

Aaron Frederick "Fred" Rasmussen Jr. (May 27, 1915, St. Anthony, Idaho – March 17, 1984, Los Angeles) was an American physician, professor of microbiology and immunology, and, later in his career, associate dean of the UCLA School of Medicine. He is known for his pioneering research in psychoneuroimmunology.

== Biography ==
He graduated in 1937 with a B.S. from the University of Idaho. At the University of Wisconsin–Madison, he graduated in 1940 with an M.S. and in 1941 with a Ph.D. in medical bacteriology. He received his M.D. in 1944 from the University of Wisconsin School of Medicine and Public Health, where he was a research associate from 1941 to 1942 and an instructor from 1942 to 1943. From 1944 to 1948 he served as an officer in the United States Army Medical Corps. From 1947 to 1948 in Washington, D.C., he was the chief of the chemotherapy research section of the department of viral and rickettsial diseases at the Army Medical Center (which in 1953 was renamed the Walter Reed Army Institute of Research).

From 1948 to 1952 at the University of Wisconsin School of Medicine and Public Health, Rasmussen was an associate professor and then a full professor of medical microbiology and preventive medicine. At the UCLA School of Medicine (now named the David Geffen School of Medicine at UCLA), he was appointed in 1952 a full professor in the Department of infectious diseases (which became the department of microbiology and immunology) and chief of the department's virology section. He chaired the department from 1962 to 1969. In 1953 he was appointed to the staff of the City of Hope Cancer Research Institute. In 1969 at the UCLA School of Medicine, he was appointed associate dean, a position he held until his sudden, unexpected death in 1984 from an acute pulmonary embolism.

Rasmussen's 1957 paper Increased susceptibility to herpes simplex in mice subjected to avoidance-Learning stress or restraint, coauthored by James T. Marsh and Norman Q. Brill, and his 1969 paper Emotion and immunity have foundational roles in psychoneuroimmunology. In the late 1950s and throughout the 1960s, Rasmussen and his colleagues investigated the effects of emotional stress in animal models for various viral infections, such as herpes simplex, Coxsackie B, vesicular stomatitis, poliomyelitis, and polyoma.

For the academic year 1960–1961, he was on sabbatical as a visiting scientist at the United States Naval Research Unit 2 in Tapei. During his sabbatical year he found that the influenza virus that caused the 1957–1958 influenza pandemic was closely related to at least 4 different influenza viruses occurring in Asia among pigs, ducks, chickens, and horses.

Rasmussen was elected in 1953 a fellow of the American Association for the Advancement of Science. He was the president of the American Society for Microbiology for the academic year 1972–1973.

In 1941 he married Besse Mabel Tatum (1913–1982). They had a son and two daughters. Their son, Frederick Tatum Rasmussen (1943–2020), became a lawyer and partner at several law firms in Seattle.

== Selected publications ==
- Rasmussen Jr., A. F.; Spencer, E. S.; Marsh, J. T. (1959). "Decrease in Susceptibility of Mice to Passive Anaphylaxis Following Avoidance-Learning Stress". Experimental Biology and Medicine. 100 (4): 878–879. doi:10.3181/00379727-100-24811. PMID 13645752. S2CID 36677372.
- Schmidt, J. R.; Rasmussen, A. F. (1960). "Activation of Latent Herpes Simplex Encephalitis by Chemical Means". The Journal of Infectious Diseases. 106 (2): 154–158. doi:10.1093/infdis/106.2.154. JSTOR 30098974. PMID 14443071.
- Marsh, James T.; Lavender, John F.; Chang, Shueh-Shen; Rasmussen Jr., A. F. (1963). "Poliomyelitis in Monkeys: Decreased Susceptibility after Avoidance Stress". Science. 140 (3574): 1414–1415. Bibcode:1963Sci...140.1414M. doi:10.1126/science.140.3574.1414. PMID 17799850. S2CID 7101917.
- Johnsson, T.; Lavender, J. F.; Hultin, E.; Rasmussen Jr., A. F. (1963). "The Influence of Avoidance-Learning Stress on Resistance to Coxsackie B Virus in Mice". Journal of Immunology. 91 (5): 569–575. doi:10.4049/jimmunol.91.5.569. PMID 14089758. S2CID 20057113.
- Jensen, M. M.; Rasmussen, A. F. (1963). "Stress and susceptibility to viral infection. I. Response of adrenals, liver, thymus, spleen and peripheral leukocyte counts to sound stress". Journal of Immunology. 90 (1): 17–20. doi:10.4049/jimmunol.90.1.17. PMID 13957640. S2CID 255643896.
- Jensen, Marcus M.; Rasmussen, A. F. (1963). "Stress and susceptibility to viral infections II. Sound stress and susceptibility to vesicular stomatitis virus". Journal of Immunology. 90 (1): 21–23. doi:10.4049/jimmunol.90.1.21. PMID 13957641. S2CID 255741423.
- Yamada, A.; Jensen, M. M.; Rasmussen Jr., A. F. (1964). "Stress and Susceptibility to Viral Infections. III. Antibody Response and Viral Retention During Avoidance Learning Stress". Experimental Biology and Medicine. 116 (3): 677–680. doi:10.3181/00379727-116-29342. PMID 14194632. S2CID 19570414.
- Chang, Shueh-Shen; Rasmussen, A. F. (1965). "Stress-induced Suppression of Interferon Production in Virus-infected Mice". Nature. 205 (4971): 623–624. Bibcode:1965Natur.205..623C. doi:10.1038/205623a0. S2CID 4169707.
- Johnsson, Torsten; Rasmussen Jr., A. Frederick (1965). "Emotional stress and susceptibility to poliomyelitis virus infection in mice". Archiv für die Gesamte Virusforschung. 17 (3–4): 392–397. doi:10.1007/BF01241193. PMID 5882819. S2CID 35408579.
- Nayak, D.P.; Rasmussen Jr., A.F. (1966). "Influence of mitomycin C on the replication of influenza viruses". Virology. 30 (4): 673–683. doi:10.1016/0042-6822(66)90172-3. PMID 5928795.
