= Rasmus Hansen (politician) =

Norwegian jurist and politician

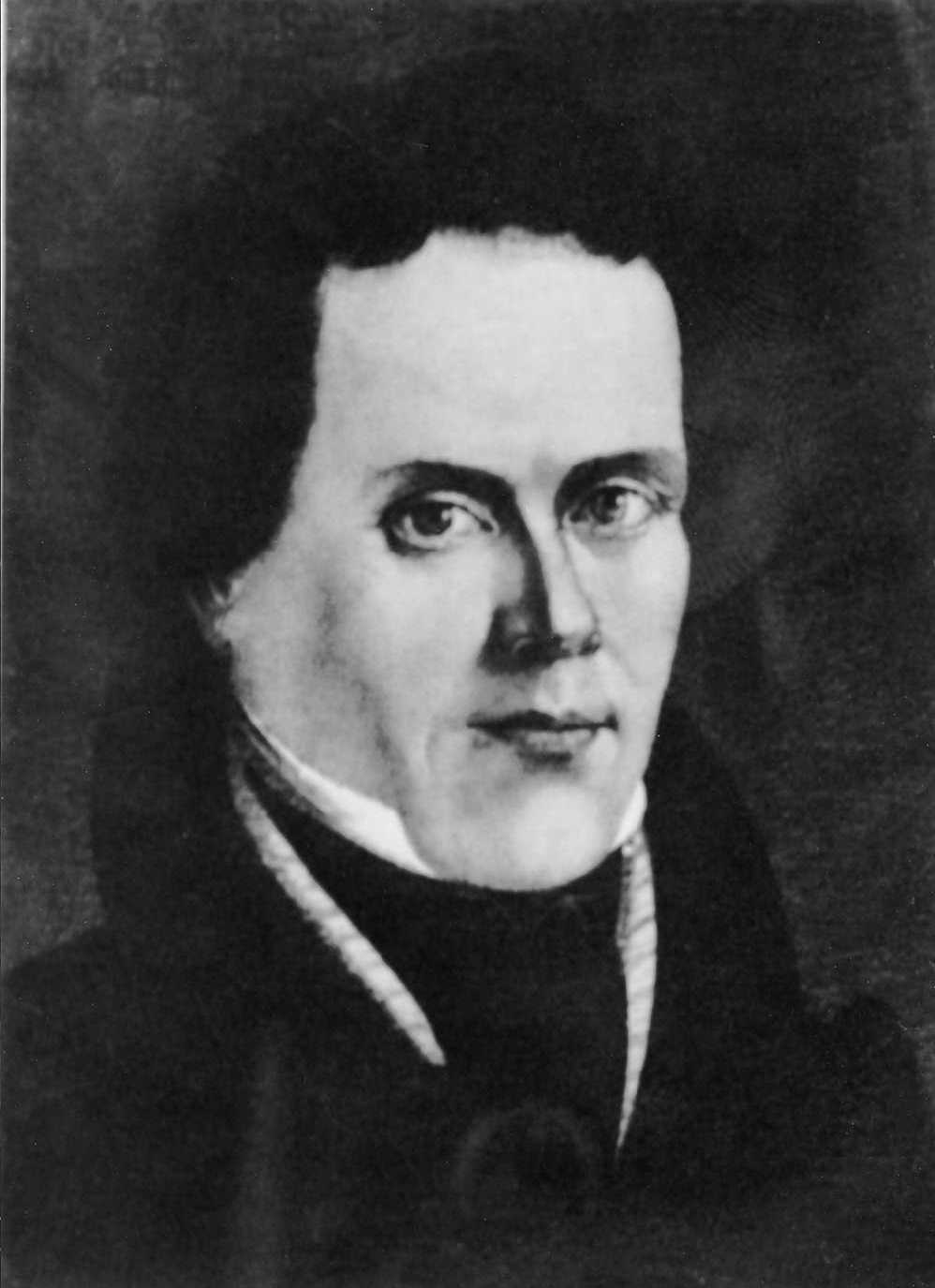

Rasmus Hansen (1797–1860s) was a Norwegian jurist and politician.

He was born in Opdal. His parents were peasants, but Rasmus Hansen studied law in Denmark. He settled in Skogn and worked as an attorney. While living here, he was an elected to the Parliament of Norway in 1839, 1842 and 1848, representing the rural constituency of Nordre Trondhjems Amt.

Around 1850 he moved from Skogn to become district stipendiary magistrate (sorenskriver) in Nord-Gudbrandsdal. He died there in the 1860s.
