= Anne Rasmussen (politician) =

Danish politician (born 1971)

Member of the Folketing
- Incumbent
- Assumed office 12 August 2021
- Constituency: Zealand

Personal details
- Born: 14 April 1971 (age 55)
- Party: Venstre

Anne Rasmussen (born 14 April 1971) is a Danish politician, who is a member of the Folketing for the Venstre political party. She entered parliament on 12 August 2021 as a replacement for Tommy Ahlers after he resigned his seat.

== Political career ==
Rasmussen ran in the 2019 Danish general election, where she received 545 votes. This was not enough for her to get elected, but she got listed 3rd on the substitute list for Venstre in the Copenhagen constituency. When Tommy Ahlers resigned his parliamentary seat on 12 August 2021, the 1st and 2nd substitutes were initially called upon to replace him in parliament. Both declined, however, which left Anne Rasmussen to take Ahlers' place in parliament.
