= Rasmus Rasmussen (gymnast) =

Danish gymnast

- Born: 26 May 1899 Viby, Kerteminde, Denmark
- Died: 11 April 1974 (aged 74) Odense, Denmark

Gymnastics career
- Discipline: Men's artistic gymnastics
- Country represented: Denmark
Medal record
Men's artistic gymnastics
Representing Denmark
Olympic Games
Silver medal – second place	1920 Antwerp	Team, Swedish system

Rasmus Rasmussen (26 May 1899 in Viby, Kerteminde Municipality, Denmark – 11 April 1974 in Odense, Denmark) was a Danish gymnast who competed in the 1920 Summer Olympics. He was part of the Danish team, which won the silver medal in the gymnastics men's team, Swedish system event in 1920.
