= Anna Rasmussen =

Danish spiritualist (1898–1983)

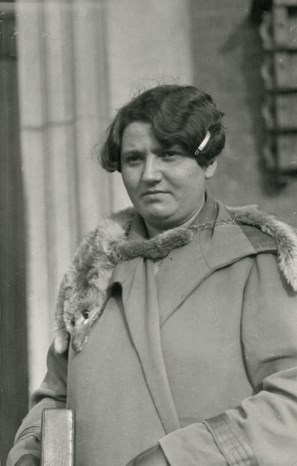
Anna Rasmussen

Anna Melloni Rasmussen (1898–1983) was a Danish spiritualist medium.

== Career ==
Rasmussen was alleged to have produced psychokinetic phenomena, such as moving pendulums in sealed glass cases. She was endorsed as genuine by the psychical researcher Harry Price. Christian Winther (1873–1968) of the Danish Society for Psychical Research investigated her mediumship, producing a favourable report in 1930. The report was later disputed as new experiments from researchers at the University of Copenhagen in 1945 suggested all her phenomena could be explained by physical causes. In 1950, Rasmussen was exposed as a fraud as a secret camera had caught her using fraudulent methods to produce spiritualist phenomena. The exposure made headlines in Danish newspapers, seriously damaging the spiritualist community in Denmark.
