= Rasmus Nielsen (footballer) =

Danish footballer (born 1987)

Personal information
- Full name: Rasmus Nielsen
- Date of birth: 14 July 1987 (age 39)
- Place of birth: Copenhagen, Denmark
- Height: 1.81 m (5 ft 11 1/2 in)
- Position: Midfielder

Senior career*
Years	Team	Apps	(Gls)
2006–2011	AB	126	(4)
2011–2014	Lyngby BK	59	(2)
2014–2016	HB Køge	68	(2)
2016–2019	AB	43	(3)
- * Club domestic league appearances and goals

Rasmus Nielsen (born 14 July 1987) is a Danish retired footballer.

He previously played in the Danish Superliga for Lyngby BK.
