= Ole Rasmussen (footballer, born 1960) =

Danish footballer and manager

Personal information
- Full name: Ole Rasmussen
- Date of birth: 3 September 1960 (age 66)
- Place of birth: Amager, Denmark
- Position: Right full back

Youth career
- Boldklubben Frem

Senior career*
Years	Team	Apps	(Gls)
1979–1989	Boldklubben Frem	218	(6)

International career
1984–1985	Denmark	2	(0)

Managerial career
- 2003–: Boldklubben Frem (reserves)
- * Club domestic league appearances and goals

Ole Rasmussen (born 3 September 1960) is a Danish football manager and former player, currently managing the Boldklubben Frem reserves.

Rasmussen won national fame when he scored a spectacular own goal in the 1981 Danish Cup final.
