= Herfølge Stadium =

Football stadium in Herfølge, Køge, Denmark

- Interactive map of Herfølge Stadium
- Full name: Herfølge Stadion
- Former names: Herfølge Stadion (1936–present); SEAS-NVE Park (2009–2016); Cactus Park (2016–2018); Capelli Sport Stadion (2018)
- Location: Vordingborgvej 124; 4681 Herfølge
- Coordinates: 55°24′49″N 12°08′03″E
- Owner: Køge Municipality
- Capacity: 8,000 (3,440 seatings)
- Surface: Natural grass
- Record attendance: 8,172 (Herfølge BK vs. Brøndby IF, 15 June 1997)
- Field size: 105 by 65 metres (114.8 yd × 71.1 yd)

Construction
- Opened: 1936; 90 years ago
- Renovated: 2018
- Expanded: 1942, 1986, 1999

Tenants
- Herfølge BK (1936–present); HB Køge (2009–2018)

External images
- View from the stadium's north-east corner
- View from the north-west towards lounge.
- View of the stadium's north stand.
- Map of stadium and surrounding area.

Herfølge Stadium (Danish: Herfølge Stadion) is an association football stadium located in Herfølge, Køge municipality, Denmark. It has been the home ground of Herfølge BK (HB) since 1936 and has previously hosted the professional superstructure HB Køge (2009–2018). In November 2018, the total capacity of 8,000 spectators (with 3,440 seatings) made it among the 25th largest football stadiums in Denmark.

Both the land, on which the stadium is located, and the related buildings have since December 2009 been fully owned by Køge Municipality. Due to sponsorship arrangements with commercial companies, the stadium has been known under three previous names, SEAS-NVE Park (2009–2016), Cactus Park (2016–2018) and Capelli Sport Stadion (2018).

The stadium's current attendance record of 8,172 spectators dates back to a 1996–97 Danish Superliga match on 17 June 1997, when Herfølge BK lost 2–1 against Brøndby IF. The stadium has hosted one European Cup match on 9 August 2000, when the Danish league champions Herfølge BK played at home against the Scottish league champions Rangers F.C. in the third qualifying round of the 2000–01 UEFA Champions League.

== History ==
A naked football field at the current venue was inaugurated in 1936 after Herfølge BK had relocated to their new home within the rural village. In 1937, the local municipality constructed the actual outlines of the current stadium, which was later expanded to include an exhibition field and a training ground and two handball fields. In 1942, the Herfølge-based club built a club house including two changing rooms and a bath for its members, at the ground, at a cost of DKK 10,000.

Under the leadership of the late Gudmund Jørgensen, the training facilities and the exhibition ground was renovated and expanded in the late 1970s to be able to house the professional department of Herfølge BK, which occurred in advance of the club's promotion to the top league in Denmark in 1980. The stadium's first proper grandstand with seatings, a traditional single tier, was constructed along the western long section in 1986 at a cost of approx. DKK 6 million, which was privately funded after the local municipality would not make the investment, but instead gave the club a 50-year rights of usage-agreement for the exhibition field at the stadium. Following the expansion, the stadium capacity was increased to hold 6,000 spectators and the stadium's attendance record was increased from 3.464 spectators (Herfølge BK vs. Køge BK on 10 June 1981) to 5.348 spectators (Herfølge BK vs. Brøndby IF on 4 September 1988). The name Herfølge was visually written on the seats (in the club's colour scheme with blue letters on a yellow background) on the western grand stand until the seats were switched to blue and black stripes during the HB Køge-era at the stadium – the north stand was left untouched in blue and yellow stripes. The previous cement steps located in the north end behind one of the goal posts were replaced by a new modern grand stand in the late 1990s, inaugurated in the fall of 1999, at a cost of DKK 13 million by a group of eight investors under the company Herfølge Tribune, with the intention of giving the successful first team of Herfølge BK better ground conditions, and then rented back to the professional department, Herfølge Boldklub A/S.

The north end stand included office space for the administration and 600 square metres of facilities for the players. All the buildings were sold for DKK 12.3 million including the associated debt to the local municipality in December 2009. With the completion of the most recent area of the stadium, the stadium now seats 3,440 attendees (1,740 spectators at the west stands and 1,700 spectators at the north stands), with shallow open standing-only terraces for an additional 4,560 spectators in the east section and south section (traditionally reserved for the away followings of visiting teams). The upper east section includes 2 rows of seats and a VIP lounge/executive boxes (on stilts) on the first floor competing for space with a sport centre hall in the lower east section. In 2018, the club house of Herfølge BK located in the eastern section was renovated with 10 changing rooms and 2 new changing rooms was added.

== Name, sponsorships and logos ==
The ground has been known under several names due to sponsorship arrangements; SEAS-NVE Park (8 July 2009 – 10 May 2016), Cactus Park (11 May 2016 – 28 February 2018) and Capelli Sport Stadion (1 March 2018 – 30 November 2018), when the naming rights for HB Køge's football matches and events were acquired by different companies. The stadium's previous sponsor name, Capelli Sport Stadium, was discontinued after the last match in 2018 involving the then-1st Division team HB Køge and instead transferred to the club's new home ground, Køge Idrætspark, in February 2019.

Logos used for the naming rights agreements of Herfølge Stadium:

SEAS-NVE Park
(2009–2016)
Sponsor: SEAS-NVE

Cactus Park
(2016–2018)
Sponsor: The Whole Company

Capelli Sport Stadion
(2018)
Sponsor: Capelli Sport
