= List of English football transfers winter 2015–16 =

The 2015–16 winter transfer window for English football transfers opened on 1 January and closed on 1 February 2016. Additionally, players without a club could join at any time, clubs could sign players on loan at any time, and clubs could sign a goalkeeper on an emergency loan if they had no registered goalkeeper available. This list includes transfers featuring at least one Premier League or Championship club which were completed after the end of the summer 2015 transfer window and before the end of the 2015–16 winter window.

== Transfers ==
All clubs without a flag are English. Note that while Cardiff City, Swansea City and Newport County are affiliated with the Football Association of Wales and thus take the Welsh flag, they play in the English football league system, and so their transfers are included here.

| Date | Name | Moving from | Moving to | Fee |
|---|---|---|---|---|
| 1 October 2015 | (England) John Swift | Chelsea | Brentford | Loan |
| 9 October 2015 | (Italy) Marco Amelia | Unattached | Chelsea | Free |
| 19 October 2015 | (England) Joe Cole | Aston Villa | Coventry City | Loan |
| 26 October 2015 | (Australia) Luke Brattan | Unattached | Manchester City | Free |
| 26 October 2015 | (Australia) Luke Brattan | Manchester City | Bolton Wanderers | Loan |
| 29 October 2015 | (Saint Lucia) Janoi Donacien | Aston Villa | (Wales) Newport County | Loan |
| 19 November 2015 | (England) Ben Chilwell | Leicester City | Huddersfield Town | Loan |
| 19 November 2015 | (England) Joe Dodoo | Leicester City | Bury | Loan |
| 19 November 2015 | (Portugal) Joel Castro Pereira | Manchester United | Rochdale | Loan |
| 23 November 2015 | (England) Jack Stacey | Reading | Barnet | Loan |
| 23 November 2015 | (Scotland) Tony Watt | Charlton Athletic | (Wales) Cardiff City | Loan |
| 24 November 2015 | (Canada) Doneil Henry | West Ham United | Blackburn Rovers | Loan |
| 24 November 2015 | (England) Kieran O'Hara | Manchester United | Stockport County | Loan |
| 24 November 2015 | (Norway) Martin Samuelsen | West Ham United | Peterborough United | Loan |
| 25 November 2015 | (Republic of Ireland) Kenny McEvoy | Tottenham Hotspur | York City | Loan |
| 26 November 2015 | (Scotland) Liam Bridcutt | Sunderland | Leeds United | Loan |
| 26 November 2015 | (Wales) Michael Crowe | Ipswich Town | Stevenage | Loan |
| 26 November 2015 | (England) Josh Emmanuel | Ipswich Town | Crawley Town | Loan |
| 26 November 2015 | (Wales) Jordan Evans | Fulham | Oxford United | Loan |
| 26 November 2015 | (England) James Ferry | Brentford | Wycombe Wanderers | Loan |
| 26 November 2015 | (England) Bradley Fewster | Middlesbrough | York City | Loan |
| 26 November 2015 | (England) Anton Forrester | Blackburn Rovers | Morecambe | Loan |
| 26 November 2015 | (England) Greg Halford | Rotherham United | Birmingham City | Loan |
| 26 November 2015 | (Scotland) Dominic Hyam | Reading | Basingstoke Town | Loan |
| 26 November 2015 | (England) Luke Hyam | Ipswich Town | Rotherham United | Loan |
| 26 November 2015 | (Northern Ireland) Jordan Jones | Middlesbrough | Cambridge United | Loan |
| 26 November 2015 | (England) Mark Kitching | Middlesbrough | York City | Loan |
| 26 November 2015 | (England) Elliot Lee | West Ham United | Blackpool | Loan |
| 26 November 2015 | (England) Jordan Lussey | Bolton Wanderers | York City | Loan |
| 26 November 2015 | (England) Christian Maghoma | Tottenham Hotspur | Yeovil Town | Loan |
| 26 November 2015 | (Scotland) Chris Maguire | Rotherham United | Oxford United | Loan |
| 26 November 2015 | (Scotland) Oli McBurnie | (Wales) Swansea City | (Wales) Newport County | Loan |
| 26 November 2015 | (United States) Andrija Novakovich | Reading | Cheltenham Town | Loan |
| 26 November 2015 | (England) Stefan O'Connor | Arsenal | York City | Loan |
| 26 November 2015 | (Republic of Ireland) John O'Sullivan | Blackburn Rovers | Rochdale | Loan |
| 26 November 2015 | (England) Jed Steer | Aston Villa | Huddersfield Town | Loan |
| 26 November 2015 | (England) Jermaine Udumaga | Brentford | Wycombe Wanderers | Loan |
| 26 November 2015 | (England) James Vaughan | Huddersfield Town | Birmingham City | Loan |
| 26 November 2015 | (Netherlands) Rajiv van La Parra | Wolverhampton Wanderers | Brighton & Hove Albion | Loan |
| 26 November 2015 | (England) Elliott Ward | Bournemouth | Huddersfield Town | Loan |
| 26 November 2015 | (England) James Wilson | Manchester United | Brighton & Hove Albion | Loan |
| 27 November 2015 | (England) Simon Lenigham | Unattached | Rotherham United | Free |
| 30 November 2015^{[b]} | (Republic of Ireland) Richie Towell | (Republic of Ireland) Dundalk | Brighton & Hove Albion | Undisclosed |
| 1 December 2015 | (Australia) Joshua Wallen | (Australia) Palm Beach | Queens Park Rangers | Free |
| 5 December 2015 | (Mexico) Ulises Dávila | Chelsea | (Mexico) Santos Laguna | Undisclosed |
| 18 December 2015 | (England) Luke Varney | Unattached | Ipswich Town | Free |
| 24 December 2015^{[a]} | (England) Matt Jarvis | West Ham United | Norwich City | Undisclosed |
| 24 December 2015^{[a]} | (Poland) Michał Żyro | (Poland) Legia Warsaw | Wolverhampton Wanderers | Undisclosed |
| 30 December 2015^{[a]} | (England) Liam Ridgewell | (United States) Portland Timbers | Brighton & Hove Albion | Loan |
| 31 December 2015 | (England) Sam Johnstone | Manchester United | Preston North End | Loan |
| 1 January 2016 | (Argentina) Juan Iturbe | (Italy) Roma | Bournemouth | Loan |
| 2 January 2016 | (England) Tahvon Campbell | West Bromwich Albion | Yeovil Town | Loan |
| 2 January 2016 | (England) Paul Digby | Barnsley | Ipswich Town | Loan |
| 2 January 2016 | (England) Matthew Foulds | Bury | Everton | Undisclosed |
| 2 January 2016 | (Antigua and Barbuda) Calaum Jahraldo-Martin | Hull City | Leyton Orient | Loan |
| 2 January 2016 | (England) Lewis Page | West Ham United | Cambridge United | Loan |
| 2 January 2016 | (Scotland) Murray Wallace | Huddersfield Town | Scunthorpe United | Undisclosed |
| 2 January 2016 | (Australia) Rhys Williams | Middlesbrough | Charlton Athletic | Loan |
| 2 January 2016 | (England) Lawrie Wilson | Bolton Wanderers | Peterborough United | Loan |
| 3 January 2016 | (England) Randell Williams | Tower Hamlets | Crystal Palace | Free |
| 4 January 2016 | (Guinea) Abdoul Camara | (France) Angers | Derby County | £1.25m |
| 4 January 2016 | (England) Demarai Gray | Birmingham City | Leicester City | £3.7m |
| 4 January 2016 | (England) Roger Johnson | Unattached | Charlton Athletic | Free |
| 4 January 2016 | (Uruguay) Diego Poyet | West Ham United | Charlton Athletic | Loan |
| 5 January 2016 | (England) Elliott Bennett | Norwich City | Blackburn Rovers | Undisclosed |
| 5 January 2016 | (England) Darnell Furlong | Queens Park Rangers | Cambridge United | Loan |
| 5 January 2016 | (Scotland) Jack Grimmer | Fulham | Shrewsbury Town | Loan |
| 5 January 2016 | (Trinidad and Tobago) Kenwyne Jones | (Wales) Cardiff City | (United Arab Emirates) Al Jazira | Loan |
| 5 January 2016 | (Republic of Ireland) Kenny McEvoy | Tottenham Hotspur | York City | Free |
| 5 January 2016 | (England) Callum Robinson | Aston Villa | Preston North End | Loan |
| 6 January 2016 | (England) Nick Blackman | Reading | Derby County | £2.5m |
| 6 January 2016 | (Jamaica) Simon Dawkins | Derby County | (United States) San Jose Earthquakes | Undisclosed |
| 6 January 2016 | (Serbia) Marko Grujić | (Serbia) Red Star Belgrade | Liverpool | £5.1m |
| 6 January 2016 | (Serbia) Marko Grujić | Liverpool | (Serbia) Red Star Belgrade | Loan |
| 6 January 2016 | (Republic of Ireland) Michael Harriman | Queens Park Rangers | Wycombe Wanderers | Undisclosed |
| 6 January 2016 | (England) Conor Townsend | Hull City | Scunthorpe United | Free |
| 6 January 2016 | (England) Liam Walsh | Everton | Yeovil Town | Loan |
| 7 January 2016 | (England) Joe Cole | Aston Villa | Coventry City | Free |
| 7 January 2016 | (England) Ashley Fletcher | Manchester United | Barnsley | Loan |
| 7 January 2016 | (England) Luke Hendrie | Burnley | York City | Loan |
| 7 January 2016 | (England) Jake Kean | Norwich City | Colchester United | Loan |
| 7 January 2016 | (Germany) Jan Kirchhoff | (Germany) Bayern Munich | Sunderland | £1m |
| 7 January 2016 | (France) Anthony Knockaert | (Belgium) Standard Liège | Brighton & Hove Albion | Undisclosed |
| 7 January 2016 | (Republic of Ireland) Ian Lawlor | Manchester City | Bury | Loan |
| 7 January 2016 | (England) Ollie Muldoon | Charlton Athletic | Dagenham & Redbridge | Loan |
| 7 January 2016 | (Switzerland) Shani Tarashaj | (Switzerland) Grasshoppers | Everton | Undisclosed |
| 7 January 2016 | (Switzerland) Shani Tarashaj | Everton | (Switzerland) Grasshoppers | Loan |
| 7 January 2016 | (Brazil) Wallace | Chelsea | (Brazil) Grêmio | Loan |
| 8 January 2016 | (Tunisia) Aymen Belaïd | (Bulgaria) Levski Sofia | Rotherham United | Free |
| 8 January 2016 | (England) Alex Cairns | Unattached | Rotherham United | Free |
| 8 January 2016 | (The Gambia) Mustapha Carayol | Middlesbrough | Leeds United | Loan |
| 8 January 2016 | (England) Jake Forster-Caskey | Brighton & Hove Albion | Milton Keynes Dons | Loan |
| 8 January 2016 | (England) Gary Gardner | Aston Villa | Nottingham Forest | Loan |
| 8 January 2016 | (England) James Husband | Middlesbrough | Huddersfield Town | Loan |
| 8 January 2016 | (Slovenia) Bojan Jokić | (Spain) Villarreal | Nottingham Forest | Loan |
| 8 January 2016 | (Curaçao) Darryl Lachman | Sheffield Wednesday | (Netherlands) Cambuur | Loan |
| 8 January 2016 | (Portugal) Ivo Pinto | (Croatia) Dinamo Zagreb | Norwich City | Undisclosed |
| 8 January 2016 | (England) Jed Wallace | Wolverhampton Wanderers | Millwall | Loan |
| 8 January 2016 | (England) Joe Worrall | Nottingham Forest | Dagenham & Redbridge | Loan |
| 9 January 2016 | (England) Joe Davis | Leicester City | Fleetwood Town | Loan |
| 9 January 2016 | (Netherlands) Yanic Wildschut | Middlesbrough | Wigan Athletic | Undisclosed |
| 10 January 2016 | (England) Benik Afobe | Wolverhampton Wanderers | Bournemouth | £10m |
| 11 January 2016 | (Scotland) Kyle Cameron | Newcastle United | York City | Loan |
| 11 January 2016 | (England) Joe Davis | Leicester City | Fleetwood Town | Undisclosed |
| 11 January 2016 | (England) Lewis Grabban | Norwich City | Bournemouth | £7m |
| 11 January 2016 | (Scotland) Jack McKay | Doncaster Rovers | Leeds United | Undisclosed |
| 11 January 2016 | (Scotland) Paul McKay | Doncaster Rovers | Leeds United | Undisclosed |
| 11 January 2016 | (England) Ben Pearson | Manchester United | Preston North End | Undisclosed |
| 11 January 2016 | (Senegal) Henri Saivet | (France) Bordeaux | Newcastle United | Undisclosed |
| 11 January 2016 | (England) Jayden Stockley | Bournemouth | Exeter City | Loan |
| 12 January 2016 | (England) Steven Caulker | Queens Park Rangers | Liverpool | Loan |
| 12 January 2016 | (England) Dean Henderson | Manchester United | Stockport County | Loan |
| 12 January 2016 | (England) Ntumba Massanka | Burnley | York City | Loan |
| 12 January 2016 | (England) Richard O'Donnell | Wigan Athletic | Bristol City | Loan |
| 12 January 2016 | (England) Kieran O'Hara | Manchester United | Morecambe | Loan |
| 12 January 2016 | (England) Will Randall | Swindon Town | Wolverhampton Wanderers | Undisclosed |
| 12 January 2016 | (England) Jonjo Shelvey | (Wales) Swansea City | Newcastle United | £12m |
| 13 January 2016 | (England) Jack Hunt | Crystal Palace | Sheffield Wednesday | Undisclosed |
| 13 January 2016 | (England) Shilow Tracey | Ebbsfleet United | Tottenham Hotspur | Undisclosed |
| 13 January 2016 | (Scotland) Conor McGrandles | Norwich City | (Scotland) Falkirk | Loan |
| 13 January 2016 | (Norway) Jonathan Parr | Ipswich Town | (Norway) Strømsgodset | Free |
| 14 January 2016 | (Poland) Hubert Adamczyk | Chelsea | (Poland) Cracovia | Free |
| 14 January 2016 | (England) Will Aimson | Hull City | Blackpool | Undisclosed |
| 14 January 2016 | (Burundi) Gaël Bigirimana | Newcastle United | Coventry City | Loan |
| 14 January 2016 | (England) Josh Brownhill | Preston North End | Barnsley | Loan |
| 14 January 2016 | (Egypt) Mohamed Elneny | (Switzerland) Basel | Arsenal | Undisclosed |
| 14 January 2016 | (England) Harry Hickford | Milton Keynes Dons | Dagenham & Redbridge | Loan |
| 14 January 2016 | (Senegal) Dame N'Doye | (Turkey) Trabzonspor | Sunderland | Loan |
| 14 January 2016 | (Norway) Sondre Tronstad | Huddersfield Town | (Norway) Haugesund | Undisclosed |
| 15 January 2016 | (England) Mason Bennett | Derby County | Burton Albion | Loan |
| 15 January 2016 | (England) Will Buckley | Sunderland | Birmingham City | Loan |
| 15 January 2016 | (Australia) Anthony Cáceres | (Australia) Central Coast Mariners | Manchester City | Undisclosed |
| 15 January 2016 | (Australia) Anthony Cáceres | Manchester City | (Australia) Melbourne City | Loan |
| 15 January 2016 | (England) Mitchell Beeney | Chelsea | Newport County | Loan |
| 15 January 2016 | (England) Matty Dixon | Hull City | York City | Free |
| 15 January 2016 | (England) Michael Doughty | Queens Park Rangers | Swindon Town | Loan |
| 15 January 2016 | (England) Ben Godfrey | York City | Norwich City | Undisclosed |
| 15 January 2016 | (Scotland) Stephen Hendrie | West Ham United | Southend United | Loan |
| 15 January 2016 | (Canada) Simeon Jackson | Unattached | Blackburn Rovers | Free |
| 15 January 2016 | (Republic of Ireland) John O'Sullivan | Blackburn Rovers | Bury | Loan |
| 15 January 2016 | (Sierra Leone) Alie Sesay | Leicester City | Barnet | Undisclosed |
| 15 January 2016 | (Spain) Kike Sola | (Spain) Athletic Bilbao | Middlesbrough | Loan |
| 16 January 2016 | (England) Karlan Ahearne-Grant | Charlton Athletic | Cambridge United | Loan |
| 16 January 2016 | (England) Charlie Austin | Queens Park Rangers | Southampton | £4m |
| 16 January 2016 | (Spain) Jota | Brentford | (Spain) Eibar | Loan |
| 18 January 2016 | (Morocco) Nordin Amrabat | (Spain) Málaga | Watford | Undisclosed |
| 18 January 2016 | (England) Liam Grimshaw | Manchester United | Preston North End | Undisclosed |
| 18 January 2016 | (Switzerland) Timm Klose | (Germany) VfL Wolfsburg | Norwich City | Undisclosed |
| 18 January 2016 | (England) Elliot Lee | West Ham United | Colchester United | Loan |
| 19 January 2016 | (England) Joe Bennett | Aston Villa | Sheffield Wednesday | Loan |
| 19 January 2016 | (England) George Evans | Manchester City | Reading | Undisclosed |
| 19 January 2016 | (England) Ben Gladwin | Queens Park Rangers | Bristol City | Loan |
| 19 January 2016 | (England) Luke Maxwell | Kidderminster Harriers | Birmingham City | £75,000 |
| 19 January 2016 | (England) Jeffrey Monakana | Brighton & Hove Albion | (Romania) Voluntari | Free |
| 19 January 2016 | (Scotland) Steven Naismith | Everton | Norwich City | £8.5m |
| 19 January 2016 | (Romania) Costel Pantilimon | Sunderland | Watford | Undisclosed |
| 19 January 2016 | (Republic of Ireland) Alex Pearce | Derby County | Bristol City | Loan |
| 19 January 2016 | (Portugal) Jorge Teixeira | (Belgium) Standard Liège | Charlton Athletic | Undisclosed |
| 19 January 2016 | (England) Conor Washington | Peterborough United | Queens Park Rangers | Undisclosed |
| 20 January 2016 | (England) Sam Byram | Leeds United | West Ham United | Undisclosed |
| 20 January 2016 | (Spain) José Ángel Crespo | Aston Villa | (Spain) Rayo Vallecano | Loan |
| 20 January 2016 | (England) Danny Graham | Sunderland | Blackburn Rovers | Loan |
| 20 January 2016 | (France) Yann Kermorgant | Bournemouth | Reading | Undisclosed |
| 20 January 2016 | (Croatia) Andrej Kramarić | Leicester City | (Germany) TSG 1899 Hoffenheim | Loan |
| 20 January 2016 | (Algeria) Karim Matmour | Unattached | Huddersfield Town | Free |
| 20 January 2016 | (England) Luke Thomas | Cheltenham Town | Derby County | Undisclosed |
| 20 January 2016 | (England) Lewis Walker | Ilkeston | Derby County | Undisclosed |
| 20 January 2016 | (England) Elliott Ward | Bournemouth | Blackburn Rovers | Undisclosed |
| 21 January 2016 | (Argentina) Luciano Becchio | Unattached | Rotherham United | Free |
| 21 January 2016 | (Montserrat) Brandon Comley | Queens Park Rangers | Carlisle United | Loan |
| 21 January 2016 | (Senegal) Papy Djilobodji | Chelsea | (Germany) Werder Bremen | Loan |
| 21 January 2016 | (United States) Lynden Gooch | Sunderland | Doncaster Rovers | Loan |
| 21 January 2016 | (England) Uche Ikpeazu | Watford | Blackpool | Loan |
| 21 January 2016 | (England) Alex Kiwomya | Chelsea | Fleetwood Town | Loan |
| 21 January 2016 | (England) Sam McQueen | Southampton | Southend United | Loan |
| 21 January 2016 | (England) Harry Toffolo | Norwich City | Peterborough United | Loan |
| 21 January 2016 | (England) Adil Nabi | West Bromwich Albion | Peterborough United | Undisclosed |
| 21 January 2016 | (Netherlands) Lex Immers | (Netherlands) Feyenoord | (Wales) Cardiff City | Loan |
| 22 January 2016 | (Argentina) Mauro Zárate | West Ham United | (Italy) Fiorentina | £3m |
| 22 January 2016 | (England) Shaq Coulthirst | Tottenham Hotspur | Peterborough United | Undisclosed |
| 22 January 2016 | (England) Gary Hooper | Norwich City | Sheffield Wednesday | Undisclosed |
| 22 January 2016 | (Republic of Ireland) Kevin Foley | Unattached | Ipswich Town | Free |
| 22 January 2016 | (England) Luke Wilkinson | Ipswich Town | Luton Town | Undisclosed |
| 22 January 2016 | (Scotland) Chris Burke | Nottingham Forest | Rotherham United | Loan |
| 22 January 2016 | (Wales) Jonny Williams | Crystal Palace | Milton Keynes Dons | Loan |
| 22 January 2016 | (Ghana) Daniel Amartey | (Denmark) Copenhagen | Leicester City | £5m |
| 22 January 2016 | (England) Steve Harper | Unattached | Sunderland | Free |
| 23 January 2016 | (England) Paris Cowan-Hall | Millwall | Wycombe Wanderers | Loan |
| 23 January 2016 | (Republic of Ireland) Sean Kavanagh | Fulham | Mansfield Town | Loan |
| 23 January 2016 | (Denmark) Anders Lindegaard | West Bromwich Albion | Preston North End | Loan |
| 23 January 2016 | (Lithuania) Deimantas Petravičius | Nottingham Forest | Stevenage | Loan |
| 23 January 2016 | (England) Offrande Zanzala | Derby County | Stevenage | Loan |
| 24 January 2016 | (Spain) Víctor Valdés | Manchester United | (Belgium) Standard Liège | Loan |
| 25 January 2016 | (England) Steve Sidwell | Stoke City | Brighton & Hove Albion | Loan |
| 25 January 2016 | (Scotland) Matthew Kennedy | (Wales) Cardiff City | Port Vale | Loan |
| 25 January 2016 | (France) Eddy Lecygne | Stoke City | Doncaster Rovers | Loan |
| 25 January 2016 | (France) Toumani Diagouraga | Brentford | Leeds United | Undisclosed |
| 25 January 2016 | (Wales) Jake Taylor | Reading | Exeter City | Free |
| 26 January 2016 | (Togo) Emmanuel Adebayor | Unattached | Crystal Palace | Free |
| 26 January 2016 | (Ghana) Christian Atsu | Chelsea | (Spain) Málaga | Loan |
| 26 January 2016 | (England) Shane Ferguson | Newcastle United | Millwall | Undisclosed |
| 26 January 2016 | (Republic of Ireland) Anthony Gerrard | Shrewsbury Town | Oldham Athletic | Free |
| 26 January 2016 | (Sweden) Marcus Olsson | Blackburn Rovers | Derby County | Undisclosed |
| 26 January 2016 | (England) Paul Robinson | Unattached | Burnley | Free |
| 26 January 2016 | (Portugal) Orlando Sá | Reading | (Israel) Maccabi Tel Aviv | Undisclosed |
| 26 January 2016 | (Australia) Adam Taggart | Fulham | (Australia) Perth Glory | Undisclosed |
| 27 January 2016 | (Norway) Henrik Bjørdal | (Norway) Aalesund | Brighton & Hove Albion | Undisclosed |
| 27 January 2016 | (England) Adam Chicksen | Brighton & Hove Albion | Gillingham | Loan |
| 27 January 2016 | (Italy) Diego Fabbrini | Watford | Birmingham City | £1.5m |
| 27 January 2016 | (England) Jonjoe Kenny | Everton | Oxford United | Loan |
| 27 January 2016 | (Ivory Coast) Lamine Koné | (France) Lorient | Sunderland | Undisclosed |
| 27 January 2016 | (Republic of Ireland) Shane Lowry | Birmingham City | (Australia) Perth Glory | Free |
| 27 January 2016 | (Brazil) Ramires | Chelsea | (China) Jiangsu Suning | £25m |
| 27 January 2016 | (Scotland) Andrew Shinnie | Birmingham City | Rotherham United | Loan |
| 27 January 2016 | (England) Lee Tomlin | Bournemouth | Bristol City | Loan |
| 27 January 2016 | (England) Andros Townsend | Tottenham Hotspur | Newcastle United | Undisclosed |
| 28 January 2016 | (England) Scott Golbourne | Wolverhampton Wanderers | Bristol Rovers | Undisclosed |
| 28 January 2016 | (England) Joe Pigott | Charlton Athletic | Luton Town | Loan |
| 28 January 2016 | (England) Luke Prosser | Southend United | Northampton Town | Loan |
| 28 January 2016 | (England) Bryn Morris | Middlesbrough | Walsall | Loan |
| 28 January 2016 | (Uruguay) Sebastián Coates | Sunderland | (Portugal) Sporting Lisbon | Loan |
| 28 January 2016 | (Germany) Gerhard Tremmel | (Wales) Swansea City | (Germany) Werder Bremen | Loan |
| 28 January 2016 | (England) James Ferry | Brentford | Welling United | Loan |
| 28 January 2016 | (Lithuania) Giedrius Arlauskis | Watford | (Spain) Espanyol | Loan |
| 28 January 2016 | (Latvia) Deniss Rakels | (Poland) Cracovia | Reading | Undisclosed |
| 29 January 2016 | (Denmark) Daniel Iversen | (Denmark) Esbjerg fB | Leicester City | Undisclosed |
| 29 January 2016 | (Saint Kitts and Nevis) Harry Panayiotou | Leicester City | (Scotland) Raith Rovers | Loan |
| 29 January 2016 | (England) Mike Williamson | Newcastle United | Wolverhampton Wanderers | Undisclosed |
| 29 January 2016 | (England) Wes Thomas | Birmingham City | Bradford City | Loan |
| 29 January 2016 | (Scotland) Tony Watt | Charlton Athletic | Blackburn Rovers | Loan |
| 29 January 2016 | (Italy) Alberto Paloschi | (Italy) Chievo Verona | (Wales) Swansea City | Undisclosed |
| 29 January 2016 | (Brazil) Alexandre Pato | (Brazil) Corinthians | Chelsea | Loan |
| 29 January 2016 | (Belgium) Charly Musonda | Chelsea | (Spain) Real Betis | Loan |
| 29 January 2016 | (Slovakia) Ľubomír Šatka | Newcastle United | York City | Loan |
| 29 January 2016 | (England) Lee Cox | Plymouth Argyle | Stevenage | Free |
| 29 January 2016 | (Brazil) Sandro | Queens Park Rangers | West Bromwich Albion | Loan |
| 30 January 2016 | (Spain) Mario Suárez | (Italy) Fiorentina | Watford | Undisclosed |
| 30 January 2016 | (England) Patrick Bamford | Chelsea | Norwich City | Loan |
| 30 January 2016 | (United States) Matt Miazga | (United States) New York Red Bulls | Chelsea | Undisclosed |
| 30 January 2016 | (Tunisia) Wahbi Khazri | (France) Bordeaux | Sunderland | Undisclosed |
| 31 January 2016 | (France) Florian Thauvin | Newcastle United | (France) Marseille | Loan |
| 31 January 2016 | (Nigeria) Emmanuel Emenike | (Turkey) Fenerbahçe | West Ham United | Loan |
| 1 February 2016 | (Republic of Ireland) Aiden McGeady | Everton | Sheffield Wednesday | Loan |
| 1 February 2016 | (France) Mathieu Debuchy | Arsenal | (France) Bordeaux | Loan |
| 1 February 2016 | (Scotland) Steven Fletcher | Sunderland | (France) Marseille | Loan |
| 1 February 2016 | (Portugal) Éder | (Wales) Swansea City | (France) Lille | Loan |
| 1 February 2016 | (France) Gianelli Imbula | (Portugal) Porto | Stoke City | £18.3m |
| 1 February 2016 | (Netherlands) Marco van Ginkel | Chelsea | (Netherlands) PSV Eindhoven | Loan |
| 1 February 2016 | (France) Yaya Sanogo | Arsenal | Charlton Athletic | Loan |
| 1 February 2016 | (Netherlands) Leroy Fer | Queens Park Rangers | (Wales) Swansea City | Loan |
| 1 February 2016 | (England) Patrick Roberts | Manchester City | (Scotland) Celtic | Loan |
| 1 February 2016 | (Argentina) Federico Fazio | Tottenham Hotspur | (Spain) Sevilla | Loan |
| 1 February 2016 | (Ivory Coast) Seydou Doumbia | (Italy) Roma | Newcastle United | Loan |
| 1 February 2016 | (England) Alex Pritchard | Tottenham Hotspur | West Bromwich Albion | Loan |
| 1 February 2016 | (Wales) Rhoys Wiggins | Sheffield Wednesday | Bournemouth | Undisclosed |
| 1 February 2016 | (France) Abdoulaye Doucouré | (France) Stade Rennais | Watford | £8m |
| 1 February 2016 | (France) Abdoulaye Doucouré | Watford | (Spain) Granada | Loan |
| 1 February 2016 | (Venezuela) Adalberto Peñaranda | (Italy) Udinese | Watford | Undisclosed |
| 1 February 2016 | (Venezuela) Adalberto Peñaranda | Watford | (Spain) Granada | Loan |
| 1 February 2016 | (Senegal) Oumar Niasse | (Russia) Lokomotiv Moscow | Everton | £13.5m |
| 1 February 2016 | (Scotland) Jordan Rhodes | Blackburn Rovers | Middlesbrough | £9m |
| 1 February 2016 | (England) James Maddison | Coventry City | Norwich City | Undisclosed |
| 1 February 2016 | (England) Nick Powell | Manchester United | Hull City | Loan |
| 1 February 2016 | (Serbia) Milos Veljkovic | Tottenham Hotspur | (Germany) Werder Bremen | £500,000 |
| 1 February 2016 | (Belgium) Ritchie De Laet | Leicester City | Middlesbrough | Loan |
| 1 February 2016 | (Belgium) Julien De Sart | (Belgium) Standard Liège | Middlesbrough | Undisclosed |

^{a} Player officially joined his club on 2 January 2016.
^{b} Transfer will be completed in January 2016.
