= 2015–16 Brentford F.C. season =

English football team season

Brentford
2015–16 season
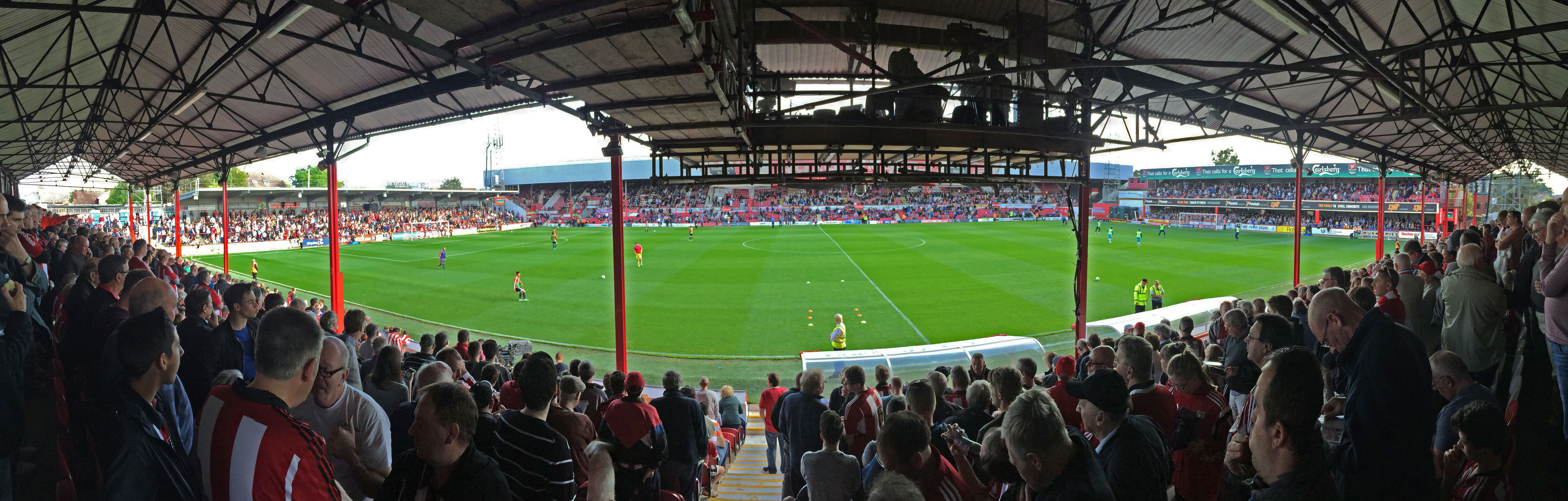
- Owner: Matthew Benham
- Chairman: Cliff Crown
- Head Coach: Marinus Dijkhuizen (until 28 September 2015); Lee Carsley (from 28 September 2015 to 30 November 2015); Dean Smith (from 30 November 2015)
- Stadium: Griffin Park
- Championship: 9th
- FA Cup: Third round (knocked out by Walsall)
- League Cup: First round (knocked out by Oxford United)
- Top goalscorer: Alan Judge and Lasse Vibe (14 goals)
- Highest home attendance: 12,301 (vs. Fulham, 30 April 2016
- Lowest home attendance: 5,177 (vs. Oxford United, 11 August 2015
- Average home league attendance: 10,310
| Home colours | Away colours | Third colours |

The 2015–16 season was Brentford's 126th year in existence and second consecutive season in the Championship. Along with competing in the Championship, the club also participated in the FA Cup and League Cup. The season covers the period from 1 July 2015 to 30 June 2016.

== Season Review ==
=== August ===
Brentford's season began with a 2–2 draw against Ipswich Town. Kevin Bru and Ryan Fraser netted for the visitors but stoppage time goals from Andre Gray and James Tarkowski sealed a point for the Bees. Brentford then welcomed Oxford United to Griffin Park for the League Cup First round but were thrashed 0–4 after fielding a weakened team. During this match, new signing Andreas Bjelland suffered a significant injury to the left knee and was forced out of action for 9 months. On 14 August, Brentford signed right-back Maxime Colin from Anderlecht for an undisclosed fee to replace Moses Odubajo who left to join Hull City. Jota underwent surgery after suffering damaged ankle ligaments in the opening match of the season against Ipswich Town and was expected to be out for around 3 months. On 21 August, Brentford's previous season top goal scorer Andre Gray joined Burnley for a club record fee. Burnley were Brentford's next opponents where they lost 1–0 to a first half Michael Keane header in a game where Gray was ineligible. Brentford then hosted Reading but succumbed to a 1–3 defeat after a poor first half. At the end of the month, Brentford brought in two loan signings: Marco Djuricin from Red Bull Salzburg for a season, and Sergi Canós from Liverpool on an initial half-season loan.

=== September ===
On transfer deadline day, Brentford concluded their summer transfer business with the signing of midfielder Ryan Woods from Shrewsbury Town for a reported £1 million. Brentford also extended the contract of injured striker Scott Hogan until the end of the 2017–18 season as he continued his recovery from a damaged anterior cruciate ligament. Brentford returned to action after the international break with a 1–1 draw away to Leeds United. Djuricin scored in the first half on his debut but Leeds equalised late in the second half after Woods, also on his debut, lost the ball in midfield which led to Mirco Antenucci slotting past Button. Brentford then travelled to Middlesbrough where they lost 3–1. A brace from Cristhian Stuani followed by a goal from Albert Adomah were enough to leave Brentford in 21st place, just above the relegation zone. Dijkhuizen celebrated his first home win at Brentford against Preston North End. Brentford had conceded within the first minute to a Daniel Johnson finish but won the vital three points after goals from Vibe and Djuricin in the second half with substitute Sergi Canós making a noticeable difference when he came on.

On 26 September, Brentford suffered defeat at home against Sheffield Wednesday in a game which finished with 10 men on each team. James Tarkowski was sent off in the first half with Atdhe Nuhiu scoring the resulting penalty. Alan Judge then curled home after a wonderful long pass from goalkeeper David Button. Jérémy Hélan was sent off for a second bookable offence shortly after but with Brentford pushing for a winner, Lucas João scored the decisive goal in the 90th minute which secured Brentford's fourth defeat in six games. Following that loss, on 28 September, Brentford announced that Dijkhuizen and his assistant, Roy Hendriksen had parted company with the club. Lee Carsley was promoted to First Team Head Coach alongside his assistant Paul Williams with Bees legend Kevin O'Connor replacing Carsley as Development Squad Head Coach. Carsley's first game in charge of Brentford was a 0–2 home defeat to Birmingham City. Second half goals from Michael Morrison and former Bee Clayton Donaldson sealed the win for the Blues.

=== October ===
On 1 October, Brentford signed Chelsea midfielder John Swift on an initial one month youth loan. Swift made his debut as a sub in Brentford's next game against Derby County. However, he was unable to stop Brentford losing 0–2 in what was a very poor performance overall for the Bees. Chris Martin and Tom Ince scored the goals for Derby in the first half. During the international break, Josh Clarke joined Barnet on loan until the start of 2016. Domestic football returned to Griffin Park with a 2–1 win over Rotherham United. Judge scored two goals with the first one being a fine volley from the edge of the area. Rotherham had equalised through Joe Mattock straight after the break but Judge soon struck again, this time with a powerful header.

== Transfers & loans ==
=== Transfers in ===
Players transferred in
| Date | Pos. | Name | Previous club | Fee | Ref. |
|---|---|---|---|---|---|
| 1 July 2015 | DF | (France) Yoann Barbet | (France) Chamois Niortais | £500,000 | |
| 1 July 2015 | MF | (Germany) Akaki Gogia | (Germany) Hallescher FC | Free | |
| 1 July 2015 | DF | (Germany) Jan Holldack | (Germany) 1. FC Köln | Free | |
| 1 July 2015 | MF | (Austria) Konstantin Kerschbaumer | (Austria) Admira Wacker | Undisclosed | |
| 1 July 2015 | MF | (England) Ryan Williams | (England) Morecambe | Free | |
| 2 July 2015 | DF | (Denmark) Andreas Bjelland | (Netherlands) Twente | £2,100,000 | |
| 10 July 2015 | MF | (England) Josh McEachran | (England) Chelsea | £500,000 | |
| 23 July 2015 | FW | (Germany) Philipp Hofmann | (Germany) Kaiserslautern | Undisclosed | |
| 24 July 2015 | FW | (Denmark) Lasse Vibe | (Sweden) IFK Göteborg | Undisclosed | |
| 14 August 2015 | DF | (France) Maxime Colin | (Belgium) Anderlecht | £900,000 | |
| 1 September 2015 | MF | (England) Ryan Woods | (England) Shrewsbury Town | £1,000,000 | |
| 22 January 2016 | DF | (England) Nathan Fox | (England) Cray Wanderers | Free | |
| 29 January 2016 | DF | (England) Manny Onariase | (England) West Ham United | Undisclosed | |

Total spending: £5,000,000 ▼

=== Loans in ===
Players loaned in
| Date from | Pos. | Name | Parent club | End date | Ref. |
|---|---|---|---|---|---|
| 31 August 2015 | MF | (Spain) Sergi Canós | (England) Liverpool | End of season | |
| 31 August 2015 | FW | (Austria) Marco Djuricin | (Austria) Red Bull Salzburg | End of season | |
| 1 October 2015 | MF | (England) John Swift | (England) Chelsea | End of season | |
| 17 March 2016 | FW | (Uruguay) Leandro Rodríguez | (England) Everton | 14 April 2016 | |

=== Transfers out ===
Players transferred out
| Date | Pos. | Name | Subsequent club | Fee | Ref. |
|---|---|---|---|---|---|
| 14 July 2015 | FW | (Northern Ireland) Will Grigg | (England) Wigan Athletic | £1,000,000 | |
| 4 August 2015 | MF | (Northern Ireland) Stuart Dallas | (England) Leeds United | £1,300,000 | |
| 4 August 2015 | MF | (Republic of Ireland) Jonathan Douglas | (England) Ipswich Town | Free | |
| 7 August 2015 | DF | (England) Moses Odubajo | (England) Hull City | £3,500,000 | |
| 21 August 2015 | FW | (Jamaica) Andre Gray | (England) Burnley | £9,000,000 | |
| 25 January 2016 | MF | (France) Toumani Diagouraga | (England) Leeds United | £600,000 | |
| 1 February 2016 | DF | (England) James Tarkowski | (England) Burnley | £3,000,000 | |

Total income: ▲£18,400,000

=== Loans out ===
Players loaned out
| Date from | Pos. | Name | Subsequent club | End date | Ref. |
|---|---|---|---|---|---|
| 19 August 2015 | MF | (England) Josh Laurent | (Wales) Newport County | 14 October 2015 | |
| 3 September 2015 | MF | (Portugal) Herson Rodrigues Alves | (England) Hampton & Richmond Borough | 25 September 2015 | |
| 9 September 2015 | GK | (New Zealand) Nik Tzanev | (England) Lewes | 6 October 2015 | |
| 11 September 2015 | DF | (England) Aaron Greene | (England) Boston United | 11 October 2015 | |
| 22 September 2015 | DF | (Finland) Daniel O'Shaughnessy | (England) Braintree Town | 19 October 2015 | |
| 15 October 2015 | DF | (England) Josh Clarke | (England) Barnet | 3 January 2016 | |
| 27 October 2015 | GK | (England) Mark Smith | (England) Hampton & Richmond Borough | 21 December 2015 | |
| 26 November 2015 | MF | (England) James Ferry | (England) Wycombe Wanderers | 23 December 2015 | |
| 26 November 2015 | MF | (England) Jermaine Udumaga | (England) Wycombe Wanderers | 2 February 2016 | |
| 8 January 2016 | GK | (England) Mark Smith | (England) Lowestoft Town | 3 February 2016 | |
| 16 January 2016 | MF | (Spain) Jota | (Spain) SD Eibar | End of season | |
| 28 January 2016 | DF | (Finland) Daniel O'Shaughnessy | (Denmark) FC Midtjylland | End of season | |
| 28 January 2016 | MF | (England) James Ferry | (England) Welling United | 1 March 2016 | |
| 2 February 2016 | DF | (Lithuania) Audrius Laučys | (England) Hemel Hempstead Town | 2 March 2016 | |
| 20 February 2016 | GK | (England) Mark Smith | (England) Hampton & Richmond Borough | End of season | |

=== Released ===
Players released
| Date | Pos. | Name | Subsequent club | Join date | Ref. |
|---|---|---|---|---|---|
| 4 July 2015 | DF | (England) Tony Craig | (England) Millwall | 4 July 2015 | |
| 3 November 2015 | DF | (France) Raphaël Calvet | (France) AJ Auxerre | January 2016 | |
| 19 December 2015 | MF | (Spain) Marcos Tébar | (Spain) UE Llagostera | 1 January 2016 | |
| 1 February 2016 | MF | (England) Josh Laurent | (England) Hartlepool United | 1 February 2016 | |
| 1 February 2016 | FW | (England) Montell Moore | (England) Charlton Athletic | 15 February 2016 | |
| 1 February 2016 | MF | (England) Ryan Williams | (Scotland) Inverness Caledonian Thistle | 1 February 2016 | |
| 11 April 2016 | DF | (England) Gradi Milenge | (England) Grays Athletic | 10 September 2016 | |
| 15 April 2016 | FW | (England) Jermaine Udumaga | (Sweden) KSF Prespa Birlik | 6 August 2016 | |
| 30 June 2016 | DF | (England) Aaron Greene | (England) A.F.C. Sudbury | 8 August 2016 | |
| 30 June 2016 | DF | (Lithuania) Audrius Laučys | (England) Concord Rangers | 19 August 2016 | |
| 30 June 2016 | DF | (Finland) Daniel O'Shaughnessy | (England) Cheltenham Town | 12 July 2016 | |
| 30 June 2016 | MF | (England) Courtney Senior | (England) Colchester United | 1 July 2016 | |
| 30 June 2016 | GK | (England) Mark Smith | (England) Aldershot Town | 2 August 2016 | |
| 30 June 2016 | GK | (New Zealand) Nik Tzanev | (England) AFC Wimbledon | 28 April 2017 | |

== Pre-season and friendlies ==
| 14 July 2015 Friendly | Farense | 0–3 | Brentford | Albufeira, Portugal |
| 18:00 CEST | | Report | Udumaga 45'; Gray 78'; Douglas 90' | Stadium: Estádio da Nora |

| 19 July 2015 Friendly | Boreham Wood | 0–3 | Brentford | Borehamwood |
| 15:00 BST | | BFC Report; BWFC Report | Gray 15' (pen.), 45'; Jota 33' | Stadium: Meadow Park; Referee: O'Donnell |

| 22 July 2015 Friendly | Tottenham Hotspur | 2–1 | Brentford | Enfield |
| 13:00 BST | Coulthirst 25' (pen.); Alli 90+1' (pen.) | BFC Report; THFC Report | Udumaga 90+3' | Stadium: Enfield Training Centre; Attendance: 0 |

| 25 July 2015 Friendly | Brentford | 2–0 | Stoke City | Brentford |
| 13:30 BST | Gogia 33'; Dallas 73' | BFC Report; SCFC Report | | Stadium: Griffin Park |

| 28 July 2015 Friendly | Luton Town | 2–1 | Brentford | Luton |
| 19:45 BST | Wilkinson 40'; Zola 78' | BFC Report; LTFC Report | Hofmann 44' | Stadium: Kenilworth Road; Attendance: 2,556 |

| 1 August 2015 Friendly | Norwich City | 2–1 | Brentford | Norwich |
| 15:00 BST | Hoolahan 17'; Jerome 66' | Report | Gray 18' | Stadium: Carrow Road; Attendance: 10,606 |

| 23 November 2015 Friendly | Tottenham Hotspur XI | 1–4 | Brentford XI | Enfield |
| | Winks | Report | Canós; Hofmann; Jota | Stadium: Hotspur Way; Attendance: 0 |

| 17 December 2015 Friendly | Chelsea XI | 3–2 | Brentford XI | Cobham |
| | Muheim; Sterling; Mitchell (pen.) | BFC Report; CFC Report | Holldack; Parish | Stadium: Cobham Training Centre; Attendance: 0 |

== Championship ==
=== League results summary ===
| Overall | | | | | | | | Home | | | | | | Away | | | | | |
| Pld | W | D | L | GF | GA | GD | Pts | W | D | L | GF | GA | GD | W | D | L | GF | GA | GD |
|---|---|---|---|---|---|---|---|---|---|---|---|---|---|---|---|---|---|---|---|
| 46 | 19 | 8 | 19 | 72 | 67 | +5 | 65 | 10 | 4 | 9 | 33 | 30 | +3 | 9 | 4 | 10 | 39 | 37 | +2 |

Last updated: 7 May 2016.
Source: []

=== Results and position by round ===
| Round | 1 | 2 | 3 | 4 | 5 | 6 | 7 | 8 | 9 | 10 | 11 | 12 | 13 | 14 | 15 | 16 | 17 | 18 | 19 | 20 | 21 | 22 | 23 | 24 | 25 | 26 | 27 | 28 | 29 | 30 | 31 | 32 | 33 | 34 | 35 | 36 | 37 | 38 | 39 | 40 | 41 | 42 | 43 | 44 | 45 | 46 |
|---|---|---|---|---|---|---|---|---|---|---|---|---|---|---|---|---|---|---|---|---|---|---|---|---|---|---|---|---|---|---|---|---|---|---|---|---|---|---|---|---|---|---|---|---|---|---|
| Ground | H | A | A | H | A | A | H | H | H | A | H | A | A | H | H | A | H | A | H | A | A | H | H | A | A | H | H | A | H | A | A | H | H | A | H | A | H | A | H | A | H | H | A | A | H | A |
| Result | D | W | L | L | D | L | W | L | L | L | W | W | W | W | L | D | W | D | W | D | L | W | D | W | L | L | L | W | D | L | L | L | W | L | L | L | L | W | W | W | D | W | W | L | W | W |
| Position | 8 | 3 | 14 | 18 | 18 | 21 | 17 | 19 | 19 | 20 | 19 | 15 | 12 | 11 | 12 | 11 | 11 | 11 | 10 | 10 | 10 | 10 | 9 | 8 | 10 | 11 | 11 | 10 | 10 | 12 | 13 | 14 | 11 | 14 | 17 | 17 | 18 | 17 | 14 | 13 | 13 | 13 | 10 | 10 | 10 | 9 |

Updated to match(es) played on 7 May 2016. Source: BFC
A = Away; H = Home; W = Win; D = Draw; L = Loss

=== League table ===
| Pos | Team | Pld | W | D | L | GF | GA | GD | Pts |
|---|---|---|---|---|---|---|---|---|---|
| 7 | Ipswich Town | 46 | 18 | 15 | 13 | 53 | 51 | +2 | 69 |
| 8 | Cardiff City | 46 | 17 | 17 | 12 | 56 | 51 | +5 | 68 |
| 9 | Brentford | 46 | 19 | 8 | 19 | 72 | 67 | +5 | 65 |
| 10 | Birmingham City | 46 | 16 | 15 | 15 | 53 | 49 | +4 | 63 |
| 11 | Preston North End | 46 | 15 | 17 | 14 | 45 | 45 | 0 | 62 |

Source: BBC Sport
Rules for classification: 1) Points; 2) Goal difference; 3) Number of goals scored

=== Matches ===
On 17 June 2015, the fixtures for the forthcoming season were announced.

| 8 August 2015 1 | Brentford | 2–2 | Ipswich Town | Brentford, London |
| 15:00 BST | Jota (yellow card) 83'; Gray 90+2'; Tarkowski 90+6' | Report | Bru 45'; Fraser 50' | Stadium: Griffin Park; Attendance: 10,789; Referee: David Coote |

| 15 August 2015 2 | Bristol City | 2–4 | Brentford | Bristol |
| 15:00 BST | Pack (yellow card) 6'; Kodjia 2'; Wilbraham 23'; Freeman (red card) 35' | Report | Judge 9', 43'; Gogia (yellow card) 21'; Dean (yellow card) 25'; Gray 60'; Hofmann 71' | Stadium: Ashton Gate; Attendance: 14,291; Referee: Keith Stroud |

| 22 August 2015 3 | Burnley | 1–0 | Brentford | Burnley |
| 15:00 BST | Duff (yellow card) 16'; Keane 26' | Report | McCormack (yellow card) 45+2'; Diagouraga (yellow card) 53' | Stadium: Turf Moor; Attendance: 14,928; Referee: David Webb |

| 29 August 2015 4 | Brentford | 1–3 | Reading | Brentford, London |
| 15:00 BST | Tarkowski (yellow card) 31'; McCormack (yellow card) 53'; Hofmann (yellow card) 57'; Vibe 67'; Bidwell (yellow card) 84'; Button (yellow card) 90+8' | Report | Sá 17'; Obita (yellow card) 22'; Blackman 32', 90+9' (pen.); Gunter (yellow card) 87'; Bond (yellow card) 90+6' | Stadium: Griffin Park; Attendance: 10,206; Referee: Andy Madley |

| 12 September 2015 5 | Leeds United | 1–1 | Brentford | Leeds |
| 15:00 BST | Dallas (yellow card) 45+2'; Antenucci 76', (yellow card) 77' | Report | Colin (yellow card) 5'; Djuricin 29'; Diagouraga (yellow card) 82'; Judge (yellow card) 85' | Stadium: Elland Road; Attendance: 25,126; Referee: Nigel Miller |

| 15 September 2015 6 | Middlesbrough | 3–1 | Brentford | Middlesbrough |
| 19:45 BST | Stuani (yellow card) 31', (goal) 35', 69'; Nugent (yellow card) 37'; Amorebieta (yellow card) 47'; Adomah 77' | Report | Vibe 49'; Judge (yellow card) 58'; Colin (yellow card) 80'; Barbet (yellow card) 86' | Stadium: Riverside Stadium; Attendance: 20,138; Referee: Graham Salisbury |

| 19 September 2015 7 | Brentford | 2–1 | Preston North End | Brentford, London |
| 15:00 BST | McCormack (yellow card) 38'; Vibe 62'; Djuricin 65', (yellow card) 66'; Canós (yellow card) 67' | Report | Johnson 1', (yellow card) 24'; Garner (yellow card) 36'; Huntington (yellow card) 74'; Humphrey (yellow card) 90+6' | Stadium: Griffin Park; Attendance: 9,463; Referee: Tim Robinson |

| 26 September 2015 8 | Brentford | 1–2 | Sheffield Wednesday | Brentford, London |
| 15:00 BST | McCormack (yellow card) 28'; Tarkowski (red card) 36'; Judge 77'; Button (yellow card) 90+2' | Report | Nuhiu 37' (pen.); Hélan (yellow card) 65' (yellow-red card) 78'; Hutchinson (yellow card) 80'; Lucas João 90' | Stadium: Griffin Park; Attendance: 9,756; Referee: Geoff Eltringham |

| 29 September 2015 9 | Brentford | 0–2 | Birmingham City | Brentford, London |
| 19:45 BST | McCormack (yellow card) 75'; Dean (yellow card) 78' | Report | Morrison 71'; Caddis (yellow card) 80'; Donaldson 90+4' | Stadium: Griffin Park; Attendance: 9,528; Referee: Keith Hill |

| 3 October 2015 10 | Derby County | 2–0 | Brentford | Derby |
| 15:00 BST | Martin 20'; Thorne (yellow card) 28'; Russell (yellow card) 43'; Ince 44', (yellow card) 88' | Report | Tarkowski (yellow card) 55'; Woods (yellow card) 58'; Yennaris (yellow card) 63' | Stadium: Pride Park; Attendance: 29,467; Referee: Jeremy Simpson |

| 17 October 2015 11 | Brentford | 2–1 | Rotherham United | Brentford, London |
| 15:00 BST | Judge 2', 57'; McCormack (yellow card) 73'; Diagouraga (yellow card) 88' | Report | Mattock 46'; Smallwood (yellow card) 53'; Ledesma (yellow card) 90+4' | Stadium: Griffin Park; Attendance: 10,293; Referee: Iain Williamson |

| 21 October 2015 12 | Wolverhampton Wanderers | 0–2 | Brentford | Wolverhampton |
| 19:45 BST | Iorfa (yellow card) 66' | Report | Bidwell (yellow card) 14'; Djuricin 17'; Tarkowski (yellow card) 56'; Hofmann 88' | Stadium: Molineux; Attendance: 18,167; Referee: Paul Tierney |

| 24 October 2015 13 | Charlton Athletic | 0–3 | Brentford | Charlton, London |
| 15:00 BST | McAleny (yellow card) 77' | Report | Swift 26'; Judge 55'; Vibe 86' | Stadium: The Valley; Attendance: 14,585; Referee: Stuart Attwell |

| 30 October 2015 14 | Brentford | 1–0 | Queens Park Rangers | Brentford, London |
| 19:45 GMT | McCormack (yellow card) 21'; Djuricin 56', (yellow card) 87' | Report | Hill (yellow card) 21'; Tőzsér (yellow card) 25'; Phillips (yellow card) 81' | Stadium: Griffin Park; Attendance: 12,037; Referee: Simon Hooper |

| 3 November 2015 15 | Brentford | 0–2 | Hull City | Brentford, London |
| 19:45 GMT | | Report | Akpom (yellow card) 66'; Robertson 67' (yellow card) 75'; Clucas 86' | Stadium: Griffin Park; Attendance: 9,221; Referee: Gavin Ward |

| 7 November 2015 16 | Blackburn Rovers | 1–1 | Brentford | Blackburn |
| 15:00 GMT | Lawrence 37'; Olsson (yellow card) 83' | Report | Yennaris (yellow card) 14'; Vibe 24'; Kerschbaumer (yellow card) 45+5'; Bidwell (yellow card) 90+2' | Stadium: Ewood Park; Attendance: 12,328; Referee: Andy Woolmer |

| 21 November 2015 17 | Brentford | 2–1 | Nottingham Forest | Brentford, London |
| 15:00 GMT | Canós 63'; Dean (red card) 71'; Woods (yellow card) 90+4'; Hofmann 90+6' | Report | Lansbury (yellow card) 24', (goal) 74' | Stadium: Griffin Park; Attendance: 11,403; Referee: Brendan Malone |

| 30 November 2015 18 | Bolton Wanderers | 1–1 | Brentford | Bolton |
| 19:45 GMT | Davies (yellow card) 24'; Feeney (yellow card) 62'; Vela (yellow card) 64'; Danns 65' | Report | Swift 10', (yellow card) 45+1'; Tarkowski (yellow card) 90+2' | Stadium: Macron Stadium; Attendance: 12,731; Referee: Carl Boyeson |

| 5 December 2015 19 | Brentford | 2–0 | MK Dons | Brentford, London |
| 15:00 GMT | O'Connell (yellow card) 18'; Vibe 20'; Judge 71' | Report | Murphy (yellow card) 40' | Stadium: Griffin Park; Attendance: 9,682; Referee: Oliver Langford |

| 12 December 2015 20 | Fulham | 2–2 | Brentford | Fulham, London |
| 15:00 GMT | Fredericks (yellow card) 27'; Tarkowski 40' (o.g.); Stearman (yellow card) 57'; Dembélé 64' | Report | Judge 18' (pen.); Canós (yellow card) 36'; O'Connell (yellow card) 57', (goal) 71' | Stadium: Craven Cottage; Attendance: 19,411; Referee: David Coote |

| 15 December 2015 21 | Cardiff City | 3–2 | Brentford | Cardiff |
| 19:45 GMT | Watt 20'; Jones 34', 90+3'; Pilkington (yellow card) 81' | Report | Diagouraga (yellow card) 42'; Bidwell 69'; Swift 86' | Stadium: Cardiff City Stadium; Attendance: 12,729; Referee: Simon Hooper |

| 19 December 2015 22 | Brentford | 4–2 | Huddersfield Town | Brentford, London |
| 15:00 GMT | Canós 5'; Vibe 21'; Diagouraga (yellow card) 26'; Judge 31', 55' (pen.) | Report | Hudson (yellow card) 30'; Lolley 46'; Wells (yellow card) 65'; Dempsey 90+2' | Stadium: Griffin Park; Attendance: 10,262; Referee: Phil Gibbs |

| 26 December 2015 23 | Brentford | 0–0 | Brighton & Hove Albion | Brentford, London |
| 13:00 GMT | Bidwell (yellow card) 80' | Report | Greer (yellow card) 15'; Stephens (yellow card) 55'; Dunk (yellow card) 75' | Stadium: Griffin Park; Attendance: 12,202; Referee: Darren Deadman |

| 28 December 2015 24 | Reading | 1–2 | Brentford | Reading |
| 15:00 GMT | Hector (yellow card) 12' (yellow-red card) 87'; McCleary 58'; Quinn (yellow card) 73'; Williams (yellow card) 75' | Report | Tarkowski (yellow card) 5'; Woods 17'; Diagouraga (yellow card) 28'; Canós 72'; Button (yellow card) 80'; Dean (yellow card) 87' | Stadium: Madejski Stadium; Attendance: 20,563; Referee: Keith Stroud |

| 2 January 2016 25 | Birmingham City | 2–1 | Brentford | Birmingham |
| 15:00 GMT | Kieftenbeld (yellow card) 11', (goal) 89'; Toral (yellow card) 45+3'; Maghoma 55'; Vaughan (yellow card) 63'; Grounds (yellow card) 84' | Report | Dean (yellow card) 17'; Tarkowski (yellow card) 45+3'; Hofmann 77' | Stadium: St Andrew's; Attendance: 17,555; Referee: Graham Scott |

| 12 January 2016 26 | Brentford | 0–1 | Middlesbrough | Brentford, London |
| 19:45 GMT | Bidwell (yellow card) 76' | Report | Button 61' (o.g.); Ayala (yellow card) 64'; Stuani (yellow card) 82'; Clayton (yellow card) 90+2' | Stadium: Griffin Park; Attendance: 10,312; Referee: Gavin Ward |

| 15 January 2016 27 | Brentford | 1–3 | Burnley | Brentford, London |
| 19:45 GMT | Judge 57' | Report | Arfield 12'; Barton 30'; Boyd 39' | Stadium: Griffin Park; Attendance: 10,039; Referee: Chris Kavanagh |

| 23 January 2016 28 | Preston North End | 1–3 | Brentford | Preston |
| 15:00 GMT | Reach 24'; Huntington (yellow card) 29'; Garner (yellow card) 45+3'; Gallagher (yellow card) 45+5'; Cunningham (yellow card) 75' | Report | Bidwell 22'; Colin (yellow card) 30'; Judge 43'; Dean (yellow card) 69'; Swift 80' | Stadium: Deepdale Stadium; Attendance: 11,080; Referee: David Webb |

| 26 January 2016 29 | Brentford | 1–1 | Leeds United | Brentford, London |
| 19:45 GMT | Saunders 27'; Djuricin (yellow card) 81' | Report | Cooper (yellow card) 34'; Carayol (yellow card) 79', (goal) 84'; Bellusci (yellow card) 79'; Bridcutt (yellow card) 79' | Stadium: Griffin Park; Attendance: 10,051; Referee: Iain Williamson |

| 5 February 2016 30 | Brighton & Hove Albion | 3–0 | Brentford | Brighton |
| 19:45 GMT | Knockaert 27'; Stockdale (yellow card) 36'; Hemed 43'; Murphy 90+3' | Report | Woods (yellow card) 42' | Stadium: Falmer Stadium; Attendance: 24,096; Referee: Keith Stroud |

| 13 February 2016 31 | Sheffield Wednesday | 4–0 | Brentford | Sheffield |
| 15:00 GMT | Forestieri 12'; Hooper 30'; Lee 45'; Lucas João 89' | Report | Barbet (red card) 5' | Stadium: Hillsborough; Attendance: 20,921; Referee: Scott Duncan |

| 20 February 2016 32 | Brentford | 1–2 | Derby County | Brentford, London |
| 15:00 GMT | McEachran (yellow card) 30'; Judge 43' | Report | Hendrick 80'; Christie 84'; Martin 90+5' | Stadium: Griffin Park; Attendance: 10,627; Referee: Darren Drysdale |

| 23 February 2016 33 | Brentford | 3–0 | Wolverhampton Wanderers | Brentford, London |
| 19:45 GMT | Swift 38', 67'; Canos 56'; Kerschbaumer (yellow card) 90+2' | Report | McDonald (yellow card) 71' | Stadium: Griffin Park; Attendance: 8,769; Referee: Charles Breakspear |

| 27 February 2016 34 | Rotherham United | 2–1 | Brentford | Rotherham |
| 15:00 GMT | Derbyshire 29' (yellow card) 30'; Ward 71' | Report | Judge 43'; McEachran (yellow card) 56'; Bidwell (yellow card) 88' | Stadium: New York Stadium; Attendance: 8,534; Referee: Mark Brown |

| 5 March 2016 35 | Brentford | 1–2 | Charlton Athletic | Brentford, London |
| 15:00 GMT | Barbet 26'; Canós (yellow card) 53'; Judge (yellow card) 90'; Hofmann (yellow card) 90+4' | Report | Harriott 1', 69'; Sanogo (yellow card) 13'; Poyet (yellow card) 45+3'; Motta (yellow card) 56'; Fanni (yellow card) 87' | Stadium: Griffin Park; Attendance: 10,108; Referee: Brendan Malone |

| 12 March 2016 36 | Queens Park Rangers | 3–0 | Brentford | Shepherd's Bush, London |
| 15:00 GMT | Hoilett 38' (yellow card) 49'; Polter (yellow card) 45+1' (goal) 66'; Henry (yellow card) 48'; Chery 71'; Luongo (yellow card) 90+1' | Report | Canós (yellow card) 32'; Woods (yellow card) 48'; McCormack (yellow card) 90+1' | Stadium: Loftus Road Stadium; Attendance: 17,894; Referee: Fred Graham |

| 19 March 2016 37 | Brentford | 0–1 | Blackburn Rovers | Brentford, London |
| 15:00 GMT | McEachran (yellow card) 78' | Report | Hanley (yellow card) 28' (yellow-red card) 57'; Graham (yellow card) 63'; Akpan (yellow card) 74'; Duffy 86' (yellow card) 87'; Lenihan (yellow card) 90+2'; Watt (yellow card) 90+5' | Stadium: Griffin Park; Attendance: 10,575; Referee: Michael Bull |

| 2 April 2016 38 | Nottingham Forest | 0–3 | Brentford | Nottingham |
| 15:00 BST | Mills (yellow card) 61'; Lansbury (yellow card) 66'; Lichaj (yellow card) 72' (yellow-red card) 77' | Report | McCormack (yellow card) 20'; Vibe 49'; Judge (yellow card) 58'; Barbet (yellow card) 60'; Yennaris 65'; Dean (yellow card) 86'; Canós 87' | Stadium: City Ground; Attendance: 19,444; Referee: Peter Bankes |

| 5 April 2016 39 | Brentford | 3–1 | Bolton Wanderers | Brentford, London |
| 19:45 BST | Yennaris 17'; Vibe 26', 36' | Report | Clough 70' (pen.) (yellow card) 72'; Vela (yellow card) 71'; Pratley (yellow card) 86'; Wheater (yellow card) 90+1' | Stadium: Griffin Park; Attendance: 9,062; Referee: Andy Davies |

| 9 April 2016 40 | Ipswich Town | 1–3 | Brentford | Ipswich |
| 15:00 BST | Hyam (yellow card) 3' (yellow-red card) 45+5'; Varney (yellow card) 57'; Feeney 88' | Report | Saunders 29'; Woods (yellow card) 45+5'; Vibe 64', 68' | Stadium: Portman Road; Attendance: 18,845; Referee: Phil Gibbs |

| 16 April 2016 41 | Brentford | 1–1 | Bristol City | Brentford, London |
| 15:00 BST | Hogan 90+1'; McCormack (yellow card) 90+2' | Report | Tomlin (yellow card) 18' (goal) 45'; Pack (yellow card) 32'; Bryan (yellow card) 69' | Stadium: Griffin Park; Attendance: 12,071; Referee: Darren Handley |

| 19 April 2016 42 | Brentford | 2–1 | Cardiff City | Brentford, London |
| 19:45 BST | Saunders (yellow card) 22'; Hogan 83', 86'; Button (yellow card) 90+5' | Report | Connolly (yellow card) 25'; Noone (yellow card) 61'; Zohore 89' | Stadium: Griffin Park; Attendance: 8,363; Referee: Stuart Attwell |

| 23 April 2016 43 | MK Dons | 1–4 | Brentford | Milton Keynes |
| 15:00 BST | Maynard 6' | Report | Canós 9'; Vibe 49'; Woods 78'; Bidwell 89' | Stadium: Stadium MK; Attendance: 11,564; Referee: Andy Woolmer |

| 26 April 2016 44 | Hull City | 2–0 | Brentford | Hull |
| 19:45 BST | Dean 31' (o.g.); Diamé 45' | Report | Woods (yellow card) 65'; O'Connell (yellow card) 77'; Saunders (yellow card) 89' | Stadium: KC Stadium; Attendance: 15,225; Referee: Darren Bond |

| 30 April 2016 45 | Brentford | 3–0 | Fulham | Brentford, London |
| 15:00 BST | Saunders 5'; Hogan 7', 40'; Canós (yellow card) 51' | Report | | Stadium: Griffin Park; Attendance: 12,301; Referee: Mark Haywood |

| 7 May 2016 46 | Huddersfield Town | 1–5 | Brentford | Huddersfield |
| 12:30 BST | Paterson 50'; Whitehead (yellow card) 82' | Report | Canós 1'; Woods (yellow card) 7'; Dean (yellow card) 12'; Hogan 52', 62'; Vibe 67'; Yennaris (yellow card) 82'; Swift 88' | Stadium: Kirklees Stadium; Referee: Dean Whitestone |

=== Score overview ===
| Opposition | Home score | Away score | Double |
|---|---|---|---|
| Birmingham City | 0–2 | 1–2 | No |
| Blackburn Rovers | 0–1 | 1–1 | No |
| Bolton Wanderers | 3–1 | 1–1 | No |
| Brighton & Hove Albion | 0–0 | 0–3 | No |
| Bristol City | 1–1 | 4–2 | No |
| Burnley | 1–3 | 0–1 | No |
| Cardiff City | 2–1 | 2–3 | No |
| Charlton Athletic | 1–2 | 3–0 | No |
| Derby County | 1–3 | 0–2 | No |
| Fulham | 3–1 | 2–2 | No |
| Huddersfield Town | 4–2 | 5–1 | Yes |
| Hull City | 0–2 | 0–2 | No |
| Ipswich Town | 2–2 | 3–1 | No |
| Leeds United | 1–1 | 1–1 | No |
| MK Dons | 2–0 | 4–1 | Yes |
| Middlesbrough | 0–1 | 1–3 | No |
| Nottingham Forest | 2–1 | 3–0 | Yes |
| Preston | 2–1 | 3–1 | Yes |
| QPR | 1–0 | 0–3 | No |
| Reading | 1–3 | 2–1 | No |
| Rotherham United | 2–1 | 1–2 | No |
| Sheffield Wednesday | 1–2 | 0–4 | No |
| Wolverhampton Wanderers | 3–0 | 2–0 | Yes |

== League Cup ==
On 16 June 2015, the first round draw was made, Brentford were drawn at home against Oxford United.

| 11 August 2015 First round | Brentford | 0–4 | Oxford United | Brentford, London |
| 19:45 BST | | Report | Sercombe 5' (yellow card) 65'; Hylton 9'; Roofe 12'; MacDonald (yellow card) 31'; Mullins 54' | Stadium: Griffin Park; Attendance: 5,177; Referee: Dean Whitestone |

== FA Cup ==
| 9 January 2016 Third round | Brentford | 0–1 | Walsall | Brentford, London |
| 15:00 GMT | | Report | Mantom 34'; Bradshaw (yellow card) 60' | Stadium: Griffin Park; Attendance: 7,950; Referee: Andy Davies |

== First team squad ==
Players' ages are as of the opening day of the 2015–16 season.

| Squad No. | Name | Nationality | Position | Date of birth (age) | Signed from | Signed in | Notes |
Goalkeepers
| 16 | Jack Bonham | (Republic of Ireland) | GK | 14 September 1993 (aged 21) | Watford | 2013 | |
| 27 | David Button | (England) | GK | 27 February 1989 (aged 26) | Charlton Athletic | 2013 | |
| 31 | Mark Smith | (England) | GK | 15 December 1995 (aged 19) | Queens Park Rangers | 2014 | Loaned to Hampton and Richmond Borough and Lowestoft Town |
Defenders
| 2 | Maxime Colin | (France) | RB | 15 November 1991 (aged 23) | RSC Anderlecht | 2015 | |
| 3 | Jake Bidwell | (England) | LB | 21 March 1991 (aged 24) | Everton | 2013 | |
| 5 | Andreas Bjelland | (Denmark) | CB | 11 July 1988 (aged 27) | FC Twente | 2015 | |
| 6 | Harlee Dean | (England) | CB | 26 July 1991 (aged 24) | Southampton | 2012 | |
| 22 | Jack O'Connell | (England) | CB / LB | 29 March 1994 (aged 21) | Blackburn Rovers | 2015 | |
| 29 | Yoann Barbet | (France) | CB | 10 May 1993 (aged 22) | Chamois Niortais | 2015 | |
| 36 | Josh Clarke | (England) | RB / RW | 5 July 1994 (aged 21) | Youth | 2011 | Loaned to Barnet |
| 39 | Tom Field | (Republic of Ireland) | LB | 14 March 1997 (aged 18) | Youth | 2012 | |
Midfielders
| 4 | Lewis Macleod | (Scotland) | CM | 16 June 1994 (aged 21) | Rangers | 2015 | |
| 7 | Sam Saunders | (England) | RM | 19 August 1983 (aged 31) | Dagenham & Redbridge | 2009 | |
| 10 | Josh McEachran | (England) | CM | 1 March 1993 (aged 22) | Chelsea | 2015 | |
| 12 | Alan McCormack | (Republic of Ireland) | CM / RB | 10 January 1984 (aged 31) | Swindon Town | 2013 | |
| 15 | Ryan Woods | (England) | CM / RM | 13 December 1993 (aged 21) | Shrewsbury Town | 2015 | |
| 17 | Konstantin Kerschbaumer | (Austria) | CM / AM | 1 July 1992 (aged 23) | Admira Wacker Mödling | 2015 | |
| 18 | Alan Judge | (Republic of Ireland) | AM | 11 November 1988 (aged 26) | Blackburn Rovers | 2014 | |
| 19 | John Swift | (England) | CM / LM | 23 June 1995 (aged 20) | Chelsea | 2015 | On loan from Chelsea |
| 23 | Jota | (Spain) | AM / RM | 16 June 1991 (aged 24) | Celta de Vigo | 2014 | Loaned to SD Eibar |
| 24 | Akaki Gogia | (Germany) | AM / LM | 18 January 1992 (aged 23) | Hallescher FC | 2015 | |
| 28 | Nico Yennaris | (China) | CM / RB | 24 May 1993 (aged 22) | Arsenal | 2014 | |
| 38 | James Ferry | (England) | CM | 20 April 1997 (aged 18) | Youth | 2012 | Loaned to Wycombe Wanderers and Welling United |
| 40 | Reece Cole | (England) | CM | 17 February 1998 (aged 17) | Youth | 2012 | |
| 47 | Sergi Canós | (Spain) | RW | 2 February 1997 (aged 18) | Liverpool | 2015 | On loan from Liverpool |
Forwards
| 8 | Marco Djuricin | (Austria) | ST | 12 December 1992 (aged 22) | Red Bull Salzburg | 2015 | On loan from Red Bull Salzburg |
| 9 | Scott Hogan | (Republic of Ireland) | ST | 13 April 1992 (aged 23) | Rochdale | 2014 | |
| 11 | Philipp Hofmann | (Germany) | ST | 30 March 1993 (aged 22) | 1. FC Kaiserslautern | 2015 | |
| 21 | Lasse Vibe | (Denmark) | ST / RW | 22 February 1987 (aged 28) | IFK Göteborg | 2015 | |
| 37 | Courtney Senior | (England) | ST / RW | 30 June 1997 (aged 18) | Youth | 2011 | |
Players who left the club mid-season
| 14 | Marcos Tébar | (Spain) | AM | 7 February 1986 (aged 29) | UD Almería | 2014 | Released |
| ~~19~~ | Andre Gray | (Jamaica) | ST | 26 June 1991 (aged 24) | Luton Town | 2014 | Transferred to Burnley |
| ~~20~~ | Toumani Diagouraga | (France) | CM | 9 June 1987 (aged 28) | Peterborough United | 2010 | Transferred to Leeds United |
| 20 | Leandro Rodríguez | (Uruguay) | ST | 19 November 1992 (aged 22) | Everton | 2016 | Returned to Everton after loan |
| 25 | Raphaël Calvet | (France) | CB | 7 February 1994 (aged 21) | AJ Auxerre | 2013 | Released |
| 26 | James Tarkowski | (England) | CB | 19 November 1992 (aged 22) | Oldham Athletic | 2014 | Transferred to Burnley |
| 30 | Ryan Williams | (England) | CM | 8 April 1991 (aged 24) | Morecambe | 2015 | Released |
| 34 | Josh Laurent | (England) | CM | 6 May 1995 (aged 20) | Queens Park Rangers | 2015 | Loaned to Newport County, released |
| 35 | Jermaine Udumaga | (England) | AM / ST | 22 June 1995 (aged 20) | Crystal Palace | 2014 | Loaned to Wycombe Wanderers, released |

Source: soccerbase.com

== Coaching staff ==
Last updated 1 February 2016

| Name | Role |
|---|---|
| Dean Smith | Head Coach |
| Richard O'Kelly | Assistant Head Coach |
| Phil Giles | Co-Director of Football |
| Rasmus Ankersen | Co-Director of Football |
| Simon Royce | Goalkeeping Coach |
| Tom Bates | Coach |
| Bartek Sylwestrzak | Coach |
| Gianni Vio | Coach |
| Luke Stopforth | Head of Performance Analysis |
| Neil Greig | Head of Medical |
| Matt Springham | Head of Conditioning |
| Tom Perryman | Conditioning Coach |
| James Perdue | Conditioning Coach |
| Daryl Martin | Physiotherapist |
| Richard Clarke | Physiotherapist |
| Matt Stride | Team Doctor |
| Bob Oteng | Kit Logistics Manager |

== Statistics ==
=== Appearances and goals ===
Last Updated 7 May 2016

| No. | Pos | Nat | Player | Total | | Championship | | FA Cup | | League Cup | |
| No. | Pos | Nat | Player | Apps | Goals | Apps | Goals | Apps | Goals | Apps | Goals |
|---|---|---|---|---|---|---|---|---|---|---|---|
| 2 | DF | (France) FRA | Maxime Colin | 21 | 0 | 20+1 | 0 | 0+0 | 0 | 0+0 | 0 |
| 3 | DF | (England) ENG | Jake Bidwell | 47 | 3 | 45+0 | 3 | 1+0 | 0 | 0+1 | 0 |
| 4 | MF | (Scotland) SCO | Lewis Macleod | 1 | 0 | 0+1 | 0 | 0+0 | 0 | 0+0 | 0 |
| 5 | DF | (Denmark) DEN | Andreas Bjelland | 1 | 0 | 0+0 | 0 | 0+0 | 0 | 1+0 | 0 |
| 6 | DF | (England) ENG | Harlee Dean | 43 | 0 | 42+0 | 0 | 1+0 | 0 | 0+0 | 0 |
| 7 | MF | (England) ENG | Sam Saunders | 25 | 3 | 12+13 | 3 | 0+0 | 0 | 0+0 | 0 |
| 8 | FW | (Austria) AUT | Marco Djuricin | 23 | 4 | 17+5 | 4 | 0+1 | 0 | 0+0 | 0 |
| 9 | FW | (Republic of Ireland) IRL | Scott Hogan | 7 | 7 | 2+5 | 7 | 0+0 | 0 | 0+0 | 0 |
| 10 | MF | (England) ENG | Josh McEachran | 15 | 0 | 10+4 | 0 | 1+0 | 0 | 0+0 | 0 |
| 11 | FW | (Germany) GER | Philipp Hofmann | 22 | 4 | 5+16 | 4 | 1+0 | 0 | 0+0 | 0 |
| 12 | MF | (Republic of Ireland) IRL | Alan McCormack | 29 | 0 | 25+2 | 0 | 1+0 | 0 | 0+1 | 0 |
| 15 | MF | (England) ENG | Ryan Woods | 42 | 2 | 38+3 | 2 | 1+0 | 0 | 0+0 | 0 |
| 16 | GK | (Republic of Ireland) IRL | Jack Bonham | 1 | 0 | 0+0 | 0 | 0+0 | 0 | 1+0 | 0 |
| 17 | MF | (Austria) AUT | Konstantin Kerschbaumer | 31 | 0 | 18+12 | 0 | 0+1 | 0 | 0+0 | 0 |
| 18 | MF | (Republic of Ireland) IRL | Alan Judge | 39 | 14 | 38+0 | 14 | 0+1 | 0 | 0+0 | 0 |
| 19 | MF | (England) ENG | John Swift | 28 | 7 | 23+4 | 7 | 1+0 | 0 | 0+0 | 0 |
| 21 | FW | (Denmark) DEN | Lasse Vibe | 42 | 14 | 29+12 | 14 | 0+0 | 0 | 1+0 | 0 |
| 22 | DF | (England) ENG | Jack O'Connell | 18 | 1 | 9+7 | 1 | 1+0 | 0 | 1+0 | 0 |
| 23 | MF | (Spain) ESP | Jota | 5 | 0 | 1+4 | 0 | 0+0 | 0 | 0+0 | 0 |
| 24 | MF | (Germany) GER | Akaki Gogia | 14 | 0 | 5+8 | 0 | 0+0 | 0 | 0+1 | 0 |
| 27 | GK | (England) ENG | David Button | 47 | 0 | 46+0 | 0 | 1+0 | 0 | 0+0 | 0 |
| 28 | MF | (China) CHN | Nico Yennaris | 33 | 2 | 28+3 | 2 | 1+0 | 0 | 1+0 | 0 |
| 29 | DF | (France) FRA | Yoann Barbet | 19 | 1 | 18+0 | 1 | 0+0 | 0 | 1+0 | 0 |
| 31 | GK | (England) ENG | Mark Smith | 0 | 0 | 0+0 | 0 | 0+0 | 0 | 0+0 | 0 |
| 36 | DF | (England) ENG | Josh Clarke | 11 | 0 | 3+7 | 0 | 0+0 | 0 | 1+0 | 0 |
| 37 | FW | (England) ENG | Courtney Senior | 1 | 0 | 0+0 | 0 | 0+0 | 0 | 1+0 | 0 |
| 38 | MF | (England) ENG | James Ferry | 0 | 0 | 0+0 | 0 | 0+0 | 0 | 0+0 | 0 |
| 39 | DF | (Republic of Ireland) IRL | Tom Field | 1 | 0 | 1+0 | 0 | 0+0 | 0 | 0+0 | 0 |
| 40 | MF | (England) ENG | Reece Cole | 0 | 0 | 0+0 | 0 | 0+0 | 0 | 0+0 | 0 |
| 47 | MF | (Spain) ESP | Sergi Canós | 39 | 7 | 18+20 | 7 | 1+0 | 0 | 0+0 | 0 |
| 19 | FW | (England) ENG | Andre Gray | 2 | 2 | 1+1 | 2 | 0+0 | 0 | 0+0 | 0 |
| 20 | MF | (France) FRA | Toumani Diagouraga | 27 | 0 | 26+1 | 0 | 0+0 | 0 | 0+0 | 0 |
| 20 | FW | (Uruguay) URU | Leandro Rodríguez | 2 | 0 | 2+0 | 0 | 0+0 | 0 | 0+0 | 0 |
| 26 | DF | (England) ENG | James Tarkowski | 23 | 1 | 23+0 | 1 | 0+0 | 0 | 0+0 | 0 |
| 30 | MF | (England) ENG | Ryan Williams | 1 | 0 | 0+0 | 0 | 0+0 | 0 | 1+0 | 0 |
| 34 | MF | (England) ENG | Josh Laurent | 1 | 0 | 0+0 | 0 | 0+0 | 0 | 1+0 | 0 |
| 35 | MF | (England) ENG | Jermaine Udumaga | 4 | 0 | 0+3 | 0 | 0+0 | 0 | 1+0 | 0 |

Source: brentfordfc.co.uk
Italic: denotes player is no longer with team

=== Goalscorers ===
Last Updated 7 May 2016

| No. | Pos | Player | FLC | FAC | LC | Total |
|---|---|---|---|---|---|---|
| 18 | MF | Alan Judge | 14 | 0 | 0 | 14 |
| 21 | FW | Lasse Vibe | 14 | 0 | 0 | 14 |
| 9 | FW | Scott Hogan | 7 | 0 | 0 | 7 |
| 19 | MF | John Swift | 7 | 0 | 0 | 7 |
| 47 | MF | Sergi Canós | 7 | 0 | 0 | 7 |
| 8 | FW | Marco Djuricin | 4 | 0 | 0 | 4 |
| 11 | FW | Philipp Hofmann | 4 | 0 | 0 | 4 |
| 3 | DF | Jake Bidwell | 3 | 0 | 0 | 3 |
| 7 | MF | Sam Saunders | 3 | 0 | 0 | 3 |
| 15 | MF | Ryan Woods | 2 | 0 | 0 | 2 |
| 28 | MF | Nico Yennaris | 2 | 0 | 0 | 2 |
| 19 | FW | Andre Gray | 2 | 0 | 0 | 2 |
| 22 | DF | Jack O'Connell | 1 | 0 | 0 | 1 |
| 29 | DF | Yoann Barbet | 1 | 0 | 0 | 1 |
| 26 | DF | James Tarkowski | 1 | 0 | 0 | 1 |
| | | Totals | 72 | 0 | 0 | 72 |

Source: brentfordfc.co.uk
Italic: denotes player is no longer with team

=== Disciplinary record ===
Last Updated 7 May 2016

| No. | Pos | Player | Yellow card | Red card |
|---|---|---|---|---|
| 6 | DF | Harlee Dean | 7 | 1 |
| 26 | DF | James Tarkowski | 6 | 1 |
| 29 | DF | Yoann Barbet | 2 | 1 |
| 12 | MF | Alan McCormack | 10 | 0 |
| 15 | MF | Ryan Woods | 7 | 0 |
| 3 | DF | Jake Bidwell | 6 | 0 |
| 20 | MF | Toumani Diagouraga | 6 | 0 |
| 47 | MF | Sergi Canós | 5 | 0 |
| 18 | MF | Alan Judge | 4 | 0 |
| 27 | GK | David Button | 4 | 0 |
| 2 | DF | Maxime Colin | 3 | 0 |
| 8 | FW | Marco Djuricin | 3 | 0 |
| 10 | MF | Josh McEachran | 3 | 0 |
| 22 | DF | Jack O'Connell | 3 | 0 |
| 28 | MF | Nico Yennaris | 3 | 0 |
| 7 | MF | Sam Saunders | 2 | 0 |
| 11 | FW | Philipp Hofmann | 2 | 0 |
| 17 | MF | Konstantin Kerschbaumer | 2 | 0 |
| 19 | MF | John Swift | 1 | 0 |
| 23 | MF | Jota | 1 | 0 |
| 24 | MF | Akaki Gogia | 1 | 0 |
| | | Totals | 81 | 3 |

Source: brentfordfc.co.uk
Italic: denotes player is no longer with team

=== Management ===
Last Updated 7 May 2016

| Name | Nat | From | To | Record All Comps | | | | | Record League | | | | |
| Name | Nat | From | To | P | W | D | L | W % | P | W | D | L | W % |
|---|---|---|---|---|---|---|---|---|---|---|---|---|---|
| Marinus Dijkhuizen | (Netherlands) | 1 June 2015 | 28 September 2015 | 9 | 2 | 2 | 5 | 22.22| | 8 | 2 | 2 | 4 | 25.00 |
| Lee Carsley | (Republic of Ireland) | 28 September 2015 | 30 November 2015 | 10 | 5 | 2 | 3 | 50.00| | 10 | 5 | 2 | 3 | 50.00 |
| Dean Smith | (England) | 30 November 2015 | present | 29 | 12 | 4 | 13 | 41.38| | 28 | 12 | 4 | 12 | 42.86 |

=== Summary ===
Last Updated 7 May 2016

| Games played | 48 (46 Championship, 1 FA Cup, 1 League Cup) |
| Games won | 19 (19 Championship, 0 FA Cup, 0 League Cup) |
| Games drawn | 8 (8 Championship, 0 FA Cup, 0 League Cup) |
| Games lost | 21 (19 Championship, 1 FA Cup, 1 League Cup) |
| Goals scored | 72 (72 Championship, 0 FA Cup, 0 League Cup) |
| Goals conceded | 72 (67 Championship, 1 FA Cup, 4 League Cup) |
| Clean sheets | 8 (8 Championship, 0 FA Cup, 0 League Cup) |
| Yellow cards | 81 (81 Championship, 0 FA Cup, 0 League Cup) |
| Red cards | 3 (3 Championship, 0 FA Cup, 0 League Cup) |
| Worst discipline | 1 red and 7 yellows (Harlee Dean) |
| Biggest league win | 5–1 (vs. Huddersfield Town) |
| Worst league defeat | 0–4 (vs. Sheffield Wednesday) |
| Most appearances | 47 Jake Bidwell & David Button |
| Top scorer (league) | 14 Alan Judge & Lasse Vibe |
| Top scorer (all competitions) | 14 Alan Judge & Lasse Vibe |
