= Philipp Hofmann =

German footballer

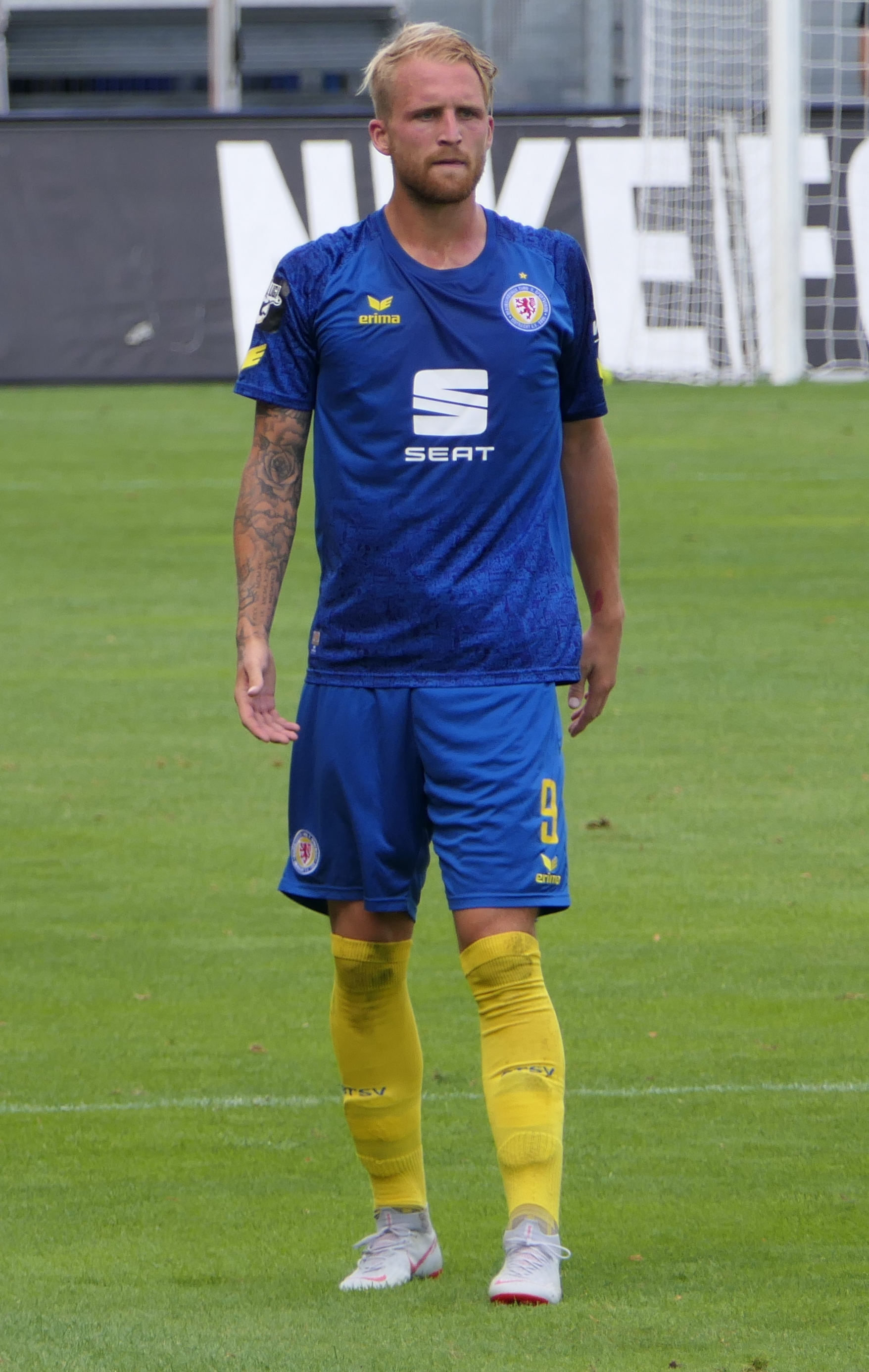
- Hofmann playing for Eintracht Braunschweig in 2018

Personal information
- Full name: Philipp Hofmann
- Date of birth: 30 March 1993 (age 33)
- Place of birth: Arnsberg, Germany
- Height: 1.95 m (6 ft 5 in)
- Position: Forward

Team information
- Current team: VfL Bochum
- Number: 33

Youth career
- 2001–2007: RW Wenholthausen
- 2007–2009: SC Neheim
- 2009–2012: Schalke 04

Senior career*
Years	Team	Apps	(Gls)
2011–2012	Schalke 04 II	24	(6)
2012–2014	Schalke 04	0	(0)
2012–2013	→ SC Paderborn (loan)	30	(6)
2013–2014	→ Ingolstadt (loan)	31	(8)
2013–2014	→ Ingolstadt II (loan)	3	(6)
2014–2015	Kaiserslautern	29	(6)
2014	Kaiserslautern II	2	(1)
2015–2017	Brentford	31	(4)
2017–2018	Greuther Fürth	9	(1)
2017	Greuther Fürth II	3	(2)
2018–2019	Eintracht Braunschweig	50	(11)
2019–2022	Karlsruher SC	96	(49)
2022–	VfL Bochum	130	(28)

International career
2011	Germany U18	3	(0)
2011–2012	Germany U19	10	(6)
2012–2013	Germany U20	4	(2)
2013–2015	Germany U21	17	(9)
- * Club domestic league appearances and goals as of 19:28, 28 August 2026 (UTC)

Philipp Hofmann (born 30 March 1993) is a German professional footballer who plays as a forward for 2. Bundesliga club VfL Bochum.

Hofmann is a product of the Schalke 04 academy and made his professional breakthrough away from the club on loan, before transferring to 1. FC Kaiserslautern in 2014. Following two years in England with Brentford between 2015 and 2017, he returned to Germany and forged a career in the 2. Bundesliga with Greuther Fürth, Eintracht Braunschweig and Karlsruher SC. An average of a goal every other game during three seasons with Karlsruher SC led to a transfer to the Bundesliga with VfL Bochum in 2022. Hofmann scored 18 goals in 36 caps for Germany between U18 and U21 level.

== Club career ==
=== Schalke 04 ===
A forward, Hofmann began his career as a youth with local clubs RW Wenholthausen and SC Neheim, before signing for Bundesliga club Schalke 04 in 2009. He won the Westfalenpokalsieger with the U19 team in the 2010–11 season and the U19 Bundesliga the following year. He made 24 appearances for the reserve team in the 2011–12 season, scoring six goals. Hofmann won his first and only first team call up for a dead rubber Europa League match versus Maccabi Haifa on 14 December 2011 and remained an unused substitute during the 3–0 victory.

Hofmann spent the 2012–13 season on loan with 2. Bundesliga club SC Paderborn 07 and made the first professional appearance of his career in a 4–0 victory over VfL Bochum on 11 August 2012, as a late substitute for Diego Demme. He made 31 appearances and scored six goals during a mid-table season. On 14 July 2013, Hofmann joined 2. Bundesliga club FC Ingolstadt 04 on a two-year loan. He made 33 appearances and scored 9 goals during the 2013–14 season and notably scored two hat-tricks in three Regionalliga Bayern appearances for the reserves. Hofmann's loan was terminated at the end of the 2013–14 season and he departed Schalke on 5 June 2014.

=== 1. FC Kaiserslautern ===
Hofmann transferred to 2. Bundesliga club 1. FC Kaiserslautern on 5 June 2014. He began the 2014–15 season in a substitute role and scored on his debut in a 3–2 win over TSV 1860 Munich on 4 August 2014, scoring the winner just a minute after replacing the scorer of the Red Devils' opening two goals, Srđan Lakić. Hofmann won unfortunate media attention for missing a certain goalscoring opportunity from one yard versus Union Berlin on 24 September, but was spared his blushes after Union failed to cancel out Alexander Ring's first half goal. Hofmann failed to come into regular goalscoring form and finished the 2014–15 season with 32 appearances and 9 goals as the Red Devils finished just two points shy of the promotion playoff place. He departed the Fritz-Walter-Stadion in July 2015.

=== Brentford ===
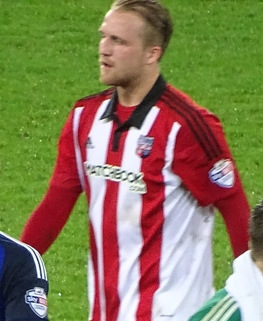
Hofmann playing for Brentford in 2015

On 23 July 2015, Hofmann moved to England to sign a three-year contract with Championship club Brentford, for an undisclosed fee During an injury-hit 2015–16 season, Hofmann scored four goals in 22 appearances. He returned free from injury for the 2016–17 pre-season, but began the season overweight and behind Scott Hogan and Lasse Vibe in competition for the team's lone forward role. After slimming down and making just five substitute appearances by early December 2016, head coach Dean Smith challenged Hofmann to work harder to earn a starting place. Despite the departure of Scott Hogan in January 2017, a niggling back injury and a lack of match fitness rendered Hofmann unable to challenge for a starting berth during the second half of the season. He fell behind B team forward Justin Shaibu in the pecking order and finished the season with 11 appearances and no goals. Hofmann departed Brentford in June 2017, after scoring just four goals in 33 appearances during his two seasons at Griffin Park.

=== Greuther Fürth ===
On 13 June 2017, Hofmann returned to Germany to join 2. Bundesliga club Greuther Fürth on a three-year contract for an undisclosed fee. After recovering from a medial collateral ligament injury suffered during pre-season, he made his debut for the club in a DFB-Pokal first round match versus SV Morlautern on 13 August 2017 and scored two goals in the 5–0 victory. Prior to the winter break, Hofmann made just 11 appearances (scoring three goals) and departed the Sportpark Ronhof prior to the resumption of the 2017–18 season in January 2018.

=== Eintracht Braunschweig ===
On 23 January 2018, Hofmann transferred to 2. Bundesliga club Eintracht Braunschweig on a 2 1/2-year contract. He scored 12 goals in 52 appearances before his departure at the end of the 2018–19 season.

=== Karlsruher SC ===
On 11 June 2019, Hofmann transferred to newly promoted 2. Bundesliga club Karlsruher SC on a two-year contract, with one-year option. He scored 53 goals in 104 appearances during three seasons at the Wildparkstadion and was released when his contract expired at the end of the 2021–22 season.

=== VfL Bochum ===
On 4 May 2022, Hofmann signed a two-year contract with Bundesliga club VfL Bochum on a free transfer, effective 1 July 2022. He made 37 appearances and scored 9 goals during a 2022–23 season in which the club narrowly avoided the relegation playoffs. Hofmann signed a new three-year contract in August 2023 and was added to the team's leadership group. The club finished the 2023–24 season in the relegation playoff place and following an own goal in the 3–0 first leg defeat to Fortuna Düsseldorf, Hofmann scored twice in the second leg to help the club to a 3–3 draw on aggregate. He was substituted prior to the deciding shootout, from which VfL Bochum emerged victorious. Hofmann made 32 appearances and scored six goals during the 2023–24 season.

Hofmann continued in his starting role during the first half of the 2024–25 season. On 14 December 2024 and with Bochum having no remaining substitutions, he played the final minutes of a 1–1 draw versus Union Berlin in goal, due to goalkeeper Patrick Drewes leaving the pitch after being hit by an object thrown from the crowd. Hofmann made 33 appearances and scored three goals prior to suffering a season-ending "quite life-threatening" injury during a 0–0 draw with 1. FC Heidenheim on 2 May 2025. He broke a rib and suffered a collapsed lung in a collision with Marvin Pieringer and his "lung function was only restored after a minor procedure to drain fluid in his chest". In his absence, the club was relegated to the 2. Bundesliga.

Hofmann made 35 appearances and scored 12 goals during a mid-table 2025–26 season. He signed a two-year contract extension in October 2025.

== International career ==
Hofmann represented Germany between U18 and U21 level. He made his international debut for the U18 team in a 3–2 friendly win over France on 22 March 2011, replacing goalscorer Amin Younes in the second half. He made two further U18 appearances before making his U19 debut with a start in a 5–3 friendly win over Belgium on 1 September 2011, being replaced by Niclas Füllkrug at half time. He scored his first international goal in another friendly three days later, with what looked to be the winner versus rivals the Netherlands, before Ouasim Bouy salvaged a 2–2 draw. Hofmann scored six goals in six games during Germany's unsuccessful qualification period for the 2012 European U19 Championship.

Hofmann scored two goals in four friendly appearances for the U20 team during the 2012–13 season and made his U21 debut in a 4–0 2015 European U21 Championship qualifying win over the Republic of Ireland on 9 September 2013. He showed excellent form during the qualifying period, scoring seven goals in 10 games, but he failed to score in his two finals appearances before Germany were humiliated 5–0 by Portugal in the semi-finals. He scored 9 goals in 17 matches at U21 level.

== Personal life ==
Hofmann attended the Gesamtschule Berger Feld.

== Career statistics ==
As of match played 28 August 2026

Appearances and goals by club, season and competition
Club	Season	League			National cup (Note: Includes DFB-Pokal, FA Cup)		League cup (Note: Includes EFL Cup)		Europe		Other		Total	
Club	Season	Division	Apps	Goals	Apps	Goals	Apps	Goals	Apps	Goals	Apps	Goals	Apps	Goals
Schalke 04 II	2011–12	Regionalliga West	24	6	—		—		—		—		24	6
Schalke 04	2011–12	Bundesliga	0	0	0	0	—		0	0	—		0	0
SC Paderborn (loan)	2012–13	2. Bundesliga	30	6	1	0	—		—		—		31	6
FC Ingolstadt (loan)	2013–14	2. Bundesliga	31	8	2	1	—		—		—		33	9
FC Ingolstadt II (loan)	2013–14	Regionalliga Bayern	3	6	—		—		—		—		3	6
1. FC Kaiserslautern II	2014–15	Regionalliga Südwest	2	1	—		—		—		—		2	1
1. FC Kaiserslautern	2014–15	2. Bundesliga	29	6	3	3	—		—		—		32	9
Brentford	2015–16	Championship	21	4	1	0	0	0	—		—		22	4
Brentford	2016–17	Championship	10	0	0	0	1	0	—		—		11	0
Brentford	Total		31	4	1	0	1	0	—		—		33	4
Greuther Fürth	2017–18	2. Bundesliga	9	1	2	2	—		—		—		11	3
Greuther Fürth II	2017–18	Regionalliga Bayern	3	2	—		—		—		—		3	2
Eintracht Braunschweig	2017–18	2. Bundesliga	12	1	—		—		—		—		12	1
Eintracht Braunschweig	2018–19	3. Liga	38	10	1	0	—		—		1 (Note: Appearance in Lower Saxony Cup)	1	40	11
Eintracht Braunschweig	Total		50	11	1	0	—		—		1	1	52	12
Karlsruher SC	2019–20	2. Bundesliga	33	17	3	2	—		—		—		36	19
Karlsruher SC	2020–21	2. Bundesliga	30	13	1	0	—		—		—		31	13
Karlsruher SC	2021–22	2. Bundesliga	33	19	4	2	—		—		—		37	21
Karlsruher SC	Total		96	49	8	4	—		—		—		104	53
VfL Bochum	2022–23	Bundesliga	34	8	3	1	—		—		—		37	9
VfL Bochum	2023–24	Bundesliga	29	4	1	0	—		—		2 (Note: Appearances in Bundesliga relegation play-offs)	2	32	6
VfL Bochum	2024–25	Bundesliga	32	3	1	0	—		—		—		33	3
VfL Bochum	2025–26	2. Bundesliga	32	12	3	0	—		—		—		35	12
VfL Bochum	2026–27	2. Bundesliga	3	1	1	1	—		—		—		4	2
VfL Bochum	Total		130	28	9	2	—		—		2	2	141	32
Career total			438	128	27	12	1	0	0	0	3	3	469	143
