= Jermaine Udumaga =

English footballer

Personal information
- Full name: Chinaemerem Jermaine Udumaga
- Date of birth: 22 June 1995 (age 31)
- Place of birth: Lewisham, England
- Height: 1.76 m (5 ft 9 in)
- Positions: Attacking midfielder; forward

Youth career
- –2011: Charlton Athletic
- 2011–2013: Oxford United
- 2013–2014: Crystal Palace

Senior career*
Years	Team	Apps	(Gls)
2014–2016	Brentford	3	(0)
2015–2016	→ Wycombe Wanderers (loan)	4	(0)
2016	KSF Prespa Birlik	11	(1)
- * Club domestic league appearances and goals

Chinaemerem Jermaine Udumaga (born 22 June 1995) is an English former professional footballer who played as an attacking midfielder. He described himself as "either an eight or a 10 driving from midfield".

== Career ==
=== Early years ===
Born in Lewisham, Udumaga began his career in the youth system at nearby club Charlton Athletic, before moving League Two club Oxford United in 2011 and signing scholarship forms in February 2012. He joined Premier League club Newcastle United on trial in 2012, before signing for Championship club Crystal Palace towards the end of the 2012–13 season.

=== Brentford ===
Towards the end of the 2013–14 season, Udumaga joined League One club Brentford on trial. After impressing for the Development Squad, he signed a one-year professional contract with the newly promoted Championship club in June 2014. After eight goals and almost as many assists for the Development Squad during the first half of the 2014–15 season, Udumaga was rewarded with his maiden call into the first team squad for a league match versus former club Charlton Athletic on 14 February 2015 and remained an unused substitute during the 3–0 defeat. On 26 February, it was announced that Udumaga had signed a new one-year contract. Udumaga was called into the first team squad for three late-season games and finished the season as top scorer for the Development Squad, with 12 goals in 24 appearances.

Udumaga continued his involvement with the first team into 2015–16 pre-season, being included in the squad for a training camp in Portugal in July and scoring in friendlies versus S.C. Farense and Tottenham Hotspur. He made his senior debut with a start in a League Cup first round match versus former club Oxford United on 11 August, playing the full 90 minutes of the 4–0 defeat. A spate of transfers away from Griffin Park and an injury crisis saw Udumaga hold onto his place in the squad and he made three further substitute appearances over the course of the following month.

On 26 November 2015, Udumaga joined League Two club Wycombe Wanderers on a one-month loan. Despite so far failing to make an appearance, his loan was later extended by a further month. Udumaga finally made his Chairboys debut as a substitute for Paul Hayes late in a 2–0 win over Crawley Town on 28 December. He made three further appearances before returning to Brentford when his loan expired.

Despite still making regular appearances for the Development Squad, Udumaga requested his contract be cancelled prior to the end of the 2015–16 season. During two years with the Bees, he made four first team appearances and scored 14 goals in 42 appearances for the Development Squad.

=== KSF Prespa Birlik ===
On 6 August 2016, Udumaga was announced as having joined Swedish Division 1 Södra club KSF Prespa Birlik. He scored one goal in 11 appearances before departing the club.

== Career statistics ==
Appearances and goals by club, season and competition
Club	Season	League			National cup (Note: Includes FA Cup)		League cup (Note: Includes Football League Cup)		Other		Total	
Club	Season	Division	Apps	Goals	Apps	Goals	Apps	Goals	Apps	Goals	Apps	Goals
Brentford	2014–15	Championship	0	0	0	0	0	0	0	0	0	0
Brentford	2015–16	Championship	3	0	—		1	0	—		4	0
Brentford	Total		3	0	0	0	1	0	0	0	4	0
Wycombe Wanderers (loan)	2015–16	League Two	4	0	0	0	—		—		4	0
KSF Prespa Birlik	2016	Division 1 Södra	11	1	—		—		—		11	1
Career total			18	1	0	0	1	0	0	0	19	1
