= James Ferry (footballer) =

English footballer

Personal information
- Full name: James Patrick Ferry
- Date of birth: 20 April 1997 (age 29)
- Place of birth: Enfield, England
- Height: 1.87 m (6 ft 2 in)
- Position: Central midfielder

Youth career
- 2011–2015: Brentford

Senior career*
Years	Team	Apps	(Gls)
2015–2017	Brentford	0	(0)
2015	→ Wycombe Wanderers (loan)	0	(0)
2016	→ Welling United (loan)	7	(0)
2017–2019	Stevenage	12	(0)
2017–2018	→ Nuneaton Town (loan)	22	(2)
2018–2019	→ FC Halifax Town (loan)	10	(2)
2019	Woking	6	(0)
2019–2021	Eastbourne Borough	61	(2)
- * Club domestic league appearances and goals

James Patrick Ferry (born 20 April 1997) is an English retired semi-professional footballer who played as a central midfielder. He is a product of the Brentford academy and played in the EFL for Stevenage, before dropping into non-League football in 2019 and retiring from football in 2021.

== Career ==
=== Brentford ===
Ferry began his youth career at Brentford and captained the Bees' U15 team during the 2012 Milk Cup, leading the side to victory in the Junior category. Despite missing much of the 2012–13 season with injury, he signed a scholarship deal in May 2013. He made 33 appearances and scored six goals during his two seasons as a scholar and captained the youth team to the 2014–15 Professional U18 Development League 2 Final.

Ferry signed a one-year Development Squad contract in June 2015 and began the 2015–16 season as a near ever-present in the Professional U21 Development League 2 South, impressing enough to sign a new one-year contract extension in November 2015. On 26 November 2015, Ferry joined League Two club Wycombe Wanderers on a one-month loan, but failed to win a call into a squad before his loan expired. Ferry joined National League strugglers Welling United on a one-month loan on 28 January 2016 and made seven appearances before his loan expired.

Ferry received his maiden call into a Brentford first team squad for a Championship match versus Ipswich Town on 9 April 2016 and remained an unused substitute during the 3–1 victory. He was a regular in the B team during the 2016–17 season and helped the team to win the Kai Thor Cup, but failed to win any further first team call ups before departing Griffin Park in May 2017.

=== Stevenage ===
On 12 May 2017, Ferry joined League Two club Stevenage on a two-year contract for an undisclosed fee. He made three EFL Trophy appearances before joining National League North club Nuneaton Town on a one-month loan on 15 December 2017. The loan was later extended until the end of the season. On 27 February 2018, Ferry scored the first senior goal of his career with the opener in a 2–1 victory over A.F.C. Telford United. He finished his spell with 22 appearances and two goals.

Ferry was a regular inclusion in the first team squad during the first three months of the 2018–19 season and made 15 appearances, mostly as a substitute, before joining National League club FC Halifax Town on a 93-day loan on 15 December 2018. He made 12 appearances and scored two goals during his spell. Shortly after his return in March 2019, he transferred away from Stevenage. In just under two seasons with the club, Ferry made 18 appearances.

=== Woking ===
On 28 March 2019, Ferry joined high-flying National League South club Woking on a contract until the end of the 2018–19 season. He made six appearances in what remained of the regular season, but did not feature in the Cards' successful playoff campaign. Ferry was released at the end of the season.

=== Eastbourne Borough ===
On 21 June 2019, Ferry joined National League South club Eastbourne Borough on a one-year contract. He made 64 appearances and scored two goals during the 2019–20 and 2020–21 seasons, both of which were abandoned due to COVID-19. Ferry was retained for the 2021–22 season. On 5 December 2021, Ferry mutually agreed to terminate his contract with Eastbourne after struggling with the commute from his West London home. He ended his 2 1/2-year career with the club on 77 appearances and two goals and subsequently retired from football due to work commitments.

== Personal life ==
Ferry attended Enfield Grammar School.

== Career statistics ==
Appearances and goals by club, season and competition
Club	Season	League			FA Cup		League Cup		Other		Total	
Club	Season	Division	Apps	Goals	Apps	Goals	Apps	Goals	Apps	Goals	Apps	Goals
Brentford	2015–16	Championship	0	0	0	0	0	0	—		0	0
Welling United (loan)	2015–16	National League	7	0	—		—		—		7	0
Stevenage	2017–18	League Two	0	0	0	0	0	0	3 (Note: Appearances in EFL Trophy)	0	3	0
Stevenage	2018–19	League Two	12	0	0	0	1	0	2	0	15	0
Stevenage	Total		12	0	0	0	1	0	5	0	18	0
Nuneaton Town (loan)	2017–18	National League North	22	2	—		—		0	0	22	2
FC Halifax Town (loan)	2018–19	National League	10	2	—		—		2 (Note: Appearance(s) in FA Trophy)	0	12	2
Woking	2018–19	National League South	6	0	—		—		0	0	6	0
Eastbourne Borough	2019–20	National League South	32	2	2	0	—		6 (Note: 3 appearances in FA Trophy, 3 appearances in Sussex Senior Challenge Cup)	0	40	2
Eastbourne Borough	2020–21	National League South	19	0	4	0	—		1	0	24	0
Eastbourne Borough	2021–22	National League South	10	0	1	0	—		1	0	11	0
Eastbourne Borough	Total		61	2	7	0	—		8	0	77	2
Career total			118	6	7	0	1	0	15	0	142	6
