= 2020–21 Wolverhampton Wanderers F.C. season =

English football club season

Wolverhampton Wanderers F.C.
2020–21 season
- Chairman: Jeff Shi
- Head coach: Nuno Espírito Santo
- Stadium: Molineux
- Premier League: 13th
- FA Cup: Fifth round
- EFL Cup: Second round
- Top goalscorer: League: Pedro Neto and Rúben Neves (5 each); All: Pedro Neto and Rúben Neves (5 each)
- Highest home attendance: 4,500 vs Manchester United (23 May 2021, Premier League)
- Lowest home attendance: 4,500 vs Manchester United (23 May 2021, Premier League)
- Average home league attendance: 4,500
Home colours	Away colours	Third colours

The 2020–21 season was the 143rd season in the history of the English football club Wolverhampton Wanderers. The club competed in the Premier League for the third consecutive season and also participated in this season's edition of the FA Cup and EFL Cup.

The entire season took place against the backdrop of the global COVID-19 pandemic, which necessitated the players' compliance with strict restrictions on contact as well as a lack of fans at all Wolves' home matches until the final day of the campaign. The team also had to contend with several long-term injuries, including the leading goalscorer of the previous seasons, Raúl Jiménez, who suffered a fractured skull during an aerial collision in a 2–1 win at Arsenal on 29 November 2020.

With this victory, the team moved into 6th place in the table, but their results deteriorated afterward in Jiménez's absence for the remainder of the campaign and they eventually finished in 13th place, representing a decline compared to the previous two seventh-place finishes. Two days prior to the end of the league season, the club had announced that head coach Nuno Espírito Santo would be leaving by "mutual consent" after the final game following four years at the helm.

== Competitions ==
=== Premier League ===
A total of 20 teams competed in the Premier League in the 2020–21 season. Each team played every other team twice, once at their stadium, and once at the opposition's. Three points were awarded to teams for each win, one point per draw, and none for defeats.

==== League table ====
Pos	Team	Pld	W	D	L	GF	GA	GD	Pts
11	Aston Villa	38	16	7	15	55	46	+9	55
12	Newcastle United	38	12	9	17	46	62	−16	45
13	Wolverhampton Wanderers	38	12	9	17	36	52	−16	45
14	Crystal Palace	38	12	8	18	41	66	−25	44
15	Southampton	38	12	7	19	47	68	−21	43

Source: Premier League
Rules for classification: 1) Points; 2) Goal difference; 3) Goals scored; 4) If the champions, relegated teams or qualified teams for UEFA competitions cannot be determined by rules 1 to 3, rules 4.1 to 4.3 are applied – 4.1) Points gained in head-to-head record between such teams; 4.2) Away goals scored in head-to-head record between such teams; 4.3) Play-offs

==== Results summary ====
Overall								Home						Away					
Pld	W	D	L	GF	GA	GD	Pts	W	D	L	GF	GA	GD	W	D	L	GF	GA	GD
38	12	9	17	36	52	−16	45	7	4	8	21	25	−4	5	5	9	15	27	−12

Last updated: 23 May 2021.
Source: Premier League

==== Results by matchday ====
Matchday	1	2	3	4	5	6	7	8	9	10	11	12	13	14	15	16	17	18	19	20	21	22	23	24	25	26	27	28	29	30	31	32	33	34	35	36	37	38
Ground	A	H	A	H	A	H	H	A	H	A	A	H	H	A	H	A	A	H	H	A	A	H	H	A	H	A	A	A	H	H	A	H	H	A	H	A	A	H
Result	W	L	L	W	W	D	W	L	D	W	L	L	W	L	D	L	D	L	L	D	L	W	D	W	W	D	L	D	L	L	W	W	L	D	W	L	L	L
Position	5	12	16	13	6	9	6	9	9	7	10	13	10	11	11	12	13	14	14	13	14	14	14	12	11	12	12	12	13	14	12	12	12	12	12	12	12	13

Updated to match(es) played on 23 May 2021. Source: Premier League
A = Away; H = Home; W = Win; D = Draw; L = Loss

==== Matches ====
The provisional fixture list was released on 20 August 2020, but was subject to change in the event of matches being selected for television coverage or police concerns.

14 September 2020 1	Sheffield United	0–2	Wolverhampton Wanderers	Sheffield
18:00 BST	Egan (yellow card) 33'; McBurnie (yellow card) 39'	Report	Jiménez 3'; Saïss 6'; Marçal (yellow card) 90'	Stadium: Bramall Lane; Attendance: 0 (Note: Played behind closed doors due to social distancing restrictions in the wake of the COVID-19 pandemic.); Referee: Mike Dean

21 September 2020 2	Wolverhampton Wanderers	1–3	Manchester City	Wolverhampton
20:15 BST	Jiménez 78'	Report	De Bruyne 20' (pen.); Foden 32'; Gabriel Jesus (yellow card) 35', (goal) 90+5'; Mendy (yellow card) 35'; Rodri (yellow card) 86'	Stadium: Molineux; Attendance: 0 Referee: Andre Marriner

27 September 2020 3	West Ham United	4–0	Wolverhampton Wanderers	Stratford, London
19:00 BST	Bowen 17', 57'; Jiménez 66' (o.g.); Haller 90+3'	Report	Coady (yellow card) 51'	Stadium: London Stadium; Attendance: 0 Referee: Martin Atkinson

4 October 2020 4	Wolverhampton Wanderers	1–0	Fulham	Wolverhampton
14:00 BST	Neto 56'; Neves (yellow card) 90+2'	Report	Le Marchand (yellow card) 79'	Stadium: Molineux; Attendance: 0 Referee: Darren England

19 October 2020 5	Leeds United	0–1	Wolverhampton Wanderers	Leeds
20:00 BST	Ayling (yellow card) 15'; Phillips (yellow card) 61'	Report	Moutinho (yellow card) 66'; Jiménez 70'	Stadium: Elland Road; Attendance: 0 Referee: David Coote

25 October 2020 6	Wolverhampton Wanderers	1–1	Newcastle United	Wolverhampton
16:30 GMT	Jiménez 80'	Report	Almirón (yellow card) 40'; Murphy 89'	Stadium: Molineux; Attendance: 0 Referee: Lee Mason

30 October 2020 7	Wolverhampton Wanderers	2–0	Crystal Palace	Wolverhampton
20:00 GMT	Aït-Nouri 18'; Podence 27'	Report	Van Aanholt (yellow card) 45'; Zaha (yellow card) 62'; Milivojević (red card) 86'	Stadium: Molineux; Attendance: 0 Referee: Martin Atkinson

8 November 2020 8	Leicester City	1–0	Wolverhampton Wanderers	Leicester
14:00 GMT	Vardy 15' (pen.) (penalty missed) 38'; Evans (yellow card) 63'; Fofana (yellow card) 81'	Report	Dendoncker (yellow card) 41'; Neves (yellow card) 50'; Kilman (yellow card) 90+3'	Stadium: King Power Stadium; Attendance: 0 Referee: Anthony Taylor

23 November 2020 9	Wolverhampton Wanderers	1–1	Southampton	Wolverhampton
20:00 GMT	Neves (yellow card) 44'; Traoré (yellow card) 45+2'; Neto 75'	Report	Walcott 58'	Stadium: Molineux; Attendance: 0 Referee: Andre Marriner

29 November 2020 10	Arsenal	1–2	Wolverhampton Wanderers	Holloway, London
19:15 GMT	Gabriel 30'; Bellerín (yellow card) 69'; Holding (yellow card) 86'; Tierney (yellow card) 90+2'	Report	Neto 27'; Podence 42'; Boly (yellow card) 47'; Traoré (yellow card) 54'; Silva (yellow card) 56'; Coady (yellow card) 89'	Stadium: Emirates Stadium; Attendance: 0 Referee: Michael Oliver

6 December 2020 11	Liverpool	4–0	Wolverhampton Wanderers	Liverpool
19:15 GMT	N. Williams (yellow card) 3'; Salah 24'; Wijnaldum 58'; Matip 67'; Semedo 78' (o.g.)	Report	Moutinho (yellow card) 89'	Stadium: Anfield; Attendance: 2,000; Referee: Craig Pawson

12 December 2020 12	Wolverhampton Wanderers	0–1	Aston Villa	Wolverhampton
12:30 GMT	Traoré (yellow card) 43'; Dendoncker (yellow card) 77'; Moutinho (yellow card) 83' (yellow-red card) 90+5'	Report	Douglas Luiz (yellow card) 14' (yellow-red card) 85'; Cash (yellow card) 29'; McGinn (yellow card) 30'; Targett (yellow card) 81'; Konsa (yellow card) 81'; Grealish (yellow card) 88'; El Ghazi 90+4' (pen.)	Stadium: Molineux; Attendance: 0 Referee: Mike Dean

15 December 2020 13	Wolverhampton Wanderers	2–1	Chelsea	Wolverhampton
18:00 GMT	Podence 66', (yellow card) 77'; Semedo (yellow card) 90+4'; Neto 90+5'	Report	Giroud 49'; Mount (yellow card) 60'; Kanté (yellow card) 85'	Stadium: Molineux; Attendance: 0 Referee: Stuart Attwell

21 December 2020 14	Burnley	2–1	Wolverhampton Wanderers	Burnley
17:30 GMT	Barnes 35'; Westwood (yellow card) 37'; Wood 51'; Rodriguez (yellow card) 90+4'	Report	Otasowie (yellow card) 45+1'; Silva 89' (pen.)	Stadium: Turf Moor; Attendance: 0 Referee: Lee Mason

27 December 2020 15	Wolverhampton Wanderers	1–1	Tottenham Hotspur	Wolverhampton
19:15 GMT	Podence (yellow card) 46'; Coady (yellow card) 58'; Marçal (yellow card) 68'; Semedo (yellow card) 70'; Saïss 86'	Report	Ndombele 1'; Winks (yellow card) 45+1'	Stadium: Molineux; Attendance: 0 Referee: Paul Tierney

29 December 2020 16	Manchester United	1–0	Wolverhampton Wanderers	Greater Manchester
20:00 GMT	Rashford (yellow card) 50', (goal) 90+3'	Report	Patrício (yellow card) 73'	Stadium: Old Trafford; Attendance: 0 Referee: Jon Moss

2 January 2021 17	Brighton & Hove Albion	3–3	Wolverhampton Wanderers	Brighton
17:30 GMT	Connolly 13'; Bissouma (yellow card) 22'; Maupay 46' (pen.); Burn (yellow card) 58'; Dunk 70'	Report	Saïss 19'; Burn 34' (o.g.); Neves 44' (pen.); Semedo (yellow card) 90+1'	Stadium: Falmer Stadium; Attendance: 0 Referee: Andrew Madley

12 January 2021 18	Wolverhampton Wanderers	1–2	Everton	Wolverhampton
20:15 GMT	Neves 14'; Semedo (yellow card) 89'; Hoever (yellow card) 90+5'	Report	Iwobi 6'; Doucouré (yellow card) 50'; Holgate (yellow card) 69'; Keane 77'	Stadium: Molineux; Attendance: 0 Referee: Martin Atkinson

16 January 2021 19	Wolverhampton Wanderers	2–3	West Bromwich Albion	Wolverhampton
12:30 GMT	Silva 38', (yellow card) 90'; Boly 43'; Dendoncker (yellow card) 73'	Report	Pereira 8' (pen.), 56' (pen.); Ajayi (yellow card) 36', (goal) 52'	Stadium: Molineux; Attendance: 0 Referee: Michael Oliver

27 January 2021 20	Chelsea	0–0	Wolverhampton Wanderers	London
18:00 GMT	Chilwell (yellow card) 62'	Report	Neto (yellow card) 51'	Stadium: Stamford Bridge; Attendance: 0 Referee: Andrew Madley

30 January 2021 21	Crystal Palace	1–0	Wolverhampton Wanderers	Selhurst, London
15:00 GMT	Eze 60'; Zaha (yellow card) 90'	Report	Kilman (yellow card) 84'; Coady (yellow card) 90'	Stadium: Selhurst Park; Attendance: 0 Referee: Simon Hooper

2 February 2021 22	Wolverhampton Wanderers	2–1	Arsenal	Wolverhampton
18:00 GMT	Moutinho (yellow card) 13', (goal) 49'; Kilman (yellow card) 28'; Neves 45+5' (pen.), (yellow card) 48'	Report	Pépé 32'; Partey (yellow card) 41'; David Luiz (red card) 45+3'; Xhaka (yellow card) 62'; Leno (red card) 72'	Stadium: Molineux; Attendance: 0 Referee: Craig Pawson

7 February 2021 23	Wolverhampton Wanderers	0–0	Leicester City	Wolverhampton
14:00 GMT	Neves (yellow card) 45+1'	Report	Evans (yellow card) 32'; Söyüncü (yellow card) 54'; Maddison (yellow card) 62'	Stadium: Molineux; Attendance: 0 Referee: Martin Atkinson

14 February 2021 24	Southampton	1–2	Wolverhampton Wanderers	Southampton
12:00 GMT	Romeu (yellow card) 17'; Ings 25'; Bednarek (yellow card) 61'	Report	Neves 53' (pen.); Saïss (yellow card) 54'; Neto 66', (yellow card) 90'	Stadium: St Mary's Stadium; Attendance: 0 Referee: Graham Scott

19 February 2021 25	Wolverhampton Wanderers	1–0	Leeds United	Wolverhampton
20:00 GMT	Meslier 64' (o.g.); Neto (yellow card) 90+1'	Report		Stadium: Molineux; Attendance: 0 Referee: David Coote

27 February 2021 26	Newcastle United	1–1	Wolverhampton Wanderers	Newcastle upon Tyne
20:00 GMT	Hayden (yellow card) 19'; Clark (yellow card) 43'; Lascelles 52'	Report	Neves 73'	Stadium: St James' Park; Attendance: 0 Referee: Mike Dean

2 March 2021 27	Manchester City	4–1	Wolverhampton Wanderers	Manchester
20:00 GMT	Dendoncker 15' (o.g.); Gabriel Jesus 80', 90+3'; Mahrez 90'	Report	Coady 61'; Neto (yellow card) 71'	Stadium: Etihad Stadium; Attendance: 0 Referee: Chris Kavanagh

6 March 2021 28	Aston Villa	0–0	Wolverhampton Wanderers	Birmingham
17:30 GMT	Sanson (yellow card) 27'	Report		Stadium: Villa Park; Attendance: 0 Referee: Andrew Madley

15 March 2021 29	Wolverhampton Wanderers	0–1	Liverpool	Wolverhampton
20:00 GMT	Neves (yellow card) 37'; Saïss (yellow card) 52'	Report	Thiago (yellow card) 42'; Jota 45+2'	Stadium: Molineux; Attendance: 0 Referee: Craig Pawson

5 April 2021 30	Wolverhampton Wanderers	2–3	West Ham United	Wolverhampton
20:15 BST	Dendoncker 44'; Silva 68'; Neves (yellow card) 85'	Report	Dawson (yellow card) 4'; Lingard 6', (yellow card) 90+3'; Diop (yellow card) 10'; Fornals 14'; Bowen 38'; Souček (yellow card) 90+1'	Stadium: Molineux; Attendance: 0 Referee: Michael Oliver

9 April 2021 31	Fulham	0–1	Wolverhampton Wanderers	Fulham
20:00 BST		Report	Traoré 90+3'	Stadium: Craven Cottage; Attendance: 0 Referee: Jon Moss

17 April 2021 32	Wolverhampton Wanderers	1–0	Sheffield United	Wolverhampton
20:15 BST	Willian José 59'; Podence (yellow card) 71'	Report	Brewster (yellow card) 36'; Stevens (yellow card) 82'	Stadium: Molineux; Attendance: 0 Referee: Robert Jones

25 April 2021 33	Wolverhampton Wanderers	0–4	Burnley	Wolverhampton
12:00 BST	Traoré (yellow card) 39'	Report	Wood 15', 21', 44'; Tarkowski (yellow card) 39'; Lowton (yellow card) 42'; Westwood 85'	Stadium: Molineux; Attendance: 0 Referee: Darren England

3 May 2021 34	West Bromwich Albion	1–1	Wolverhampton Wanderers	West Bromwich
18:00 BST	Diagne 62'; Maitland-Niles (yellow card) 69'; Furlong (yellow card) 88'	Report	Silva 45+2'	Stadium: The Hawthorns; Attendance: 0 Referee: Mike Dean

9 May 2021 35	Wolverhampton Wanderers	2–1	Brighton & Hove Albion	Wolverhampton
12:00 BST	Traoré 76'; Kilman (yellow card) 80'; Coady (yellow card) 83'; Gibbs-White 90'	Report	Dunk 13', (red card) 53'; Sánchez (yellow card) 85'; Bissouma (yellow card) 90+2'; Maupay (red card) 90+7'	Stadium: Molineux; Attendance: 0 Referee: Jon Moss

16 May 2021 36	Tottenham Hotspur	2–0	Wolverhampton Wanderers	Tottenham
14:05 BST	Kane 45'; Højbjerg 62'; Tanganga (yellow card) 86'	Report		Stadium: The Tottenham Hotspur Stadium; Attendance: 0 Referee: Martin Atkinson

19 May 2021 37	Everton	1–0	Wolverhampton Wanderers	Liverpool
18:00 BST	Richarlison 48'	Report	Semedo (yellow card) 80'	Stadium: Goodison Park; Attendance: 6,068; Referee: Andrew Madley

23 May 2021 38	Wolverhampton Wanderers	1–2	Manchester United	Wolverhampton
16:00 BST	Semedo 39'; Aït-Nouri (yellow card) 41'; Dendoncker (yellow card) 41'; Boly (yellow card) 75'; Gibbs-White (yellow card) 90+6'	Report	Elanga 13'; Mata 45+4' (pen.); Henderson (yellow card) 56'	Stadium: Molineux; Attendance: 4,500; Referee: Mike Dean

=== FA Cup ===
The third round draw was made on 30 November, with Premier League and EFL Championship clubs all entering the competition. The draw for the fourth and fifth round were made on 11 January, conducted by Peter Crouch.

8 January 2021 Third round	Wolverhampton Wanderers	1–0	Crystal Palace	Wolverhampton
19:45 GMT	Traoré 35'; Aït-Nouri (yellow card) 66'; Gibbs-White (yellow card) 85'	Report	McCarthy (yellow card) 62'	Stadium: Molineux; Attendance: 0 Referee: David Coote

22 January 2021 Fourth round	Chorley	0–1	Wolverhampton Wanderers	Chorley
19:45 GMT	Tomlinson (yellow card) 36'; Birch (yellow card) 86'; Cardwell (yellow card) 89'	Report	Vitinha 12'; Coady (yellow card) 63'	Stadium: Victory Park; Attendance: 0 Referee: Anthony Taylor

11 February 2021 Fifth round	Wolverhampton Wanderers	0–2	Southampton	Wolverhampton
17:30 GMT	Gibbs-White (yellow card) 59'; Traoré (yellow card) 90+2'	Report	Ings 49'; Walker-Peters (yellow card) 52'; Romeu (yellow card) 88'; Armstrong 90'	Stadium: Molineux; Attendance: 0 Referee: Jon Moss

=== EFL Cup ===
As a Premier League team, Wolves entered the competition at the second round stage, which was drawn on 6 September.

17 September 2020 Second round	Wolverhampton Wanderers	0–1	Stoke City	Wolverhampton
19:00 BST		Report	Brown 86'; McClean (yellow card) 88'	Stadium: Molineux; Attendance: 0 Referee: Simon Hooper

=== EFL Trophy ===
Wolves were one of the sixteen teams from outside the bottom two divisions of the Football League to be invited to field their academy team in the competition due to it holding Category 1 academy status. They were drawn into Group F in the Northern section.
Note: In group stage matches which were level at the end of 90 minutes, a penalty shoot-out was held, with the winner earning a bonus point.

22 September 2020 Group F (N)	Oldham Athletic	4–0	Wolverhampton Wanderers U21	Oldham
19:45 BST	Rowe 42'; Hough (yellow card) 57'; Badan (yellow card) 58'; Barnett (yellow card) 64'; Grant 85'; McAleny 88', 90+1'	Report		Stadium: Boundary Park; Attendance: 0

6 October 2020 Group F (N)	Bradford City	1–1 (3–5 p)	Wolverhampton Wanderers U21	Bradford
19:30 BST	Cousin-Dawson (yellow card) 4'; Donaldson 83'	Report	Sanderson (yellow card) 57'; Samuels 60'	Stadium: Utilita Energy Stadium; Attendance: 0 Referee: Carl Boyeson
	Penalties
	Pritchard (penalty scored); Hosannah (penalty scored); Shanks (penalty missed); Scales (penalty scored)		(penalty scored) Samuels; (penalty scored) Hoever; (penalty scored) Shabani; (penalty scored) Corbeanu; (penalty scored) Sanderson

10 November 2020 Group F (N)	Doncaster Rovers	1–2	Wolverhampton Wanderers U21	Doncaster
19:30 GMT	Okenabirhie 23' (pen.); Amos (yellow card) 40'; Wright (yellow card) 68'	Report	Silva 15', 88'	Stadium: Keepmoat Stadium; Attendance: 0 Referee: James Oldham

8 December 2020 Second round (N)	Port Vale	2–1	Wolverhampton Wanderers U21	Burslem
19:00 GMT	McKirdy 26'; Brisley (yellow card) 63'; Mills 80'	Report	Perry 19'	Stadium: Vale Park; Attendance: 0 Referee: Scott Oldham

== Players ==
=== Statistics ===
Key:
‡ On loan from another club * First appearance(s) for the club

- # = Squad number
- Pos = Playing position
- P = Number of games played
- G = Number of goals scored
- GK = Goalkeeper
- DF = Defender
- MF = Midfielder
- FW = Forward
- = Yellow cards
- = Red cards
- † Permanent player left club during the season
- ¤ Loaned to another club for part or all of season

Correct as of 23 May 2021. Starting appearances are listed first, followed by substitute appearances in parentheses where applicable.

No.	Pos	Name	P	G	P	G	P	G	P	G	A yellow card	A red card	Notes
No.	Pos	Name	League		FA Cup		League Cup		Total		Discipline		Notes
2	DF	(Netherlands) Ki-Jana Hoever	5(7)	0	2(1)	0	0	0	7(8)	0	1	0	
3	DF	(France) Rayan Aït-Nouri ‡	16(5)	1	2(1)	0	0	0	18(6)	1	2	0	
5	DF	(Brazil) Marçal	7(6)	0	0	0	0	0	7(6)	0	2	0	
7	FW	(Portugal) Pedro Neto	30(1)	5	1(2)	0	0(1)	0	31(4)	5	4	0	
8	MF	(Portugal) Rúben Neves	30(5)	5	2(1)	0	1	0	34(6)	5	7	0	
9	FW	(Mexico) Raúl Jiménez	10	4	0	0	0(1)	0	10(1)	4	0	0	
10	FW	(Portugal) Daniel Podence	22(2)	3	0	0	0(1)	0	22(3)	3	3	0	
11	GK	(Portugal) Rui Patrício	37	0	0	0	0	0	37	0	1	0	
12	FW	(Brazil) Willian José ‡	12(5)	1	0(1)	0	0	0	12(6)	1	0	0	
15	DF	(Ivory Coast) Willy Boly	21	1	1	0	1	0	23	1	2	0	
16	DF	(England) Conor Coady	37	1	2	0	1	0	40	1	6	0	
17	FW	(Portugal) Fábio Silva	11(21)	4	3	0	1	0	15(21)	4	2	0	
18	FW	(Portugal) Diogo Jota †	0	0	0	0	0	0	0	0	0	0	
18	MF	(England) Morgan Gibbs-White ¤	4(7)	1	1(1)	0	0	0	5(8)	1	3	0	
19	DF	(Spain) Jonny	7	0	1	0	0	0	8	0	0	0	
20	MF	(Portugal) Vitinha ‡	5(14)	0	2	1	1	0	8(14)	1	0	0	
21	GK	(England) John Ruddy	1(1)	0	3	0	1	0	5(1)	0	0	0	
22	DF	(Portugal) Nélson Semedo	34	1	1	0	0	0	35	1	5	0	
23	FW	(Italy) Patrick Cutrone ¤	0(2)	0	1(1)	0	0	0	1(3)	0	0	0	
26	MF	(England) Taylor Perry	0	0	0	0	0	0	0	0	0	0	
27	MF	(Morocco) Romain Saïss	27	3	2	0	1	0	30	3	2	0	
28	MF	(Portugal) João Moutinho	28(5)	1	3	0	0	0	31(5)	1	4	1	(Note: Moutinho was suspended vs Chelsea (h) due to receiving a second yellow card vs Aston Villa (h).)
29	DF	(Portugal) Rúben Vinagre ¤	1(1)	0	0	0	1	0	2(1)	0	0	0	
32	MF	(Belgium) Leander Dendoncker	29(5)	1	3	0	1	0	33(5)	1	4	0	
37	FW	(Spain) Adama Traoré	29(7)	2	1(2)	1	1	0	31(9)	3	5	0	
38	MF	(Kosovo) Meritan Shabani ¤	0	0	0	0	0	0	0	0	0	0	
39	MF	(England) Luke Cundle	0	0	0	0	0	0	0	0	0	0	
42	DF	(Republic of Ireland) Lewis Richards	0	0	0	0	0	0	0	0	0	0	
49	DF	(England) Max Kilman	14(4)	0	2	0	0	0	16(4)	0	4	0	
54	MF	(United States) Owen Otasowie	2(4)	0	0	0	0	0	2(4)	0	1	0	
57	DF	(Netherlands) Nigel Lonwijk	0	0	0	0	0	0	0	0	0	0	
59	DF	(Denmark) Oskar Buur ¤	0(1)	0	0	0	1	0	1(1)	0	0	0	
60	FW	(Canada) Theo Corbeanu	0(1)	0	0	0	0	0	0(1)	0	0	0	
62	GK	(Denmark) Andreas Søndergaard	0	0	0	0	0	0	0	0	0	0	
64	DF	(Spain) Hugo Bueno	0	0	0	0	0	0	0	0	0	0	
75	DF	(Switzerland) Christian Marques	0	0	0	0	0	0	0	0	0	0	

=== Awards ===
Award	Winner
Fans' Player of the Season	Pedro Neto
Players' Player of the Season	Pedro Neto
Young Player of the Season	Fábio Silva
Academy Player of the Season	Owen Hesketh
Goal of the Season	João Moutinho (vs Arsenal, 2 February 2021)

== Transfers ==
=== Transfers in ===
Date	Position	Nationality	Name	From	Fee	Team	Ref.
27 July 2020	GK	(Montenegro)	Matija Sarkic	(England) Aston Villa	Free transfer	First team	
31 July 2020	LB	(England)	Aaron Keto-Diyawa	(England) Fulham	Free transfer	Academy	
2 September 2020	LB	(Portugal)	Toti	(Portugal) Estoril Praia	Undisclosed	Under-23s	
5 September 2020	CF	(Portugal)	Fábio Silva	(Portugal) Porto	£35,000,000	First team	
6 September 2020	LB	(Brazil)	Marçal	(France) Lyon	Undisclosed	First team	
19 September 2020	RB	(Netherlands)	Ki-Jana Hoever	(England) Liverpool	Undisclosed	First team	
23 September 2020	RB	(Portugal)	Nélson Semedo	(Spain) Barcelona	£30,000,000	First team	

=== Loans in ===
Date	Position	Nationality	Name	From	Date Until	Team	Ref.
9 September 2020	CM	(Portugal)	Vitinha	(Portugal) Porto	End of season	First team	
4 October 2020	LB	(France)	Rayan Aït-Nouri	(France) Angers	End of season	First team	
23 January 2021	FW	(Brazil)	Willian José	(Spain) Real Sociedad	End of season	First team	

=== New and extended contracts ===
Date	Position	Nationality	Name	Ref.
16 April 2020	FW	(China)	Dongda He	
18 May 2020	GK	(England)	John Ruddy	
14 August 2020	FW	(Republic of Ireland)	Lewis Richards	
16 September 2020	MF	(Republic of Ireland)	Connor Ronan	
25 September 2020	FW	(Brazil)	Léo Bonatini	
1 October 2020	CB	(England)	Conor Coady	
3 October 2020	FW	(Mexico)	Raúl Jiménez	
14 October 2020	FW	(Canada)	Theo Corbeanu	
16 October 2020	DF	(England)	Dion Sanderson	
21 October 2020	DF	(England)	Max Kilman	
3 November 2020	RW	(Portugal)	Pedro Neto	
14 December 2020	DM	(Belgium)	Leander Dendoncker	
17 December 2020	LM	(England)	Ryan Giles	
17 December 2020	GK	(Denmark)	Andreas Søndergaard	
18 January 2021	AM	(Kosovo)	Meritan Shabani	
28 January 2021	MF	(England)	Luke Cundle	
10 February 2021	FB	(Spain)	Jonny	
18 March 2021	CB	(Morocco)	Romain Saïss	
22 April 2021	AM	(Wales)	Chem Campbell	
23 April 2021	FW	(Republic of Ireland)	Conor Carty	
5 May 2021	GK	(England)	Jackson Smith	
7 May 2021	MF	(Wales)	Owen Hesketh	

=== Transfers out ===
Date	Position	Nationality	Name	To	Fee	Team	Ref.
1 July 2020	RB	(Netherlands)	Jed Abbey	(England) AFC Telford United	Released	Academy	
1 July 2020	LW	(England)	Jordan Graham	(England) Gillingham	Released	First team	
1 July 2020	CB	(England)	Connor Johnson	(England) Kettering Town	Released	Under-23s	
1 July 2020	LW	(Pakistan)	Usman Khan	(England) Kidderminster Harriers	Released	Academy	
1 July 2020	CM	(England)	Kai Lissimore	(England) Kidderminster Harriers	Released	Academy	
1 July 2020	CM	(Switzerland)	Ming-yang Yang	(Switzerland) Grasshopper	Released	First team	
1 July 2020	RB	(Ghana)	Phil Ofosu-Ayeh	(Sweden) Halmstad	Released	First team	
1 July 2020	CM	(England)	Todd Parker	(England) Hednesford Town	Released	Academy	
1 July 2020	RW	(Republic of Ireland)	Callum Thompson	(Republic of Ireland) Bohemian	Released	Under-23s	
7 July 2020	RW	(Portugal)	Hélder Costa	(England) Leeds United	£16,000,000	First team	
16 July 2020	AM	(Hong Kong)	Tsun Dai	(China) Shenzhen	Undisclosed	Under-23s	
27 July 2020	CM	(Scotland)	Elliot Watt	(England) Bradford City	Undisclosed	Under-23s	
7 August 2020	FW	(Portugal)	Boubacar Hanne	(Portugal) Gil Vicente	Undisclosed	Under-23s	
14 August 2020	GK	(England)	Will Norris	(England) Burnley	Undisclosed	First team	
28 August 2020	FW	(England)	Cameron John	(England) Doncaster Rovers	Undisclosed	Under-23s	
30 August 2020	RB	(Republic of Ireland)	Matt Doherty	(England) Tottenham Hotspur	Undisclosed	First team	
7 September 2020	CF	(England)	Benny Ashley-Seal	(England) Northampton Town	Undisclosed	Under-23s	
12 September 2020	CB	(Hungary)	Dániel Csóka	(England) AFC Wimbledon	Undisclosed	Under-23s	
19 September 2020	LW	(Portugal)	Diogo Jota	(England) Liverpool	£45,000,000	First team	
5 October 2020	CB	(England)	Ed Francis	(England) Harrogate Town	Contract terminated	Under-23s	
16 October 2020	CB	(England)	Ryan Bennett	(Wales) Swansea City	Free transfer	First team	
18 January 2021	CF	(England)	Niall Ennis	(England) Plymouth Argyle	Undisclosed	Under-23s	
25 January 2021	DF	(Norway)	John Kitolano	(Norway) Odd	Undisclosed	Under-23s	
1 February 2021	DM	(Wales)	Terry Taylor	(England) Burton Albion	Undisclosed	Under-23s	
1 February 2021	CB	(Portugal)	Roderick Miranda	(Turkey) Gaziantep	Contract terminated	First team	
27 February 2021	RW	(China)	David Wang	(China) Nantong Zhiyun	Undisclosed	Under-23s	

=== Loans out ===
Date from	Position	Nationality	Name	To	Date until	Team	Ref.
21 July 2020	LM	(England)	Ryan Giles	(England) Coventry City	25 January 2021 (Note: This was originally to be a season-long loan but Giles was recalled during the January transfer window.)	Under-23s	
23 August 2020	CF	(Azerbaijan)	Renat Dadashov	(Switzerland) Grasshopper	8 October 2020 (Note: This was originally to be a season-long loan but Dadashov returned after suffering a season-long injury before the beginning of the season.)	Under-23s	
23 August 2020	CM	(Republic of Ireland)	Connor Ronan	(Switzerland) Grasshopper	End of season	First team	
25 August 2020	CM	(Slovakia)	Christián Herc	(Czech Republic) Karviná	End of season	Under-23s	
25 August 2020	CM	(England)	Morgan Gibbs-White	(Wales) Swansea City	6 January 2021 (Note: This was originally to be a season-long loan but Gibbs-White was recalled during the January transfer window.)	First team	
2 September 2020	GK	(Montenegro)	Matija Sarkic	(England) Shrewsbury Town	End of season	First team	
3 September 2020	LB	(Portugal)	Toti	(Switzerland) Grasshopper	End of season	Under-23s	
8 September 2020	DM	(Wales)	Terry Taylor	(England) Grimsby Town	6 January 2021 (Note: This was originally to be a season-long loan but Taylor was recalled during the January transfer window.)	Under-23s	
8 September 2020	CM	(Portugal)	Bruno Jordão	(Portugal) Famalicão	End of season	First team	
17 September 2020	GK	(England)	Jamie Pardington	(England) Dulwich Hamlet	1 January 2021	Under-23s	
19 September 2020	FW	(Ecuador)	Leonardo Campana	(Portugal) Famalicão	End of season	First team	
22 September 2020	CF	(Brazil)	Léo Bonatini	(Switzerland) Grasshopper	30 June 2022	First team	
5 October 2020	LB	(Portugal)	Rúben Vinagre	(Greece) Olympiacos	4 January 2021 (Note: This was originally to be a season-long loan but Vinagre was recalled during the January transfer window.)	First team	
5 October 2020	DF	(Norway)	John Kitolano	(Norway) Odd	1 January 2021	Under-23s	
7 October 2020	GK	(England)	Jackson Smith	(England) Frickley Athletic	1 January 2021	Under-23s	
10 October 2020	CF	(England)	Austin Samuels	(England) Bradford City	13 January 2021 (Note: This was originally to be a season-long loan but Samuels was recalled during the January transfer window.)	Under-23s	
16 October 2020	CF	(England)	Niall Ennis	(England) Burton Albion	5 January 2021 (Note: This was originally to be a season-long loan but Ennis was recalled during the January transfer window.)	Under-23s	
16 October 2020	CB	(England)	Dion Sanderson	(England) Sunderland	End of season	Under-23s	
5 January 2021	LB	(Portugal)	Rúben Vinagre	(Portugal) Famalicão	End of season	First team	
11 January 2021	RB	(Denmark)	Oskar Buur	(Switzerland) Grasshopper	30 June 2022	First team	
26 January 2021	LM	(England)	Ryan Giles	(England) Rotherham United	End of season	Under-23s	
31 January 2021	CF	(Italy)	Patrick Cutrone	(Spain) Valencia	End of season	First team	
1 February 2021	GK	(England)	Jamie Pardington	(England) Mansfield Town	End of season	Under-23s	
1 February 2021	AM	(Kosovo)	Meritan Shabani	(Netherlands) VVV-Venlo	End of season	Under-23s	
1 February 2021	FB	(England)	Luke Matheson	(England) Ipswich Town	End of season	Under-23s	
26 February 2021	FW	(China)	Dongda He	(China) Beijing Sinobo Guoan	31 December 2021	Under-23s	
