= 2022–23 Wolverhampton Wanderers F.C. season =

English football club season

Wolverhampton Wanderers F.C.
2022–23 season
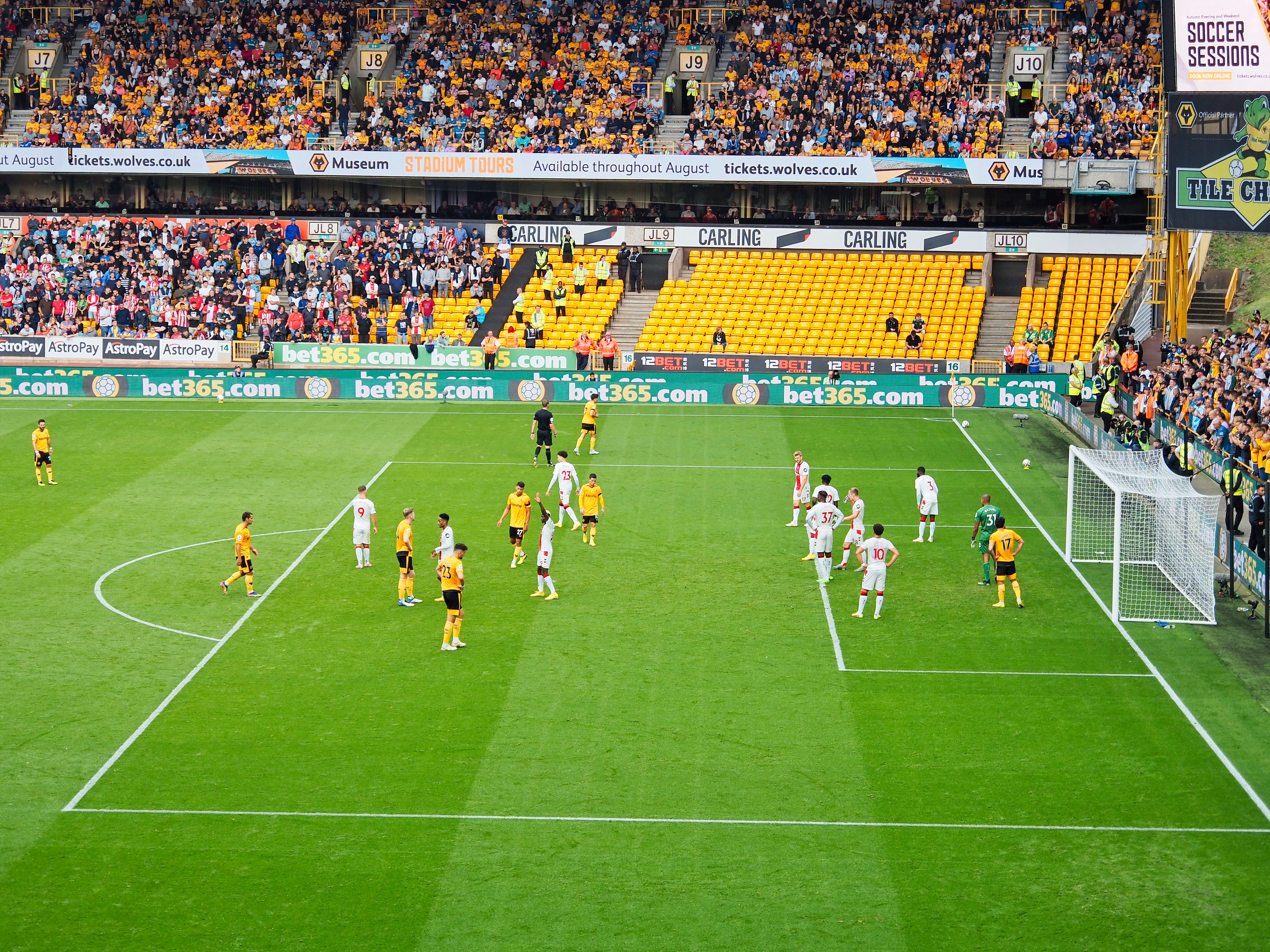
- Wolves players lining up for a corner kick against Southampton on 3 September
- Chairman: Jeff Shi
- Head coach: Bruno Lage (until 2 October); Steve Davis (caretaker, from 2 October to 14 November); Julen Lopetegui (from 14 November)
- Stadium: Molineux
- Premier League: 13th
- FA Cup: Third round
- EFL Cup: Quarter-finals
- Top goalscorer: League: Rúben Neves; Daniel Podence (6 each); All: Rúben Neves; Daniel Podence (6 each)
- Highest home attendance: 31,664 vs Liverpool (4 February 2023, Premier League)
- Lowest home attendance: 21,946 vs Preston North End (23 August 2022, EFL Cup)
- Average home league attendance: 31,153
Home colours	Away colours	Third colours

The 2022–23 season was the 145th in the existence of Wolverhampton Wanderers Football Club and the club's fifth consecutive in the Premier League. In addition to the league, they also competed in the FA Cup and the EFL Cup.

== Transfers ==
=== In ===
Date	Pos.	Player	Transferred from	Fee	Team	Ref.
1 July 2022	CF	(South Korea) Hwang Hee-chan	(Germany) RB Leipzig	Undisclosed	First team	
2 July 2022	CF	(England) Leon Chiwome	(England) AFC Wimbledon	Undisclosed	Under-18's	
2 July 2022	RW	(England) Dom Plank	(England) Dorking Wanderers	Free transfer	Under-18's	
12 July 2022	CB	(Republic of Ireland) Nathan Collins	(England) Burnley	Undisclosed	First team	
8 August 2022	LW	(Portugal) Gonçalo Guedes	(Spain) Valencia	Undisclosed	First team	
11 August 2022	LB	(England) Testimony Igbinoghene	(England) Manchester City	Free transfer	Under-18's	
17 August 2022	MF	(Portugal) Matheus Nunes	(Portugal) Sporting CP	Undisclosed	First team	
31 August 2022	CF	(Austria) Saša Kalajdžić	(Germany) VfB Stuttgart	Undisclosed (Note: Fee reported as £15,000,000)	First team	
2 September 2022	CB	(England) Alfie Pond	(England) Exeter City	Undisclosed	Under-21's	
12 September 2022	CF	(Spain) Diego Costa	Unattached	Free transfer	First team	
27 September 2022	AM	(England) Thomas Edozie	(England) XYZ Academy	Free transfer	Youth	
3 January 2023	CB	(England) Max Ruddock	(England) Bradford City	Free transfer	Youth	
13 January 2023	DM	(Gabon) Mario Lemina	(France) Nice	£9,700,000	First team	
17 January 2023	MF	(Spain) Pablo Sarabia	(France) Paris Saint-Germain	Undisclosed	First team	
22 January 2023	CB	(England) Craig Dawson	(England) West Ham United	Undisclosed	First team	
25 January 2023	GK	(England) Dan Bentley	(England) Bristol City	Undisclosed	First team	
30 January 2023	CM	(Brazil) João Gomes	(Brazil) Flamengo	Undisclosed	First team	
23 March 2023	GK	(England) George Hardy	(England) Rotherham United	Undisclosed	Youth	

=== Out ===
Date	Pos.	Player	Transferred to	Fee	Ref.
30 June 2022	CF	(Republic of Ireland) Conor Carty	(England) Bolton Wanderers	Released	
30 June 2022	CB	(Austria) Pascal Estrada	(Slovenia) Olimpija Ljubljana	Released	
30 June 2022	LB	(Brazil) Marçal	(Brazil) Botafogo	Released	
30 June 2022	CB	(France) Raphaël Nya	(France) Paris	Released	
30 June 2022	GK	(England) Jamie Pardington	(England) Grimsby Town	Released	
30 June 2022	GK	(England) John Ruddy	(England) Birmingham City	Released	
30 June 2022	CB	(Morocco) Romain Saïss	(Turkey) Beşiktaş	Released	
30 June 2022	CF	(Liberia) Faisu Sangare	(England) FC United of Manchester	Released	
1 July 2022	CM	(England) Oliver Sweeney	(England) Burnley	Free transfer	
1 July 2022	LB	(Portugal) Rúben Vinagre	(Portugal) Sporting CP	£9,000,000	
9 July 2022	CF	(Azerbaijan) Renat Dadashov	(Switzerland) Grasshopper	Undisclosed	
9 July 2022	AM	(Germany) Meritan Shabani	(Switzerland) Grasshopper	Undisclosed	
15 July 2022	GK	(Wales) Luke Armstrong	(Wales) Cardiff City	Free transfer	
19 August 2022	AM	(England) Morgan Gibbs-White	(England) Nottingham Forest	Undisclosed (Note: Fee reported as £25,000,000 with £17,000,000 of potential add-ons)	
29 August 2022	CF	(Italy) Patrick Cutrone	(Italy) Como 1907	Undisclosed	
1 September 2022	CB	(Ivory Coast) Willy Boly	(England) Nottingham Forest	Undisclosed	
1 September 2022	DM	(Belgium) Leander Dendoncker	(England) Aston Villa	£13,000,000	
2 December 2022	CF	(Brazil) Léo Bonatini	(Mexico) Atlético San Luis	Contract terminated	
20 January 2023	CF	(Ecuador) Leonardo Campana	(United States) Inter Miami	Undisclosed	
23 January 2023	MF	(Republic of Ireland) Connor Ronan	(United States) Colorado Rapids	Undisclosed	
29 January 2023	GK	(Republic of Ireland) Joe O'Shaughnessy	(England) Macclesfield	Contract terminated	
31 January 2023	GK	(Denmark) Andreas Søndergaard	(Wales) Swansea City	Contract terminated	
22 March 2023	FW	(South Korea) Jeong Sang-bin	(United States) Minnesota United	Undisclosed	
7 April 2023	FW	(China) Dongda He	(China) Changchun Yatai	Undisclosed	

=== Loans in ===
Date	Pos.	Player	Loaned from	On loan until	Ref.
1 September 2022	MF	(Mali) Boubacar Traoré	(France) Metz	End of Season	
1 January 2023	FW	(Brazil) Matheus Cunha	(Spain) Atlético Madrid	End of Season	

=== Loans out ===
Date	Pos.	Player	Loaned to	On loan until	Ref.
23 June 2022	RB	(Netherlands) Ki-Jana Hoever	(Netherlands) PSV Eindhoven	25 January 2023 (Note: On 23 January, Hoever was recalled from his season-long loan at PSV Eindhoven and was subsequently loaned to Stoke.)	
23 June 2022	MF	(England) Ryan Giles	(England) Middlesbrough	End of Season	
27 June 2022	RB	(Hungary) Bendegúz Bolla	(Switzerland) Grasshopper	End of Season	
1 July 2022	GK	(England) Louie Moulden	(England) Solihull Moors	1 January 2023	
5 July 2022	CB	(England) Dion Sanderson	(England) Birmingham City	End of Season	
8 July 2022	CB	(Republic of Ireland) Lewis Richards	(England) Harrogate Town	3 January 2023 (Note: On 3 January, Richards was recalled from his season-long loan at Harrogate after sustaining a season-ending injury.)	
14 July 2022	CB	(England) Taylor Perry	(England) Cheltenham Town	End of Season	
19 July 2022	CF	(Portugal) Fábio Silva	(Belgium) Anderlecht	25 January 2023 (Note: On 23 January, Silva was recalled from his season-long loan at Anderlecht and was subsequently loaned to PSV Eindhoven.)	
28 July 2022	CF	(Canada) Theo Corbeanu	(England) Blackpool	3 January 2023 (Note: On 3 January, Corbanu was recalled from his season-long loan at Blackpool after sustaining an injury. He was subsequently loaned to Arminia Bielefeld.)	
29 July 2022	CB	(Netherlands) Nigel Lonwijk	(England) Plymouth Argyle	End of Season	
8 August 2022	CB	(England) Conor Coady	(England) Everton	End of Season	
19 August 2022	GK	(Republic of Ireland) Joe O'Shaughnessy	(England) Bradford City	29 January 2023 (Note: On 23 January, O'Shaughnessy was recalled from his season-long loan at Bradford and his contract with Wolves was terminated.)	
23 August 2022	CM	(Portugal) Bruno Jordão	(Portugal) Santa Clara	End of Season	
26 August 2022	GK	(England) Joe Young	(England) Dartford	1 January 2023	
29 August 2022	CM	(England) Luke Cundle	(Wales) Swansea City	End of Season	
31 August 2022	GK	(Iceland) Pálmi Arinbjörnsson	(Norway) Skeid	1 January 2023	
1 September 2022	CB	(Portugal) Christian Marques	(England) Forest Green Rovers	12 December 2022 (Note: On 12 December, Marques was recalled from his season-long loan at Forest Green after sustaining a long-term injury.)	
6 January 2023	GK	(England) Joe Young	(England) Telford United	End of Season	
20 January 2023	LW	(Portugal) Gonçalo Guedes	(Portugal) Benfica	End of Season	
20 January 2023	CF	(Canada) Theo Corbeanu	(Germany) Arminia Bielefeld	End of Season	
25 January 2023	CF	(Portugal) Fábio Silva	(Netherlands) PSV Eindhoven	End of Season	
25 January 2023	GK	(Montenegro) Matija Sarkic	(England) Stoke City	End of Season	
27 January 2023	RB	(Netherlands) Ki-Jana Hoever	(England) Stoke City	End of Season	
27 January 2023	GK	(England) Jackson Smith	(England) Walsall	End of Season	
30 January 2023	AM	(Wales) Chem Campbell	(England) Wycombe Wanderers	End of Season	
2 February 2023	CB	(Colombia) Yerson Mosquera	(United States) FC Cincinnati	End of Season	

=== New and extended contracts ===
Date	Pos.	Player	Ref.
10 June 2022	CB	(England) Michael Agboola	
10 June 2022	GK	(England) Jackson Smith	
10 June 2022	GK	(England) Joe Young	
4 July 2022	MF	(Portugal) João Moutinho	
11 July 2022	GK	(Montenegro) Matija Sarkic	
12 July 2022	RB	(England) Marvin Kaleta	
19 July 2022	CF	(Portugal) Fábio Silva	
28 July 2022	CF	(Canada) Theo Corbeanu	
29 July 2022	CB	(Netherlands) Nigel Lonwijk	
11 August 2022	LW	(England) Ty Barnett	
31 August 2022	GK	(Iceland) Palmi Arinbjornsson	
13 October 2022	CF	(Wales) Chem Campbell	
27 October 2022	GK	(Republic of Ireland) James Storer	
2 November 2022	LB	(Spain) Hugo Bueno	
8 December 2022	CF	(England) Owen Farmer	
9 January 2023	LB	(Jamaica) Dexter Lembikisa	
21 January 2023	DM	(Republic of Ireland) Joe Hodge	
23 January 2023	RW	(England) Ethan McLeod	
1 February 2023	CB	(Netherlands) Justin Hubner	
2 February 2023	DM	(Italy) Temple Ojinnaka	
6 February 2023	GK	(England) Louie Moulden	
10 February 2023	CF	(England) Leon Chiwome	
2 March 2023	CB	(England) Ollie Tipton	
27 March 2023	CM	(Wales) Owen Hesketh	
13 April 2023	CB	(England) Filozofe Mabete	
19 April 2023	RW	(Wales) Josh Esen	
24 April 2023	RW	(Jamaica) Tyler Roberts	

== Pre-season and friendlies ==
=== Summer friendlies ===
On 15 June, Wolves announced a pre-season training camp in Alicante, which includes two friendlies against Beşiktaş and Alavés. A double header in Algarve, against Sporting CP and Farense was later added. A behind-closed-doors match against Villarreal B was scheduled to conclude to team's trip to Alicante.

Win Draw Loss Fixtures

2 July 2022 Friendly	Wolverhampton Wanderers	4–1	Forest Green Rovers	Wolverhampton, England
12:00 BST	Neto; Campbell; A. Traoré; Jordão			Stadium: Sir Jack Hayward Training Ground; Attendance: 0 (behind-closed-doors)

9 July 2022 Friendly	Wolverhampton Wanderers	3–0	Burnley	Wolverhampton, England
12:30 BST	Gibbs-White; Podence; Chiquinho			Stadium: Sir Jack Hayward Training Ground; Attendance: 0 (behind-closed-doors)

20 July 2022 Friendly	Alavés	0–4	Wolverhampton Wanderers	La Nucia, Spain
19:00 CEST		Report	Jiménez 22' (pen.); Neto 43'; Podence 51'; Kilman 89'	Stadium: Estadi Olímpic Camilo Cano

21 July 2022 Friendly	Levante	2–1	Wolverhampton Wanderers	Benidorm, Spain
10:30 CEST	Roger 32', (red card) 44'; Bardhi (red card) 35'; Leal (yellow card) 53'; Kochorashvili 59'	Report	Mosquera (red card) 35'; Podence (red card) 44'; Toti 82'	Stadium: Melia Villaitana Football Center; Attendance: 0 (behind-closed-doors); Referee: Jorge Tarraga Lajara

23 July 2022 Friendly	Beşiktaş	0–3	Wolverhampton Wanderers	La Nucia, Spain
19:00 CEST	Weghorst (yellow card) 45+2'; Welinton (yellow card) 61'	Report	Jiménez 15'; Podence 29'; Neto 40'; Moutinho (yellow card) 45+2'; Neves (yellow card) 56'; Coady (yellow card) 85'	Stadium: Estadi Olímpic Camilo Cano

24 July 2022 Friendly	Villarreal B	2–1	Wolverhampton Wanderers	Benidorm, Spain
11:00 CEST	Ontiveros 49'; Iosifov 68'	Report	Mosquera 24'	Stadium: Melia Villaitana Football Center; Attendance: 0 (behind-closed-doors)

30 July 2022 Friendly	Sporting CP	1–1	Wolverhampton Wanderers	São João da Venda, Portugal
18:45 WEST	Gonçalves 44' (pen.); Porro (yellow card) 48'; Paulinho (yellow card) 49'; Morita (yellow card) 50'	Report	Neves 15' (pen.); Aït-Nouri (yellow card) 48'; Podence (yellow card) 50'; Neto (yellow card) 62'; Moutinho (yellow card) 76'; Campbell (yellow card) 90+3'	Stadium: Estádio Algarve; Referee: Bruno Vieira

31 July 2022 Friendly	Farense	1–1	Wolverhampton Wanderers	Faro, Portugal
18:45 WEST	Ponde 5'	Report	Coady (yellow card) 3'; Hwang 56' (pen.)	Stadium: Estádio de São Luís

=== Winter friendlies ===
Due to the 2022 FIFA World Cup taking place during the winter, the Premier League and any cup competition fixtures were put on hold. During this period of time, Wolves would play a selection of friendly matches, the first being against Birmingham City on 3 December 2022, which would then be followed by a ten-day trip to Marbella, where they faced Empoli on 9 December and Cádiz on 14 December.

Win Draw Loss Fixtures

3 December 2022 Friendly	Wolverhampton Wanderers	2–2	Birmingham City	Wolverhampton, England
13:00 BST	Costa; Podence		Jutkiewicz	Stadium: Sir Jack Hayward Training Ground; Attendance: 0 (behind-closed-doors)

9 December 2022 Friendly	Empoli	1–1	Wolverhampton Wanderers
12:30 GMT	Lammers 70'		Bueno 27'

14 December 2022 Friendly	Cádiz	3–4	Wolverhampton Wanderers
11:00 GMT	Toti 10' (o.g.); Alcaraz 57'; Fernández 90'		García 2' (o.g.); Collins 32'; Podence 38'; Fornés 76' (o.g.)

== Competitions ==
=== Overall record ===
Competition	First match	Last match	Starting round	Final position	Record							
Competition	First match	Last match	Starting round	Final position	Pld	W	D	L	GF	GA	GD	Win %
Premier League	6 August 2022	28 May 2023	Matchday 1	13th	38	11	8	19	31	58	−27	28.95
FA Cup	7 January 2023	17 January 2023	Third round	Third round	2	0	1	1	2	3	−1	0.00
EFL Cup	23 August 2022	11 January 2023	Second round	Quarter-finals	4	3	1	0	6	2	+4	75.00
Total					44	14	10	20	39	63	−24	31.82

Source: Soccerway

=== Premier League ===
==== League table ====
Pos	Team	Pld	W	D	L	GF	GA	GD	Pts	Qualification or relegation
11	Crystal Palace	38	11	12	15	40	49	−9	45	
12	Chelsea	38	11	11	16	38	47	−9	44	
13	Wolverhampton Wanderers	38	11	8	19	31	58	−27	41	
14	West Ham United	38	11	7	20	42	55	−13	40	Qualification to Europa League group stage (Note: West Ham United qualified for the Europa League group stage by winning the 2022–23 UEFA Europa Conference League.)
15	Bournemouth	38	11	6	21	37	71	−34	39	

Source: Premier League
Rules for classification: 1) Points; 2) Goal difference; 3) Goals scored; 4) If the champions, relegated teams or qualified teams for UEFA competitions cannot be determined by rules 1 to 3, rules 4.1 to 4.3 are applied – 4.1) Points gained in head-to-head record between such teams; 4.2) Away goals scored in head-to-head record between such teams; 4.3) Play-offs

==== Results summary ====
Overall								Home						Away					
Pld	W	D	L	GF	GA	GD	Pts	W	D	L	GF	GA	GD	W	D	L	GF	GA	GD
38	11	8	19	31	58	−27	41	9	3	7	19	20	−1	2	5	12	12	38	−26

Source: Premier League

==== Results by round ====
Round	1	2	3	4	5	6	7	8	9	10	11	12	13	14	15	16	17	18	19	20	21	22	23	24	25	26	27	28	29	30	31	32	33	34	35	36	37	38
Ground	A	H	A	H	A	H	A	H	A	A	H	A	H	A	H	H	A	H	A	H	A	H	A	H	A	H	A	H	A	H	H	A	H	A	H	A	H	A
Result	L	D	L	D	D	W	L	L	L	L	W	L	L	D	L	L	W	L	D	W	L	W	W	L	D	W	L	L	D	W	W	L	W	L	W	L	D	L
Position	14	14	18	19	18	14	14	16	18	18	17	18	19	19	19	20	18	19	19	16	17	15	15	15	15	13	13	13	14	13	13	14	13	14	13	13	13	13

Source: Premier League
A = Away; H = Home; W = Win; D = Draw; L = Loss; P = Postponed

==== Matches ====
Win Draw Loss Fixtures

On 16 June, the Premier League fixtures were released.

6 August 2022 1	Leeds United	2–1	Wolverhampton Wanderers	Leeds
15:00 BST	Harrison (yellow card) 20'; Rodrigo 24'; Aït-Nouri 74' (o.g.); Adams (yellow card) 90+3'	Report	Podence 6'	Stadium: Elland Road; Attendance: 36,347 (2,903 away fans); Referee: Robert Jones

13 August 2022 2	Wolverhampton Wanderers	0–0	Fulham	Wolverhampton
15:00 BST	Podence (yellow card) 17'; Neves (yellow card) 36'; Gibbs-White (yellow card) 90+5'	Report	Palhinha (yellow card) 44'; Reed (yellow card) 50'; Mitrović (penalty missed) 81', (yellow card) 90+5'	Stadium: Molineux Stadium; Attendance: 31,178 (1,482 away fans); Referee: John Brooks

20 August 2022 3	Tottenham Hotspur	1–0	Wolverhampton Wanderers	Tottenham, London
12:30 BST	Højbjerg (yellow card) 12'; Kane 64', (yellow card) 67'	Report	Aït-Nouri (yellow card) 56'; Collins (yellow card) 67'	Stadium: Tottenham Hotspur Stadium; Attendance: 61,298 (3,038 away fans); Referee: Simon Hooper

28 August 2022 4	Wolverhampton Wanderers	1–1	Newcastle United	Wolverhampton
14:00 BST	Semedo (yellow card) 28'; Neves 38'; Neto (yellow card) 58'	Report	Schär (yellow card) 46'; Saint-Maximin 90'	Stadium: Molineux Stadium; Attendance: 31,311 (2,956 away fans); Referee: Peter Bankes

31 August 2022 5	Bournemouth	0–0	Wolverhampton Wanderers	Bournemouth
19:30 BST	Neto (yellow card) 67'; Mepham (yellow card) 90'	Report	Neves (yellow card) 90'	Stadium: Vitality Stadium; Attendance: 10,113 (1,318 away fans); Referee: Anthony Taylor

3 September 2022 6	Wolverhampton Wanderers	1–0	Southampton	Wolverhampton
15:00 BST	Jonny (yellow card) 27'; Podence 45+1'; Moutinho (yellow card) 76'; Neves (yellow card) 81'; Guedes (yellow card) 90+4'	Report	Diallo (yellow card) 45'; Bella-Kotchap (yellow card) 90+5'	Stadium: Molineux Stadium; Attendance: 30,546 (2,283 away fans); Referee: John Brooks

17 September 2022 8	Wolverhampton Wanderers	0–3	Manchester City	Wolverhampton
12:30 BST	Collins (red card) 33'; Nunes (yellow card) 65'; Neves (yellow card) 66'	Report	Grealish 1'; Rodri (yellow card) 13'; Haaland 16'; Foden 69'	Stadium: Molineux Stadium; Attendance: 31,578 (2,968 away fans); Referee: Anthony Taylor

1 October 2022 9	West Ham United	2–0	Wolverhampton Wanderers	Stratford
17:30 BST	Scamacca 29'; Rice (yellow card) 52'; Bowen 54'; Cresswell (yellow card) 83'	Report	Neves (yellow card) 14'; Moutinho (yellow card) 22'	Stadium: London Stadium; Attendance: 62,437 (3,001 away fans); Referee: Paul Tierney

8 October 2022 10	Chelsea	3–0	Wolverhampton Wanderers	Fulham, London
15:00 BST	Azpilicueta (yellow card) 22'; Havertz 45+3'; Pulisic 54'; Jorginho (yellow card) 61'; Broja 89'	Report		Stadium: Stamford Bridge; Attendance: 39,940 (2,986 away fans); Referee: Simon Hooper

15 October 2022 11	Wolverhampton Wanderers	1–0	Nottingham Forest	Wolverhampton
15:00 BST	Neves 56' (pen.); Podence (yellow card) 80'	Report	Dennis (yellow card) 16'; McKenna (yellow card) 67'; Johnson (penalty missed) 79'	Stadium: Molineux Stadium; Attendance: 31,554 (2,970 away fans); Referee: Thomas Bramall

18 October 2022 12	Crystal Palace	2–1	Wolverhampton Wanderers	Selhurst
20:15 BST	Ward (yellow card) 39'; Doucouré (yellow card) 45+4'; Eze 47'; Zaha 70'; Guéhi (yellow card) 90+1'	Report	A. Traoré 31'; B. Traoré (yellow card) 39'	Stadium: Selhurst Park; Attendance: 25,125 (2,608 away fans); Referee: David Coote

23 October 2022 13	Wolverhampton Wanderers	0–4	Leicester City	Wolverhampton
14:00 BST	Jonny (yellow card) 7'; Semedo (yellow card) 85'	Report	Tielemans 8'; Barnes 19'; Maddison 65'; Vardy 79'; Faes (yellow card) 90+3'	Stadium: Molineux Stadium; Attendance: 31,483 (2,968 away fans); Referee: Michael Oliver

29 October 2022 14	Brentford	1–1	Wolverhampton Wanderers	Brentford, London
15:00 BST	Mee 50'; Mbeumo (yellow card) 80'; Damsgaard (yellow card) 86'; Toney (yellow card) 90+3'	Report	Semedo (yellow card) 1'; Podence (yellow card) 30'; Neves 52', (yellow card) 84'; Costa (red card) 90+7'	Stadium: Brentford Community Stadium; Attendance: 17,051 (1,725 away fans); Referee: Bobby Madley

5 November 2022 15	Wolverhampton Wanderers	2–3	Brighton & Hove Albion	Wolverhampton
15:00 GMT	Guedes 12'; Neves 35' (pen.); Semedo (red card) 45+5'; Jonny (yellow card) 62'; Collins (yellow card) 65'	Report	Lallana 10'; Mitoma 44'; Groß 83'	Stadium: Molineux Stadium; Attendance: 30,732 (2,964 away fans); Referee: Graham Scott

12 November 2022 16	Wolverhampton Wanderers	0–2	Arsenal	Wolverhampton
19:45 GMT	Toti (yellow card) 37'; B. Traoré (yellow card) 45+1'; Bueno (yellow card) 90+2'	Report	Partey (yellow card) 52'; Ødegaard 55', 75'; Gabriel (yellow card) 60'	Stadium: Molineux Stadium; Attendance: 31,624 (2,970 away fans); Referee: Stuart Attwell

26 December 2022 17	Everton	1–2	Wolverhampton Wanderers	Liverpool
15:00 GMT	Mina 7'; Patterson (yellow card) 38'	Report	Podence 22', (yellow card) 61'; Kilman (yellow card) 64'; Neves (yellow card) 79'; Toti (yellow card) 81'; Costa (yellow card) 90'; Aït-Nouri 90+5', (yellow card) 90+6'	Stadium: Goodison Park; Attendance: 39,252 (2,972 away fans); Referee: Craig Pawson

31 December 2022 18	Wolverhampton Wanderers	0–1	Manchester United	Wolverhampton
12:30 GMT	Semedo (yellow card) 26'	Report	Casemiro (yellow card) 57'; Fred (yellow card) 72'; Rashford 76', (yellow card) 88'	Stadium: Molineux Stadium; Attendance: 31,658 (2,969 away fans); Referee: Robert Jones

4 January 2023 19	Aston Villa	1–1	Wolverhampton Wanderers	Birmingham
20:00 GMT	Ings 78'; Coutinho (yellow card) 82'	Report	Podence 12'; Hwang (yellow card) 36'; Kilman (yellow card) 45+1'; Costa (yellow card) 52'	Stadium: Villa Park; Attendance: 39,978 (2,999 away fans); Referee: Jarred Gillett

14 January 2023 20	Wolverhampton Wanderers	1–0	West Ham United	Wolverhampton
15:00 GMT	Podence 48'	Report	Aguerd (yellow card) 70'; Rice (yellow card) 90+3'	Stadium: Molineux Stadium; Attendance: 31,511 (2,969 away fans); Referee: Simon Hooper

22 January 2023 21	Manchester City	3–0	Wolverhampton Wanderers	Manchester
14:00 GMT	Rodri (yellow card) 25'; Haaland 40', 50' (pen.), 54'	Report	Kilman (yellow card) 10'; Lemina (yellow card) 13'	Stadium: City of Manchester Stadium; Attendance: 53,282 (3,000 away fans); Referee: David Coote

4 February 2023 22	Wolverhampton Wanderers	3–0	Liverpool	Wolverhampton
15:00 GMT	Matip 5' (o.g.); Dawson 12', (yellow card) 45+4'; Neves 71'	Report	Gomez (yellow card) 75'	Stadium: Molineux Stadium; Attendance: 31,664 (2,965 away fans); Referee: Paul Tierney

11 February 2023 23	Southampton	1–2	Wolverhampton Wanderers	Southampton
15:00 GMT	Alcaraz 24'; Ward-Prowse (yellow card) 35'; Maitland-Niles (yellow card) 37'	Report	Lemina (yellow card) 9' (yellow-red card) 27'; Semedo (yellow card) 23'; Aït-Nouri (yellow card) 30'; Bednarek 72' (o.g.); João Gomes 87'	Stadium: St Mary's Stadium; Attendance: 29,751 (3,196 away fans); Referee: Jarred Gillett

18 February 2023 24	Wolverhampton Wanderers	0–1	Bournemouth	Wolverhampton
15:00 GMT	Aït-Nouri (yellow card) 72'; João Gomes (yellow card) 74'; Sarabia (yellow card) 86'	Report	Billing (yellow card) 29'; Tavernier 49'; Smith (yellow card) 70'; Senesi (yellow card) 74'	Stadium: Molineux Stadium; Attendance: 31,222 (1,803 away fans); Referee: Michael Salisbury

24 February 2023 25	Fulham	1–1	Wolverhampton Wanderers	Fulham, London
20:00 GMT	Palhinha (yellow card) 18'; Solomon 64'; Pereira (yellow card) 73'	Report	Sarabia 23'	Stadium: Craven Cottage; Attendance: 24,399 (2,299 away fans); Referee: Michael Oliver

1 March 2023 7	Liverpool	2–0	Wolverhampton Wanderers	Liverpool
20:00 GMT	Bajcetic (yellow card) 15'; Fabinho (yellow card) 53'; Van Dijk 73'; Salah 77'	Report	Semedo (yellow card) 36'; Sarabia (yellow card) 45+4'; Neves (yellow card) 68'	Stadium: Anfield; Attendance: 53,259 (2,936 away fans); Referee: Paul Tierney
Note: The match, originally to be played on 10 September 2022, was included in the league-wide postponement due to the death of Queen Elizabeth II. The rescheduled date was announced on 7 February 2023.

4 March 2023 26	Wolverhampton Wanderers	1–0	Tottenham Hotspur	Wolverhampton
15:00 GMT	Neves (yellow card) 45+4'; A. Traoré 82'	Report	Kulusevski (yellow card) 61'	Stadium: Molineux Stadium; Attendance: 31,585 (2,932 away fans); Referee: Tim Robinson

12 March 2023 27	Newcastle United	2–1	Wolverhampton Wanderers	Newcastle upon Tyne
16:30 GMT	Isak 26', (yellow card) 68'; Almirón 79'	Report	Podence (yellow card) 44'; Semedo (yellow card) 58'; Hwang 70'	Stadium: St James' Park; Attendance: 52,240 (2,738 away fans); Referee: Andrew Madley

18 March 2023 28	Wolverhampton Wanderers	2–4	Leeds United	Wolverhampton
15:00 GMT	Dawson (yellow card) 37'; Semedo (yellow card) 53'; Jonny 65', (red card) 84'; Cunha 73'; João Gomes (yellow card) 87'; Nunes (red card) 90+10'	Report	Harrison 6'; Ayling (yellow card) 24', (goal) 49'; Firpo (yellow card) 45+2'; McKennie (yellow card) 45+3'; Kristensen 62'; Roca (yellow card) 75'; Rodrigo 90+7'; Meslier (yellow card) 90+12'	Stadium: Molineux Stadium; Attendance: 31,570 (2,947 away fans); Referee: Michael Salisbury

1 April 2023 29	Nottingham Forest	1–1	Wolverhampton Wanderers	Nottingham
15:00 BST	Freuler (yellow card) 35'; Johnson 38', (yellow card) 40'; Toffolo (yellow card) 49'	Report	Neves (yellow card) 42'; Moutinho (yellow card) 45'; Semedo (yellow card) 79'; Podence 83'; Sarabia (yellow card) 85'; Toti (yellow card) 90+3'	Stadium: City Ground; Attendance: 29,368 (2,955 away fans); Referee: Chris Kavanagh

8 April 2023 30	Wolverhampton Wanderers	1–0	Chelsea	Wolverhampton
15:00 BST	Nunes 31'; Lemina (yellow card) 39'; João Gomes (yellow card) 59'	Report	Cucurella (yellow card) 49'; Sterling (yellow card) 63'; Gallagher (yellow card) 67'; Kovačić (yellow card) 87'; Chilwell (yellow card) 89'	Stadium: Molineux Stadium; Attendance: 31,614 (2,963 away fans); Referee: Peter Bankes

15 April 2023 31	Wolverhampton Wanderers	2–0	Brentford	Wolverhampton
15:00 BST	Costa 27'; João Gomes (yellow card) 12'; Hwang 69'	Report	Jensen (yellow card) 35'	Stadium: Molineux Stadium; Attendance: 30,769 (2,586 away fans); Referee: Paul Tierney

22 April 2023 32	Leicester City	2–1	Wolverhampton Wanderers	Leicester
15:00 BST	Iheanacho 37' (pen.); Soumaré (yellow card) 60'; Castagne 75'	Report	Cunha 13', (yellow card) 65'; Sá (yellow card) 34'; Toti (yellow card) 42'	Stadium: King Power Stadium; Attendance: 32,053 (3,291 away fans); Referee: Andrew Madley

25 April 2023 33	Wolverhampton Wanderers	2–0	Crystal Palace	Wolverhampton
19:30 BST	Andersen 3' (o.g.); Costa (yellow card) 75'; Sá (yellow card) 76'; Toti (yellow card) 84'; João Gomes (yellow card) 90+2'; Neves 90+4' (pen.), (yellow card) 90+5'	Report	Milivojević (yellow card) 13'; Sambi Lokonga (yellow card) 36'; Schlupp (yellow card) 70'; Johnstone (yellow card) 90+2'	Stadium: Molineux Stadium; Attendance: 30,792 (1,617 away fans); Referee: Robert Jones

29 April 2023 34	Brighton & Hove Albion	6–0	Wolverhampton Wanderers	Falmer
15:00 BST	Undav 6', 66'; Groß 13', 26'; Welbeck 39', 48'; Veltman (yellow card) 45+5'	Report	A. Traoré (yellow card) 90+1'	Stadium: Falmer Stadium; Attendance: 31,584 (2,977 away fans); Referee: David Coote

6 May 2023 35	Wolverhampton Wanderers	1–0	Aston Villa	Wolverhampton
15:00 BST	Toti 9', (yellow card) 82'; Costa (yellow card) 39'; Semedo (yellow card) 90+2'	Report	Mings (yellow card) 39'; Watkins (yellow card) 63'; Douglas Luiz (yellow card) 75'	Stadium: Molineux Stadium; Attendance: 31,641 (2,970 away fans); Referee: Stuart Attwell

13 May 2023 36	Manchester United	2–0	Wolverhampton Wanderers	Manchester
15:00 BST	Martial 32'; Casemiro (yellow card) 36'; Garnacho 90+4', (yellow card) 90+6'; Shaw (yellow card) 90+7'	Report	Costa (yellow card) 15'; Dawson (yellow card) 88'	Stadium: Old Trafford; Attendance: 73,570 (3,097 away fans); Referee: John Brooks

20 May 2023 37	Wolverhampton Wanderers	1–1	Everton	Wolverhampton
15:00 BST	A. Traoré (yellow card) 17'; Hwang 34'; Dawson (yellow card) 45+5'; Semedo (yellow card) 51'; Neves (yellow card) 66'; Nunes (yellow card) 90+4'	Report	Garner (yellow card) 90'; Mina 90+9'	Stadium: Molineux Stadium; Attendance: 31,684 (2,968 away fans); Referee: David Coote

28 May 2023 38	Arsenal	5–0	Wolverhampton Wanderers	Holloway, London
16:30 BST	Xhaka 11', 14'; Saka 27'; Gabriel Jesus 58'; Kiwior 78'	Report		Stadium: Emirates Stadium; Attendance: 60,095 (3,003 away fans); Referee: Andre Marriner

=== FA Cup ===
The club entered the FA Cup at the third round stage and were drawn away to Liverpool.

Win Draw Loss Fixtures

7 January 2023 Third round	Liverpool	2–2	Wolverhampton Wanderers	Liverpool
20:00 GMT	Núñez 45'; Salah 52'	Report	Guedes 26'; Jonny (yellow card) 62'; Hwang 66'	Stadium: Anfield; Attendance: 52,636 (5,693 away fans); Referee: Andrew Madley

17 January 2023 Third round replay	Wolverhampton Wanderers	0–1	Liverpool	Wolverhampton
19:45 GMT	A. Traoré (yellow card) 43'	Report	Elliott 13'; Thiago (yellow card) 57'; Phillips (yellow card) 71'; Gomez (yellow card) 90+2'	Stadium: Molineux Stadium; Attendance: 30,948 (4,817 away fans); Referee: Andre Marriner

=== EFL Cup ===
Wolves entered the competition in the second round and were drawn at home against Preston North End. Wolves were drawn against fellow Premier League side Leeds United in the third round. In the fourth round another home tie was given against Gillingham. An away trip against Nottingham Forest was drawn for the quarter-final stage.

Win Draw Loss Fixtures

23 August 2022 Second round	Wolverhampton Wanderers	2–1	Preston North End	Wolverhampton
19:45 BST	Jiménez 8'; A. Traoré 29'; Hwang (penalty missed) 45+1'; Semedo (yellow card) 72'	Report	Cunningham (yellow card) 21'; Woodburn 48'	Stadium: Molineux Stadium; Attendance: 21,946 (1,406 away fans); Referee: Thomas Bramall

9 November 2022 Third round	Wolverhampton Wanderers	1–0	Leeds United	Wolverhampton
19:45 GMT	B. Traoré 85'	Report		Stadium: Molineux Stadium; Attendance: 24,246 (2,935 away fans); Referee: Andre Marriner

20 December 2022 Fourth round	Wolverhampton Wanderers	2–0	Gillingham	Wolverhampton
19:45 GMT	Jiménez 77' (pen.); Aït-Nouri 90+1'	Report		Stadium: Molineux Stadium; Attendance: 26,943 (1,244 away fans); Referee: Michael Salisbury

11 January 2023 Quarter-finals	Nottingham Forest	1–1 (4–3 p)	Wolverhampton Wanderers	Nottingham
19:45 GMT	Boly 18'; Aurier (yellow card) 88'; Yates (yellow card) 90+4'	Report	Kilman (yellow card) 37'; Jiménez 64'; Neves (yellow card) 74'; Nunes (yellow card) 88'; Podence (yellow card) 88'	Stadium: City Ground; Attendance: 28,656 (2,956 away fans); Referee: Graham Scott
	Penalties
	Surridge (penalty missed); Freuler (penalty scored); Worrall (penalty scored); Gibbs-White (penalty scored); Colback (penalty scored)		(penalty missed) Neves; (penalty scored) Podence; (penalty scored) Nunes; (penalty scored) Cunha; (penalty missed) Hodge

=== EFL Trophy ===
Wolves were one of the sixteen teams from outside the bottom two divisions of the English Football League to be invited to field their academy team in the competition due to it holding Category 1 academy status. They were drawn into Group C in the Northern section.
Note: In group stage matches which are level at the end of 90 minutes, a penalty shoot-out will be held, with the winner earning a bonus point. Wolves were placed in Draw B of the Northern section of the round of 32 draw. They were drawn away to Manchester United U21. Due to the rescheduled 2021 Men's and Women's Rugby League World Cup finals taking place at Old Trafford 3 days prior, it was agreed between the EFL and both clubs that the tie will be played at Molineux.

==== Group table ====
Pos	Div	Team	Pld	W	PW	PL	L	GF	GA	GD	Pts	Qualification
1	L1	Port Vale	3	3	0	0	0	7	0	+7	9	Advance to Round 2
2	ACA	Wolverhampton Wanderers U21	3	2	0	0	1	4	4	0	6	Advance to Round 2
3	L2	Stockport County	3	1	0	0	2	2	3	−1	3	
4	L1	Shrewsbury Town	3	0	0	0	3	1	7	−6	0	

Source: EFL.com

==== Matches ====
Win Draw Loss Fixtures

30 August 2022 Group stage	Shrewsbury Town	1–2	Wolverhampton Wanderers U21	Shrewsbury
19:00 BST	Caton (yellow card) 70'; Etienne (yellow card) 72'; Hearnes 76'		Hubner (yellow card) 66'; Hodge 79' 90+3'; Roberts (yellow card) 83'	Stadium: New Meadow

20 September 2022 Group stage	Stockport County	1–2	Wolverhampton Wanderers U21	Stockport
19:30 BST	Lemonheigh-Evans (yellow card) 43'; Jennings 90+3'		Harkin 20'; Roberts 71'	Stadium: Edgeley Park

18 October 2022 Group stage	Port Vale	2–0	Wolverhampton Wanderers U21	Stoke-on-Trent
19:30 BST	Robinson (yellow card) 68'; Benning 80'; Odubeko 87'		Kandola (yellow card) 61'; Griffiths (yellow card) 77'	Stadium: Vale Park

22 November 2022 Round of 32	Wolverhampton Wanderers U21	0–0 (1–4 p)	Manchester United U21	Wolverhampton
19:00 GMT	Scicluna (yellow card) 41'		Gore (yellow card) 46'	Stadium: Molineux Stadium
	Penalties
	Hodge (penalty scored); Birtwistle (penalty missed); Campbell (penalty missed)		Jurado (penalty scored); McNeill (penalty scored); Norkett (penalty scored); Mainoo (penalty scored)

== Players ==
=== Statistics ===
Key:
‡ On loan from another club * First appearance(s) for the club

- # = Squad number
- Pos = Playing position
- P = Number of games played
- G = Number of goals scored
- GK = Goalkeeper
- DF = Defender
- MF = Midfielder
- FW = Forward
- = Yellow cards
- = Red cards
- † Permanent player left club during the season
- ¤ Loaned to another club for part or all of season

Correct as of 31 May 2023. Starting appearances are listed first, followed by substitute appearances in parentheses where applicable.

No.	Pos	Name	P	G	P	G	P	G	P	G	A yellow card	A red card	Notes
No.	Pos	Name	League		FA Cup		League Cup		Total		Discipline		Notes
1	GK	(Portugal) José Sá	36	0	1	0	2	0	39	0	2	0	
2	DF	(Netherlands) Ki-Jana Hoever ¤	0	0	0	0	0	0	0	0	0	0	
3	DF	(Algeria) Rayan Aït-Nouri	9(12)	1	2	0	3(1)	1	14(13)	2	4	0	
4	DF	(Republic of Ireland) Nathan Collins	19(7)	0	2	0	3	0	24(7)	0	2	1	
5	MF	(Gabon) Mario Lemina	17(2)	0	0	0	0	0	17(2)	0	3	1	
6	MF	(Portugal) Bruno Jordão ¤	0	0	0	0	0	0	0	0	0	0	
6	MF	(Mali) Boubacar Traoré ‡	4(6)	0	0	0	0(1)	1	4(7)	1	2	0	
7	FW	(Portugal) Pedro Neto	13(5)	0	0	0	0(1)	0	13(6)	0	1	0	
8	MF	(Portugal) Rúben Neves	33(2)	6	2	0	2(2)	0	39(4)	6	13	0	(Note: Neves was suspended vs Chelsea (h) and Brentford (h) due to accumulating ten yellow cards.)
9	FW	(Mexico) Raúl Jiménez	8(7)	0	2	0	2(1)	3	12(8)	3	0	0	
10	FW	(Portugal) Daniel Podence	20(12)	6	0(1)	0	1(3)	0	21(16)	6	6	0	
11	FW	(South Korea) Hwang Hee-chan	12(15)	3	0(1)	1	3(1)	0	15(16)	4	1	0	
12	FW	(Brazil) Matheus Cunha ‡	12(5)	2	0(2)	0	0(1)	0	12(8)	2	1	0	
13	GK	(Montenegro) Matija Sarkic ¤	0	0	1	0	2	0	3	0	0	0	
14	DF	(Colombia) Yerson Mosquera ¤	0	0	0	0	0	0	0	0	0	0	
15	DF	(Ivory Coast) Willy Boly †	0	0	0	0	0	0	0	0	0	0	
15	DF	(England) Craig Dawson	17	1	0	0	0	0	17	1	4	0	
16	DF	(England) Conor Coady ¤	0	0	0	0	0	0	0	0	0	0	
17	FW	(Portugal) Gonçalo Guedes ¤	8(5)	1	1	1	3(1)	0	12(6)	2	1	0	
18	MF	(England) Morgan Gibbs-White †	2	0	0	0	0	0	2	0	1	0	
18	FW	(Austria) Saša Kalajdžić	1	0	0	0	0	0	1	0	0	0	
19	DF	(Spain) Jonny	14(4)	1	2	0	2(1)	0	18(5)	1	4	1	
20	FW	(Portugal) Chiquinho	0	0	0	0	0	0	0	0	0	0	
21	FW	(Portugal) Fábio Silva ¤	0	0	0	0	0	0	0	0	0	0	
21	MF	(Spain) Pablo Sarabia	9(4)	1	0	0	0	0	9(4)	1	3	0	
22	DF	(Portugal) Nélson Semedo	31(5)	0	0(2)	0	3	0	34(7)	0	11	1	
23	DF	(England) Max Kilman	37	0	0	0	4	0	40	0	4	0	
24	DF	(Portugal) Toti Gomes	10(7)	1	2	0	1	0	13(7)	1	6	0	
25	MF	(Republic of Ireland) Connor Ronan †	0(1)	0	0	0	1	0	1(1)	0	0	0	
25	GK	(England) Dan Bentley	2	0	0	0	0	0	2	0	0	0	
27	MF	(Portugal) Matheus Nunes	30(4)	1	0(2)	0	2(1)	0	32(7)	1	3	1	(Note: The red card issued to Nunes for violent conduct was rescinded on appeal.)
28	MF	(Portugal) João Moutinho	20(11)	0	1	0	3(1)	0	24(12)	0	3	0	
29	FW	(Spain) Diego Costa	17(7)	1	0(1)	0	1	0	18(8)	1	5	1	
30	FW	(Ecuador) Leonardo Campana †	0	0	0	0	0	0	0	0	0	0	
32	MF	(Belgium) Leander Dendoncker †	2(2)	0	0	0	1	0	3(2)	0	0	0	
33	MF	(England) Ryan Giles ¤	0	0	0	0	0	0	0	0	0	0	
34	DF	(England) Dion Sanderson ¤	0	0	0	0	0	0	0	0	0	0	
35	MF	(Brazil) João Gomes	7(4)	1	0	0	0	0	7(4)	1	5	0	
37	FW	(Spain) Adama Traoré	12(22)	2	2	0	2(2)	1	16(24)	3	3	0	
39	MF	(England) Luke Cundle ¤	0	0	0	0	0	0	0	0	0	0	
40	MF	(Japan) Hayao Kawabe ¤	0	0	0	0	0	0	0	0	0	0	
55	GK	(England) Jackson Smith ¤	0	0	0	0	0	0	0	0	0	0	
59	MF	(Republic of Ireland) Joe Hodge	1(5)	0	2	0	2(1)	0	5(6)	0	1	0	
62	GK	(Denmark) Andreas Søndergaard †	0	0	0	0	0	0	0	0	0	0	
63	FW	(Republic of Ireland) Nathan Fraser	0	0	0	0	0	0	0	0	0	0	
64	DF	(Spain) Hugo Bueno	16(5)	0	0(1)	0	1	0	17(6)	0	1	0	
66	MF	(England) Harvey Griffiths	0	0	0	0	0	0	0	0	0	0	
77	FW	(Wales) Chem Campbell ¤	0(5)	0	0	0	0(1)	0	0(6)	0	0	0	
81	DF	(Jamaica) Dexter Lembikisa	0(1)	0	2	0	0(1)	0	2(2)	0	0	0	

== Club awards ==
=== Player of the Month award ===
Voted for by fans on Wolverhampton Wanderers' official website.

Month	Player
August	(Portugal) Rúben Neves
September	(Portugal) Rúben Neves
October	(Spain) Hugo Bueno
November	Not Awarded
December	(Algeria) Rayan Aït-Nouri
January	(Portugal) Daniel Podence
February	(Gabon) Mario Lemina
March	(Portugal) Rúben Neves
April	Not Awarded
May	Not Awarded
