= Maximilian Kilman =

English footballer (born 1997)

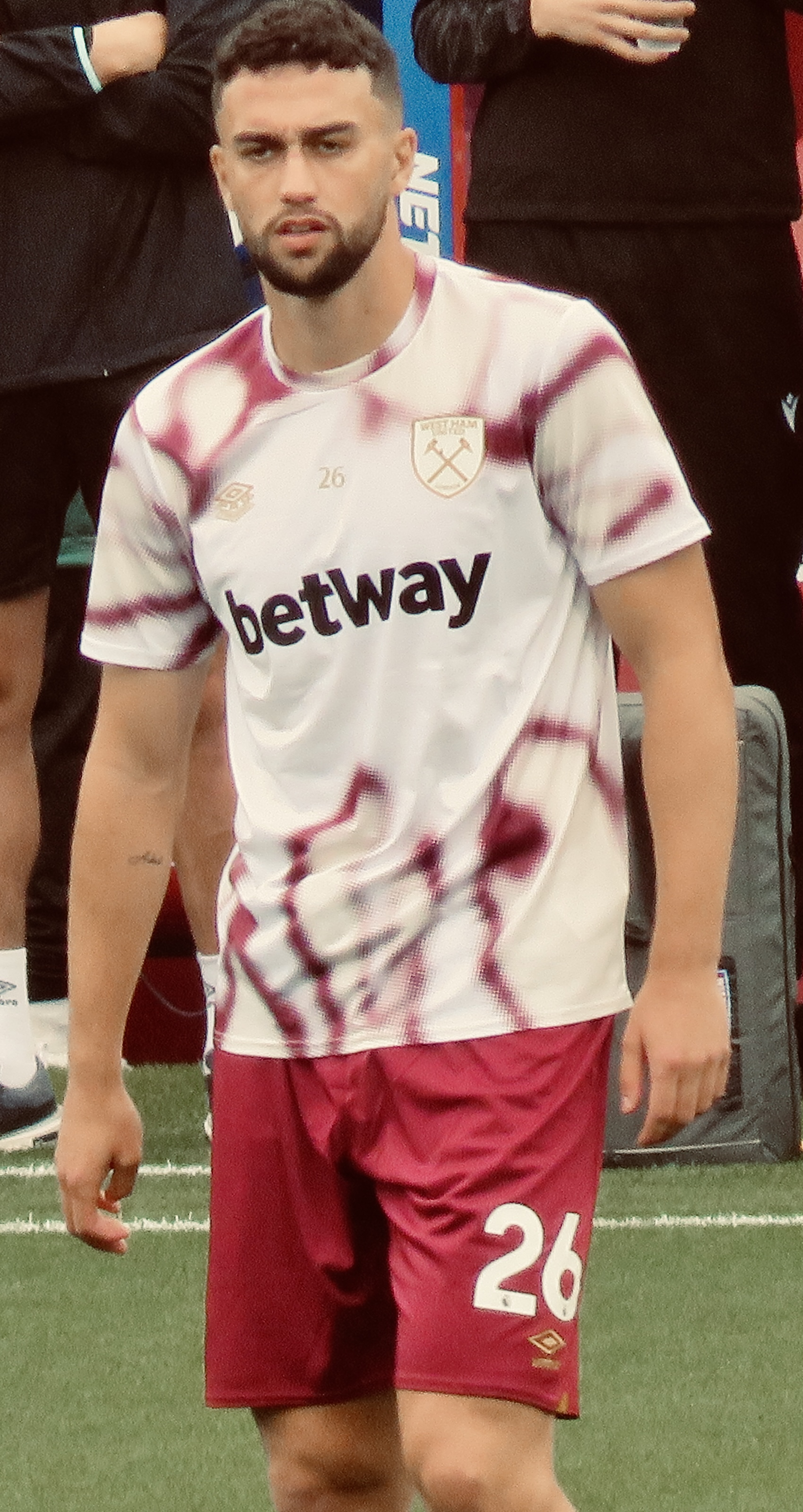
- Kilman with West Ham United in 2024

Personal information
- Full name: Maximilian William Kilman
- Date of birth: 23 May 1997 (age 29)
- Place of birth: Chelsea, London, England
- Height: 6 ft 4 in (1.94 m)
- Position: Centre-back

Team information
- Current team: West Ham United
- Number: 3

Youth career
- 2006-2012: Fulham
- 2012-2014: Gillingham

Senior career*
Years	Team	Apps	(Gls)
2014–2015	Welling United	0	(0)
2015–2018	Maidenhead United	34	(1)
2016–2017	→ Marlow (loan)	30	(1)
2018–2024	Wolverhampton Wanderers	127	(3)
2024–	West Ham United	74	(2)
- * Club domestic league appearances and goals as of 18:02, 7 November 2026 (UTC)

Maximilian William Kilman (born 23 May 1997) is an English professional footballer who plays as a centre-back for EFL Championship club West Ham United.

== Early life ==
Kilman was born in Chelsea, Greater London, to Ukrainian parents. His father was from Odesa, and his mother is from Kyiv. Kilman speaks Russian in addition to English. Kilman grew up in West Ham until the age of nine, before moving to north-west London.

== Club career ==
=== Early career ===
Kilman began his career in the academy at Fulham. As a teenager, he joined futsal club Genesis Futsal Club while continuing to play the 11-a-side game. He later joined the academy at Gillingham before signing for Maidenhead United in 2015, after making a single London Senior Cup appearance for Welling United against Cockfosters in October 2014. Kilman was loaned out to Southern Football League side Marlow for the 2016–17 season.

Kilman returned the following season and made his debut for the Magpies on the opening day of the 2017–18 season against Maidstone United, while continuing his futsal career, signing for Helvécia. He went on to make 39 appearances for Maidenhead before signing for Wolverhampton Wanderers for an undisclosed fee on transfer deadline day in August 2018.

=== Wolverhampton Wanderers ===
Kilman spent the season with the club's under-23 side, helping them to win promotion from the second tier of the Premier League reserve competition. In April 2019, head coach Nuno Espírito Santo stated that "Max is 100 percent integrated into the (first team) squad... I just see him as a very good football player, a centre-half with quality. He's big, aggressive. He has to improve like all young players, but we're really, really happy with Max." Kilman was first included in a senior matchday squad in December 2018, and was an unused substitute on five occasions before he made his senior debut on 4 May 2019, coming on as a last-minute substitute in a 1–0 win against Fulham in the Premier League. In doing so, he became the first player to go directly from non-League to the Premier League, with no loans in between, since Chris Smalling moved from Maidstone United to Fulham in 2008. Kilman made his full senior debut for Wolves in a 4–0 home win against FC Pyunik of Armenia in the 2019–20 UEFA Europa League Qualifying Third Round, Second Leg, on 15 August.

On 21 April 2020, Wolverhampton's Express & Star announced that Kilman's contract with Wolves had been extended until the summer of 2022. On 21 October, Wolves announced that Kilman had extended his contract with the club until the summer of 2025.

On 1 November 2021, Kilman scored the opening goal in Wolves's 2–1 win over Everton at Molineux. The goal, a well-taken header, following a corner from the left from Rayan Aït-Nouri, was Kilman's first for Wolves (in his 44th appearance for the club at senior level) and his first in the Premier League. Four days later, Kilman signed a new long-term deal with Wolves until 2026.

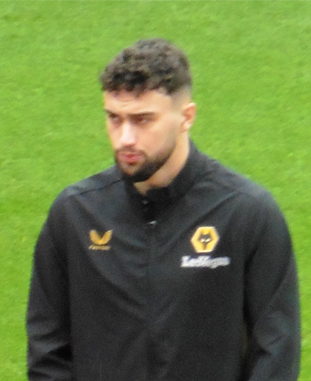
Kilman lines up for Wolverhampton Wanderers in 2024

Kilman made his 100th competitive appearance for Wolves in their 1–0 home win against Chelsea on 8 April 2023.

On 11 August 2023, Wolves announced that Kilman had been appointed club captain (in succession to the recently departed Rúben Neves) and two days later it was announced that Kilman had signed a new five-year contract with Wolves, running until 2028.

Kilman made his 100th Premier League appearance on 4 November 2023, away to Sheffield United. Wolves lost the match 2–1, conceding a penalty deep into time added on at the end of the second-half.

Kilman scored his second Wolves goal, and first since becoming club captain, in the final game of 2023, a 3–0 win against Everton at Molineux in the Premier League on 30 December. In the 2023–24 season, he was one of two outfield players to feature in all 3,420 minutes in the Premier League, along with William Saliba.

=== West Ham United ===
On 6 July 2024, Kilman joined West Ham United by signing a seven-year contract, for a reported £40 million transfer fee. His former club, Maidenhead United, gained £4 million from the deal having inserted a 10% share clause in the contract when Kilman was sold to Wolverhampton Wanderers.

== International career ==
Kilman made his debut for the England national futsal team at the age of 18. He went on to accumulate 25 caps for the Three Lions. Kilman's futsal career was put on hiatus when he signed for Wolves in August 2018. He was also eligible to play international football for Russia or Ukraine through his parents.

In March 2021, Ukraine coach Andriy Shevchenko announced that he had formally asked FIFA to switch Kilman's national allegiance to Ukraine, but also enquired of them as to whether his appearances for the England futsal team would make him ineligible for Ukraine. On 7 April 2021, FIFA rejected the application, confirming that his appearances for England in competitive futsal matches ties him to playing for England in any form of football.

== Career statistics ==
As of match played 4 November 2026

Appearances and goals by club, season and competition
Club	Season	League			FA Cup		EFL Cup		Other		Total	
Club	Season	Division	Apps	Goals	Apps	Goals	Apps	Goals	Apps	Goals	Apps	Goals
Welling United	2014–15	Conference Premier	0	0	0	0	—		1 (Note: Appearance in London Senior Cup)	0	1	0
Maidenhead United	2015–16	National League South	0	0	0	0	—		0	0	0	0
Maidenhead United	2016–17	National League South	0	0	0	0	—		2 (Note: Appearances in Berks & Bucks Senior Cup)	0	2	0
Maidenhead United	2017–18	National League	33	1	1	0	—		5 (Note: Four appearances in FA Trophy, one appearance in Berks & Bucks Senior Cup)	0	39	1
Maidenhead United	2018–19	National League	1	0	0	0	—		0	0	1	0
Maidenhead United	Total		34	1	1	0	—		7	0	42	1
Marlow (loan)	2016–17	Southern League Division One Central	30	1	0	0	—		2 (Note: One appearance in FA Trophy, one appearance in Southern League Division One Central play-offs)	0	32	1
Wolverhampton Wanderers U21	2018–19	—			—		—		3 (Note: Appearances in EFL Trophy)	0	3	0
Wolverhampton Wanderers	2018–19	Premier League	1	0	0	0	0	0	—		1	0
Wolverhampton Wanderers	2019–20	Premier League	3	0	1	0	2	0	5 (Note: Appearances in UEFA Europa League)	0	11	0
Wolverhampton Wanderers	2020–21	Premier League	18	0	2	0	0	0	—		20	0
Wolverhampton Wanderers	2021–22	Premier League	30	1	2	0	2	0	—		34	1
Wolverhampton Wanderers	2022–23	Premier League	37	0	0	0	4	0	—		41	0
Wolverhampton Wanderers	2023–24	Premier League	38	2	5	0	1	0	—		44	2
Wolverhampton Wanderers	Total		127	3	10	0	9	0	5	0	151	3
West Ham United	2024–25	Premier League	38	0	1	0	2	0	—		41	0
West Ham United	2025–26	Premier League	21	0	3	0	1	0	—		25	0
West Ham United	2026–27	Championship	14	2	0	0	3	0	—		17	2
West Ham United	Total		73	2	4	0	6	0	—		83	2
Career total			263	6	15	0	15	0	18	0	312	7
