= He Zhenyu =

Chinese footballer (born 2001)

Personal information
- Full name: He Zhenyu
- Date of birth: 28 June 2001 (age 25)
- Place of birth: Shenyang, Liaoning, China
- Height: 1.80 m (5 ft 11 in)
- Position: Forward

Team information
- Current team: Yanbian Longding
- Number: 8

Youth career
- 2012–2018: Notts County
- 2018–2019: Wolverhampton Wanderers

Senior career*
Years	Team	Apps	(Gls)
2019–2023	Wolverhampton Wanderers	0	(0)
2021	→ Beijing Guoan (loan)	10	(0)
2023–2024	Changchun Yatai	2	(0)
2026–	Yanbian Longding	0	(0)

International career
2019	China U-18	2	(0)
- * Club domestic league appearances and goals as of 19:23, 13 September 2024

He Zhenyu (Chinese: 何朕宇; born 28 June 2001), also known as Dongda He, is a Chinese professional footballer who plays as a forward for China League One club Yanbian Longding.

== Club career ==
=== Wolverhampton Wanderers ===
On 10 August 2018, Wolverhampton Wanderers signed Dongda He for an undisclosed fee from Notts County.

On 16 April 2020, He signed a new contract with Wolves until the summer of 2023.

=== Beijing Guoan (loan) ===
In February 2021, He was loaned to Chinese Super League side Beijing Guoan. He's first appearance for the club was the first game of the season in a 2–1 away loss against Shanghai Shenhua where he came off the bench for Cédric Bakambu in the 77th minute.

=== Changchun Yatai ===
On 7 April 2023, He permanently signed for Chinese Super League club Changchun Yatai.

=== Retirement ===
In 2025, He decided to retire from professional football at the age of 24.

=== Yanbian Longding ===
On 22 July 2026, He returned to professional football and joined China League One side Yanbian Longding.

== Career statistics ==
As of match played 31 January 2023

Appearances and goals by club, season and competition
Club	Season	League			FA Cup		League Cup		Other		Total	
Club	Season	Division	Apps	Goals	Apps	Goals	Apps	Goals	Apps	Goals	Apps	Goals
Wolverhampton Wanderers	2019–20	Premier League	0	0	0	0	0	0	0	0	0	0
Wolverhampton Wanderers	2020–21	Premier League	0	0	0	0	0	0	0	0	0	0
Wolverhampton Wanderers	2021–22	Premier League	0	0	0	0	0	0	0	0	0	0
Wolverhampton Wanderers	2022–23	Premier League	0	0	0	0	0	0	0	0	0	0
Wolverhampton Wanderers	Total		0	0	0	0	0	0	0	0	0	0
Wolverhampton Wanderers U21s	2019–20 EFL Trophy		—		—		—		1 (Note: Appearances in EFL Trophy)	0	1	0
Beijing Guoan (loan)	2021	Chinese Super League	10	0	0	0	—		0	0	10	0
Career total			10	0	0	0	0	0	1	0	11	0
