= Diana Gomes =

Diana Gomes may refer to:

- Diana Gomes (footballer) (born 1998), Portuguese footballer
- Diana Gomes (swimmer) (born 1989), Portuguese swimmer

== See also ==
- Diana Gómez, Spanish actress
