= Rúben Neves =

Portuguese footballer (born 1997)

- Neves at the 2026 FIFA World Cup

Personal information
- Full name: Rúben Diogo da Silva Neves
- Date of birth: 13 March 1997 (age 29)
- Place of birth: Mozelos, Portugal
- Height: 1.80 m (5 ft 11 in)
- Position: Defensive midfielder

Team information
- Current team: Al-Hilal
- Number: 8

Youth career
- 2005–2014: Porto
- 2012–2013: → Padroense (loan)

Senior career*
Years	Team	Apps	(Gls)
2014–2017	Porto	59	(3)
2017–2023	Wolverhampton Wanderers	219	(27)
2023–	Al-Hilal	100	(20)

International career^{‡}
2012	Portugal U15	2	(0)
2012–2013	Portugal U16	10	(1)
2012–2014	Portugal U17	31	(2)
2013	Portugal U18	2	(0)
2014–2017	Portugal U21	23	(4)
2016	Portugal U23	1	(1)
2015–	Portugal	75	(1)
Medal record
Men's football
Representing Portugal
UEFA Nations League
Winner	2019 Portugal
Winner	2025 Germany
- * Club domestic league appearances and goals as of 21:02, 31 October 2026 (UTC) ‡ National team caps and goals as of 23:12, 17 November 2026 (UTC)

Rúben Diogo da Silva Neves (Portuguese pronunciation: [nɛvʃ], born 13 March 1997) is a Portuguese professional footballer who plays as a defensive midfielder for Saudi Pro League club Al-Hilal and the Portugal national team.

Neves started his career with Porto and made his first-team debut at the age of 17. He joined Wolverhampton Wanderers in 2017 for a reported transfer fee of £15.8 million. He made 253 appearances and scored 30 goals for them, winning the EFL Championship in his first season. In 2023, he signed for Al-Hilal for a fee of £47 million.

Neves made more than 60 appearances for Portugal's national youth teams. He made his senior international debut for Portugal at the age of 18 in 2015, and was part of their squads at the UEFA European Championship in 2020 and 2024, and the FIFA World Cup in 2022 and 2026. He also won the UEFA Nations League in 2019 and 2025.

== Club career ==
=== Porto ===
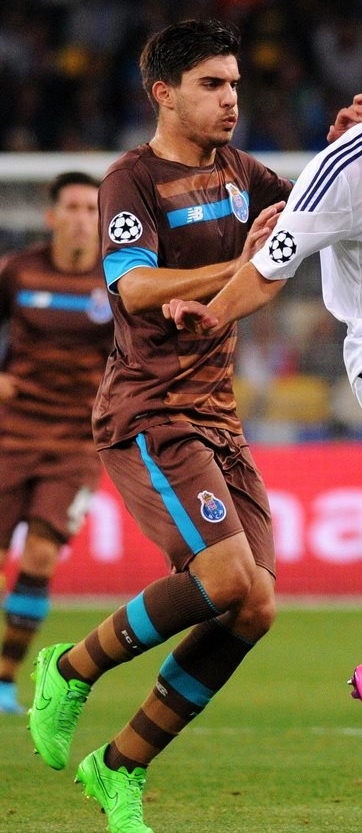
Neves playing for Porto in 2015

Born in Mozelos, Aveiro District, Neves grew up supporting Porto and joined the club's youth system at the age of eight. During his time with the academy, he also spent a season on loan at Padroense which acted as the under-16 team; on his time in the youth structures, reserve team manager Luís Castro described him as a player with "extraordinary mental qualities, to go along with technical and tactical skills".

Ahead of the 2014–15 season, Neves was earmarked to bypass Porto's under-19s and play with the reserves instead. Following an injury to teammate Mikel Agu, however, he was called by Julen Lopetegui to be part of the main squad's pre-season preparations. On 15 August 2014, aged 17 years and five months, he made his Primeira Liga debut where he started and scored in a 2–0 home win against Marítimo – in doing so, he became the youngest player in the club's history to score a goal in the competition. He played his first match in the UEFA Champions League five days later in a 1–0 win over Lille, and broke another record, previously held by Cristiano Ronaldo, by being the youngest Portuguese to appear in the tournament.

On 10 December 2014, during a Champions League group stage fixture against Shakhtar Donetsk, Neves suffered an injury to his right knee following a collision in midfield with Alex Teixeira. At the end of the game, the club explained that he suffered a sprain, with apparent damage to the internal lateral ligament. After spending nearly a month on the sidelines, he returned to the pitch in a 3–1 home win over União da Madeira in the Taça da Liga. Following his injury, his role in midfield was filled by Casemiro and he spent the majority of the remainder of the season behind the Brazilian in the pecking order.

On 20 October 2015, aged 18 years and 221 days, Neves became the youngest player to start as captain in the Champions League, helping Porto to a 2–0 win against Maccabi Tel Aviv in the group stage and surpassing previous record holder Rafael van der Vaart, who held it since 16 September 2003. On 5 December, in a 2–1 win over Paços de Ferreira also at the Estádio do Dragão, he broke another record by becoming the youngest player to make 50 appearances for the club, surpassing players like Fernando Gomes and Jaime Magalhães.

=== Wolverhampton Wanderers ===
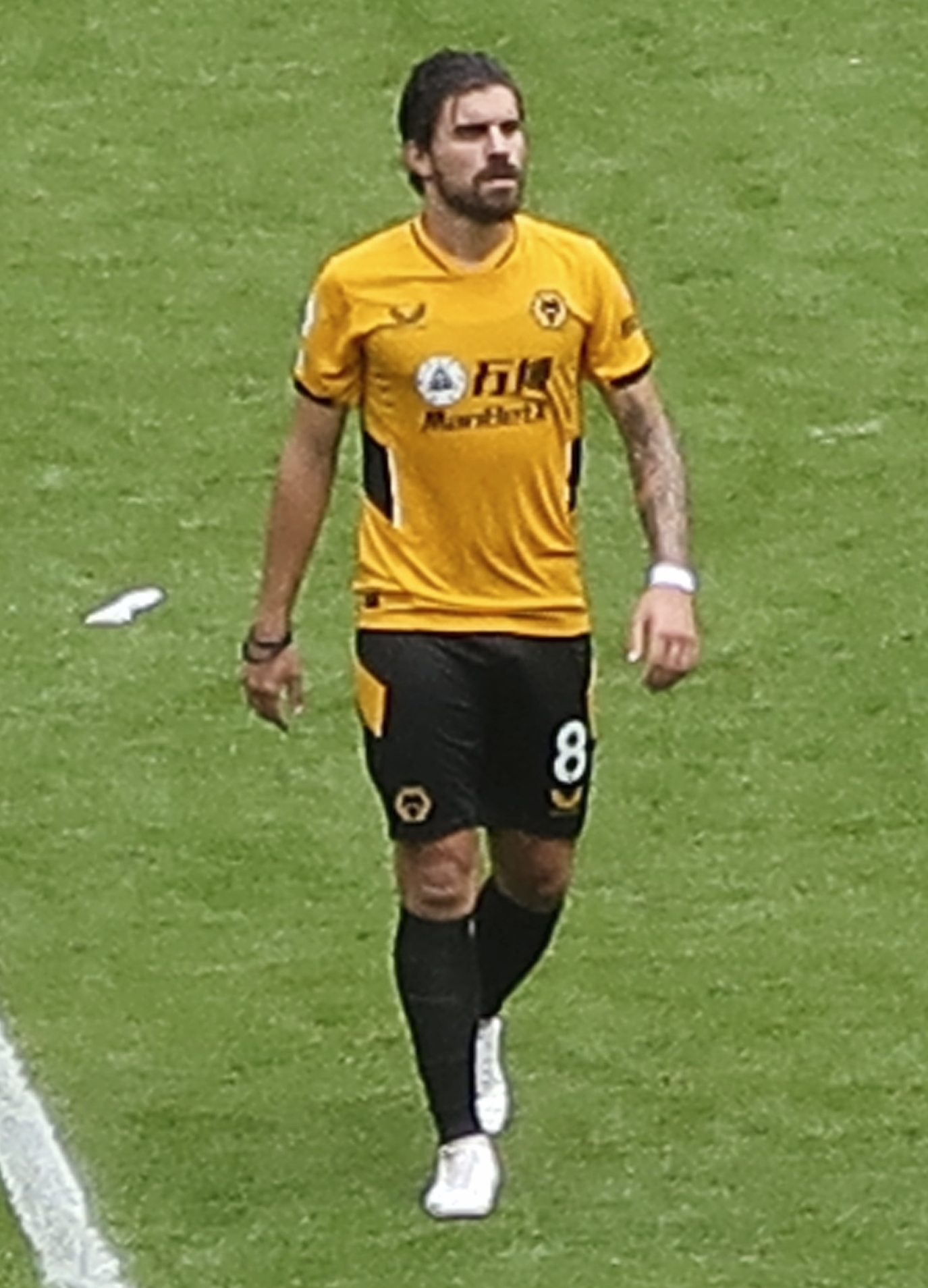
Neves playing for Wolverhampton Wanderers in 2021

On 8 July 2017, Neves signed for EFL Championship club Wolverhampton Wanderers for an undisclosed fee, believed to be in the region of £15.8 million – a club and league record fee. Upon joining, he was reunited with former Porto manager Nuno Espírito Santo. He scored his first goal on 15 August, in a 3–2 away win over Hull City. In April 2018, Neves was nominated for the EFL Championship Player of the Season and Young Player of the Season awards, and was also included in the Team of the Season along with teammates Conor Coady and John Ruddy. His team was ultimately promoted as champions with the player scoring 6 goals in 42 appearances, all of which were scored from outside of the box. At the conclusion of the season, he claimed a hat-trick of club awards as he walked away with the Player of the Season, Player's Player of the Season and Goal of the Season accolades. He was also awarded the EFL Goal of the Year award for 2018 for his goal against Derby County at Molineux on 11 April 2018.

Wolves announced that Neves had signed a new contract in July 2018, extending until June 2023. In the first match of the new season, he scored his first Premier League goal and assisted Raúl Jiménez in the latter's competitive debut, as his team twice came from behind to draw 2–2 against Everton. His appearance in the match, alongside compatriots Rui Patrício, João Moutinho, Diogo Jota and Hélder Costa, also saw the club break the league record for the most Portuguese players named in a starting line-up.

On 6 October 2018, Neves made his 50th appearance for Wolves and marked the occasion by contributing in the build-up for Matt Doherty's winning goal in a 1–0 victory over Crystal Palace. The following January, his 55th-minute winning goal against Liverpool at Molineux in the FA Cup, "a venomous dipping shot from 31 yards (28 m) that beat Simon Mignolet at his near post", was voted the best goal of the third round by visitors to BBC Sport's website.

On 25 September 2019, Neves was made Wolves' club captain for the first time, when he led the team in the absence of regular captain Conor Coady as Wolves secured progression to the 2019–20 EFL Cup fourth round with a penalty shoot-out victory over Reading at Molineux in the third round. He made his 100th appearance in the Premier League in a goalless draw at Aston Villa on 6 March 2021. That May, it was revealed that his contract was in fact running until 2024.

Neves made his 200th competitive appearance for Wolves in all competitions in 2–0 win away to Tottenham Hotspur in the Premier League on 13 February 2022. On 13 March, his 25th birthday, he assisted the only goal by Coady in a victory at Everton that constituted Wolves's 1,000th win in top-flight football (over 67 seasons dating back to 1888) and also sealed the club's first league double over that opponent since 1972–73. Days later, his knee injury from the first half of a home game against Leeds United ruled him out for a month. He returned on 30 April against Brighton & Hove Albion, but was substituted at half-time.

In the first game of the 2022–23 season against Leeds United on 6 August 2022, Neves took the captain's armband as Conor Coady was kept on the substitutes' bench. He was made Wolves’ captain on a full-time basis after the defender departed on loan to Everton. Neves scored his first goal of the season, and his twenty-fifth in a Wolves shirt, in a 1–1 Premier League draw with Newcastle United at Molineux on 28 August.

In May 2023, with uncertainty over his future and one year remaining on his contract, Neves publicly said that he wanted to play in the Champions League. He was linked with Barcelona.

=== Al Hilal ===
On 23 June 2023, Wolves confirmed Neves' departure from the club. Saudi Arabia's Al Hilal confirmed the transfer which set a new record sale for Wolverhampton Wanderers reported to be £47 million. In his debut season, he helped his club secure the Saudi Pro League title, the King's Cup, and the Saudi Super Cup. On 4 February 2026, he extended his contract until 2029.

== International career ==
=== Youth ===
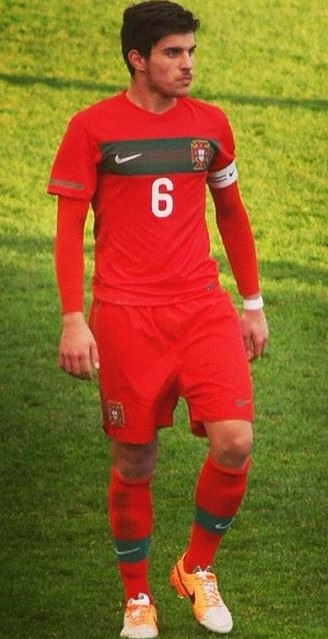
Neves playing for Portugal U17 in 2014

Neves represented Portugal at the 2014 UEFA European Under-17 Championship, helping the country reach the semi-finals as captain. For his performances, he was named among the top ten talents of the tournament by a selection of UEFA reporters.

On 29 August 2014, still aged 17, Neves was called by coach Rui Jorge to be part of the under-21 team. He scored his first goal on 14 October in a 5–4 home win against the Netherlands in the play-off round of the 2015 UEFA European Under-21 Championship.

When the finals began in the Czech Republic, Neves broke a new record by becoming the youngest player to debut for the Portuguese under-21s in the tournament, aged 18 years and 3 months, playing five minutes to help beat England 1–0 in the group stage opener. It was his only appearance, as Portugal reached the final, which they lost to Sweden in a penalty shoot-out.

=== Senior ===
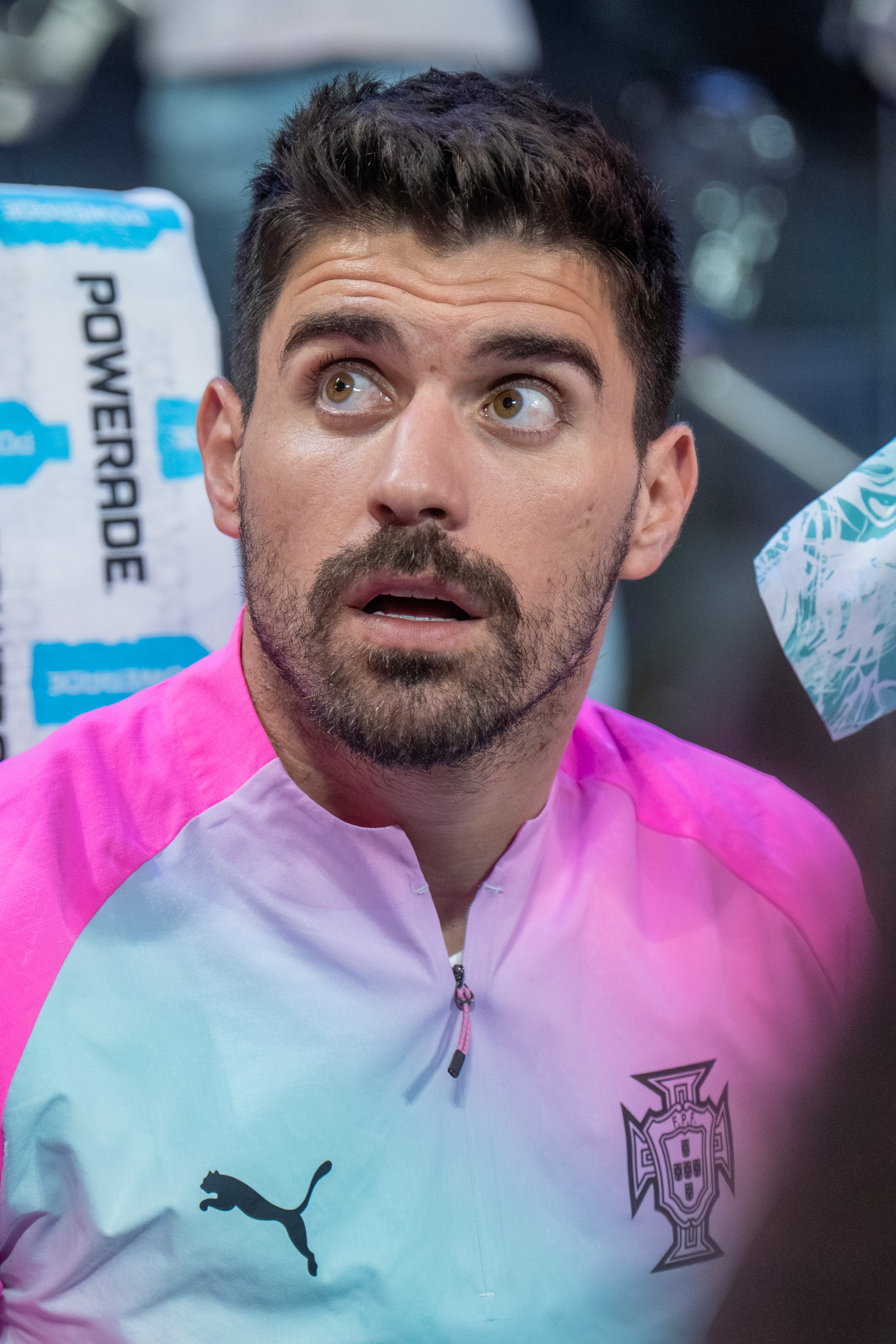
Neves with Portugal in 2026

Neves was first called up to the senior team on 10 November 2015, ahead of friendlies against Russia and Luxembourg as an injury replacement for João Moutinho. He made his debut in the former match, featuring 17 minutes in the 1–0 loss in Krasnodar, before playing the entire 2–0 win against the latter at the Stade Josy Barthel, sharing the midfield with Porto teammates Danilo Pereira and André André.

Neves was selected by manager Fernando Santos for a preliminary 35-man squad for the 2018 FIFA World Cup, but did not make the final 23-man squad.

At the 2019 UEFA Nations League Finals on home soil, Neves played in the 3–1 semi-final win over Switzerland, but was dropped from the starting eleven for the final against the Netherlands for the more defensive Danilo. In that match at his former club ground the Dragão, he came on in added time for William Carvalho as the Portuguese won 1–0.

Neves was one of four Wolves players included in the Portugal squad for UEFA Euro 2020. He made his sole appearance in the delayed competition on 23 June, as a substitute in a 2–2 group draw with France in Budapest.

Neves was chosen for the 2022 FIFA World Cup in Qatar.

He played for Portugal in the 2025 UEFA Nations League Finals, scoring the winning penalty in the final shoot-out against rivals Spain, following a 2–2 draw.

On 29 August 2025, it was announced that Neves would wear the number 21 shirt in honour of former teammate and close friend Diogo Jota, who died in a car crash two months prior.

On 11 October 2025, Neves scored his first senior international goal, a stoppage-time header assisted by Francisco Trincão, in Portugal's 1–0 home victory against the Republic of Ireland during 2026 FIFA World Cup qualification.

On 19 May 2026, Neves was selected in the 26-man squad for the 2026 FIFA World Cup.

== Style of play ==
An article on UEFA's website described Neves as a defensive midfielder who is not afraid to go forward and prompt attacks, showing great maturity combined with an accurate passing skill, great vision and an astute sense of positioning. His playing attributes also granted him comparisons to Portuguese international teammate João Moutinho for his fine first touch, similar desire to press his opponents and excellent distribution. Neves also drew praise in the media for his technical, tactical and mental qualities, as well as his intelligence and long-range shooting ability.

== Career statistics ==
=== Club ===
As of match played 19 October 2026

Appearances and goals by club, season and competition
Club	Season	League			National cup (Note: Includes Taça de Portugal, FA Cup, King's Cup)		League cup (Note: Includes Taça da Liga, EFL Cup)		Continental		Other		Total	
Club	Season	Division	Apps	Goals	Apps	Goals	Apps	Goals	Apps	Goals	Apps	Goals	Apps	Goals
Porto	2014–15	Primeira Liga	24	1	1	0	3	0	9 (Note: Appearances in UEFA Champions League)	0	—		37	1
Porto	2015–16	Primeira Liga	22	1	6	1	2	0	8 (Note: Six appearances in UEFA Champions League, two appearances in UEFA Europa League)	0	—		38	2
Porto	2016–17	Primeira Liga	13	1	0	0	2	0	3	0	—		18	1
Porto	Total		59	3	7	1	7	0	20	0	—		93	4
Wolverhampton Wanderers	2017–18	Championship	42	6	0	0	0	0	—		—		42	6
Wolverhampton Wanderers	2018–19	Premier League	35	4	5	1	0	0	—		—		40	5
Wolverhampton Wanderers	2019–20	Premier League	38	2	2	0	1	0	13 (Note: Appearances in UEFA Europa League)	2	—		54	4
Wolverhampton Wanderers	2020–21	Premier League	36	5	3	0	1	0	—		—		40	5
Wolverhampton Wanderers	2021–22	Premier League	33	4	2	0	1	0	—		—		36	4
Wolverhampton Wanderers	2022–23	Premier League	35	6	2	0	4	0	—		—		41	6
Wolverhampton Wanderers	Total		219	27	14	1	7	0	13	2	—		253	30
Al-Hilal	2023–24	Saudi Pro League	32	3	5	2	—		9 (Note: Appearances in AFC Champions League)	2	8 (Note: Six appearances and one goal in Arab Club Champions Cup, two appearances in Saudi Super Cup)	1	54	8
Al-Hilal	2024–25	Saudi Pro League	26	1	1	0	—		9	0	7 (Note: Two appearances in Saudi Super Cup, five appearances and one goal in FIFA Club World Cup)	1	43	2
Al-Hilal	2025–26	Saudi Pro League	31	11	4	1	—		8	0	—		43	12
Al-Hilal	2026–27	Saudi Pro League	9	3	1	2	—		2	2	—		12	7
Al-Hilal	Total		98	18	11	5	—		28	4	15	2	152	29
Career total			376	48	32	7	14	0	61	6	15	2	498	63

=== International ===
As of match played 17 November 2026

Appearances and goals by national team and year
National team	Year	Apps	Goals
Portugal	2015	2	0
Portugal	2016	0	0
Portugal	2017	2	0
Portugal	2018	5	0
Portugal	2019	7	0
Portugal	2020	2	0
Portugal	2021	8	0
Portugal	2022	11	0
Portugal	2023	8	0
Portugal	2024	9	0
Portugal	2025	9	1
Portugal	2026	12	0
Total		75	1

As of match played 4 October 2026
Portugal score listed first, score column indicates score after each Neves goal

List of international goals scored by Rúben Neves
No.	Date	Venue	Cap	Opponent	Score	Result	Competition
1	11 October 2025	Estádio José Alvalade, Lisbon, Portugal	60	Republic of Ireland	1–0	1–0	2026 FIFA World Cup qualification

== Honours ==
Wolverhampton Wanderers

- EFL Championship: 2017–18

Al-Hilal

- Saudi Pro League: 2023–24
- King's Cup: 2023–24, 2025–26
- Saudi Super Cup: 2023, 2024

Portugal U21

- UEFA European Under-21 Championship runner-up: 2015

Portugal

- UEFA Nations League: 2018–19, 2024–25

Individual

- UEFA European Under-17 Championship Team of the Tournament: 2014
- Confederação do Desporto de Portugal Young Prospect of the Year: 2015
- EFL Championship Team of the Season: 2017–18
- EFL Team of the Season: 2017–18
- PFA Team of the Year: 2017–18 Championship
- Saudi Pro League Team of the Season: 2023–24, 2025–26
