= Pedro Neto =

Portuguese footballer (born 2000)

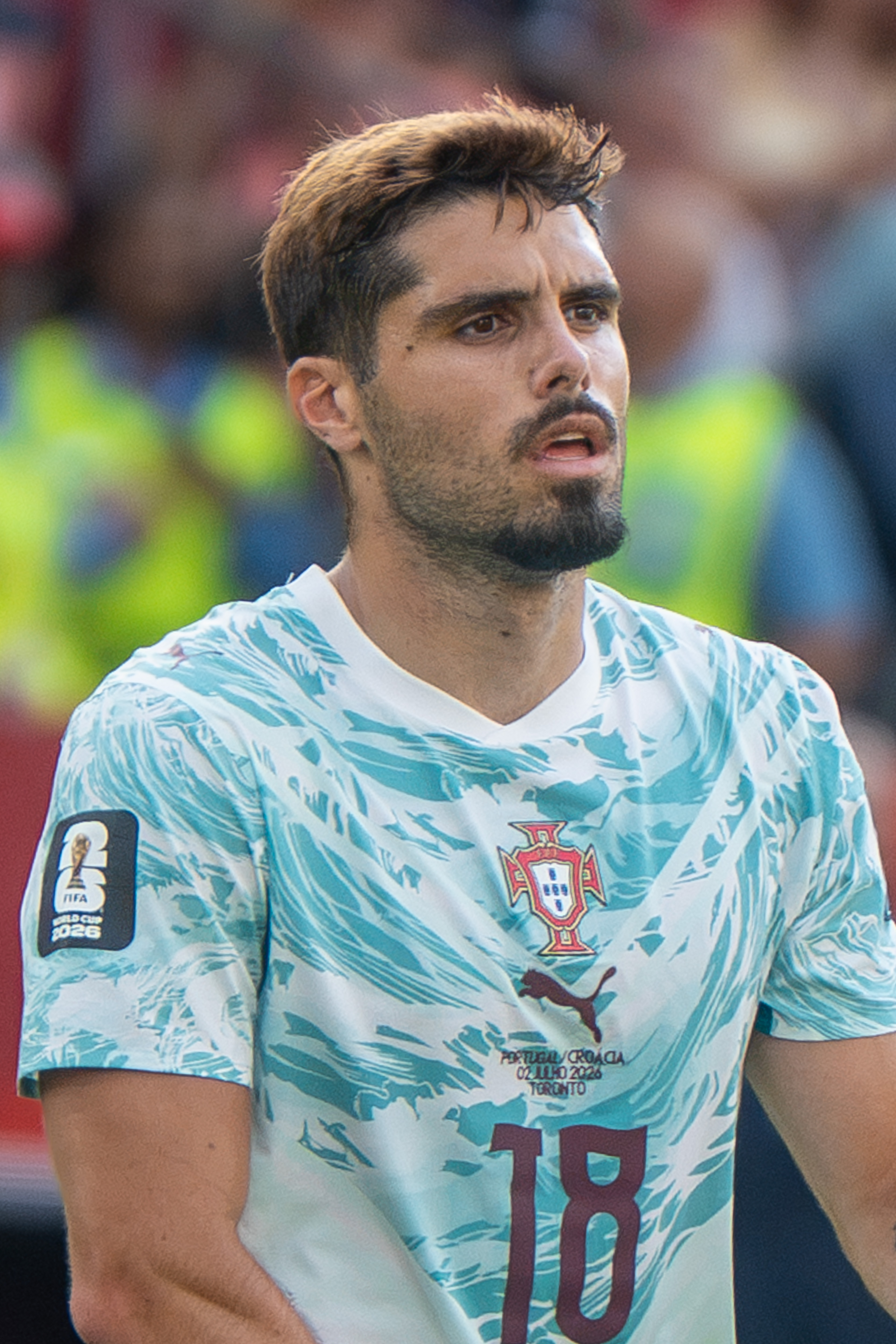
- Neto with Portugal in 2026

Personal information
- Full name: Pedro Lomba Neto
- Date of birth: 9 March 2000 (age 26)
- Place of birth: Viana do Castelo, Portugal
- Height: 1.72 m (5 ft 8 in)
- Position: Winger

Team information
- Current team: Chelsea
- Number: 7

Youth career
- 2008–2010: Vianense
- 2010–2013: Perspectiva em Jogo
- 2013–2015: Braga
- 2015–2016: Palmeiras Braga
- 2016–2017: Braga

Senior career*
Years	Team	Apps	(Gls)
2017	Braga B	1	(0)
2017–2019	Braga	3	(1)
2017–2019	→ Lazio (loan)	4	(0)
2019–2024	Wolverhampton Wanderers	111	(11)
2024–	Chelsea	80	(12)

International career^{‡}
2016–2017	Portugal U17	9	(1)
2017–2018	Portugal U18	3	(0)
2017–2019	Portugal U19	7	(4)
2017–2019	Portugal U20	12	(2)
2019–2023	Portugal U21	10	(3)
2020–	Portugal	35	(4)
Medal record
Men's football
Representing Portugal
UEFA Nations League
Winner	2025 Germany
- * Club domestic league appearances and goals as of 16:45, 21 November 2026 (UTC) ‡ National team caps and goals as of 21:40, 17 November 2026 (UTC)

Pedro Lomba Neto (European Portuguese: [ˈpeðɾu ˈnɛtu]; born 9 March 2000) is a Portuguese professional footballer who plays as a winger for Premier League club Chelsea and the Portugal national team.

He started his career at Braga, who loaned him to Italian club Lazio in the summer of 2017. In 2019, he signed with Wolverhampton Wanderers, where he dealt with several injury problems. In August 2024, he joined Chelsea, winning the UEFA Conference League and the FIFA Club World Cup in his first season.

After representing Portugal at youth level, Neto made his full debut in November 2020, scoring in his first match. He was selected for UEFA Euro 2024 and the 2026 FIFA World Cup, and won the 2024–25 UEFA Nations League.

== Club career ==
=== Braga ===
Born in Viana do Castelo, Neto joined Braga's youth system at the age of 13. On 7 May 2017, while still a junior, he made his professional debut with their reserves, coming on as a second-half substitute in a 2–3 home loss against Porto B in the Segunda Liga. The following weekend, in his first Primeira Liga appearance with the first team, he scored after only a few minutes on the pitch, helping the hosts defeat already relegated Nacional 4–0 and becoming the club's youngest ever goal scorer in the competition.

On 31 August 2017, both Neto and teammate Bruno Jordão were loaned to Lazio of Italy for two years, with an obligation to buy both players for a combined €26 million. He only played his first match in Serie A on 27 January 2019, replacing Bastos in the last-minute of the 1–2 home loss to Juventus.

=== Wolverhampton Wanderers ===
On 2 August 2019, Neto signed with Wolverhampton Wanderers. He made his debut twelve days later in the second leg of the UEFA Europa League third qualifying round against Pyunik, scoring and providing an assist for Morgan Gibbs-White in a 4–0 home win (8–0 aggregate). His maiden appearance in the Premier League took place a few days later in the same month, when he came on for compatriot Diogo Jota late on in the 1–1 home draw with Manchester United.

Neto's first league start occurred on 28 September 2019, when he assisted Matt Doherty's opening goal in a 2–0 victory over Watford at Molineux. After having what would have been his first goal in the competition ruled out controversially by VAR at Liverpool on 29 December, he scored in the next game (a 2–1 away loss to Watford on 1 January 2020), becoming the first teenager to achieve the feat for the club in the Premier League in the process.

On 4 October 2020, Neto scored his first league goal for Wolves in the 2020–21 campaign in the 1–0 home defeat of Fulham. A month later, he extended his contract to 2025.

Neto was Sky Sports' player of the match in a league game with Arsenal on 29 November 2020, in which he scored once and set up Daniel Podence for his team's second goal in the game as they ran out 2–1 winners in their first away victory against that opposition since 1979. He suffered a serious knee injury in the first half of the 1–0 away defeat of Fulham on 9 April 2021, which ruled him out for the remainder of that season and the bulk of the following. He finally returned on 20 February 2022, as a second-half substitute in a 2–1 home win over Leicester City.

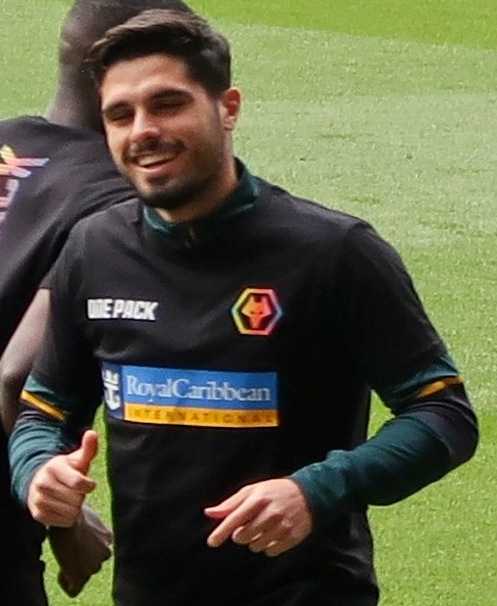
Neto with Wolverhampton Wanderers in 2022

On 9 March 2022, Neto's 22nd birthday, he agreed to a new deal running until 2027. On 22 May, the last day of the campaign, he scored his first goal for the club since his injury, opening an eventual 3–1 loss at Liverpool in the third minute.

Neto made his 100th competitive appearance on 17 September 2022, in a 3–0 home defeat against Manchester City. The following month, he suffered an ankle injury that required surgery and sidelined him for nearly five months. He returned to action on 4 March 2023, playing the first half of the 1–0 home win over Tottenham Hotspur.

Neto played his 100th match in the English top tier on 21 October 2023, in a 2–1 away victory against Bournemouth where he also assisted Matheus Cunha, his sixth decisive pass of the new season. He scored his first-ever FA Cup goal on 28 January 2024, opening the 2–0 win at West Bromwich Albion in the fourth round.

=== Chelsea ===
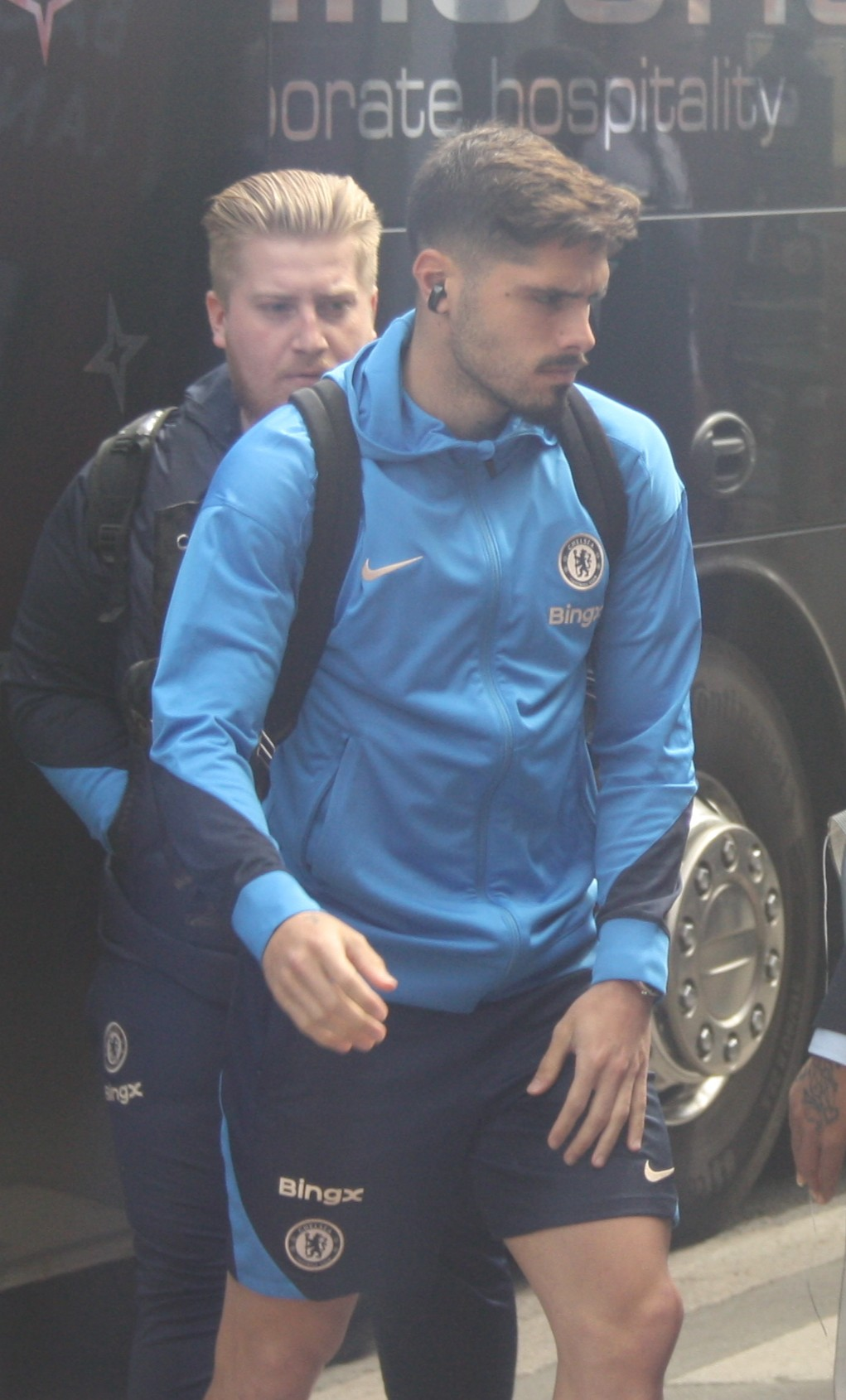
Neto with Chelsea in 2025

On 11 August 2024, Neto moved to Chelsea on a seven-year contract; the deal was reported to be worth £51.3 million with £2.6 million in potential bonuses. His first competitive appearance took place seven days later, as a substitute in a 2–0 league home loss against Manchester City. He scored his first goal on 24 September, in the 5–0 victory over League Two side Barrow in the third round of the EFL Cup; he finished his debut campaign with nine from 51 games, including one in seven matches in a victorious run in the UEFA Conference League and three in the FIFA Club World Cup that was also won.

Neto scored his first senior hat-trick on 13 February 2026, in a 4–0 win at Hull City that saw Chelsea advance to the FA Cup fifth round. On 1 March, he was sent off for two yellow cards after tackling Gabriel Martinelli in the 70th minute of the 2–1 away loss against Arsenal in a London derby.

== International career ==
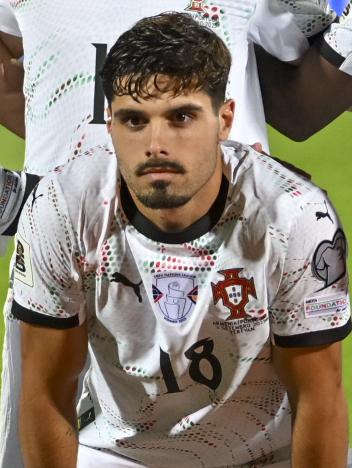
Neto lining up for Portugal in 2025

On 5 September 2019, aged 19, Neto won his first cap for Portugal at under-21 level, playing the first half of a 4–0 win against Gibraltar in the 2021 UEFA European Championship qualification campaign, held in Alverca do Ribatejo. On 5 November 2020, he had his first call-up to the senior team, for matches against Andorra and France. He debuted on 11 November in a 7–0 home friendly victory over the former, scored the first goal and became the first player born in the 2000s to represent the nation.

Neto was ruled out of the 2022 FIFA World Cup due to an injury suffered with his club. In spite of recurrent physical problems in the next years, he was however selected for UEFA Euro 2024 by new manager Roberto Martínez. In the opening match against the Czech Republic, he came off the bench in the 90th minute and created the winning goal for Francisco Conceição two minutes later, which secured a 2–1 victory; also in the group phase, he featured the last 45 minutes of the 3–0 win over Turkey and 75 against Georgia (2–0 loss).

Neto was selected for Portugal's squad at the 2025 UEFA Nations League Finals. He started both games for the champions, including the 5–3 penalty shootout defeat of Spain in the final.

Neto was included in the 2026 World Cup squad. He made five starting appearances in a round-of-16 exit.

On 17 November 2026, Neto equalised an eventual 3–2 win in Wales in the Nations League group stage late in the first half. He was sent off with 20 minutes left due to two quick yellow cards.

== Personal life ==
Neto's uncle, Sérgio Lomba, was also a footballer.

== Career statistics ==
=== Club ===
As of match played 21 November 2026

Appearances and goals by club, season and competition
Club	Season	League			National cup (Note: Includes Coppa Italia, FA Cup)		League cup (Note: Includes EFL Cup)		Europe		Other		Total	
Club	Season	Division	Apps	Goals	Apps	Goals	Apps	Goals	Apps	Goals	Apps	Goals	Apps	Goals
Braga B	2016–17	LigaPro	1	0	0	0	0	0	0	0	—		1	0
Braga	2016–17	Primeira Liga	2	1	0	0	0	0	0	0	—		2	1
Braga	2017–18	Primeira Liga	1	0	0	0	0	0	0	0	—		1	0
Braga	Total		3	1	0	0	0	0	0	0	—		3	1
Lazio (loan)	2018–19	Serie A	4	0	1	0	—		0	0	—		5	0
Wolverhampton Wanderers	2019–20	Premier League	29	3	2	0	2	0	11 (Note: Appearances in UEFA Europa League)	2	—		44	5
Wolverhampton Wanderers	2020–21	Premier League	31	5	3	0	1	0	—		—		35	5
Wolverhampton Wanderers	2021–22	Premier League	13	1	0	0	0	0	—		—		13	1
Wolverhampton Wanderers	2022–23	Premier League	18	0	0	0	1	0	—		—		19	0
Wolverhampton Wanderers	2023–24	Premier League	20	2	4	1	0	0	—		—		24	3
Wolverhampton Wanderers	Total		111	11	9	1	4	0	11	2	—		135	14
Chelsea	2024–25	Premier League	35	4	2	0	1	1	7 (Note: Appearances in UEFA Conference League)	1	6 (Note: Appearances in FIFA Club World Cup)	3	51	9
Chelsea	2025–26	Premier League	34	5	6	4	4	1	8 (Note: Appearances in UEFA Champions League)	0	—		52	10
Chelsea	2026–27	Premier League	11	3	0	0	3	1	—		—		14	4
Chelsea	Total		80	12	8	4	8	3	15	1	6	3	117	23
Career total			199	24	18	5	12	3	26	3	6	3	261	38

=== International ===
As of match played 17 November 2026

Appearances and goals by national team and year
National team	Year	Apps	Goals
Portugal	2020	1	1
Portugal	2021	2	0
Portugal	2022	0	0
Portugal	2023	2	0
Portugal	2024	9	1
Portugal	2025	7	0
Portugal	2026	14	2
Total		35	4

As of match played 17 November 2026
Portugal score listed first, score column indicates score after each Neto goal

List of international goals scored by Pedro Neto
No.	Date	Cap	Venue	Opponent	Score	Result	Competition
1	11 November 2020	1	Estádio da Luz, Lisbon, Portugal	Andorra	1–0	7–0	Friendly
2	15 November 2024	14	Estádio do Dragão, Porto, Portugal	Poland	4–0	5–1	2024–25 UEFA Nations League A
3	10 June 2026	25	Estádio Dr. Magalhães Pessoa, Leiria, Portugal	Nigeria	1–0	2–1	Friendly
4	17 November 2026	35	Cardiff City Stadium, Cardiff, Wales	Wales	2–2	3–2	2026–27 UEFA Nations League A

== Honours ==
Lazio

- Coppa Italia: 2018–19

Chelsea

- UEFA Conference League: 2024–25
- FIFA Club World Cup: 2025
- FA Cup runner-up: 2025–26

Portugal

- UEFA Nations League: 2024–25

Individual

- Wolverhampton Wanderers Player of the Year: 2020–21
- Wolverhampton Wanderers Players' Player of the Season: 2020–21
- Wolverhampton Wanders Young Player of the Season: 2019–20
- Chelsea Goal of the Season: 2024–25
- FIFA Club World Cup Team of the Tournament: 2025
