= Confederação do Desporto de Portugal =

The Confederação do Desporto de Portugal (Sport Confederation of Portugal) is a multi-sports confederation in Portugal. Each year this Institute promotes the Sports by awarding the athletes had better performances in that year.
