= Hugo Bueno (footballer, born 2002) =

Spanish footballer

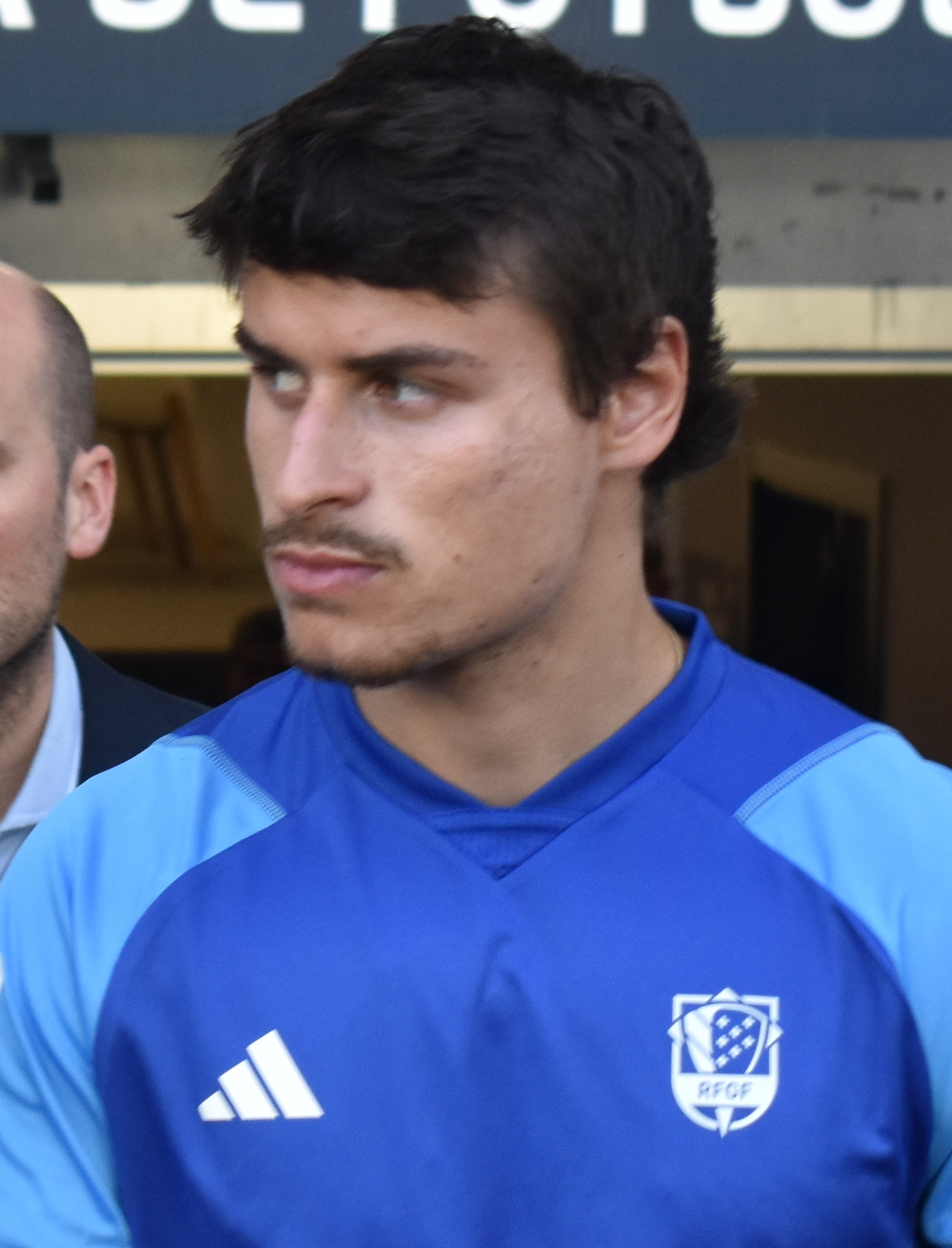
- Bueno with Galicia in 2024

Personal information
- Full name: Hugo Bueno Lopez
- Date of birth: 18 September 2002 (age 24)
- Place of birth: Vigo, Spain
- Height: 1.80 m (5 ft 11 in)
- Positions: Left-back; left wing-back

Team information
- Current team: Wolverhampton Wanderers
- Number: 3

Youth career
- –2019: CD Areosa
- 2019–2022: Wolverhampton Wanderers

Senior career*
Years	Team	Apps	(Gls)
2022–	Wolverhampton Wanderers	78	(1)
2024–2025	→ Feyenoord (loan)	20	(0)

International career^{‡}
2020	Spain U18	1	(0)
2023–2025	Spain U21	8	(0)
2024	Galicia	1	(0)
- * Club domestic league appearances and goals as of 23:41, 24 May 2026 (UTC) ‡ National team caps and goals as of 23:57, 21 June 2025 (UTC)

Hugo Bueno López (born 18 September 2002) is a Spanish professional footballer who plays as a left-back or left wing-back for EFL Championship club Wolverhampton Wanderers.

== Club career ==
=== Wolverhampton Wanderers ===
In 2019, Bueno joined the youth academy of English Premier League side Wolverhampton Wanderers from CD Areosa.

Bueno made his Premier League debut on 15 October 2022, as a late substitute in a 1–0 victory over Nottingham Forest at Molineux.

On 20 November 2023, Bueno extended his contract with Wolverhampton Wanderers until 2028.

On 16 March 2024, Bueno scored his first senior career goal for Wolverhampton Wanderers, scoring the Wolves' second goal in a 3–2 loss during an FA Cup quarter-final tie against Coventry City.

==== Feyenoord (loan) ====
On 13 August 2024, Dutch club Feyenoord announced that it had signed Bueno on loan for the remainder of the season. Bueno made his debut for the club on 18 August, providing the assist for the first goal in a 5–1 away win against PEC Zwolle.

For the first time since 1993-94 UEFA Champions League, Feyenoord qualified for the round of 16 of the UEFA Champions League thanks to a 1–1 draw against Milan at Stadio Giuseppe Meazza. A quality cross by Hugo from the left flank became the assist of Feyenoord's qualifying goal in that match.

==== Return to Wolves ====
On 18 February 2026, Bueno scored his first Premier League goal in Wolves' 2–2 draw to Arsenal.

== International career ==
On 26 February 2020, Bueno made his international debut at under-18's level for Spain in a 2–1 win against Denmark international friendly.

He debuted for Galicia on 31 May 2024 during a 2–0 loss against Panama.

== Personal life ==
He has an identical twin brother named Guille Bueno, who plays for Real Valladolid.

== Career statistics ==
As of match played 24 May 2026

Appearances and goals by club, season and competition
Club	Season	League			National cup (Note: Includes FA Cup, KNVB Cup)		League cup (Note: Includes EFL Cup)		Europe		Other		Total	
Club	Season	Division	Apps	Goals	Apps	Goals	Apps	Goals	Apps	Goals	Apps	Goals	Apps	Goals
Wolverhampton Wanderers U23	2020–21	—			—		—		—		4 (Note: Appearance(s) in EFL Trophy)	0	4	0
Wolverhampton Wanderers U23	2021–22	—			—		—		—		1	0	1	0
Wolverhampton Wanderers U23	2022–23	—			—		—		—		2	0	2	0
Wolverhampton Wanderers U23	Total		—		—		—		—		7	0	7	0
Wolverhampton Wanderers	2022–23	Premier League	21	0	1	0	1	0	—		—		23	0
Wolverhampton Wanderers	2023–24	Premier League	22	0	2	1	2	0	—		—		26	1
Wolverhampton Wanderers	2025–26	Premier League	35	1	1	0	2	0	—		—		38	1
Wolverhampton Wanderers	Total		78	1	4	1	5	0	—		—		87	2
Feyenoord (loan)	2024–25	Eredivisie	20	0	1	0	—		9 (Note: Appearances in UEFA Champions League)	0	—		30	0
Career total			98	1	5	1	5	0	9	0	7	0	124	2
