= Andreas Søndergaard =

Danish goalkeeper (born 2001)

Personal information
- Date of birth: 17 January 2001 (age 25)
- Place of birth: Nyborg, Denmark
- Height: 1.88 m (6 ft 2 in)
- Position: Goalkeeper

Team information
- Current team: Hobro
- Number: 1

Youth career
- –2018: OB
- 2018–2021: Wolverhampton Wanderers

Senior career*
Years	Team	Apps	(Gls)
2021–2023	Wolverhampton Wanderers	0	(0)
2021	→ Randers (loan)	0	(0)
2022	→ Hereford (loan)	4	(0)
2023	Swansea City	0	(0)
2023	Vestri	0	(0)
2024–	Hobro	20	(0)

International career
2016–2017	Denmark U16	6	(0)
2017–2018	Denmark U17	11	(0)
2018–2019	Denmark U18	3	(0)
2019	Denmark U19	1	(0)
- * Club domestic league appearances and goals as of 29 May 2025

Andreas Søndergaard (born 17 January 2001) is a Danish professional footballer who plays as a goalkeeper for Danish 1st Division side Hobro IK.

== Career ==
Søndergaard started his career with English Premier League side Wolves after receiving interest from Milan in the Italian Serie A. In 2021, he was sent on loan to Danish top flight club Randers. On 27 October 2021, Søndergaard debuted for Randers during a 4–0 win over Middelfart. Before the second half of 2021–22, Søndergaard was sent on loan to Hereford in the English sixth tier.

On 31 January 2023, Søndergaard left Wolves by mutual concent.

On 17 February 2023, Søndergaard joined Swansea City on a short-term deal.

In October 2023, Søndergaard joined Icelandic Besta deild karla club Vestri. Søndergaard never got to play for Vestri before signing a 3-year contract with Danish 1st Division side Hobro IK in late January.
