= 2026–27 Wolverhampton Wanderers F.C. season =

English football club season

Wolverhampton Wanderers
2026–27 season
- Owner: Fosun International
- Executive chairman: Nathan Shi
- Head coach: César Peixoto
- Stadium: Molineux Stadium
- Championship: 3rd
- FA Cup: Third round
- EFL Cup: Third round
- Top goalscorer: League: Fer López (6); All: Fer López (7)
Home colours	Away colours	Third colours

The 2026–27 season is the 149th season in the history of Wolverhampton Wanderers Football Club, and their first season back being in the Championship since 2017–18 season following relegation from the Premier League in the preceding season. In addition to the domestic league, the club also participate in the FA Cup and the EFL Cup.

== Managerial changes ==
Prior to the season starting, the club parted ways with head coach Rob Edwards. Four days later, César Peixoto was appointed as the new head coach on a two-year contract.

== Transfers and contracts ==
=== In ===
Date	Pos.	Player	From	Fee	Ref.
First team
15 June 2026 (Note: The transfer was announced on 6 June, and would become official on June 15 once the transfer window opened.)	CB	(Czech Republic) Ladislav Krejčí	(Spain) Girona	£20,000,000	
1 July 2026 (Note: The transfer was announced on 9 June, and would become official on July 1 once Jiménez's contract at Fulham had expired.)	CF	(Mexico) Raúl Jiménez	(England) Fulham	Free	
1 July 2026 (Note: The transfer was announced on 8 June, and would become official on July 1 once Trippier's contract at Newcastle United had expired.)	RB	(England) Kieran Trippier	(England) Newcastle United	Free	
11 July 2026	LW	(Comoros) Rafiki Saïd	(Belgium) Standard Liège	£7,700,000	
27 August 2026	GK	(England) John Ruddy	(England) Newcastle United	Free	
27 August 2026	GK	(Portugal) João Virgínia	(Portugal) Sporting CP	£1,300,000	
2 September 2026	LB	(Ivory Coast) Ghislain Konan	(Portugal) Gil Vicente	Free	
7 September 2026	RW	(Burkina Faso) Bertrand Traoré	(England) Sunderland	Free	
Academy
13 August 2026	GK	(England) Adam Harrison	(England) Newcastle United	Free	
14 August 2026	CM	(Democratic Republic of the Congo) Julian Garate	(England) Reading	Free	
14 August 2026	CF	(England) Tejay Smith	(England) AFC Fylde	Free	

=== Loaned in ===
Date	Pos.	Player	From	Loaned until	Ref.
First team
19 August 2026	CM	(Wales) Jordan James	(France) Rennes	End of Season (Note: Obligation to make the move permanent should certain criteria be met)	
2 September 2026	CF	(England) Sean Neave	(England) Newcastle United	End of Season	
Academy

=== Loaned out ===
Date	Pos.	Player	To	Loaned until	Ref.
First team
29 July 2026	CF	(Nigeria) Tolu Arokodare	(Netherlands) Ajax	End of Season (Note: Option to sign permanently at the conclusion of the loan deal)	
1 September 2026	CF	(South Korea) Hwang Hee-chan	(Germany) Schalke 04	End of Season	
1 September 2026	LB	(Norway) David Møller Wolfe	(Germany) Hamburg	End of Season	
2 September 2026	GK	(England) Sam Johnstone	(Scotland) Celtic	End of Season	
11 September 2026	CB	(Uruguay) Santiago Bueno	(Mexico) América	End of Season	
12 September 2026	RB	(Brazil) Pedro Lima	(Brazil) São Paulo	End of Season	
Academy
31 July 2026	CF	(England) Leon Chiwome	(England) Colchester United	End of Season	
6 August 2026	GK	(Wales) Lewys Benjamin	(England) Telford United	End of Season	
10 August 2026	LB	(Scotland) Ethan Sutherland	(England) Exeter City	End of Season	
15 August 2026	GK	(England) Adam Harrison	(England) Malvern Town	12 September 2026	
24 August 2026	CAM	(England) Conor McLeod	(Scotland) Falkirk	End of Season	

=== Out ===
Date	Pos.	Player	To	Fee	Ref.
First team
20 July 2026	CM	(Brazil) João Gomes	(England) Aston Villa	£38,000,000 (Note: A potential further £4,000,000 in add-ons)	
24 July 2026	CB	(Netherlands) Nigel Lonwijk	(Israel) Maccabi Haifa	£500,000 (Note: Includes a 25% sell-on clause)	
21 August 2026	GK	(England) Daniel Bentley	(England) Coventry City	Free transfer	
25 August 2026	RB	(Netherlands) Ki-Jana Hoever	(Czech Republic) Sparta Prague	Undisclosed	
30 August 2026	CF	(Austria) Saša Kalajdžić	(Austria) LASK	Free transfer	
Academy
26 June 2026	GK	(Republic of Ireland) James Storer	(England) Plymouth Argyle	Free transfer	
6 July 2026	CB	(England) Alfie Pond	(England) Chesterfield	Undisclosed	
4 September 2026	GK	(Republic of Ireland) Xander Grieves	(England) Southampton	Undisclosed	

=== Released / Out of contract ===
Date	Pos.	Player	Subsequent club	Joined date	Ref.
First team
30 June 2026	RB	(Republic of Ireland) Matt Doherty	(England) Sheffield United	20 July 2026	
Academy
30 June 2026	GK	(England) Arthur Nasta	(England) Hornchurch	1 July 2026	
30 June 2026	CF	(England) Fabian Salmon	(England) Worcester City	6 August 2026	
30 June 2026	CAM	(England) Ty Barnett	(United States) Crown Legacy FC	3 September 2026	
30 June 2026	LWB	(Austria) David Osifo	(Austria) LASK Amateure OÖ	24 September 2026	
30 June 2026	CDM	(England) Harvey Griffiths	(England) Worthing	17 October 2026	
30 June 2026	RB	(Jamaica) Dexter Lembikisa			
30 June 2026	CAM	(Norway) Bjørn Marwa			
30 June 2026	CF	(England) Jake Wilcox			

=== New contract ===
Date	Pos.	Player	Expiration	Ref.
First team
22 May 2026	CDM	(Brazil) André	30 June 2030	
4 September 2026	GK	(Portugal) José Sá	30 June 2028	
Academy
15 July 2026	CB	(Wales) Ashton Williams	30 June 2028 (Note: First professional contract)	
24 August 2026	CAM	(England) Conor McLeod	30 June 2027	
22 September 2026	CDM	(England) Jerome Abbey	Undisclosed	

== Pre-season and friendlies ==
On 3 June, Wolves announced two pre-season friendlies against Maidenhead United and Heerenveen. Six days later, a fixture versus Real Sociedad was added. On 24 June, a visit to Doncaster Rovers was added to the schedule. On 2 July, a home fixture against Racing Santander was announced to replace the cancelled fixture versus Heerenveen.

Win Draw Loss Fixtures

18 July 2026 Friendly	Estoril Praia	0–0	Wolverhampton Wanderers	Ferreiras, Portugal
18:00 WEST		Report		Stadium: Estádio da Nora; Attendance: 0 (BCD)

22 July 2026 Friendly	Maidenhead United	0–1	Wolverhampton Wanderers	Maidenhead
19:30 BST		Report	Mané 59'	Stadium: York Road
Note: Fixture was initially scheduled for 21 July, but was pushed back a day.

25 July 2026 Friendly	Wolverhampton Wanderers	1–2	Real Sociedad	Bescot
17:00 BST	Gomes 17'	Report	Óskarsson 34'; Lebarbier 83'	Stadium: Pallet-Track Bescot Stadium

29 July 2026 Friendly	Doncaster Rovers	0–2	Wolverhampton Wanderers	Doncaster
19:30 BST		Report	López 81'; Chirewa 85'	Stadium: Eco-Power Stadium

1 August 2026 Friendly	Heerenveen	Cancelled	Wolverhampton Wanderers	Heerenveen, Netherlands
15:00 CEST				Stadium: Abe Lenstra Stadion
Note: Fixture was cancelled due to travel arrangements which would have been required for travelling supporters.

1 August 2026 Friendly	Wolverhampton Wanderers	0–1	Racing Santander	Compton
11:00 BST		Report		Stadium: Sir Jack Hayward Training Ground; Attendance: 0 (BCD)

1 August 2026 Friendly	Wolverhampton Wanderers	3–0	Racing Santander	Wolverhampton
17:00 BST	López 18'; Bueno 76'; Mosquera 79'	Report		Stadium: Molineux

== Competitions ==
=== Overall record ===
Competition	First match	Last match	Starting round	Record							
Competition	First match	Last match	Starting round	Pld	W	D	L	GF	GA	GD	Win %
EFL Championship	14 August 2026	1 May 2027	Matchday 1	16	9	4	3	28	19	+9	56.25
FA Cup	6–9 January 2027	TBD	Third round	0	0	0	0	0	0	+0	—
EFL Cup	8 August 2026	TBD	First round	1	1	0	0	3	0	+3	100.00
Total				17	10	4	3	31	19	+12	58.82

Last updated: 21 November 2026
Source: Soccerway

=== Championship ===
==== League table ====
Pos	Team	Pld	W	D	L	GF	GA	GD	Pts	Promotion, qualification or relegation
1	Middlesbrough	16	9	5	2	32	19	+13	32	Promotion to the Premier League
2	Stoke City	16	10	2	4	25	18	+7	32	Promotion to the Premier League
3	Wolverhampton Wanderers	16	9	4	3	28	19	+9	31	Qualification for Championship play-off semi-finals
4	Birmingham City	16	8	5	3	28	15	+13	29	Qualification for Championship play-off semi-finals
5	West Bromwich Albion	16	8	5	3	25	17	+8	29	Qualification for Championship play-off quarter-finals

Updated to match(es) played on 21 November 2026. Source: EFL Official Website
Rules for classification: 1) Points; 2) Goal difference; 3) Number of goals scored; 4) Head-to-head results; 5) Wins; 6) Away goals; 7) Penalty points (sec 9.5); 8) Number of 12-point sending off offences; 9) Play-off (only if needed to determine promotion/relegation)

==== Results summary ====
Overall								Home						Away					
Pld	W	D	L	GF	GA	GD	Pts	W	D	L	GF	GA	GD	W	D	L	GF	GA	GD
16	9	4	3	28	19	+9	31	5	2	1	15	8	+7	4	2	2	13	11	+2

Last updated: 21 November 2026.
Source: Soccerway

==== Results by round ====
Round	1	2	3	4	5	7	8	9	10	11	6^{1}	12	13	14	15	16	17	18	19	20	21	22	23	24	25	26	27	28	29	30	31	32	33	34	35	36	37	38	39	40	41	42	43	44	45	46
Ground	H	A	H	A	A	A	H	A	H	A	H	H	H	A	A	H	H	A	H	A	H	A	H	A	A	H	A	H	H	A	H	A	A	H	H	A	H	A	A	H	A	H	A	H	H	A
Result	D	W	W	L	D	W	W	L	L	W	D	W	W	W	D	W																														
Position	12	4	2	4	9	7	4	5	10	8	7	4	3	2	4	3																														
Points	1	4	7	7	8	11	14	14	14	17	18	21	24	27	28	31																														

Source: Soccerway
A = Away; H = Home; W = Win; D = Draw; L = Loss
Notes:
- ^{1} Matchday 6 (vs Portsmouth) was rescheduled due to EFL Cup involvements.

==== Matches ====
The Championship fixtures were released on 25 June 2026.

Win Draw Loss Fixtures

14 August 2026 1	Wolverhampton Wanderers	2–2	Blackburn Rovers	Wolverhampton
20:00 BST	Munetsi 18'; Mané (yellow card) 52'; Jiménez 90+3' (pen.)	Report	McLoughlin 27'; Pickering (yellow card) 34'; Cantwell (yellow card) 35'; Forshaw (yellow card) 45'; Guðjohnsen 48'	Stadium: Molineux Stadium; Attendance: 30,984 (2,015 away fans); Referee: Farai Hallam

22 August 2026 2	Preston North End	1–3	Wolverhampton Wanderers	Preston
15:00 BST	Hughes (yellow card) 14'; McCann (yellow card) 50'; Leroy (yellow card) 55'; Clarke (yellow card) 90'; Thompson 90+1'	Report	López 8', 82'; Munetsi (yellow card) 43'; Armstrong 71'	Stadium: Deepdale; Attendance: 19,301 (5,719 away fans); Referee: Elliot Bell

29 August 2026 3	Wolverhampton Wanderers	4–1	Stoke City	Wolverhampton
12:30 BST	Gomes 19', 22'; Mané (yellow card) 39'; Jiménez 55'; James 84'	Report	Gallagher 2', (yellow card) 45'; Bae Jun-ho (yellow card) 15'; Lawal (yellow card) 31'; Thomas (yellow card) 90+3'	Stadium: Molineux Stadium; Attendance: 30,334 (2,557 away fans); Referee: Tom Nield
Note: Fixture was initially scheduled for a 15:00 kick-off, but was moved for live Sky Sports broadcast.

1 September 2026 4	West Ham United	4–2	Wolverhampton Wanderers	Stratford
19:45 BST	Mukasa 33', 53', (yellow card) 45'; Bowen 42' (pen.); Mavropanos 64'; Castellanos (yellow card) 90'	Report	Munetsi 44'; Mavropanos 69' (o.g.); James (yellow card) 87'	Stadium: London Stadium; Attendance: 59,113 (2,941 away fans); Referee: Lewis Smith

6 September 2026 5	Birmingham City	2–2	Wolverhampton Wanderers	Birmingham
12:00 BST	Stansfield 22'; Tchatchoua 36' (o.g.); Klarer (yellow card) 53'; Neumann (yellow card) 67'	Report	López 3'; Krejčí 31'; Munetsi (yellow card) 51'	Stadium: St Andrew's; Attendance: 27,503 (1,945 away fans); Referee: Adam Herczeg
Note: Fixture was initially scheduled for 5 September, but was moved for live Sky Sports broadcast.

13 September 2026 7	Sheffield United	0–1	Wolverhampton Wanderers	Sheffield
12:00 BST	McCallum (yellow card) 2'; Tanganga (yellow card) 48'	Report	Krejčí (yellow card) 17'; Jiménez 90'	Stadium: Bramall Lane; Attendance: 26,244 (2,800 away fans); Referee: Robert Jones
Note: Fixture was initially scheduled for 12 September, but was moved for live Sky Sports broadcast.

20 September 2026 8	Wolverhampton Wanderers	1–0	West Bromwich Albion	Wolverhampton
12:00 BST	López 50'; Munetsi (yellow card) 69'	Report	Molumby (yellow card) 25'; Phillips (yellow card) 44'	Stadium: Molineux Stadium; Attendance: 30,892 (2,550 away fans); Referee: Josh Smith
Note: Fixture was initially scheduled for 19 September, but was moved for live Sky Sports broadcast.

10 October 2026 9	Middlesbrough	1–0	Wolverhampton Wanderers	Middlesbrough
15:00 BST	Berhalter (yellow card) 11'; Borges (yellow card) 40'; Lankshear 57'; Peart-Harris (yellow card) 90+4'	Report	Djiga (yellow card) 12'; Saïd (yellow card) 53'; Bellegarde (yellow card) 66'	Stadium: Riverside Stadium; Attendance: 32,125 (2,058 away fans); Referee: Farai Hallam

13 October 2026 10	Wolverhampton Wanderers	1–3	Bolton Wanderers	Wolverhampton
19:45 BST	Mané (yellow card) 26'; Bellegarde 50'; Trippier (yellow card) 89'; Neave (yellow card) 90+3'	Report	Itō 28'; Larrazabal (yellow card) 45+1'; Dalby 72'; Erhahon (yellow card) 76'; Sheehan 82'	Stadium: Molineux Stadium; Attendance: 28,730 (2,496 away fans); Referee: Tim Robinson

16 October 2026 11	Burnley	1–2	Wolverhampton Wanderers	Burnley
20:00 BST	Vardy 20'; Hatate (yellow card) 63'; Walker (yellow card) 90'	Report	López 39'; Neave (yellow card) 70'; Chirewa 72'	Stadium: Turf Moor; Attendance: 19,655 (1,942 away fans); Referee: Lewis Smith
Note: Fixture was initially scheduled for 17 October, but was brought forward to the night prior for live Sky Sports broadcasting.

20 October 2026 6	Wolverhampton Wanderers	1–1	Portsmouth	Wolverhampton
19:45 BST	Neave (yellow card) 22'; James 62'; Bellegarde (yellow card) 83'; Doyle (yellow card) 84'	Report	Mohamed (yellow card) 55'; Milovanović (yellow card) 80'; Devlin 86'; Kavuma-McQueen (yellow card) 90+5'	Stadium: Molineux Stadium; Attendance: 29,058 (1,976 away fans); Referee: Edward Duckworth
Note: Fixture was initially scheduled for 8 September, but was moved due to the Birmingham fixture being played on the preceding Sunday. It was then pushed back a week due to EFL Cup involvements. It was then rearranged again to late-October.

24 October 2026 12	Wolverhampton Wanderers	1–0	Watford	Wolverhampton
15:00 BST	Armstrong 35'; Trippier (yellow card) 41'; Doyle (yellow card) 79'; Bueno (yellow card) 87'; Sá (yellow card) 88'	Report	Bravo (yellow card) 41'; Kyprianou (yellow card) 49'; Zemura (yellow card) 74'	Stadium: Molineux Stadium; Attendance: 29,973 (1,730 away fans); Referee: Robert Madley

31 October 2026 13	Wolverhampton Wanderers	3–0	Cardiff City	Wolverhampton
15:00 GMT	López 10', (yellow card) 50'; Armstrong 15', (yellow card) 26'; André (yellow card) 41'; Krejčí 58'; Bellegarde (yellow card) 62'	Report	Bagan (yellow card) 50'; Colwill (yellow card) 90+2'	Stadium: Molineux Stadium; Attendance: 29,852 (2,557 away fans); Referee: Josh Smith

4 November 2026 14	Bristol City	1–2	Wolverhampton Wanderers	Bristol
20:00 GMT	Twine 34'; Pring (yellow card) 65'; McNally (yellow card) 88'	Report	Bellegarde (yellow card) 65'; Neave 82', 89'	Stadium: Ashton Gate; Attendance: 23,569 (1,989 away fans); Referee: Tom Nield
Note: Fixture was initially scheduled for a 19:45 kick-off, but was pushed back for live Sky Sports broadcasting.

7 November 2026 15	Wrexham	1–1	Wolverhampton Wanderers	Wrexham
12:30 GMT	O'Brien 27'; Ekomié (yellow card) 54'; James (yellow card) 86'	Report	Armstrong 25'; Gomes (yellow card) 30'; André (yellow card) 61'	Stadium: Racecourse Ground; Attendance: 10,631 (1,293 away fans); Referee: Andrew Kitchen
Note: Fixture was initially scheduled for a 15:00 kick-off, but was brought forward for live Sky Sports broadcasting.

21 November 2026 16	Wolverhampton Wanderers	2–1	Charlton Athletic	Wolverhampton
15:00 GMT	Armstrong 51'; Saïd 54'; Mané (yellow card) 64'; Bueno (yellow card) 90+2'	Report	Skipp (yellow card) 79'; Godden 82'; Coventry (yellow card) 89'	Stadium: Molineux Stadium; Attendance: 29,523 (2,006 away fans); Referee: Simon Hooper

24 November 2026 17	Wolverhampton Wanderers	v	Derby County	Wolverhampton
20:00 GMT		Report		Stadium: Molineux Stadium
Note: Fixture was initially scheduled for a 19:45 kick-off, but was pushed back for live Sky Sports broadcasting.

28 November 2026 18	Lincoln City	v	Wolverhampton Wanderers	Lincoln
12:30 GMT		Report		Stadium: Sincil Bank
Note: Fixture was initially scheduled for a 15:00 kick-off, but was brought forward for live Sky Sports broadcasting.

5 December 2026 19	Wolverhampton Wanderers	v	Southampton	Wolverhampton
15:00 GMT		Report		Stadium: Molineux Stadium

8 December 2026 20	Queens Park Rangers	v	Wolverhampton Wanderers	Shepherd's Bush
19:45 GMT		Report		Stadium: Loftus Road

12 December 2026 21	Wolverhampton Wanderers	v	Millwall	Wolverhampton
15:00 GMT		Report		Stadium: Molineux Stadium

19 December 2026 22	Norwich City	v	Wolverhampton Wanderers	Norwich
15:00 GMT		Report		Stadium: Carrow Road

26 December 2026 23	Wolverhampton Wanderers	v	Swansea City	Wolverhampton
15:00 GMT		Report		Stadium: Molineux Stadium

29 December 2026 24	Watford	v	Wolverhampton Wanderers	Watford
19:45 GMT		Report		Stadium: Vicarage Road

1 January 2027 25	Millwall	v	Wolverhampton Wanderers	Bermondsey
12:30 GMT		Report		Stadium: The Den
Note: Fixture was initially scheduled for a 15:00 kick-off, but was brought forward for live Sky Sports broadcasting.

16 January 2027 26	Wolverhampton Wanderers	v	Burnley	Wolverhampton
12:30 GMT		Report		Stadium: Molineux Stadium
Note: Fixture was initially scheduled for a 15:00 kick-off, but was brought forward for live Sky Sports broadcasting.

23 January 2027 27	Cardiff City	v	Wolverhampton Wanderers	Cardiff
15:00 GMT		Report		Stadium: Cardiff City Stadium
Note: Fixture was initially scheduled for 23 January, but was pushed back a day for live Sky Sports broadcasting.

27 January 2027 28	Wolverhampton Wanderers	v	Bristol City	Wolverhampton
19:45 GMT		Report		Stadium: Molineux Stadium

30 January 2027 29	Wolverhampton Wanderers	v	Wrexham	Wolverhampton
12:30 GMT		Report		Stadium: Molineux Stadium
Note: Fixture was initially scheduled for a 15:00 kick-off, but was brought forward for live Sky Sports broadcasting.

6 February 2027 30	Charlton Athletic	v	Wolverhampton Wanderers	Charlton
12:30 GMT		Report		Stadium: The Valley
Note: Fixture was initially scheduled for a 15:00 kick-off, but was brought forward for live Sky Sports broadcasting.

13 February 2027 31	Wolverhampton Wanderers	v	Sheffield United	Wolverhampton
15:00 GMT		Report		Stadium: Molineux Stadium

17 February 2027 32	Bolton Wanderers	v	Wolverhampton Wanderers	Bolton
19:45 GMT		Report		Stadium: Toughsheet Community Stadium

20 February 2027 33	West Bromwich Albion	v	Wolverhampton Wanderers	West Bromwich
12:30 GMT		Report		Stadium: The Hawthorns
Note: Fixture was initially scheduled for a 15:00 kick-off, but was brought forward for live Sky Sports broadcasting.

27 February 2027 34	Wolverhampton Wanderers	v	Middlesbrough	Wolverhampton
15:00 GMT		Report		Stadium: Molineux Stadium

3 March 2027 35	Wolverhampton Wanderers	v	Preston North End	Wolverhampton
19:45 GMT		Report		Stadium: Molineux Stadium

6 March 2027 36	Blackburn Rovers	v	Wolverhampton Wanderers	Blackburn
15:00 GMT		Report		Stadium: Ewood Park

13 March 2027 37	Wolverhampton Wanderers	v	Lincoln City	Wolverhampton
15:00 GMT		Report		Stadium: Molineux Stadium

16 March 2027 38	Southampton	v	Wolverhampton Wanderers	Southampton
19:45 GMT		Report		Stadium: St Mary's Stadium

20 March 2027 39	Swansea City	v	Wolverhampton Wanderers	Swansea
15:00 GMT		Report		Stadium: Swansea.com Stadium

3 April 2027 40	Wolverhampton Wanderers	v	Norwich City	Wolverhampton
15:00 BST		Report		Stadium: Molineux Stadium

6 April 2027 41	Portsmouth	v	Wolverhampton Wanderers	Portsmouth
19:45 BST		Report		Stadium: Fratton Park

10 April 2027 42	Wolverhampton Wanderers	v	Birmingham City	Wolverhampton
15:00 BST		Report		Stadium: Molineux Stadium

17 April 2027 43	Stoke City	v	Wolverhampton Wanderers	Stoke-on-Trent
15:00 BST		Report		Stadium: Bet365 Stadium

20 April 2027 44	Wolverhampton Wanderers	v	West Ham United	Wolverhampton
19:45 BST		Report		Stadium: Molineux Stadium

24 April 2027 45	Wolverhampton Wanderers	v	Queens Park Rangers	Wolverhampton
15:00 BST		Report		Stadium: Molineux Stadium

1 May 2027 46	Derby County	v	Wolverhampton Wanderers	Derby
12:30 BST		Report		Stadium: Pride Park Stadium

=== FA Cup ===
Win Draw Loss Fixtures

=== EFL Cup ===
Wolves were drawn at home to Port Vale in the first round, then away to Sheffield Wednesday in the second round and Everton in the third round.

Win Draw Loss Fixtures

7 August 2026 First round	Wolverhampton Wanderers	3–0	Port Vale	Wolverhampton
19:45 BST	Armstrong 14'; André 34'; López 43'; Trippier (yellow card) 64'	Report	Lawrence-Gabriel (yellow card) 26'; Faal (penalty missed) 56'	Stadium: Molineux Stadium; Attendance: 21,360 (2,533 away fans); Referee: David Webb

25 August 2026 Second round	Sheffield Wednesday	0–2	Wolverhampton Wanderers	Sheffield
19:45 BST	Thornton (yellow card) 8'	Report	Swinkels 3' (o.g.); Traoré (yellow card) 32'; Olagunju 45+1'	Stadium: Hillsborough Stadium; Attendance: 13,586 (2,400 away fans); Referee: Ben Speedie

16 September 2026 Third round	Everton	1–0	Wolverhampton Wanderers	Vauxhall
19:45 BST	Grealish (yellow card) 11'; Alcaraz 80'	Report	Tchatchoua (yellow card) 10'; Doyle (yellow card) 90+1'	Stadium: Hill Dickinson Stadium; Attendance: 50,970 (3,000 away fans); Referee: Thomas Bramall
Note: Fixture was initially scheduled for 9 September, but was pushed back a week due to Liverpool being at home in the UEFA Champions League against Atlético Madrid.

== Statistics ==
=== Appearances and goals ===
As of match played 21 November 2026

Players with no appearances are not included on the list, italics indicate a loaned in player.

No.	Pos	Nat	Player	Total		Championship		FA Cup		EFL Cup	
No.	Pos	Nat	Player	Apps	Goals	Apps	Goals	Apps	Goals	Apps	Goals
1	GK	(Portugal) POR	José Sá	16	0	15+0	0	0+0	0	1+0	0
2	DF	(England) ENG	Kieran Trippier	11	0	8+1	0	0+0	0	1+1	0
3	DF	(Spain) ESP	Hugo Bueno	17	0	13+2	0	0+0	0	1+1	0
5	MF	(Zimbabwe) ZIM	Marshall Munetsi	18	2	14+2	2	0+0	0	1+1	0
7	MF	(Brazil) BRA	André	17	1	16+0	0	0+0	0	1+0	1
8	MF	(Wales) WAL	Jordan James	14	2	3+9	2	0+0	0	2+0	0
9	FW	(Mexico) MEX	Raúl Jiménez	9	3	4+2	3	0+0	0	1+2	0
10	FW	(England) ENG	Adam Armstrong	17	6	11+3	5	0+0	0	2+1	1
11	FW	(Burkina Faso) BFA	Bertrand Traoré	2	0	0+1	0	0+0	0	0+1	0
12	MF	(Mali) MLI	Boubacar Traoré	6	0	0+4	0	0+0	0	2+0	0
13	GK	(Portugal) POR	João Virgínia	1	0	0+0	0	0+0	0	1+0	0
14	FW	(England) ENG	Sean Neave	11	2	2+8	2	0+0	0	1+0	0
15	MF	(Colombia) COL	Yerson Mosquera	7	0	5+1	0	0+0	0	1+0	0
19	FW	(Comoros) COM	Rafiki Saïd	9	1	6+3	1	0+0	0	0+0	0
20	MF	(England) ENG	Tommy Doyle	18	0	2+13	0	0+0	0	2+1	0
21	DF	(Portugal) POR	Rodrigo Gomes	13	2	9+2	2	0+0	0	2+0	0
23	FW	(Zimbabwe) ZIM	Tawanda Chirewa	11	1	0+9	1	0+0	0	2+0	0
24	DF	(Portugal) POR	Toti	13	0	8+2	0	0+0	0	2+1	0
27	MF	(Haiti) HAI	Jean-Ricner Bellegarde	10	1	4+5	1	0+0	0	0+1	0
28	MF	(Spain) ESP	Fer López	17	7	14+1	6	0+0	0	1+1	1
33	DF	(Ivory Coast) CIV	Ghislain Konan	3	0	1+1	0	0+0	0	1+0	0
34	DF	(Burkina Faso) BFA	Nasser Djiga	14	0	11+0	0	0+0	0	1+2	0
36	MF	(Portugal) POR	Mateus Mané	18	0	11+5	0	0+0	0	1+1	0
37	DF	(Czech Republic) CZE	Ladislav Krejčí	12	2	9+1	2	0+0	0	1+1	0
38	FW	(Cameroon) CMR	Jackson Tchatchoua	11	0	8+1	0	0+0	0	1+1	0
59	DF	(England) ENG	Saheed Olagunju	1	1	0+0	0	0+0	0	1+0	1
Players who featured but departed the club permanently during the season:
6	DF	(Norway) NOR	David Møller Wolfe	3	0	1+1	0	0+0	0	1+0	0
17	DF	(Brazil) BRA	Pedro Lima	2	0	0+1	0	0+0	0	1+0	0
25	GK	(England) ENG	Daniel Bentley	2	0	1+0	0	0+0	0	1+0	0

=== Disciplinary record ===
As of match played 21 November 2026

Rank	No.	Pos.	Player	Championship			FA Cup			EFL Cup			Total		
Rank	No.	Pos.	Player	Yellow card	(yellow card) (yellow-red card)	Red card	Yellow card	(yellow card) (yellow-red card)	Red card	Yellow card	(yellow card) (yellow-red card)	Red card	Yellow card	(yellow card) (yellow-red card)	Red card
1	27	CM	(Haiti) Jean-Ricner Bellegarde	4	0	0	0	0	0	0	0	0	4	0	0
1	36	CAM	(Portugal) Mateus Mané	4	0	0	0	0	0	0	0	0	4	0	0
3	2	RB	(England) Kieran Trippier	2	0	0	0	0	0	1	0	0	3	0	0
3	5	CM	(Zimbabwe) Marshall Munetsi	3	0	0	0	0	0	0	0	0	3	0	0
3	14	CF	(England) Sean Neave	3	0	0	0	0	0	0	0	0	3	0	0
3	20	CM	(England) Tommy Doyle	2	0	0	0	0	0	1	0	0	3	0	0
7	3	LB	(Spain) Hugo Bueno	2	0	0	0	0	0	0	0	0	2	0	0
7	7	CDM	(Brazil) André	2	0	0	0	0	0	0	0	0	2	0	0
9	1	GK	(Portugal) José Sá	1	0	0	0	0	0	0	0	0	1	0	0
9	8	CM	(Wales) Jordan James	1	0	0	0	0	0	0	0	0	1	0	0
9	10	CF	(England) Adam Armstrong	1	0	0	0	0	0	0	0	0	1	0	0
9	12	CDM	(Mali) Boubacar Traoré	0	0	0	0	0	0	1	0	0	1	0	0
9	19	LW	(Comoros) Rafiki Saïd	1	0	0	0	0	0	0	0	0	1	0	0
9	24	CB	(Portugal) Toti	1	0	0	0	0	0	0	0	0	1	0	0
9	28	CAM	(Spain) Fer López	1	0	0	0	0	0	0	0	0	1	0	0
9	34	CB	(Burkina Faso) Nasser Djiga	1	0	0	0	0	0	0	0	0	1	0	0
9	37	CB	(Czech Republic) Ladislav Krejčí	1	0	0	0	0	0	0	0	0	1	0	0
9	38	RB	(Cameroon) Jackson Tchatchoua	0	0	0	0	0	0	1	0	0	1	0	0
Total				30	0	0	0	0	0	4	0	0	34	0	0

== Awards ==
=== EFL awards ===
==== EFL Championship Manager of the Month ====
Month	Manager		Ref.
August	(Portugal) César Peixoto	Nominee	

==== EFL Championship Player of the Month ====
Month	Player		Ref.
August	(Spain) Fer López	Nominee	
