= Wolverhampton Wanderers F.C. Development Squad and Academy =

UK association football club

Wolverhampton Wanderers Under-23s (or the Development squad) is a football team that competes in Division 2 of the newly created Premier League 2. The club qualify as an entrant in the competition, by virtue of their academy holding Category 1 status. Although the league is designed for players aged 23 and below, three overage players may also feature.

The team is currently under the management of Richard Walker and home games are primarily staged at Kidderminster Harriers' Aggborough home, though the team also plays games at Molineux. The team has been a pathway into Wolves' first team for the past two seasons, with the likes of current first-team players Hugo Bueno and Mateus Mané progressing from the U23 side.

== Development squad and U23s ==
Note: Flags indicate national team as defined under FIFA eligibility rules; some limited exceptions apply. Players may hold more than one non-FIFA nationality.

No.	Pos.	Nation	Player
40	GK	ENG	Alfie Brooks
50	MF	ENG	Jerome Abbey
54	FW	ESP	Dani Ángel
55	MF	ENG	Alfie White
56	MF	WAL	Makenzie Bradbury
57	DF	ITA	Temple Ojinnaka
59	DF	ENG	Saheed Olagunju
62	MF	JPN	Luke Rawlings
63	FW	KOR	Minkyu Ji

No.	Pos.	Nation	Player
64	MF	ENG	Myles Dayman
70	GK	NIR	Josh Gracey
72	MF	WAL	Finn Ashworth
78	FW	ENG	Emilio Ballard-Matthews
79	DF	SCO	Sebastian Lochhead
—	GK	ENG	Adam Harrison
—	MF	IRL	Luke O'Donnell
—	MF	CHN	Xu Bin

=== Out on loan ===
Note: Flags indicate national team as defined under FIFA eligibility rules; some limited exceptions apply. Players may hold more than one non-FIFA nationality.

No.	Pos.	Nation	Player
44	FW	ENG	Leon Chiwome (at Colchester United until 30 June 2027)
60	DF	SCO	Ethan Sutherland (at Exeter City until 30 June 2027)

No.	Pos.	Nation	Player
—	GK	WAL	Lewys Benjamin (at AFC Telford United until 30 June 2027)
—	MF	ENG	Conor McLeod (at Falkirk until 30 June 2027)

== Academy and Under 18s ==
Wolverhampton Wanderers Academy is a Category 1 status facility and has produced several high-profile graduates including internationals Robbie Keane and Joleon Lescott. Many other players have gone on to play first team football at Molineux, including current first-team player Hugo Bueno.

The current U18 lead coach is Karl Broadhurst and is based at the club's Sir Jack Hayward Training Ground.

All players are correct in accordance to the Wolves Official Website (not including trialists)

Note: Flags indicate national team as defined under FIFA eligibility rules; some limited exceptions apply. Players may hold more than one non-FIFA nationality.

No.	Pos.	Nation	Player
75	GK	ENG	Alfie Arnold
80	MF	ENG	Mason Stevens
81	DF	WAL	Ashton Williams
—	GK	ENG	Dawood Asif
—	DF	ENG	Desmond Ekhosuehi
—	DF	ITA	Elvis Elendu
—	DF	WAL	Leon Huxley
—	DF	ENG	Max Nolan-Ruddock
—	DF	ENG	Elliot Saba
—	DF	ENG	Ollie Stafford
—	MF	ENG	Aaron Aneke
—	MF	ENG	Josiah Djokoto
—	MF	ENG	Hayden Ford
—	MF	COD	Julian Garate

No.	Pos.	Nation	Player
—	MF	ENG	Max Hinks
—	MF	ENG	Shafaat Njuki
—	MF	ENG	Saviour Nkume
—	MF	ENG	Clive Odour
—	MF	ENG	Caden Pugh
—	MF	ENG	Abdul Seidu
—	MF	ENG	Tejay Smith
—	FW	IRL	Dapo Anunlopo
—	FW	ENG	Reiss Bowen
—	FW	ENG	Tyler Coulsen
—	FW	ENG	Ricky Jackson
—	FW	ENG	Junior Mathai
—	FW	ENG	Adrianno Morrison

== Michael Bristow Trophy / Academy Scholar of the Year ==
The Michael Bristow trophy is named after Mike Bristow, a lifelong Wolverhampton Wanderers FC supporter, who died in 2008.

The trophy was donated to Wolverhampton Wanderers FC by Keith Brown.

The trophy is a sterling silver cup, below which are engraved the names of the annual winner, which is decided upon by Wolves and awarded annually to their Academy Scholar of the Year. The trophy is retained in the trophy room at the Molineux.

The presentation is generally made on the pitch in one of the final first team home games of the season, by Keith Brown, Hazel Bristow and Matt Bristow. The winner is given an engraved trophy donated by Keith Brown or Hazel Bristow, to mark their achievement.

Season	Winner
2009	(Republic of Ireland) John Dunleavy
2010	(England) Jamie Reckord
2011	(Northern Ireland) Johnny Gorman
2012	(England) Sam Whittall
2013	(England) Dominic Iorfa
2014	(France) Ibrahim Keita
2015	(England) Regan Upton
2016	(Wales) Ryan Leak
2017	(England) Cameron John
2018	(England) Ryan Giles
2019	(England) Taylor Perry
2020	(Portugal) Christian Marques
2021	(England) Jack Hodnett
2023	(England) Owen Farmer
