= Ethan Sutherland =

Scottish footballer (born 2006)

Personal information
- Date of birth: 25 April 2006 (age 20)
- Place of birth: Scotland
- Height: 1.82 m (6 ft 0 in)
- Positions: Left-back; left wing-back

Team information
- Current team: Exeter City (on loan from Wolverhampton Wanderers)
- Number: 23

Youth career
- –2023: St Mirren

Senior career*
Years	Team	Apps	(Gls)
2023–2024	St Mirren	1	(0)
2024	→ Alloa Athletic (loan)	16	(2)
2024–	Wolverhampton Wanderers	0	(0)
2025–2026	→ Solihull Moors (loan)	5	(0)
2026–	→ Exeter City (loan)	9	(0)

International career^{‡}
2024–	Scotland U19	3	(0)
- * Club domestic league appearances and goals as of 09:24, 12 June 2025 (UTC) ‡ National team caps and goals as of 10:22, 18 February 2025 (UTC)

Ethan Sutherland (born 25 April 2006) is a Scottish professional footballer who plays as a left-back or left wing-back for EFL League Two club Exeter City, on loan from EFL Championship club Wolverhampton Wanderers.

== Club career ==
=== St Mirren ===
Having spent time in the club's academy, Sutherland made his senior debut for St Mirren on 15 July 2023, coming on as a substitute in a 1–0 loss to Montrose in the Scottish League Cup.

In February 2024, he joined Scottish League One side Alloa Athletic on loan until the end of the season.

On 25 August 2024, Sutherland made his professional league debut, coming on as a late substitute in St Mirren's 3–0 loss to Celtic in the Scottish Premiership.

=== Wolverhampton Wanderers ===
On 30 August 2024, Sutherland signed for Premier League club Wolverhampton Wanderers, joining the club's under-21s side.

On 7 February 2025, Sutherland joined National League side Solihull Moors on loan for the remainder of the season.

On 10 August 2026, Sutherland signed for EFL League Two club Exeter City on a season-long loan. Sutherland made his Exeter debut the same day, coming off the bench after 65 minutes in an EFL Cup match against local rivals Plymouth Argyle. He received a red card for two bookable offences, as Exeter lost the tie 2–0.

== International career ==
Sutherland was born in Scotland to a Scottish father and Zimbabwean mother, and holds dual British-Zimbabwean citizenship. On 25 September 2024, Sutherland was called up to the Scotland U19 squad for the first time. The following month, he made his debut in a 2–1 win over Hungary U19.

== Playing style ==
Traditionally used as a winger, since his move to Wolverhampton Wanderers, Sutherland has more commonly been utilised as a full-back or wing-back.

== Career statistics ==
=== Club ===
As of match played 10 August 2026

Appearances and goals by club, season and competition
Club	Season	League			National Cup		League Cup		Other		Total	
Club	Season	Division	Apps	Goals	Apps	Goals	Apps	Goals	Apps	Goals	Apps	Goals
St Mirren	2023–24	Scottish Premiership	0	0	0	0	2	0	1 (Note: Appearances in Scottish Challenge Cup)	1	3	1
St Mirren	2024–25	Scottish Premiership	1	0	0	0	1	0	1	1	3	1
St Mirren	Total		1	0	0	0	3	0	2	2	6	2
Alloa Athletic (loan)	2023–24	Scottish League One	16	2	0	0	0	0	2 (Note: Appearances in Scottish Championship playoffs)	0	18	2
Wolverhampton Wanderers	2024–25	Premier League	0	0	0	0	0	0	1 (Note: Appearances in EFL Trophy)	0	1	0
Wolverhampton Wanderers	2025–26	Premier League	0	0	0	0	0	0	2	0	2	0
Wolverhampton Wanderers	2026–27	EFL Championship	0	0	0	0	0	0	0	0	0	0
Wolverhampton Wanderers	Total		0	0	0	0	0	0	3	0	3	0
Solihull Moors (loan)	2025–26	National League	5	0	0	0	–		–		5	0
Exeter City (loan)	2026–27	EFL League Two	0	0	0	0	1	0	0	0	1	0
Career total			22	2	0	0	4	0	7	2	33	4
