= 2025–26 Wolverhampton Wanderers F.C. season =

English football club season

Wolverhampton Wanderers
2025–26 season
- Owner: Fosun International
- Chairman: Jeff Shi (until 19 December); Nathan Shi (interim) (from 19 December) (permanent, executive chairman) (from 11 May)
- Head Coach: Vítor Pereira (until 2 November); Jamie Collins (interim) (from 2 November until 12 November); Rob Edwards (from 12 November)
- Stadium: Molineux Stadium
- Premier League: 20th (relegated)
- FA Cup: Fifth round
- EFL Cup: Fourth round
- Top goalscorer: League: Tolu Arokodare; Santiago Bueno; Rodrigo Gomes; Mateus Mané (3 each); All: Tolu Arokodare; Jørgen Strand Larsen (6 each)
- Highest home attendance: 31,253 (v. Tottenham Hotspur, Premier League, 25 April 2026)
- Lowest home attendance: 18,758 (v. Everton, EFL Cup, 23 September 2025)
- Average home league attendance: 29,833
- Biggest win: 6–1 v. Shrewsbury Town (H); FA Cup, 10 January 2026
- Biggest defeat: 0–4 v. Manchester City (H); Premier League, 16 August 2025; 0–4 v. West Ham United (A); Premier League, 10 April 2026
Home colours	Away colours	Third colours

The 2025–26 season was the 148th season in the history of Wolverhampton Wanderers Football Club, and their eighth consecutive season in the Premier League. In addition to the domestic league, the club also participated in the FA Cup and the EFL Cup.

== Season summary ==
Wolverhampton Wanderers suffered a disastrous start to the season; with just 3 points in their first 19 fixtures, the club set a record for the worst-ever Premier League start not including administrative point deductions. They also broke the Premier League record of most consecutive games without a win to start the season, with 19. Previously, the record was held by the 2020–21 Sheffield United squad. Things marginally improved after Matchday 20, when Wolves defeated West Ham United 3–0 on 3 January 2026 at Molineux Stadium. Two further wins followed, including a shock home win against Liverpool. However, Wolves remained bottom of the table and they were eventually officially relegated on 20 April 2026 following a 3-0 away defeat at Leeds United was followed by a goalless draw between West Ham United and Crystal Palace- thus ending the club's eight-year status in the English top flight. The team manager Victor Pereira was sacked in November, despite having signed a new three-year contract extension lasting until 2028 in September, He was replaced by Rob Edwards.

A few weeks after relegation, following a 3–0 away defeat against Brighton & Hove Albion on 9 May, Wolves became the second club to lose against all 19 opponents in a single Premier League season, after Sheffield United first did so in the 2023–24 season. On the final day of the season, following a 1-1 away draw at Burnley on 24 May, Wolves became the first club to fail to win all 19 away games in a single Premier League season, since Hull City last failed to do so in the 2009-10 season while it was the second time, and first since the 2003-04 season, where Wolves failed to do so, thus becoming the first team in Premier League history to suffer this on two occasions.

== Players ==
=== First-team squad ===
As of 7 February 2026

Note: Flags indicate national team as defined under FIFA eligibility rules; some limited exceptions apply. Players may hold more than one non-FIFA nationality.

No.	Pos.	Nation	Player
1	GK	POR	José Sá (3rd captain)
2	DF	IRL	Matt Doherty (vice-captain)
3	DF	ESP	Hugo Bueno (6th captain)
4	DF	URU	Santiago Bueno
6	DF	NOR	David Møller Wolfe
7	MF	BRA	André
8	MF	BRA	João Gomes (4th captain)
9	FW	ENG	Adam Armstrong
11	FW	KOR	Hwang Hee-chan (5th captain)
14	FW	NGR	Tolu Arokodare
15	DF	COL	Yerson Mosquera

No.	Pos.	Nation	Player
17	DF	BRA	Pedro Lima
21	FW	POR	Rodrigo Gomes
24	DF	POR	Toti Gomes (captain)
25	GK	ENG	Dan Bentley
27	MF	HAI	Jean‐Ricner Bellegarde
30	FW	PAR	Enso González
31	GK	ENG	Sam Johnstone
36	FW	POR	Mateus Mané
37	DF	CZE	Ladislav Krejčí (on loan from Girona)
38	DF	CMR	Jackson Tchatchoua
47	MF	ENG	Angel Gomes (on loan from Marseille)

=== Out on loan ===
Note: Flags indicate national team as defined under FIFA eligibility rules; some limited exceptions apply. Players may hold more than one non-FIFA nationality.

No.	Pos.	Nation	Player
5	MF	ZIM	Marshall Munetsi (at Paris FC until 30 June 2026)
6	MF	MLI	Boubacar Traoré (at Metz until 30 June 2026)
18	FW	AUT	Saša Kalajdžić (at LASK until 30 June 2026)
20	MF	ENG	Tommy Doyle (at Birmingham City until 30 June 2026)
23	MF	ZIM	Tawanda Chirewa (at Barnsley until 30 June 2026)

No.	Pos.	Nation	Player
26	DF	NED	Ki-Jana Hoever (at Sheffield United until 30 June 2026)
28	MF	ESP	Fer López (at Celta Vigo until 30 June 2026)
33	DF	NED	Nigel Lonwijk (at Luton Town until 30 June 2026)
34	DF	BFA	Nasser Djiga (at Rangers until 30 June 2026)

== Transfers and contracts ==
=== In ===
Date	Pos.	Player	From	Fee	Ref.
20 June 2025	RW	(Spain) Fer López	(Spain) Celta Vigo	£19,600,000	
1 July 2025	CF	(Norway) Jørgen Strand Larsen	(Spain) Celta Vigo	£23,000,000	
22 July 2025	CB	(Wales) Ashton Williams (Note: Signed initially for the Under-18s)	(England) Bristol City	Free transfer	
24 July 2025	RW	(Colombia) Jhon Arias	(Brazil) Fluminense	Undisclosed	
2 August 2025	LB	(Norway) David Møller Wolfe	(Netherlands) AZ	£10,000,000	
18 August 2025	RB	(Cameroon) Jackson Tchatchoua	(Italy) Hellas Verona	£10,800,000	
1 September 2025	ST	(Nigeria) Tolu Arokodare	(Belgium) Genk	£24,000,000	
1 September 2025	GK	(England) Alfie Brooks (Note: Signed initially for the Under-21s)	(England) AFC Telford United	Free transfer	
30 January 2026	DM	(China) Xu Bin (Note: Signed initially for the Under-21s)	(China) Qingdao West Coast	Free transfer	
30 January 2026	CF	(Republic of Ireland) Dapo Anunlopo (Note: Signed initially for the Under-18s)	(England) Bromley	Free transfer	
2 February 2026	CF	(England) Adam Armstrong	(England) Southampton	£7,000,000	

Expenditure: ▼ ~ £87,400,000

=== Out ===
Date	Pos.	Player	To	Fee	Ref.
2 June 2025	SS	(Brazil) Matheus Cunha	(England) Manchester United	£62,500,000	
9 June 2025	LB	(Algeria) Rayan Aït-Nouri	(England) Manchester City	£31,000,000	
10 June 2025	AM	(Wales) Chem Campbell	(England) Stevenage	Undisclosed	
9 July 2025	LW	(Portugal) Chiquinho	(Portugal) Alverca	Free transfer	
18 July 2025	DM	(Republic of Ireland) Joe Hodge	(Portugal) Tondela	Undisclosed	
21 July 2025	CB	(France) Bastien Meupiyou	(Portugal) Alverca	Undisclosed	
23 July 2025	RB	(Democratic Republic of the Congo) Marvin Kaleta	(England) Rotherham United	Undisclosed	
1 August 2025	LW	(Cayman Islands) Ben Lyne	(England) Manchester United	Free transfer	
4 August 2025	LW	(Portugal) Gonçalo Guedes	(Spain) Real Sociedad	£3,500,000	
15 August 2025	GK	(Wales) Tom King	(England) Everton	Free transfer	
21 August 2025	ST	(Australia) Lennon Biggs	(Wales) Wrexham	Free transfer	
21 August 2025	CF	(England) Wesley Graham	(Wales) Wrexham	Free transfer	
29 August 2025	ST	(Portugal) Fábio Silva	(Germany) Borussia Dortmund	£23,000,000	
24 October 2025	CB	(England) Josh Gidaree	(England) Wycombe Wanderers	Free transfer	
14 January 2026	CF	(England) Fletcher Holman	(England) Swindon Town	Undisclosed	
21 January 2026	CB	(England) Caden Voice	(Wales) Cardiff City	Free transfer	
2 February 2026	CF	(Norway) Jørgen Strand Larsen	(England) Crystal Palace	£43,000,000 (Note: Plus £5,000,000 in potential add-ons)	
6 February 2026	CB	(Ivory Coast) Emmanuel Agbadou	(Turkey) Beşiktaş	£17,400,000	
7 February 2026	AM	(Colombia) Jhon Arias	(Brazil) Palmeiras	£25,000,000	
26 March 2026	LW	(Jamaica) Fabian Reynolds	(United States) Huntsville City	Free transfer	

Income: ▲£180,400,000

=== Loaned in ===
Date	Pos.	Player	From	Date until	Ref.
28 August 2025	CB	(Czech Republic) Ladislav Krejčí	(Spain) Girona	31 May 2026	
2 February 2026	AM	(England) Angel Gomes	(France) Marseille	31 May 2026	

=== Loaned out ===
Date	Pos.	Player	To	Date until	Ref.
2 July 2025	CM	(England) Tommy Doyle	(England) Birmingham City	31 May 2026	
4 July 2025	GK	(England) Arthur Nasta	(England) Hornchurch	31 May 2026	
9 July 2025	CB	(Burkina Faso) Nasser Djiga	(Scotland) Rangers	31 May 2026	
10 July 2025	CB	(Netherlands) Nigel Lonwijk	(England) Luton Town	31 May 2026	
15 July 2025	GK	(Republic of Ireland) James Storer	(Scotland) Greenock Morton	31 May 2026	
19 July 2025	GK	(Wales) Lewys Benjamin	(England) Chester	31 May 2026	
24 July 2025	DM	(Mali) Boubacar Traoré	(France) Metz	31 May 2026	
22 August 2025	LW	(Jamaica) Fabian Reynolds	(England) Redditch United	31 May 2026	
28 August 2025	CB	(England) Hayden Carson	(England) Chester	31 May 2026	
1 September 2025	MF	(England) Harvey Griffiths	(England) Crewe Alexandra	1 January 2026	
1 September 2025	MF	(Jamaica) Dexter Lembikisa	(England) Lincoln City	1 January 2026	
1 September 2025	RB	(Brazil) Pedro Lima	(Portugal) Porto	5 January 2026 (Note: On 5 January 2026, Lima was recalled from his season-long loan at Porto.)	
5 September 2025	CF	(Austria) Saša Kalajdžić	(Austria) LASK	31 May 2026	
13 September 2025	GK	(Northern Ireland) Joshua Gracey	(England) AFC Telford United	13 October 2025	
20 September 2025	CB	(England) Caden Voice	(England) Kettering Town	18 October 2025	
15 November 2025	GK	(Republic of Ireland) Xander Grieves	(England) Telford United	22 November 2025	
26 November 2025	CB	(England) Alfie White	(England) Hednesford Town	28 December 2025	
3 January 2026	CB	(England) Alfie Pond	(England) Crewe Alexandra	31 May 2026	
8 January 2026	RB	(Netherlands) Ki-Jana Hoever	(England) Sheffield United	31 May 2026	
9 January 2026	LW	(England) Emilio Ballard-Matthews	(England) Darlaston Town 1874	8 February 2025	
9 January 2026	GK	(Republic of Ireland) Xander Grieves	(England) Rugby Town	8 February 2025	
16 January 2026	CM	(Zimbabwe) Marshall Munetsi	(France) Paris	31 May 2026	
23 January 2026	CB	(Italy) Temple Ojinnaka	(England) Shrewsbury Town	31 May 2026	
26 January 2026	CAM	(Spain) Fer López	(Spain) Celta Vigo	31 May 2026	
30 January 2026	AM	(Zimbabwe) Tawanda Chirewa	(England) Barnsley	31 May 2026	

=== Released / Out of contract ===
Date	Pos.	Player	Subsequent club	Joined date	Ref.
30 June 2025	CB	(Democratic Republic of the Congo) Filozofe Mabete	(England) Swindon Town	1 July 2025	
30 June 2025	RW	(Spain) Pablo Sarabia	(Qatar) Al-Arabi	1 July 2025	
30 June 2025	FW	(England) Tashall Sandhu	(England) Plymouth Argyle	22 July 2025	
30 June 2025	GK	(England) Lucas Kibrya	(United States) Chowan Hawks	25 July 2025	
30 June 2025	CB	(Indonesia) Justin Hubner	(Netherlands) Fortuna Sittard	29 July 2025	
30 June 2025	RB	(Portugal) Nélson Semedo	(Turkey) Fenerbahçe	31 July 2025	
30 June 2025	GK	(England) Stan Amos	(England) Stourbridge FC	11 August 2025	
30 June 2025	GK	(England) George Hardy	(England) Charlton Athletic	19 September 2025	
30 June 2025	LB	(England) Aaron Keto-Diyawa	(England) Alfreton Town	24 September 2025	
30 June 2025	CM	(England) Matthew Whittingham	(England) Runcorn Linnets	7 August 2026	
30 June 2025	CB	(England) Craig Dawson			
30 June 2025	CM	(England) Joshua Nyakudya			
30 June 2025	LB	(England) Testimony Igbinoghene			
2 February 2026	LW	(Portugal) Leo Lopes	(Portugal) Trofense	2 February 2026	
2 February 2026	RW	(Wales) Josh Esen	(Turkey) Fatih Karagümrük	1 September 2026	
11 March 2026	CB	(England) Hayden Carson	(England) Saford City	11 February 2026	

=== New contract ===
Date	Pos.	Player	Contract	Ref.
9 July 2025	RB	(England) Wesley Okoduwa	Undisclosed (Note: First professional contract)	
10 July 2025	CF	(Portugal) Mateus Mané	30 June 2027	
11 August 2025	LW	(England) Emilio Ballard-Matthews	Undisclosed	
19 September 2025	CDM	(Wales) Makenzie Bradbury	Undisclosed	
19 September 2025	CB	(Italy) Elvis Elendu	Undisclosed	
19 September 2025	LW	(South Korea) Ji Min-kyu	Undisclosed	
19 September 2025	CF	(Norway) Jørgen Strand Larsen	30 June 2030 (Note: Option for a further year)	
5 November 2025	RWB	(England) Myles Dayman	Undisclosed	
5 November 2025	CM	(England) Hayden Ford	Undisclosed	
13 April 2026	CDM	(England) Luke Rawlings	30 June 2027	

== Pre-season and friendlies ==
On 5 June, Wolverhampton Wanderers announced their first pre-season fixture, against Stoke City. A week later, a home friendly against La Liga side Celta Vigo was confirmed. A short training camp in Spain was next to be added to the schedule, along with a friendly against another La Liga side Girona. On 20 June, a fourth friendly was announced against Lens at Walsall's Bescot Stadium.

Win Draw Loss Fixtures

15 July 2025 Friendly	Santa Clara	2–1	Wolverhampton Wanderers	Algarve, Portugal
12:00 WEST		Report	Kalajdzic	Stadium: TBA

19 July 2025 Friendly	Burnley	1–1	Wolverhampton Wanderers	Algarve, Portugal
12:00 WEST	Bruun Larsen	Report	Larsen	Stadium: TBA

26 July 2025 Friendly	Stoke City	1–1	Wolverhampton Wanderers	Stoke-on-Trent
15:00 BST	Bae Jun-ho 44'	Report	Hwang Hee-chan 75'	Stadium: Bet365 Stadium

30 July 2025 Friendly	Wolverhampton Wanderers	1–3	Lens	Bescot
19:30 BST	Guedes 81'; S. Bueno (yellow card) 87'	Report	Thomasson (yellow card) 34'; Guilavogui (yellow card) 38'; Ojediran (yellow card) 57'; Saïd 60'; Machado 69', 83'	Stadium: Bescot Stadium

3 August 2025 Friendly	Girona	2–1	Wolverhampton Wanderers	Girona, Spain
20:00 CEST	Herrera 51'; Roca 56'; Miovski (yellow card) 90+1'	Report	Munetsi (yellow card) 20'; Agbadou (yellow card) 62'; Arias 78'; André (yellow card) 81'	Stadium: Estadi Montilivi

9 August 2025 Friendly	Wolverhampton Wanderers	0–1	Celta Vigo	Wolverhampton
15:00 BST		Report	Durán 58'	Stadium: Molineux Stadium

== Competitions ==
=== Overall record ===
Competition	First match	Last match	Starting round	Final position	Record							
Competition	First match	Last match	Starting round	Final position	Pld	W	D	L	GF	GA	GD	Win %
Premier League	16 August 2025	24 May 2026	Matchday 1	20th	38	3	11	24	27	68	−41	7.89
FA Cup	10 January 2026	6 March 2026	Third round	Fifth round	3	2	0	1	8	4	+4	66.67
EFL Cup	26 August 2025	29 October 2025	Second round	Fourth round	3	2	0	1	8	6	+2	66.67
Total					44	7	11	26	43	78	−35	15.91

Source: Soccerway

=== Premier League ===
==== League table ====
Pos	Team	Pld	W	D	L	GF	GA	GD	Pts	Qualification or relegation
16	Nottingham Forest	38	11	11	16	48	51	−3	44	
17	Tottenham Hotspur	38	10	11	17	48	57	−9	41	
18	West Ham United (R)	38	10	9	19	46	65	−19	39	Relegation to EFL Championship
19	Burnley (R)	38	4	10	24	38	75	−37	22	Relegation to EFL Championship
20	Wolverhampton Wanderers (R)	38	3	11	24	27	68	−41	20	Relegation to EFL Championship

Source: Premier League
Rules for classification: 1) Points; 2) Goal difference; 3) Goals scored; 4) If the champions, relegated teams or qualified teams for UEFA competitions cannot be determined by rules 1 to 3, rules 4.1 to 4.3 are applied – 4.1) Points gained in head-to-head record between such teams; 4.2) Away goals scored in head-to-head record between such teams; 4.3) Play-offs
(R) Relegated

==== Results summary ====
Overall								Home						Away					
Pld	W	D	L	GF	GA	GD	Pts	W	D	L	GF	GA	GD	W	D	L	GF	GA	GD
38	3	11	24	27	68	−41	20	3	5	11	19	34	−15	0	6	13	8	34	−26

Source: Soccerway

==== Results by round ====
Round	1	2	3	4	5	6	7	8	9	10	11	12	13	14	15	16	17	18	19	20	21	22	23	24	25	26	31^{1}	27	28	29	30	32	33	34	35	36	37	38
Ground	H	A	H	A	H	A	H	A	H	A	A	H	A	H	H	A	H	A	A	H	A	H	A	H	H	A	H	A	H	H	A	A	A	H	H	A	H	A
Result	L	L	L	L	L	D	D	L	L	L	L	L	L	L	L	L	L	L	D	W	D	D	L	L	L	D	D	L	W	W	D	L	L	L	D	L	D	D
Position	20	19	20	20	20	20	20	20	20	20	20	20	20	20	20	20	20	20	20	20	20	20	20	20	20	20	20	20	20	20	20	20	20	20	20	20	20	20

Source: Soccerway
A = Away; H = Home; W = Win; D = Draw; L = Loss
Notes:
- ^{1} Matchday 31 (v. Arsenal) was brought forward due to opposition in the 2026 EFL Cup final.

==== Matches ====
On 18 June, the Premier League fixtures were revealed, with Wolverhampton Wanderers at home to Manchester City on the opening weekend.

Win Draw Loss Fixtures

16 August 2025 1	Wolverhampton Wanderers	0–4	Manchester City	Wolverhampton
17:30 BST	Doherty (yellow card) 67'	Report	Haaland 34', 61'; Reijnders 37', (yellow card) 54'; Cherki 81'; O'Reilly (yellow card) 81'	Stadium: Molineux Stadium; Attendance: 31,118 (2,963 away fans); Referee: Jarred Gillett

23 August 2025 2	Bournemouth	1–0	Wolverhampton Wanderers	Bournemouth
15:00 BST	Tavernier 4'; Adams (yellow card) 58'; Scott (yellow card) 63'	Report	Toti (yellow card) 9' (red card) 49'; H. Bueno (yellow card) 63'; Doherty (yellow card) 84'; João Gomes (yellow card) 85'	Stadium: Dean Court; Attendance: 11,070 (1,247 away fans); Referee: Thomas Bramall

30 August 2025 3	Wolverhampton Wanderers	2–3	Everton	Wolverhampton
15:00 BST	Hwang Hee-chan 21'; R. Gomes 79'	Report	Beto 7'; Dewsbury-Hall (yellow card) 16', (goal) 55'; Ndiaye 33'	Stadium: Molineux Stadium; Attendance: 30,271 (2,957 away fans); Referee: Michael Oliver

13 September 2025 4	Newcastle United	1–0	Wolverhampton Wanderers	Newcastle upon Tyne
15:00 BST	Woltemade 29'; Guimarães (yellow card) 88'	Report	Krejčí (yellow card) 7'; André (yellow card) 31'; Munetsi (yellow card) 67'; João Gomes (yellow card) 68'	Stadium: St James' Park; Attendance: 52,145 (2,701 away fans); Referee: Chris Kavanagh

20 September 2025 5	Wolverhampton Wanderers	1–3	Leeds United	Wolverhampton
15:00 BST	Krejčí 8'; López (yellow card) 12'	Report	Calvert-Lewin 31'; Stach 39'; Bogle (yellow card) 41'; Okafor 45'	Stadium: Molineux Stadium; Attendance: 30,807 (2,962 away fans); Referee: Anthony Taylor

27 September 2025 6	Tottenham Hotspur	1–1	Wolverhampton Wanderers	Tottenham
20:00 BST	Simons (yellow card) 32'; Bergvall (yellow card) 65'; Palhinha 90+4', (yellow card) 90+4'	Report	Doherty (yellow card) 35'; João Gomes (yellow card) 39'; S. Bueno 54'	Stadium: Tottenham Hotspur Stadium; Attendance: 60,537 (2,978 away fans); Referee: Michael Salisbury
Note: Fixture was initially scheduled for a 15:00 kick-off, but was moved for live Sky Sports broadcast.

5 October 2025 7	Wolverhampton Wanderers	1–1	Brighton & Hove Albion	Wolverhampton
14:00 BST	Verbruggen 21' (o.g.); S. Bueno (yellow card) 51'; André (yellow card) 90+6'	Report	Baleba (yellow card) 20'; Dunk (yellow card) 36'; Wieffer (yellow card) 43'; Welbeck (yellow card) 45+2'; Van Hecke 86'	Stadium: Molineux Stadium; Attendance: 29,504 (2,969 away fans); Referee: Jarred Gillett
Note: Fixture was initially scheduled for 4 October, but was moved for live Sky Sports broadcast.

18 October 2025 8	Sunderland	2–0	Wolverhampton Wanderers	Sunderland
15:00 BST	Mukiele 16'; Krejčí 90+2' (o.g.)	Report		Stadium: Stadium of Light; Attendance: 46,578 (3,026 away fans); Referee: Robert Jones

26 October 2025 9	Wolverhampton Wanderers	2–3	Burnley	Wolverhampton
14:00 GMT	Bellegarde (yellow card) 35'; Larsen 42' (pen.); Munetsi 45+4'	Report	Flemming 14', 30'; Foster 90+5'	Stadium: Molineux Stadium; Attendance: 29,116 (1,803 away fans); Referee: Tony Harrington
Note: Fixture was initially scheduled for 25 October, but was moved for live Sky Sports broadcast.

1 November 2025 10	Fulham	3–0	Wolverhampton Wanderers	Fulham
15:00 GMT	Sessegnon 9'; Wilson 62'; Mosquera 75' (o.g.); Berge (yellow card) 90+3'	Report	Agbadou (red card) 36'; Toti (yellow card) 40'; Mosquera (yellow card) 74'; S. Bueno (yellow card) 84'	Stadium: Craven Cottage; Attendance: 26,413 (2,641 away fans); Referee: John Brooks

8 November 2025 11	Chelsea	3–0	Wolverhampton Wanderers	Fulham
20:00 GMT	Gusto 51'; Caicedo (yellow card) 60'; João Pedro 65'; Neto 73'	Report	André (yellow card) 49'; Munetsi (yellow card) 79'	Stadium: Stamford Bridge; Attendance: 39,467 (2,121 away fans); Referee: Andrew Kitchen
Note: Fixture was initially scheduled for a 15:00 kick-off, but was moved for live Sky Sports broadcast.

22 November 2025 12	Wolverhampton Wanderers	0–2	Crystal Palace	Wolverhampton
15:00 GMT	Arokodare (yellow card) 50'; João Gomes (yellow card) 77'	Report	Guéhi (yellow card) 4'; Pino (yellow card) 59', (goal) 69'; Muñoz 63', (yellow card) 66'	Stadium: Molineux Stadium; Attendance: 29,976 (2,939 away fans); Referee: Anthony Taylor

30 November 2025 13	Aston Villa	1–0	Wolverhampton Wanderers	Birmingham
14:05 GMT	Kamara 67'	Report	André (yellow card) 45+2'; Wolfe (yellow card) 58'; Mosquera (yellow card) 76'; Arias (yellow card) 80'	Stadium: Villa Park; Attendance: 42,139 (2,940 away fans); Referee: Chris Kavanagh
Note: Fixture was initially scheduled for 29 November, but was moved for live Sky Sports broadcast.

3 December 2025 14	Wolverhampton Wanderers	0–1	Nottingham Forest	Wolverhampton
19:30 GMT	João Gomes (yellow card) 52'; Mosquera (yellow card) 67'	Report	Milenković (yellow card) 19'; Anderson (yellow card) 61'; Igor Jesus 72'	Stadium: Molineux Stadium; Attendance: 28,646 (2,948 away fans); Referee: Tim Robinson
Note: Fixture was initially scheduled for a 19:45 kick-off, but was moved for live Sky Sports broadcast.

8 December 2025 15	Wolverhampton Wanderers	1–4	Manchester United	Wolverhampton
20:00 GMT	Larsen (yellow card) 44'; Bellegarde 45+2'; Krejčí (yellow card) 46'; Mosquera (yellow card) 81'	Report	Fernandes 25', 82' (pen.); Mbeumo (yellow card) 38', (goal) 51'; Mount 62'; Zirkzee (yellow card) 90+6'	Stadium: Molineux Stadium; Attendance: 30,338 (2,967 away fans); Referee: Michael Salisbury
Note: Fixture was initially scheduled for 6 December, but was moved for live Sky Sports broadcast.

13 December 2025 16	Arsenal	2–1	Wolverhampton Wanderers	Holloway
20:00 GMT	Johnstone 70' (o.g.); Mosquera 90+4' (o.g.)	Report	Hwang Hee-chan (yellow card) 60'; Doherty (yellow card) 65'; Arokodare 90'; Mosquera (yellow card) 90+6'; Agbadou (yellow card) 90+8'	Stadium: Emirates Stadium; Attendance: 60,242 (2,943 away fans); Referee: Robert Jones
Note: Fixture was initially scheduled for a 15:00 kick-off, but was moved for live TNT Sports broadcast.

20 December 2025 17	Wolverhampton Wanderers	0–2	Brentford	Wolverhampton
15:00 GMT	João Gomes (yellow card) 24'; Hwang Hee-chan (yellow card) 44'; Larsen (penalty missed) 89'	Report	Van den Berg (yellow card) 19'; Kayode (yellow card) 44'; Lewis-Potter 63', 83'; Henry (yellow card) 72'; Janelt (yellow card) 90'	Stadium: Molineux Stadium; Attendance: 27,622 (1,575 away fans); Referee: Matt Donohue

27 December 2025 18	Liverpool	2–1	Wolverhampton Wanderers	Liverpool
15:00 GMT	Gravenberch 41'; Wirtz 42'	Report	S. Bueno 51'; André (yellow card) 56'	Stadium: Anfield; Attendance: 60,466 (2,998 away fans); Referee: Simon Hooper

30 December 2025 19	Manchester United	1–1	Wolverhampton Wanderers	Trafford
20:15 GMT	Zirkzee 27'	Report	Krejčí 45'; Tchatchoua (yellow card) 63'; Larsen (yellow card) 90+5'	Stadium: Old Trafford; Attendance: 73,941 (3,039 away fans); Referee: Thomas Bramall
Note: Fixture was initially scheduled for a 19:45 kick-off, but was moved for live Sky Sports broadcast.

3 January 2026 20	Wolverhampton Wanderers	3–0	West Ham United	Wolverhampton
15:00 GMT	Arias 4'; Hwang Hee-chan 31' (pen.); Mané 41'; Tchatchoua (yellow card) 85'	Report		Stadium: Molineux Stadium; Attendance: 29,874 (2,966 away fans); Referee: Peter Bankes

7 January 2026 21	Everton	1–1	Wolverhampton Wanderers	Liverpool
19:30 GMT	Keane 17', (red card) 83'; Iroegbunam (yellow card) 77'; Grealish (yellow card) 87' (yellow-red card) 90'	Report	Sá (yellow card) 43'; Mosquera (yellow card) 57'; Mané 69'; Hwang Hee-chan (yellow card) 77'	Stadium: Hill Dickinson Stadium; Attendance: 51,768 (2,941 away fans); Referee: Thomas Kirk
Note: Fixture was initially scheduled for a 19:45 kick-off, but was moved for live Sky Sports broadcast.

18 January 2026 22	Wolverhampton Wanderers	0–0	Newcastle United	Wolverhampton
14:00 GMT	Mosquera (yellow card) 78'; André (yellow card) 90+5'	Report	Tonali (yellow card) 58'; Botman (yellow card) 89'	Stadium: Molineux Stadium; Attendance: 29,751 (2,960 away fans); Referee: Sam Barrott
Note: Fixture was initially scheduled for 17 January, but was moved for live Sky Sports broadcast.

24 January 2026 23	Manchester City	2–0	Wolverhampton Wanderers	Manchester
15:00 GMT	Marmoush 6'; Semenyo 45+2'; Nunes (yellow card) 71'	Report	André (yellow card) 57'; João Gomes (yellow card) 67'; Mosquera (yellow card) 88'	Stadium: City of Manchester Stadium; Attendance: 52,469 (3,005 away fans); Referee: Farai Hallam

31 January 2026 24	Wolverhampton Wanderers	0–2	Bournemouth	Wolverhampton
15:00 GMT	André (yellow card) 45+1'; Mosquera (yellow card) 61'; João Gomes (yellow card) 75'	Report	Kroupi 33'; Jiménez (yellow card) 58'; Adli (yellow card) 60'; Hill (yellow card) 88'; Scott 90+1'	Stadium: Molineux Stadium; Attendance: 30,161 (1,802 away fans); Referee: Michael Oliver

7 February 2026 25	Wolverhampton Wanderers	1–3	Chelsea	Wolverhampton
15:00 GMT	Armstrong (yellow card) 45+4'; Arokodare 54'	Report	Palmer 13' (pen.), 35' (pen.), 38'; Cucurella (yellow card) 73'	Stadium: Molineux Stadium; Attendance: 29,762 (2,968 away fans); Referee: Jarred Gillett

11 February 2026 26	Nottingham Forest	0–0	Wolverhampton Wanderers	West Bridgford
19:30 GMT		Report	Tchatchoua (yellow card) 75'; Bellegarde (yellow card) 86'	Stadium: City Ground; Attendance: 29,921 (2,988 away fans); Referee: Tim Robinson
Note: Fixture was initially scheduled for a 19:45 kick-off, but was moved for live TNT Sports broadcast.

18 February 2026 31	Wolverhampton Wanderers	2–2	Arsenal	Wolverhampton
20:00 GMT	S. Bueno (yellow card) 45+4'; H. Bueno 61'; Bellegarde (yellow card) 71'; Edozie 90+4'	Report	Saka 5'; Hincapié 56'; Jesus (yellow card) 90+9'	Stadium: Molineux Stadium; Attendance: 29,843 (2,970 away fans); Referee: Paul Tierney
Note: Fixture was originally scheduled for 21 March, but was brought forward a month due to Arsenal's participation in the EFL Cup final.

21 February 2026 27	Crystal Palace	1–0	Wolverhampton Wanderers	Selhurst
15:00 GMT	Hughes (yellow card) 15'; Canvot (yellow card) 31'; Wharton (yellow card) 41'; Riad (yellow card) 67'; Guessand 90'; Sarr (yellow card) 90+6'	Report	Arokodare (penalty missed) 43'; Krejčí (yellow card) 58' (yellow-red card) 61'; André (yellow card) 90+3'	Stadium: Selhurst Park; Attendance: 24,547 (2,266 away fans); Referee: Thomas Kirk

27 February 2026 28	Wolverhampton Wanderers	2–0	Aston Villa	Wolverhampton
20:00 GMT	Mosquera (yellow card) 45+1'; Armstrong (yellow card) 51'; Bellegarde (yellow card) 58'; João Gomes 61'; R. Gomes 90+8'	Report	Buendía (yellow card) 54'; Bailey (yellow card) 75'; Cash (yellow card) 90+2'	Stadium: Molineux Stadium; Attendance: 30,197 (2,968 away fans); Referee: Craig Pawson
Note: Fixture was initially scheduled for 28 February, but was moved for live Sky Sports broadcast.

3 March 2026 29	Wolverhampton Wanderers	2–1	Liverpool	Wolverhampton
20:15 GMT	João Gomes (yellow card) 69'; R. Gomes 78'; S. Bueno (yellow card) 90'; André 90+4'	Report	Gravenberch (yellow card) 22'; Salah 83'	Stadium: Molineux Stadium; Attendance: 30,247 (2,970 away fans); Referee: Thomas Bramall
Note: Fixture was initially scheduled for a 20:00 kick-off, but was moved for live TNT Sports broadcast.

16 March 2026 30	Brentford	2–2	Wolverhampton Wanderers	Brentford
20:00 GMT	Kayode 22'; Thiago 37'; Collins (yellow card) 57'; Ajer (yellow card) 77'	Report	Armstrong (yellow card) 24', (goal) 44'; Krejčí (yellow card) 45+1'; Arokodare 77'; A. Gomes (yellow card) 89'; Sá (yellow card) 90+3'	Stadium: Brentford Community Stadium; Attendance: 17,155 (1,699 away fans); Referee: Stuart Attwell
Note: Fixture was initially scheduled for 14 March, but was moved for live Sky Sports broadcast.

10 April 2026 32	West Ham United	4–0	Wolverhampton Wanderers	Stratford
20:00 BST	Fernandes (yellow card) 31'; Mavropanos 42', 83'; Castellanos (yellow card) 52', (goal) 66', 68'	Report	Bellegarde (yellow card) 9'; Mosquera (yellow card) 20'	Stadium: London Stadium; Attendance: 62,457 (2,137 away fans); Referee: Jarred Gillett
Note: Fixture was initially scheduled for 11 April, but was moved for live Sky Sports broadcast.

18 April 2026 33	Leeds United	3–0	Wolverhampton Wanderers	Leeds
15:00 BST	Justin 18'; Okafor 20'; Aaronson (yellow card) 73'; Calvert-Lewin 90+5' (pen.)	Report	H. Bueno (yellow card) 90+3'	Stadium: Elland Road; Attendance: 36,840 (2,900 away fans); Referee: Farai Hallam

25 April 2026 34	Wolverhampton Wanderers	0–1	Tottenham Hotspur	Wolverhampton
15:00 BST	André (yellow card) 45+3'; H. Bueno (yellow card) 56'; João Gomes (yellow card) 90+6'	Report	Porro (yellow card) 56'; Bentancur (yellow card) 65'; Gallagher (yellow card) 74'; Palhinha 82'; Danso (yellow card) 90+7'	Stadium: Molineux Stadium; Attendance: 31,253 (2,956 away fans); Referee: Anthony Taylor

2 May 2026 35	Wolverhampton Wanderers	1–1	Sunderland	Wolverhampton
15:00 BST	S. Bueno 54'	Report	Mukiele 17'; Ballard (red card) 24'; Brobbey (yellow card) 45+2'; Xhaka (yellow card) 56'; Cirkin (yellow card) 81'; Roefs (yellow card) 90+2'	Stadium: Molineux Stadium; Attendance: 29,632 (2,959 away fans); Referee: Paul Tierney

9 May 2026 36	Brighton & Hove Albion	3–0	Wolverhampton Wanderers	Brighton and Hove
15:00 BST	Hinshelwood 1'; Dunk 5'; Mitoma (yellow card) 24'; Minteh 86'	Report	Hwang Hee-chan (yellow card) 49'; André (yellow card) 68'	Stadium: Falmer Stadium; Attendance: 31,587 (1,699 away fans); Referee: John Brooks

17 May 2026 37	Wolverhampton Wanderers	1–1	Fulham	Wolverhampton
15:00 BST	Mané 25'; André (yellow card) 90+4'	Report	Robinson 45+3' (pen.)	Stadium: Molineux Stadium; Attendance: 28,709 (1,611 away fans); Referee: Thomas Kirk

24 May 2026 38	Burnley	1–1	Wolverhampton Wanderers	Burnley
15:00 BST	Mejbri (yellow card) 45+9'; Flemming 47'; Barnes (yellow card) 90+4'	Report	Armstrong 5' (pen.); Hwang Hee-chan (yellow card) 41'; Mosquera (yellow card) 90+4'	Stadium: Turf Moor; Attendance: 21,057 (2,540 away fans); Referee: Andrew Kitchen

=== FA Cup ===
Wolves entered the FA Cup in the third round, and were drawn at home to Shrewsbury Town They were then drawn away to Grimsby Town in the fourth round, and at home to Liverpool in the fifth round.

Win Draw Loss Fixtures

10 January 2026 Third round	Wolverhampton Wanderers	6–1	Shrewsbury Town	Wolverhampton
12:15 GMT	Larsen 9', 41', 58'; Arias 11'; R. Gomes 86'; André (yellow card) 90+1'; Arokodare 90+2'	Report	Ruffles (yellow card) 14'; Marquis 26' (pen.); Anderson (yellow card) 69'	Stadium: Molineux Stadium; Attendance: 24,258 (2,922 away fans); Referee: Stephen Martin

15 February 2026 Fourth round	Grimsby Town	0–1	Wolverhampton Wanderers	Cleethorpes
13:30 GMT	McJannet (yellow card) 34'; Kabia (yellow card) 46'	Report	Mosquera (yellow card) 29'; André (yellow card) 36'; S. Bueno 60'	Stadium: Blundell Park; Attendance: 8,594 (1,264 away fans); Referee: Sam Barrott

6 March 2026 Fifth round	Wolverhampton Wanderers	1–3	Liverpool	Wolverhampton
20:00 GMT	S. Bueno (yellow card) 17'; Hwang Hee-chan 90+1'; João Gomes (yellow card) 90+5'	Report	Robertson 51'; Salah 53'; Szoboszlai (yellow card) 71'; Jones 74'	Stadium: Molineux Stadium; Attendance: 29,881 (4,812 away fans); Referee: Farai Hallam

=== EFL Cup ===
Wolves entered the EFL Cup in the second round, and were drawn at home to West Ham United. They were then drawn at home to Everton in the third round, and at home to Chelsea in the fourth round.

Win Draw Loss Fixtures

26 August 2025 Second round	Wolverhampton Wanderers	3–2	West Ham United	Wolverhampton
19:30 BST	Hwang Hee-chan (penalty missed) 43'; R. Gomes 43'; Agbadou (yellow card) 54'; André (yellow card) 75'; Larsen 82', 84'	Report	Souček 50'; Paquetá 63'; Ward-Prowse (yellow card) 71'	Stadium: Molineux Stadium; Attendance: 19,561 (2,743 away fans); Referee: Darren England

23 September 2025 Third round	Wolverhampton Wanderers	2–0	Everton	Wolverhampton
19:45 BST	Munetsi 29'; S. Bueno (yellow card) 71'; Arokodare 87'; João Gomes (yellow card) 90+3'	Report	Barry (yellow card) 32'; Garner (yellow card) 90+1'	Stadium: Molineux Stadium; Attendance: 18,758 (2,968 away fans); Referee: Craig Pawson

29 October 2025 Fourth round	Wolverhampton Wanderers	3–4	Chelsea	Wolverhampton
19:45 GMT	R. Gomes (yellow card) 31'; Arokodare 48'; Hwang Hee-chan (yellow card) 54'; Wolfe 73', 90+1'; Krejčí (yellow card) 90+2'	Report	Santos 5'; George 15', (yellow card) 72'; Estêvão (yellow card) 24', (goal) 41'; Delap (yellow card) 79' (yellow-red card) 86'; Gittens 89'; Cucurella (yellow card) 90'; Caicedo (yellow card) 90+4'	Stadium: Molineux Stadium; Attendance: 24,449 (2,954 away fans); Referee: Thomas Bramall

== Statistics ==
=== Appearances and goals ===
As of match played 24 May 2026

Players with no appearances are not included on the list, italics indicate a loaned in player.

No.	Pos	Nat	Player	Total		Premier League		FA Cup		EFL Cup	
No.	Pos	Nat	Player	Apps	Goals	Apps	Goals	Apps	Goals	Apps	Goals
1	GK	(Portugal) POR	José Sá	24	0	23	0	0	0	1	0
2	DF	(Republic of Ireland) IRL	Matt Doherty	15	0	11	0	1	0	2+1	0
3	DF	(Spain) ESP	Hugo Bueno	35	1	23+9	1	1	0	2	0
4	DF	(Uruguay) URU	Santiago Bueno	34	4	28+1	3	3	1	2	0
6	DF	(Norway) NOR	David Møller Wolfe	26	2	11+11	0	2+1	0	1	2
7	MF	(Brazil) BRA	André	39	1	30+5	1	2	0	2	0
8	MF	(Brazil) BRA	João Gomes	41	1	32+3	1	3	0	1+2	0
9	FW	(England) ENG	Adam Armstrong	16	2	14	2	1+1	0	0	0
11	FW	(South Korea) KOR	Hwang Hee-chan	31	3	18+8	2	1+1	1	3	0
14	FW	(Nigeria) NGR	Tolu Arokodare	38	6	13+20	3	2+1	1	1+1	2
15	DF	(Colombia) COL	Yerson Mosquera	31	0	24+3	0	2	0	2	0
17	DF	(Brazil) BRA	Pedro Lima	10	0	3+6	0	0+1	0	0	0
21	MF	(Portugal) POR	Rodrigo Gomes	27	5	9+13	3	0+2	1	1+2	1
24	DF	(Portugal) POR	Toti Gomes	22	0	17+2	0	1	0	1+1	0
25	GK	(England) ENG	Dan Bentley	3	0	3	0	0	0	0	0
27	MF	(Haiti) HAI	Jean‐Ricner Bellegarde	31	1	15+11	1	1+1	0	2+1	0
31	GK	(England) ENG	Sam Johnstone	17	0	12	0	3	0	2	0
36	FW	(Portugal) POR	Mateus Mané	30	3	19+8	3	2+1	0	0	0
37	MF	(Czech Republic) CZE	Ladislav Krejčí	32	2	27+1	2	2	0	1+1	0
38	DF	(Cameroon) CMR	Jackson Tchatchoua	36	0	19+12	0	3	0	1+1	0
47	MF	(England) ENG	Angel Gomes	12	0	6+5	0	1	0	0	0
50	MF	(England) ENG	Jerome Abbey	1	0	0+1	0	0	0	0	0
74	FW	(England) ENG	Tom Edozie	3	1	0+3	1	0	0	0	0
Players who featured but departed the club during the season:
9	FW	(Norway) NOR	Jørgen Strand Larsen	26	6	14+8	1	1	3	1+2	2
10	FW	(Colombia) COL	Jhon Arias	26	2	14+9	1	1	1	2	0
12	DF	(Ivory Coast) CIV	Emmanuel Agbadou	17	0	12+2	0	0	0	2+1	0
Players who featured but departed the club on loan during the season:
5	MF	(Zimbabwe) ZIM	Marshall Munetsi	15	2	9+4	1	0	0	1+1	1
18	MF	(Austria) AUT	Saša Kalajdžić	2	0	0+1	0	0	0	0+1	0
23	MF	(Zimbabwe) ZIM	Tawanda Chirewa	2	0	0+2	0	0	0	0	0
26	DF	(Netherlands) NED	Ki-Jana Hoever	8	0	6+2	0	0	0	0	0
28	MF	(Spain) ESP	Fer López	12	0	2+7	0	0+1	0	2	0

=== Discipline ===
As of match played 24 May 2026

Rank	No.	Pos.	Player	Premier League			FA Cup			EFL Cup			Total		
Rank	No.	Pos.	Player	Yellow card	(yellow card) (yellow-red card)	Red card	Yellow card	(yellow card) (yellow-red card)	Red card	Yellow card	(yellow card) (yellow-red card)	Red card	Yellow card	(yellow card) (yellow-red card)	Red card
1	7	MF	(Brazil) André	12	0	0	2	0	0	1	0	0	15	0	0
2	15	DF	(Colombia) Yerson Mosquera	12	0	0	1	0	0	0	0	0	13	0	0
3	8	MF	(Brazil) João Gomes	10	0	0	1	0	0	1	0	0	12	0	0
4	4	DF	(Uruguay) Santiago Bueno	4	0	0	1	0	0	1	0	0	6	0	0
4	11	FW	(South Korea) Hwang Hee-chan	5	0	0	0	0	0	1	0	0	6	0	0
6	37	MF	(Czech Republic) Ladislav Krejčí	3	1	0	0	0	0	1	0	0	4	1	0
7	27	MF	(Haiti) Jean‐Ricner Bellegarde	5	0	0	0	0	0	0	0	0	5	0	0
8	2	DF	(Republic of Ireland) Matt Doherty	4	0	0	0	0	0	0	0	0	4	0	0
9	12	DF	(Ivory Coast) Emmanuel Agbadou	1	0	1	0	0	0	1	0	0	2	0	1
10	3	DF	(Spain) Hugo Bueno	3	0	0	0	0	0	0	0	0	3	0	0
10	9	FW	(England) Adam Armstrong	3	0	0	0	0	0	0	0	0	3	0	0
10	38	DF	(Cameroon) Jackson Tchatchoua	3	0	0	0	0	0	0	0	0	3	0	0
13	24	DF	(Portugal) Toti Gomes	1	1	0	0	0	0	0	0	0	1	1	0
14	1	GK	(Portugal) José Sá	2	0	0	0	0	0	0	0	0	2	0	0
14	5	MF	(Zimbabwe) Marshall Munetsi	2	0	0	0	0	0	0	0	0	2	0	0
14	9	FW	(Norway) Jørgen Strand Larsen	2	0	0	0	0	0	0	0	0	2	0	0
17	6	DF	(Norway) David Møller Wolfe	1	0	0	0	0	0	0	0	0	1	0	0
17	10	FW	(Colombia) Jhon Arias	1	0	0	0	0	0	0	0	0	1	0	0
17	14	FW	(Nigeria) Tolu Arokodare	1	0	0	0	0	0	0	0	0	1	0	0
17	21	MF	(Portugal) Rodrigo Gomes	0	0	0	0	0	0	1	0	0	1	0	0
17	28	MF	(Spain) Fer López	1	0	0	0	0	0	0	0	0	1	0	0
17	47	MF	(England) Angel Gomes	1	0	0	0	0	0	0	0	0	1	0	0
Total				71	2	1	5	0	0	7	0	0	83	2	1

== Club awards ==
=== Player of the Month award ===
Voted for by fans on the official Wolves App.

Month	Player
August	(Haiti) Jean-Ricner Bellegarde
September	(Czech Republic) Ladislav Krejčí
October	(Czech Republic) Ladislav Krejčí
November	Not awarded
December	(Portugal) Mateus Mané
January	(Portugal) Mateus Mané
February	(Uruguay) Santiago Bueno
