= Rodrigo Gomes =

Portuguese footballer (born 2003)

Personal information
- Full name: Rodrigo Martins Gomes
- Date of birth: 7 July 2003 (age 23)
- Place of birth: Povoa de Varzim, Portugal
- Height: 1.74 m (5 ft 9 in)
- Positions: Winger; wing-back

Team information
- Current team: Wolverhampton Wanderers
- Number: 21

Youth career
- 2011–2012: Póvoa Lanhoso
- 2012–2014: Prozis Academy
- 2014–2020: Braga
- 2016–2017: → Palmeiras Braga (loan)

Senior career*
Years	Team	Apps	(Gls)
2020–2024	Braga	31	(1)
2021–2022	Braga B	15	(5)
2023–2024	→ Estoril (loan)	30	(7)
2024–	Wolverhampton Wanderers	50	(7)

International career^{‡}
2018–2019	Portugal U16	8	(1)
2019–2020	Portugal U17	9	(3)
2021	Portugal U18	2	(1)
2021	Portugal U19	6	(0)
2022–2023	Portugal U20	6	(1)
2023–2025	Portugal U21	15	(5)
- * Club domestic league appearances and goals as of 23:48, 29 August 2026 (UTC) ‡ National team caps and goals as of 08:44, 10 June 2024 (UTC)

Rodrigo Martins Gomes (born 7 July 2003) is a Portuguese professional footballer who plays as a winger or wing-back for EFL Championship club Wolverhampton Wanderers.

== Club career ==
=== Braga ===
Born in Póvoa de Varzim and a product of Braga's youth system, Gomes made his debut in the Primeira Liga on 3 October 2020 in a 4–0 win at Tondela, as a substitute playing the final two minutes in place of Fransérgio. On 14 December, he made his first start in a 7–0 Taça de Portugal fourth round win at third-tier Olímpico do Montijo, being taken off for Iuri Medeiros after 69 minutes.

On 19 July 2021, Gomes signed a new contract until 2026, increasing his buyout clause from €15 million to €35 million. After a season in the reserves in Liga 3, he scored his first top-flight goal on 21 August 2022, coming on as a late replacement to conclude a 5–0 win over Marítimo at the Estádio Municipal de Braga.

==== Loan to Estoril ====
On 4 August 2023, Braga announced that Gomes would be sent on a season-long loan to Primeira Liga side Estoril Praia, with no future option to make the deal permanent. Four days later, Estoril officially announced the loan signing. At Estoril, Gomes began playing as a wing-back, mainly on the right side of the pitch.

==== Wolverhampton Wanderers ====
On 12 June 2024, Braga's president, António Salvador, publicly confirmed that the club had reached an agreement for the permanent transfer of Gomes to Premier League side Wolverhampton Wanderers. He later signed a contract until 2029 in a deal worth £12.7m.

== Career statistics ==
As of match played 29 August 2026

Appearances and goals by club, season and competition
Club	Season	League			National cup (Note: Includes Taça de Portugal, FA Cup)		League cup (Note: Includes Taça da Liga, EFL Cup)		Europe		Total	
Club	Season	Division	Apps	Goals	Apps	Goals	Apps	Goals	Apps	Goals	Apps	Goals
Braga	2020–21	Primeira Liga	4	0	1	0	1	0	0	0	6	0
Braga	2021–22	Primeira Liga	12	0	0	0	0	0	6 (Note: Appearances in UEFA Europa League)	0	18	0
Braga	2022–23	Primeira Liga	15	1	3	1	3	0	6 (Note: Five appearances in UEFA Europa League, one appearance in UEFA Europa Conference League)	0	27	2
Braga	Total		31	1	4	1	4	0	12	0	51	2
Braga B	2021–22	Liga 3	3	1	—		—		—		3	1
Estoril (loan)	2023–24	Primeira Liga	30	7	3	2	3	0	—		36	9
Wolverhampton Wanderers	2024–25	Premier League	25	2	2	1	1	0	—		28	3
Wolverhampton Wanderers	2025–26	Premier League	22	3	2	1	3	1	—		27	5
Wolverhampton Wanderers	2026–27	Championship	3	2	0	0	2	0	—		5	2
Wolverhampton Wanderers	Total		50	7	4	2	6	1	—		60	10
Career total			114	16	11	5	13	1	12	0	150	22
