= David Møller Wolfe =

Norwegian footballer (born 2002)

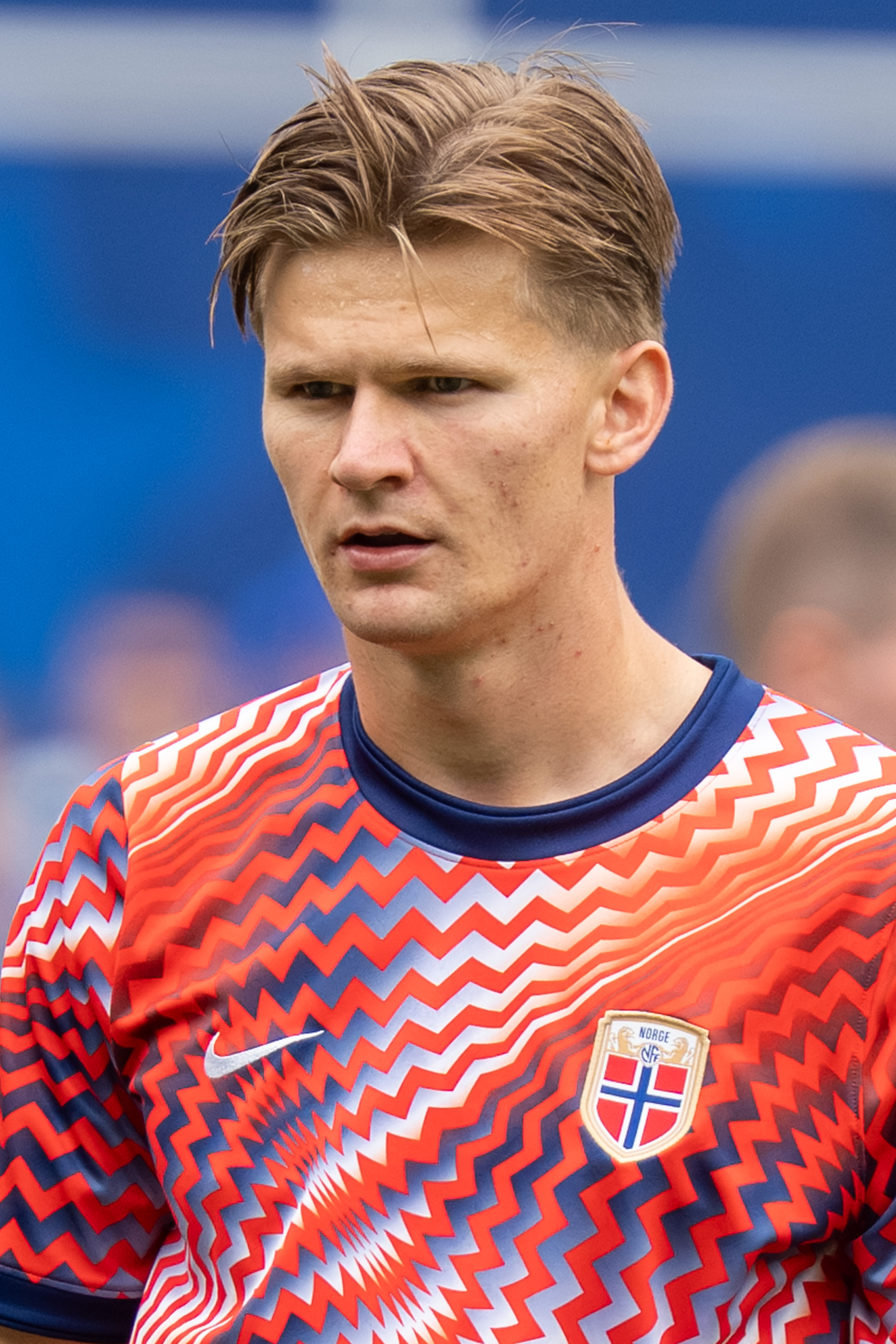
- Wolfe with Norway in 2026

Personal information
- Full name: David Møller Wolfe
- Date of birth: 23 April 2002 (age 24)
- Place of birth: Bergen, Norway
- Height: 1.85 m (6 ft 1 in)
- Positions: Left-back; left wing-back

Team information
- Current team: Hamburger SV (on loan from Wolverhampton Wanderers)
- Number: 3

Youth career
- Bergen Nord
- 2019: Brann

Senior career*
Years	Team	Apps	(Gls)
2017–2019	Bergen Nord	13	(2)
2020–2023	Brann	56	(1)
2020	→ Åsane (loan)	26	(1)
2023–2025	AZ	67	(3)
2025–	Wolverhampton Wanderers	24	(0)
2026–	→ Hamburger SV (loan)	7	(0)

International career^{‡}
2019	Norway U17	7	(0)
2020	Norway U18	3	(1)
2021–2023	Norway U20	9	(0)
2023	Norway U21	8	(0)
2023–	Norway	32	(1)
- * Club domestic league appearances and goals as of 1 November 2026 ‡ National team caps and goals as of 17 November 2026

David Møller Wolfe (born 23 April 2002) is a Norwegian professional footballer who plays as a left-back or left wing-back for Bundesliga club Hamburger SV, on loan from EFL Championship club Wolverhampton Wanderers, and the Norway national team.

== Club career ==
=== Bergen and Brann ===
Wolfe started his career in Bergen Nord, playing on the senior team in 2017, 2018 and 2019 before joining the junior team of SK Brann in the summer of 2019. The same year, he became a Norway youth international player. In 2020, Wolfe was loaned out to Åsane for the entire season. In 2021 he signed a three-year contract with Brann. He made his Eliteserien debut in May 2021 against Viking, as a left winger.

=== AZ ===
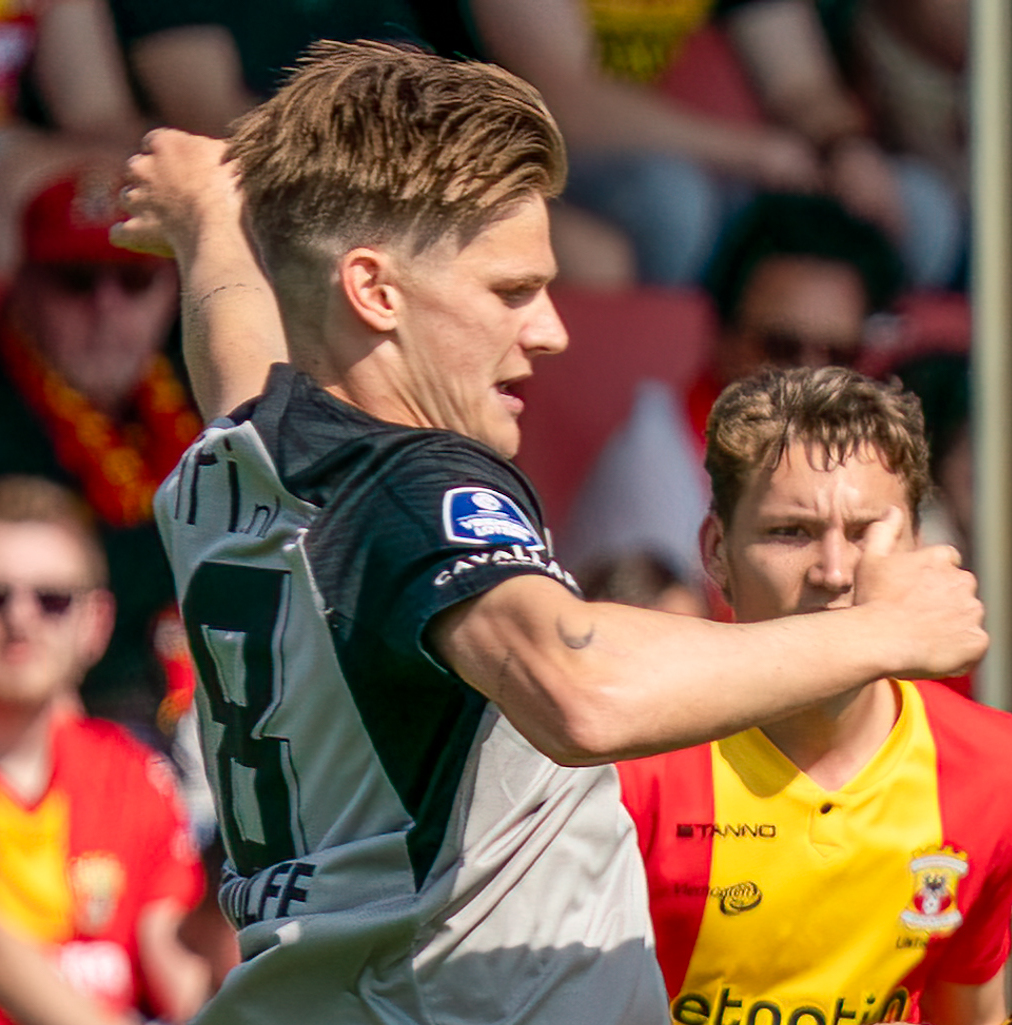
Wolfe playing for AZ in 2024

On 22 May 2023, Wolfe signed a five-year contract with Dutch Eredivisie club AZ Alkmaar.

=== Wolverhampton Wanderers ===
On 2 August 2025, Wolfe signed for Premier League club Wolverhampton Wanderers on a five-year deal worth €10 million plus €2.1 million in add-ons.

== International career ==
Wolfe made his debut for the Norway under-21 national team on 28 March 2023 in a match against Portugal. He came on as a substitute, but Norway were defeated 3–0.

On 21 May 2026, Wolfe was included in the 26-man squad selected by Norway national team manager Ståle Solbakken for the 2026 FIFA World Cup.

== Career statistics ==
=== Club ===
As of match played 1 November 2026

Appearances and goals by club, season and competition
Club	Season	League			National cup (Note: Includes Norwegian Cup, KNVB Cup, FA Cup)		League cup (Note: Includes EFL Cup)		Europe		Other		Total	
Club	Season	Division	Apps	Goals	Apps	Goals	Apps	Goals	Apps	Goals	Apps	Goals	Apps	Goals
Brann	2020	Eliteserien	0	0	0	0	—		—		—		0	0
Brann	2021	Eliteserien	20	1	1	0	—		—		—		21	1
Brann	2022	Norwegian First Division	25	0	2	0	—		—		—		27	0
Brann	2023	Eliteserien	11	0	5	0	—		—		—		17	0
Brann	Total		56	1	8	0	—		—		—		64	1
Åsane (loan)	2020	Norwegian First Division	26	1	0	0	—		—		2 (Note: Appearances in Norwegian First Division play-offs)	0	28	1
AZ	2023–24	Eredivisie	34	1	1	0	—		10 (Note: Appearances in UEFA Europa Conference League)	0	—		45	1
AZ	2024–25	Eredivisie	33	2	4	0	—		10 (Note: Appearances in UEFA Europa League)	1	—		47	3
AZ	Total		67	3	5	0	—		20	1	—		92	4
Wolverhampton Wanderers	2025–26	Premier League	22	0	3	0	1	2	—		—		26	2
Wolverhampton Wanderers	2026–27	Championship	2	0	—		1	0	—		—		3	0
Wolverhampton Wanderers	Total		24	0	3	0	2	2	—		—		29	2
Hamburger SV (loan)	2026–27	Bundesliga	7	0	1	0	—		—		—		8	0
Career total			180	5	17	0	2	2	20	1	2	0	221	8

=== International ===
As of match played 17 November 2026

Appearances and goals by national team and year
National team	Year	Apps	Goals
Norway	2023	1	0
Norway	2024	7	0
Norway	2025	10	1
Norway	2026	14	0
Total		32	1

Scores and results list Norway's goal tally first.

List of international goals scored by David Møller Wolfe
No.	Date	Venue	Opponent	Score	Result	Competition
1	25 March 2025	Nagyerdei Stadion, Debrecen, Hungary	Israel	1–0	4–2	2026 FIFA World Cup qualification

== Honours ==
Individual

- Eliteserien Young Player of the Month: April 2023
- Eredivisie Team of the Month: February 2025, May 2025
