= 2024–25 Wolverhampton Wanderers F.C. season =

English football club season

Wolverhampton Wanderers F.C.
2024–25 season
- Owner: Fosun International
- Chairman: Jeff Shi
- Head coach: Gary O'Neil (until 15 December); Vítor Pereira (from 19 December)
- Stadium: Molineux
- Premier League: 16th
- FA Cup: Fifth round
- EFL Cup: Third round
- Top goalscorer: League: Matheus Cunha (15); All: Matheus Cunha (17)
- Average home league attendance: 30,660
- Biggest win: 4–1 v Fulham (A) (23 November 2024, Premier League); 3–0 v Leicester City (A) (22 December 2024, Premier League); 3–0 v Leicester City (H) (26 April 2025, Premier League)
- Biggest defeat: 2–6 v Chelsea (H) (25 August 2024, Premier League); 0–4 v Everton (A) (5 December 2024, Premier League)
Home colours	Away colours	Third colours

The 2024–25 season was the 147th season in the history of Wolverhampton Wanderers Football Club, and their seventh consecutive season in the Premier League. In addition to the domestic league, the club also participated in the FA Cup and the EFL Cup.

== Season summary ==
During the first half of the season, the club were in danger of relegation. A poor start to the league, where Wolves failed to win any of their first ten matches and scored only 9 points from their first sixteen matches, left the team 19th in the standings and four points off safety, leading to the sacking of manager Gary O'Neil after a 2–1 home defeat to relegation rivals Ipswich Town. On 19 December 2024, Wolves announced former Porto and Olympiacos manager Vitor Pereira would replace O'Neil.

After the arrival of Pereira, Wolves' fortunes took a turn for the better, with the club taking 32 points from their next eighteen league games, including a six-match winning run to seal safety with five matches left to play. This marked Wolves' longest top-flight winning run since 1970.

== Players ==
=== First-team squad ===
As of 5 February 2025

Note: Flags indicate national team as defined under FIFA eligibility rules; some limited exceptions apply. Players may hold more than one non-FIFA nationality.

No.	Pos.	Nation	Player
1	GK	POR	José Sá
2	DF	IRL	Matt Doherty (vice-captain)
3	DF	ALG	Rayan Aït-Nouri
4	DF	URU	Santiago Bueno
5	MF	ZIM	Marshall Munetsi
6	MF	MLI	Boubacar Traoré
7	MF	BRA	André
8	MF	BRA	João Gomes
9	FW	NOR	Jørgen Strand Larsen (on loan from Celta Vigo)
10	FW	BRA	Matheus Cunha
11	FW	KOR	Hwang Hee-chan
12	DF	CIV	Emmanuel Agbadou
14	DF	COL	Yerson Mosquera
15	DF	ENG	Craig Dawson
18	FW	AUT	Saša Kalajdžić
19	FW	POR	Rodrigo Gomes

No.	Pos.	Nation	Player
20	MF	ENG	Tommy Doyle
21	MF	ESP	Pablo Sarabia
22	DF	POR	Nélson Semedo (captain)
24	DF	POR	Toti Gomes
25	GK	ENG	Dan Bentley
26	FW	POR	Carlos Forbs (on loan from Ajax)
27	MF	FRA	Jean‐Ricner Bellegarde
29	FW	POR	Gonçalo Guedes
30	FW	PAR	Enso González
31	GK	ENG	Sam Johnstone
33	DF	FRA	Bastien Meupiyou
34	DF	BFA	Nasser Djiga
37	DF	BRA	Pedro Lima
40	GK	WAL	Tom King
63	FW	IRL	Nathan Fraser

==== Out on loan ====
Note: Flags indicate national team as defined under FIFA eligibility rules; some limited exceptions apply. Players may hold more than one non-FIFA nationality.

No.	Pos.	Nation	Player
17	DF	ESP	Hugo Bueno (at Feyenoord until 30 June 2025)
23	FW	POR	Chiquinho (at Mallorca until 30 June 2025)
28	FW	ZIM	Tawanda Chirewa (at Huddersfield Town until 30 June 2025)
32	MF	IRL	Joe Hodge (at Huddersfield Town until 30 June 2025)

No.	Pos.	Nation	Player
33	DF	NED	Nigel Lonwijk (at Huddersfield Town until 30 June 2025)
35	DF	NED	Ki-Jana Hoever (at Auxerre until 30 June 2025)
77	FW	WAL	Chem Campbell (at Reading until 30 June 2025)
—	FW	POR	Fábio Silva (at Las Palmas until 30 June 2025)

== Transfers ==
=== In ===
Date	Pos.	Player	From	Fee	Ref.
14 June 2024 (Note: The transfer was announced on 3 May, and would become official on June 14 once the transfer window reopened)	CM	(England) Tommy Doyle	(England) Manchester City	Undisclosed	
14 June 2024 (Note: The transfer was announced on 12 June, and would become official on June 14 once the transfer window reopened)	RM	(Portugal) Rodrigo Gomes	(Portugal) Braga	£12,700,000	
2 July 2024	RB	(Brazil) Pedro Lima	(Brazil) Sport Recife	£8,500,000	
10 July 2024	GK	(England) Arthur Nasta (Note: Signed initially for the Under-21s)	(England) Larkhall Athletic	Undisclosed	
29 August 2024	CB	(France) Bastien Meupiyou	(France) Nantes	Undisclosed	
30 August 2024	GK	(England) Sam Johnstone	(England) Crystal Palace	£10,000,000	
30 August 2024	LB	(Scotland) Ethan Sutherland (Note: Signed initially for the Under-21s)	(Scotland) St. Mirren	Undisclosed	
30 August 2024	CB	(Scotland) Sebastian Lochhead (Note: Signed initially for the Under-18s)	(Scotland) Dundee	Undisclosed	
30 August 2024	CB	(England) Saheed Olagunju (Note: Signed initially for the Under-18s)	(England) Chelsea	Undisclosed	
30 August 2024	CM	(Brazil) André	(Brazil) Fluminense	Undisclosed	
25 September 2024	CM	(Republic of Ireland) Luke O'Donnell (Note: Signed initially for the Under-18s)	(Northern Ireland) Derry City	Undisclosed	
9 January 2025	CB	(Ivory Coast) Emmanuel Agbadou	(France) Reims	£16,600,000	
4 February 2025	CB	(Burkina Faso) Nasser Djiga	(Serbia) Red Star Belgrade	Undisclosed	
4 February 2025	CM	(Zimbabwe) Marshall Munetsi	(France) Reims	Undisclosed	

=== Out ===
Date	Pos.	Player	To	Fee	Ref.
2 July 2024	CB	(England) Oliver Tipton	(England) Solihull Moors	Undisclosed	
6 July 2024	CB	(England) Maximilian Kilman	(England) West Ham United	£40,000,000	
9 August 2024	LM	(Portugal) Pedro Neto	(England) Chelsea	£54,000,000	
3 September 2024	RW	(Portugal) Daniel Podence	(Saudi Arabia) Al-Shabab	Undisclosed	
17 January 2025	CF	(England) Owen Farmer	(England) Leamington	Free transfer	
25 January 2025	RW	(Jamaica) Tyler Roberts	(England) AFC Fylde	Free transfer	
31 January 2025	CM	(England) Luke Cundle	(England) Millwall	Undisclosed	
31 January 2025	RB	(Singapore) Harry Birtwistle	(Germany) Wacker Burghausen	Free transfer	
3 February 2025	AM	(England) Ryan Colesby	(England) West Bromwich Albion	Free transfer	
5 February 2025	CM	(Gabon) Mario Lemina	(Turkey) Galatasaray	£2,000,000	
10 February 2025	LB	(England) Lennon Patterson	(England) Sheffield United	Free transfer	

=== Loaned in ===
Date	Pos.	Player	From	Date until	Ref.
2 July 2024	CF	(Norway) Jørgen Strand Larsen	(Spain) Celta Vigo	End of season (Note: £2,500,000 loan fee)	
31 August 2024	RW	(Portugal) Carlos Forbs	(Netherlands) Ajax	End of season	

=== Loaned out ===
Date	Pos.	Player	To	Date until	Ref.
15 July 2024	RB	(Democratic Republic of the Congo) Marvin Kaleta	(Scotland) Motherwell	End of season	
3 August 2024	GK	(Republic of Ireland) Jimmy Storer	(England) Darlaston Town (1874)	1 January 2025	
13 August 2024	LB	(Spain) Hugo Bueno	(Netherlands) Feyenoord	End of season	
19 August 2024	CF	(Republic of Ireland) Nathan Fraser	(Belgium) Zulte Waregem	End of season (Note: On 12 December, Fraser was recalled from his season-long loan at Zulte Waregem.)	
21 August 2024	RB	(Netherlands) Ki-Jana Hoever	(France) Auxerre	End of season	
26 August 2024	AM	(Zimbabwe) Tawanda Chirewa	(England) Derby County	13 January 2025 (Note: On 13 January, Chirewa was recalled back from his loan at Derby)	
28 August 2024	CB	(Netherlands) Nigel Lonwijk	(England) Huddersfield Town	End of season	
28 August 2024	DM	(Republic of Ireland) Joe Hodge	(England) Huddersfield Town	End of season	
30 August 2024	RW	(Jamaica) Tyler Roberts	(England) AFC Fylde	End of season	
30 August 2024	CF	(Portugal) Fábio Silva	(Spain) Las Palmas	End of season	
30 August 2024	CF	(Wales) Chem Campbell	(England) Reading	End of season (Note: Loan move was initially until 5 January, but was extended to the end of the season.)	
30 August 2024	LW	(Portugal) Chiquinho	(Spain) Mallorca	End of season	
12 September 2024	RB	(Jamaica) Dexter Lembikisa	(Switzerland) Yverdon-Sport	31 December 2024 (Note: On 31 December, Lembikisa was recalled from his season-long loan at Yverdon-Sport.)	
9 January 2025	CF	(England) Fletcher Holman	(England) Solihull Moors	End of season	
10 January 2025	GK	(Republic of Ireland) Jimmy Storer	(England) Chester	End of season	
3 February 2025	AM	(Wales) Finn Ashworth	(England) Port Vale	End of Season	
3 February 2025	AM	(Zimbabwe) Tawanda Chirewa	(England) Huddersfield Town	End of season	
3 February 2025	RB	(Jamaica) Dexter Lembikisa	(England) Barnsley	End of Season	
7 February 2025	LW	(Scotland) Ethan Sutherland	(England) Solihull Moors	End of Season	

=== Released / Out of contract ===
Date	Pos.	Player	Subsequent club	Joined date	Ref.
30 June 2024	RB	(Hungary) Bendegúz Bolla	(Austria) Rapid Wien	1 July 2024	
30 June 2024	MF	(England) Dom Plank	(Scotland) Heart of Midlothian	1 July 2024	
30 June 2024	CB	(Italy) Muhamed Diomande	(England) West Bromwich Albion	10 July 2024	
30 June 2024	GK	(England) Joe Young	(England) Shrewsbury Town	27 July 2024	
30 June 2024	GK	(England) Louie Moulden	(England) Crystal Palace	22 August 2024	
3 September 2024	CM	(England) Mason Rees	(England) Rushall Olympic	3 September 2024	
6 September 2024	CB	(England) Kam Kandola	(England) Kidderminster Harriers	25 September 2024	
6 September 2024	RW	(England) Ethan McLeod	(England) Rushall Olympic	12 October 2024	
6 September 2024	AM	(Wales) Owen Hesketh	(England) Radcliffe	21 January 2025	
9 September 2024	AM	(England) Fraser Harper	(England) Newcastle United	16 October 2024	

== Pre-season and friendlies ==
On 9 May, Wolves announced they would return to the US for the first time in 43 years, as part of the inaugural Stateside Cup pre-season tournament, against West Ham United and Crystal Palace. A third friendly in the US was later confirmed against RB Leipzig. On 21 June, a home friendly versus Rayo Vallecano was confirmed.

Win Draw Loss Fixtures

15 July 2024 Friendly	Como	0–1	Wolverhampton Wanderers	Marbella, Spain
18:00 WEST (17:00 BST)		Report	Doherty	Stadium: Marbella Football Center

20 July 2024 Friendly	Wolverhampton Wanderers	3–0	Bristol City	Wolverhampton
13:00 BST	Cunha; Hwang Hee-chan; Own goal	Report		Stadium: Sir Jack Hayward Training Ground

27 July 2024 Stateside Cup	Wolverhampton Wanderers	3–1	West Ham United	Jacksonville, United States
19:00 EDT (00:00 BST)	Cunha 18'; Gomes 72', 77'	Report	Kudus 44'	Stadium: EverBank Stadium

31 July 2024 Stateside Cup	Crystal Palace	3–1	Wolverhampton Wanderers	Annapolis, United States
20:00 EDT (01:00 BST)	Schlupp 35'; Ayew 50'; Agbinone 90+4'	Report	S. Bueno 90'	Stadium: Navy–Marine Corps Memorial Stadium

3 August 2024 Friendly	Wolverhampton Wanderers	3–0	RB Leipzig	Fort Lauderdale, United States
19:30 EDT (00:30 BST)	Gomes (yellow card) 16', (goal) 73'; Sarabia 18', 62'; Semedo (yellow card) 82'	Report	Haidara (yellow card) 39'; Gebel (yellow card) 51'; Elmas (yellow card) 51'	Stadium: Chase Stadium

10 August 2024 Friendly	Wolverhampton Wanderers	0–1	Rayo Vallecano	Wolverhampton
15:00 BST		Report	Palazón 13'	Stadium: Molineux Stadium

== Competitions ==
=== Overall record ===
Competition	First match	Last match	Starting round	Final position	Record							
Competition	First match	Last match	Starting round	Final position	Pld	W	D	L	GF	GA	GD	Win %
Premier League	17 August 2024	25 May 2025	Matchday 1	16th	38	12	6	20	54	69	−15	31.58
FA Cup	11 January 2025	1 March 2025	Third round	Fifth round	3	2	1	0	5	2	+3	66.67
EFL Cup	28 August 2024	18 September 2024	Second round	Third round	2	1	0	1	4	3	+1	50.00
Total					43	15	7	21	63	74	−11	34.88

Source: Soccerway

=== Premier League ===
==== League table ====
Pos	Team	Pld	W	D	L	GF	GA	GD	Pts	Qualification or relegation
14	West Ham United	38	11	10	17	46	62	−16	43	
15	Manchester United	38	11	9	18	44	54	−10	42	
16	Wolverhampton Wanderers	38	12	6	20	54	69	−15	42	
17	Tottenham Hotspur	38	11	5	22	64	65	−1	38	Qualification for the Champions League league phase (Note: Tottenham Hotspur qualified for the Champions League league phase as the 2024–25 UEFA Europa League winners.)
18	Leicester City (R)	38	6	7	25	33	80	−47	25	Relegation to EFL Championship

Source: Premier League
Rules for classification: 1) Points; 2) Goal difference; 3) Goals scored; 4) If the champions, relegated teams or qualified teams for UEFA competitions cannot be determined by rules 1 to 3, rules 4.1 to 4.3 are applied – 4.1) Points gained in head-to-head record between such teams; 4.2) Away goals scored in head-to-head record between such teams; 4.3) Play-offs
(R) Relegated

==== Results summary ====
Overall								Home						Away					
Pld	W	D	L	GF	GA	GD	Pts	W	D	L	GF	GA	GD	W	D	L	GF	GA	GD
38	12	6	20	54	69	−15	42	6	3	10	27	32	−5	6	3	10	27	37	−10

Source: Soccerway

==== Results by round ====
Round	1	2	3	4	5	6	7	8	9	10	11	12	13	14	15	16	17	18	19	20	21	22	23	24	25	26	27	28	29	30	31	32	33	34	35	36	37	38
Ground	A	H	A	H	A	H	A	H	A	H	H	A	H	A	A	H	A	H	A	H	A	A	H	H	A	A	H	H	A	H	A	H	A	H	A	H	A	H
Result	L	L	D	L	L	L	L	L	D	D	W	W	L	L	L	L	W	W	D	L	L	L	L	W	L	W	L	D	W	W	W	W	W	W	L	L	L	D
Position	19	19	18	18	20	20	20	20	19	20	19	17	18	19	19	19	18	17	17	17	17	17	18	17	17	17	17	17	17	17	17	16	15	13	13	14	14	16
Points	0	0	1	1	1	1	1	1	2	3	6	9	9	9	9	9	12	15	16	16	16	16	16	19	19	22	22	23	26	29	32	35	38	41	41	41	41	42

Source: Soccerway
A = Away; H = Home; W = Win; D = Draw; L = Loss

==== Matches ====
On 18 June, the Premier League fixtures were released.

Win Draw Loss Fixtures

17 August 2024 1	Arsenal	2–0	Wolverhampton Wanderers	Holloway
15:00 BST	Havertz 25'; Saka (yellow card) 60', (goal) 74'; Gabriel Jesus (yellow card) 88'	Report	João Gomes (yellow card) 23'; Toti (yellow card) 38'	Stadium: Emirates Stadium; Attendance: 60,261 (2,943 away fans); Referee: Jarred Gillett

25 August 2024 2	Wolverhampton Wanderers	2–6	Chelsea	Wolverhampton
14:00 BST	Cunha 27'; Aït-Nouri (yellow card) 35'; Larsen 45+6'; Mosquera (yellow card) 71'	Report	Jackson 2'; Gusto (yellow card) 40'; Palmer (yellow card) 44', (goal) 45'; Madueke 49', 58', 63'; Cucurella (yellow card) 71'; Félix 80'	Stadium: Molineux Stadium; Attendance: 31,325 (2,944 away fans); Referee: Darren England
Note: Fixture was initially scheduled for 24 August, but was moved due to Chelsea's UEFA Conference League involvement.

31 August 2024 3	Nottingham Forest	1–1	Wolverhampton Wanderers	West Bridgford
15:00 BST	Wood 10'; Sangaré (yellow card) 40'; Anderson (yellow card) 90'; Gibbs-White (yellow card) 90+10'	Report	Bellegarde (yellow card) 9', (goal) 12'; João Gomes (yellow card) 32'; Toti (yellow card) 45'; Lemina (yellow card) 53'	Stadium: City Ground; Attendance: 29,918 (2,880 away fans); Referee: Simon Hooper

15 September 2024 4	Wolverhampton Wanderers	1–2	Newcastle United	Wolverhampton
16:30 BST	Lemina 36'; Aït-Nouri (yellow card) 63'; Semedo (yellow card) 70'; André (yellow card) 73'	Report	Joelinton (yellow card) 38'; Burn (yellow card) 52'; Schär 75'; Barnes 80'; Murphy (yellow card) 90+6'	Stadium: Molineux Stadium; Attendance: 30,255 (2,967 away fans); Referee: Chris Kavanagh
Note: Fixture was initially scheduled for 14 September, but was moved for live Sky Sports broadcast.

21 September 2024 5	Aston Villa	3–1	Wolverhampton Wanderers	Birmingham
15:00 BST	Torres (yellow card) 28'; Watkins 73'; Rogers (yellow card) 75'; Konsa 88'; Durán 90+4'; Barkley (yellow card) 90+11'	Report	Aït-Nouri (yellow card) 7'; Semedo (yellow card) 16'; Cunha 25', (yellow card) 90+12'; João Gomes (yellow card) 27'; Lemina (yellow card) 61'; Mosquera (yellow card) 81'	Stadium: Villa Park; Attendance: 39,978 (2,946 away fans); Referee: Tim Robinson

28 September 2024 6	Wolverhampton Wanderers	1–2	Liverpool	Wolverhampton
17:30 BST	André (yellow card) 30'; Aït-Nouri 56'; Forbs (yellow card) 87'	Report	Alexander-Arnold (yellow card) 6'; Jota (yellow card) 35'; Konaté 45+2', (yellow card) 63'; Salah 61' (pen.)	Stadium: Molineux Stadium; Attendance: 31,413 (2,970 away fans); Referee: Anthony Taylor
Note: Fixture was initially scheduled for a 15:00 kick-off, but was moved for live Sky Sports broadcast.

5 October 2024 7	Brentford	5–3	Wolverhampton Wanderers	Brentford
15:00 BST	Collins 2'; Mbeumo 20' (pen.); Nørgaard 28'; Pinnock 45+2'; Ajer (yellow card) 55'; Janelt (yellow card) 87'; Carvalho 90'	Report	Cunha 4'; Larsen 26'; Dawson (yellow card) 42'; Forbs (yellow card) 55'; Semedo (yellow card) 70'; Aït-Nouri 90+3'	Stadium: Brentford Community Stadium; Attendance: 16,960 (1,665 away fans); Referee: Andrew Madley

20 October 2024 8	Wolverhampton Wanderers	1–2	Manchester City	Wolverhampton
14:00 BST	Larsen 7'; Toti (yellow card) 14'; Semedo (yellow card) 20'; João Gomes (yellow card) 63'; Sarabia (yellow card) 90+8'	Report	Gvardiol 33'; Savinho (yellow card) 39'; Stones 90+5'	Stadium: Molineux Stadium; Attendance: 31,319 (2,970 away fans); Referee: Chris Kavanagh
Note: Fixture was initially scheduled for 19 October, but was moved for live Sky Sports broadcast.

26 October 2024 9	Brighton & Hove Albion	2–2	Wolverhampton Wanderers	Brighton and Hove
15:00 BST	Welbeck 45'; Rutter (yellow card) 56'; Igor (yellow card) 70'; Estupiñán (yellow card) 74'; Ferguson 85'	Report	Toti (yellow card) 41'; Larsen (yellow card) 45+3'; Aït-Nouri (yellow card) 50', (goal) 88'; Cunha 90+3'	Stadium: Falmer Stadium; Attendance: 31,840 (2,550 away fans); Referee: Michael Oliver

2 November 2024 10	Wolverhampton Wanderers	2–2	Crystal Palace	Wolverhampton
17:30 GMT	Larsen 67'; João Gomes 72'; Guedes (yellow card) 88'	Report	Chalobah 60'; Guéhi 77'; Hughes (yellow card) 79'; Muñoz (yellow card) 89'	Stadium: Molineux Stadium; Attendance: 29,505 (2,183 away fans); Referee: Anthony Taylor
Note: Fixture was initially scheduled for a 15:00 kick-off, but was moved for live Sky Sports broadcast.

9 November 2024 11	Wolverhampton Wanderers	2–0	Southampton	Wolverhampton
15:00 GMT	Sarabia 2'; Cunha 51'; Bellegarde (yellow card) 81'	Report	Harwood-Bellis (yellow card) 22'; Ramsdale (yellow card) 51'; Walker-Peters (yellow card) 78'; Ugochukwu (yellow card) 89'	Stadium: Molineux Stadium; Attendance: 31,403 (2,970 away fans); Referee: Thomas Bramall

23 November 2024 12	Fulham	1–4	Wolverhampton Wanderers	Fulham
15:00 GMT	Iwobi 20'; Bassey (yellow card) 45+4'; Pereira (yellow card) 57'; Tete (yellow card) 67'	Report	Cunha 31', 87'; João Gomes 53'; Guedes 90+5'	Stadium: Craven Cottage; Attendance: 26,685 (2,641 away fans); Referee: Robert Jones

30 November 2024 13	Wolverhampton Wanderers	2–4	Bournemouth	Wolverhampton
15:00 GMT	Semedo (yellow card) 2'; Larsen 5', 69', (yellow card) 90+4'; Dawson (yellow card) 53'; Sá (yellow card) 73'; Lemina (yellow card) 76'	Report	Kluivert 3' (pen.), 18' (pen.), 74' (pen.); Kerkez 8'; Zabarnyi (yellow card) 45'	Stadium: Molineux Stadium; Attendance: 30,478 (1,802 away fans); Referee: Peter Bankes

4 December 2024 14	Everton	4–0	Wolverhampton Wanderers	Liverpool
19:30 GMT	Young 10'; Mangala 33', (yellow card) 35'; Dawson 49', 72' (o.g.); Armstrong (yellow card) 90+1'	Report		Stadium: Goodison Park; Attendance: 38,820 (2,976 away fans); Referee: Michael Salisbury

9 December 2024 15	West Ham United	2–1	Wolverhampton Wanderers	Stratford
20:00 GMT	Emerson (yellow card) 45'; Soler (yellow card) 50'; Souček 54'; Bowen 72', (yellow card) 90+10'; Fabiański (yellow card) 90+4'; Rodríguez (yellow card) 90+5'	Report	Cunha (yellow card) 45+1'; Doherty (yellow card) 49', (goal) 69'; João Gomes (yellow card) 63'; Lemina (yellow card) 90+10'	Stadium: London Stadium; Attendance: 62,435 (2,509 away fans); Referee: John Brooks
Note: Fixture was initially scheduled for 7 December, but was moved for live Sky Sports broadcasting.

14 December 2024 16	Wolverhampton Wanderers	1–2	Ipswich Town	Wolverhampton
15:00 GMT	Aït-Nouri (yellow card) 45+1' (yellow-red card) 90+5'; Cunha 72'	Report	Doherty 15' (o.g.); Clarke (yellow card) 62'; Taylor 90+4', (yellow card) 90+5'	Stadium: Molineux Stadium; Attendance: 30,866 (2,952 away fans); Referee: Simon Hooper

22 December 2024 17	Leicester City	0–3	Wolverhampton Wanderers	Leicester
14:00 GMT	Vestergaard (yellow card) 22'; Soumaré (yellow card) 26'	Report	Guedes 19'; Gomes 36'; Cunha 44'	Stadium: King Power Stadium; Attendance: 31,818 (3,232 away fans); Referee: Anthony Taylor
Note: Fixture was initially scheduled for 21 December, but was moved following advice from local authorities due to a clash with Leicester Tigers also having a home fixture.

26 December 2024 18	Wolverhampton Wanderers	2–0	Manchester United	Wolverhampton
17:30 GMT	João Gomes (yellow card) 33'; Cunha 58'; Doherty (yellow card) 90'; Hwang Hee-chan 90+9'	Report	Yoro (yellow card) 4'; Fernandes (yellow card) 18' (yellow-red card) 47'; Ugarte (yellow card) 54'	Stadium: Molineux Stadium; Attendance: 31,407 (2,936 away fans); Referee: Tony Harrington
Note: Fixture was broadcast live on Amazon Prime Video.

29 December 2024 19	Tottenham Hotspur	2–2	Wolverhampton Wanderers	Tottenham
15:00 GMT	Bentancur 12', (yellow card) 90+7'; Son Heung-min (penalty missed) 43'; Johnson 45+3'	Report	Hwang Hee-chan 7'; Bellegarde (yellow card) 27'; Semedo (yellow card) 45+2'; Larsen 87'	Stadium: Tottenham Hotspur Stadium; Attendance: 61,284 (2,978 away fans); Referee: Chris Kavanagh

6 January 2025 20	Wolverhampton Wanderers	0–3	Nottingham Forest	Wolverhampton
20:00 GMT	Doyle (yellow card) 46'	Report	Gibbs-White 7'; Anderson (yellow card) 16'; Domínguez (yellow card) 30'; Wood 44'; Awoniyi 90+4'	Stadium: Molineux Stadium; Attendance: 29,940 (2,970 away fans); Referee: Peter Bankes
Note: Fixture was initially scheduled for 4 January, but was moved for live Sky Sports broadcasting.

15 January 2025 21	Newcastle United	3–0	Wolverhampton Wanderers	Newcastle upon Tyne
19:30 GMT	Isak 34', 57'; Gordon 74'	Report	Doherty (yellow card) 26'; Agbadou (yellow card) 85'	Stadium: St James' Park; Attendance: 51,975 (1,517 away fans); Referee: Darren England
Note: Fixture was initially scheduled for a 19:45 kick-off, but was moved for live TNT Sports broadcasting.

20 January 2025 22	Chelsea	3–1	Wolverhampton Wanderers	Fulham
20:00 GMT	Adarabioyo 24', (yellow card) 45+7'; Cucurella 60'; Madueke 65'; Caicedo (yellow card) 70'; George (yellow card) 88'; Sánchez (yellow card) 90+4'	Report	André (yellow card) 41'; Doherty 45+5'; Semedo (yellow card) 90'	Stadium: Stamford Bridge; Attendance: 39,221 (2,943 away fans); Referee: Simon Hooper
Note: Fixture was initially scheduled for 18 January, but was moved for live Sky Sports broadcast.

25 January 2025 23	Wolverhampton Wanderers	0–1	Arsenal	Wolverhampton
15:00 GMT	João Gomes (yellow card) 36' (yellow-red card) 70'	Report	Lewis-Skelly (red card) 43'; Timber (yellow card) 44'; Calafiori 74'	Stadium: Molineux Stadium; Attendance: 31,503 (2,969 away fans); Referee: Michael Oliver

1 February 2025 24	Wolverhampton Wanderers	2–0	Aston Villa	Wolverhampton
17:30 GMT	Bellegarde 12'; Sarabia (yellow card) 34'; Cunha 90+7', (yellow card) 90+7'	Report	McGinn (yellow card) 16'; Rogers (yellow card) 30'; Bogarde (yellow card) 45+2'	Stadium: Molineux Stadium; Attendance: 31,385 (2,966 away fans); Referee: Andrew Madley
Note: Fixture was originally scheduled for 15:00, but was moved for live Sky Sports broadcasting.

16 February 2025 25	Liverpool	2–1	Wolverhampton Wanderers	Liverpool
14:00 GMT	Díaz 15'; Konaté (yellow card) 31'; Salah 37' (pen.); Van Dijk (yellow card) 71'	Report	Doherty (yellow card) 26'; Agbadou (yellow card) 39'; Cunha 67'	Stadium: Anfield; Attendance: 60,401 (2,998 away fans); Referee: Simon Hooper
Note: Fixture was originally scheduled for 15 February, but was moved for live Sky Sports broadcasting.

22 February 2025 26	Bournemouth	0–1	Wolverhampton Wanderers	Bournemouth
15:00 GMT	Kerkez (yellow card) 22'; Zabarnyi (red card) 31'; Scott (yellow card) 85'; Arrizabalaga (yellow card) 90+7'	Report	Bueno (yellow card) 4'; Cunha 36'; João Gomes (yellow card) 44'; Doherty (yellow card) 90+1'	Stadium: Vitality Stadium; Attendance: 11,206 (1,247 away fans); Referee: Michael Salisbury

25 February 2025 27	Wolverhampton Wanderers	1–2	Fulham	Wolverhampton
19:30 GMT	João Gomes 18'; Bueno (yellow card) 28'	Report	Sessegnon 1'; Lukić (yellow card) 45+2'; Muniz 47'; Berge (yellow card) 53'; Robinson (yellow card) 90+4'	Stadium: Molineux Stadium; Attendance: 28,708 (838 away fans); Referee: Peter Bankes
Note: Fixture was initially scheduled for a 19:45 kick-off, but was moved for live TNT Sports broadcasting.

8 March 2025 28	Wolverhampton Wanderers	1–1	Everton	Wolverhampton
20:00 GMT	Munetsi 40'; André (yellow card) 53'; Larsen (yellow card) 62'	Report	Harrison 33'; Iroegbunam (yellow card) 79'; Alcaraz (yellow card) 85'	Stadium: Molineux Stadium; Attendance: 30,738 (2,969 away fans); Referee: Stuart Attwell
Note: Fixture was initially scheduled for a 15:00 kick-off, but was moved for live TNT Sports broadcasting.

15 March 2025 29	Southampton	1–2	Wolverhampton Wanderers	Southampton
15:00 GMT	Onuachu 75'	Report	Larsen 19', 47'	Stadium: St Mary's Stadium; Attendance: 30,950 (2,948 away fans); Referee: Robert Jones

1 April 2025 30	Wolverhampton Wanderers	1–0	West Ham United	Wolverhampton
19:45 BST	Larsen 21'; André (yellow card) 28'; Sá (yellow card) 31'; João Gomes (yellow card) 80'; Doherty (yellow card) 88'	Report	Mavropanos (yellow card) 31'; Füllkrug (yellow card) 73'	Stadium: Molineux Stadium; Attendance: 30,537 (2,944 away fans); Referee: Tony Harrington

5 April 2025 31	Ipswich Town	1–2	Wolverhampton Wanderers	Ipswich
15:00 BST	Delap 16'; Palmer (yellow card) 38'; Enciso (yellow card) 90'	Report	André (yellow card) 71'; Sarabia 72'; Larsen 84', (yellow card) 87'	Stadium: Portman Road; Attendance: 29,549 (2,955 away fans); Referee: Peter Bankes

13 April 2025 32	Wolverhampton Wanderers	4–2	Tottenham Hotspur	Wolverhampton
14:00 BST	Aït-Nouri 2'; Spence 38' (o.g.); Larsen 64'; Toti (yellow card) 86'; Cunha 86'	Report	Bissouma (yellow card) 8'; Tel 59'; Davies (yellow card) 70'; Richarlison 85'	Stadium: Molineux Stadium; Attendance: 31,463 (2,881 away fans); Referee: Anthony Taylor
Note: Fixture was originally scheduled for 12 April, but was moved due to Tottenham's UEFA Europa League involvements on the preceding Thursday.

20 April 2025 33	Manchester United	0–1	Wolverhampton Wanderers	Trafford
14:00 BST	Dorgu (yellow card) 56'; Eriksen (yellow card) 76'	Report	André (yellow card) 29'; Aït-Nouri (yellow card) 48'; Sarabia 77', (yellow card) 80'	Stadium: Old Trafford; Attendance: 73,819 (3,039 away fans); Referee: Robert Jones
Note: Fixture was originally scheduled for 19 April, but was moved due to Manchester United's UEFA Europa League involvements on the preceding Thursday.

26 April 2025 34	Wolverhampton Wanderers	3–0	Leicester City	Wolverhampton
15:00 BST	Toti (yellow card) 16'; Cunha 33'; Larsen 56'; Gomes 85'	Report	Faes (yellow card) 48'; McAteer (yellow card) 61'; Ndidi (yellow card) 65'; Vardy (penalty missed) 72'; Skipp (yellow card) 81'	Stadium: Molineux Stadium; Attendance: 31,518 (2,928 away fans); Referee: Sam Barrott

2 May 2025 35	Manchester City	1–0	Wolverhampton Wanderers	Manchester
20:00 BST	De Bruyne 35'	Report		Stadium: City of Manchester Stadium; Attendance: 52,563 (3,005 away fans); Referee: Peter Bankes
Note: Fixture was originally scheduled for 3 May, but was moved for live Sky Sports broadcasting.

10 May 2025 36	Wolverhampton Wanderers	0–2	Brighton & Hove Albion	Wolverhampton
15:00 BST	Cunha (yellow card) 27'	Report	Welbeck 28' (pen.); Wieffer (yellow card) 45+4'; Gruda 85'	Stadium: Molineux Stadium; Attendance: 31,279 (2,968 away fans); Referee: Michael Oliver

20 May 2025 37	Crystal Palace	4–2	Wolverhampton Wanderers	Selhurst
20:00 BST	Nketiah 27', 32'; Chilwell 50'; Ward (yellow card) 69'; Eze 86'	Report	Agbadou (yellow card) 22', (goal) 24'; Toti (yellow card) 59'; Larsen 62'	Stadium: Selhurst Park; Attendance: 24,766 (2,326 away fans); Referee: David Webb
Note: Fixture was initially scheduled for 18 May, but was postponed due to Crystal Palace's involvement in the FA Cup final.

25 May 2025 38	Wolverhampton Wanderers	1–1	Brentford	Wolverhampton
16:00 BST	João Gomes (yellow card) 35'; Semedo (yellow card) 72'; Munetsi 75'	Report	Mbeumo 20'; Wissa (yellow card) 60'	Stadium: Molineux Stadium; Attendance: 31,382 (2,874 away fans); Referee: Craig Pawson

=== FA Cup ===
Wolves entered the competition at the third round stage, and were drawn away against Bristol City, then to Blackburn Rovers in the fourth round, and to Bournemouth in the fifth round.

Win Draw Loss Fixtures

11 January 2025 Third round	Bristol City	1–2	Wolverhampton Wanderers	Bristol
12:00 GMT	McGuane (yellow card) 29'; Twine 45+1'	Report	Aït-Nouri 10'; Gomes 21'	Stadium: Ashton Gate; Attendance: 23,485 (3,362 away fans); Referee: Robert Jones

9 February 2025 Fourth round	Blackburn Rovers	0–2	Wolverhampton Wanderers	Blackburn
12:30 GMT	Buckley (yellow card) 16'; Kargbo (yellow card) 26'	Report	Bueno (yellow card) 17'; João Gomes 33'; Cunha 34'	Stadium: Ewood Park; Attendance: 15,141 (4,513 away fans); Referee: Lewis Smith

1 March 2025 Fifth round	Bournemouth	1–1 (a.e.t.) (5–4 p)	Wolverhampton Wanderers	Bournemouth
15:00 GMT	Evanilson 30'; Huijsen (yellow card) 62'; Scott (yellow card) 79'; Kluivert (yellow card) 106'; Hill (yellow card) 113'; Kerkez (yellow card) 120+1'	Report	João Gomes (yellow card) 32'; Cunha 60', (red card) 120'; Semedo (yellow card) 64'; Larsen (yellow card) 74'; Aït-Nouri (yellow card) 90+5'; Johnstone (yellow card) 120+10'	Stadium: Dean Court; Attendance: 11,021 (1,945 away fans); Referee: Chris Kavanagh
	Penalties
	Kluivert (penalty scored); Ouattara (penalty scored); Tavernier (penalty scored); Huijsen (penalty missed); Cook (penalty scored); Sinisterra (penalty scored)		(penalty scored) Larsen; (penalty scored) André; (penalty scored) Aït-Nouri; (penalty scored) Toti; (penalty missed) Doherty; (penalty missed) Traoré

=== EFL Cup ===
As a Premier League side not involved in any European competitions, Wolves entered the EFL Cup in the second round, and were drawn at home to EFL Championship club Burnley. In the third round, they were drawn away to fellow Premier League club Brighton & Hove Albion.

Win Draw Loss Fixtures

28 August 2024 Second round	Wolverhampton Wanderers	2–0	Burnley	Wolverhampton
19:30 BST	Guedes 38', 54'	Report	Roberts (yellow card) 73'	Stadium: Molineux Stadium; Attendance: 19,236 (1,087 away fans); Referee: Josh Smith

18 September 2024 Third round	Brighton & Hove Albion	3–2	Wolverhampton Wanderers	Brighton and Hove
19:45 BST	Baleba 14'; Adingra 31'; Estupiñán (yellow card) 36'; Hinshelwood (yellow card) 47'; Ferguson (yellow card) 62'; Moder (yellow card) 68'; Kadıoğlu 85'; Webster (yellow card) 90'	Report	Guedes 44'; Sarabia (yellow card) 45+1'; Doyle (yellow card) 75', (goal) 90+1'	Stadium: Falmer Stadium; Attendance: 16,018 (1,298 away fans); Referee: John Brooks

== Statistics ==
=== Appearances and goals ===
As of match played 25 May 2025

Players with no appearances are not included on the list
Italics indicate a loaned in player

No.	Pos	Nat	Player	Total		Premier League		FA Cup		EFL Cup	
No.	Pos	Nat	Player	Apps	Goals	Apps	Goals	Apps	Goals	Apps	Goals
1	GK	(Portugal) POR	José Sá	30	0	29	0	0	0	1	0
2	DF	(Republic of Ireland) IRL	Matt Doherty	35	2	25+5	2	1+2	0	1+1	0
3	DF	(Algeria) ALG	Rayan Aït-Nouri	41	5	37	4	2+1	1	1	0
4	DF	(Uruguay) URU	Santiago Bueno	34	0	18+11	0	3	0	2	0
5	MF	(Zimbabwe) ZIM	Marshall Munetsi	16	2	12+2	2	0+2	0	0	0
6	MF	(Mali) MLI	Boubacar Traoré	3	0	0+1	0	0+1	0	1	0
7	MF	(Brazil) BRA	André	36	0	31+2	0	1+2	0	0	0
8	MF	(Brazil) BRA	João Gomes	40	4	35+1	3	3	1	1	0
9	FW	(Norway) NOR	Jørgen Strand Larsen	38	14	30+5	14	2	0	0+1	0
10	FW	(Brazil) BRA	Matheus Cunha	36	17	29+4	15	2	2	0+1	0
11	FW	(South Korea) KOR	Hwang Hee-chan	26	2	5+17	2	2	0	1+1	0
12	DF	(Ivory Coast) CIV	Emmanuel Agbadou	18	1	16	1	2	0	0	0
14	DF	(Colombia) COL	Yerson Mosquera	5	0	5	0	0	0	0	0
15	DF	(England) ENG	Craig Dawson	16	0	10+5	0	0	0	1	0
19	FW	(Portugal) POR	Rodrigo Gomes	28	3	7+18	2	2	1	1	0
20	MF	(England) ENG	Tommy Doyle	26	1	3+21	0	0	0	2	1
21	FW	(Spain) ESP	Pablo Sarabia	27	3	7+15	3	1+2	0	2	0
22	DF	(Portugal) POR	Nélson Semedo	37	0	32+2	0	2	0	0+1	0
24	DF	(Portugal) POR	Toti Gomes	33	0	29+1	0	2	0	0+1	0
25	GK	(England) ENG	Dan Bentley	3	0	2	0	0	0	1	0
26	FW	(Portugal) POR	Carlos Forbs	11	0	1+9	0	0	0	0+1	0
27	MF	(France) FRA	Jean‐Ricner Bellegarde	39	2	20+15	2	2+1	0	0+1	0
29	FW	(Portugal) POR	Gonçalo Guedes	33	5	10+19	2	2	0	2	3
31	GK	(England) ENG	Sam Johnstone	10	0	7	0	3	0	0	0
34	DF	(Burkina Faso) BFA	Nasser Djiga	6	0	1+4	0	1	0	0	0
37	DF	(Brazil) BRA	Pedro Lima	6	0	1+2	0	0+1	0	2	0
40	GK	(Wales) WAL	Tom King	1	0	0+1	0	0	0	0	0
46	DF	(England) ENG	Alfie Pond	4	0	0+1	0	0+2	0	1	0
59	FW	(England) ENG	Mateus Mané	1	0	0+1	0	0	0	0	0
Players who featured but departed the club permanently during the season:
5	MF	(Gabon) GAB	Mario Lemina	19	1	15+2	1	0	0	0+2	0
10	FW	(Portugal) POR	Daniel Podence	3	0	0+2	0	0	0	1	0
Player who featured but departed the club on loan during the season:
23	FW	(Portugal) POR	Chiquinho	2	0	0+1	0	0	0	1	0

== Club awards ==
=== Player of the Month award ===
Voted for by fans on the official Wolves App.

Month	Player
August	(Brazil) Matheus Cunha
September	(Brazil) André
October	(Portugal) Nélson Semedo
November	(Brazil) Matheus Cunha
December	(Brazil) Matheus Cunha
January	(Ivory Coast) Emmanuel Agbadou
February	(France) Jean‐Ricner Bellegarde
March	(Brazil) André
April	(Norway) Jørgen Strand Larsen
