= Mateus Mané =

Portuguese footballer (born 2007)

Personal information
- Full name: Mateus Bula Dami Mané
- Date of birth: 16 September 2007 (age 19)
- Place of birth: Barreiro, Portugal
- Height: 1.75 m (5 ft 9 in)
- Position: Forward

Team information
- Current team: Wolverhampton Wanderers
- Number: 36

Youth career
- 2014–2016: Barreirense
- Manchester Cobras
- Moston Brook
- Bee-Inspired Football Academy
- 2023–2024: Rochdale
- 2024–2025: Wolverhampton Wanderers

Senior career*
Years	Team	Apps	(Gls)
2025–	Wolverhampton Wanderers	28	(3)

International career^{‡}
2024–2025	England U18	7	(0)
2026–	Portugal U21	2	(0)
- * Club domestic league appearances and goals as of 23:33, 24 May 2026 (UTC) ‡ National team caps and goals as of 22:54, 2 April 2026 (UTC)

Mateus Bula Dami Mané (born 16 September 2007) is a Portuguese professional footballer who plays as a forward for EFL Championship club Wolverhampton Wanderers.

== Club career ==
A product of his local club Barreirense, he moved to Moston, Manchester, England with his mother aged eight in 2016.

After playing for grassroots clubs Manchester Cobras, Moston Brook and Bee-Inspired Football Academy, he joined Rochdale's youth academy in 2023 where he finished his development before appearing once on the bench in a National League match against Dagenham & Redbridge on 3 February 2024.

On 25 February 2024, he joined the academy of Wolverhampton Wanderers. He was included in a Premier League match-day squad for the first time for Wolves, for a match against Fulham on 25 February 2025.

On 10 May 2025, he made his senior and professional debut with Wolves as a substitute in a 2–0 Premier League loss to Brighton & Hove Albion.

On 27 December 2025, after a series of substitute appearances, he made his first start for Wolves, in a 2–1 league defeat away at Liverpool. On 3 January 2026, Mané scored his first senior goal, assisted, and won a penalty in a 3–0 win at Molineux against West Ham United, which was also Wolves' first league win of the season.

== International career ==
Born in Portugal, Mané is of Bissau-Guinean descent and moved to England at the age of eight. He holds Portuguese, Bissau-Guinean and British citizenship. In October 2024, he was simultaneously called up to the Portugal U18s and England U18s, where he opted to play for the latter.

In March 2026, Mane was named in the Portugal under-21 squad for the first time ahead of their Euro U21 qualifiers against Azerbaijan and Scotland, appearing off the bench in both matches as Portugal claimed a pair of victories.

== Career statistics ==
As of match played 24 May 2026

Appearances and goals by club, season and competition
Club	Season	League			FA Cup		EFL Cup		Other		Total	
Club	Season	Division	Apps	Goals	Apps	Goals	Apps	Goals	Apps	Goals	Apps	Goals
Wolverhampton Wanderers U21	2024–25	—			—		—		1 (Note: Appearance(s) in EFL Trophy)	0	1	0
Wolverhampton Wanderers U21	2025–26	—			—		—		3	2	3	2
Wolverhampton Wanderers U21	Total		—		—		—		4	2	4	2
Wolverhampton Wanderers	2024–25	Premier League	1	0	0	0	0	0	—		1	0
Wolverhampton Wanderers	2025–26	Premier League	27	3	3	0	0	0	—		30	3
Wolverhampton Wanderers	Total		28	3	3	0	0	0	—		31	3
Career total			28	3	3	0	0	0	4	2	35	5
