= Farai Hallam =

English association football referee

- Full name: Farai Hallam
- Born: 1993 (age 32–33); England
- Other occupation: National Referees Manager

Domestic
Years	League	Role
2023–	English Football League	referee
2026–	Premier League	referee
Association football career
Youth career
- Years: Team
- 2010–2012: Stevenage

Farai Hallam (born 1993) is an English association football referee in the English Football League (EFL) and Premier League and former player.

== Career ==
Hallam was originally a youth player in Stevenage's academy as a defender. After Stevenage released him aged 18 in 2012, he gained a job at The Football Association (The FA) and qualified as a referee to ensure he remained involved in football. By 2020, Hallam had been appointed as The FA's national referee manager. Hallam move through the ranks of officiating in England, affiliated to the Surrey County Football Association, and made his first officiating appearance in the EFL in 2023. Hallam refereed his first EFL match in 2024.

In January 2026, Hallam made his first Premier League appearance refereeing a match between Manchester City and Wolverhampton Wanderers. During the match, he was asked by the video assistant referee (VAR), Darren England, to review a potential penalty award for Manchester City, which Hallam had denied. Hallam gained recognition for being the first Premier League referee on debut to refuse to overturn his decision when asked to by VAR.

== Personal life ==
Hallam was born to an English father of Italian descent and a Zimbabwean mother in England. He had stated as a player that he had a desire to represent the Zimbabwe national football team.
