= Jerome Abbey =

English footballer (born 2009)

Personal information
- Date of birth: 16 September 2009 (age 17)
- Place of birth: England
- Position: Defensive midfielder

Team information
- Current team: Wolverhampton Wanderers
- Number: 50

Youth career
- Wolverhampton Wanderers

Senior career*
Years	Team	Apps	(Gls)
2026–	Wolverhampton Wanderers	1	(0)

International career^{‡}
2025	England U17	2	(0)
- * Club domestic league appearances and goals as of 23:16, 9 May 2026 (UTC) ‡ National team caps and goals as of 20:15, 2 May 2026 (UTC)

Jerome Abbey (born 16 September 2009) is an English professional footballer who plays as a defensive midfielder for EFL Championship club Wolverhampton Wanderers.

== Club career ==
A youth product of Wolverhampton Wanderers, Abbey was pulled out from school a Premier League match against Bournemouth in February 2026. He made his senior and professional debut with Wolves as substitute in a 1–1 Premier League tie with Burnley on 24 May 2026, becoming their youngest ever debutant in the league at 16 years, eight months and eight days old.

== International career ==
Abbey was born in England to Ghanaian-Dutch parents, and holds dual English and Dutch descent. In November 2025, he was called up to the England U17s for a set of friendlies.

== Personal life ==
Abbey's two older brothers, Jed and Jez, are also footballers who came through Wolverhampton Wanderers' academy. Jed currently plays for Matlock Town and Jez currently plays for Alvechurch.

Abbey also has a twin brother, Jeyden, who currently plays for Shrewsbury Town youth set-up.
