= 2018–19 Wolverhampton Wanderers F.C. season =

English football club season

Wolverhampton Wanderers
2018–19 season
- Chairman: Jeff Shi
- Head coach: Nuno Espírito Santo
- Stadium: Molineux
- Premier League: 7th
- FA Cup: Semi-finals
- EFL Cup: Third round
- Top goalscorer: League: Raúl Jiménez (13); All: Raúl Jiménez (17)
- Highest home attendance: 31,436 (vs Arsenal, 24 April 2019, Premier League)
- Lowest home attendance: 21,562 (vs Leicester City, 25 September 2018, EFL Cup)
- Average home league attendance: 31,030
Home colours	Away colours

The 2018–19 season was the 141st in the history of Wolverhampton Wanderers and the 2nd under then-head coach Nuno Espírito Santo. In that season, they returned to the Premier League for the first time since being relegated in 2012 via winning the previous season's EFL Championship. They also reached their first knockout competition semi-final in 21 years through their participation in the FA Cup semi-finals.

The club finished in 7th place, their highest position in the English league system since 1979–80 and the highest of any newly promoted team since Ipswich Town finished 5th in the 2000–01 season. As a result of Manchester City winning all 3 domestic trophies on offer that season, this league position gained them a place in the UEFA Europa League second qualifying round, invoking the club's first continental participation since the 1980–81 season.

== Pre-season friendlies ==
7 July 2018 Friendly	Neuchâtel Xamax (Switzerland)	1–1	(England) Wolverhampton Wanderers	Port-Valais, Switzerland
19:00 CEST	Nuzzolo 8' (pen.)	Report	Hause 70'	Stadium: Union Sportive de Port-Valais

10 July 2018 Uhrencup	Basel (Switzerland)	1–2	(England) Wolverhampton Wanderers	Biel, Switzerland
18:00 CEST	Van Wolfswinkel 9'	Report	Mir 17'; Jota 51'	Stadium: Tissot Arena; Attendance: 1,724; Referee: Urs Schnyder

14 July 2018 Uhrencup	Young Boys (Switzerland)	0–4	(England) Wolverhampton Wanderers	Bern, Switzerland
15:00 CEST		Report	Cavaleiro 26'; Costa 30'; Bonatini 54'; Mir 89'	Stadium: Stadion Neufeld; Attendance: 3,467

19 July 2018 Friendly	Wolverhampton Wanderers (England)	1–1	(Netherlands) Ajax	Walsall
14:00 BST	Neves 74' (pen.)	Report	Van de Beek 45'	Stadium: Banks's Stadium; Attendance: 3,328; Referee: Oliver Langford

22 July 2018 H-Hotels Cup	VfL Bochum (Germany)	0–0 (5–4 p)	(England) Wolverhampton Wanderers	Bochum, Germany
15:00 CEST		Report		Stadium: Vonovia Ruhrstadion; Referee: Bastian Börner
	Penalties
	Hoogland (penalty scored); Tesche (penalty missed); Celozzi (penalty scored); Hinterseer (penalty missed); Soares (penalty scored); Sağlam (penalty scored); Weilandt (penalty scored)		(penalty scored) Neves; (penalty missed) Jiménez; (penalty missed) Coady; (penalty scored) Jota; (penalty scored) Gonçalves; (penalty scored) Enobakhare; (penalty missed) Giles
Note: One single 45-minute fixture with no half-time. As the match ended in a draw, a penalty shoot-out took place to determine a winner.

22 July 2018 H-Hotels Cup 3rd place P/O	Real Betis (Spain)	0–0	(England) Wolverhampton Wanderers	Bochum, Germany
16:00 CEST		Report		Stadium: Vonovia Ruhrstadion; Referee: Mitja Steegemann
Note: One single 45-minute fixture with no half-time. A penalty shoot-out was scheduled to take place in the event of a draw but this was cancelled.

25 July 2018 Friendly	Stoke City	0–0	Wolverhampton Wanderers	Stoke-on-Trent
19:45 BST		Report		Stadium: bet365 Stadium; Attendance: 9,122 (2,078 away); Referee: Steve Martin

28 July 2018 Friendly	Derby County	2–1	Wolverhampton Wanderers	Derby
15:00 BST	Nugent 41'; Mount 72'	Report	Jota 67'	Stadium: Pride Park; Attendance: 7,676 (2,314 away); Referee: Peter Bankes

4 August 2018 Friendly	Wolverhampton Wanderers (England)	2–1	(Spain) Villarreal	Wolverhampton
15:00 BST	Boly 49'; Jiménez 55'	Report	Gerard 18'	Stadium: Molineux; Attendance: 19,062; Referee: Lee Probert

== Competitions ==
=== Premier League ===
A total of 20 teams competed in the Premier League in the 2018–19 season. Each team played every other team twice, once at their stadium, and once at the opposition's. Three points were awarded to teams for each win, one point per draw, and none for defeats.

==== League table ====
Pos	Team	Pld	W	D	L	GF	GA	GD	Pts	Qualification or relegation
5	Arsenal	38	21	7	10	73	51	+22	70	Qualification to Europa League group stage (Note: Since the winners of the EFL Cup and the FA Cup, Manchester City, qualified for the Champions League, the spot given to the FA Cup winners (Europa League group stage) was passed to the sixth-placed team and the spot given to the League Cup winners (Europa League second qualifying round) was passed to the seventh-placed team.)
6	Manchester United	38	19	9	10	65	54	+11	66	Qualification to Europa League group stage
7	Wolverhampton Wanderers	38	16	9	13	47	46	+1	57	Qualification to Europa League second qualifying round
8	Everton	38	15	9	14	54	46	+8	54	
9	Leicester City	38	15	7	16	51	48	+3	52	

Source: Premier League
Rules for classification: 1) Points; 2) Goal difference; 3) Goals scored; 4) Play-offs (only if needed to decide champion, teams for relegation or teams for UEFA competitions).

==== Results summary ====
Overall								Home						Away					
Pld	W	D	L	GF	GA	GD	Pts	W	D	L	GF	GA	GD	W	D	L	GF	GA	GD
38	16	9	13	47	46	+1	57	10	4	5	28	21	+7	6	5	8	19	25	−6

Last updated: 12 May 2019.
Source: Premier League

==== Results by matchday ====
Matchday	1	2	3	4	5	6	7	8	9	10	11	12	13	14	15	16	17	18	19	20	21	22	23	24	25	26	27	28	29	30	31	32	33	34	35	36	37	38
Ground	H	A	H	A	H	A	H	A	H	A	H	A	H	A	H	A	H	H	A	A	H	A	H	H	A	H	A	A	H	A	A	H	A	H	H	A	H	A
Result	D	L	D	W	W	D	W	W	L	L	L	D	L	L	W	W	W	L	D	W	L	L	W	W	W	D	D	L	W	D	L	W	L	D	W	W	W	L
Position	8	14	14	9	9	10	8	7	9	9	11	11	11	11	12	10	7	10	11	7	9	11	8	7	7	7	8	7	7	7	7	8	8	8	7	7	7	7

Updated to match(es) played on 12 May 2019. Source: Statto.com
A = Away; H = Home; W = Win; D = Draw; L = Loss

==== Results ====
The provisional fixture list was released on 14 June 2018, but was subject to change in the event of matches being selected for television coverage or police concerns.

11 August 2018 1	Wolverhampton Wanderers	2–2	Everton	Wolverhampton
17:30 BST	Neves 44'; Jiménez 80'	Report	Richarlison (yellow card) 14', (goal) 17', 67'; Jagielka (red card) 40'	Stadium: Molineux; Attendance: 31,231 (2,970 away fans); Referee: Craig Pawson

18 August 2018 2	Leicester City	2–0	Wolverhampton Wanderers	Leicester
15:00 BST	Doherty 29' (o.g.); Maddison 45'; Vardy (red card) 66'; Evans (yellow card) 78'; Maguire (yellow card) 90+6'	Report	Gibbs-White (yellow card) 74'	Stadium: King Power Stadium; Attendance: 32,043 (3,305 away fans); Referee: Mike Dean

25 August 2018 3	Wolverhampton Wanderers	1–1	Manchester City	Wolverhampton
12:30 BST	Coady (yellow card) 41'; Boly 57'	Report	Kompany (yellow card) 12'; D. Silva (yellow card) 60'; Laporte 69'	Stadium: Molineux; Attendance: 31,322 (2,970 away fans); Referee: Martin Atkinson

1 September 2018 4	West Ham United	0–1	Wolverhampton Wanderers	London
15:00 BST	Fredericks (yellow card) 24'; Cresswell (yellow card) 60'	Report	Bennett (yellow card) 79'; Traoré 90+3'	Stadium: London Stadium; Attendance: 56,947 (3,000 away fans); Referee: Chris Kavanagh

16 September 2018 5	Wolverhampton Wanderers	1–0	Burnley	Wolverhampton
13:30 BST	Jiménez 61'; Jota (yellow card) 72'; Neves (yellow card) 86'	Report	Bardsley (yellow card) 28'; Cork (yellow card) 37'; Guðmundsson (yellow card) 68'; Taylor (yellow card) 82'	Stadium: Molineux; Attendance: 30,406 (1,329 away fans); Referee: Andre Marriner

22 September 2018 6	Manchester United	1–1	Wolverhampton Wanderers	Manchester
15:00 BST	Fred 18'; Shaw (yellow card) 40'	Report	Moutinho 53'; Neves (yellow card) 61'	Stadium: Old Trafford; Attendance: 74,489 (3,129 away fans); Referee: Kevin Friend

29 September 2018 7	Wolverhampton Wanderers	2–0	Southampton	Wolverhampton
15:00 BST	Jota (yellow card) 51'; Jonny (yellow card) 57', (goal) 87'; Traoré (yellow card) 74'; Cavaleiro 79'	Report	Bertrand (yellow card) 50'	Stadium: Molineux; Attendance: 31,147 (2,970 away fans); Referee: Stuart Attwell

6 October 2018 8	Crystal Palace	0–1	Wolverhampton Wanderers	Selhurst
15:00 BST	McArthur (yellow card) 30'; Kouyaté (yellow card) 88'; Van Aanholt (yellow card) 90+1'	Report	Doherty 56'; Coady (yellow card) 78'; Jonny (yellow card) 88'; Cavaleiro (yellow card) 90+1'; Moutinho (yellow card) 90+4'	Stadium: Selhurst Park; Attendance: 25,715 (3,027 away fans); Referee: Michael Oliver

20 October 2018 9	Wolverhampton Wanderers	0–2	Watford	Wolverhampton
15:00 BST	Neves (yellow card) 35'; Jota (yellow card) 73'; Bennett (yellow card) 90+1'	Report	Capoue 20'; Pereyra 21'; Hughes (yellow card) 69'	Stadium: Molineux; Attendance: 31,144 (2,731 away fans); Referee: Lee Mason

27 October 2018 10	Brighton & Hove Albion	1–0	Wolverhampton Wanderers	Falmer
15:00 BST	Murray 48'; Kayal (yellow card) 52'; Dunk (yellow card) 77'; Knockaert (yellow card) 90'	Report		Stadium: Falmer Stadium; Attendance: 30,654 (2,992 away fans); Referee: Anthony Taylor

3 November 2018 11	Wolverhampton Wanderers	2–3	Tottenham Hotspur	Wolverhampton
19:45 GMT	Bennett (yellow card) 24'; Neves 68' (pen.); Jiménez 79' (pen.)	Report	Lamela 27'; Lucas 30'; Kane 61'; Foyth (yellow card) 78'; Winks (yellow card) 87'	Stadium: Molineux; Attendance: 31,185 (2,938 away fans); Referee: Mike Dean

11 November 2018 12	Arsenal	1–1	Wolverhampton Wanderers	Holloway
16:30 GMT	Özil (yellow card) 69'; Bellerín (yellow card) 78'; Mkhitaryan 86'	Report	Cavaleiro 13'; Doherty (yellow card) 71'; Costa (yellow card) 74'	Stadium: Emirates Stadium; Attendance: 60,030 (3,003 away fans); Referee: Stuart Attwell

25 November 2018 13	Wolverhampton Wanderers	0–2	Huddersfield Town	Wolverhampton
16:00 GMT	Neves (yellow card) 87'	Report	Mooy 6', 74'; Smith (yellow card) 17'; Hogg (yellow card) 60'	Stadium: Molineux; Attendance: 30,130 (1,838 away fans); Referee: Kevin Friend

30 November 2018 14	Cardiff City	2–1	Wolverhampton Wanderers	Cardiff
20:00 GMT	Gunnarsson 65'; Paterson (yellow card) 71'; Hoilett 77'	Report	Doherty 18'; Neves (yellow card) 61'; Saïss (yellow card) 66'	Stadium: Cardiff City Stadium; Attendance: 30,213 (2,996 away fans); Referee: Andre Marriner

5 December 2018 15	Wolverhampton Wanderers	2–1	Chelsea	Wolverhampton
19:45 GMT	Saïss (yellow card) 37'; Moutinho (yellow card) 54'; Jiménez 59'; Coady (yellow card) 61'; Jota 63'; Vinagre (yellow card) 68'	Report	Loftus-Cheek 18'; Fàbregas (yellow card) 64'; Giroud (yellow card) 86'; Alonso (yellow card) 90+1'; Christensen (yellow card) 90+4'	Stadium: Molineux; Attendance: 31,300 (2,967 away fans); Referee: Jon Moss

9 December 2018 16	Newcastle United	1–2	Wolverhampton Wanderers	Newcastle upon Tyne
16:00 GMT	Ki Sung-yueng (yellow card) 18'; Pérez 23'; Yedlin (red card) 57'; Clark (yellow card) 90+6'	Report	Jota 17', (yellow card) 73'; Doherty (yellow card) 33', (goal) 90+4'; Costa (yellow card) 65'; Coady (yellow card) 72'; Bennett (yellow card) 80'	Stadium: St James' Park; Attendance: 50,223 (3,183 away fans); Referee: Mike Dean

15 December 2018 17	Wolverhampton Wanderers	2–0	Bournemouth	Wolverhampton
15:00 GMT	Jiménez 12'; Costa (yellow card) 66'; Cavaleiro 90+4'	Report	S. Cook (yellow card) 34'; Lerma (yellow card) 39'	Stadium: Molineux; Attendance: 30,997 (1,785 away fans); Referee: Simon Hooper

21 December 2018 18	Wolverhampton Wanderers	0–2	Liverpool	Wolverhampton
20:00 GMT		Report	Salah 18'; Van Dijk 68'	Stadium: Molineux; Attendance: 31,358 (2,970 away fans); Referee: Craig Pawson

26 December 2018 19	Fulham	1–1	Wolverhampton Wanderers	London
12:30 GMT	Chambers (yellow card) 44'; Christie (yellow card) 45'; Sessegnon 74'	Report	Saïss (yellow card) 44', (goal) 85'	Stadium: Craven Cottage; Attendance: 24,382 (2,664 away fans); Referee: Andre Marriner

29 December 2018 20	Tottenham Hotspur	1–3	Wolverhampton Wanderers	London
15:00 GMT	Davies (yellow card) 16'; Kane 22', (yellow card) 81'; Eriksen (yellow card) 42'	Report	Boly 72'; Jonny (yellow card) 81'; Jiménez 83', (yellow card) 84'; Costa 87'	Stadium: Wembley; Attendance: 46,356 (3,158 away fans); Referee: Stuart Attwell

2 January 2019 21	Wolverhampton Wanderers	0–2	Crystal Palace	Wolverhampton
19:45 GMT	Boly (yellow card) 23'; Saïss (yellow card) 45+1'; Bennett (yellow card) 54'; Jonny (yellow card) 90+1'	Report	Milivojević (yellow card) 62', (goal) 90+5' (pen.); J. Ayew 83'	Stadium: Molineux; Attendance: 30,666 (1,457 away fans); Referee: Roger East

14 January 2019 22	Manchester City	3–0	Wolverhampton Wanderers	Manchester
20:00 GMT	Gabriel Jesus 10', 39' (pen.); Fernandinho (yellow card) 14'; Coady 78' (o.g.)	Report	Boly (red card) 19'	Stadium: Etihad Stadium; Attendance: 54,171 (3,000 away fans); Referee: Craig Pawson

19 January 2019 23	Wolverhampton Wanderers	4–3	Leicester City	Wolverhampton
12:30 GMT	Jota 4', 64', 90+3', (yellow card) 45+2'; Bennett 12', (yellow card) 44'; Jonny (yellow card) 86'	Report	Mendy (yellow card) 2'; Pereira (yellow card) 45+1'; Gray 47'; Coady 51' (o.g.); Ndidi (yellow card) 58'; Morgan 87'	Stadium: Molineux; Attendance: 31,278 (2,970 away fans); Referee: Chris Kavanagh

29 January 2019 24	Wolverhampton Wanderers	3–0	West Ham United	Wolverhampton
19:45 GMT	Saïss (yellow card) 32', (goal) 66'; Neves (yellow card) 70'; Bennett (yellow card) 73'; Jiménez 80', 86', (yellow card) 86'	Report	Snodgrass (yellow card) 37'	Stadium: Molineux; Attendance: 31,122 (2,877 away fans); Referee: David Coote

2 February 2019 25	Everton	1–3	Wolverhampton Wanderers	Liverpool
15:00 GMT	Zouma (yellow card) 16'; Gomes 27'; Keane (yellow card) 44'; Davies (yellow card) 76'	Report	Neves 7' (pen.); Jiménez 45'; Coady (yellow card) 56'; Dendoncker 66'	Stadium: Goodison Park; Attendance: 39,380 (2,972 away fans); Referee: Lee Mason

11 February 2019 26	Wolverhampton Wanderers	1–1	Newcastle United	Wolverhampton
20:00 GMT	Jota (yellow card) 51'; Boly 90+5'	Report	Ritchie (yellow card) 44'; Schär (yellow card) 51'; Hayden 56'; Lascelles (yellow card) 68'	Stadium: Molineux; Attendance: 30,687 (2,402 away fans); Referee: Graham Scott

23 February 2019 27	Bournemouth	1–1	Wolverhampton Wanderers	Bournemouth
15:00 GMT	Smith (yellow card) 1'; King 14' (pen.) (penalty missed) 85'; Lerma (yellow card) 70'; Gosling (yellow card) 90+4'; Boruc (yellow card) 90+5'	Report	Jota (yellow card) 21'; Dendoncker (yellow card) 42'; Bennett (yellow card) 57'; Jiménez (yellow card) 77', (goal) 83' (pen.); Neves (yellow card) 85'	Stadium: Vitality Stadium; Attendance: 10,671 (1,295 away fans); Referee: Roger East

26 February 2019 28	Huddersfield Town	1–0	Wolverhampton Wanderers	Huddersfield
19:45 GMT	Billing (yellow card) 29'; Hogg (yellow card) 84'; Mounié 90+1'	Report	Bennett (yellow card) 43'; Doherty (yellow card) 89'	Stadium: John Smith's Stadium; Attendance: 22,714 (2,323 away fans); Referee: David Coote

2 March 2019 29	Wolverhampton Wanderers	2–0	Cardiff City	Wolverhampton
15:00 GMT	Jota 16'; Jiménez 18'; Bennett (yellow card) 34'	Report	Bamba (yellow card) 45+1'; Peltier (yellow card) 62'	Stadium: Molineux; Attendance: 31,309 (2,968 away fans); Referee: Andre Marriner

10 March 2019 30	Chelsea	1–1	Wolverhampton Wanderers	London
14:05 GMT	Rüdiger (yellow card) 78'; Hazard 90+2'	Report	Doherty (yellow card) 37'; Jiménez 56'; Saïss (yellow card) 66'; Boly (yellow card) 75'; Jota (yellow card) 80'	Stadium: Stamford Bridge; Attendance: 40,692 (3,084 away fans); Referee: Michael Oliver

30 March 2019 31	Burnley	2–0	Wolverhampton Wanderers	Burnley
15:00 GMT	Coady 2' (o.g.); McNeil (yellow card) 67', (goal) 77'	Report	Neves (yellow card) 90+3'	Stadium: Turf Moor; Attendance: 20,990 (2,419 away fans); Referee: Chris Kavanagh

2 April 2019 32	Wolverhampton Wanderers	2–1	Manchester United	Wolverhampton
19:45 BST	Jota 25'; Smalling 77' (o.g.); Jonny (yellow card) 90+4'	Report	McTominay 13'; Shaw (yellow card) 38'; Dalot (yellow card) 42'; Young (yellow card) 52' (yellow-red card) 57'	Stadium: Molineux; Attendance: 31,302 (2,961 away fans); Referee: Mike Dean

13 April 2019 33	Southampton	3–1	Wolverhampton Wanderers	Southampton
15:00 BST	Redmond 2', 30'; Bertrand (yellow card) 67'; Long 71'	Report	Boly 28'; Moutinho (yellow card) 40'; Jiménez (yellow card) 45+2'; Saïss (yellow card) 74'	Stadium: St. Mary's; Attendance: 31,708 (3,262 away fans); Referee: Jon Moss

20 April 2019 34	Wolverhampton Wanderers	0–0	Brighton & Hove Albion	Wolverhampton
15:00 BST		Report	Stephens (yellow card) 32'	Stadium: Molineux; Attendance: 31,096 (2,748 away fans); Referee: Craig Pawson

24 April 2019 35	Wolverhampton Wanderers	3–1	Arsenal	Wolverhampton
19:45 BST	Doherty (yellow card) 17', (goal) 37'; Neves 28'; Jota 45+2'; Bennett (yellow card) 84'	Report	Monreal (yellow card) 27'; Xhaka (yellow card) 31'; Torreira (yellow card) 45'; Papastathopoulos 80'	Stadium: Molineux; Attendance: 31,436 (2,958 away fans); Referee: Stuart Attwell

27 April 2019 36	Watford	1–2	Wolverhampton Wanderers	Watford
15:00 BST	Gray 49'; Holebas (yellow card) 62'; Success (yellow card) 85'; Capoue (yellow card) 90+6'	Report	Jiménez 41'; Moutinho (yellow card) 61'; Jota 77', (yellow card) 84'	Stadium: Vicarage Road; Attendance: 20,323 (2,102 away fans); Referee: Simon Hooper

4 May 2019 37	Wolverhampton Wanderers	1–0	Fulham	Wolverhampton
15:00 BST	Jota (yellow card) 7'; Dendoncker 75'	Report	Chambers (yellow card) 22'; Le Marchand (yellow card) 32'; Christie (yellow card) 73'	Stadium: Molineux; Attendance: 30,456 (1,080 away fans); Referee: Jon Moss

12 May 2019 38	Liverpool	2–0	Wolverhampton Wanderers	Liverpool
15:00 BST	Mané 17', 81'	Report	Bennett (yellow card) 49'; Jota (yellow card) 50'	Stadium: Anfield; Attendance: 53,331 (2,936 away fans); Referee: Martin Atkinson

=== FA Cup ===
The third round draw was made live on the BBC by Ruud Gullit and Paul Ince from Stamford Bridge on 3 December. The fourth round draw was made live on the BBC by Robbie Keane and Carl Ikeme following Wolves' third round victory on 7 January. The fifth round draw was made live on the BBC by Ian Wright and Alex Scott on 28 January. The draw for the quarter-final was made on 18 February by Darren Fletcher and Wayne Bridge. The draw for the semi-finals was made live on the BBC on 17 March by Jimmy Floyd Hasselbaink and Leon Osman.

7 January 2019 Third round	Wolverhampton Wanderers	2–1	Liverpool	Wolverhampton
19:45 GMT	Jiménez 38'; Neves 55'	Report	Milner (yellow card) 15'; Origi 51'	Stadium: Molineux; Attendance: 25,849 (4,774 away fans); Referee: Paul Tierney

26 January 2019 Fourth round	Shrewsbury Town	2–2	Wolverhampton Wanderers	Shrewsbury
15:00 GMT	Sadler (yellow card) 44'; Docherty 47', (yellow card) 62'; Grant (yellow card) 63'; Waterfall 71'	Report	Jiménez 75'; Doherty 90+3'	Stadium: Montgomery Waters Meadow; Attendance: 9,503 (1,641 away fans); Referee: Roger East

5 February 2019 Fourth round replay	Wolverhampton Wanderers	3–2	Shrewsbury Town	Wolverhampton
19:45 GMT	Doherty 2', 45+6'; Cavaleiro 62'	Report	Bolton 11'; Norburn (yellow card) 35'; Laurent 39'	Stadium: Molineux; Attendance: 28,844 (3,131 away fans); Referee: Lee Probert

17 February 2019 Fifth round	Bristol City	0–1	Wolverhampton Wanderers	Bristol
13:00 GMT	Wright (yellow card) 52'; Kalas (yellow card) 75'	Report	Cavaleiro 28'; Moutinho (yellow card) 83'; Gibbs-White (yellow card) 86'	Stadium: Ashton Gate; Attendance: 24,394 (3,407 away fans); Referee: Martin Atkinson

16 March 2019 Quarter-finals	Wolverhampton Wanderers	2–1	Manchester United	Wolverhampton
19:55 GMT	Boly (yellow card) 41'; Neves (yellow card) 43'; Jiménez 70'; Jota 76'; Coady (yellow card) 86'	Report	Matić (yellow card) 45+1'; Rashford (yellow card) 52', (goal) 90+5'; Herrera (yellow card) 62'; Lindelöf (yellow card) 84'; Dalot (yellow card) 90+4'	Stadium: Molineux; Attendance: 31,004 (4,685 away fans); Referee: Martin Atkinson

7 April 2019 Semi-finals	Watford	3–2 (a.e.t.)	Wolverhampton Wanderers	London
16:00 BST	Cathcart (yellow card) 54'; Holebas (yellow card) 61'; Deulofeu 79', 104'; Deeney 90+4' (pen.); Capoue (yellow card) 101'	Report	Saïss (yellow card) 10'; Neves (yellow card) 25'; Doherty 36'; Jiménez 62'	Stadium: Wembley; Attendance: 80,092 (34,645 Wolves); Referee: Michael Oliver

=== EFL Cup ===
The second round draw was made from the Stadium of Light on 16 August. The third round draw was made on 30 August 2018 by David Seaman and Joleon Lescott.

28 August 2018 Second round	Sheffield Wednesday	0–2	Wolverhampton Wanderers	Sheffield
19:45 BST	Baker (yellow card) 51'; Nielsen (yellow card) 62'	Report	Bonatini 53'; Costa 85' (pen.)	Stadium: Hillsborough; Attendance: 13,597 (2,945 away fans); Referee: Robert Jones

25 September 2018 Third round	Wolverhampton Wanderers	0–0 (1–3 p)	Leicester City	Wolverhampton
19:45 BST	Jota (yellow card) 67'	Report	Evans (yellow card) 43'; Morgan (yellow card) 77'	Stadium: Molineux; Attendance: 21,562 (2,349 away fans); Referee: Paul Tierney
	Penalties
	Saïss (penalty missed); Jota (penalty missed); Ashley-Seal (penalty scored); Traoré (penalty missed)		(penalty missed) Fuchs; (penalty scored) Ghezzal; (penalty missed) Choudhury; (penalty scored) Iborra; (penalty scored) Iheanacho

=== EFL Trophy ===
Wolves were one of the sixteen teams from outside the bottom two divisions of the Football League to be invited to field their academy team in the competition due to it holding Category 1 academy status. They were drawn into Group H in the Northern section. In matches level at the end of 90 minutes, a penalty shoot-out was held with the winner earning a bonus point.

4 September 2018 Grp. H (N)	Scunthorpe United	0–0 (4–2 p)	Wolverhampton Wanderers U23	Scunthorpe
19:45 BST		Report		Stadium: Glanford Park; Attendance: 874; Referee: Thomas Bramall
	Penalties
	Goode (penalty missed); Lund (penalty scored); Colclough (penalty scored); Horsfield (penalty scored); Burgess (penalty scored)		(penalty missed) Gonçalves; (penalty missed) Diallo; (penalty scored) Ennis; (penalty scored) Kilman

9 October 2018 Grp. H (N)	Mansfield Town	2–1	Wolverhampton Wanderers U23	Mansfield
19:45 BST	Mellis 4'; Benning 47'	Report	Gonçalves 75'	Stadium: One Call Stadium; Attendance: 1,112; Referee: Tom Nield

6 November 2018 Grp. H (N)	Lincoln City	2–2 (4–5 p)	Wolverhampton Wanderers U23	Lincoln
19:45 GMT	Green 23', 42'	Report	Ashley-Seal 39'; Giles 45+4'	Stadium: Sincil Bank; Attendance: 2,723; Referee: Trevor Kettle
	Penalties
	Akinde (penalty scored); Rhead (penalty scored); Toffolo (penalty scored); Mensah (penalty missed); Andrade (penalty scored); Pett (penalty missed)		(penalty scored) Watt; (penalty scored) Gonçalves; (penalty missed) Giles; (penalty scored) Ashley-Seal; (penalty scored) Ennis; (penalty scored) Iorfa

Group table

Pos	Lge	Team	Pld	W	PW	PL	L	GF	GA	GD	Pts	Qualification
1	L2	Mansfield Town	3	3	0	0	0	7	4	+3	9	Round 2
2	L2	Lincoln City	3	0	1	1	1	4	5	−1	3	Round 2
3	L1	Scunthorpe United	3	0	1	1	1	3	4	−1	3	
4	ACA	Wolverhampton Wanderers U21	3	0	1	1	1	3	4	−1	3	

Source: EFL.com

== Players ==
=== First team squad ===
As of 31 August 2018

Squad No.	Name	Nationality	Position(s)	Date of birth (age)	Signed From	Year signed
Goalkeepers
11	Rui Patrício	(Portugal)	GK	15 February 1988 (aged 30)	(Portugal) Sporting CP	2018
21	John Ruddy ^{HG}	(England)	GK	24 October 1986 (aged 31)	(England) Norwich City	2017
31	Will Norris ^{HG}	(England)	GK	12 August 1993 (aged 25)	(England) Cambridge United	2017
Defenders
2	Matt Doherty ^{HG}	(Republic of Ireland)	RWB	16 January 1992 (aged 26)	(Republic of Ireland) Bohemians	2010
5	Ryan Bennett ^{HG}	(England)	CB	6 March 1990 (aged 28)	(England) Norwich City	
15	Willy Boly	(France) (Ivory Coast)	CB	3 February 1991 (aged 27)	(Portugal) Porto	2018
16	Conor Coady ^{HG}	(England)	CB	25 February 1993 (aged 25)	(England) Huddersfield Town	2015
19	Jonny	(Spain)	LWB/RWB	3 March 1994 (aged 24)	(Spain) Atlético Madrid (Loan)	2018 (Loan)
29	Rúben Vinagre ^{U21}	(Portugal)	LWB	9 April 1999 (aged 19)	(France) Monaco	2018
30	Kortney Hause ^{HG}	(England) (Bermuda)	CB	16 July 1995 (aged 23)	(England) Wycombe Wanderers	2014
47	Cameron John ^{HG}	(England)	CB	24 August 1999 (aged 19)	Academy	2019
49	Max Kilman ^{HG}	(England) (Ukraine)	CB	23 May 1997 (aged 21)	Academy	2019
—	Ethan Ebanks-Landell ^{HG}	(England) (Jamaica)	CB	16 December 1992 (aged 25)	Academy	2010
Midfielders
8	Rúben Neves	(Portugal)	CM	13 March 1997 (aged 21)	(Portugal) Porto	2017
17	Morgan Gibbs-White ^{HG} ^{U21}	(England)	CM/ST	27 January 2000 (aged 18)	Academy	2017
23	Ryan Giles ^{HG} ^{U21}	(England)	LM	26 January 2000 (aged 18)	Academy	2018
25	Elliot Watt ^{U21}	(Scotland) (England)	CM	11 March 2000 (aged 18)	Academy	2018
26	Pedro Gonçalves ^{U21}	(Portugal)	CM	28 June 1998 (aged 20)	Academy	2018
27	Romain Saïss	(Morocco) (France)	CM/CB	26 March 1990 (aged 28)	(France) Angers	2016
28	João Moutinho	(Portugal)	CM	8 September 1986 (aged 31)	(France) Monaco	2018
32	Leander Dendoncker	(Belgium)	DM/CB	15 April 1995 (aged 23)	(Belgium) Anderlecht (Loan)	2018 (Loan)
Forwards
7	Ivan Cavaleiro	(Portugal) (Cape Verde)	RW/LW/ST	18 October 1993 (aged 24)	(France) Monaco	2016
9	Raúl Jiménez	(Mexico)	ST	5 May 1991 (aged 27)	(Portugal) Benfica (Loan)	2018 (Loan)
10	Hélder Costa	(Portugal) (Angola)	LW/RW	12 January 1994 (aged 24)	(Portugal) Benfica	2017
14	Bright Enobakhare	(Nigeria) (England)	LW/RW	8 February 1998 (aged 20)	Academy	2015
18	Diogo Jota	(Portugal)	LW/ST	4 December 1996 (aged 21)	(Spain) Atlético Madrid	2018
24	Benny Ashley-Seal ^{U21}	(England)	ST	21 November 1998 (aged 19)	Academy	2018
33	Léo Bonatini	(Brazil) (Italy)	ST	28 March 1994 (aged 24)	(Saudi Arabia) Al-Hilal	2018
37	Adama Traoré	(Spain) (Mali)	RW/ST	25 January 1996 (aged 22)	(England) Middlesbrough	2018
45	Niall Ennis ^{HG} ^{U21}	(England) (Jamaica)	ST	20 May 1999 (aged 19)	Academy	2013

- HG = Homegrown Player
- U21 = Under-21 Player (born on or after 1 January 1997)
- Players in italics out on loan during the season

=== Statistics ===
Key:
‡ On loan from another club * First appearance(s) for the club

- # = Squad number
- Pos = Playing position
- P = Number of games played
- G = Number of goals scored
- GK = Goalkeeper
- DF = Defender
- MF = Midfielder
- FW = Forward
- = Yellow cards
- = Red cards
- † Permanent player left club during the season
- ¤ Loaned to another club for part or all of season

Correct as of end of the season. Starting appearances are listed first, followed by substitute appearances in parentheses where applicable.

No.	Pos	Name	P	G	P	G	P	G	P	G	A yellow card	A red card	Notes
No.	Pos	Name	League		FA Cup		League Cup		Total		Discipline		Notes
2	DF	(Republic of Ireland) Matt Doherty	35(3)	4	5(1)	4	1	0	41(4)	8	5	0	
5	DF	(England) Ryan Bennett	34	1	4	0	0(2)	0	38(2)	1	12	0	(Note: Bennett was suspended vs Chelsea (a) and Burnley (a) due to accumulating ten yellow cards.)
6	DF	(England) Danny Batth ¤ †	0	0	0	0	0	0	0	0	0	0	
7	FW	(Portugal) Ivan Cavaleiro	6(17)	3	2(3)	2	1	0	9(20)	5	1	0	
8	MF	(Portugal) Rúben Neves	34(1)	4	4(1)	1	0	0	38(2)	5	10	0	(Note: Neves was suspended vs Chelsea (h) due to accumulating five yellow cards.)
9	FW	(Mexico) Raúl Jiménez ‡	36(2)	13	4(2)	4	0	0	40(4)	17	4	0	
10	MF	(Portugal) Hélder Costa	16(9)	1	2(2)	0	0(1)	1	18(12)	2	3	0	
11	GK	(Portugal) Rui Patrício	37	0	0	0	0	0	37	0	1	0	
14	FW	(Nigeria) Bright Enobakhare ¤	0	0	0	0	0	0	0	0	0	0	
15	DF	(France) Willy Boly	36	4	5	0	0	0	41	4	3	1	(Note: Boly was suspended vs Leicester City (h), Shrewsbury Town (a) and West Ham United (h) due to receiving a red card for violent conduct vs Manchester City (a).)
16	DF	(England) Conor Coady	38	0	6	0	2	0	46	0	6	0	
17	MF	(England) Morgan Gibbs-White	5(21)	0	2(1)	0	2	0	9(22)	0	2	0	
18	FW	(Portugal) Diogo Jota	29(4)	9	3	1	0(1)	0	32(5)	10	12	0	
19	DF	(Spain) Jonny ‡	32(1)	1	5	0	1	0	38(1)	1	6	0	
21	GK	(England) John Ruddy	1	0	6	0	2	0	9	0	0	0	
23	MF	(England) Ryan Giles	0	0	1	0	0	0	1	0	0	0	
24	FW	(England) Benny Ashley-Seal ¤	0	0	0	0	0(2)	0	0(2)	0	0	0	
25	MF	(Scotland) Elliot Watt	0	0	0	0	1	0	1	0	0	0	
26	MF	(Portugal) Pedro Gonçalves	0	0	0	0	0(1)	0	0(1)	0	0	0	
27	MF	(Morocco) Romain Saïss	12(7)	2	5	0	2	0	19(7)	2	8	0	
28	MF	(Portugal) João Moutinho	35(3)	1	4(2)	0	0	0	39(5)	1	5	0	
29	DF	(Portugal) Rúben Vinagre	7(10)	0	1(1)	0	2	0	10(11)	0	1	0	
30	DF	(England) Kortney Hause	0	0	0	0	2	0	2	0	0	0	
31	GK	(England) Will Norris	0(1)	0	0	0	0	0	0(1)	0	0	0	
32	MF	(Belgium) Leander Dendoncker ‡	17(2)	2	5	0	2	0	24(2)	2	1	0	
33	FW	(Brazil) Léo Bonatini	0(7)	0	0	0	2	1	2(7)	1	0	0	
37	FW	(Spain) Adama Traoré	8(21)	1	2(2)	0	2	0	13(23)	1	1	0	
38	MF	(Portugal) Paulinho	0	0	0	0	0	0	0	0	0	0	
45	FW	(England) Niall Ennis	0	0	0(1)	0	0	0	0(1)	0	0	0	
47	DF	(England) Cameron John	0	0	0	0	0	0	0	0	0	0	
49	DF	(England) Max Kilman	0(1)	0	0	0	0	0	0(1)	0	0	0	

=== Awards ===
Award	Winner
Fans' Player of the Season	João Moutinho
Players' Player of the Season	Raúl Jiménez
Young Player of the Season	Rúben Vinagre
Academy Player of the Season	Lewis Richards
Goal of the Season	Diogo Jota (vs Cardiff, 2 March 2019)

== Transfers ==
=== In ===
Date	Player	From	Fee
1 June 2018	(Democratic Republic of the Congo) Benik Afobe	(England) AFC Bournemouth	Undisclosed
1 June 2018	(France) Willy Boly	(Portugal) Porto	Undisclosed
18 June 2018	(Portugal) Rui Patrício	(Portugal) Sporting CP	Compensation (Note: Fee has been agreed at £16,000,000)
1 July 2018	(Brazil) Léo Bonatini	(Saudi Arabia) Al-Hilal	Undisclosed
1 July 2018	(Austria) Pascal Juan Estrada	(Austria) Fußballakademie Linz	Undisclosed
1 July 2018	(Portugal) Diogo Jota	(Spain) Atlético Madrid	Undisclosed
1 July 2018	(Portugal) Rúben Vinagre	(France) Monaco	Undisclosed
1 July 2018	(Spain) Adrián Álvarez	(Spain) San Sebastián de los Reyes	Free
19 July 2018	(Portugal) Paulo Alves	Unattached (Note: Released from Liverpool prior to joining Wolves.)	Free
24 July 2018	(Portugal) João Moutinho	(France) Monaco	Undisclosed
8 August 2018	(Spain) Adama Traoré	(England) Middlesbrough	Undisclosed
1 August 2018	(Canada) Theo Corbeanu	(Canada) Toronto	Free
9 August 2018	(Portugal) João Caiado	(Portugal) Tondela	Undisclosed
9 August 2018	(Norway) John Kitolano	(Norway) Odd	Undisclosed
9 August 2018	(England) Max Kilman	(England) Maidenhead United	Undisclosed
9 August 2018	(England) Jamie Pardington	(England) Rushall Olympic	Undisclosed
9 August 2018	(China) Dongda He	(England) Notts County	Undisclosed
31 August 2018	(England) Sadou Diallo	Unattached (Note: Released from Manchester City prior to joining Wolves.)	Free
1 January 2019	(Spain) David Wang	(Spain) FC Jumilla	Undisclosed
18 January 2019	(England) Michael Agboola	(England) Dagenham & Redbridge	Undisclosed
19 January 2019	(England) Ed Francis	(England) Manchester City	Undisclosed
31 January 2019	(Spain) Jonny	(Spain) Atlético Madrid	Undisclosed

=== Loans in ===
Date from	Player	From	Date until
12 June 2018	(Mexico) Raúl Jiménez	(Portugal) Benfica	End of season
25 July 2018	(Spain) Jonny	(Spain) Atlético Madrid	31 January
9 August 2018	(Belgium) Leander Dendoncker	(Belgium) Anderlecht	End of season (Note: Leander Dendoncker will permanently join Wolves at the end of the season for £12m.)
9 August 2018	(Denmark) Alexander Molberg	(Denmark) Hobro IK	End of season

=== Out ===
Date	Player	To	Fee
14 June 2018	(Haiti) Duckens Nazon	(Belgium) Sint-Truiden	Undisclosed
30 June 2018	(England) Ben Marshall	(England) Norwich City	£1,500,000
12 July 2018	(Republic of the Congo) Prince Oniangué	(France) SM Caen	Undisclosed
27 July 2018	(Nigeria) Carl Ikeme	Retired	
28 July 2018	(Scotland) Barry Douglas	(England) Leeds United	£1,000,000
1 October 2018	(England) Andrew Sealey-Harris	(England) Farnborough	Free transfer
1 January 2019	(Democratic Republic of the Congo) Benik Afobe	(England) Stoke City	Undisclosed (Note: Fee reported as £12,000,000)
29 January 2019	(England) Danny Batth	(England) Stoke City	Undisclosed (Note: Fee reported as £3,000,000, which could rise to £4,000,000)
30 January 2019	(England) Ben Stevenson	(England) Colchester United	Undisclosed
31 January 2019	(England) Dominic Iorfa	(England) Sheffield Wednesday	Undisclosed

=== Loans out ===
Date from	Player	To	Date until
23 May 2018	(Slovakia) Christián Herc	(Slovakia) FC DAC 1904	End of season
7 June 2018	(Wales) Aaron Collins	(England) Colchester United	End of season
12 June 2018	(Democratic Republic of the Congo) Benik Afobe	(England) Stoke City	1 January 2019 (Note: Benik Afobe's move was to become permanent in January 2019)
16 June 2018	(England) Harry Burgoyne	(England) Plymouth Argyle	7 December 2018
22 June 2018	(Netherlands) Sherwin Seedorf	(England) Bradford City	20 January 2019
11 July 2018	(Portugal) Roderick Miranda	(Greece) Olympiacos	End of season
23 July 2018	(Spain) Rafa Mir	(Spain) Las Palmas	End of season
31 July 2018	(England) Ben Goodliffe	(England) Dagenham & Redbridge	1 January 2019
1 August 2018	(England) Aaron Hayden	(England) Stourbridge	End of season
22 August 2018	(France) Sylvain Deslandes	(Spain) FC Jumilla	End of season
22 August 2018	(England) Will Randall	(Spain) FC Jumilla	January 2019
22 August 2018	(Switzerland) Ming-yang Yang	(Spain) FC Jumilla	End of season
22 August 2018	(Wales) Ryan Leak	(Spain) FC Jumilla	End of season
22 August 2018	(England) Aaron Simpson	(Spain) FC Jumilla	January 2019
22 August 2018	(Portugal) Boubacar Hanne	(Spain) FC Jumilla	End of season
22 August 2018	(England) Donovan Wilson	(Spain) FC Jumilla	January 2019
28 August 2018	(England) Jordan Graham	(England) Ipswich Town	2 January 2019
28 August 2018	(Scotland) Jack Ruddy	(Spain) FC Jumilla	End of season
30 August 2018	(England) Ben Stevenson	(Spain) FC Jumilla	30 January 2019
31 August 2018	(Nigeria) Bright Enobakhare	(Scotland) Kilmarnock	1 January 2019
31 August 2018	(Ghana) Phil Ofosu-Ayeh	(Germany) Hansa Rostock	January 2019
31 August 2018	(England) Danny Batth	(England) Middlesbrough	29 January 2019
31 August 2018	(Republic of Ireland) Connor Ronan	(England) Walsall	January 2019
31 August 2018	(England) Connor Johnson	(England) Walsall	End of season
31 August 2018	(Republic of Ireland) Joe Mason	(England) Portsmouth	January 2019
31 August 2018	(Poland) Michał Żyro	(Poland) Pogoń Szczecin	End of season
31 August 2018	(Netherlands) Paul Gladon	(Belgium) Sint-Truiden	January 2019
31 August 2018	(Republic of Ireland) Dan McKenna	(England) Telford United	January 2019
1 January 2019	(Spain) David Wang	(Portugal) Sporting CP	End of season
2 January 2019	(England) Jordan Graham	(England) Oxford United	End of season
7 January 2019	(England) Kortney Hause	(England) Aston Villa	End of season
8 January 2019	(Nigeria) Bright Enobakhare	(England) Coventry City	End of season
11 January 2019	(England) Ethan Ebanks-Landell	(England) Rochdale	End of season
20 January 2019	(Netherlands) Sherwin Seedorf	(Spain) FC Jumilla	End of season
21 January 2019	(England) Harry Burgoyne	(Scotland) Falkirk	End of season
22 January 2019	(England) Benny Ashley-Seal	(Portugal) FC Famalicão	End of season
31 January 2019	(Brazil) Léo Bonatini	(England) Nottingham Forest	End of season
31 January 2019	(Ghana) Phil Ofosu-Ayeh	(Germany) Würzburger Kickers	End of season
31 January 2019	(Republic of Ireland) Connor Ronan	(Slovakia) FC DAC 1904	End of season
31 January 2019	(Scotland) Jack Ruddy	(Spain) S.S. Reyes	End of season
31 January 2019	(England) Donovan Wilson	(England) Exeter City	End of season

=== Loan returns ===
Date	Player	From
30 April 2018	(Scotland) Jack Ruddy	(Scotland) Ayr United
31 May 2018	(Scotland) Daniel Armstrong	(Scotland) Dunfermline
31 May 2018	(Wales) Aaron Collins	(Wales) Newport County
31 May 2018	(France) Sylvain Deslandes	(England) Portsmouth
31 May 2018	(England) Ethan Ebanks-Landell	(England) Milton Keynes Dons
31 May 2018	(England) Dominic Iorfa	(England) Ipswich Town
31 May 2018	(England) Connor Johnson	(England) Telford United
31 May 2018	(England) Ben Marshall	(England) Millwall
31 May 2018	(Republic of Ireland) Daniel McKenna	(Republic of Ireland) Bray Wanderers
31 May 2018	(Haiti) Duckens Nazon	(England) Oldham Athletic
31 May 2018	(Republic of the Congo) Prince Oniangué	(France) Angers
31 May 2018	(Republic of Ireland) Connor Ronan	(England) Portsmouth
31 May 2018	(England) Andrew Sealey-Harris	(England) Farnborough
31 May 2018	(England) Aaron Simpson	(Scotland) Kilmarnock
31 May 2018	(England) Ben Stevenson	(England) Colchester United
31 May 2018	(England) Donovan Wilson	(England) Port Vale
31 May 2018	(Poland) Michał Żyro	(England) Charlton Athletic
30 June 2018	(Netherlands) Paul Gladon	(Netherlands) Heracles Almelo
13 July 2018	(Republic of Ireland) Joe Mason	(United States) Colorado Rapids

=== Released ===
As of 30 January 2019.

Date	Player	Subsequent club	Fee
30 June 2018	(Scotland) Jordan Allan	(Scotland) Cowdenbeath	Released
30 June 2018	(Scotland) Daniel Armstrong	(Scotland) Raith Rovers	Released
30 June 2018	(England) Harry Beasley	(United States) Elon Phoenix	Released
30 June 2018	(England) Tom Bexton	(England) Whitley Bay	Released
30 June 2018	(Republic of Ireland) Anthony Breslin	(Republic of Ireland) Longford Town	Released
30 June 2018	(Northern Ireland) Rory Brown	(Northern Ireland) Institute	Released
30 June 2018	(Romania) Nicolae Cârnaț	(Romania) Dunărea Călărași	Released
30 June 2018	(England) Brad Carr	(England) Eccleshall	Released
30 June 2018	(England) Kieran Feeney	(England) Barnsley	Released
30 June 2018	(Scotland) Ross Finnie	(United States) Georgia State Panthers	Released
30 June 2018	(England) Jonathan Flatt	(England) Scunthorpe United	Released
30 June 2018	(England) Joshua Hesson	(England) Sunderland	Released
30 June 2018	(Republic of Ireland) Conor Levingston	(Republic of Ireland) Bohemians	Released
30 June 2018	(England) Dominic Moan	(England) Sunderland RCA	Released
30 June 2018	(England) Hakeem Odoffin	(England) Northampton Town	Released
30 June 2018	(England) Adam Osbourne	(England) Worcester City	Released
30 June 2018	(Republic of Ireland) Ryan Rainey	(Republic of Ireland) Bonagee United	Released
30 June 2018	(England) Akeal Rehman	(Scotland) Motherwell	Released
30 June 2018	(Portugal) Tomás Reymão	(Portugal) Belenenses SAD	Released
30 June 2018	(England) Joel Whittingham	(Wales) Port Talbot Town	Released
30 June 2018	(Portugal) José Xavier	(Portugal) Braga	Released
11 January 2019	(Netherlands) Paul Gladon	(Netherlands) Groningen	Released
15 January 2019	(England) Will Randall	(Wales) Newport County	Released
15 January 2019	(Republic of Ireland) Daniel McKenna	(Republic of Ireland) Shelbourne	Released
30 January 2019	(Wales) Aaron Collins	(England) Forest Green Rovers	Released
31 January 2019	(Republic of Ireland) Joe Mason	(England) Milton Keynes Dons	Released
