= 2019–20 Wolverhampton Wanderers F.C. season =

English football club season

Wolverhampton Wanderers
2019–20 season
- Chairman: Jeff Shi
- Head coach: Nuno Espírito Santo
- Stadium: Molineux
- Premier League: 7th
- FA Cup: Third round
- EFL Cup: Fourth round
- UEFA Europa League: Quarter-finals
- Top goalscorer: League: Raúl Jiménez (17); All: Raúl Jiménez (27)
- Highest home attendance: 31,746 (vs Liverpool, 23 January 2020, Premier League)
- Lowest home attendance: 20,702 (vs Reading, 25 September 2019, EFL Cup)
- Average home league attendance: 31,360
Home colours	Away colours	Third colours

The 2019–20 season was the 142nd in the history of Wolverhampton Wanderers and the 3rd under then-head coach Nuno Espírito Santo. In that season, they competed in the Premier League for the 2nd consecutive time, the EFL Cup, the FA Cup and in a UEFA/continental competition for the first time since 1980–81 through/via the UEFA Europa League.

As a result of the suspension of competitive football in March 2020 due to the COVID-19 pandemic, the club were unable to play any match for 3 months since the UEL match on 12 March. A restart of the Premier League was made on 17 June, with the club returning to action 3 days later.

The team repeated their 7th-place finish of the previous Premier League season – with an improved points tally – but, as a result of Arsenal winning the FA Cup, this position was not sufficient to qualify for the UEFA Europa League again. A top-6 position would only have been guaranteed with victory on the final day, but Wolves lost 0–2 at Chelsea. Their continental campaign concluded at the quarter-final stage of a modified single-leg final tournament in Germany with defeat to the eventual winners Sevilla, lasting 383 days in total and signified their best performance in a UEFA competition since reaching the inaugural UEFA Cup Final in 1972.

== Competitions ==
=== Pre-season ===
Wolves were one of four teams invited to take part in the biennial Premier League Asia Trophy, which the team won. Owing to their participation in the qualifying rounds of the Europa League, these were the only other games the club undertook before the start of the league season.

17 July 2019 PLAT SF	Newcastle United	0–4	Wolverhampton Wanderers	Nanjing, China
18:00 CST		Report	Jota 15', 40'; Gibbs-White 32'; Allan 85' (o.g.)	Stadium: Nanjing Olympic Sports Centre; Referee: Martin Atkinson

20 July 2019 PLAT Final	Wolverhampton Wanderers	0–0 (3–2 p)	Manchester City	Shanghai, China
19:30 CST	Coady (yellow card) 76'	Report		Stadium: Hongkou Stadium; Referee: Martin Atkinson
	Penalties
	Coady (penalty missed); Bennett (penalty scored); Kilman (penalty missed); Perry (penalty scored); Vinagre (penalty scored)		(penalty missed) Gündoğan; (penalty missed) D. Silva; (penalty scored) Danilo; (penalty scored) García; (penalty missed) Nmecha

=== Mid-season friendlies ===
7 June 2020 Friendly	Wolverhampton Wanderers	0–2	Nottingham Forest	Wolverhampton
		Report	Walker ((pen.)); Bostock	Stadium: Molineux Stadium; Attendance: 0
Note: Match played in four quarters of 30 minutes.

11 June 2020 Friendly	Birmingham City	1–1	Wolverhampton Wanderers	Birmingham
	Jutkiewicz	Report	Gibbs-White	Stadium: St Andrew's; Attendance: 0
Note: Match played in four quarters of 30 minutes.

=== Premier League ===
==== League table ====
Pos	Team	Pld	W	D	L	GF	GA	GD	Pts	Qualification or relegation
5	Leicester City	38	18	8	12	67	41	+26	62	Qualification for the Europa League group stage
6	Tottenham Hotspur	38	16	11	11	61	47	+14	59	Qualification for the Europa League second qualifying round (Note: Since the winners of the 2019–20 EFL Cup, Manchester City, qualified for the Champions League group stage by league position, the spot given to the EFL Cup winners (Europa League second qualifying round) was passed down to the sixth-placed team.)
7	Wolverhampton Wanderers	38	15	14	9	51	40	+11	59	
8	Arsenal	38	14	14	10	56	48	+8	56	Qualification for the Europa League group stage (Note: Arsenal qualified for the Europa League group stage as the 2019–20 FA Cup winners.)
9	Sheffield United	38	14	12	12	39	39	0	54	

Source: Premier League
Rules for classification: 1) Points; 2) Goal difference; 3) Goals scored; 4) If the champions, relegated teams or qualified teams for UEFA competitions cannot be determined by rules 1 to 3, rules 4.1 to 4.3 are applied – 4.1) Points gained in head to head record between such teams; 4.2) Away goals scored in head to head record between such teams; 4.3) Play-offs

==== Results summary ====
Overall								Home						Away					
Pld	W	D	L	GF	GA	GD	Pts	W	D	L	GF	GA	GD	W	D	L	GF	GA	GD
38	15	14	9	51	40	+11	59	8	7	4	27	19	+8	7	7	5	24	21	+3

Last updated: 26 July 2020.
Source: https://www.premierleague.com/tables

==== Results by matchday ====
Matchday	1	2	3	4	5	6	7	8	9	10	11	12	13	14	15	16	17	18	19	20	21	22	23	24	25	26	27	28	29	30	31	32	33	34	35	36	37	38
Ground	A	H	H	A	H	A	H	A	H	A	A	H	A	H	H	A	H	A	H	A	A	H	A	H	A	H	H	A	H	A	H	A	H	A	H	A	H	A
Result	D	D	D	L	L	D	W	W	D	D	D	W	W	D	W	D	L	W	W	L	L	D	W	L	D	D	W	W	D	W	W	W	L	L	W	D	W	L
Position	13	13	15	17	19	19	13	11	13	12	12	8	5	6	5	6	8	6	5	7	7	7	6	7	8	8	8	6	6	6	6	6	6	6	6	6	6	7

Updated to match(es) played on 26 July 2020. Source: Premier League
A = Away; H = Home; W = Win; D = Draw; L = Loss

==== Results ====
The provisional fixture list was released on 13 June 2019, but was subject to change in the event of matches being selected for television coverage or police concerns. The coronavirus pandemic caused the suspension of all fixtures scheduled between 11 March and the planned end of the season on 17 May. Revised fixture lists for the matchdays following the resumption of the league were published on 5 June and 18 June 2020.

11 August 2019 1	Leicester City	0–0	Wolverhampton Wanderers	Leicester
14:00 BST		Report	Jonny (yellow card) 39'; Neves (yellow card) 60'	Stadium: King Power Stadium; Attendance: 32,015 (3,305 away fans); Referee: Andre Marriner

19 August 2019 2	Wolverhampton Wanderers	1–1	Manchester United	Wolverhampton
20:00 BST	Neves (yellow card) 51', (goal) 55'; Bennett (yellow card) 67'	Report	James (yellow card) 24'; Martial 27'; Pogba (penalty missed) 68'; Wan-Bissaka (yellow card) 84'	Stadium: Molineux; Attendance: 31,314 (2,964 away fans); Referee: Jon Moss
Note: Live on Sky Sports

25 August 2019 3	Wolverhampton Wanderers	1–1	Burnley	Wolverhampton
16:30 BST	Jiménez 90+7' (pen.)	Report	Barnes 13'; Tarkowski (yellow card) 59'; Lennon (yellow card) 88'	Stadium: Molineux; Attendance: 30,522 (1,297 away fans); Referee: Craig Pawson

1 September 2019 4	Everton	3–2	Wolverhampton Wanderers	Liverpool
14:00 BST	Richarlison 5', 80'; Iwobi 12'; Delph (yellow card) 63'	Report	Saïss 9'; Vinagre (yellow card) 39'; Jiménez (yellow card) 44', (goal) 75'; Boly (yellow card) 49' (yellow-red card) 90+5'; Bennett (yellow card) 58'; Neto (yellow card) 90+4'	Stadium: Goodison Park; Attendance: 39,374 (2,930 away fans); Referee: Anthony Taylor
Note: Live on Sky Sports

14 September 2019 5	Wolverhampton Wanderers	2–5	Chelsea	Wolverhampton
15:00 BST	Abraham 69' (o.g.); Saïss (yellow card) 79'; Cutrone 85'	Report	Tomori 31'; Abraham 34', 41', 55', (yellow card) 62'; Christensen (yellow card) 64'; Mount 90+6'	Stadium: Molineux; Attendance: 31,534 (2,966 away fans); Referee: Graham Scott

22 September 2019 6	Crystal Palace	1–1	Wolverhampton Wanderers	Selhurst, London
14:00 BST	McArthur (yellow card) 45'; Dendoncker 46' (o.g.); Ayew (yellow card) 62'	Report	Coady (yellow card) 44'; Saïss (yellow card) 48' (yellow-red card) 73'; Jota 90+5'	Stadium: Selhurst Park; Attendance: 25,122 (2,969 away fans); Referee: Stuart Attwell

28 September 2019 7	Wolverhampton Wanderers	2–0	Watford	Wolverhampton
15:00 BST	Doherty 18'; Janmaat 61' (o.g.)	Report	Holebas (yellow card) 68'	Stadium: Molineux; Attendance: 30,711 (2,302 away fans); Referee: Paul Tierney

6 October 2019 8	Manchester City	0–2	Wolverhampton Wanderers	Manchester
14:00 BST	Rodrigo (yellow card) 50'; Cancelo (yellow card) 50'; Ederson (yellow card) 62'; Gündoğan (yellow card) 71'; Fernandinho (yellow card) 76'	Report	Traoré 80', 90+4'; Neves (yellow card) 84'; Moutinho (yellow card) 86'	Stadium: Etihad Stadium; Attendance: 54,435 (3,010 away fans); Referee: Craig Pawson

19 October 2019 9	Wolverhampton Wanderers	1–1	Southampton	Wolverhampton
15:00 BST	Jiménez (yellow card) 29', (goal) 61' (pen.); Coady (yellow card) 45+1'; Vallejo (yellow card) 68'	Report	Valery (yellow card) 10'; Ings 53'; Bertrand (yellow card) 90+3'	Stadium: Molineux; Attendance: 30,915 (2,382 away fans); Referee: Peter Bankes

27 October 2019 10	Newcastle United	1–1	Wolverhampton Wanderers	Newcastle upon Tyne
14:00 GMT	Lascelles 53', (yellow card) 66'; Clark (yellow card) 55'; S. Longstaff (red card) 82'	Report	Saïss (yellow card) 69'; Jonny 73'; Neves (yellow card) 75'	Stadium: St James' Park; Attendance: 46,019 (3,162 away fans); Referee: Kevin Friend

2 November 2019 11	Arsenal	1–1	Wolverhampton Wanderers	Islington, London
15:00 GMT	Aubameyang 21'	Report	Saïss (yellow card) 67'; Jiménez 76'; Jota (yellow card) 89'	Stadium: Emirates Stadium; Attendance: 60,383 (3,003 away fans); Referee: Michael Oliver

10 November 2019 12	Wolverhampton Wanderers	2–1	Aston Villa	Wolverhampton
14:00 GMT	Saïss (yellow card) 12'; Neves 41'; Jota (yellow card) 74'; Jiménez 84'; Moutinho (yellow card) 86'; Jonny (yellow card) 90+1'	Report	Guilbert (yellow card) 10'; Nakamba (yellow card) 27'; Mings (yellow card) 40'; Trézéguet 90+2'	Stadium: Molineux; Attendance: 31,607 (2,970 away fans); Referee: Anthony Taylor

23 November 2019 13	Bournemouth	1–2	Wolverhampton Wanderers	Bournemouth
15:00 GMT	Billing (yellow card) 17'; Francis (yellow card) 21' (yellow-red card) 37'; Cook 59'; Rico (yellow card) 90'	Report	Saïss (yellow card) 4'; Moutinho 21'; Jiménez 31'	Stadium: Vitality Stadium; Attendance: 10,539 (1,265 away fans); Referee: Simon Hooper

1 December 2019 14	Wolverhampton Wanderers	1–1	Sheffield United	Wolverhampton
14:00 GMT	Dendoncker (yellow card) 3'; Doherty 64'	Report	Mousset 2'; Stevens (yellow card) 15'; Fleck (yellow card) 43'; Baldock (yellow card) 54'; O'Connell (yellow card) 63'; Egan (yellow card) 90'	Stadium: Molineux; Attendance: 31,642 (2,970 away fans); Referee: David Coote

4 December 2019 15	Wolverhampton Wanderers	2–0	West Ham United	Wolverhampton
19:30 GMT	Dendoncker 23'; Jota (yellow card) 30'; Cutrone 86'	Report	Rice (yellow card) 67'; Cresswell (yellow card) 79'	Stadium: Molineux; Attendance: 31,217 (2,653 away fans); Referee: Andre Marriner

8 December 2019 16	Brighton & Hove Albion	2–2	Wolverhampton Wanderers	Brighton
16:30 GMT	Maupay 34'; Pröpper 36'; Dunk (yellow card) 75'; Burn (yellow card) 82'; Stephens (yellow card) 90+2'	Report	Jota 28', 44'	Stadium: Falmer Stadium; Attendance: 30,189 (3,000 away fans); Referee: Jonathan Moss

15 December 2019 17	Wolverhampton Wanderers	1–2	Tottenham Hotspur	Wolverhampton
14:00 GMT	Moutinho (yellow card) 60'; Jonny (yellow card) 65'; Traoré 67'; Saïss (yellow card) 75'; Dendoncker (yellow card) 89'	Report	Lucas 8'; Sánchez (yellow card) 64'; Alderweireld (yellow card) 69'; Dier (yellow card) 77'; Kane (yellow card) 83'; Vertonghen 90+1'	Stadium: Molineux; Attendance: 31,674 (2,966 away fans); Referee: Stuart Attwell

21 December 2019 18	Norwich City	1–2	Wolverhampton Wanderers	Norwich
15:00 GMT	Cantwell 17'; Byram (yellow card) 53'; Hanley (yellow card) 90+1'	Report	Jonny (yellow card) 33'; Saïss (yellow card) 57', (goal) 60'; Moutinho (yellow card) 70'; Jiménez 81'; Doherty (yellow card) 90+6'	Stadium: Carrow Road; Attendance: 27,053 (2,632 away fans); Referee: Peter Bankes

27 December 2019 19	Wolverhampton Wanderers	3–2	Manchester City	Wolverhampton
19:45 GMT	Traoré 55'; Jiménez 82'; Doherty 89'	Report	Ederson (red card) 12'; Sterling (penalty missed) 25' 25', 50'; Otamendi (yellow card) 60'	Stadium: Molineux; Attendance: 31,737 (2,969 away fans); Referee: Martin Atkinson

29 December 2019 20	Liverpool	1–0	Wolverhampton Wanderers	Liverpool
16:30 GMT	Mané 42'; Lallana (yellow card) 45+1'	Report		Stadium: Anfield; Attendance: 53,326 (2,936 away fans); Referee: Anthony Taylor

1 January 2020 21	Watford	2–1	Wolverhampton Wanderers	Watford
15:00 GMT	Dawson (yellow card) 21'; Deulofeu 30'; Doucouré 49'; Kabasele (red card) 71'; Deeney (yellow card) 90+4'; Foster (yellow card) 90+6'	Report	Neto (yellow card) 26', (goal) 60'	Stadium: Vicarage Road; Attendance: 20,584 (2,204 away fans); Referee: Andrew Madley

11 January 2020 22	Wolverhampton Wanderers	1–1	Newcastle United	Wolverhampton
15:00 GMT	Dendoncker 14'	Report	Almirón 7', (yellow card) 67'; Atsu (yellow card) 67'; M. Longstaff (yellow card) 87'	Stadium: Molineux; Attendance: 31,570 (2,967 away fans); Referee: Peter Bankes

18 January 2020 23	Southampton	2–3	Wolverhampton Wanderers	Southampton
15:00 GMT	Bednarek 15', (yellow card) 57'; Ward-Prowse (yellow card) 29'; Long 35'	Report	Neto 53'; Jiménez 65' (pen.), 76'; Neves (yellow card) 88'	Stadium: St Mary's Stadium; Attendance: 31,152 (3,279 away fans); Referee: Darren England

23 January 2020 24	Wolverhampton Wanderers	1–2	Liverpool	Wolverhampton
20:00 GMT	Jiménez 51'	Report	Henderson 8'; Robertson (yellow card) 56'; Firmino 84'	Stadium: Molineux; Attendance: 31,746 (2,970 away fans); Referee: Michael Oliver

1 February 2020 25	Manchester United	0–0	Wolverhampton Wanderers	Greater Manchester
17:30 GMT	Fernandes (yellow card) 55'; Lindelöf (yellow card) 79'; Shaw (yellow card) 84'	Report	Neves (yellow card) 57'; Moutinho (yellow card) 71'	Stadium: Old Trafford; Attendance: 73,363 (3,117 away fans); Referee: Paul Tierney

14 February 2020 26	Wolverhampton Wanderers	0–0	Leicester City	Wolverhampton
20:00 GMT	Neves (yellow card) 45+1'; Dendoncker (yellow card) 55'	Report	Maddison (yellow card) 36'; Choudhury (yellow card) 51' (yellow-red card) 76'; Chilwell (yellow card) 88'	Stadium: Molineux; Attendance: 31,682 (2,968 away fans); Referee: Mike Dean

23 February 2020 27	Wolverhampton Wanderers	3–0	Norwich City	Wolverhampton
14:00 GMT	Jota 19', 30'; Jiménez (yellow card) 41', (goal) 50'; Coady (yellow card) 68'	Report	Aarons (yellow card) 45'; Godfrey (yellow card) 77'; Buendía (yellow card) 87'	Stadium: Molineux; Attendance: 31,046 (2,349 away fans); Referee: Chris Kavanagh

1 March 2020 28	Tottenham Hotspur	2–3	Wolverhampton Wanderers	Tottenham, London
14:00 GMT	Bergwijn 13'; Aurier 45'; Lo Celso (yellow card) 59'; Winks (yellow card) 84'; Davies (yellow card) 84'	Report	Doherty 27'; Jota 57'; Boly (yellow card) 71'; Jiménez 73'; Dendoncker (yellow card) 90+5'	Stadium: Tottenham Hotspur Stadium; Attendance: 58,064 (3,038 away fans); Referee: Stuart Attwell

7 March 2020 29	Wolverhampton Wanderers	0–0	Brighton & Hove Albion	Wolverhampton
15:00 GMT	Saïss (yellow card) 45+1'	Report	Montoya (yellow card) 37'; Burn (yellow card) 54'; Dunk (yellow card) 54'	Stadium: Molineux; Attendance: 31,490 (1,850 away fans); Referee: Andre Marriner

20 June 2020 30	West Ham United	0–2	Wolverhampton Wanderers	Stratford, London
17:30 BST	Antonio (yellow card) 62'	Report	Moutinho (yellow card) 57'; Jiménez 73'; Neto 84'	Stadium: London Stadium; Attendance: 0 (Note: Played behind closed doors due to social distancing restrictions in the wake of the COVID-19 pandemic.); Referee: Anthony Taylor

24 June 2020 31	Wolverhampton Wanderers	1–0	Bournemouth	Wolverhampton
18:00 BST	Saïss (yellow card) 27'; Neves (yellow card) 41'; Jiménez 60'; Moutinho (yellow card) 87'	Report	Brooks (yellow card) 34'; S. Cook (yellow card) 36'; C. Wilson (yellow card) 39'	Stadium: Molineux; Attendance: 0 Referee: Michael Oliver

27 June 2020 32	Aston Villa	0–1	Wolverhampton Wanderers	Birmingham
12:30 BST	Mings (yellow card) 18'	Report	Dendoncker 62'; Neves (yellow card) 90+4'	Stadium: Villa Park; Attendance: 0 Referee: Craig Pawson

4 July 2020 33	Wolverhampton Wanderers	0–2	Arsenal	Wolverhampton
17:30 BST	Saïss (yellow card) 75'; Coady (yellow card) 84'	Report	David Luiz (yellow card) 32'; Saka 43'; Maitland-Niles (yellow card) 79'; Lacazette 86'; Torreira (yellow card) 88'; Xhaka (yellow card) 90+1'	Stadium: Molineux; Attendance: 0 Referee: Michael Oliver

8 July 2020 34	Sheffield United	1–0	Wolverhampton Wanderers	Sheffield
18:00 BST	O'Connell (yellow card) 30'; Stevens (yellow card) 63'; Egan 90+3'	Report		Stadium: Bramall Lane; Attendance: 0 Referee: Martin Atkinson

12 July 2020 35	Wolverhampton Wanderers	3–0	Everton	Wolverhampton
12:00 BST	Jiménez 45+2' (pen.); Dendoncker 46'; Jota 74'	Report	Digne (yellow card) 19'; Keane (yellow card) 58'	Stadium: Molineux; Attendance: 0 Referee: Anthony Taylor

15 July 2020 36	Burnley	1–1	Wolverhampton Wanderers	Burnley
18:00 BST	Wood 90+6' (pen.)	Report	Jiménez 76'	Stadium: Turf Moor; Attendance: 0 Referee: Mike Dean

20 July 2020 37	Wolverhampton Wanderers	2–0	Crystal Palace	Wolverhampton
20:15 BST	Podence 41'; Coady (yellow card) 65'; Jonny 68'; Traoré (yellow card) 78'	Report	McCarthy (yellow card) 64'	Stadium: Molineux; Attendance: 0 Referee: Peter Bankes

26 July 2020 38	Chelsea	2–0	Wolverhampton Wanderers	Fulham, London
16:00 BST	Mount 45+1'; Giroud (yellow card) 45+3', (goal) 45+4'; Azpilicueta (yellow card) 90+2'	Report	Jota (yellow card) 22'; Neto (yellow card) 45'; Dendoncker (yellow card) 83'	Stadium: Stamford Bridge; Attendance: 0 Referee: Stuart Attwell

=== FA Cup ===
As a Premier League team, Wolves entered the competition at the third round proper stage in January 2020. The third round draw was made live on BBC Two from Etihad Stadium on 3 December 2019, Micah Richards and Tony Adams conducted the draw.

4 January 2020 Third round	Wolverhampton Wanderers	0–0	Manchester United	Wolverhampton
17:31 GMT (Note: All ties in the FA Cup third round begin a minute later than normal to encourage fans to "Take A Minute" to think about looking after their mental health as part of the Heads Up campaign.)	Saïss (yellow card) 57'; Kilman (yellow card) 72'; Moutinho (yellow card) 90+4'	Report	Young (yellow card) 86'	Stadium: Molineux; Attendance: 31,381 (4,760 away fans); Referee: Paul Tierney

15 January 2020 Third round replay	Manchester United	1–0	Wolverhampton Wanderers	Manchester
19:45 GMT	Fred (yellow card) 37'; Mata 67'; Maguire (yellow card) 74'	Report	Neto (yellow card) 59'; Dendoncker (yellow card) 84'	Stadium: Old Trafford; Attendance: 67,025 (2,797 away fans); Referee: Kevin Friend

=== EFL Cup ===
As a Premier League team involved in European competition, Wolves enter the competition in the third round. The third round draw was confirmed on 28 August 2019, live on Sky Sports. The draw for the fourth round was made on 25 September 2019.

25 September 2019 Third round	Wolverhampton Wanderers	1–1 (4–2 p)	Reading	Wolverhampton
19:45 BST	Neto (yellow card) 20'; Jordão 27'; Perry (yellow card) 90+4'	Report	Swift (yellow card) 63'; Boyé 90+9'	Stadium: Molineux Stadium; Attendance: 20,702 (563 away fans); Referee: Peter Bankes
	Penalties
	Neves (penalty scored); Vallejo (penalty scored); Bennett (penalty scored); Vinagre (penalty scored)		(penalty scored) Pușcaș; (penalty missed) Swift; (penalty missed) Boyé; (penalty scored) Miazga

30 October 2019 Fourth round	Aston Villa	2–1	Wolverhampton Wanderers	Birmingham
19:45 GMT	El Ghazi 28'; Elmohamady 57'; McGinn (yellow card) 84'	Report	Cutrone 54'	Stadium: Villa Park; Attendance: 34,962 (5,326 away fans); Referee: Lee Mason

=== UEFA Europa League ===
==== Qualifying stage ====
As a result of their seventh place league finish in the previous season as well as Manchester City winning all 3 domestic trophies on offer that season, Wolves entered the competition in the second round qualifying round whose draw was confirmed on 19 June 2019. The draw for the third round qualifying round was made on 22 July 2019 prior to the second round qualifying-round matches. The play-off round draw was announced on 5 August 2019. Wolves were seeded in all three draws.

25 July 2019 2nd round (1st leg)	Wolverhampton Wanderers (England)	2–0	(Northern Ireland) Crusaders	Wolverhampton
19:45 BST	Jota 37'; Vinagre 90+3'	Report		Stadium: Molineux; Attendance: 29,708 (284 away fans); Referee: Kristoffer Karlsson (Sweden)

1 August 2019 2nd round (2nd leg)	Crusaders (Northern Ireland)	1–4 (1–6 agg.)	(England) Wolverhampton Wanderers	Belfast, Northern Ireland
20:00 BST	Bennett 13' (o.g.); Burns (yellow card) 55'; Caddell (yellow card) 90+1'	Report	Jiménez 15', 45'; Bennett 38'; Jota (yellow card) 55'; Forsythe 77' (o.g.)	Stadium: Seaview; Attendance: 3,383 (541 away fans); Referee: Nejc Kajtazovic (Slovenia)

8 August 2019 3rd round (1st leg)	Pyunik (Armenia)	0–4	(England) Wolverhampton Wanderers	Yerevan, Armenia
20:00 AMT		Report	Doherty 30'; Saïss (yellow card) 32'; Jiménez 42', 46'; Moutinho (yellow card) 71'; Neves 90+1' (pen.)	Stadium: Republican Stadium; Attendance: 13,050 (48 away fans); Referee: Michael Fabbri (Italy)

15 August 2019 3rd round (2nd leg)	Wolverhampton Wanderers (England)	4–0 (8–0 agg.)	(Armenia) Pyunik	Wolverhampton
19:45 BST	Vallejo (yellow card) 27'; Neto 54'; Gibbs-White 58'; Vinagre 64'; Jota 87'	Report		Stadium: Molineux; Attendance: 29,391 (22 away fans); Referee: Donatas Rumšas (Lithuania) (Note: Bastian Dankert (Germany) was originally appointed to referee this match by UEFA but was replaced due to injury.)

22 August 2019 Play-off round (1st leg)	Torino (Italy)	2–3	(England) Wolverhampton Wanderers	Turin, Italy
21:00 CEST	Belotti (yellow card) 45+1', (goal) 89' (pen.); Ansaldi (yellow card) 48'; Berenguer (yellow card) 56'; De Silvestri 61'; Baselli (yellow card) 71'; Bremer (yellow card) 73'; Rincón (yellow card) 85'	Report	Bremer 43' (o.g.); Jota 59'; Jiménez 72'; Saïss (yellow card) 79'; Vallejo (yellow card) 82'	Stadium: Stadio Olimpico Grande Torino; Attendance: 24,091 (1,367 away fans); Referee: Artur Soares Dias (Portugal)

29 August 2019 Play-off round (2nd leg)	Wolverhampton Wanderers (England)	2–1 (5–3 agg.)	(Italy) Torino	Wolverhampton
19:45 BST	Jiménez 30'; Jonny (yellow card) 45'; Dendoncker 58'	Report	Baselli (yellow card) 33'; Lukić (yellow card) 48'; Belotti 57'; Bremer (yellow card) 63'	Stadium: Molineux; Attendance: 29,222 (474 away fans); Referee: Jesús Gil Manzano (Spain)

==== Group stage ====
The draw for the group stage was held on 30 August 2019. The club were drawn from pot 3 into Group K to face Beşiktaş, Braga and Slovan Bratislava.

Final table

Pos	Team	Pld	W	D	L	GF	GA	GD	Pts	Qualification	BRA	WOL	SLO	BES
1	(Portugal) Braga	6	4	2	0	15	9	+6	14	Advance to knockout phase	—	3–3	2–2	3–1
2	(England) Wolverhampton Wanderers	6	4	1	1	11	5	+6	13	Advance to knockout phase	0–1	—	1–0	4–0
3	(Slovakia) Slovan Bratislava	6	1	1	4	10	13	−3	4		2–4	1–2	—	4–2
4	(Turkey) Beşiktaş	6	1	0	5	6	15	−9	3		1–2	0–1	2–1	—

Source: UEFA
Rules for classification: Group stage tiebreakers

Results

19 September 2019 1	Wolverhampton Wanderers (England)	0–1	(Portugal) Braga	Wolverhampton
20:00 BST	Boly (yellow card) 90+6'	Report	Sequeira (yellow card) 70'; Horta 71'; Matheus (yellow card) 78'; Paulinho (yellow card) 90'	Stadium: Molineux Stadium; Attendance: 28,314 (176 away fans); Referee: Jakob Kehlet (Denmark)

3 October 2019 2	Beşiktaş (Turkey)	0–1	(England) Wolverhampton Wanderers	Istanbul, Turkey
19:55 TRT	Toköz (yellow card) 31'; Özyakup (yellow card) 90+4'	Report	Jonny (yellow card) 67'; Boly 90+3'	Stadium: Vodafone Park; Attendance: 22,670 (963 away fans); Referee: Harald Lechner (Austria)

24 October 2019 3	Slovan Bratislava (Slovakia)	1–2	(England) Wolverhampton Wanderers	Bratislava, Slovakia
18:55 CEST	Šporar 11'; Holman (yellow card) 45'; De Marco (yellow card) 63'; Ibrahim (yellow card) 68'; Medveděv (yellow card) 86'	Report	Saïss 58'; Jiménez 63' (pen.), (yellow card) 90+2'; Jota (yellow card) 86' (yellow-red card) 87'	Stadium: Národný Futbalový Štadión; Attendance: 20,333 (188 away fans) (Note: This match was officially behind closed doors due to UEFA sanctions imposed against the home team arising from crowd disorder and unrest at their play-off round tie against PAOK. Under UEFA rules, children aged under 14 were still allowed to attend such games (free of charge), with one adult for every 10 children also allowed entry to act as a supervisor. Wolves were allowed a restricted allocation of 200 tickets.); Referee: Yevhenii Aranovskiy (Ukraine)

7 November 2019 4	Wolverhampton Wanderers (England)	1–0	(Slovakia) Slovan Bratislava	Wolverhampton
20:00 GMT	Neves (penalty missed) 51'; Jiménez (yellow card) 89', (goal) 90+2'	Report		Stadium: Molineux; Attendance: 29,789 (986 away fans); Referee: Bas Nijhuis (Netherlands)

28 November 2019 5	Braga (Portugal)	3–3	(England) Wolverhampton Wanderers	Braga, Portugal
17:55 WET	Horta 6'; Galeno (yellow card) 37'; Paulinho 64'; Fransérgio 79'	Report	Jiménez 14', (yellow card) 68'; Doherty 34'; Traoré 35'; Dendoncker (yellow card) 84'	Stadium: Estádio Municipal de Braga; Attendance: 11,200 (5,824 away fans); Referee: Aleksei Kulbakov (Belarus)

12 December 2019 6	Wolverhampton Wanderers (England)	4–0	(Turkey) Beşiktaş	Wolverhampton
20:00 GMT	Kilman (yellow card) 40'; Jota 58', 63', 69'; Dendoncker 67'; Cutrone (yellow card) 90+2'	Report	Uysal (yellow card) 56'; Roco (yellow card) 90+2'	Stadium: Molineux; Attendance: 27,866 (545 away fans); Referee: Andris Treimanis (Latvia)

==== Knockout phase ====
The draw for the round of 32 was held on 16 December 2019. The club was unseeded due to finishing as runners-up in the group stage. The round of 16 ties were determined by an open draw held on 28 February 2020. The return leg of the team's round of 16 tie was postponed from its original date of 19 March due to the COVID-19 pandemic. In order to conclude the competition as promptly as possible, UEFA decided to organise a single-leg mini tournament in Germany for the final eight teams. An open draw was conducted to this end on 10 July 2020.

20 February 2020 Round of 32 (1st leg)	Wolverhampton Wanderers (England)	4–0	(Spain) Espanyol	Wolverhampton
20:00 GMT	Jota 15', 67', 81'; Moutinho (yellow card) 45'; Neves 52'	Report	Iturraspe (yellow card) 43'; Gómez (yellow card) 67'; Sánchez (yellow card) 78'	Stadium: Molineux; Attendance: 30,435 (1,322 away fans); Referee: Tobias Stieler (Germany)

27 February 2020 Round of 32 (2nd leg)	Espanyol (Spain)	3–2 (3–6 agg.)	(England) Wolverhampton Wanderers	Cornellà de Llobregat, Spain
18:55 CET	Calleri 15', 57' (pen.), 90+1', (yellow card) 66'; Sánchez (yellow card) 40'; Vargas (yellow card) 66'	Report	Traoré (yellow card) 6', (goal) 22'; Kilman (yellow card) 56'; Gibbs-White (yellow card) 63'; Doherty 79'	Stadium: RCDE Stadium; Attendance: 14,525 (2,126 away fans); Referee: Marco Guida (Italy)

12 March 2020 Round of 16 (1st leg)	Olympiacos (Greece)	1–1	(England) Wolverhampton Wanderers	Piraeus, Greece
22:00 EET	Semedo (red card) 29'; El-Arabi 54'; Sá (yellow card) 90'	Report	Doherty (yellow card) 8'; Coady (yellow card) 38'; Neto 67', (yellow card) 90'	Stadium: Karaiskakis Stadium; Attendance: 0 (Note: This match was played behind closed doors after the Greek authorities imposed a ban on public gatherings due to fears after the spread of the COVID-19 virus.); Referee: Clément Turpin (France)

6 August 2020 Round of 16 (2nd leg)	Wolverhampton Wanderers (England)	1–0 (2–1 agg.)	(Greece) Olympiacos	Wolverhampton
20:00 BST	Jiménez 9' (pen.), (yellow card) 90+4'; Moutinho (yellow card) 38'; Podence (yellow card) 71'	Report	Tsimikas (yellow card) 45+1'; Ba (yellow card) 45+4'; Cissé (yellow card) 75'	Stadium: Molineux; Attendance: 0 (Note: This match was played behind closed doors after UEFA decided that all its competitions would continue in this manner due to the spread of the COVID-19 virus.); Referee: Szymon Marciniak (Poland)

11 August 2020 Quarter-final	Wolverhampton Wanderers (England)	0–1	(Spain) Sevilla	Duisburg, Germany
21:00 CEST	Jiménez (penalty missed) 13'; Saïss (yellow card) 49'; Neves (yellow card) 90+1'	Report	Diego Carlos (yellow card) 12'; Ocampos 88'	Stadium: MSV-Arena; Attendance: 0 (Note: This match was played behind closed doors after UEFA decided that all its competitions will continue in this manner due to the spread of the COVID-19 virus.); Referee: Daniele Orsato (Italy)

=== EFL Trophy ===
Wolves were one of the sixteen teams from outside the bottom two divisions of the English Football League to be invited to field their academy team in the competition due to it holding Category 1 academy status. They were drawn into Group G in the Northern section, from which they advanced in second place. Note: In group stage matches which were level at the end of 90 minutes a penalty shoot-out was held, with the winner earning a bonus point.

24 September 2019 Group G (N)	Carlisle United	2–4	Wolverhampton Wanderers U21	Carlisle
19:45 BST	Hope 35'; Loft 45'	Report	Ashley-Seal 20', 47', 64'; Tsun Dai 40'	Stadium: Brunton Park; Attendance: 893 (72 away fans); Referee: Sebastian Stockbridge

1 October 2019 Group G (N)	Morecambe	2–2 (4–5 p)	Wolverhampton Wanderers U21	Morecambe
19:45 BST	Brewitt 25'; Howard 81'	Report	Watt 23'; Samuels 29'	Stadium: Globe Arena; Attendance: 514 (62 away fans); Referee: Ross Joyce
	Penalties
	Cranston (penalty scored); Buxton (penalty scored); O'Sullivan (penalty scored); Old (penalty scored); Howard (penalty missed); Mendes Gomes (penalty missed)		(penalty missed) Watt; (penalty scored) Perry; (penalty scored) Sanderson; (penalty scored) Tsun Dai; (penalty scored) Ashley-Seal; (penalty scored) Samuels

5 November 2019 Group G (N)	Blackpool	1–0	Wolverhampton Wanderers U21	Blackpool
19:45 GMT	Bushiri 90+3'	Report		Stadium: Bloomfield Road; Attendance: 1,036 (87 away fans); Referee: Anthony Backhouse

3 December 2019 Second round (N)	Salford City	3–0	Wolverhampton Wanderers U21	Salford
19:45 GMT	Armstrong 43', 47'; Towell 87'	Report		Stadium: Peninsula Stadium; Attendance: 505 (120 away fans)

== Players ==
=== Statistics ===
Key:
‡ On loan from another club * First appearance(s) for the club

- # = Squad number
- Pos = Playing position
- P = Number of games played
- G = Number of goals scored
- GK = Goalkeeper
- DF = Defender
- MF = Midfielder
- FW = Forward
- = Yellow cards
- = Red cards
- † Permanent player left club during the season
- ¤ Loaned to another club for part or all of season

Correct as of end of season. Starting appearances are listed first, followed by substitute appearances in parentheses where applicable.

No.	Pos	Name	P	G	P	G	P	G	P	G	P	G	A yellow card	A red card	Notes
No.	Pos	Name	League		FA Cup		League Cup		Other		Total		Discipline		Notes
2	DF	(Republic of Ireland) Matt Doherty	32(4)	4	2	0	1	0	11	3	46(4)	7	2	0	
4	DF	(Spain) Jesús Vallejo ‡	1(1)	0	0	0	2	0	3	0	6(1)	0	3	0	
5	DF	(England) Ryan Bennett ¤	7(4)	0	0	0	2	0	5(1)	1	14(5)	1	2	0	
6	MF	(Portugal) Bruno Jordão	0(1)	0	0	0	2	1	0(1)	0	2(2)	1	0	0	
7	MF	(Portugal) Pedro Neto	9(20)	3	2	0	2	0	4(7)	2	17(27)	5	6	0	
8	MF	(Portugal) Rúben Neves	35(3)	2	2	0	1	0	11(2)	2	49(5)	4	10	0	
9	FW	(Mexico) Raúl Jiménez	37(1)	17	1(1)	0	0	0	13(2)	10	51(4)	27	7	0	(Note: Jiménez was suspended vs Besiktas (h) due to accumulating two yellow cards in UEFA competitions.)
10	FW	(Italy) Patrick Cutrone ¤	3(9)	2	0	0	2	1	4(6)	0	9(15)	3	1	0	
10	MF	(Portugal) Daniel Podence	3(6)	1	0	0	0	0	2(2)	0	5(8)	1	1	0	
11	GK	(Portugal) Rui Patrício	38	0	0	0	0	0	15	0	53	0	0	0	
15	DF	(France) Willy Boly	22	0	0	0	0	0	13	1	35	1	2	1	(Note: Boly was suspended vs Chelsea (h) due to receiving a second yellow card vs Everton (a).)
16	DF	(England) Conor Coady	38	0	2	0	0	0	17	0	57	0	6	0	
17	MF	(England) Morgan Gibbs-White	1(6)	0	1	0	1	0	6(1)	1	7(8)	1	1	0	
18	FW	(Portugal) Diogo Jota	27(7)	7	0	0	0	0	8(6)	9	35(13)	16	5	1	(Note: Jota was suspended vs Slovan Bratislava (h) due to receiving a second yellow card vs Slovan Bratislava (a).)
19	DF	(Spain) Jonny	33(2)	2	1(1)	0	0	0	8(3)	0	42(6)	2	6	0	
21	GK	(England) John Ruddy	0	0	2	0	2	0	2	0	6	0	0	0	
23	DF	(England) Dion Sanderson ¤	0	0	0	0	1	0	0	0	1	0	1	0	
26	MF	(England) Taylor Perry	0	0	0	0	1(1)	0	0(1)	0	1(2)	0	1	0	
27	MF	(Morocco) Romain Saïss	31(2)	2	2	0	0	0	11(3)	1	44(5)	3	14	1	(Note: Saïss was suspended vs Reading (h) due to receiving a second yellow card vs Crystal Palace (a) and vs Sheffield United (h) due to accumulating a further five yellow cards.)
28	MF	(Portugal) João Moutinho	34(4)	1	1(1)	0	0	0	16(1)	0	51(6)	1	11	0	
29	DF	(Portugal) Rúben Vinagre	6(10)	0	1(1)	0	2	0	9(4)	2	18(15)	2	1	0	
30	FW	(Ecuador) Leonardo Campana	0	0	0	0	0	0	0	0	0	0	0	0	
32	MF	(Belgium) Leander Dendoncker	32(6)	4	2	0	0	0	11(6)	2	45(12)	6	7	0	
33	DF	(England) Ryan Giles ¤	0	0	0	0	0	0	0	0	0	0	0	0	
37	MF	(Spain) Adama Traoré	27(10)	4	2	0	0	0	12(3)	2	41(13)	6	2	0	
39	MF	(Wales) Terry Taylor	0	0	0	0	0(1)	0	0	0	0(1)	0	0	0	
40	FW	(Azerbaijan) Renat Dadashov	0	0	0	0	0	0	0	0	0	0	0	0	
49	DF	(England) Max Kilman	2(1)	0	1	0	2	0	5	0	10(1)	0	3	0	
54	MF	(United States) Owen Otasowie	0	0	0	0	0	0	0(1)	0	0(1)	0	0	0	
56	FW	(England) Benny Ashley-Seal ¤	0	0	1	0	0(1)	0	0	0	1(1)	0	0	0	
57	MF	(Germany) Meritan Shabani	0	0	0	0	0(1)	0	0	0	0(1)	0	0	0	
58	FW	(England) Austin Samuels ¤	0	0	0	0	0	0	0	0	0	0	0	0	
59	DF	(Denmark) Oskar Buur	0	0	0(1)	0	0	0	1	0	1(1)	0	0	0	
62	GK	(Denmark) Andreas Söndergaard	0	0	0	0	0	0	0	0	0	0	0	0	
66	MF	(Portugal) Flávio Cristóvão †	0	0	0	0	0(1)	0	0	0	0(1)	0	0	0	
68	MF	(England) Luke Cundle	0	0	0	0	0(1)	0	0	0	0(1)	0	0	0	
75	DF	(Switzerland) Christian Marques	0	0	0	0	0	0	0	0	0	0	0	0	
76	DF	(Republic of Ireland) Lewis Richards	0	0	0	0	0	0	0	0	0	0	0	0	
77	MF	(Wales) Chem Campbell	0	0	0	0	1	0	0	0	1	0	0	0	

=== Awards ===
Award	Winner
Fans' Player of the Season	Raúl Jiménez
Players' Player of the Season	Raúl Jiménez
Young Player of the Season	Pedro Neto
Academy Player of the Season	Christian Marques
Goal of the Season	Rúben Neves (vs Espanyol, 20 February 2020)

== Transfers ==
=== Transfers in ===
Date	Position	Nationality	Name	From	Fee	Team	Ref.
4 April 2019	CF	(Mexico)	Raúl Jiménez	(Portugal) Benfica	£30,000,000	First team	
23 May 2019	MF	(England)	Hong Wan	(England) Yeovil Town	Undisclosed	Under-23s	
28 June 2019	RB	(France)	Raphaël Nya	(France) Paris Saint-Germain	Undisclosed	Under-23s	
1 July 2019	DM	(Belgium)	Leander Dendoncker	(Belgium) Anderlecht	£12,000,000	First team	
3 July 2019	CM	(Northern Ireland)	Lee Harkin	(Northern Ireland) Moyola Park	Undisclosed	Academy	
10 July 2019	CM	(Hong Kong)	Tsun Dai	(England) Oxford United	Undisclosed	Under-23s	
12 July 2019	CF	(Spain)	Erik Bugarin	(Spain) Celta Vigo	Undisclosed	Academy	
12 July 2019	MF	(Wales)	Owen Hesketh	(England) Manchester City	Undisclosed	Academy	
12 July 2019	MF	(Northern Ireland)	Jack Scott	(Northern Ireland) Linfield	Undisclosed	Academy	
30 July 2019	CF	(Italy)	Patrick Cutrone	(Italy) Milan	Undisclosed	First-team	
31 July 2019	DM	(Portugal)	Flávio Cristóvão	(Portugal) Aves	Free transfer	Under-23s	
2 August 2019	CM	(Portugal)	Bruno Jordão	(Portugal) Braga	Undisclosed	First-team	
2 August 2019	RW	(Portugal)	Pedro Neto	(Portugal) Braga	Undisclosed	First-team	
6 August 2019	CF	(Azerbaijan)	Renat Dadashov	(Portugal) Estoril Praia	Undisclosed	Under-23s	
8 August 2019	AM	(Germany)	Meritan Shabani	(Germany) Bayern Munich	Undisclosed	Under-23s	
9 August 2019	DF	(Central African Republic)	Cyriaque Mayounga	(France) Lyon	Undisclosed	Under-23s	
24 December 2019	GK	(Iceland)	Pálmi Rafn Arinbjörnsson	(Iceland) Njarðvík	Undisclosed	Academy	
15 January 2020	DF	(Netherlands)	Justin Hubner	(Netherlands) Den Bosch	Undisclosed	Academy	
21 January 2020	CF	(Ecuador)	Leonardo Campana	(Ecuador) Barcelona	Undisclosed	Under-23s	
24 January 2020	CB	(Netherlands)	Nigel Lonwijk	(Netherlands) PSV Eindhoven	Undisclosed	Under-23s	
30 January 2020	LW	(Portugal)	Daniel Podence	(Greece) Olympiacos	Undisclosed	First-team	
31 January 2020	RB	(England)	Luke Matheson	(England) Rochdale	Undisclosed	Under-23s	

=== Loans in ===
Date	Position	Nationality	Name	From	Date Until	Team	Ref.
27 July 2019	CB	(Spain)	Jesús Vallejo	(Spain) Real Madrid	24 January 2020 (Note: This was originally to be a season-long loan but Wolves decided during the January transfer window to send Vallejo on a sub-loan to Granada.)	First team	
29 January 2020	CM	(France)	Enzo Loiodice	(France) Dijon	30 June 2020	Under-23s	

=== Transfers out ===
Date	Position	Nationality	Name	To	Fee	Team	Ref.
20 May 2019	RB	(England)	Kevin Berkoe	(England) Oxford United	Free transfer	Academy	
29 May 2019	CB	(England)	Ethan Ebanks-Landell	(England) Shrewsbury Town	Undisclosed	First team	
30 May 2019	DF	(England)	Aaron Crabtree	(United States) SIU Edwardsville Cougars	Released	Academy	
30 May 2019	CB	(Republic of Ireland)	Ray O'Sullivan	(Republic of Ireland) Athlone Town	Released	Academy	
30 May 2019	CF	(England)	Taylor Townsend	(England) Alvechurch	Released	Academy	
30 May 2019	CB	(England)	Ben Goodliffe	(England) Sutton United	Released	Under-23s	
30 May 2019	CB	(England)	Aaron Hayden	(England) Carlisle United	Released	Under-23s	
30 May 2019	RB	(England)	Diego Lattie	(England) Droylsden	Released	Under-23s	
30 May 2019	RW	(Dominican Republic)	Carlos Heredia	(Poland) Miedź Legnica	Released	Under-23s	
30 May 2019	FW	(France)	Enzo Sauvage	(France) Athlético Marseille	Released	Under-23s	
30 May 2019	RW	(Poland)	Michał Żyro	(Poland) Korona Kielce	Released	First team	
17 June 2019	CB	(England)	Kortney Hause	(England) Aston Villa	£3,000,000	First team	
1 July 2019	GK	(Spain)	Adrián Álvarez	(Spain) Leganés	Free transfer	Under-23s	
2 July 2019	MF	(Portugal)	João Caiado	(Portugal) Famalicão	Undisclosed	Under-23s	
2 July 2019	CM	(Portugal)	Pedro Gonçalves	(Portugal) Famalicão	Undisclosed	Under-23s	
8 July 2019	LW	(Netherlands)	Sherwin Seedorf	(Scotland) Motherwell	Undisclosed	Under-23s	
10 July 2019	CB	(Wales)	Ryan Leak	(Spain) Burgos	Free transfer	Under-23s	
22 July 2019	CF	(England)	Donovan Wilson	(Spain) Burgos	Free transfer	Under-23s	
23 July 2019	GK	(Scotland)	Jack Ruddy	(Scotland) Ross County	Free transfer	First team	
3 September 2019	GK	(Wales)	Jack Atkinson	(Wales) Bangor City	Free transfer	Under-23s	
8 September 2019	MF	(Portugal)	Paulinho	(Czech Republic) Příbram	Free transfer	Under-23s	
7 January 2020	RW	(Portugal)	Ivan Cavaleiro	(England) Fulham	Undisclosed	First team	
31 January 2020	LB	(France)	Sylvain Deslandes	(Romania) Argeș	Undisclosed	Under-23s	
31 January 2020	GK	(England)	Harry Burgoyne	(England) Shrewsbury Town	Undisclosed	First team	
31 January 2020	CM	(Portugal)	Flávio Cristóvão	(Austria) Juniors OÖ	Free transfer	Under-23s	
14 May 2020	CF	(Nigeria)	Bright Enobakhare	(Greece) AEK Athens	Left by mutual consent	First team	

=== Loans out ===
Date from	Position	Nationality	Name	To	Date until	Team	Ref.
5 June 2019	CM	(Slovakia)	Christián Herc	(Czech Republic) Viktoria Plzeň	30 June 2021	Under-23s	
28 June 2019	MF	(Republic of Ireland)	Connor Ronan	(Slovakia) FC DAC 1904	31 December 2019	Under-23s	
1 July 2019	FW	(China)	David Wang	(Spain) Granollers	23 February 2020	Under-23s	
1 July 2019	LM	(England)	Ryan Giles	(England) Shrewsbury Town	17 January 2020 (Note: This was originally to be a season-long loan but Giles was recalled during the January transfer window.)	Under-23s	
3 July 2019	RW	(Portugal)	Hélder Costa	(England) Leeds United	30 June 2020	First team	
13 July 2019	RW	(Portugal)	Ivan Cavaleiro	(England) Fulham	7 January 2020	First team	
30 July 2019	FW	(Spain)	Rafa Mir	(England) Nottingham Forest	2 January 2020	First team	
30 July 2019	GK	(England)	Will Norris	(England) Ipswich Town	30 June 2020	First team	
2 August 2019	CF	(England)	Niall Ennis	(England) Doncaster Rovers	30 June 2020	Under-23s	
2 August 2019	CB	(England)	Cameron John	(England) Doncaster Rovers	30 June 2020	Under-23s	
6 August 2019	CF	(Azerbaijan)	Renat Dadashov	(Portugal) Paços de Ferreira	1 January 2020	Under-23s	
8 August 2019	CF	(Nigeria)	Bright Enobakhare	(England) Wigan Athletic	1 January 2020	First team	
8 August 2019	GK	(England)	James Pardington	(England) Bath City	30 June 2020	Under-23s	
30 August 2019	CF	(Brazil)	Léo Bonatini	(Portugal) Vitória	30 June 2020	First team	
1 September 2019	CB	(Portugal)	Roderick	(Portugal) Famalicão	30 June 2020	First team	
3 September 2019	CB	(England)	Connor Johnson	(Scotland) Kilmarnock	30 June 2020	Under-23s	
6 September 2019	DM	(England)	Sadou Diallo	(England) Accrington Stanley	30 June 2020	Under-23s	
1 January 2020	CM	(Scotland)	Elliot Watt	(England) Carlisle United	30 June 2020	Under-23s	
10 January 2020	CF	(Italy)	Patrick Cutrone	(Italy) Fiorentina	7 January 2021	First team	
14 January 2020	CF	(Spain)	Rafa Mir	(Spain) Huesca	30 June 2021	First team	
16 January 2020	FW	(England)	Austin Samuels	(England) Kidderminster Harriers	30 June 2020	Under-23s	
17 January 2020	MF	(Republic of Ireland)	Connor Ronan	(England) Blackpool	30 June 2020	Under-23s	
20 January 2020	LB	(Norway)	John Kitolano	(Norway) Molde	31 December 2020	Under-23s	
31 January 2020	CF	(England)	Benny Ashley-Seal	(England) Accrington Stanley	30 June 2020	Under-23s	
31 January 2020	LM	(England)	Ryan Giles	(England) Coventry City	30 June 2020	Under-23s	
31 January 2020	LW	(England)	Jordan Graham	(England) Gillingham	30 June 2020	First team	
31 January 2020	RB	(England)	Luke Matheson	(England) Rochdale	30 June 2020	First team	
31 January 2020	RW	(Republic of Ireland)	Callum Thompson	(Republic of Ireland) Bohemians	30 June 2020	Under-23s	
31 January 2020	CB	(England)	Dion Sanderson	(England) Cardiff City	30 June 2020	Under-23s	
31 January 2020	CB	(England)	Ryan Bennett	(England) Leicester City	30 June 2020	First team	
11 February 2020	FW	(Portugal)	Boubacar Hanne	(Switzerland) Grasshopper	30 June 2020	Under-23s	
18 February 2020	MF	(England)	Hong Wan	(Croatia) NK Varaždin	30 June 2020	Under-23s	
18 February 2020	DF	(England)	Ed Francis	(Switzerland) Grasshopper	30 June 2020	Under-23s	
25 February 2020	FW	(China)	David Wang	(China) Nantong Zhiyun	31 December 2020	Under-23s	

== Kits ==
Home	Home alt.	Away	Away alt.1	Away alt.2	Third
