= Bright Enobakhare =

Nigerian footballer (born 1998)

Personal information
- Full name: Bright Enobakhare
- Date of birth: 8 February 1998 (age 28)
- Place of birth: Benin City, Nigeria
- Height: 1.80 m (5 ft 11 in)
- Positions: Striker; right winger

Team information
- Current team: Diamond Harbour
- Number: 48

Youth career
- 2013–2014: Northfield Town
- 2014–2015: Wolverhampton Wanderers

Senior career*
| Years | Team | Apps | (Gls) |
| 2015–2020 | Wolverhampton Wanderers | 41 | (1) |
| 2018 | → Kilmarnock (loan) | 6 | (0) |
| 2019 | → Coventry City (loan) | 18 | (6) |
| 2019 | → Wigan Athletic (loan) | 2 | (0) |
| 2020 | AEK Athens | 1 | (1) |
| 2021 | East Bengal | 12 | (3) |
| 2021 | Coventry City | 0 | (0) |
| 2022 | Hapoel Jerusalem | 4 | (0) |
| 2022–2023 | Rukh Lviv | 1 | (0) |
| 2023–2025 | Al Bidda | 19 | (7) |
| 2025– | Diamond Harbour | | |

International career
| 2019 | Nigeria U23 | 2 | (0) |
- * Club domestic league appearances and goals

Bright Enobakhare (born 8 February 1998) is a Nigerian professional footballer who plays as a forward for Diamond Harbour.

== Career ==
=== Early career ===
Having moved from his native Nigeria to Birmingham, England aged 14, Enobakhare started playing for Northfield Town Juniors where he was part of the team coached by Liam Bryan who won the Birmingham youth County FA cup in 2014, scoring two goals for Northfield Town as they beat Rugby Town 3–1 at Villa Park. Following his success Enobakhare had trials at several clubs before joining the academy system at Wolverhampton Wanderers.

=== Wolverhampton Wanderers ===
In the summer of 2015, Enobakhare signed his first professional contract with Wolverhampton Wanderers, scoring in a 3–2 friendly win over Chambly on his debut. He scored the winner in a 4–3 friendly win over Doncaster Rovers at the Keepmoat Stadium on 2 August. Four days later, manager Kenny Jackett stated that Enobakhare was going to play in the first team during the upcoming season, due to a shortage of other forwards.

On 11 August 2015, Enobakhare was first included in Wolves' matchday squad, remaining an unused substitute in their 2–1 win over Newport County in the first round of the League Cup. Two weeks later in the next round, he was given his debut as a starter, and scored within the first three minutes when set up by Adam Le Fondre. On 29 September, he played his first game in The Football League, replacing Le Fondre for the final seven minutes of a 3–0 Championship win at Fulham. Enobakhare scored his first league goal for Wolves in a 2–1 home win against Barnsley on 23 September 2017 after replacing Ivan Cavaleiro in the 65th minute.

On 31 August 2018, Enobakhare was loaned to Scottish Premiership club Kilmarnock until the new year, when he moved to League One side Coventry City on loan for the remainder of the season.

On 8 August 2019, Enobakhare joined Championship club Wigan Athletic on loan for the season. He played an EFL Cup game and two league matches as a substitute, trained with their youth team for several months and returned to Wolves prematurely in January.

On 14 May 2020, Enobakhare left Wolves by a mutual agreement after a total of 49 first team appearances and 3 goals for his parent club.

=== AEK Athens ===
On 20 June 2020, AEK Athens officially announced the acquisition of Enobakhare on a three-year deal, on a free transfer. On 27 September 2020, he scored his first goal for the club on his debut against Lamia after coming on as a substitute 8 minutes earlier. On 5 October 2020, Enobakhare mutually dissolved his contract with the club just a few months after reaching an agreement with them. He played just 14 minutes in the Greek Super League, in the match against Lamia.

=== East Bengal ===
On 1 January 2021, Bright Enobakhare joined Indian Super League side East Bengal for the remainder of 2020–21 Indian Super League season. At that time, the century-old club was struggling in their very first appearance in this tournament. His inclusion in the team had an immediate impact. On 3 January 2021, he made his debut for the club and scored his first goal in the same match and his team won their match against Odisha FC. In the very next match, Enobakhare scored a spectacular solo goal to help his team get a point against FC Goa. He assisted Scott Neville for a late equalizer in a 1–1 draw against Kerala Blasters.

=== Coventry City ===
On 13 July 2021, Enobakhare signed a two-year contract with Coventry City on a free transfer. On 1 November 2021 however, his contract was cancelled by mutual consent with Enobakhare having only made one appearance for the club that season, an EFL Cup defeat to Northampton Town.

=== Hapoel Jerusalem ===
On 30 January 2022, he signed for Hapoel Jerusalem. He was later released on the 4th of April due to missing training. Diamond Harbour He joined diamond Harbour in the year 2025

== Career statistics ==
As of 21 March 2022

Appearances and goals by club, season and competition
| Club | Season | League | | | National Cup | | League Cup | | Other | | Total | |
| Club | Season | Division | Apps | Goals | Apps | Goals | Apps | Goals | Apps | Goals | Apps | Goals |
|---|---|---|---|---|---|---|---|---|---|---|---|---|
| Wolverhampton Wanderers | 2015–16 | Championship | 7 | 0 | 0 | 0 | 2 | 1 | — | | 9 | 1 |
| Wolverhampton Wanderers | 2016–17 | Championship | 13 | 0 | 1 | 0 | 0 | 0 | — | | 14 | 1 |
| Wolverhampton Wanderers | 2017–18 | Championship | 21 | 1 | 2 | 0 | 3 | 1 | — | | 26 | 2 |
| Wolverhampton Wanderers | 2018–19 | Premier League | 0 | 0 | 0 | 0 | 0 | 0 | — | | 0 | 0 |
| Wolverhampton Wanderers | 2019–20 | Premier League | 0 | 0 | 0 | 0 | 0 | 0 | — | | 0 | 0 |
| Wolverhampton Wanderers | Total | | 41 | 1 | 3 | 0 | 5 | 2 | 0 | 0 | 49 | 3 |
| Kilmarnock (loan) | 2018–19 | Scottish Premiership | 6 | 0 | — | | — | | — | | 6 | 0 |
| Coventry City (loan) | 2018–19 | League One | 18 | 6 | — | | — | | — | | 18 | 6 |
| Wigan Athletic (loan) | 2019–20 | Championship | 2 | 0 | — | | 1 | 0 | — | | 3 | 0 |
| AEK Athens | 2020–21 | Super League Greece | 1 | 1 | 0 | 0 | — | | — | | 1 | 1 |
| East Bengal | 2020–21 | Indian Super League | 12 | 3 | 0 | 0 | — | | — | | 12 | 3 |
| Coventry City | 2021–22 | Championship | 0 | 0 | 0 | 0 | 1 | 0 | — | | 1 | 0 |
| Hapoel Jerusalem | 2021–22 | Israeli Premier League | 4 | 0 | 0 | 0 | 0 | 0 | — | | 4 | 0 |
| Rukh Lviv | 2022-23 | Ukrainian Premier League | 1 | 0 | 0 | 0 | 0 | 0 | | | 1 | 0 |
| Al Bidda | 2023-24 | Qatari Second Division | 13 | 6 | 2 | 1 | | | | | 15 | 7 |
| Al Bidda | 2024-25 | Qatari Second Division | 5 | 1 | 0 | 0 | | | | | 5 | 1 |
| Career total | | | 84 | 11 | 3 | 0 | 7 | 2 | 0 | 0 | 94 | 13 |

== Honours ==
Wolverhampton Wanderers

- EFL Championship: 2017–18

Individual

- Coventry City Young Player of the Year: 2018–19
