= Ryan Giles =

English footballer (born 2000)

- Giles in 2026

Personal information
- Full name: Ryan John Giles
- Date of birth: 26 January 2000 (age 26)
- Place of birth: Telford, England
- Position: Left-back

Team information
- Current team: Hull City
- Number: 3

Youth career
- 2008–2018: Wolverhampton Wanderers

Senior career*
Years	Team	Apps	(Gls)
2018–2023	Wolverhampton Wanderers	0	(0)
2018	→ AFC Telford United (loan)	9	(2)
2019–2020	→ Shrewsbury Town (loan)	19	(1)
2020	→ Coventry City (loan)	1	(0)
2020–2021	→ Coventry City (loan)	19	(0)
2021	→ Rotherham United (loan)	23	(2)
2021–2022	→ Cardiff City (loan)	21	(0)
2022	→ Blackburn Rovers (loan)	11	(0)
2022–2023	→ Middlesbrough (loan)	45	(0)
2023–2024	Luton Town	11	(0)
2024	→ Hull City (loan)	17	(0)
2024–	Hull City	54	(0)
2025	→ Middlesbrough (loan)	12	(0)

International career
2019	England U20	4	(0)
- * Club domestic league appearances and goals as of 15:27, 13 October 2026 (UTC)

Ryan John Giles (born 26 January 2000) is an English professional footballer who plays as a left-back for Premier League club Hull City.

== Club career ==
Giles was born in Telford, Shropshire, grew up in St George's and attended Wrockwardine Wood School. He progressed through Wolverhampton Wanderers' youth system, winning the Academy Player of the Year Award for the 2017–18 season.

The midfielder was one of a group of young players taken on a pre-season tour with the first team in summer 2018. He was an unused substitute in several EFL Cup ties before signing a four-year contract with the club.

On 24 March 2018, he was loaned to his hometown club AFC Telford United in the National League North for the rest of the season, being signed by his future Wolves under-23 coach Rob Edwards. He made his debut the same day in a goalless home draw with Darlington as an 82nd-minute substitute for Jordan Lussey. He totalled nine appearances and provided seven assists as the Bucks avoided relegation, and he scored in home and away wins against Spennymoor Town in April.

He made his Wolves debut on 26 January 2019, his 19th birthday in an FA Cup fourth round tie away at Shrewsbury Town. The match ended as a 2–2 draw.

On 1 July 2019, Giles temporarily located back to Shropshire once again, signing for League One side Shrewsbury Town on a planned season-long loan. On his debut on 3 August, he scored the only goal of a home win in the season opener against Portsmouth. On 17 January 2020, he was recalled by his parent club due to injury to Wolves' Rúben Vinagre.

Giles returned to League One on January deadline day 2020, joining Coventry City on loan for the rest of the 2019–20 season. He made his only appearance on 25 February in a 1–1 home draw with Rotherham United, as a last-minute substitute for Sam McCallum. The season was curtailed due to the COVID-19 pandemic, with Coventry promoted as champions.

On 25 January 2021, he was recalled by Wolverhampton, and loaned the next day to Rotherham United until the end of the season. He made his debut for them on 27 January, away at Middlesbrough. Coming on in the 88th minute, he scored in stoppage time to complete a 3–0 win.

On 13 July 2021, it was announced that he had signed on loan to Cardiff City on loan for the 2021–22 season. On 3 January 2022, Giles was recalled by his parent club and left Cardiff. At the time of his recall, Giles had registered nine assists, a tally that could not be bettered in the Championship.

On 31 January 2022, Giles joined EFL Championship side Blackburn Rovers on loan for the remainder of the 2021–22 season.

On 23 June 2022, Giles joined Middlesbrough on loan for the duration of the 2022–23 season.

On 28 July 2023, debutant Premier League side Luton Town announced the permanent signing of Giles, reuniting him with manager Rob Edwards who gave Giles his senior debut during his loan spell at AFC Telford. The transfer fee was reported to be around £5 million.

On 30 January 2024, Giles joined Championship club Hull City on a six-month loan. He made his debut for the club on 3 February in the home 1–0 win against Millwall.

On 27 June 2024, Hull City triggered their option to sign Giles from Luton Town, following his loan spell with the club in the 2023–24 season. Giles has signed a three-year deal with the club for an undisclosed fee.

On 23 January 2025, Giles joined Michael Carrick's Middlesbrough on loan until the end of the season.

== International career ==
In August 2019, Giles received his first England call-up, for under-20 matches against the Netherlands and Switzerland in the following month. He made his debut on 5 September in a goalless draw with the Dutch, starting the match at his club ground, the New Meadow.

== Career statistics ==
As of match played 11 October 2026

Appearances and goals by club, season and competition
Club	Season	League			FA Cup		EFL Cup		Other		Total	
Club	Season	Division	Apps	Goals	Apps	Goals	Apps	Goals	Apps	Goals	Apps	Goals
Wolverhampton Wanderers	2017–18	Championship	0	0	0	0	0	0	—		0	0
Wolverhampton Wanderers	2018–19	Premier League	0	0	1	0	0	0	—		1	0
Wolverhampton Wanderers	2019–20	Premier League	0	0	0	0	0	0	0	0	0	0
Wolverhampton Wanderers	2020–21	Premier League	0	0	0	0	0	0	—		0	0
Wolverhampton Wanderers	2021–22	Premier League	0	0	0	0	0	0	—		0	0
Wolverhampton Wanderers	2022–23	Premier League	0	0	0	0	0	0	—		0	0
Wolverhampton Wanderers	Total		0	0	1	0	0	0	0	0	1	0
Wolverhampton Wanderers U21	2018–19	—			—		—		3 (Note: Appearances in EFL Trophy)	1	3	1
AFC Telford United (loan)	2017–18	National League North	9	2	0	0	—		0	0	9	2
Shrewsbury Town (loan)	2019–20	League One	19	1	3	0	1	0	2	0	25	1
Coventry City (loan)	2019–20	League One	1	0	0	0	0	0	0	0	1	0
Coventry City (loan)	2020–21	Championship	19	0	1	0	1	0	—		21	0
Coventry City (loan)	Total		20	0	1	0	1	0	0	0	22	0
Rotherham United (loan)	2020–21	Championship	23	2	0	0	0	0	—		23	2
Cardiff City (loan)	2021–22	Championship	21	0	0	0	0	0	—		21	0
Blackburn Rovers (loan)	2021–22	Championship	11	0	0	0	0	0	—		11	0
Middlesbrough (loan)	2022–23	Championship	45	0	1	0	0	0	2 (Note: Appearances in EFL Championship play-offs)	0	48	0
Luton Town	2023–24	Premier League	11	0	1	0	2	0	—		14	0
Hull City (loan)	2023–24	Championship	17	0	—		—		—		17	0
Hull City	2024–25	Championship	16	0	1	0	1	0	—		18	0
Hull City	2025–26	Championship	32	0	1	0	1	0	3	0	37	0
Hull City	2026–27	Premier League	6	0	0	0	0	0	—		6	0
Hull City	Total		54	0	2	0	2	0	3	0	61	0
Middlesbrough (loan)	2024–25	Championship	1	0	0	0	1	0	—		2	0
Career total			231	5	9	0	7	0	10	1	257	6

== Honours ==
Hull City

- EFL Championship play-offs: 2026
