= Harry Burgoyne =

English footballer

Personal information
- Full name: Harry James Burgoyne
- Date of birth: 28 December 1996 (age 29)
- Place of birth: Ludlow, England
- Height: 6 ft 5 in (1.95 m)
- Position: Goalkeeper

Team information
- Current team: Shrewsbury Town (goalkeeper coach)

Youth career
- Ludlow Town
- 2008–2015: Wolverhampton Wanderers
- 2013: → Doncaster Rovers (youth loan)

Senior career*
Years	Team	Apps	(Gls)
2015–2020	Wolverhampton Wanderers	7	(0)
2015	→ Lowestoft Town (loan)	4	(0)
2015	→ Corby Town (loan)	5	(0)
2015–2016	→ AFC Telford United (loan)	9	(0)
2017	→ Barnet (loan)	2	(0)
2018	→ Plymouth Argyle (loan)	0	(0)
2019	→ Falkirk (loan)	15	(0)
2020–2024	Shrewsbury Town	22	(0)
2024–2025	Morecambe	28	(0)
2025–2026	Alfreton Town	1	(0)
- * Club domestic league appearances and goals as of 19:15, 23 October 2025 (UTC)

Harry James Burgoyne (born 28 December 1996) is an English professional footballer who is also a goalkeeping coach for Shrewsbury Town.

He began his career at Wolverhampton Wanderers, where he played eight first-team matches and was loaned to several clubs.

== Career ==
=== Early career ===
Burgoyne was born Ludlow, Shropshire. He joined Wolverhampton Wanderers at the age of 12, having been spotted filling in as a goalkeeper for the first time for local team Ludlow Town. Following unsuccessful trials at West Bromwich Albion and Birmingham City, he signed an initial two-year deal with the club before committing to a two-year professional contract in March 2015.

He joined Doncaster Rovers for a brief youth loan at the age of 16, which included an FA Youth Cup appearance against Manchester City. Burgoyne was nominated for Wolves' Academy Player of the Season for the 2014–15 season, which was won by Regan Upton.

In May 2015, he was part of the squad that won the U19 Bitzer Cup in Germany. Burgoyne played four of the five games, conceding just a single goal. The final went to penalties and he saved the fifth one with Wolves winning 5–4. Burgoyne joined the first-team squad on a pre-season tour of France in July 2015.

He attended Bitterley Primary School and Ludlow Church of England School, where he was a school prefect, head of house and sports captain.

=== Lowestoft Town (loan) ===
In September 2015, Burgoyne gained his first experience of senior football with a one-month loan at National League North side Lowestoft Town. After recording a clean sheet on his debut, he claimed the Man of the Match award in the two following games. Making five appearances for the side, an initial extension on the loan was cut short after being recalled due to injuries in the Wolves U21 squad.

=== Corby Town (loan) ===
In November 2015, Burgoyne joined National League North club Corby Town on a one-month loan. He made six appearances prior to his return. As part of the agreements between the two sides, Burgoyne continued to train with Wolverhampton Wanderers during his loan spell and was made available on matchdays.

=== A.F.C. Telford United (loan) ===
In December 2015, he completed a loan move to National League North side A.F.C. Telford United to cover for injured goalkeeper James Montgomery. In February 2015, the club extended his loan for the remainder of the season. Burgoyne made nine appearances for the Bucks.

=== Wolverhampton Wanderers ===
On 10 December, Burgoyne made his Football League debut in a 4–4 draw against Fulham. With Carl Ikeme and Andy Lonergan both injured, he was preferred over third-choice goalkeeper Jon Flatt. Burgoyne was named the Man of the Match by the club's sponsors.

On 28 January 2017, Burgoyne was again favoured in goal with Ikeme suspended and Lonergan unfit for Wanderers' fourth-round FA Cup tie at Liverpool. His side recorded a 2–1 victory in the giant-killing.

=== Loan spells ===
On 25 February 2017, Burgoyne joined Barnet on an emergency seven-day loan with Jamie Stephens and Josh Vickers out injured. He made his debut in a 1–0 defeat to Cambridge United later that day. After returning to Molineux, Burgoyne had his first international call-up, for the England under-21 friendly against Romania on 24 March 2018.

On 16 June 2018, Burgoyne joined League One side Plymouth Argyle on a season-long loan. He returned to Wolves a month later due a broken ankle. It was later announced that as Argyle were still paying contribution for his wages, Burgoyne would see through his season-long loan at The Pilgrims, having initially returned to Wolves for treatment.

Burgoyne returned to Wolves in December 2018, having never played a competitive game for Argyle, after his loan was terminated by both clubs by mutual consent. He then moved on loan to Scottish Championship club Falkirk in January 2019.

=== Shrewsbury Town ===
On 31 January 2020, after 12 months with the club, Burgoyne left to sign for League One side Shrewsbury Town on a short-term contract until the end of the 2019–20 season, making him the club's sixth January signing. On 3 May 2022 Shrewsbury Town exercised a contract extension to retain Burgoyne for an additional season.

He was released by Shrewsbury at the end of the 2023–24 season.

=== Morecambe ===
Burgoyne was one of 15 free agents that signed for League Two club Morecambe on 12 July 2024, after the club's embargo on registering new players was lifted. On 7 August 2025, he announced via an X post that he had left Morecambe amid the ownership crisis affecting the club.

=== Alfreton Town ===
Following his departure from Morecambe, Burgoyne returned to Wolverhampton Wanderers whilst he looked for a new club.

On 21 October 2025, Burgoyne joined National League North club Alfreton Town.

== Career statistics ==
As of 20 January 2024

Appearances and goals by club, season and competition
Club	Season	League			National Cup		League Cup		Other		Total	
Club	Season	Division	Apps	Goals	Apps	Goals	Apps	Goals	Apps	Goals	Apps	Goals
Wolverhampton Wanderers	2015–16	Championship	0	0	0	0	0	0	0	0	0	0
Wolverhampton Wanderers	2016–17	Championship	6	0	1	0	0	0	0	0	7	0
Wolverhampton Wanderers	2017–18	Championship	1	0	0	0	0	0	0	0	1	0
Wolverhampton Wanderers	2018–19	Premier League	0	0	0	0	0	0	0	0	0	0
Wolverhampton Wanderers	2019–20	Premier League	0	0	0	0	0	0	0	0	0	0
Wolverhampton Wanderers	Total		7	0	1	0	0	0	0	0	8	0
Wolverhampton Wanderers U23	2016–17	—			—		—		3 (Note: Appearances in EFL Trophy)	0	3	0
Lowestoft Town (loan)	2015–16	National League North	4	0	1	0	—		0	0	5	0
Corby Town (loan)	2015–16	National League North	5	0	0	0	—		1 (Note: Appearance in FA Trophy)	0	6	0
A.F.C. Telford United (loan)	2015–16	National League North	9	0	0	0	—		0	0	9	0
Barnet (loan)	2016–17	League Two	2	0	0	0	0	0	0	0	2	0
Plymouth Argyle (loan)	2018–19	League One	0	0	0	0	0	0	0	0	0	0
Falkirk (loan)	2018-19	Scottish Championship	15	0	0	0	0	0	0	0	15	0
Shrewsbury Town	2019–20	League One	0	0	0	0	0	0	0	0	0	0
Shrewsbury Town	2020–21	League One	18	0	1	0	1	0	3	0	23	0
Shrewsbury Town	2021–22	League One	0	0	1	0	0	0	3	0	4	0
Shrewsbury Town	2022–23	League One	2	0	0	0	0	0	3	0	5	0
Shrewsbury Town	2023–24	League One	4	0	0	0	0	0	2	0	6	0
Shrewsbury Town	Total		24	0	2	0	1	0	11	0	38	0
Morecambe	2024–25	League Two	28	0	2	0	1	0	3	0	34	0
Career total			94	0	6	0	2	0	18	0	120	0
