= Willy Boly =

Ivorian footballer (born 1991)

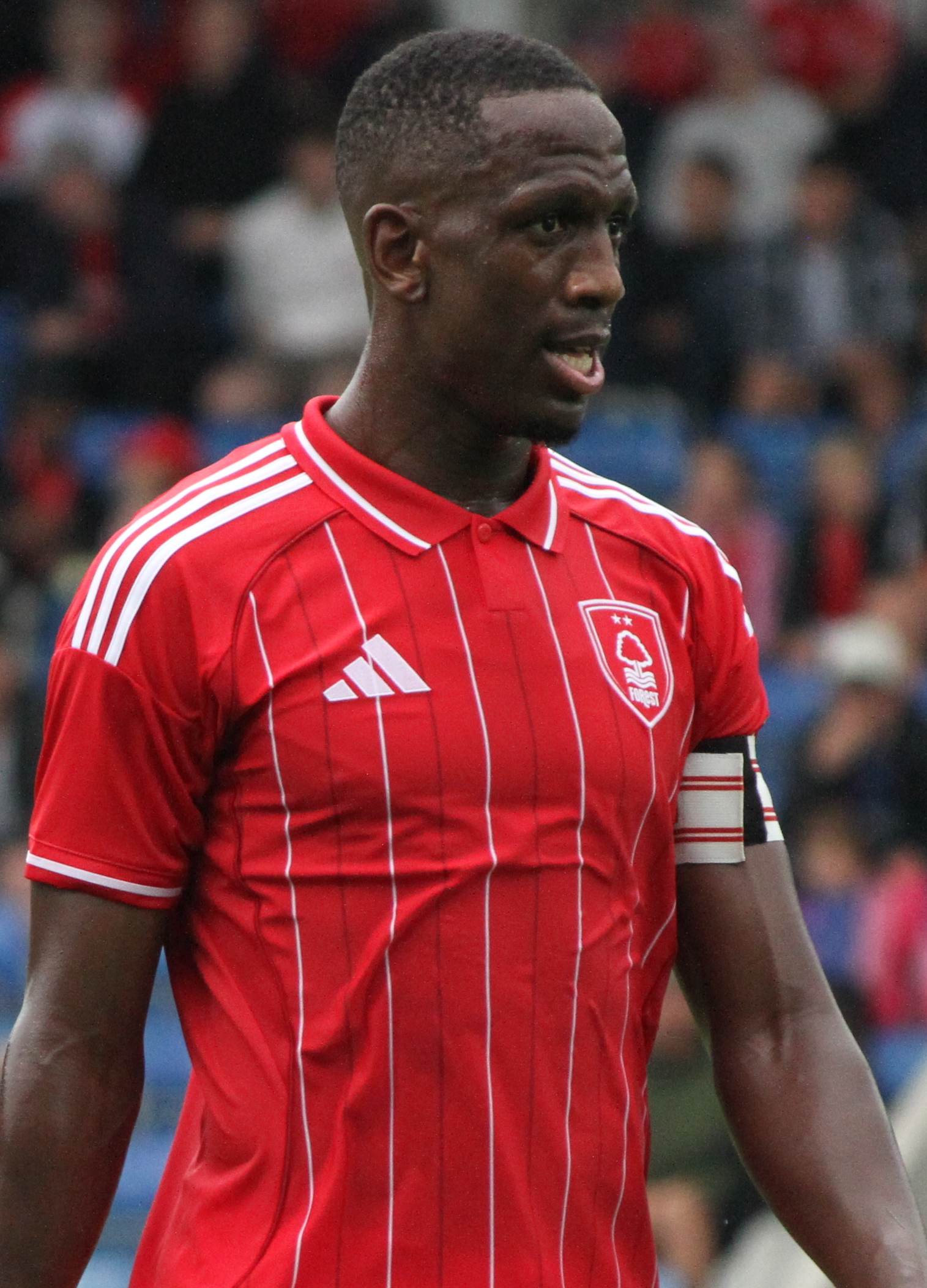
- Boly with Nottingham Forest in 2025

Personal information
- Full name: Willy-Arnaud Zobo Boly
- Date of birth: 3 February 1991 (age 35)
- Place of birth: Melun, France
- Height: 1.95 m (6 ft 5 in)
- Position: Centre-back

Youth career
- 2000–2002: Rosny-sous-Bois
- 2002–2006: CFF Paris
- 2004–2007: Clairefontaine
- 2007–2011: Auxerre

Senior career*
Years	Team	Apps	(Gls)
2010–2014	Auxerre B	27	(2)
2011–2014	Auxerre	97	(3)
2014–2015	Braga B	16	(1)
2015–2016	Braga	25	(2)
2016–2018	Porto	4	(0)
2017–2018	→ Wolverhampton Wanderers (loan)	36	(3)
2018–2022	Wolverhampton Wanderers	89	(5)
2022–2026	Nottingham Forest	37	(2)

International career^{‡}
2006	France U16	1	(0)
2007–2008	France U17	4	(0)
2010	France U19	1	(0)
2020–	Ivory Coast	23	(1)
Medal record
Representing Ivory Coast
Men's football
Africa Cup of Nations
Winner	2023 Ivory Coast
- * Club domestic league appearances and goals as of 17:00, 5 April 2025 (UTC) ‡ National team caps and goals as of 10 October 2025 (UTC)

Willy-Arnaud Zobo Boly (born 3 February 1991) is a professional footballer who plays as a centre-back. Born in France, he represents the Ivory Coast national team.

== Club career ==
=== Auxerre ===
Born in Melun, Seine-et-Marne, Boly played youth football for three clubs, also having a three-year spell at the INF Clairefontaine academy. He made his senior debut with AJ Auxerre's reserves and, in February 2011, he signed his first professional contract after agreeing to a three-year deal with an option for a fourth.

On 16 April 2011, Boly made his Ligue 1 debut by playing the full 90 minutes in a 1–0 away win against Toulouse. He scored his first goal in the competition the following matchday, in a 1–1 home draw to Lens.

Boly was an undisputed starter in the 2011–12 season (33 games, one goal), but the AJA were relegated to Ligue 2 after finishing last.

=== Braga ===
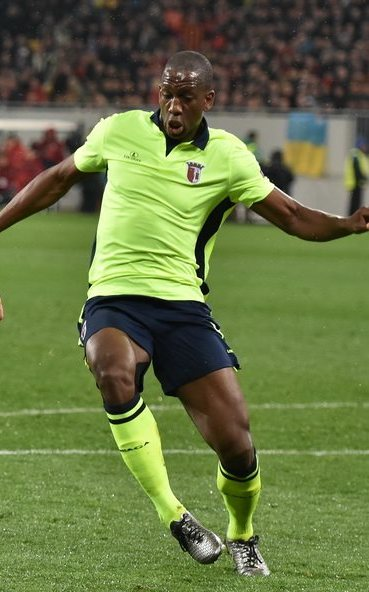
Boly with Braga in 2016

On 1 September 2014, Boly moved to Portugal and joined Braga on a four-year deal. He spent his first season with the B-team, in the Segunda Liga.

=== Porto ===
On 31 August 2016, Boly signed a five-year contract with Porto with a €45 million buyout clause. He played only eight competitive matches during his spell, including the 1–0 away loss against Juventus FC for the last-16 stage of the UEFA Champions League where he featured the second half after coming on as a substitute for André Silva.

=== Wolverhampton Wanderers ===
On 8 July 2017, Boly joined EFL Championship club Wolverhampton Wanderers on a season-long loan, reuniting him with his former head coach Nuno Espírito Santo. He made his competitive debut for Wolverhampton on the opening day of the 2017–18 season in a 1–0 home win against Middlesbrough, and scored his first goal with them on 31 October to help Wolves win 2–0 away against Norwich City.

After making 37 official appearances and helping them achieve promotion, Boly signed a permanent contract with Wolves. He made his Premier League debut on 11 August 2018, in a 2–2 home draw against Everton. He scored his first goal in the competition two weeks later in a 1–1 home draw to Manchester City, but the goal proved controversial as television replays showed the ball was deflected into the goal by his forearm after glancing off his head.

Boly scored his first ever goal in UEFA European competition in Wolves's 2019–20 UEFA Europa League Group stage game against Beşiktaş in Istanbul on 3 October 2019, a game that Wolves won 1–0.

Boly fractured his left fibula in training on 26 October 2019, necessitating surgery to insert a plate and screws on 30 October 2019. Boly returned from this injury in Wolves's 0–0 draw away to Manchester United on 1 February 2020, although he had been an unused substitute in Wolves's previous Premier League fixture at home to Liverpool on 23 January 2020.

Boly scored his first goal of the 2020–21 season, and his first Premier League goal since the 2018–19 season, on 16 January 2021 against West Bromwich Albion in the Black Country derby.

On 5 April 2021, after returning from playing with his national team in the 2021 Africa Cup of Nations qualifications, Wolves announced that Boly had caught COVID-19, and was self-isolating in line with government guidance. Wolves's head coach, Nuno Espírito Santo, announced after Wolves's Premier League game with West Bromwich Albion on 3 May 2021 that Boly was suffering the effects of long covid, ruling him out from appearing for Wolves in the game that evening. Boly would not feature for Wolves again until 19 May 2021, when he played the full 90 minutes of the away Premier League game at Everton.

=== Nottingham Forest ===
On 1 September 2022, Boly signed with Premier League side Nottingham Forest on a two-year deal for an undisclosed fee. On 5 June 2024, the club said the player had signed a one-year extension.

On 10 June 2026, the club said it was releasing the player.

== International career ==
Born to Ivorian parents, Boly represented France at under-16, under-17 and under-19 levels.

Boly switched to represent the Ivory Coast national team in 2020. He debuted for the Ivory Coast in a 2–1 2021 Africa Cup of Nations qualification win over Madagascar on 12 November 2020.

On 28 December 2023, he was included in the list of twenty-seven Ivorian players selected by Jean-Louis Gasset to compete in the 2023 Africa Cup of Nations.

Boly was included in the list of Ivorian players selected by coach Emerse Faé to participate in the 2025 Africa Cup of Nations.

== Career statistics ==
=== Club ===
As of match played 24 September 2025

Appearances and goals by club, season and competition
Club	Season	League			National cup (Note: Includes Coupe de France, Taça de Portugal, FA Cup)		League cup (Note: Includes Coupe de la Ligue, Taça da Liga, EFL Cup)		Europe		Other		Total	
Club	Season	Division	Apps	Goals	Apps	Goals	Apps	Goals	Apps	Goals	Apps	Goals	Apps	Goals
Auxerre	2010–11	Ligue 1	8	1	0	0	0	0	—		—		8	1
Auxerre	2011–12	Ligue 1	33	1	2	0	2	0	—		—		37	1
Auxerre	2012–13	Ligue 2	25	1	0	0	2	0	—		—		27	1
Auxerre	2013–14	Ligue 2	30	0	4	1	4	0	—		—		38	1
Auxerre	2014–15	Ligue 2	1	0	—		2	0	—		—		3	0
Auxerre	Total		97	3	6	1	10	0	—		—		113	4
Braga	2014–15	Primeira Liga	0	0	0	0	1	0	0	0	—		1	0
Braga	2015–16	Primeira Liga	22	2	4	0	1	0	12 (Note: Appearance(s) in UEFA Europa League)	0	—		39	2
Braga	2016–17	Primeira Liga	3	0	—		—		—		1 (Note: Appearance in Supertaça Cândido de Oliveira)	0	4	0
Braga	Total		25	2	4	0	2	0	12	0	1	0	44	2
Porto	2016–17	Primeira Liga	4	0	0	0	2	0	1 (Note: Appearance in UEFA Champions League)	0	—		7	0
Wolverhampton Wanderers (loan)	2017–18	Championship	36	3	0	0	1	0	—		—		37	3
Wolverhampton Wanderers	2018–19	Premier League	36	4	5	0	0	0	—		—		41	4
Wolverhampton Wanderers	2019–20	Premier League	22	0	0	0	0	0	13	1	—		35	1
Wolverhampton Wanderers	2020–21	Premier League	21	1	1	0	1	0	—		—		23	1
Wolverhampton Wanderers	2021–22	Premier League	10	0	0	0	1	0	—		—		11	0
Wolverhampton Wanderers	Wolves total		125	8	6	0	3	0	13	1	—		147	9
Nottingham Forest	2022–23	Premier League	11	0	0	0	4	1	—		—		15	1
Nottingham Forest	2023–24	Premier League	20	2	0	0	1	0	—		—		21	2
Nottingham Forest	2024–25	Premier League	6	0	2	0	1	0	—		—		9	0
Nottingham Forest	2025–26	Premier League	0	0	0	0	1	0	1	0	—		2	0
Nottingham Forest	Total		37	2	2	0	7	1	1	0	—		47	3
Career total			288	15	18	1	24	1	27	1	1	0	358	18

=== International ===
As of match played 10 October 2025

Appearances and goals by national team and year
National team	Year	Apps	Goals
Ivory Coast	2020	2	0
Ivory Coast	2021	8	1
Ivory Coast	2022	3	0
Ivory Coast	2023	2	0
Ivory Coast	2024	7	0
Ivory Coast	2025	1	0
Total		23	1

Scores and results list Ivory Coast's goal tally first. Score column indicates score after each Boly goal.

List of international goals scored by Willy Boly
No.	Date	Venue	Opponent	Score	Result	Competition
1.	30 March 2021	Stade National, Abidjan, Ivory Coast	Ethiopia	1–0	3–1	2021 Africa Cup of Nations qualification

== Honours ==
Braga

- Taça de Portugal: 2015–16

Wolverhampton Wanderers

- EFL Championship: 2017–18

Ivory Coast

- Africa Cup of Nations: 2023

Individual

- PFA Team of the Year: 2017–18 Championship
