= David Wang (footballer) =

Spanish footballer

Personal information
- Date of birth: 12 January 2000 (age 26)
- Place of birth: Cuenca, Spain
- Height: 1.76 m (5 ft 9 in)
- Position: Winger

Team information
- Current team: Guangxi Lanhang
- Number: 17

Youth career
- 2014–2016: Móstoles
- 2016–2018: Jumilla
- 2016–2017: → Murcia (youth loan)
- 2017–2018: → Josep Maria Gené (youth loan)

Senior career*
Years	Team	Apps	(Gls)
2018	Jumilla	0	(0)
2018	→ Estudiantes (loan)	12	(0)
2019–2021	Wolverhampton Wanderers	0	(0)
2019	→ Sporting (loan)	0	(0)
2019–2020	→ Granollers (loan)	3	(0)
2020	→ Nantong Zhiyun (loan)	1	(0)
2021–2024	Nantong Zhiyun	16	(0)
2024–	Guangxi Lanhang	15	(2)
- * Club domestic league appearances and goals as of 15:05, 23 July 2024 (UTC)

David Wang (born 12 January 2000), also known as Wang Jiahao (Chinese: 王佳豪; pinyin: Wáng Jiāháo), is a Spanish professional footballer who plays as a winger for China League Two club Guangxi Lanhang.

== Club career ==
Wang was born in Cuenca, Spain, and started his career with Móstoles. He was bought by newly-Chinese-owned Jumilla in 2016, but as they did not have a youth academy set up yet, he was loaned immediately to fellow Spanish side Real Murcia, before joining Josep María Gené on loan the following season. During this period he was included in The Guardian's "Next Generation 2017". Wang signed for English Premier League side Wolverhampton Wanderers in January 2019, and was immediately loaned to Portuguese side Sporting. After failing to secure a place in the Sporting CP youth team, having appeared seven times on the bench, he was recalled from loan. However, he was unable to obtain a UK work visa, and was sent back to Spain with Granollers.

Having only made three substitute appearances with Granollers, Wang was again recalled, and this time sent to China to join China League One side Nantong Zhiyun. After one appearance for Nantong Zhiyun, Wang officially joined the club in February 2021 on a permanent transfer. He would gradually go on to establish himself within the team and helped the club gain promotion to the top tier at the end of the 2022 China League One season.

He signed for Guangxi Lanhang for the 2024 season.

== International career ==
Wang was called up to the China under-16 national football team in 2015, and has expressed his desire to represent his parents' nation at international level. He was seen as a very highly rated young player in China.

== Career statistics ==
As of 31 December 2022.

Appearances and goals by club, season and competition
Club	Season	League			Cup		Other		Total	
Club	Season	Division	Apps	Goals	Apps	Goals	Apps	Goals	Apps	Goals
Jumilla	2018–19	Segunda División B	0	0	0	0	–		0	0
Estudiantes (loan)	2018–19	Tercera División	12	0	0	0	–		12	0
Wolverhampton Wanderers	2019–20	Premier League	0	0	0	0	–		0	0
Wolverhampton Wanderers	2020–21	Premier League	0	0	0	0	–		0	0
Wolverhampton Wanderers	Total		0	0	0	0	0	0	0	0
Sporting (loan)	2019–20	Primeira Liga	0	0	0	0	–		0	0
Granollers (loan)	2019–20	Tercera División	3	0	0	0	–		3	0
Nantong Zhiyun (loan)	2020	China League One	1	0	0	0	–		1	0
Nantong Zhiyun	2021	China League One	5	0	1	0	–		6	0
Nantong Zhiyun	2022	China League One	11	0	1	0	–		12	0
Nantong Zhiyun	Total		16	0	2	0	0	0	18	0
Career total			32	0	2	0	0	0	34	0
