= Jack Ruddy =

Scottish footballer

Personal information
- Full name: John Robert Ruddy
- Date of birth: 27 December 1997 (age 28)
- Place of birth: Glasgow, Scotland
- Position: Goalkeeper

Youth career
- 2004–2009: Rangers
- 2010–2013: Real Murcia

Senior career*
Years	Team	Apps	(Gls)
2013–2014	Real Murcia	0	(0)
2014–2016	Bury	1	(0)
2016–2019	Wolverhampton Wanderers	0	(0)
2017–2018	→ Oldham Athletic (loan)	5	(0)
2018	→ Ayr United (loan)	11	(0)
2018–2019	→ FC Jumilla (loan)	4	(0)
2019	→ S.S. Reyes (loan)	6	(0)
2019–2020	Ross County	0	(0)
2020	Leganés B	1	(0)
2020–2021	Plymouth Argyle	0	(0)
2021–2022	Linfield	0	(0)
2022	Darvel		
2022	East Kilbride	0	(0)
2022–2023	Cowdenbeath	0	(0)
2023–2024	Dulwich Hamlet	8	(0)
2024	Bo'ness United	1	(0)

International career^{‡}
2015	Scotland U19	1	(0)
2017	Scotland U20	4	(0)
2017	Scotland U21	1	(0)
Medal record
Scotland
Toulon Tournament
Bronze medal – third place	2017 Toulon	U–20 Competition
- * Club domestic league appearances and goals as of 11:44, 15 January 2024 ‡ National team caps and goals as of 4 March 2019

John Robert Ruddy (born 27 December 1997) is a Scottish footballer who played as a goalkeeper for Lowland League East club Bo'ness United.

== Club career ==
=== Early career ===
Born in Glasgow, Ruddy was on the books of hometown team Rangers from the age of seven to twelve, being coached by Andy Goram, before emigrating to Murcia in Spain in 2010. At the age of fifteen, after impressing for Torre Pacheco, he signed a contract for Real Murcia. Ruddy went on trial with Villarreal, but he was unable to sign a professional contract with any Spanish club due to a regulation requiring young players to have resided in Spain for at least five years.

=== Bury ===
On 30 July 2014, Ruddy returned to the United Kingdom, signing for Bury. He was first featured in a matchday squad on 8 November, remaining an unused substitute for their 3–1 win over Hemel Hempstead Town at Gigg Lane in the first round of the FA Cup. Ruddy was first included in a league game on 28 December, again remaining on the bench in a 2–0 League Two triumph of the same score against Mansfield Town, repeating the feat four times as the team earned promotion to League One. Ruddy made his professional debut on 14 November 2015, playing the full 90 minutes of a 3–1 League One loss at Gillingham in what turned out to be his only first team appearance for Bury.

=== Wolverhampton Wanderers ===
On 29 August 2016 Ruddy signed for Championship club Wolverhampton Wanderers on a two-year deal, with the option of a further year, for an undisclosed fee. He was named on the bench once over the season, for a 3–1 loss at Derby County on 29 April 2017. In December 2017, he extended his contract until the end of the 2019–20 campaign.

On 31 August 2017, Ruddy was sent on loan to League One side Oldham Athletic until 1 January. He was then loaned to Scottish League One club Ayr United.

Ruddy was one of nine Wolves youngsters loaned to Spanish Segunda División B team FC Jumilla in August 2018. He made four appearances and was sent off at the end of his last game, a 2–2 draw at CD El Ejido, for insulting the referee. On 1 February 2019, he joined S.S. Reyes of the same league until the end of the season.

Ruddy was released by Wolves during the 2019 close season.

=== After Wolves ===
Ruddy signed a six-month contract with Ross County in July 2019. Unused, he was released in January 2020, and returned to Spain to sign for CD Leganés B.

On 6 September 2020, Ruddy signed a short-term contract with League One club Plymouth Argyle until January 2021, having successfully completing a trial. Signed due to Luke McCormick's shoulder injury, he played two EFL Trophy games and sat on the bench for league games as Michael Cooper played. His deal was then expanded until the end of the season.

After being released from Plymouth, Ruddy signed in June 2021 for Linfield, reigning champions of the NIFL Premiership. Ruddy left Linfield by mutual consent on 31 January 2022

On 25 March 2022, Ruddy signed for West of Scotland League Premier Division side Darvel.

After a short spell with East Kilbride, Ruddy then signed for Cowdenbeath.

Following a successful trial period, Ruddy signed for Isthmian League Premier Division side Dulwich Hamlet ahead of the 2023–24 season. In January 2024, he joined Lowland League club Bo'ness United.

== International career ==
Ruddy was called up for the Scottish under-19 team in September 2015 for a friendly tournament in Germany the following month; he was the only member of the squad playing outside the top two divisions of English or Scottish football. He earned his only cap at that level on 9 October in a 2–2 draw with the United States in Reutlingen.

Selected for the Scotland under-20 squad in the 2017 Toulon Tournament. The team went to claim the bronze medal. It was the nations first ever medal at the competition.

After four games at under-20 level, Ruddy played his only under-21 game on 28 March 2017, a goalless draw with Estonia.

== Career statistics ==
As of match played 23 July 2019

Appearances and goals by club, season and competition
Club	Season	League			FA Cup		League Cup		Other		Total	
Club	Season	Division	Apps	Goals	Apps	Goals	Apps	Goals	Apps	Goals	Apps	Goals
Bury	2015–16	League One	1	0	0	0	0	0	0	0	1	0
Wolverhampton Wanderers	2016–17	Championship	0	0	0	0	0	0	0	0	0	0
Oldham Athletic (loan)	2017–18	League One	5	0	0	0	0	0	0	0	5	0
Ayr United (loan)	2017–18	Scottish League One	11	0	2	0	0	0	0	0	13	0
FC Jumilla (loan)	2018–19	Segunda División B – Group 4	4	0	0	0	0	0	0	0	4	0
S.S. Reyes (loan)	2018–19	Segunda División B – Group 1	6	0	0	0	0	0	0	0	6	0
Ross County	2019–20	Scottish Premiership	0	0	0	0	0	0	–		0	0
Career total			27	0	2	0	0	0	0	0	29	0

== Honours ==
Ayr United

- Scottish League One: 2017–18

Darvel

- West of Scotland Football League Premier Division: 2021–22
