= Paulinho (footballer, born December 1997) =

Portuguese footballer

Personal information
- Full name: Paulo Manuel Neves Alves
- Date of birth: 25 December 1997 (age 28)
- Place of birth: São João da Madeira, Portugal
- Height: 1.76 m (5 ft 9 in)
- Position: Midfielder

Youth career
- 2006–2007: Sanjoanense
- 2007–2012: Porto
- 2012–2013: Padroense
- 2013–2014: Porto
- 2014–2015: Sanjoanense
- 2015–2016: Liverpool

Senior career*
Years	Team	Apps	(Gls)
2014–2015	Sanjoanense	12	(0)
2016–2018	Liverpool	0	(0)
2018–2019	Wolverhampton Wanderers	0	(0)
2019–2020	Příbram	1	(0)
2020–2021	Sanjoanense	35	(4)
2021–2022	Felgueiras 1932	23	(0)
2022–2025	Leixões	54	(3)
- * Club domestic league appearances and goals

Paulo Manuel Neves Alves (born 25 December 1997), commonly known as Paulinho, is a Portuguese former footballer who played as a midfielder.

== Football career ==
From 2015, Paulinho spent three years with Liverpool, as part of the club's Academy; he was included in the senior squad for the first time in January 2017, appearing as an unused substitute in an FA Cup third-round replay tie against Plymouth Argyle.

At the end of the 2017–18 season, having not played a game for Liverpool's first team, he was transferred to Wolves, playing for their Under-23s, including two appearances in the EFL Trophy.

In 2019, he transferred to 1. FK Příbram, making his professional debut on 30 September 2019 in the Czech First League. In January 2020, having failed to add to his solitary appearance, he moved to Campeonato de Portugal side A.D. Sanjoanense.

On 17 December 2025, Paulinho retired from playing for health reasons.

== Career statistics ==
As of match played 8 February 2025

Appearances and goals by club, season and competition
Club	Season	League			National cup (Note: Includes Taça de Portugal, FA Cup, Czech Cup)		League cup (Note: Includes EFL Cup, Taça da Liga)		Other		Total	
Club	Season	Division	Apps	Goals	Apps	Goals	Apps	Goals	Apps	Goals	Apps	Goals
Sanjoanense	2014-15	Campeonato de Portugal	12	0	0	0	—		—		12	0
Liverpool	2016-17	Premier League	0	0	0	0	0	0	—		0	0
Wolves U23	2018-19	—			—		—		2 (Note: Appearance(s) in EFL Trophy)	0	2	0
Příbram	2019-20	Czech First League	1	0	0	0	—		—		1	0
Sanjoanense	2019-20	Campeonato de Portugal	9	1	0	0	—		—		9	1
Sanjoanense	2020-21	Campeonato de Portugal	26	3	1	0	—		—		27	3
Sanjoanense	Total		35	4	1	0	—		—		36	4
Felgueiras 1932	2021-22	Liga 3	23	0	1	0	—		—		24	0
Leixões	2022-23	Liga Portugal 2	16	1	1	0	4	0	—		21	1
Leixões	2023-24	Liga Portugal 2	15	0	0	0	2	0	—		17	0
Leixões	2024-25	Liga Portugal 2	15	2	1	0	0	0	—		16	2
Leixões	Total		46	3	2	0	6	0	—		54	3
Career total			117	7	4	0	6	0	2	0	129	7
