= FC Jumilla =

Coordinates: 38.471317°N 1.323244°W

Fútbol Club Jumilla
- Founded: 2011
- Dissolved: 2019
- Ground: La Hoya, Jumilla, Murcia, Spain
- Capacity: 3,000
Home colours	Away colours

Fútbol Club Jumilla was a Spanish football team based in Jumilla, in the autonomous community of Murcia. Founded in 2011, it played in Segunda División B – Group 4, holding home matches at Estadio Municipal de La Hoya. Between 2016 and 2019, its reserve team was Estudiantes de Murcia CF. In August 2019, unable to pay its debts, the club was dissolved.

== History ==
Founded in 2011, as a replacement to dissolved Jumilla CF, the club bought the place of Moratalla CF in Tercera División in the following year and was immediately included in the fourth level for the 2012–13 campaign. On 1 June 2015, after finishing first in its group, Jumilla was promoted to Segunda División B after defeating FC Ascó in the play-offs. In doing so, the club also qualified for the first time to the Copa del Rey, losing 2–1 in the first round away to Linares Deportivo on 2 September 2015.

In June 2016, Jumilla was taken over by Chinese football commentators Li Xiang and Tang Hui together with Argentinian partner Rubén Iglesias. Jumilla's game against Lorca FC in November 2016 was dubbed 'the Shanghai Derby' as both Li and Tang are from Shanghai, as is Lorca's owner – the former Chinese international player and manager Xu Genbao.

In August 2018, Jumilla entered into an agreement with Wolverhampton Wanderers, in which they would receive players on loan, in order to grant them first team experience.

The club was relegated to Tercera División via play-off defeat to Real Unión in June 2019, demoted one more level due to unpaid wages to its players, and dissolved in August.

== Season to season ==
Season	Tier	Division	Place	Copa del Rey
2012–13	4	3ª	4th	
2013–14	4	3ª	6th	
2014–15	4	3ª	1st	
2015–16	3	2ª B	15th	First round
2016–17	3	2ª B	10th	
2017–18	3	2ª B	13th	
2018–19	3	2ª B	16th	

- 4 seasons in Segunda División B
- 3 seasons in Tercera División
