= List of English football transfers summer 2016 =

This is a list of English football transfers for the 2016 summer transfer window. Only moves featuring at least one Premier League or Championship club are listed.

The summer transfer window began once clubs had concluded their final domestic fixture of the 2015–16 season, but many transfers only officially went through on 1 July because the majority of player contracts finished on 30 June. The window remained open until 18:00 BST on 1 September 2016. The window shut at 18:00 BST, this time due to the UEFA player registration deadlines for both the Champions League and Europa League ending at 23:00 BST, giving the six sides still in Europe time to conclude deals and register their player for continental matches if appropriate.

This list also includes transfers featuring at least one Premier League or Championship club which were completed after the end of the winter 2015–16 transfer window and before the end of the 2016 summer window.

Players without a club could join at any time, and clubs below Premier League level could sign players on loan during loan windows. Clubs could be permitted to sign a goalkeeper on an emergency loan if they had no registered goalkeeper available.

== Transfers ==
All clubs without a flag are English. Note that while Cardiff City and Swansea City are affiliated with the Football Association of Wales and thus take the Welsh flag, they play in the English football league system, and so their transfers are included here.

Date	Name	Moving from	Moving to	Fee
15 February 2016^{[b]}	(Cameroon) Joël Matip	(Germany) Schalke 04	Liverpool	Free
20 February 2016	(Portugal) Francisco Júnior	Everton	(Norway) Strømsgodset	Free
3 March 2016	(Sweden) Isak Ssewankambo	Derby County	(Norway) Molde	Undisclosed
9 March 2016	(England) Jack Barmby	Leicester City	(United States) Portland Timbers	Loan
11 March 2016^{[b]}	(Netherlands) Rajiv van La Parra	Wolverhampton Wanderers	Huddersfield Town	Undisclosed
15 March 2016	(Scotland) Alex Davey	Chelsea	(Norway) Stabæk	Loan
20 March 2016^{[c]}	(United States) Tim Howard	Everton	(United States) Colorado Rapids	Free
24 March 2016	(England) Max Clark	Hull City	Cambridge United	Loan
24 March 2016	(England) Tarique Fosu	Reading	Accrington Stanley	Loan
24 March 2016^{[b]}	(Argentina) Manuel Lanzini	(United Arab Emirates) Al-Jazira	West Ham United	Undisclosed
30 March 2016	(England) Freddie Ladapo	Margate	Crystal Palace	Undisclosed
31 March 2016	(Nigeria) Chidiebere Nwakali	Manchester City	(Norway) Start	Loan
6 April 2016^{[b]}	(Germany) Chris Löwe	(Germany) 1. FC Kaiserslautern	Huddersfield Town	Free
12 April 2016^{[a]}	(England) Jack Storer	Stevenage	Birmingham City	Undisclosed
14 April 2016	(England) Jake Kean	Norwich City	Swindon Town	Loan
20 April 2016^{[b]}	(Germany) Michael Hefele	(Germany) Dynamo Dresden	Huddersfield Town	Free
22 April 2016^{[b]}	(Spain) Toni Martínez	(Spain) Valencia	West Ham United	Undisclosed
12 May 2016	(England) Jonathan Edwards	Peterborough United	Hull City	Undisclosed
12 May 2016^{[b]}	(Netherlands) Lex Immers	(Netherlands) Feyenoord	(Wales) Cardiff City	Undisclosed
13 May 2016^{[b]}	(England) Jordan Rossiter	Liverpool	(Scotland) Rangers	£250,000
16 May 2016	(Norway) Håvard Nordtveit	(Germany) Borussia Mönchengladbach	West Ham United	Free
16 May 2016	(Wales) Chris Maxwell	Unattached	Preston North End	Free
16 May 2016^{[b]}	(England) Andy Yiadom	Barnet	Barnsley	Free
17 May 2016	(England) Andrew Dawber	Fulham	Altrincham	Undisclosed
18 May 2016	(Greece) Kostas Mitroglou	Fulham	(Portugal) Benfica	Undisclosed
18 May 2016	(England) Tommy Rowe	Wolverhampton Wanderers	Doncaster Rovers	Undisclosed
19 May 2016^{[b]}	(England) Luke Coddington	Unattached	Huddersfield Town	Free
19 May 2016	(Mexico) Miguel Layún	Watford	(Portugal) Porto	Undisclosed
20 May 2016^{[b]}	(England) Matthew Clarke	Ipswich Town	Portsmouth	Swap
20 May 2016	(Austria) Michael Madl	(Austria) Sturm Graz	Fulham	Undisclosed
20 May 2016^{[b]}	(England) Adam Webster	Portsmouth	Ipswich Town	Swap
23 May 2016^{[b]}	(England) Kaydon Jackson	(Wales) Wrexham	Barnsley	Free
24 May 2016^{[b]}	(Portugal) Eder	(Wales) Swansea City	(France) Lille	Undisclosed
24 May 2016	(England) Ben Pollock	Newcastle United	Hartlepool United	Free
24 May 2016^{[b]}	(Germany) Loris Karius	(Germany) Mainz 05	Liverpool	£4.7m
25 May 2016^{[b]}	(Netherlands) Danzell Gravenberch	(Netherlands) Dordrecht	Reading	Undisclosed
25 May 2016	(Croatia) Andrej Kramarić	Leicester City	(Germany) 1899 Hoffenheim	Undisclosed
25 May 2016^{[b]}	(Northern Ireland) Christopher Paul	Tottenham Hotspur	Queens Park Rangers	Free
25 May 2016^{[b]}	(Portugal) Domingos Quina	(Portugal) Benfica	West Ham United	Free
25 May 2016	(Switzerland) Granit Xhaka	(Germany) Borussia Mönchengladbach	Arsenal	£33.8m
26 May 2016	(Denmark) Viktor Fischer	(Netherlands) Ajax	Middlesbrough	£3.8m
30 May 2016^{[b]}	(England) Stephen Warnock	Unattached	Wigan Athletic	Free
2 June 2016^{[b]}	(England) Josh Brownhill	Preston North End	Bristol City	Undisclosed
2 June 2016	(Germany) İlkay Gündoğan	(Germany) Borussia Dortmund	Manchester City	£20m
3 June 2016	(Germany) Ron-Robert Zieler	(Germany) Hannover 96	Leicester City	Undisclosed
7 June 2016^{[b]}	(England) Joel Coleman	Oldham Athletic	Huddersfield Town	Undisclosed
7 June 2016^{[b]}	(Denmark) Simon Makienok	(Italy) Palermo	Preston North End	Loan
7 June 2016^{[b]}	(Croatia) Ivan Paurević	(Russia) Ufa	Huddersfield Town	Undisclosed
8 June 2016	(Ivory Coast) Eric Bailly	(Spain) Villarreal	Manchester United	Undisclosed
8 June 2016^{[b]}	(England) Andy Lonergan	Fulham	Wolverhampton Wanderers	Undisclosed
9 June 2016^{[b]}	(England) Luke Conlan	Burnley	Morecambe	Free
9 June 2016^{[b]}	(Spain) Juanmi	Southampton	(Spain) Real Sociedad	Undisclosed
9 June 2016^{[b]}	(Brazil) Nathan	Chelsea	(Netherlands) Vitesse	Loan
9 June 2016^{[b]}	(England) Gary O'Neil	Unattached	Bristol City	Free
10 June 2016^{[b]}	(England) Steve Sidwell	Unattached	Brighton & Hove Albion	Free
14 June 2016^{[b]}	(Algeria) Sofiane Feghouli	(Spain) Valencia	West Ham United	Free
14 June 2016^{[b]}	(Northern Ireland) Ben Hall	(Scotland) Motherwell	Brighton & Hove Albion	Undisclosed
14 June 2016^{[b]}	(Portugal) João Carlos Teixeira	Liverpool	(Portugal) Porto	£250,000
14 June 2016^{[b]}	(England) Harry White	Barnsley	Solihull Moors	Undisclosed
15 June 2016^{[b]}	(Colombia) Bernardo	(Spain) Sporting Gijón	Middlesbrough	Free
15 June 2016^{[b]}	(Croatia) Stipe Perica	Chelsea	(Italy) Udinese	Undisclosed
15 June 2016^{[b]}	(Colombia) Joao Rodríguez	Chelsea	(Colombia) Santa Fe	Loan
17 June 2016^{[b]}	(England) Ryan Huddart	Arsenal	Eastleigh	Loan
17 June 2016^{[b]}	(United States) Emerson Hyndman	Fulham	AFC Bournemouth	Free
17 June 2016^{[b]}	(Italy) Alberto Paloschi	(Wales) Swansea City	(Italy) Atalanta	Undisclosed
17 June 2016^{[b]}	(Republic of Ireland) Anthony Stokes	(Scotland) Celtic	Blackburn Rovers	Free
20 June 2016^{[b]}	(England) Tommy Elphick	AFC Bournemouth	Aston Villa	£3m
20 June 2016^{[b]}	(England) Jack Payne	Southend United	Huddersfield Town	Free
21 June 2016^{[b]}	(France) Seko Fofana	Manchester City	(Italy) Udinese	£3.8m
21 June 2016^{[b]}	(England) Alex Gilbey	Colchester United	Wigan Athletic	Undisclosed
21 June 2016^{[b]}	(Spain) Luis Hernández	(Spain) Sporting Gijón	Leicester City	Free
21 June 2016^{[b]}	(Scotland) Stephen Hendrie	West Ham United	Blackburn Rovers	Loan
21 June 2016^{[b]}	(England) George Moncur	Colchester United	Barnsley	£500,000
22 June 2016^{[b]}	(Poland) Ariel Borysiuk	(Poland) Legia Warsaw	Queens Park Rangers	Undisclosed
22 June 2016^{[b]}	(Belgium) Charly Musonda	Chelsea	(Spain) Real Betis	Loan
23 June 2016^{[b]}	(England) Mitchell Beeney	Chelsea	Crawley Town	Loan
23 June 2016^{[b]}	(England) Dan Burn	Unattached	Wigan Athletic	Free
23 June 2016^{[b]}	(England) Danny Graham	Unattached	Blackburn Rovers	Free
23 June 2016^{[b]}	(England) Ben Turner	Unattached	Burton Albion	Free
23 June 2016^{[b]}	(Kenya) Victor Wanyama	Southampton	Tottenham Hotspur	£11m
24 June 2016^{[b]}	(Germany) Yusuf Coban	Stoke City	(Germany) 1899 Hoffenheim	Free
24 June 2016^{[b]}	(Germany) Elias Kachunga	(Germany) FC Ingolstadt	Huddersfield Town	Loan
24 June 2016^{[b]}	(England) Elliot Lee	West Ham United	Barnsley	Undisclosed
24 June 2016^{[b]}	(Germany) Robert Tesche	Unattached	Birmingham City	Free
24 June 2016^{[b]}	(Brazil) Wallinho	(Brazil) São Paulo	Crystal Palace	Loan
25 June 2016^{[b]}	(England) Lewis Baker	Chelsea	(Netherlands) Vitesse	Loan
25 June 2016^{[b]}	(England) Liam Feeney	Bolton Wanderers	Blackburn Rovers	Free
25 June 2016^{[b]}	(England) Nathan Redmond	Norwich City	Southampton	£11m
27 June 2016^{[b]}	(Albania) Flo Bojaj	Huddersfield Town	(Scotland) Kilmarnock	Loan
27 June 2016^{[b]}	(England) Will Boyle	Huddersfield Town	(Scotland) Kilmarnock	Loan
27 June 2016^{[b]}	(England) Jonny Burn	Middlesbrough	(Scotland) Kilmarnock	Loan
27 June 2016^{[b]}	(Wales) Oliver Davies	(Wales) Swansea City	(Scotland) Kilmarnock	Loan
27 June 2016^{[b]}	(Republic of Ireland) Glen Rea	Brighton & Hove Albion	Luton Town	Undisclosed
27 June 2016^{[b]}	(England) Tommy Spurr	Unattached	Preston North End	Free
27 June 2016^{[b]}	(England) Mark Waddington	Stoke City	(Scotland) Kilmarnock	Loan
28 June 2016^{[b]}	(Sweden) Marcus Antonsson	(Sweden) Kalmar	Leeds United	£1.6m
28 June 2016^{[b]}	(France) Moussa Dembélé	Fulham	(Scotland) Celtic	Undisclosed
28 June 2016^{[b]}	(England) Paul Digby	Barnsley	Ipswich Town	Free
28 June 2016^{[b]}	(Scotland) Denny Johnstone	Birmingham City	Colchester United	Undisclosed
28 June 2016^{[b]}	(Senegal) Sadio Mané	Southampton	Liverpool	£34m
28 June 2016^{[b]}	(England) Jason McCarthy	Southampton	Walsall	Loan
28 June 2016^{[b]}	(England) Courtney Senior	Brentford	Colchester United	Free
29 June 2016^{[b]}	(Netherlands) Nathan Aké	Chelsea	AFC Bournemouth	Loan
29 June 2016^{[b]}	(Republic of Ireland) Jack Byrne	Manchester City	Blackburn Rovers	Loan
29 June 2016^{[b]}	(England) George Dobson	West Ham United	Walsall	Loan
29 June 2016^{[b]}	(Republic of Ireland) Eoin Doyle	(Wales) Cardiff City	Preston North End	Undisclosed
29 June 2016^{[b]}	(Wales) Joel Lynch	Huddersfield Town	Queens Park Rangers	Undisclosed
29 June 2016^{[b]}	(Germany) Christopher Schindler	(Germany) 1860 Munich	Huddersfield Town	£1.8m
29 June 2016^{[b]}	(Belgium) Matz Sels	(Belgium) Gent	Newcastle United	£5m
29 June 2016	(Spain) Raul Uche	(Spain) Rayo Vallecano	Leicester City	Undisclosed
29 June 2016^{[b]}	(Netherlands) Joey van den Berg	(Netherlands) Heerenveen	Reading	Free
30 June 2016^{[b]}	(England) Max Clark	Hull City	Cambridge United	Loan
30 June 2016^{[b]}	(Republic of Ireland) Anthony Forde	Walsall	Rotherham United	Undisclosed
30 June 2016^{[b]}	(England) Callam Jones	West Bromwich Albion	Accrington Stanley	Loan
30 June 2016^{[b]}	(France) Lys Mousset	(France) Le Havre	AFC Bournemouth	Undisclosed
30 June 2016	(Australia) Aaron Mooy	(Australia) Melbourne City	Manchester City	Free
30 June 2016^{[b]}	(England) Ryan Shotton	Derby County	Birmingham City	Undisclosed
30 June 2016^{[b]}	(England) Jerome Sinclair	Liverpool	Watford	£4m
1 July 2016	(Italy) Gabriele Angella	Watford	(Italy) Udinese	Undisclosed
1 July 2016	(Togo) Floyd Ayité	(France) Bastia	Fulham	Undisclosed
1 July 2016	(England) Kyle Bartley	(Wales) Swansea City	Leeds United	Loan
1 July 2016	(Italy) Giuseppe Bellusci	Leeds United	(Italy) Empoli	Loan
1 July 2016	(England) Dan Bentley	Southend United	Brentford	Free
1 July 2016	(England) Jake Bidwell	Brentford	Queens Park Rangers	Undisclosed
1 July 2016	(Spain) José Ángel Crespo	Aston Villa	(Greece) PAOK	Free
1 July 2016	(England) Daniel Crowley	Arsenal	Oxford United	Loan
1 July 2016	(Republic of Ireland) John Egan	Gillingham	Brentford	Free
1 July 2016	(Scotland) Steven Fletcher	Unattached	Sheffield Wednesday	Free
1 July 2016	(England) Dwight Gayle	Crystal Palace	Newcastle United	£10m
1 July 2016	(Benin) Frédéric Gounongbe	(Belgium) Westerlo	(Wales) Cardiff City	Free
1 July 2016	(Sweden) Zlatan Ibrahimović	(France) Paris Saint-Germain	Manchester United	Free
1 July 2016	(Belgium) Christian Kabasele	(Belgium) Genk	Watford	£6m
1 July 2016	(England) Kyle Knoyle	West Ham United	Wigan Athletic	Loan
1 July 2016	(France) Steve Mandanda	(France) Marseille	Crystal Palace	Undisclosed
1 July 2016	(Spain) Nolito	(Spain) Celta Vigo	Manchester City	£13.8m
1 July 2016	(Scotland) Matt Ritchie	AFC Bournemouth	Newcastle United	£12m
1 July 2016	(Saint Kitts and Nevis) Romaine Sawyers	Unattached	Brentford	Free
1 July 2016	(Wales) Liam Shephard	(Wales) Swansea City	Yeovil Town	Loan
1 July 2016	(Netherlands) Maarten Stekelenburg	Fulham	Everton	Undisclosed
1 July 2016	(Nigeria) Isaac Success	(Spain) Granada	Watford	£12.5m
1 July 2016	(England) Andros Townsend	Newcastle United	Crystal Palace	£13m
1 July 2016	(Argentina) Santiago Vergini	Sunderland	(Argentina) Boca Juniors	£1.5m
1 July 2016	(Chile) Lawrence Vigouroux	Liverpool	Swindon Town	£360,000
2 July 2016	(Denmark) Anders Lindegaard	West Bromwich Albion	Preston North End	Free
3 July 2016	(Japan) Takuma Asano	(Japan) Sanfrecce Hiroshima	Arsenal	Undisclosed
3 July 2016	(Belgium) Michy Batshuayi	(France) Marseille	Chelsea	£33.2m
3 July 2016	(France) Nampalys Mendy	(France) Nice	Leicester City	£13m
3 July 2016	(England) Glenn Murray	AFC Bournemouth	Brighton & Hove Albion	Loan
4 July 2016	(Spain) José Manuel Jurado	Watford	(Spain) Espanyol	Undisclosed
4 July 2016	(England) Rowan Liburd	Reading	Stevenage	Undisclosed
4 July 2016	(England) Ben Pringle	Fulham	Preston North End	Undisclosed
4 July 2016	(England) Callum Robinson	Aston Villa	Preston North End	Undisclosed
4 July 2016	(Denmark) Casper Sloth	Leeds United	(Denmark) AaB	Undisclosed
4 July 2016	(Ukraine) Oleksandr Zinchenko	(Russia) Ufa	Manchester City	Undisclosed
5 July 2016	(Argentina) Fabricio Coloccini	Newcastle United	(Argentina) San Lorenzo	Free
5 July 2016	(Netherlands) Marten de Roon	(Italy) Atalanta	Middlesbrough	£12m
5 July 2016	(Netherlands) Leroy Fer	Queens Park Rangers	(Wales) Swansea City	Undisclosed
5 July 2016	(Scotland) Jordan McGhee	(Scotland) Heart of Midlothian	Middlesbrough	Loan
5 July 2016	(France) Hadi Sacko	(Portugal) Sporting CP	Leeds United	Loan
5 July 2016	(England) Lee Tomlin	AFC Bournemouth	Bristol City	£3m
5 July 2016	(England) James Tomkins	West Ham United	Crystal Palace	£10m
6 July 2016	(France) Jérémie Boga	Chelsea	(Spain) Granada	Loan
6 July 2016	(England) Robert Green	Unattached	Leeds United	Free
6 July 2016	(Armenia) Henrikh Mkhitaryan	(Germany) Borussia Dortmund	Manchester United	Undisclosed
6 July 2016	(Australia) Aaron Mooy	Manchester City	Huddersfield Town	Loan
6 July 2016	(England) Deji Oshilaja	(Wales) Cardiff City	Gillingham	Loan
6 July 2016	(Scotland) Matt Phillips	Queens Park Rangers	West Bromwich Albion	£5.5m
6 July 2016	(France) Idriss Saadi	(Wales) Cardiff City	(Belgium) Kortrijk	Loan
6 July 2016	(Netherlands) Mike van der Hoorn	(Netherlands) Ajax	(Wales) Swansea City	Undisclosed
6 July 2016	(Denmark) Kenneth Zohore	(Belgium) Kortrijk	(Wales) Cardiff City	Undisclosed
7 July 2016	(England) Matt Grimes	(Wales) Swansea City	Leeds United	Loan
7 July 2016	(England) Kemar Roofe	Oxford United	Leeds United	£3m
7 July 2016	(Spain) Víctor Valdés	Unattached	Middlesbrough	Free
8 July 2016	(Nigeria) Sone Aluko	Unattached	Fulham	Free
8 July 2016	(England) Lewis Cook	Leeds United	AFC Bournemouth	Undisclosed
8 July 2016	(Spain) Jesús Gámez	(Spain) Atlético Madrid	Newcastle United	Free
8 July 2016	(Italy) Pierluigi Gollini	(Italy) Hellas Verona	Aston Villa	Undisclosed
8 July 2016	(Wales) Ryan Hedges	(Wales) Swansea City	Yeovil Town	Loan
8 July 2016	(Finland) Thomas Lam	(Netherlands) PEC Zwolle	Nottingham Forest	Free
8 July 2016	(France) Joseph Mendes	(France) Le Havre	Reading	Undisclosed
8 July 2016	(Nigeria) Ahmed Musa	(Russia) CSKA Moscow	Leicester City	£16.6m
8 July 2016	(England) Jack O'Connell	Brentford	Sheffield United	Undisclosed
8 July 2016	(England) Joe Quigley	AFC Bournemouth	Gillingham	Loan
8 July 2016	(Slovenia) Jon Gorenc Stanković	(Germany) Borussia Dortmund	Huddersfield Town	Undisclosed
9 July 2016	(Spain) Raúl Albentosa	Derby County	(Spain) Deportivo La Coruña	Undisclosed
9 July 2016	(Senegal) Papiss Cissé	Newcastle United	(China) Shandong Luneng Taishan	Undisclosed
9 July 2016	(Scotland) Lee Erwin	Leeds United	Oldham Athletic	Loan
9 July 2016	(England) Connor Ripley	Middlesbrough	Oldham Athletic	Loan
10 July 2016	(Scotland) Ryan Fulton	Liverpool	Chesterfield	Loan
10 July 2016	(England) Aaron Tshibola	Reading	Aston Villa	Undisclosed
11 July 2016	(Scotland) George Byers	Burnley	(Wales) Swansea City	Free
11 July 2016	(England) Isaac Hayden	Arsenal	Newcastle United	Undisclosed
11 July 2016	(Denmark) Pierre-Emile Højbjerg	(Germany) Bayern Munich	Southampton	£12.8m
11 July 2016	(Finland) Anssi Jaakkola	(South Africa) Ajax Cape Town	Reading	Undisclosed
11 July 2016	(Italy) Graziano Pellè	Southampton	(China) Shandong Luneng Taishan	£12m
11 July 2016	(Venezuela) Adalberto Peñaranda	Watford	(Italy) Udinese	Loan
11 July 2016	(Turkey) Gökhan Töre	(Turkey) Beşiktaş	West Ham United	Loan
11 July 2016	(Wales) Danny Ward	Liverpool	Huddersfield Town	Loan
12 July 2016	(England) Ashley Fletcher	Unattached	West Ham United	Free
12 July 2016	(England) Tyler Hornby-Forbes	Fleetwood Town	Brighton & Hove Albion	Undisclosed
12 July 2016	(Netherlands) Vincent Janssen	(Netherlands) AZ	Tottenham Hotspur	£17m
12 July 2016	(Slovakia) Filip Lesniak	Tottenham Hotspur	(Czech Republic) Slovan Liberec	Loan
12 July 2016	(England) Kyle McFadzean	Milton Keynes Dons	Burton Albion	Undisclosed
12 July 2016	(England) Nick Powell	Unattached	Wigan Athletic	Free
12 July 2016	(England) Tyler Reid	Manchester United	(Wales) Swansea City	Undisclosed
12 July 2016	(England) Joe Rothwell	Manchester United	Oxford United	Undisclosed
13 July 2016	(Spain) Sergi Canós	Liverpool	Norwich City	£2.5m
13 July 2016	(England) Jordan Cousins	Charlton Athletic	Queens Park Rangers	Undisclosed
13 July 2016	(Czech Republic) Tomáš Kalas	Chelsea	Fulham	Loan
13 July 2016	(Iceland) Hörður Magnússon	(Italy) Juventus	Bristol City	Undisclosed
13 July 2016	(Northern Ireland) Billy Mckay	Wigan Athletic	Oldham Athletic	Loan
13 July 2016	(England) Liam Smith	Newcastle United	Crewe Alexandra	Loan
14 July 2016	(Wales) Tom Bradshaw	Walsall	Barnsley	Undisclosed
14 July 2016	(Wales) Wes Burns	Bristol City	(Scotland) Aberdeen	Loan
14 July 2016	(England) Jordon Ibe	Liverpool	AFC Bournemouth	£15m
14 July 2016	(England) Elliot Kebbie	Salford City	Barnsley	Free
14 July 2016	(England) Dylan Mottley-Henry	Unattached	Barnsley	Free
14 July 2016	(Belgium) Denis Odoi	(Belgium) Lokeren	Fulham	Undisclosed
14 July 2016	(Republic of Ireland) Callum O'Dowda	Oxford United	Bristol City	£1m
14 July 2016	(Slovakia) Martin Škrtel	Liverpool	(Turkey) Fenerbahçe	£5.5m
14 July 2016	(England) John Swift	Unattached	Reading	Free
15 July 2016	(Spain) Antonio Barragán	(Spain) Valencia	Middlesbrough	Undisclosed
15 July 2016	(Netherlands) Roy Beerens	(Germany) Hertha BSC	Reading	Undisclosed
15 July 2016	(England) Jordy Hiwula	Huddersfield Town	Bradford City	Loan
15 July 2016	(Australia) Jackson Irvine	(Scotland) Ross County	Burton Albion	Undisclosed
15 July 2016	(England) Kasey Palmer	Chelsea	Huddersfield Town	Loan
15 July 2016	(Spain) Jon Toral	Arsenal	(Spain) Granada	Loan
16 July 2016	(Italy) Emanuele Giaccherini	Sunderland	(Italy) Napoli	Undisclosed
16 July 2016	(France) N'Golo Kanté	Leicester City	Chelsea	£32m
16 July 2016	(England) Remi Matthews	Norwich City	(Scotland) Hamilton Academical	Loan
16 July 2016	(England) Chris O'Grady	Brighton & Hove Albion	Burton Albion	Loan
16 July 2016	(Colombia) Juan Camilo Zúñiga	(Italy) Napoli	Watford	Loan
16 July 2016	(Wales) Lewis Price	Unattached	Rotherham United	Free
18 July 2016	(Australia) Mark Birighitti	(Australia) Newcastle Jets	(Wales) Swansea City	Free
18 July 2016	(Australia) Cameron Burgess	Fulham	Oldham Athletic	Loan
18 July 2016	(England) Tom Dallison	Brighton & Hove Albion	Cambridge United	Loan
18 July 2016	(England) Jake Kean	Norwich City	Sheffield Wednesday	Free
18 July 2016	(Uruguay) Gastón Ramírez	Unattached	Middlesbrough	Free
18 July 2016	(Brazil) Wellington Silva	Arsenal	(Brazil) Fluminense	Undisclosed
19 July 2016	(England) Nick Pope	Charlton Athletic	Burnley	Undisclosed
19 July 2016	(Iceland) Jóhann Berg Guðmundsson	Charlton Athletic	Burnley	Undisclosed
19 July 2016	(England) David Button	Brentford	Fulham	Undisclosed
19 July 2016	(England) Scott Malone	(Wales) Cardiff City	Fulham	Swap
19 July 2016	(Northern Ireland) Michael McGovern	(Scotland) Hamilton Academical	Norwich City	Free
19 July 2016	(Wales) Jazz Richards	Fulham	(Wales) Cardiff City	Swap
20 July 2016	(Hungary) Ádám Bogdán	Liverpool	Wigan Athletic	Loan
20 July 2016	(England) Jake Forster-Caskey	Brighton & Hove Albion	Rotherham United	Free
20 July 2016	(England) Alex Kiwomya	Chelsea	Crewe Alexandra	Loan
20 July 2016	(Estonia) Ragnar Klavan	(Germany) FC Augsburg	Liverpool	£4.2m
20 July 2016	(Spain) Álvaro Negredo	(Spain) Valencia	Middlesbrough	Loan
21 July 2016	(Ivory Coast) Brice Dja Djédjé	(France) Marseille	Watford	Undisclosed
21 July 2016	(Scotland) Grant Hanley	Blackburn Rovers	Newcastle United	Undisclosed
22 July 2016	(Venezuela) Fernando Amorebieta	Fulham	(Spain) Sporting Gijón	Undisclosed
22 July 2016	(Ivory Coast) Victorien Angban	Chelsea	(Spain) Granada	Loan
22 July 2016	(Croatia) Matej Delač	Chelsea	(Belgium) Royal Excel Mouscron	Loan
22 July 2016	(Spain) Carles Gil	Aston Villa	(Spain) Deportivo La Coruña	Loan
22 July 2016	(Republic of Ireland) Stephen Henderson	Charlton Athletic	Nottingham Forest	Free
22 July 2016	(England) Rob Holding	Bolton Wanderers	Arsenal	£2m
22 July 2016	(England) Kayden Jackson	Barnsley	Grimsby Town	Loan
22 July 2016	(Austria) Alex Manninger	(Germany) FC Augsburg	Liverpool	Free
22 July 2016	(Scotland) Kevin McDonald	Wolverhampton Wanderers	Fulham	Undisclosed
22 July 2016	(Portugal) Hildeberto Pereira	(Portugal) Benfica	Nottingham Forest	Loan
22 July 2016	(Poland) Damien Perquis	Unattached	Nottingham Forest	Free
22 July 2016	(England) Will Vaulks	(Scotland) Falkirk	Rotherham United	Undisclosed
22 July 2016	(England) Danny Whitehead	Wigan Athletic	Cheltenham Town	Loan
22 July 2016	(Netherlands) Georginio Wijnaldum	Newcastle United	Liverpool	£25m
23 July 2016	(Uruguay) Guillermo Varela	Manchester United	(Germany) Eintracht Frankfurt	Loan
25 July 2016	(Wales) Joe Allen	Liverpool	Stoke City	£13m
25 July 2016	(Republic of Ireland) Ryan Delaney	Unattached	Burton Albion	Free
25 July 2016	(England) Lloyd Dyer	Unattached	Burton Albion	Free
25 July 2016	(England) Sanmi Odelusi	Wigan Athletic	Rochdale	Loan
25 July 2016	(Egypt) Ramadan Sobhi	(Egypt) Al Ahly	Stoke City	£5m
25 July 2016	(Jamaica) Lee Williamson	Unattached	Burton Albion	Free
26 July 2016	(England) Jake Buxton	Derby County	Wigan Athletic	Undisclosed
26 July 2016	(England) Harry Cornick	AFC Bournemouth	Leyton Orient	Loan
26 July 2016	(England) Ryan Kent	Liverpool	Barnsley	Loan
27 July 2016	(England) Dennon Lewis	Watford	Woking	Loan
27 July 2016	(Austria) Ivan Lučić	(Germany) Bayern Munich	Bristol City	Undisclosed
27 July 2016	(Belgium) Obbi Oularé	Watford	(Belgium) Zulte Waregem	Loan
27 July 2016	(Australia) Brad Smith	Liverpool	AFC Bournemouth	£3m
28 July 2016	(Switzerland) Almen Abdi	Watford	Sheffield Wednesday	Undisclosed
28 July 2016	(England) Josh Ginnelly	Burnley	Walsall	Loan
28 July 2016	(Republic of Ireland) Sean Long	Reading	Cambridge United	Loan
28 July 2016	(Wales) Adam Matthews	Sunderland	Bristol City	Loan
28 July 2016	(Czech Republic) Daniel Pudil	Watford	Sheffield Wednesday	Undisclosed
28 July 2016	(Wales) Tyler Roberts	West Bromwich Albion	Oxford United	Loan
28 July 2016	(Netherlands) Ricky van Wolfswinkel	Norwich City	(Netherlands) Vitesse	Undisclosed
29 July 2016	(Argentina) Paulo Gazzaniga	Southampton	(Spain) Rayo Vallecano	Loan
29 July 2016	(France) Bafétimbi Gomis	(Wales) Swansea City	(France) Marseille	Loan
29 July 2016	(United States) Brad Guzan	Aston Villa	Middlesbrough	Free
29 July 2016	(Portugal) Hélder Costa	(Portugal) Benfica	Wolverhampton Wanderers	Loan
29 July 2016	(England) Macaulay Gillesphey	Newcastle United	Carlisle United	Loan
29 July 2016	(Netherlands) Kenji Gorré	(Wales) Swansea City	Northampton Town	Loan
29 July 2016	(Ivory Coast) Yakou Méïte	(France) Paris Saint-Germain	Reading	Undisclosed
29 July 2016	(Senegal) Armand Traoré	Unattached	Nottingham Forest	Free
29 July 2016	(Wales) George Williams	Fulham	Milton Keynes Dons	Loan
30 July 2016	(England) Jack Dunn	Liverpool	Morecambe	Loan
30 July 2016	(Australia) Callum Elder	Leicester City	Brentford	Loan
30 July 2016	(Portugal) Sílvio	(Spain) Atlético Madrid	Wolverhampton Wanderers	Undisclosed
1 August 2016	(Netherlands) Steven Berghuis	Watford	(Netherlands) Feyenoord	Loan
1 August 2016	(Spain) Pablo Hernández	(Qatar) Al-Arabi	Leeds United	Loan
1 August 2016	(England) Alex McCarthy	Crystal Palace	Southampton	Undisclosed
1 August 2016	(France) Jérémy Pied	(France) Nice	Southampton	Free
1 August 2016	(England) Grant Ward	Tottenham Hotspur	Ipswich Town	Undisclosed
2 August 2016	(England) Jerome Binnom-Williams	Crystal Palace	Peterborough United	Undisclosed
2 August 2016	(Iceland) Jón Daði Böðvarsson	(Germany) 1. FC Kaiserslautern	Wolverhampton Wanderers	Undisclosed
2 August 2016	(Scotland) Gordon Greer	Unattached	Blackburn Rovers	Free
2 August 2016	(Senegal) Idrissa Gueye	Aston Villa	Everton	£7.1m
2 August 2016	(England) Angus MacDonald	Torquay United	Barnsley	Undisclosed
2 August 2016	(Ghana) Baba Rahman	Chelsea	(Germany) Schalke 04	Loan
2 August 2016	(England) Declan Rudd	Norwich City	Charlton Athletic	Loan
2 August 2016	(Germany) Leroy Sané	(Germany) Schalke 04	Manchester City	£37m
2 August 2016	(Portugal) João Teixeira	(Portugal) Benfica	Wolverhampton Wanderers	Loan
2 August 2016	(England) Kelvin Wilson	Unattached	Rotherham United	Free
3 August 2016	(Republic of Ireland) Ciaran Clark	Aston Villa	Newcastle United	£5m
3 August 2016	(Senegal) Mohamed Diamé	Hull City	Newcastle United	Undisclosed
3 August 2016	(Argentina) Federico Fazio	Tottenham Hotspur	(Italy) Roma	Loan
3 August 2016	(Peru) Paolo Hurtado	Reading	(Portugal) Vitória de Guimarães	Loan
3 August 2016	(Brazil) Gabriel Jesus	(Brazil) Palmeiras	Manchester City	£27m
3 August 2016	(Poland) Bartosz Kapustka	(Poland) Cracovia	Leicester City	£7.5m
3 August 2016	(Switzerland) Pajtim Kasami	(Greece) Olympiacos	Nottingham Forest	Loan
3 August 2016	(England) Lee Nicholls	Wigan Athletic	Milton Keynes Dons	Undisclosed
3 August 2016	(Egypt) Mohamed Salah	Chelsea	(Italy) Roma	Undisclosed
3 August 2016	(England) Jon Taylor	Peterborough United	Rotherham United	£500,000
3 August 2016	(Northern Ireland) Oliver Norwood	Reading	Brighton & Hove Albion	Undisclosed
4 August 2016	(Scotland) Scott Allan	(Scotland) Celtic	Rotherham United	Loan
4 August 2016	(England) Conor Grant	Everton	Ipswich Town	Loan
4 August 2016	(England) Paul Jones	Portsmouth	Norwich City	Free
4 August 2016	(Scotland) Ross McCormack	Fulham	Aston Villa	£12m
4 August 2016	(England) Jason Pearce	Wigan Athletic	Charlton Athletic	Undisclosed
4 August 2016	(England) Alex Pritchard	Tottenham Hotspur	Norwich City	Undisclosed
4 August 2016	(England) Easah Suliman	Aston Villa	Cheltenham Town	Loan
4 August 2016	(Poland) Wojciech Szczęsny	Arsenal	(Italy) Roma	Loan
4 August 2016	(France) Florian Thauvin	Newcastle United	(France) Marseille	Loan
5 August 2016	(England) Tammy Abraham	Chelsea	Bristol City	Loan
5 August 2016	(Brazil) Allan	Liverpool	(Germany) Hertha BSC	Loan
5 August 2016	(England) Will Buckley	Sunderland	Sheffield Wednesday	Loan
5 August 2016	(England) Matt Butcher	AFC Bournemouth	Yeovil Town	Loan
5 August 2016	(England) Michael Cain	Leicester City	Blackpool	Loan
5 August 2016	(England) Tahvon Campbell	West Bromwich Albion	Yeovil Town	Loan
5 August 2016	(Senegal) Papy Djilobodji	Chelsea	Sunderland	£8m
5 August 2016	(England) Michael Doughty	Queens Park Rangers	Swindon Town	Loan
5 August 2016	(England) Jay Emmanuel-Thomas	Queens Park Rangers	Gillingham	Loan
5 August 2016	(England) Russell Griffiths	Everton	Cheltenham Town	Loan
5 August 2016	(England) Callum Harriott	Charlton Athletic	Reading	Undisclosed
5 August 2016	(England) Jon Flanagan	Liverpool	Burnley	Loan
5 August 2016	(England) Lloyd Jones	Liverpool	Swindon Town	Loan
5 August 2016	(Scotland) Adam King	(Wales) Swansea City	Southend United	Loan
5 August 2016	(Spain) Fernando Llorente	(Spain) Sevilla	(Wales) Swansea City	Undisclosed
5 August 2016	(England) Ryan Sweeney	Wimbledon	Stoke City	Undisclosed
6 August 2016	(England) Hamza Choudhury	Leicester City	Burton Albion	Loan
6 August 2016	(England) Jordan Houghton	Chelsea	Doncaster Rovers	Loan
6 August 2016	(Colombia) Marlos Moreno	(Colombia) Atlético Nacional	Manchester City	£4.75m
6 August 2016	(Colombia) Marlos Moreno	Manchester City	(Spain) Deportivo La Coruña	Loan
7 August 2016	(England) Scott Sinclair	Aston Villa	(Scotland) Celtic	Undisclosed
8 August 2016	(England) Che Adams	Sheffield United	Birmingham City	Undisclosed
8 August 2016	(Ghana) André Ayew	(Wales) Swansea City	West Ham United	£20.5m
8 August 2016	(Republic of Ireland) Josh Cullen	West Ham United	Bradford City	Loan
8 August 2016	(England) Jordan Green	AFC Bournemouth	(Wales) Newport County	Loan
8 August 2016	(France) Arthur Masuaku	(Greece) Olympiakos	West Ham United	£6m
8 August 2016	(Wales) Lewin Nyatanga	Barnsley	Northampton Town	Loan
8 August 2016	(Republic of Ireland) John O'Sullivan	Blackburn Rovers	Accrington Stanley	Loan
8 August 2016	(England) Josh Pask	West Ham United	Gillingham	Loan
8 August 2016	(Wales) Josh Sheehan	(Wales) Swansea City	(Wales) Newport County	Loan
8 August 2016	(England) Ivan Toney	Newcastle United	Shrewsbury Town	Loan
9 August 2016	(England) Cameron Dawson	Sheffield Wednesday	Wycombe Wanderers	Loan
9 August 2016	(England) Lewis Page	West Ham United	Coventry City	Loan
9 August 2016	(France) Paul Pogba	(Italy) Juventus	Manchester United	£89m
9 August 2016	(England) John Stones	Everton	Manchester City	£47.5m
10 August 2016	(England) Darnell Fisher	(Scotland) Celtic	Rotherham United	Undisclosed
10 August 2016	(Colombia) Carlos Sánchez	Aston Villa	(Italy) Fiorentina	Loan
10 August 2016	(England) Andrew Taylor	Wigan Athletic	Bolton Wanderers	Loan
10 August 2016	(Wales) Ashley Williams	(Wales) Swansea City	Everton	£12m
11 August 2016	(England) Kieran Agard	Bristol City	Milton Keynes Dons	Undisclosed
11 August 2016	(England) Luke Ayling	Bristol City	Leeds United	Undisclosed
11 August 2016	(Spain) Borja	(Spain) Atlético Madrid	(Wales) Swansea City	£15m
11 August 2016	(Democratic Republic of the Congo) Jordan Botaka	Leeds United	Charlton Athletic	Loan
11 August 2016	(Argentina) Jonathan Calleri	(Uruguay) Deportivo Maldonado	West Ham United	Loan
11 August 2016f	(Benin) Sessi D'Almeida	(France) Paris Saint-Germain	Barnsley	Free
11 August 2016	(Scotland) Alex Davey	Chelsea	Crawley Town	Loan
11 August 2016	(England) Sam Gallagher	Southampton	Blackburn Rovers	Loan
11 August 2016^{[d]}	(Scotland) Donald Love	Manchester United	Sunderland	£1m
11 August 2016^{[d]}	(Northern Ireland) Paddy McNair	Manchester United	Sunderland	£4.5m
12 August 2016	(England) Dominic Ball	Tottenham Hotspur	Rotherham United	Undisclosed
12 August 2016	(England) Harry Chapman	Middlesbrough	Sheffield United	Loan
12 August 2016	(Wales) James Chester	West Bromwich Albion	Aston Villa	Undisclosed
12 August 2016	(Brazil) Fábio	(Wales) Cardiff City	Middlesbrough	£2m
12 August 2016	(Denmark) Elias Fritjof Sørensen	(Denmark) HB Køge	Newcastle United	Undisclosed
12 August 2016	(England) Darnell Furlong	Queens Park Rangers	Swindon Town	Loan
12 August 2016	(England) George Green	Burnley	(Scotland) Kilmarnock	Loan
12 August 2016	(Wales) Emyr Huws	Wigan Athletic	(Wales) Cardiff City	Undisclosed
12 August 2016	(Belgium) Adnan Januzaj	Manchester United	Sunderland	Loan
12 August 2016	(England) Alex Jones	Birmingham City	Port Vale	Loan
12 August 2016	(Spain) Jozabed	(Spain) Rayo Vallecano	Fulham	Undisclosed
12 August 2016	(England) Chris Long	Burnley	Fleetwood Town	Loan
12 August 2016	(Serbia) Danilo Pantić	Chelsea	(Netherlands) Excelsior	Loan
12 August 2016	(Scotland) Greg Stewart	(Scotland) Dundee	Birmingham City	£500,000
12 August 2016	(Burkina Faso) Bertrand Traoré	Chelsea	(Netherlands) Ajax	Loan
12 August 2016	(England) Luke Varney	Unattached	Ipswich Town	Free
13 August 2016	(Netherlands) Dorus de Vries	Nottingham Forest	(Scotland) Celtic	Undisclosed
13 August 2016	(England) George Glendon	Manchester City	Fleetwood Town	Loan
13 August 2016	(Wales) Shaun MacDonald	AFC Bournemouth	Wigan Athletic	Undisclosed
14 August 2016	(Jamaica) Michael Hector	Chelsea	(Germany) Eintracht Frankfurt	Loan
15 August 2016	(England) Jamal Blackman	Chelsea	Wycombe Wanderers	Loan
15 August 2016	(Democratic Republic of the Congo) Yannick Bolasie	Crystal Palace	Everton	£25m
15 August 2016	(England) Izzy Brown	Chelsea	Rotherham United	Loan
15 August 2016	(Morocco) Moha El Ouriachi	Stoke City	Shrewsbury Town	Loan
15 August 2016	(England) Connor Hunte	Wolverhampton Wanderers	Stevenage	Loan
15 August 2016	(Republic of the Congo) Prince Oniangué	(France) Stade Reims	Wolverhampton Wanderers	Undisclosed
15 August 2016	(England) Jordan Turnbull	Southampton	Coventry City	Undisclosed
15 August 2016	(England) George Waring	Stoke City	Shrewsbury Town	Loan
15 August 2016	(Republic of Ireland) Marc Wilson	Stoke City	AFC Bournemouth	£2m
16 August 2016	(Scotland) Liam Bridcutt	Sunderland	Leeds United	Undisclosed
16 August 2016	(Belgium) Steven Defour	(Belgium) Anderlecht	Burnley	£7.35m
16 August 2016	(England) Luke Garbutt	Everton	Wigan Athletic	Loan
16 August 2016	(England) David Jones	Burnley	Sheffield Wednesday	Undisclosed
16 August 2016	(Poland) Vincent Rabiega	(Germany) RB Leipzig	Bradford City	Free
16 August 2016	(Spain) Mario Suárez	Watford	(Spain) Valencia	Loan
17 August 2016	(Wales) Chris Dawson	Rotherham United	(Norway) Viking	Loan
17 August 2016	(Spain) Jordi Gómez	Sunderland	Wigan Athletic	Free
17 August 2016	(Australia) Mile Jedinak	Crystal Palace	Aston Villa	Undisclosed
18 August 2016	(England) Tom Adeyemi	(Wales) Cardiff City	Rotherham United	Loan
18 August 2016	(England) Dan Agyei	Burnley	Coventry City	Loan
18 August 2016	(Australia) Jason Davidson	Huddersfield Town	(Netherlands) Groningen	Loan
18 August 2016	(Sweden) Pontus Jansson	(Italy) Torino	Leeds United	Loan
18 August 2016	(England) Craig Tanner	Reading	Plymouth Argyle	Loan
18 August 2016	(Liechtenstein) Sandro Wieser	(Switzerland) Thun	Reading	Free
19 August 2016	(Ghana) Koby Arthur	Birmingham City	Cheltenham Town	Loan
19 August 2016	(England) Phil Edwards	Burton Albion	Oxford United	Loan
19 August 2016	(England) Luke Hendrie	Burnley	(Scotland) Kilmarnock	Loan
19 August 2016	(France) Younès Kaboul	Sunderland	Watford	£4m
19 August 2016	(United States) Jack McBean	(United States) LA Galaxy	Reading	Loan
19 August 2016	(England) Simon Moore	(Wales) Cardiff City	Sheffield United	Undisclosed
19 August 2016	(Argentina) Roberto Pereyra	(Italy) Juventus	Watford	£12m
19 August 2016	(South Africa) Steven Pienaar	Unattached	Sunderland	Free
19 August 2016	(France) Vincent Sasso	(Portugal) Braga	Sheffield Wednesday	Undisclosed
20 August 2016	(Belgium) Christian Benteke	Liverpool	Crystal Palace	£27m
20 August 2016	(England) John Brayford	Sheffield United	Burton Albion	Loan
20 August 2016	(England) Joe Garner	Preston North End	(Scotland) Rangers	Undisclosed
20 August 2016	(England) Liam Moore	Leicester City	Reading	Undisclosed
20 August 2016	(England) James Wilson	Manchester United	Derby County	Loan
20 August 2016	(England) Martyn Woolford	Sheffield United	Fleetwood Town	Free
21 August 2016	(Costa Rica) Joel Campbell	Arsenal	(Portugal) Sporting CP	Loan
22 August 2016	(England) Tyler Blackett	Manchester United	Reading	Undisclosed
22 August 2016	(England) Cameron Borthwick-Jackson	Manchester United	Wolverhampton Wanderers	Loan
22 August 2016	(Netherlands) Siem de Jong	Newcastle United	(Netherlands) PSV Eindhoven	Loan
22 August 2016	(England) Brendan Galloway	Everton	West Bromwich Albion	Loan
22 August 2016	(Germany) Rouwen Hennings	Burnley	(Germany) Fortuna Düsseldorf	Loan
22 August 2016	(Netherlands) Ola John	(Portugal) Benfica	Wolverhampton Wanderers	Loan
23 August 2016	(Belgium) Ritchie De Laet	Leicester City	Aston Villa	Undisclosed
23 August 2016	(Germany) Marko Marin	Chelsea	(Greece) Olympiacos	£2.5m
23 August 2016	(Switzerland) Kevin Mbabu	Newcastle United	(Switzerland) Young Boys	Loan
22 August 2016	(Brazil) Andreas Pereira	Manchester United	(Spain) Granada	Loan
23 August 2016	(Iceland) Ragnar Sigurðsson	(Russia) Krasnodar	Fulham	Undisclosed
24 August 2016	(Wales) Simon Church	Milton Keynes Dons	(Netherlands) Roda JC	Undisclosed
24 August 2016	(England) Tareiq Holmes-Dennis	Charlton Athletic	Huddersfield Town	Undisclosed
24 August 2016	(Netherlands) Daryl Janmaat	Newcastle United	Watford	Undisclosed
24 August 2016	(Netherlands) Kelle Roos	Derby County	Bristol Rovers	Loan
24 August 2016	(Senegal) Henri Saivet	Newcastle United	(France) Saint-Étienne	Loan
24 August 2016	(Serbia) Vladimir Stojković	(Israel) Maccabi Haifa	Nottingham Forest	Undisclosed
24 August 2016	(England) James Vaughan	Birmingham City	Bury	Free
24 August 2016	(France) Jordan Veretout	Aston Villa	(France) Saint-Étienne	Loan
24 August 2016	(United States) DeAndre Yedlin	Tottenham Hotspur	Newcastle United	£5m
25 August 2016	(England) Marcus Beauchamp	Norwich City	(Wales) Newport County	Free
25 August 2016	(Algeria) Nabil Bentaleb	Tottenham Hotspur	(Germany) Schalke 04	Loan
25 August 2016	(Chile) Claudio Bravo	(Spain) Barcelona	Manchester City	£15.4m
25 August 2016	(England) Calum Butcher	Burton Albion	Millwall	Free
25 August 2016	(England) Harry Campbell	Bolton Wanderers	Burton Albion	Free
25 August 2016	(Kosovo) Bersant Celina	Manchester City	(Netherlands) FC Twente	Loan
25 August 2016	(England) Henry Cowans	Aston Villa	Stevenage	Loan
25 August 2016	(England) Robert Dickie	Reading	Cheltenham Town	Loan
25 August 2016	(Portugal) Eduardo	(Croatia) Dinamo Zagreb	Chelsea	Undisclosed
25 August 2016	(Switzerland) Edimilson Fernandes	(Switzerland) Sion	West Ham United	£5.5m
25 August 2016	(England) Sam Hart	Liverpool	Port Vale	Loan
25 August 2016	(Netherlands) Tim Krul	Newcastle United	(Netherlands) Ajax	Loan
25 August 2016	(England) Ryan Ledson	Everton	Oxford United	Undisclosed
25 August 2016	(Spain) Javier Manquillo	(Spain) Atlético Madrid	Sunderland	Loan
25 August 2016	(England) William Miller	Tottenham Hotspur	Burton Albion	Loan
25 August 2016	(England) Taylor Moore	(France) Lens	Bristol City	Undisclosed
25 August 2016	(Wales) Connor Roberts	(Wales) Swansea City	Bristol Rovers	Loan
25 August 2016	(Norway) Martin Samuelsen	West Ham United	Blackburn Rovers	Loan
25 August 2016	(England) Ben Whitfield	AFC Bournemouth	Yeovil Town	Loan
26 August 2016	(England) Ben Amos	Bolton Wanderers	(Wales) Cardiff City	Loan
26 August 2016	(Japan) Takuma Asano	Arsenal	(Germany) VfB Stuttgart	Loan
26 August 2016	(England) Shaun Barker	Unattached	Burton Albion	Free
26 August 2016	(England) Joe Bennett	Aston Villa	(Wales) Cardiff City	Undisclosed
26 August 2016	(Burundi) Gaël Bigirimana	Newcastle United	Coventry City	Undisclosed
26 August 2016	(England) Jonathan Bond	Reading	Gillingham	Loan
26 August 2016	(Republic of Ireland) Shane Duffy	Blackburn Rovers	Brighton & Hove Albion	Undisclosed
26 August 2016	(Netherlands) Paul Gladon	(Netherlands) Heracles Almelo	Wolverhampton Wanderers	Undisclosed
26 August 2016	(Republic of Ireland) Tommie Hoban	Watford	Blackburn Rovers	Loan
26 August 2016	(Norway) Stefan Johansen	(Scotland) Celtic	Fulham	Undisclosed
26 August 2016	(Democratic Republic of the Congo) Neeskens Kebano	(Belgium) Genk	Fulham	Undisclosed
26 August 2016	(England) Stuart Taylor	Unattached	Southampton	Free
26 August 2016	(Republic of Ireland) Kevin Toner	Aston Villa	Walsall	Loan
26 August 2016	(Republic of Ireland) Derrick Williams	Bristol City	Blackburn Rovers	Undisclosed
26 August 2016	(Ukraine) Oleksandr Zinchenko	Manchester City	(Netherlands) PSV	Loan
27 August 2016	(England) Joe Bennett	Aston Villa	(Wales) Cardiff City	Free
27 August 2016	(Denmark) Jores Okore	Aston Villa	(Denmark) Copenhagen	Undisclosed
27 August 2016	(Croatia) Mario Pašalić	Chelsea	(Italy) Milan	Loan
27 August 2016	(England) Jamie Paterson	Nottingham Forest	Bristol City	Undisclosed
27 August 2016	(Czech Republic) Matěj Vydra	Watford	Derby County	£8m
28 August 2016	(Scotland) Oliver Burke	Nottingham Forest	(Germany) RB Leipzig	£13m
28 August 2016	(Morocco) Achraf Lazaar	(Italy) Palermo	Newcastle United	Undisclosed
28 August 2016	(Republic of Ireland) Daryl Murphy	Ipswich Town	Newcastle United	£3m
28 August 2016	(Italy) Simone Zaza	(Italy) Juventus	West Ham United	Loan
29 August 2016	(Morocco) Sofiane Boufal	(France) Lille	Southampton	£16m
29 August 2016	(Belgium) Nacer Chadli	Tottenham Hotspur	West Bromwich Albion	£13m
29 August 2016	(England) Kyle Dempsey	Huddersfield Town	Fleetwood Town	Loan
29 August 2016	(England) Joleon Lescott	Aston Villa	(Greece) AEK Athens	Free
29 August 2016	(Italy) Stefano Okaka	(Belgium) Anderlecht	Watford	Undisclosed
30 August 2016	(England) Adam Armstrong	Newcastle United	Barnsley	Loan
30 August 2016	(England) Patrick Bamford	Chelsea	Burnley	Loan
30 August 2016	(Republic of Ireland) Leon Best	Unattached	Ipswich Town	Free
30 August 2016	(England) Reece Burke	West Ham United	Wigan Athletic	Loan
30 August 2016	(England) Calum Chambers	Arsenal	Middlesbrough	Loan
30 August 2016	(England) Adam Chicksen	Unattached	Charlton Athletic	Free
30 August 2016	(England) Bradley Fewster	Middlesbrough	Hartlepool United	Loan
30 August 2016	(Costa Rica) Cristian Gamboa	West Bromwich Albion	(Scotland) Celtic	Undisclosed
30 August 2016	(England) Brad Halliday	Middlesbrough	Cambridge United	Undisclosed
30 August 2016	(England) Tom Heardman	Newcastle United	Hartlepool United	Loan
30 August 2016	(England) Adam Jackson	Middlesbrough	Barnsley	Undisclosed
30 August 2016	(England) Will Keane	Manchester United	Hull City	Undisclosed
30 August 2016	(Brazil) Kenedy	Chelsea	Watford	Loan
30 August 2016	(England) Jack King	Scunthorpe United	Stevenage	Loan
30 August 2016	(Ivory Coast) Jonathan Kodjia	Bristol City	Aston Villa	£11m
30 August 2016	(England) Freddie Ladapo	Crystal Palace	Oldham Athletic	Loan
30 August 2016	(Northern Ireland) Caolan Lavery	Sheffield Wednesday	Sheffield United	Undisclosed
30 August 2016	(Wales) Tom Lawrence	Leicester City	Ipswich Town	Loan
30 August 2016	(Netherlands) Jeremain Lens	Sunderland	(Turkey) Fenerbahçe	Loan
30 August 2016	(Jamaica) Adrian Mariappa	Unattached	Watford	Free
30 August 2016	(Scotland) David Marshall	(Wales) Cardiff City	Hull City	Undisclosed
30 August 2016	(England) Ryan Mason	Tottenham Hotspur	Hull City	Undisclosed
30 August 2016	(England) Alfie Mawson	Barnsley	(Wales) Swansea City	£5m
30 August 2016	(Germany) Shkodran Mustafi	(Spain) Valencia	Arsenal	£35m
30 August 2016	(Portugal) Nélson Oliveira	(Portugal) Benfica	Norwich City	Undisclosed
30 August 2016	(Spain) Lucas Pérez	(Spain) Deportivo La Coruña	Arsenal	£17.1m
30 August 2016	(France) Loïc Rémy	Chelsea	Crystal Palace	Loan
30 August 2016	(Morocco) Romain Saïss	(France) Angers	Wolverhampton Wanderers	Undisclosed
30 August 2016	(Guinea) Idrissa Sylla	(Belgium) Anderlecht	Queens Park Rangers	Undisclosed
31 August 2016	(Ghana) Albert Adomah	Middlesbrough	Aston Villa	Undisclosed
31 August 2016	(Spain) Luis Alberto	Liverpool	(Italy) Lazio	£4.3m
31 August 2016	(Spain) Marcos Alonso	(Italy) Fiorentina	Chelsea	£23m
31 August 2016	(England) Sammy Ameobi	Newcastle United	Bolton Wanderers	Loan
31 August 2016	(England) Keshi Anderson	Crystal Palace	Bolton Wanderers	Loan
31 August 2016	(England) Tom Anderson	Burnley	Chesterfield	Loan
31 August 2016	(France) Tony Andreu	Norwich City	(Scotland) Dundee United	Loan
31 August 2016	(Scotland) Ikechi Anya	Watford	Derby County	Undisclosed
31 August 2016	(Spain) Álvaro Arbeloa	(Spain) Real Madrid	West Ham United	Free
31 August 2016	(Ghana) Christian Atsu	Chelsea	Newcastle United	Loan
31 August 2016	(Italy) Mario Balotelli	Liverpool	(France) Nice	Free
31 August 2016	(England) Alex Baptiste	Middlesbrough	Preston North End	Loan
31 August 2016	(England) Nathan Baxter	Chelsea	Metropolitan Police	Loan
31 August 2016	(England) Hiram Boateng	Crystal Palace	Bristol Rovers	Loan
31 August 2016	(Ivory Coast) Wilfried Bony	Manchester City	Stoke City	Loan
31 August 2016	(Denmark) Nicolai Brock-Madsen	Birmingham City	(Netherlands) PEC Zwolle	Loan
31 August 2016	(England) Kean Bryan	Manchester City	Bury	Loan
31 August 2016	(England) Nathan Byrne	Wolverhampton Wanderers	Wigan Athletic	Undisclosed
31 August 2016	(Scotland) Kyle Cameron	Newcastle United	(Wales) Newport County	Loan
31 August 2016	(The Gambia) Mustapha Carayol	Middlesbrough	Nottingham Forest	Free
31 August 2016	(England) Baily Cargill	AFC Bournemouth	Gillingham	Loan
31 August 2016	(Portugal) Ivan Cavaleiro	(France) Monaco	Wolverhampton Wanderers	Undisclosed
31 August 2016	(Wales) Jake Charles	Huddersfield Town	Barnsley	Undisclosed
31 August 2016	(England) Jake Clarke-Salter	Chelsea	Bristol Rovers	Loan
31 August 2016	(England) Ryan Colclough	Wigan Athletic	Milton Keynes Dons	Loan
31 August 2016	(England) Larnell Cole	Fulham	(Scotland) Inverness Caledonian Thistle	Loan
31 August 2016	(England) Charlie Colkett	Chelsea	Bristol Rovers	Loan
31 August 2016	(Wales) Aaron Collins	Wolverhampton Wanderers	Notts County	Loan
31 August 2016	(Montserrat) Brandon Comley	Queens Park Rangers	Grimsby Town	Loan
31 August 2016	(England) Dion Conroy	Chelsea	Aldershot Town	Loan
31 August 2016	(England) Luke Croll	Crystal Palace	Exeter City	Loan
31 August 2016	(Colombia) Juan Cuadrado	Chelsea	(Italy) Juventus	Loan
31 August 2016	(Chile) Cristián Cuevas	Chelsea	(Belgium) Sint-Truiden	Loan
31 August 2016	(Belgium) Jason Denayer	Manchester City	Sunderland	Loan
31 August 2016	(Italy) Nicolao Dumitru	(Italy) Napoli	Nottingham Forest	Loan
31 August 2016	(Northern Ireland) Cameron Dummigan	Burnley	Oldham Athletic	Undisclosed
31 August 2016	(England) Ethan Ebanks-Landell	Wolverhampton Wanderers	Sheffield United	Loan
31 August 2016	(Netherlands) Marvin Emnes	(Wales) Swansea City	Blackburn Rovers	Loan
31 August 2016	(Sweden) Gustav Engvall	(Sweden) Göteborg	Bristol City	Undisclosed
31 August 2016	(Bulgaria) Dimitar Evtimov	Nottingham Forest	(Portugal) Olhanense	Loan
31 August 2016	(England) Shay Facey	Manchester City	(Netherlands) Heerenveen	Loan
31 August 2016	(Scotland) Islam Feruz	Chelsea	(Belgium) Royal Excel Mouscron	Loan
31 August 2016	(England) Tariqe Fosu	Reading	Colchester United	Loan
31 August 2016	(England) Dael Fry	Middlesbrough	Rotherham United	Loan
31 August 2016	(England) Dominic Gape	Southampton	Wycombe Wanderers	Loan
31 August 2016	(Cameroon) Paul Garita	Bristol City	Plymouth Argyle	Loan
31 August 2016	(England) Alex Gilliead	Newcastle United	Luton Town	Loan
31 August 2016	(Germany) Serge Gnabry	Arsenal	(Germany) Werder Bremen	Undisclosed
31 August 2016	(England) Lee Grant	Derby County	Stoke City	Loan
31 August 2016	(Republic of Ireland) Reece Grego-Cox	Queens Park Rangers	(Wales) Newport County	Loan
31 August 2016	(Scotland) Jack Grimmer	Fulham	Shrewsbury Town	Loan
31 August 2016	(England) Joe Hart	Manchester City	(Italy) Torino	Loan
31 August 2016	(England) Rhys Healy	(Wales) Cardiff City	(Wales) Newport County	Loan
31 August 2016	(England) Dean Henderson	Manchester United	Grimsby Town	Loan
31 August 2016	(Republic of Ireland) Jeff Hendrick	Derby County	Burnley	£10.5m
31 August 2016	(Norway) Markus Henriksen	(Netherlands) AZ	Hull City	Loan
31 August 2016	(England) Jack Hendry	Wigan Athletic	Milton Keynes Dons	Loan
31 August 2016	(England) James Henry	Wolverhampton Wanderers	Bolton Wanderers	Loan
31 August 2016	(England) Rico Henry	Walsall	Brentford	£1.5m
31 August 2016	(Scotland) Dominic Hyam	Reading	Portsmouth	Loan
31 August 2016	(Scotland) Alex Iacovitti	Nottingham Forest	Mansfield Town	Loan
31 August 2016	(Switzerland) Gökhan Inler	Leicester City	(Turkey) Beşiktaş	Free
31 August 2016	(England) Ryan Inniss	Crystal Palace	Southend United	Loan
31 August 2016	(Scotland) Alex Jakubiak	Watford	Fleetwood Town	Loan
31 August 2016	(Switzerland) Saidy Janko	(Scotland) Celtic	Barnsley	Loan
31 August 2016	(Spain) Joselu	Stoke City	(Spain) Deportivo La Coruña	Loan
31 August 2016	(England) Lukas Jutkiewicz	Burnley	Birmingham City	Loan
31 August 2016	(England) Sullay Kaikai	Crystal Palace	Brentford	Loan
31 August 2016	(Finland) Glen Kamara	Arsenal	Colchester United	Loan
31 August 2016	(England) Cole Kpekawa	Queens Park Rangers	Barnsley	Undisclosed
31 August 2016	(Northern Ireland) Daniel Lafferty	Burnley	Sheffield United	Loan
31 August 2016	(England) Rickie Lambert	West Bromwich Albion	(Wales) Cardiff City	Undisclosed
31 August 2016	(England) Adam Le Fondre	(Wales) Cardiff City	Wigan Athletic	Loan
31 August 2016	(Portugal) Licá	(Portugal) Porto	Nottingham Forest	Undisclosed
31 August 2016	(Spain) Pau López	(Spain) Espanyol	Tottenham Hotspur	Loan
31 August 2016	(Brazil) David Luiz	(France) Paris Saint-Germain	Chelsea	£34m
31 August 2016	(England) James Maddison	Norwich City	(Scotland) Aberdeen	Loan
31 August 2016	(France) Eliaquim Mangala	Manchester City	(Spain) Valencia	Loan
31 August 2016	(Serbia) Lazar Marković	Liverpool	(Portugal) Sporting CP	Loan
31 August 2016	(Scotland) Chris Martin	Derby County	Fulham	Loan
31 August 2016	(Netherlands) Bruno Martins Indi	(Portugal) Porto	Stoke City	Loan
31 August 2016	(England) Ntumba Massanka	Burnley	Morecambe	Loan
31 August 2016	(Democratic Republic of the Congo) Dieumerci Mbokani	(Ukraine) Dynamo Kyiv	Hull City	Loan
31 August 2016	(Republic of Ireland) Aiden McGeady	Everton	Preston North End	Loan
31 August 2016	(England) Luke McGee	Tottenham Hotspur	Peterborough United	Loan
31 August 2016	(England) Cameron McJannett	Luton Town	Stoke City	Undisclosed
31 August 2016	(England) Harry McKirdy	Aston Villa	Peterborough United	Loan
31 August 2016	(Scotland) Marc McNulty	Sheffield United	Bradford City	Loan
31 August 2016	(United States) Matt Miazga	Chelsea	(Netherlands) Vitesse	Loan
31 August 2016^{[e]}	(Portugal) Mika	(Portugal) Boavista	Sunderland	Undisclosed
31 August 2016	(England) George Moncur	Barnsley	Peterborough United	Loan
31 August 2016	(Egypt) Sam Morsy	Wigan Athletic	Barnsley	Loan
31 August 2016	(Scotland) Charlie Mulgrew	(Scotland) Celtic	Blackburn Rovers	Free
31 August 2016	(France) Samir Nasri	Manchester City	(Spain) Sevilla	Loan
31 August 2016	(Gabon) Didier N'Dong	(France) Lorient	Sunderland	£13.6m
31 August 2016	(Cameroon) Clinton N'Jie	Tottenham Hotspur	(France) Marseille	Loan
31 August 2016	(France) Georges-Kévin Nkoudou	(France) Marseille	Tottenham Hotspur	£9m
31 August 2016	(Cameroon) Allan Nyom	Watford	West Bromwich Albion	Undisclosed
31 August 2016	(Nigeria) Nathan Oduwa	Tottenham Hotspur	Peterborough United	Loan
31 August 2016	(Northern Ireland) Eunan O'Kane	AFC Bournemouth	Leeds United	Undisclosed
31 August 2016	(Nigeria) Kenneth Omeruo	Chelsea	(Turkey) Alanyaspor	Loan
31 August 2016	(Portugal) Joel Castro Pereira	Manchester United	(Portugal) Belenenses	Loan
31 August 2016	(Brazil) Lucas Piazon	Chelsea	Fulham	Loan
31 August 2016	(England) Adam Reach	Middlesbrough	Sheffield Wednesday	Undisclosed
31 August 2016	(France) Emmanuel Rivière	Newcastle United	(Spain) Osasuna	Loan
31 August 2016	(Wales) Hal Robson-Kanu	Unattached	West Bromwich Albion	Free
31 August 2016	(England) Jack Senior	Huddersfield Town	Luton Town	Undisclosed
31 August 2016	(France) Moussa Sissoko	Newcastle United	Tottenham Hotspur	£30m
31 August 2016	(Algeria) Islam Slimani	(Portugal) Sporting CP	Leicester City	£29m
31 August 2016	(England) Richard Smallwood	Rotherham United	Scunthorpe United	Loan
31 August 2016	(Austria) Renny Smith	Burnley	(Italy) Vicenza	Undisclosed
31 August 2016	(England) Jack Stacey	Reading	Exeter City	Loan
31 August 2016	(England) Richard Stearman	Fulham	Wolverhampton Wanderers	Loan
31 August 2016	(England) Jamie Sterry	Newcastle United	Coventry City	Loan
31 August 2016	(France) Franck Tabanou	(Wales) Swansea City	(Spain) Granada	Loan
31 August 2016	(Switzerland) Shani Tarashaj	Everton	(Germany) Eintracht Frankfurt	Loan
31 August 2016	(England) Tom Thorpe	Rotherham United	Bolton Wanderers	Loan
31 August 2016	(England) Harry Toffolo	Norwich City	Scunthorpe United	Loan
31 August 2016	(Spain) Adama Traoré	Aston Villa	Middlesbrough	Undisclosed
31 August 2016	(England) Shaun Tuton	Barnsley	Grimsby Town	Loan
31 August 2016	(Norway) Fredrik Ulvestad	Burnley	Charlton Athletic	Loan
31 August 2016	(Ecuador) Enner Valencia	West Ham United	Everton	Loan
31 August 2016	(Netherlands) Lars Veldwijk	Nottingham Forest	(Belgium) Kortrijk	Undisclosed
31 August 2016	(Belgium) Marnick Vermijl	Sheffield Wednesday	Preston North End	Undisclosed
31 August 2016	(Slovenia) Haris Vučkić	Newcastle United	Bradford City	Loan
31 August 2016	(England) Zak Vyner	Bristol City	Accrington Stanley	Loan
31 August 2016	(England) Tom Walker	Bolton Wanderers	Bury	Loan
31 August 2016	(England) Tyler Walker	Nottingham Forest	Stevenage	Loan
31 August 2016	(Northern Ireland) Jamie Ward	Nottingham Forest	Burton Albion	Loan
31 August 2016	(England) Chris Weale	Unattached	Derby County	Free
31 August 2016	(England) James Weir	Manchester United	Hull City	Undisclosed
31 August 2016	(Wales) Rhoys Wiggins	AFC Bournemouth	Birmingham City	Loan
31 August 2016	(Republic of Ireland) Conor Wilkinson	Bolton Wanderers	Chesterfield	Loan
31 August 2016	(Wales) Jonny Williams	Crystal Palace	Ipswich Town	Loan
31 August 2016	(England) Jack Wilshere	Arsenal	AFC Bournemouth	Loan
31 August 2016	(England) Andre Wisdom	Liverpool	(Austria) Red Bull Salzburg	Loan
31 August 2016	(Germany) Philipp Wollscheid	Stoke City	(Germany) VfL Wolfsburg	Loan
31 August 2016	(England) Kaiyne Woolery	Bolton Wanderers	Wigan Athletic	Undisclosed
31 August 2016	(Poland) Paweł Wszołek	(Italy) Verona	Queens Park Rangers	Loan
1 September 2016	(Republic of Ireland) Dylan Watts	(Republic of Ireland) UCD	Leicester City	Undisclosed

^{a} The deal was completed in May 2016.
^{b} Player officially joined his club on 1 July 2016.
^{c} Player officially joined his club on 4 July 2016.
^{d} Part of a combined deal worth £5.5m.
