= 2016–17 Wolverhampton Wanderers F.C. season =

English football club season

Wolverhampton Wanderers
2016–17 season
- Head coach: Kenny Jackett (to 29 July); Walter Zenga (30 July – 25 October); Rob Edwards (interim) (25 October – 5 November); Paul Lambert (5 November – 30 May); Nuno Espírito Santo (31 May)
- Stadium: Molineux
- Championship: 15th
- FA Cup: Fifth round
- League Cup: Third round
- Top goalscorer: League: Hélder Costa & David Edwards (10); All: Hélder Costa (12)
- Highest home attendance: 30,193 (vs Chelsea, 18 February 2017)
- Lowest home attendance: 8,252 (vs Crawley, 9 August 2016)
- Average home league attendance: 21,570
Home colours	Away colours

The 2016–17 season was the 139th year in the history of English football club Wolverhampton Wanderers. The club competed in the second tier of the English football system, the Football League Championship for a third consecutive year.

This was the first season for the club under the ownership of the Chinese investment group Fosun which acquired the club on 21 July 2016 for a reported £45 million. Although head coach Kenny Jackett's position was initially confirmed by the new owners, he was replaced by Walter Zenga before the season proper began. However, Zenga lasted just 14 league games before being dismissed with the team in 18th place.

Paul Lambert was appointed on 5 November, but despite leading the team to two victories away at Premier League opposition in the FA Cup, the club's league form showed only a marginal improvement in the form of a 15th-place finish, one place lower than the previous campaign (although with an identical points tally of 58).

Following an internal review of the season, it was announced on 30 May that the club had decided to relieve Lambert of his position.

== Results ==
=== Pre-season ===
15 July 2016 Friendly	Crewe Alexandra	0–2	Wolverhampton Wanderers	Crewe
15:00 BST		Report	Iorfa 14'; Mason 89'	Stadium: Gresty Road; Attendance: 1,880; Referee: Darren Handley

18 July 2016 Friendly	Cork City	1–2	Wolverhampton Wanderers	Cork, Ireland
15:00 BST	Coleman 82'	Report	Ennis 4'; Enobakhare 62'	Stadium: Turners Cross; Attendance: 642; Referee: Anthony Buttimer

23 July 2016 Friendly	Port Vale	0–0	Wolverhampton Wanderers	Burslem
15:00 BST		Report		Stadium: Vale Park; Attendance: 1,981 (824 away); Referee: Steve Rushton

26 July 2016 Friendly	Northampton Town	2–1	Wolverhampton Wanderers	Northampton
15:00 BST	Beautyman 37'; Richards 78' (pen.)	Report	Ennis 17'	Stadium: Sixfields Stadium; Attendance: 1,829 (688 away); Referee: Dean Whitehouse

30 July 2016 Friendly	Wolverhampton Wanderers	0–4	Swansea City	Wolverhampton
15:00 BST		Report	Routledge 12', 62'; Naughton 59'; McBurnie 84'	Stadium: Molineux; Attendance: 7,968 (175 away); Referee: Oliver Langford

=== Football League Championship ===
A total of 24 teams competed in the Football League Championship in the 2016–17 season. Each team played every other team twice, once at their stadium, and once at the opposition's. Three points were awarded to teams for each win, one point per draw, and none for defeats.

The provisional fixture list was released on 22 June 2016, but was subject to change in the event of matches being selected for television coverage or police concerns.

6 August 2016 1	Rotherham United	2–2	Wolverhampton Wanderers	Rotherham
15:00 BST	Ward 9'; Vaulks 20'	Report	Saville 39'; Böðvarsson 65'	Stadium: AESSEAL New York Stadium; Attendance: 11,291 (2,567 away fans); Referee: Scott Duncan

13 August 2016 2	Wolverhampton Wanderers	2–0	Reading	Wolverhampton
15:00 BST	Doherty 42'; Mason 47'	Report		Stadium: Molineux; Attendance: 20,425 (637 away fans); Referee: Darren Bond

16 August 2016 3	Wolverhampton Wanderers	0–0	Ipswich Town	Wolverhampton
19:45 BST	Böðvarsson (penalty missed) 24'	Report		Stadium: Molineux; Attendance: 19,991 (500 away fans); Referee: Peter Bankes

20 August 2016 4	Birmingham City	1–3	Wolverhampton Wanderers	Birmingham
15:00 BST	Adams 24'	Report	Mason 47'; Batth 61'; Böðvarsson 89'	Stadium: St Andrew's; Attendance: 18,569 (2,761 away fans); Referee: Keith Stroud

27 August 2016 5	Huddersfield Town	1–0	Wolverhampton Wanderers	Huddersfield
15:00 BST	van La Parra 6'	Report		Stadium: John Smith's Stadium; Attendance: 19,972 (1,951 away fans); Referee: Steve Martin

10 September 2016 6	Wolverhampton Wanderers	1–1	Burton Albion	Wolverhampton
15:00 BST	Oniangue 77'	Report	Akins (penalty missed) 21'; Miller 90+4'	Stadium: Molineux; Attendance: 22,049 (1,036 away fans); Referee: James Adcock

13 September 2016 7	Wolverhampton Wanderers	0–4	Barnsley	Wolverhampton
19:45 BST		Report	Hourihane 73'; Hammill 83'; Janko 85'; Bradshaw 90+2'	Stadium: Molineux; Attendance: 18,668 (701 away fans); Referee: Andrew Madley

17 September 2016 8	Newcastle United	0–2	Wolverhampton Wanderers	Newcastle upon Tyne
15:00 BST		Report	Mbemba 29' (o.g.); Costa 62'	Stadium: St James' Park; Attendance: 52,117 (3,257 away fans); Referee: Tim Robinson

24 September 2016 9	Wolverhampton Wanderers	3–1	Brentford	Wolverhampton
15:00 BST	Teixeira 47', 57'; Cavaleiro 90+3'	Report	Kaikai 67'	Stadium: Molineux; Attendance: 20,637 (631 away fans); Referee: Andy Davies

27 September 2016 10	Wigan Athletic	2–1	Wolverhampton Wanderers	Wigan
19:45 BST	Le Fondre 5'; Grigg 88'	Report	Oniangue 34'	Stadium: DW Stadium; Attendance: 10,723 (1,250 away fans); Referee: Tony Harrington

1 October 2016 11	Wolverhampton Wanderers	1–2	Norwich City	Wolverhampton
17:30 BST	Edwards 80'	Report	Jerome 2'; Brady 73'	Stadium: Molineux; Attendance: 18,793 (1,103 away fans); Referee: Geoff Eltringham
Note: Live on Sky Sports

15 October 2016 12	Aston Villa	1–1	Wolverhampton Wanderers	Birmingham
17:30 BST	Kodjia 15' (pen.)	Report	Hélder Costa 34' (pen.)	Stadium: Villa Park; Attendance: 32,533 (2,800 away fans); Referee: David Coote
Note: Live on Sky Sports

18 October 2016 13	Brighton & Hove Albion	1–0	Wolverhampton Wanderers	Brighton
19:45 BST	Baldock 14'	Report		Stadium: AMEX Stadium; Attendance: 25,231 (839 away fans); Referee: Keith Stroud

22 October 2016 14	Wolverhampton Wanderers	0–1	Leeds United	Wolverhampton
15:00 BST		Report	Sílvio 70' (o.g.)	Stadium: Molineux; Attendance: 23,607 (2,354 away fans); Referee: Stuart Attwell

29 October 2016 15	Blackburn Rovers	1–1	Wolverhampton Wanderers	Blackburn
17:30 BST	Gallagher 13'	Report	Edwards 78'	Stadium: Ewood Park; Attendance: 10,652 (821 away fans); Referee: Geoff Eltringham
Note: Live on Sky Sports

5 November 2016 16	Wolverhampton Wanderers	2–3	Derby County	Wolverhampton
12:30 GMT	Hélder Costa 61'; Edwards 82'	Report	Ince 6', 77' (pen.); Bent 15'	Stadium: Molineux; Attendance: 19,858 (1,309 away fans); Referee: Paul Tierney
Note: Live on Sky Sports

19 November 2016 17	Preston North End	0–0	Wolverhampton Wanderers	Preston
15:00 GMT		Report		Stadium: Deepdale; Attendance: 12,683 (2,300 away fans); Referee: James Linington

26 November 2016 18	Wolverhampton Wanderers	0–2	Sheffield Wednesday	Wolverhampton
15:00 GMT		Report	Forestieri 15' (pen.); Lee 29'	Stadium: Molineux; Attendance: 27,293 (2,416 away fans); Referee: Jeremy Simpson

1 December 2016 19	Queens Park Rangers	1–2	Wolverhampton Wanderers	Shepherd's Bush, London
19:45 GMT	Lynch 90'	Report	Edwards 60'; Costa 67'	Stadium: Loftus Road; Attendance: 12,222 (804 away fans); Referee: Tim Robinson
Note: Live on Sky Sports

10 December 2016 20	Wolverhampton Wanderers	4–4	Fulham	Wolverhampton
15:00 GMT	Hause 22'; Doherty 65'; Cavaleiro 74'; Edwards 90'	Report	Johansen 32'; Ayité 39', 90+4'; Cairney 42'	Stadium: Molineux; Attendance: 19,020 (672 away fans); Referee: Darren Bond

13 December 2016 21	Cardiff City	2–1	Wolverhampton Wanderers	Cardiff
19:45 GMT	Connolly 68'; Pilkington 86'	Report	Doherty 2'	Stadium: Cardiff City Stadium; Attendance: 14,853 (676 away fans); Referee: Andrew Madley

17 December 2016 22	Nottingham Forest	0–2	Wolverhampton Wanderers	Nottingham
15:00 GMT		Report	Costa 40'; Cavaleiro 79'	Stadium: City Ground; Attendance: 19,037 (1,923 away fans); Referee: Graham Scott

26 December 2016 23	Wolverhampton Wanderers	3–2	Bristol City	Wolverhampton
15:00 GMT	Edwards 3'; Costa 57'; Cavaleiro 84' (pen.)	Report	Abraham 38'; Flint 44'	Stadium: Molineux; Attendance: 24,669 (1,483 away fans); Referee: James Adcock

31 December 2016 24	Wolverhampton Wanderers	1–2	Queens Park Rangers	Wolverhampton
15:00 GMT	Edwards 61'	Report	Sylla 53'; Wszołek 87'	Stadium: Molineux; Attendance: 21,132 (528 away fans); Referee: Lee Probert

2 January 2017 25	Sheffield Wednesday	0–0	Wolverhampton Wanderers	Sheffield
15:00 GMT		Report		Stadium: Hillsborough; Attendance: 30,549 (1,021 away fans); Referee: Simon Hooper

14 January 2017 26	Wolverhampton Wanderers	1–0	Aston Villa	Wolverhampton
17:30 GMT	Mason 15'	Report		Stadium: Molineux; Attendance: 27,255 (4,195 away fans); Referee: Tony Harrington
Note: Live on Sky Sports

21 January 2017 27	Norwich City	3–1	Wolverhampton Wanderers	Norwich
15:00 GMT	Naismith 13'; Brady 75' (pen.); Howson 90+1'	Report	Costa 57' (pen.)	Stadium: Carrow Road; Attendance: 26,303 (1,190 away fans); Referee: David Coote

31 January 2017 28	Barnsley	1–3	Wolverhampton Wanderers	Barnsley
19:45 GMT	Roberts 80'	Report	Hause 5'; Edwards 36', 77'	Stadium: Oakwell; Attendance: 11,808 (808 away fans); Referee: Chris Kavanagh

4 February 2017 29	Burton Albion	2–1	Wolverhampton Wanderers	Burton upon Trent
15:00 GMT	Kightly 60'; Woodrow 90+4'	Report	Hélder Costa 40' (pen.)	Stadium: Pirelli Stadium; Attendance: 5,608 (1,640 away fans); Referee: Keith Stroud

11 February 2017 30	Wolverhampton Wanderers	0–1	Newcastle United	Wolverhampton
17:30 GMT		Report	Mitrović 44'	Stadium: Molineux; Attendance: 24,876 (4,164 away fans); Referee: Craig Pawson
Note: Live on Sky Sports

14 February 2017 31	Wolverhampton Wanderers	0–1	Wigan Athletic	Wolverhampton
19:45 GMT		Report	Buxton 88'	Stadium: Molineux; Attendance: 17,156 (261 away fans); Referee: Simon Hooper

24 February 2017 32	Wolverhampton Wanderers	1–2	Birmingham City	Wolverhampton
19:45 GMT	Dicko 74'	Report	Kieftenbeld 27'; Davis 32'	Stadium: Molineux; Attendance: 27,541 (2,151 away fans); Referee: Stephen Martin
Note: Live on Sky Sports

4 March 2017 33	Reading	2–1	Wolverhampton Wanderers	Reading
15:00 GMT	Kermorgant 48'; McShane 78'	Report	Marshall 50'	Stadium: Madejski Stadium; Attendance: 18,629 (1,814 away fans); Referee: Andrew Madley

7 March 2017 34	Ipswich Town	0–0	Wolverhampton Wanderers	Ipswich
19:45 GMT		Report		Stadium: Portman Road; Attendance: 15,076 (443 away fans); Referee: Darren Deadman

11 March 2017 35	Wolverhampton Wanderers	1–0	Rotherham United	Wolverhampton
15:00 GMT	Costa (penalty missed) 35'; Weimann 45+1'	Report		Stadium: Molineux; Attendance: 20,077 (206 away fans); Referee: Jeremy Simpson

14 March 2017 36	Brentford	1–2	Wolverhampton Wanderers	London
19:45 GMT	Colin 31'	Report	Doherty 86'; Costa 89'	Stadium: Griffin Park; Attendance: 8,732 (1,030 away fans); Referee: Keith Stroud

18 March 2017 37	Fulham	1–3	Wolverhampton Wanderers	London
15:00 GMT	Odoi 54'	Report	Cavaleiro 34'; Weimann 47'; Edwards 72'	Stadium: Craven Cottage; Attendance: 20,668 (2,465 away fans); Referee: Chris Kavanagh

1 April 2017 38	Wolverhampton Wanderers	3–1	Cardiff City	Wolverhampton
15:00 BST	Batth 9', 41'; Costa 82'	Report	Zohore 12'	Stadium: Molineux; Attendance: 20,519 (1,395 away fans); Referee: Andy Davies

4 April 2017 39	Wolverhampton Wanderers	1–0	Nottingham Forest	Wolverhampton
19:45 BST	Dicko 62'	Report		Stadium: Molineux; Attendance: 21,408 (1,260 away fans); Referee: James Linington

8 April 2017 40	Bristol City	3–1	Wolverhampton Wanderers	Bristol
15:00 BST	Paterson 33'; Abraham 39' (pen.), 49'	Report	Böðvarsson 78'	Stadium: Ashton Gate; Attendance: 20,323 (2,560 away fans); Referee: James Adcock

14 April 2017 41	Wolverhampton Wanderers	0–2	Brighton & Hove Albion	Wolverhampton
17:00 BST		Report	Knockaert 45', 82'	Stadium: Molineux; Attendance: 23,221 (2,770 away fans); Referee: Geoff Eltringham
Note: Live on Sky Sports

17 April 2017 42	Leeds United	0–1	Wolverhampton Wanderers	Leeds
15:00 BST		Report	Dicko 38'	Stadium: Elland Road; Attendance: 32,351 (1,164 away fans); Referee: Jeremy Simpson

22 April 2017 43	Wolverhampton Wanderers	0–0	Blackburn Rovers	Wolverhampton
15:00 BST		Report		Stadium: Molineux; Attendance: 20,249 (1,258 away fans); Referee: David Coote

25 April 2017 44	Wolverhampton Wanderers	0–1	Huddersfield Town	Wolverhampton
19:45 BST		Report	Brown 31'	Stadium: Molineux; Attendance: 17,505 (682 away fans); Referee: Tim Robinson

29 April 2017 45	Derby County	3–1	Wolverhampton Wanderers	Derby
15:00 BST	Nugent 12'; Johnson 29'; Bryson 57'	Report	Marshall 45+1'	Stadium: iPro Stadium; Attendance: 31,051 (2,888 away fans); Referee: Chris Kavanagh

7 May 2017 46	Wolverhampton Wanderers	1–0	Preston North End	Wolverhampton
12:00 BST	Batth 1'	Report		Stadium: Molineux; Attendance: 20,163 (863 away fans); Referee: Darren England

==== Results summary ====
Overall								Home						Away					
Pld	W	D	L	GF	GA	GD	Pts	W	D	L	GF	GA	GD	W	D	L	GF	GA	GD
46	16	10	20	54	58	−4	58	8	4	11	25	30	−5	8	6	9	29	28	+1

Source: Statto.com

==== Results by round ====
Round	1	2	3	4	5	6	7	8	9	10	11	12	13	14	15	16	17	18	19	20	21	22	23	24	25	26	27	28	29	30	31	32	33	34	35	36	37	38	39	40	41	42	43	44	45	46
Ground	A	H	H	A	A	H	H	A	H	A	H	A	A	H	A	H	A	H	A	H	A	A	H	H	A	H	A	A	A	H	H	H	A	A	H	A	A	H	H	A	H	A	H	H	A	H
Result	D	W	D	W	L	D	L	W	W	L	L	D	L	L	D	L	D	L	W	D	L	W	W	L	D	W	L	W	L	L	L	L	L	D	W	W	W	W	W	L	L	W	D	L	L	W
Position	8	6	8	3	9	11	16	10	8	11	12	12	15	18	17	19	18	21	19	19	20	18	15	16	16	16	18	16	18	18	18	19	21	21	20	18	16	16	15	15	16	16	15	15	15	15

Source: Statto.com
A = Away; H = Home; W = Win; D = Draw; L = Loss

==== League table ====
Pos	Team	Pld	W	D	L	GF	GA	GD	Pts
13	Aston Villa	46	16	14	16	47	48	−1	62
14	Barnsley	46	15	13	18	64	67	−3	58
15	Wolverhampton Wanderers	46	16	10	20	54	58	−4	58
16	Ipswich Town	46	13	16	17	48	58	−10	55
17	Bristol City	46	15	9	22	60	66	−6	54

Source: English Football League, Soccerway
Rules for classification: 1) Points; 2) Goal difference; 3) Number of goals scored; 4) Points in head-to-head matches; 5) Goal difference in head-to-head matches; 6) Goals scored in head-to-head matches; 7) Play-off.

=== FA Cup ===
7 January 2017 R3	Stoke City	0–2	Wolverhampton Wanderers	Stoke-on-Trent
15:00 GMT		Report	Costa 29'; Doherty 80'	Stadium: Bet365 Stadium; Attendance: 21,479 (4,632 away fans); Referee: Mike Jones

28 January 2017 R4	Liverpool	1–2	Wolverhampton Wanderers	Liverpool
12:30 GMT	Origi 86'	Report	Stearman 1'; Weimann 41'	Stadium: Anfield; Attendance: 52,469 (8,300 away fans); Referee: Craig Pawson
Note: Live on BT Sport

18 February 2017 R5	Wolverhampton Wanderers	0–2	Chelsea	Wolverhampton
17:30 GMT		Report	Pedro 65'; Costa 89'	Stadium: Molineux; Attendance: 30,193 (4,612 away fans); Referee: Jon Moss
Note: Live on BT Sport

=== EFL Cup ===
9 August 2016 R1	Wolverhampton Wanderers	2–1	Crawley Town	Wolverhampton
19:45 BST	Mason 7'; Coady 76'	Report	Boldewijn 13'	Stadium: Molineux; Attendance: 8,252 (111 away fans); Referee: Ross Joyce

23 August 2016 R2	Wolverhampton Wanderers	2–1	Cambridge United	Wolverhampton
19:45 BST	Costa 6'; Wallace 13'; Henry (penalty missed) 57'	Report	Elito 14'	Stadium: Molineux; Attendance: 9,500 (392 away fans); Referee: Brendan Malone

20 September 2016 R3	Newcastle United	2–0	Wolverhampton Wanderers	Newcastle upon Tyne
19:45 BST	Ritchie 29'; Gouffran 31'	Report		Stadium: St James' Park; Attendance: 34,735 (564 away fans); Referee: Andy Woolmer

=== EFL Trophy ===
Wolves were one of the sixteen teams from outside the bottom two divisions of the Football League to be invited to field their academy team in the competition due to it holding Category 1 academy status. They were drawn in Group B in the Northern section.

30 August 2016 Grp. B (N)	Chesterfield	2–1	Wolverhampton Wanderers U23	Chesterfield
19:45 BST	Ebanks-Blake 24'; Dennis 76'		Herc 74'	Stadium: Proact Stadium; Attendance: 950; Referee: Seb Stockbridge

4 October 2016 Grp. B (N)	Crewe Alexandra	2–3	Wolverhampton Wanderers U23	Crewe
19:30 BST	Dagnall 69'; Lowe 82'		Dicko 7', 45'; Enobakhare 88'	Stadium: Gresty Road; Attendance: 963; Referee: David Webb

8 November 2016 Grp. B (N)	Wolverhampton Wanderers U23	4–0	Accrington Stanley	Wolverhampton
19:45 GMT	Herc 18'; Wilson 37'; Ronan 45+3' (pen.); Enobakhare 67'	Report		Stadium: Molineux; Attendance: 547; Referee: David Webb

5 December 2016 R2 (N)	Wolverhampton Wanderers U23	1–1 (4–3 p)	Sunderland U23	Wolverhampton
19:00 GMT	Enobakhare 13'	Report	Beadling 17'	Stadium: Molineux; Attendance: 1,118; Referee: Mark Heywood
	Penalties
	Ronan (penalty scored); Deslandes (penalty missed); Enobakhare (penalty scored); Gibbs-White (penalty scored); Carnat (penalty scored)		(penalty scored) Robson; (penalty scored) Lawson; (penalty scored) Maja; (penalty missed) Molyneux; (penalty missed) Honeyman

10 January 2017 R3	Swansea City U23	2–1	Wolverhampton Wanderers U23	Swansea
19:00 GMT	McBurnie 47', 86'	Report	Herc 13'	Stadium: Liberty Stadium; Attendance: 980; Referee: Tim Robinson

== Players ==
=== Statistics ===
Key:
‡ On loan from another club * First appearance(s) for the club

- # = Squad number
- Pos = Playing position
- P = Number of games played
- G = Number of goals scored
- GK = Goalkeeper
- DF = Defender
- MF = Midfielder
- FW = Forward
- = Yellow cards
- = Red cards
- † Permanent player left club during the season
- ¤ Loaned to another club for part or all of season

Correct as of end of season. Starting appearances are listed first, followed by substitute appearances in parentheses where applicable.

No.	Pos	Name	P	G	P	G	P	G	P	G	A yellow card	A red card	Notes
No.	Pos	Name	League		FA Cup		League Cup		Total		Discipline		Notes
1	GK	(Nigeria) Carl Ikeme	31	0	2	0	0	0	33	0	0	0	
2	DF	(Republic of Ireland) Matt Doherty	41(1)	4	3	1	1(1)	0	45(2)	5	4	0	
3	DF	(Portugal) Sílvio	4	0	0	0	1	0	5	0	2	0	
4	MF	(Wales) David Edwards	42(2)	10	2(1)	0	0(2)	0	44(5)	10	9	0	
5	DF	(England) Richard Stearman ‡	18	0	1	1	0	0	19	1	2	0	
6	DF	(England) Danny Batth (c)	39	4	0	0	2	0	41	4	11	0	
7	MF	(England) James Henry ¤	1(1)	0	0	0	2	0	3(1)	0	0	0	
8	MF	(England) George Saville	15(9)	1	3	0	2	0	20(9)	1	7	0	
9	FW	(Mali) Nouha Dicko	19(11)	3	1(1)	0	0	0	20(12)	3	2	0	
10	FW	(Republic of Ireland) Joe Mason	9(10)	3	1(1)	0	2	1	12(11)	4	0	0	
11	MF	(England) Jordan Graham	1(1)	0	0	0	0	0	1(1)	0	0	0	
12	MF	(England) Jed Wallace ¤	5(4)	0	0	0	3	1	8(4)	1	1	0	
13	GK	(England) Jonathan Flatt ¤	0	0	0	0	0	0	0	0	0	0	
14	MF	(Wales) Lee Evans	12(3)	0	2	0	1	0	15(3)	0	2	0	
15	MF	(Netherlands) Ola John ‡¤	0(2)	0	0	0	0(1)	0	0(3)	0	0	0	
16	MF	(England) Conor Coady	34(5)	0	2	0	3	1	39(5)	1	8	0	
17	MF	(Portugal) Hélder Costa ‡	30(5)	10	3	1	1(1)	1	34(6)	12	3	0	
18	DF	(England) Dominic Iorfa	21(1)	0	1	0	2	0	24(1)	0	4	1	
19	MF	(England) Jack Price	17(2)	0	1	0	2(1)	0	20(3)	0	7	0	
20	MF	(Republic of the Congo) Prince Oniangué ¤	8(2)	2	0	0	1	0	9(2)	2	0	0	
21	GK	(England) Andy Lonergan	9(2)	0	0	0	3	0	12(2)	0	0	0	
22	FW	(Iceland) Jón Daði Böðvarsson	22(20)	3	2(1)	0	0(3)	0	24(24)	3	3	0	
23	DF	(England) Ethan Ebanks-Landell ¤	0	0	0	0	0	0	0	0	0	0	
24	MF	(Portugal) João Teixeira ‡	9(8)	2	0	0	3	0	12(8)	2	3	0	
25	MF	(England) Nathan Byrne †	0	0	0	0	0	0	0	0	0	0	
25	FW	(Netherlands) Paul Gladon	1(1)	0	0	0	1	0	2(1)	0	0	0	
26	FW	(Nigeria) Bright Enobakhare	8(5)	0	1	0	0	0	9(5)	0	1	0	
27	MF	(Morocco) Romain Saïss	19(5)	0	0(1)	0	0	0	19(6)	0	8	0	
28	DF	(France) Sylvain Deslandes ¤	0	0	0	0	0	0	0	0	0	0	
29	DF	(England) Cameron Borthwick-Jackson ‡	6	0	0	0	1	0	7	0	2	0	
30	DF	(England) Kortney Hause	23(1)	2	3	0	3	0	29(1)	2	2	0	
31	GK	(England) Harry Burgoyne ¤	6	0	1	0	0	0	7	0	1	0	
34	FW	(England) Donovan Wilson	0(1)	0	0(1)	0	0	0	0(2)	0	0	0	
43	MF	(Republic of Ireland) Connor Ronan	3(1)	0	0(2)	0	0	0	3(3)	0	0	0	
48	DF	(England) Connor Johnson	0	0	0	0	0	0	0	0	0	0	
50	MF	(Portugal) Ivan Cavaleiro	17(14)	5	0	0	0	0	17(14)	5	4	1	
55	MF	(England) Morgan Gibbs-White	2(5)	0	0(1)	0	0	0	2(6)	0	0	0	
60	DF	(England) Mike Williamson	5	0	1	0	0	0	6	0	1	1	
63	MF	(Austria) Andreas Weimann ‡	15(4)	2	2	1	0	0	17(4)	3	4	0	
64	MF	(England) Ben Marshall	13(3)	2	0	0	0	0	13(3)	2	1	0	

=== Awards ===
Award	Winner
Fans' Player of the Season	Hélder Costa
Players' Player of the Season	Hélder Costa
Young Player of the Season	Connor Ronan
Academy Player of the Season	Morgan Gibbs-White
Goal of the Season	Hélder Costa (vs Cardiff, 1 April 2017)

== Transfers ==
=== In ===
Date	Player	From	Fee
1 July 2016	(Republic of Ireland) Rory Brown	(Northern Ireland) Crusaders	Free
1 July 2016	(England) Andy Lonergan	(England) Fulham	Free
1 July 2016	(Scotland) Elliott Watt	(England) Preston North End	Free
30 July 2016	(Portugal) Sílvio	(Spain) Atlético Madrid	Free
2 August 2016	(Iceland) Jón Daði Böðvarsson	(Germany) Kaiserslautern	£2,700,000
15 August 2016	(Republic of the Congo) Prince Oniangué	(France) Reims	£2,000,000
26 August 2016	(Netherlands) Paul Gladon	(Netherlands) Heracles Almelo	£1,000,000
29 August 2016	(Scotland) Jack Ruddy	(England) Bury	Undisclosed
30 August 2016	(Morocco) Romain Saïss	(France) Angers	£3,000,000
31 August 2016	(Portugal) Ivan Cavaleiro	Monaco	£7,000,000
13 January 2017	(Haiti) Duckens Nazon	(India) Kerala Blasters	Free
28 January 2017	(Hungary) Dániel Csóka	(Hungary) ZTE	£135,000
30 January 2017	(Portugal) Hélder Costa	(Portugal) Benfica	£13,000,000
31 January 2017	(England) Ben Marshall	(England) Blackburn Rovers	£1,500,000
31 January 2017	(Netherlands) Sherwin Seedorf	(England) Nike Academy	Free

=== Out ===
Date	Player	To	Fee
1 June 2016	(Netherlands) Rajiv van La Parra	(England) Huddersfield Town	£750,000
30 June 2016	(Togo) Razak Boukari	(France) Châteauroux (Note: Following Boukari's release, he signed for Châteauroux.)	Free
30 June 2016	(England) Zeli Ismail	(England) Bury (Note: Following Ismail's release, he signed for Bury.)	Free
30 June 2016	(Republic of Ireland) Liam McAlinden	(England) Exeter City (Note: Following McAlinden's release, he signed for Exeter City.)	Free
30 June 2016	(Republic of Ireland) Aaron McCarey	(Scotland) Ross County (Note: Following McCarey's release, he signed for Ross County.)	Free
30 June 2016	(England) Tommy Rowe	(England) Doncaster Rovers (Note: Following Rowe's release, he signed for Doncaster Rovers.)	Free
30 June 2016	(Iceland) Björn Bergmann Sigurðarson	(Norway) Molde (Note: Following Sigurðarson's release, he signed for Molde.)	Free
1 July 2016	(Guinea-Bissau) Eusébio Bancessi	(Poland) Pogoń Siedlce (Note: Following Bancessi's release, he signed for Pogoń Siedlce.)	Free
1 July 2016	(England) Rhys Bills	Released	Free
1 July 2016	(England) Jordan Clement	(England) Romulus (Note: Following Clement's release, he signed for Romulus.)	Free
1 July 2016	(England) Joe Delacoe	Released	Free
1 July 2016	(England) Owen Eggington	(England) Nuneaton Borough (Note: Following Eggington's release, he signed for Nuneaton Borough.)	Free
1 July 2016	(England) Callum Harris	(Belgium) Patro Eisden (Note: Following Harris' release, he signed for Patro Eisden.)	Free
1 July 2016	(England) Bradley Lindsey	(England) Boldmere St. Michaels (Note: Following Lindsey's release, he signed for Romulus.)	Free
1 July 2016	(Zimbabwe) Tendai Matinyadze	Released	Free
1 July 2016	(Wales) Declan Weeks	(England) Southport (Note: Following Weeks' release, he signed for Southport.)	Free
1 July 2016	(England) Ashley Carter	(England) Kidderminster Harriers	Free
5 July 2016	(England) James Kellermann	(England) Aldershot Town	Free
11 July 2016	(Romania) Răzvan Oaidă	(Italy) Brescia	Undisclosed
22 July 2016	(Scotland) Kevin McDonald	(England) Fulham	£1,250,000
31 August 2016	(England) Nathan Byrne	(England) Wigan Athletic	£500,000
13 January 2017	(England) Connor Hunte	(England) Greenwich Borough (Note: Following Hunte's release, he signed for Greenwich Borough.)	Free

=== Loans in ===
Date from	Player	From	Date until
29 July 2016	(Portugal) Hélder Costa	(Portugal) Benfica	30 January 2017 (Note: On 30 January 2017, Hélder Costa joined the club on a permanent basis.)
2 August 2016	(Portugal) João Teixeira	(Portugal) Benfica	End of season
22 August 2016	(England) Cameron Borthwick-Jackson	(England) Manchester United	End of season
22 August 2016	(Netherlands) Ola John	(Portugal) Benfica	End of season
31 August 2016	(England) Richard Stearman	(England) Fulham	End of season
19 January 2017	(Austria) Andreas Weimann	(England) Derby County	End of season

=== Loans out ===
Date from	Player	To	Date until
15 August 2016	(England) Connor Hunte	(England) Stevenage	7 January 2017
25 August 2016	(Wales) Bradley Reid	(Wales) Wrexham	September 2016
31 August 2016	(England) Ethan Ebanks-Landell	(England) Sheffield United	End of season
31 August 2016	(Wales) Aaron Collins	(England) Notts County	9 January 2017
31 August 2016	(England) James Henry	(England) Bolton Wanderers	End of season
2 September 2016	(England) Ben O'Hanlon	(England) Nuneaton Town	October 2016
13 January 2017	(Netherlands) Ola John	(Spain) Deportivo de La Coruña	End of season
16 January 2017	(Republic of the Congo) Prince Oniangué	(France) Bastia	End of season
19 January 2017	(England) Jed Wallace	(England) Millwall	End of season
31 January 2017	(France) Sylvain Deslandes	(England) Bury	End of season
31 January 2017	(England) Will Randall	(England) Walsall	End of season
31 January 2017	(England) Aaron Simpson	(England) Portsmouth	End of season
31 January 2017	(Portugal) João Teixeira	(England) Nottingham Forest	End of season
25 February 2017	(England) Harry Burgoyne	(England) Barnet	4 March 2017
23 March 2017	(Wales) Aaron Collins	(England) Tranmere Rovers	End of season
