= Sylvain Deslandes =

Footballer (born 1997)

Personal information
- Full name: Sylvain Boris Nabil Deslandes
- Date of birth: 25 April 1997 (age 29)
- Place of birth: Kouoptamo, Cameroon
- Height: 1.78 m (5 ft 10 in)
- Position: Left back

Youth career
- 2007–2008: AM. S. Soliers
- 2008–2010: USON Mondeville
- 2010–2015: Caen

Senior career*
Years	Team	Apps	(Gls)
2013–2015	Caen II	8	(1)
2015–2020	Wolverhampton Wanderers	4	(0)
2017	→ Bury (loan)	0	(0)
2018	→ Portsmouth (loan)	2	(0)
2018–2019	→ FC Jumilla (loan)	12	(0)
2020–2021	Argeș Pitești	26	(2)
2021–2023	Debrecen	43	(2)
2023–2024	Sabail	16	(0)
2024–2025	Omonia 29M	23	(1)

International career^{‡}
2013	France U16	1	(0)
2013–2014	France U17	7	(0)
2014	France U18	3	(0)
2016	France U19	3	(0)
2016	France U20	1	(0)
- * Club domestic league appearances and goals as of 14:28, 12 May 2025 (UTC) ‡ National team caps and goals as of 07:00, 31 July 2019 (UTC)

Sylvain Boris Nabil Deslandes (born 25 April 1997) is a professional footballer who plays as a defender. Born in Cameroon, he has represented France at under-16 through under-20 level.

== Career ==
Deslandes moved upon the expiry of his contract with French club Caen to join English side Wolverhampton Wanderers in July 2015, agreeing a two-year deal (with the option of a third year). He made his club debut on 25 August 2015 in a League Cup win over Barnet.

On 31 January 2017, he joined Bury on loan until the end of the season. He returned to Wolves at the end of the 2016–17 season having made no appearances for Bury.

He appeared regularly under Nuno Espírito Santo in pre-season before the 2017–18 campaign and played the full 90 minutes of a 2–0 EFL Cup win at Premier League side Southampton. He also came on as a substitute during Wolves' 2–1 Championship victory against Nottingham Forest in September 2017, en route to winning promotion as champions.

On 3 January 2018, he agreed to join Portsmouth on loan until the end of the season where he reunited with former Wolves manager Kenny Jackett. However, he returned to Wolves at the end of the season having made only two appearances there after Jackett had said that Deslandes' future was not at left-back but centre-back as he is a player with "power" and "athleticism".

Deslandes was supposedly loaned out again for the 2019–20 season to Bulgarian side Lokomotiv Plovdiv with fellow Wolves player Jordan Graham on a season-long loan. However, it was announced that both Deslandes' and Graham's loan spells had failed to receive the necessary FIFA clearance in due time.

On 31 January 2020, Deslandes left Wolves permanently to join Romanian club Argeș Pitești.

On 15 July 2021, Deslandes signed a two-year contract with Hungarian club Debreceni VSC containing a possible one-year extension.

On 28 September 2023, Azerbaijan Premier League club Sabail announced the signing of Deslandes.

== Career statistics ==
=== Club ===
As of match played 15 May 2022

Appearances and goals by club, season and competition
Club	Season	League			National cup		League cup		Other		Total	
Club	Season	Division	Apps	Goals	Apps	Goals	Apps	Goals	Apps	Goals	Apps	Goals
Caen II	2013–14	Championnat National 3	4	0	–		–		0	0	4	0
Caen II	2014–15	Championnat National 3	4	1	–		–		0	0	4	1
Caen II	Total		8	1	0	0	0	0	0	0	8	1
Wolverhampton Wanderers	2015–16	Championship	3	0	0	0	2	0	0	0	5	0
Wolverhampton Wanderers	2016–17	Championship	0	0	0	0	0	0	0	0	0	0
Wolverhampton Wanderers	2017–18	Championship	1	0	0	0	2	0	0	0	3	0
Wolverhampton Wanderers	Total		4	0	0	0	4	0	0	0	8	0
Bury (loan)	2016–17	League One	0	0	0	0	0	0	0	0	0	0
Portsmouth (loan)	2017–18	League One	2	0	0	0	0	0	0	0	2	0
FC Jumilla (loan)	2018–19	Segunda División B – Group 4	12	0	0	0	0	0	0	0	12	0
Argeș Pitești	2019–20	Liga II	6	0	0	0	0	0	0	0	6	0
Argeș Pitești	2020–21	Liga II	20	2	0	0	0	0	0	0	20	2
Argeș Pitești	Total		26	2	0	0	0	0	0	0	26	2
Debrecen	2020–21	Nemzeti Bajnokság I	31	1	2	0	0	0	0	0	33	1
Career total			73	4	2	0	4	0	0	0	89	4
