= Jesús Gámez =

Spanish footballer (born 1985)

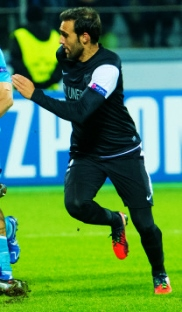
- Gámez with Málaga in 2012

Personal information
- Full name: Jesús Gámez Duarte
- Date of birth: 10 April 1985 (age 41)
- Place of birth: Fuengirola, Spain
- Height: 1.82 m (6 ft 0 in)
- Position: Right-back

Youth career
- 1997–2000: Fuengirola
- 2000–2004: Málaga

Senior career*
| Years | Team | Apps | (Gls) |
| 2004–2006 | Málaga B | 40 | (1) |
| 2005–2014 | Málaga | 266 | (1) |
| 2014–2016 | Atlético Madrid | 24 | (0) |
| 2016–2018 | Newcastle United | 7 | (0) |
| Total | | 337 | (2) |

International career
| 2005 | Spain U23 | 4 | (2) |
- * Club domestic league appearances and goals

Jesús Gámez Duarte (Spanish pronunciation: [xeˈsus ˈɣameθ ˈðwaɾte]; (Note: In isolation, Gámez and Duarte are pronounced [ˈɡameθ] and [ˈdwaɾte] respectively.) born 10 April 1985) is a Spanish former professional footballer who played mainly as a right-back.

He spent most of his career with Málaga, making his debut with the first team in 2005 and going on to make 293 official appearances. He also played two seasons in England with Newcastle United.

== Club career ==
=== Málaga ===
Born in Fuengirola, Málaga, Andalusia, Gámez first appeared professionally with Málaga CF's B side in 2003–04's Segunda División, and helped them to retain their status three seasons. However, midway through 2005–06, he was promoted to the first team, making his La Liga debut on 27 November 2005 (five minutes played in a 3–2 away loss to Getafe CF) as both the first and the second teams from the city eventually dropped down a level in June.

Gámez was an undisputed starter the next second-tier seasons, replacing Gerardo as and contributing 35 games in 2007–08 as the club returned to the top flight after a two-year absence. He continued to be first choice throughout the following campaign, appearing in roughly the same matches and minutes.

Gámez was made captain in summer 2011, after the retirement of veteran Francesc Arnau. He made his 200th league appearance on 29 January 2012, featuring one minute in a local derby against Sevilla FC (2–1 home win); that same season, he helped the Boquerones to their highest ever league finish, a fourth place with the subsequent spot in the playoff-round of the UEFA Champions League.

On 15 May 2012, Gámez extended his contract with Málaga until June 2016. On 21 October of the following year, he added one more year to his link.

=== Atlético Madrid ===
On 8 August 2014, Gámez signed a three-year deal with reigning champions Atlético Madrid. For most of his first season, he was used by manager Diego Simeone as a left-back.

=== Newcastle United ===
During the 2016 summer transfer window, the 31-year-old Gámez moved abroad for the first time in his career and joined Championship club Newcastle United on a two-year deal. He made his competitive debut on 23 August, starting in a 2–0 home win against Cheltenham Town in the EFL Cup. His maiden league appearance took place four days later, as he came on as a 72nd-minute substitute for Vurnon Anita against Brighton & Hove Albion, also a 2–0 home victory.

With the team back in the Premier League, Gámez made his debut in the competition on 10 September 2017 at the age of 32 years and 152 days, playing the entire 1–0 victory at Swansea City. He left St James' Park in June 2018, with only ten competitive appearances to his credit.

== Career statistics ==
| Club | Season | League | | | Cup | | League Cup | | Other | | Total | |
| Club | Season | Division | Apps | Goals | Apps | Goals | Apps | Goals | Apps | Goals | Apps | Goals |
|---|---|---|---|---|---|---|---|---|---|---|---|---|
| Málaga B | 2003–04 | Segunda División | 2 | 0 | — | | — | | — | | 2 | 0 |
| Málaga B | 2004–05 | Segunda División | 22 | 1 | — | | — | | — | | 22 | 1 |
| Málaga B | 2005–06 | Segunda División | 16 | 0 | — | | — | | — | | 16 | 0 |
| Málaga B | Total | | 40 | 1 | — | | — | | — | | 40 | 1 |
| Málaga | 2005–06 | La Liga | 15 | 0 | 0 | 0 | — | | — | | 15 | 0 |
| Málaga | 2006–07 | Segunda División | 38 | 1 | 0 | 0 | — | | — | | 38 | 1 |
| Málaga | 2007–08 | Segunda División | 35 | 0 | 0 | 0 | — | | — | | 35 | 0 |
| Málaga | 2008–09 | La Liga | 35 | 0 | 0 | 0 | — | | — | | 35 | 0 |
| Málaga | 2009–10 | La Liga | 32 | 0 | 4 | 0 | — | | — | | 36 | 0 |
| Málaga | 2010–11 | La Liga | 30 | 0 | 2 | 0 | — | | — | | 32 | 0 |
| Málaga | 2011–12 | La Liga | 25 | 0 | 1 | 0 | — | | — | | 26 | 0 |
| Málaga | 2012–13 | La Liga | 28 | 0 | 4 | 0 | — | | 10 (Note: Appearances in UEFA Champions League) | 0 | 42 | 0 |
| Málaga | 2013–14 | La Liga | 28 | 0 | 2 | 0 | — | | — | | 30 | 0 |
| Málaga | Total | | 266 | 1 | 13 | 0 | — | | 10 | 0 | 289 | 1 |
| Atlético Madrid | 2014–15 | La Liga | 14 | 0 | 4 | 0 | — | | 3 | 0 | 21 | 0 |
| Atlético Madrid | 2015–16 | La Liga | 10 | 0 | 5 | 0 | — | | 1 | 0 | 16 | 0 |
| Atlético Madrid | Total | | 24 | 0 | 9 | 0 | — | | 4 | 0 | 37 | 0 |
| Newcastle United | 2016–17 | Championship | 5 | 0 | 1 | 0 | 1 | 0 | — | | 7 | 0 |
| Newcastle United | 2017–18 | Premier League | 2 | 0 | 0 | 0 | 1 | 0 | 0 | 0 | 3 | 0 |
| Career total | | | 337 | 2 | 23 | 0 | 2 | 0 | 14 | 0 | 376 | 2 |

== Honours ==
Atlético Madrid

- UEFA Champions League runner-up: 2015–16

Newcastle United

- EFL Championship: 2016–17

Spain U23

- Mediterranean Games: 2005
