= Hélder Costa =

Angolan footballer (born 1994)

Personal information
- Full name: Hélder Wander Sousa de Azevedo Costa
- Date of birth: 12 January 1994 (age 32)
- Place of birth: Luanda, Angola
- Height: 1.78 m (5 ft 10 in)
- Positions: Attacking midfielder; right winger

Team information
- Current team: Petro de Luanda
- Number: 11

Youth career
- 2004–2012: Benfica

Senior career*
| Years | Team | Apps | (Gls) |
| 2012–2017 | Benfica B | 72 | (15) |
| 2014–2017 | Benfica | 0 | (0) |
| 2015 | → Deportivo La Coruña (loan) | 6 | (0) |
| 2015–2016 | → Monaco (loan) | 25 | (3) |
| 2016–2017 | → Wolverhampton Wanderers (loan) | 35 | (10) |
| 2017–2020 | Wolverhampton Wanderers | 62 | (6) |
| 2019–2020 | → Leeds United (loan) | 40 | (3) |
| 2020–2023 | Leeds United | 25 | (4) |
| 2021–2022 | → Valencia (loan) | 22 | (0) |
| 2022–2023 | → Al Ittihad (loan) | 18 | (3) |
| 2024–2025 | Estoril Praia | 13 | (1) |
| 2025 | Yunnan Yukun | 0 | (0) |
| 2026– | Petro de Luanda | 0 | (0) |

International career
| 2009 | Portugal U16 | 11 | (0) |
| 2010 | Portugal U17 | 18 | (4) |
| 2011 | Portugal U18 | 14 | (1) |
| 2012–2013 | Portugal U19 | 11 | (4) |
| 2014 | Portugal U20 | 5 | (3) |
| 2014–2017 | Portugal U21 | 1 | (0) |
| 2016 | Portugal U23 | 1 | (0) |
| 2018 | Portugal | 1 | (1) |
| 2021–2023 | Angola | 11 | (1) |
- * Club domestic league appearances and goals as of 12:23, 19 June 2026 (UTC)

Hélder Wander Sousa de Azevedo Costa (born 12 January 1994) is an Angolan professional footballer who plays as an attacking midfielder or right winger for Girabola club Petro de Luanda.

Starting his playing career at Benfica, with which he made a single Taça da Liga appearance, Costa spent most of his career abroad, including at Deportivo de La Coruña in La Liga and Monaco in Ligue 1. He also spent several years in England with Wolverhampton Wanderers and Leeds United, winning the EFL Championship with both. He departed Leeds in October 2023, and became a free agent. He would later move abroad and return to Portugal, signing for Estoril Praia in August 2024.

Born in Angola, Costa represented Portugal from under-16 all the way through to the senior side, for whom he scored on his only appearance in 2018. He scored his first goal on his debut for Angola in November 2021.

== Club career ==
=== Benfica ===
On 11 August 2012, Costa made his professional debut with Benfica B in a 2012–13 Segunda Liga match against Braga B where he played 72 minutes as a winger.

His first professional goal came on 23 August 2013, in a 3–0 home win over Portimonense, one of eight that season including on 23 November in a 4–3 triumph against Oliveirense in which he was also sent off.

On 25 January 2014, Costa debuted with Benfica in a 2013–14 Taça da Liga third round match against Gil Vicente, playing the final 13 minutes of the 1–0 win at the Estádio da Luz as a substitute for Miralem Sulejmani. He played no further part in the tournament, which Benfica went on to win. On 5 November 2014, he scored a hat-trick in the Segunda Liga with Benfica B against Olhanense in a 5–1 home win.

Costa came through the Benfica academy in the same age group as fellow future Portugal internationals Ivan Cavaleiro and Bernardo Silva.

==== Deportivo (loan) ====
On 19 January 2015, Costa was loaned to La Liga's Deportivo de La Coruña until the end of the season. He made six appearances for the Galicians, all from the substitutes' bench.

==== Monaco (loan) ====
On 10 July 2015, Costa joined Ligue 1 club Monaco on a one-year loan. He was signed alongside Benfica teammates Cavaleiro and Silva. He scored his first goal in a Ligue 1 match on 8 November, opening a 3–1 loss away to Bordeaux. He also provided the assist for Kylian Mbappé's first-ever league goal for Monaco in a 3–1 victory against Troyes on 26 February 2016.

Costa played 28 times and scored 5 goals in all competitions for Monaco during the 2015–16 season, facing competition out wide from the likes of Silva, Thomas Lemar and Mbappé.

=== Wolverhampton Wanderers ===
On 29 July 2016, Costa moved on a season-long loan to EFL Championship club Wolverhampton Wanderers, for whom he made his debut on 6 August as a substitute in a 2–2 draw at Rotherham United. He scored his first goal for the club in a 2–1 EFL Cup win against Cambridge United on 23 August, and his first league goal on 17 September in a 2–0 win against Newcastle United at St James' Park. Costa was also praised for his performance against Premier League side Liverpool in the FA Cup, with Wolves causing a shock 2–1 win at Anfield; Costa assisted on both Wolves goals.

On 30 January 2017, Wolves purchased Costa outright for a £13 million transfer fee, at the time the highest-ever transfer fee paid by the club. Following payment, he signed a four-and-a-half-year contract with the club. After scoring 12 goals and eight assists in all competitions in his first season, at the annual end of season awards, he won the 2016–17 Wolves Player of the Season Award, also receiving the Players' Player of the Year Award and winning Goal of the Season for a goal he scored against Cardiff City.

On 22 November 2017, Costa scored his first goal of the 2017–18 season in a 4–1 win against Leeds United. He received a winner's medal during the 2017–18 EFL Championship, contributing five goals and six assists in the league over the course of the season.

Costa made his first Premier League appearance on 11 August 2018 in Wolves' opening match of the league season in a 2–2 draw against Everton. On 29 December, in a 3–1 win against Tottenham Hotspur at Wembley Stadium, he scored his first Premier League goal. In total during the 2018–19 season, Costa made 30 appearances for Wolves in all competitions as he helped the side to a seventh-place finish, sufficient for qualification to the 2019–20 UEFA Europa League.

=== Leeds United ===
On 3 July 2019, Costa joined EFL Championship club Leeds United on loan for the 2019–20 season. As part of the deal, Costa was to effectively join Leeds outright in July 2020 on a four-year contract for an approximate £15 million transfer fee. He was given the number 17 shirt, making him the first player since 2014 to wear it, after the shirt was brought out of retirement. He made his debut on 4 August in Leeds' Championship opening day 3–1 victory against Bristol City, and his first start nine days later in the EFL Cup against Salford City, contributing two assists.

Costa scored his first goal for the club on 27 August in an EFL Cup match against Stoke City, the equaliser that sent the tie to a penalty shootout after a 2–2 draw in normal time, with him also scoring his penalty in the 4–5 defeat. On 30 November, in a 4–0 victory against Middlesbrough, he scored his first league goal.

On 7 July 2020, Costa joined Leeds permanently on a four-year contract. Days later, Leeds earned promotion to the Premier League as EFL champions. Costa made his Premier League debut for Leeds in the first match of the season against reigning champions Liverpool on 12 September, assisting Mateusz Klich's goal in a 4–3 defeat away from home and scored a brace a week later on 19 September in Leeds's first home league win of the season, a 4–3 victory over Fulham.

On 6 October 2023, Leeds announced that Costa had departed the club by mutual consent.

==== Valencia (loan) ====
On 31 August 2021, Costa joined La Liga side Valencia on loan for the 2021–22 season.

==== Al-Ittihad (loan) ====
In August 2022, Costa joined Saudi Pro League club Al-Ittihad on loan for the duration of the 2022–23 season, and subsequently, Costa reunited with former Wolves manager Nuno Espírito Santo. He scored his first goal for the club against Al Taawoun on 26 December 2022.

=== Estoril ===
On 30 July 2024, Costa returned to Portugal for the first time in seven years, successfully completing his medical at fellow Liga Portugal club Estoril Praia. On 1 August, the deal was made official, with Costa signing on a one-year contract.

=== Yunnan Yukun ===
On 23 January 2025, Costa joined Chinese Super League side Yunnan Yukun.

== International career ==
=== Portugal ===
Born in Angola, Costa started his international career in representing Portugal. He played for Portugal at the 2013 UEFA European Under-19 Football Championship, and although he did not score in the team's run to the semi-finals, he was named in the Team of the Tournament.

Costa also represented Portugal at the 2014 Toulon Tournament.

Costa received his first call-up to the senior Portugal squad ahead of the UEFA Nations League fixtures in October 2018. He made his senior international debut in a friendly against Scotland at Hampden Park on 14 October, in a 3–1 win in which he scored the opening goal. Portugal won the 2018–19 UEFA Nations League, but Costa was not called up for the final four tournament.

=== Angola ===
On 16 March 2021, Costa was called up to the Angola squad for matches in 2021 Africa Cup of Nations qualification against the Gambia and Gabon. He was eligible as he had only played a friendly for Portugal. He made his debut in a 2022 FIFA World Cup qualifier at home to Egypt on 12 November that year, scoring the opening goal of a 2–2 home draw. By doing so, he became the third footballer in history (behind Alfredo Di Stéfano and José Altafini) to score a goal on his debut for two different nations.

== Style of play ==
Costa has been deployed predominantly as a winger on either side of the pitch. A versatile player, he can also play as a forward, or even as an attacking midfielder. He usually utilizes his speed and technical ability for getting past opponents in one-on-one situations. He is also known for his skill, pace, trickery, flair, and creativity.

== Career statistics ==
=== Club ===
As of match played 18 August 2024

Appearances and goals by club, season and competition
| Club | Season | League | | | National cup (Note: Includes Taça de Portugal, Coupe de France, FA Cup, Copa del Rey, King Cup) | | League cup (Note: Includes Taça da Liga, EFL Cup) | | Continental | | Total | |
| Club | Season | Division | Apps | Goals | Apps | Goals | Apps | Goals | Apps | Goals | Apps | Goals |
|---|---|---|---|---|---|---|---|---|---|---|---|---|
| Benfica B | 2012–13 | Segunda Liga | 12 | 0 | — | | — | | — | | 12 | 0 |
| Benfica B | 2013–14 | Segunda Liga | 37 | 8 | — | | — | | — | | 37 | 8 |
| Benfica B | 2014–15 | Segunda Liga | 23 | 7 | — | | — | | — | | 23 | 7 |
| Benfica B | Total | | 72 | 15 | — | | — | | — | | 72 | 15 |
| Benfica | 2013–14 | Primeira Liga | 0 | 0 | 0 | 0 | 1 | 0 | 0 | 0 | 1 | 0 |
| Deportivo (loan) | 2014–15 | La Liga | 6 | 0 | — | | — | | — | | 6 | 0 |
| Monaco (loan) | 2015–16 | Ligue 1 | 25 | 3 | 3 | 2 | 0 | 0 | 0 | 0 | 28 | 5 |
| Wolverhampton Wanderers (loan) | 2016–17 | Championship | 35 | 10 | 3 | 1 | 2 | 1 | — | | 40 | 12 |
| Wolverhampton Wanderers | 2017–18 | Championship | 36 | 5 | 2 | 0 | 1 | 0 | — | | 39 | 5 |
| Wolverhampton Wanderers | 2018–19 | Premier League | 25 | 1 | 4 | 0 | 1 | 1 | — | | 30 | 2 |
| Wolverhampton Wanderers | Total | | 96 | 16 | 9 | 1 | 4 | 2 | — | | 109 | 19 |
| Leeds United (loan) | 2019–20 | Championship | 40 | 3 | 1 | 0 | 2 | 1 | – | | 43 | 4 |
| Leeds United | 2019–20 | Championship | 3 | 1 | 0 | 0 | 0 | 0 | – | | 3 | 1 |
| Leeds United | 2020–21 | Premier League | 22 | 3 | 1 | 0 | 0 | 0 | – | | 15 | 3 |
| Leeds United | 2021–22 | Premier League | 1 | 0 | 0 | 0 | 1 | 0 | – | | 2 | 0 |
| Leeds United | Total | | 66 | 7 | 2 | 0 | 3 | 1 | – | | 71 | 8 |
| Valencia (loan) | 2021–22 | La Liga | 22 | 0 | 5 | 0 | — | | — | | 27 | 0 |
| Al-Ittihad (loan) | 2022–23 | Saudi Pro League | 18 | 3 | 2 | 0 | — | | — | | 20 | 3 |
| Estoril Praia | 2024–25 | Primeira Liga | 5 | 0 | 0 | 0 | — | | — | | 5 | 0 |
| Yunnan Yukun | 2025 | Chinese Super League | 0 | 0 | 0 | 0 | — | | — | | 0 | 0 |
| Career total | | | 310 | 44 | 21 | 3 | 8 | 3 | 0 | 0 | 339 | 50 |

=== International ===
Scores and results list Portugal or Angola's goal tally first, score column indicates score after each Costa goal.

List of international goals scored by Hélder Costa
| No. | Team | Date | Venue | Opponent | Score | Result | Competition |
|---|---|---|---|---|---|---|---|
| 1 | Portugal | 14 October 2018 | Hampden Park, Glasgow, Scotland | Scotland | 1–0 | 3–1 | Friendly |
| 2 | Angola | 12 November 2021 | Estádio 11 de Novembro, Luanda, Angola | Egypt | 1–0 | 2–2 | 2022 FIFA World Cup qualificafion |

== Honours ==
Benfica

- Taça da Liga: 2013–14

Wolverhampton Wanderers

- EFL Championship: 2017–18

Leeds United

- EFL Championship: 2019–20

Al-Ittihad

- Saudi Pro League: 2022–23

Individual

- UEFA European Under-19 Championship Team of the Tournament: 2013
- Wolverhampton Wanderers Player of the Year: 2016–17
- Wolverhampton Wanderers Players' Player of the Year Award: 2016–17
- Wolverhampton Wanderers Goal of the Season: 2016–17
