= Connor Hunte =

English footballer (born 1996)

Personal information
- Date of birth: 12 September 1996 (age 30)
- Place of birth: Surrey, England
- Position: Winger

Team information
- Current team: Dulwich Hamlet

Youth career
- 2005–2006: Sutton United
- 2006–2013: Chelsea
- 2014–2015: Wolverhampton Wanderers

Senior career*
Years	Team	Apps	(Gls)
2015–2017	Wolverhampton Wanderers	2	(0)
2016–2017	→ Stevenage (loan)	3	(1)
2017–2018	Greenwich Borough	4	(2)
2018	Kingstonian		
2018–2019	Billericay Town		
2019	→ Dulwich Hamlet (loan)		
2019–2020	Dulwich Hamlet		
2020	→ Worthing (loan)		

International career
2011	England U16	7	(1)
2012	England U17	3	(0)
- * Club domestic league appearances and goals as of 2 July 2018

Connor Hunte (born 12 September 1996) is an English former footballer.

== Career ==
Hunte was a member of Chelsea's academy and signed a scholarship with the club in January 2013, but was released seven months later. After having spent a period training with Wolverhampton Wanderers, he signed a contract with the Championship side in summer 2014.

He made his professional debut on 8 March 2016 as a substitute in a 2–1 victory against Bristol City. The following month he made his second and final appearance for the club when he came on as a substitute against Blackburn Rovers.

Hunte was loaned out to League Two club Stevenage at the start of the following season, where he made a total of six appearances, scoring once, before returning to Molineux. It was announced on 13 January 2017 that Hunte's contract with Wolves had been terminated by mutual consent.

On 10 August 2017, he signed for Isthmian League South Division club Greenwich Borough.

On 20 May 2018, Hunte signed for National League South club Billericay Town. Hunte was loaned out to Dulwich Hamlet on 22 March 2019 for the rest of the season. The deal was made permanent on 14 June 2019.

He joined Worthing on loan in February 2020.
