= 2014–15 West Bromwich Albion F.C. season =

West Bromwich Albion
2014–15 season
- Chairman: Jeremy Peace
- Manager: Alan Irvine (until 29 December); Rob Kelly (caretaker); Tony Pulis (from 1 January)
- Stadium: The Hawthorns
- Premier League: 13th
- FA Cup: Sixth round (knocked out by Aston Villa)
- League Cup: Fourth round (knocked out by Bournemouth)
- Top goalscorer: League: Saido Berahino (14); All: Saido Berahino (20)
- Highest home attendance: 26,768 vs. Leicester City (11 April, Premier League)
- Lowest home attendance: 10,939 vs. Oxford United (26 August, League Cup)
- Average home league attendance: 25,064
Home colours	Away colours

The 2014–15 season was West Bromwich Albion's fifth consecutive season in the Premier League, their ninth in total. The season was notable for West Brom ditching the traditional white and navy stripes kit in favour of white and navy pinstripes kit, which angered many supporters. Eventually, the white and navy stripes kit was brought back the following season. During the season, they also competed in the FA Cup. West Brom were knocked out of the League Cup in the fourth round, losing away to Bournemouth. The club exited the FA Cup in the sixth round, after they were beaten by local rivals Aston Villa.

On 6 November 2014, Albion unveiled a statue to their record goalscorer Tony "Bomber" Brown outside the East Stand of The Hawthorns. A few days later, prior to the club's home match against Newcastle United, a blue plaque was unveiled in memory of Harold Bache, a former Albion player who was killed in action during the First World War. The plaque was subsequently mounted on the outside of the East Stand, opposite the statue of Brown.

Alan Irvine was sacked as head coach on 29 December, after a run of poor results, with Tony Pulis appointed as his replacement three days later.

During every home match throughout the season, the Albion fans applauded through the ninth minute of the match in support of the Justice for Jeff campaign. This concluded on 11 April 2015 when, for their home match against Leicester City, the Jeff Astle Foundation was launched. To promote this, and in memory of Jeff Astle, the players took to the pitch in a plain white kit, a replica of their 1968 FA Cup winning shirts. The kit featured no sponsors and was numbered 2–11 (with the goalkeeper in a blank kit).

In March 2015 a new Premier League record was set in the match between West Bromwich Albion and Manchester City for the biggest difference between the number of shots on target by two opposing teams (16 by Manchester City, 0 by Albion). This record still stands as of December 2016.

== Players ==
=== First-team squad ===
Squad at end of season

Note: Flags indicate national team as defined under FIFA eligibility rules; some limited exceptions apply. Players may hold more than one non-FIFA nationality.

No.	Pos.	Nation	Player
1	GK	ENG	Ben Foster
2	DF	ENG	Andre Wisdom (on loan from Liverpool)
3	DF	SWE	Jonas Olsson
4	DF	NIR	Chris Baird
5	MF	ARG	Claudio Yacob
6	DF	ENG	Joleon Lescott
7	MF	SCO	James Morrison (Note: Morrison was born in Darlington, England, and represented them at U-17, U-18, U-19, and U-21 level, but also qualified to represent Scotland internationally through his grandparents and made his international debut for Scotland in May 2008.)
8	MF	ENG	Craig Gardner
9	FW	NGA	Brown Ideye
10	FW	NGA	Victor Anichebe
11	MF	NIR	Chris Brunt
13	GK	WAL	Boaz Myhill (Note: Myhill was born in Modesto, California, United States, but was raised in England from the age of 1, qualifying to represent any of the home nations. He represented England at U-17, U-18, and U-20 level before making his international debut for Wales in March 2008.)
14	DF	AUS	Jason Davidson
15	DF	BEL	Sébastien Pocognoli
16	DF	CRC	Cristian Gamboa
17	MF	SCO	Graham Dorrans

No.	Pos.	Nation	Player
18	FW	ENG	Saido Berahino (Note: Berahino was born in Bujumbura, Burundi, but was raised in England from the age of 10 and represented them at every youth level between U-16 and U-21 level before making his international debut for Burundi in September 2018.)
19	MF	ENG	Callum McManaman
20	DF	ENG	Liam O'Neil
21	MF	COD	Youssuf Mulumbu (Note: Mulumbu was born in Kinshasa, Zaire (now Democratic Republic of the Congo), but also qualified to represent France internationally and represented them at U-20 and U-21 level before making his international debut for the Democratic Republic of the Congo in March 2008.)
23	DF	NIR	Gareth McAuley
24	MF	SCO	Darren Fletcher
25	DF	ENG	Craig Dawson
29	MF	BEN	Stéphane Sessègnon
33	DF	IRL	Bradley Garmston (Note: Garmston was born in Chorley, England, but also qualified to represent the Republic of Ireland internationally and represented them at U-17, U-19 and U-21 level.)
34	FW	ENG	Kemar Roofe
36	MF	ENG	Adil Nabi
37	MF	ENG	Mani O'Sullivan
38	GK	ENG	Jack Rose
40	GK	ENG	Alex Palmer
43	DF	ENG	Callam Jones
44	FW	WAL	Tyler Roberts (Note: Roberts was born in Gloucester, England, but also qualified to represent Wales internationally through two grandparents and represented them at every youth level between U-17 and U-21 level before making his international debut for Wales in September 2018.)

=== Left club during season ===
Note: Flags indicate national team as defined under FIFA eligibility rules; some limited exceptions apply. Players may hold more than one non-FIFA nationality.

No.	Pos.	Nation	Player
19	GK	ENG	Luke Daniels (to Scunthorpe United)
22	DF	MSR	Donervon Daniels (on loan to Aberdeen)
27	MF	POR	Silvestre Varela (on loan from Porto)

No.	Pos.	Nation	Player
28	MF	ARG	Sebastián Blanco (on loan to San Lorenzo)
30	FW	GRE	Georgios Samaras (on loan to Al-Hilal)

== Non-competitive ==
=== Pre-season ===
West Bromwich Albion's pre-season friendlies were announced on 22 May 2014, with several matches confirmed by the club later in the summer.
All times listed are in BST unless stated.

12 July 2014	West Bromwich Albion	2–0	Bury	Great Barr
12:00	Dorrans 54'; Berahino 77'	Report		Stadium: West Brom training ground Attendance: Behind closed doors

15 July 2014	Shrewsbury Town	1–2	West Bromwich Albion	Shrewsbury
19:45	Vernon 30'	Report	Anichebe 12'; Mulumbu 34'	Stadium: New Meadow; Attendance: 2,831; Referee: C Sargeson

19 July 2014	West Bromwich Albion XI	0–0	Wycombe Wanderers	Great Barr
15:00		Report		Stadium: West Brom training ground Attendance: Behind closed doors

21 July 2014	Sacramento Republic (United States)	0–1	West Bromwich Albion	California
19:30 PST; 03:30 BST (22 July 2014)		Report	Dorrans 13' (pen.)	Stadium: Bonney Field; Attendance: 7,461; Referee: Matthew Buckman

25 July 2014	Sacramento Republic (United States)	1–3	West Bromwich Albion	California
19:30 PST; 03:30 BST (22 July 2014)	Koval 73'	Report	Berahino 13'; Mulumbu 30'; Anichebe 61'	Stadium: Bonney Field; Attendance: 8,000; Referee: Michael Zapata

2 August 2014	Nottingham Forest	1–0	West Bromwich Albion	Nottingham
13:30	Fryatt 25'	Report		Stadium: City Ground; Attendance: 6,423 (1,098 Albion fans); Referee: Andre Marriner

5 August 2014	Port Vale	3–2	West Bromwich Albion	Stoke-on-Trent
19:45	Williamson 18'; Pope 27'; Dawson 85' (o.g.)	Report	Roofe 5'; Garmston 49'	Stadium: Vale Park; Attendance: 2,145 (400 Albion fans); Referee: Rob Lewis

9 August 2014	West Bromwich Albion	1–3	(Portugal) Porto	West Bromwich
16:00	Olsson 40'	Report	Casemiro 22'; Martínez 51', 54'	Stadium: The Hawthorns; Attendance: 8,670; Referee: Neil Swarbrick

== Competitions ==
=== Overall ===
Competition	Started round	Final position/round	First match	Last match	Record							
Competition	Started round	Final position/round	First match	Last match	Pld	W	D	L	GF	GA	GD	Win %
Premier League	—	13th	16 August 2014	24 May 2015	38	11	11	16	38	51	–13	29%
League Cup	2nd round	4th round	26 August 2014	28 October 2014	3	1	1	1	5	5	0	33%
FA Cup	3rd round	6th round	3 January 2015	7 March 2015	4	3	0	1	13	3	+10	75%
Total					45	15	12	18	56	59	-3	33%

Astle Day kit

=== Premier League ===
==== League table ====
Pos	Team	Pld	W	D	L	GF	GA	GD	Pts	Qualification or relegation
11	Everton	38	12	11	15	48	50	−2	47	
12	West Ham United	38	12	11	15	44	47	−3	47	Qualification for the Europa League first qualifying round (Note: England was given an extra qualification berth for the Europa League first qualifying round as one of the top three associations in UEFA Respect Fair Play ranking. The spot was given to West Ham United after finishing on top of the Premier League Fair Play table.)
13	West Bromwich Albion	38	11	11	16	38	51	−13	44	
14	Leicester City	38	11	8	19	46	55	−9	41	
15	Newcastle United	38	10	9	19	40	63	−23	39	

Source: Barclays Premier League
Rules for classification: 1) Points; 2) Goal difference; 3) Goals scored; 4) Play-offs (only if needed to decide champion, teams for relegation or teams for UEFA competitions).

==== Results summary ====
Overall								Home						Away					
Pld	W	D	L	GF	GA	GD	Pts	W	D	L	GF	GA	GD	W	D	L	GF	GA	GD
38	11	11	16	38	51	−13	44	7	4	8	24	26	−2	4	7	8	14	25	−11

Source: Premier League

==== Results by matchday ====
Matchday	1	2	3	4	5	6	7	8	9	10	11	12	13	14	15	16	17	18	19	20	21	22	23	24	25	26	27	28	29	30	31	32	33	34	35	36	37	38
Ground	H	A	A	H	A	H	A	H	H	A	H	A	H	H	A	H	A	H	A	A	H	A	H	A	H	A	H	A	H	A	H	H	A	H	A	A	H	A
Result	D	D	L	L	W	W	L	D	D	W	L	L	L	L	D	W	L	L	L	D	W	D	L	D	W	D	W	L	W	L	L	L	W	D	W	D	W	L
Position	6	11	17	19	16	10	13	14	12	10	13	13	15	16	16	14	14	15	16	17	14	14	15	15	14	14	13	13	13	13	14	14	13	13	13	13	13	13

Source: Statto.com
A = Away; H = Home; W = Win; D = Draw; L = Loss

==== Matches ====
The fixtures for the 2014–15 season were announced on 18 June 2014.

All times listed are local time (BST or GMT).

16 August 2014 1	West Bromwich Albion	2–2	Sunderland	West Bromwich
15:00	Berahino 42' (pen.), 74'	Report	Cattermole 5'; Larsson 85'	Stadium: The Hawthorns; Attendance: 25,468 (2,594 away); Referee: Neil Swarbrick

23 August 2014 2	Southampton	0–0	West Bromwich Albion	Southampton
15:00		Report		Stadium: St Mary's Stadium; Attendance: 27,598 (1,337 away); Referee: Roger East

30 August 2014 3	Swansea City	3–0	West Bromwich Albion	Swansea
15:00	Dyer 2', 71'; Routledge 24'	Report		Stadium: Liberty Stadium; Attendance: 20,318; Referee: Paul Tierney

13 September 2014 4	West Bromwich Albion	0–2	Everton	West Bromwich
15:00		Report	Lukaku 2'; Mirallas 66'	Stadium: The Hawthorns; Attendance: 23,567 (2,588 away); Referee: Anthony Taylor

21 September 2014 5	Tottenham Hotspur	0–1	West Bromwich Albion	Tottenham
13:30		Report	Morrison 74'	Stadium: White Hart Lane; Attendance: 35,861 (1,287 away); Referee: Kevin Friend

28 September 2014 6	West Bromwich Albion	4–0	Burnley	West Bromwich
16:00	Dawson 30'; Berahino 45', 56'; Dorrans 90'	Report		Stadium: The Hawthorns; Attendance: 24,286 (1,500 away); Referee: Jonathan Moss

4 October 2014 7	Liverpool	2–1	West Bromwich Albion	Liverpool
15:00	Lallana 45'; Henderson 61'	Report	Berahino 56' (pen.)	Stadium: Anfield; Attendance: 44,708 (1,832 away); Referee: Michael Oliver

20 October 2014 8	West Bromwich Albion	2–2	Manchester United	West Bromwich
20:00	Sessègnon 8'; Berahino 66'	Report	Fellaini 48'; Blind 87'	Stadium: The Hawthorns; Attendance: 25,794 (2,593 away); Referee: Mike Dean

25 October 2014 9	West Bromwich Albion	2–2	Crystal Palace	West Bromwich
15:00	Anichebe 51'; Berahino 90+3' (pen.)	Report	Hangeland 16'; Jedinak 45+1' (pen.)	Stadium: The Hawthorns; Attendance: 24,738 (2,589 away); Referee: Mark Clattenburg

1 November 2014 10	Leicester City	0–1	West Bromwich Albion	Leicester
15:00		Report	Cambiasso 47' (o.g.)	Stadium: King Power Stadium; Attendance: 31,819 (3,300 away); Referee: Stuart Attwell

9 November 2014 11	West Bromwich Albion	0–2	Newcastle United	West Bromwich
13:30		Report	Pérez 45'; Coloccini 62'	Stadium: The Hawthorns; Attendance: 26,476 (2,589 away); Referee: Craig Pawson

22 November 2014 12	Chelsea	2–0	West Bromwich Albion	London
15:00	Costa 11'; Hazard 25'	Report	Yacob (red card) 29'	Stadium: Stamford Bridge; Attendance: 41,600 (1,482 away); Referee: Lee Mason

29 November 2014 13	West Bromwich Albion	0–1	Arsenal	West Bromwich
12:45		Report	Welbeck 60'	Stadium: The Hawthorns; Attendance: 24,228 (2,600 away); Referee: Chris Foy

2 December 2014 14	West Bromwich Albion	1–2	West Ham United	West Bromwich
20:00	Dawson 10'	Report	Nolan 35'; Tomkins 45'	Stadium: The Hawthorns; Attendance: 23,975 (2,592 away); Referee: Mike Jones

6 December 2014 15	Hull City	0–0	West Bromwich Albion	Kingston upon Hull
15:00		Report		Stadium: KC Stadium; Attendance: 23,279 (1,654 away); Referee: Michael Oliver

13 December 2014 16	West Bromwich Albion	1–0	Aston Villa	West Bromwich
15:00	Gardner 72'	Report	Richardson (red card) 22'	Stadium: The Hawthorns; Attendance: 24,684 (2,600 away); Referee: Mike Dean

20 December 2014 17	Queens Park Rangers	3–2	West Bromwich Albion	London
15:00	Austin 24' (pen.), 48', 86'	Report	Lescott 10'; Varela 20'	Stadium: Loftus Road; Attendance: 17,560 (1,633 away); Referee: Craig Pawson

26 December 2014 18	West Bromwich Albion	1–3	Manchester City	West Bromwich
15:00	Ideye 87'	Report	Fernando 8'; Touré 13' (pen.); Silva 34'	Stadium: The Hawthorns; Attendance: 26,040 (2,600 away); Referee: Mark Clattenburg

28 December 2014 19	Stoke City	2–0	West Bromwich Albion	Stoke-on-Trent
15:00	Diouf 51', 66'	Report		Stadium: Britannia Stadium; Attendance: 27,070 (2,510 away); Referee: Roger East

1 January 2015 20	West Ham United	1–1	West Bromwich Albion	London
15:00	Sakho 10'	Report	Berahino 42'	Stadium: Upton Park; Attendance: 34,914 (883 away); Referee: Jonathan Moss

10 January 2015 21	West Bromwich Albion	1–0	Hull City	West Bromwich
15:00	Berahino 78'	Report		Stadium: The Hawthorns; Attendance: 24,818 (1,612 away); Referee: Neil Swarbrick

19 January 2015 22	Everton	0–0	West Bromwich Albion	Liverpool
20:00		Report		Stadium: Goodison Park; Attendance: 34,739 (608 away); Referee: Michael Oliver

31 January 2015 23	West Bromwich Albion	0–3	Tottenham Hotspur	West Bromwich
15:00		Report	Eriksen 6'; Kane 15' (pen.), 64'	Stadium: The Hawthorns; Attendance: 25,079 (2,600 away); Referee: Kevin Friend

8 February 2015 24	Burnley	2–2	West Bromwich Albion	Burnley
12:00	Barnes 11'; Ings 32'	Report	Brunt 45+1'; Ideye 67'	Stadium: Turf Moor; Attendance: 16,904; Referee: Mike Dean

11 February 2015 25	West Bromwich Albion	2–0	Swansea City	West Bromwich
20:00	Ideye 60'; Berahino 74'	Report		Stadium: The Hawthorns; Attendance: 23,516 (1,447 away); Referee: Robert Madley

21 February 2015 26	Sunderland	0–0	West Bromwich Albion	Sunderland
15:00		Report		Stadium: Stadium of Light; Attendance: 40,943 (1,274 away); Referee: Mike Jones

28 February 2015 27	West Bromwich Albion	1–0	Southampton	West Bromwich
15:00	Berahino 2'	Report		Stadium: The Hawthorns; Attendance: 25,303 (2,600 away); Referee: Phil Dowd

3 March 2015 28	Aston Villa	2–1	West Bromwich Albion	Birmingham
19:45	Agbonlahor 22'; Benteke 90+4' (pen.)	Report	Berahino 66'	Stadium: Villa Park; Attendance: 31,272 (2,800 away); Referee: Jonathan Moss

14 March 2015 29	West Bromwich Albion	1–0	Stoke City	West Bromwich
15:00	Ideye 19'	Report		Stadium: The Hawthorns; Attendance: 24,323 (2,596 away); Referee: Michael Oliver

21 March 2015 30	Manchester City	3–0	West Bromwich Albion	Manchester
12:45	Bony 27'; Fernando 40'; Silva 77'	Report	McAuley (red card) 2'	Stadium: Etihad Stadium; Attendance: 45,018 (886 away); Referee: Neil Swarbrick

4 April 2015 31	West Bromwich Albion	1–4	Queens Park Rangers	West Bromwich
15:00	Anichebe 58'; Mulumbu (red card) 84'	Report	Vargas 15'; Austin 37'; Zamora 43'; Barton 90+5'	Stadium: The Hawthorns; Attendance: 25,735; Referee: Lee Probert

11 April 2015 32	West Bromwich Albion	2–3	Leicester City	West Bromwich
15:00	Fletcher 8'; Gardner 26'	Report	Nugent 20'; Huth 80'; Vardy 90'	Stadium: The Hawthorns; Attendance: 26,768 (2,600 away); Referee: Martin Atkinson

18 April 2015 33	Crystal Palace	0–2	West Bromwich Albion	London
15:00		Report	Morrison 2'; Gardner 53'	Stadium: Selhurst Park; Attendance: 22,765 (2,500 away); Referee: Jonathon Moss

25 April 2015 34	West Bromwich Albion	0–0	Liverpool	West Bromwich
15:00		Report		Stadium: The Hawthorns; Attendance: 26,663 (2,600 away); Referee: Roger East

2 May 2015 35	Manchester United	0–1	West Bromwich Albion	Manchester
17:30		Report	Olsson 63'	Stadium: Old Trafford; Attendance: 75,454 (550 away); Referee: Anthony Taylor

9 May 2015 36	Newcastle United	1–1	West Bromwich Albion	Newcastle
15:00	Pérez 41'	Report	Anichebe 32'	Stadium: St James' Park; Attendance: 47,894 (2,584 away); Referee: Chris Foy

18 May 2015 37	West Bromwich Albion	3–0	Chelsea	West Bromwich
20:00	Berahino 9', 47' (pen.); Brunt 60'	Report	Fàbregas (red card) 29'	Stadium: The Hawthorns; Attendance: 24,750 (2,600 away); Referee: Mike Jones

24 May 2015 38	Arsenal	4–1	West Bromwich Albion	London
15:00	Walcott 4', 14', 37'; Wilshere 17'	Report	McAuley 57'	Stadium: Emirates Stadium; Attendance: 59,971 (2,980 away); Referee: Robert Madley

=== FA Cup ===
As a Premier League side, West Brom entered the FA Cup in the third round.

3 January 2015 3rd round	West Bromwich Albion	7–0	Gateshead	West Bromwich
15:00	Berahino 42', 46', 53', 90+2'; Anichebe 45+1'; Brunt 55'; Morrison 79'	Report		Stadium: The Hawthorns; Attendance: 16,593 (1,412 away); Referee: Andy Madley

24 January 2015 4th round	Birmingham City	1–2	West Bromwich Albion	Birmingham
15:00	Grounds 45'	Report	Anichebe 25', 35'	Stadium: St Andrew's; Attendance: 28,438 (5,700 away); Referee: Mark Clattenburg

14 February 2015 5th round	West Bromwich Albion	4–0	West Ham United	West Bromwich
12:45	Ideye 20', 57'; Morrison 42'; Berahino 72'	Report		Stadium: The Hawthorns; Attendance: 19,956 (5,200 away); Referee: Martin Atkinson

7 March 2015 6th round	Aston Villa	2–0	West Bromwich Albion	Birmingham
17:30	Delph 51'; Sinclair 85'	Report		Stadium: Villa Park; Attendance: 39,592 (6,500 away); Referee: Anthony Taylor

=== League Cup ===
As a Premier League team, West Brom entered the League Cup in the second round.

26 August 2014 2nd round	West Bromwich Albion	1–1 (a.e.t.) (7–6 p)	Oxford United	West Bromwich
20:00	Mullins 29' (o.g.)	Report	Hylton 86'; Brown (yellow card) 52' (yellow-red card) 111'	Stadium: The Hawthorns; Attendance: 10,939 (2,521 away); Referee: James Adcock
	Penalties
	Morrison (penalty missed); Ideye (penalty missed); Mulumbu (penalty scored); Berahino (penalty scored); Yacob (penalty scored); Dawson (penalty scored); Wisdom (penalty scored); Gamboa (penalty scored); Davidson (penalty scored)		(penalty scored) Hylton; (penalty missed) Collins; (penalty missed) Newey; (penalty scored) Hoskins; (penalty scored) Hunt; (penalty scored) Jakubiak; (penalty scored) Ruffels; (penalty scored) Mullins; (penalty missed) Wright

24 September 2014 3rd round	West Bromwich Albion	3–2	Hull City	West Bromwich
20:00	Ideye 15'; McAuley 87'; Berahino 88'	Report	Ince 41'; Brady 50'	Stadium: The Hawthorns; Attendance: 10,496 (472 away); Referee: Phil Dowd

28 October 2014 4th round	Bournemouth	2–1	West Bromwich Albion	Bournemouth
19:45	O'Kane 49'; Wilson 87'	Report	Elphick 85' (o.g.)	Stadium: Dean Court; Attendance: 11,296 (2,100 away); Referee: Paul Tierney

== Player statistics ==
=== First team squad ===
Appearances include starts and substitute appearances. Yellow and red cards are from all competitive competitions.

No.	Pos.	Nat.	Name	Premier League		FA Cup		League Cup		Total		Discipline	
No.	Pos.	Nat.	Name	Apps	Goals	Apps	Goals	Apps	Goals	Apps	Goals	Yellow card	Red card
1	GK	ENG	Ben Foster	28	0	2	0	0	0	30	0	2	0
2	DF	ENG	Andre Wisdom	24	0	1	0	1	0	26	0	1	0
3	DF	SWE	Jonas Olsson	13	1	1	0	1	0	15	1	2	0
4	DF	NIR	Chris Baird	19	0	3	0	2	0	24	0	2	0
5	MF	ARG	Claudio Yacob	20	0	4	0	2	0	25	0	5	2
6	DF	ENG	Joleon Lescott	34	1	3	0	0	0	37	1	3	0
7	MF	SCO	James Morrison	33	2	3	1	1	0	37	3	3	0
8	MF	ENG	Craig Gardner	35	3	3	0	0	0	38	3	10	0
9	FW	NGA	Brown Ideye	24	4	3	2	3	1	30	7	2	0
10	FW	NGA	Victor Anichebe	21	3	2	3	2	0	25	6	0	0
11	MF	NIR	Chris Brunt	34	2	4	1	1	0	39	3	5	0
13	GK	WAL	Boaz Myhill	11	0	3	0	3	0	17	0	1	0
14	DF	AUS	Jason Davidson	2	0	0	0	3	0	5	0	0	0
15	DF	BEL	Sébastien Pocognoli	15	0	1	0	0	0	16	0	1	0
16	DF	CRC	Cristian Gamboa	10	0	1	0	3	0	14	0	2	0
17	MF	SCO	Graham Dorrans	21	1	1	0	0	0	22	1	5	0
18	FW	ENG	Saido Berahino	38	14	4	5	3	1	45	20	2	0
19	MF	ENG	Callum McManaman	8	0	2	0	0	0	10	0	1	0
20	DF	ENG	Liam O'Neil	0	0	0	0	2	0	2	0	0	0
21	MF	COD	Youssouf Mulumbu	17	0	1	0	3	0	21	0	2	1
23	DF	NIR	Gareth McAuley	24	1	4	0	3	1	31	2	2	1
24	MF	SCO	Darren Fletcher	15	1	0	0	0	0	15	1	2	0
25	DF	ENG	Craig Dawson	29	2	4	0	2	0	34	2	7	0
27	MF	POR	Silvestre Varela	7	1	1	0	1	0	9	1	1	0
28	MF	ARG	Sebastián Blanco	3	0	0	0	2	0	5	0	1	0
29	MF	BEN	Stéphane Sessègnon	28	1	3	0	2	0	33	1	5	0
30	FW	GRE	Georgios Samaras	5	0	1	0	2	0	8	0	0	0
33	DF	IRL	Bradley Garmston	0	0	0	0	0	0	0	0	0	0
34	MF	ENG	Kemar Roofe	0	0	0	0	0	0	0	0	0	0
36	FW	ENG	Adil Nabi	0	0	0	0	0	0	0	0	0	0
37	MF	ENG	Mani O'Sullivan	0	0	0	0	0	0	0	0	0	0
43	DF	ENG	Callam Jones	0	0	0	0	0	0	0	0	0	0

Last updated: 24 May 2015
Sources: West Bromwich Albion and Soccerbase

=== Top goalscorers ===
Name	Premier League	FA Cup	League Cup	Total
Saido Berahino	14	5	1	20
Brown Ideye	4	2	1	7
Victor Anichebe	3	3	0	6
James Morrison	2	2	0	4
Chris Brunt	2	1	0	3
Craig Gardner	3	0	0	3
Own goals	1	0	2	3
Craig Dawson	2	0	0	2
Gareth McAuley	1	0	1	2
Graham Dorrans	1	0	0	1
Darren Fletcher	1	0	0	1
Joleon Lescott	1	0	0	1
Jonas Olsson	1	0	0	1
Stéphane Sessègnon	1	0	0	1
Silvestre Varela	1	0	0	1
Total	38	13	5	56

Source: West Bromwich Albion, BBC

== Transfers and loans ==
=== Transfers in ===
Date	Pos.	No.	Name	From	Fee	Ref
1 July 2014 (Note: Gardner's signing was announced on 20 May 2014, but joined Albion officially on 1 July 2014, after his Sunderland contract expired.)	MF	8	(England) Craig Gardner	(England) Sunderland	Free	
1 July 2014 (Note: Lescott's signing was announced on 20 June 2014, but joined Albion officially on 1 July 2014, after his Manchester City contract expired.)	DF	6	(England) Joleon Lescott	(England) Manchester City	Free	
7 July 2014	DF	4	(Northern Ireland) Chris Baird	(England) Burnley	Free	
12 July 2014	DF	15	(Belgium) Sébastien Pocognoli	(Germany) Hannover 96	£1,500,000	
18 July 2014	FW	9	(Nigeria) Brown Ideye	(Ukraine) Dynamo Kyiv	Undisclosed (Note: The price paid for Ideye was officially undisclosed, but was reported by local media to be around £10 million.)	
5 August 2014	DF	14	(Australia) Jason Davidson	(Netherlands) Heracles Almelo	Undisclosed	
5 August 2014	DF	16	(Costa Rica) Cristian Gamboa	(Norway) Rosenborg	Undisclosed	
22 August 2014	FW	30	(Greece) Giorgos Samaras	(Scotland) Celtic	Free	
30 August 2014	MF	28	(Argentina) Sebastián Blanco	(Ukraine) Metalist Kharkiv	Undisclosed	
28 January 2015	MF	19	(England) Callum McManaman	(England) Wigan Athletic	£4,750,000	
2 February 2015	MF	24	(Scotland) Darren Fletcher	(England) Manchester United	Free	

=== Transfers out ===
Date	Pos.	No.	Name	From	To	Ref
19 July 2014	MF	15	(England) George Thorne	(England) Derby County	Undisclosed	
21 January 2015	GK	19	(England) Luke Daniels	(England) Scunthorpe United	Undisclosed	

=== Loans in ===
Date	Pos.	No.	Name	From	Type	Ref
22 July 2014	DF	2	(England) Andre Wisdom	(England) Liverpool	30 June 2015	
24 August 2014	MF	27	(Portugal) Silvestre Varela	(Portugal) Porto	20 January 2015	

=== Loans out ===
Date	Pos.	No.	Name	From	Type	Ref
1 August 2014	DF	22	(Montserrat) Donervon Daniels	(England) Blackpool	Until 2 January (Note: Daniels was originally loaned to Blackpool for 28 days, but this loan was extended on 22 August to finish on 2 January.)	
29 September 2014	DF	44	(England) Reiss Greenidge	(England) Port Vale	Until 31 December 2014	
4 November 2014	MF	34	(England) Kemar Roofe	(England) Colchester United	Until 1 December 2014	
13 November 2014	DF	20	(England) Liam O'Neil	(England) Scunthorpe United	Until 30 June 2015 (Note: O'Neil was originally loaned to Scunthorpe United for 2 months, but this loan was extended on 12 January to finish at end of season.)	
27 November 2014	DF	48	(England) Wes Atkinson	(England) Cambridge United	Until 3 January 2015	
16 January 2015	DF	33	(Republic of Ireland) Bradley Garmston	(England) Gillingham	Until 15 March 2015 (Note: Garmston was originally loaned to Gillingham for 28 days, but this loan was extended on 16 February to finish on 15 March.)	
27 January 2015	DF	22	(Montserrat) Donervon Daniels	(Scotland) Aberdeen	Until 30 June	
5 February 2015	MF	30	(Greece) Georgios Samaras	(Saudi Arabia) Al-Hilal	Until 30 June	
13 February 2015	MF	34	(England) Kemar Roofe	(England) Oxford United	Until 30 June (Note: Roofe was originally loaned to Oxford United for 28 days, but this loan was extended on 12 March to finish on 30 June.)	
17 February 2015	MF	17	(Scotland) Graham Dorrans	(England) Norwich City	Until 30 June (Note: Dorrans was originally loaned to Norwich City for 28 days, but this loan was extended on 26 March to finish on 30 June.)	

=== Released ===
Date	Pos.	No.	Name	To	Type	Ref
16 May 2014	DF	2	(Republic of Ireland) Steven Reid	(England) Burnley	Free	
16 May 2014	DF	6	(England) Liam Ridgewell	(United States) Portland Timbers	Free	
16 May 2014	DF	14	(Uruguay) Diego Lugano	Released	Free	
16 May 2014	MF	22	(Hungary) Zoltán Gera	(Hungary) Ferencváros	Free	
16 May 2014	MF	—	(Scotland) Scott Allan	(Scotland) Hibernian	Free	
16 May 2014	DF	4	(North Macedonia) Goran Popov	(Ukraine) Dynamo Kyiv	Loan return	
16 May 2014	MF	10	(England) Scott Sinclair	(England) Manchester City	Loan return	
16 May 2014	MF	18	(France) Morgan Amalfitano	(France) Marseille	Loan return	
16 May 2014	FW	20	(Czech Republic) Matěj Vydra	(Italy) Udinese	Loan return	
16 May 2014	FW	50	(Republic of the Congo) Thievy Bifouma	(Spain) Espanyol	Loan return	
28 May 2014	DF	28	(England) Billy Jones	(England) Sunderland	Free	
10 July 2014	DF	41	(England) Cameron Gayle	(England) Shrewsbury Town	Free	
