= 2013–14 West Bromwich Albion F.C. season =

West Bromwich Albion
2013–14 season
- Chairman: Jeremy Peace
- Head Coach: Steve Clarke (until 14 December); Keith Downing (caretaker); Pepe Mel (from 9 January)
- Stadium: The Hawthorns
- Premier League: 17th
- FA Cup: Third round
- League Cup: Third round
- Top goalscorer: League: Saido Berahino (5); Stéphane Sessègnon (5); All: Saido Berahino (9)
- Highest home attendance: 26,613 vs. Stoke City (11 May 2014, Premier League)
- Lowest home attendance: 8,955 vs. Newport County (27 August 2013, League Cup)
- Average home league attendance: 25,194
Home colours	Away colours	Third colours

The 2013–14 season was West Bromwich Albion's fourth consecutive season in the Premier League, their eighth in total. During the season, they also competed in the League Cup and the FA Cup.

== Season summary ==
Steve Clarke was sacked in December following four consecutive defeats, which left Albion in 16th place. He was replaced by former Real Betis manager Pepe Mel, who guided Albion to safety despite only winning 3 of his 18 matches in charge. At the end of the season, Mel's contract was terminated by mutual consent; he was replaced by Everton's academy manager Alan Irvine.

== Players ==
=== First-team squad ===
Squad at end of season

Note: Flags indicate national team as defined under FIFA eligibility rules; some limited exceptions apply. Players may hold more than one non-FIFA nationality.

No.	Pos.	Nation	Player
1	GK	ENG	Ben Foster
2	DF	IRL	Steven Reid (Note: Reid was born in Kingston upon Thames, England, and represented them at U-16 level, but also qualified to represent the Republic of Ireland internationally through his grandfather and made his international debut for the Republic of Ireland in 2001.)
3	DF	SWE	Jonas Olsson
4	DF	MKD	Goran Popov (on loan from Dynamo Kyiv)
5	MF	ARG	Claudio Yacob
6	DF	ENG	Liam Ridgewell
7	MF	SCO	James Morrison (Note: Morrison was born in Darlington, England, and represented them at U-17, U-18, U-19, and U-21 level, but also qualified to represent Scotland internationally through his grandparents and made his international debut for Scotland in May 2008.)
10	FW	ENG	Scott Sinclair (on loan from Manchester City)
11	MF	NIR	Chris Brunt
13	GK	WAL	Boaz Myhill (Note: Myhill was born in Modesto, California, United States, but was raised in England from the age of 1, qualifying to represent any of the home nations. He represented England at U-17, U-18, and U-20 level before making his international debut for Wales in March 2008.)
14	DF	URU	Diego Lugano
16	FW	NGR	Victor Anichebe
17	MF	SCO	Graham Dorrans
18	MF	FRA	Morgan Amalfitano (on loan from Marseille)
19	GK	ENG	Luke Daniels
20	FW	CZE	Matěj Vydra (on loan from Udinese)

No.	Pos.	Nation	Player
21	MF	COD	Youssuf Mulumbu (Note: Mulumbu was born in Kinshasa, Zaire (now Democratic Republic of the Congo), but also qualified to represent France internationally and represented them at U-20 and U-21 level before making his international debut for the Democratic Republic of the Congo in March 2008.)
22	MF	HUN	Zoltán Gera
23	DF	NIR	Gareth McAuley
25	DF	ENG	Craig Dawson
28	DF	ENG	Billy Jones
29	MF	BEN	Stéphane Sessègnon
33	DF	IRL	Bradley Garmston (Note: Garmston was born in Chorley, England, but also qualified to represent the Republic of Ireland internationally and represented them at U-17, U-19 and U-21 level.)
34	FW	ENG	Kemar Roofe
36	MF	ENG	Adil Nabi
37	MF	ENG	Mani O'Sullivan
38	FW	ENG	Saido Berahino (Note: Berahino was born in Bujumbura, Burundi, but was raised in England from the age of 10 and represented them at every youth level between U-16 and U-21 level before making his international debut for Burundi in September 2018.)
40	DF	ENG	Liam O'Neil
41	DF	ENG	Cameron Gayle
42	DF	MSR	Donervon Daniels
44	DF	ENG	Callam Jones
50	FW	FRA	Thievy Bifouma (Note: Bifouma was born in Saint-Denis, France, and represented them at U-20 and U-21 level, but also qualified to represent the Congo internationally and would make his international debut for the Congo in August 2014.) (on loan from Espanyol)

=== Left club during season ===
Note: Flags indicate national team as defined under FIFA eligibility rules; some limited exceptions apply. Players may hold more than one non-FIFA nationality.

No.	Pos.	Nation	Player
8	FW	SWE	Markus Rosenberg (to Malmö FF)
9	FW	IRL	Shane Long (to Hull City)
12	GK	NIR	Lee Camp (Note: Camp was born in Derby, England, and represented them at U-21 level, but also qualified to represent Northern Ireland internationally through his grandfather and made his international debut for Northern Ireland in March 2011.) (to Bournemouth)
15	MF	ENG	George Thorne (on loan to Derby County)

No.	Pos.	Nation	Player
24	FW	NGR	Peter Odemwingie (Note: Odemwingie was born in Tashkent, Uzbek SRR, Soviet Union (now Uzbekistan), but also qualified to represent Nigeria internationally through his father and made his international debut for Nigeria in May 2002.) (to Cardiff City)
30	DF	ROU	Gabriel Tamaș (to CFR Cluj)
39	FW	FRA	Nicolas Anelka (sacked)

== Player statistics ==
Numbers in parentheses denote appearances as substitute.
Players with no appearances not included in the list.

As of 11 May 2014

No.	Pos.	Nat.	Name	Premier League		FA Cup		League Cup		Total		Discipline	
No.	Pos.	Nat.	Name	Apps	Goals	Apps	Goals	Apps	Goals	Apps	Goals	Yellow card	Red card
1	GK	ENG	Ben Foster	24	0	1	0	0	0	25	0	1	0
2	DF	IRL	Steven Reid	16	0	0	0	1	0	17	0	4*	0
3	DF	SWE	Jonas Olsson	32	1	0	0	0	0	32	1	10	0
4	DF	MKD	Goran Popov	1 (1)	0	1	0	2	0	4 (1)	0	1*	0
5	MF	ARG	Claudio Yacob	22 (5)	1	1	0	1	0	24 (5)	1	8*	0
6	DF	ENG	Liam Ridgewell	33	1	0	0	0	0	33	1	6	0
7	MF	SCO	James Morrison	23 (9)	1	1	0	0 (2)	0	24 (11)	1	1	0
8	FW	SWE	Markus Rosenberg	1 (3)	0	0	0	0 (2)	0	1 (5)	0	0	0
9	FW	IRL	Shane Long	11 (4)	3	1	0	1	0	13 (4)	3	2	0
10	MF	ENG	Scott Sinclair	4 (4)	0	0 (1)	0	2	0	6 (5)	0	0	0
11	MF	NIR	Chris Brunt	25 (3)	3	0	0	1	0	26 (3)	3	7	0
13	GK	WAL	Boaz Myhill	14	0	0	0	0	0	14	0	0	0
14	DF	URU	Diego Lugano	7 (2)	1	1	0	2	0	10 (2)	1	4*+	0
16	FW	NGA	Victor Anichebe	11 (13)	3	0	0	0	0	11 (13)	3	3	0
17	MF	SCO	Graham Dorrans	12 (2)	2	0	0	2	0	14 (2)	2	4	0
18	MF	FRA	Morgan Amalfitano	26 (2)	4	0 (1)	0	0 (1)	0	26 (4)	4	4+	0
19	GK	ENG	Luke Daniels	0 (1)	0	0	0	2	0	2 (1)	0	0	0
20	FW	CZE	Matěj Vydra	7 (16)	3	1	0	1	0	9 (16)	3	0	0
21	MF	COD	Youssouf Mulumbu	33 (4)	2	0	0	1	0	34 (4)	2	7	0
22	MF	HUN	Zoltán Gera	5 (9)	0	1	0	0	0	6 (9)	0	2+	0
23	DF	NIR	Gareth McAuley	32	2	1	0	0	0	33	2	4	0
25	DF	ENG	Craig Dawson	10 (2)	0	1	0	2	0	13 (2)	0	2+	0
28	DF	ENG	Billy Jones	21	0	0	0	1	0	22	0	5	0
29	MF	BEN	Stéphane Sessègnon	23 (3)	5	0 (1)	0	1	0	24 (4)	5	0	0
38	FW	ENG	Saido Berahino	11 (21)	5	1	0	2	4	14 (21)	9	0	0
39	FW	FRA	Nicolas Anelka	11 (1)	2	0	0	0	0	11 (1)	2	0	0
40	DF	ENG	Liam O'Neil	0 (3)	0	0	0	0	0	0 (3)	0	0	0
41	DF	ENG	Cameron Gayle	0	0	0	0	0 (1)	0	0 (1)	0	0	0
50	FW	CGO	Thievy Bifouma	3 (3)	2	0	0	0	0	3 (3)	2	0	0

* – One booking in League Cup
+ – One booking in FA Cup

== Results ==
=== Pre-season ===
During pre-season, Albion installed the Hawk-Eye system at their home ground, The Hawthorns, in order to enable the newly introduced goal-line technology for the 2013–14 season.

18 July 2013	(Germany) Hannover 96	2–1	West Bromwich Albion	Gleisdorf
18:00	Diouf 28'; Dawson 80' (o.g.)	Report	Rosenberg 42'	Stadium: Solarstadion der Stadt; Attendance: 500; Referee: Julia Baier

22 July 2013	(Hungary) Ferenc Puskás Football Academy	0–3	West Bromwich Albion	Felcsút
17:00			Anelka 9', 27'; Dorrans 81' (pen.)	Stadium: Felcsúti Sporkomplexum; Referee: Adam Farkas

27 July 2013	Derby County	0–2	West Bromwich Albion	Derby
15:00		Report	Dorrans 39'; Rosenberg 90'	Stadium: Pride Park Stadium; Attendance: 7,663; Referee: Chris Sarginson

29 July 2013	West Bromwich Albion	3–1	(Greece) Atromitos	Shrewsbury
19.30	Anelka 55'; Berahino 75'; Rosenberg 87'	Report	T. Karagounis 12'	Stadium: New Meadow; Referee: Stuart Attwell

1 August 2013	West Bromwich Albion	0–1	(Italy) Genoa	Telford
		Report	Lodi 70'; Antonelli (yellow card) 64'	Stadium: New Bucks Head; Attendance: 912; Referee: Robert Madley

6 August 2013	(Republic of Ireland) Cork City	0–6	West Bromwich Albion	Cork
		Report	Anelka 25', 47', 63'; Dorrans 44', 73'; Long 48'	Stadium: Turners Cross; Attendance: 2,371; Referee: Anthony Buttimer

10 August 2013	West Bromwich Albion	2–0	(Italy) Bologna	West Bromwich
	Rosenberg 32'; Anelka 35'	Report		Stadium: The Hawthorns; Attendance: 5649; Referee: Anthony Taylor

=== Overall ===
Competition	Started round	Final position / round	First match	Last match
Premier League	—	17th	17 August 2013	11 May 2014
League Cup	2nd round	3rd round	27 August 2013	25 September 2013
FA Cup	3rd round	3rd round	4 January 2014	4 January 2014

Source: Competitions

=== Premier League ===
Albion participated in the 2013–14 Premier League.

==== League table ====
Pos	Team	Pld	W	D	L	GF	GA	GD	Pts	Qualification or relegation
15	Aston Villa	38	10	8	20	39	61	−22	38	
16	Hull City	38	10	7	21	38	53	−15	37	Qualification for the Europa League third qualifying round (Note: Hull City qualified for the Europa League third qualifying round as runners-up of the 2013–14 FA Cup since winners Arsenal qualified for Champions League.)
17	West Bromwich Albion	38	7	15	16	43	59	−16	36	
18	Norwich City (R)	38	8	9	21	28	62	−34	33	Relegation to Football League Championship
19	Fulham (R)	38	9	5	24	40	85	−45	32	Relegation to Football League Championship

Source: Barclays Premier League
Rules for classification: 1) Points; 2) Goal difference; 3) Goals scored; 4) Play-offs (only if needed to decide champion, teams for relegation or teams for UEFA competitions).
(R) Relegated

==== Results summary ====
Overall								Home						Away					
Pld	W	D	L	GF	GA	GD	Pts	W	D	L	GF	GA	GD	W	D	L	GF	GA	GD
38	7	15	16	43	59	−16	36	4	9	6	24	27	−3	3	6	10	19	32	−13

Last updated: 11 May 2014.
Source: Premier League

==== Results by matchday ====
Matchday	1	2	3	4	5	6	7	8	9	10	11	12	13	14	15	16	17	18	19	20	21	22	23	24	25	26	27	28	29	30	31	32	33	34	35	36	37	38
Ground	H	A	H	A	H	A	H	A	A	H	A	H	A	H	H	A	H	A	A	H	A	H	A	H	A	H	H	H	A	A	H	A	H	A	H	A	A	H
Result	L	D	L	D	W	W	D	D	L	W	D	D	L	L	L	L	D	D	D	W	L	D	L	D	L	D	D	L	W	L	D	W	D	L	W	L	L	L
Position	15	16	20	19	13	10	12	13	12	11	9	11	12	13	15	16	16	15	15	14	14	13	15	16	18	17	17	17	16	16	17	16	16	16	15	16	17	17

Source: Statto.com
A = Away; H = Home; W = Win; D = Draw; L = Loss

==== Matches ====
17 August 2013 1	West Bromwich Albion	0–1	Southampton	West Bromwich
15:00		Report	Lambert 90' (pen.)	Stadium: The Hawthorns; Attendance: 25,927 (2,600 away); Referee: Kevin Friend

24 August 2013 2	Everton	0–0	West Bromwich Albion	Liverpool
15:00 BST	Barkley (yellow card) 85'	Report	Mulumbu (yellow card) 28'	Stadium: Goodison Park; Attendance: 36,410; Referee: Roger East

1 September 2013 3	West Bromwich Albion	0–2	Swansea City	West Bromwich
13:30 BST	McAuley (yellow card) 29'; Yacob (yellow card) 38'; Dorrans (yellow card) 54'; Olsson (yellow card) 65'	Report	Davies 22'; Michu (yellow card) 61'; Rangel (yellow card) 70'; Pozuelo (yellow card) 76'; Hernández 83'	Stadium: The Hawthorns; Attendance: 23,395 (1,698 away); Referee: Mike Dean

14 September 2013 4	Fulham	1–1	West Bromwich Albion	London
15:00 BST	Sidwell 22'	Report	Jones (yellow card) 70'; McAuley 90+2'	Stadium: Craven Cottage; Attendance: 25,560 (1,583 away); Referee: Lee Probert

21 September 2013 5	West Bromwich Albion	3–0	Sunderland	West Bromwich
15:00 BST	Sessègnon 20'; Ridgewell 76'; Amalfitano 90+3'	Report	Colback (yellow card) 28'; Ki (yellow card) 35'	Stadium: The Hawthorns; Attendance: 24,595 (2,600 away); Referee: Phil Dowd

28 September 2013 6	Manchester United	1–2	West Bromwich Albion	Manchester
15:00 BST	Carrick (yellow card) 15'; Rooney 57'; Jones (yellow card) 65'; Büttner (yellow card) 73'	Report	Amalfitano 54', (yellow card) 86'; Berahino 67'	Stadium: Old Trafford; Attendance: 75,042 (1,502 away); Referee: Michael Oliver

6 October 2013 7	West Bromwich Albion	1–1	Arsenal	West Bromwich
16:00 BST	Yacob 42'; Olsson (yellow card) 54'	Report	Flamini (yellow card) 23'; Wilshere (yellow card) 45+2', (goal) 63'	Stadium: The Hawthorns; Attendance: 24,839 (2,597 away); Referee: Lee Mason

19 October 2013 8	Stoke City	0–0	West Bromwich Albion	Stoke-on-Trent
15:00 BST	Wilkinson (yellow card) 73'	Report		Stadium: Britannia Stadium; Attendance: 25,904 (2,892 away); Referee: Howard Webb

26 October 2013 9	Liverpool	4–1	West Bromwich Albion	Liverpool
15:00 BST	Suárez 12', 17', 55'; Sturridge 77'	Report	Morrison 66' (pen.); Yacob (yellow card) 54'; Olsson (yellow card) 72'	Stadium: Anfield; Attendance: 44,747 (1,000 away); Referee: Jonathan Moss

2 November 2013 10	West Bromwich Albion	2–0	Crystal Palace	West Bromwich
15:00 GMT	Berahino 44'; McAuley 83'	Report	Thomas (yellow card) 71'	Stadium: The Hawthorns; Attendance: 26,397 (2,586 away); Referee: Neil Swarbrick

9 November 2013 11	Chelsea	2–2	West Bromwich Albion	London
15:00 GMT	Lampard (yellow card) 15'; Eto'o 45', (yellow card) 45'; Hazard 90+5' (pen.); Ivanović (yellow card) 90+7'	Report	Yacob (yellow card) 28'; Long (yellow card) 45+3', (goal) 60'; Sessègnon 68'; Amalfitano (yellow card) 83'; Brunt (yellow card) 90+5'; McAuley (yellow card) 90+5'; Ridgewell (yellow card) 90+5'; Olsson (yellow card) 90+7'	Stadium: Stamford Bridge; Attendance: 41,623 (1,500 away); Referee: Andre Marriner

25 November 2013 12	West Bromwich Albion	2–2	Aston Villa	West Bromwich
20:00 GMT	Long 3', 11'; Mulumbu (yellow card) 53'	Report	El Ahmadi 67'; Westwood 76'; Clark (yellow card) 86'; Agbonlahor (yellow card) 90+3'	Stadium: The Hawthorns; Attendance: 24,902 (2,595 away); Referee: Michael Oliver

30 November 2013 13	Newcastle United	2–1	West Bromwich Albion	Newcastle upon Tyne
17:30 GMT	Sissoko (yellow card) 32', (goal) 57'; Gouffran 36'	Report	Brunt (yellow card) 28', (goal) 53'; Mulumbu (yellow card) 89'	Stadium: St. James' Park; Attendance: 49,298 (1,888 away); Referee: Phil Dowd

4 December 2013 14	West Bromwich Albion	2–3	Manchester City	West Bromwich
19:45 GMT	Pantilimon 85' (o.g.); Olsson (yellow card) 87'; Anichebe 90'	Report	Agüero 9'; Touré 24', 74' (pen.); Pantilimon (yellow card) 84'	Stadium: The Hawthorns; Attendance: 22,943 (2,600 away); Referee: Chris Foy

7 December 2013 15	West Bromwich Albion	0–2	Norwich City	West Bromwich
15:00 GMT	Brunt (yellow card) 27'	Report	Hooper 13'; Whittaker (yellow card) 53'; Ruddy (yellow card) 74'; Murphy (yellow card) 78'; Fer 89'	Stadium: The Hawthorns; Attendance: 23,675 (2,594 away); Referee: Mark Clattenburg

14 December 2013 16	Cardiff City	1–0	West Bromwich Albion	Cardiff
15:00 GMT	Medel (yellow card) 36'; Mutch (yellow card) 63'; Whittingham 65'	Report	Jones (yellow card) 51'	Stadium: Cardiff City Stadium; Attendance: 26,632 (1,800 away); Referee: Howard Webb

21 December 2013 17	West Bromwich Albion	1–1	Hull City	West Bromwich
15:00 GMT	Jones (yellow card) 65'; Vydra 86'; Gera (yellow card) 88'	Report	Livermore 28'; Meyler (yellow card) 40'	Stadium: The Hawthorns; Attendance: 24,753 (1,744 away); Referee: Jonathan Moss

26 December 2013 18	Tottenham Hotspur	1–1	West Bromwich Albion	London
15:00 GMT	Eriksen 36', (yellow card) 37'; Walker (yellow card) 56'; Soldado (yellow card) 87'	report	Reid (yellow card) 30'; Olsson 38', (yellow card) 67'	Stadium: White Hart Lane; Attendance: 35,545 (1,212 away); Referee: Anthony Taylor

28 December 2013 19	West Ham United	3–3	West Bromwich Albion	London
12:45 UTC	J. Cole 4'; C. Cole (yellow card) 43'; Nolan (yellow card) 57', (goal) 67'; Maïga 65'; Diamé (yellow card) 81'	Report	Anelka 40', 45'; Mulumbu (yellow card) 48'; Berahino 69'; Ridgewell (yellow card) 90'	Stadium: Boleyn Ground; Attendance: 34,946 (1,840 away); Referee: Mike Dean

1 January 2014 20	West Bromwich Albion	1–0	Newcastle United	West Bromwich
15:00 GMT	Berahino 87' (pen.)	Report	Debuchy (red card)	Stadium: The Hawthorns; Attendance: 26,430 (2,600 away); Referee: Lee Mason

11 January 2014 21	Southampton	1–0	West Bromwich Albion	Southampton
15:00 GMT	Lovren (yellow card) 27'; Lallana 66'	Report	Long (yellow card) 58'; Olsson (yellow card) 72'	Stadium: St Mary's Stadium; Attendance: 28,610 (1,373 away); Referee: Howard Webb

20 January 2014 22	West Bromwich Albion	1–1	Everton	West Bromwich
20:00 GMT	Yacob (yellow card) 35'; Morrison (yellow card) 44'; Ridgewell (yellow card) 55'; Lugano 75'	Report	Mirallas 41', (yellow card) 90+2'; Barry (yellow card) 51'	Stadium: The Hawthorns; Attendance: 24,184 (2,600 away); Referee: Michael Oliver

29 January 2014 23	Aston Villa	4–3	West Bromwich Albion	Birmingham
19:45 GMT	Weimann 12'; Bacuna 24'; Delph 37'; Benteke 64' (pen.); Holt (yellow card) 89'	Report	Brunt 4', (yellow card) 70'; Delph 9' (o.g.); Mulumbu 43'; Lugano (yellow card) 68'; Olsson (yellow card) 87'	Stadium: Villa Park; Attendance: 36,083 (2,900 away); Referee: Mark Clattenburg

2 February 2014 24	West Bromwich Albion	1–1	Liverpool	West Bromwich
13:30 GMT	Anichebe 67'; Yacob (yellow card) 14'; Ridgewell (yellow card) 62'; Mulumbu (yellow card) 82'; Lugano (yellow card) 86'	Report	Sturridge 24'; Suárez (yellow card) 74'; Gerrard (yellow card) 81'	Stadium: The Hawthorns; Attendance: 26,132 (2,600 away); Referee: Kevin Friend

8 February 2014 25	Crystal Palace	3–1	West Bromwich Albion	London
15:00 GMT	Ince 15'; Ledley 27'; Chamakh 69' (pen.)	Report	Jones (yellow card) 39'; Thievy 46'; Yacob (yellow card) 65'; Brunt (yellow card) 79'	Stadium: Selhurst Park; Attendance: 24,501 (1,863 away); Referee: Chris Foy

11 February 2014 26	West Bromwich Albion	1–1	Chelsea	West Bromwich
20:00 GMT	Amalfitano (yellow card) 41'; Yacob (yellow card) 50'; Anichebe 87', (yellow card) 88'	Report	Ivanović 45+3', (yellow card) 76'; Willian (yellow card) 67'; David Luiz (yellow card) 81'; Matić (yellow card) 89'	Stadium: The Hawthorns; Attendance: 24,327 (2,600 away); Referee: Anthony Taylor

22 February 2014 27	West Bromwich Albion	1–1	Fulham	West Bromwich
15:00 GMT	Brunt (yellow card) 45+1'; McAuley (yellow card) 75'; Vydra 86'; Olsson (yellow card) 90+1'	Report	Dejagah 28'; Heitinga (yellow card) 45+3'; Riether (yellow card) 72'; Parker (yellow card) 86'	Stadium: The Hawthorns; Attendance: 25,782 (2,072 away); Referee: Mike Dean

8 March 2014 28	West Bromwich Albion	0–3	Manchester United	West Bromwich
12:45 GMT	Anichebe (yellow card) 90'	Report	Januzaj (yellow card) 13'; Jones 34'; Van Persie (yellow card) 50'; Rooney 65'; Welbeck 82'	Stadium: The Hawthorns; Attendance: 26,184 (2,600 away); Referee: Jon Moss

15 March 2014 29	Swansea City	1–2	West Bromwich Albion	Swansea
15:00 GMT	Lamah 2'; Routledge (yellow card) 28'	Report	Anichebe (yellow card) 25'; Reid (yellow card) 31'; Olsson (yellow card) 52'; Sessègnon 52'; Mulumbu 85'	Stadium: Liberty Stadium; Attendance: 20,703 (2,100 away); Referee: Martin Atkinson

22 March 2014 30	Hull City	2–0	West Bromwich Albion	Kingston upon Hull
15:00 GMT	Rosenior 31'; Long 38'; Aluko (yellow card) 58'; Meyler (yellow card) 72'	Report		Stadium: KC Stadium; Attendance: 23,486 (2,100 away); Referee: Chris Foy

29 March 2014 31	West Bromwich Albion	3–3	Cardiff City	West Bromwich
15:00 GMT	Amalfitano 2'; Dorrans 9', (yellow card) 64'; Thievy 90+4'	Report	Mutch 31'; Caulker 73'; Bellamy (yellow card) 78'; Dæhli 90+5'	Stadium: The Hawthorns; Attendance: 25,661 (2,600 away); Referee: Michael Oliver

5 April 2014 32	Norwich City	0–1	West Bromwich Albion	Norwich
15:00 BST	Tettey (yellow card) 44'	Report	Amalfitano 16'	Stadium: Carrow Road; Attendance: 26,859 (2,500 away); Referee: Mark Clattenburg

12 April 2014 33	West Bromwich Albion	3–3	Tottenham Hotspur	West Bromwich
15:07 BST^{1}	Vydra 1'; Brunt 4'; Sessègnon 31'; Dorrans (yellow card) 62'; Reid (yellow card) 64'; Ridgewell (yellow card) 84'; Foster (yellow card) 90+4'	Report	Olsson 34' (o.g.); Rose (yellow card) 55'; Kane 70'; Eriksen (yellow card) 90', (goal) 90+4'	Stadium: The Hawthorns; Attendance: 25,398 (2,591 away fans); Referee: Neil Swarbrick

21 April 2014 34	Manchester City	3–1	West Bromwich Albion	Manchester
20:00 BST	Zabaleta 3'; Agüero 10'; Demichelis (yellow card) 22' (goal) 36'	Report	Dorrans 16'; Dawson (yellow card) 19'	Stadium: Etihad Stadium; Attendance: 46,564 (492 away); Referee: Phil Dowd

26 April 2014 35	West Bromwich Albion	1–0	West Ham United	West Bromwich
15:00 BST	Berahino 11'	Report	Collins (yellow card) 90+2'	Stadium: The Hawthorns; Attendance: 26,541 (2,597 away); Referee: Mike Dean

4 May 2014 36	Arsenal	1–0	West Bromwich Albion	London
13:30 BST	Giroud 14', (yellow card) 90+1'; Monreal (yellow card) 64'	Report	Brunt (yellow card) 83'; Dorrans (yellow card) 90+1'	Stadium: Emirates Stadium; Attendance: 60,021 (3,000 away); Referee: Mike Jones

7 May 2014 37	Sunderland	2–0	West Bromwich Albion	Sunderland
19:45 BST	Colback 13'; Borini 31'	Report		Stadium: Stadium of Light; Attendance: 45,181 (966 away); Referee: Lee Mason

11 May 2014 38	West Bromwich Albion	1–2	Stoke City	West Bromwich
15:00 BST	Sessègnon 56'	Report	McAuley 22' (o.g.); Adam 87'	Stadium: The Hawthorns; Attendance: 26,613 (2,600 away); Referee: Lee Probert

1. All matches on 11–14 April kicked off 7 minutes after the originally scheduled time, to mark the 25th anniversary of the Hillsborough disaster.

=== FA Cup ===
4 January 2014 Third round	West Bromwich Albion	0–2	Crystal Palace	West Bromwich
15:00 GMT	Gera (yellow card) 27'; Dawson (yellow card) 55'; Lugano (yellow card) 56'; Amalfitano (yellow card) 90+3'	Report	Gayle 23'; Boateng (yellow card) 42'; Parr (yellow card) 61'; Mariappa (yellow card) 73'; Chamakh 90+5'	Stadium: The Hawthorns; Attendance: 12,700 (1,238 away); Referee: Phil Dowd

=== League Cup ===
Albion participated in the 2013–14 Football League Cup. At half-time in their home tie against Arsenal, the club were presented with a blue plaque as one of the 12 founder members of the Football League, which was celebrating its 125th anniversary. The plaque was later displayed on the outside of the East Stand at The Hawthorns.

27 August 2013 Second round	West Bromwich Albion	3–0	Newport County	West Bromwich
20:00 BST	Berahino 7', 26', 38' (pen.); Yacob (yellow card) 30'	Report		Stadium: The Hawthorns; Attendance: 8,955 (1,715 away); Referee: Andy D'Urso

25 September 2013 Third round	West Bromwich Albion	1–1 (a.e.t.) (3–4 p)	Arsenal	West Bromwich
20:00 BST	Berahino 71'; Lugano (yellow card) 89'; Popov (yellow card) 90'; Reid (yellow card) 99'	Report	Hayden (yellow card) 34'; Monreal (yellow card) 36'; Vermaelen (yellow card) 52'; Eisfeld 61'; Arteta (yellow card) 85'	Stadium: The Hawthorns; Attendance: 18,649 (5,144 away); Referee: Robert Madley
	Penalties
	Reid (penalty scored); Rosenberg (penalty scored); Morrison (penalty scored); Dawson (penalty missed); Amalfitano (penalty missed)		(penalty scored) Bendtner; (penalty missed) Gnabry; (penalty scored) Olsson; (penalty scored) Akpom; (penalty scored) Monreal

== Transfers ==
=== In ===
Date	Pos.	Name	From	Fee	Ref
4 July 2013	FW	Nicolas Anelka (FRA)	(Juventus)	Free	
2 August 2013	DF	Diego Lugano (URU)	Paris Saint-Germain	Free	
14 August 2013	MF	Zoltán Gera (HUN)^{1}		Free	
2 September 2013	GK	Lee Camp (NIR)		Free	
2 September 2013	MF	Stéphane Sessègnon (BEN)	Sunderland	£6,500,000+	
2 September 2013	FW	Victor Anichebe (NGR)	Everton	£6,000,000	

† Brackets around club names denote the player's contract with that club had expired before he joined West Brom.

=== Loans in ===
Date from	Pos.	Name	From	Date until	Ref
10 July 2013	DF	Goran Popov (MKD)	Dynamo Kyiv	End of season	
13 August 2013	FW	Matěj Vydra (CZE)	Udinese	End of season	
22 August 2013	MF	Scott Sinclair (ENG)	Manchester City	End of season	
2 September 2013	MF	Morgan Amalfitano (FRA)	Marseille	End of season	
31 January 2014	FW	Thievy Bifouma (CGO)	Espanyol	End of season	

=== Out ===
Date	Pos.	Name	To	Fee	Ref
30 June 2013	DF	Gonzalo Jara (CHI)	(Nottingham Forest)	Released	
30 June 2013	MF	Jerome Thomas (ENG)	(Crystal Palace)	Released	
30 June 2013	MF	Zoltán Gera (HUN)^{1}		Released	
5 July 2013	FW	Marc-Antoine Fortuné (FRA)	Wigan Athletic	Free	
5 July 2013	FW	Peter Odemwingie (NGR)	Cardiff City	£2,250,000	
2 September 2013	DF	Gabriel Tamaș (ROM)	(CFR Cluj)	Contract terminated	
1 January 2014	GK	Lee Camp (NIR)	(AFC Bournemouth)	Contract expired	
17 January 2014	FW	Shane Long (IRL)	Hull City	Undisclosed	
2 February 2014	FW	Markus Rosenberg (SWE)	(Malmö FF)	Contract terminated	
14 March 2014	FW	Nicolas Anelka (FRA)		Sacked	

† Brackets around club names denote the player joined that club after his West Brom contract expired.

=== Loans out ===
Date from	Pos.	Name	To	Date until	Ref
19 July 2013	MF	Scott Allan (SCO)	Birmingham City	End of season	
31 October 2013	GK	Lee Camp (NIR)	AFC Bournemouth	1 January 2014	
6 November 2013	MF	George Thorne (ENG)	Watford	2 January 2014	
28 November 2013	DF	Cameron Gayle (ENG)	Shrewsbury Town	4 January 2014	
30 January 2014	MF	George Thorne (ENG)	Derby County	End of season	

Notes

1. Zoltán Gera was re-signed by West Bromwich Albion before the start of the 2013–14 season.
