= Kayleden Brown =

English-born Welsh footballer

Personal information
- Full name: Kayleden Courtney Brown
- Date of birth: 15 April 1992 (age 34)
- Place of birth: Birmingham, England
- Height: 6 ft 2 in (1.88 m)
- Position: Striker

Senior career*
Years	Team	Apps	(Gls)
2009–2013	West Bromwich Albion	0	(0)
2010	→ Barrow (loan)	2	(0)
2010	→ Keflavík (loan)		
2010	→ Tranmere Rovers (loan)	4	(0)
2010–2011	→ Dagenham & Redbridge (loan)	3	(0)
2011	→ Port Vale (loan)	4	(0)
2013	Market Drayton Town	3	(1)
2013–2017	Stourbridge		

International career
2008–2009	Wales U17	9	(1)
2008–2011	Wales U19	10	(5)
- * Club domestic league appearances and goals

Kayleden Courtney Brown (born 15 April 1992) is an English-born Welsh former footballer who played as a striker.

A Wales under-19 international, whilst a West Bromwich Albion squad player he played on loan at Barrow, Keflavík, Tranmere Rovers, Dagenham & Redbridge, and Port Vale. He was released by West Brom in 2013 after struggling with a serious knee injury. He went on to play for Market Drayton Town and then Stourbridge later that year.

== Club career ==
=== West Bromwich Albion ===
After regularly appearing for the Baggies' reserve team, he went out on loan to Barrow in January 2010. He made two substitute appearances in the Conference National before returning to The Hawthorns. He then joined Icelandic top flight side Keflavík on a month-long loan at the start of the 2010 Úrvalsdeild season, along with fellow West Bromwich Albion player Lateef Elford-Alliyu.

He joined League One side Tranmere Rovers on loan at the beginning of the 2010–11 season; Tranmere manager Les Parry said that "Kayleden is a good young prospect who I've seen play a lot for West Brom's reserve side. He's strong, athletic and has a good scoring record." He made his Football League debut on 14 August in a goalless draw with Huddersfield Town at the Galpharm Stadium. He started his first Football League game away to Dagenham & Redbridge on 28 August. On 9 November, he joined Dagenham & Redbridge on a one-month loan, making his debut for the club on 20 November in a league match against Oldham Athletic. The deal was later extended by a further month and ended on 9 January. On 21 January 2011 he joined Jim Gannon's Port Vale on a one-month loan, along with Romaine Sawyers. The pair returned to The Hawthorns after the loan spell ended, with Brown having made four substitute appearances at Vale Park. At the end of the 2012–13 season he was released by West Bromwich Albion due to a serious knee injury.

=== Non-League ===
Brown started the 2013–14 season with Northern Premier League side Market Drayton Town. He soon moved on to Southern League club Stourbridge, making his debut in mid-October after his injury kept him sidelined for a few weeks. Gary Hackett's "Glassboys" finished in fifth place in 2013–14, securing a play-off spot before losing to Chesham United at the semi-final stage. They were then switched to the Northern Premier League Premier Division, finishing in 16th place in 2014–15 and sixth place in 2015–16. Stourbridge finished third in the 2016–17 campaign and went on to be beaten 1–0 by Spennymoor Town in the play-off final.

== International career ==
Brown has received call-ups for the Wales youth squads at both U17 and U19 levels. He received his first international call-up for an under-17 friendly tournament in July 2008. For the under-19 side, he scored a hat-trick past Andorra in a 6–0 win on 15 November 2008. He also scored in games against both FYR Macedonia and Liechtenstein.

== Career statistics ==
Appearances and goals by club, season and competition
Club	Season	League			FA Cup		League Cup		Other		Total	
Club	Season	Division	Apps	Goals	Apps	Goals	Apps	Goals	Apps	Goals	Apps	Goals
West Bromwich Albion	2009–10	Championship	0	0	0	0	0	0	—		0	0
West Bromwich Albion	2010–11	Premier League	0	0	0	0	0	0	0	0	0	0
West Bromwich Albion	2011–12	Premier League	0	0	0	0	0	0	0	0	0	0
West Bromwich Albion	2012–13	Premier League	0	0	0	0	0	0	0	0	0	0
West Bromwich Albion	Total		0	0	0	0	0	0	0	0	0	0
Barrow (loan)	2009–10	Conference National	2	0	0	0	—		0	0	2	0
Tranmere Rovers (loan)	2010–11	League One	4	0	0	0	0	0	1 (Note: Appearance(s) in the EFL Trophy.)	0	5	0
Dagenham & Redbridge (loan)	2010–11	League One	3	0	0	0	—		—		3	0
Port Vale (loan)	2010–11	League Two	4	0	—		—		—		4	0
Market Drayton Town	2013–14	Northern Premier League; Division One South	3	1	0	0	—		0	0	3	1
Stourbridge	2016–17	Northern Premier League; Premier Division	25	3	8	0	—		3 (Note: 1 appearance in the Worcestershire Senior Cup, 1 appearance in the FA Trophy, and 1 appearance in the play-offs.)	0	36	3
