= Graham Dorrans =

Scottish footballer (born 1987)

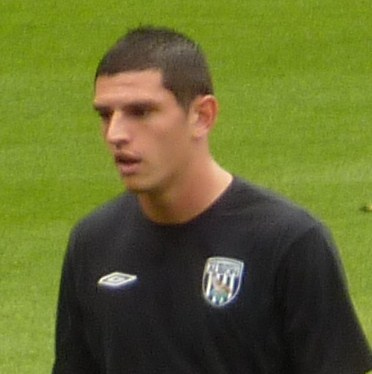
- Dorrans (West Brom) in 2009

Personal information
- Full name: Graham Dorrans
- Date of birth: 5 May 1987 (age 39)
- Place of birth: Glasgow, Scotland
- Height: 5 ft 10 in (1.79 m)
- Position: Midfielder

Team information
- Current team: Johnstone Burgh

Youth career
- Rangers SABC
- 2000–2005: Livingston

Senior career*
Years	Team	Apps	(Gls)
2005–2008	Livingston	77	(16)
2005	→ Partick Thistle (loan)	15	(5)
2008–2015	West Bromwich Albion	166	(21)
2015	→ Norwich City (loan)	15	(3)
2015–2017	Norwich City	44	(6)
2017–2019	Rangers	17	(5)
2019–2020	Dundee	25	(1)
2020–2021	Western Sydney Wanderers	23	(4)
2021–2022	Dunfermline Athletic	19	(1)
2023–2025	Johnstone Burgh	36	(3)

International career^{‡}
2007	Scotland U20	5	(0)
2008	Scotland U21	5	(0)
2009–2015	Scotland	12	(0)
- * Club domestic league appearances and goals as of 23:14, 22 Feb 2025 (UTC) ‡ National team caps and goals as of 11 October 2015

Graham Dorrans (born 5 May 1987) is a Scottish professional footballer who plays as a midfielder for Johnstone Burgh.

He began his football career at Scottish club Livingston, before joining English club West Bromwich Albion in 2008. In the 2009–10 season, he helped West Bromwich Albion gain promotion to the Premier League and was named in the Championship Team of the Year in the process. He signed for Norwich City in 2015, and then moved to Rangers in 2017. After a couple of years there mired by injury issues, he regained his fitness with Dundee before moving to Western Sydney Wanderers in 2020. Dorrans returned to Scotland the following year, signing with Dunfermline Athletic.

Dorrans has represented Scotland at under-20, under-21, and senior levels. He was a member of the Scotland squad at the 2007 FIFA U-20 World Cup. He made his full international debut for Scotland in October 2009, and has made 12 international appearances in total.

== Club career ==
=== Livingston ===
Dorrans came from the Barlanark area of Glasgow and spent a period of his youth training with Scottish Premier League club Rangers. He began his career at Livingston, emerging through the ranks alongside future international teammate Robert Snodgrass. He spent the first half of the 2005–06 season on loan at Partick Thistle. He made 15 league appearances, scoring five goals for the Glasgow side. Dorrans won the Scottish First Division Player's Player of the Year award at the end of the 2007–08 season.

=== West Bromwich Albion ===
After some good performances for Livingston during the 2007–08 season, Dorrans was approached by West Bromwich Albion manager Tony Mowbray. In January 2008, Dorrans agreed to join West Brom at the end of the season for £200,000. At the end of the 2007–08 season, Dorrans won the Scottish First Division Players' Player of the Year award. In July his move to Albion was completed, but for an initial £100,000, which could possibly rise to £150,000 depending on appearances.

He made his debut in the English Premier League for West Bromwich Albion on 21 December 2008, coming on as a second-half substitute against Manchester City. He was involved in Albion's first goal and won praise from Tony Mowbray after the game. Towards the end of the 2008–09 season, Dorrans signed an extended contract with West Brom. On 15 May, West Brom confirmed that Dorrans would be out for the rest of the season with a broken metatarsal bone.

He scored his first goal for West Brom in a League Cup tie at Bury on 11 August 2009. The 2009–10 season saw Dorrans break into the West Brom team and his performances led to reported interest from several Premier League clubs. On 4 January 2010, Dorrans signed a new three-and-a-half-year deal at the Baggies. He scored a 30-yard free kick against Preston North End on 21 March. Dorrans was then named PFA fans' Championship player of the month for March 2010, following his impressive performances. Dorrans finished the season as the club's top goal scorer, scoring a career best 13 goals in 45 league appearances, helping West Brom re-gain promotion to the Premier League.

In The Guardian on 20 March 2010, he was described as, "Composed, creative, combative, and consistent, Dorrans is easily the best all-round midfielder seen at West Brom since Bryan Robson." In April 2010 West Brom rejected an offer of £4 million from West Ham United for Dorrans, and a further £5 million bid on 8 July 2010. On 19 July 2010, Dorrans signed a new four-year deal with West Brom.

The 2010-11 saw Dorrans score his first Premier League goal in a 3–3 draw against West Ham. He went on to make just 21 league appearances in the season. Dorrans featured more prominently in the 2011–12 season under Roy Hodgson in his first full season in charge of West Brom, making 31 league appearances and scoring 3 goals, including a long-range free kick in a 1–0 win over Queens Park Rangers in April 2012.

Dorrans was made available for transfer by West Brom in January 2013, after he was left out of a matchday squad. He had a "difficult start" to the 2013–14 season, during which he made 16 appearances. Despite this, he played more under new head coach Pepe Mel, leading to Dorrans signing a three-year contract with West Brom in July 2014.

=== Norwich City ===
In February 2015, Dorrans joined Norwich City on loan for a month, which was later extended until the end of the 2014–15 season. The move was made permanent on 27 May 2015, just a few days after Dorrans helped the side win promotion to the Premier League, via the Playoff Final.

=== Rangers ===
On 6 July 2017, Dorrans moved from Norwich City to Rangers on a three-year contract for an undisclosed fee, reported to be around £1.3 million. He made his league debut for Rangers on 6 August 2017 and scored both goals in a 2–1 win over Motherwell. Dorrans injured an ankle in a match against Kilmarnock on 25 October, and the injury subsequently required surgery. On 2 September 2019, Dorrans was released from Rangers after an injury-plagued stint with the club.

=== Dundee ===
Dorrans signed a one-year deal with Dundee on 20 September 2019. He made his first appearance the next day as a substitute against Morton, despite not yet having trained with his new teammates. He scored his first goal for Dundee on 27 December in the Dundee derby against Dundee United. Dorrans signed a new 18-month contract with the Dee on 22 January 2020, keeping him at the club until 2021. In November 2020, Dorrans enacted a clause in his new contract, allowing him to leave by mutual consent to join another team overseas.

=== Western Sydney Wanderers ===
On 9 November 2020 Dorrans signed a two-year contract with the Wanderers who play in the Australian A-League. He scored his first goal for the club with a 40-meter lob on Adam Federici who was playing high up the pitch as a sweeper keeper following a Macarthur FC corner. Dorrans scored his second goal in the next match with a penalty against Melbourne Victory.

In July 2021, Dorrans left Western Sydney Wanderers following one season in Australia.

=== Dunfermline Athletic ===
Following his release from Western Sydney Wanderers, Dorrans returned to Scotland in July 2021 to sign with Scottish Championship side Dunfermline Athletic on a two-year deal. Dorrans scored his first goal for the Pars in an away win against Queen of the South in January 2022. On 2 September, Dorrans left the club by mutual consent.

=== Johnstone Burgh ===
After nearly a full season away from playing, Dorrans signed for West of Scotland Football League First Division club Johnstone Burgh on 2 May 2023.

== International career ==
Dorrans represented Scotland at under-20 level and was selected for the 2007 U-20 World Cup in Canada. As of May 2009, he had been selected five times for the Scotland national under-21 football team. Dorrans was also selected for the Scotland national football B team in 2009, but withdrew due to injury.

On 7 September 2009, Dorrans was called up for the first time for the senior squad to play the Netherlands in a World Cup qualifier. On 10 October 2009, he made his full Scotland debut in a friendly against Japan.

Dorrans made his home debut for Scotland on 3 March 2010 in a 1–0 victory over the Czech Republic, earning the sponsor's Man of the Match award.

Dorrans was often not selected for Scotland squads under the management of Gordon Strachan because they agreed he would not be selected if he was unlikely to play. They reached this arrangement due to Dorrans suffering from personal problems, as his daughter, Logan died at birth and another of his daughters contracted meningitis. Dorrans was recalled to the squad in October 2015, when other midfielders were unavailable.

== Career statistics ==
=== Club ===
As of match played 2 March 2024

Appearances and goals by club, season and competition
Club	Season	League			National Cup		League Cup		Europe		Other		Total	
Club	Season	Division	Apps	Goals	Apps	Goals	Apps	Goals	Apps	Goals	Apps	Goals	Apps	Goals
Livingston	2004–05	Scottish Premier League	1	0	0	0	0	0	–		–		1	0
Livingston	2005–06	Scottish Premier League	8	0	2	0	0	0	–		–		10	0
Livingston	2006–07	Scottish First Division	34	5	2	2	2	1	–		1 (Note: Appearances in the Scottish Challenge Cup)	0	39	8
Livingston	2007–08	Scottish First Division	34	11	4	1	2	0	–		1	0	41	12
Livingston	Total		77	16	8	3	4	1	0	0	2	0	91	20
Partick Thistle (loan)	2005–06	Scottish Second Division	15	5	0	0	0	0	–		0	0	15	5
West Bromwich Albion	2008–09	Premier League	8	0	3	0	0	0	–		–		11	0
West Bromwich Albion	2009–10	Championship	45	13	4	3	3	2	–		–		52	18
West Bromwich Albion	2010–11	Premier League	21	1	1	0	3	0	–		–		25	1
West Bromwich Albion	2011–12	Premier League	31	3	2	0	2	0	–		–		35	3
West Bromwich Albion	2012–13	Premier League	26	1	1	0	1	0	–		–		28	1
West Bromwich Albion	2013–14	Premier League	14	2	0	0	2	0	–		–		16	2
West Bromwich Albion	2014–15	Premier League	21	1	1	0	0	0	–		–		22	1
West Bromwich Albion	Total		166	21	12	3	11	2	0	0	0	0	189	26
Norwich City (loan)	2014–15	Championship	15	3	0	0	0	0	–		3 (Note: Appearances in the Championship play-offs)	0	18	3
Norwich City	2015–16	Premier League	21	0	1	0	3	0	–		–		25	0
Norwich City	2016–17	Championship	23	6	0	0	1	0	–		–		24	6
Norwich City	Total		44	6	1	0	4	0	0	0	0	0	49	6
Rangers	2017–18	Scottish Premiership	16	5	1	0	3	0	0	0	—		20	5
Rangers	2018–19	Scottish Premiership	1	0	0	0	1	0	1 (Note: Appearances in UEFA Europa League)	0	–		3	0
Rangers	2019–20	Scottish Premiership	0	0	0	0	0	0	0	0	—		0	0
Rangers	Total		17	5	1	0	4	0	1	0	0	0	23	5
Dundee	2019–20	Scottish Championship	22	1	1	0	0	0	—		0	0	23	1
Dundee	2020–21	Scottish Championship	3	0	0	0	1	1	—		0	0	4	1
Dundee	Total		25	1	1	0	1	1	0	0	0	0	27	2
Western Sydney Wanderers	2020–21	A-League	23	4	0	0	–		–		–		23	4
Dunfermline Athletic	2021–22	Scottish Championship	19	1	1	0	1	0	–		2 (Note: Appearances in the Scottish Championship play-offs)	0	23	1
Johnstone Burgh	2023–24	West of Scotland First Division	11	1	–		–		–		9 (Note: Appearance(s) in Scottish Junior Cup and SFA South Challenge Cup)	1	20	2
Career total			411	63	24	6	24	4	1	0	16	1	474	74

=== International ===
As of 12:17, 16 April 2019 (UTC)

Appearances and goals by national team and year
National team	Year	Apps	Goals
Scotland	2009	2	0
Scotland	2010	3	0
Scotland	2011	2	0
Scotland	2012	1	0
Scotland	2013	2	0
Scotland	2014	0	0
Scotland	2015	2	0
Total		12	0

== Honours ==
Norwich City

- Football League Championship play-offs: 2015

Individual

- PFA Fans' Player of the Year: 2009–10 Championship
- PFA Team of the Year: 2009–10 Championship
