= 2012–13 West Bromwich Albion F.C. season =

West Bromwich Albion
2012–13 season
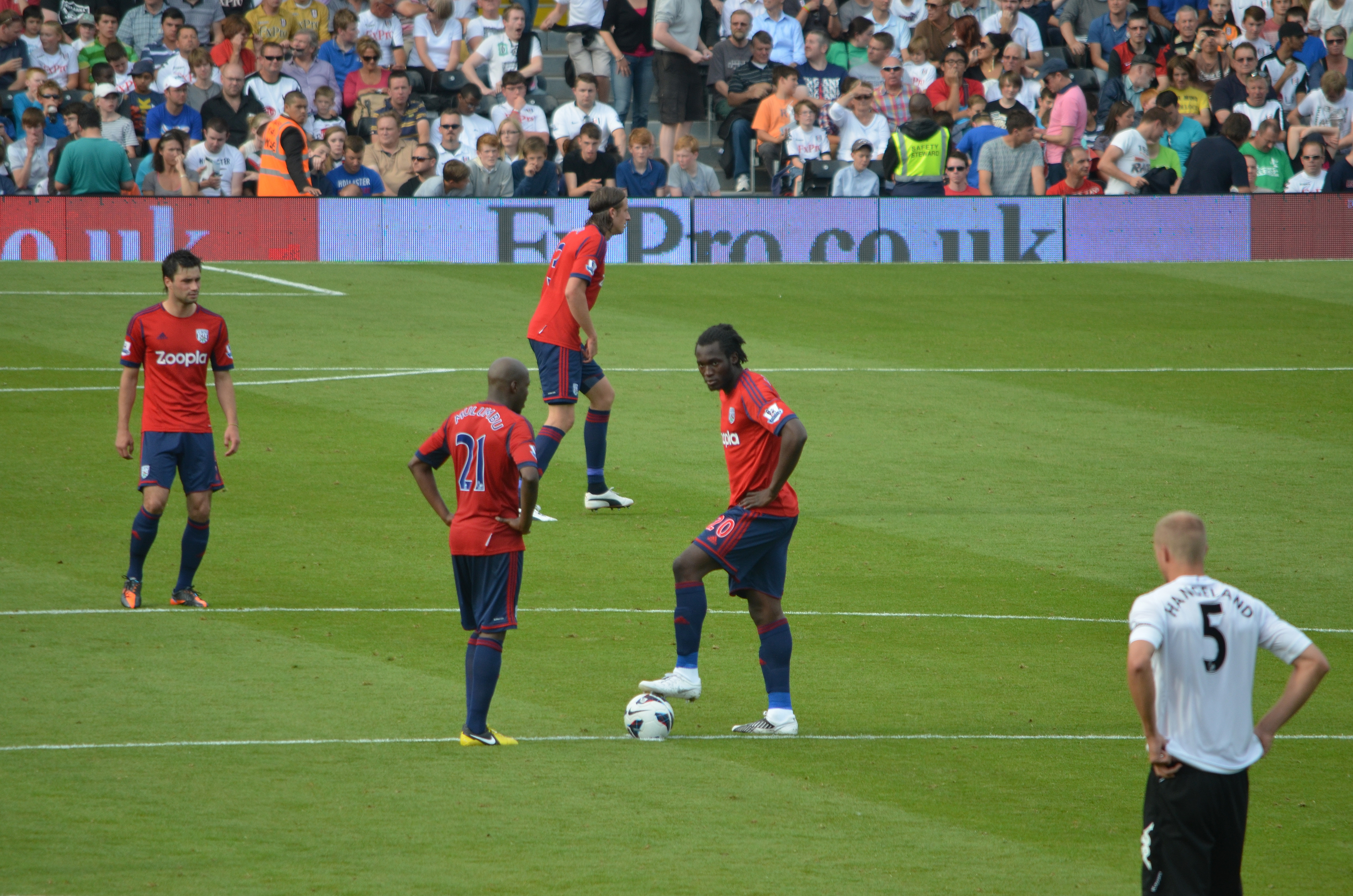
- West Bromwich Albion players during a match against Fulham in September 2012
- Chairman: Jeremy Peace
- Manager: Steve Clarke
- Stadium: The Hawthorns
- Premier League: 8th
- FA Cup: Third round
- League Cup: Third round
- Top goalscorer: League: Romelu Lukaku (17); All: Romelu Lukaku (17)
- Highest home attendance: 26,438 (vs. Manchester United, 19 May 2013)
- Lowest home attendance: 11,184 (vs. Queens Park Rangers, 18 January 2013)
- Average home league attendance: 25,360
Home colours	Away colours

The 2012–13 season was West Bromwich Albion's third consecutive season in the Premier League, and their seventh in total. During the season, they also competed in the League Cup and the FA Cup. The club enjoyed their best ever season in the Premier League, finishing eighth in the league with a club record 49 points and 14 wins.

Their manager for the season was Steve Clarke, after former manager Roy Hodgson left to manage the England national team.

== Players ==
=== First-team squad ===
Squad at end of season

Note: Flags indicate national team as defined under FIFA eligibility rules; some limited exceptions apply. Players may hold more than one non-FIFA nationality.

No.	Pos.	Nation	Player
1	GK	ENG	Ben Foster
2	DF	IRL	Steven Reid (Note: Reid was born in Kingston upon Thames, England, and represented them at U-16 level, but also qualified to represent the Republic of Ireland internationally through his grandfather and made his international debut for the Republic of Ireland in 2001.)
3	DF	SWE	Jonas Olsson
4	DF	MKD	Goran Popov (on loan from Dynamo Kyiv)
5	MF	ARG	Claudio Yacob
6	DF	ENG	Liam Ridgewell
7	MF	SCO	James Morrison (Note: Morrison was born in Darlington, England, and represented them at U-17, U-18, U-19, and U-21 level, but also qualified to represent Scotland internationally through his grandparents and made his international debut for Scotland in May 2008.)
8	FW	SWE	Markus Rosenberg
9	FW	IRL	Shane Long
11	MF	NIR	Chris Brunt
13	GK	WAL	Boaz Myhill (Note: Myhill was born in Modesto, California, United States, but was raised in England from the age of 1, qualifying to represent any of the home nations. He represented England at U-17, U-18, and U-20 level before making his international debut for Wales in March 2008.)
14	MF	ENG	Jerome Thomas
15	MF	ENG	George Thorne
16	MF	SCO	Scott Allan
17	MF	SCO	Graham Dorrans
19	GK	ENG	Luke Daniels
20	FW	BEL	Romelu Lukaku (on loan from Chelsea)
21	MF	COD	Youssuf Mulumbu (Note: Mulumbu was born in Kinshasa, Zaire (now Democratic Republic of the Congo), but also qualified to represent France internationally and represented them at U-20 and U-21 level before making his international debut for the Democratic Republic of the Congo in March 2008.)

No.	Pos.	Nation	Player
22	MF	HUN	Zoltán Gera
23	DF	NIR	Gareth McAuley
24	FW	NGR	Peter Odemwingie (Note: Odemwingie was born in Tashkent, Uzbek SRR, Soviet Union (now Uzbekistan), but also qualified to represent Nigeria internationally through his father and made his international debut for Nigeria in May 2002.)
25	DF	ENG	Craig Dawson
26	DF	ENG	James Hurst
28	DF	ENG	Billy Jones
30	DF	ROU	Gabriel Tamaș
32	FW	GUF	Marc-Antoine Fortuné
34	FW	ENG	Kemar Roofe
35	MF	SKN	Romaine Sawyers (Note: Sawyers was born in Birmingham, England, but also qualified to represent Saint Kitts and Nevis internationally and represented them at U-23 level before making his international debut for Saint Kitts and Nevis in October 2012.)
36	MF	ENG	Adil Nabi
37	FW	WAL	Kayleden Brown (Note: Brown was born in Birmingham, England, but also qualified to represent Wales internationally and represented them at U-17 and U-19 level.)
38	FW	ENG	Saido Berahino (Note: Berahino was born in Bujumbura, Burundi, but was raised in England from the age of 10 and represented them at every youth level between U-16 and U-21 level before making his international debut for Burundi in September 2018.)
40	DF	ENG	Liam O'Neil
41	DF	ENG	Cameron Gayle
42	DF	MSR	Donervon Daniels
43	FW	ENG	Izzy Brown

=== Left club during season ===
Note: Flags indicate national team as defined under FIFA eligibility rules; some limited exceptions apply. Players may hold more than one non-FIFA nationality.

No.	Pos.	Nation	Player
10	MF	BEL	Yassine El Ghanassy (on loan from Gent)
18	DF	CHI	Gonzalo Jara (on loan to Nottingham Forest)

No.	Pos.	Nation	Player
27	MF	ENG	Sam Mantom (to Walsall)
39	FW	NZL	Chris Wood (to Leicester City)

== Transfers ==
=== In ===
Date	Pos.	No.	Name	From	Fee	Ref
29 June 2012	GK	1	Ben Foster	Birmingham City	£4,000,000	
11 July 2012	MF	10	Yassine El Ghanassy	Gent	Season-long loan	
24 July 2012	MF	5	Claudio Yacob	Racing Club	Free	
7 August 2012	FW	8	Markus Rosenberg	Werder Bremen	Free	
10 August 2012	FW	20	Romelu Lukaku	Chelsea	Season-long loan	
31 August 2012	DF	4	Goran Popov	Dynamo Kyiv	Season-long loan	

=== Out ===
Date	Pos.	No.	Name	To	Fee	Ref
16 May 2012	DF	2	Joe Mattock	Sheffield Wednesday	Free	
16 May 2012	MF	5	Somen Tchoyi	Released	Free	
16 May 2012	DF	20	Nicky Shorey	Reading	Free	
16 May 2012	FW	41	Lateef Elford-Alliyu	Bury	Free	
24 May 2012	MF	34	Paul Downing	Walsall	Free	
1 June 2012	MF	8	Keith Andrews	Bolton Wanderers	Free	
1 June 2012	GK	13	Márton Fülöp	Asteras Tripolis	Free	
1 June 2012	DF	33	Paul Scharner	Hamburger SV	Free	
1 June 2012	MF	44	Jamie Edge	Released	Free	
14 August 2012	FW	31	Simon Cox	Nottingham Forest	Undisclosed	
28 December 2012	FW	39	Chris Wood	Leicester City	Undisclosed	

=== On loan ===
Date	Pos.	No.	Name	To	Ref
17 September 2012	FW	39	Chris Wood	Millwall	
29 October 2012	MF	16	Scott Allan	Portsmouth	
21 November 2012	MF	15	George Thorne	Peterborough United	
22 November 2012	MF	14	Jerome Thomas	Leeds United	
22 November 2012	DF	42	Donervon Daniels	Tranmere Rovers	
10 January 2013	DF	18	Gonzalo Jara	Nottingham Forest	

== Match results ==
=== Pre-season friendlies ===
19 July 2012	Malmö FF	1–0	West Bromwich Albion	Swedbank Stadion
18:00	Nilsson 8'	Report		Attendance: 3,128; Referee: Martin Hansson

25 July 2012	Copenhagen	0–3	West Bromwich Albion	Parken
18:00		Report	Reid 15'; Long 89' (pen.); Tamaș 90+2'	Attendance: 3,197

28 July 2012	Barnsley	0–0	West Bromwich Albion	Oakwell
15:00		Report

10 August 2012	Nottingham Forest	0–2	West Bromwich Albion	City Ground
19:45			Mulumbu 7'; Long 18' (pen.)

=== Premier League ===
Matchday	1	2	3	4	5	6	7	8	9	10	11	12	13	14	15	16	17	18	19	20	21	22	23	24	25	26	27	28	29	30	31	32	33	34	35	36	37	38
Ground	H	A	H	A	H	A	H	H	A	H	A	H	A	A	H	A	H	H	A	A	H	A	H	A	H	A	H	A	H	A	A	H	H	A	H	A	A	H
Result	W	D	W	L	W	D	W	L	L	W	W	W	W	L	L	L	D	W	W	L	L	L	D	L	L	W	W	L	W	D	L	L	D	W	L	L	L	D
Position	3	3	3	6	4	6	6	6	8	5	5	4	3	4	5	6	7	7	6	7	7	7	8	9	9	8	7	9	8	8	8	8	9	8	8	8	8	8

Source: WorldFootball.com
A = Away; H = Home; W = Win; D = Draw; L = Loss

18 August 2012 1	West Bromwich Albion	3–0	Liverpool	West Bromwich
15:00 BST	Gera 43'; Odemwingie 64' (pen.); Fortuné (yellow card) 75'; Lukaku 77'	Report	Johnson (yellow card) 41'; Suárez (yellow card) 45+3'; Lucas (yellow card) 56'; Agger (red card) 58'; Carroll (yellow card) 90+3'	Stadium: The Hawthorns; Attendance: 26,039 (2,600 away); Referee: Phil Dowd (Staffordshire)

25 August 2012 2	Tottenham Hotspur	1–1	West Bromwich Albion	London
15:00 BST	Vertonghen (yellow card) 48'; Assou-Ekotto 74'	Report	Mulumbu (yellow card) 30'; Reid (yellow card) 81'; Morrison 90'	Stadium: White Hart Lane; Attendance: 36,166 (1,639 away); Referee: Mike Dean (Cheshire)

1 September 2012 3	West Bromwich Albion	2–0	Everton	West Bromwich
15:00 BST	Reid (yellow card) 47'; Long 65'; McAuley 82'	Report	Hibbert (yellow card) 36'; Distin (yellow card) 66'; Neville (yellow card) 70'; Fellaini (yellow card) 71'	Stadium: The Hawthorns; Attendance: 25,383 (2,600 away); Referee: Jonathan Moss (West Yorkshire)

15 September 2012 4	Fulham	3–0	West Bromwich Albion	London
15:00 BST	Berbatov 32', 45+1' (pen.); Sidwell 89'	Report	Odemwingie (red card) 38'	Stadium: Craven Cottage; Attendance: 25,691 (1,478 away); Referee: Roger East (Wiltshire)

22 September 2012 5	West Bromwich Albion	1–0	Reading	West Bromwich
15:00 BST	Lukaku 71'; Yacob (yellow card) 89'	Report		Stadium: The Hawthorns; Attendance: 23,854 (1,522 away); Referee: Chris Foy (Merseyside)

30 September 2012 6	Aston Villa	1–1	West Bromwich Albion	Birmingham
16:00 BST	Delph (yellow card) 23'; Bent 80'	Report	Long 51'; Tamaș (yellow card) 90+4'	Stadium: Villa Park; Attendance: 34,489 (2,800 away); Referee: Anthony Taylor

6 October 2012 7	West Bromwich Albion	3–2	Queens Park Rangers	West Bromwich
15:00 BST	Morrison 5'; Gera 22'; Tamaș (yellow card) 25'; Mulumbu 85', (yellow card) 90+4'	Report	Taarabt 35'; Park (yellow card) 45+1'; Mackie (yellow card) 89'; Granero 90+2'	Stadium: The Hawthorns; Attendance: 23,987; Referee: Mike Jones

20 October 2012 8	West Bromwich Albion	1–2	Manchester City	West Bromwich
15:00 BST	Long (yellow card) 27', (goal) 67'; Tamaș (yellow card) 32'; Yacob (yellow card) 35'; Fortuné (yellow card) 61'	Report	Džeko 80', 90', (yellow card) 90+2'; Balotelli (yellow card) 19'; Milner (red card) 23'; Y. Touré (yellow card) 90'	Stadium: The Hawthorns; Attendance: 24,891 (2,600 away); Referee: Mark Clattenburg

28 October 2012 9	Newcastle United	2–1	West Bromwich Albion	Newcastle upon Tyne
15:00 BST	Ba 35'; Perch (yellow card) 44'; Cabaye (yellow card) 68'; Gutiérrez (yellow card) 77'; Cissé 90+3'	Report	Mulumbu (yellow card) 50'; Ridgewell (yellow card) 52'; Lukaku 55'	Stadium: St James' Park; Attendance: 49,731 (1,493 away); Referee: Chris Foy

5 November 2012 10	West Bromwich Albion	2–0	Southampton	West Bromwich
20:00 GMT	Jones (yellow card) 10'; Odemwingie 36', 60'	Report		Stadium: The Hawthorns; Attendance: 25,635 (1,400 away); Referee: Mark Halsey

10 November 2012 11	Wigan Athletic	1–2	West Bromwich Albion	Wigan
15:00 GMT	Koné 44'; McCarthy (yellow card) 78'	Report	Morrison 31'; Gary Caldwell 43' (o.g.); Yacob (yellow card) 47'; Lukaku (yellow card) 70'; Jones (yellow card) 77'; Gera (yellow card) 90'	Stadium: DW Stadium; Attendance: 17,812 (3,824 away); Referee: Neil Swarbrick

17 November 2012 12	West Bromwich Albion	2–1	Chelsea	West Bromwich
15:00 GMT	Long 10'; Odemwingie 51'	Report	Hazard 39'	Stadium: The Hawthorns; Attendance: 25,933 (2,599 away); Referee: Michael Oliver

24 November 2012 13	Sunderland	2–4	West Bromwich Albion	Sunderland
12:45 GMT	O'Shea (yellow card) 8'; Gardner (yellow card) 52', (goal) 73'; Sessègnon 87'	Report	Long (yellow card) 20', (goal) 44'; Gera 30'; Morrison (yellow card) 39'; Lukaku 81' (pen.); Ridgewell (yellow card) 89'; Fortuné 90+4'	Stadium: Stadium of Light; Attendance: 36,390 (702 away); Referee: Mike Dean

28 November 2012 14	Swansea City	3–1	West Bromwich Albion	Swansea
19:45 GMT	Michu 9'; Routledge 11', 39'	Report	McAuley (yellow card) 13'; Brunt (yellow card) 45'; Lukaku 45+3'; Olsson (yellow card) 52'; Jones (yellow card) 90+3'	Stadium: Liberty Stadium; Attendance: 20,377; Referee: Lee Mason

1 December 2012 15	West Bromwich Albion	0–1	Stoke City	West Bromwich
15:00 GMT		Report	Huth (yellow card) 35'; Adam (yellow card) 44'; Shawcross (yellow card) 49'; Whitehead 75'	Stadium: The Hawthorns; Attendance: 24,739 (2,600 away); Referee: Kevin Friend

8 December 2012 16	Arsenal	2–0	West Bromwich Albion	London
15:00 GMT	Arteta 26' (pen.), 64' (pen.); Giroud (yellow card) 54'; Mertesacker (yellow card) 67'	Report	Olsson (yellow card) 54'; Brunt (yellow card) 58'; Reid (yellow card) 78'	Stadium: Emirates Stadium; Attendance: 60,083 (2,000 away); Referee: Mike Jones

16 December 2012 17	West Bromwich Albion	0–0	West Ham United	West Bromwich
16:00 GMT	Billy Jones (yellow card) 74'; Mulumbu (yellow card) 84'; Olsson (yellow card) 90+3'	Report	O'Brien (yellow card) 29'; Nolan (yellow card) 84'; Tomkins (yellow card) 86'	Stadium: The Hawthorns; Attendance: 24,186; Referee: Phil Dowd

22 December 2012 18	West Bromwich Albion	2–1	Norwich City	West Bromwich
15:00 GMT	Gera 44'; Lukaku 82'; Popov (yellow card) 90+4'	Report	Snodgrass 23'; Turner (yellow card) 57'	Stadium: The Hawthorns; Attendance: 25,799; Referee: Martin Atkinson

26 December 2012 19	Queens Park Rangers	1–2	West Bromwich Albion	London
15:00 GMT	Cissé 68'; Mbia (yellow card) 84'	Report	Brunt 29'; Green 49' (o.g.)	Stadium: Loftus Road; Attendance: 17,782 (1,643 away); Referee: Chris Foy

29 December 2012 20	Manchester United	2–0	West Bromwich Albion	Manchester
15:00 GMT	McAuley 9' (o.g.); Valencia (yellow card) 64'; Van Persie 90'	Report		Stadium: Old Trafford; Attendance: 75,595 (1,800 away); Referee: Jonathan Moss (West Yorkshire)

1 January 2013 21	West Bromwich Albion	1–2	Fulham	West Bromwich
12:45 GMT	Lukaku 49'	Report	Berbatov 39'; Kačaniklić 58'	Stadium: The Hawthorns; Attendance: 25,436 (410 away); Referee: Mike Dean (Cheshire)

12 January 2013 22	Reading	3–2	West Bromwich Albion	Reading
15:00 GMT	Kébé 82'; Le Fondre 88'; Pogrebnyak 90', (yellow card) 90+1'	Report	Lukaku 19', 69'; Jones (yellow card) 37'	Stadium: Madejski Stadium; Attendance: 23,495 (2,241 away); Referee: Kevin Friend

19 January 2013 23	West Bromwich Albion	2–2	Aston Villa	West Bromwich
17:30 GMT	Olsson (yellow card) 21'; Lukaku (yellow card) 43'; Brunt 49'; Dorrans (yellow card) 62'; Odemwingie 83'	Report	Benteke 12'; Agbonlahor (yellow card) 21', (goal) 31'; Lichaj (yellow card) 58'; Lowton (yellow card) 61'	Stadium: The Hawthorns; Attendance: 25,583 (2,600 away); Referee: Lee Probert (Wiltshire)

30 January 2013 24	Everton	2–1	West Bromwich Albion	Liverpool
19:45 GMT	Baines 29', 45+2' (pen.)	Report	Yacob (yellow card) 61'; Long 65'; Dorrans (yellow card) 80'	Stadium: Goodison Park; Attendance: 31,376 (873 away); Referee: Michael Oliver

3 February 2013 25	West Bromwich Albion	0–1	Tottenham Hotspur	West Bromwich
13:30 GMT	Popov (red card) 47'; Dorrans (yellow card) 69'	Report	Bale 67'	Stadium: The Hawthorns; Attendance: 24,978 (2,600 away); Referee: Mark Clattenburg

11 February 2013 26	Liverpool	0–2	West Bromwich Albion	Liverpool
20:00 GMT	Suárez (yellow card) 90'	Report	Reid (yellow card) 42'; Ridgewell (yellow card) 69'; Morrison (yellow card) 71'; Brunt (yellow card) 73'; McAuley 80'; Lukaku 90'	Stadium: Anfield; Attendance: 44,752 (983 away); Referee: Jonathan Moss

23 February 2013 27	West Bromwich Albion	2–1	Sunderland	West Bromwich
15:00GMT	Lukaku 35' (pen.), 75', (yellow card) 75'; Morrison (yellow card) 79'	Report	Bramble (yellow card) 40'; Sessègnon 79'	Stadium: The Hawthorns; Attendance: 25,924 (2,600 away); Referee: Roger East

2 March 2013 28	Chelsea	1–0	West Bromwich Albion	London
15:00 GMT	Ba 28'; Hazard (yellow card) 56'	Report	McAuley (yellow card) 64'; Odemwingie (yellow card) 84'	Stadium: Stamford Bridge; Attendance: 41,548 (1,217 away); Referee: Roger East

9 March 2013 29	West Bromwich Albion	2–1	Swansea City	West Bromwich
15:00 GMT	Lukaku 40'; Jones (yellow card) 41'; De Guzmán 61' (o.g.)	Report	Moore 33'; Dyer (yellow card) 88'	Stadium: The Hawthorns; Attendance: 24,832 (1,400 away); Referee: Lee Mason

16 March 2013 30	Stoke City	0–0	West Bromwich Albion	Stoke
15:00 GMT	Shotton (yellow card) 43'; Etherington (yellow card) 58'	Report	Brunt (yellow card) 33'; Morrison (yellow card) 45'	Stadium: Britannia Stadium; Attendance: 26,317 (2,196 away); Referee: Mike Dean

30 March 2013 31	West Ham United	3–1	West Bromwich Albion	London
15:00 GMT	Carroll 16', 80'; O'Neil 28'; Reid (yellow card) 77'	Report	Long (yellow card) 66'; Dorrans 88' (pen.); Mulumbu (red card) 90'	Stadium: Upton Park; Attendance: 34,966 (1,500 away); Referee: Andre Marriner

6 April 2013 32	West Bromwich Albion	1–2	Arsenal	West Bromwich
15:00 BST	Morrison 71' (pen.); Jones (yellow card) 77'; Ridgewell (yellow card) 85'	Report	Rosický 20', 50', (yellow card) 36'; Ramsey (yellow card) 25'; Koscielny (yellow card) 65'; Mertesacker (red card) 70'; Arteta (yellow card) 82'	Stadium: The Hawthorns; Attendance: 26,144 (2,600 away); Referee: Howard Webb

20 April 2013 33	West Bromwich Albion	1–1	Newcastle United	West Bromwich
15:00 BST	Jones 64'	Report	Gouffran 8'; Cabaye (yellow card) 86'; Sissoko (yellow card) 90'	Stadium: The Hawthorns; Attendance: 25,671 (2,590 away); Referee: Mike Jones

27 April 2013 34	Southampton	0–3	West Bromwich Albion	Southampton
15:00 BST	Hooiveld (yellow card) 27'; Fox (yellow card) 54' (yellow-red card) 82'; Ramírez (red card) 70'	Report	Fortuné 6', (red card) 70'; Yacob (yellow card) 33'; Ridgewell (yellow card) 64'; Lukaku 66'; Long 77'	Stadium: St Mary's Stadium; Attendance: 31,946 (3,115 away); Referee: Robert Madley

4 May 2013 35	West Bromwich Albion	2–3	Wigan Athletic	West Bromwich
15:00 BST	Ridgewell (yellow card) 8'; Long 28'; Jones (yellow card) 38'; McAuley 49', (yellow card) 75'; Brown (yellow card) 90'	Report	Kone 38'; Maloney (yellow card) 56'; McArthur 58'; Golobart (yellow card) 66'; McManaman 79'; Scharner (yellow card) 90'	Stadium: The Hawthorns; Attendance: 25,756 (1,400 away); Referee: Lee Probert

7 May 2013 36	Manchester City	1–0	West Bromwich Albion	Manchester
19:45 BST	Kolarov (yellow card) 24'; Dzeko 35'; Nasri (yellow card) 66'	Report	Yacob (yellow card) 65'	Stadium: City of Manchester Stadium; Attendance: 46,158 (527 away); Referee: Phil Dowd

12 May 2013 37	Norwich City	4–0	West Bromwich Albion	Norwich
15:00 BST	Snodgrass 25'; Howson (yellow card) 45', (goal) 89'; Holt 62'; McAuley 64' (o.g.); Hoolahan (yellow card) 70'	Report	Olsson (yellow card) 47'	Stadium: Carrow Road; Attendance: 26,837 (2,389 away); Referee: Howard Webb

19 May 2013 38	West Bromwich Albion	5–5	Manchester United	West Bromwich
16:00 BST	Morrison 39'; Lukaku 52', 81', 86'; Mulumbu 81'	Report	Kagawa 6'; Olsson 9' (o.g.); Büttner 30'; Van Persie 53'; Hernández 63'; Scholes (yellow card) 82'	Stadium: The Hawthorns; Attendance: 26,438 (2,600 away); Referee: Michael Oliver

=== Football League Cup ===
28 August 2012 Second Round	Yeovil Town	2–4	West Bromwich Albion	Yeovil
19:45 BST	Reid 15', 48'	Report	Brunt 39'; Long 45+1', 81'; El Ghanassy 73'	Stadium: Huish Park; Attendance: 6,228 (1,383 away); Referee: Darren Sheldrake (Surrey)

26 September 2012 Third Round	West Bromwich Albion	1–2	Liverpool	West Bromwich
20:00 BST	Tamaș 3'	Report	Şahin 17', 82'	Stadium: The Hawthorns; Attendance: 21,164 (5,200 away); Referee: Michael Oliver

=== FA Cup ===
5 January 2013 Third Round	Queens Park Rangers	1–1	West Bromwich Albion	London
15:00 BST	Dyer 90+2'	Report	Long 79'; Brunt (yellow card) 87'	Stadium: Loftus Road; Attendance: 8,984 (1,513 away); Referee: Mark Clattenburg

15 January 2013 Third Round Replay	West Bromwich Albion	0–1	Queens Park Rangers	West Bromwich
20:00 BST	Thomas (yellow card) 51'; Rosenberg (yellow card) 77'	Report	Ben Haim (yellow card) 18'; Bothroyd 75'	Stadium: The Hawthorns; Attendance: 11,184 (823 away); Referee: Martin Atkinson

== Squad statistics ==
As of 6 November 2012

No.	Pos.	Name	League		FA Cup		League Cup		Other		Total		Discipline	
No.	Pos.	Name	Apps	Goals	Apps	Goals	Apps	Goals	Apps	Goals	Apps	Goals	Yellow card	Red card
1	GK	(England) Ben Foster	30	0	0	0	1	0	0	0	17	0	0	0
2	MF	(Republic of Ireland) Steven Reid	11	0	0+1	0	0	0	0	0	5+1	0	3	0
3	DF	(Sweden) Jonas Olsson	36	0	0	0	1	0	0	0	11	0	0	0
4	DF	(North Macedonia) Goran Popov	10+2	0	1	0	0	0	0	0	2+1	0	0	0
5	MF	(Argentina) Claudio Yacob	29+1	0	0	0	0	0	0	0	9	0	0	0
6	DF	(England) Liam Ridgewell	28+2	0	1	0	1	0	0	0	9	0	0	0
7	MF	(Scotland) James Morrison	33+2	5	2	0	0	0	0	0	9	2	0	0
8	MF	(Sweden) Markus Rosenberg	5+19	0	1	0	2	0	0	0	2+5	0	0	0
9	FW	(Republic of Ireland) Shane Long	25+9	8	1	1	1+1	2	0	0	9+3	5	0	0
10	MF	(Belgium) Yassine El Ghanassy	0	0	0+1	0	1+1	1	0	0	1+1	1	0	0
11	MF	(Northern Ireland) Chris Brunt	23+8	2	1	0	1	1	0	0	3+6	1	0	0
13	GK	(Wales) Boaz Myhill	8	0	2	0	1	0	0	0	1	0	0	0
14	MF	(England) Jerome Thomas^	4+6	0	1+1	0	0	0	0	0	0	0	0	0
15	MF	(England) George Thorne^	3+2	0	2	0	2	0	0	0	2	0	0	0
16	MF	(Scotland) Scott Allan^	0	0	0	0	0	0	0	0	0	0	0	0
17	MF	(Scotland) Graham Dorrans	21+5	1	1	0	1	0	0	0	6+2	0	0	0
18	DF	(Chile) Gonzalo Jara	0+1	0	0	0	1	0	0	0	1+1	0	0	0
19	GK	(England) Luke Daniels	0	0	0	0	0	0	0	0	0	0	0	0
20	FW	(Belgium) Romelu Lukaku	20+15	17	2	0	1	0	0	0	3+7	3	0	0
21	MF	(Democratic Republic of the Congo) Youssouf Mulumbu	28	2	0	0	1+1	0	0	0	11+1	1	4	0
22	MF	(Hungary) Zoltán Gera	14+2	4	1	0	1	0	0	0	7+1	2	1	0
23	DF	(Northern Ireland) Gareth McAuley	36	3	2	0	0	0	0	0	10	1	0	0
24	FW	(Nigeria) Peter Odemwingie	13+12	5	0+1	0	0	0	0	0	5+2	3	0	1
25	DF	(England) Craig Dawson	0	0	0+1	0	1+1	0	0	0	1+1	0	0	0
26	DF	(England) James Hurst	0	0	0	0	0	0	0	0	0	0	0	0
27	MF	(England) Sam Mantom	0	0	0	0	0	0	0	0	0	0	0	0
28	DF	(England) Billy Jones	24+3	1	2	0	2	0	0	0	0	6+2	0	0
30	DF	(Romania) Gabriel Tamaș	7+4	0	2	0	2	1	0	0	5+1	1	1	0
32	FW	(France) Marc-Antoine Fortuné	9+12	2	0+1	0	1+1	0	0	0	10+14	2	0	
34	MF	(England) Kemar Roofe	0	0	0	0	0	0	0	0	0	0	0	0
35	MF	(Saint Kitts and Nevis) Romaine Sawyers	0	0	0	0	0	0	0	0	0	0	0	0
36	FW	(England) Adil Nabi	0	0	0	0	0	0	0	0	0	0	0	0
37	MF	(Wales) Kayleden Brown	0	0	0	0	0	0	0	0	0	0	0	0
38	FW	(Burundi) Saido Berahino	0	0	0	0	0+1	0	0	0	0+1	0	0	0
39	FW	(New Zealand) Chris Wood^	0	0	0	0	0	0	0	0	0	0	0	0
40	DF	(England) Liam O'Neil	0	0	0	0	0	0	0	0	0	0	0	0
41	DF	(England) Cameron Gayle	0	0	0	0	0	0	0	0	0	0	0	0
43	FW	(England) Isaiah Brown	0+1	0	0	0	0	0	0	0	0	0	0	0
–	–	Own goals	–	0	–	0	–	0	–	0	–	0	–	0

^On loan

Statistics accurate as of 30 September 2012
