= Claudio Yacob =

Argentine footballer (born 1987)

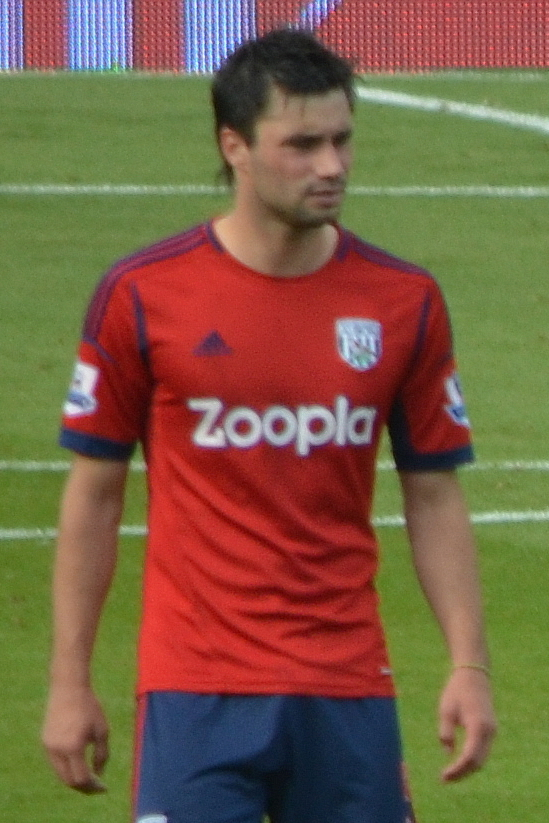
- Yacob playing for West Bromwich Albion in 2012

Personal information
- Full name: Claudio Ariel Yacob
- Date of birth: 18 July 1987 (age 39)
- Place of birth: Carcarañá, Argentina
- Height: 1.81 m (5 ft 11 in)
- Position: Defensive midfielder

Youth career
- 2001–2006: Racing Club

Senior career*
| Years | Team | Apps | (Gls) |
| 2006–2012 | Racing Club | 144 | (7) |
| 2012–2018 | West Bromwich Albion | 160 | (2) |
| 2018–2020 | Nottingham Forest | 16 | (0) |
| 2020 | Nacional | 16 | (1) |
| 2021 | Huracán | 24 | (1) |
| 2022 | Rosario Central | 9 | (0) |
| 2022 | Universitario de Deportes | 8 | (0) |

International career
| 2007 | Argentina U20 | 20 | (1) |
| 2011 | Argentina | 2 | (1) |
- * Club domestic league appearances and goals as of 04:10, 18 June 2022 (UTC)

Claudio Ariel Yacob (born 18 July 1987) is a former Argentine professional footballer who played as a defensive midfielder.

He began his career at Racing Club, and played two international games for Argentina in 2011. He moved to England's West Bromwich Albion in 2012 where he made 171 total appearances over six Premier League seasons. After a brief spell with Nottingham Forest in the Championship, he signed for Nacional in January 2020.He then returned to Argentina, playing for Huracán and Rosario Central in 2021 and the first half 2022. Before finishing his career playing for Universitario in Peru, during the latter half of 2022.

== Club career ==
=== West Bromwich Albion ===
On 24 July 2012, Yacob was loaned to Premier League club West Bromwich Albion on a three-year deal. He had been a free agent following the end of his five-year association with Racing Club de Avellaneda. He made his debut against Liverpool on 18 August, in a 3–0 home win, and was described as "outstanding" by Stuart James of The Guardian. In his debut season, he developed a strong midfield partnership with Youssouf Mulumbu, and won the club's player of the month award for March 2013.

Yacob scored his first West Brom goal on 6 October 2013, heading Morgan Amalfitano's cross to open a 1–1 draw with Arsenal at The Hawthorns. He was sent off twice in 2014–15: a straight red for a 29th-minute foul on Diego Costa in a 2–0 loss at Chelsea on 22 November, and a double booking on 7 March in a 2–0 loss to rivals Aston Villa in the sixth round of the FA Cup.

Yacob signed a new two-year contract with the Baggies on 10 July 2015. He signed a further deal on 29 September 2016, in the shape of a two-year contract with an option of a further one.

On 20 June 2018, it was announced that Yacob would leave West Brom upon the expiration of his contract.

=== Nottingham Forest ===
On 6 September 2018, Yacob signed with EFL Championship club Nottingham Forest on a two-year deal. He made his debut on 3 November, playing the full 90 minutes of a 1–0 home win over leaders Sheffield United.

Having not featured at all in the season, Yacob and Forest agreed to mutually terminate his contract on 27 January 2020.

=== Nacional ===
On the same day as leaving Forest, Yacob joined Uruguayan Primera División side Nacional. He made his debut on 1 February in the 2020 Supercopa Uruguaya, as a half-time substitute for Joaquín Trasante in a 4–2 extra-time loss to Liverpool Montevideo. Three weeks later in his second league game, he scored in the seventh minute of added time to grasp a 2–2 home draw against Cerro Largo F.C.

=== Huracán ===
On 17 February 2021, Yacob returned to Argentina, joining Huracán on a free transfer, signing a one-year contract. Per directions of Frank Kudelka, Huracán's manager at the time, his contract was not renewed at the end of the 2021 season.

=== Rosario Central ===
On 4 February 2022, Yacob joined Rosario Central on a contract until the end of the season. During the mid-season break, he was excluded from the squad by new coach Carlos Tevez.

=== Universitario ===
After his rapid exit from Rosario Central, Yacob joined Peruvian side Universitario, on 8 July 2022. He signed a 1.5 year contract with winningest club of the Peruvian Primera División. On 30 November 2022, after only playing 217 minutes, his contract was rescinded.

== International career ==
Yacob earned two senior caps for Argentina, both in friendlies in the first half of 2011. On 16 March, he debuted in a 4–1 win over Venezuela, being replaced after an hour by Fabián Rinaudo. On 20 April, he scored in a 2–2 draw with Ecuador at the Estadio José María Minella in Mar del Plata, as did his Racing Club teammate Gabriel Hauche in an experimental team made up of domestic-based players.

== Personal life ==
When not playing football, Yacob enjoys playing the guitar and painting. He also describes himself as a big fan of the Beatles and Adele.

== Career statistics ==
As of 16 August 2020

| Club | Season | League | | | National Cup | | League Cup | | Continental (Note: Appearances in Copa Libertadores) | | Other (Note: Appearance in Supercopa Uruguaya) | | Total | |
| Club | Season | Division | Apps | Goals | Apps | Goals | Apps | Goals | Apps | Goals | Apps | Goals | Apps | Goals |
|---|---|---|---|---|---|---|---|---|---|---|---|---|---|---|
| Racing Club | 2006–07 | Argentine Primera División | 14 | 0 | 0 | 0 | — | | — | | — | | 14 | 0 |
| Racing Club | 2007–08 | Argentine Primera División | 29 | 0 | 0 | 0 | — | | — | | — | | 29 | 0 |
| Racing Club | 2008–09 | Argentine Primera División | 28 | 2 | 0 | 0 | — | | — | | — | | 28 | 2 |
| Racing Club | 2009–10 | Argentine Primera División | 27 | 2 | 0 | 0 | — | | — | | — | | 27 | 2 |
| Racing Club | 2010–11 | Argentine Primera División | 25 | 2 | 0 | 0 | — | | — | | — | | 25 | 2 |
| Racing Club | 2011–12 | Argentine Primera División | 21 | 1 | 0 | 0 | — | | — | | — | | 21 | 1 |
| Total | | | 144 | 7 | 0 | 0 | 0 | 0 | 0 | 0 | 0 | 0 | 144 | 7 |
| West Bromwich Albion | 2012–13 | Premier League | 30 | 0 | 0 | 0 | 0 | 0 | — | | — | | 30 | 0 |
| West Bromwich Albion | 2013–14 | Premier League | 27 | 1 | 1 | 0 | 1 | 0 | — | | — | | 28 | 1 |
| West Bromwich Albion | 2014–15 | Premier League | 20 | 0 | 4 | 0 | 2 | 0 | — | | — | | 24 | 0 |
| West Bromwich Albion | 2015–16 | Premier League | 34 | 0 | 3 | 0 | 1 | 0 | — | | — | | 38 | 0 |
| West Bromwich Albion | 2016–17 | Premier League | 33 | 0 | 1 | 0 | 0 | 0 | — | | — | | 33 | 0 |
| West Bromwich Albion | 2017–18 | Premier League | 16 | 0 | 1 | 0 | 1 | 1 | — | | — | | 18 | 1 |
| Total | | | 160 | 1 | 10 | 0 | 5 | 1 | 0 | 0 | 0 | 0 | 175 | 2 |
| Nottingham Forest | 2018–19 | Championship | 16 | 0 | 1 | 0 | 0 | 0 | — | | — | | 17 | 0 |
| Nacional | 2020 | Uruguayan Primera División | 16 | 1 | — | | — | | 6 | 0 | 1 | 0 | 23 | 1 |
| Huracán | 2021 | Argentine Primera División | 24 | 1 | 0 | 0 | — | | — | | — | | 24 | 1 |
| Rosario Central | 2022 | Argentine Primera División | 10 | 0 | 1 | 0 | — | | — | | — | | 11 | 0 |
| Universitario | 2022 | Peruvian Primera División | 8 | 0 | 0 | 0 | — | | — | | — | | 8 | 0 |
| Career total | | | 378 | 10 | 12 | 0 | 5 | 1 | 6 | 0 | 1 | 0 | 402 | 11 |

== Honours ==
Argentina U20

- FIFA U-20 World Cup: 2007
