= Liam Ridgewell =

English footballer (born 1984)

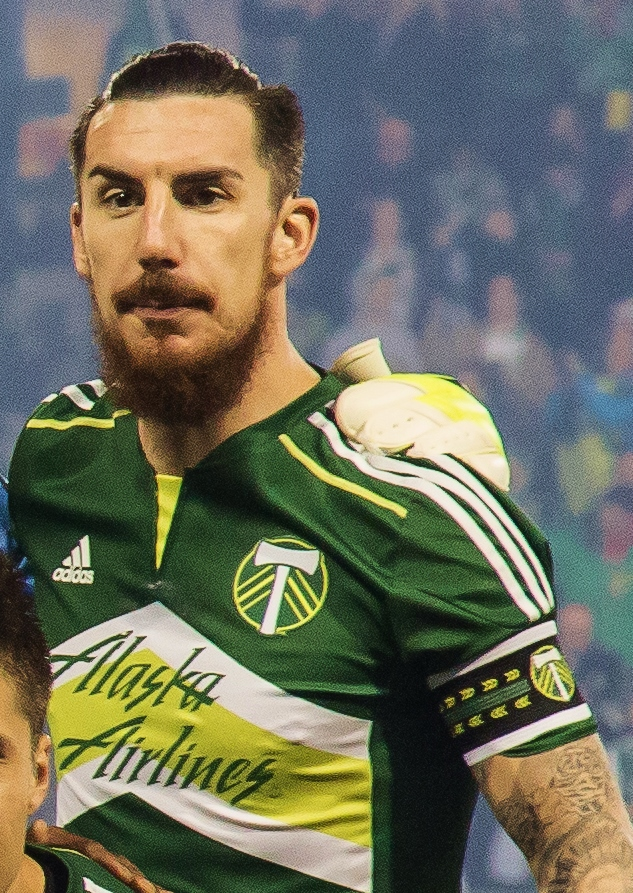
- Ridgewell lining up for the Portland Timbers in 2015

Personal information
- Full name: Liam Matthew Ridgewell
- Date of birth: 21 July 1984 (age 42)
- Place of birth: Bexleyheath, England
- Height: 6 ft 2 in (1.88 m)
- Position: Defender

Youth career
- 1999–2001: West Ham United
- 2001–2002: Aston Villa

Senior career*
Years	Team	Apps	(Gls)
2002–2007	Aston Villa	79	(7)
2002	→ AFC Bournemouth (loan)	5	(0)
2007–2012	Birmingham City	152	(9)
2012–2014	West Bromwich Albion	76	(2)
2014–2019	Portland Timbers	97	(6)
2015	→ Wigan Athletic (loan)	6	(0)
2016	→ Brighton & Hove Albion (loan)	5	(0)
2019	Hull City	7	(0)
2019–2020	Southend United	1	(0)
Total		431	(24)

International career
2002	England U19	1	(1)
2004–2005	England U21	8	(0)
- * Club domestic league appearances and goals

Liam Matthew Ridgewell (born 21 July 1984) is an English retired professional footballer who played as a defender. He was primarily a centre back but could also play at left back.

Ridgewell, who earned eight caps for England at under-21 level, began his senior career with Aston Villa. He spent time on loan at AFC Bournemouth in 2002, before moving to Villa's local rivals Birmingham City in 2007, where he was part of the 2011 Football League Cup Final-winning team. He played for two and a half seasons with West Bromwich Albion, who released him at the end of 2013–14. He then joined the Portland Timbers, whom he captained to victory in MLS Cup 2015. During the MLS off-season, he spent time on loan in England with Wigan Athletic and Brighton & Hove Albion. He ended his career in 2020 after short spells at Hull City and Southend United.

== Club career ==
=== Early career ===
Ridgewell was born in Bexleyheath, in the London Borough of Bexley, and attended Bexleyheath School. He began his career with West Ham United, but moved to Aston Villa in February 2001. He was part of the team that won the 2002 FA Youth Cup final against Everton.

=== Aston Villa ===
The day after scoring for England Under-19s in a 2–2 draw against Yugoslavia in October 2002, he was loaned to AFC Bournemouth of the Third Division, for whom he made his debut in the Football League in a 2–1 win over Hartlepool United on 13 October and played five games in his month's loan spell.

His debut for Aston Villa's first team came on 4 January 2003, in a 4–1 defeat to Blackburn Rovers in the FA Cup third round, when he came on as a substitute to replace Rob Edwards after 69 minutes. His first Premier League appearance came on 28 December 2003, as a 62nd-minute replacement for Mark Delaney in a 3–0 win over Fulham at Villa Park; he made 11 appearances over the season.

On 15 January 2005, Ridgewell scored his first professional goal, heading in Nolberto Solano's cross in the ninth minute to open a 3–0 win over Norwich City. On 10 April, in a 1–1 draw with rivals West Bromwich Albion, he and opponent Jonathan Greening were sent off for headbutting each other.

In the following Premier League campaign, Ridgewell recorded five goals in 32 games, including two in a 3–3 draw at Fulham on 28 December 2005. He scored his only goal of the 2006–07 season against his former club West Ham United on 10 September 2006.

=== Birmingham City ===
Ridgewell completed a move to Birmingham City for a fee of £2 million on 3 August 2007, becoming the first player to transfer between the bitter rivals since Des Bremner in 1984.

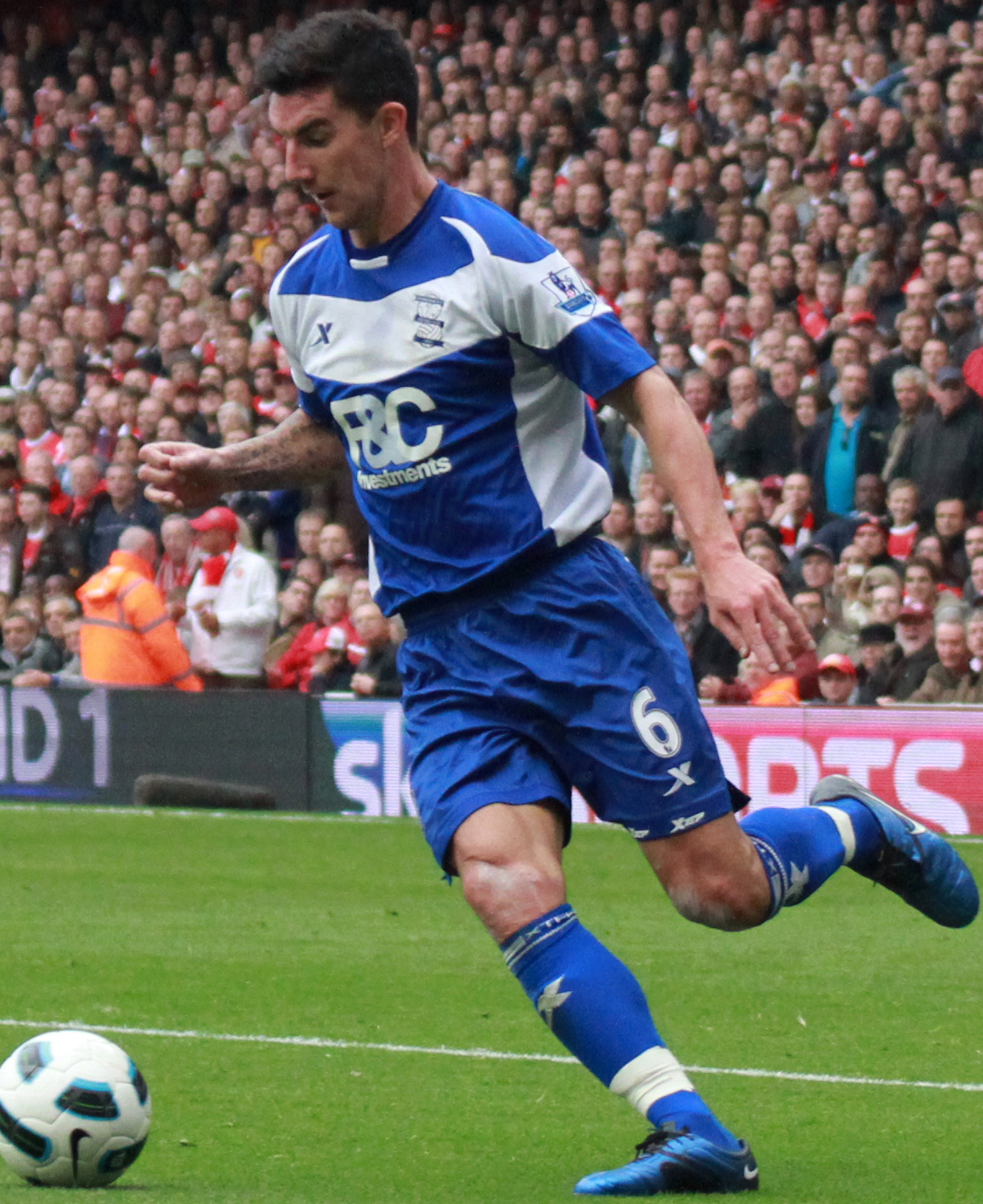
Ridgewell in October 2010

In the absence through injury of regular captain Damien Johnson, Ridgewell was given the captain's armband. He described his appointment as "a real honour". Though concerns were expressed over how some fans might react to a player signing from Aston Villa, Ridgewell's performances won over the doubters. He scored his first goal for the club in their 3–2 win against Wigan Athletic at St Andrew's in October, but then scored an own goal in the Birmingham derby two weeks later, also at St Andrew's.

In April 2009, Ridgewell suffered a broken leg after a challenge by Plymouth Argyle midfielder Jamie Mackie. He made an unexpectedly quick return to the side five months later, playing in the less familiar position of left back. He continued in that role because of the form of preferred centre-backs Roger Johnson and Scott Dann, and played there as Birmingham went on a club-record 12-match unbeaten run in the top division and set a Premier League record by fielding the same starting eleven for nine consecutive games. He scored a 91st-minute equaliser against Tottenham Hotspur on 30 January 2010 which ensured that Birmingham remained unbeaten at home since the previous September.

Ridgewell continued his goalscoring form with a stoppage-time winner against Derby County to send Birmingham through to the quarter-finals of the FA Cup, had a goal disallowed in the quarter-final match against Portsmouth when the ball had "clearly crossed the line", and scored an equalising goal against Liverpool in the league.

In June 2010, Ridgewell signed a new contract with Birmingham, to expire in June 2013. He played the full 90 minutes as Birmingham defeated favourites Arsenal 2–1 in the 2011 Football League Cup Final, thus earning qualification for the Europa League. In the absence of several midfielders through injury, Ridgewell played in the play-off round first leg against Portuguese club Nacional, Birmingham's first participation in major European competition for nearly 50 years, in an unfamiliar holding midfield position. As the August 2011 transfer deadline approached, Ridgewell submitted a transfer request which was rejected by the club, and despite late interest from Premier League clubs including Newcastle United, he remained with Birmingham.

=== West Bromwich Albion ===
Ridgewell signed a two-and-a-half-year contract with Premier League club West Bromwich Albion on 31 January 2012. The transfer fee was undisclosed. On 12 February, he made his debut in a 5–1 away win over Wolverhampton Wanderers. He made his home debut a week later as West Brom beat Sunderland 4–0 at The Hawthorns. He scored his first goal for West Brom on 7 April in a 3–0 home win against Blackburn Rovers.

On 16 May 2014, West Bromwich Albion announced that they would not take up the option of extending Ridgewell's contract and he was released from the club.

=== Portland Timbers ===
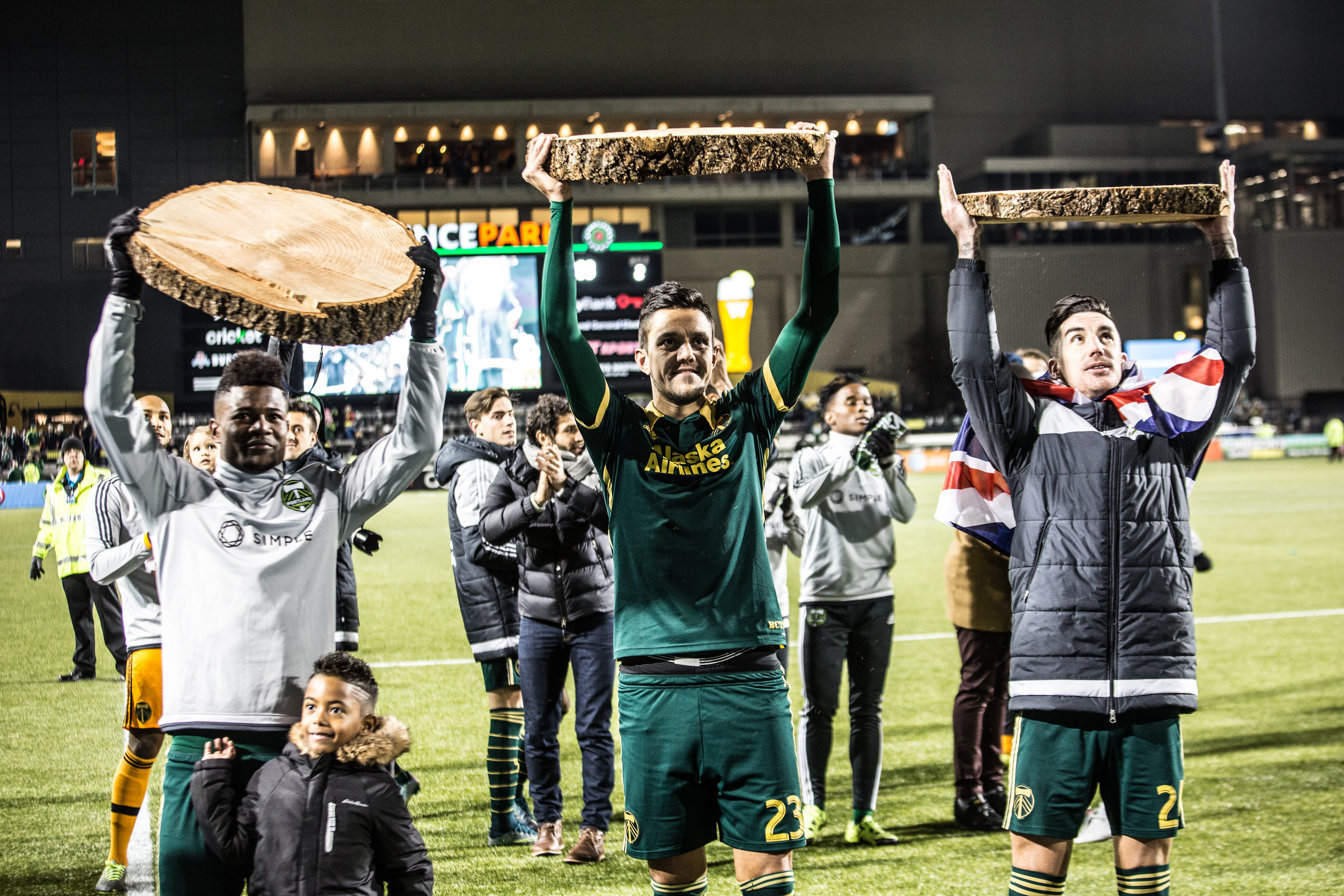
Ridgewell (right, wearing the British flag) celebrating the Timbers' victory over FC Dallas in the 2015 MLS Cup Playoffs.

Ridgewell was signed as a Designated Player for the Portland Timbers of Major League Soccer on 25 June 2014. He made his MLS debut on 18 July, the 62nd consecutive sellout at Providence Park, and a comeback 2–1 victory over the visiting Colorado Rapids. Ridgewell was named in the MLS All-Star team for the 2014 MLS All-Star Game against Bayern Munich as a replacement for the injured Kyle Beckerman. He scored his first Timbers goal, the equaliser against the New England Revolution on 16 August 2014, after a 45-yard (41 m) solo run.

On 8 January 2015, Ridgewell signed for Wigan Athletic on a six-week loan deal. He made six appearances for the Latics, who ended the season with relegation from the Championship.

Ridgewell was sent off on 25 June 2015 in a 5–0 loss at LA Galaxy, for a kick at Alan Gordon. The Timbers qualified for the 2015 MLS Cup Playoffs, in which Ridgewell opened the scoring in a 3–1 first leg win over Western Conference regular season champions FC Dallas on 22 November, as the team eventually reached MLS Cup 2015. In the decisive match on 6 December away to the Columbus Crew at Mapfre Stadium, he captained the Timbers to a 2–1 win.

In December 2015, Ridgewell agreed a short-term loan with Championship team Brighton & Hove Albion, to begin when the transfer window opened on 2 January 2016 and end in time for the second half of the Timbers' preseason. He finished his spell with four wins from five league appearances.

Ridgewell was sent off on 30 September 2018 at the end of a goalless draw at home to FC Dallas for a foul on Roland Lamah. The Timbers made the 2018 MLS Cup Playoffs; in the Western Conference semi-finals they defeated rivals Seattle Sounders FC on penalties. The Timbers lost the MLS Cup 2018 2–0 at Atlanta United FC in Ridgewell's final game.

On 10 January 2019, Ridgewell and Portland mutually agreed to part ways.

=== Return to England ===
On 31 January 2019, Ridgewell joined Hull City for the remainder of the 2018–19 season. He made his debut on 9 February in a 2–0 loss at Derby County, as a 75th-minute substitute for Stephen Kingsley. He was released by Hull City at the end of the 2018–19 season.

On 9 August 2019, Ridgewell signed a one-year deal with EFL League One club Southend United, with the option of a second. He made his debut the next day in the season opener, a 3–1 home loss to Blackpool, starting on the left of a three-man defence and being replaced by Layton Ndukwu after 52 minutes. Manager Kevin Bond said his decision may have been "unfair" to start Ridgewell after he had not played any friendlies in the summer. He left Southend on 31 January 2020, having played no further part.
On 22 May 2020, Ridgewell joined amateur side Sutton Rangers in the Sutton and District Sunday League.

== Coaching career ==
Ridgewell took on his first coaching job in December 2020, when he joined National League club Dover Athletic in the role of a first-team coach, assisting the manager Andy Hessenthaler. Ridgewell joined the Portland Timbers coaching staff for the 2023 season. He holds a UEFA B Coaching License.

== Personal life ==
In October 2016, Ridgewell and Portland Timbers teammate Jake Gleeson were arrested and charged with driving under the influence and refusing breathalyzer tests in Lake Oswego, Oregon. The case against Ridgewell was dropped in January 2017 when a judge ruled that the police had insufficient cause to stop and test him, while Gleeson pleaded no contest to his charges.

Ridgewell co-owns custom swimwear company Thomas Royall with fellow footballers Sam Saunders and John Terry.

== Career statistics ==
As of match played 15 May 2021

Appearances and goals by club, season and competition
Club	Season	League			National Cup		League Cup		Other		Total	
Club	Season	Division	Apps	Goals	Apps	Goals	Apps	Goals	Apps	Goals	Apps	Goals
Aston Villa	2002–03	Premier League	0	0	1	0	0	0	0	0	1	0
Aston Villa	2003–04	Premier League	11	0	0	0	2	0	―		13	0
Aston Villa	2004–05	Premier League	15	1	1	0	1	0	―		17	1
Aston Villa	2005–06	Premier League	32	5	2	0	3	0	―		37	5
Aston Villa	2006–07	Premier League	21	1	1	0	3	0	―		25	1
Aston Villa	Total		79	7	5	0	9	0	0	0	93	7
AFC Bournemouth (loan)	2002–03	Third Division	5	0	―		―		―		5	0
Birmingham City	2007–08	Premier League	35	1	1	0	1	0	―		37	1
Birmingham City	2008–09	Championship	36	1	1	0	2	0	―		39	1
Birmingham City	2009–10	Premier League	31	3	5	1	1	0	―		37	4
Birmingham City	2010–11	Premier League	36	4	2	0	5	1	―		43	5
Birmingham City	2011–12	Championship	14	0	1	0	0	0	4 (Note: Appearances in Europa League)	0	19	0
Birmingham City	Total		152	9	10	1	9	1	4	0	175	11
West Bromwich Albion	2011–12	Premier League	13	1	―		―		―		13	1
West Bromwich Albion	2012–13	Premier League	30	0	1	0	1	0	―		32	0
West Bromwich Albion	2013–14	Premier League	33	1	0	0	0	0	―		33	1
West Bromwich Albion	Total		76	2	1	0	1	0	―		78	2
Portland Timbers	2014	Major League Soccer	15	2	0	0	―		1 (Note: Appearance in CONCACAF Champions League)	0	16	2
Portland Timbers	2015	Major League Soccer	32	0	1	0	―		5 (Note: Appearances in 2015 MLS Cup Playoffs)	1	38	1
Portland Timbers	Total		47	2	1	0	―		6	1	54	3
Wigan Athletic (loan)	2014–15	Championship	6	0	―		―		―		6	0
Brighton & Hove Albion (loan)	2015–16	Championship	5	0	1	0	―		―		6	0
Hull City	2018–19	Championship	7	0	0	0	―		―		7	0
Southend United	2019–20	League One	1	0	0	0	―		―		1	0
Career total			378	20	18	1	19	1	10	1	425	23

== Honours ==
Aston Villa

- FA Youth Cup: 2001–02

Birmingham City

- Football League Cup: 2010–11

Portland Timbers

- MLS Cup: 2015
- Western Conference (playoffs): 2015

Individual

- MLS All-Star: 2014
