= Cameron Gayle =

English footballer (born 1992)

Personal information
- Full name: Cameron Gordon Gayle
- Date of birth: 22 November 1992 (age 33)
- Place of birth: Birmingham, England
- Height: 1.80 m (5 ft 11 in)
- Position: Defender

Team information
- Current team: Sutton Coldfield Town

Youth career
- –2011: West Bromwich Albion

Senior career*
Years	Team	Apps	(Gls)
2011–2014	West Bromwich Albion	0	(0)
2011	→ Víkingur Reykjavík (loan)	1	(0)
2012–2013	→ Shrewsbury Town (loan)	18	(1)
2013–2014	→ Shrewsbury Town (loan)	3	(0)
2014–2015	Shrewsbury Town	28	(0)
2015–2016	Oxford United	0	(0)
2015	→ Cambridge United (loan)	4	(1)
2016	Sutton Coldfield Town		
2016	Rushall Olympic		
2016–	Sutton Coldfield Town		
- * Club domestic league appearances and goals as of 19:32, 6 November 2016 (UTC)

Cameron Gordon Gayle (born 22 November 1992) is an English footballer who plays as a defender for Sutton Coldfield Town.

== Career ==
=== West Bromwich Albion ===
Gayle was born in Birmingham and began his career with West Bromwich Albion. In July 2009, Gayle was among eleven academy youngsters to sign scholarships with the club.

He spent a month on loan at Knattspyrnufélagið Víkingur in Iceland in May 2011, where he made one substitute appearance. In May 2012, Gayle signed his first professional contract with West Brom. Ahead of the 2012–13 season, Gayle was allocated the number forty-one shirt.

After his first loan spell at Shrewsbury Town came to an end, Gayle's contract with West Brom was extended for another season after the club decided to take up the option on his contract. On 27 August 2013, he made his only appearance for the senior Albion team, against Newport County in the League Cup, coming on as a 70th-minute substitute.

At the end of the 2013–14 season, Gayle was released by the club.

=== Shrewsbury Town ===
On 22 November 2012, Gayle joined Shrewsbury Town on loan, making his debut two days later in a 1–0 loss away to Oldham Athletic. In January 2013 his loan spell at Shrewsbury was extended until the end of the 2012–13 season. He scored his first senior goal in a 2–0 victory over Tranmere Rovers at Prenton Park in February, however, he suffered a hamstring injury during a match against Crewe the following month. After returning to training to regain his fitness, Gayle made his first appearance for the club since returning from injury, against Colchester United. The match finished 0–0, which secured Shrewsbury's place in League One for another season.

On 28 November 2013, Gayle signed for Shrewsbury Town for a second loan spell, but this was not extended beyond its initial period with the good form of Ryan Woods restricting Gayle to just two starts and one substitute appearance before he returned to his parent club in January 2014.

Following his release from West Bromwich Albion, Gayle joined Shrewsbury on a permanent basis, signing a two-year deal on 10 July 2014. He started the season as first choice right back under new manager Micky Mellon, however a change in formation saw loanees Jack Grimmer, and later Josh Passley favoured instead. However, he was recalled to the side for a televised away match at Luton Town in January 2015, earning praise from his manager for a "sensational" performance.

Following Shrewsbury's promotion to League One, Gayle's contract was cancelled by mutual consent on 30 June 2015, despite having a year left to run.

=== Oxford United ===
Gayle joined Oxford United on an initial one-month deal in November 2015, having previously been coached by manager Michael Appleton as a youngster at West Bromwich Albion. He made his Oxford debut in an FA Cup first-round tie away at Braintree Town.

After making two cup appearances, Gayle extended his deal with Oxford for a further two months, to be spent on loan at Cambridge United. He scored on his Cambridge debut in a 4–2 away win over Morecambe.

=== Non-League ===
After returning from his loan at Cambridge, Gayle moved on to non-league Sutton Coldfield Town in February 2016. He transferred to Rushall Olympic ahead of the 2016–17 season, before returning to Sutton Coldfield in September 2016.

== Style of play ==
Gayle can play in either full back position, or at centre back, but was mostly used at Shrewsbury as a right back. Following his permanent transfer to the club, manager Micky Mellon noted his strengths as being his athletic and technical ability, as well as his versatility.

== Career statistics ==
As of 13 December 2015.

Appearances and goals by club, season and competition
Club	Season	League			FA Cup		League Cup		Other		Total	
Club	Season	Division	Apps	Goals	Apps	Goals	Apps	Goals	Apps	Goals	Apps	Goals
West Bromwich Albion	2013–14	Premier League	0	0	0	0	1	0	0	0	1	0
Shrewsbury Town (loan)	2012–13	League One	18	1	−		−		0	0	18	1
Shrewsbury Town (loan)	2013–14	League One	3	0	−		−		0	0	3	0
Shrewsbury Town	2014–15	League Two	28	0	1	0	3	0	1 (Note: Appearance(s) in Football League Trophy)	0	33	0
Shrewsbury Town	Total		49	1	1	0	3	0	1	0	54	1
Oxford United	2015–16	League Two	0	0	1	0	−		1	0	2	0
Cambridge United (loan)	2015–16	League Two	3	1	−		−		0	0	3	1
Career Total			52	2	2	0	4	0	2	0	60	2

== Honours ==
Shrewsbury Town

- League Two runner-up, second-place promotion: 2014–15
