= Callam Mendez-Jones =

English footballer

Personal information
- Date of birth: 31 January 1996 (age 30)
- Place of birth: West Bromwich, England
- Height: 1.83 m (6 ft 0 in)
- Position: Defender

Team information
- Current team: Redditch United

Youth career
- –2014: West Bromwich Albion

Senior career*
Years	Team	Apps	(Gls)
2014–2017	West Bromwich Albion	0	(0)
2016–2017	→ Accrington Stanley (loan)	2	(0)
2017–2018	Hednesford Town	19	(0)
2018–2019	Halesowen Town		
2019	Rushall Olympic	5	(0)
2019	Redditch United	1	(0)
2019–2020	Buxton		
2020–2022	Hednesford Town	19	(0)
2021	→ Sutton Coldfield Town (loan)	2	(0)
2023–2024	Hednesford Town	10	(0)
2024–	Chasetown	0	(0)
- * Club domestic league appearances and goals as of 13:54, 28 March 2024 (UTC)

Callam Mendez-Jones (born 31 January 1996) is an English footballer who plays for Northern Premier League Division One West side Chasetown, where he plays as a defender.

== Playing career ==
=== Accrington Stanley ===
In June 2016 he joined Accrington Stanley on a 6-month loan. He was named on the bench on the opening game of the season against Doncaster Rovers, making his debut in the same game coming off the bench for Janoi Donacien in the 79th minute.

Mendez-Jones was released from the club on 30 June 2017.

=== Non-League career ===
Mendez-Jones signed for Hednesford Town in November 2017.

During pre-season of the 2019–20 season, Callam signed for Rushall Olympic, but it was only in September 2019 that he was able to make his debut, due to an MCL injury.

Mendez-Jones signed for Redditch United on 21 November 2019.

In June 2023, Mendez-Jones returned to Hednesford Town. He joined Northern Premier League Division One West club Chasetown in March 2024.
