= 2015–16 West Bromwich Albion F.C. season =

West Bromwich Albion
2015–16 season
- Chairman: Jeremy Peace
- Manager: Tony Pulis
- Stadium: The Hawthorns
- Premier League: 14th
- FA Cup: Fifth round
- League Cup: Third round
- Top goalscorer: League: Salomón Rondón (9); All: Salomón Rondón (10)
- Average home league attendance: 24,631
Home colours	Away colours

The 2015–16 season was West Bromwich Albion's sixth consecutive season in the Premier League and their 138th year in existence. This season West Bromwich Albion participated in the Premier League, FA Cup and League Cup. The season covered the period from 1 July 2015 to 30 June 2016.

== Background ==
The writers of the Birmingham Mail forecast that Albion would finish somewhere between 10th and 16th, the average of all their predictions being 13th place. The Guardian also forecast a 13th-place finish for Albion, predicting that Tony Pulis would "be able to drive his side to safety" in his first full season in charge.

The club created a "fanzone", in which up to 2,000 supporters could gather before and after home matches. The fanzone is based in the vicinity of the 19th century Grade Two listed Hawthorns pub, adjacent to Albion's home ground, The Hawthorns. In order to facilitate this, the wings of the pub building were demolished and the central structure renovated inside and out. The work was initially delayed due to the discovery of horsehair in the building's plaster, which needed to be tested for anthrax spores. Work resumed once the tests came back negative.

== Players ==
=== First-team squad ===
Squad at end of season

Note: Flags indicate national team as defined under FIFA eligibility rules; some limited exceptions apply. Players may hold more than one non-FIFA nationality.

No.	Pos.	Nation	Player
1	GK	ENG	Ben Foster
3	DF	SWE	Jonas Olsson
4	DF	WAL	James Chester (Note: Chester was born in Warrington, England, but also qualified to represent Wales internationally through his mother and made his international debut for Wales in June 2014.)
5	MF	ARG	Claudio Yacob
6	DF	NIR	Jonny Evans
7	MF	SCO	James Morrison (Note: Morrison was born in Darlington, England, and represented them at U-17, U-18, U-19, and U-21 level, but also qualified to represent Scotland internationally through his grandparents and made his international debut for Scotland in May 2008.)
8	MF	ENG	Craig Gardner
10	FW	NGR	Victor Anichebe
11	MF	NIR	Chris Brunt
13	GK	WAL	Boaz Myhill (Note: Myhill was born in Modesto, California, United States, but was raised in England from the age of 1, qualifying to represent any of the home nations. He represented England at U-17, U-18, and U-20 level before making his international debut for Wales in March 2008.)
14	MF	IRL	James McClean (Note: McClean was born in Derry, Northern Ireland, and represented them at U-21 level, but also qualified to represent the Republic of Ireland internationally and made his international debut for the Republic of Ireland in February 2012.)
15	DF	BEL	Sébastien Pocognoli
16	DF	CRC	Cristian Gamboa
17	FW	ENG	Rickie Lambert
18	FW	ENG	Saido Berahino (Note: Berahino was born in Bujumbura, Burundi, but was raised in England from the age of 10 and represented them at every youth level between U-16 and U-21 level before making his international debut for Burundi in September 2018.)
19	MF	ENG	Callum McManaman

No.	Pos.	Nation	Player
20	MF	ENG	Alex Pritchard (on loan from Tottenham Hotspur)
23	DF	NIR	Gareth McAuley
24	MF	SCO	Darren Fletcher (Captain)
25	DF	ENG	Craig Dawson
29	MF	BEN	Stéphane Sessègnon
30	MF	BRA	Sandro (on loan from Queens Park Rangers)
33	FW	VEN	Salomón Rondón
38	GK	ENG	Jack Rose
40	GK	ENG	Alex Palmer
41	MF	ENG	Joe Ward
42	FW	ENG	Kyle Edwards
43	DF	ENG	Callam Jones
44	FW	WAL	Tyler Roberts (Note: Roberts was born in Gloucester, England, but also qualified to represent Wales internationally through two grandparents and represented them at every youth level between U-17 and U-21 level before making his international debut for Wales in September 2018.)
45	FW	ENG	Jonathan Leko (Note: Leko was born in Kinshasa, Democratic Republic of the Congo, but was raised in England from the age of 8 and has represented them at every youth level between U-16 and U-19 level.)
46	DF	IRL	Shaun Donnellan (Note: Donnellan was born in Barnet, England, but also qualified to represent the Republic of Ireland internationally through his father and represented them at U-19 and U-21 level.)
47	MF	ENG	Sam Field

=== Left club during season ===
Note: Flags indicate national team as defined under FIFA eligibility rules; some limited exceptions apply. Players may hold more than one non-FIFA nationality.

No.	Pos.	Nation	Player
6	DF	ENG	Joleon Lescott (to Aston Villa)
9	FW	NGR	Brown Ideye (to Olympiakos)
20	DF	ENG	Liam O'Neil (to Chesterfield)

No.	Pos.	Nation	Player
21	GK	DEN	Anders Lindegaard (on loan to Preston North End)
31	MF	GER	Serge Gnabry (on loan from Arsenal)
36	MF	ENG	Adil Nabi (to Peterborough United)

== Statistics ==
=== Appearances and goals ===
No.	Pos	Nat	Player	Total		Premier League		FA Cup		League Cup	
No.	Pos	Nat	Player	Apps	Goals	Apps	Goals	Apps	Goals	Apps	Goals
Goalkeepers
1	GK	(England) ENG	Ben Foster	19	0	15	0	4	0	0	0
13	GK	(Wales) WAL	Boaz Myhill	25	0	23	0	1	0	1	0
Defenders
3	DF	(Sweden) SWE	Jonas Olsson	32	1	25+3	1	2	0	2	0
4	DF	(Wales) WAL	James Chester	19	0	9+4	0	3+1	0	2	0
6	DF	(Northern Ireland) NIR	Jonny Evans	34	1	30	1	4	0	0	0
15	DF	(Belgium) BEL	Sébastien Pocognoli	5	0	0+1	0	1+2	0	1	0
16	DF	(Costa Rica) CRC	Cristian Gamboa	3	0	0+1	0	1	0	1	0
23	DF	(Northern Ireland) NIR	Gareth McAuley	39	1	34	1	4	0	1	0
25	DF	(England) ENG	Craig Dawson	43	4	38	4	2+1	0	1+1	0
Midfielders
5	MF	(Argentina) ARG	Claudio Yacob	37	1	33	1	3	0	1	0
7	MF	(Scotland) SCO	James Morrison	19	4	17+1	3	1	1	0	0
8	MF	(England) ENG	Craig Gardner	38	3	20+14	3	3	0	1	0
11	MF	(Northern Ireland) NIR	Chris Brunt	26	0	20+2	0	3	0	1	0
14	MF	(Republic of Ireland) IRL	James McClean	42	2	28+7	2	5	0	1+1	0
19	MF	(England) ENG	Callum McManaman	15	0	2+10	0	0+1	0	0+2	0
20	MF	(England) ENG	Alex Pritchard	3	0	0+2	0	0+1	0	0	0
24	MF	(Scotland) SCO	Darren Fletcher	42	3	38	1	3	2	1	0
29	MF	(Benin) BEN	Stephane Sessegnon	31	2	21+4	2	4+1	0	1	0
30	MF	(Brazil) BRA	Sandro	13	0	5+7	0	1	0	0	0
47	MF	(England) ENG	Sam Field	1	0	0+1	0	0	0	0	0
Forwards
10	FW	(Nigeria) NGR	Victor Anichebe	14	0	3+7	0	1+2	0	1	0
17	FW	(England) ENG	Rickie Lambert	24	1	5+14	1	2+1	0	2	0
18	FW	(England) ENG	Saido Berahino	35	7	17+14	4	3+1	3	0	0
33	FW	(Venezuela) VEN	Salomón Rondón	40	10	30+4	9	4+1	1	0+1	0
44	FW	(Wales) WAL	Tyler Roberts	1	0	0+1	0	0	0	0	0
45	FW	(England) ENG	Jonathan Leko	6	0	3+2	0	0	0	0+1	0
Players transferred out during the season
6	DF	(England) ENG	Joleon Lescott	2	0	2	0	0	0	0	0
9	FW	(Nigeria) NGR	Brown Ideye	1	0	0	0	0	0	0+1	0
21	GK	(Denmark) DEN	Anders Lindegaard	1	0	0	0	0	0	1	0
31	MF	(Germany) GER	Serge Gnabry	3	0	0+1	0	0	0	2	0

Last updated: 15 May 2016
Source: Competitions

== Transfers ==
=== Transfers in ===
Date from	Position	Nationality	Name	From	Fee	Ref.
1 July 2015	LW	IRE	James McClean	Wigan Athletic	£1,500,000	
29 July 2015	CB	WAL	James Chester	Hull City	£8,000,000	
31 July 2015	ST	ENG	Rickie Lambert	Liverpool	£3,000,000	
10 August 2015	CF	VEN	Salomón Rondón	Zenit Saint Petersburg	£12,000,000	
29 August 2015	CB	NIR	Jonny Evans	Manchester United	£6,000,000	
31 August 2015	GK	DEN	Anders Lindegaard	Manchester United	Free	

Total outgoing: ▼£30,500,000

=== Transfers out ===
Date from	Position	Nationality	Name	To	Fee	Ref.
1 July 2015	RB	ENG	Wes Atkinson	Notts County (Note: Following Atkinson's release he joined Notts County.)	Free transfer	
1 July 2015	DM	NIR	Chris Baird	Derby County (Note: Following Baird's release he joined Derby County.)	Free transfer	
1 July 2015	CB	MSR	Donervon Daniels	Wigan Athletic	Undisclosed	
1 July 2015	LB	AUS	Jason Davidson	Huddersfield Town (Note: Following Davidson's release he joined Huddersfield Town.)	Free transfer	
1 July 2015	RM	SCO	Graham Dorrans	Norwich City	£3,000,000	
1 July 2015	LB	IRL	Bradley Garmston	Gillingham (Note: Following Garmston's release ohe joined Gillingham.)	Free transfer	
1 July 2015	MF	ENG	Alex Jones	Birmingham City	Free transfer	
1 July 2015	DM	COD	Youssuf Mulumbu	Norwich City	Free transfer	
1 July 2015	CM	ENG	Mani O'Sullivan	Free agent	Released	
1 July 2015	AM	ENG	Kemar Roofe	Oxford United	Undisclosed	
17 July 2015	LW	GRE	Georgios Samaras	Free agent	Released	
24 August 2015	DM	ENG	Liam O'Neil	Chesterfield	Undisclosed	
31 August 2015	CF	NGA	Brown Ideye	Olympiacos	Undisclosed	
1 September 2015	CB	ENG	Joleon Lescott	Aston Villa	Undisclosed	
21 January 2016	CF	ENG	Adil Nabi	Peterborough United	Undisclosed	

Total incoming: ▲£3,000,000

=== Loans in ===
Date from	Position	Nationality	Name	From	Date until	Ref.
1 July 2015	RW	GER	Serge Gnabry	Arsenal	31 January 2016	
29 January 2016	DM	Brazil	Sandro	Queens Park Rangers	End of season	
1 February 2016	AM	ENG	Alex Pritchard	Tottenham Hotspur	End of season	

=== Loans out ===
Date from	Position	Nationality	Name	To	Date until	Ref.
24 June 2015	GK	ENG	Alex Palmer	Kidderminster Harriers	2 January 2016	
5 August 2015	CF	ENG	Andre Wright	Kidderminster Harriers	2 January 2016	
7 August 2015	LW	ENG	Tahvon Campbell	Kidderminster Harriers	22 October 2015	
28 August 2015	CF	ENG	Adil Nabi	Delhi Dynamos	15 December 2015	
11 September 2015	CB	ENG	Jack Fitzwater	Chesterfield	9 October 2015	
2 January 2016	LW	ENG	Tahvon Campbell	Yeovil Town	2 February 2016	
23 January 2016	GK	DEN	Anders Lindegaard	Preston North End	End of season	
23 March 2016	GK	ENG	Jack Rose	Crawley Town	End of season	

== Pre-season ==
On 1 May 2015, it was announced that West Bromwich Albion would face Walsall in a pre-season friendly on 28 July 2015. Also announced was that West Bromwich Albion will go on tour to the United States and face Orlando City, Charleston Battery and Richmond Kickers. On 12 May 2015, it was announced that a West Bromwich Albion XI side will travel to Forest Green Rovers on 28 July 2015. On 7 July 2015, West Bromwich Albion announced a friendly fixture against Swindon Town.

8 July 2015 Friendly	Red Bull Salzburg	3–1	West Bromwich Albion	Schladming, Austria
18:00 CEST	Djuricin 33'; Soriano 39'; Minamino 65'	Report	Nabi 67'	Stadium: Athletic Arena

15 July 2015 Friendly	Orlando City	3–1	West Bromwich Albion	Orlando, United States
7:30 p.m. EDT	Kaká 45'; Rivas 49'; Rochez 87'	Report	McManaman 14'	Stadium: Citrus Bowl; Attendance: 15,172

17 July 2015 Friendly	Charleston Battery	1–2	West Bromwich Albion	Charleston, United States
7:30 p.m. EDT	Boyd 57'	Report	Berahino 42'; Ideye 82'	Stadium: Blackbaud Stadium

19 July 2015 Friendly	Richmond Kickers	1–2	West Bromwich Albion	Richmond, United States
17:30 EDT	Shiffman 84'		McClean 14'; Ideye 88'	Stadium: City Stadium

25 July 2015 Friendly	Swindon Town	1–4	West Bromwich Albion	Swindon
15:00 BST	Kasim 32'	Report	Morrison 8' (?); Anichebe 23'; Sessègnon 82'	Stadium: County Ground

28 July 2015 Friendly	Walsall	0–2	West Bromwich Albion	Walsall
19:30 BST		Report	Berahino 62'; Ideye 83'	Stadium: Bescot Stadium

28 July 2015 Friendly	Forest Green Rovers	1–0	West Bromwich Albion XI	Nailsworth
19:30 BST				Stadium: The New Lawn

== Premier League ==
For the club's final home match of the season, against Liverpool, West Bromwich Albion temporarily installed 96 red seats in the away end of The Hawthorns. Each seat featured the name of one of the victims of the Hillsborough disaster and remained unoccupied throughout the match.

=== League table ===
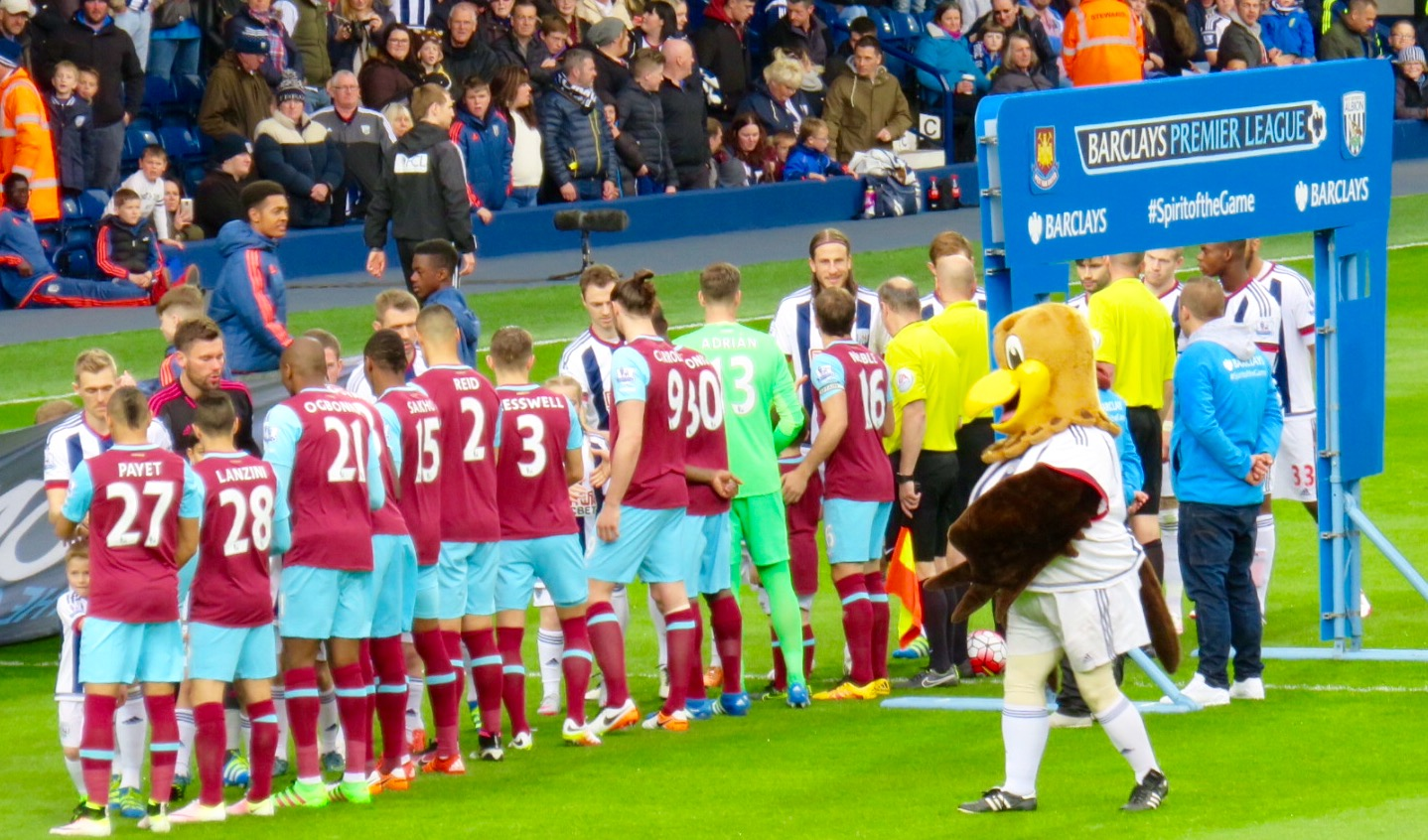
The Albion team prepares to face West Ham United at The Hawthorns.

Pos	Team	Pld	W	D	L	GF	GA	GD	Pts
12	Swansea City	38	12	11	15	42	52	−10	47
13	Watford	38	12	9	17	40	50	−10	45
14	West Bromwich Albion	38	10	13	15	34	48	−14	43
15	Crystal Palace	38	11	9	18	39	51	−12	42
16	Bournemouth	38	11	9	18	45	67	−22	42

Source: Barclays Premier League
Rules for classification: 1) Points; 2) Goal difference; 3) Goals scored; 4) Play-offs (only if needed to decide champion, teams for relegation or teams for UEFA competitions).

=== Results summary ===
Overall								Home						Away					
Pld	W	D	L	GF	GA	GD	Pts	W	D	L	GF	GA	GD	W	D	L	GF	GA	GD
38	10	13	15	34	48	−14	43	6	5	8	20	26	−6	4	8	7	14	22	−8

Last updated: 15 May 2016.

=== Results by matchday ===
Matchday	1	2	3	4	5	6	7	8	9	10	11	12	13	14	15	16	17	18	19	20	21	22	23	24	25	26	27	28	29	30	31	32	33	34	35	36	37	38
Ground	H	A	H	A	H	A	H	A	H	A	H	A	H	A	H	A	H	A	H	H	A	A	H	H	A	A	H	A	H	A	H	A	A	H	A	H	A	H
Result	L	D	L	W	D	W	L	L	W	W	L	L	W	D	D	D	L	L	W	W	D	L	D	D	L	W	W	D	W	L	L	D	L	L	D	L	D	D
Position	20	17	20	14	13	10	15	17	12	8	12	14	13	13	13	13	13	13	13	12	13	13	14	14	14	14	14	13	11	15	11	11	13	15	13	13	15	14

Updated to match(es) played on 15 May 2016. Source:
A = Away; H = Home; W = Win; D = Draw; L = Loss

=== Matches ===
On 17 June 2015, the fixtures for the forthcoming season were announced.

10 August 2015 1	West Bromwich Albion	0–3	Manchester City	West Bromwich
20:00 BST	Fletcher (yellow card) 39'; Gardner (yellow card) 57'; Chester (yellow card) 58'; Yacob (yellow card) 62'	Report	Silva 9'; Touré 24'; Fernandinho (yellow card) 51'; Kompany 59'	Stadium: The Hawthorns; Attendance: 24,564 (2,600 away); Referee: Mike Dean

15 August 2015 2	Watford	0–0	West Bromwich Albion	Watford
15:00 BST	Nyom (yellow card) 90+1'	Report	Olsson (yellow card) 31'; Lambert (yellow card) 66'	Stadium: Vicarage Road; Attendance: 20,011 (2,184 away); Referee: Paul Tierney

23 August 2015 3	West Bromwich Albion	2–3	Chelsea	West Bromwich
13:30 BST	Morrison (penalty missed) 14', 35', 59'; McClean (yellow card) 37'; McManaman (yellow card) 71'	Report	Matić (yellow card) 17'; Pedro 20'; Costa 30'; Azpilicueta 42'; Terry (red card) 54'	Stadium: The Hawthorns; Attendance: 23,256 (2,599 away); Referee: Mark Clattenburg

29 August 2015 4	Stoke City	0–1	West Bromwich Albion	Stoke-on-Trent
15:00 BST	Afellay (red card) 25'; Adam (red card) 31'; Pieters (yellow card) 66'		Gardner (yellow card) 25'; Rondón 45+3'; McAuley (yellow card) 84'	Stadium: Britannia Stadium; Attendance: 26,747 (2,046 away); Referee: Michael Oliver

12 September 2015 5	West Bromwich Albion	0–0	Southampton	West Bromwich
15:00 BST		Report		Stadium: The Hawthorns; Attendance: 24,265 (2,600 away); Referee: Stuart Attwell

19 September 2015 6	Aston Villa	0–1	West Bromwich Albion	Birmingham
15:00 BST		Report	Berahino 39'	Stadium: Villa Park; Attendance: 36,321 (2,800 away); Referee: Martin Atkinson

28 September 2015 7	West Bromwich Albion	2–3	Everton	West Bromwich
20:00 BST	Berahino 41'; Dawson 54'	Report	Lukaku 55', 84'; Koné 75'	Stadium: The Hawthorns; Attendance: 24,240 (2,600 away); Referee: Robert Madley

3 October 2015 8	Crystal Palace	2–0	West Bromwich Albion	Selhurst
12:45 BST	Bolasie 68'; Cabaye 89' (pen.)	Report		Stadium: Selhurst Park; Attendance: 24,033 (1,388 away); Referee: Jonathan Moss

17 October 2015 9	West Bromwich Albion	1–0	Sunderland	West Bromwich
15:00 BST	Dawson (yellow card) 9'; Berahino 54'; Yacob (yellow card) 56'	Report	Pantilimon (yellow card) 55'; Borini (yellow card) 84'	Stadium: The Hawthorns; Attendance: 24,225 (2,596 away); Referee: Martin Atkinson

24 October 2015 10	Norwich City	0–1	West Bromwich Albion	Norwich
15:00 BST	Howson (yellow card) 22'	Report	Rondón 47'; Brunt (yellow card) 72'; McClean (yellow card) 78'	Stadium: Carrow Road; Attendance: 26,983; Referee: Kevin Friend

31 October 2015 11	West Bromwich Albion	2–3	Leicester City	West Bromwich
15:00 GMT	Rondón 30'; Lambert 84' (pen.)	Report	Mahrez 57', 64'; Vardy 77'	Stadium: The Hawthorns; Attendance: 24,150 (2,600 away); Referee: Anthony Taylor

7 November 2015 12	Manchester United	2–0	West Bromwich Albion	Manchester
15:00 GMT	Lingard 52'; Mata 90' (pen.)	Report	McAuley (red card) 90+1'	Stadium: Old Trafford; Attendance: 75,410 (1,300 away); Referee: Mike Dean

21 November 2015 13	West Bromwich Albion	2–1	Arsenal	West Bromwich
15:00 GMT	Morrison 35'; Arteta 40' (o.g.)	Report	Giroud 28'; Cazorla (penalty missed) 84'	Stadium: The Hawthorns; Attendance: 24,343 (2,598 away); Referee: Mark Clattenburg

29 November 2015 14	West Ham United	1–1	West Bromwich Albion	London
15:00 GMT	Zárate 17'	Report	Reid 50' (o.g.)	Stadium: Boleyn Ground; Attendance: 34,914; Referee: Martin Atkinson

5 December 2015 15	West Bromwich Albion	1–1	Tottenham Hotspur	West Bromwich
15:00 GMT	McClean 39', (yellow card) 83'; Morrison (yellow card) 57'; Gardner (yellow card) 73'	Report	Alli 15'; Kane (yellow card) 75'; Dembélé (yellow card) 81'	Stadium: The Hawthorns; Attendance: 23,602 (2,600 away); Referee: Jonathan Moss

13 December 2015 16	Liverpool	2–2	West Bromwich Albion	Liverpool
16:00 GMT	Henderson 21'; Origi 90'	Report	Dawson 30'; Olsson 73'	Stadium: Anfield; Attendance: 44,147; Referee: Craig Pawson

19 December 2015 17	West Bromwich Albion	1–2	Bournemouth	West Bromwich
15:00 GMT	McClean (red card) 34'; Evans (yellow card) 39'; Fletcher (yellow card) 64'; McAuley 79'; Rondón (red card) 90'	Report	Smith 52', (yellow card) 90'; Daniels 87' (pen.)	Stadium: The Hawthorns; Attendance: 26,127 (2,588 away); Referee: Mike Dean

26 December 2015 18	Swansea City	1–0	West Bromwich Albion	Swansea
15:00 GMT	Ki 9'	Report		Stadium: Liberty Stadium; Attendance: 20,789; Referee: Roger East

28 December 2015 19	West Bromwich Albion	1–0	Newcastle United	West Bromwich
15:00 GMT	Fletcher 78'	Report		Stadium: The Hawthorns; Attendance: 26,313 (2,600 away); Referee: Mike Jones

2 January 2016 20	West Bromwich Albion	2–1	Stoke City	West Bromwich
15:00 GMT	Sessègnon 60'; Evans 90+2'	Report	Walters 81'; Cameron (red card) 83'	Stadium: The Hawthorns; Attendance: 23,218 (2,600 away); Referee: Lee Mason

13 January 2016 21	Chelsea	2–2	West Bromwich Albion	London
19:45 GMT	Azpilicueta 20'; McAuley 73' (o.g.)	Report	Gardner 33'; McClean 86'	Stadium: Stamford Bridge; Attendance: 40,945 (849 away); Referee: Anthony Taylor

16 January 2016 22	Southampton	3–0	West Bromwich Albion	Southampton
15:00 GMT	Ward-Prowse 5', 35' (pen.); Tadić 72'	Report		Stadium: St Mary's Stadium; Attendance: 29,622 (1,553 away); Referee: Martin Atkinson

23 January 2016 23	West Bromwich Albion	0–0	Aston Villa	West Bromwich
15:00 GMT		Report	Richards (yellow card) 41'	Stadium: The Hawthorns; Attendance: 26,165 (2,600 away); Referee: Robert Madley

2 February 2016 24	West Bromwich Albion	1–1	Swansea City	West Bromwich
20:00 GMT	Rondón 90+2'	Report	Sigurðsson 64'	Stadium: The Hawthorns; Attendance: 22,062 (1,396 away); Referee: Neil Swarbrick

6 February 2016 25	Newcastle United	1–0	West Bromwich Albion	Newcastle upon Tyne
15:00 GMT	Mitrović 32'	Report	McAuley (yellow card) 47'; Chester (yellow card) 63'; Olsson (yellow card) 83'	Stadium: St James' Park; Attendance: 50,152 (1,531 away); Referee: Lee Mason

13 February 2016 26	Everton	0–1	West Bromwich Albion	Liverpool
15:00 GMT	Barry (yellow card) 64'	Report	Rondón 14'; Fletcher (yellow card) 51'; McClean (yellow card) 51'; Foster (yellow card) 75'; Brunt (yellow card) 83'	Stadium: Goodison Park; Attendance: 38,103 (1,610 away); Referee: Michael Oliver

27 February 2016 27	West Bromwich Albion	3–2	Crystal Palace	West Bromwich
17:30 GMT	Gardner 12'; Dawson (yellow card) 17', (goal) 20'; Berahino 31'; Chester (yellow card) 78'	Report	Adebayor (yellow card) 25'; Wickham 48', 80'; Cabaye (yellow card) 64'	Stadium: The Hawthorns; Attendance: 24,806 (1,989 away); Referee: Jonathan Moss

1 March 2016 28	Leicester City	2–2	West Bromwich Albion	Leicester
19:45 GMT	Drinkwater 30'; King 45+1'	Report	Rondón 11'; Sessègnon (yellow card) 32'; Gardner 50'; Yacob (yellow card) 88'	Stadium: King Power Stadium; Attendance: 32,018 (2,000 away); Referee: Mark Clattenburg

6 March 2016 29	West Bromwich Albion	1–0	Manchester United	West Bromwich
16:00 GMT	Olsson (yellow card) 58'; Rondón 66'	Report	Mata (yellow card) 23' (yellow-red card) 26'	Stadium: The Hawthorns; Attendance: 24,878 (2,600 away); Referee: Mike Dean

21 April 2016 30	Arsenal	2–0	West Bromwich Albion	Holloway, London
19:45 BST	Sánchez 6', 38'	Report	McAuley (yellow card) 41'	Stadium: Emirates Stadium; Attendance: 59,568 (1,023 away); Referee: Jonathan Moss

19 March 2016 31	West Bromwich Albion	0–1	Norwich City	West Bromwich
15:00 GMT	McAuley (yellow card) 90'	Report	Brady 50'; Odjidja-Ofoe (yellow card) 81'; Howson (yellow card) 90+5'	Stadium: The Hawthorns; Attendance: 25,039 (2,524 away); Referee: Anthony Taylor

2 April 2016 32	Sunderland	0–0	West Bromwich Albion	Sunderland
15:00 GMT		Report		Stadium: Stadium of Light; Attendance: 45,144 (1,752 away); Referee: Roger East

9 April 2016 33	Manchester City	2–1	West Bromwich Albion	Manchester
17:30 BST	Agüero 19' (pen.); Nasri 66'	Report	Sessègnon 6'; Gardner (yellow card) 33'	Stadium: Etihad Stadium; Attendance: 53,920 (843 away); Referee: Mike Jones

16 April 2016 34	West Bromwich Albion	0–1	Watford	West Bromwich
15:00 BST	Berahino (penalty missed) 68' (penalty missed) 87'	Report	Watson 27'; Britos (yellow card) 32'; Gomes (yellow card) 67'; Deeney (yellow card) 86'	Stadium: The Hawthorns; Attendance: 25,515 (2,583 away); Referee: Michael Oliver

25 April 2016 35	Tottenham Hotspur	1–1	West Bromwich Albion	London
20:00 BST	Dawson 33' (o.g.)	BBC Report	Evans (yellow card) 60'; Dawson 73'	Stadium: White Hart Lane; Attendance: 35,923; Referee: Mike Jones

30 April 2016 36	West Bromwich Albion	0–3	West Ham United	West Bromwich
16:00 BST		Report	Kouyaté 34'; Noble 45+2', 79'	Stadium: The Hawthorns; Attendance: 25,031 (2,599 away); Referee: Lee Mason

7 May 2016 37	Bournemouth	1–1	West Bromwich Albion	Bournemouth
15:00 BST	Elphick (yellow card) 42'; Arter (yellow card) 70'; Ritchie 82'	Report	Rondón 15'; Gardner (penalty missed) 27'; Evans (yellow card) 62'; Yacob (yellow card) 63'	Stadium: Dean Court; Attendance: 11,040 (1,250 away); Referee: Mark Clattenburg

15 May 2016 38	West Bromwich Albion	1–1	Liverpool	West Bromwich
15:00 BST	Rondón 13'; McClean (yellow card) 45+2'; Roberts (yellow card) 74'; Evans (yellow card) 87'	Report	Ibe 23'; Smith (yellow card) 40'	Stadium: The Hawthorns; Attendance: 26,196 (2,596 away); Referee: Bobby Madley

== Cup competitions ==
=== FA Cup ===
9 January 2016 Third round	West Bromwich Albion	2–2	Bristol City	West Bromwich
15:00 GMT	Morrison (yellow card) 42', (goal) 90+5'; Berahino 67'	Report	Wilbraham (yellow card) 45+2'; Baker (yellow card) 72'; Kodjia 74', (yellow card) 75'; Agard 83'	Stadium: The Hawthorns; Attendance: 24,917 (5,183 away); Referee: Graham Scott

19 January 2016 Third round replay	Bristol City	0–1	West Bromwich Albion	Bristol
19:45 GMT		Report	Yacob (yellow card) 45+2'; Rondón 52'	Stadium: Ashton Gate Stadium; Attendance: 15,185 (1,450 away); Referee: Jonathan Moss
Note: replay

30 January 2016 Fourth round	West Bromwich Albion	2–2	Peterborough United	West Bromwich
15:00 GMT	Berahino 14', 84'; McClean (yellow card) 67'	Report	Coulthirst 79'; Smith (yellow card) 83'; Angol (yellow card) 84'; Taylor 86'	Stadium: The Hawthorns; Attendance: 22,517 (4,023 away); Referee: Kevin Friend

10 February 2016 Fourth round replay	Peterborough United	1–1 (a.e.t.) (3-4 p)	West Bromwich Albion	Peterborough
19:45 GMT	Taylor 55'	Report	Fletcher 71'	Stadium: London Road Stadium; Attendance: 10,632 (1,436 away); Referee: Mike Jones
	Penalties
	Bostwick (penalty scored); Maddison (penalty scored); Samuelsen (penalty missed); Fox (penalty scored); Angol (penalty missed)		Pocognoli (penalty scored); Berahino (penalty scored); Gardner (penalty scored); Fletcher (penalty missed); Chester (penalty scored)

20 February 2016 Fifth Round	Reading	3–1	West Bromwich Albion F.C.	Reading
15:00 GMT (UTC)	McShane 59'; Hector 72'; Piazon 90+4'	Report	Fletcher 54'; Evans (yellow card) 87'	Stadium: Madejski Stadium; Attendance: 19,566 (3,686 away); Referee: Anthony Taylor

=== League Cup ===
West Bromwich Albion enter in the second round and were drawn at home against Port Vale. The third round draw was made on 25 August 2015 live on Sky Sports by Charlie Nicholas and Phil Thompson. West Brom were drawn away to Norwich City.

25 August 2015 Second round	West Bromwich Albion	0–0 (a.e.t.) (5–3 p)	Port Vale	West Bromwich
19:45 BST		Report		Stadium: The Hawthorns; Attendance: 13,915 (2,592 away)
	Penalties
	Lambert (penalty scored); Yacob (penalty scored); McManaman (penalty scored); Fletcher (penalty scored); Chester (penalty scored)		(penalty scored) Leitch-Smith; (penalty missed) Duffy; (penalty scored) Purkiss; (penalty scored) Foley

23 September 2015 Third round	Norwich City	3–0	West Bromwich Albion	Norwich
19:45 BST	Jarvis 62'; Lafferty 85'; Pocognoli 90' (o.g.)	Report		Stadium: Carrow Road; Attendance: 19,015 (710 away); Referee: Craig Pawson
