= 2016–17 West Bromwich Albion F.C. season =

West Bromwich Albion
2016–17 season
- Owner: Guochuan Lai
- Head Coach: Tony Pulis
- Stadium: The Hawthorns
- Premier League: 10th
- FA Cup: Third round (eliminated by Derby County)
- League Cup: Second round (eliminated by Northampton Town)
- Top goalscorer: League: Salomón Rondón (8); All: Salomón Rondón (8)
- Highest home attendance: 26,308
- Lowest home attendance: 21,467
- Average home league attendance: 23,876
Home colours	Away colours

The 2016–17 season was West Bromwich Albion's seventh consecutive season in the Premier League and their 139th year in existence. This season West Bromwich Albion participated in the Premier League, FA Cup and League Cup.

The season covers the period from 1 July 2016 to 30 June 2017, with competitive matches played between August and May.

== Background ==
Prior to the start of the season, Sam Wallace of The Telegraph predicted that the team would finish in 16th and referred to the club's lack of pre-season transfer activity. Phil McNulty, the BBC's chief football writer, expected head coach Tony Pulis to deliver stability and predicted a 14th-place finish for Albion. The Guardian's prediction also had the club finishing in 14th.

Ahead of the start of the season, Albion decorated their home ground, The Hawthorns, with images of contemporary and former players.

== Players ==
=== First-team squad ===
Squad at end of season

Note: Flags indicate national team as defined under FIFA eligibility rules; some limited exceptions apply. Players may hold more than one non-FIFA nationality.

No.	Pos.	Nation	Player
1	GK	ENG	Ben Foster
2	DF	CMR	Allan Nyom (Note: Nyom was born in Neuilly-sur-Seine, France, but also qualified to represent Cameroon internationally and made his international debut for Cameroon in November 2011.)
4	FW	WAL	Hal Robson-Kanu (Note: Robson-Kanu was born in Ealing, England, and represented them at U-19 and U-20 level, but also qualified to represent Wales internationally through his grandmother and represented them at U-21 level before making his international debut for Wales in May 2010.)
5	MF	ARG	Claudio Yacob
6	DF	NIR	Jonny Evans
7	MF	SCO	James Morrison (Note: Morrison was born in Darlington, England, and represented them at U-17, U-18, U-19, and U-21 level, but also qualified to represent Scotland internationally through his grandparents and made his international debut for Scotland in May 2008.)
8	MF	ENG	Jake Livermore
9	FW	VEN	Salomón Rondón
10	MF	SCO	Matt Phillips (Note: Phillips was born in Aylesbury, England, and represented them at U-19 and U-20 level, but also qualified to represent Scotland internationally through his grandparents and made his international debut for Scotland in May 2012.)
11	MF	NIR	Chris Brunt
12	DF	IRL	Marc Wilson (Note: Wilson was born in Aghagallon, Northern Ireland, and represented them at U-15 level, but also qualified to represent the Republic of Ireland internationally and represented them at U-18, U-19, and U-21 level before making his international debut for the Republic of Ireland in February 2011.) (on loan from Bournemouth)

No.	Pos.	Nation	Player
13	GK	WAL	Boaz Myhill (Note: Myhill was born in Modesto, California, United States, but was raised in England from the age of 1, qualifying to represent any of the home nations. He represented England at U-17, U-18, and U-20 level before making his international debut for Wales in March 2008.)
14	MF	IRL	James McClean (Note: McClean was born in Derry, Northern Ireland, and represented them at U-21 level, but also qualified to represent the Republic of Ireland internationally and made his international debut for the Republic of Ireland in February 2012.)
20	DF	ENG	Brendan Galloway (Note: Galloway was born in Harare, Zimbabwe, but was raised in England from the age of 6 and has represented them at every youth level between U-17 and U-21 level.) (on loan from Everton)
22	MF	BEL	Nacer Chadli
23	DF	NIR	Gareth McAuley
24	MF	SCO	Darren Fletcher (Captain)
25	DF	ENG	Craig Dawson
45	FW	ENG	Jonathan Leko (Note: Leko was born in Kinshasa, Democratic Republic of the Congo, but was raised in England from the age of 8 and has represented them at every youth level between U-16 and U-19 level.)
47	MF	ENG	Sam Field
49	DF	ENG	Kane Wilson

=== Left club during season ===
Note: Flags indicate national team as defined under FIFA eligibility rules; some limited exceptions apply. Players may hold more than one non-FIFA nationality.

No.	Pos.	Nation	Player
3	DF	SWE	Jonas Olsson (to Djurgårdens IF)
8	MF	ENG	Craig Gardner (on loan to Birmingham City)
15	DF	BEL	Sébastien Pocognoli (on loan to Brighton & Hove Albion)
16	DF	CRC	Cristian Gamboa (to Celtic)
17	FW	ENG	Rickie Lambert (to Cardiff City)

No.	Pos.	Nation	Player
18	FW	ENG	Saido Berahino (Note: Berahino was born in Bujumbura, Burundi, but was raised in England from the age of 10 and represented them at every youth level between U-16 and U-21 level before making his international debut for Burundi in September 2018.) (to Stoke City)
19	MF	ENG	Callum McManaman (on loan to Sheffield Wednesday)
41	MF	ENG	Joe Ward (to Carlisle United)
44	FW	WAL	Tyler Roberts (Note: Roberts was born in Gloucester, England, but also qualified to represent Wales internationally through two grandparents and represented them at every youth level between U-17 and U-21 level before making his international debut for Wales in September 2018.) (on loan to Shrewsbury Town)

=== Reserves and academy ===
Note: Flags indicate national team as defined under FIFA eligibility rules; some limited exceptions apply. Players may hold more than one non-FIFA nationality.

No.	Pos.	Nation	Player
30	DF	ENG	Callum Pritchatt
31	MF	IRL	Zack Elbouzedi
32	DF	ENG	Jordan Piggott
34	MF	ENG	Rekeem Harper
35	MF	ENG	James Smith
36	MF	ENG	Rahis Nabi (Note: Nabi was born in Aston, England, and represented them at U-17 level, but also qualified to represent Pakistan internationally and would make his international debut for Pakistan in June 2019.)
37	MF	ENG	Bradley Sweeney
38	GK	ENG	Jack Rose
39	DF	IRL	Robert McCourt
40	GK	ENG	Alex Palmer
42	FW	ENG	Kyle Edwards
43	DF	ENG	Callam Jones

No.	Pos.	Nation	Player
46	DF	IRL	Shaun Donnellan (Note: Donnellan was born in Barnet, England, but also qualified to represent the Republic of Ireland internationally through his father and represented them at U-19 and U-21 level.)
47	DF	ENG	Jack Fitzwater
52	FW	FIN	Marcus Forss
54	DF	USA	Daniel Barbir
55	FW	ENG	Rayhaan Tulloch
56	MF	ENG	Sameron Dool
57	MF	ENG	Dan Meredith
58	DF	ENG	Taylor Morrison
59	MF	FIN	Alex Bradley (Note: Bradley was born in Worcester, England, but also qualified to represent Finland internationally through his mother and represented them at U-19 level.)
60	FW	ENG	Cameron Walker
61	FW	IRL	Evan Pierce
62	FW	ENG	Jamie Soule

== Statistics ==
=== Appearances and goals ===
No.	Pos	Nat	Player	Total		Premier League		FA Cup		League Cup	
No.	Pos	Nat	Player	Apps	Goals	Apps	Goals	Apps	Goals	Apps	Goals
Goalkeepers
1	GK	(England) ENG	Ben Foster	38	0	38	0	0	0	0	0
13	GK	(Wales) WAL	Boaz Myhill	2	0	0	0	1	0	1	0
Defenders
2	DF	(Cameroon) CMR	Allan Nyom	34	0	29+3	0	0	0	2	0
6	DF	(Northern Ireland) NIR	Jonny Evans	31	2	30+1	2	0	0	0	0
11	DF	(Northern Ireland) NIR	Chris Brunt	31	3	27+4	3	0	0	0	0
20	DF	(England) ENG	Brendon Galloway	5	0	3	0	1	0	1	0
23	DF	(Northern Ireland) NIR	Gareth McAuley	38	7	36	6	1	0	1	1
25	DF	(England) ENG	Craig Dawson	39	4	37	4	1	0	1	0
49	DF	(England) ENG	Kane Wilson	1	0	0	0	0	0	0+1	0
Midfielders
5	MF	(Argentina) ARG	Claudio Yacob	34	0	27+6	0	1	0	0	0
7	MF	(Scotland) SCO	James Morrison	33	5	17+14	5	1	0	1	0
8	MF	(England) ENG	Jake Livermore	16	0	15+1	0	0	0	0	0
10	MF	(Scotland) SCO	Matt Phillips	29	5	26+1	4	1	1	1	0
14	MF	(Republic of Ireland) IRL	James McClean	36	2	13+21	1	1	0	1	1
22	MF	(Belgium) BEL	Nacer Chadli	32	5	27+4	5	0+1	0	0	0
24	MF	(Scotland) SCO	Darren Fletcher	40	2	37+1	2	1	0	0+1	0
47	MF	(England) ENG	Sam Field	9	0	4+4	0	0	0	1	0
Forwards
4	FW	(Wales) WAL	Hal Robson-Kanu	31	3	5+24	3	0+1	0	1	0
9	FW	(Venezuela) VEN	Salomón Rondón	40	8	32+6	8	1	0	0+1	0
45	FW	(England) ENG	Jonathan Leko	9	0	0+9	0	0	0	0	0
Players transferred out during the season
3	DF	(Sweden) SWE	Jonas Olsson	8	0	7	0	1	0	0	0
8	MF	(England) ENG	Craig Gardner	9	0	2+7	0	0	0	0	0
17	FW	(England) ENG	Rickie Lambert	1	0	0+1	0	0	0	0	0
18	FW	(England) ENG	Saido Berahino	5	0	3+1	0	0	0	1	0

Last updated: 31 June 2017
Source: Competitions

== Transfers ==
=== Transfers in ===
Date from	Position	Nationality	Name	From	Fee	Ref.
6 July 2016	RW	SCO	Matt Phillips	Queens Park Rangers	£5,500,000	
29 August 2016	LW	BEL	Nacer Chadli	Tottenham Hotspur	£13,000,000	
31 August 2016	RB	CMR	Allan Nyom	Watford	£4,000,000	
31 August 2016	LW	WAL	Hal Robson-Kanu	Reading	Free transfer	
20 January 2017	DM	ENG	Jake Livermore	Hull City	Undisclosed	

=== Transfers out ===
Date from	Position	Nationality	Name	To	Fee	Ref.
1 July 2016	CF	NGA	Victor Anichebe	Sunderland	Released	(Note: Following Anichebe's release, he signed for Sunderland.)
1 July 2016	GK	DEN	Anders Lindegaard	Preston North End	Mutual consent	(Note: Following Lindegaard's depauture, he signed for Preston North End.)
1 July 2016	CM	ENG	Samir Nabi	Delhi Dynamos	Released	(Note: Following Nabi's release, he signed for Delhi Dynamos.)
1 July 2016	SS	BEN	Stéphane Sessègnon	Montpellier	Released	(Note: Following Sessègnon's release, he signed for Montpellier.)
2 July 2016	CB	ENG	Josh Ezewele	Yeovil Town	Free transfer	
12 August 2016	CB	WAL	James Chester	Aston Villa	£8,000,000	
30 August 2016	RB	CRC	Cristian Gamboa	Celtic	£1,000,000	
31 August 2016	CF	ENG	Rickie Lambert	Cardiff City	Undisclosed	
20 January 2017	CF	ENG	Saido Berahino	Stoke City	Undisclosed	
31 January 2017	AM	ENG	Joe Ward	Carlisle United	Released	
23 March 2017	CB	SWE	Jonas Olsson	Djurgårdens IF	Mutual consent	

=== Loans in ===
Date from	Position	Nationality	Name	From	Date until	Ref.
22 August 2016	LB	ENG	Brendan Galloway	Everton	End of Season	
31 January 2017	CB	IRL	Marc Wilson	AFC Bournemouth	End of Season	

=== Loans out ===
Date from	Position	Nationality	Name	To	Date until	Ref.
1 July 2016	CB	ENG	Callam Jones	Accrington Stanley	1 January 2017	
8 July 2016	CB	IRL	Shaun Donnellan	Stevenage	1 January 2017	
28 July 2016	CF	WAL	Tyler Roberts	Oxford United	3 January 2017	
28 July 2016	GK	ENG	Ethan Ross	Worcester City	3 January 2017	
29 July 2016	CB	ENG	Kyle Howkins	Mansfield Town	3 January 2017	
1 August 2016	RW	ENG	Chay Scrivens	Torquay United	3 January 2017	
5 August 2016	CF	ENG	Tahvon Campbell	Yeovil Town	3 January 2017	
20 August 2016	AM	ENG	Joe Ward	Torquay United	3 January 2017	
31 August 2016	LB	BEL	Sébastien Pocognoli	Brighton & Hove Albion	End of Season	
31 August 2016	CF	ENG	Andre Wright	Coventry City	9 January 2017	
1 January 2017	RW	ENG	Callum McManaman	Sheffield Wednesday	End of Season	
11 January 2017	CM	ENG	Craig Gardner	Birmingham City	End of Season	
17 January 2017	CF	WAL	Tyler Roberts	Shrewsbury Town	End of Season	
17 January 2017	CF	ENG	Andre Wright	Yeovil Town	End of Season	
31 January 2017	CF	ENG	Tahvon Campbell	Notts County	End of Season	

== Competitions ==
=== Overview ===
Competition	Record							
Competition	P	W	D	L	GF	GA	GD	Win %
Premier League	38	12	9	17	43	51	−8	31.58
FA Cup	1	0	0	1	1	2	−1	0.00
League Cup	1	0	1	0	2	2	+0	0.00
Total	40	12	10	18	46	55	−9	30.00

Updated to match played 30 July 2017
Source: Competitions

=== Pre-season friendlies ===
On 11 May 2016, West Bromwich Albion announced a friendly double-header in Devon with games coming against Plymouth Argyle and Torquay United. A day later, on 12 May, the club announced a third pre-season friendly against Kidderminster Harriers, it will take place on 16 July. On 22 June, West Brom announced that they have accepted an invitation to take part in the inaugural 2016 Fox Sports Cup.

Win Draw Loss

13 July 2016 Friendly	Paris Saint-Germain	2–1	West Bromwich Albion	Schladming, Austria
18:00 CEST	Rabiot 62'; Lucas 79'	Report	David Luiz 15' (o.g.)	Stadium: Schladming Arena

16 July 2016 Friendly	Kidderminster Harriers	1–2	West Bromwich Albion	Kidderminster, England
15:00 BST	Trialist 83' (pen.)	Report	Berahino 17', 58'	Stadium: Aggborough; Attendance: 3,301

21 July 2016 2016 Fox Sports Cup	Vitesse	1–2	West Bromwich Albion	Arnhem, Netherlands
17:30 BST	De Souza 57'	Report	Rondón 25'; McManaman 70'	Stadium: GelreDome

23 July 2016 2016 Fox Sports Cup	West Bromwich Albion	Cancelled	PSV	Arnhem, Netherlands
17:00 BST		Cancellation		Stadium: GelreDome

30 July 2016 Friendly	Plymouth Argyle	0–0	West Bromwich Albion	Plymouth, England
17:30 BST		Report		Stadium: Home Park

1 August 2016 Friendly	Torquay United	2–1	West Bromwich Albion	Torquay, England
19:30 BST	Hall 46'; Williams 59'	Report	Phillips 80'	Stadium: Plainmoor

=== Premier League ===
==== League table ====
Pos	Team	Pld	W	D	L	GF	GA	GD	Pts
8	Southampton	38	12	10	16	41	48	−7	46
9	Bournemouth	38	12	10	16	55	67	−12	46
10	West Bromwich Albion	38	12	9	17	43	51	−8	45
11	West Ham United	38	12	9	17	47	64	−17	45
12	Leicester City	38	12	8	18	48	63	−15	44

Source: Premier League
Rules for classification: 1) Points; 2) Goal difference; 3) Goals scored; 4) Play-offs (only if needed to decide champion, teams for relegation or teams for UEFA competitions).

==== Results summary ====
Overall								Home						Away					
Pld	W	D	L	GF	GA	GD	Pts	W	D	L	GF	GA	GD	W	D	L	GF	GA	GD
38	12	9	17	43	51	−8	45	9	2	8	27	22	+5	3	7	9	16	29	−13

Last updated: 21 May 2017.
Source: Premier League

==== Results by matchday ====
Matchday	1	2	3	4	5	6	7	8	9	10	11	12	13	14	15	16	17	18	19	20	21	22	23	24	25	26	27	28	29	30	31	32	33	34	35	36	37	38
Ground	A	H	H	A	H	A	A	H	A	H	A	H	A	H	A	H	H	A	A	H	A	H	A	H	A	H	H	A	H	A	A	H	H	H	A	H	A	A
Result	W	L	D	L	W	D	D	D	L	L	W	W	D	W	L	W	L	L	W	W	L	W	D	W	D	W	L	L	W	D	L	L	L	L	D	L	L	L
Position	3	8	10	12	8	9	9	10	13	15	11	9	9	6	8	7	7	9	8	8	8	8	8	8	8	8	8	8	8	8	8	8	8	8	8	8	9	10

Updated to match(es) played on 21 May 2017. Source: Statto.com
A = Away; H = Home; W = Win; D = Draw; L = Loss

==== Matches ====
13 August 2016 1	Crystal Palace	0–1	West Bromwich Albion	Selhurst
15:00 BST	Zaha (yellow card) 84'; Bolasie (yellow card) 87'	Report	Dawson (yellow card) 35'; Rondón 74'; Evans (yellow card) 84'	Stadium: Selhurst Park; Attendance: 24,490 (2,300 away); Referee: Craig Pawson

20 August 2016 2	West Bromwich Albion	1–2	Everton	West Bromwich
15:00 BST	McAuley 9'; Berahino (yellow card) 26'; Olsson (yellow card) 59'; Evans (yellow card) 90+3'	Report	Mirallas 45+2'; Barry 60'; Stekelenburg (yellow card) 90+1'	Stadium: The Hawthorns; Attendance: 23,654 (2,600 away); Referee: Neil Swarbrick

28 August 2016 3	West Bromwich Albion	0–0	Middlesbrough	West Bromwich
13:30 BST	Yacob (yellow card) 65'	Report	Ayala (yellow card) 2'; Ramírez (yellow card) 49'; Barragán (yellow card) 77'	Stadium: The Hawthorns; Attendance: 23,690 (2,140 away); Referee: Anthony Taylor

10 September 2016 4	AFC Bournemouth	1–0	West Bromwich Albion	Bournemouth
15:00 BST	Smith (yellow card) 71'; Wilson 79'	Report	Yacob (yellow card) 53'; Evans (yellow card) 89'; Field (yellow card) 90'	Stadium: Dean Court; Attendance: 11,184 (1,295 away); Referee: Kevin Friend

17 September 2016 5	West Bromwich Albion	4–2	West Ham United	West Bromwich
15:00 BST	Chadli 8' (pen.), 56'; Rondón 37'; Dawson (yellow card) 43'; McClean 44'; Nyom (yellow card) 86'	Report	Antonio 61'; Lanzini 65' (pen.); Feghouli (yellow card) 86'	Stadium: The Hawthorns; Attendance: 22,209 (2,600 away); Referee: Mark Clattenburg

24 September 2016 6	Stoke City	1–1	West Bromwich Albion	Stoke-on-Trent
15:00 BST	Whelan (yellow card) 16'; Shawcross (yellow card) 26'; Allen 73'; Adam (yellow card) 90+3'	Report	Chadli (yellow card) 37'; Yacob (yellow card) 54'; Dawson (yellow card) 60'; Nyom (yellow card) 70'; Rondón 90+1'	Stadium: bet365 Stadium; Attendance: 27,645 (1,600 away); Referee: Martin Atkinson

1 October 2016 7	Sunderland	1–1	West Bromwich Albion	Sunderland
15:00 BST	Kirchhoff (yellow card) 36'; Van Aanholt 83'	Report	Yacob (yellow card) 27'; Chadli 35'; McClean (yellow card) 69'; Evans (yellow card) 90+6'	Stadium: Stadium of Light; Attendance: 40,043 (836 away); Referee: Stuart Attwell

15 October 2016 8	West Bromwich Albion	1–1	Tottenham Hotspur	West Bromwich
15:00 BST	McClean (yellow card) 44'; Chadli 82'; Evans (yellow card) 90+4'	Report	Vertonghen (yellow card) 54'; Dembélé (yellow card) 86'; Alli 89'	Stadium: The Hawthorns; Attendance: 24,263 (2,600 away); Referee: Kevin Friend

22 October 2016 9	Liverpool	2–1	West Bromwich Albion	Liverpool
17:30 BST	Mané 20'; Coutinho 35'; Henderson (yellow card) 88'	Report	Yacob (yellow card) 43'; McClean (yellow card) 57'; McAuley 81'; Morrison (yellow card) 85'	Stadium: Anfield; Attendance: 53,218 (1,871 away); Referee: Neil Swarbrick

29 October 2016 10	West Bromwich Albion	0–4	Manchester City	West Bromwich
15:00 BST	Dawson (yellow card) 16'; Olsson (yellow card) 21'; Morrison (yellow card) 53'; McClean (yellow card) 56'	Report	Nolito (yellow card) 15'; Agüero 19', 28'; Kolarov (yellow card) 62'; Fernando (yellow card) 76'; Gündoğan 79', 90'	Stadium: The Hawthorns; Attendance: 22,470 (2,600 away); Referee: Lee Mason

6 November 2016 11	Leicester City	1–2	West Bromwich Albion	Leicester
16:30 GMT	Slimani 55'	Report	Morrison 52'; Phillips 72'; Gardner (yellow card) 87'; Brunt (yellow card) 90'	Stadium: King Power Stadium; Attendance: 31,879 (2,085 away); Referee: Craig Pawson

21 November 2016 12	West Bromwich Albion	4–0	Burnley	West Bromwich
20:00 GMT	Phillips 4'; Morrison 16'; Fletcher 37'; Rondón 64'	Report		Stadium: The Hawthorns; Attendance: 23,016 (1,204 away); Referee: Mike Jones

26 November 2016 13	Hull City	1–1	West Bromwich Albion	Hull
15:00 GMT	Dawson (yellow card) 29' (goal) 72'; Clucas (yellow card) 45'; Diomande (yellow card) 73'	Report	McAuley 34' (yellow card) 60'; Evans (yellow card) 67'	Stadium: KCOM Stadium; Attendance: 18,086 (1,517 away); Referee: Paul Tierney

3 December 2016 14	West Bromwich Albion	3–1	Watford	West Bromwich
15:00 GMT	McAuley (yellow card) 15'; Evans 16'; Brunt 34'; McClean (yellow card) 84'; Phillips 90+1'	Report	Kabasele 60'; Pereyra (red card) 84'; Deeney (yellow card) 85'	Stadium: The Hawthorns; Attendance: 22,244 (2,600 away); Referee: Graham Scott

11 December 2016 15	Chelsea	1–0	West Bromwich Albion	Fulham, London
12:00 GMT	Kanté (yellow card) 48'; Costa 76'; Matić (yellow card) 88'	Report	Brunt (yellow card) 19'; McAuley (yellow card) 29'; Dawson (yellow card) 51'; Yacob (yellow card) 56'	Stadium: Stamford Bridge; Attendance: 41,622 (1,500 away); Referee: Mike Dean

14 December 2016 16	West Bromwich Albion	3–1	Swansea City	West Bromwich
20:00 GMT	Rondón 50', 61', 63'	Report	Routledge 78'	Stadium: The Hawthorns; Attendance: 21,467 (1,383 away); Referee: Michael Oliver

17 December 2016 17	West Bromwich Albion	0–2	Manchester United	West Bromwich
18:30 GMT	Dawson (yellow card) 49'; Rondón (yellow card) 65'; Brunt (yellow card) 87'	Report	Ibrahimović 5', 56', (yellow card) 24'; Lingard (yellow card) 57'; Rojo (yellow card) 65'	Stadium: The Hawthorns; Attendance: 26,308 (2,599 away); Referee: Anthony Taylor

26 December 2016 18	Arsenal	1–0	West Bromwich Albion	Holloway, London
15:00 GMT	Giroud (yellow card) 43', (goal) 86'; Gibbs (yellow card) 65'; Ramsey (yellow card) 88'	Report	Foster (yellow card) 83'	Stadium: Emirates Stadium; Attendance: 59,925 (1,512 away); Referee: Neil Swarbrick

31 December 2016 19	Southampton	1–2	West Bromwich Albion	Southampton
15:00 GMT	van Dijk (yellow card) 32' (yellow-red card) 89'; Long 41'; Boufal (yellow card) 77'	Report	Nyom (yellow card) 36'; Phillips 43'; Robson-Kanu 50' (yellow card) 52'; Dawson (yellow card) 75'	Stadium: St. Mary's Stadium; Attendance: 30,975 (1,311 away); Referee: Mike Jones

2 January 2017 20	West Bromwich Albion	3–1	Hull City	West Bromwich
15:00 GMT	Brunt 49'; McAuley 62'; Morrison 73'	Report	Snodgrass 21'	Stadium: The Hawthorns; Attendance: 23,402 (1,043 away); Referee: Mark Clattenburg

14 January 2017 21	Tottenham Hotspur	4–0	West Bromwich Albion	Tottenham, London
12:30 GMT	Kane 12', 77', 82'; McAuley 26' (o.g.)	Report	Olsson (yellow card) 64'; McAuley (yellow card) 70'	Stadium: White Hart Lane; Attendance: 31,613 (1,700 away); Referee: Anthony Taylor

21 January 2017 22	West Bromwich Albion	2–0	Sunderland	West Bromwich
15:00 GMT	Fletcher 30'; Brunt 36'; Nyom (yellow card) 90+2'	Report	Honeyman (yellow card) 85'	Stadium: The Hawthorns; Attendance: 24,380 (2,587 away); Referee: Craig Pawson

31 January 2017 23	Middlesbrough	1–1	West Bromwich Albion	Middlesbrough
19:45 GMT	Negredo 17' (pen.) (yellow card) 51'; Espinosa (yellow card) 45'	Report	Morrison 6'; Dawson (yellow card) 89'	Stadium: Riverside Stadium; Attendance: 27,316 (708 away); Referee: Stuart Attwell

4 February 2017 24	West Bromwich Albion	1–0	Stoke City	West Bromwich
15:00 GMT	Morrison 6'; Phillips (yellow card) 60'; Foster (yellow card) 66'	Report	Arnautović (yellow card) 30'; Martins Indi (yellow card) 90'	Stadium: The Hawthorns; Attendance: 23,921 (2,597 away); Referee: Kevin Friend

11 February 2017 25	West Ham United	2–2	West Bromwich Albion	Stratford, London
15:00 GMT	Obiang (yellow card) 60'; Feghouli 63'; Reid (yellow card) 85'; Lanzini 86'; Noble (yellow card) 90+4'	Report	Chadli 6'; Rondón (yellow card) 73'; Brunt (yellow card) 88'; McAuley 90+4'	Stadium: London Stadium; Attendance: 56,983 (3,000 away); Referee: Michael Oliver

25 February 2017 26	West Bromwich Albion	2–1	Bournemouth	West Bromwich
15:00 GMT	Dawson 10'; McAuley 24'	Report	King 5' (pen.)	Stadium: The Hawthorns; Attendance: 24,162 (1,459 away); Referee: Mark Clattenburg

4 March 2017 27	West Bromwich Albion	0–2	Crystal Palace	West Bromwich
15:00 GMT		Report	Benteke (yellow card) 45+1'; Zaha 55'; Townsend 84'	Stadium: The Hawthorns; Attendance: 24,051 (2,506 away); Referee: Mike Jones

11 March 2017 28	Everton	3–0	West Bromwich Albion	Liverpool
15:00 GMT	Mirallas 39'; Schneiderlin 45+1'; Barry (yellow card) 81'; Lukaku 82'	Report	Yacob (yellow card) 73'; Dawson (yellow card) 88'	Stadium: Goodison Park; Attendance: 39,592 (1,700 away); Referee: Graham Scott

18 March 2017 29	West Bromwich Albion	3–1	Arsenal	West Bromwich
12:30 GMT	Dawson 12', 75'; McClean (yellow card) 42'; Robson-Kanu 55'	Report	Sánchez 15'	Stadium: The Hawthorns; Attendance: 24,065 (2,600 away); Referee: Neil Swarbrick

1 April 2017 30	Manchester United	0–0	West Bromwich Albion	Manchester
15:00 BST	Rojo (yellow card) 43'; Fellaini (yellow card) 90+5'; Rooney (yellow card) 90+5'	Report	Nyom (yellow card) 47'; Yacob (yellow card) 90+5'	Stadium: Old Trafford; Attendance: 75,397; Referee: Mike Dean

4 April 2017 31	Watford	2–0	West Bromwich Albion	Watford
19:45 BST	Niang 13' (yellow card) 70'; Britos (yellow card) 40' (yellow-red card) 65'; Deeney 49'	Report	Robson-Kanu (yellow card) 43'; McClean (yellow card) 45+6'; Livermore (yellow card) 59'; Nyom (yellow card) 83'	Stadium: Vicarage Road; Attendance: 20,090 (1,688 away); Referee: Paul Tierney

8 April 2017 32	West Bromwich Albion	0–1	Southampton	West Bromwich
15:00 BST	Evans (yellow card) 37'; Phillips (yellow card) 49'	Report	Clasie 25'; Cédric (yellow card) 76'; Forster (yellow card) 90+3'	Stadium: The Hawthorns; Attendance: 24,697 (2,384 away); Referee: Christopher Kavanagh

16 April 2017 33	West Bromwich Albion	0–1	Liverpool	West Bromwich
13:30 BST	Brunt (yellow card) 45'; Robson-Kanu (yellow card) 49'; Evans (yellow card) 66'	Report	Firmino 45+1'; Lucas (yellow card) 72'	Stadium: The Hawthorns; Attendance: 25,669 (2,600 away); Referee: Jonathan Moss

29 April 2017 34	West Bromwich Albion	0–1	Leicester City	West Bromwich
15:00 BST	Yacob (yellow card) 22'; Morrison (yellow card) 66'	Report	Drinkwater (yellow card) 16'; Vardy 43'; Benalouane (yellow card) 52'	Stadium: The Hawthorns; Attendance: 24,611 (2,596 away); Referee: Mark Clattenburg

6 May 2017 35	Burnley	2–2	West Bromwich Albion	Burnley
15:00 BST	Vokes 55', 86'; Barnes (yellow card) 59'	Report	Rondón 66'; Wilson (yellow card) 76'; Dawson 78'; McAuley (yellow card) 85'; Nyom (yellow card) 90+1'	Stadium: Turf Moor; Attendance: 20,825 (2,458 away); Referee: Mike Jones

12 May 2017 36	West Bromwich Albion	0–1	Chelsea	West Bromwich
20:00 BST	McClean (yellow card) 20'; Field (yellow card) 36'; Wilson (yellow card) 71'	Report	Batshuayi 82'	Stadium: The Hawthorns; Attendance: 25,367 (2,600 away); Referee: Michael Oliver

16 May 2017 37	Manchester City	3–1	West Bromwich Albion	Manchester
20:00 BST	Jesus 27'; De Bruyne 29'; Touré 57'; Sané (yellow card) 71'	Report	Chadli (yellow card) 51'; Dawson (yellow card) 52'; Robson-Kanu 87'	Stadium: City of Manchester Stadium; Attendance: 53,624 (680 away); Referee: Craig Pawson

21 May 2017 38	Swansea City	2–1	West Bromwich Albion	Swansea
15:00 BST	Ayew 72'; Llorente 86'; Fernández (yellow card) 90+2'	Report	Evans 33'; Wilson (yellow card) 51'	Stadium: Liberty Stadium; Attendance: 20,889 (2,089 away); Referee: Mike Dean

=== FA Cup ===
7 January 2017 Third round	West Bromwich Albion	1–2	Derby County	West Bromwich
15:00 GMT	Phillips 35'; Morrison (yellow card) 53'	Report	Bent 51'; Ince 54' (yellow card) 90+5'; Johnson (yellow card) 90+2'	Stadium: The Hawthorns; Attendance: 25,288 (5,200 away); Referee: Jonathan Moss

=== EFL Cup ===
23 August 2016 Second round	Northampton Town	2–2 (a.e.t.) (4–3 p)	West Bromwich Albion	Northampton
19:45 BST	O'Toole (yellow card) 14'; Diamond 36'; Gorré (yellow card) 79'; Revell 82'; Smith (yellow card) 120+1'	Report	McClean (yellow card) 13' (goal) 45'; McAuley 47'; Morrison (yellow card) 101'	Stadium: Sixfields Stadium; Attendance: 5,516 (1,549 away); Referee: Darren Bond
	Penalties
	Hoskins (penalty scored); Taylor (penalty scored); O'Toole (penalty missed); Revell (penalty scored); Gorré (penalty scored)		Rondón (penalty scored); Berahino (penalty missed); Fletcher (penalty scored); Phillips (penalty scored); Morrison (penalty missed)
