= Gary Donnellan =

English footballer

Personal information
- Full name: Gary Donnellan
- Date of birth: 3 July 1962 (age 64)
- Place of birth: Paddington, England
- Position: Midfielder

Youth career
- –1980: Chelsea

Senior career*
Years	Team	Apps	(Gls)
1980	Chelsea	0	(0)
1980–1981	Watford	0	(0)
1981–1983	Reading	41	(5)
1983–1987	Wealdstone	116	(14)
1987–1990	Yeovil Town		(13)
1990	Enfield		
1990–1992	Slough Town	47	(7)
1992–1993	Hendon	24	(3)
Total		228+	(42+)
- * Club domestic league appearances and goals

Gary Donnellan (born 3 July 1962) is an English former footballer who played as a midfielder in the Football League for Reading.

== Career ==
Donnellan started his career as an apprentice at Chelsea, before being signed by Watford in 1980. Having only made one appearance for The Hornets, in the Football League Group Cup, he moved to Reading, with whom he made 41 appearances in the Football League Third Division over the next two seasons.

He then joined Wealdstone, and was a regular in the side that won the 1984–85 Alliance Premier League–FA Trophy "double". In the latter part of the 1986–87 season, Donnellan followed Wealdstone manager Brian Hall to Isthmian League club Yeovil Town and helped them finish as runners-up. He contributed to their Isthmian League and Cup double in his first full season, and made 47 appearances in the Conference over the next two seasons, taking his totals to 129 appearances and 18 goals in all competitions. Towards the end of the 1989–90 season, he was transferred to Enfield, struggling at the bottom of the Conference, for a club record £20,000. He played eight times, scoring once, as his new team were relegated. He later went on to represent Slough Town and Hendon.

== Personal life ==
Donnellan was born to Irish parents in Paddington, London. His brother Leo played football professionally, as have Leo's sons Shaun and Leo junior. Donnellan began working in financial services in 1990, and since 2004 has worked for independent financial advisers Kingsway Wealth Management.
