= Shaun Donnellan =

Irish footballer

Personal information
- Full name: Shaun Donnellan
- Date of birth: 16 October 1996 (age 30)
- Place of birth: Barnet, England
- Height: 1.88 m (6 ft 2 in)
- Positions: Midfielder; defender

Team information
- Current team: Truro City
- Number: 25

Youth career
- 2013–2015: West Bromwich Albion

Senior career*
Years	Team	Apps	(Gls)
2015–2018	West Bromwich Albion	0	(0)
2015–2016	→ Worcester City (loan)	16	(4)
2017	→ Dagenham & Redbridge (loan)	21	(0)
2017–2018	→ Walsall (loan)	10	(0)
2018–2019	Yeovil Town	22	(0)
2019	Maidstone United	10	(0)
2019–2020	Woking	30	(2)
2020–2022	Maidenhead United	41	(3)
2022–2024	Torquay United	57	(2)
2024–2026	Livingston	3	(0)
2025–2026	→ Truro City (loan)	17	(1)
2026–	Truro City	13	(0)

International career^{‡}
2014	Republic of Ireland U19	2	(0)
2017–2018	Republic of Ireland U21	8	(1)
- * Club domestic league appearances and goals as of 19:15, 2 January 2025 (UTC) ‡ National team caps and goals as of 19:32, 16 October 2018 (UTC)

Shaun Donnellan (born 16 October 1996) is a professional footballer who plays as a midfielder for National League South club Truro City. Born in England, he has represented Ireland at youth level.

== Personal life ==
Donnellan was born in Barnet, Greater London, England, and attended St James' Catholic High School in Colindale. He is the son of former Chelsea, Fulham and Republic of Ireland U21 international Leo Donnellan. His uncle, Gary Donnellan, was also a professional footballer for Watford and his younger brother, Leo Jr., played in the National League for Dagenham & Redbridge.

== Career ==
He started his career in the youth team at West Bromwich Albion where he started a two-year scholarship in June 2013. After two seasons playing for the under-21 side he signed his first professional contract in July 2015, signing a one-year deal. In December 2015, he was sent out on loan to National League North side Worcester City on a one-month loan deal. In January 2016, after four appearances and one goal against Corby Town, his loan was extended for a further month. In February 2016, his loan was later extended until the end of the season and Donnellan went on to make a total of sixteen appearances for Worcester, also playing alongside his brother Leo, scoring four goals as the club narrowly avoided relegation.

After his loan return he penned a new one-year contract in July 2016, with the option of a further year in the club's favour. Later in the month he joined EFL League Two side Stevenage on a loan deal until January 2017. At the end of August his loan was cancelled by Stevenage and he return to West Brom having not made a single first team appearance. In January 2017, he was sent out on loan again, joining National League side Dagenham & Redbridge on a three-month loan deal. He was a first team regular for Dagenham as they narrowly missed out on promotion in the play-offs to Forest Green Rovers, making a total of twenty-one appearances.

In June 2017, West Brom chose to take up the option of a further one-year contract extension after the successful loan spell at Dagenham. In August 2017, he was sent on a six-month loan to EFL League One side Walsall after he had impressed in a pre-season friendly against the Saddlers. He made his league debut in a 2–1 win over Oldham Athletic.

After making eleven appearances while on loan at Walsall he returned to his parent club West Brom, Donnellan then joined Yeovil Town on 27 January 2018 on a free transfer, signing an eighteen-month deal. On 8 January 2019, Donnellan left the Glovers after his contract was terminated by mutual consent.

On 31 January 2019, Donnellan signed for National League side Maidstone United.

On 13 July 2019, after impressing manager Alan Dowson in pre-season, Donnellan signed a deal with newly promoted Woking. He played 32 times in the 2019–20 season, scoring two goals.

On 25 July 2020, Donnellan signed for Maidenhead United. He left the Magpies at the end of the 2021–22 season, after three goals in 43 games.

On 15 July 2022, Donnellan joined Torquay United. He stayed for one and a half seasons, making 68 appearances across all competitions, scoring 3 goals, before agreeing a move to Livingston.

Donnellan signed a pre-contract agreement with Livingston in December 2023, joining the club on 1 January 2024 after an agreement was made between Livi and Torquay to release him from his contract early.

In August 2025, Donnellan joined Truro City on a loan deal until January 2026. On 2 January 2026, he made the move permanently on a multi-year contract.

== International career ==
Donnellan is eligible for England and also the Republic of Ireland through his father's family. He received his first call-up for the Republic of Ireland under-19 side in September 2014 for a friendly match against the Netherlands. He replaced Fiacre Kelleher as a second-half substitute in the 1–0 win. A month later he made his second appearance in a 1–0 victory over Sweden. In March 2017 he received his first call-up to the under-21 side for a 2019 UEFA under-21 Championship qualifier against Kosovo, making his debut in a 1–0 victory.

== Career statistics ==
As of match played 10 February 2024

Appearances and goals by club, season and competition
Club	Season	League			National Cup (Note: Includes FA Cup, Scottish Cup)		League Cup		Other		Total	
Club	Season	Division	Apps	Goals	Apps	Goals	Apps	Goals	Apps	Goals	Apps	Goals
West Bromwich Albion	2015–16	Premier League	0	0	0	0	0	0	—		0	0
West Bromwich Albion	2016–17	Premier League	0	0	0	0	—		—		0	0
West Bromwich Albion	2017–18	Premier League	0	0	—		0	0	—		0	0
West Bromwich Albion	Total		0	0	0	0	0	0	—		0	0
West Bromwich Albion U23	2016–17	—			—		—		3 (Note: Appearances in EFL Trophy)	0	3	0
Worcester City (loan)	2015–16	National League North	16	4	—		—		—		16	4
Stevenage (loan)	2016–17	League Two	0	0	—		0	0	—		0	0
Dagenham & Redbridge (loan)	2016–17	National League	19	0	—		—		2 (Note: Appearances in National League play-offs)	0	21	0
Walsall (loan)	2017–18	League One	10	0	1	0	—		—		11	0
Yeovil Town	2017–18	League Two	11	0	—		—		0	0	11	0
Yeovil Town	2018–19	League Two	11	0	1	0	0	0	2	1	14	1
Yeovil Town	Total		22	0	1	0	0	0	2	1	25	1
Maidstone United	2018–19	National League	10	0	—		—		4 (Note: Appearances in FA Trophy)	0	14	0
Woking	2019–20	National League	30	2	2	0	—		0	0	32	2
Maidenhead United	2020–21	National League	13	2	1	0	—		1	0	15	2
Maidenhead United	2021–22	National League	28	1	0	0	—		0	0	28	1
Maidenhead United	Total		41	3	1	0	—		1	0	43	3
Torquay United	2022–23	National League	40	0	4	1	—		3	1	47	2
Torquay United	2023–24	National League South	17	2	3	0	—		1	0	21	2
Torquay United	Total		57	2	7	1	—		4	1	68	3
Livingston	2023–24	Scottish Premiership	3	0	2	0	—		—		5	0
Career total			208	11	14	1	0	0	16	2	238	14

== Honours ==
Livingston

- Scottish Premiership play-offs: 2025
