= Tahvon Campbell =

English footballer (born 1997)

Personal information
- Full name: Tahvon Ravell Campbell
- Date of birth: 10 January 1997 (age 29)
- Place of birth: Birmingham, England
- Height: 6 ft 1 in (1.85 m)
- Position: Forward

Team information
- Current team: Brackley Town

Youth career
- 2006–2015: West Bromwich Albion

Senior career*
Years	Team	Apps	(Gls)
2015–2018	West Bromwich Albion	0	(0)
2015	→ Kidderminster Harriers (loan)	15	(0)
2016	→ Yeovil Town (loan)	17	(1)
2016–2017	→ Yeovil Town (loan)	19	(1)
2017	→ Notts County (loan)	11	(0)
2017	→ Solihull Moors (loan)	13	(1)
2018	→ Forest Green Rovers (loan)	14	(2)
2018–2019	Forest Green Rovers	18	(3)
2019	→ Gillingham (loan)	6	(0)
2019–2021	Cheltenham Town	11	(0)
2020–2021	→ Gloucester City (loan)	5	(2)
2021	→ FC Halifax Town (loan)	15	(1)
2021–2022	Woking	21	(13)
2022–2024	Rochdale	20	(2)
2023	→ Aldershot Town (loan)	9	(3)
2023–2024	→ Wealdstone (loan)	19	(6)
2024–2025	Solihull Moors (Note: According to Soccerbase, Campbell scored 3 goals in the 2024–25 season. However, this includes a goal in a 1–1 draw at home to Dagenham & Redbridge which is incorrectly attributed to him. This goal was instead scored by Manny Duku.)	25	(9)
2025–2026	Yeovil Town	33	(3)
2026	→ Brackley Town (loan)	4	(1)
2026–	Brackley Town	0	(0)
- * Club domestic league appearances and goals as of 16:38, 25 April 2026 (UTC)

Tahvon Ravell Campbell (born 10 January 1997) is an English professional footballer who plays as a forward for National League North club Brackley Town.

== Career ==
=== West Bromwich Albion ===
Born in Birmingham, Campbell started his career at West Bromwich Albion, joining the club in 2006. Ahead of the 2015–16 season, Campbell signed for National League side Kidderminster Harriers on loan until 2 January 2016. Having made 15 appearances for Kidderminster, Campbell was recalled to West Brom on 22 October 2015.

On 2 January 2016, Campbell joined Football League Two side Yeovil Town on a one-month loan deal, he made his debut later that day in a 1–0 win against York City. He scored his debut professional goal with a curling shot from 25 yards, in Yeovil's 2–1 victory over Crawley Town on 23 January 2016. On 5 August 2016, he returned to Yeovil on a further sixth-month loan deal.

On 31 January 2017, Campbell joined Notts County on loan until the end of the season.

On 20 January 2018, Campbell joined Forest Green Rovers in League Two for the remainder of the 2017–18 season. Campbell was released by West Bromwich Albion at the end of the 2017–18 season.

=== Forest Green Rovers ===
Following his release he subsequently joined Forest Green on a permanent deal following his earlier loan spell, signing a one-year deal with the League Two side. On 31 January 2019, he joined Gillingham on loan.

He was released by Forest Green Rovers at the end of the 2018–19 season.

=== Cheltenham Town ===
On 14 June 2019, Campbell signed a two-year contract with Cheltenham Town. In November 2020 he joined Gloucester City on loan until January 2021. On 18 January 2021, Campbell joined National League side FC Halifax Town on loan for the remainder of the 2020-21 season.

=== Woking ===
On 24 July 2021, Campbell agreed to join National League side, Woking following a short-term trial period. On the opening day of the 2021–22 campaign, Campbell made his Woking debut during their 2–1 away victory at Wealdstone, featuring for 82 minutes before being replaced by George Oakley. Just over a week later, Campbell scored his first goals for the club in a 4–0 away victory at Torquay United, netting in both the 3rd and 55th minute. Campbell continued his impressive goalscoring form into September, with four goals in the space of three days in the club's 3–2 defeat to Eastleigh and 3–1 victory over Chesterfield.

=== Rochdale ===
On 27 January 2022, Campbell joined Rochdale on a two-and-a-half-year contract for an undisclosed fee. In an injury-hit spell, he managed 2 goals in 20 league appearances over 2 seasons.

=== Aldershot Town ===
In March 2023, Campbell joined Aldershot Town of the National League on loan until the end of the season. He netted 3 times in 9 appearances, helping them stay up in the division.

=== Wealdstone ===
In July 2023, Campbell signed for National League side Wealdstone on a season-long loan from Rochdale. In February 2024, having made 19 league appearance and scored 6 times, Campbell's loan was cut short by mutual consent.

=== Solihull Moors ===
On 4 February 2024, Campbell rejoined Solihull Moors for an undisclosed fee.

=== Yeovil Town ===
On 23 June 2025, Campbell returned to Yeovil Town on a permanent basis, signing a one-year deal with the National League side.

On 10 March 2026, Campbell joined fellow National League club Brackley Town on loan until the end of the season.

He was released by Yeovil Town at the end of the 2025–26 season.

=== Brackley Town ===
On 16 June 2026, Campbell returned to Brackley Town on a permanent deal.

== Career statistics ==
As of end of 2025–26 season

Appearances and goals by club, season and competition
Club	Season	League			FA Cup		League Cup		Other		Total	
Club	Season	Division	Apps	Goals	Apps	Goals	Apps	Goals	Apps	Goals	Apps	Goals
West Bromwich Albion	2015–16	Premier League	0	0	—		—		—		0	0
West Bromwich Albion	2016–17	Premier League	0	0	0	0	0	0	—		0	0
West Bromwich Albion	2017–18	Premier League	0	0	0	0	0	0	—		0	0
West Bromwich Albion	Total		0	0	0	0	0	0	—		0	0
Kidderminster Harriers (loan)	2015–16	National League	15	0	—		—		0	0	15	0
Yeovil Town (loan)	2015–16	League Two	17	1	1	0	0	0	0	0	18	1
Yeovil Town (loan)	2016–17	League Two	19	1	0	0	2	0	3 (Note: Appearance(s) in EFL Trophy)	0	24	1
Yeovil Town (loan)	Total		36	2	1	0	2	0	3	0	42	2
Notts County (loan)	2016–17	League Two	11	0	—		—		—		11	0
Solihull Moors (loan)	2017–18	National League	13	1	0	0	—		0	0	13	1
Forest Green Rovers (loan)	2017–18	League Two	14	2	—		—		0	0	14	2
Forest Green Rovers	2018–19	League Two	18	3	2	0	1	1	3	1	24	5
Forest Green Rovers	Total		32	5	2	0	1	1	3	1	38	7
Gillingham (loan)	2018–19	League One	6	0	—		—		—		6	0
Cheltenham Town	2019–20	League Two	11	0	0	0	1	0	2	0	14	0
Cheltenham Town	2020–21	League Two	0	0	1	0	0	0	0	0	1	0
Cheltenham Town	Total		11	0	2	0	1	0	2	0	15	0
Gloucester City (loan)	2020–21	National League North	5	2	—		—		2 (Note: Appearances in FA Trophy)	3	7	5
FC Halifax Town (loan)	2020–21	National League	15	1	—		—		—		15	1
Woking	2021–22	National League	21	13	1	0	—		1	1	23	14
Rochdale	2021–22	League Two	13	2	—		—		—		13	2
Rochdale	2022–23	League Two	7	0	0	0	0	0	1	1	8	1
Rochdale	2023–24	National League	0	0	0	0	—		0	0	0	0
Rochdale	Total		20	2	0	0	0	0	1	1	21	3
Aldershot Town (loan)	2022–23	National League	9	3	—		—		1	0	10	3
Wealdstone (loan)	2023–24	National League	19	6	1	0	—		2	2	22	8
Solihull Moors	2023–24	National League	16	7	—		—		3 (Note: Appearances in National League play-offs)	2	19	9
Solihull Moors	2024–25	National League	9	2	0	0	—		0	0	9	2
Solihull Moors	Total		25	9	0	0	—		3	2	28	11
Yeovil Town	2025–26	National League	33	3	1	0	—		4	1	38	4
Brackley Town (loan)	2025–26	National League	4	1	—		—		—		4	1
Career total			275	48	7	0	4	1	22	11	308	60
