= 2009 Football League Cup final =

- Event: 2008–09 Football League Cup
Manchester United	Tottenham Hotspur
0	0
- After extra time Manchester United won 4–1 on penalties
- Date: 1 March 2009
- Venue: Wembley Stadium, London
- Man of the Match: Ben Foster (Manchester United)
- Referee: Chris Foy (Merseyside)
- Attendance: 88,217
- Weather: Mostly cloudy 11 °C (52 °F)

The 2009 Football League Cup final was the final match of the 2008–09 Football League Cup, the 49th season of the Football League Cup, a football competition for the 92 teams in the Premier League and The Football League. The match was played at Wembley Stadium on 1 March 2009, and was contested by Tottenham Hotspur, who won the competition in 2008, and Manchester United, who last won the competition in 2006. The two joint-top goalscorers played for each of the finalists. Roman Pavlyuchenko of Tottenham Hotspur, who scored in every match in which he played in the tournament up to the final, and Manchester United's Carlos Tevez; both players had six goals each.

Manchester United won 4–1 on penalties, after the match ended as a goalless draw in normal time. United converted all four of their penalties, while Tottenham missed two of their three. It was only the second time that the League Cup final had been decided by a penalty shoot-out.

The man of the match was Manchester United goalkeeper Ben Foster, who became the first goalkeeper since Jerzy Dudek in 2003 to win the Alan Hardaker Trophy.

Retrospectively, the result of this game would have significant implications for the following season's UEFA Europa League. In winning the tournament, the qualifying spot for the League Cup went to the seventh-placed team in the Premier League by default, as Manchester United would later win the League and therefore qualified for the UEFA Champions League. Fulham, who finished seventh in the league, went on to progress to the final of the 2009–10 Europa League. Had Tottenham won the League Cup, they would have qualified in Fulham's place.

== Road to Wembley ==
Manchester United		Round	Tottenham Hotspur
Opponent	Result	Round	Opponent	Result
Middlesbrough (H)	3–1	Third round	Newcastle United (A)	2–1
Queens Park Rangers (H)	1–0	Fourth round	Liverpool (H)	4–2
Blackburn Rovers (H)	5–3	Fifth round	Watford (A)	2–1
Derby County	0–1 (A)	Semi-final	Burnley	4–1 (H)
Derby County	4–2 (H)	Semi-final	Burnley	2–3 (A)
Manchester United won 4–3 on aggregate		Semi-final	Tottenham Hotspur won 6–4 on aggregate

== Match ==
=== Team selection ===
Sir Alex Ferguson promised before the game that he would give places in the Manchester United starting line-up to the young players who had played a part in getting them to the final, with Darron Gibson in the centre of midfield and Danny Welbeck up front. He also said he would make several changes from the team that drew away to Internazionale in the Champions League earlier in the week, citing the need to rotate players in the modern game. Goalkeeper Ben Foster, who had played in the fifth round against Blackburn Rovers and the second leg of the semi-final against Derby County, expressed a desire to play in the final as a way of making up for an injury-beset previous 12 months.

Tottenham manager Harry Redknapp named Heurelho Gomes as his goalkeeper for the final, despite the Brazilian having made several high-profile errors, as the club's number-one 'keeper, Carlo Cudicini, was cup-tied; Cudicini was signed from Chelsea during the January transfer window and had appeared for the Blues in the League Cup earlier in the season. Defender Jonathan Woodgate, who scored the winning goal in the 2008 final, suffered a head wound in a 2–1 win over Hull City the week before the game; he declared himself fit the next day, but was ultimately left out of the squad. Striker Roman Pavlyuchenko, however, was selected for the game, despite his earlier fears that he might miss out if Redknapp opted to play Darren Bent as a lone striker; in the end, Pavlyuchenko and Bent started together up front.

=== Details ===
1 March 2009
15:00 GMT

Manchester United	0–0 (a.e.t.)	Tottenham Hotspur
	Report
Penalties
Giggs (penalty scored); Tevez (penalty scored); Ronaldo (penalty scored); Anderson (penalty scored)	4–1	(penalty missed) O'Hara; (penalty scored) Ćorluka; (penalty missed) Bentley

Wembley Stadium, London
Attendance: 88,217
Referee: Chris Foy (Merseyside)

Manchester United	Tottenham Hotspur

GK	12	(England) Ben Foster
RB	22	(Republic of Ireland) John O'Shea	(yellow card) 57'	(substituted off) 76'
CB	5	(England) Rio Ferdinand (c)
CB	23	(Northern Ireland) Jonny Evans
LB	3	(France) Patrice Evra
RM	7	(Portugal) Cristiano Ronaldo	(yellow card) 67'
CM	28	(Republic of Ireland) Darron Gibson		(substituted off) 91'
CM	18	(England) Paul Scholes	(yellow card) 108'
LM	17	(Portugal) Nani
CF	19	(England) Danny Welbeck		(substituted off) 56'
CF	32	(Argentina) Carlos Tevez
Substitutes:
GK	29	(Poland) Tomasz Kuszczak
DF	15	(Serbia) Nemanja Vidić		(substituted on) 76'
DF	42	(England) Richard Eckersley
MF	8	(Brazil) Anderson		(substituted on) 56'
MF	11	(Wales) Ryan Giggs		(substituted on) 91'
MF	13	(South Korea) Park Ji-sung
MF	34	(Brazil) Rodrigo Possebon
Manager:
(Scotland) Sir Alex Ferguson

GK	1	(Brazil) Heurelho Gomes
RB	22	(Croatia) Vedran Ćorluka
CB	20	(England) Michael Dawson
CB	26	(England) Ledley King (c)
LB	32	(Cameroon) Benoît Assou-Ekotto
RM	7	(England) Aaron Lennon	(substituted off) 102'
CM	8	(England) Jermaine Jenas	(substituted off) 98'
CM	4	(Ivory Coast) Didier Zokora
LM	14	(Croatia) Luka Modrić
CF	10	(England) Darren Bent
CF	9	(Russia) Roman Pavlyuchenko	(substituted off) 65'
Substitutes:
GK	27	(England) Ben Alnwick
DF	3	(Wales) Gareth Bale	(substituted on) 98'
DF	16	(Wales) Chris Gunter
MF	5	(England) David Bentley	(substituted on) 102'
MF	6	(England) Tom Huddlestone
MF	19	(Morocco) Adel Taarabt
MF	24	(England) Jamie O'Hara	(substituted on) 65'
Manager:
(England) Harry Redknapp

Man of the Match
Ben Foster (Manchester United)

Assistant referees:
Peter Kirkup (Northamptonshire)
Andy Butler (Lancashire)
Fourth official:
Andre Marriner (West Midlands)
Reserve assistant referee:
Robert Pollock (Merseyside)

Match rules

- 90 minutes.
- 30 minutes of extra time if necessary.
- Penalty shoot-out if scores still level.
- Seven named substitutes.
- Maximum of three substitutions.

=== Statistics ===
Statistic	Manchester United	Tottenham Hotspur
Total shots	23	12
Shots on target	10	7
Ball possession	53%	47%
Corner kicks	9	4
Fouls committed	12	16
Offsides	2	2
Yellow cards	3	0
Red cards	0	0
