= Ben Foster (footballer) =

English footballer (born 1983)

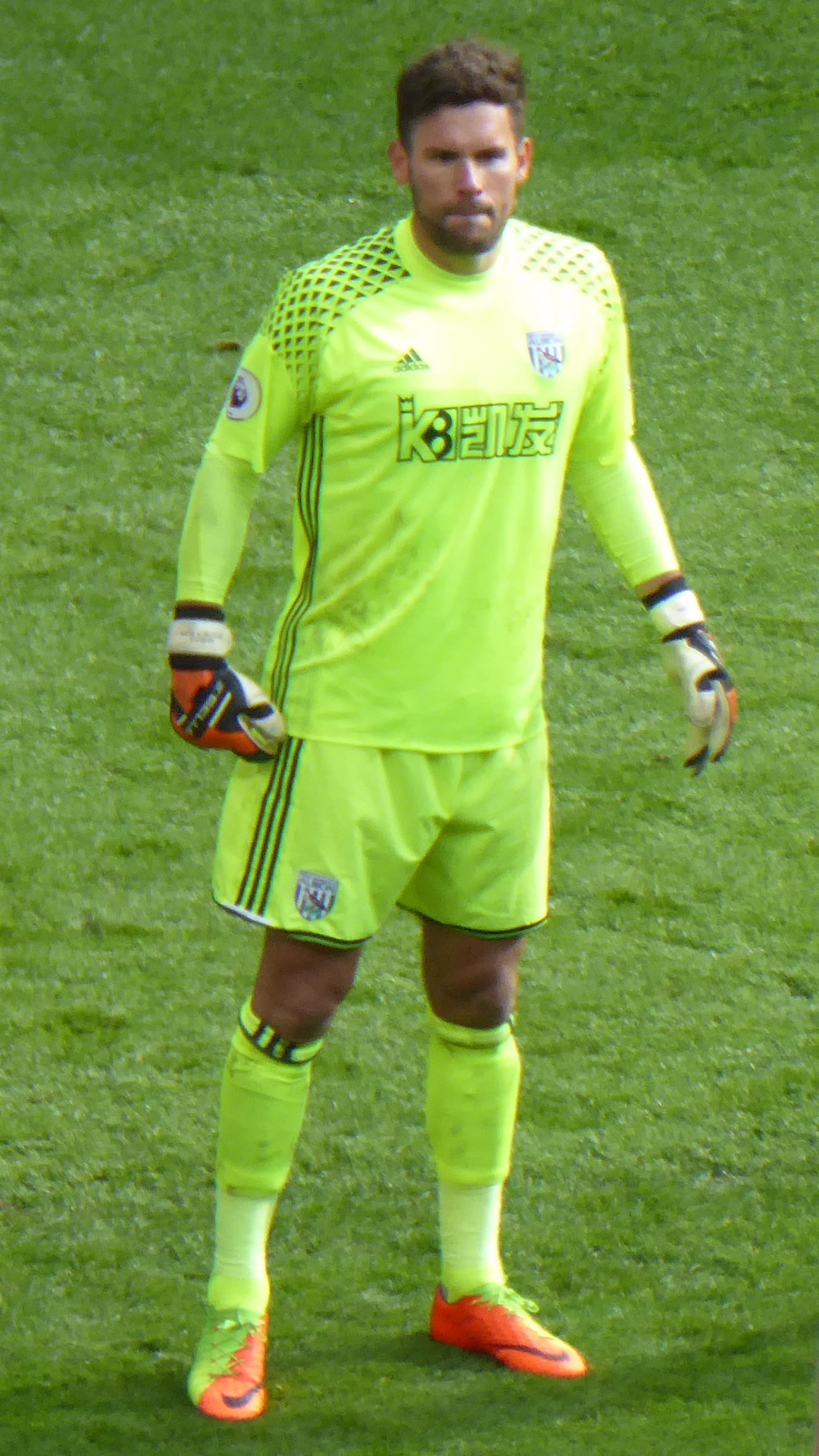
- Foster playing for West Bromwich Albion in 2017

Personal information
- Full name: Ben Anthony Foster
- Date of birth: 3 April 1983 (age 43)
- Place of birth: Leamington Spa, England
- Height: 6 ft 4 in (1.93 m)
- Position: Goalkeeper

Youth career
- –2000: Racing Club Warwick

Senior career*
Years	Team	Apps	(Gls)
2000–2001	Racing Club Warwick		
2001–2005	Stoke City	0	(0)
2002	→ Bristol City (loan)	0	(0)
2002–2003	→ Tiverton Town (loan)	16	(0)
2004	→ Stafford Rangers (loan)	1	(0)
2004	→ Kidderminster Harriers (loan)	2	(0)
2005	→ Wrexham (loan)	17	(0)
2005–2010	Manchester United	12	(0)
2005–2006	→ Watford (loan)	44	(0)
2006–2007	→ Watford (loan)	29	(0)
2010–2012	Birmingham City	38	(0)
2011–2012	→ West Bromwich Albion (loan)	37	(0)
2012–2018	West Bromwich Albion	172	(0)
2018–2022	Watford	125	(0)
2023	Wrexham	12	(0)
Total		505	(0)

International career
2007–2014	England	8	(0)
- * Club domestic league appearances and goals

Ben Anthony Foster (born 3 April 1983) is an English former professional footballer who played as a goalkeeper.

Foster began his professional career in 2001 with Stoke City, having joined from Racing Club Warwick. However, he never made an appearance for Stoke, and spent time on loan with Bristol City, Tiverton Town, Stafford Rangers, Kidderminster Harriers, and Wrexham. He switched permanently to Manchester United in July 2005, but again struggled to break into the first team, and spent two successive seasons on loan to Watford from August 2005 until the end of the 2006–07 season.

Having played just 23 times for Manchester United (although he also played in the League Cup-winning teams of 2009 and 2010), Foster switched to Birmingham City in May 2010. An ever-present in the league for Birmingham, he was also part of the Birmingham team that won the 2011 League Cup. Following Birmingham's relegation to the Championship at the end of the season, he was loaned to West Bromwich Albion, and moved there permanently in June 2012. He returned to Watford in July 2018. He announced his retirement from football in September 2022 before returning to Wrexham in March 2023. He again retired in August 2023 after helping Wrexham to the National League title.

Foster made his international debut for England in February 2007 against Spain. Although he announced his retirement from international football in May 2011, he returned in February 2013, and was selected in England's squad for the 2014 FIFA World Cup. He also runs a YouTube channel, "The Cycling GK", and The Fozcast podcast.

== Club career ==
=== Stoke City ===
Foster was born in Leamington Spa, Warwickshire. He started his football career as a youngster at Racing Club Warwick of the Southern League Division One West. He became their first-choice goalkeeper in December 2000, and was also training as an apprentice chef at Café Rouge in Leamington Spa.

In April 2001 Foster turned professional with Second Division club Stoke City after being spotted by scout Colin Dobson. He signed a one-year contract with an option for a further two years; the "five-figure" fee was undisclosed, and RC Warwick would benefit from the inclusion of a sell-on clause. During his time at Stoke, He had loan spells at Bristol City, Tiverton Town, Stafford Rangers, Kidderminster Harriers and Wrexham. He sustained a cruciate ligament injury in June 2003 while playing tennis with his brother, which sidelined him for a period of six months. After his recovery, He was awarded the number 14 shirt and received his maiden call up to the Potters' first team for a First Division match versus Wimbledon on 17 January 2004. He remained on the bench for the 1–0 victory and was an unused substitute on a further six occasions during the remainder of the 2003–04 season. He was called into the first team squad for four matches during the 2004–05 season.

=== Manchester United ===
While playing for Wrexham on loan from Stoke, Foster was spotted by Manchester United manager Alex Ferguson, who was watching Foster's teammate and his son, Darren, in the 2005 Football League Trophy final. United had been struggling for several years to replace former goalkeeper Peter Schmeichel, and Ferguson decided to move for the young Foster, making a bid of £1 million for the player. Stoke agreed a deal with United on 15 July 2005, and the transfer was completed on 19 July.

==== Loan to Watford ====
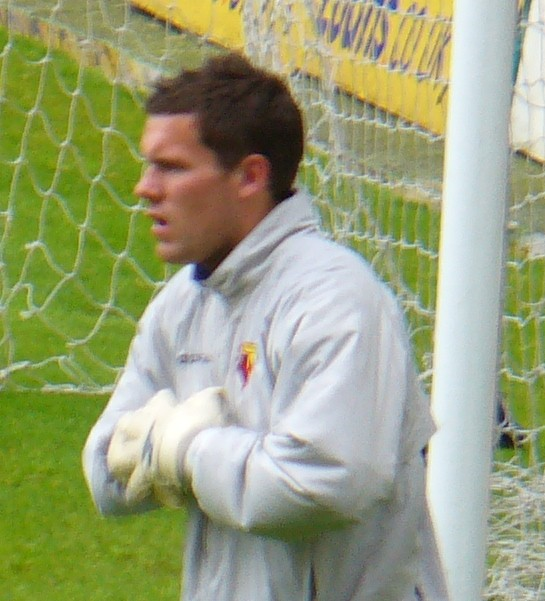
Foster training with Watford in 2007

Not ready for first team action, Foster was sent on a season-long loan to Watford on 1 August 2005, with the expectation of a second loan the season after. Watford manager Aidy Boothroyd claimed that "he's better than current Manchester United goalkeeper Edwin van der Sar" and claimed Foster would be "the best goalkeeper in the world". Manchester United manager Ferguson suggested that Foster would succeed Van der Sar as first-choice keeper at United and eventually replace Paul Robinson as "England's next goalkeeper". Foster helped Watford reach the Premier League by beating Leeds United 3–0 in the Championship play-off final.

He re-signed for Watford on a second season-long loan on 10 August 2006 after Manchester United secured the services of Poland international goalkeeper Tomasz Kuszczak on loan from West Bromwich Albion. Foster's performances during Watford's Premier League campaign earnt him the club's Player of the Season award. Aidy Boothroyd expressed his desire to keep Foster at Watford for a third season on a number of occasions during the 2006–07 season, but his hopes were dashed in January 2007 when Alex Ferguson announced his intention to bring Foster back to Old Trafford at the end of the season.

==== Return to Manchester United ====
In June 2007, it was announced that Foster would undergo surgery on a cruciate ligament injury in his right knee, forcing him to miss the start of the 2007–08 season. He returned to light training towards the end of 2007, setting a February 2008 target for his return. He made a comeback in a reserve match against Middlesbrough on 6 March 2008, before making his debut for the Manchester United first team on 15 March 2008. With Edwin van der Sar injured and Tomasz Kuszczak suspended for a red card against Portsmouth in the FA Cup sixth round the previous Saturday, Alex Ferguson had to shelve plans to ship Foster out on loan again, and the young goalkeeper was started for the away match against Derby County. United won the match 1–0, with Foster making two crucial saves en route to keeping a clean sheet. Although he was impressed with Foster's performance in the match against Derby, Ferguson did not start him for the following match against Bolton Wanderers, opting for the returning Kuszczak.

After being selected as a substitute for Manchester United's opening match of the 2008–09 Champions League against Villarreal on 17 September 2008, Foster then played for the reserves against Blackburn Rovers the following day. During the match, he fell awkwardly and suffered a twisted ankle, putting him out of contention for six to eight weeks. Fortunately for Foster, his recovery time was quicker than was first estimated and he returned to reserve team action on 14 October 2008, playing the full 90 minutes in a 2–1 win over Oldham Athletic reserves. Foster then made his first Champions League appearance – his second for the Manchester United first team – on 5 November 2008, in a 1–1 away draw to Celtic.

Foster was originally selected in Manchester United's squad for the 2008 FIFA Club World Cup, but after suffering a broken finger in training the day before the squad was due to depart for Japan, he was replaced by Ben Amos. On 1 March 2009, Alex Ferguson named Foster in goal for the 2009 League Cup final at Wembley Stadium. After keeping a clean sheet in normal time, Foster then made a save from Tottenham's Jamie O'Hara in the consequent penalty shoot-out. This, combined with a miss from David Bentley, gave United a 4–1 win in the shootout and the 2009 League Cup title. After the match, Foster was given the Alan Hardaker Trophy for his man of the match performance.

It was revealed after the match that Foster had used an iPod to help with his preparations in the penalty shootout, prompting discussion about the use of technology in the match.

Foster was rewarded for his performance by being made United's second-choice goalkeeper for the remainder of the season, starting three more matches when Alex Ferguson chose to rest Edwin van der Sar ahead of important matches. However, he had been attempting to play with a ruptured ligament in his right thumb, which became aggravated, necessitating surgery which ruled him out of United's title run-in, the Champions League final against Barcelona and England's 2010 World Cup qualifiers in June. Following speculation that United were in the market for a new goalkeeper to replace the soon-to-retire Edwin van der Sar, Foster signed a new four-year contract with the club. Alex Ferguson commented that Manchester United "genuinely see him [Foster] as a successor to Edwin van der Sar".

With Van der Sar injured for the first two months of the 2009–10 season, Foster was given the opportunity to nail down the number one shirt in the 2009 FA Community Shield defeat to Chelsea, where his mistakes led to two Chelsea goals and made no saves in the penalty shootout. Foster continued to play in the League, starting with the opening day victory over Birmingham City. In wins against Arsenal and Manchester City, Foster received heavy criticism for errors that led to opposition goals. Manager Alex Ferguson stated that he believes in Foster's abilities and potential; however, eight days later, Foster was again criticised for a mistake which led to a Sunderland goal in a 2–2 draw, and left out of the England squad the next day with bruised ribs. However, following Robert Green's red card in the match against Ukraine and consequent suspension, Foster was given the all-clear by doctors and recalled to the England squad for the match against Belarus on 14 October. Foster played only twice more in 2009 for Manchester United after the Sunderland match: a League Cup win against Championship team Barnsley, and a Champions League tie versus Beşiktaş, with Manchester United's progress from the group already secured. He was displaced from the first team in Van der Sar's absence by Tomasz Kuszczak, and on occasion, reserve goalkeeper Ben Amos took Foster's place on the substitutes bench. Foster started his first match for three months against West Ham in February 2010, keeping a clean sheet in a 3–0 victory.

=== Birmingham City ===
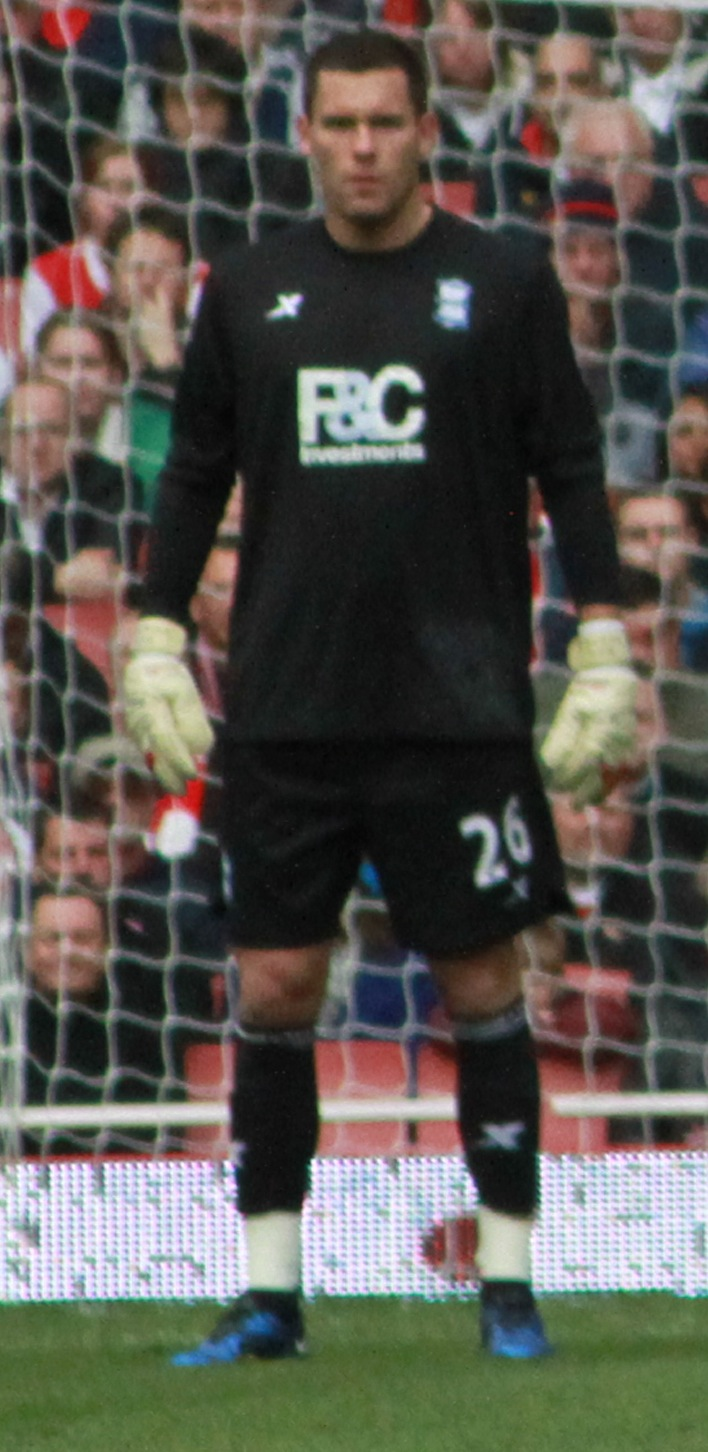
Foster playing for Birmingham City in 2010

After accepting that in order to play regularly he needed to leave Manchester, whether on loan or permanently, Foster signed a three-year contract with Premier League club Birmingham City on 19 May 2010. The fee was not disclosed, though media speculation suggested an initial fee of £4 million, potentially rising to £6 million with add-ons. The club were seeking a replacement for Foster's fellow England international goalkeeper Joe Hart, who had returned to Manchester City after a successful 2009–10 season on loan at Birmingham. Foster made his Birmingham debut on the opening day of the 2010–11 season in a 2–2 draw away to Sunderland. On his home debut the following week against Blackburn Rovers, he saved a penalty from Morten Gamst Pedersen as Birmingham won the match 2–1.

Criticised for an error in England's 2–1 defeat to France, Foster produced a man-of-the-match performance on his return to League duty on 20 November as Birmingham beat reigning champions Chelsea 1–0. Though Chelsea had 32 shots at goal, Foster made a series of excellent saves, including one described by BBC Sport as "staggering" to deny Didier Drogba's "fierce close-range downward header". He made a "horrendous blunder" in the televised League Cup semi-final, allowing a soft shot from Carlton Cole to slip underneath him, which gave West Ham United a 2–1 lead after the first leg. Birmingham still reached the final, and Foster's display earned him the Alan Hardaker Trophy for the second time in three years, as his team defeated Arsenal 2–1 to claim their first major trophy in 48 years. They were relegated to the Championship on the final day of the season. Because of his "series of inspirational performances", Foster was named Birmingham's Player of the Season and Players' Player of the Season for 2010–11.

=== West Bromwich Albion ===
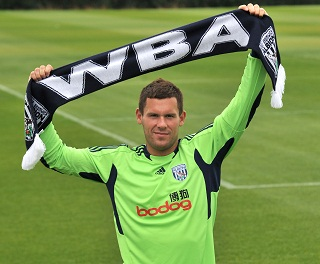
Foster at his presentation as a West Bromwich Albion player in 2011

Foster joined Premier League club West Bromwich Albion on 29 July 2011, changing places with Albion goalkeeper Boaz Myhill, both players signing a loan deal for the whole of the 2011–12 season. Foster played in 37 of their 38 league matches, only missing the final match of the season with a minor groin strain. He kept 10 league clean sheets, equalling West Brom's Premier League clean sheets record, as the club finished in 10th place, their highest league finish in 30 years. At the end of the season, Foster was given the supporters' player of the year and the players' player of the year awards.

On 29 June 2012, Foster signed permanently with West Brom for an undisclosed fee, widely reported to be £4 million. He signed a three-year contract with an option for a further two years in the club's favour. Foster continued to perform impressively in his second season with the club, keeping 7 clean sheets in 30 league matches, and helping to guide West Brom to their record high Premier League position of 8th for the 2012–13 season. A highlight of that season was saving a Steven Gerrard penalty against Liverpool at Anfield. The score was 0–0 at the time and West Brom went on to win 2–0. Despite missing 4 months of the following season through injury, Foster went on to win both fans player, and player's player of the year awards for the second time in three years after a series of impressive performances throughout the 2013–14 season. Foster's impressive form for the club saw him called up to the 2014 England World Cup squad, becoming the first West Bromwich Albion player to represent England in a world cup squad since Jeff Astle in 1970.

After an impressive 2016–17 season, Foster was nominated for the Football Writers' Association Footballer of the Year award. He was also the West Brom supporters' club player of the season.

=== Return to Watford ===
After West Brom's relegation to the Championship, Foster re-signed for Premier League club Watford on 5 July 2018 on a two-year contract, with the option of an additional year, for an undisclosed fee. He immediately overtook Brazilian teammate Heurelho Gomes to the Watford number one shirt and remained Watford's first-choice goalkeeper after their relegation from the Premier League in 2020. Foster signed a further two-year contract with Watford in June 2020. On 16 May 2022, Foster revealed he would be leaving the club at the end of his contract in June.

=== Return to Wrexham ===
On 15 September 2022, Foster announced his retirement from football at the age of 39 after turning down a contract offer from Newcastle United. On 23 March 2023, he came out of retirement to sign a short-term contract with National League club Wrexham following an injury to Rob Lainton. He made his second debut for Wrexham two days later in a 3–0 home win over York City. This was his first appearance for Wrexham in 17 years and 310 days, the longest gap between two appearances in the club's history. On 10 April, he saved a penalty in stoppage time to secure a 3–2 win over Notts County, which helped his club to go three points clear of Notts County in the National League title race. On 22 April, Wrexham secured promotion to League Two and were confirmed as champions of the National League after a 3–1 win over Boreham Wood.

Foster signed a new one-year contract with Wrexham on 9 June 2023. On 20 August, following a 5–5 draw at home to Swindon Town, Foster announced his retirement from professional football, believing he was no longer able to play at his best and that it was costing his team to concede goals. He played his last match for the club at the age of 40 years and 4 months, thus becoming the oldest recorded Wrexham player in a league match and the second oldest overall, only behind Bobby Roberts.

== International career ==
On 26 May 2006, Foster was named on the stand-by list for England's 2006 World Cup squad, because of Robert Green's injury in a "B" international against Belarus. After Foster re-signed on loan for Watford, he was called up to Steve McClaren's first England squad as one of three goalkeepers for the friendly against Greece. Since his first call-up but prior to his injury, Foster was named in every England squad, and made his England debut in the 1–0 defeat against Spain on 7 February 2007.

After not playing for England for two years and never being called to the first team, he was finally selected by Fabio Capello after his performance during the League Cup Final and earned his second cap as a second-half substitute in a 4–0 victory over Slovakia. Inconsistent performances in Manchester United's first fixtures of the 2009–10 season, as well as bruised ribs, meant that Foster was left out of Capello's initial squad for their final two World Cup qualifiers. However, after Robert Green was sent off in the match against Ukraine on 10 October, Foster was recalled in his place for the following match against Belarus. It had been expected that David James would take Green's place in the starting line-up, but James was injured in the warm-up and Foster was given his third England cap instead. England won the match 3–0, with Foster making a one-handed save from Syarhey Amelyanchuk in the 63rd minute. Foster won his fourth cap against Brazil, where he played the whole match in a 1–0 loss on 14 November 2009, the friendly match was played in Qatar, with forward Nilmar scoring the only goal of the match from a header in the 47th minute. He was overlooked for England's 2010 World Cup squad, Joe Hart being preferred for the third goalkeeping spot.

Foster stated in a 2020 interview that he found Capello difficult to work with, not only as a manager but also as a person. Foster had been training with England for a friendly match when his pregnant wife went into labour. Capello initially refused to allow Foster to leave for his child's birth, before reluctantly allowing it only after Foster pleaded with him. Three hours after his child's birth, Capello called Foster and urged him to return to the training camp immediately, promising Foster that he would play the second half of the upcoming match. Ultimately, Foster was not brought on in the second half and played no role in the match; Capello offered no acknowledgement or explanation to Foster. Shortly after, in May 2011, Foster announced that he would be making himself unavailable for international selection for an indefinite period. He intended to "prolong [his] club career for as long as possible" by allowing his body "a proper rest period between games" to reduce "niggling" injuries. It was not until February 2013 – after Capello had been succeeded by Roy Hodgson – that he made himself available for selection again. In the next international break, he was called up to the England squad for World Cup qualifiers against San Marino and Montenegro. On 29 May 2013 Foster represented England in a friendly fixture against the Republic of Ireland.

Foster was selected in the final 23 for England's 2014 World Cup squad, and played in the 2–2 draw with Ecuador in preparation for the tournament. With England unable to advance to the last 16, he played the whole 90 minutes of the last group match against Costa Rica, and kept a clean sheet in the 0–0 draw in Belo Horizonte.

== Online media ==
Ben Foster - The Cycling GK
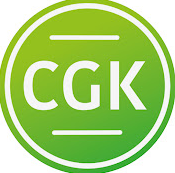

YouTube information
- Channel: Ben Foster - The Cycling GK
- Years active: 2020–present
- Subscribers: 1.44 million
- Views: 170 million
- Last updated: March 2026

Foster has a verified YouTube channel called "Ben Foster – The Cycling GK", which he started in 2020 during the UK's COVID-19 lockdown. He posts cycling videos and matchday vlogs, including GoPro footage of the games in the back of his goal; he occasionally wears an Insta360 camera fastened to his chest to provide a first-person viewpoint. As of April 2023, the channel has amassed over 1.43 million subscribers and over 138 million views.

He also has a podcast called "Fozcast – The Ben Foster Podcast", which he hosts with Tom Ochoa. Foster also has a golf channel called "The Golfing GK", and hosts a debate show on his channel called "The Football Fill-In", which began during the 2022–23 Premier League season.

== Personal life ==
Foster attended North Leamington School in Leamington Spa, Warwickshire.

Foster lives with his wife and two children in a house he helped design on a 30-acre farm in Henley-in-Arden, Warwickshire. He is an enthusiastic cyclist.

In March 2022, Foster was fined £2,250 and banned from driving for six months after he was caught driving at 99 mph (159 km/h) on the M40, an offence he committed in April 2021.

== Career statistics ==
=== Club ===
Appearances and goals by club, season and competition
Club	Season	League			FA Cup		League Cup		Europe		Other		Total	
Club	Season	Division	Apps	Goals	Apps	Goals	Apps	Goals	Apps	Goals	Apps	Goals	Apps	Goals
Stoke City	2001–02	Second Division	0	0	0	0	0	0	—		0	0	0	0
Stoke City	2002–03	First Division	0	0	—		0	0	—		—		0	0
Stoke City	2003–04	First Division	0	0	0	0	0	0	—		—		0	0
Stoke City	2004–05	Championship	0	0	0	0	0	0	—		—		0	0
Stoke City	Total		0	0	0	0	0	0	—		0	0	0	0
Bristol City (loan)	2002–03	Second Division	0	0	0	0	—		—		0	0	0	0
Tiverton Town (loan)	2002–03	Southern League Premier Division	16	0	—		—		—		—		16	0
Stafford Rangers (loan)	2003–04	Southern League Premier Division	1	0	—		—		—		—		1	0
Kidderminster Harriers (loan)	2004–05	League Two	2	0	—		—		—		—		2	0
Wrexham (loan)	2004–05	League One	17	0	—		—		—		4 (Note: Appearances in Football League Trophy)	0	21	0
Manchester United	2007–08	Premier League	1	0	0	0	0	0	0	0	0	0	1	0
Manchester United	2008–09	Premier League	2	0	3	0	3	0	1 (Note: Appearance(s) in UEFA Champions League)	0	0	0	9	0
Manchester United	2009–10	Premier League	9	0	0	0	1	0	2	0	1 (Note: Appearance in FA Community Shield)	0	13	0
Manchester United	Total		12	0	3	0	4	0	3	0	1	0	23	0
Watford (loan)	2005–06	Championship	44	0	1	0	0	0	—		3 (Note: Appearances in Championship play-offs)	0	48	0
Watford (loan)	2006–07	Premier League	29	0	3	0	1	0	—		—		33	0
Watford (loan)	Total		73	0	4	0	1	0	—		3	0	81	0
Birmingham City	2010–11	Premier League	38	0	1	0	4	0	—		—		43	0
West Bromwich Albion (loan)	2011–12	Premier League	37	0	2	0	0	0	—		—		39	0
West Bromwich Albion	2012–13	Premier League	30	0	0	0	1	0	—		—		31	0
West Bromwich Albion	2013–14	Premier League	24	0	1	0	0	0	—		—		25	0
West Bromwich Albion	2014–15	Premier League	28	0	2	0	0	0	—		—		30	0
West Bromwich Albion	2015–16	Premier League	15	0	4	0	0	0	—		—		19	0
West Bromwich Albion	2016–17	Premier League	38	0	0	0	0	0	—		—		38	0
West Bromwich Albion	2017–18	Premier League	37	0	3	0	1	0	—		—		41	0
West Bromwich Albion	Total		209	0	12	0	2	0	—		—		223	0
Watford	2018–19	Premier League	38	0	0	0	0	0	—		—		38	0
Watford	2019–20	Premier League	38	0	0	0	0	0	—		—		38	0
Watford	2020–21	Championship	23	0	0	0	0	0	—		—		23	0
Watford	2021–22	Premier League	26	0	0	0	1	0	—		—		27	0
Watford	Total		125	0	0	0	1	0	—		—		126	0
Wrexham	2022–23	National League	8	0	—		—		—		—		8	0
Wrexham	2023–24	League Two	4	0	—		0	0	—		—		4	0
Wrexham	Total		12	0	—		0	0	—		—		12	0
Career total			505	0	20	0	11	0	3	0	8	0	547	0

=== International ===
Appearances and goals by national team and year
National team	Year	Apps	Goals
England	2007	1	0
England	2008	0	0
England	2009	3	0
England	2010	1	0
England	2011	0	0
England	2012	0	0
England	2013	1	0
England	2014	2	0
Total		8	0

== Honours ==
Wrexham

- National League: 2022–23
- Football League Trophy: 2004–05

Watford

- Football League Championship play-offs: 2006
- FA Cup runner-up: 2018–19

Manchester United

- Football League Cup: 2008–09, 2009–10

Birmingham City

- Football League Cup: 2010–11

Individual

- Watford Player of the Season: 2006–07
- Alan Hardaker Trophy: 2009, 2011
- Birmingham City Player of the Season: 2010–11
- Birmingham City Players' Player of the Season: 2010–11
- West Bromwich Albion Supporters' Player of the Season: 2011–12, 2013–14, 2016–17, 2017–18
- West Bromwich Albion Players' Player of the Season: 2011–12, 2013–14
- London Football Awards Goalkeeper of the Year: 2019
