= St James' Catholic High School, Colindale =

St James' Catholic High School

Location
- Great Strand; Colindale, London, NW9 5PE; England; 51.600°N 0.242°W

Information
- Type: Voluntary aided school
- Religious affiliation: Roman Catholic
- Established: 1934
- Local authority: Barnet
- Specialists: Science and sports
- Department for Education URN: 101364 Tables
- Ofsted: Reports
- Headteacher: Anthony Ellul
- Age: 11 to 18
- Website: http://www.st-james.barnet.sch.uk/

St James Catholic High School is voluntary aided mixed sex school for students from 11 to 18 years of age. It was founded by the Dominican sisters in 1934. Today it operates from one site in Colindale, Barnet in North London, England. The current headteacher is Mr Anthony Ellul.

== History ==
The Dominican Sisters of the Congregation of St Catherine of Siena of Newcastle (Natal) in South Africa led the way in setting up St Rose's Convent Orange Hill Road in Burnt Oak (north London) in February 1930. This was an independent school where children stayed on in education until the age of 14.

This led to the foundation of St James' Catholic Central School in 1934, and amalgamated with St Rose's School with Sr Mary Catherine Walsh as the first Headteacher (1934–69). This was in response to Cardinal Bourne, Archbishop of Westminster. Bourne had noticed that the new Watling housing estate had been built in north London by the London County Council intended to provide better quality housing for people then living in Islington and other parts of inner London - many of which lived in poor and sub-standard accommodation. Thus there was an opportunity to provide Catholic secondary education for the families of the Catholic parishes of north-west London.

When it was set up, St James was the only mixed, although separated by single sex in the classroom setting, non-selective Catholic school in London. The other Catholic Secondary schools were single sex, selective and generally fee paying. In 1949 a further expansion followed when St. Thomas' Independent School in Stanmore was annexed to St. James'. In 1997 the school was reunited on one site in Colindale, and in 2004 it became a specialist Science and Sports College.

== Headteachers ==
The current headteacher is Mr Anthony Ellul. The former headteacher was Mrs. Niamh Arnull (2017–2022). The previous headteachers have been Sr Mary Catherine Walsh (1934–1969), Sr Veronica Desmond O.P (1969–1984), Sr Mary Raymunda Jordan O.P (1984–1992), Mr. Kevin McSharry (1992–2005), Mrs. Anne O'Shea (2005–2010), Mrs. Niamh Arnull (2010–2017) and Mrs. Carolyn Laws (2017–2022).

== Alumni ==
- James Hanratty (1936–1962) - executed by hanging for the A6 murder. Forensic evidence from the later post-mortum proved that he was guilty.
- Shaun Donnellan (b. 1996) - professional footballer, Torquay United F.C.
- Rio Kyerematen (b. 2005) - academy footballer, Tottenham Hotspur F.C.
