= Gareth McAuley =

Northern Irish footballer (born 1979)

Gareth McAuley MBE
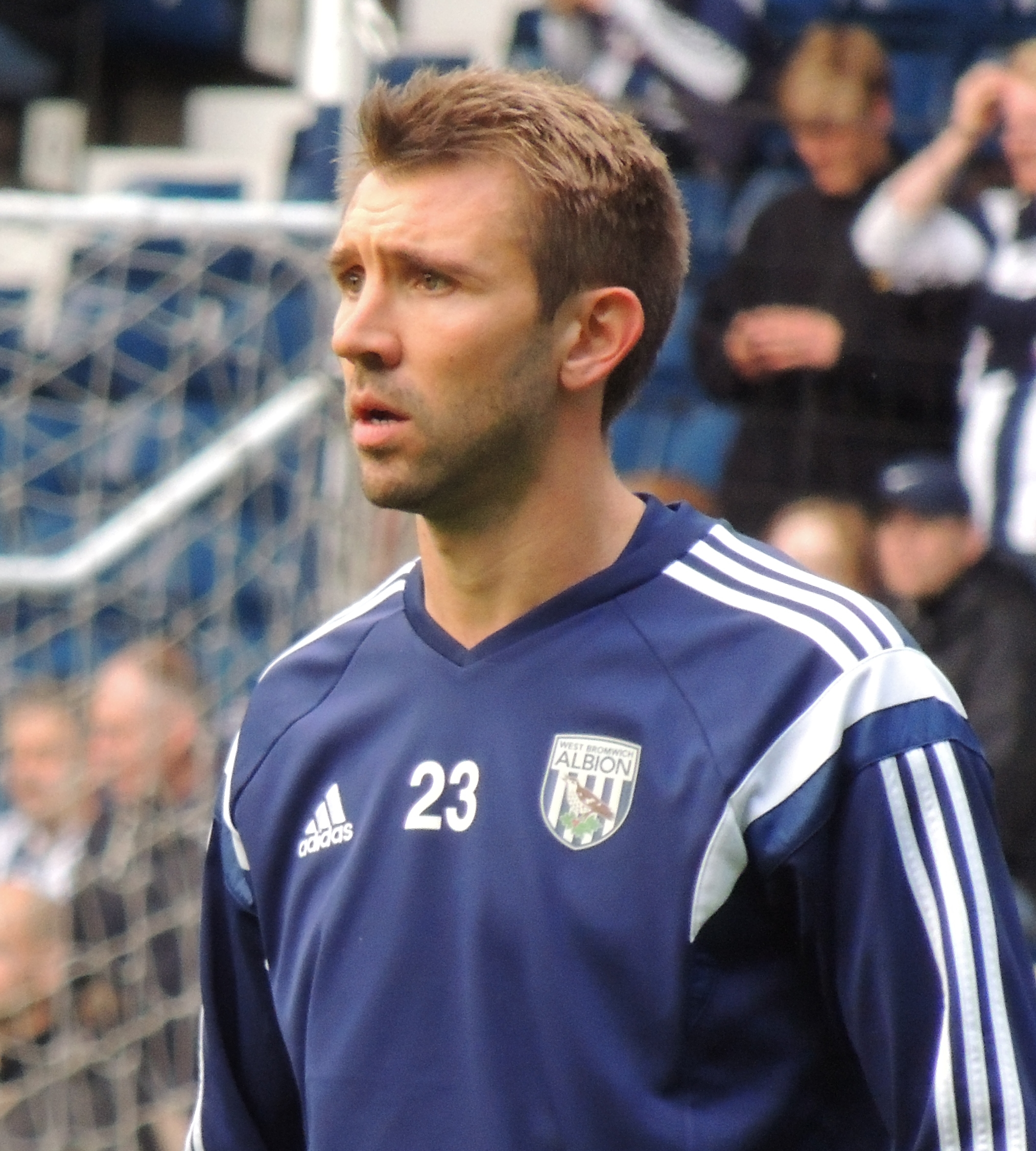
- McAuley with West Bromwich Albion in 2014

Personal information
- Full name: Gareth Gerald McAuley
- Date of birth: 5 December 1979 (age 46)
- Place of birth: Larne, Northern Ireland
- Height: 6 ft 5 in (1.95 m)
- Position: Centre back

Youth career
- Lisburn Youth
- 1994–1999: Linfield

Senior career*
Years	Team	Apps	(Gls)
1999–2000	Linfield	0	(0)
1999–2000	→ Ballyclare Comrades (loan)	7	(0)
2000–2002	Crusaders	64	(3)
2002–2004	Coleraine	63	(4)
2004–2006	Lincoln City	72	(8)
2006–2008	Leicester City	74	(5)
2008–2011	Ipswich Town	115	(7)
2011–2018	West Bromwich Albion	203	(15)
2018–2019	Rangers	7	(0)
Total		605	(42)

International career
2003	Northern Ireland B	1	(0)
2005–2018	Northern Ireland	80	(9)

Managerial career
- 2023–: Northern Ireland U19
- * Club domestic league appearances and goals

Gareth Gerald McAuley MBE (/məˈkɔːli/ mə-KAW-lee; born 5 December 1979) is a Northern Irish former professional footballer who played as a centre back. He represented Northern Ireland at senior international level, being capped on 80 occasions and scoring nine times. He is the manager of the Northern Ireland national under-19 football team.

McAuley began his career playing in Northern Irish football with Linfield, Ballyclare Comrades, Crusaders and Coleraine before joining English side Lincoln City in the summer of 2004. He impressed enough at Sincil Bank to earn a move to Championship side Leicester City. He moved on to Ipswich Town in June 2008 following Leicester's relegation and then on to Premier League side West Bromwich Albion in July 2011. McAuley won West Brom's player of the year award for the 2012–13 season.

== Club career ==
=== Early career ===
McAuley was born in Larne, County Antrim. He started out playing for Lisburn Youth being picked up by Linfield and spent some time in early 2000 on loan at Ballyclare Comrades. After four years at Linfield, he moved to Crusaders in the summer of 2000. After two successful seasons, he moved to Coleraine.

=== Lincoln City ===
In the summer of 2004, McAuley decided the time had come to look for a move into full-time football in the Football League. After attracting interest from Lincoln City and Stockport County he linked up with Edgeley Park based club for a two-week trial under the eye of the former Northern Ireland manager Sammy McIlroy who had given McAuley his first Northern Ireland B call-up. After impressing in his trial, McAuley seemed set to sign for Stockport but talks broke down and he instead joined Lincoln City on a two-year deal with Coleraine receiving £10,000 for his services. With Lincoln already boasting one of the strongest defences in League Two at the time of McAuley's arrival, he did not walk straight into the first team. His first few appearances for the club were all as a substitute, and often in the role of a target man striker.

However, when Dean West was dropped from the squad and club captain Paul Morgan sidelined with an injury, McAuley moved into central defence to partner Ben Futcher. He immediately drew the plaudits for his excellent performances, which included a man of the match display against Derby County. He thereafter battled for a starting centre back role with fellow giant Jamie McCombe for much of the season.

However, in March 2005, McAuley earned a starting role as the right full-back, replacing the perpetually out of form fan favourite Matt Bloomer. He continued to play in this position for the rest of the season, helping Lincoln to the play-off final, not just with his exceptional defensive performances, but with 5 goals, including both in a 2–1 aggregate victory over Macclesfield in the play-off semi-final.

The 2005–06 season, however, saw him cement a spot in the centre of the Imps defence. With Ben Futcher leaving on a free transfer to join rivals Boston United, McAuley took his place. He enjoyed a fantastic season, which culminated ultimately in play-off defeat for Lincoln again, but saw him named in the League Two Team of the Year, and also caught the attention of a number of bigger clubs.

The lure of playing at a higher level saw McAuley reject Lincoln City's offer of a new contract in the summer of 2006, and he moved on a free transfer to Leicester City.

=== Leicester City ===
McAuley signed for Leicester City on 5 June 2006, after reaching the end of his contract at Lincoln, signing a three-year deal. He scored his first senior goal for Leicester on 17 January in a 4–3 defeat to Fulham in the FA Cup, and was also on the scoresheet against Ipswich Town on 10 February, heading in both as Leicester won 2–0.

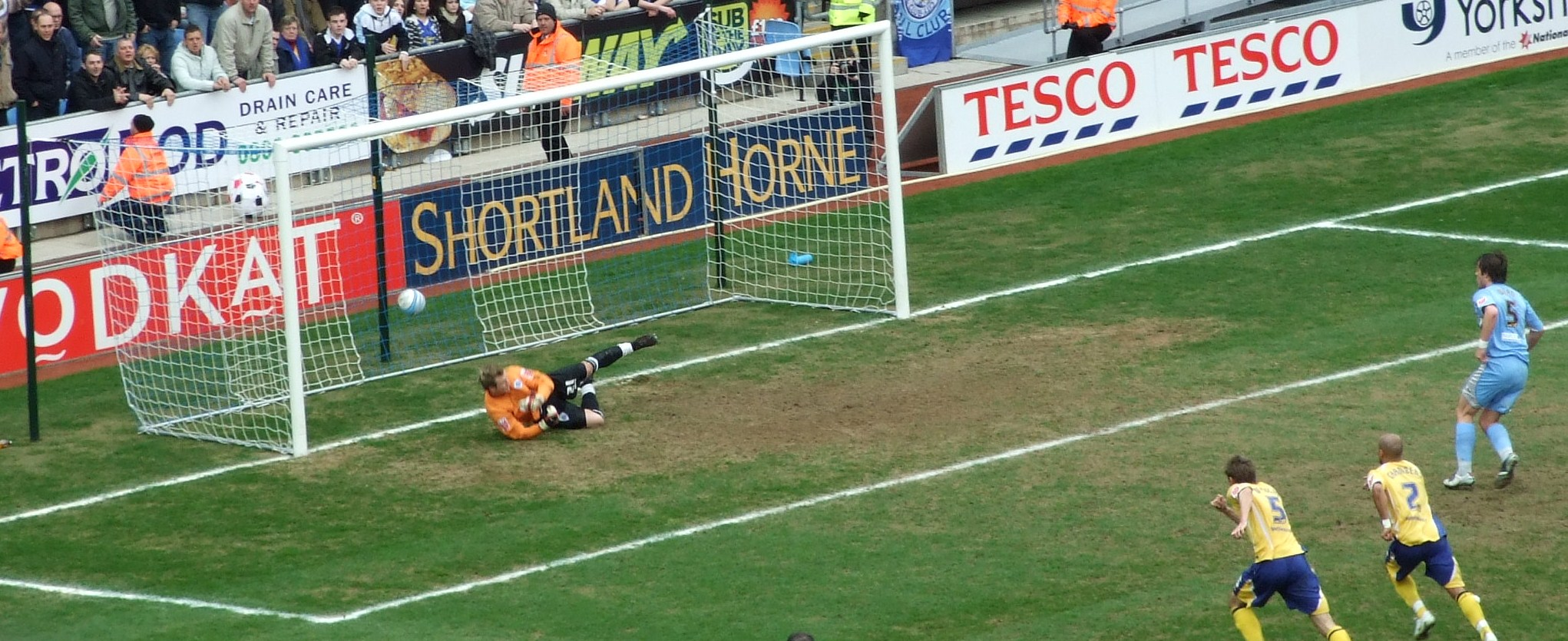
McAuley (No. 5) watches as Coventry score a penalty kick in an M69 derby at the Ricoh Arena

In the 2007–08 season, McAuley was appointed captain in a 0–0 draw against Wolverhampton Wanderers on 2 October 2007, following Stephen Clemence's injury. He scored his fourth goal on 5 October against Sheffield Wednesday, helping Leicester earn their second only league win of the season, and was then named in the Championship Team of the Week three days later. McAuley is one of three players (DJ Campbell & Carl Cort) who netted in three goals against Chelsea in a League Cup match on 31 October at Stamford Bridge, but could not prevent his side from losing 4–3.

In January 2008, Ipswich Town manager Jim Magilton made two bids to sign McAuley, but both of these were turned down. Despite signing a new three-and-a-half-year deal on 8 February, McAuley decided to leave Leicester following their relegation three months later.

=== Ipswich Town ===
McAuley signed for Ipswich Town on 18 June 2008 and was named captain for the 2008/09 season, following the departure of club captain Richard Naylor in February 2009. The defender got off to a somewhat shaky start, but after settling into the squad, established himself as a commanding leader and consistent defender. He made his debut on the opening day of the 2008–09 season, starting in a 1–2 loss to Preston North End. He made 39 appearances in all competitions during his first season at the club. McAuley further enhanced his international credentials whilst with the Suffolk team.

He continued to be a regular starter in the team during the 2009–10 season. He scored his first goal for the club on 29 September 2009, in a 3–3 away draw with Sheffield United at Bramall Lane. McAuley scored 5 goals in 43 games over the course of the season.

On 6 November 2010, McAuley played his 100th game for Ipswich Town, in which he scored the winner in a 2–1 win against Sheffield United. He made 127 appearances during his time at Portman Road, scoring 8 goals, while also captaining the club during the 2008–09 season.

=== West Bromwich Albion ===
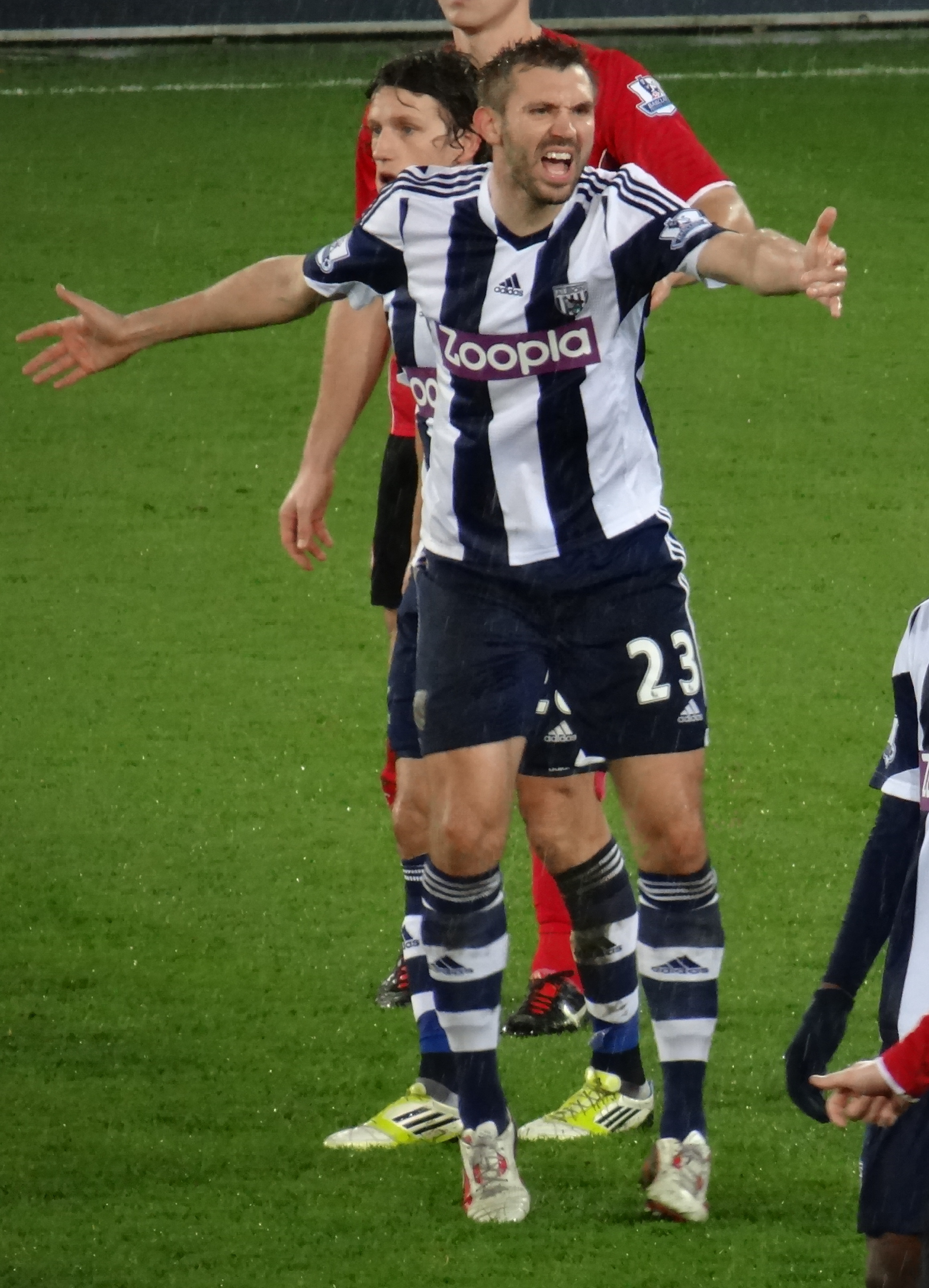
McAuley playing for West Bromwich Albion in 2013

On 23 May 2011, West Bromwich Albion officially announced McAuley would be signing a three-year contract (pending a medical) beginning 1 July; he scored his first goal for the team in a 3–2 win away at Newcastle in December 2011. McAuley scored his second West Bromwich Albion goal, helping them beat Chelsea after 33 years without a point against the Blues. He scored in the 82nd minute of the game which finished 1–0.

The 2012–2013 season saw McAuley consolidate his place in the starting XI alongside Jonas Olsson, with the pair forming a solid partnership at the heart of the Albion defence. McAuley went on to make 36 league appearances scoring 3 goals, including a powerful header in West Brom's famous 2-0 win against Liverpool F.C. at Anfield in February, helping Albion complete their first league double over Liverpool since 1967.

On 28 April 2013, McAuley was voted Players' Player of the Year and Supporters' Player of the Year after an impressive 2012–2013 season.

On 21 March 2015, McAuley was sent off in the second minute against Manchester City by referee Neil Swarbrick in a Premier League match, due to mistaken identity with Craig Dawson.

The 2016–2017 season was the most prolific goal scoring campaign of McAuley's career, scoring 6 goals in 36 Premier League appearances. These goals included a 94th minute equaliser away at West Ham United in February and the winning goal in a 2-1 victory at home to AFC Bournemouth in the following game.

On 20 June 2018, it was announced that McAuley would leave West Brom upon the expiration of his contract. After making over 200 top flight appearances for the club, McAuley is held in high regard by West Brom fans and is widely considered to be one of their best defenders of the modern era.

=== Rangers ===
McAuley signed for Rangers on 3 September 2018, on a deal until the end of the 2018–19 season. He made his debut as an injury-time substitute on 8 November in a 4–3 defeat away to Spartak Moscow in the Europa League.

=== Retirement ===
McAuley announced his retirement as a player on 30 September 2019, aged 39.

== International career ==
In May 2003, McAuley received his first senior international call when he was one of five Irish League players named in the squad for the Northern Ireland B team fixture with Scotland B on 20 May 2003. Selected in the starting eleven, the team fell to a 2–1 defeat in front of just 1,502 spectators at Firhill Stadium.

He received his first cap against Germany as his team lost 4–1 in a friendly match on 4 June 2005.

McAuley contemplated international retirement after being left out of the squad to face Sweden on 17 October 2007. But on 9 October, Nigel Worthington recalled him to the squad. McAuley made his comeback against Sweden on 17 October, drawing 1–1. He was also part of the squad that defeated Denmark 2–1 in a memorable victory on 17 November, keeping the national team's hopes of qualifying for the UEFA Euro 2008. Their hopes were dashed when they lost 1–0 to Spain in Las Palmas on 21 November, finishing third in Group F with twenty points. McAuley scored his first international goal against San Marino on 11 February 2009.

McAuley was called up to the Northern Ireland squad for the European qualification games against Serbia and Slovenia in March 2011. He scored his second international goal against Serbia, but could not prevent his side losing 2–1. For the second game, against Slovenia, McAuley was named captain for the first time. He led his side to a 0–0 draw, putting in a man of the match display himself at the same time.

On 4 September, McAuley scored twice for Northern Ireland in a 3–1 win against the Faroe Islands. The result put Northern Ireland at the top of Group F and on the brink of qualifying for their first European Championship.

McAuley scored the first Northern Ireland goal in a tournament for 30 years, since Colin Clarke at the 1986 FIFA World Cup, against Ukraine in Euro 2016. In addition to this making him the second-oldest scorer at the Euros, it also saw the team win for the first time at the European finals. Having made it out of the group stage, McAuley scored an own goal during the Euro 2016 round of 16 match against Wales, that resulted in Northern Ireland being eliminated from the tournament.

At 36 years and 341 days, Gareth McAuley became the oldest scorer in European 2018 FIFA World Cup Qualification games when he scored the second goal in Northern Ireland's 4–0 win over Azerbaijan on 11 November 2016.

== Managerial career ==
On 14 August 2023, McAuley was appointed manager of the Northern Ireland national under-19 football team.

== Personal life ==
McAuley was appointed a Member of the Order of the British Empire (MBE) in the 2019 New Year Honours for services to football in Northern Ireland.

== Career statistics ==
=== Club ===
Appearances and goals by club, season and competition
Club	Season	League			National cup		League cup		Other		Total	
Club	Season	Division	Apps	Goals	Apps	Goals	Apps	Goals	Apps	Goals	Apps	Goals
Lincoln City	2004–05	League Two	37	3	1	0	2	0	4 (Note: Three appearances and two goals in League Two play-offs, one in Football League Trophy)	2	44	5
Lincoln City	2005–06	League Two	35	5	1	0	1	0	3 (Note: Two appearances in League Two play-offs, one in Football League Trophy)	0	40	5
Lincoln City	Total		72	8	2	0	3	0	7	2	84	10
Leicester City	2006–07	Championship	30	3	2	1	3	0	—		35	4
Leicester City	2007–08	Championship	44	2	1	0	4	1	—		49	3
Leicester City	Total		74	5	3	1	7	1	—		84	7
Ipswich Town	2008–09	Championship	35	0	2	0	2	0	—		39	0
Ipswich Town	2009–10	Championship	41	5	2	0	0	0	—		43	5
Ipswich Town	2010–11	Championship	39	2	1	0	5	1	—		45	3
Ipswich Town	Total		115	7	5	0	7	1	—		127	8
West Bromwich Albion	2011–12	Premier League	32	2	2	0	2	0	—		36	2
West Bromwich Albion	2012–13	Premier League	36	3	2	0	0	0	—		38	3
West Bromwich Albion	2013–14	Premier League	32	2	1	0	0	0	—		33	2
West Bromwich Albion	2014–15	Premier League	24	1	4	0	3	1	—		31	2
West Bromwich Albion	2015–16	Premier League	34	1	4	0	1	0	—		39	1
West Bromwich Albion	2016–17	Premier League	36	6	1	0	1	1	—		38	7
West Bromwich Albion	2017–18	Premier League	9	0	2	0	1	0	—		12	0
West Bromwich Albion	Total		203	15	16	0	8	2	—		227	17
Rangers	2018–19	Scottish Premiership	7	0	1	0	0	0	2 (Note: Appearances in UEFA Europa League)	0	10	0
Career total			472	35	27	1	25	4	9	2	532	42

=== International ===
Appearances and goals by national team and year
National team	Year	Apps	Goals
Northern Ireland	2005	2	0
Northern Ireland	2006	3	0
Northern Ireland	2007	3	0
Northern Ireland	2008	5	0
Northern Ireland	2009	7	1
Northern Ireland	2010	5	0
Northern Ireland	2011	10	1
Northern Ireland	2012	5	0
Northern Ireland	2013	6	2
Northern Ireland	2014	5	1
Northern Ireland	2015	7	2
Northern Ireland	2016	12	2
Northern Ireland	2017	6	0
Northern Ireland	2018	4	0
Total		80	9

Scores and results list Northern Ireland's goal tally first, score column indicates score after each McAuley goal.

International goals by date, venue, cap, opponent, score, result and competition
No.	Date	Venue	Cap	Opponent	Score	Result	Competition
1	11 February 2009	San Marino Stadium, Serravalle, San Marino	14	San Marino	1–0	3–0	2010 FIFA World Cup qualification
2	25 March 2011	Red Star Stadium, Belgrade, Serbia	27	Serbia	1–0	1–2	UEFA Euro 2012 qualification
3	6 September 2013	Windsor Park, Belfast, Northern Ireland	44	Portugal	1–1	2–4	2014 FIFA World Cup qualification
4	10 September 2013	Stade Josy Barthel, Luxembourg City, Luxembourg	45	Luxembourg	2–2	2–3	2014 FIFA World Cup qualification
5	11 October 2014	Windsor Park, Belfast, Northern Ireland	49	Faroe Islands	1–0	2–0	UEFA Euro 2016 qualification
6	4 September 2015	Tórsvøllur, Tórshavn, Faroe Islands	54	Faroe Islands	1–0	3–1	UEFA Euro 2016 qualification
7	4 September 2015	Tórsvøllur, Tórshavn, Faroe Islands	54	Faroe Islands	2–1	3–1	UEFA Euro 2016 qualification
8	16 June 2016	Parc Olympique Lyonnais, Décines-Charpieu, France	63	Ukraine	1–0	2–0	UEFA Euro 2016
9	11 November 2016	Windsor Park, Belfast, Northern Ireland	69	Azerbaijan	2–0	4–0	2018 FIFA World Cup qualification

== Honours ==
Coleraine

- Irish Cup: 2002–03

Individual

- PFA Team of the Year: 2005–06 League Two
- Ipswich Town Player of the Year: 2009–10
- West Bromwich Albion Player of the Year: 2012–13
- West Bromwich Albion Players' Player of the Year: 2012–13

Orders

- Member of the Order of the British Empire: 2019
