= Leo Donnellan =

Irish former footballer

Personal information
- Full name: Leo John Donnellan
- Date of birth: 19 January 1965 (age 61)
- Place of birth: Willesden, England
- Height: 5 ft 10 in (1.78 m)
- Position: Midfielder

Youth career
- 1982–1984: Chelsea

Senior career*
| Years | Team | Apps | (Gls) |
| 1984–1985 | Chelsea | 0 | (0) |
| 1984 | → Leyton Orient (loan) | 6 | (0) |
| 1985–1990 | Fulham | 54 | (4) |
- Farnborough Town
- Wealdstone
| 1992 | Hendon | 9 | (0) |

International career
| 1983 | Republic of Ireland U18 | 1 | (0) |
| 1985 | Republic of Ireland U21 | 1 | (0) |
- * Club domestic league appearances and goals as of 10 February 2017

Leo John Donnellan (born 19 January 1965) is an Irish former footballer who played professionally for Fulham as a midfielder. He was also capped by the Republic of Ireland Under 18 and Republic of Ireland Under 21 sides in 1983 and 1985.

== Personal life ==
Donnellan is the father of Leo Donnellan Jr who played for Enfield Town and Shaun Donnellan, who plays for Livingston and the brother of fellow professional footballer Gary Donnellan.
