= 2008–09 West Bromwich Albion F.C. season =

West Bromwich Albion
2008–09 season
- Chairman: Jeremy Peace
- Manager: Tony Mowbray
- Stadium: The Hawthorns
- Premier League: 20th (relegated)
- FA Cup: Fourth round
- League Cup: Second round
- Top goalscorer: League: Chris Brunt (9); All: Chris Brunt (9)
- Highest home attendance: 26,344 (vs. Tottenham Hotspur, 28 December)
- Lowest home attendance: 24,741 (vs. Wigan Athletic, 9 May)
- Average home league attendance: 25,827
Home colours	Away colours

During the 2008–09 English football season, West Bromwich Albion competed in the Premier League, following promotion from the Football League Championship as Football League champions the previous season.

== Season summary ==
West Bromwich began the season strongly with ten points from their opening seven games leaving them in midtable, but that proved to be as good as it got for the Midlanders and with only five more league wins during the rest of the season Albion soon sunk to the foot of the Premier League and were relegated in last place. At the end of the season, manager Tony Mowbray left to take charge at Celtic; he was replaced by MK Dons manager Roberto Di Matteo.

In January, an assessment of company accounts by Equifax saw Albion rated third among Premiership clubs by credit rating, with a score of 71 out of 100.

== Final league table ==
Pos	Team	Pld	W	D	L	GF	GA	GD	Pts	Qualification or relegation
16	Sunderland	38	9	9	20	34	54	−20	36	
17	Hull City	38	8	11	19	39	64	−25	35	
18	Newcastle United (R)	38	7	13	18	40	59	−19	34	Relegation to Football League Championship
19	Middlesbrough (R)	38	7	11	20	28	57	−29	32	Relegation to Football League Championship
20	West Bromwich Albion (R)	38	8	8	22	36	67	−31	32	Relegation to Football League Championship

Source: Premier League
Rules for classification: 1) points; 2) goal difference; 3) number of goals scored.
(R) Relegated

== Background ==
West Bromwich retained their kit sponsorship deal with English company Umbro, who introduced both a new home kit and a new away kit with navy shorts and yellow shirts and socks. The club was unable to find a kit sponsor for the season, and so became the first club in Premier League history to go a season without any kit sponsorship.

Albion completed a £3 million-plus refurbishment of the Halfords Lane Stand in time for the start of the season. This included new dressing rooms, dugout areas and tunnel, executive boxes and a media gantry. As a result, the capacity of The Hawthorns was slightly reduced to 26,272 and the stand was renamed as the West Stand. New navy blue seats were installed in the stand, replacing the lighter blue seats previously fitted.

== Players ==
=== First-team squad ===
Note: Flags indicate national team as defined under FIFA eligibility rules; some limited exceptions apply. Players may hold more than one non-FIFA nationality.

No.	Pos.	Nation	Player
1	GK	IRL	Dean Kiely (Note: Kiely was born in Salford, England, and represented them at U-15, U-16, and U-18 level, but also qualified to represent the Republic of Ireland internationally and made his international debut for the Republic of Ireland in November 1999.)
2	DF	BEL	Carl Hoefkens
3	DF	ENG	Paul Robinson
4	DF	SVK	Marek Čech
5	DF	ENG	Leon Barnett
7	MF	SVN	Robert Koren
8	MF	ENG	Jonathan Greening (captain)
9	FW	CZE	Roman Bednar
10	FW	ENG	Ishmael Miller
11	FW	NIR	Chris Brunt
12	FW	SCO	Craig Beattie
14	MF	KOR	Kim Do-heon
16	FW	ENG	Luke Moore
17	MF	SCO	Graham Dorrans
18	DF	CPV	Pelé (Note: Pelé was born in Albufeira, Portugal, but also qualified to represent Cape Verde internationally and made his international debut for Cape Verde in 2006.)

No.	Pos.	Nation	Player
19	GK	ENG	Scott Carson
20	MF	POR	Filipe Teixeira (Note: Teixeira was born in Boulogne-Billancourt, France, but also qualified to represent Portugal internationally and represented them at U-18, U-20, and U-21 level.)
21	MF	ARG	Juan Carlos Menseguez (on loan from San Lorenzo)
22	DF	NED	Gianni Zuiverloon
23	DF	CIV	Abdoulaye Méïté (Note: Méïté was born in Colombes, France, but also qualified to represent the Ivory Coast internationally and made his international debut for the Ivory Coast in 2003.)
24	DF	ANT	Shelton Martis
26	DF	SWE	Jonas Olsson
27	MF	SCO	James Morrison (Note: Morrison was born in Darlington, England, and represented them at U-17, U-18, U-19, and U-21 level, but also qualified to represent Scotland internationally through his grandparents and made his international debut for Scotland in May 2008.)
28	MF	ESP	Borja Valero
29	FW	ENG	Jay Simpson (on loan from Arsenal)
30	DF	NED	Ryan Donk (on loan from AZ)
31	MF	COD	Youssouf Mulumbu (Note: Mulumbu was born in Kinshasa, Zaire (now Democratic Republic of the Congo), but also qualified to represent France internationally and represented them at U-20 and U-21 level before making his international debut for the Democratic Republic of the Congo in March 2008.)
32	FW	GUF	Marc-Antoine Fortuné
39	FW	NZL	Chris Wood

=== Left club during season ===
Note: Flags indicate national team as defined under FIFA eligibility rules; some limited exceptions apply. Players may hold more than one non-FIFA nationality.

No.	Pos.	Nation	Player
15	FW	NED	Sherjill MacDonald (on loan to Roeselare)
—	GK	CZE	Michal Daněk (on loan from Viktoria Plzeň)

No.	Pos.	Nation	Player
—	DF	ENG	Lee Baker (to Kidderminster Harriers)
—	FW	POL	Bartosz Ślusarski (on loan to Sheffield Wednesday; released)

=== Reserve squad ===
Note: Flags indicate national team as defined under FIFA eligibility rules; some limited exceptions apply. Players may hold more than one non-FIFA nationality.

No.	Pos.	Nation	Player
6	DF	ENG	Neil Clement
13	GK	ENG	Luke Daniels
25	DF	ENG	Jared Hodgkiss
34	DF	ENG	Paul Downing

No.	Pos.	Nation	Player
38	MF	ENG	Romaine Sawyers (Note: Sawyers was born in Birmingham, England, but also qualified to represent Saint Kitts and Nevis internationally and represented them at U-23 level before making his international debut for Saint Kitts and Nevis in October 2012.)
41	GK	ENG	Ryan Allsop
—	MF	ENG	Joss Labadie
—	MF	ENG	David Worrall

== Transfers ==
=== In ===
Date	Position	Name	Club From	Fee	Reference
29 May 2008	FW	Luke Moore	Aston Villa	£3,500,000	
29 May 2008	MF	Kim Do-heon	Seongnam Ilhwa Chunma	£550,000	
3 July 2008	DF	Gianni Zuiverloon	Heerenveen	£3,200,000	
4 July 2008	MF	Graham Dorrans	Livingston	£100,000	
15 July 2008	DF	Marek Čech	Porto	£1,400,000	
18 July 2008	GK	Scott Carson	Liverpool	£3,250,000	
10 August 2008	DF	Abdoulaye Méïté	Bolton Wanderers	£2,000,000	
19 August 2008	MF	Borja Valero	Mallorca	£4,900,000	
31 August 2008	DF	Jonas Olsson	NEC Nijmegen	£850,000	

=== Out ===
Date	Position	Name	Club To	Fee	Reference
21 May 2008	GK	Luke Steele	Barnsley	Free	
11 June 2008	MF	Zoltan Gera	Fulham	Free	
1 July 2008	DF	Martin Albrechtsen	Derby County	Free	
3 July 2008	DF	Curtis Davies	Aston Villa	Undisclosed	
9 July 2008	FW	Kevin Phillips	Birmingham City	Free	
12 January 2009	FW	Bartosz Ślusarski	Free Agency	Released	

=== Loan In ===
Date	Position	Name	Club From	Length	Reference
31 August 2008	DF	Ryan Donk	AZ Alkmaar	Until end of season	
31 December 2008	FW	Jay Simpson	Arsenal	Until end of season	
15 January 2009	FW	Marc-Antoine Fortuné	Nancy	Until end of season	
2 February 2009	MF	Youssouf Mulumbu	PSG	Until end of season	
2 February 2009	MF	Juan Carlos Menseguez	San Lorenzo	Until end of season	

=== Loan Out ===
Date	Position	Name	Club To	Length	Reference
29 August 2008	DF	Jared Hodgkiss	Aberdeen	Six Months	
26 September 2008	FW	Craig Beattie	Crystal Palace	One Month	
29 October 2008	FW	Craig Beattie	Crystal Palace	Two Months (recalled 10 December)	
27 November 2008	FW	Bartosz Ślusarski	Sheffield Wednesday	One Month	
9 January 2009	FW	Sherjill MacDonald	Roeselare	Until end of season	
20 February 2009	FW	Craig Beattie	Sheffield United	Until end of season	
26 March 2009	DF	Jared Hodgkiss	Northampton Town	Until end of season	

== Statistics ==
=== Appearances and goals ===
No.	Pos	Nat	Player	Total		Premier League		FA Cup		League Cup	
No.	Pos	Nat	Player	Apps	Goals	Apps	Goals	Apps	Goals	Apps	Goals
Goalkeepers
1	GK	(Republic of Ireland) IRL	Dean Kiely	4	0	3	0	0	0	1	0
19	GK	(England) ENG	Scott Carson	39	0	35	0	4	0	0	0
Defenders
2	DF	(Belgium) BEL	Carl Hoefkens	15	0	6+4	0	3+1	0	1	0
3	DF	(England) ENG	Paul Robinson	37	1	35	0	2	1	0	0
4	DF	(Slovakia) SVK	Marek Čech	11	0	3+5	0	2	0	1	0
5	DF	(England) ENG	Leon Barnett	14	0	10+1	0	2	0	1	0
18	DF	(Cape Verde) CPV	Pelé	6	0	1+2	0	2	0	0+1	0
22	DF	(Netherlands) NED	Gianni Zuiverloon	35	1	33	0	1+1	1	0	0
23	DF	(Ivory Coast) CIV	Abdoulaye Méïté	19	0	18	0	0	0	1	0
24	DF	(Netherlands Antilles) ANT	Shelton Martis	7	0	6+1	0	0	0	0	0
26	DF	(Sweden) SWE	Jonas Olsson	29	3	28	2	1	1	0	0
30	DF	(Netherlands) NED	Ryan Donk	19	0	14+2	0	3	0	0	0
Midfielders
7	MF	(Slovenia) SVN	Robert Koren	39	3	34+1	1	3	1	1	1
8	MF	(England) ENG	Jonathan Greening	38	2	33+1	2	3	0	1	0
11	MF	(Northern Ireland) NIR	Chris Brunt	38	9	28+6	9	1+2	0	1	0
14	MF	(South Korea) KOR	Kim Do-Heon	19	1	9+7	0	3	1	0	0
17	MF	(England) ENG	Graham Dorrans	11	0	5+3	0	1+2	0	0	0
20	MF	(Portugal) POR	Filipe Teixeira	13	0	1+9	0	3	0	0	0
21	MF	(Argentina) ARG	Juan Carlos Menseguez	7	1	3+4	1	0	0	0	0
27	MF	(Scotland) SCO	James Morrison	30	3	29+1	3	0	0	0	0
28	MF	(Spain) ESP	Borja Valero	34	0	27+3	0	1+2	0	1	0
31	DF	(Democratic Republic of the Congo) COD	Youssouf Mulumbu	6	0	2+4	0	0	0	0	0
Forwards
9	FW	(Czech Republic) CZE	Roman Bednar	31	6	12+14	6	4	0	1	0
10	FW	(England) ENG	Ishmael Miller	15	3	11+4	3	0	0	0	0
12	FW	(Scotland) SCO	Craig Beattie	10	1	1+6	1	0+2	0	0+1	0
16	FW	(England) ENG	Luke Moore	23	1	5+16	1	1	0	1	0
29	FW	(England) ENG	Jay Simpson	17	2	9+4	1	3+1	1	0	0
32	FW	(French Guiana) GUF	Marc-Antoine Fortuné	18	5	17	5	1	0	0	0
39	FW	(New Zealand) NZL	Chris Wood	2	0	0+2	0	0	0	0	0
Players transferred out during the season
18	FW	(Netherlands) NED	Sherjill MacDonald	6	0	0+5	0	0	0	0+1	0

== Results ==
West Bromwich Albion's score comes first

Win	Draw	Loss

=== League Cup ===
Date	Round	Opponent	Venue	Result	Attendance	Scorers
26 August 2008	Second round	Hartlepool United	Victoria Park	1–3 (aet)	3,387 (704)	Koren 87

=== FA Cup ===
Date	Round	Opponent	Venue	Result	Attendance	Scorers
3 January 2009	Third round	Peterborough United	The Hawthorns	1–1	18,659	Olsson 64'
13 January 2009	Third round replay	Peterborough United	London Road	2–0	10,735 (1,823)	Simpson 18', Robinson 37'
24 January 2009	Fourth round	Burnley	The Hawthorns	2–2	18,294 (1,270)	Koren 31', Kim 45'
3 February 2009	Fourth round replay	Burnley	Turf Moor	1–3 (aet)	6,635 (582)	Zuiverloon 60'

=== Premier League ===
Date	Opponent	Venue	Result	Attendance	Scorers
16 August 2008	Arsenal	Emirates Stadium	0–1	60,071 (2,996)	
23 August 2008	Everton	The Hawthorns	1–2	26,190 (2,598)	Bednar 89' pen.
30 August 2008	Bolton Wanderers	Reebok Stadium	0–0	20,387	
13 September 2008	West Ham United	The Hawthorns	3–2	26,213 (2,592)	Morrison 3', Bednar 37' pen., Brunt 83'
21 September 2008	Aston Villa	The Hawthorns	1–2	26,011 (2,595)	Morrison 33'
27 September 2008	Middlesbrough	Riverside Stadium	1–0	26,248 (2,480)	Olsson 53'
4 October 2008	Fulham	The Hawthorns	1–0	25,708	Bednar
18 October 2008	Manchester United	Old Trafford	0–4	75,451	
25 October 2008	Hull City	The Hawthorns	0–3	26,323 (2,596)	
28 October 2008	Newcastle United	St James' Park	1–2	45,801	Miller 65'
1 November 2008	Blackburn Rovers	The Hawthorns	2–2	24,976 (1,238)	Bednar 55', Miller 62'
8 November 2008	Liverpool	Anfield	0–3	43,451 (1,700)	
15 November 2008	Chelsea	The Hawthorns	0–3	26,322 (2,600)	
22 November 2008	Stoke City	Britannia Stadium	0–1	26,613	
29 November 2008	Wigan Athletic	JJB Stadium	1–2	17,054 (4,053)	Miller 47'
7 December 2008	Portsmouth	The Hawthorns	1–1	24,964	Greening 39'
13 December 2008	Sunderland	Stadium of Light	0–4	36,280 (1,307)	
21 December 2008	Manchester City	The Hawthorns	2–1	25,010 (1,419)	Moore 69', Bednar 93'
26 December 2008	Chelsea	Stamford Bridge	0–2	43,417	
28 December 2008	Tottenham Hotspur	The Hawthorns	2–0	26,344	Bednar 83', Beattie 94'
10 January 2009	Aston Villa	Villa Park	1–2	41,757 (2,800)	Morrison 49'
17 January 2009	Middlesbrough	The Hawthorns	3–0	25,557 (1,287)	Brunt 4', Fortune 54', Koren 67'
27 January 2009	Manchester United	The Hawthorns	0–5	26,105 (2,600)	
31 January 2009	Hull City	KC Stadium	2–2	24,879 (2,500)	Simpson 53', Brunt 73' pen.
7 February 2009	Newcastle United	The Hawthorns	2–3	25,817 (1,700)	Fortune 4', and 73'
22 February 2009	Fulham	Craven Cottage	0–2	22,394	
28 February 2009	Everton	Goodison Park	0–2	33,898	
3 March 2009	Arsenal	The Hawthorns	1–3	26,244 (2,598)	Brunt 7'
16 March 2009	West Ham United	Boleyn Ground	0–0	30,842	
21 March 2009	Bolton Wanderers	The Hawthorns	1–1	25,530 (1,462)	Shittu 82' o.g.
4 April 2009	Stoke City	The Hawthorns	0–2	26,277 (2,592)	
11 April 2009	Portsmouth	Fratton Park	2–2	20,376 (1,100)	Greening 48', Brunt 62'
19 April 2009	Manchester City	City of Manchester Stadium	2–4	40,072 (1,698)	Brunt 37', 54'
25 April 2009	Sunderland	The Hawthorns	3–0	26,256 (2,597)	Olsson 40', Brunt 58', Menseguez 88'
2 May 2009	Tottenham Hotspur	White Hart Lane	0–1	35,836	
9 May 2009	Wigan Athletic	The Hawthorns	3–1	24,741 (598)	Fortune 8', 73', Brunt 59'
17 May 2009	Liverpool	The Hawthorns	0–2	26,138 (2,600)	
24 May 2009	Blackburn Rovers	Ewood Park	0–0	28,389	
