= 2007–08 West Bromwich Albion F.C. season =

West Bromwich Albion
2007–08 season
- Chairman: Jeremy Peace
- Manager: Tony Mowbray
- Stadium: The Hawthorns
- Championship: 1st (promoted to the Premier League)
- FA Cup: Semi-finals
- League Cup: Third round
- Top goalscorer: League: Kevin Phillips (22); All: Kevin Phillips (24)
- Average home league attendance: 22,311
Home colours	Away colours	Third colours

During the 2007–08 English football season, West Bromwich Albion competed in the Football League Championship. They finished the season in first place, thus earning promotion to the Premier League the following season.

== Season summary ==
After the previous season's play-off final heartbreak, Tony Mowbray set about restructuring his squad, moving out several players for multimillion-pound fees after press reports of dressing room division. High-profile players such as Jason Koumas, Diomansy Kamara and Curtis Davies were sold to Premier League clubs for large fees, joining Paul McShane, Nathan Ellington, Darren Carter and Steve Watson in leaving the Hawthorns. Mowbray replaced them by signing a total of 14 permanent and loan players in the summer transfer window, making an overall profit in the process.

Despite the large changes in his squad, Mowbray won the Championship Manager of the Month award in September, after Albion gained 13 out of the maximum 15 points and climbed to second. At the start of 2008, Mowbray's young Albion team topped the table, receiving growing plaudits from the media and supporters alike for their attractive brand of attacking one touch passing football, a reflection of Mowbray's staunch footballing philosophy.

Mowbray guided Albion to the Football League Championship title and promotion to the Premier League, the first league title won by the club since the old Division One in 1920. The club also reached the FA Cup semi-final. The semi-final, the first to be played at the new Wembley Stadium, pitted Albion against Portsmouth, the only remaining Premier League team left in the FA Cup. Portsmouth won the match 1–0 with the only goal of the game coming from former Albion striker Nwankwo Kanu. Mowbray won the Championship manager of the month award for April, as well as the League Managers Association manager of the year award.

== Kit ==
English company Umbro remained West Bromwich's kit manufacturers. T-Mobile remained the kit sponsors.

== Final league table ==
Pos	Team	Pld	W	D	L	GF	GA	GD	Pts	Promotion, qualification or relegation
1	West Bromwich Albion (C, P)	46	23	12	11	88	55	+33	81	Promotion to the Premier League
2	Stoke City (P)	46	21	16	9	69	55	+14	79	Promotion to the Premier League
3	Hull City (O, P)	46	21	12	13	65	47	+18	75	Qualification for Championship play-offs
4	Bristol City	46	20	14	12	54	53	+1	74	Qualification for Championship play-offs
5	Crystal Palace	46	18	17	11	58	42	+16	71	Qualification for Championship play-offs

Updated to match(es) played on 4 May 2008. Source: The Football League
Rules for classification: 1) points; 2) goal difference; 3) number of goals scored.
(C) Champions; (O) Play-off winners; (P) Promoted

== Results ==
West Bromwich Albion's score comes first

=== Legend ===
Win	Draw	Loss

=== Football League Championship ===
Date	Opponent	Venue	Result	Attendance	Scorers
11 August 2007	Burnley	A	1–2	15,337 (2,191)	Phillips
18 August 2007	Preston North End	H	2–0	19,556	Phillips, Miller
25 August 2007	Sheffield United	A	0–1	23,491	
1 September 2007	Barnsley	H	2–0	18,310 (932)	Teixeira, Beattie
15 September 2007	Ipswich Town	H	4–0	19,460 (1,013)	Miller, Teixeira, Phillips (2)
18 September 2007	Bristol City	A	1–1	16,571 (2,019)	Koren
22 September 2007	Scunthorpe United	A	3–2	8,307 (1,800)	Barnett, Brunt, Teixeira
30 September 2007	Queens Park Rangers	H	5–1	24,757 (785)	Phillips (2), Miller, Koren, Greening
3 October 2007	Stoke City	H	1–1	20,048 (1,384)	Barnett
6 October 2007	Southampton	A	2–3	21,967 (2,218)	Koren (2)
20 October 2007	Colchester United	A	2–3	5,798 (1,000)	Phillips, Miller
23 October 2007	Blackpool	H	2–1	22,030 (1,382)	Miller, Morrison
27 October 2007	Norwich City	H	2–0	20,247	Miller, Phillips
3 November 2007	Watford	A	3–0	18,273 (2,200)	Miller, Phillips, Albrechtsen
6 November 2007	Sheffield Wednesday	H	1–1	19,807 (1,726)	Phillips
12 November 2007	Coventry City	A	4–0	18,566 (2,818)	Robinson, Teixeira (2), Koren
25 November 2007	Wolverhampton Wanderers	H	0–0	27,493 (2,600)	
28 November 2007	Plymouth Argyle	A	2–1	14,348	Bednář (2)
1 December 2007	Crystal Palace	A	1–1	15,247	Hudson (own goal)
4 December 2007	Coventry City	H	2–4	20,641	Bednář (2)
8 December 2007	Leicester City	A	2–1	22,088	Gera, Beattie
15 December 2007	Charlton Athletic	H	4–2	20,346 (787)	Bednář, Gera (2), Phillips
22 December 2007	Stoke City	A	1–3	18,420 (2,439)	Bednář
26 December 2007	Bristol City	H	4–1	27,314 (2,600)	Bednář, Koren, Phillips (2)
29 December 2007	Scunthorpe United	H	5–0	25,238 (584)	Phillips (2), Koren, Gera, Beattie
1 January 2008	Ipswich Town	A	0–2	24,000	
12 January 2008	Hull City	A	3–1	18,391 (1,524)	Phillips, Morrison, Bednář
19 January 2008	Cardiff City	H	3–3	22,325 (2,453)	Bednář, Albrechtsen, Johnson (own goal)
29 January 2008	Preston North End	A	1–2	12,473 (1,842)	Gera
2 February 2008	Burnley	H	2–1	22,206 (2,081)	Cesar, Bednář
9 February 2008	Barnsley	A	1–2	13,083 (2,065)	Morrison
12 February 2008	Sheffield United	H	0–0	22,643	
23 February 2008	Hull City	H	1–2	22,716 (1,424)	Bednář
1 March 2008	Plymouth Argyle	H	3–0	22,503 (1,346)	Gera, Miller, Bednář
4 March 2008	Sheffield Wednesday	A	1–0	18,805	Phillips
12 March 2008	Crystal Palace	H	1–1	20,378	Phillips
15 March 2008	Leicester City	H	1–4	22,038 (1,736)	Koren
21 March 2008	Charlton Athletic	A	1–1	23,412	Phillips
29 March 2008	Colchester United	H	4–3	20,433 (686)	Phillips, Brunt, Bednář, Morrison
1 April 2008	Cardiff City	A	0–0	13,915	
8 April 2008	Blackpool	A	3–1	9,628 (1,900)	Phillips (2, 1 pen), Miller
12 April 2008	Watford	H	1–1	26,508	Barnett
15 April 2008	Wolverhampton Wanderers	A	1–0	27,883 (2,600)	Gera
19 April 2008	Norwich City	A	2–1	25,442 (2,500)	Koren, Gera
28 April 2008	Southampton	H	1–1	26,167 (1,263)	Brunt
4 May 2008	Queens Park Rangers	A	2–0	18,309 (2,600)	Do-Heon, Brunt

=== FA Cup ===
Round	Date	Opponent	Venue	Result	Attendance	Goalscorers
R3	5 January 2008	Charlton Athletic	A	1–1	12,682	Miller
R3R	15 January 2008	Charlton Athletic	H	2–2 (won 4–3 on pens)	12,691	Bednář, Morrison
R4	26 January 2008	Peterborough United	A	3–0	12,701	Bednář, Koren, Phillips (pen)
R5	16 February 2008	Coventry City	A	5–0	28,163 (5,000)	Brunt, Bednář (2, 1 pen), Miller, Gera
QF	9 March 2008	Bristol Rovers	A	5–1	12,011 (1,500)	Morrison, Miller (3), Phillips
SF	5 April 2008	Portsmouth	N	0–1	83,584	

=== League Cup ===
Round	Date	Opponent	Venue	Result	Attendance	Goalscorers
R1	14 August 2007	Bournemouth	H	1–0	10,250 (432)	Beattie
R2	28 August 2007	Peterborough United	A	2–0	4,917	Gera, Ellington
R3	25 September 2007	Cardiff City	H	2–4	14,085	Miller (2, 1 pen)

== Players ==
=== First-team squad ===
Squad at end of season

Note: Flags indicate national team as defined under FIFA eligibility rules; some limited exceptions apply. Players may hold more than one non-FIFA nationality.

No.	Pos.	Nation	Player
1	GK	IRL	Dean Kiely (Note: Kiely was born in Salford, England, and represented them at U-15, U-16, and U-18 level, but also qualified to represent the Republic of Ireland internationally and made his international debut for the Republic of Ireland in November 1999.)
2	DF	BEL	Carl Hoefkens
3	DF	ENG	Paul Robinson
4	DF	ENG	Leon Barnett
5	DF	ENG	Neil Clement
7	MF	SVN	Robert Koren
8	MF	ENG	Jonathan Greening
9	FW	CZE	Roman Bednář (on loan from Hearts)
10	FW	SCO	Craig Beattie
11	MF	HUN	Zoltán Gera
12	MF	KOR	Kim Do-heon (on loan from Seongnam Ilhwa Chunma)
13	GK	ENG	Luke Steele
14	DF	DEN	Martin Albrechtsen
15	FW	NED	Sherjill MacDonald
16	DF	ENG	Jared Hodgkiss

No.	Pos.	Nation	Player
17	FW	ENG	Ishmael Miller
18	DF	ANT	Shelton Martis
19	GK	CZE	Michal Daněk (on loan from Viktoria Plzeň)
20	MF	POR	Filipe Teixeira (Note: Teixeira was born in Boulogne-Billancourt, France, but also qualified to represent Portugal internationally and represented them at U-18, U-20, and U-21 level.)
21	FW	ENG	Kevin Phillips
22	FW	ENG	Stuart Nicholson
23	DF	MOZ	Tininho
24	FW	ENG	Luke Moore (on loan from Aston Villa)
25	DF	SVN	Boštjan Cesar (on loan from Marseille)
26	DF	CPV	Pelé (Note: Pelé was born in Albufeira, Portugal, but also qualified to represent Cape Verde internationally and made his international debut for Cape Verde in 2006.)
27	MF	SCO	James Morrison (Note: Morrison was born in Darlington, England, and represented them at U-17, U-18, U-19, and U-21 level, but also qualified to represent Scotland internationally through his grandparents and made his international debut for Scotland in May 2008.)
29	MF	NIR	Chris Brunt
30	FW	POL	Bartosz Ślusarski
32	MF	ENG	David Worrall

=== Left club during season ===
Note: Flags indicate national team as defined under FIFA eligibility rules; some limited exceptions apply. Players may hold more than one non-FIFA nationality.

No.	Pos.	Nation	Player
6	DF	ENG	Curtis Davies (on loan to Aston Villa)
9	FW	ENG	Nathan Ellington (to Watford)
12	MF	ENG	Richard Chaplow (to Preston North End)

No.	Pos.	Nation	Player
19	FW	WAL	John Hartson (retired)
24	DF	ENG	Ronnie Wallwork (to Sheffield Wednesday)
31	GK	ENG	Luke Daniels (on loan to Motherwell)

== Transfers ==
=== Out ===
- Chris Perry – released (later joined Luton Town), 1 June 2007
- Diomansy Kamara – Fulham, £6,000,000, 9 July 2007
- Steve Watson – Sheffield Wednesday, free, 10 July 2007
- Jason Koumas – Wigan Athletic, £5,300,000, 10 July 2007
- Paul McShane – Sunderland, £1,500,000, 26 July 2007
- Darren Carter – Preston North End, £750,000, 9 August 2007
- Nathan Ellington – Watford, £3,250,000, 29 August 2007
- Curtis Davies – Aston Villa, season loan, 31 August 2007

=== In ===
- Shelton Martis – Hibernian, £50,000, 2 July 2007.
- Craig Beattie – Celtic, £1,250,000, 3 July 2007
- Tomasz Kuszczak - Manchester United £2,100,000, 9 July 2007
- Filipe Teixeira – Académica, £600,000, 17 July 2007
- Leon Barnett – Luton Town, £2,500,000, 26 July 2007
- Tininho – Beira-Mar, £230,000, 31 July 2007
- Boštjan Cesar – Marseille, season loan, 7 August 2007
- Carl Hoefkens – Stoke City, £750,000, 7 August 2007
- James Morrison – Middlesbrough, £1,500,000, 7 August 2007
- Pelé – Southampton, £1,000,000, 9 August 2007
- Chris Brunt – Sheffield Wednesday, £3,000,000, 15 August 2007
- Ishmael Miller – Manchester City, loan, 15 August 2007(made permanent 31 January 2008 for £900,000)
- Bartosz Ślusarski – Dyskobolia Grodzisk
- Michal Daněk – Viktoria Plzeň, loan
- Roman Bednář – Hearts, loan
