= Daněk =

Daněk (feminine: Daňková) is a Czech surname. It literally translates as 'fallow deer' and it could have originated with this meaning, but it could also have originated as a pet form of the given name Daniel. The oldest mention of the surname is from 1674. A Germanised form of the surname is Danek. Notable people with the surname include:

- Jan Daněk (born 1982), Czech footballer
- Kryštof Daněk (born 2003), Czech footballer
- Ludvík Daněk (1937–1998), Czech athlete
- Lukáš Daněk (born 1997), Czech skier
- Michal Daněk (born 1983), Czech footballer
- Oldřich Daněk (1927–2000), Czech writer
- Václav Daněk (born 1960), Czech footballer
