= Dankowski =

Dankowski (feminine: Dankowska) is a Polish-language surname derived from one of the locations named Danków or Dankowo. The placenames themselves literally mean "belonging to Danek".

- Adela Dankowska, Polish aviator and politician
- Bronisław Dankowski, Polish politician
- Ed Danowski, American football player
- Józef Dankowski, Polish football coach and a former player
- Joseph Dankowski, American fine art photographer
- Kamil Dankowski, Polish professional footballer
- Piotr Edward Dankowski, Polish Catholic saint
