= James Morrison (footballer) =

Footballer (born 1986)

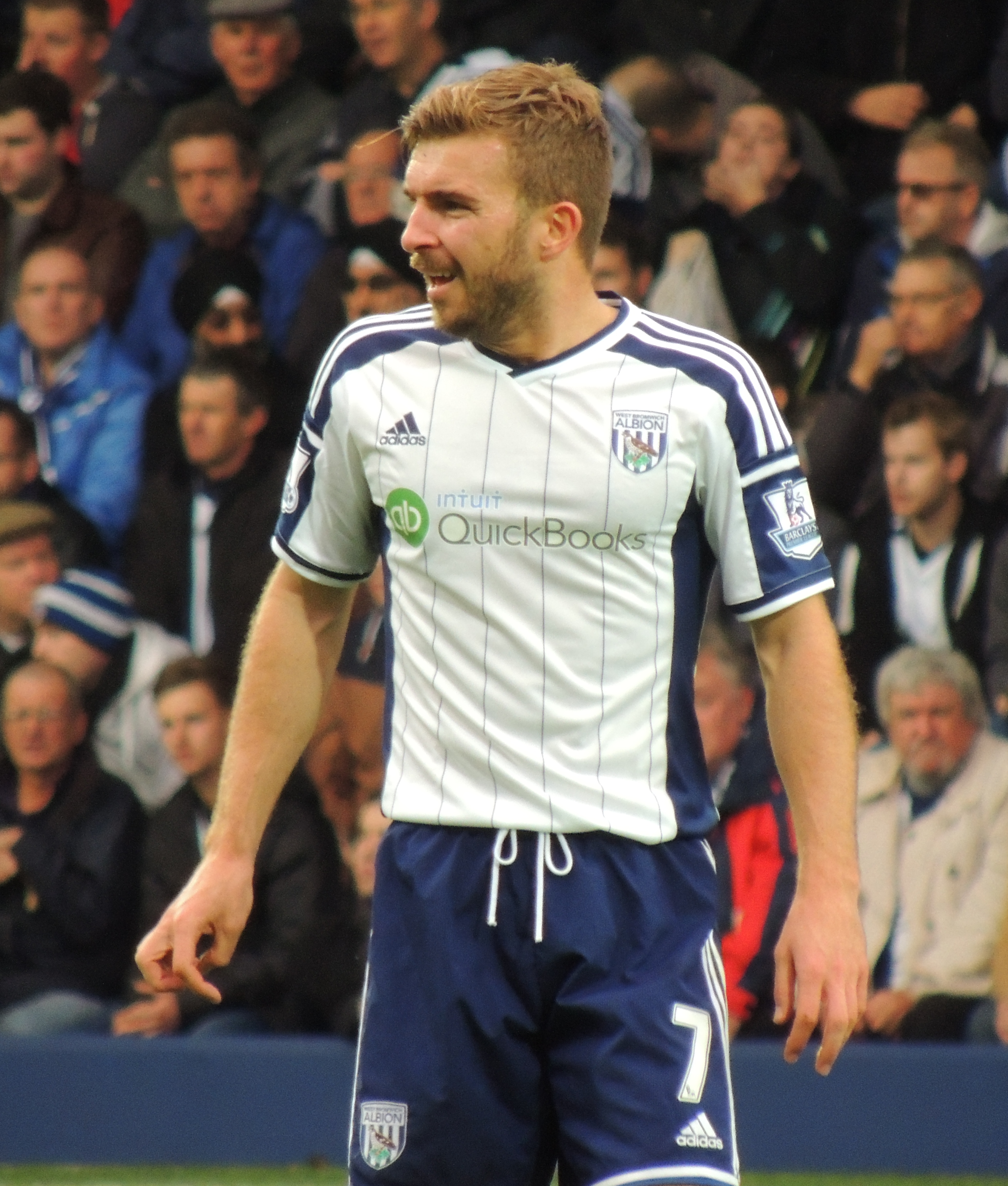
- Morrison in 2014

Personal information
- Full name: James Clark Morrison
- Date of birth: 25 May 1986 (age 40)
- Place of birth: Darlington, England
- Height: 5 ft 11 in (1.80 m)
- Position: Midfielder

Team information
- Current team: West Bromwich Albion (head coach)

Youth career
- Darlington 21st Allstars
- 1998–2004: Middlesbrough

Senior career*
Years	Team	Apps	(Gls)
2004–2007	Middlesbrough	66	(3)
2007–2019	West Bromwich Albion	309	(34)
Total		375	(37)

International career
2002–2003	England U17	6	(0)
2004	England U18	2	(0)
2004–2005	England U19	8	(0)
2005	England U20	1	(0)
2008–2017	Scotland	46	(3)

Managerial career
- 2025: West Bromwich Albion (caretaker)
- 2026: West Bromwich Albion (caretaker)
- 2026–: West Bromwich Albion
- * Club domestic league appearances and goals

James Clark Morrison (born 25 May 1986) is a professional football coach and former player, who is currently the head coach of EFL Championship club West Bromwich Albion. Morrison played as a midfielder for Middlesbrough and West Bromwich Albion between 2004 and 2019, and is regarded as one of the greatest midfielders in West Bromwich Albion's history.

Born in England, after representing various England youth sides, Morrison chose to play for Scotland at full international level and he made 46 full international appearances for them between 2008 and 2017.

== Club career ==
=== Middlesbrough ===
Morrison was born in Darlington, County Durham, and attended Hummersknott School. He is a product of Middlesbrough's youth academy. He starred in Middlesbrough's FA Youth Cup winning side in 2003–04, putting in several eye-catching performances throughout the cup run, notably scoring in the final first leg 3–0 win against Aston Villa.

His initial outings in the first team displayed some promise as well. He made his first-team debut on 3 January 2004, coming on as a second-half substitute in a 2–0 FA Cup victory against Notts County. His Premiership debut came four months later, when he replaced Stewart Downing in a 5–1 defeat away at Portsmouth on the final day of the 2003–04 season. Morrison's first European action for Middlesbrough was on 30 September 2004 in a UEFA Cup tie away at Banik Ostrava. He marked the occasion by scoring his first goal for the club, a last-minute equaliser that secured a 1–1 draw in the second leg and a 4–1 aggregate victory. Morrison started for Middlesbrough in the 2006 UEFA Cup Final against Sevilla. On 19 March 2007, he was sent off in an FA Cup quarter-final replay against Manchester United for a kick out at Cristiano Ronaldo.

=== West Bromwich Albion ===
On 7 August 2007, Morrison signed a four-year contract with West Bromwich Albion, for a £1.5 million fee plus add-ons. Morrison made his Albion debut as a second-half substitute in a 2–1 defeat away at Burnley on the opening day of the 2007–08 season. His first goal for the club was a second half winner in a 2–1 home victory over Blackpool on 23 October 2007, a strike that won him the West Bromwich Albion Supporters Club's Goal of the Season award. Morrison described it at the time as "the best goal I've scored in my career".

Morrison impressed in the first team throughout the 2008–09 season. He scored three goals in total over the course of the season, including his goals home and away against Aston Villa. On New Years Day 2011, he scored a 20-yard volley in a 2–1 defeat against Manchester United.

After numerous impressive displays, on 14 September 2012, Morrison signed a new four-year deal until 2016. For his performances in the 2014–15 season, Morrison won the official supporters player of the year award for the first time.

On 23 August 2015, Morrison scored both of West Bromwich Albion's goals in a 3–2 home defeat to Chelsea, the first two-goal haul of his career and an equalling of his goal tally for the previous season. Earlier in the game, he had a penalty saved by Thibaut Courtois. On 30 June 2016, Morrison signed a new two-year deal with West Brom keeping him at the club until at least the summer of 2018 with a one-year option. He further extended this on 3 August 2018, keeping him at the Hawthorns until 2019. He left the club after the 2018–19 season, with his final appearance coming in a play-off match against Aston Villa.

Morrison said in September 2019 that he was considering retirement, having only received offers from lower league clubs during the summer. On 29 October 2019, Morrison announced his retirement from professional football.

== International career ==
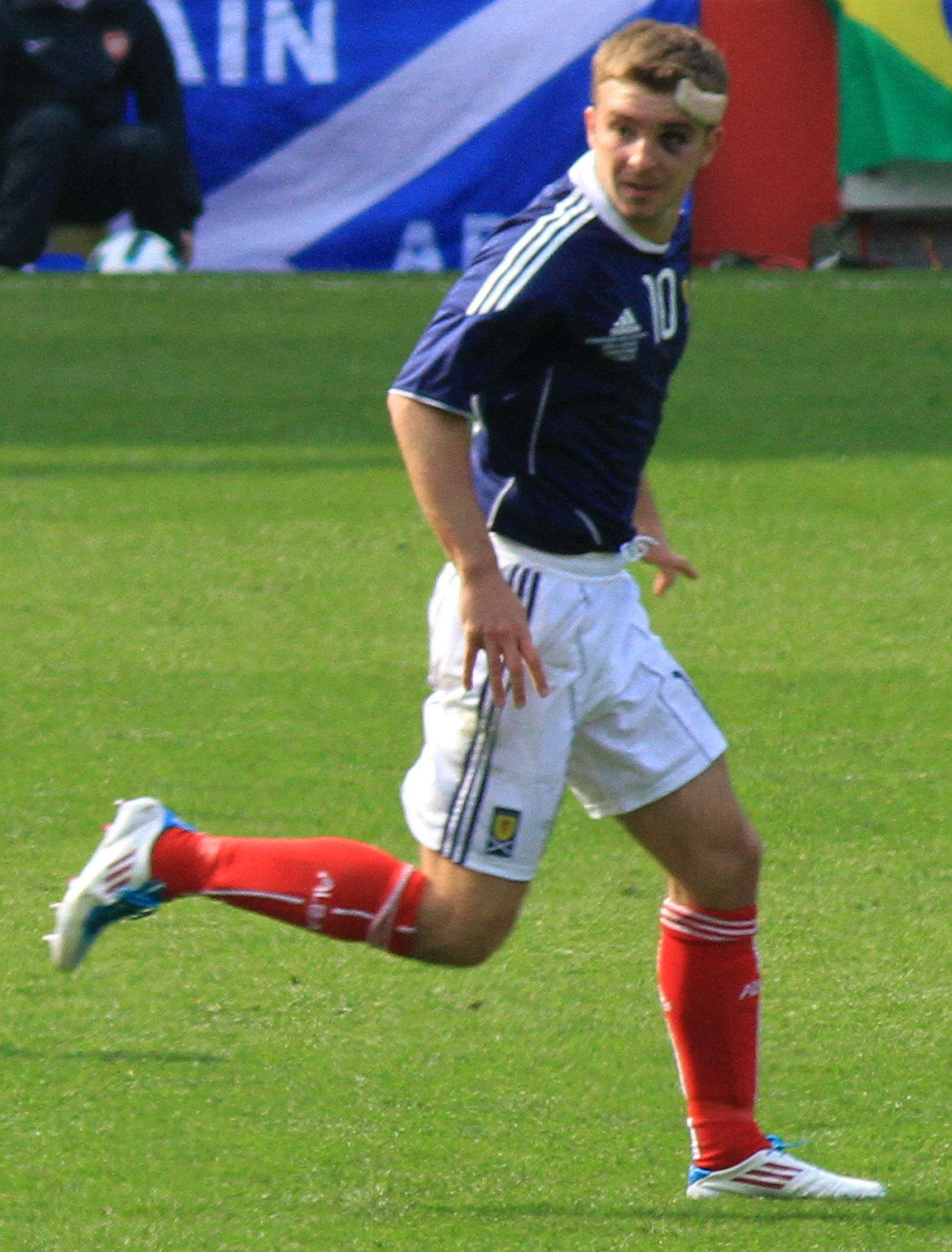
Morrison playing for Scotland in 2011

Morrison played at a number of youth levels for England. Along with Leicester City's Steve Howard and Aston Villa's Gabriel Agbonlahor, Morrison was one of a number of English Premier League players identified in June 2007 as being eligible to play for Scotland. He qualifies to play for the team through his grandparents (Morrison's grandfather, George, was from Largs). Morrison later chose to represent Scotland, claiming that he felt his "opportunities with England will be limited".

After receiving international clearance from FIFA, Morrison joined up with the Scotland squad for training in August 2007. He was unable to make his debut in the friendly against South Africa however, due to injury. Morrison was named in the Scotland B squad to face the Republic of Ireland B team in November, but injury forced him to withdraw from the squad again. He finally made his debut in the friendly against the Czech Republic in Prague, on 30 May 2008.

He scored his first goal for Scotland in the 3–1 win against Wales on 25 May 2011 in the Celtic Nations Cup tournament in Dublin. He also scored for Scotland against England in the friendly game at Wembley Stadium on 14 August 2013.

== Coaching career ==
After retiring as a player in October 2019, Morrison started working as a coach in the West Bromwich Albion academy. He was promoted to a first-team coaching role in December 2020, following the appointment of Sam Allardyce as West Brom manager.

Morrison joined the Scotland coaching staff during the June 2023 international break, replacing Steven Naismith. Scotland won both of their matches during that period, and Morrison then joined their coaching staff on a permanent basis.

On 21 April 2025, Morrison was appointed caretaker manager of West Bromwich Albion following the sacking of Tony Mowbray. He was again appointed caretaker manager of West Bromwich Albion following the departure of Ryan Mason on 6 January 2026. He was then appointed interim manager in February 2026 following the sacking of Eric Ramsay. On 30 April 2026, he was appointed permanently to the role of Head Coach at West Bromwich Albion, following his success in keeping the club safe from relegation. Morrison's Baggies lost only one game, his first in charge, in his first 11 with the club leading to his appointment, and at time of his appointment he had WBA on a ten match unbeaten run (four wins, six draws).

== Career statistics ==
=== Club ===
Appearances and goals by club, season and competition
Club	Season	League			FA Cup		League Cup		Other		Total	
Club	Season	Division	Apps	Goals	Apps	Goals	Apps	Goals	Apps	Goals	Apps	Goals
Middlesbrough	2003–04	Premier League	1	0	1	0	0	0	—		2	0
Middlesbrough	2004–05	Premier League	13	0	2	0	2	1	5 (Note: Appearances in UEFA Cup)	3	22	4
Middlesbrough	2005–06	Premier League	24	1	3	1	1	0	9	0	37	2
Middlesbrough	2006–07	Premier League	28	2	7	0	1	0	—		36	2
Middlesbrough	Total		66	3	13	1	4	1	14	3	97	8
West Bromwich Albion	2007–08	Championship	35	4	6	2	2	0	—		43	6
West Bromwich Albion	2008–09	Premier League	30	3	0	0	0	0	—		30	3
West Bromwich Albion	2009–10	Championship	11	1	1	0	0	0	—		12	1
West Bromwich Albion	2010–11	Premier League	31	4	1	0	0	0	—		32	4
West Bromwich Albion	2011–12	Premier League	30	5	2	0	1	0	—		33	5
West Bromwich Albion	2012–13	Premier League	35	5	2	0	0	0	—		37	5
West Bromwich Albion	2013–14	Premier League	32	1	1	0	2	0	—		35	1
West Bromwich Albion	2014–15	Premier League	33	2	3	2	1	0	—		37	4
West Bromwich Albion	2015–16	Premier League	18	3	1	1	0	0	—		19	4
West Bromwich Albion	2016–17	Premier League	31	5	1	0	1	0	—		33	5
West Bromwich Albion	2017–18	Premier League	4	1	0	0	2	0	—		6	1
West Bromwich Albion	2018–19	Championship	19	0	1	0	2	0	2 (Note: Appearances in Championship play-offs)	0	24	0
West Bromwich Albion	Total		309	34	19	5	11	0	2	0	341	39
Career total			375	37	32	6	15	1	16	3	438	47

=== International ===
Appearances and goals by national team and year
National team	Year	Apps	Goals
Scotland	2008	3	0
Scotland	2009	2	0
Scotland	2010	5	0
Scotland	2011	9	1
Scotland	2012	6	1
Scotland	2013	4	1
Scotland	2014	6	0
Scotland	2015	6	0
Scotland	2016	1	0
Scotland	2017	4	0
Total		46	3

Scotland score listed first, score column indicates score after each Morrison goal.

List of international goals scored by James Morrison
No.	Date	Venue	Cap	Opponent	Score	Result	Competition	Ref.
1	25 May 2011	Aviva Stadium, Dublin, Ireland	13	Wales	1–1	3–1	2011 Nations Cup	
2	12 October 2012	Cardiff City Stadium, Cardiff, Wales	24	Wales	1–0	1–2	2014 FIFA World Cup qualification	
3	14 August 2013	Wembley Stadium, London, England	28	England	1–0	2–3	Friendly	

== Managerial statistics ==
As of matches played 21 November 2026

Team	From	To	Record					Ref
Team	From	To	G	W	D	L	Win %	Ref
West Bromwich Albion (interim)	21 April 2025	3 May 2025	2	1	1	0	50.00	
West Bromwich Albion (interim)	6 January 2026	11 January 2026	1	0	1	0	0.00	
West Bromwich Albion	24 February 2026	Present	30	13	11	6	43.33	
Total			33	14	13	6	42.42	

== Honours ==
Middlesbrough Youth

- FA Youth Cup: 2003–04

Middlesbrough

- UEFA Cup runner-up: 2005–06

West Bromwich Albion

- Football League Championship: 2007–08; runner-up: 2009–10

Individual

- West Bromwich Albion Player of the Year: 2014–15
- SFWA International Player of the Year: 2011–12

== See also ==
- List of Scotland international footballers born outside Scotland
- List of Scotland national football team captains
