= Ishmael Miller =

English footballer (born 1987)

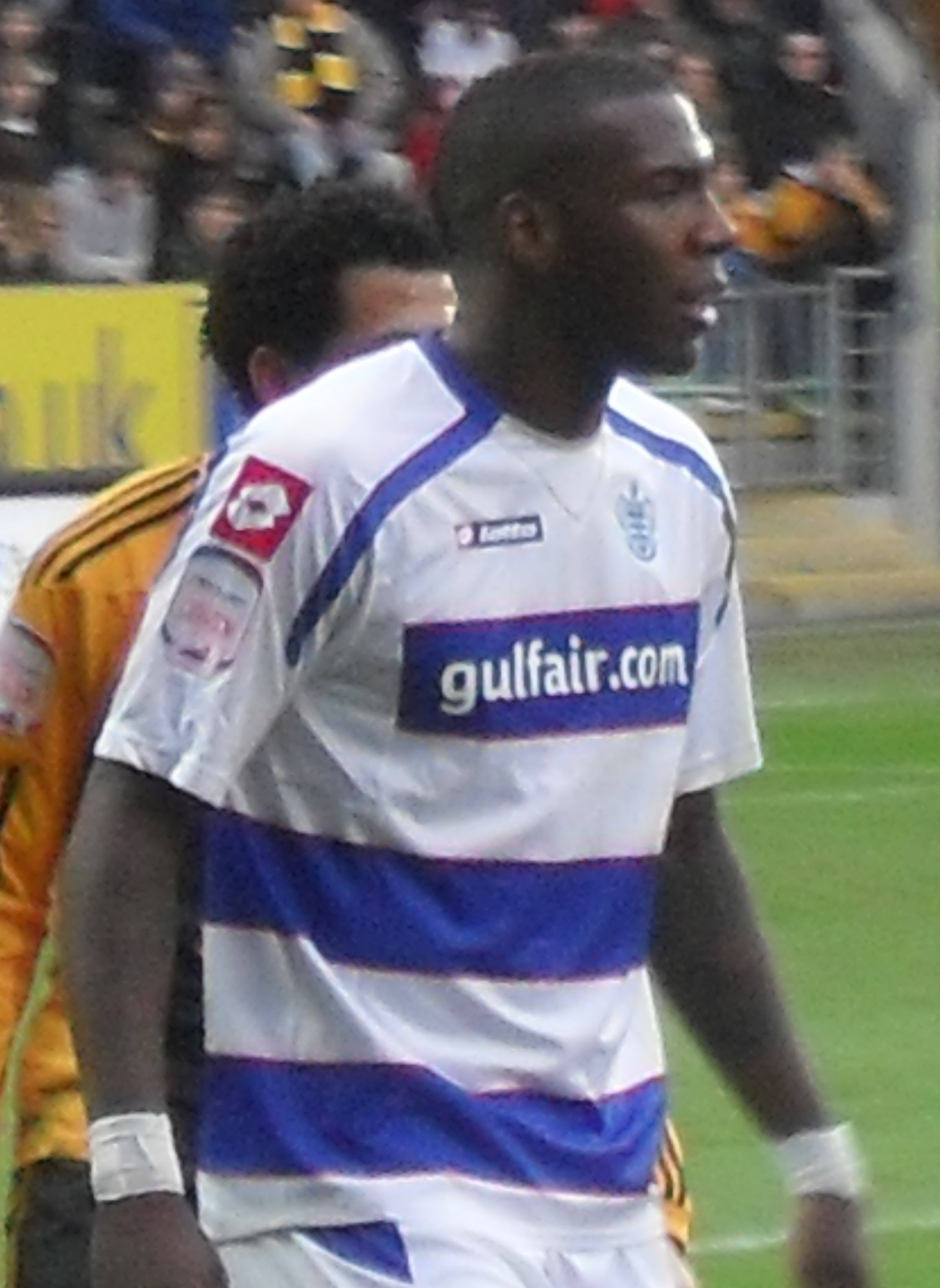
- Miller playing for Queens Park Rangers in 2011

Personal information
- Full name: Ishmael Anthony Miller
- Date of birth: 5 March 1987 (age 39)
- Place of birth: Manchester, England
- Height: 6 ft 0 in (1.82 m)
- Position: Striker

Youth career
- Manchester City

Senior career*
Years	Team	Apps	(Gls)
2005–2008	Manchester City	17	(0)
2007–2008	→ West Bromwich Albion (loan)	21	(7)
2008–2011	West Bromwich Albion	49	(7)
2011	→ Queens Park Rangers (loan)	12	(1)
2011–2014	Nottingham Forest	25	(3)
2012–2013	→ Middlesbrough (loan)	25	(5)
2013–2014	→ Yeovil Town (loan)	7	(3)
2014	→ Yeovil Town (loan)	12	(7)
2014–2015	Blackpool	22	(2)
2015–2016	Huddersfield Town	34	(4)
2016–2017	Bury	3	(0)
2018–2019	Oldham Athletic	16	(3)
2019–2020	Tranmere Rovers	2	(1)
Total		245	(43)
- * Club domestic league appearances and goals as of 18:51, 13 January 2019 (UTC)

Ishmael Anthony Miller (born 5 March 1987) is an English former professional footballer who played as a striker.

Beginning his career in the Premier League with Manchester City, he later played in the top flight for West Bromwich Albion where he was part of the team that had won promotion in 2008 and 2010. He spent almost the rest of his career playing in the EFL Championship for Queens Park Rangers, Nottingham Forest, Middlesbrough, Yeovil Town, Blackpool and Huddersfield Town. He later played with Bury, Oldham Athletic and Tranmere Rovers.

== Career ==
=== Manchester City ===
Miller was born in Manchester, Greater Manchester and was raised in the Moston district of the city. He signed professionally with Manchester City at the beginning of the 2005–06 season, and featured in a number of pre-season games for the first team. A number of impressive displays for the reserve team led to a competitive first team début, as a substitute in a Premier League match against Wigan Athletic on 18 March 2006. Miller made no further first team appearances that season, but was leading goalscorer for the reserves.

Miller featured regularly in Manchester City's first team pre-season matches in July and August 2006, including a goal in a friendly against Wrexham. He then proceeded to make substitute appearances in four of Manchester City's first six games of the season, and made his full début on 23 September 2006 in a 2–0 victory over West Ham United, and started the move which led to the opening goal. Although known as a striker in youth and reserve football, Miller first played for the Manchester City first team as an attacking midfielder.

==== Loan to West Bromwich Albion ====
On 18 July 2007, Miller had been linked with a move to Preston North End. On 13 August 2007, West Bromwich Albion manager Tony Mowbray confirmed that he was interested in taking Miller on a season-long loan. On 15 August Miller completed a season long loan to West Brom with a view to a permanent transfer. "Ishmael will give us a different option up front," Mowbray predicted. "He's a big, quick, powerful lad who is looking for an opportunity to play more regularly. He will increase competition for places with the other strikers we've already got at the club." He scored on his debut for West Bromwich Albion with an individual effort in their 2–0 home win against Preston North End on 18 August. He had been on the pitch for only seven minutes, having replaced Kevin Phillips, the other scorer in the game, in the 66th minute. He scored on his first start for Albion against Ipswich Town and helped the team to a 4–0 victory, before scoring twice in Albion's 4–2 home loss to Cardiff City. Miller's form during October led to his nomination for Championship player of the month, but the award went to Stoke City's on-loan defender Ryan Shawcross. He was further recognised later in November, when he received his first call-up to the England under-21s.

==== Return to City ====
In a 5 October interview, City manager Sven-Göran Eriksson confirmed that Miller was still part of his long-term plans. Amongst other things, Eriksson said, "We talked about it and we could not see why he should not have a new contract with us, but we were very keen that he go out on loan and it's working out very well for him" (referring to Miller's new three-year contract signed with Manchester City just as he went on loan), and "I saw the game (Queens Park Rangers) on TV last Sunday, and I thought he was fantastic. When he scored he went looking for someone, which I thought it would be his family or his girlfriend – but then they showed Micah Richards jumping up and down in the crowd!" .

=== West Bromwich Albion ===
On the last day of the January 2008 transfer window, Miller signed on a permanent deal to West Brom on a 3 1/2-year contract, for a fee that could rise to £1.4 million. On 9 March 2008 he scored a hat-trick in Albion's 5–1 win at Bristol Rovers in the FA Cup quarter-final. He scored his first Premier League goal in the 2–1 loss to Newcastle on 28 October 2008. His goal in the following game, a 2–2 draw against Blackburn Rovers, earned him the West Bromwich Albion Goal of the Season award. In December 2008, Miller sustained a serious injury to his knee (cruciate ligament) in a collision with Portsmouth goalkeeper David James and missed the rest of the 2008–09 season. Despite this, in October 2009, Miller signed a new contract, keeping him at Albion until June 2014. On 8 January 2010, he made his long-awaited comeback after almost 14 months out as a second-half substitute against Nottingham Forest.

==== Loan to Queen's Park Rangers ====
The arrival of Peter Odemwingie and Marc-Antoine Fortune, plus West Brom's preference to operate with a lone striker, restricted Miller's chances of first team football at West Brom. On 21 January 2011, Miller joined Football League Championship leaders Queen's Park Rangers on a 93-day loan. He scored his first and only goal for Rangers as he came off to the bench to grab a last minute winner against Leicester City, this winner proved to be vital as QPR won promotion to the Premier League. At the end of the loan period, he returned to West Bromwich Albion and made a substitute appearance in their defeat at Wolverhampton Wanderers on 8 May 2011.

=== Nottingham Forest ===
On 6 August 2011, West Brom manager Roy Hodgson indicated that Ishmael Miller was poised to sign for Nottingham Forest and acknowledged the player's need for regular first team football. However, although confirming initial negotiations had occurred with West Brom, Forest stressed that there had been no contact or talks at that time with either the player or his agent.

On 13 August 2011, Nottingham Forest announced that Miller would sign a three-year contract with the club the following Monday. Miller's transfer from West Brom to Forest was finalised on Monday 15 August. The transfer fee was an initial £1.2 million. West Brom's Sporting & Technical Director, Dan Ashworth, stated: "This move is probably in the best interests of all parties because we can't guarantee Ishmael first-team football and this is a great opportunity for him to hopefully play regularly". Miller said about the transfer: "I have got a point to prove. I've had a few injury problems over the last few years...I need to go out there and show what I can do. I'm relishing the new challenge at this stage of my career".

Miller made his first appearance for Forest as a substitute on 16 August 2011 in an away 1–0 win against Doncaster Rovers. On 24 August 2011, Miller scored his first goals for the club in the League Cup match against Wycombe Wanderers.

In October 2011, Miller was charged with misconduct by FA, and admitted the charge. It related to a post on his Twitter account. Miller had responded angrily on Twitter to fans' comments and was fined £2,500 by the FA for improper conduct and bringing the game into disrepute.

In May 2014, it was announced that Forest had opted not to renew Miller's contract following his various loan spells.

==== Loan to Middlesbrough ====
On 24 August 2012, Miller signed for Middlesbrough on a season-long loan. Miller made his debut for Boro' in their 2–1 victory over Crystal Palace on 25 August 2012, in which he started the game and was eventually substituted in the second half by Luke Williams. Miller scored his first goal for the club on 23 October 2012 in a 2–0 home win against Hull City.

==== Loan to Yeovil Town ====
On 28 November 2013, Miller joined fellow Championship side Yeovil Town on a months loan until January. Miller made his debut in Yeovil's 3–0 win away at Watford, on 30 November 2013, and scored a goal on his debut. Miller scored his second goal for Yeovil Town with a penalty kick on 7 November 2013, in a 2–2 home draw with Charlton Athletic. Miller returned to Nottingham Forest at the end of his loan spell having scored three goals in seven appearances for Yeovil.

On 23 January 2014, Miller rejoined Yeovil Town on loan until the end of the 2013–14 season. Miller scored a further seven goals in twelve league appearances for Yeovil to take his tally for the season to ten.

On 5 April 2014, Yeovil Town manager Gary Johnson revealed that Miller had played his last game for Yeovil, but would remain at Yeovil on loan unless Nottingham Forest recalled him.

=== Blackpool ===
After turning down an offer from Doncaster Rovers, on 22 July 2014 Miller trained with Blackpool and the two parties had almost reached an agreement on a contract, but Miller failed to show up to the signing. On 6 August 2014, Miller signed a one-year deal with the option of a further year ahead of the season opener against former club Nottingham Forest.

=== Huddersfield Town ===
On 2 February 2015, Miller joined Huddersfield Town on a short-term deal until the end of the 2014–15 season, with the option of a further year, taking the number 11 shirt recently vacated by Danny Ward. He made his début as a late substitute in the 3–1 win over Millwall on 7 February 2015. His first goal for the club came in the 3–0 win over Reading on 24 February 2015. Miller made 37 appearances for Huddersfield and scored four goals before seeing his contract expire at the end of the 2015–16 season.

=== Bury ===
On 14 October 2016, Miller signed for League One side Bury on a free transfer. He was released at the end of the 2016–17 season, having made 3 appearances, all as a substitute.

=== Oldham Athletic ===
On 2 August 2018, Miller signed for League Two side Oldham Athletic., but was released from his short-term contract on 3 January 2019

=== Tranmere Rovers ===
On 7 January 2019, Miller joined Tranmere Rovers. After two appearances for the club he was injured, and asked the club to stop paying his wages until he was fit again. He signed a new 6-month contract with the club in June 2019, but failed to make any further first team appearances.

== Career statistics ==
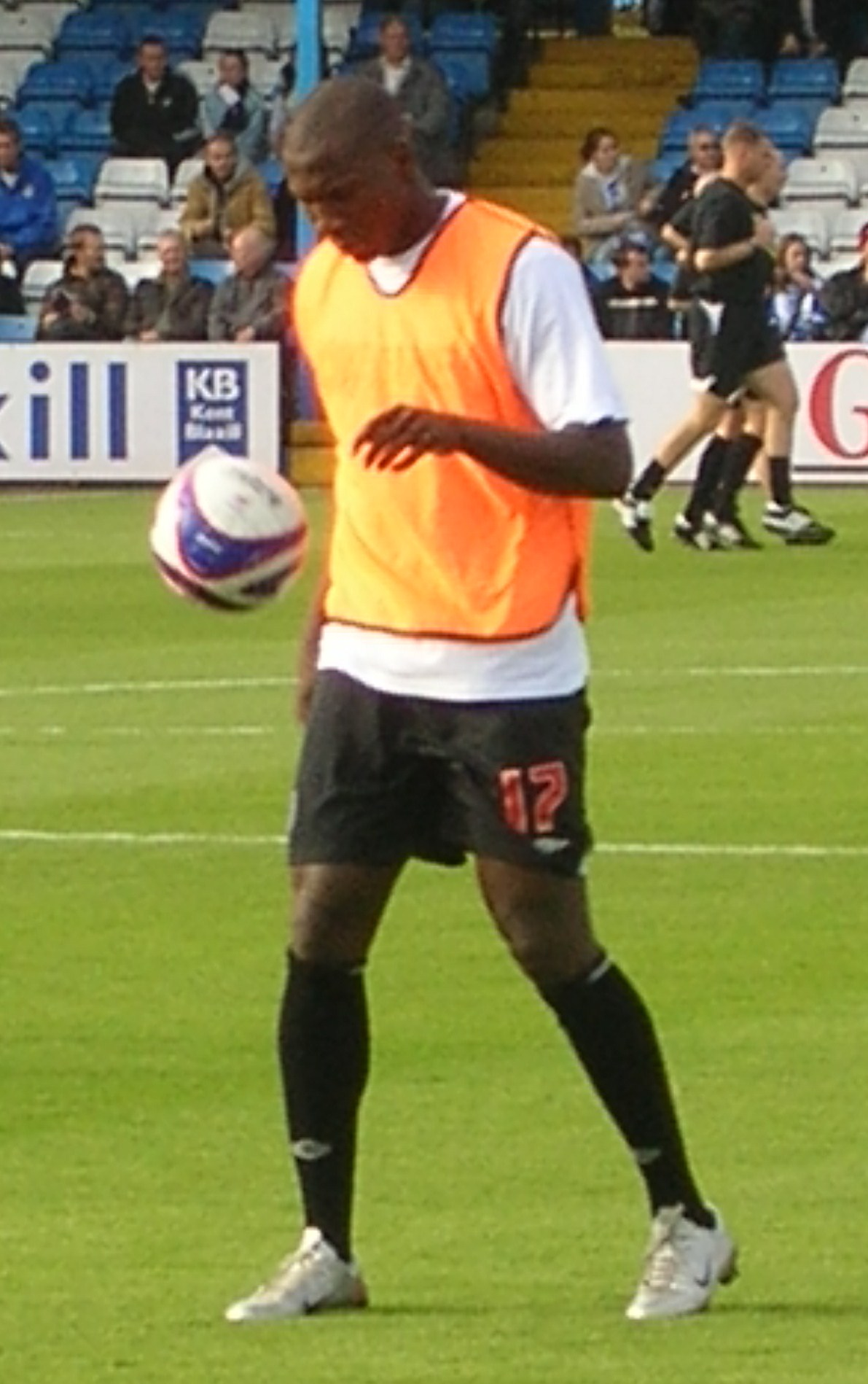
Miller warming up for West Bromwich Albion in 2007

As of match played 21 August 2018

Appearances and goals by club, season and competition
Club	Season	League			FA Cup		League Cup		Total	
Club	Season	Division	Apps	Goals	Apps	Goals	Apps	Goals	Apps	Goals
Manchester City	2005–06	Premier League	1	0	0	0	0	0	1	0
Manchester City	2006–07	Premier League	16	0	1	0	2	0	19	0
Manchester City	2007–08	Premier League	0	0	0	0	0	0	0	0
Manchester City	Total		17	0	1	0	2	0	20	0
West Bromwich Albion	2007–08	Championship	34	9	5	5	1	2	40	16
West Bromwich Albion	2008–09	Premier League	15	3	0	0	0	0	15	3
West Bromwich Albion	2009–10	Championship	15	2	1	0	0	0	16	2
West Bromwich Albion	2010–11	Premier League	6	0	1	0	2	0	9	0
West Bromwich Albion	Total		70	14	7	5	3	2	80	21
Queens Park Rangers (loan)	2010–11	Championship	12	1	0	0	0	0	12	1
Nottingham Forest	2011–12	Championship	21	3	0	0	2	1	23	4
Nottingham Forest	2012–13	Championship	0	0	0	0	0	0	0	0
Nottingham Forest	2013–14	Championship	4	0	0	0	3	0	7	0
Nottingham Forest	Total		25	3	0	0	5	1	30	4
Middlesbrough (loan)	2012–13	Championship	25	5	2	1	3	0	30	6
Yeovil Town (loan)	2013–14	Championship	19	10	1	0	0	0	20	10
Blackpool	2014–15	Championship	22	2	1	0	1	0	24	2
Huddersfield Town	2014–15	Championship	16	3	0	0	0	0	16	3
Huddersfield Town	2015–16	Championship	18	1	2	0	1	0	21	1
Huddersfield Town	Total		34	4	2	0	1	0	37	4
Bury	2016–17	League One	3	0	0	0	0	0	3	0
Oldham Athletic	2018–19	League Two	3	1	0	0	0	0	3	1
Career total			230	40	15	6	14	3	259	49

== Honours ==
West Bromwich Albion

- Football League Championship: 2007–08

Queens Park Rangers

- Football League Championship: 2010–11
