= Robert Koren =

Slovenian footballer (born 1980)

- Koren with Hull City in 2013

Personal information
- Full name: Robert Koren
- Date of birth: 20 September 1980 (age 46)
- Place of birth: Radlje ob Dravi, SR Slovenia, SFR Yugoslavia
- Height: 1.75 m (5 ft 9 in)
- Position: Midfielder

Youth career
- Radlje
- Dravograd

Senior career*
Years	Team	Apps	(Gls)
1996–2001	Dravograd	129	(17)
2001–2004	Celje	79	(22)
2004–2007	Lillestrøm	75	(19)
2007–2010	West Bromwich Albion	126	(16)
2010–2014	Hull City	143	(28)
2014–2016	Melbourne City	24	(3)
2017	Dravograd	7	(0)
Total		583	(105)

International career
1998	Slovenia U18	9	(1)
2000	Slovenia U20	3	(0)
2000–2001	Slovenia U21	14	(2)
2003	Slovenia B	1	(0)
2003–2011	Slovenia	61	(5)

Managerial career
- 2020–2021: Fužinar
- * Club domestic league appearances and goals

Robert Koren (born 20 September 1980) is a Slovenian retired footballer who played as a midfielder. Koren earned 61 caps and scored five goals for the Slovenia national team between 2003 and 2011 and played at the 2010 FIFA World Cup. Besides Slovenia, he has played in Norway, England, and Australia.

== Club career ==
=== Early career ===
Koren played for Dravograd and Celje in his home country, before transferring to Norwegian side Lillestrøm in 2004.

=== West Bromwich Albion ===
On 4 January 2007, Koren signed for English Championship club West Bromwich Albion in a Bosman ruling, penning an 18-month contract with a further year's option in the club's favour. He made his debut two days later as a late substitute in the Baggies' 3–1 win over Leeds United in the FA Cup third round. Koren scored his first goal for the club in a 7–0 home win against Barnsley on 6 May 2007, the last day of the league season. The victory ensured Albion's place in the Championship promotion play-offs. Koren started all three play-off games as Albion beat Wolves in the two-legged semi-final but lost 1–0 to Derby County in the Wembley final.

In July 2007 Koren suffered a freak accident in training when a ball hit him in the eye, causing internal bleeding and temporary loss of vision. Although he made a full recovery, he later admitted that he had feared for his sight. The injury meant that he missed the start of the 2007–08 season, but he returned to the side at the end of August as a substitute in a League Cup game against Peterborough. In mid-September he signed a new two-year contract at Albion, with a further year's option in the club's favour. He has been described by former West Brom manager Tony Mowbray as a "model pro". Koren's two goals in Albion's 3–2 defeat away at Southampton in October 2007 earned him a place in the Championship Team of the Week. Koren scored his first Premier League goal on 17 January 2009 and was named man of the match as Albion beat Middlesbrough 3–0. His goal in Albion's 2–2 draw with Burnley in the FA Cup earned him the ITV goal of the round. In the 2008–09 Premier League season, Koren proved his reliability and consistency by making the most appearances of the season for an outfield player at West Brom, only appearing fewer times than goalkeeper Scott Carson. Koren continued to be a regular starter during the 2009–10 season under new manager Roberto Di Matteo, making 34 league appearances and scoring 5 goals, including a brace in a 3–0 home win against Leicester City in April as West Brom sealed an immediate return to the top flight. Despite a strong end to the season, on 17 May 2010, Koren was released by West Brom after the club chose not to take up their option to extend his contract.

=== Hull City ===
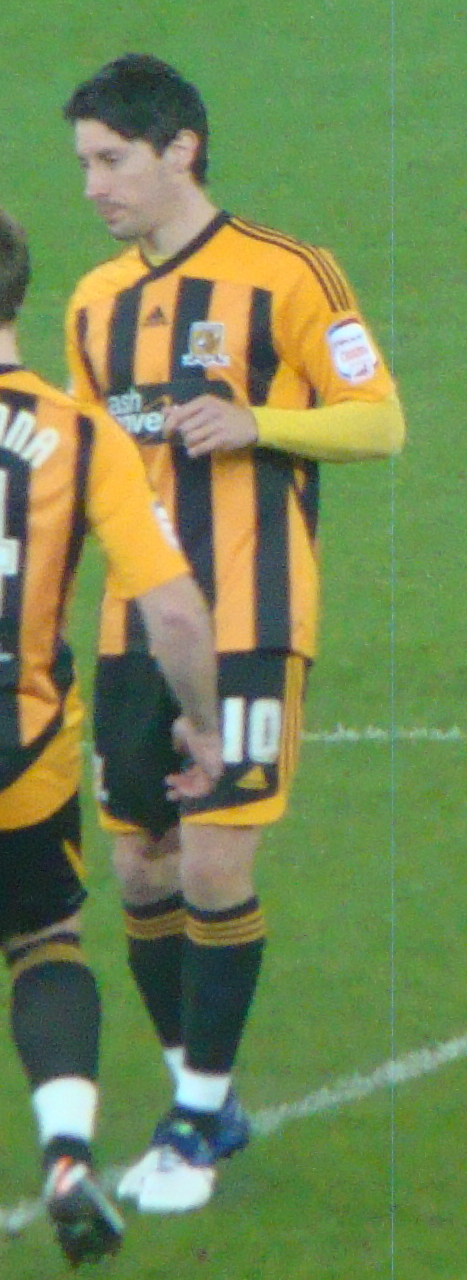
Koren playing for Hull City in 2012

On 13 August 2010, Koren joined Hull City on a free transfer, signing a two-year contract with an option of a third year. He made his debut for the club when he came on as a replacement for Will Atkinson at Millwall on 14 August 2010. He scored his first goal for the club in a 2–0 home victory over Derby County on 14 September 2010. He also scored goals away at Norwich City and Leicester City, including a 25-yard strike at home against Ipswich Town, and also scored what proved to be the winning goal in a 2–1 away victory over Watford.

On 24 September 2011, against Bristol City at Ashton Gate Stadium, Koren played a neat ball into Aaron McLean's feet and when the pass was returned, Koren stroked a lovely low shot into the bottom corner of the net. On 22 October 2011 against Watford at the KC Stadium, Koren picked up possession midway inside the City half, drifted past three Watford players before driving home into the bottom corner of the net from 25 yards. On 29 November 2011, against Southampton at St Mary's Stadium, a flowing move down the left ended with Tom Cairney pulling the ball back to Koren, whose shot deflected off Matty Fryatt and brought a stunning save out of Kelvin Davis. But the rebound fell for Koren, who nodded home from close range. On 3 December 2011, against Leicester City at the KC Stadium, the ball was rolled nicely into the path of Koren and he struck a beautiful shot past Schmeichel from 20 yards. On 7 December 2011, against Birmingham City at the KC Stadium, Cameron Stewart got to the byeline down the right before firing in a vicious cross that was only cleared as far as the penalty spot where Koren readjusted his body to volley into the net. On 17 December 2011, against Millwall at the KC Stadium, a long ball forward was headed down by a Millwall defender and it dropped nicely for Koren, who adjusted his feet well before firing home a low shot from 20 yards out.

On 11 August 2012, he signed a new two-year contract. On 15 September 2012, against Millwall at the KC Stadium, Koren picked up possession on the edge of the centre circle, advanced unchallenged before unleashing a powerful drive from 25 yards which flew past Taylor and into the net. After Hull's promotion to Premier League he was ruled out for four to five weeks for foot injury before the clash against Newcastle United.

=== Melbourne City ===
On 3 August 2014, Robert Koren was announced as a marquee signing for Melbourne City in the A-League. After missing the first 10 games of the season with injury, on 20 December 2014 Koren made his debut in the Melbourne Derby, coming on as a substitute. On 30 December 2014, Koren scored a hat trick against Newcastle Jets in his first starting game. On 21 January 2016, he was released from his contract to pursue new opportunities.

== International career ==
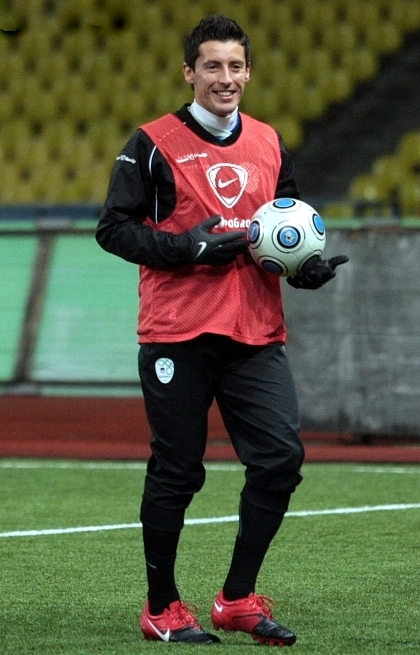
Koren training with Slovenia in 2009

Koren made his debut for Slovenia in an April 2003 European Championship qualification match against Cyprus and earned a total of 61 caps, scoring 5 goals. At the 2010 FIFA World Cup, he scored the only goal in the match against Algeria, helping Slovenia to their first-ever major tournament victory.

== Personal life ==
Koren is married and has two sons and a daughter. Both of his sons, Nal Lan and Tian Nai, are professional footballers.

== Career statistics ==
=== International ===
Appearances and goals by national team and year
National team	Year	Apps	Goals
Slovenia	2003	4	0
Slovenia	2004	5	0
Slovenia	2005	5	0
Slovenia	2006	7	1
Slovenia	2007	9	0
Slovenia	2008	5	1
Slovenia	2009	9	2
Slovenia	2010	11	1
Slovenia	2011	6	0
Total		61	5

Scores and results list Slovenia's goal tally first, score column indicates score after each Koren goal.

List of international goals scored by Robert Koren
No.	Date	Venue	Opponent	Score	Result	Competition
1	7 October 2006	Arena Petrol, Celje, Slovenia	Luxembourg	2–0	2–0	UEFA Euro 2008 qualification
2	19 November 2008	Ljudski vrt, Maribor, Slovenia	Bosnia and Herzegovina	1–2	3–4	Friendly
3	12 August 2009	Ljudski vrt, Maribor, Slovenia	San Marino	1–0	5–0	2010 World Cup qualification
4	12 August 2009	Ljudski vrt, Maribor, Slovenia	San Marino	4–0	5–0	2010 World Cup qualification
5	13 June 2010	Peter Mokaba Stadium, Polokwane, South Africa	Algeria	1–0	1–0	2010 FIFA World Cup

== Honours ==
West Bromwich Albion

- Football League Championship: 2007–08

Hull City

- Football League Championship runner-up: 2012–13
- FA Cup runner-up: 2013–14

Individual

- Kniksen Award: Midfielder of the year in 2006
- Hull City Player of the Season: 2011–12
- Hull City Goal of the Season: 2011–12
