= Paul Robinson (footballer, born December 1978) =

English footballer

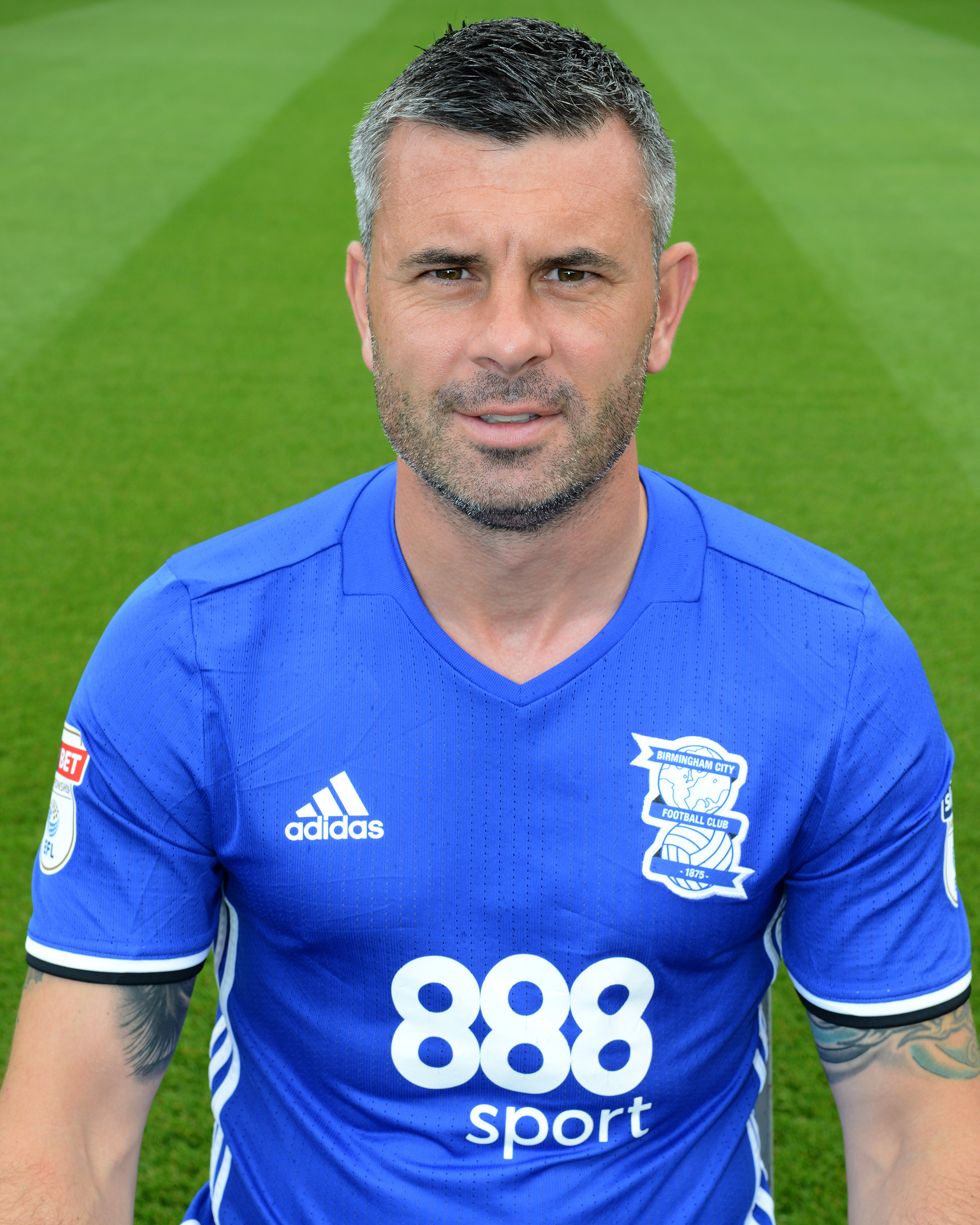
- Robinson with Birmingham City in 2016

Personal information
- Full name: Paul Peter Robinson
- Date of birth: 14 December 1978 (age 47)
- Place of birth: Watford, England
- Height: 5 ft 9 in (1.75 m)
- Position: Defender

Team information
- Current team: Oxford City (first-team coach)

Senior career*
Years	Team	Apps	(Gls)
1996–2003	Watford	219	(8)
2003–2010	West Bromwich Albion	214	(4)
2009–2010	→ Bolton Wanderers (loan)	10	(0)
2010–2012	Bolton Wanderers	67	(0)
2012	→ Leeds United (loan)	10	(0)
2012–2018	Birmingham City	158	(3)
Total		678	(15)

International career
1999	England U21	3	(0)
- * Club domestic league appearances and goals

Paul Peter Robinson (born 14 December 1978) is an English former professional footballer who played as a left-sided defender who is currently a first-team coach at Oxford City. Also capable of playing at centre-back, he represented five clubs in the Premier League and Football League between 1996 and 2018. He was capped three times for the England under-21 team in 1999.

Robinson began his professional career at Division Two side Watford in 1996, and made 252 appearances for the club, before moving to Division One side West Bromwich Albion in October 2003. He made 238 appearances for West Brom, before joining Premier League side Bolton Wanderers in July 2009, initially on loan, and then on a permanent transfer at the start of the 2010–11 season. Having made 87 appearances for Bolton, he went on loan to Championship side Leeds United in March 2012, where he made ten appearances. He was released by Bolton at the end of the 2011–12 season, and joined his final club, Birmingham City, on a free transfer in September 2012.

== Early and personal life ==
Robinson was born in Watford, Hertfordshire, and attended St. Michael's Catholic High School in Garston. He captained their football team to the English Schools' Football Association Under-16s Cup Final at Prenton Park, the home of Tranmere Rovers, in 1995.

Robinson is married to Caroline. As of October 2010, they have three sons, Luke, Jamie and Archie.

== Career ==
=== Watford ===
Robinson began his football career in the youth system of his hometown town club, Watford. He made his first-team debut as a second-minute substitute in a 1–1 draw against Luton Town on 29 October 1996, aged 17. He went on to make 12 more appearances that season. In Watford's Division Two Championship-winning season of 1997–98, Robinson was in and out of the side. He often played when the side reverted to the 4–4–2 formation from their usual 3–5–2. In 1998–99, with the club playing 4–4–2, Robinson became a regular half-way through the season and featured in the club's run to the play-offs.

In a match against Port Vale on 29 April 1999, Robinson made a poor tackle on Vale player Stewart Talbot, breaking both bones in Talbot's lower leg. The injury kept Talbot out of the game for 10 months and resulted in a "six-figure" out-of-court settlement. Out of 252 Watford appearances he was booked 63 times and sent off three times. One of these sendings off came in the 1998–99 play-off semi-final against Birmingham City, which saw him miss the second leg. He did feature, however, in the club's 2–0 play-off victory against future employers Bolton Wanderers.

Robinson made 32 appearances for Watford in their 1999–2000 FA Premier League season, and stayed with the club when they were relegated to Division One, making a further 124 league appearances for Watford in the second tier over the next four seasons and taking his totals to nine goals from 252 appearances in all competitions.

=== West Bromwich Albion ===
In October 2003 Robinson was sold to West Bromwich Albion for an initial £250,000 fee, potentially rising to £375,000 depending on appearances and Albion being promoted to the Premiership. He made his West Brom debut in a 1–0 win against Norwich City on 18 October.

Robinson was touted as a potential England left back by Bryan Robson and others. His first goal for West Brom was an injury-time headed equaliser at Villa Park in April 2005, which earned him the club's Goal of the Season award. The draw was one of several key results that enabled Albion's "Great Escape" from relegation.

In June 2006 Watford attempted to re-sign the player from West Brom for £1.4 million; however, this bid was rejected by manager Robson and chairman Jeremy Peace, as Robinson was considered vital if the team was to realise its ambition of a quick return to the Premier League. Robinson signed a new three-year contract with the club in July 2006.

On 28 October 2006, Birmingham City captain Damien Johnson's jaw was broken in two places in a collision with Robinson during a local derby, for which he received a straight red card. The incident drew criticism from Birmingham manager Steve Bruce, who believed Robinson's use of the elbow to be a deliberate act.

Robinson was the subject of a £1.5 million bid from Premier League team Wigan Athletic in August 2007 as a replacement for Leighton Baines, who had been sold to Everton. The move fell through when he failed a medical. In early November he was named in the Championship Team of the Week following Albion's 3–0 win at his former club Watford. He made the Team of the Week once again after Albion's 4–3 home win against Colchester United in March 2008. Robinson was named in the Professional Footballers' Association (PFA) Championship Team of the Year, alongside teammates Jonathan Greening and Kevin Phillips, after helping Albion win promotion to the Premier League as league champions.

=== Bolton Wanderers ===
On 12 July 2009, Robinson completed a season-long loan move to Bolton Wanderers, where he was reunited with his former manager Gary Megson. The player explained that he had joined Bolton on a three-year contract, the first year being on loan and the deal to become permanent in the summer of 2010 when Bolton would pay West Brom a fee of £1 million. He made his debut in a 1–0 loss to Sunderland on 15 August. The deal was made permanent in January 2010. He made 25 league appearances in the first season, and 35 in the following season, but fell out of favour in the 2011–12 Premier League season, only making 20 appearances in total for the club.

==== Leeds United (loan) ====
On 6 March 2012, Robinson joined Leeds United on a month's loan. He was an unused substitute for their away game at Hull City the same day, and made his debut in their 2–0 win at Middlesbrough on 11 March. Robinson's loan was extended to the end of the season. He was omitted from the last game of Leeds' season, because manager Neil Warnock was unwilling to risk his suffering injury in a "nothing" game as they were unlikely to sign him permanently. He returned to Bolton and was available for their last few matches, but was released when his contract expired at the end of the season, along with 11 other players, following the club's relegation from the Premier League.

=== Birmingham City ===
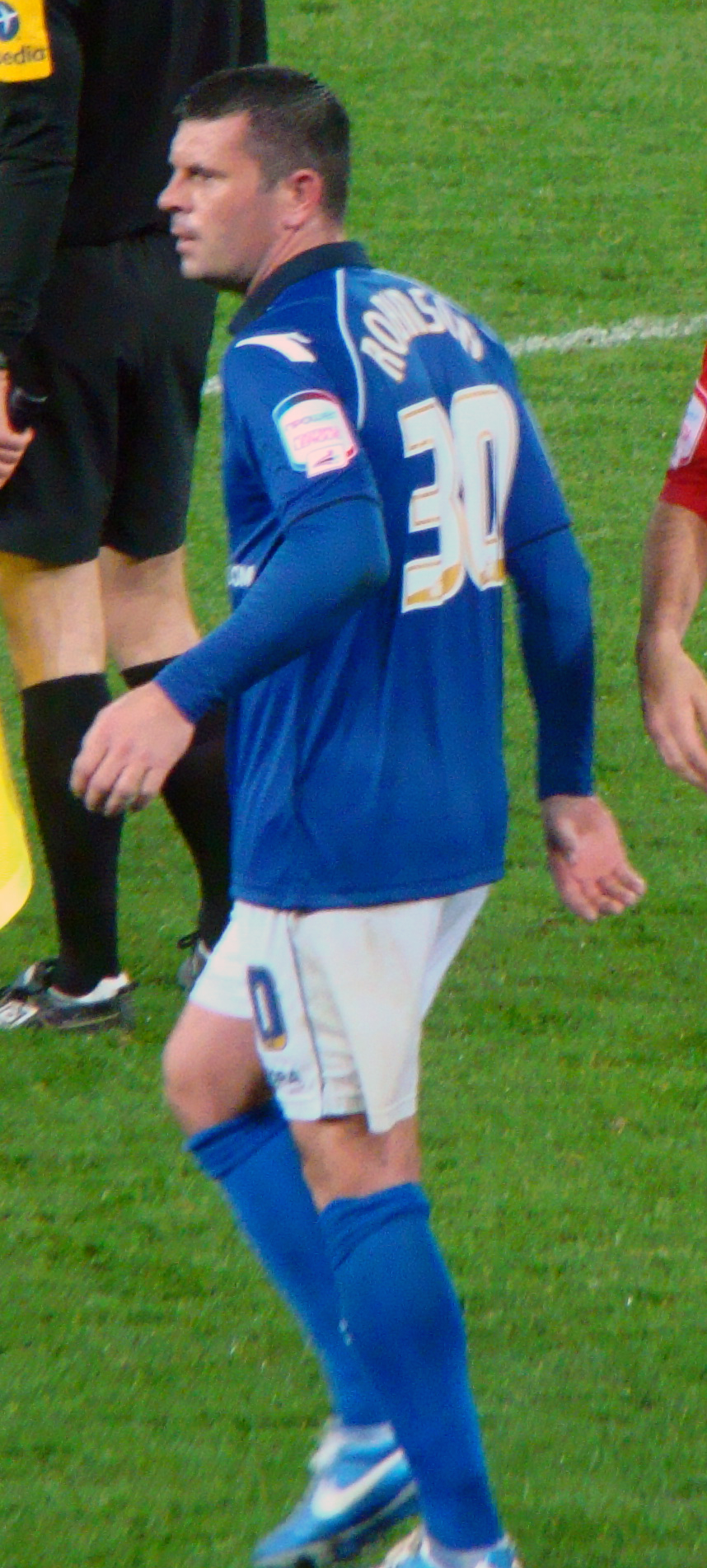
Playing for Birmingham in 2012

After training with MLS side Toronto FC and then with Championship club Birmingham City, Robinson signed a one-month contract with the latter in September 2012 after injuries had left the club with only two fit senior defenders. He made his debut in the starting eleven in a 1–0 away win against Brighton & Hove Albion on 29 September. After four appearances, and with the team still weakened in defence by injury, he was given a second month's contract, and then a further two months after left-back David Murphy suffered knee damage. When that deal expired, and despite the club's financial difficulties, his contract was extended until the end of the season. He finished the season playing at centre-half alongside Curtis Davies, having stood in for the injured Steven Caldwell and retained his place after Caldwell's return to fitness, and made 37 appearances in all competitions.

Robinson signed a one-year contract, with an option for a further year, ahead of the 2013–14 season, and was appointed both club and team captain for the 2013–14 season. He scored his first goal for the club – and his first goal for nearly five years – to open the scoring in a 3–0 defeat of Bristol Rovers in the FA Cup on 14 January 2014. In April 2014, with Birmingham battling relegation, he incurred a three-game suspension for receiving 15 bookings in the season, returning for the final day of the season as the Blues avoided relegation with a 2–2 draw at his former club Bolton. He won the club's Player of the Year award for that season.

In May 2014, it was announced he had agreed a player/coaching role with Birmingham.

Robinson was given a three-match ban after he was "seen to aim a kick" at Aston Villa captain James Chester in April 2017. The incident was missed by the match officials and dealt with using video evidence.

In February 2018, Robinson announced that he would retire at the end of the 2017–18 season. He made a brief appearance in Birmingham's last game of the season, as a 91st-minute substitute in their 3–1 victory over Fulham.

== Coaching career ==
After 175 first-team appearances at Birmingham City, he retired as a player in 2018 but remained with the club as assistant senior professional development coach working with the U23 team, and in June 2019 was appointed lead professional development coach, a post that included responsibility for the under-18s. He left the club in August 2020.

On 1 July 2021, he was appointed as first-team coach at Millwall working alongside Gary Rowett, one of his former managers at Birmingham. After leaving Millwall in November 2023, In March 2024, Robinson was named first-team technical coach of Birmingham City to assist Rowett, newly appointed as interim manager until the end of the season.

In October 2024, Robinson returned to former club Watford as assistant coach. In January 2025, his role changed to see him work on the opposition analysis team.

In February 2026, Robinson joined the first-team coaching staff of National League North club Oxford City.

== Career statistics ==
Appearances and goals by club, season and competition
Club	Season	League			FA Cup		League Cup		Other		Total	
Club	Season	Division	Apps	Goals	Apps	Goals	Apps	Goals	Apps	Goals	Apps	Goals
Watford	1996–97	Division Two	12	0	3	0	0	0	2 (Note: Appearance(s) in Football League Trophy)	0	17	0
Watford	1997–98	Division Two	22	2	2	0	0	0	1	0	25	2
Watford	1998–99	Division One	29	0	1	0	2	0	2 (Note: Appearance(s) in Football League First Division play-offs)	0	34	0
Watford	1999–2000	Premier League	32	0	1	0	3	0	—		36	0
Watford	2000–01	Division One	39	0	1	0	4	0	—		44	0
Watford	2001–02	Division One	38	3	0	0	5	1	—		43	4
Watford	2002–03	Division One	37	3	4	0	1	0	—		42	3
Watford	2003–04	Division One	10	0	—		1	0	—		11	0
Watford	Total		219	8	12	0	16	1	5	0	252	9
West Bromwich Albion	2003–04	Division One	31	0	1	0	—		—		32	0
West Bromwich Albion	2004–05	Premier League	30	1	3	0	0	0	—		33	1
West Bromwich Albion	2005–06	Premier League	33	0	1	0	2	0	—		36	0
West Bromwich Albion	2006–07	Championship	42	2	4	0	3	0	3 (Note: Appearance(s) in Football League Championship play-offs)	0	52	2
West Bromwich Albion	2007–08	Championship	43	1	4	0	1	0	—		48	1
West Bromwich Albion	2008–09	Premier League	35	0	2	1	0	0	—		37	1
West Bromwich Albion	Total		214	4	15	1	6	0	3	0	238	5
Bolton Wanderers	2009–10	Premier League	25	0	2	0	0	0	—		27	0
Bolton Wanderers	2010–11	Premier League	35	0	5	0	0	0	—		40	0
Bolton Wanderers	2011–12	Premier League	17	0	2	0	1	0	—		20	0
Bolton Wanderers	Total		77	0	9	0	1	0	—		87	0
Leeds United	2011–12	Championship	10	0	—		—		—		10	0
Birmingham City	2012–13	Championship	35	0	2	0	—		—		37	0
Birmingham City	2013–14	Championship	40	0	2	1	4	0	—		46	1
Birmingham City	2014–15	Championship	34	0	1	0	1	0	—		36	0
Birmingham City	2015–16	Championship	25	3	0	0	2	0	—		27	3
Birmingham City	2016–17	Championship	22	0	2	0	1	0	—		25	0
Birmingham City	2017–18	Championship	2	0	0	0	2	0	—		4	0
Birmingham City	Total		158	3	7	1	10	0	—		175	4
Career total			678	15	43	2	33	1	8	0	762	18

== Honours ==
Watford

- Football League First Division play-offs: 1999
- Football League Second Division: 1997–98

West Bromwich Albion

- Football League Championship: 2007–08

Individual

- PFA Team of the Year: 2007–08 Football League Championship
