= Danków =

Danków may refer to the following places:

- Danków, Greater Poland Voivodeship (west-central Poland)
- Danków, Lubusz Voivodeship (west Poland)
- Dańków, Łódź Voivodeship
- Dańków, Masovian Voivodeship
- Danków, Silesian Voivodeship (south Poland)
- Danków, Świętokrzyskie Voivodeship (south-central Poland)

== See also ==
- Dankov, Dankovsky District, Lipetsk Oblast, Russia
