= Danek =

Danek (Slovak feminine: Danková) is a Slavic surname and a given name. It is a pet form of the given names Daniel, Danylo, Bohdan, etc. However, it is also a Germanised form of the Czech surname Daněk. Notable people with the name include:

== Surname ==
- Adrian Danek (born 1994), Polish footballer
- Benedikt Danek (born 1986), Austrian basketball player
- Josef Danek, Austrian slalom canoeist
- Petra Danková (born 1984), Slovak ice hockey player
- Rozália Danková (1920–2017), Slovak Roman Catholic nun
- Włodzimierz Danek (1943–2022), Polish sport shooter

== Given name ==
- Danek Mozdzenski (born 1952), Canadian sculptor
- Danek Nowosielski (born 1966), Canadian fencer
