= Jan Daněk =

Czech footballer (born 1982)

Personal information
- Full name: Jan Daněk
- Date of birth: 22 November 1982 (age 43)
- Place of birth: Czechoslovakia
- Position: Defender

Senior career*
Years	Team	Apps	(Gls)
2005	FC Baník Ostrava	1	(0)
2005–2006	→ FK Viktoria Žižkov (loan)		
2006–2007	Jakubčovice Fotbal		
2007–?	FK Dukla Prague		
- * Club domestic league appearances and goals

Jan Daněk (born 22 November 1982) is a Czech former footballer who played as a defender. He played in the Czech First League for Baník Ostrava. He is the son of Václav Daněk, who played football for Czechoslovakia as a striker.
