= Juan Carlos Menseguez =

Argentine footballer

Personal information
- Date of birth: 18 February 1984 (age 42)
- Place of birth: Córdoba, Argentina]
- Height: 1.74 m (5 ft 9 in)
- Positions: Winger; forward

Team information
- Current team: Juventud Unida

Youth career
- 1989–2003: River Plate

Senior career*
Years	Team	Apps	(Gls)
2003	River Plate	0	(0)
2003–2007	VfL Wolfsburg	102	(4)
2007–2013	San Lorenzo	81	(14)
2009	→ West Brom (loan)	7	(1)
2013–2014	River Plate	12	(1)
2014–2015	Argentinos Juniors	6	(0)
2015–2016	Aldosivi	9	(0)
2016–2017	Juventud Unida	14	(0)
Total		231	(20)
- * Club domestic league appearances and goals

Juan Carlos Menseguez (born 18 February 1984) is an Argentine former professional footballer who played as a winger or forward.

== Career ==
Menseguez was born in Córdoba. He started playing football for River Plate in Buenos Aires at the age of 15. Before making his debut for River Plate he was transferred to Bundesliga club VfL Wolfsburg.

In the summer of 2007, Menseguez signed for Argentine team, San Lorenzo. On 2 February 2009, Menseguez moved to West Bromwich Albion on loan, with a view to making the deal permanent. He scored his debut goal after coming on as a substitute to secure a 3–0 league victory for West Brom against Sunderland. The club released him at the end of the season on 1 June. After his spell at West Brom, he returned to San Lorenzo as no offers were made for a permanent transfer to the Premier League.

After playing little during 2011, Menseguez sustained an injury which left him out off the field for all of 2012.

San Lorenzo decided to let him leave the club and join River Plate during the winter of 2013.

He moved to Juventud Unida in 2016.
