= Václav Daněk =

Czech footballer

Personal information
- Date of birth: 22 December 1960 (age 65)
- Place of birth: Ostrava, Czechoslovakia
- Height: 1.86 m (6 ft 1 in)
- Position: Forward

Youth career
- Baník Ostrava

Senior career*
| Years | Team | Apps | (Gls) |
| 1979–1983 | Baník Ostrava | 104 | (34) |
| 1983–1985 | Dukla Prague | 41 | (12) |
| 1985–1989 | Baník Ostrava | 96 | (65) |
| 1989–1991 | FC Swarovski Tirol | 56 | (44) |
| 1991–1992 | Le Havre AC | 17 | (3) |
| 1992–1995 | FC Tirol Innsbruck | 88 | (39) |
| Total | | 402 | (197) |

International career
| 1982–1991 | Czechoslovakia | 22 | (9) |

Managerial career
- 2003: FK Drnovice
- 2004: FC Vítkovice
- 2004–2005: Dukla Banská Bystrica
- 2005–2006: FC Vítkovice
- 2007–2008: Fotbal Fulnek
- 2010: FC Hlučín
- * Club domestic league appearances and goals

Václav Daněk (born 22 December 1960) is a Czech former professional footballer who played as a forward. He played 22 matches for Czechoslovakia and scored nine goals. At club level in total, Daněk scored 197 league goals in 402 games.

== Club career ==
Daněk scored the first goal on his debut for Baník Ostrava in a 6–0 victory against Orduspor at the 1979–80 UEFA Cup. This witnessed the golden era in the club's history, contributing to two Czechoslovak First League championships.

== International career ==
After the 1990 FIFA World Cup, Jozef Vengloš was replaced by Milan Máčala, who gave Daněk his full confidence, making him the team's new standard bearer and first pick-up choice for the attack.

A few days prior to the UEFA Euro 1992 qualifying match between Czechoslovakia and Spain in 1991, Daněk's infant son was badly injured in an accident and had to be hospitalized, leading Daněk to declare himself unavailable for the match. In the following days, all three other Czech strikers were injured during training or in their league matches, which left Máčala completely without forwards. He called Daněk just hours before the match, to which the latter agreed. Without any previous training or tactical coaching advice, Daněk played the game. With Spain leading 2–1, he scored twice in the second half against Andoni Zubizarreta and was named Man of the Match.

== Style of play ==
His strong temper contributed towards him not being picked for the Czechoslovakia squad that reached the quarter-finals of the 1990 FIFA World Cup, when he was at the peak of his career in Austria, playing for FC Tirol Innsbruck. Despite this, Daněk was selected Best Player in the Austrian league and finished top scorer three consecutive seasons which allowed him to finish third in the 1991 European Golden Boot contest sponsored by the magazine France Football.

== Personal life ==
Daněk's has two children, including Jan, who played football in the Czech First League in the 2000s. After retiring from professional football, Daněk began construction of an indoor swimming pool in Brušperk in 2015. He lives in Brušperek and occasionally appears on TV as co-host.
