= Roman Bednář =

Czech footballer

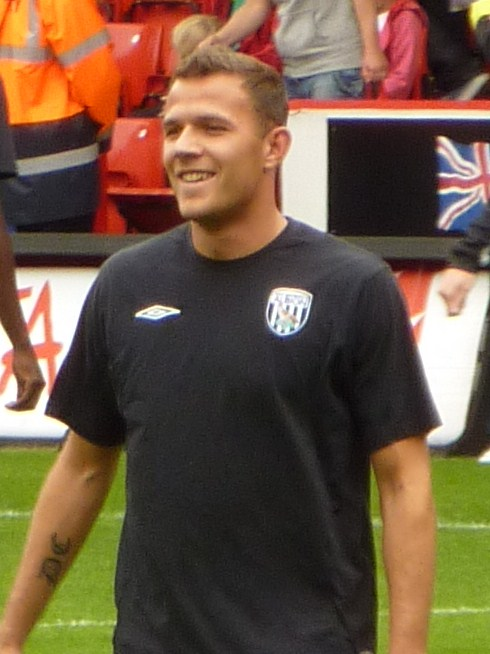
- Bednář with West Bromwich Albion in 2009

Personal information
- Full name: Roman Bednář
- Date of birth: 26 March 1983 (age 43)
- Place of birth: Prague, Czechoslovakia
- Height: 6 ft 4 in (1.93 m)
- Position: Forward

Team information
- Current team: Slavoj Vyšehrad (manager)

Youth career
- 1990–1999: ČAFC Prague
- 1999–2002: Bohemians 1905

Senior career*
Years	Team	Apps	(Gls)
2002–2005	Mladá Boleslav	70	(23)
2005–2006	FBK Kaunas	0	(0)
2005–2006	→ Heart of Midlothian (loan)	22	(7)
2006–2008	Heart of Midlothian	18	(4)
2007–2008	→ West Bromwich Albion (loan)	29	(13)
2008–2012	West Bromwich Albion	56	(17)
2010	→ Leicester City (loan)	5	(0)
2010–2011	→ Ankaragücü (loan)	8	(1)
2012	Blackpool	9	(1)
2012	Sivasspor	0	(0)
2013–2015	Sparta Prague	39	(9)
2015	→ Příbram (loan)	12	(5)
2015–2016	Příbram	25	(7)
Total		297	(87)

International career^{‡}
2002–2003	Czech Republic U20	10	(0)
2004–2005	Czech Republic U21	4	(2)
2006–2010	Czech Republic	8	(1)

Managerial career
- Meteor Prague (youth)
- Bohemians 1905 (youth)
- 2023–2024: Příbram (assistant)
- 2024: Příbram
- 2024–2025: Motorlet Prague
- 2026–: Slavoj Vyšehrad
- * Club domestic league appearances and goals as of 28 February 2016 ‡ National team caps and goals as of 28 February 2016

Roman Bednář (born 26 March 1983) is a Czech football coach and former player.

== Club career ==
=== Czech Republic ===
Born in Prague, Bednář started his career as a youth player at ČAFC Prague before he stepped up to Czech First League side FC Bohemians Praha in 1998. In 2002, after failing to break into the first team at Bohemians, he moved to Czech Second Division side FK Mladá Boleslav. Bednář finished the 2003–04 season as top scorer with 10 goals as Mladá Boleslav won the Second Division title.

=== Heart of Midlothian ===
On 27 July 2005, Hearts announced that they had completed the signing of Bednář on a one-year loan deal from FBK Kaunas. He scored on his debut against Kilmarnock, and also in the 3–0 away victory over Dundee United. Bednář then cemented his place in Hearts folklore by scoring the only goal in the 1–0 victory over Rangers at Tynecastle. It was in this game, however, that he suffered a serious knee injury that ruled him out for most of the campaign. He made his return on 26 November against Motherwell in a 1–1 draw, and played his part in Hearts' successful second-place finish and Scottish Cup victory.

Bednář started the 2006–07 Scottish Premier League season in a rich vein of form, scoring three times, twice in the 2–1 victory over Celtic at Tynecastle.

Bednář joined Hearts on a permanent deal on 31 August 2006, but exactly a year later he moved to West Bromwich Albion on a season-long loan deal, which later turned into a permanent move.

=== West Bromwich Albion ===
Bednář scored his first goals in a West Brom shirt on 15 October 2007, netting twice in a 4–1 win for the Albion reserves against Lincoln City reserves. On 24 October, he scored a hat-trick for the reserves in a 6–1 win over Oldham Athletic reserves. He made his first team debut for Albion as a substitute in a 3–0 away win against Watford on 3 November 2007. In January 2008, Bednář scored the winning penalty in the shootout against Charlton Athletic in the FA Cup third round. He won the Midland Player of the Month award for January 2008. Bednář finished the 2007–08 season with 17 goals from 22 starts.

At the end of his loan spell, West Bromwich Albion exercised an option to purchase him. Bednář signed a three-year contract, with Albion paying Hearts £2.3 million for the player, in addition to the £200,000 loan fee they had paid previously. In the summer of 2008 he underwent a hernia operation.

Bednář was suspended by West Bromwich Albion in May 2009 over allegations that he had purchased drugs. The following month he was cautioned by West Midlands Police regarding the incident, for possessing small amounts of class A drugs (principally cocaine) as well as cannabis, a class B drug. The Football Association suspended the player for three months, backdated to the date his club suspended him, and he was allowed to continue his playing career on 17 August 2009. He returned to the side on 26 August in a League Cup tie at Rotherham United, and three days later he scored both of West Brom's goals in a 2–2 draw away to Sheffield United. On 17 October 2009, Bednář suffered a back injury (a trapped nerve) in the early stages of Albion's game against Reading. He returned to training after just over a week, and was an unused substitute in the 5–0 victory over Watford on 31 October. On 24 November 2010, Bednář joined Leicester City on loan until January 2011, making his debut in a 1–0 win over Nottingham Forest on 29 November. West Brom accepted a £1.2 million offer from Bristol City in January 2011. However, Bednář turned down the move. Bednář subsequently joined Turkish club Ankaragücü on loan for the remainder of the 2010–11 season.

Bednář returned to the Baggies after his loan spell ended and the club took up the option to extend his contract until the end of 2011–12 season. He was assigned the squad number 43 after his previous squad number 9 had been assigned to new signing Shane Long. Bednář's only appearance during the 2011–12 season was as a substitute in a League Cup win over AFC Bournemouth in August 2011. In four and a half years with West Brom, he made a total of 105 appearances, scoring 34 goals.

=== Blackpool ===
On 28 January 2012, Bednář joined Blackpool on a free transfer, signing a six-month contract. He made his debut three days later, as a late substitute against Coventry City, setting up former Baggies teammate Kevin Phillips for an 87th-minute equalizer in a 2–1 win at Bloomfield Road. He scored his first goal for the club in a substitute appearance against Leicester City on 21 March. However, he was injured and needed to be substituted less than 15 minutes after coming on.

=== Sivasspor ===
On 8 August 2012, Bednář signed a two-year contract with Turkish Süper Lig side Sivasspor.

== International career ==
On 16 August 2006, Bednář made his debut for the Czech Republic national team in their 3–1 defeat by Serbia.

== Career statistics ==
Club performance			League		Cup		League Cup		Continental		Total	
Season	Club	League	Apps	Goals	Apps	Goals	Apps	Goals	Apps	Goals	Apps	Goals
Scotland			League		Scottish Cup		League Cup		Europe		Total	
2005–06	Heart of Midlothian	Scottish Premier League	22	7	2	0	0	0	—		24	7
2006–07	Heart of Midlothian	Scottish Premier League	18	4	2	1	1	0	5	1	25	6
England			League		FA Cup		League Cup		Europe		Total	
2007–08	West Bromwich Albion	Championship	29	13	5	4	0	0	—		34	17
2008–09	West Bromwich Albion	Premier League	26	6	4	0	1	0	—		31	6
2009–10	West Bromwich Albion	Championship	27	11	4	0	1	0	—		32	11
2010–11	West Bromwich Albion	Premier League	3	0	0	0	3	0	—		6	0
2010–11	Leicester City (loan)	Championship	3	0	0	0	0	0	—		3	0
2011–12	West Bromwich Albion	Premier League	0	0	0	0	1	0	–		1	0
2007–12	West Bromwich Albion Total		85	30	13	4	6	0	–		104	34
2011–12	Blackpool	Championship	9	1	0	0	0	0	–		9	1
Total	Czech Republic		70	40	0	0	0	0	—		70	40
Total	Scotland		40	11	4	1	1	0	5	1	50	13
Total	England		97	31	8	4	6	0	—		111	35
Career total			207	65	12	5	7	0	5	1	231	71

=== International goals ===
As of match played 11 August 2010. Czech Republic score listed first, score column indicates score after each Bednář goal.

International goals by date, venue, cap, opponent, score, result and competition
No.	Date	Venue	Cap	Opponent	Score	Result	Competition
1	11 August 2010	Stadion u Nisy, Liberec, Czech Republic	4	Latvia	1–0	4–1	Friendly

== Honours ==
Heart of Midlothian

- Scottish Cup: 2005–06

West Bromwich Albion

- Football League Championship: 2007–08

Sparta Prague

- Czech First League: 2013–14
- Czech Cup: 2013–14
