= Shelton Martis =

Curaçaoan footballer (born 1982)

Personal information
- Full name: Shelton Demetrio Martis
- Date of birth: 29 November 1982 (age 43)
- Place of birth: Willemstad, Netherlands Antilles (present-day Curaçao)
- Height: 1.85 m (6 ft 1 in)
- Position: Defender

Senior career*
Years	Team	Apps	(Gls)
2002–2004	Excelsior	22	(0)
2004–2005	FC Eindhoven	32	(0)
2005–2006	Darlington	42	(2)
2006–2007	Hibernian	27	(0)
2007–2010	West Bromwich Albion	22	(2)
2008	→ Scunthorpe United (loan)	3	(0)
2008	→ Doncaster Rovers (loan)	5	(1)
2010–2013	Doncaster Rovers	64	(2)
2014	Osotspa Saraburi	17	(1)
2015–2016	SteDoCo	8	(0)
Total		242	(8)

International career
2008	Netherlands Antilles	3	(0)
2014–2015	Curaçao	10	(1)
- * Club domestic league appearances and goals

Shelton Demetrio Martis (born 29 November 1982) is a Curaçaoan former professional footballer who played as a defender.

He began his career at Excelsior and FC Eindhoven in the Dutch Eerste Divisie before spending a season at Darlington. He then moved to Hibernian of the Scottish Premier League in 2006, winning the Scottish League Cup in his only season. Martis then signed for West Bromwich Albion for £50,000 and became the first Curaçaoan to play in the Premier League. After three and a half years at Doncaster Rovers, and a season at Osotspa Saraburi in the Thai Premier League, he returned to the Netherlands with SteDoCo.

Martis played three matches for the Netherlands Antilles in 2008. After a territorial reorganisation, he represented Curaçao.

== Club career ==
=== Early career ===
Born in Willemstad, Curaçao, Netherlands Antilles, Martis came through the youth ranks at Dutch club Feyenoord before making his debut for their Rotterdam neighbours Excelsior, and FC Eindhoven.

He joined English League Two club Darlington in 2005, and made his debut for the Quakers on 6 August 2005 by playing the full 90 minutes as they began the season with a 1–1 draw at Rushden & Diamonds. His first goal came the following 28 January in a 4–0 win against Mansfield Town at the Darlington Arena, exploiting a mistake by visiting captain Alex Baptiste. He added another goal on 13 March, the only one in a home win against Chester City, heading in Neil Wainwright's corner kick.

After his only full season in North East England, Martis played on a week-to-week contract after turning down a full new contract.

=== Hibernian ===
Martis moved to Scottish Premier League club Hibernian on 14 August 2006 on a three-year deal. He was signed by Tony Mowbray, who stated that the team had been coveting him for some time as a young "composed, athletic and competitive defender". The transfer fee was nominal for a technicality because he was moving between countries. He made his debut five days later in a 3–1 win over Motherwell at Easter Road; he had a chance to score but controlled the ball with his chest rather than heading it.

He played all five of Hibs' matches as they won the Scottish League Cup, coming on as an added-time substitute for Steven Whittaker in the final, a 5–1 win over Kilmarnock at Hampden Park on 18 March 2007. In his last match, a 2–0 Edinburgh derby loss away to Heart of Midlothian on 12 May, he made an error which led to a Michal Pospíšil goal in the first 30 seconds, and he was substituted at half time for Kevin McCann.

Towards the end of his season in the Scottish capital, Martis was one of several players who fell out with manager John Collins, leading to reports that he could return to Darlington.

=== West Bromwich Albion ===
Martis returned to England on 2 July 2007, signed for Football League Championship club West Bromwich Albion for £50,000 on a two-year deal with the option for a third. He was again signed by Mowbray, who called him a player with potential although not the "finished article". He made his debut for the club on 25 September in a 4–2 League Cup third round defeat at The Hawthorns against fellow division team Cardiff City. His league debut came on 8 December, a 2–1 win away to Leicester City.

On 4 January 2008 Martis joined another Championship team, Scunthorpe United, on loan for an initial period of one month. The following day, he made his debut for the Iron in the third round of the FA Cup, a 1–0 loss at Preston North End, and later played three league games for the team. After returning, he played only one more game for eventual champions West Brom, their 1–4 home loss to Leicester on 15 March.

On 31 October 2008, Martis moved to Championship team Doncaster Rovers on loan for an initial period of one month to cover for some injured players. He made his debut the following day in a goalless draw against Swansea City at the Keepmoat Stadium, and in his next game two weeks later he scored the only goal of a 1–0 home win over Ipswich Town, heading the ball in for a first victory in 13 games.

Martis made his first Premier League appearance for the Baggies on 16 March 2009 in a goalless draw at West Ham United; this made him the first player from Curaçao in the division. On 17 May, in the last game of the season at home to Liverpool, he was dispossessed by Steven Gerrard who scored the first goal of a 2–0 win, relegating West Bromwich Albion after only one season.

Martis scored his first goal for West Brom in their first match of the new Championship season on 8 August 2009, opening a 1–1 draw with fellow relegated team Newcastle United. He also equalised in a 3–1 home win over Plymouth Argyle on 12 September.

=== Doncaster ===
Martis signed for Doncaster Rovers on 1 February 2010, on a three-and-a-half-year contract for an undisclosed fee. He made his debut five days later in a 2–1 home loss to Reading. On 24 April 2010, Martis scored a header from Dean Shiels' corner in the 89th minute against local rivals Scunthorpe, winning the match 4–3 at the Keepmoat.

He played consistently often over the next three seasons, the last of which was in Football League One. Marts was released on 21 February 2013 after 73 appearances and 3 goals.

=== Osotspa Saraburi ===
On 26 February 2014, Martis signed a one-year deal at Thai Premier League club Osotspa Saraburi. He made his debut on 9 March in the second game of the season, a 1–0 home loss to Port, replacing Kriengsak Chumpornpong for the final minute. His only goal in Thailand came on 18 May, a penalty to open a 2–1 win over Samut Songkhram at the Saraburi Stadium.

=== SteDoCo ===
In September 2015, Martis returned to the Netherlands for the first time in a decade, training at Topklasse (third-tier) club SteDoCo. The following month, he signed for the team.

== International career ==
Martis made his international debut for the Netherlands Antilles on 6 February 2008, in a 1–0 away win over Nicaragua in the first round of qualification for the 2010 FIFA World Cup. He played two more games over the year.

After territorial reorganisation, Martis returned to international football with Curaçao in 2014. He scored on his debut on 3 September, equalising for a 2–2 draw against Puerto Rico at the Estadio Juan Ramón Loubriel in Bayamón, in qualification for the 2015 CONCACAF Gold Cup.

== Career statistics ==
Scores and results list Curaçao's goal tally first.

No	Date	Venue	Opponent	Score	Result	Competition
1.	3 September 2014	Juan Ramón Loubriel Stadium, Bayamón, Puerto Rico	Puerto Rico	2–2	2–2	2014 Caribbean Cup qualification

== Honours ==
Hibernian

- Scottish League Cup: 2006–07
