= Michal Daněk =

Czech footballer (born 1983)

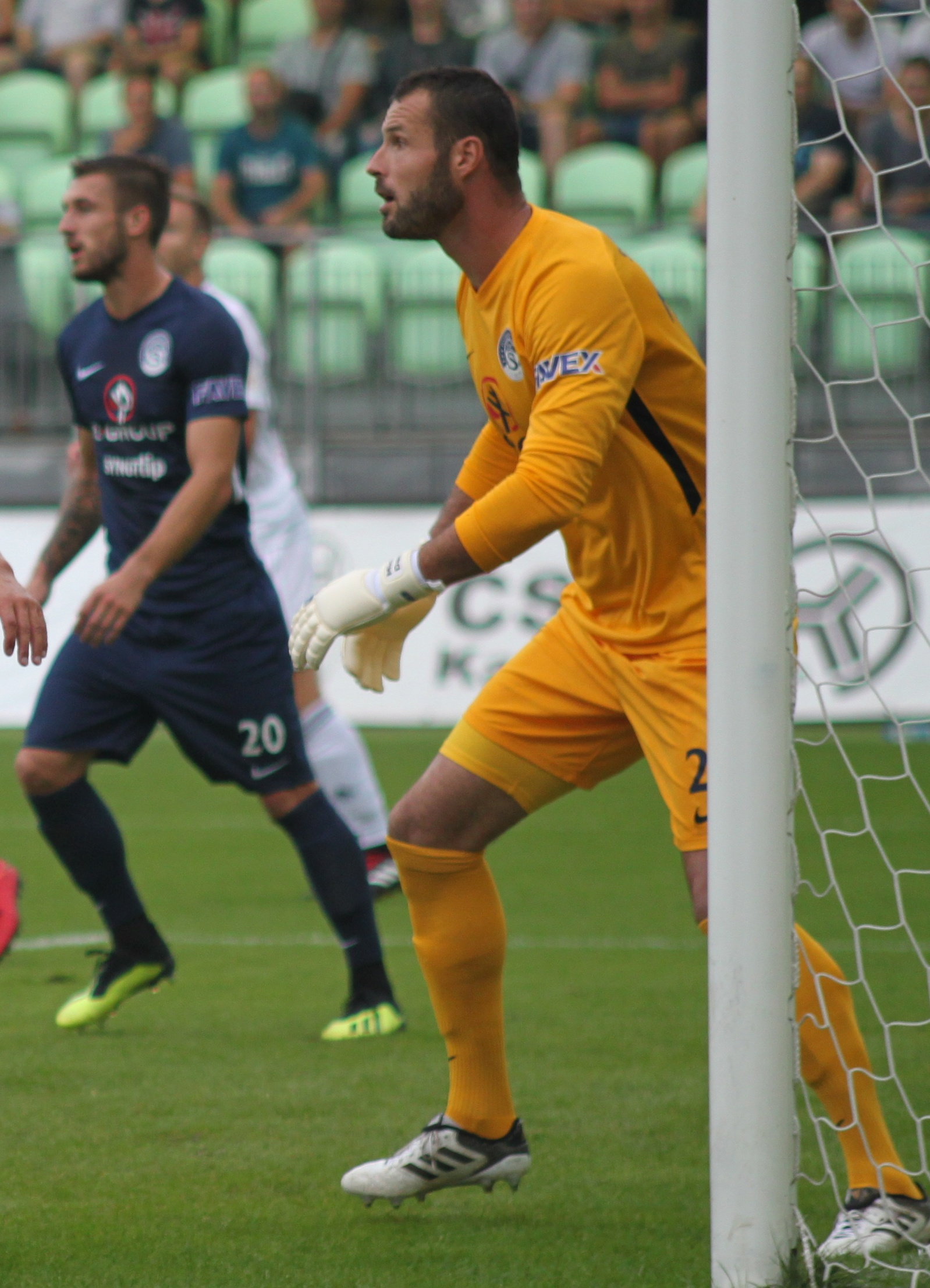
- Daněk in 2018

Personal information
- Date of birth: 6 July 1983 (age 43)
- Place of birth: Ostrava, Czechoslovakia
- Height: 1.95 m (6 ft 5 in)
- Position: Goalkeeper

Team information
- Current team: Baník Ostrava (goalkeeper coach)

Youth career
- 1989–1981: Hlučín
- 1991–2002: Baník Ostrava

Senior career*
Years	Team	Apps	(Gls)
2002–2004	Baník Ostrava	0	(0)
2004–2005	Kladno	18	(0)
2005	Chmel Blšany	16	(0)
2005–2006	Baník Ostrava	0	(0)
2006–2012	Viktoria Plzeň	77	(0)
2008	→ West Bromwich Albion (loan)	0	(0)
2010–2011	→ Baník Ostrava (loan)	18	(0)
2012	→ České Budějovice (loan)	12	(0)
2012–2014	České Budějovice	37	(0)
2014	→ Střížkov (loan)	8	(0)
2014	Střížkov		(0)
2015–2020	Slovácko	26	(0)
2020	Hlučín	1	(0)
2020	Baník Ostrava B	0	(0)
2021	Tj Řepiště		

International career
1998–1999	Czech Republic U15	5	(0)
1999–2000	Czech Republic U16	16	(0)
2000–2001	Czech Republic U17	10	(0)
2001	Czech Republic U18	1	(0)
2001–2002	Czech Republic U19	9	(0)
2002–2003	Czech Republic U20	9	(0)
2004	Czech Republic U21	1	(0)

Managerial career
- 2020–2022: Baník Ostrava B (goalkeeper coach)
- 2022–: Baník Ostrava (goalkeeper coach)
- * Club domestic league appearances and goals

Michal Daněk (born 6 July 1983) is a Czech former professional footballer who played as a goalkeeper. He works as youth goalkeeper coach of FC Baník Ostrava.

He notably played for Baník Ostrava, whom he has supported throughout his life. Daněk was a member of the squad of Baník Ostrava in the 2003–04 season, when Baník won the league title.

== Club career ==
In 2006, Daněk joined Viktoria Plzeň. In the 2006–07 Gambrinus liga, Daněk was one of four players in the league to play every minute of every match. Daněk claimed in August 2007 he was to meet Celtic for signing talks.

In January 2008 he linked up with West Bromwich Albion for a few days' training on trial. He then signed on loan for six months, with a view to a permanent deal. On 31 January 2008, Daněk signed for Albion on loan for the rest of the season. His loan was extended at the end of the season by six months until 1 January 2009. His loan was terminated on 29 August 2008 without having made a first-team appearance for Albion.

Daněk returned to Viktoria Plzeň afterwards. He won the Czech Cup with the club in 2010. In the same year, he moved to Baník Ostrava on loan.

== International career ==
He was called up to play internationally for the Czech Republic in March 2010, though he did not play in the match.

== Later career ==
In the summer 2020, Daněk returned to Baník Ostrava as a goalkeeper coach at the academy and assistant coach of the clubs B-team. In the fall 2022, he was promoted to the first team staff, remaining his role as goalkeeper coach.

== Honours ==
Viktoria Plzeň

- Czech Cup: 2010
