= 2007–08 Football League Championship =

Football League Championship
- Season: 2007–08
- Champions: West Bromwich Albion; 1st Championship title 3rd 2nd tier title
- Promoted: West Bromwich Albion; Stoke City; Hull City
- Relegated: Leicester City; Colchester United; Scunthorpe United
- Goals: 1,394
- Average goals/game: 2.53
- Top goalscorer: Sylvan Ebanks-Blake (23)
- Biggest home win: Ipswich Town 6–0 Bristol City (2007-11-10)
- Highest attendance: 36,208; Sheffield Wednesday v Norwich City
- Average attendance: 17,067

The 2007–08 Football League Championship (known as the Coca-Cola Championship for sponsorship reasons) was the sixteenth season under its current league division format and its fourth with its current sponsorship. The leagues started in August 2007 and concluded in May 2008, with the promotion play-off finals.

The Football League is contested through three Divisions. The top divisions of these is the League Championship. The winner and the runner up of the League Championship will be automatically promoted to the Premiership and they will be joined by the winner of the League Championship play-off. The bottom three teams in the Championship will be relegated to the second division, League One.

West Bromwich Albion finished top of the league with 81 points, closely followed by Stoke City who had 79 points. Hull City were promoted through the play-offs. Colchester and Scunthorpe United were both relegated several weeks before the end of the season. However, in a very tight league, with a gap of only 29 points between top and 22nd place, the final team to be relegated, Leicester City, went down on the final day while six other teams were within three points of them, despite the fact that only Crystal Palace had conceded less goals.

== Changes from last season ==
=== From Championship ===
Promoted to Premier League

- Derby County
- Birmingham City
- Sunderland

Relegated to League One

- Leeds United
- Luton Town
- Southend United

=== To Championship ===
Relegated from Premier League

- Charlton Athletic
- Sheffield United
- Watford

Promoted from League One

- Blackpool
- Bristol City
- Scunthorpe United

== Teams ==
=== Stadiums and locations ===
Team	Stadium	Capacity
Barnsley	Oakwell	23,009
Blackpool	Bloomfield Road	9,788
Bristol City	Ashton Gate	21,497
Burnley	Turf Moor	22,546
Cardiff City	Ninian Park	22,008
Charlton Athletic	The Valley	27,111
Colchester United	Layer Road	6,320
Coventry City	Ricoh Arena	32,609
Crystal Palace	Selhurst Park	26,309
Hull City	KC Stadium	25,586
Ipswich Town	Portman Road	30,311
Leicester City	Walkers Stadium	32,261
Norwich City	Carrow Road	26,034
Plymouth Argyle	Home Park	19,500
Preston North End	Deepdale	24,500
Queens Park Rangers	Loftus Road	19,128
Scunthorpe United	Glanford Park	9,088
Sheffield United	Bramall Lane	32,609
Sheffield Wednesday	Hillsborough	39,814
Southampton	St Mary's Stadium	32,689
Stoke City	Brittania Stadium	27,500
Watford	Vicarage Road	19,920
West Bromwich Albion	The Hawthorns	26,688
Wolverhampton Wanderers	Molineux	28,525

=== Personnel and sponsoring ===
Team	Manager	Kit maker	Sponsor
Barnsley	(Wales) Simon Davey	Surridge	Wake Smith Solicitors
Blackpool	(England) Simon Grayson	Carlotti	Floors 2 Go
Bristol City	(England) Gary Johnson	Puma	Bristol Trade Centre
Burnley	(Scotland) Owen Coyle	Erreà	Holland's Pies
Cardiff City	(England) Dave Jones	Joma	Communications Direct
Charlton Athletic	(England) Alan Pardew	Joma	Llanera
Colchester United	(Wales) Geraint Williams	Diadora	Haart Estate Agents (H)/Smart Energy (A)
Coventry City	(Wales) Chris Coleman	Puma	Cassidy Group
Crystal Palace	(England) Neil Warnock	Erreà	GAC Logistics
Hull City	(England) Phil Brown	Umbro	Karoo (H)/Kingston Communications (A)
Ipswich Town	(Northern Ireland) Jim Magilton	Mitre (H)/Punch (A & T)	E.ON
Leicester City	(England) Ian Holloway	Jako	Topps Tiles
Norwich City	(England) Glenn Roeder	Xara	Flybe
Plymouth Argyle	(Scotland) Paul Sturrock	Puma	Ginsters
Preston North End	(Scotland) Alan Irvine	Diadora	Enterprise plc
Queens Park Rangers	(Italy) Luigi De Canio	Le Coq Sportif	Cargiant
Scunthorpe United	(Northern Ireland) Nigel Adkins	Carlotti	Rainham Steel
Sheffield United	(England) Kevin Blackwell	Le Coq Sportif	Capital One
Sheffield Wednesday	(England) Brian Laws	Lotto	PlusNet
Southampton	(England) Nigel Pearson	Saints	Flybe
Stoke City	(Wales) Tony Pulis	Le Coq Sportif	Britannia Building Society
Watford	(England) Aidy Boothroyd	Diadora	Beko
West Bromwich Albion	(England) Tony Mowbray	Umbro	T-Mobile
Wolverhampton Wanderers	(Republic of Ireland) Mick McCarthy	Le Coq Sportif	Chaucer Consulting

== League table ==
Pos	Team	Pld	W	D	L	GF	GA	GD	Pts	Promotion, qualification or relegation
1	West Bromwich Albion (C, P)	46	23	12	11	88	55	+33	81	Promotion to the Premier League
2	Stoke City (P)	46	21	16	9	69	55	+14	79	Promotion to the Premier League
3	Hull City (O, P)	46	21	12	13	65	47	+18	75	Qualification for Championship play-offs
4	Bristol City	46	20	14	12	54	53	+1	74	Qualification for Championship play-offs
5	Crystal Palace	46	18	17	11	58	42	+16	71	Qualification for Championship play-offs
6	Watford	46	18	16	12	62	56	+6	70	Qualification for Championship play-offs
7	Wolverhampton Wanderers	46	18	16	12	53	48	+5	70	
8	Ipswich Town	46	18	15	13	65	56	+9	69	
9	Sheffield United	46	17	15	14	56	51	+5	66	
10	Plymouth Argyle	46	17	13	16	60	50	+10	64	
11	Charlton Athletic	46	17	13	16	63	58	+5	64	
12	Cardiff City	46	16	16	14	59	55	+4	64	
13	Burnley	46	16	14	16	60	67	−7	62	
14	Queens Park Rangers	46	14	16	16	60	66	−6	58	
15	Preston North End	46	15	11	20	50	56	−6	56	
16	Sheffield Wednesday	46	14	13	19	54	55	−1	55	
17	Norwich City	46	15	10	21	49	59	−10	55	
18	Barnsley	46	14	13	19	52	65	−13	55	
19	Blackpool	46	12	18	16	59	64	−5	54	
20	Southampton	46	13	15	18	56	72	−16	54	
21	Coventry City	46	14	11	21	52	64	−12	53	
22	Leicester City (R)	46	12	16	18	42	45	−3	52	Relegation to Football League One
23	Scunthorpe United (R)	46	11	13	22	46	69	−23	46	Relegation to Football League One
24	Colchester United (R)	46	7	17	22	62	86	−24	38	Relegation to Football League One

Updated to match(es) played on 4 May 2008. Source: The Football League
Rules for classification: 1) points; 2) goal difference; 3) number of goals scored.
(C) Champions; (O) Play-off winners; (P) Promoted; (R) Relegated

== Play-offs ==
The Football League Championship Playoffs took place at the end of May 2008. They involved the teams that finished third to sixth in the table. Hull (3rd) and Bristol City (4th) qualified from their semi-finals against Watford (6th) and Crystal Palace (5th) respectively over two legs. Hull City won the final with a single Dean Windass goal to win promotion to the Premier League.

Semifinals
3	Hull City	2	4	6
6	Watford	0	1	1
4	Bristol City	2	2	4
5	Crystal Palace	1	1	2

Final
3	Hull City	1
4	Bristol City	0

== Results ==
Home \ Away	BAR	BLP	BRI	BUR	CAR	CHA	COL	COV	CRY	HUL	IPS	LEI	NWC	PLY	PNE	QPR	SCU	SHU	SHW	SOU	STK	WAT	WBA	WOL
Barnsley		2–1	3–0	1–1	1–1	3–0	1–0	1–4	0–0	1–3	4–1	0–1	1–3	3–2	1–0	0–0	2–0	0–1	0–0	2–2	3–3	3–2	2–1	1–0
Blackpool	1–1		1–1	3–0	0–1	5–3	2–2	4–0	1–1	2–1	1–1	2–1	1–3	0–0	0–0	1–0	1–0	2–2	2–1	2–2	2–3	1–1	1–3	0–0
Bristol City	3–2	1–0		2–2	1–0	0–1	1–1	2–1	1–1	2–1	2–0	0–2	2–1	1–2	3–0	2–2	2–1	2–0	2–1	2–1	1–0	0–0	1–1	0–0
Burnley	2–1	2–2	0–1		3–3	1–0	1–1	2–0	1–1	0–1	2–2	1–1	2–1	1–0	2–3	0–2	2–0	1–2	1–1	2–3	0–0	2–2	2–1	1–3
Cardiff City	3–0	3–1	2–1	2–1		0–2	4–1	0–1	1–1	1–0	1–0	0–1	1–2	1–0	2–2	3–1	1–1	1–0	1–0	1–0	0–1	1–2	0–0	2–3
Charlton Athletic	1–1	4–1	1–1	1–3	3–0		1–2	4–1	2–0	1–1	3–1	2–0	2–0	1–2	1–2	0–1	1–1	0–3	3–2	1–1	1–0	2–2	1–1	2–3
Colchester United	2–2	0–2	1–2	2–3	1–1	2–2		1–5	1–2	1–3	2–0	1–1	1–1	1–1	2–1	4–2	0–1	2–2	1–2	1–1	0–1	2–3	3–2	0–1
Coventry City	4–0	3–1	0–3	1–2	0–0	1–1	1–0		0–2	1–1	2–1	2–0	1–0	3–1	2–1	0–0	1–1	0–1	0–0	1–1	1–2	0–3	0–4	1–1
Crystal Palace	2–0	0–0	2–0	5–0	0–0	0–1	2–1	1–1		1–1	0–1	2–2	1–1	2–1	2–1	1–1	2–0	3–2	2–1	1–1	1–3	0–2	1–1	0–2
Hull City	3–0	2–2	0–0	2–0	2–2	1–2	1–1	1–0	2–1		3–1	2–0	2–1	2–3	3–0	1–1	2–0	1–1	1–0	5–0	1–1	3–0	1–3	2–0
Ipswich Town	0–0	2–1	6–0	0–0	1–1	2–0	3–1	4–1	1–0	1–0		3–1	2–1	0–0	2–1	0–0	3–2	1–1	4–1	2–0	1–1	1–2	2–0	3–0
Leicester City	2–0	0–1	0–0	0–1	0–0	1–1	1–1	2–0	1–0	0–2	2–0		4–0	0–1	0–1	1–1	1–0	0–1	1–3	1–2	1–1	4–1	1–2	0–0
Norwich City	1–0	1–2	1–3	2–0	1–2	1–1	5–1	2–0	1–0	1–1	2–2	0–0		2–1	1–0	3–0	0–0	1–0	0–1	2–1	0–1	1–3	1–2	1–1
Plymouth Argyle	3–0	3–0	1–1	3–1	2–2	1–2	4–1	1–0	1–0	0–1	1–1	0–0	3–0		2–2	2–1	3–0	0–1	1–2	1–1	2–2	1–1	1–2	1–1
Preston North End	1–2	0–1	0–0	2–1	1–2	0–2	0–3	1–0	0–1	3–0	2–2	1–1	0–0	2–0		0–0	0–1	3–1	1–0	5–1	2–0	1–0	2–1	2–1
Queens Park Rangers	2–0	3–2	3–0	2–4	0–2	1–0	2–1	1–2	1–2	2–0	1–1	3–1	1–0	0–2	2–2		3–1	1–1	0–0	0–3	3–0	1–1	0–2	0–0
Scunthorpe United	2–2	1–1	0–1	2–0	3–2	1–0	3–3	2–1	0–0	1–2	1–2	0–0	0–1	1–0	2–1	2–2		3–2	1–1	1–1	2–3	1–3	2–3	0–2
Sheffield United	1–0	1–1	2–1	0–0	3–3	0–2	2–2	2–1	0–1	2–0	3–1	3–0	2–0	0–1	1–1	2–1	0–0		2–2	1–2	0–3	1–1	1–0	3–1
Sheffield Wednesday	1–0	2–1	0–1	0–2	1–0	0–0	1–2	1–1	2–2	1–0	1–2	0–2	4–1	1–1	2–1	2–1	1–2	2–0		5–0	1–1	0–1	0–1	1–3
Southampton	2–3	1–0	2–0	0–1	1–0	0–1	1–1	0–0	1–4	4–0	1–1	1–0	0–1	0–2	0–1	2–3	1–0	3–2	0–0		3–2	0–3	3–2	0–0
Stoke City	0–0	1–1	2–1	1–1	2–1	2–1	2–1	1–3	1–2	1–1	1–0	0–0	2–1	3–2	3–1	3–1	3–2	0–1	2–4	3–2		0–0	3–1	0–0
Watford	1–3	1–1	1–2	1–2	2–2	1–1	2–2	2–1	0–2	1–0	2–0	1–0	1–1	0–1	0–0	2–4	0–1	1–0	2–1	3–2	0–0		0–3	3–0
West Bromwich Albion	2–0	2–1	4–1	2–1	3–3	4–2	4–3	2–4	1–1	1–2	4–0	1–4	2–0	3–0	2–0	5–1	5–0	0–0	1–1	1–1	1–1	1–1		0–0
Wolverhampton Wanderers	1–0	2–1	1–1	2–3	3–0	2–0	1–0	1–0	0–3	0–1	1–1	1–1	2–0	1–0	1–0	3–3	2–1	0–0	2–1	2–2	2–4	1–2	0–1	

Source: The Football League
Legend: Blue = home team win; Yellow = draw; Red = away team win.

== Top scorers ==
Pos	Player	Team	Goals
1	(England) Sylvan Ebanks-Blake	Plymouth Argyle; Wolverhampton Wanderers	23
2	(England) James Beattie	Sheffield United	22
2	(England) Kevin Phillips	West Bromwich Albion	22
4	(Trinidad and Tobago) Stern John	Southampton	19
5	(Jamaica) Kevin Lisbie	Colchester United	17
6	(Republic of Ireland) Clinton Morrison	Crystal Palace	16
7	(England) Fraizer Campbell	Hull City	15
7	(Jamaica) Ricardo Fuller	Stoke City	15
9	(Republic of Ireland) Liam Lawrence	Stoke City	14

== Team of the Year ==
Pos.	Player	Club
GK	(Wales) Wayne Hennessey	Wolverhampton Wanderers
DF	(England) Bradley Orr	Bristol City
DF	(Nigeria) Danny Shittu	Watford
DF	(England) Paul Robinson	West Bromwich Albion
DF	(England) Ryan Shawcross	Stoke City
MF	(England) Brian Howard	Barnsley
MF	(Jamaica) Marvin Elliott	Bristol City
MF	(Republic of Ireland) Liam Lawrence	Stoke City
MF	(England) Jonathan Greening	West Bromwich Albion
ST	(Jamaica) Ricardo Fuller	Stoke City
ST	(England) Kevin Phillips	West Bromwich Albion

== Stadiums ==
Team	Stadium	Capacity
Sheffield Wednesday	Hillsborough Stadium	39,814
Southampton	St Mary's Stadium	32,689
Coventry City	Ricoh Arena	32,609
Sheffield United	Bramall Lane	32,609
Leicester City	Walkers Stadium	32,500
Ipswich Town	Portman Road	30,311
Wolverhampton Wanderers	Molineux Stadium	28,525
Stoke City	Britannia Stadium	28,383
West Brom	The Hawthorns	28,003
Charlton Athletic	The Valley	27,111
Crystal Palace	Selhurst Park	26,309
Norwich City	Carrow Road	26,034
Hull City	KC Stadium	25,404
Preston North End	Deepdale	24,500
Barnsley	Oakwell	23,009
Burnley	Turf Moor	22,546
Cardiff City	Ninian Park	22,008
Bristol City	Ashton Gate	21,497
Watford	Vicarage Road	19,920
Plymouth Argyle	Home Park	19,500
Queens Park Rangers	Loftus Road	19,128
Blackpool	Bloomfield Road	9,788
Scunthorpe United	Glanford Park	9,183
Colchester United	Layer Road	6,320

== Managerial changes ==
Team	Outgoing manager	Manner of departure	Date of vacancy	Replaced by	Date of appointment	Position in table
Sheffield United	(England) Neil Warnock	Resigned	16 May 2007	(England) Bryan Robson	16 May 2007	Pre-season
Crystal Palace	(England) Peter Taylor	Sacked	8 October 2007	(England) Neil Warnock	11 October 2007	19th
Leicester City	(England) Martin Allen	Mutual consent	29 August 2007	(England) Gary Megson	13 September 2007	9th
Queens Park Rangers	(England) John Gregory	Sacked	1 October 2007	(Italy) Luigi De Canio	29 October 2007	24th
Norwich City	(Scotland) Peter Grant	Mutual consent	8 October 2007	(England) Glenn Roeder	30 October 2007	22nd
Leicester City	(England) Gary Megson	Signed by Bolton Wanderers	24 October 2007	(England) Ian Holloway	22 November 2007	19th
Burnley	(England) Steve Cotterill	Mutual consent	8 November 2007	(Republic of Ireland) Owen Coyle	22 November 2007	15th
Preston North End	(England) Paul Simpson	Sacked	13 November 2007	(Scotland) Alan Irvine	20 November 2007	21st
Plymouth Argyle	(England) Ian Holloway	Signed by Leicester City	21 November 2007	(Scotland) Paul Sturrock	27 November 2007	7th
Coventry City	(Northern Ireland) Iain Dowie	Sacked	11 February 2008	(Wales) Chris Coleman	19 February 2008	19th
Sheffield United	(England) Bryan Robson	Mutual consent	14 February 2008	(England) Kevin Blackwell	14 February 2008	16th
Queens Park Rangers	(Italy) Luigi De Canio	Mutual consent	8 May 2008	(Northern Ireland) Iain Dowie	14 May 2008	14th

== Attendances ==
No.	Club	Average	Change	Highest	Lowest
1	Sheffield United	25,631	-16.0%	31,760	23,161
2	Norwich City	24,527	-0.1%	25,497	23,176
3	Leicester City	23,509	1.3%	31,892	19,264
4	Wolverhampton Wanderers	23,499	12.1%	27,883	20,763
5	Charlton Athletic	23,159	-11.6%	26,337	20,737
6	West Bromwich Albion	22,311	9.0%	27,493	18,310
7	Ipswich Town	21,935	-2.3%	29,656	17,938
8	Sheffield Wednesday	21,418	-9.4%	36,208	17,211
9	Southampton	21,254	-9.8%	31,957	17,741
10	Coventry City	19,123	-6.0%	27,992	14,036
11	Hull City	18,025	-3.9%	24,350	14,822
12	Watford	16,876	-10.0%	18,698	15,021
13	Stoke City	16,823	6.8%	26,609	11,147
14	Bristol City	16,276	27.0%	19,332	12,474
15	Crystal Palace	16,031	-8.6%	23,950	13,048
16	Queens Park Rangers	13,959	7.9%	18,309	10,514
17	Cardiff City	13,939	-8.4%	18,840	11,006
18	Plymouth Argyle	13,000	-0.1%	17,511	10,451
19	Preston North End	12,647	-12.4%	17,807	10,279
20	Burnley	12,365	3.4%	16,843	9,779
21	Barnsley	11,425	-10.3%	18,257	8,531
22	Blackpool	8,861	28.9%	9,640	7,214
23	Scunthorpe United	6,434	13.5%	8,801	4,407
24	Colchester United	5,509	0.8%	6,300	4,450
