= 2010–11 West Bromwich Albion F.C. season =

West Bromwich Albion
2010–11 season
- Chairman: Jeremy Peace
- Manager: Roberto Di Matteo (until 6 February); Michael Appleton (caretaker from 6–11 February); Roy Hodgson (from 11 February)
- Stadium: The Hawthorns
- Premier League: 11th
- FA Cup: Third round
- League Cup: Fifth round
- Top goalscorer: League: Peter Odemwingie (15); All: Peter Odemwingie (15)
- Average home league attendance: 24,683
| Home colours | Away colours | Third colours |

The 2010–11 season was West Bromwich Albion's fifth season in the Premier League. Albion return to the Premier League after being promoted from the Championship. West Brom confirmed their promotion back to the Premier League on 10 April 2010 after a 3–2 win over Doncaster Rovers, and retained their new top-flight status, finishing 11th.

== Background ==
During the off-season, West Bromwich Albion made a number of improvements to their home ground, The Hawthorns. The club reseeded the playing surface and repainted the exterior of the stadium. The memorial garden, situated behind the East Stand car park, was extended, while additional lighting, new flooring and more turnstiles were added to the Smethwick End.

== Players ==
=== First team squad ===
Note: Flags indicate national team as defined under FIFA eligibility rules; some limited exceptions apply. Players may hold more than one non-FIFA nationality.

| No. | Pos. | Nation | Player |
|---|---|---|---|
| 1 | GK | ENG | Scott Carson |
| 3 | DF | SWE | Jonas Olsson (vice-captain) |
| 4 | DF | SVK | Marek Čech |
| 5 | MF | CMR | Somen Tchoyi |
| 6 | DF | ESP | Pablo |
| 7 | MF | SCO | James Morrison (Note: Morrison was born in Darlington, England, and represented them at U-17, U-18, U-19, and U-21 level, but also qualified to represent Scotland internationally through his grandparents and made his international debut for Scotland in May 2008.) |
| 8 | MF | ENG | Giles Barnes (Note: Barnes was born in Barking and Dagenham, England, and represented them at U-19 level, but also qualified to represent Jamaica internationally through his grandparents, declared for them internationally in 2014, and would make his international debut for Jamaica in May 2015.) |
| 10 | FW | ENG | Ishmael Miller |
| 11 | MF | NIR | Chris Brunt (club captain) |
| 12 | MF | IRL | Steven Reid (Note: Reid was born in Kingston upon Thames, England, and represented them at U-16 level, but also qualified to represent the Republic of Ireland internationally through his grandfather and made his international debut for the Republic of Ireland in 2001.) |
| 13 | GK | WAL | Boaz Myhill (Note: Myhill was born in Modesto, California, United States, but was raised in England from the age of 1, qualifying to represent any of the home nations. He represented England at U-17, U-18, and U-20 level before making his international debut for Wales in March 2008.) |
| 14 | MF | ENG | Jerome Thomas |
| 17 | MF | SCO | Graham Dorrans |
| 18 | FW | MEX | Carlos Vela (on loan from Arsenal) |
| 20 | DF | ENG | Nicky Shorey |
| 21 | MF | COD | Youssouf Mulumbu (Note: Mulumbu was born in Kinshasa, Zaire (now Democratic Republic of the Congo), but also qualified to represent France internationally and represented them at U-20 and U-21 level before making his international debut for the Democratic Republic of the Congo in March 2008.) |
| 22 | DF | NED | Gianni Zuiverloon |

| No. | Pos. | Nation | Player |
|---|---|---|---|
| 23 | DF | CIV | Abdoulaye Méïté (Note: Méïté was born in Colombes, France, but also qualified to represent the Ivory Coast internationally and made his international debut for the Ivory Coast in 2003.) |
| 24 | FW | NGA | Peter Odemwingie (Note: Odemwingie was born in Tashkent, Uzbek SRR, Soviet Union (now Uzbekistan), but also qualified to represent Nigeria internationally through his father and made his international debut for Nigeria in May 2002.) |
| 26 | DF | ENG | James Hurst |
| 27 | MF | ENG | Sam Mantom |
| 28 | FW | GUF | Marc-Antoine Fortuné |
| 29 | MF | ENG | George Thorne |
| 30 | DF | ROU | Gabriel Tamaș |
| 31 | FW | IRL | Simon Cox (Note: Cox was born in Tilehurst, England, but also qualified to represent the Republic of Ireland internationally through his grandfather and made his international debut for the Republic of Ireland in May 2011.) |
| 32 | FW | ENG | Lateef Elford-Alliyu (Note: Elford-Alliyu was born in Ibadan, Nigeria, but also qualified to represent England internationally and represented them at U-17 level.) |
| 33 | MF | AUT | Paul Scharner |
| 34 | DF | ENG | Paul Downing |
| 35 | MF | ENG | Romaine Sawyers (Note: Sawyers was born in Birmingham, England, but also qualified to represent Saint Kitts and Nevis internationally and represented them at U-23 level before making his international debut for Saint Kitts and Nevis in October 2012.) |
| 36 | MF | CHI | Gonzalo Jara |
| 37 | FW | WAL | Kayleden Brown (Note: Brown was born in Birmingham, England, but also qualified to represent Wales internationally and represented them at U-17 and U-19 level.) |
| 38 | FW | ENG | Saido Berahino (Note: Berahino was born in Bujumbura, Burundi, but was raised in England from the age of 10 and represented them at every youth level between U-16 and U-21 level before making his international debut for Burundi in September 2018.) |
| 39 | GK | ENG | Ryan Allsop |
| 40 | GK | IRL | Dean Kiely (Note: Kiely was born in Salford, England, and represented them at U-15, U-16, and U-18 level, but also qualified to represent the Republic of Ireland internationally and made his international debut for the Republic of Ireland in November 1999.) |

=== Left club during season ===
Note: Flags indicate national team as defined under FIFA eligibility rules; some limited exceptions apply. Players may hold more than one non-FIFA nationality.

| No. | Pos. | Nation | Player |
|---|---|---|---|
| 2 | DF | ENG | Joe Mattock (on loan to Sheffield United) |
| 9 | FW | CZE | Roman Bednář (on loan to Leicester City and MKE Ankaragücü) |
| 15 | FW | NZL | Chris Wood (on loan to Barnsley and Brighton & Hove Albion) |
| 16 | FW | ENG | Luke Moore (to Swansea City) |

| No. | Pos. | Nation | Player |
|---|---|---|---|
| 18 | FW | ENG | Reuben Reid (to Oldham Athletic) |
| 19 | GK | ENG | Luke Daniels (on loan to Bristol Rovers) |
| 25 | DF | ENG | Leon Barnett (to Norwich City) |

== Player statistics ==
As of 22 May 2011

| No. | Pos | Nat | Player | Total | | Premier League | | FA Cup | | League Cup | |
| No. | Pos | Nat | Player | Apps | Goals | Apps | Goals | Apps | Goals | Apps | Goals |
|---|---|---|---|---|---|---|---|---|---|---|---|
| 1 | GK | (England) ENG | Scott Carson | 32 | 0 | 32 | 0 | 0 | 0 | 0 | 0 |
| 2 | DF | (England) ENG | Joe Mattock | 0 | 0 | 0 | 0 | 0 | 0 | 0 | 0 |
| 3 | DF | (Sweden) SWE | Jonas Olsson | 24 | 1 | 24 | 1 | 0 | 0 | 0 | 0 |
| 4 | MF | (Slovakia) SVK | Marek Čech | 17 | 0 | 14+1 | 0 | 0 | 0 | 2 | 0 |
| 5 | MF | (Cameroon) CMR | Somen Tchoyi | 25 | 7 | 7+16 | 6 | 0 | 0 | 2 | 1 |
| 6 | DF | (Spain) ESP | Pablo | 13 | 2 | 8+2 | 1 | 0 | 0 | 3 | 1 |
| 7 | MF | (Scotland) SCO | James Morrison | 31 | 4 | 26+5 | 4 | 0 | 0 | 0 | 0 |
| 8 | MF | (England) ENG | Giles Barnes | 17 | 0 | 1+13 | 0 | 0 | 0 | 3 | 0 |
| 9 | FW | (Czech Republic) CZE | Roman Bednář | 7 | 0 | 1+3 | 0 | 0 | 0 | 3 | 0 |
| 10 | FW | (England) ENG | Ishmael Miller | 7 | 0 | 0+6 | 0 | 0 | 0 | 1 | 0 |
| 11 | MF | (Northern Ireland) NIR | Chris Brunt | 38 | 4 | 34 | 4 | 4 | 0 | 0 | 0 |
| 12 | MF | (Republic of Ireland) IRL | Steven Reid | 26 | 2 | 13+10 | 1 | 0 | 0 | 3 | 1 |
| 13 | GK | (Wales) WAL | Boaz Myhill | 9 | 0 | 6 | 0 | 0 | 0 | 3 | 0 |
| 14 | MF | (England) ENG | Jerome Thomas | 33 | 3 | 32+1 | 3 | 0 | 0 | 0 | 0 |
| 15 | FW | (New Zealand) NZL | Chris Wood | 2 | 1 | 0+1 | 0 | 0 | 0 | 1 | 1 |
| 16 | FW | (England) ENG | Luke Moore | 1 | 0 | 0 | 0 | 0 | 0 | 1 | 0 |
| 17 | MF | (Scotland) SCO | Graham Dorrans | 23 | 1 | 16+5 | 1 | 0 | 0 | 2 | 0 |
| 18 | FW | (Mexico) MEX | Carlos Vela | 8 | 2 | 3+5 | 2 | 0 | 0 | 0 | 0 |
| 19 | GK | (England) ENG | Luke Daniels | 0 | 0 | 0 | 0 | 0 | 0 | 0 | 0 |
| 20 | DF | (England) ENG | Nicky Shorey | 31 | 0 | 25+3 | 0 | 0 | 0 | 3 | 0 |
| 21 | MF | (Democratic Republic of the Congo) COD | Youssouf Mulumbu | 34 | 6 | 34 | 6 | 0 | 0 | 0 | 0 |
| 22 | DF | (Netherlands) NED | Gianni Zuiverloon | 5 | 1 | 1+1 | 0 | 0 | 0 | 3 | 1 |
| 23 | DF | (Ivory Coast) CIV | Abdoulaye Méïté | 12 | 0 | 10 | 0 | 0 | 0 | 2 | 0 |
| 24 | FW | (Nigeria) NGA | Peter Odemwingie | 32 | 15 | 29+3 | 15 | 0 | 0 | 0 | 0 |
| 25 | DF | (England) ENG | Leon Barnett | 1 | 0 | 0 | 0 | 0 | 0 | 1 | 0 |
| 27 | FW | (England) ENG | Sam Mantom | 1 | 0 | 0 | 0 | 0 | 0 | 1 | 0 |
| 28 | FW | (France) FRA | Marc-Antoine Fortuné | 26 | 2 | 14+11 | 2 | 0 | 0 | 1 | 0 |
| 29 | FW | (England) ENG | George Thorne | 1 | 0 | 0+1 | 0 | 0 | 0 | 0 | 0 |
| 30 | DF | (Romania) ROU | Gabriel Tamaș | 26 | 0 | 22+4 | 0 | 0 | 0 | 0 | 0 |
| 31 | FW | (Republic of Ireland) IRL | Simon Cox | 22 | 4 | 8+11 | 1 | 0 | 0 | 3 | 3 |
| 32 | MF | (England) ENG | Lateef Elford-Alliyu | 0 | 0 | 0 | 0 | 0 | 0 | 0 | 0 |
| 33 | MF | (Austria) AUT | Paul Scharner | 33 | 4 | 33 | 4 | 0 | 0 | 0 | 0 |
| 34 | DF | (England) ENG | Paul Downing | 0 | 0 | 0 | 0 | 0 | 0 | 0 | 0 |
| 35 | MF | (Saint Kitts and Nevis) SKN | Romaine Sawyers | 0 | 0 | 0 | 0 | 0 | 0 | 0 | 0 |
| 36 | MF | (Chile) CHI | Gonzalo Jara | 31 | 1 | 24+5 | 1 | 0 | 0 | 2 | 0 |
| 37 | MF | (Wales) WAL | Kayleden Brown | 0 | 0 | 0 | 0 | 0 | 0 | 0 | 0 |
| 40 | GK | (Republic of Ireland) IRL | Dean Kiely | 0 | 0 | 0 | 0 | 0 | 0 | 0 | 0 |
| | DF | (England) ENG | James Hurst | 0 | 0 | 0 | 0 | 0 | 0 | 0 | 0 |

- * Player left club during the season.

== Transfers ==
=== Summer transfers in ===
| Date | # | Player | Club | Fee |
|---|---|---|---|---|
| 19 May 2010 | 30 | (Romania) Gabriel Tamaș | (France) Auxerre | £800,000 |
| 26 May 2010 | 12 | (Republic of Ireland) Steven Reid | (England) Blackburn Rovers | Free |
| 2 June 2010 | 6 | (Spain) Pablo | (Spain) Atlético Madrid | Free |
| 30 July 2010 | 13 | (Wales) Boaz Myhill | (England) Hull City | £1,500,000 |
| 9 August 2010 | 20 | (England) Nicky Shorey | (England) Aston Villa | £1,000,000 |
| 20 August 2010 | 24 | (Nigeria) Peter Odemwingie | (Russia) Lokomotiv Moscow | Undisclosed |
| 20 August 2010 | 18 | (Cameroon) Somen Tchoyi | (Austria) Red Bull Salzburg | Undisclosed |
| 27 August 2010 | 28 | (France) Marc-Antoine Fortuné | (Scotland) Celtic | Undisclosed |
| 30 August 2010 | 33 | (Austria) Paul Scharner | (England) Wigan Athletic | Undisclosed |
| 31 August 2010 | - | (England) Craig Dawson | (England) Rochdale | Undisclosed |
| 31 August 2010 | 26 | (England) James Hurst | (England) Portsmouth | Free |

=== Summer transfers out ===
| Date | # | Player | Club | Fee |
|---|---|---|---|---|
| | 29 | (Netherlands) Andwélé Slory | (Bulgaria) Levski Sofia | Free |
| | 7 | (Slovenia) Robert Koren | (England) Hull City | Free |
| | 25 | (England) Joss Labadie | (England) Tranmere Rovers | Free |
| | 20 | (Portugal) Filipe Teixeira | (Ukraine) Metalurh Donetsk | Free |
| 1 July 2010 | 8 | (England) Jonathan Greening | (England) Fulham | ~ £4,000,000 |

=== Loan in ===
| # | Player | Club | Arrival date | Return date |
|---|---|---|---|---|
| 18 | (Mexico) Carlos Vela | (England) Arsenal | 28 January 2011 | End of Season |

=== Loan out ===
| # | Player | Club | Arrival date | Return date |
|---|---|---|---|---|
| 28 | (Spain) Borja Valero | (Spain) Villarreal | 19 July 2010 | End of season |
| 40 | (Canada) Marcus Haber | (Scotland) St Johnstone | 30 July 2010 | End of season |
| - | (England) Kayleden Brown | (England) Tranmere Rovers | 12 August 2010 | 9 September 2010 |
| 18 | (England) Reuben Reid | (England) Walsall | 19 August 2010 | 19 January 2011 |
| 25 | (England) Leon Barnett | (England) Norwich City | 26 August 2010 | 26 January 2011 |
| - | (England) Craig Dawson | (England) Rochdale | 31 August 2010 | End of season |
| 15 | (New Zealand) Chris Wood | (England) Barnsley | 23 September 2010 | 23 December 2010 |
| 35 | (Saint Kitts and Nevis) Romaine Sawyers | (England) Port Vale | 21 January 2011 | 18 February 2011 |
| 37 | (England) Kayleden Brown | (England) Port Vale | 21 January 2011 | 18 February 2011 |
| 10 | (England) Ishmael Miller | (England) Queens Park Rangers | 22 January 2011 | 24 April 2011 |

== Results ==
=== Pre-season ===
| 10 July 2010 | Kidderminster Harriers (England) | 0–3 | West Bromwich Albion | Kidderminster |
| 12:30 | | report | Miller 11'; Bednář 68'; Méïté 73' | Stadium: Aggborough; Attendance: 1,950 (Albion fans 1,130); Referee: A. Penn |

| 17 July 2010 | VVV-Venlo (Netherlands) | 1–2 | West Bromwich Albion | Venlo |
| 16:00 | Boymans 60'; De Regt (red card) 81' | report | Miller 25'; Tamaș 61' | Stadium: De Koel; Attendance: - Referee: - |

| 20 July 2010 | Crewe Alexandra (England) | 1–0 | West Bromwich Albion XI | Crewe |
| 19:30 | Murphy 59' | report | | Stadium: Alexandra Stadium; Attendance: - Referee: - |

| 24 July 2010 | Bristol Rovers (England) | 0–1 | West Bromwich Albion | Bristol |
| 15:00 | | report | Dorrans 50' | Stadium: Memorial Stadium; Attendance: 2,359 (299 Albion fans); Referee: Iain Williamson |

| 27 July 2010 | Doncaster Rovers (England) | 1–0 | West Bromwich Albion | Doncaster |
| 19:45 | Sheils 60' | report | | Stadium: Keepmoat Stadium; Attendance: 3,055 (190 Albion fans); Referee: C Pawson |

| 31 July 2010 | Coventry City (England) | 1–1 | West Bromwich Albion | Coventry |
| 15:00 | McSheffrey 15' | report | Miller 74' | Stadium: Ricoh Arena; Attendance: - Referee: K Friend |

| 3 August 2010 | Rushden & Diamonds (England) | 2–1 | West Bromwich Albion XI | Irthlingborough |
| 19:30 | Tomlin 55', 74' | report | Reid 53' | Stadium: Nene Park; Attendance: 535; Referee: - |

| 7 August 2010 | West Bromwich Albion | 1–1 | (Spain) Osasuna | West Bromwich |
| 15:00 | Morrison 15' | report | Oier 85' (pen.) | Stadium: The Hawthorns; Attendance: - Referee: - |

=== Premier League ===
| Matchday | 1 | 2 | 3 | 4 | 5 | 6 | 7 | 8 | 9 | 10 | 11 | 12 | 13 | 14 | 15 | 16 | 17 | 18 | 19 | 20 | 21 | 22 | 23 | 24 | 25 | 26 | 27 | 28 | 29 | 30 | 31 | 32 | 33 | 34 | 35 | 36 | 37 | 38 |
|---|---|---|---|---|---|---|---|---|---|---|---|---|---|---|---|---|---|---|---|---|---|---|---|---|---|---|---|---|---|---|---|---|---|---|---|---|---|---|
| Ground | A | H | A | H | H | A | H | A | H | A | H | A | A | H | A | H | A | A | H | H | A | H | A | H | A | H | H | A | A | H | H | A | H | A | H | A | H | A |
| Result | L | W | L | D | W | W | D | D | W | L | L | D | L | L | W | W | L | L | L | L | L | W | L | D | L | D | D | D | W | D | W | W | L | D | W | L | W | D |
| Position | 20 | 13 | 16 | 16 | 10 | 6 | 6 | 6 | 6 | 6 | 10 | 11 | 12 | 16 | 12 | 9 | 10 | 12 | 14 | 15 | 16 | 14 | 16 | 16 | 17 | 17 | 17 | 17 | 16 | 16 | 13 | 10 | 11 | 12 | 11 | 13 | 11 | 11 |

Source: WorldFootball.com
A = Away; H = Home; W = Win; D = Draw; L = Loss

| 14 August 2010 | Chelsea | 6–0 | West Bromwich Albion | London |
| 17:30 | Malouda 6', 90'; Drogba 45+1', 55', 68'; Ferreira (yellow card) 56'; Lampard 63' | report | | Stadium: Stamford Bridge; Attendance: 41,589 (1,500 away); Referee: M Clattenburg |

| 21 August 2010 | West Bromwich Albion | 1–0 | Sunderland | West Bromwich |
| 15:00 | Odemwingie 81' | report | | Stadium: The Hawthorns; Attendance: 23,624 (2,589 away); Referee: K Friend |

| 28 August 2010 | Liverpool | 1–0 | West Bromwich Albion | Liverpool |
| 15:00 | Torres 65' | report | | Stadium: Anfield; Attendance: 41,194 (1,700 away); Referee: Probert |

| 11 September 2010 | West Bromwich Albion | 1–1 | Tottenham Hotspur | West Bromwich |
| 15:00 | Brunt 41' | report | Modrić 27' | Stadium: The Hawthorns; Attendance: 23,642 (2,599 away); Referee: Webb |

| 18 September 2010 | West Bromwich Albion | 3–1 | Birmingham City | West Bromwich |
| 15:00 | Dann 51' (o.g.); Odemwingie 59'; Olsson 69' | report | Jerome 15' | Stadium: The Hawthorns; Attendance: 23,062 (2,600 away); Referee: C Foy |

| 25 September 2010 | Arsenal | 2–3 | West Bromwich Albion | North London |
| 15:00 | Nasri 78', 90+1' | report | Odemwingie 50'; Jara 52'; Thomas 73' | Stadium: Emirates Stadium; Attendance: 60,025 (2,000 away); Referee: Oliver |

| 2 October 2010 | West Bromwich Albion | 1–1 | Bolton Wanderers | West Bromwich |
| 15:00 | Morrison 78' | report | Elmander 64' | Stadium: The Hawthorns; Attendance: 22,846; Referee: P Walton |

| 16 October 2010 | Manchester United | 2–2 | West Bromwich Albion | Manchester |
| 15:00 | Hernández 5'; Nani 25' | report | Evra 50' (o.g.); Tchoyi 55' | Stadium: Old Trafford; Attendance: 75,272 (2,500 away); Referee: Jones |

| 23 October 2010 | West Bromwich Albion | 2–1 | Fulham | West Bromwich |
| 15:00 | Mulumbu 17'; Fortuné 40' | report | Carson 9' (o.g.) | Stadium: The Hawthorns; Attendance: 25,625; Referee: K Friend |

| 1 November 2010 | Blackpool | 2–1 | West Bromwich Albion | Blackpool |
| 15:00 | Adam 12' (pen.); Varney 63' | | Mulumbu 84'; Pablo Ibáñez (red card) 12'; Jara (red card) 29' | Stadium: Bloomfield Road; Attendance: 15,210 (1,988 away); Referee: Oliver |

| 7 November 2010 | West Bromwich Albion | 0–2 | Manchester City | West Bromwich |
| 15:00 | Mulumbu (red card) 12' | report | Balotelli 20', 26', (red card) 62' | Stadium: The Hawthorns; Attendance: 23,013; Referee: - |

| 9 November 2010 | West Ham | 2–2 | West Bromwich Albion | West Ham |
| 19:45 | Parker 43'; Piquionne 50' (pen.) | report | Odemwingie 38' (pen.); Pablo 71' | Stadium: Upton Park; Attendance: 33,023 (1,763 away); Referee: Mike Dean |

| 13 November 2010 | Wigan Athletic | 1–0 | West Bromwich Albion | Wigan |
| 15:00 | Moses 70' | report | | Stadium: DW Stadium; Attendance: 16,085; Referee: Anthony Taylor |

| 20 November 2010 | West Bromwich Albion | 0–3 | Stoke City | West Bromwich |
| 15:00 | | Report bbc.co.uk | Etherington 55' (pen.); Walters 85' (pen.), 90+3' | Stadium: The Hawthorns; Attendance: 24,164 (2,598 away); Referee: Chris Foy |

| 27 November 2010 | Everton | 1–4 | West Bromwich Albion | Liverpool |
| 15:00 | Cahill 42' | report | Scharner 16'; Brunt 26'; Tchoyi 76'; Distin 87' (o.g.) | Stadium: Goodison Park; Attendance: 35,237; Referee: Lee Mason |

| 4 December 2010 | West Bromwich Albion | 3–1 | Newcastle United | West Bromwich |
| 15:00 | Tchoyi 32'; Odemwingie 71', 89' | | Løvenkrands 60' | Stadium: The Hawthorns; Attendance: 23,486 (2,593 away); Referee: Mike Dean |

| 11 December 2010 | Aston Villa | 2–1 | West Bromwich Albion | Birmingham |
| 15:00 | Downing 25'; Heskey 80' | | Scharner 89' | Stadium: Villa Park; Attendance: 37,015 (2,800 away); Referee: Halsey |

| 26 December 2010 | Bolton Wanderers | 2–0 | West Bromwich Albion | Bolton |
| 15:00 | Taylor 40'; Elmander 86' | | | Stadium: Reebok Stadium; Attendance: 23,413; Referee: Webb |

| 28 December 2010 | West Bromwich Albion | 1–3 | Blackburn Rovers | West Bromwich |
| 15:00 | Thomas 16' | | Kalinić 2', 52'; Diouf 61' | Stadium: The Hawthorns; Attendance: 24,440; Referee: - |

| 1 January 2011 | West Bromwich Albion | 1–2 | Manchester United | West Bromwich |
| 15:00 | Morrison 13' | | Rooney 2'; Hernández 75' | Stadium: The Hawthorns; Attendance: 25,499 (2,600 away); Referee: - |

| 4 January 2011 | Fulham | 3–0 | West Bromwich Albion | Fulham |
| 19:45 | Davies 45'; Dempsey 55'; Hangeland 64' | | | Stadium: Craven Cottage; Attendance: 23,654 (1,525 away); Referee: - |

| 15 January 2011 | West Bromwich Albion | 3–2 | Blackpool | West Bromwich |
| 15:00 | Odemwingie 37', 87'; Morrison 52' | report | Vaughan 11'; Taylor-Fletcher 80' | Stadium: The Hawthorns; Attendance: 25,316 (1,600 away); Referee: S. Attwell |

| 22 January 2011 | Blackburn Rovers | 2–0 | West Bromwich Albion | Blackburn |
| 15:00 | Tamaș 40' (o.g.); Hoilett 46' | | | Stadium: Ewood Park; Attendance: - Referee: - |

| 1 February 2011 | West Bromwich Albion | 2–2 | Wigan Athletic | West Bromwich |
| 19:45 | Odemwingie 5'; Fortuné 79' | | N'Zogbia 20'; Watson 43' | Stadium: The Hawthorns; Attendance: 25,358 (496 away); Referee: Dowd |

| 5 February 2011 | Manchester City | 3–0 | West Bromwich Albion | Manchester |
| 15:00 | Tevez 17' (pen.), 22', 39' (pen.) | (Report) | | Stadium: City of Manchester Stadium; Attendance: 46,846 (2,800 away); Referee: Atkinson |

| 12 February 2011 | West Bromwich Albion | 3–3 | West Ham | West Bromwich |
| 15:00 | Dorrans 3'; Thomas 8'; Reid 32' (o.g.) | (Report) | Ba 50', 83'; Cole 58' | Stadium: The Hawthorns; Attendance: 23,916 (2,600 away); Referee: Mason |

| 20 February 2011 | West Bromwich Albion | 1–1 | Wolverhampton Wanderers | West Bromwich |
| 12:00 | Vela 90' | (Report) | O'Hara 39' | Stadium: The Hawthorns; Attendance: 26,170 (2,700 away); Referee: Dean |

| 28 February 2011 | Stoke City | 1–1 | West Bromwich Albion | Stoke |
| 20:00 | Delap 53' | (Report) | Vela 87' | Stadium: Britannia Stadium; Attendance: 25,019 (1,789 away); Referee: Oliver |

| 5 March 2011 | Birmingham City | 1–3 | West Bromwich Albion | Birmingham |
| 15:00 | Beausejour 48' | (Report) | Mulumbu 47'; Morrison 58'; Scharner 72' | Stadium: St Andrew's; Attendance: 27,013 (3,300 away); Referee: Jones |

| 19 March 2011 | West Bromwich Albion | 2–2 | Arsenal | West Bromwich |
| 15:00 | Reid 3'; Odemwingie 58' | (Report) | Arshavin 70'; Van Persie 78' | Stadium: The Hawthorns; Attendance: 25,729 (2,600 away); Referee: S. Attwell |

| 2 April 2011 | West Bromwich Albion | 2–1 | Liverpool | West Bromwich |
| 15:00 | Brunt 62' (pen.), 88' (pen.) | (Report) | Škrtel 50' | Stadium: The Hawthorns; Attendance: 26,196 (2,600 away); Referee: Atkinson |

| 9 April 2011 | Sunderland | 2–3 | West Bromwich Albion | Sunderland |
| 15:00 | Shorey 10' (o.g.); Bardsley 31' | (Report) | Odemwingie 28'; Scharner 54'; Mulumbu 72' | Stadium: Stadium of Light; Attendance: 41,586 (3,012 away); Referee: Walton |

| 16 April 2011 | West Bromwich Albion | 1–3 | Chelsea | West Bromwich |
| 15:00 | Odemwingie 17' | (report) | Drogba 22'; Kalou 26'; Lampard 45' | Stadium: The Hawthorns; Attendance: 25,163 (2,600 away); Referee: Probert |

| 23 April 2011 | Tottenham Hotspur | 2–2 | West Bromwich Albion | North London |
| 15:00 | Pavlyuchenko 27'; Defoe 66' | (report) | Odemwingie 5'; Cox 81' | Stadium: White Hart Lane; Attendance: 36,160 (1,700 away); Referee: S Attwell |

| 30 April 2011 | West Bromwich Albion | 2–1 | Aston Villa | West Bromwich |
| 15:00 | Odemwingie 60'; Scharner (red card) 62'; Mulumbu 84' | (report) | Méïté 5' (o.g.) | Stadium: The Hawthorns; Attendance: 25,889 (2,600 away); Referee: P. Dowd |

| 7 May 2011 | Wolverhampton Wanderers | 3–1 | West Bromwich Albion | Wolverhampton |
| 15:00 | Fletcher 15', 47'; Guedioura 28' | (report) | Odemwingie 55' (pen.) | Stadium: Molineux; Attendance: 28,510 (2,541 away); Referee: M. Dean |

| 14 May 2011 | West Bromwich Albion | 1–0 | Everton | West Bromwich |
| 15:00 | Mulumbu 10' | (report) | | Stadium: The Hawthorns; Attendance: 25,838 (2,599 away fans); Referee: Taylor |

| 22 May 2011 | Newcastle United | 3–3 | West Bromwich Albion | Newcastle upon Tyne |
| 16:00 | S. Taylor 16'; Lovenkrands 39'; Olsson 47' (o.g.) | (report) | Tchoyi 62', 71', 90' | Stadium: St. James' Park; Attendance: 51,678 (2,750 away); Referee: Halsey |

=== League Cup ===
| 2nd Round | Leyton Orient | 0–2 | West Bromwich Albion | Leyton |
| 24 August 2010; 19:45 | | report | Pablo 29'; Wood 90' | Stadium: Brisbane Road; Attendance: 2,349 (749 away); Referee: D Whitestone |

| 3rd Round | West Bromwich Albion | 2–1 | Manchester City | West Bromwich |
| 22 September 2010; 20:00 | Zuiverloon 55'; Cox 57' | report | Jô 19' | Stadium: The Hawthorns; Attendance: 10,418 (1,642 away); Referee: Swarbrick |

| 4th Round | Leicester City | 1–4 | West Bromwich Albion | Leicester |
| 27 October 2010; 19:45 | Shorey 53' (o.g.) | report | Cox 21', 90'; Tchoyi 62'; Reid 79' | Stadium: Walkers Stadium; Attendance: 16,957 (5,000 away); Referee: Taylor |

| 5th Round | Ipswich Town | 1–0 | West Bromwich Albion | Ipswich |
| 30 November 2010; 19:45 | Leadbitter 69' | | | Stadium: Portman Road; Attendance: 11,363; Referee: Mike Jones |

=== FA Cup ===
| 3rd Round | Reading | 1–0 | West Bromwich Albion | Reading |
| 8 January 2011; 15:00 | Long 41' | | Olsson (red card) 60' | Stadium: Madejski Stadium; Attendance: 13,005 (3,188 away); Referee: Jon Moss |

== See also ==
- West Bromwich Albion F.C. seasons
- 2010–11 Premier League
