= 2009–10 West Bromwich Albion F.C. season =

West Bromwich Albion
2009–10 season
- Chairman: Jeremy Peace
- Manager: Roberto Di Matteo
- Stadium: The Hawthorns
- Championship: 2nd (promoted)
- FA Cup: Fifth round
- League Cup: Third round
- Top goalscorer: League: Chris Brunt (13); All: Graham Dorrans (17)
- Highest home attendance: 25,297 (vs. Barnsley)
- Lowest home attendance: 10,659 (vs. Rotherham United, 26 August)
Home colours	Away colours

The 2009–10 season was West Bromwich Albion's 107th season in the Football League. West Bromwich returned to the Championship after being relegated from the Premier League.

== Background ==
West Bromwich continued with English company Umbro as the shirt designers. For the second season running, West Bromwich were unable to find a kit sponsor.

On 16 June 2009, Tony Mowbray left West Bromwich Albion to join Scottish club Celtic as their new manager. He was replaced two weeks later by former Chelsea player Roberto Di Matteo, with the job title changed to head coach.

As part of ongoing ground refurbishments at The Hawthorns, Albion replaced all of the seating in both the Birmingham Road End and Smethwick End with navy blue seats, matching those already fitted in the East and West Stands. The stadium's "iconic" large-scale seat patterns, dating back to the mid-1990s—an italic "Albion" at the Smethwick End and "WBAFC" below a blue and white scarf at the Birmingham Road End—were removed as a result of the work.

== Football League Championship ==
West Bromwich began their season with a 1–1 draw against Newcastle United. They then travelled to City Ground to play Nottingham Forest, whom they beat, followed by another away win. West Bromwich's second home game was against Ipswich Town, whom they defeated 2–0. This was followed by a draw at Sheffield United. They then came back from against Plymouth Argyle, then beat Doncaster Rovers. West Bromwich then won one of their most remarkable games in a 5–0 win over Middlesbrough, before losing their next two games to Crystal Palace and Barnsley.

The first game of October saw West Brom draw against Preston North End. This was followed by a 3–1 win over Reading. Former Baggie Craig Beattie scored the only goal in a 1–0 loss to Swansea City. This was followed with a 0–0 draw with Coventry City. The Baggies bounced back by thrashing Watford 5–0. A 2–1 win over Leicester City kept the Baggies second. The Baggies trashed Bristol City 4–1, and then became the top goalscorers in the Football League when they humiliated Sheffield Wednesday 4–0, scoring 15 goals in 4 games.

December began with a draw against Derby County, following this with a defeat to promotion rivals Cardiff City and a late draw against QPR. The following two games ended in wins against strugglers Peterborough United and Scunthorpe United. The Baggies then lost to Nottingham Forest, causing the Baggies to drop to third. This was followed by draws to Newcastle United and Ipswich Town. Wins against Sheffield United, Blackpool, Plymouth and Scunthorpe put them top of the table. Cardiff City held West Brom to a 1–1 draw, with Gianni Zuiverloon scoring the equaliser. Bristol City beat them 2–1 but they quickly bounced back with a 3–1 win over Derby County. West Brom started March badly with a 3–1 loss to QPR, but wins against Sheffield Wednesday, Blackpool, Swansea, Preston and Coventry widened the gap between the play-offs and the automatic spots. On-form Reading held the Albion to a 1–1 draw. Playoff hopefuls Leicester City were the next to fall at the Hawthorns, where West Brom won 3–0. Chris Brunt then saved a point for West Brom after Danny Graham put Watford ahead. West Brom secured promotion back to the Premier League after a 3–2 win against Doncaster Rovers on 10 April 2010.

=== FA Cup ===
The third round saw West Brom beat League One side Huddersfield Town. West Brom then beat fellow Championship side Newcastle 4–2 in the fourth round to proceed to the fifth round. They drew with Reading in the fifth round but lost the subsequent replay.

=== League Cup ===
In the first round West Bromwich faced League Two side Bury, whom they beat 2–0. In the second round they were taken to extra time by another League Two side, Rotherham United, where Simon Cox scored his first goal for the club. The final score was 4–3. They were knocked out in the third round as they lost 2–0 against Arsenal.

== Players ==
Squad at end of season

=== First-team squad ===
Note: Flags indicate national team as defined under FIFA eligibility rules; some limited exceptions apply. Players may hold more than one non-FIFA nationality.

No.	Pos.	Nation	Player
1	GK	IRL	Dean Kiely (Note: Kiely was born in Salford, England, and represented them at U-15, U-16, and U-18 level, but also qualified to represent the Republic of Ireland internationally and made his international debut for the Republic of Ireland in November 1999.)
2	DF	ENG	Joe Mattock
3	DF	SWE	Jonas Olsson (vice-captain)
4	DF	SVK	Marek Čech
7	MF	SVN	Robert Koren
9	FW	CZE	Roman Bednář
10	FW	ENG	Ishmael Miller
11	MF	NIR	Chris Brunt
12	MF	ENG	Giles Barnes (Note: Barnes was born in Barking and Dagenham, England, and represented them at U-19 level, but also qualified to represent Jamaica internationally through his grandparents, declared for them internationally in 2014, and would make his international debut for Jamaica in May 2015.)
14	MF	ENG	Jerome Thomas
15	FW	NZL	Chris Wood
16	FW	ENG	Luke Moore
17	MF	SCO	Graham Dorrans
18	FW	ENG	Reuben Reid
19	GK	ENG	Scott Carson (club captain)
20	MF	POR	Filipe Teixeira (Note: Teixeira was born in Boulogne-Billancourt, France, but also qualified to represent Portugal internationally and represented them at U-18, U-20, and U-21 level.)
21	MF	COD	Youssuf Mulumbu (Note: Mulumbu was born in Kinshasa, Zaire (now Democratic Republic of the Congo), but also qualified to represent France internationally and represented them at U-20 and U-21 level before making his international debut for the Democratic Republic of the Congo in March 2008.)
22	DF	NED	Gianni Zuiverloon

No.	Pos.	Nation	Player
23	DF	CIV	Abdoulaye Méïté (Note: Méïté was born in Colombes, France, but also qualified to represent the Ivory Coast internationally and made his international debut for the Ivory Coast in 2003.)
25	MF	ENG	Joss Labadie
26	DF	ROU	Gabriel Tamaș (on loan from Auxerre)
27	MF	SCO	James Morrison (Note: Morrison was born in Darlington, England, and represented them at U-17, U-18, U-19, and U-21 level, but also qualified to represent Scotland internationally through his grandparents and made his international debut for Scotland in May 2008.)
29	FW	NED	Andwélé Slory (Note: Slory was born in Paramaribo, Suriname, but also qualified to represent the Netherlands internationally and made his international debut for the Netherlands in June 2007.)
30	DF	ENG	Paul Downing
31	FW	ENG	Simon Cox (Note: Cox was born in Tilehurst, England, but also qualified to represent the Republic of Ireland internationally through his grandfather and would make his international debut for the Republic of Ireland in May 2011.)
32	FW	ENG	Lateef Elford-Alliyu (Note: Elford-Alliyu was born in Ibadan, Nigeria, but also qualified to represent England internationally and represented them at U-17 level.)
33	DF	ENG	Dwayne Samuels
34	FW	WAL	Josh Knight
35	MF	ENG	Romaine Sawyers (Note: Sawyers was born in Birmingham, England, but also qualified to represent Saint Kitts and Nevis internationally and represented them at U-23 level before making his international debut for Saint Kitts and Nevis in October 2012.)
36	MF	CHI	Gonzalo Jara
37	MF	ENG	George Thorne
38	FW	ENG	Saido Berahino (Note: Berahino was born in Bujumbura, Burundi, but was raised in England from the age of 10 and represented them at every youth level between U-16 and U-21 level before making his international debut for Burundi in September 2018.)
39	GK	ENG	Ryan Allsop
41	MF	ENG	Sam Mantom
43	FW	WAL	Kayleden Brown (Note: Brown was born in Birmingham, England, but also qualified to represent Wales internationally and represented them at U-17 and U-19 level.)
44	MF	IRL	Steven Reid (Note: Reid was born in Kingston upon Thames, England, and represented them at U-16 level, but also qualified to represent the Republic of Ireland internationally through his grandfather and made his international debut for the Republic of Ireland in 2001.) (on loan from Blackburn Rovers)

=== Left club during season ===
Note: Flags indicate national team as defined under FIFA eligibility rules; some limited exceptions apply. Players may hold more than one non-FIFA nationality.

No.	Pos.	Nation	Player
5	DF	ENG	Leon Barnett (on loan to Coventry City)
6	DF	ENG	Neil Clement (retired)
8	MF	ENG	Jonathan Greening (on loan to Fulham)
12	FW	SCO	Craig Beattie (to Swansea City)
13	GK	ENG	Luke Daniels (on loan to Tranmere Rovers)
24	DF	ANT	Shelton Martis (to Doncaster Rovers)
24	MF	ENG	Ben Watson (on loan from Wigan Athletic)

No.	Pos.	Nation	Player
26	DF	ENG	Shaun Cummings (Note: Cummings was born in Hammersmith and Fulham, England, but also qualified to represent Jamaica internationally and would make his international debut for Jamaica in September 2013.) (on loan from Chelsea)
28	MF	ESP	Borja Valero (on loan to Mallorca)
29	DF	ENG	David Worrall (to Bury)
30	DF	ENG	Paul Downing (on loan to Hereford United)
40	FW	CAN	Marcus Haber (on loan to Vancouver Whitecaps)
42	FW	ENG	Frank Nouble (on loan from West Ham United)

== Player statistics ==
As of 31 May 2010

No.	Pos	Nat	Player	Total		Championship		FA Cup		League Cup	
No.	Pos	Nat	Player	Apps	Goals	Apps	Goals	Apps	Goals	Apps	Goals
1	GK	(Republic of Ireland) IRL	Dean Kiely	8	0	3+2	0	0	0	3	0
2	DF	(England) ENG	Joe Mattock	34	1	26+3	0	2+1	1	1+1	0
3	DF	(Sweden) SWE	Jonas Olsson	48	5	43	4	3	1	2	0
4	DF	(Slovakia) SVK	Marek Čech	37	2	29+4	2	2+1	0	1	0
5	DF	(England) ENG	Leon Barnett	5	0	0+2	0	0	0	3	0
7	MF	(Slovenia) SVN	Robert Koren	39	8	26+8	5	3+1	3	1	0
8	MF	(England) ENG	Jonathan Greening	2	0	2	0	0	0	0	0
9	FW	(Czech Republic) CZE	Roman Bednář	32	11	21+6	11	4	0	1	0
10	FW	(England) ENG	Ishmael Miller	16	2	4+11	2	0+1	0	0	0
11	MF	(Northern Ireland) NIR	Chris Brunt	43	13	39+1	13	3	0	0	0
12	FW	(Scotland) SCO	Craig Beattie	5	2	0+3	0	0	0	2	2
12	MF	(England) ENG	Giles Barnes	9	0	1+8	0	0	0	0	0
13	GK	(England) ENG	Luke Daniels	0	0	0	0	0	0	0	0
14	MF	(England) ENG	Jerome Thomas	29	8	22+5	7	1	1	1	0
15	FW	(New Zealand) NZL	Chris Wood	23	2	6+12	1	0+2	1	0+3	0
16	FW	(England) ENG	Luke Moore	29	4	23+3	4	1+1	0	1	0
17	MF	(Scotland) SCO	Graham Dorrans	52	18	42+3	13	4	3	3	2
18	FW	(England) ENG	Reuben Reid	8	0	1+4	0	0+1	0	2	0
19	GK	(England) ENG	Scott Carson	47	0	43	0	4	0	0	0
20	MF	(Portugal) POR	Filipe Teixeira	12	0	1+8	0	1	0	2	0
21	MF	(Democratic Republic of the Congo) COD	Youssuf Mulumbu	46	3	35+5	3	3+1	0	0+2	0
22	DF	(Netherlands) NED	Gianni Zuiverloon	35	4	26+4	4	2+1	0	2	0
23	DF	(Ivory Coast) CIV	Abdoulaye Méïté	24	0	16+4	0	2	0	1+1	0
24	DF	(Netherlands Antilles) ANT	Shelton Martis	15	2	10+3	2	1	0	1	0
24	MF	(England) ENG	Ben Watson	7	1	6+1	1	0	0	0	0
25	MF	(England) ENG	Joss Labadie	0	0	0	0	0	0	0	0
26	DF	(England) ENG	Shaun Cummings	4	0	3	0	0	0	1	0
26	DF	(Romania) ROU	Gabriel Tamaș	26	2	23	2	2+1	0	0	0
27	MF	(Scotland) SCO	James Morrison	12	1	5+6	1	0+1	0	0	0
28	MF	(Spain) ESP	Borja Valero	2	0	0+1	0	0	0	1	0
29	MF	(England) ENG	David Worrall	0	0	0	0	0	0	0	0
29	MF	(Netherlands) NED	Andwélé Slory	6	0	1+5	0	0	0	0	0
30	DF	(England) ENG	Paul Downing	0	0	0	0	0	0	0	0
31	FW	(England) ENG	Simon Cox	34	10	17+11	9	3	0	3	1
32	FW	(England) ENG	Lateef Elford-Alliyu	0	0	0	0	0	0	0	0
33	DF	(England) ENG	Dwayne Samuels	0	0	0	0	0	0	0	0
35	MF	(England) ENG	Romaine Sawyers	0	0	0	0	0	0	0	0
36	DF	(Chile) CHI	Gonzalo Jara	26	1	20+2	1	3	0	1	0
37	MF	(England) ENG	George Thorne	1	0	0+1	0	0	0	0	0
40	FW	(Canada) CAN	Marcus Haber	0	0	0	0	0	0	0	0
42	FW	(England) ENG	Frank Nouble	3	0	3	0	0	0	0	0
44	MF	(Republic of Ireland) IRL	Steven Reid	9	1	9	1	0	0	0	0

== Transfers ==
=== Summer ===
==== In ====
Date	#	Player	Club	Fee
8 July 2009	31	(England) Simon Cox	(England) Swindon Town	Undisclosed
10 July 2009	21	(Democratic Republic of the Congo) Youssuf Mulumbu	(France) Paris Saint-Germain	£750,000
31 July 2009	18	(England) Reuben Reid	(England) Rotherham United	Free
10 August 2009	2	(England) Joe Mattock	(England) Leicester City	Undisclosed
14 August 2009	14	(England) Jerome Thomas	(England) Portsmouth	Free
25 August 2009	36	(Chile) Gonzalo Jara	(Chile) Colo-Colo	£1,400,000

==== Out ====
Date	#	Player	Club	Fee
		(South Korea) Kim Do-heon	(South Korea) Suwon Bluewings	£360,000
		(Netherlands) Sherjill MacDonald	(Belgium) Germinal Beerschot	£650,000
21 August 2009		(Belgium) Carl Hoefkens	(Belgium) Club Brugge	Free
27 August 2009		(Scotland) Craig Beattie	(Wales) Swansea City	£500,000

=== Winter ===
==== In ====
Date	#	Player	Club	Fee
5 January 2010	40	(Canada) Marcus Haber	(Canada) Vancouver Whitecaps	Free
1 February 2010	29	(Netherlands) Andwélé Slory	(Netherlands) Feyenoord	Free
3 February 2010	12	(England) Giles Barnes	None	Free

==== Out ====
Date	#	Player	Club	Fee
	29	(England) David Worrall	(England) Bury	Free
	6	(England) Neil Clement		Retired
		(England) Paul Robinson	(England) Bolton Wanderers	Undisclosed
1 February 2010	24	(Netherlands Antilles) Shelton Martis	(England) Doncaster Rovers	Undisclosed

=== Loans in ===
#	Player	Club	Arrival Date	Return Date
26	(England) Shaun Cummings	(England) Chelsea	17 August	2 September
26	(Romania) Gabriel Tamaș	(France) Auxerre	1 January	End of season
42	(England) Frank Nouble	(England) West Ham United	9 February	9 March
24	(England) Ben Watson	(England) Wigan Athletic	22 February	1 April
44	(Republic of Ireland) Steven Reid	(England) Blackburn Rovers	5 March	End of season

=== Loans out ===
#	Player	Club	Arrival date	Return date
	(England) Paul Robinson	(England) Bolton Wanderers	12 July	End of season
13	(England) Luke Daniels	(England) Tranmere Rovers	21 July	End of season
25	(England) Joss Labadie	(England) Shrewsbury Town	3 August	3 September
29	(England) David Worrall	(England) Shrewsbury Town	6 August	6 September
8	(England) Jonathan Greening	(England) Fulham	22 August	End of season
28	(Spain) Borja Valero	(Spain) RCD Mallorca	31 August	End of season
25	(England) Joss Labadie	(England) Shrewsbury Town	6 September	6 January
5	(England) Leon Barnett	(England) Coventry City	4 November	31 January
25	(England) Joss Labadie	(England) Cheltenham Town	20 November	20 December
18	(England) Reuben Reid	(England) Peterborough United	6 January	6 April
30	(England) Paul Downing	(England) Hereford United	25 January	25 February
32	(England) Lateef Elford-Alliyu	(England) Hereford United	25 January	25 February
5	(England) Leon Barnett	(England) Coventry City	31 January	End of season
20	(Portugal) Filipe Teixeira	(England) Barnsley	1 February	End of season
40	(Canada) Marcus Haber	(England) Exeter City	18 February	18 March
30	(England) Paul Downing	(England) Hereford United	25 February	End of season
32	(England) Lateef Elford-Alliyu	(England) Hereford United	25 February	End of season
40	(Canada) Marcus Haber	(Canada) Vancouver Whitecaps	9 April	9 June

== Fixtures and results ==
Win Draw Loss

=== Pre-season friendlies ===
Date	Opponent	Venue	Result	Attendance	Scorers
11 July 2009	Histon	A	0–1	1,058	
15 July 2009	Nafta Lendava	A	3–0	–	Moore, Greening, Olsson
18 July 2009	NK Varteks	A	2–2	–	Beattie
22 July 2009	Shrewsbury Town	A	2–0	2,437	Moore, Koren
24 July 2009	Kidderminster Harriers	A	1–2	1,057	Elford-Alliyu
25 July 2009	Walsall	A	2–2	4,358	Moore, Beattie
28 July 2009	Swindon Town	A	0–1	2,482	
31 July 2009	Cheltenham Town	A	1–2	–	Wood
1 August 2009	Cheivo	H	0–0	3,359	

=== Championship ===
Date	Opponent	Venue	Result	Attendance	Scorers
8 August 2009	Newcastle United	H	1–1	23,502 (2,600)	Martis
15 August 2009	Nottingham Forest	A	1–0	22,794 (2,373)	own goal
18 August 2009	Peterborough United	A	3–2	8,752	Moore (2), Brunt
22 August 2009	Ipswich Town	H	2–0	19,390	Mulumbu, Koren
29 August 2009	Sheffield United	A	2–2	25,169	Bednář (2)
12 September 2009	Plymouth Argyle	H	3–1	22,190 (905)	Martis, Čech (2)
15 September 2009	Doncaster Rovers	H	3–1	22,184 (1,184)	Olsson (2), Wood
19 September 2009	Middlesbrough	A	5–0	22,725 (1,633)	Brunt (2), Mulumbu, Bednář, Thomas
26 September 2009	Crystal Palace	H	0–1	21,007	
29 September 2009	Barnsley	A	1–3	12,191	Brunt
3 October 2009	Preston North End	A	0–0	11,180	
17 October 2009	Reading	H	3–1	20,935	Thomas(2), Mulumbu
20 October 2009	Swansea City	H	0–1	21,022	
24 October 2009	Coventry City	A	0–0	20,871	
31 October 2009	Watford	H	5–0	21,421 (1,293)	Olsson, Dorrans, Moore, Zuiverloon, Cox
6 November 2009	Leicester City	A	2–1	28,748	Dorrans, Jara
21 November 2009	Bristol City	H	4–1	23,444 (2,600)	Thomas, Brunt, own goal, Cox
28 November 2009	Sheffield Wednesday	A	4–0	20,824	Cox (2), Thomas, Brunt
5 December 2009	Derby County	A	2–2	30,127 (3,065)	Cox, Dorrans
8 December 2009	Cardiff City	H	0–2	20,742	
14 December 2009	Queens Park Rangers	H	2–2	21,565	Thomas, Cox
26 December 2009	Peterborough United	H	2–0	24,924	Moore, own goal
28 December 2009	Scunthorpe United	A	3–1	7,221 (1,800)	Dorrans (2), Zuiverloon
8 January 2010	Nottingham Forest	H	1–3	22,873 (2,554)	Bednář
18 January 2010	Newcastle United	A	2–2	39,921	Olsson, Bednář
26 January 2010	Ipswich Town	A	1–1	19,574 (865)	Brunt
30 January 2010	Sheffield United	H	3–1	22,193	Dorrans, Bednář, Thomas
3 February 2010	Blackpool	A	3–2	7,221 (1,426)	Bednář (2), Dorrans
6 February 2010	Plymouth Argyle	A	1–0	12,053	Cox
9 February 2010	Scunthorpe United	H	2–0	23,146	Bednář, Zuiverloon
16 February 2010	Cardiff City	A	1–1	20,758	Zuiverloon
21 February 2010	Bristol City	A	1–2	14,374 (1,587)	Dorrans
27 February 2010	Derby County	H	3–1	23,335 (2,200)	Brunt (2), Cox
6 March 2010	Queens Park Rangers	A	1–3	14,578 (2,302)	Brunt
9 March 2010	Sheffield Wednesday	H	1–0	20,458	Koren
13 March 2010	Blackpool	H	3–2	21,592 (1,022)	Miller, Koren, Dorrans
16 March 2010	Swansea City	A	2–0	17,774 (958)	Dorrans, Miller
20 March 2010	Preston North End	H	3–2	21,343 (882)	Watson, Brunt, Dorrans
24 March 2010	Coventry City	H	1–0	22,140	Reid
27 March 2010	Reading	A	1–1	20,515 (2,948)	Tamaș
2 April 2010	Leicester City	H	3–0	23,334 (1,420)	Morrison, Koren (2)
5 April 2010	Watford	A	1–1	14,555	Brunt
10 April 2010	Doncaster Rovers	A	3–2	12,708 (3,200)	Dorrans, Brunt, Bednář
17 April 2010	Middlesbrough	H	2–0	22,548 (663)	Cox, Bednář
26 April 2010	Crystal Palace	A	1–1	17,798	Tamaș
2 May 2010	Barnsley	H	1–1	25,297 (700)	Dorrans

=== FA Cup ===
Round	Date	Opponent	Venue	Result	Attendance	Scorers
Third round	2 January 2010	Huddersfield Town	A	2–0	13,472	Dorrans, Wood
Fourth round	23 January 2010	Newcastle United	H	4–2	16,102	Olsson, Dorrans (2), Thomas
Fifth round	13 February 2010	Reading	A	2–2	18,008	Koren, Mattock
Fifth round replay	24 February 2010	Reading	H	2–3	13,982 (1,376)	Koren (2)

=== League Cup ===
Round	Date	Opponent	Venue	Result	Attendance	Scorers
First round	11 August 2009	Bury	A	2–0	3,077	Dorrans, own goal
Second round	26 August 2009	Rotherham United	H	4–3	10,659 (611)	Beattie (2), Dorrans, Cox
Third round	23 September 2009	Arsenal	A	0–2	56,592 (4,062)	

== See also ==
- West Bromwich Albion F.C. seasons
- 2009–10 Football League Championship
