= Chris Brunt =

Northern Irish footballer (born 1984)

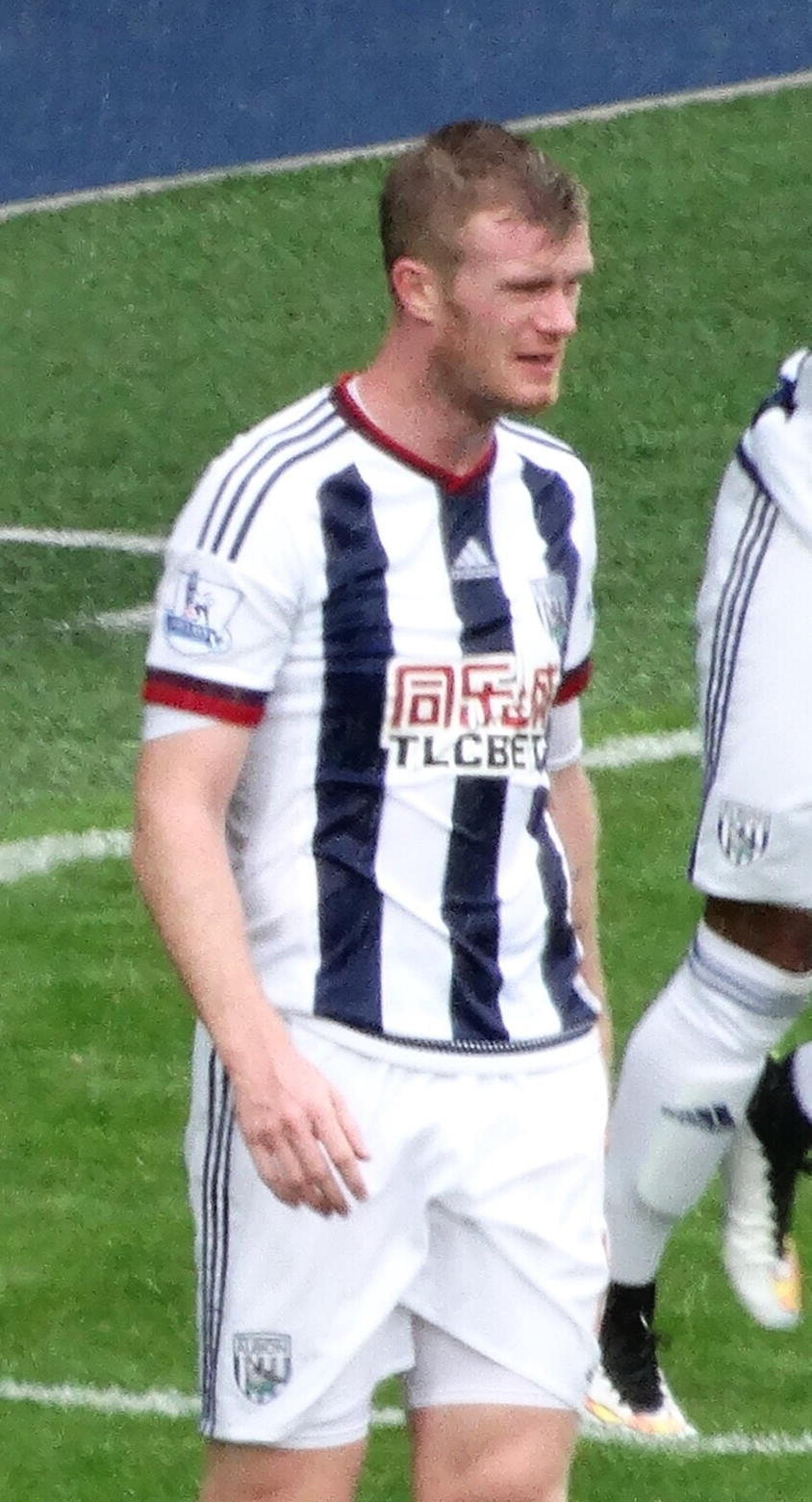
- Brunt playing for West Bromwich Albion in 2015

Personal information
- Full name: Christopher Colin Brunt
- Date of birth: 14 December 1984 (age 41)
- Place of birth: Belfast, Northern Ireland
- Height: 6 ft 2 in (1.87 m)
- Positions: Left winger; left-back; attacking midfielder

Youth career
- 2001–2002: Middlesbrough

Senior career*
Years	Team	Apps	(Gls)
2002–2004	Middlesbrough	0	(0)
2004	→ Sheffield Wednesday (loan)	6	(2)
2004–2007	Sheffield Wednesday	134	(21)
2007–2020	West Bromwich Albion	382	(55)
2020–2021	Bristol City	12	(0)
Total		602	(78)

International career
2004	Northern Ireland U19	8	(3)
2005–2006	Northern Ireland U21	2	(1)
2005	Northern Ireland U23	1	(0)
2004–2017	Northern Ireland	65	(3)

Managerial career
- 2024–2025: West Bromwich Albion (caretaker)
- * Club domestic league appearances and goals

Christopher Colin Brunt (born 14 December 1984) is a Northern Irish professional football manager and former player who played as a midfielder. He is currently the loan player manager of EFL Championship club West Bromwich Albion.

A versatile player, Brunt featured primarily as a left winger, but could also be deployed as a left-back or attacking midfielder. Brunt started his career with Middlesbrough but did not manage to make an appearance for the first team. He joined Sheffield Wednesday in 2004 and amassed 153 appearances for the club before joining West Bromwich Albion in 2007, where he went on to feature in over 400 matches. He would later depart the latter at the end of the 2019–20 season, joining Bristol City, before his subsequent departure from Bristol in January 2021. Later that year in May, he retired from football.

Brunt earned 65 caps for the Northern Ireland national team between 2004 and 2017. He also represented his country at various youth levels.

== Early life ==
Brunt was born and raised in Belfast, Northern Ireland, where he attended Newtownbreda Primary School. He then went on to study at Wellington College Belfast. As a youth player, he appeared for Saint Andrew's Boys' Club.

== Club career ==
=== Middlesbrough ===
Brunt had trials with professional teams Rangers and Middlesbrough as a 16-year-old. He joined Middlesbrough's academy in 2001 and signed his first professional contract a year later. However, he failed to break into the first team at the Teesside club.

=== Sheffield Wednesday ===
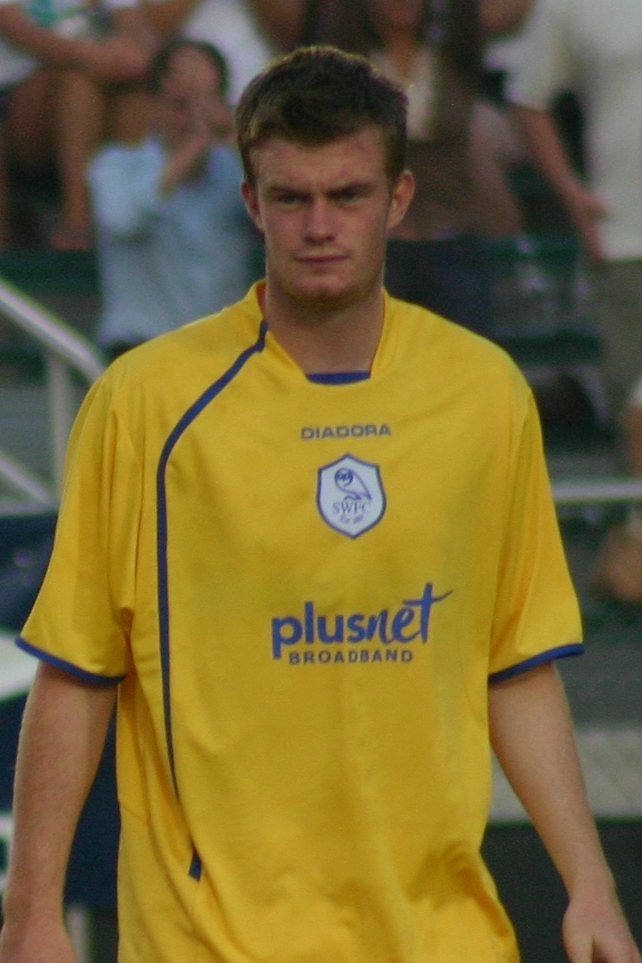
Brunt playing for Sheffield Wednesday in 2006

He moved to Sheffield Wednesday in March 2004 on an initial short-term deal. A permanent free transfer followed soon after as Brunt signed a two-year contract at Wednesday.

In the 2004–05 season, his first full season at the club, Brunt helped Wednesday achieve promotion to the Championship by scoring five goals in all competitions with four of those coming in the league. In July 2005, he agreed a one-year extension to his existing contract.

He went on to hit seven goals the following season, finishing the campaign as the club's top goalscorer. He also passed the 100 appearance mark for Wednesday during the 2005–06 season, making him the club's most experienced player at the time.

With only one year remaining on his contract, negotiations between Brunt and Wednesday broke down in July 2007, due to what the club described as 'excessive wage demands'.

=== West Bromwich Albion ===
==== 2007–2010: Securing top-flight status ====
West Bromwich Albion's bid for Brunt was accepted on 14 August 2007. They completed the signing the next day, in a £3 million four-year deal, which included £500,000 of performance-related add-ons. Brunt made his Albion debut as a second-half substitute in a 2–0 home win over Barnsley on 1 September 2007. He scored his first goal for the club in a 3–2 victory away at Scunthorpe United on 22 September 2007.

Brunt's performance in the 3–0 home win against Plymouth Argyle on 1 March 2008 saw him named in the Championship Team of the Week. On 28 April 2008, Brunt scored a late equalising goal against Southampton in a 1–1 draw; this effectively secured Albion's promotion to the Premier League because of their superior goal difference. He went on to score the free kick in West Brom's 2–0 win over Queens Park Rangers (QPR) that sealed automatic promotion.

Brunt was the club's top scorer in the 2008–09 season, scoring nine goals. This season ended in disappointment for Brunt and his West Brom teammates as the club were relegated, finishing in last place. He was named the club's Player of the Year for the 2008–09 season.

He enjoyed the most prolific goalscoring campaign of his career to date in the 2009–10 season with 13 goals in 43 games in all competitions. The Northern Ireland native once again helped the club reach the highest tier of English football, scoring the second goal in a 3–2 away win over Doncaster on 10 April 2010, which sealed the club's Premier League status. Brunt signed a new three-year contract in July 2010 to keep him at the club until the summer of 2013.

==== 2011–2014: Club captain ====
In January 2011, Brunt was made stand-in captain as the manager decided to drop previous club captain Scott Carson. When Roy Hodgson took charge of the Baggies in February 2011, he made Brunt the settled captain of the club. He signed another three-year contract in August 2011 as a result of his impressive form, tying him to the club until June 2014.

He continued to be club captain after a new head coach was appointed when Hodgson had left to manage the England national team.

Brunt helped the team secure an 8th-place finish in the 2012–13 season, the highest the club has finished in the Premier League era, while also helping to secure the record number of points for the club (48). He scored twice in the season, his first a 30-yard strike at QPR which Albion won 2–1 and the second a finish from the edge of the box in a 2–2 draw at home to Aston Villa.

Alan Irvine confirmed Brunt would remain as club captain when he was appointed West Brom manager in the summer of 2014. He signed a new three-year deal on 10 August 2014 to keep him at the club until the summer of 2017.

==== 2015–2020: Injury and comeback ====
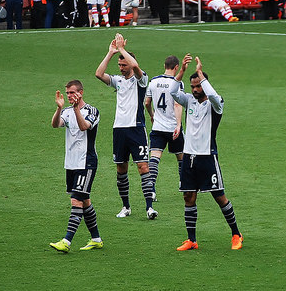
Brunt (left) applauding the West Bromwich Albion supporters at Arsenal's Emirates Stadium in May 2015

Brunt relinquished the captaincy to new signing Darren Fletcher when the former Manchester United player made his debut for West Brom on 8 February 2015 in a match against Burnley. On 18 May 2015, Brunt was hit in the head by a ball kicked by Cesc Fàbregas in a match against Chelsea which later resulted in the sending off of Fàbregas.

On 20 February 2016, Brunt was struck on the face by a coin thrown by a West Brom supporter after the end of an FA Cup Fifth Round tie against Championship side Reading. Brunt was appalled by the incident, stating: "If people come to football matches and think it is acceptable to throw coins at footballers or anyone else, it is disgusting."

Brunt returned to first-team action after eight months out with an anterior cruciate knee injury in the 1–1 draw against Tottenham Hotspur at The Hawthorns on 15 October 2016. He scored his first goal of the 2016–17 season on 3 December in a 3–1 home win over Watford, ending a run of 29 Premier League appearances without a goal. His second goal of the season came on 2 January 2017 in a 3–1 home victory against Hull City, when he headed in a ball delivered from a Matt Phillips corner kick. 12 days later, he made his 300th league appearance and 200th Premier League start for West Brom in the next fixture against Tottenham at White Hart Lane which ended in a 4–0 defeat for the West Midlands club. On 9 February 2017, Brunt signed a contract extension which would keep him at the club until June 2018 with an option for another year should he trigger a clause relating to appearances. He made his 500th career appearance in club football against Burnley on 19 August 2017 and the following month on 30 September, made his 350th appearance for Albion, against Watford.

On 4 June 2020, it was announced that Brunt would depart West Brom at the expiration of his contract following the conclusion of the 2019–20 season, having spent 13 years with the club and made over 400 appearances. On 22 July, in his final game for West Brom, Brunt helped the side seal promotion to the Premier League with a 2–2 draw against Queens Park Rangers, officially ending his time with Albion. Brunt holds Albion's Premier League appearance record for a player, having turned out 269 times for the club in the competition.

=== Bristol City ===
Following his departure from The Baggies, on 7 September 2020, Brunt signed for Championship side Bristol City on a one-year deal.

On 3 January 2021, Bristol announced that they had mutually agreed to terminate Brunt's contract after he had sustained an injury which ruled him out for most of the remaining season.

Retirement

On 28 May 2021, Brunt announced his retirement from professional football, ending a 19-year career with over 580 appearances made.

== International career ==
Brunt made 65 appearances for the Northern Ireland national team. He scored his first goal for his country in February 2009, when his free kick helped Northern Ireland to a 3–0 away victory over San Marino. In April 2012, it was revealed that Brunt was in manager Stuart Pearce's provisional squad for the 2012 Olympic Great Britain football team. He was in the end not selected in the final 18-man squad for the Games.

He missed out on the chance to appear at Euro 2016 after damaging his anterior cruciate ligament which required surgery. On 11 November 2016, Brunt returned to the international scene for Northern Ireland's 2018 World Cup qualification match against Azerbaijan. After sustaining a head injury early on, he recovered to set up a goal for club teammate Gareth McAuley and scored the final goal of a 4–0 win.

He announced his retirement from international football in August 2018.

== Coaching career ==
In March 2021, Brunt returned to West Bromwich Albion as an academy coach. The following year, he was appointed as the club's loans manager.

=== West Bromwich Albion (interim) ===
In December 2024, after Carlos Corberán's departure, Brunt became the interim manager for West Bromwich Albion, once again returning to the club in a non-player role. His first game in charge was a 2–1 loss against Derby County.

== Personal life ==
Brunt became a father for the first time on 1 May 2008, when his wife Cathy gave birth to a baby boy named Charlie. The couple then welcomed a second child, Zach David Brunt, on 18 April 2011. Brunt is the cousin of retired Canadian ice hockey player Shawn Thornton.

== Career statistics ==
=== Club ===
Appearances and goals by club, season and competition
Club	Season	League			FA Cup		League Cup		Other		Total	
Club	Season	Division	Apps	Goals	Apps	Goals	Apps	Goals	Apps	Goals	Apps	Goals
Sheffield Wednesday	2003–04	Second Division	9	2	—		—		—		9	2
Sheffield Wednesday	2004–05	League One	42	4	1	0	2	0	4 (Note: One appearance in Football League Trophy, three appearances and one goal in League One play-offs)	1	49	5
Sheffield Wednesday	2005–06	Championship	44	7	1	0	2	0	—		47	7
Sheffield Wednesday	2006–07	Championship	44	10	2	0	1	0	—		47	10
Sheffield Wednesday	2007–08	Championship	1	0	—		—		—		1	0
Sheffield Wednesday	Total		140	23	4	0	5	0	4	1	153	24
West Bromwich Albion	2007–08	Championship	34	5	6	1	1	0	—		41	6
West Bromwich Albion	2008–09	Premier League	34	9	3	0	1	0	—		38	9
West Bromwich Albion	2009–10	Championship	40	13	3	0	0	0	—		43	13
West Bromwich Albion	2010–11	Premier League	34	4	1	0	0	0	—		35	4
West Bromwich Albion	2011–12	Premier League	29	2	0	0	1	1	—		30	3
West Bromwich Albion	2012–13	Premier League	31	2	1	0	1	1	—		33	3
West Bromwich Albion	2013–14	Premier League	28	3	0	0	1	0	—		29	3
West Bromwich Albion	2014–15	Premier League	34	2	4	1	1	0	—		39	3
West Bromwich Albion	2015–16	Premier League	22	0	3	0	1	0	—		26	0
West Bromwich Albion	2016–17	Premier League	31	3	0	0	0	0	—		31	3
West Bromwich Albion	2017–18	Premier League	26	0	3	0	0	0	—		29	0
West Bromwich Albion	2018–19	Championship	32	2	1	0	1	0	2 (Note: Two appearances in Championship play-offs)	0	36	2
West Bromwich Albion	2019–20	Championship	7	0	3	0	1	0	—		11	0
West Bromwich Albion	Total		382	45	28	2	9	2	2	0	421	49
Bristol City	2020–21	Championship	12	0	0	0	2	0	—		14	0
Career total			534	68	32	2	16	2	6	1	588	73

=== International ===
Appearances and goals by national team and year
National team	Year	Apps	Goals
Northern Ireland	2004	1	0
Northern Ireland	2005	5	0
Northern Ireland	2006	1	0
Northern Ireland	2007	9	0
Northern Ireland	2008	5	0
Northern Ireland	2009	5	1
Northern Ireland	2010	5	0
Northern Ireland	2011	5	0
Northern Ireland	2012	4	0
Northern Ireland	2013	5	0
Northern Ireland	2014	3	0
Northern Ireland	2015	6	0
Northern Ireland	2016	2	1
Northern Ireland	2017	9	1
Total		65	3

Northern Ireland score listed first, score column indicates score after each Brunt goal.

List of international goals scored by Chris Brunt
No.	Date	Venue	Cap	Opponent	Score	Result	Competition	Ref.
1	11 February 2009	San Marino Stadium, Serravalle, San Marino	22	San Marino	3–0	3–0	2010 FIFA World Cup qualification	
2	11 November 2016	Windsor Park, Belfast, Northern Ireland	55	Azerbaijan	4–0	4–0	2018 FIFA World Cup qualification	
3	4 September 2017	Windsor Park, Belfast, Northern Ireland	61	Czech Republic	2–0	2–0	2018 FIFA World Cup qualification	

=== Managerial statistics ===
As of match played 18 January 2025

Managerial record by team and tenure
Team	From	To	Record					Ref
Team	From	To	P	W	D	L	Win %	Ref
West Bromwich Albion (interim)	26 December 2024	18 January 2025	6	1	3	2	16.67	
Total			6	1	3	2	16.67	

== Honours ==
Sheffield Wednesday

- Football League One play-offs: 2005

West Bromwich Albion

- Football League Championship: 2007–08; runner-up: 2009–10, 2019–20

Individual

- West Bromwich Albion Player of the Year: 2008–09
