= Abdoulaye Méïté =

Ivorian footballer (born 1980)

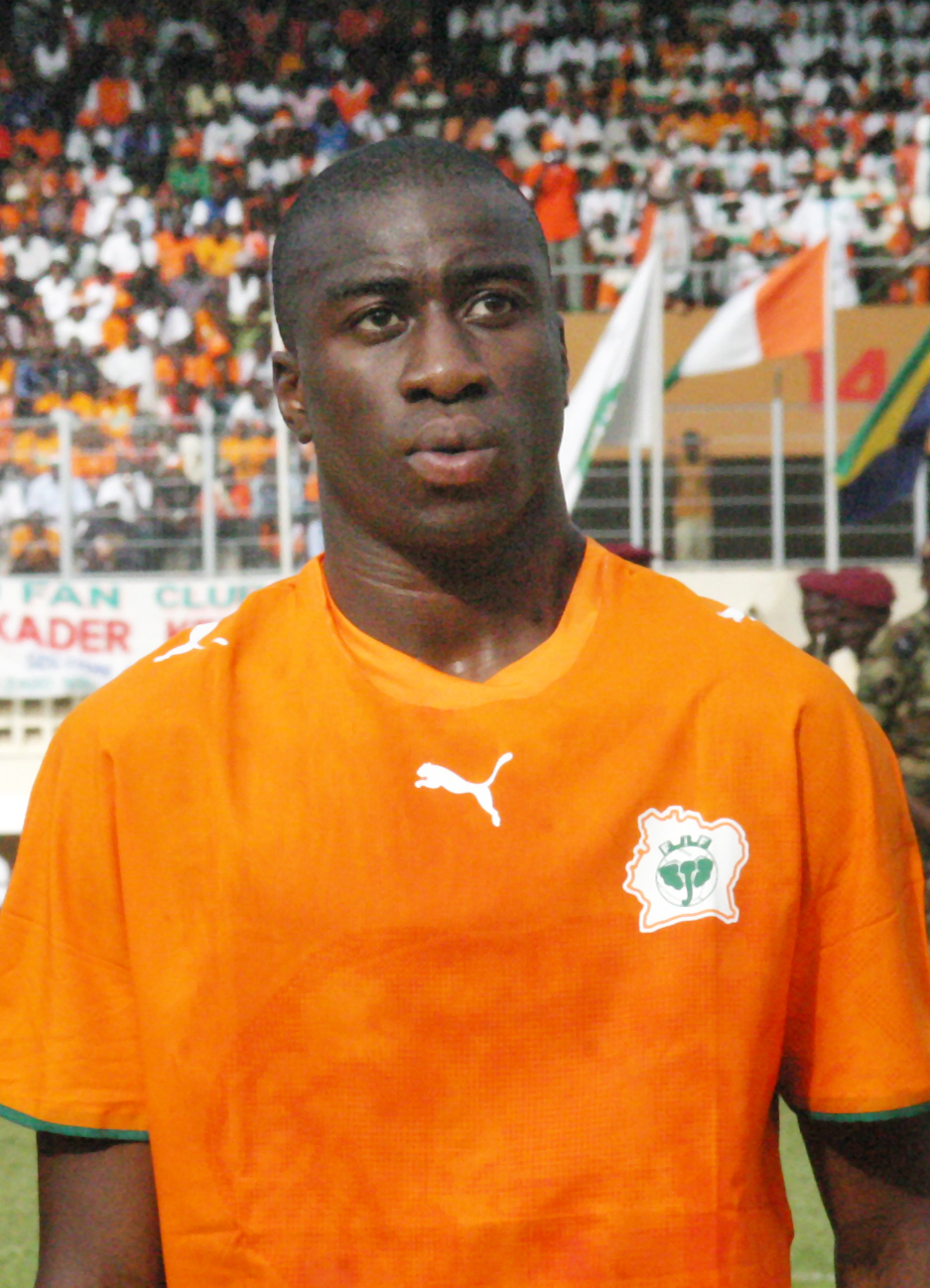
- Meïté in 2006

Personal information
- Full name: Abdoulaye Méïté
- Date of birth: 6 October 1980 (age 46)
- Place of birth: Colombes, France
- Height: 1.85 m (6 ft 1 in)
- Position: Centre back

Senior career*
Years	Team	Apps	(Gls)
1998–2000	Red Star	28	(3)
2001–2006	Marseille	116	(3)
2006–2008	Bolton Wanderers	56	(0)
2008–2011	West Bromwich Albion	48	(0)
2011–2012	Dijon	25	(1)
2013	FC Honka	25	(0)
2014	Doncaster Rovers	16	(1)
2014–2015	OFI	9	(0)
2015	Ross County	0	(0)
2016	SJK	18	(1)
2016–2017	Newport County	4	(0)
2017	FC Lusitanos	1	(0)
Total		346	(9)

International career
2003–2011	Ivory Coast	48	(1)
- * Club domestic league appearances and goals

Abdoulaye Méïté (born 6 October 1980) is an Ivorian former footballer who played as a centre-back. Born in France, he represented the Ivory Coast national team, making a total of 48 international appearances. Méïté also enjoyed a lengthy career in European club football, where he was known for his defensive abilities.

== Club career ==
=== Red Star ===
Méïté's first club at the age of 167 was the Division 2 Paris side, Red Star 93. He joined the club in 1998, before being snapped up by Olympique de Marseille.

=== Marseille ===
Méïté joined Marseille in July 2000, where he made 172 league appearances, as well as many in European competitions – including one against Bolton in January 2006. Whilst at Marseille, he started in the 2004 UEFA Cup Final.

=== Bolton Wanderers ===
Méïté moved to Bolton Wanderers in July 2006. He scored two goals for Bolton: one in the 3–1 FA Cup defeat to Arsenal on 14 February 2007, and the other in a 1–1 draw with ZFK Rabotnički Kometal of Macedonia in the UEFA Cup on 20 September the same year.

He was involved in controversy during Bolton's defeat against Manchester United at Old Trafford in March 2008. Manager Gary Megson blamed him for two goals that Bolton had conceded in the first half of the game (both scored by Cristiano Ronaldo), and Méïté refused to come out for the second half. He claimed he was unfit to carry on, but the Bolton medical staff confirmed that there was no injury. Megson subsequently forced Méïté to train with the reserves, and the player was widely expected to move on from the Reebok Stadium. He never played for Bolton again; he was not selected for any of the remaining eight Premier League fixtures in the 2007–08 season. He had previously missed only twelve League games in the two years he had been at Bolton, and five of these were while he was representing Ivory Coast in the African Nations Cup in January and February 2008.

=== West Bromwich Albion ===
As the 2008–09 season approached, Méïté was linked with Premier League newcomers West Bromwich Albion and Hull City, both of which had bids accepted by Bolton. Méïté chose to sign for West Brom on 10 August 2008 for an initial fee of £2 million, which could rise to £2.5 million depending on appearances. The contract covers three years, with a fourth year in the club's favour. Meïté made his debut in a 1–0 defeat to Arsenal in the opening game of the 2008–09 Premier League season.

His first season at West Brom was interrupted by a series of injuries, with four separate spells out of the side restricting him to 18 appearances. For the first ten Championship games of the 2009–10 season, Shelton Martis was preferred by the Baggies' new first team coach, Roberto Di Matteo, and there was speculation that Méïté might be allowed to leave. Following a disappointing run of results, culminating in a catastrophic defensive display against Barnsley when Martis scored an own goal, Méïté returned to the side against Preston North End on 3 October, and Albion conceded just four goals in the next eight games. Following a 4–0 win away to Sheffield Wednesday at the end of November, Di Matteo picked out Méïté and his central defensive partner Jonas Olsson for praise: "Jonas leads the back four most of the time but Abou is also doing a great job."

Having played 20 games in the Championship promotion season, mostly alongside Olsson in the centre of defence, Méïté was left out in the cold by Di Matteo in the 2010–11 Premier League campaign, playing only in the League Cup. Since the sacking of Di Matteo in early 2011, due to a poor sequence of results, Méïté has seen a revival under the tutelage of new head coach Roy Hodgson.

To the surprise of many Albion fans, Méïté was brought back to partner Olsson against Stoke City, which added to the 3–3 draw vs West Ham under caretaker manager Michael Appleton, has resulted in a 7-game unbeaten run, including a 2–1 home win over Liverpool.

The organizational skills brought in by Hodgson has galvanized the Albion defensive unit, with Méïté bringing a composed, positional sense to the controlled aggression of Olsson.

On 25 May 2011, Méïté was released by West Bromwich Albion.

=== Dijon ===
On 30 June 2011, Méïté was signed by Ligue 1 newcomers Dijon FCO. With the club's relegation to Ligue 2, Méïté left the club. In September 2012, he started training with AS Cannes to maintain his fitness.

=== FC Honka ===
On 25 March 2013, Méïté was signed by Veikkausliiga side FC Honka. He was selected as the Veikkausliiga Player of the Month and in the Team of the Month for August 2013.

=== Doncaster Rovers ===
On 9 January 2014, Méïté signed for Doncaster Rovers in a deal until the end of the season.

=== Ross County ===
On 12 February 2015, Méïté signed for Ross County on a free transfer until the end of the season. He was one of 14 players released by Ross County at the end of the season.

=== Seinäjoen Jalkapallokerho ===
In February 2016, Méïté signed a one-year contract with Finnish Veikkausliiga side Seinäjoen Jalkapallokerho. He left SJK on 31 August 2016, after his contract was terminated by mutual consent.

=== Newport County ===
On 25 November 2016, Méïté joined Welsh side Newport County on non-contractual terms. He made his debut the following day in a 4–1 defeat against Blackpool as a second-half substitute. He was released by Newport County on 14 January 2017.

=== FC Lusitanos ===
In November 2017, he signed with FC Lusitanos in Andorra.

== International career ==
Meïté made his debut for the Ivory Coast national team on 10 September 2003 in a friendly match against Tunisia. He subsequently featured in the 2006 FIFA World Cup qualifiers and the 2006 Africa Cup of Nations qualifiers, establishing himself as one of the national team's key defenders.

At the 2006 Africa Cup of Nations, he appeared in the group-stage match against Libya and the semi-final against Nigeria. Ivory Coast finished as runners-up after losing to Egypt in the final.

Later that year, he also participated in the 2006 FIFA World Cup, held in Germany. He appeared in the group-stage matches against Argentina and the Netherlands. Ivory Coast lost both matches and were eliminated in the group stage.

At the 2008 Africa Cup of Nations, Meïté appeared in the group-stage matches against Nigeria and Benin, as well as the quarter-final against Guinea and the semi-final against Egypt. Ivory Coast lost 4–1 to Egypt in the semi-final and subsequently lost 4–2 to Ghana in the third-place play-off, finishing in fourth place.

Meïté later featured in the 2010 FIFA World Cup qualifiers, including a match against Burkina Faso in June 2009. His final appearance for the national team came in a friendly against the South Korea national team on 3 March 2010.

Meïté represented Ivory Coast internationally from 2003 to 2011, making 48 appearances and scoring one goal.

== Honours ==
Marseille

- Intertoto Cup: 2005
- UEFA Cup runner-up: 2003–04

Ivory Coast

- Africa Cup of Nations runner-up: 2006

Individual

- Veikkausliiga Player of the Month: August 2013
