= Gianni Zuiverloon =

Dutch footballer (born 1986)

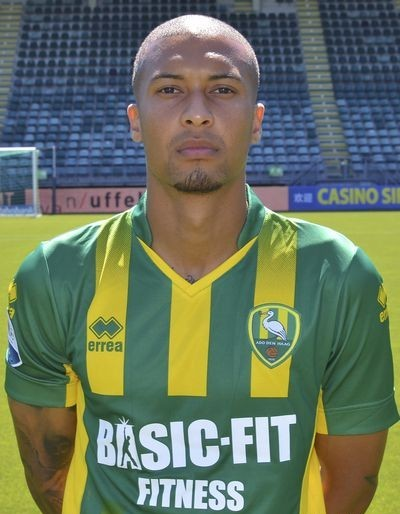
- Zuiverloon with ADO Den Haag in 2015

Personal information
- Full name: Gianni Michel Eugene Zuiverloon
- Date of birth: 30 December 1986 (age 39)
- Place of birth: Rotterdam, Netherlands
- Height: 1.80 m (5 ft 11 in)
- Positions: Right-back; centre-back

Youth career
- 1993–2004: Feyenoord

Senior career*
Years	Team	Apps	(Gls)
2004–2006	Feyenoord	10	(0)
2005–2006	→ RKC Waalwijk (loan)	28	(1)
2006–2008	Heerenveen	60	(3)
2008–2011	West Bromwich Albion	65	(4)
2010	→ Ipswich Town (loan)	4	(0)
2011–2013	Mallorca	9	(0)
2012–2013	→ Heerenveen (loan)	10	(0)
2013–2016	ADO Den Haag	80	(3)
2016–2018	Cultural Leonesa	50	(2)
2018–2019	Delhi Dynamos	17	(2)
2019–2020	Kerala Blasters	8	(0)
2020–2021	ADO Den Haag	8	(0)
Total		349	(15)

International career
2005–2008	Netherlands U21	22	(0)
- * Club domestic league appearances and goals

Gianni Michel Eugene Zuiverloon (Dutch pronunciation: [dʑiˈjɑni ˈzœyvərloːn]; born 30 December 1986) is a Dutch former footballer who played as a right-back or centre-back. He represented the Netherlands at youth level and also played abroad for football clubs in England, Spain and India.

== Club career ==
=== Early career ===
Zuiverloon was born in Rotterdam, Netherlands. He started his football career at the age of six at Feyenoord.

Due to the injury of a teammate (Dustley Mulder) at Feyenoord, coach Ruud Gullit selected Zuiverloon for the first team, where he made his debut in professional football in the season of 2004–05. His first game was against Willem II, on 22 August 2004. He played a total of ten games that season, scoring no goals. In order to get more first-team experience, he was loaned out to RKC Waalwijk in the 2005–06 season, where he played a total of 28 games.

In June 2006, he signed a three-year deal with his new club Heerenveen. The year before, he was loaned to RKC Waalwijk, scoring his only goal that season against Heerenveen.

=== West Bromwich Albion ===
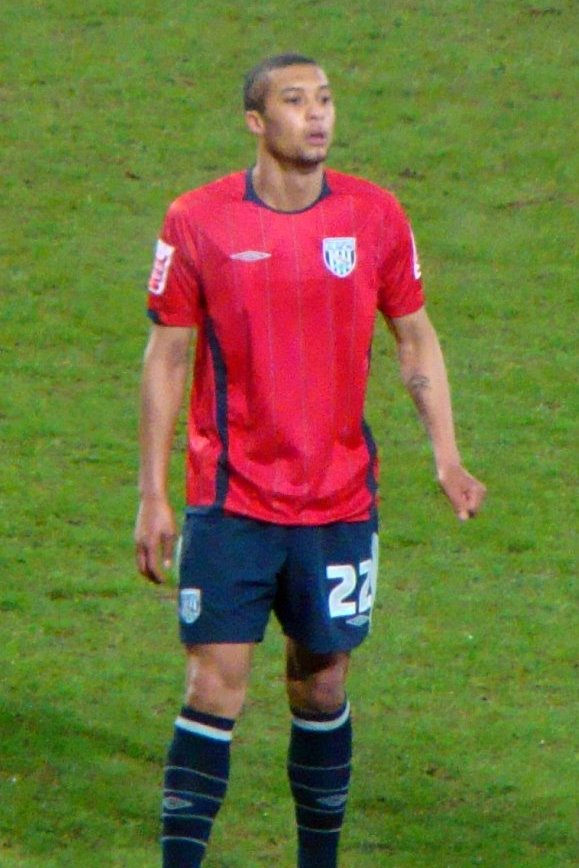
Zuiverloon in February 2010

On 2 July 2008, it was confirmed by Heerenveen that Zuiverloon had signed a three-year deal, with an extra year in the club's favour, for West Bromwich Albion of the Premier League for £3.2 million. He made his debut for West Brom in a 2–1 loss against Everton. His first Albion goal came in the FA Cup, in the 3–1 defeat to Burnley on 3 February 2009. Following West Brom losing to Liverpool 2–0, Albion were relegated to the Championship after one season in the Premier League.

In his second season, Zuiverloon established himself in the first team under manager Roberto Di Matteo. He scored his first league goal for West Brom in a 5–0 win over Watford on 31 October 2009 and went on to score in both games against Scunthorpe United, and against Cardiff City, as his team secured promotion to the Premier League after finishing second place in the Championship.

In his third season for West Brom, Zuiverloon's first-team opportunities were limited while he made three starts in the League Cup, scoring in a 2–1 win against Manchester City on 22 September 2010. He was loaned out to Championship side Ipswich Town on the last day of the loan window. He later on returned to his parent club, after four appearances for Ipswich, in December 2010 as Di Matteo faced a defensive crisis. Zuiverloon made his return against Manchester United on 1 January 2011. Three days later, he made his last Premier League match for West Brom Albion against Fulham in a 3–0 loss. Following the match, he criticised Fulham defender John Pantsil for the tackle that forced Marek Cech out of the game.

Zuiverloon announced he would leave the club in the summer and join a new club where he could play regularly. Eventually, he was released by the club on 25 May 2011 along with his teammates Abdoulaye Meite and Giles Barnes.

=== Later career ===
On 10 July 2011, Zuiverloon signed a three-year deal for Spanish side Mallorca on a free transfer. He made his debut for the club as they beat Espanyol 1–0 on 29 August 2011. On 15 July 2012, Zuiverloon returned to Heerenveen on loan.

After his contract with Mallorca had been dissolved, Zuiverloon signed a three-year deal with Eredivisie side ADO Den Haag as a free agent in August 2013. Three years later, he returned to Spain with Segunda División B club Cultural y Deportiva Leonesa.

On 31 August 2018, Zuiverloon switched to Indian Super League club Delhi Dynamos FC. The following 26 June, he switched to Kerala Blasters FC in the same league.

== International career ==
Born in the Netherlands, Zuiverloon is of Surinamese descent. Zuiverloon was a Netherlands Under 21 regular.

In 2007, Zuiverloon was called up by Jong Oranje coach Foppe de Haan to be part of his squad for the 2007 UEFA European Under-21 Football Championship held in the Netherlands. Zuiverloon participated in both of their first round group matches against Israel (1–0 win) and Portugal (2–1 win) to secure a semi-final spot and to qualify for the 2008 Summer Olympics. In the semi-finals against England Zuiverloon had a great effort, playing a quality match which ended in 1–1 after extra time. In the following penalty shoot-out, with 32 kicks taken, Zuiverloon forced the decision with his strike past Scott Carson and brought the Dutch into their second straight final. The Dutch went on to retain their 2006 title by beating Serbia 4–1 in the final. After the tournament, he was named in the 'UEFA Team of the tournament'. At the 2008 Olympics, he helped the Netherlands to reach the quarter-finals, where they were defeated 2–1 by Argentina.

== Career statistics ==
Appearances and goals by club, season and competition
Club	Season	League			National cup (Note: Includes KNVB Cup, FA Cup, Copa del Rey.)		League cup (Note: Includes Football League Cup.)		Continental		Other		Total	
Club	Season	Division	Apps	Goals	Apps	Goals	Apps	Goals	Apps	Goals	Apps	Goals	Apps	Goals
Feyenoord	2004–05	Eredivisie	10	0	0	0	–		3	0	–		13	0
RKC Waalwijk	2005–06	Eredivisie	28	1	2	0	–		–		2	1	32	2
Heerenveen	2006–07	Eredivisie	30	1	1	0	–		6	0	2	0	39	1
Heerenveen	2007–08	Eredivisie	30	2	2	0	–		2	0	4	0	38	2
Heerenveen	Total		60	3	3	0	0	0	8	0	6	1	77	3
West Bromwich Albion	2008–09	Premier League	33	0	2	1	0	0	–		–		35	1
West Bromwich Albion	2009–10	Championship	30	4	3	0	2	0	–		–		35	4
West Bromwich Albion	2010–11	Premier League	2	0	1	0	3	1	–		–		6	1
West Bromwich Albion	Total		65	4	6	1	5	1	0	0	0	0	76	6
Ipswich Town (loan)	2010–11	Championship	4	0	0	0	0	0	–		–		4	0
Mallorca	2011–12	La Liga	9	0	3	0	–		–		–		12	0
Heerenveen (loan)	2012–13	Eredivisie	10	0	0	0	–		4	0	0	0	14	0
ADO Den Haag	2013–14	Eredivisie	26	0	1	0	–		–		–		27	0
ADO Den Haag	2014–15	Eredivisie	32	1	1	0	–		–		–		33	1
ADO Den Haag	2015–16	Eredivisie	22	2	1	0	–		–		–		23	2
ADO Den Haag	Total		80	3	3	0	0	0	0	0	0	0	83	3
Cultural Leonesa	2016–17	Segunda División B	24	2	4	0	–		–		2	0	30	2
Cultural Leonesa	2017–18	Segunda División	26	0	0	0	–		–		–		26	0
Cultural Leonesa	Total		50	2	4	0	0	0	0	0	2	0	56	2
Delhi Dynamos	2018–19	Indian Super League	17	2	1	0	–		–		–		18	2
Kerala Blasters	2019–20	Indian Super League	8	0	0	0	–		–		–		8	0
ADO Den Haag	2020–21	Eredivisie	8	0	0	0	–		–		–		8	0
Career total			349	15	22	1	5	1	15	0	10	1	401	18

== Honours ==
Cultural Leonesa

- Segunda División B: 2016–17

Netherlands U21

- UEFA European Under-21 Football Championship: 2007
