= Jonas Olsson (footballer, born 1983) =

Swedish footballer

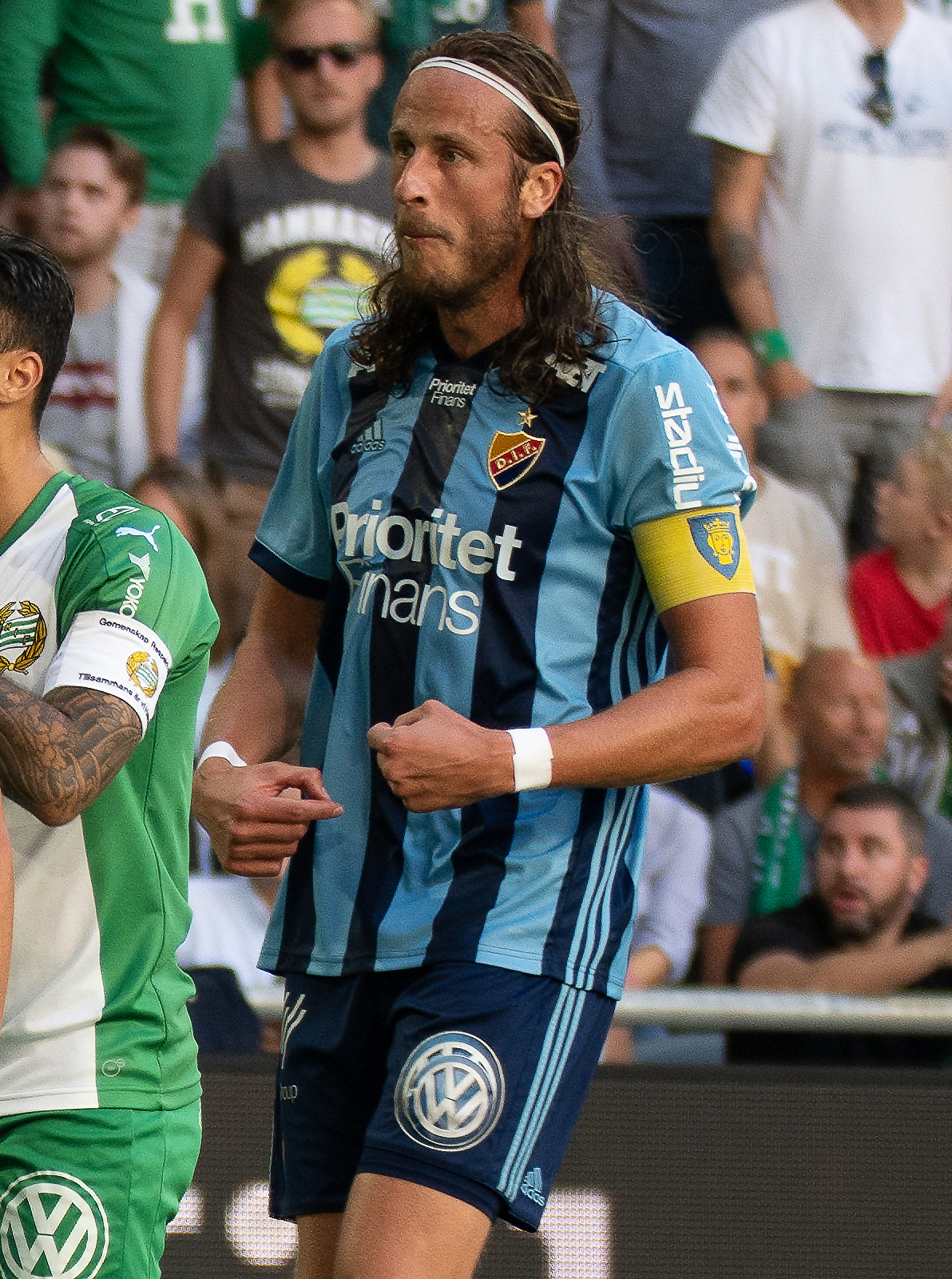
- Olsson playing for Djurgården in 2018

Personal information
- Full name: Olle Jonas Olsson
- Date of birth: 10 March 1983 (age 43)
- Place of birth: Landskrona, Sweden
- Height: 1.95 m (6 ft 5 in)
- Position: Centre-back

Senior career*
| Years | Team | Apps | (Gls) |
| 2003–2005 | Landskrona BoIS | 56 | (1) |
| 2005–2008 | NEC Nijmegen | 93 | (5) |
| 2008–2017 | West Bromwich Albion | 244 | (12) |
| 2017–2018 | Djurgårdens IF | 41 | (3) |
| 2019 | Wigan Athletic | 6 | (0) |
| Total | | 440 | (21) |

International career
| 2003–2005 | Sweden U21 | 19 | (1) |
| 2010–2015 | Sweden | 25 | (1) |
- * Club domestic league appearances and goals

Olle Jonas Olsson (born 10 March 1983) is a Swedish former professional footballer who played as a defender. Beginning his career with Landskrona BoIS in 2003, he went on to represent NEC Nijmegen, West Bromwich Albion, and Djurgårdens IF before retiring at Wigan Athletic in 2019. A full international between 2010 and 2015, he won 25 caps for the Sweden national team and represented his country at Euro 2012.

== Club career ==
=== Early career ===
Olsson was born in Landskrona and made his debut in professional football in 2003 as part of the Landskrona BoIS squad. Olsson is considered to be a very tough defender, playing as a centreback or leftback. He considers fellow Sweden national team defender Olof Mellberg to be an inspiration.

Two years later he was sold for €750,000 to Dutch side NEC Nijmegen. While playing in Sweden Olsson was known for his physical play and in 2004 he was the player who picked up the most cautions that year. Playing for NEC Nijmegen evolved his game and the cautions became a thing of the past. Olsson himself says that the Dutch man–man marking approach to defense has improved his game.

He was linked with a move to the Premiership several times with Bolton Wanderers, Middlesbrough, Newcastle United and Everton. Olsson scored three goals in the Eredivisie in 2007–08.

=== West Bromwich Albion ===
On 22 August 2008, Olsson was linked with a move to West Bromwich Albion. On 31 August 2008 West Bromwich Albion confirmed his signing subject to a medical for an initial fee of £800,000 with a possible £360,000 of performance related add ons.

Olsson made his first appearance on 13 September 2008, starting against West Ham United. He scored his first goal for West Brom in a 1–0 win away to Middlesbrough. He went on to get two more goals in the 2008–09 season, coming in the FA Cup against Peterborough and he scored the first goal in West Brom's 3–0 win over Sunderland on 25 April 2009.

The 2009-10 season saw a number of high-profile departures from the club following their relegation from the Premier League, including manager Tony Mowbray, club captain Jonathan Greening and the long-serving Paul Robinson. New West Brom manager Roberto Di Matteo made Olsson the club's new vice-captain as they prepared for a season in the Championship. In a match against Doncaster Rovers on 15 September 2009, Olsson headed two goals. Thirteen days later, he signed a new four-year deal which is set to keep him at the club until 2013. Olsson played a pivotal role as West Brom secured promotion back to the Premier League at the first attempt.

On 23 October 2010, Olsson picked up an Achilles tendon injury during the win over Fulham and was ruled out for up to six weeks. He then made his return to the starting line-up against Blackburn Rovers on 23 January 2011, completing the full 90 minutes, partnering Gabriel Tamas in defence in a 2–0 defeat at Ewood Park. At the end of the 2011–12 season, he made 34 appearances in all competitions, all of which were starting berths.

The 2011-12 season saw Gareth McAuley join West Brom on a free transfer and the two formed a strong partnership throughout the season, playing a major part in the club's highest finish for 30 years in tenth place. Olsson scored in a historic 2-1 win against local rivals Aston Villa in October 2011, helping Albion to their first league win at Villa Park since 1979. In February 2012, Olsson again played a key role in a historic West Brom win, scoring Albion's second goal in a 5-1 demolition of Wolverhampton Wanderers in the Black Country derby at Molineux.

On 6 October 2012, it was announced that Olsson had signed a new four-year contract with West Bromwich Albion, ensuring he would remain with the team until 2016. Olsson continued to feature prominently throughout the 2012–13 and 2013-14 seasons in which time Albion became an established Premier League side following four consecutive seasons in the top flight, the first time the club had achieved this since the 1980s.

The 2014-15 season saw Olsson's first team opportunities limited due to the arrival of 26 time England international Joleon Lescott as well as niggling injuries. The arrival of Tony Pulis saw Olsson temporarily deployed as a makeshift left back, before again falling out of favour. Olsson went on to make just 13 Premier League appearances that season.

Olsson had a bigger impact in the 2015-16 season, making 28 league appearances and scoring 1 goal, which came in a 2-2 draw against Liverpool F.C. at Anfield in December - his last goal for the club. The majority of these appearances however saw Olsson again deployed in a less favoured left back role, with new signing Jonny Evans preferred at centre back alongside Gareth McAuley.

Olsson started in what would prove to be the last of his 261 appearances for West Brom in a 4-0 away defeat to Tottenham Hotspur in January 2017, before his contract was mutually terminated in March. Olsson remains a fan favourite at West Brom and is considered a key figure in the club's prolonged stay in the top flight between 2010 and 2018.

=== Djurgårdens IF ===
In March 2017, Olsson and West Bromwich agreed to a mutual termination of the remainder of Olsson's contract, and he departed Albion after nine years with the club to join Djurgårdens IF, signing a two-year contract. He decided to return to Sweden after facing stiff competition for playing time at West Bromwich, with only 7 club appearances in his final season. His move to Djurgården was part of a string of high-profile acquisitions by the club, which included the return to Djurgården of two of Olsson's former Sweden national team teammates: Kim Källström earlier in the offseason, and Andreas Isaksson the season before. On 10 May 2018 he played as Djurgården beat Malmö FF 3–0 in the Swedish Cup Final.

=== Wigan Athletic ===
On 1 February 2019 Olsson signed a deal with Wigan Athletic that stretches until the end of the season. "I am delighted to be back. I have been missing the UK a lot and I always feel more British than Swedish in a sense," Olsson told the club website. He was released by the club in July 2019.

== International career ==
Olsson was a regular for the Sweden under 21-squad. He was capped 19 times, scoring one goal.

Olsson was included in new coach Erik Hamrén's squad for the friendlies against Bosnia and Herzegovina and Belarus in 2010. He never came off the bench in the match against Bosnia and Herzegovina. The next match against Belarus saw Olsson play from start. On 15 May 2012, 29-year-old Olsson was named in the 23-man squad and handed the number 13 shirt for Euro 2012 held in Poland and Ukraine, along with two other Premier League stars, Blackburn's Martin Olsson and Sunderland's set-piece specialist Sebastian Larsson.

== Television work ==
When Swedish cable network Viasat acquired the broadcasting rights for the 2010–11 Premier League season, the network hired several new television presenters and journalists. Olsson has signed up with Viasat and will appear via satellite link and telephone to provide a players perspective on the matches and the Premier League. He added that this will give him a chance to promote West Bromwich Albion in Sweden. On 15 April 2012, he appeared as a guest pundit on BBC's Match of the Day 2.

== Personal life ==
When not playing football, Olsson enjoys playing the guitar. He lists Bob Dylan, Nirvana, The Rolling Stones, Oasis, Babyshambles, Mando Diao, The Chardogs and The Who as some of his favourite artists.

Olsson has stated that once he is done with his professional football career, he wants to qualify as a lawyer and work within the sphere of human rights. He has already taken introduction classes on the subject in Sweden.

== Career statistics ==
=== Club ===
As of 15 April 2019

| Club | Season | League | | | National Cup | | League Cup | | Other | | Total | |
| Club | Season | Division | Apps | Goals | Apps | Goals | Apps | Goals | Apps | Goals | Apps | Goals |
|---|---|---|---|---|---|---|---|---|---|---|---|---|
| Landskrona BoIS | 2003 | Allsvenskan | 22 | 0 | 0 | 0 | — | | — | | 22 | 0 |
| Landskrona BoIS | 2004 | Allsvenskan | 22 | 1 | 2 | 0 | — | | — | | 24 | 1 |
| Landskrona BoIS | 2005 | Allsvenskan | 12 | 0 | 2 | 0 | — | | — | | 14 | 0 |
| Landskrona BoIS | Total | | 56 | 1 | 4 | 0 | — | | — | | 60 | 1 |
| NEC Nijmegen | 2005–06 | Eredivisie | 34 | 0 | 2 | 1 | — | | 2 | 0 | 38 | 1 |
| NEC Nijmegen | 2006–07 | Eredivisie | 32 | 2 | 2 | 0 | — | | 3 (Note: Appearances in Eredivisie UEFA Intertoto Cup play-offs) | 0 | 37 | 2 |
| NEC Nijmegen | 2007–08 | Eredivisie | 27 | 3 | 2 | 0 | — | | 5 (Note: Appearances in Eredivisie UEFA Cup play-offs) | 2 | 34 | 5 |
| NEC Nijmegen | Total | | 93 | 5 | 6 | 1 | — | | 10 | 2 | 109 | 8 |
| West Bromwich Albion | 2008–09 | Premier League | 28 | 2 | 1 | 1 | 0 | 0 | — | | 29 | 3 |
| West Bromwich Albion | 2009–10 | Championship | 43 | 4 | 3 | 1 | 2 | 0 | — | | 48 | 5 |
| West Bromwich Albion | 2010–11 | Premier League | 24 | 1 | 1 | 0 | 0 | 0 | — | | 25 | 1 |
| West Bromwich Albion | 2011–12 | Premier League | 33 | 2 | 0 | 0 | 1 | 0 | — | | 34 | 2 |
| West Bromwich Albion | 2012–13 | Premier League | 36 | 0 | 0 | 0 | 1 | 0 | — | | 37 | 0 |
| West Bromwich Albion | 2013–14 | Premier League | 32 | 1 | 0 | 0 | 0 | 0 | — | | 32 | 1 |
| West Bromwich Albion | 2014–15 | Premier League | 13 | 1 | 1 | 0 | 1 | 0 | — | | 15 | 1 |
| West Bromwich Albion | 2015–16 | Premier League | 28 | 1 | 2 | 0 | 2 | 0 | — | | 32 | 1 |
| West Bromwich Albion | 2016–17 | Premier League | 7 | 0 | 1 | 0 | 1 | 0 | — | | 9 | 0 |
| West Bromwich Albion | Total | | 244 | 12 | 9 | 2 | 8 | 0 | — | | 261 | 14 |
| Djurgårdens IF | 2017 | Allsvenskan | 22 | 3 | 0 | 0 | — | | — | | 22 | 3 |
| Djurgårdens IF | 2018 | Allsvenskan | 19 | 0 | 6 | 0 | — | | 2 (Note: Appearances in UEFA Europa League) | 0 | 27 | 0 |
| Djurgårdens IF | Total | | 41 | 3 | 6 | 0 | — | | 2 | 0 | 49 | 3 |
| Wigan Athletic | 2018–19 | Championship | 6 | 0 | — | | — | | — | | 6 | 0 |
| Career total | | | 440 | 21 | 25 | 3 | 8 | 0 | 12 | 2 | 485 | 26 |

=== International ===
International appearances and goals per year

| National team | Year | Apps | Goals |
|---|---|---|---|
| Sweden | 2010 | 1 | 0 |
| Sweden | 2011 | 4 | 0 |
| Sweden | 2012 | 11 | 0 |
| Sweden | 2013 | 8 | 1 |
| Sweden | 2014 | 0 | 0 |
| Sweden | 2015 | 1 | 0 |
| Total | | 25 | 1 |

International goals

| # | Date | Venue | Opponent | Score | Result | Competition |
|---|---|---|---|---|---|---|
| 1. | 6 February 2013 | Friends Arena, Solna, Sweden | Argentina | 1–1 | 2–3 | Friendly |

== Honours ==
Djurgårdens IF

- Svenska Cupen: 2017–18

Sporting positions
| Preceded by (Netherlands) Romano Denneboom | NEC Man of the Year; 2006–2007 | Succeeded by (Morocco) Youssef El-Akchaoui |
