= Luke Moore =

English footballer (born 1986)

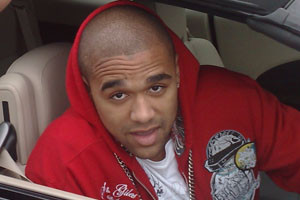
- Moore in 2007

Personal information
- Full name: Luke Isaac Moore
- Date of birth: 13 February 1986 (age 40)
- Place of birth: Birmingham, England
- Height: 5 ft 11 in (1.80 m)
- Position: Striker

Youth career
- ?–2003: Aston Villa

Senior career*
Years	Team	Apps	(Gls)
2003–2008	Aston Villa	87	(14)
2003–2004	→ Wycombe Wanderers (loan)	6	(4)
2008	→ West Bromwich Albion (loan)	10	(0)
2008–2011	West Bromwich Albion	47	(5)
2010	→ Derby County (loan)	13	(4)
2011–2013	Swansea City	55	(8)
2013–2014	Elazığspor	17	(0)
2014	Chivas USA	6	(0)
2014–2016	Toronto FC	42	(7)
Total		283	(42)

International career
2001	England U16	5	(3)
2002–2003	England U17	10	(2)
2005	England U21	5	(0)
- * Club domestic league appearances and goals

Luke Isaac Moore (born 13 February 1986) is an English former professional footballer who played as a striker. He represented England at England U21 level. He is the younger brother of former professional footballer Stefan Moore and uncle to footballer Kobei Moore.

== Club career ==
=== Aston Villa ===
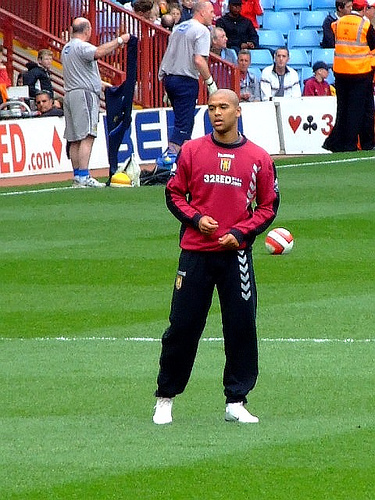
Moore warming up for a game during his time at Aston Villa

As a youngster, Moore played for Romulus and Tame Valley Primary School. As a member of Aston Villa's youth academy, he was prohibited from appearing for his secondary school, Hodge Hill college, but nevertheless appeared in "a couple of cup games" for the school. Moore is the younger brother of the former Queens Park Rangers and Aston Villa striker Stefan Moore. Together they were a crucial part of the Villa FA Youth Cup winning team of 2002. In April 2002, Moore moved onto YTS status and then in February 2004, he signed his professional contract with the club.

In December 2003, Moore was loaned to Wycombe Wanderers, who had failed in their approach for him earlier in the season. He made his Wycombe Wanderers début in a 1–1 draw against Notts County on 13 December 2003. Moore only had to wait until his next game, against AFC Bournemouth to score his début goal in a 2–0 victory. On 3 January 2004, he scored his first career hat-trick in a 4–1 home win over Grimsby Town. His loan spell at Wycombe Wanderers ended shortly after.

Upon his return to Aston Villa, Moore made his first-team debut, as a substitute in a 2–2 draw against Birmingham City. At the start of the 2004–05 season, he made his first appearance of the season, coming on as a late substitute, in a 2–0 win against Southampton in the opening game of the season. Since then, Moore found himself in and out of the starting line–up in the first team, as he found himself in a competition with Juan Pablo Ángel, Carlton Cole and Darius Vassell over the striker position. As a result, Moore appeared in the first team, mostly coming on as a substitute. On 5 February 2005, when Moore made his first starts for Aston Villa and played the whole game, as they lost 3–1 against Arsenal. His first senior goal for Villa came in the 2–0 victory against Middlesbrough on 5 March 2005. At the end of the 2004–05 season, he went on to make twenty–two appearances and scoring once in all competitions. Shortly after, Moore signed a contract extension with the club, signing a three–year contract with a 12-month option extension.

Ahead of the 2005–06 season, Moore made an impression in the club's pre–season tour, including scoring six times in a 14–0 win against Gällstads on 20 July 2005. Despite Villa signing additional forwards such as Kevin Phillips and Milan Baroš in the summer of 2005, Moore kept his place in the first-team squad, starting some games and coming on from the bench in others. The departure of Phillips and the injury to Baroš ensured his place as a starter for the first team at the beginning of the Premiership season. He then scored his first goal of the season, in a 2–1 loss against Chelsea on 24 September 2005. As a result, Moore became the first player to breach Chelsea's defence this season, leading to earn £10,000 and gave it to a local charity of his choosing. This was followed up by scoring his second goal of the season, in a 3–2 loss against Middlesbrough. Two months later on 28 December 2005, he scored his third goal of the season, in a 3–3 draw against Fulham. Moore then scored an equalising goal, in a 1–1 draw against Chelsea on 1 February 2006. Three days later on 4 February 2006, Moore scored his first Premiership hat-trick for Villa, again against Middlesbrough. A week later on 11 February 2006, he scored his eighth goal of the season, in a 2–1 loss against Newcastle United. His performance in a number of matches earned praise from his teammates and Manager David O'Leary. However, towards the end of the 2005–06 season, Moore lost his first team place and was placed at the reserve side. Despite this, his eight league goals have played a crucial part but only because of injuries to Villa's senior strikers and went on to make thirty–two appearances in all competitions.

Ahead of the 2006–07 season, Moore faced uncertainty over his future at Aston Villa following a new ownership. Eventually, his future at the club was resolved following talks with new Manager Martin O'Neill. He scored his first goal of the season, in a 2–0 win against Newcastle United on 27 August 2007. Moore then scored his second goal of the season, in a 2–0 victory over Charlton Athletic on 23 September 2006. At the start of the 2006–07 season, he was featured in the first team for the first eight matches of the season. Moore sustained a serious injury to his right shoulder in a game against Chelsea, an injury which had been persistent during his career. Moore travelled to the US to undergo surgery in October 2006, with Cleveland Browns' head team physician Anthony Miniaci carrying out the procedure, following advice from Aston Villa chairman Randy Lerner. After spending three months on the sidelines, he returned from injury, playing in a behind close door match against Walsall on 24 January 2007. Following this, Moore appeared in a handful matches in the club's reserve to regain his fitness. He even rejected a loan move to a Championship club, preferring to regain his fitness at the club's reserve side instead. Moore returned from his shoulder injury on 9 April 2007, coming on as a substitute for Shaun Maloney against Wigan Athletic at Villa Park. On 14 April 2007, having again come on as a substitute, he scored with a header in a 3–1 win against Middlesbrough at the Riverside Stadium. Moore came on against Bolton Wanderers in the last Villa game of the season to equalise in the 83rd minute, earning Villa a draw. At the end of the 2006–07 season, he went on to make fourteen appearances and scoring four times in all competitions.

Ahead of the 2007–08 season, Moore was linked a move away from Aston Villa, with clubs around England interested in signing him. Amid the transfer speculation, he scored a hat trick for Aston Villa in the friendly match with Toronto FC on 25 July 2007. Three days later on 28 July 2007, Moore scored in a follow–up match, in a 3–1 win against Columbus Crew. His performance earned praise from Manager O'Neill. He continued to be featured in and out of the starting eleven for the side, mostly coming from the substitute bench. Despite this, Moore scored his first goal of the season, in a 5–0 win against Wrexham in the second round of the League Cup. Two months later on 28 October 2007, he scored his second goal of the season, in a 1–1 draw against Bolton Wanderers. However, Moore's poor performance led him to be dropped from the first team, as well as, his own injury concern. As a result, he was expected to leave West Bromwich Albion despite having his contract option taken up by Aston Villa. By the time he departed from the club, Moore went on to make fifteen appearances and scoring two times in all competitions.

=== West Bromwich Albion ===
In January 2008, Villa manager Martin O'Neill revealed that Rangers manager Walter Smith had contacted him about possibly signing Moore. O'Neill quoted Rangers with a price of £3.5 million for Moore. A month later on 22 February, Moore joined rivals West Bromwich Albion on loan until the end of the season, signing a deal to join permanently for £3.5 million in the summer of 2008.

Moore made his Albion debut on 23 February 2008, coming on as a second-half substitute in a 2–1 home defeat to Hull City. He received the first red card of his career in a 4–1 home defeat to Leicester City on 15 March 2008. Despite being suspended, Moore was featured in and out of the starting eleven for the side, mostly coming on from the substitute bench. West Bromwich Albion was promoted to the Premier league after beating Queens Park Rangers 2–0 in the last game of the season. At the end of the 2007–08 season, he went on to make ten appearances in all competitions.

On 28 May 2008, Moore completed his transfer to the newly promoted Premiership side for a fee of £3 million. Ahead of the 2008–09 season, he was challenged by Manager Tony Mowbray to fight his way to the first team. However at the start of the 2008–09 season, he suffered a thigh injury that kept him out for two weeks. Moore's first game after signing for the club on a permanent basis came on 26 August 2008 against Hartlepool United in the second round of the League Cup, starting the whole game, in a 3–1 loss. Since returning from injury, he found himself in and out of the starting line–up, mostly coming on from the substitute bench and his form struggled. As a result, local newspaper Birmingham Mail branded both Scott Carson and Moore as "miserable pair" from Aston Villa, due to "becoming the on-pitch jokers" in the club's recent matches. He then scored his first goal for West Brom on 21 December 2008 against Manchester City. Despite earning support from his teammates to regain his goal scoring form, Moore failed to exceed expectations and found himself in a sidelined, including another thigh injury. Eventually, the club was relegated to the Championship after losing 2–0 against Liverpool on 17 May 2009. At the end of the 2008–09 season, he went on to make twenty–three appearances and scoring once in all competitions.

Ahead of the 2009–10 Championship season, Moore was allowed to leave the club following his performance last season. But he quickly impressed Manager Roberto Di Matteo, scoring three times in the club's pre–season friendly matches. In the opening game of the season against Newcastle United, Moore set up the opening goal for Shelton Martis, in a 1–1 draw. A week later on 18 August 2009, he opened his account with a brace in the 3–2 victory at Peterborough United. Since the start of the 2009–10 season, Moore regained his first team place under the management of Di Matteo and formed a partnership with Simon Cox. Despite suffering injuries on two occasions in September, he managed to score his third goal of the season, as well as, setting up two goals, in a 5–0 win against Watford on 31 October 2009. Moore soon became a subject of chant from West Bromwich Albion's supporters over his goal scoring form. Two months later on 26 December 2009, he scored his fourth goal of the season, in a 2–0 win against Peterborough United. However, Moore's scoring record after was poor in the second half of the season that he was subjected of booing by the club's supporters. As a result, Moore was demoted to the substitute bench for the rest of the 2009–10 season. Despite this, the club was promoted back to the Premier League after beating Doncaster Rovers 3–2 on 10 April 2010. At the end of the 2009–10 season, he went on to make twenty–nine appearances and scoring four times in all competitions.

Ahead of the 2010–11 season, it was widely expected that he would leave West Bromwich Albion during the 2010 summer transfer window. Amid to his future at the club, he made one appearance for the side, which came in a 2–0 win against Leyton Orient in the first round of the League Cup, which was his only appearance of the season for West Bromwich Albion. Upon leaving West Bromwich Albion, the club's chairman Jeremy Peace said he regretted signing Moore for paying a big transfer fee.

==== Derby County (loan) ====
On 1 September 2010, Moore was not included in West Bromwich Albion's 25-man squad for the new season therefore deeming him surplus to requirements at the Hawthorns, a move which saw him join Football League Championship side Derby County later that same month on a 29-day loan deal.

Moore made his Derby County debut on 25 September 2010 against Crystal Palace, coming on as 74th-minute substitute, in a 5–0 win. Moore was primarily used as a substitute in at the start of his spell at The Rams, three of his four appearances coming as substitute, but impressed enough for Derby boss Nigel Clough to want to extent his spell at Pride Park. The same day as Clough announced his desire to retain Moore's services, he scored his first goal for the club, on his second start, with the opener in a 3–2 victory at Doncaster Rovers. The next week, it was announced his Derby loan had been extended for a further month, the loan was further extended to the end of December.

Moore later scored two goals in two matches on 20 November 2010 and 27 November 2010 against Scunthorpe United and Burnley. Derby manager Nigel Clough was keen to extend his loan until the end of the season in December, but after scoring in a 5–2 defeat against Nottingham Forest in the East Midlands derby game at the City Ground, Moore returned to West Brom stating that he wanted to keep his options open for the January transfer window. Moore scored 4 times in 13 league appearances for The Rams of which 9 were starts.

=== Swansea City ===
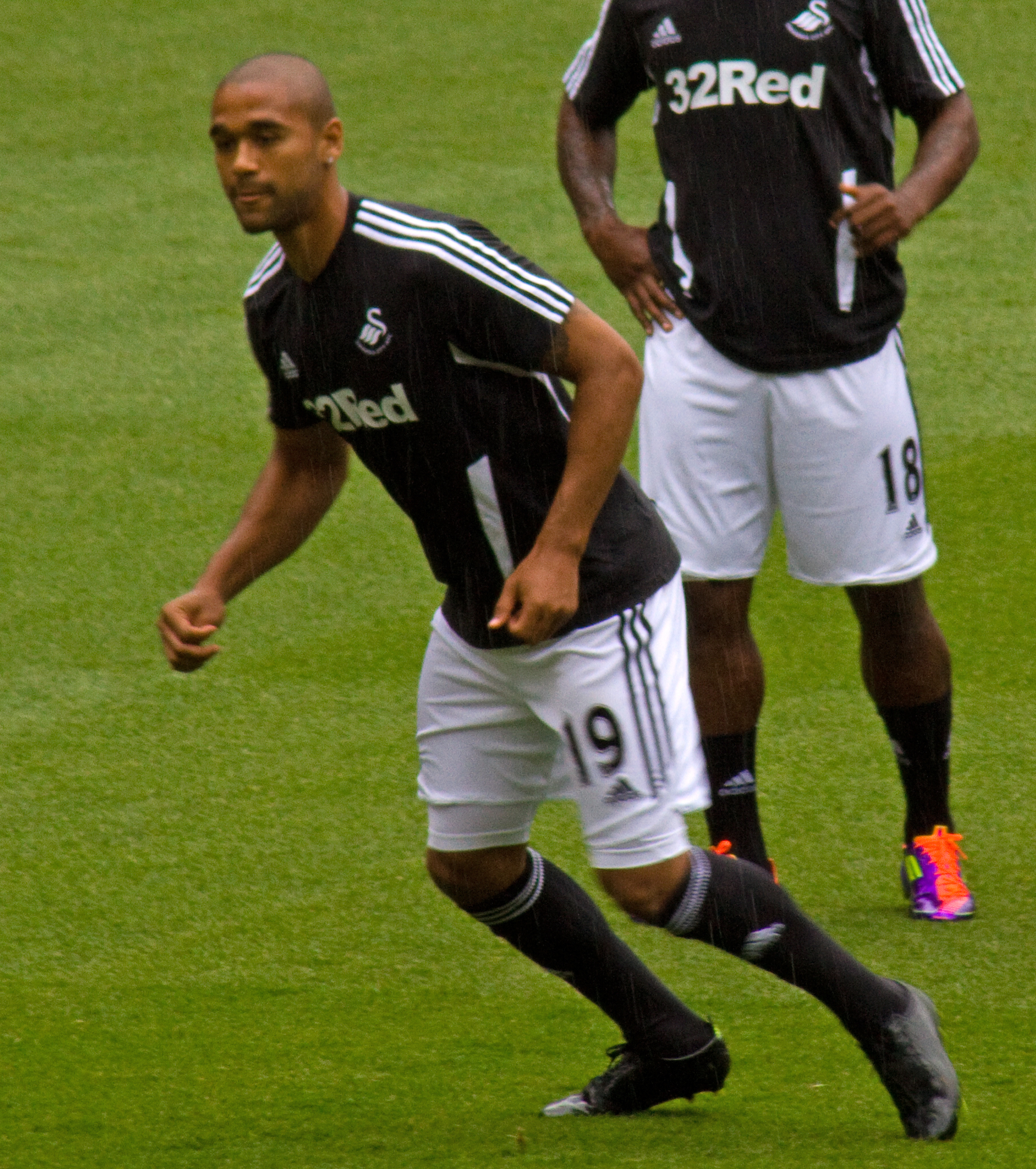
Moore warming up in a match against Arsenal in 2011

After a frustrating spell at West Bromwich Albion, Moore signed for Swansea City on a two-and-a-half-year deal on 7 January 2011 for an undisclosed fee rumoured to be a free transfer. Upon joining the club, he said that he was motivated to work under Brendan Rodgers.

Moore made his debut against Colchester United on 8 January 2011 in the FA Cup. Since making his debut for the club, he quickly became involves in the first team, playing in the striker position. Moore scored his first goal for Swansea in a home victory against Doncaster Rovers on 19 February 2011, which was followed up by his second Swansea goal came in a 3–0 win over Leeds United on 26 February 2011. However, he lost his first team place following the arrival of Tamás Priskin and Fabio Borini, resulting in his playing time coming on from the substitute bench for the rest of the season. A month later on 25 April 2011, Moore scored his third goal of the season, as well as, setting up one of the goals, in a 4–1 win against Ipswich Town. He was involved in three matches in the play-offs, as Swansea City was promoted to the Premier League. At the end of the 2010–11 season, Moore went on to make thirteen appearances and scoring four times.

At the start of the 2011–12 season, Moore made his first appearance of the season, starting the whole game, in a 3–1 loss against Shrewsbury Town in the second round of the EFL Cup. However, he found his first team opportunity limited, just making four appearances in the first half of the season. Moore then scored his first goal of the season, on 3 December 2011, in a 4–2 loss against Blackburn Rovers. He continued to receive his playing time, mostly coming from the substitute bench. Moore scored his second goal of the season, in a 2–1 loss against Bolton Wanderers in the fourth round of the FA Cup. He then scored a late goal against Manchester City which was the winning goal on 11 March 2012 in a 1–0 victory. That result knocked Man City down to second place due to Manchester United 2–0 win over West Brom. After the match, Moore praised Wayne Routledge's performance and contribution for his assist, leading him to score with a header. Eventually, the club avoided relegation following a 4–4 draw against Wolverhampton Wanderers on 28 April 2012. At the end of the 2011–12 season, he went on to make twenty–two appearances and scoring three times in all competitions.

At the start of the 2012–13 season, Moore started the season well when he scored twice, as well as, setting up one of the club's first goal of the game, in a 3–1 win against Barnsley in the first round of the League Cup campaign. Moore then set up a goal for Routledge to score the club's second goal of the game, in a 2–2 draw against Reading on 6 October 2012. However, under the new management of Michael Laudrup, Moore's first team opportunities continued to be limited. In order to get playing time, Moore was linked with a loan move to Blackburn Rovers, which never happened. From 2 March 2013, Moore scored three goals against Newcastle United, West Brom and Norwich City earned praise from Laudrup, mentioning his confidence. At the end of the 2012–13 season, he went on to make nineteen appearances and scoring five times in all competitions.

On 23 August 2013, Swansea City confirmed that Moore's contract had been terminated by mutual consent, ending his three-years at the club. Moore previously stated that he was ready to leave Swansea City after he was left out of their pre-season tour of the Netherlands.

=== Elazığspor ===
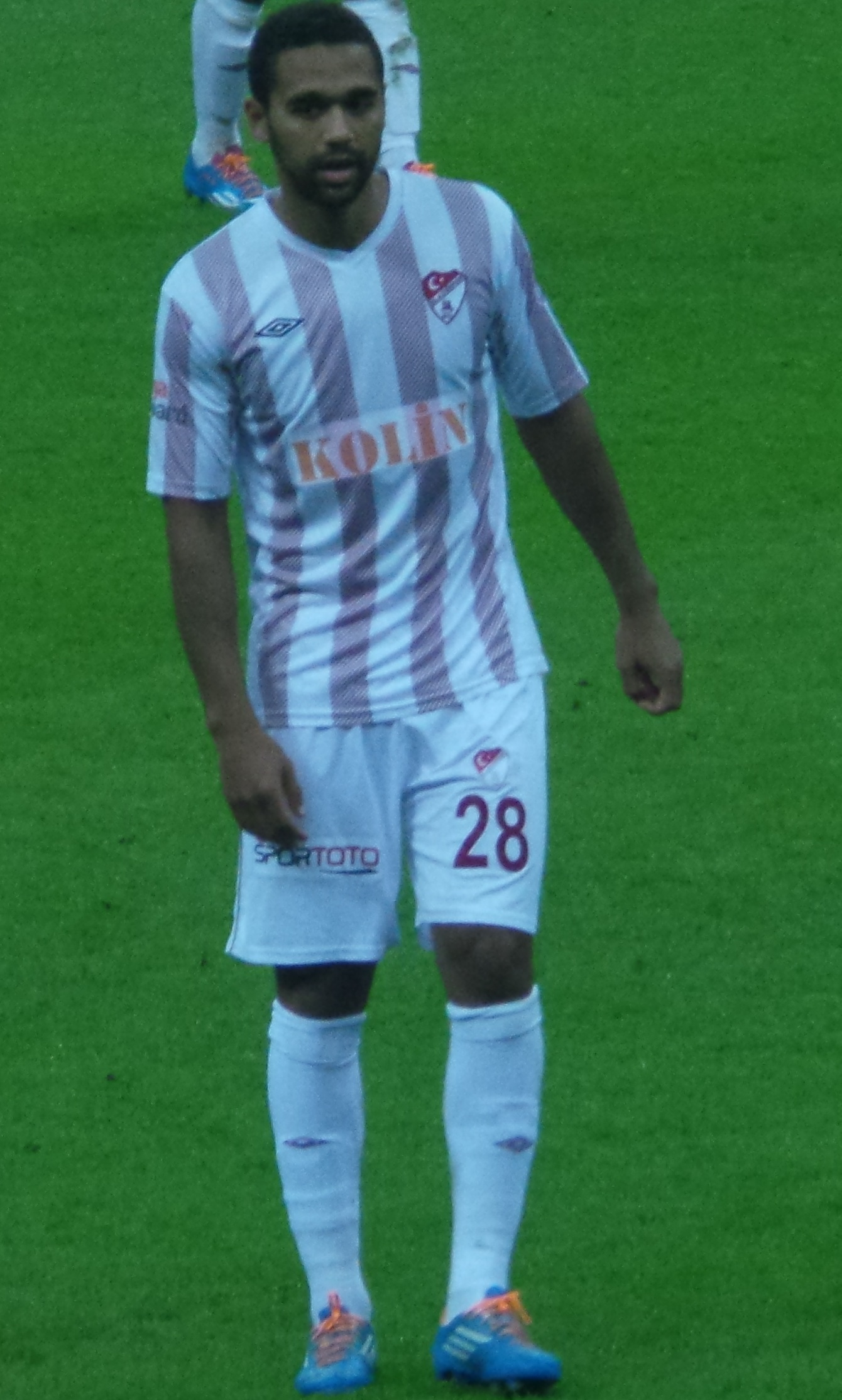
Moore playing for Elazığspor in 2013.

Shortly after leaving Swansea City, Moore joined Turkish club Elazığspor on a free transfer on 24 August 2013, on a three-year contract and moving abroad for the first time in his career. Upon joining the club, he said: "As a team, we aim to perform better than our performance last year. I want to contribute to the team with my personal skills and efforts. I am extremely happy to be in Turkey. I always wanted to play abroad. There gratifying for me in Turkey."

Moore made his Elazığspor debut, coming on as an 83rd-minute substitute, in a 2–2 draw against Kardemir Karabükspor on 25 August 2013. In January 2014, Moore's agent Peter Morrison revealed that he may be able to leave Elazığspor on a free transfer due to a problem regarding financial obligations. By the time he departed from the club, Moore made seventeen appearances and scored no goals for the side. After leaving Elazığspor, he was linked with a return to England, with clubs like Leeds United believed to be interested.

=== MLS ===
On 24 February 2014, it was announced that Moore had agreed to join Chivas USA, for the 2014 MLS season. He made his Chivas USA debut, coming on as 79th-minute substitute, in a 3–2 win against Chicago Fire in the opening game of the season. Moore went on to make six appearances for the side.

Moore was traded to the Colorado Rapids on 8 May for Marvin Chávez who in turn traded Moore to Toronto FC for Gale Agbossoumonde. He scored in his league debut with the team in a win against New York Red Bulls on 17 May after coming on as a sub in the 56th minute for Gilberto Oliveira Souza Júnior. This was followed up with his second goal of the season, in a 2–2 draw against Sporting Kansas City. However, during a 1–1 draw against Chicago Fire on 2 July 2014, he was sent–off in the 29th minute after "a mid-air collision with Fire midfielder Chris Ritter". Three days later on 5 July 2014, Moore scored his third goal for the club, in a 2–1 loss against D.C. United. A month later, he scored two goals in two matches between 2 August 2014 and 10 August 2014 against Montreal Impact and Columbus Crew. Moore then scored his sixth goal of the season on 21 September 2014, in a 3–0 win against Chivas USA. At the end of the 2014 season, Moore went on to make twenty–nine appearances and scoring six times in all competitions.

At the start of the 2015 season, Moore found himself placed on the substitute bench in a number of matches. However, he served a one match suspension for a serious foul play during a 2–1 loss against Real Salt Lake on 29 March 2015. Moore then set up a goal for Sebastian Giovinco to score the only goal of the game, in a 1–0 win against Portland Timbers on 23 May 2015. Six days later on 29 May 2015, he scored his first goal of the season, as well as, setting up the club's second goal of the game, in a 3–1 win against San Jose Earthquakes. Moore set up a goal for Giovinco, who went on to score twice in the match, winning 2–1 against D.C. United on 6 June 2015. However, he found his first team opportunities limited later in the 2015 season, due to being on the substitute bench and faced his own injury concern. On 6 September 2015, Moore returned from injury, starting the whole game, in a 2–1 loss against Seattle Sounders FC. At the end of the 2015 season, he went on to make seventeen appearances and scoring once in all competitions.

He was placed on waivers by Toronto FC on 26 February 2016 after spending two seasons with the club. Following this, Moore retired from professional football before turning 30. He since returned to Birmingham with his young son and became a football agent.

== International career ==
Having previously been called up for England U19, Moore was called up to the England U21 for the first time in March 2005. On 7 October 2005, he made his England U21 debut, coming on as a 60th-minute substitute, in a 2–1 loss against Austria U21. Moore went on to make five appearances in total for England U21.

== Career statistics ==
Appearances and goals by club, season and competition
Club	Season	League			National cup (Note: Includes FA Cup, Turkish Cup, Lamar Hunt US Open Cup, Canadian Championship.)		League cup (Note: Includes Football League Cup, MLS Cup Playoffs.)		Other		Total	
Club	Season	Division	Apps	Goals	Apps	Goals	Apps	Goals	Apps	Goals	Apps	Goals
Aston Villa	2003–04	Premier League	7	0	—		—		—		7	0
Aston Villa	2004–05	Premier League	25	1	1	0	1	0	—		27	1
Aston Villa	2005–06	Premier League	27	8	3	0	2	0	—		32	8
Aston Villa	2006–07	Premier League	13	4	—		1	0	—		14	4
Aston Villa	2007–08	Premier League	15	1	1	0	2	1	—		18	2
Wycombe Wanderers (loan)	2003–04	Second Division	6	3	—		—		—		6	3
West Bromwich Albion (loan)	2007–08	Championship	10	0	—		—		—		10	0
West Bromwich Albion	2008–09	Premier League	21	1	1	0	1	0	—		23	1
West Bromwich Albion	2009–10	Championship	26	4	2	0	1	0	—		29	4
West Bromwich Albion	2010–11	Premier League	—		—		1	0	—		1	0
Derby County (loan)	2010–11	Championship	13	4	—		—		—		13	4
Swansea City	2010–11	Championship	15	3	2	0	—		3 (Note: Includes three 2010–11 Football League Championship play-off appearances.)	0	20	3
Swansea City	2011–12	Premier League	20	2	1	1	1	0	—		22	3
Swansea City	2012–13	Premier League	17	3	0	0	3	2	—		20	5
Elazığspor	2013–14	Süper Lig	14	0	3	0	—		—		17	0
Chivas USA	2014	Major League Soccer	6	0	0	0	0	0	—		6	0
Toronto FC	2014	Major League Soccer	27	6	2	0	0	0	—		29	6
Toronto FC	2015	Major League Soccer	15	1	2	0	0	0	—		17	1
Career total			277	41	18	1	13	3	3	0	311	45

== Honours ==
Aston Villa Youth

- FA Youth Cup: 2001–02

Swansea City

- Football League Championship play-offs: 2011
- Football League Cup: 2012–13
