= 2012–13 FC Twente season =

Twente
2012–13 season
- Chairman: Joop Munsterman
- Manager: Steve McClaren; Until 26 February 2013; Alfred Schreuder (caretaker); 26 February 2013 - April 2013; Michel Jansen (caretaker); From April 2013
- Eredivisie: 6th
- KNVB Cup: Third round vs Den Bosch
- Europa League: Group stage
- Top goalscorer: League: Luc Castaignos (13); All: Nacer Chadli (16)

The 2012–13 FC Twente season was spent in the Eredivisie.

== Squad ==
As of 26 April 2013

Note: Flags indicate national team as defined under FIFA eligibility rules; some limited exceptions apply. Players may hold more than one non-FIFA nationality.

No.	Pos.	Nation	Player
1	GK	NED	Sander Boschker
2	DF	DEN	Andreas Bjelland
4	DF	NED	Peter Wisgerhof (captain)
5	DF	NED	Robbert Schilder
6	MF	NED	Wout Brama (vice captain)
7	MF	NED	Denny Landzaat
8	MF	NED	Leroy Fer
9	FW	RUS	Dmitry Bulykin
10	FW	SRB	Dušan Tadić
11	FW	NED	Jerson Cabral
13	GK	BUL	Nikolay Mihailov
14	MF	NED	Willem Janssen
15	DF	VEN	Roberto Rosales

No.	Pos.	Nation	Player
16	DF	NED	Tim Breukers
17	DF	SWE	Rasmus Bengtsson
19	DF	NED	Douglas
20	DF	NED	Edson Braafheid (on loan from 1899 Hoffenheim)
21	MF	CHI	Felipe Gutiérrez
22	FW	BEL	Nacer Chadli
25	GK	POR	Daniel Fernandes
30	FW	NED	Luc Castaignos
37	FW	GER	Tim Hölscher
39	MF	NED	Joey Pelupessy
45	FW	NED	Edwin Gyasi

=== Out on loan ===
Note: Flags indicate national team as defined under FIFA eligibility rules; some limited exceptions apply. Players may hold more than one non-FIFA nationality.

No.	Pos.	Nation	Player
—	GK	NED	Nick Marsman (at Go Ahead Eagles until 30 June 2013)
—	DF	NED	Thijs Bouma (at (Germany) VfL Osnabrück until 30 June 2013)
—	DF	NED	Nicky Kuiper (at (Greece) Panathinaikos until 30 June 2013)
—	DF	GER	Nils Röseler (at VVV-Venlo until 30 June 2013)
—	MF	SWE	Emir Bajrami (at (France) Monaco until 30 June 2013)
—	MF	NED	Jurjan Mannes (at Fortuna Sittard until 30 June 2013)

No.	Pos.	Nation	Player
—	MF	GER	Thilo Leugers (at NAC Breda until 30 June 2013)
—	MF	NED	Quincy Promes (at Go Ahead Eagles until 30 June 2013)
—	FW	NED	Joshua John (at (Denmark) Nordsjælland until 30 June 2013)
—	FW	NED	Cas Peters (at Go Ahead Eagles until 30 June 2013)
—	FW	NED	Glynor Plet (at (Belgium) Genk until 30 June 2013)

=== UEFA List B ===
Note: Flags indicate national team as defined under FIFA eligibility rules; some limited exceptions apply. Players may hold more than one non-FIFA nationality.

No.	Pos.	Nation	Player
35	GK	POL	Filip Bednarek
38	FW	GER	Mirco Born
39	DF	NED	Joey Pelupessy
40	GK	NED	Wouter Dronkers

No.	Pos.	Nation	Player
41	DF	NED	Coen Gortemaker
42	MF	NED	Abdul Nury
43	DF	NED	Mark Engberink
44	MF	GER	Kris Fillinger

== Transfers ==
=== Summer ===
In: Note: Flags indicate national team as defined under FIFA eligibility rules; some limited exceptions apply. Players may hold more than one non-FIFA nationality.

No.	Pos.	Nation	Player
2	DF	DEN	Andreas Bjelland (from (Denmark) Nordsjælland)
5	DF	NED	Robbert Schilder (from (Netherlands) NAC Breda)
9	FW	RUS	Dmitri Bulykin (from (Netherlands) Ajax)
10	FW	SRB	Dušan Tadić (from (Netherlands) Groningen)
11	FW	NED	Jerson Cabral (from (Netherlands) Feyenoord)
16	DF	NED	Tim Breukers (from (Netherlands) Heracles)
18	DF	BEL	Dedryck Boyata (loan from (England) Manchester City)
20	DF	NED	Edson Braafheid (loan from (Germany) 1899 Hoffenheim)
21	MF	CHI	Felipe Gutiérrez (from (Chile) Universidad Catolica)
30	FW	NED	Luc Castaignos (from (Italy) Internazionale)
45	FW	NED	Edwin Gyasi (from (Netherlands) De Graafschap)

Out: Note: Flags indicate national team as defined under FIFA eligibility rules; some limited exceptions apply. Players may hold more than one non-FIFA nationality.

No.	Pos.	Nation	Player
9	FW	NED	Luuk de Jong (to (Germany) Borussia Mönchengladbach)
10	FW	NED	Glynor Plet (loan to (Belgium) Genk)
11	MF	SWE	Emir Bajrami (loan to (France) Monaco)
12	FW	NED	Wesley Verhoek (to (Netherlands) Feyenoord)
16	GK	NED	Nick Marsman (loan to (Netherlands) Go Ahead Eagles)
18	MF	GER	Thilo Leugers (loan to (Netherlands) NAC Breda)
23	DF	BEL	Bart Buysse (to (Belgium) Club Brugge)
24	FW	NED	Ola John (to (Portugal) Benfica)
26	FW	NED	Joshua John (loan to (Denmark) Nordsjælland)
31	DF	GER	Nils Röseler (loan to (Netherlands) VVV-Venlo)
—	DF	FIN	Tuomas Rannankari (to (Germany) Greuther Fürth)
—	MF	NED	Steven Berghuis (to (Netherlands) AZ)
—	MF	NED	Alexander Bannink (loan to (Netherlands) Emmen)

=== Winter ===
In: Note: Flags indicate national team as defined under FIFA eligibility rules; some limited exceptions apply. Players may hold more than one non-FIFA nationality.

No.	Pos.	Nation	Player

Out: Note: Flags indicate national team as defined under FIFA eligibility rules; some limited exceptions apply. Players may hold more than one non-FIFA nationality.

No.	Pos.	Nation	Player
3	DF	NED	Nicky Kuiper (loan to (Greece) Panathinaikos)
12	DF	NED	Tim Cornelisse (loan to (Netherlands) Willem II)
18	DF	BEL	Dedryck Boyata (loan return to (England) Manchester City)

== Competitions ==
=== Eredivisie ===
==== Results summary ====
Overall								Home						Away					
Pld	W	D	L	GF	GA	GD	Pts	W	D	L	GF	GA	GD	W	D	L	GF	GA	GD
34	17	11	6	60	33	+27	62	10	4	3	33	17	+16	7	7	3	27	16	+11

==== Results by round ====
Round	1	2	3	4	5	6	7	8	9	10	11	12	13	14	15	16	17	18	19	20	21	22	23	24	25	26	27	28	29	30	31	32	33	34
Ground	H	A	A	H	A	H	A	H	A	A	H	A	A	H	H	A	H	A	H	A	H	A	H	A	H	H	A	H	H	A	A	H	A	H
Result	W	W	W	W	W	W	L	W	D	W	W	D	D	D	W	L	W	W	D	D	L	D	D	L	L	L	W	D	W	W	D	W	D	W
Position	1	1	1	1	1	1	1	1	1	1	1	2	2	2	1	3	2	2	1	2	3	4	3	5	5	6	5	5	5	5	5	5	6	6

Updated to match(es) played on 26 May 2013. Source: see below
A = Away; H = Home; W = Win; D = Draw; L = Loss

==== Matches ====
12 August 2012 1	Twente	4–1	FC Groningen	Enschede
14:30 CEST (UTC+2)	Chadli 30', 54'; Tadić 33', 71'	Summary	Magnasco (yellow card) 35'; Bacuna 83'; Van Dijk (yellow card) 90+1'	Stadium: De Grolsch Veste; Attendance: 29,400; Referee: Jan Wegereef

18 August 2012 2	NAC Breda	0–1	Twente	Breda
19:45 CEST (UTC+2)	Lurling (yellow card) 10'; Looms (yellow card) 14'; Eric Fernando Botteghin (yellow card) 30'; Luyckx (yellow card) 67'	Summary	Douglas (yellow card) 31'; Fer 51'; Brama (yellow card) 83'	Stadium: Rat Verlegh Stadion; Attendance: 15,500; Referee: Kevin Blom

26 August 2012 3	N.E.C.	1–3	Twente	Nijmegen
14:30 CEST (UTC+2)	Babos (yellow card) 42'; Sno 77'	Summary	Castaignos 14'; Bulykin 22'; Fer 42' (pen.); Tadić (yellow card) 45'; Gutiérrez (yellow card) 62'; Janssen (yellow card) 81'	Stadium: Stadion de Goffert; Attendance: 12,000; Referee: Ruud Bossen

2 September 2012 4	Twente	1–0	VVV-Venlo	Enschede
14:30 CEST (UTC+2)	Fer 90+2' (pen.)	Summary	Vorstermans (yellow card) 22'; Türk (yellow card) 34'; Ammi (yellow card) 83'	Stadium: De Grolsch Veste; Attendance: 29,000; Referee: Ed Janssen

15 September 2012 5	Willem II	2–6	Twente	Tilburg
19:45 CEST (UTC+2)	Mulder (yellow card) 35'; Joachim (yellow card) 55'; Höcher 70'; Lumu 84'	Summary	Rosales (yellow card) 26'; Gutiérrez 39'; Castaignos 42'; Schilder 53', 78'; Janssen 80'; Haastrup 87' (o.g.)	Stadium: Koning Willem II Stadion; Attendance: 10,300; Referee: Jan Wegereef

23 September 2012 6	Twente	1–0	SC Heerenveen	Enschede
14:30 CEST (UTC+2)	Tadić 59' (pen.); Rosales (yellow card) 76'	Summary	Zomer (yellow card) 30'; Gouweleeuw (yellow card) 68'	Stadium: De Grolsch Veste; Attendance: 29,200; Referee: Serdar Gözübüyük

29 September 2012 7	Ajax	1–0	Twente	Amsterdam
20:45 CEST (UTC+2)	Eriksen 68'	Summary	Tadić (yellow card) 45+1'; Brama (yellow card) 86'	Stadium: Amsterdam Arena; Attendance: 50,772; Referee: Pieter Vink

7 October 2012 8	Twente	3–0	AZ	Enschede
16:30 CEST (UTC+2)	Chadli 20'; Rosales (yellow card) 36'; Tadić 60' (pen.); Castaignos 62'	Summary	Gorter (yellow card) 11'; Maher (red card) 51'; Altidore (yellow card) 52' (yellow-red card) 52'	Stadium: De Grolsch Veste; Attendance: 29,500; Referee: Danny Makkelie

20 October 2012 9	Roda JC	1–1	Twente	Kerkrade
19:45 CEST (UTC+2)	Hupperts 73'; Kurto (yellow card) 86'	Summary	Castaignos 68'	Stadium: Parkstad Limburg Stadion; Attendance: 13,212; Referee: Ruud Bossen

28 October 2012 10	RKC Waalwijk	0–1	Twente	Waalwijk
14:30 CET (UTC+1)	Stans (yellow card) 35'	Summary	Janssen (yellow card) 12'; Rosales (yellow card) 21'; Tadić 40'; Chadli (yellow card) 51'	Stadium: Mandemakers Stadion; Attendance: 6,129; Referee: Tom van Sichem

4 November 2012 11	Twente	3–0	Feyenoord	Enschede
14:30 CET (UTC+1)	Chadli 9'; Castaignos 17', (yellow card) 73'; Tadić 78'	Summary	Mathijsen (yellow card) 45'	Stadium: De Grolsch Veste; Attendance: 30,000; Referee: Pieter Vink

11 November 2012 12	Vitesse	0–0	Twente	Arnhem
12:30 CET (UTC+1)	Reis (yellow card) 77'; Bony (yellow card) 81'	Summary	Janssen (yellow card) 17'; Brama (yellow card) 23'	Stadium: GelreDome; Attendance: 18,184; Referee: Kevin Blom

18 November 2012 13	FC Utrecht	1–1	Twente	Utrecht
14:30 CET (UTC+1)	Van der Maarel (yellow card) 4'; Mulenga 17', (yellow card) 87'	Summary	Janssen 2'; Wisgerhof (yellow card) 19'; Braafheid (yellow card) 26'; Rosales (yellow card) 36'	Stadium: Stadion Galgenwaard; Attendance: 20,119; Referee: Danny Makkelie

25 November 2012 14	Twente	2–2	PEC Zwolle	Enschede
16:30 CET (UTC+1)	Tadić 48' (pen.); Braafheid (yellow card) 85'; Castaignos 90+2'	Summary	Boer (yellow card) 43'; Avdić 55'; Broerse (yellow card) 76'; Van den Berg 88'; Van Polen (yellow card) 90+1'	Stadium: De Grolsch Veste; Attendance: 29,500; Referee: Richard Liesveld

1 December 2012 15	Twente	2–0	ADO Den Haag	Enschede
18:45 CET (UTC+1)	Janssen (yellow card) 38'; Tadić 55'; Rosales (yellow card) 57'; Bulykin 83'	[uk.soccerway.com/matches/2012/12/01/netherlands/eredivisie/stichting-fc-twente-65/hfc-ado-den-haag/1290552/ Summary]	Chery (red card) 49'; Poepon (yellow card) 61'	Stadium: De Grolsch Veste; Attendance: 29,300; Referee: Jan Wegereef

9 December 2012 16	PSV	3–0	Twente	Eindhoven
16:30 CET (UTC+1)	Manolev (yellow card) 23'; Wijnaldum 38'; Matavž 80'; Narsingh 82'	Summary	Douglas (yellow card) 9'; Tadić (yellow card) 69'	Stadium: Philips Stadion; Attendance: 34,400; Referee: Pol van Boekel

14 December 2012 17	Twente	3–2	Heracles	Enschede
20:00 CET (UTC+1)	Fer (yellow card) 12'; Chadli 26'; Brama (yellow card) 40'; Gyasi 62'; Castaignos 70'	[uk.soccerway.com/matches/2012/12/14/netherlands/eredivisie/stichting-fc-twente-65/stichting-heracles-almelo/1290564/ Summary]	Quansah (yellow card) 6'; Duarte (yellow card) 15'; Vejinović 20'; Koenders (yellow card) 43'; Rienstra (yellow card) 59'; Bruns 64'	Stadium: De Grolsch Veste; Attendance: 29,800; Referee: Eric Braamhaar

21 December 2012 18	AZ	0–3	Twente	Alkmaar
20:00 CET (UTC+1)	Reijnen (yellow card) 48'	Summary	Chadli 47', 82'; Castaignos 75'; Tadić (yellow card) 86'	Stadium: AFAS Stadion; Attendance: 16,556; Referee: Richard Liesveld

19 January 2013 19	Twente	0–0	RKC Waalwijk	Enschede
19:45 CET (UTC+1)		Summary	Van Peppen (yellow card) 54'; Martina (yellow card) 62'	Stadium: De Grolsch Veste; Attendance: 29,300; Referee: Ruud Bossen

27 January 2013 20	Feyenoord	0–0	Twente	Rotterdam
14:30 CET (UTC+1)	Clasie (yellow card) 18'; Immers (yellow card) 48'; Vilhena (yellow card) 73'	Summary	Rosales (yellow card) 31'; Douglas (yellow card) 44'; Fer (yellow card) 75'; Schilder (yellow card) 90'	Stadium: De Kuip; Attendance: 47,500; Referee: Pieter Vink

3 February 2013 21	Twente	2–4	FC Utrecht	Enschede
14:30 CET (UTC+1)	Bengtsson (red card) 44'; Tadić 56', 73' (pen.); Brama (yellow card) 68'	Summary	Toornstra 32', (yellow card) 70'; Mulenga 45+1' (pen.); Duplan (yellow card) 64'; Bulthuis 66'; Van der Maarel (yellow card) 72'; Van der Hoorn 74'	Stadium: De Grolsch Veste; Attendance: 29,500; Referee: Kevin Blom

10 February 2013 22	PEC Zwolle	1–1	Twente	Zwolle
16:30 CET (UTC+1)	Avdić 81' (pen.)	Summary	Tadić 11'; Janssen (yellow card) 80'; Mihaylov (yellow card) 81'	Stadium: IJsseldelta Stadion; Attendance: 11,041; Referee: Tom van Sichem

16 February 2013 23	Twente	1–1	Willem II	Enschede
18:45 CET (UTC+1)	Douglas 43'	Summary	Ippel 90'	Stadium: De Grolsch Veste; Attendance: 29,500; Referee: Serdar Gözübüyük

23 February 2013 24	Heerenveen	2–1	Twente	Heerenveen
20:45 CET (UTC+1)	Van La Parra 15'; Finnbogason 79'	Summary	Bulykin 54'; Braafheid (yellow card) 30' (yellow-red card) 87'	Stadium: Abe Lenstra Stadion; Attendance: 24,885; Referee: Danny Makkelie

2 March 2013 25	Twente	0–2	Ajax	Enschede
20:45 CET (UTC+1)		Summary	Moisander 4'; Alderweireld 35'	Stadium: De Grolsch Veste; Attendance: 30,000; Referee: Richard Liesveld

10 March 2013 26	Twente	0–1	Vitesse	Enschede
16:30 CET (UTC+1)		Summary	Bony 63'	Stadium: De Grolsch Veste; Attendance: 29,700; Referee: Ruud Bossen

17 March 2013 27	Groningen	0–3	Twente	Groningen
CET (UTC+1)	Bizot (red card) 78'	Summary	Fer 45+1'; Tadić 80' (pen.); Castaignos 87'	Stadium: Euroborg; Attendance: 21,330; Referee: Kevin Blom

30 March 2013 28	Twente	1–1	NAC Breda	Enschede
18:45 CET (UTC+1)	Brama 83'	Summary	Van der Weg 50'	Stadium: De Grolsch Veste; Attendance: 29,250; Referee: Ed Janssen

6 April 2013 29	Twente	2–0	Roda JC	Enschede
CEST (UTC+2)	Castaignos 44'; Chadli 56'	Summary		Stadium: De Grolsch Veste; Attendance: 29,200; Referee: Dennis Higler

13 April 2013 30	ADO Den Haag	1–3	Twente	The Hague
20:45 CEST (UTC+2)	Van Duinen 41'; Holla (yellow card) 51' (yellow-red card) 60'	Summary	Douglas 24'; Bulykin 81', 83'	Stadium: Kyocera Stadion; Attendance: 10,330; Referee: Pol van Boekel

21 April 2013 31	VVV-Venlo	2–2	Twente	Venlo
12:30 CEST (UTC+2)	Röseler 18'; Nwofor 23'	Summary	Bengtsson 58'; Castaignos 59'	Stadium: De Koel; Attendance: 5,500; Referee: Pieter Vink

28 April 2013 33	Twente	5–2	N.E.C.	Enschede
12:30 CEST (UTC+2)	Douglas 3'; Castaignos 22'; Chadli 47'; Bengtsson 59'; Gutiérrez 90+2'	Summary	Van der Velden 50'; Falkenburg 90'	Stadium: De Grolsch Veste; Attendance: 29,200; Referee: Jan Wegereef

5 May 2013 33	Heracles	1–1	Twente	Almelo
12:30 CEST (UTC+2)	Bruns 7'	Summary	Fer 27'	Stadium: Polman Stadion; Attendance: 8,500; Referee: Tom van Sichem

12 May 2013 34	Twente	3–1	PSV	Enschede
14:30 CEST (UTC+2)	Castaignos 3'; Chadli 27'; Janssen 54'	Summary	Mertens 40' (pen.); Van Bommel (yellow card) 56' (yellow-red card) 71'	Stadium: De Grolsch Veste; Attendance: 29,350; Referee: Danny Makkelie

==== League table ====
Pos	Team	Pld	W	D	L	GF	GA	GD	Pts	Qualification or relegation
4	Vitesse Arnhem	34	19	7	8	68	42	+26	64	Qualification for the Europa League third qualifying round
5	Utrecht (O)	34	19	6	9	55	41	+14	63	Qualification to European competition play-offs
6	Twente	34	17	11	6	60	33	+27	62	Qualification to European competition play-offs
7	Groningen	34	12	7	15	36	53	−17	43	Qualification to European competition play-offs
8	Heerenveen	34	11	9	14	50	63	−13	42	Qualification to European competition play-offs

Source: Eredivisie
Rules for classification: 1) points; 2) goal difference; 3) number of goals scored.
(O) Play-off winners

==== European competition ====
16 May 2013 Semi-Final 1st leg	Groningen	0–1	Twente	Groningen
18:45 CEST (UTC+2)		Summary	Gutiérrez 22'	Stadium: Euroborg; Attendance: 11,178; Referee: Pieter Vink

19 May 2013 Semi-Final 2nd leg	Twente	3–2 (4–2 agg.)	Groningen	Enschede
12:30 CEST (UTC+2)	Braafheid 12'; Gutiérrez 84'; Chadli 90+1'	Summary	Braafheid 23' (o.g.); Kirm 26'	Stadium: De Grolsch Veste; Attendance: 22,500; Referee: Richard Liesveld

23 May 2013 Final 1st leg	Twente	0–2	Utrecht	Enschede
20:45 CEST (UTC+2)		Summary	Van der Gun 9'; Duplan 59'; Asare (yellow card) 41' (yellow-red card) 90+3'	Stadium: De Grolsch Veste; Attendance: 20,500; Referee: Reinold Wiedemeijer

26 May 2013 Final 2nd leg	Utrecht	1–2 (3–2 agg.)	Twente	Utrecht
12:30 CEST (UTC+2)	Duplan 46'	Summary	Tadić 34'; Chadli 36'	Stadium: Stadion Galgenwaard; Attendance: 23,397; Referee: Danny Makkelie

=== KNVB Beker ===
26 September 2012 Round 2	RVVH	0–1	Twente	Ridderkerk
17:00 CEST (UTC+2)		Summary	Castaignos 90+2'	Stadium: Sportpark Ridderkerk; Attendance: 2,500; Referee: Edwin van de Graaf

1 November 2012 Round 3	Twente	1–2	FC Den Bosch	Enschede
18:45 CET (UTC+1)	Landzaat 16' (pen.); Boyata (red card) 23'; Wisgerhof (yellow card) 31'; Castaignos (yellow card) 66' (yellow-red card)	Summary	Brock (yellow card) 15', (goal) 38'; Van Weert 62'; Van den Broek (yellow card) 66'; Boldewijn (yellow card) 90'	Stadium: De Grolsch Veste; Attendance: 21,000; Referee: Reinold Wiedemeijer

=== UEFA Europa League ===
==== Qualifying Phase ====
5 July 2012 1st qualifying round 1st leg	Twente (Netherlands)	6–0	(Andorra) UE Santa Coloma	Enschede
19:45 CEST (UTC+2)	Schilder 28', 29'; Tadić 63'; John 71'; Plet 77', 79'	Summary	Victor Rodríguez Soria (yellow card) 31'; Martínez (yellow card) 44'; Ivan Periánez (yellow card) 69'; Salvat (yellow card) 81' (yellow-red card); Rubio (yellow card) 86'	Stadium: De Grolsch Veste; Attendance: 18,000; Referee: Enea Jorgji (Albania)

12 July 2012 1st qualifying round 2nd leg	UE Santa Coloma (Andorra)	0–3 (0–9 agg.)	(Netherlands) Twente	Andorra la Vella
19:30 CEST (UTC+2)	Josep Rivas Prieto (yellow card) 19'; Josep Vall (yellow card) 24'	Summary	Janssen 19' (pen.); Wisgerhof 29'; Plet 34'; Breukers (yellow card) 82'	Stadium: Estadi Comunal d'Andorra la Vella; Attendance: 710; Referee: Chris Reisch (Luxembourg)

19 July 2012 2nd qualifying round 1st leg	Twente (Netherlands)	1–1	(Finland) Inter Turku	Enschede
19:30 CEST (UTC+2)	Tadić 66'	Summary	Bouwman 38'; Reponen (yellow card) 48'; Aho (yellow card) 57'	Stadium: De Grolsch Veste; Attendance: 18,100; Referee: Cyril Zimmermann (Switzerland)

26 July 2012 2nd qualifying round 2nd leg	Inter Turku (Finland)	0–5 (1–6 agg.)	(Netherlands) Twente	Turku
18:00 CEST (UTC+2)		Summary	Fer 4', 37'; Plet 7'; Chadli 77', 89'	Stadium: Veritas Stadion; Attendance: 7,610; Referee: Ivan Bebek (Croatia)

2 August 2012 3rd qualifying round 1st leg	Twente (Netherlands)	2–0	(Czech Republic) Mladá Boleslav	Enschede
19:45 CEST (UTC+2)	Fer 52'; Chadli 58' (yellow card) 89'	Summary	Kysela (yellow card) 74'; Mareš (yellow card) 83'; Kúdela (yellow card) 88'	Stadium: De Grolsch Veste; Attendance: 18,500; Referee: Kristo Tohver (Estonia)

9 August 2012 3rd qualifying round 2nd leg	Mladá Boleslav (Czech Republic)	0–2 (0–4 agg.)	(Netherlands) Twente	Mladá Boleslav
19:00 CEST (UTC+2)	Mareš (yellow card) 2'; Johana (yellow card) 45'; Sivrić (yellow card) 82'; Ondřejka (yellow card) 85'	Summary	Chadli 9'; Fer 31'; Schilder (yellow card) 59'	Stadium: Městský stadion Attendance: 3,077; Referee: Maxim Layushkin (Russia)

23 August 2012 Playoff 1st leg	Bursaspor (Turkey)	3–1	(Netherlands) Twente	Bursa
19:30 CEST (UTC+2)	Batalla 40', 82', (yellow card) 49'; Öztürk (yellow card) 47'; Šesták 53'; Erdoğan (yellow card) 67'	Summary	Chadli 31'; Fer (yellow card) 44'	Stadium: Bursa Atatürk Stadium; Attendance: 24,216; Referee: David Fernández (Spain)

30 August 2012 Playoff 2nd leg	Twente (Netherlands)	4–1 (a.e.t.) (5–4 agg.)	(Turkey) Bursaspor	Enschede
19:30 CEST (UTC+2)	Brama (yellow card) 20'; Fer 26' (pen.), 116', (yellow card) 54'; Schilder 61'; Gutiérrez 62'; Castaignos (yellow card) 88'	Summary	Erdoğan (yellow card) 25'; Pinto 45+4'; Chrétien (yellow card) 50' (yellow-red card) 89'; Öztürk (yellow card) 54'; Carson (yellow card) 102'; Çağıran (yellow card) 116'	Stadium: De Grolsch Veste; Attendance: 22,000; Referee: Nicola Rizzoli (Italy)

==== Group stage ====
Pos	Team	Pld	W	D	L	GF	GA	GD	Pts	Qualification
1	(Germany) Hannover 96	6	3	3	0	11	8	+3	12	Advance to knockout phase
2	(Spain) Levante	6	3	2	1	10	5	+5	11	Advance to knockout phase
3	(Sweden) Helsingborgs IF	6	1	1	4	9	12	−3	4 (Note: Head-to-head points: Helsingborg 4, Twente 1.)	
4	(Netherlands) Twente	6	0	4	2	5	10	−5	4	

Source: Soccerway
Notes:

20 September 2012 1	Twente (Netherlands)	2–2	(Germany) Hannover 96	Enschede
21:05 CEST (UTC+2)	Janssen 7'; Chadli 54'; Landzaat (yellow card) 84'	Summary	Huszti (yellow card) 38'; Rausch (yellow card) 58'; Sobiech 67'; Wisgerhof 73' (o.g.); Eggimann (yellow card) 90'	Stadium: De Grolsch Veste; Attendance: 22,500; Referee: Mike Dean (England)

4 October 2012 2	Helsingborg (Sweden)	2–2	(Netherlands) Twente	Helsingborg
19:00 CEST (UTC+2)	Đurđić 7', 43'; Lindström (yellow card) 52'	Summary	Rosales (yellow card) 62'; Bengtsson 74'; Douglas 88'	Stadium: Olympia; Attendance: 5,578; Referee: Bobby Madden (Scotland)

25 October 2012 3	Levante (Spain)	3–0	(Netherlands) Twente	Valencia
19:00 CEST (UTC+2)	Karabelas (yellow card) 41'; Juanlu (yellow card) 58'; Míchel 59' (pen.); Ángel (yellow card) 75'; Ríos 78', 88'; Ballesteros (yellow card) 90+3'	Summary	Douglas (yellow card) 44'; Schilder (yellow card) 68'; Bengtsson (yellow card) 90+3'	Stadium: Estadi Ciutat de València; Attendance: 8,565; Referee: Vladislav Bezborodov (Russia)

8 November 2012 4	Twente (Netherlands)	0–0	(Spain) Levante	Enschede
21:05 CET (UTC+1)	Tadić (yellow card) 90+2'	Summary	Míchel (yellow card) 63'; Ballesteros (yellow card) 78'; Diop (yellow card) 82'	Stadium: De Grolsch Veste; Attendance: 19,500; Referee: Tony Chapron (France)

22 November 2012 5	Hannover 96 (Germany)	0–0	(Netherlands) Twente	Hanover
19:00 CET (UTC+1)	Eggimann (yellow card) 72'; Pinto (yellow card) 86'	Summary	Bengtsson (red card) 84'; Fer (yellow card) 90'	Stadium: AWD-Arena; Attendance: 35,800; Referee: Aleksei Kulbakov (Belarus)

6 December 2012 6	Twente (Netherlands)	1–3	(Sweden) Helsingborg	Enschede
21:05 CET (UTC+1)	Boyata (yellow card) 13'; Tadić 74', (yellow card) 83'	Summary	Đurđić 6'; Bedoya 21'; Sørum 67'	Stadium: De Grolsch Veste; Attendance: 15,000; Referee: Ilias Spathas (Greece)

== Squad statistics ==
As of match played 26 May 2013

=== Appearances and goals ===
No.	Pos	Nat	Player	Total		Eredivisie		KNVB Cup		Europa League		European competition	
No.	Pos	Nat	Player	Apps	Goals	Apps	Goals	Apps	Goals	Apps	Goals	Apps	Goals
1	GK	(Netherlands) NED	Sander Boschker	16	0	7+0	0	2+0	0	3+0	0	4+0	0
2	DF	(Denmark) DEN	Andreas Bjelland	14	0	4+2	0	0+0	0	3+1	0	4+0	0
4	DF	(Netherlands) NED	Peter Wisgerhof	21	1	7+4	0	1+0	0	7+1	1	1+0	0
5	DF	(Netherlands) NED	Robbert Schilder	39	5	27+1	2	0+0	0	10+1	3	0+0	0
6	MF	(Netherlands) NED	Wout Brama	39	1	25+0	1	0+0	0	12+2	0	0+0	0
7	MF	(Netherlands) NED	Denny Landzaat	14	1	0+7	0	2+0	1	2+3	0	0+0	0
8	MF	(Netherlands) NED	Leroy Fer	38	11	25+1	5	0+0	0	6+2	6	4+0	0
9	FW	(Russia) RUS	Dmitry Bulykin	29	5	12+10	5	0+0	0	3+4	0	0+0	0
10	FW	(Serbia) SRB	Dušan Tadić	51	16	32+1	12	0+1	0	11+2	3	4+0	1
11	FW	(Netherlands) NED	Jerson Cabral	14	0	1+8	0	2+0	0	1+2	0	0+0	0
13	GK	(Bulgaria) BUL	Nikolay Mihaylov	35	0	26+0	0	0+0	0	9+0	0	0+0	0
14	MF	(Netherlands) NED	Willem Janssen	46	5	24+6	3	0+0	0	10+2	2	4+0	0
15	DF	(Venezuela) VEN	Roberto Rosales	40	0	23+4	0	0+0	0	11+0	0	2+0	0
16	DF	(Netherlands) NED	Tim Breukers	19	0	10+0	0	1+0	0	3+2	0	2+1	0
17	DF	(Sweden) SWE	Rasmus Bengtsson	31	3	20+1	2	1+0	0	4+1	1	4+0	0
19	DF	(Netherlands) NED	Douglas	43	4	31+0	3	0+1	0	11+0	1	0+0	0
20	DF	(Netherlands) NED	Edson Braafheid	34	1	22+3	0	0+0	0	6+0	0	3+0	1
21	MF	(Chile) CHI	Felipe Gutiérrez	38	5	14+9	2	2+0	0	3+6	1	4+0	2
22	FW	(Belgium) BEL	Nacer Chadli	38	18	20+2	10	0+2	0	9+1	6	3+1	2
25	GK	(Portugal) POR	Daniel Fernandes	3	0	0+0	0	0+0	0	2+1	0	0+0	0
26	MF	(Ghana) GHA	Shadrach Eghan	2	0	0+2	0	0+0	0	0+0	0	0+0	0
30	FW	(Netherlands) NED	Luc Castaignos	47	14	25+9	13	1+1	1	6+1	0	4+0	0
35	GK	(Netherlands) NED	Timo Plattel	1	0	1+0	0	0+0	0	0+0	0	0+0	0
35	GK	(Poland) POL	Filip Bednarek	1	0	0+0	0	0+0	0	1+0	0	0+0	0
37	FW	(Germany) GER	Tim Hölscher	18	0	7+5	0	0+0	0	1+1	0	1+3	0
38	FW	(Germany) GER	Mirco Born	4	0	0+1	0	1+0	0	1+1	0	0+0	0
39	DF	(Netherlands) NED	Joey Pelupessy	7	0	2+1	0	2+0	0	2+0	0	0+0	0
41	DF	(Netherlands) NED	Coen Gortemaker	1	0	0+0	0	0+0	0	1+0	0	0+0	0
45	FW	(Netherlands) NED	Edwin Gyasi	16	1	8+4	1	2+0	0	1+0	0	0+1	0
46	FW	(Netherlands) NED	Felitciano Zschusschen	6	0	0+3	0	0+0	0	0+0	0	0+3	0
Players away from Twente on loan:
3	DF	(Netherlands) NED	Nicky Kuiper	4	0	0+0	0	2+0	0	2+0	0	0+0	0
12	DF	(Netherlands) NED	Tim Cornelisse	1	0	0+0	0	1+0	0	0+0	0	0+0	0
	DF	(Germany) GER	Nils Röseler	2	0	0+0	0	0+0	0	2+0	0	0+0	0
	MF	(Netherlands) NED	Quincy Promes	1	0	0+0	0	0+0	0	1+0	0	0+0	0
	FW	(Netherlands) NED	Glynor Plet	5	4	0+0	0	0+0	0	5+0	4	0+0	0
Players who appeared for Twente no longer at the club:
12	FW	(Netherlands) NED	Wesley Verhoek	9	0	0+3	0	0+0	0	2+4	0	0+0	0
18	DF	(Belgium) BEL	Dedryck Boyata	10	0	1+4	0	2+0	0	2+1	0	0+0	0
26	FW	(Netherlands) NED	Joshua John	2	1	0+0	0	0+0	0	2+0	1	0+0	0

=== Goal scorers ===
Place	Position	Nation	Number	Name	Eredivisie	KNVB Cup	Europa League	European competition	Total
1	FW	(Belgium)	22	Nacer Chadli	10	0	6	2	18
2	FW	(Serbia)	10	Dušan Tadić	12	0	3	1	16
3	FW	(Netherlands)	30	Luc Castaignos	13	1	0	0	14
4	MF	(Netherlands)	8	Leroy Fer	5	0	6	0	11
5	DF	(Netherlands)	5	Robbert Schilder	2	0	3	0	5
5	FW	(Russia)	9	Dmitry Bulykin	5	0	0	0	5
5	MF	(Netherlands)	14	Willem Janssen	3	0	2	0	5
5	MF	(Chile)	21	Felipe Gutiérrez	2	0	1	2	5
9	FW	(Netherlands)		Glynor Plet	0	0	4	0	4
9	DF	(Netherlands)	19	Douglas	3	0	1	0	4
11	DF	(Sweden)	17	Rasmus Bengtsson	2	0	1	0	3
12	FW	(Netherlands)	45	Edwin Gyasi	1	0	0	0	1
12	DF	(Netherlands)	6	Wout Brama	1	0	0	0	1
12				Own goal	1	0	0	0	1
12	MF	(Netherlands)	7	Denny Landzaat	0	1	0	0	1
12	DF	(Netherlands)	4	Peter Wisgerhof	0	0	1	0	1
12	FW	(Netherlands)		Joshua John	0	0	1	0	1
12	DF	(Netherlands)	20	Edson Braafheid	0	0	0	1	1
				TOTALS	60	2	29	5 95	

=== Disciplinary record ===
Number	Nation	Position	Name	Eredivisie		KNVB Cup		Europa League		European competition		Total	
Number	Nation	Position	Name	Yellow card	Red card	Yellow card	Red card	Yellow card	Red card	Yellow card	Red card	Yellow card	Red card
2	(Denmark)	DF	Andreas Bjelland	0	0	0	0	0	0	1	0	1	0
4	(Netherlands)	DF	Peter Wisgerhof	1	0	1	0	0	0	0	0	2	0
5	(Netherlands)	DF	Robbert Schilder	2	0	0	0	2	0	0	0	4	0
6	(Netherlands)	MF	Wout Brama	7	0	0	0	1	0	0	0	8	0
7	(Netherlands)	MF	Denny Landzaat	0	0	0	0	1	0	0	0	1	0
8	(Netherlands)	MF	Leroy Fer	3	0	0	0	3	0	2	0	8	0
10	(Serbia)	FW	Dušan Tadić	5	0	0	0	2	0	0	0	7	0
11	(Netherlands)	FW	Jerson Cabral	0	0	1	0	0	0	0	0	1	0
12	(Netherlands)	FW	Wesley Verhoek	1	0	0	0	1	0	0	0	2	0
13	(Bulgaria)	GK	Nikolay Mihaylov	1	0	0	0	0	0	0	0	1	0
14	(Netherlands)	MF	Willem Janssen	6	0	0	0	0	0	0	0	6	0
15	(Venezuela)	DF	Roberto Rosales	8	0	0	0	1	0	0	0	9	0
16	(Netherlands)	DF	Tim Breukers	1	0	0	0	1	0	0	0	2	0
17	(Sweden)	DF	Rasmus Bengtsson	0	1	0	0	1	1	0	0	1	2
18	(Belgium)	DF	Dedryck Boyata	0	0	0	1	1	0	0	0	1	1
19	(Netherlands)	DF	Douglas	4	0	0	0	1	0	0	0	5	0
20	(Netherlands)	DF	Edson Braafheid	3	1	0	0	0	0	2	0	5	1
21	(Chile)	MF	Felipe Gutiérrez	1	0	0	0	0	0	0	0	1	0
22	(Belgium)	FW	Nacer Chadli	1	0	0	0	1	0	0	0	2	0
30	(Netherlands)	FW	Luc Castaignos	1	0	2	1	1	0	0	0	4	1
37	(Germany)	FW	Tim Hölscher	1	0	0	0	0	0	1	0	2	0
38	(Germany)	FW	Mirco Born	0	0	1	0	0	0	0	0	1	0
			TOTALS	47	2	5	2	17	1	6	0	75	5
