= 2017–18 West Bromwich Albion F.C. season =

West Bromwich Albion F.C.
2017–18 season
- Owner: Lai Guochuan
- Head coach: Tony Pulis (until 20 November); Gary Megson (Caretaker, from 20 to 29 November); Alan Pardew (from 29 November 2017 to 2 April); Darren Moore (Caretaker, from 2 April)
- Stadium: The Hawthorns
- Premier League: 20th (relegated)
- FA Cup: Fifth round
- EFL Cup: Third round
- Top goalscorer: League: Jay Rodriguez; Salomón Rondón (7); All: Jay Rodriguez (11)
- Highest home attendance: 26,223 vs.Arsenal (31 December 2017)
- Lowest home attendance: 22,704 vs.Stoke City (27 August 2017)
- Average home league attendance: 24,520
Home colours	Away colours	Third colours

The 2017–18 season was West Bromwich Albion's eighth consecutive season in the Premier League and their 140th year in existence. This season the club participated in the Premier League, FA Cup and League Cup. Tony Pulis began the season as the team's head coach but a poor run of form led to his dismissal in November; he was succeeded by Alan Pardew later that month. On 2 April 2018, Pardew left West Brom by mutual consent. First team coach and former player Darren Moore took the stand until the end of the season.

The season covered the period from 1 July 2017 to 30 June 2018, with competitive matches played between August and May.

West Bromwich Albion's relegation to the Championship was confirmed on 8 May 2018, by virtue of Southampton earning a 1–0 away victory at fellow strugglers Swansea City.

== Background ==
During the off-season, West Bromwich Albion made several improvements to their stadium, The Hawthorns. The club increased the number of wheelchair bays from 145 to 171 and installed Changing Places toilets, which are a special type of accessible toilet. They also installed new giant screens inside the stadium, created a sensory area—to cater for young fans on the autism spectrum—and added "nostalgic" artwork to the concourses. The club's season ticket sales hit a seven-year high following a reduction in prices.

League finish predictions
Organisation	Pos.	Notes
90min.com/Yahoo! Sports	14th	
BBC Sport	12th	
Birmingham Mail	12th	
The Daily Telegraph	14th	
ESPN	16th	
Football365	13th	
Goal.com	11th	
The Guardian	12th	
Sky Sports	13th	

The club unveiled two new kits for the season, both of which were manufactured by Adidas. The home attire featured Albion's traditional navy blue and white vertical striped shirts, white shorts and white socks, though the backs and sleeves of the shirts were all navy blue. The away kit comprised white jerseys with red sleeves and red shorts and socks. The team's main shirt sponsor was Palm Eco-Town Development Company, whom West Bromwich Albion owner Guochuan Lai had served as general manager for over 20 years. The deal is thought to be worth £6 million to Albion over two years. Additionally, Albion's shirt sleeves were sponsored by online gambling provider 12BET, following a ruling by the Premier League that allowed clubs to add sponsor's logos to sleeves for the first time.

Assistant head coach Dave Kemp retired after spending over 40 years in football and was replaced by Gary Megson, who returned after having led Albion to the Premier League as manager in the 2000s. Jonny Evans was named as the club's new captain following the departure of Darren Fletcher to Stoke City. Shortly before the start of the new season, head coach Tony Pulis signed a one-year contract extension to keep him at the club until 2019.

Prior to the start of the season, sports journalists were unanimous in forecasting that Albion would finish in the bottom half of the Premier League but avoid relegation. The BBC's chief football writer, Phil McNulty, expected Tony Pulis to keep the team in the top division "with the minimum of fuss". Paul Merson of Sky Sports thought that Albion would be "solid" and "hard to beat" under Pulis and that without him the team would finish "five or so places" lower. ESPN's Iain Macintosh was more pessimistic, predicting that West Brom would finish only two places above the relegation zone. Oddschecker quoted odds of 750/1 on Albion winning the Premier League, while Paddy Power offered 6/1 on the club being relegated.

== Transfers ==
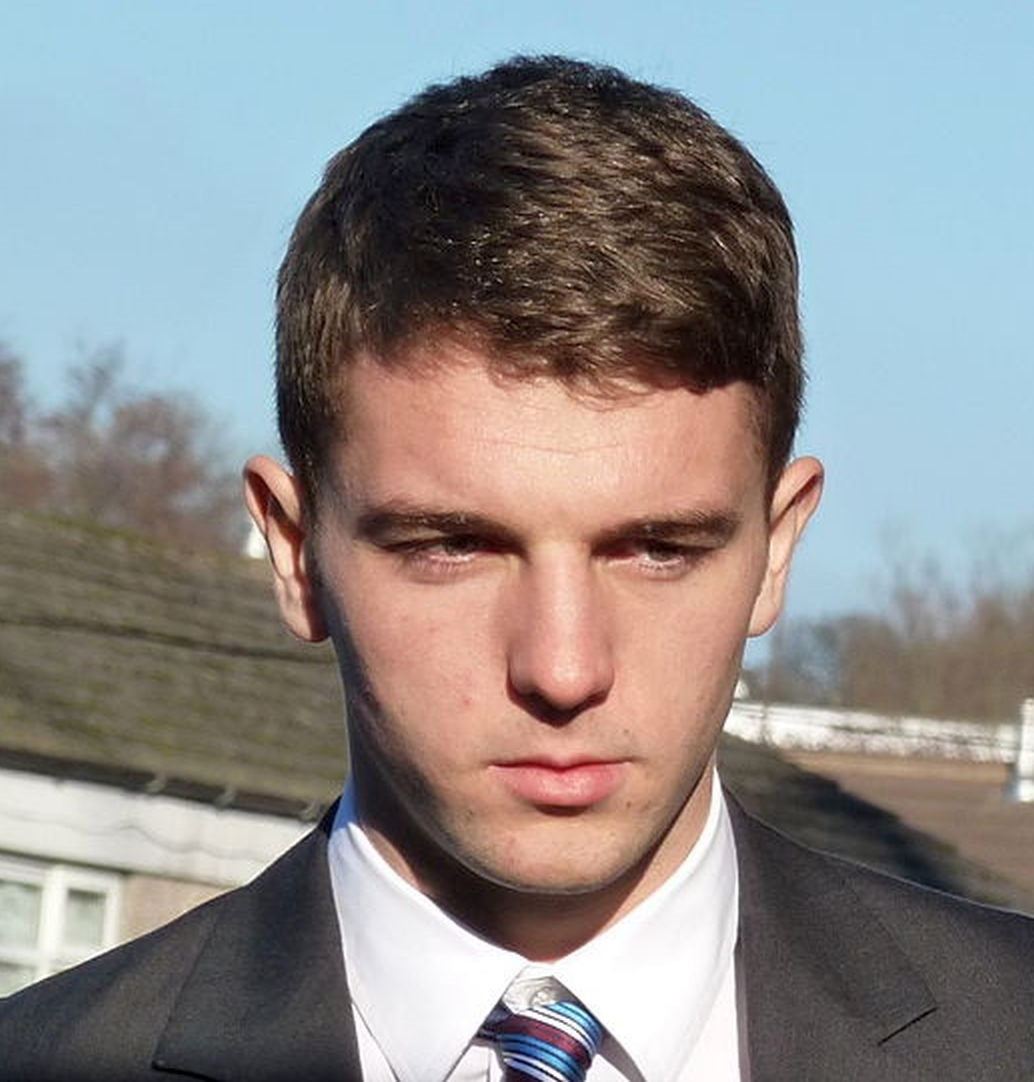
Jay Rodriguez was one of Albion's summer signings.

=== Transfers in ===
Date from	Position	Nationality	Name	From	Fee	Ref.
2 July 2017	CF	(England)	Jay Rodriguez	Southampton	£13m	
3 July 2017	CF	(China)	Zhang Yuning	Vitesse	£6.5m	
15 August 2017	CM	(England)	Gareth Barry	Everton	£1m	
25 August 2017	RW	(Scotland)	Oliver Burke	RB Leipzig	£13.5m	
30 August 2017	LB	(England)	Kieran Gibbs	Arsenal	£7m	
31 August 2017	DF	(England)	Kyle Jameson	Chelsea	Undisclosed	
18 December 2017	CB	(Egypt)	Ahmed Hegazi	Al Ahly	£4.5m	

=== Loans in ===
Start date	Position	Nationality	Name	From	End date	Ref.
17 July 2017	CB	(Egypt)	Ahmed Hegazi	Al Ahly	30 June 2018	
30 August 2017	CM	(Poland)	Grzegorz Krychowiak	Paris Saint Germain	30 June 2018	
29 January 2018	CB	(Egypt)	Ali Gabr	Zamalek	30 June 2018	
29 January 2018	CF	(England)	Daniel Sturridge	Liverpool	30 June 2018	

=== Transfers out ===
Date from	Position	Nationality	Name	To	Fee	Ref.
1 July 2017	CB	(Cyprus)	Panayiotis Artymatas	Anorthosis Famagusta	Released	(Note: Panayiotis Artymatas joined Anorthosis Famagusta following his release.)
1 July 2017	CB	(United States)	Danny Barbir	Free agent	Released	
1 July 2017	CM	(England)	Sameron Dool	Free agent	Released	
1 July 2017	RW	(Republic of Ireland)	Zack Elbouzedi	Inverness Caledonian Thistle	Released	(Note: Zachary Elbouzedi joined Inverness Caledonian Thistle following his release.)
1 July 2017	CM	(Scotland)	Darren Fletcher	Stoke City	Free	
1 July 2017	CF	(Finland)	Marcus Forss	Brentford	Released	(Note: Marcus Forss joined Brentford following his release.)
1 July 2017	CB	(England)	Callam Jones	Free agent	Released	
1 July 2017	CM	(England)	Rahis Nabi	Burnley	Released	(Note: Rahis Nabi joined Burnley following his release.)
1 July 2017	DF	(England)	Jordan Piggott	Free agent	Released	
1 July 2017	LB	(England)	Callum Pritchatt	Free agent	Released	
1 July 2017	GK	(England)	Jack Rose	Southampton	Released	(Note: Jack Rose joined Southampton following his release.)
1 July 2017	AM	(England)	James Smith	Free agent	Released	
1 July 2017	DM	(England)	Bradley Sweeney	Free agent	Released	
1 July 2017	RW	(England)	Chay Tilt	Queens Park Rangers	Released	(Note: Chay Tilt joined Queens Park Rangers following his release.)
1 July 2017	CF	(England)	Andre Wright	Free agent	Released	
31 August 2017	RW	(England)	Callum McManaman	Sunderland	Undisclosed	
31 January 2018	CF	(England)	Tyler Roberts	Leeds United	Undisclosed	

=== Loans out ===
Start date	Position	Nationality	Name	To	End date	Ref.
3 July 2017	CF	(China)	Zhang Yuning	Werder Bremen	30 June 2019	
22 July 2017	CB	(England)	Jack Fitzwater	Forest Green Rovers	January 2018	
11 August 2017	CB	(Republic of Ireland)	Shaun Donnellan	Walsall	3 January 2018	
12 August 2017	CB	(England)	Kyle Howkins	Cambridge United	12 February 2018	
25 August 2017	CF	(Wales)	Tyler Roberts	Walsall	January 2018	
28 August 2017	RW	(England)	Jonathan Leko	Bristol City	30 June 2018	
31 August 2017	LM	(England)	Kyle Edwards	Exeter City	3 January 2018	
31 August 2017	CM	(England)	Rekeem Harper	Blackburn Rovers	30 June 2018	
31 August 2017	RB	(England)	Kane Wilson	Exeter City	3 January 2018	

== Pre-season ==
=== Premier League Asia Trophy ===
West Bromwich Albion participated in the 2017 Premier League Asia Trophy in Hong Kong. It was the eighth edition of the Premier League Asia Trophy pre-season tournament and the first to feature four teams from the Premier League.

19 July 2017 Semi-final	Leicester City	1–1 (7–6 p)	West Bromwich Albion	So Kon Po, Hong Kong
18:00 HKT	Mahrez 24'	Report	Rodriguez 10'	Stadium: Hong Kong Stadium; Attendance: 40,000; Referee: Paul Tierney (England)
	Penalties
	Ulloa (penalty scored); Vardy (penalty scored); Fuchs (penalty scored); Drinkwater (penalty scored); Iborra (penalty scored); King (penalty scored); Albrighton (penalty scored)		(penalty scored) Chadli; (penalty scored) Robson-Kanu; (penalty scored) Evans; (penalty scored) Dawson; (penalty scored) McClean; (penalty scored) Leko; (penalty missed) Field

22 July 2017 Third place playoff	West Bromwich Albion	0–2	Crystal Palace	So Kon Po, Hong Kong
18:00 HKT	Nyom (yellow card) 33'; Yacob (yellow card) 50'	Report	Milivojević 11'; Sako 43'	Stadium: Hong Kong Stadium; Attendance: 40,000; Referee: Chiu-Kok Ng (Hong Kong)

=== Teresa Herrera Trophy ===
The Teresa Herrera Trophy is a pre-season tournament that has been held annually in A Coruña, Spain, since 1946. The competition has sometimes featured four teams in a semi-final, final and third place play-off, while in other years —including 2017—only a single match final takes place. West Bromwich Albion were taking part in the competition for the first time and were defeated 2–0 by tournament hosts Deportivo de La Coruña, who were managed by former Albion head coach Pepe Mel.

5 August 2017	Deportivo La Coruña	2–0	West Bromwich Albion	A Coruña, Spain
21:00 CEST	Gama 71'; Borja 86'	Report		Stadium: Estadio Riazor

=== Other friendlies ===
As of 22 June 2017, West Bromwich Albion have announced eight pre-season friendlies against Burton Albion, Walsall, Kidderminster Harriers, Port Vale, Bristol Rovers, Slough Town, Deportivo de La Coruña and Slavia Prague.

12 July 2017	Slavia Prague	2–1	West Bromwich Albion	Kumberg, Austria
17:00 CEST	Deli 50'; Frydrych 77'	Report	McClean 26'	Stadium: TBA

26 July 2017	Burton Albion	0–1	West Bromwich Albion	Burton upon Trent
19:45 BST		Report	Rodriguez 77'	Stadium: Pirelli Stadium; Attendance: 2,211

26 July 2017	Walsall	1–2	West Bromwich Albion	Walsall
19:45 BST	Bakayoko 77'	Report	Donnellan 53'; Robson-Kanu 89'	Stadium: Banks's Stadium

29 July 2017	Bristol Rovers	2–1	West Bromwich Albion	Horfield
15:00 BST	Harrison 5'; Nichols 86'	Report	Dawson 90'	Stadium: Memorial Stadium

29 July 2017	Slough Town	2–1	West Bromwich Albion	Slough
15:00 BST	Harris 29'; Flood 54'		Roberts 13'	Stadium: Arbour Park

1 August 2017	Kidderminster Harriers	P–P	West Bromwich Albion	Kidderminster
19:45 BST				Stadium: Aggborough Stadium

1 August 2017	Port Vale	1–1	West Bromwich Albion	Burslem
19:30 BST	Pope 86'	Report	Robson-Kanu 43'	Stadium: Vale Park

== Premier League ==
West Bromwich Albion competed in the 2017–18 Premier League, the 26th season of English football's top division since its breakaway from the Football League in 1992. It was Albion's 12th season (8th consecutive) in the Premier League, 80th season in the top tier of English football and their 119th season of league football in all. (Note: Seasons in the top tier includes those in the Premier League (1992–93 onwards) and Football League First Division (1991–92 and prior). The total of league seasons does not include the partial season of 1939–40, which was abandoned after just a few games due to the outbreak of the Second World War and all results annulled.) West Brom's provisional fixture list was announced on 14 June 2017, but as is common for Premier League clubs, a number of the Saturday matches were subsequently rescheduled for live broadcast on television. The away games against Arsenal, Leicester City and Chelsea were selected for Sky Sports' Monday Night Football. Home matches against Stoke City, Manchester United and Arsenal and the away game at Manchester United were shown on Sky's Super Sunday programme. The rescheduling of the Arsenal home game caused the away game against West Ham United to be moved from New Year's Day (Monday) to the following evening, Tuesday 2 January, though the latter was not televised. The home game against Liverpool was switched to a lunchtime slot for coverage on Sky Sports and the away game versus Southampton was moved to a Saturday evening for screening on BT Sport.

=== August ===
Albion's opening match was at home to A.F.C. Bournemouth and featured debuts for new signing Jay Rodriguez and loanee Ahmed Hegazi. Rodriguez was named man of the match for his performance, while Hegazi scored the only goal of the game, thus becoming the first Baggies player to score on his Premier League debut since Thievy did so in 2014. Albion won their opening league match for the second successive season, the first time they had done so since 1992 and the first time in the top division since 1978. West Brom's first away match of the season also resulted in a 1–0 win, Hal Robson-Kanu scoring the second half goal against Burnley before being sent off for elbowing Matthew Lowton 12 minutes later. He is only the fourth player to come on as a sub, score and be sent off in the same Premier League game. Albion won their opening two league games of a top flight season for the first time since 1978–79. The team's 100% start came to an end following a 1–1 against Stoke City, though the draw did ensure that Albion remained unbeaten heading into the international break.

=== September ===
On 9 September 2017, West Brom's unbeaten record in the league came to an end after their 3–1 defeat away at Premier League newcomers Brighton & Hove Albion, who scored their first league goals and earned their first league win with the result. West Brom found themselves 3–0 down in the second half courtesy of a brace from Pascal Groß and a headed goal from Tomer Hemed. They did manage to pull a goal back through James Morrison late in the game, but it was not enough as West Brom fell to 9th in the table. Albion's goalless draw at home to West Ham United was Tony Pulis' 100th Premier League game in charge of the club, making him the first Baggies head coach to reach that milestone. On 25 September 2017, Gareth Barry became the all-time leading appearance maker in Premier League history after appearing against Arsenal, playing his 633th premier league game that made him surpass former Manchester United midfielder Ryan Giggs. He was also given the armband in this game. But the team lost 2–0 from a brace of Alexandre Lacazette, stretching Tony Pulis's awful managerial records at the Emirates Stadium. Five days later, they squandered a 2–0 lead they had taken in the opening 20 minuntes through Rondón and Evans'goals against Watford at home, being equalized by Richarlison in the 95th minute.

=== December ===
Albion lost 3–1 away at Stoke City in the 100th top flight meeting between the two sides. Salomón Rondón—in his 100th game for the club—scored Albion's consolation goal.

=== January ===
Albion started the new year with a tough visit to West Ham United, kicked off only 50 hours after the Arsenal clash, while West Ham had a week to spare due to their fixtures against Tottenham Hotspur was postponed. Club Chairman John Williams had requested a postpone for this match but dismissed by the FA. James McClean scores his first goal for club in 16 months, where last one also against West Ham. But a brace from Andy Carroll helped the home side bounce back, where the second goal being a 95-minute late winner. Jake Livermore was involved in an angry exchange with a fan after he was substituted in the second half, which was later confirmed that fan made remarks related to Livermore's abortive son. The midfielder was not charged by the FA while the fan later received an 'indefinite ban' from West Ham for home and away games. West Brom finally picked up their first league win across 5 months and 20 games at home against Brighton, defenders Jonny Evans and Craig Dawson each scored a header from corners respectively.

One week later, Albion earned a 1–1 draw away to Everton, but unfortunately the match is overshadowed as home midfielder James McCarthy suffered a broken leg after putting out a harsh tackle on Salomón Rondón and was set to miss out for a lengthy period. James McClean came on in the second half and made his 100th appearance for West Brom.

=== League table ===
Pos	Team	Pld	W	D	L	GF	GA	GD	Pts	Qualification or relegation
16	Huddersfield Town	38	9	10	19	28	58	−30	37	
17	Southampton	38	7	15	16	37	56	−19	36	
18	Swansea City (R)	38	8	9	21	28	56	−28	33	Relegation to EFL Championship
19	Stoke City (R)	38	7	12	19	35	68	−33	33	Relegation to EFL Championship
20	West Bromwich Albion (R)	38	6	13	19	31	56	−25	31	Relegation to EFL Championship

Source: Premier League
Rules for classification: 1) Points; 2) Goal difference; 3) Goals scored. 4) Play-offs (only if needed to decide champion, teams for relegation or teams for UEFA competitions).
(R) Relegated

=== Result summary ===
Overall								Home						Away					
Pld	W	D	L	GF	GA	GD	Pts	W	D	L	GF	GA	GD	W	D	L	GF	GA	GD
38	6	13	19	31	56	−25	31	3	9	7	21	29	−8	3	4	12	10	27	−17

Last updated: 13 May 2018.
Source: Premier League

=== Results by matchday ===
Matchday	1	2	3	4	5	6	7	8	9	10	11	12	13	14	15	16	17	18	19	20	21	22	23	24	25	26	27	28	29	30	31	32	33	34	35	36	37	38
Ground	H	A	H	A	H	A	H	A	A	H	A	H	A	H	H	A	A	H	A	H	H	A	H	A	A	H	A	H	A	H	A	H	H	A	H	A	H	A
Result	W	W	D	L	D	L	D	D	L	L	L	L	D	D	D	L	D	L	L	D	D	L	W	D	L	L	L	L	L	L	L	L	D	W	D	W	W	L
Position	8	3	5	9	10	12	10	10	13	14	15	17	17	16	17	17	17	19	19	19	19	19	19	19	20	20	20	20	20	20	20	20	20	20	20	20	19	20

Updated to match(es) played on 5 May 2018. Source: 11v11
A = Away; H = Home; W = Win; D = Draw; L = Loss

=== Matches ===
12 August 2017 1	West Bromwich Albion	1–0	AFC Bournemouth	West Bromwich
15:00 BST	Hegazi 31'; Yacob (yellow card) 34'; Rodriguez (yellow card) 82'; Robson-Kanu (yellow card) 90'	Report	Arter (yellow card) 86'	Stadium: The Hawthorns; Attendance: 25,011 (2,509 away); Referee: Robert Madley

19 August 2017 2	Burnley	0–1	West Bromwich Albion	Burnley
15:00 BST	Barnes (yellow card) 90'	Report	Robson-Kanu 71', (red card) 83'	Stadium: Turf Moor; Attendance: 19,619 (1,337 away); Referee: Martin Atkinson

27 August 2017 3	West Bromwich Albion	1–1	Stoke City	West Bromwich
13:30 BST	Rodriguez (yellow card) 52', (goal) 61'; Rondón (yellow card) 84'	Report	Pieters (yellow card) 33'; Crouch 77'; Allen (yellow card) 88'	Stadium: The Hawthorns; Attendance: 22,704 (2,547 away); Referee: Anthony Taylor

9 September 2017 4	Brighton & Hove Albion	3–1	West Bromwich Albion	Falmer
15:00 BST	Groß 45', 48'; Hemed 63'; March (yellow card) 88'; Murray (yellow card) 90+1'	Report	Morrison 77'	Stadium: Falmer Stadium; Attendance: 30,381 (2,550 away); Referee: Chris Kavanagh

16 September 2017 5	West Bromwich Albion	0–0	West Ham United	West Bromwich
15:00 BST	Foster (yellow card) 66'; McClean (yellow card) 83'	Report	Zabaleta (yellow card) 9'; Antonio (yellow card) 90+6'	Stadium: The Hawthorns; Attendance: 24,942 (2,598 away); Referee: Paul Tierney

25 September 2017 6	Arsenal	2–0	West Bromwich Albion	Holloway
20:00 BST	Lacazette 20', 67' (pen.); Sánchez (yellow card) 44'	Report	Evans (yellow card) 35'; Dawson (yellow card) 49'; Krychowiak (yellow card) 56'; Nyom (yellow card) 67'	Stadium: Emirates Stadium; Attendance: 59,134 (956 away); Referee: Robert Madley

30 September 2017 7	West Bromwich Albion	2–2	Watford	West Bromwich
15:00 BST	Rondón 18'; Evans 21', (yellow card) 88'; Livermore (yellow card) 87'; McClean (yellow card) 90'	Report	Doucouré 37'; Richarlison 90+5'	Stadium: The Hawthorns; Attendance: 24,606 (2,600 away); Referee: Michael Oliver

16 October 2017 8	Leicester City	1–1	West Bromwich Albion	Leicester
20:00 BST	Iheanacho (yellow card) 62'; Albrighton (yellow card) 68'; Mahrez 80'	Report	Hegazi (yellow card) 8'; Myhill (yellow card) 47'; Chadli 63'	Stadium: King Power Stadium; Attendance: 30,203 (1,623 away); Referee: Mike Dean

21 October 2017 9	Southampton	1–0	West Bromwich Albion	Southampton
17:30 BST	Boufal 85'	Report	Chadli (yellow card) 67'	Stadium: St Mary's Stadium; Attendance: 29,947 (1,207 away); Referee: Graham Scott

28 October 2017 10	West Bromwich Albion	2–3	Manchester City	West Bromwich
15:00 BST	Rodriguez 13'; Evans (yellow card) 21'; Hegazi (yellow card) 72'; Phillips 90+2'	Report	Sané 10'; Fernandinho 15'; Jesus (yellow card) 60'; Sterling 64'; Otamendi (yellow card) 71'; Walker (yellow card) 90+4'	Stadium: The Hawthorns; Attendance: 24,003 (2,600 away); Referee: Mike Jones

4 November 2017 11	Huddersfield Town	1–0	West Bromwich Albion	Huddersfield
15:00 GMT	van La Parra 44'; Schindler (red card) 57'; Williams (yellow card) 70'	Report	Hegazi (yellow card) 31'; Nyom (yellow card) 35'; Barry (yellow card) 53'; McClean (yellow card) 90+5'	Stadium: John Smith's Stadium; Attendance: 24,169 (2,340 away); Referee: Roger East

18 November 2017 12	West Bromwich Albion	0–4	Chelsea	West Bromwich
15:00 GMT	Rondón (yellow card) 54'; Yacob (yellow card) 88'	Report	Morata 17' (yellow card) 90'; Hazard (yellow card) 19' (goal) 23', 62'; Alonso 38'; Fàbregas (yellow card) 50'	Stadium: The Hawthorns; Attendance: 23,592 (2,600 away); Referee: Jonathan Moss

25 November 2017 13	Tottenham Hotspur	1–1	West Bromwich Albion	London
15:00 GMT	Dier (yellow card) 58'; Kane 74'	Report	Rondón 4'; Barry (yellow card) 26'; Gibbs (yellow card) 60'; Nyom (yellow card) 77'; Foster (yellow card) 82'	Stadium: Wembley; Attendance: 65,905 (3,062 away); Referee: Mike Jones

28 November 2017 14	West Bromwich Albion	2–2	Newcastle United	West Bromwich
20:00 GMT	Robson-Kanu 45'+1'; Field 56'	Report	Clark 59'; Evans 83' (o.g.)	Stadium: The Hawthorns; Attendance: 25,534 (2,581 away); Referee: Lee Probert

2 December 2017 15	West Bromwich Albion	0–0	Crystal Palace	West Bromwich
15:00 GMT	Livermore (yellow card) 64'; Field (yellow card) 90+2'; Nyom (yellow card) 90+4'	Report	Ward (yellow card) 76'	Stadium: The Hawthorns; Attendance: 23,531 (2,208 away); Referee: Michael Oliver

9 December 2017 16	Swansea City	1–0	West Bromwich Albion	Swansea
15:00 GMT	Carroll (yellow card) 51'; Bony 81'; Mesa (yellow card) 86'	Report	Yacob (yellow card) 16'; Field (yellow card) 35'; Robson-Kanu (yellow card) 78'; Evans (yellow card) 84'; Brunt (yellow card) 88'	Stadium: Liberty Stadium; Attendance: 19,580 (1,032 away); Referee: Mike Dean

13 December 2017 17	Liverpool	0–0	West Bromwich Albion	Liverpool
20:00 GMT	Can (yellow card) 68'	Report	Field (yellow card) 90+2'	Stadium: Anfield; Attendance: 53,243 (1,083 away); Referee: Paul Tierney

17 December 2017 18	West Bromwich Albion	1–2	Manchester United	West Bromwich
14:15 GMT	Barry 77'; Rondón (yellow card) 90+5'	Report	Lukaku 27'; Lingard 35'; Rashford (yellow card) 53'; Matić (yellow card) 90+3'; Rojo (yellow card) 90+5'	Stadium: The Hawthorns; Attendance: 24,782 (2,600 away); Referee: Anthony Taylor

23 December 2017 19	Stoke City	3–1	West Bromwich Albion	Stoke-on-Trent
15:00 GMT	Allen 19'; Choupo-Moting 45+2'; Sobhi 90+5' (yellow card) 90+6'	Report	Rondón 51'	Stadium: bet365 Stadium; Attendance: 29,057 (2,078 away); Referee: Neil Swarbrick

26 December 2017 20	West Bromwich Albion	0–0	Everton	West Bromwich
15:00 GMT	Dawson (yellow card) 68'; Barry (yellow card) 79'	Report		Stadium: The Hawthorns; Attendance: 25,364 (2,600 away); Referee: Roger East

31 December 2017 21	West Bromwich Albion	1–1	Arsenal	West Bromwich
16:30 GMT	Evans (yellow card) 34'; Brunt (yellow card) 59'; Dawson (yellow card) 82'; Rodriguez 89' (pen.)	Report	Mustafi (yellow card) 58'; McClean 83' (o.g.); Wilshere (yellow card) 88'; Čech (yellow card) 90+5'	Stadium: The Hawthorns; Attendance: 26,223 (2,594 away); Referee: Mike Dean

2 January 2018 22	West Ham United	2–1	West Bromwich Albion	Stratford, London
19:45 GMT	Lanzini (yellow card) 6'; Masuaku (yellow card) 44'; Carroll 59', 90+4' (yellow card) 61'	Report	McClean 30'; Yacob (yellow card) 74'; Krychowiak (yellow card) 90+6'	Stadium: London Stadium; Attendance: 56,888 (1,063 away); Referee: Mike Jones

13 January 2018 23	West Bromwich Albion	2–0	Brighton & Hove Albion	West Bromwich
15:00 GMT	Evans 4'; Dawson 55'	Report		Stadium: The Hawthorns; Attendance: 25,240 (2,595 away); Referee: Martin Atkinson

20 January 2018 24	Everton	1–1	West Bromwich Albion	Liverpool
15:00 GMT	Walcott (yellow card) 45+1'; Schneiderlin (yellow card) 58'; Niasse 70'	Report	Rodriguez 7'; Dawson (yellow card) 88'	Stadium: Goodison Park; Attendance: 39,061; Referee: Stuart Attwell

31 January 2018 25	Manchester City	3–0	West Bromwich Albion	Manchester
20:00 GMT	Fernandinho 19'; Silva (yellow card) 32'; De Bruyne 68'; Agüero 89'	Report	McClean (yellow card) 69'; Rondón (yellow card) 75'; Phillips (yellow card) 85'	Stadium: City of Manchester Stadium; Attendance: 53,241 (901 away); Referee: Robert Madley

3 February 2018 26	West Bromwich Albion	2–3	Southampton	West Bromwich
15:00 GMT	Hegazi 4'; Barry (yellow card) 22'; Rondón 72'; Phillips (yellow card) 90+2'	Report	Lemina 40'; Stephens 43'; Ward-Prowse 55'; Bertrand (yellow card) 90+2'	Stadium: The Hawthorns; Attendance: 25,911 (2,031 away); Referee: Michael Oliver

12 February 2018 27	Chelsea	3–0	West Bromwich Albion	Fulham
20:00 GMT	Hazard 25', 71'; Moses 63'	Report	Evans (yellow card) 45+3'; Gibbs (yellow card) 49'	Stadium: Stamford Bridge; Attendance: 41,071; Referee: Lee Mason

24 February 2018 28	West Bromwich Albion	1–2	Huddersfield Town	West Bromwich
15:00 GMT	Dawson 64'; Evans (yellow card) 83'	Report	Hadergjonaj (yellow card) 30' van La Parra 48'; Mounié 56'	Stadium: The Hawthorns; Attendance: 25,920 (2,597 away); Referee: Jonathan Moss

3 March 2018 29	Watford	1–0	West Bromwich Albion	Watford
15:00 GMT	Capoue (yellow card) 25'; Mariappa (yellow card) 72'; Deeney 77'	Report		Stadium: Vicarage Road; Attendance: 20,022 (2,074 away); Referee: Paul Tierney

10 March 2018 30	West Bromwich Albion	1–4	Leicester City	West Bromwich
15:00 GMT	Rondón 8'; Livermore (yellow card) 80'	Report	Vardy 21', (yellow card) 41'; Simpson (yellow card) 53'; Mahrez 62'; Ndidi (yellow card) 73'; Iheanacho 76'; Iborra 90+3'	Stadium: The Hawthorns; Attendance: 23,558 (2,600 away); Referee: Bobby Madley

17 March 2018 31	AFC Bournemouth	2–1	West Bromwich Albion	Bournemouth
15:00 GMT	Smith (yellow card) 53'; Ibe 77'; Stanislas 89'	Report	Livermore (yellow card) 34'; Rodriguez 49'; Dawson (yellow card) 87'	Stadium: Dean Court; Attendance: 10,242; Referee: Graham Scott

31 March 2018 32	West Bromwich Albion	1–2	Burnley	West Bromwich
15:00 BST	Rondón 83'; Yacob (yellow card) 90+3'	Report	Barnes 22' (yellow card) 54'; Chris Wood 73'; Cork (yellow card) 79'; Pope (yellow card) 90+5'	Stadium: The Hawthorns; Attendance: 23,455 (2,593 away); Referee: Lee Probert

7 April 2018 33	West Bromwich Albion	1–1	Swansea City	West Bromwich
15:00 BST	Brunt (yellow card) 50'; Rodriguez 54'; Phillips (yellow card) 87'; McClean (yellow card) 90'	Report	Clucas (yellow card) 55'; Abraham 75'; Bartley (yellow card) 90'	Stadium: The Hawthorns; Attendance: 23,297 (2,597 away); Referee: Roger East

15 April 2018 34	Manchester United	0–1	West Bromwich Albion	Manchester
16:00 BST	Pogba (yellow card) 29'	Report	Rodriguez 73'; Nyom (yellow card) 77'	Stadium: Old Trafford; Attendance: 75,095; Referee: Paul Tierney

21 April 2018 35	West Bromwich Albion	2–2	Liverpool	West Bromwich
12:30 BST	Livermore 79'; Rondón 88'	Report	Ings 4'; Moreno (yellow card) 69'; Salah 72'	Stadium: The Hawthorns; Attendance: 24,520 (2,600 away); Referee: Stuart Attwell

28 April 2018 36	Newcastle United	0–1	West Bromwich Albion	Newcastle upon Tyne
15:00 BST	Diamé (yellow card) 68'	Report	Phillips 29'; Livermore (yellow card) 37'; Nyom (yellow card) 45+1'; McClean (yellow card) 82'	Stadium: St James' Park; Attendance: 52,283 (1,027 away); Referee: David Coote

5 May 2018 37	West Bromwich Albion	1–0	Tottenham Hotspur	West Bromwich
15:00 BST	Hegazi (yellow card) 61'; Nyom (yellow card) 65'; McClean (yellow card) 79'; Brunt (yellow card) 82'; Livermore 90+2'	Report	Rose (yellow card) 65'	Stadium: The Hawthorns; Attendance: 23,685 (2,589 away); Referee: Mike Jones

13 May 2018 38	Crystal Palace	2–0	West Bromwich Albion	Selhurst
15:00 BST	Tomkins (yellow card) 48'; McArthur (yellow card) 68'; Zaha 70' van Aanholt 78'	Report	Brunt (yellow card) 45+2'; Dawson (yellow card) 55'; Gibbs (yellow card) 81'	Stadium: Selhurst Park; Attendance: 25,357; Referee: Jonathan Moss

== Cup competitions ==
=== FA Cup ===
The FA Cup is English football's primary cup competition and was first held in 1871–72. West Bromwich Albion have won the competition five times, most recently in 1968; the 2017–18 season marks the 50th anniversary of that campaign as well as being Albion's 125th season in the FA Cup. As a Premier League club, Albion entered the 2017–18 FA Cup at the third round stage and were drawn away to either Exeter City or Forest Green Rovers. The former won the replayed tie 2–1 (a.e.t.) and advanced through to host WBA. Albion had not faced Exeter in any competition since a league match in 1993 and the two sides had never previously met in the FA Cup. The game finished 2–0 to the away side thanks to first half goals from Salomón Rondón and Jay Rodriguez, while Hal Robson-Kanu missed a penalty. Pardew got his first win in charge in this clash, which also ended Albion's 21-game winless run in all competitions.

West Bromwich Albion's fourth-round match against Liverpool at Anfield was moved to a Saturday night slot for live screening on BT Sport. It became the first official game in the club's history to use a video assistant referee. The newly introduced technology did bring great impact to the process of the game, where referee Craig Pawson disallowed a West Brom goal and awarded Liverpool a penalty with VAR's assistance. But a brace from Jay Rodriguez and a Joël Matip own goal still saw a dramatic 3–2 victory to Albion. Albion were later eliminated by Southampton in the fifth round, albeit Rondon scoring a goal of the season contender.

6 January 2018 Third round	Exeter City	0–2	West Bromwich Albion	Exeter
15:00 GMT	Sweeney (yellow card) 42'; Archibald-Henville (yellow card) 53'	Report	Rondón 2'; Rodriguez 25', (yellow card) 64'; Robson-Kanu (penalty missed) 42'	Stadium: St James Park; Attendance: 5,638 (1,200 away); Referee: Lee Mason

27 January 2018 Fourth round	Liverpool	2–3	West Bromwich Albion	Liverpool
19:45 GMT	Firmino 5' (penalty missed) 27'; Can (yellow card) 61'; Salah 78'	Report	Rodriguez 7', 11'; Barry (yellow card) 26'; Matip 45+2' (o.g.); Dawson (yellow card) 83'; Hegazi (yellow card) 85'	Stadium: Anfield; Attendance: 53,342 (1,900 away); Referee: Craig Pawson

17 February 2018 Fifth round	West Bromwich Albion	1–2	Southampton	West Bromwich
15:00 GMT	Krychowiak (yellow card) 30'; McClean (yellow card) 42'; Rondón 58'	Report	Hoedt 11'; Carrillo (yellow card) 45+1'; Tadić 56'; Lemina (yellow card) 75'	Stadium: The Hawthorns; Attendance: 17,600 (2,572 away); Referee: Chris Kavanagh

=== EFL Cup ===
English football's secondary cup competition is the EFL Cup and is contested by the 92 clubs of the Premier League and English Football League. It was the 53rd season in which Albion took part in the competition formerly known as the Football League Cup, which they won at their first attempt in 1966 but had not won since. As one of the Premier League clubs not involved in European competition, Albion entered the 2017–18 EFL Cup at the second round stage, where they were drawn away to Accrington Stanley. Goals from Salomón Rondón, Matt Phillips and Jay Rodriguez—his first for the club—ensured Albion's progression into the next round, while Tom Dallison scored a late consolation for the home side. West Brom were captained by new signing Gareth Barry. In the third round, Albion faced Manchester City at home. Midfielder Claudio Yacob scored for the first time in almost three years but two goals from City's Leroy Sané meant that West Brom were eliminated from the competition.

22 August 2017 Second round	Accrington Stanley	1–3	West Bromwich Albion	Accrington
19:45 BST	Dallison 88'	Report	Rondón 11'; McClean (yellow card) 30'; Phillips 31'; Rodriguez 64'	Stadium: Crown Ground; Attendance: 2,699 (1,345 away); Referee: Jeremy Simpson

20 September 2017 Third round	West Bromwich Albion	1–2	Manchester City	West Bromwich
20:00 BST	Yacob (yellow card) 54' (goal) 72'	Report	Sané 3', 77' (yellow card) 59'; Delph (yellow card) 45'; Sterling (yellow card) 66'; Danilo (yellow card) 85'	Stadium: The Hawthorns; Attendance: 14,953 (3,246 away); Referee: Mike Jones

== Statistics ==
=== Appearances and goals ===
Last updated on 14 May 2018.

No.	Pos	Nat	Player	Total		Premier League		EFL Cup		FA Cup	
No.	Pos	Nat	Player	Apps	Goals	Apps	Goals	Apps	Goals	Apps	Goals
1	GK	(England) ENG	Ben Foster	41	-61	37	-55	1	-2	3	-4
2	DF	(Cameroon) CMR	Allan Nyom	33	0	29	0	2	0	2	0
3	DF	(England) ENG	Kieran Gibbs	36	0	33	0	1	0	2	0
4	FW	(Wales) WAL	Hal Robson-Kanu	24	2	21	2	1	0	2	0
5	MF	(Argentina) ARG	Claudio Yacob	18	1	16	0	1	1	1	0
6	DF	(Northern Ireland) NIR	Jonny Evans	31	2	28	2	1	0	2	0
7	MF	(Scotland) SCO	James Morrison	6	1	4	1	2	0	0	0
8	MF	(England) ENG	Jake Livermore	37	2	34	2	1	0	2	0
9	FW	(Venezuela) VEN	Salomón Rondón	40	10	36	7	2	1	2	2
10	MF	(Scotland) SCO	Matt Phillips	34	3	30	2	2	1	2	0
11	MF	(Northern Ireland) NIR	Chris Brunt	29	0	26	0	0	0	3	0
13	GK	(Wales) WAL	Boaz Myhill	2	-2	1	-1	1	-1	0	0
14	MF	(Republic of Ireland) IRL	James McClean	34	1	30	1	2	0	2	0
15	FW	(England) ENG	Daniel Sturridge	6	0	6	0	0	0	0	0
16	DF	(Egypt) EGY	Ali Gabr	0	0	0	0	0	0	0	0
17	FW	(Scotland) SCO	Oliver Burke	16	0	15	0	0	0	1	0
18	MF	(England) ENG	Gareth Barry	29	1	25	1	1	0	3	0
19	FW	(England) ENG	Jay Rodriguez	42	11	37	7	2	1	3	3
20	MF	(Poland) POL	Grzegorz Krychowiak	31	0	27	0	1	0	3	0
22	MF	(Belgium) BEL	Nacer Chadli	6	1	5	1	1	0	0	0
23	DF	(Northern Ireland) NIR	Gareth McAuley	12	0	9	0	1	0	2	0
25	DF	(England) ENG	Craig Dawson	32	2	28	2	2	0	2	0
26	DF	(Egypt) EGY	Ahmed Hegazy	42	2	38	2	1	0	3	0
28	MF	(England) ENG	Sam Field	12	1	10	1	0	0	2	0
40	GK	(England) ENG	Alex Palmer	0	0	0	0	0	0	0	0
50	DF	(Republic of Ireland) IRL	Dara O'Shea	0	0	0	0	0	0	0	0
Players who left during the season
34	MF	(England) ENG	Rekeem Harper (on loan at Blackburn Rovers)	2	0	0+1	0	0+1	0	0	0
45	MF	(England) ENG	Jonathan Leko (on loan at Bristol City)	1	0	0	0	0+1	0	0	0
49	DF	(England) ENG	Kane Wilson (on loan at Exeter City)	0	0	0	0	0	0	0	0

=== Cards ===
Accounts for all competitions. Last updated on 18 December 2017.

No.	Pos.	Name	Yellow card	Red card
1	GK	(England) Ben Foster	2	0
2	DF	(Cameroon) Allan Nyom	4	0
3	DF	(England) Kieran Gibbs	1	0
4	FW	(Wales) Hal Robson-Kanu	2	1
5	MF	(Argentina) Claudio Yacob	3	0
6	DF	(Northern Ireland) Jonny Evans	4	0
8	MF	(England) Jake Livermore	2	0
9	FW	(Venezuela) Salomón Rondón	3	0
11	MF	(Northern Ireland) Chris Brunt	1	0
13	GK	(Wales) Boaz Myhill	1	0
14	MF	(Republic of Ireland) James McClean	4	0
18	MF	(England) Gareth Barry	2	0
19	FW	(England) Jay Rodriguez	2	0
20	MF	(Poland) Grzegorz Krychowiak	1	0
22	MF	(Belgium) Nacer Chadli	1	0
25	DF	(Northern Ireland) Gareth McAuley	1	0
26	DF	(Egypt) Ahmed Hegazi	3	0
28	MF	(England) Sam Field	3	0

=== Clean sheets ===
Last updated on 27 May 2018.

Number	Nation	Name	Matches Played	Premier League	EFL Cup	FA Cup	Total
1	(England)	Ben Foster	41	10	0	1	11
13	(Wales)	Boaz Myhill	2	0	0	0	0
40	(England)	Alex Palmer	0	0	0	0	0
TOTALS				10	0	1	11

== Legacy ==
The season was covered by the Channel 4 documentary series, Artist in Residence, in the episode entitled "The Football Club". It follows portrait artist Tai-Shan Schierenberg as he paints players, management and fans of the club. A week after the season ended, Albion made the first presentations from their caps project. The blue caps feature the club's original crest from 1884 as well as a unique number denoting the order of each player's league debut for the team. They will be given to every player—or where deceased, to surviving family members—to have represented West Bromwich Albion in league football. The first caps awarded honoured members of Albion's 1968 FA Cup-winning team.
