= Lai Guochuan =

Chinese businessman

- Born: 1974 (age 51–52); Meizhou, Guangdong, China
- Occupations: Entrepreneur, Investor
- Organization(s): Founder & Director of Yunyi Guokai (Shanghai) Sports Development Limited
- Known for: Former controlling shareholder of West Bromwich Albion F.C.
- Predecessor: Jeremy Peace

Lai Guochuan (Chinese: 赖国传; pinyin: Lài Guóchuán; born 1974) is a Chinese businessman and investor.

Lai is the controlling shareholder and director of private investment firm Yunyi Guokai (Shanghai) Sports Development Limited, founded to take the majority shareholding of English football club West Bromwich Albion. His time as controlling shareholder of the club was marked by several controversies and fan protests.

Lai gained his wealth through his position as general manager and shareholder of Palm Eco-Town Development Company, which developed from a small plant nursery business into China's largest landscape development and construction firm over his two decades of stewardship. Following his departure from Palm, Lai focused on private investment, but remains heavily connected to the company and serves as a director of a number of its subsidiaries.

== Background and career ==
Lai was born in Meizhou, Guangdong, China. He resides in Guangzhou, a city in the Guangdong province of China.

Lai served as General Manager of Palm Eco-Town Development Company Limited for over 20 years. During this time the company grew from a plant nursery into one of China's largest and most successful landscape development and construction companies. Lai stepped down from this role in 2014 to focus on private investment projects, yet retained a close link with Palm and remains director of a number of subsidiaries including Belt Collins International (HK) Limited, Palm Landscape (Hong Kong) Limited, Hangzhou Nanyue Palm Landscape Construction Limited and PALM Design Holding.

== Controlling shareholding of West Bromwich Albion F.C. ==
Little is known about Lai, and the extent of his role in the investment in, and running of, West Bromwich Albion. He has attended only a handful of the club's matches.

=== Purchase ===
In July 2016, Yunyi Guokai (Shanghai) Sports Development Limited, headed by Lai, agreed to purchase West Bromwich Albion F.C. from Jeremy Peace for a figure reported to be between £175m - £200m. The deal was completed on 15 September 2016. Yunyi Guokai (Shanghai) Sports Development Limited group was formed in order to purchase the club, with the group's funding coming from three different sources. The majority of the funds equating to 59% of the total were reportedly provided by Lai himself, 23% of the funds were provided by Chinese investment group Yunyi Investment and the remaining 18% were provided by Lai's former firm Palm. Lai, following the recommendations of departing owner Jeremy Peace, appointed former Blackburn Rovers chairman John Williams as the new chairman of the club, and former Stoke City Chief Executive Martin Goodman as CEO.

Palm acted as the club's shirt sponsor for the 2017–18 season and sponsored the club's Walsall training ground, which was renamed the Palm Training Ground. Both sponsorships were abruptly terminated following the club's relegation from the Premier League at the end of the 2017–18 season.

==== Early Premier League seasons ====
In the first season of Lai's shareholding, the 2016–17 season, the club finished 10th in the Premier League. Lai endearing himself to fans in the early days of his ownership, through his decision to give every fan at the first away game of the season a free scarf, and every fan at the first home game of the season a free drink.

However, the following season was marred by various issues both on and off the field. Results declined under the management of Tony Pulis, who was sacked. Replacement Alan Pardew was unable to arrest the slide in results that the club had been experiencing and presided over embarrassing off-field controversies. The most notable incident was what became known as 'Taxi Gate', when four senior players were alleged to have stolen a taxi during a mid-season training break in Barcelona. Pardew was sacked before the end of the season. These failures contributed to an overwhelmingly negative season, which culminated in the club's relegation to the Championship after eight consecutive seasons in the Premier League. Chairman John Williams, CEO Martin Goodman, and Technical Director Nick Hammond were sacked by Lai due to issues relating to transfers in the build up to the 2017–18 season, and their decision to appoint Alan Pardew as manager.

==== Post-2018 relegation and 2020 promotion ====
Lai named associate Li Piyue as Chairman after the club's relegation in the 2017–18 season. Lai himself later took over as chairman on 2 February 2022. Prior to their first season back in the Championship, club legend Darren Moore was appointed as the club's new head coach, following a spell as caretaker manager towards the end of the club's relegation season. During this time Albion had gone unbeaten, and enjoyed victories over Tottenham Hotspur at The Hawthorns and Manchester United at Old Trafford, only narrowly missing out on survival in the Premier League. The decisions to appoint Moore and Li were part of Lai and the board's desire to re-establish a connection with the fans and establish greater control over proceedings at the club. However Moore was controversially sacked late into the 2018–19 season with the club sitting in 4th place in the table. The club eventually lost the Championship play-off semi-final against Aston Villa on penalties. During the season, Luke Dowling became the club's Technical director.

Slaven Bilić took over as boss on 13 June 2019, and led Albion to automatic promotion back to the Premier League during the 2019–20 season. Lai had previously been interested in appointing Bilić following the sacking of Tony Pulis during Albion's relegation season.

Back in the Premier League, Lai made associate Xu Ke the club's CEO. The popular Bilić was controversially sacked on 16 December 2020, with Sam Allardyce named as his replacement the same day. After Albion were relegated from the Premier League at the end of the 2020–21 season, Allardyce resigned from his position.

==== Post-2021 relegation ====
The board, led by Technical director Luke Dowling, chose to name Chris Wilder as the club's new manager. However, the decision was vetoed by Lai. In the aftermath, Luke Dowling left the club by mutual consent. With managerial recruitment now headed by Xu Ke, Valérien Ismaël was appointed as manager on a four-year contract. But he was sacked on 2 February 2022, with the team falling out of the play-off places. Steve Bruce was appointed Manager the following day. At this time, Lai named himself chairman, and Ron Gourlay became the club's CEO, with Xu Ke being moved down to a non-executive director position.

The club's results continued to trend downwards under Steve Bruce, who was sacked with club in the relegation places in the 2022–23 season. Former Marcelo Bielsa understudy Carlos Corberán was named as successor on 25 October. The season also saw increased scrutiny of the club's ownership, and the practices of majority shareholder Guochuan Lai. The club's financial situation began to receive national media attention, having already been commented on frequently in local press. Supporter action groups and in-stadium protests by fans to raise awareness of the club's off-field issues took shape during the season.

=== Financial controversies ===
==== Matheus Pereira transfer ====
On 29 June 2021, FIFA stated they would begin an investigation into the attempted brokering of a £25m transfer of West Bromwich Albion player Matheus Pereira to an unnamed Chinese Super League club. The attempted deal, reported by The Times, was instigated by then Technical Director Luke Dowling, and would have been a violation of FIFA regulations. The proposal reportedly sought to avoid the payment of tax in China and the UK, enabling the club's majority shareholder, Lai, to personally keep proceeds of the sale.

==== 2021 £4.95m loan to Wisdom Smart Corporation and missed repayments ====
Following the late release of club accounts for the year 2020–2021, it was revealed that Lai had loaned £4.95m from West Bromwich Albion to another of his companies, Wisdom Smart Corporation Limited, during the COVID-19 pandemic with a fixed interest payment of £50,000. It was also revealed that the initial deadline for repayment, 15 September 2021, had been missed. A new deadline for repayment set at 31 December 2022, with Lai assuring that the money would be returned in a statement following the publication of the accounts. This second loan repayment deadline was then also defaulted on.

==== 2021 £2m Warmfront Holdings Loan ====
The delayed release of the club's 2020–2021 accounts also showed Lai, via his company West Bromwich Albion Holdings, had borrowed £2m from Warmfront Holdings on 8 September 2021. While the football club are neither the lender or beneficiary of the loan, the loaned money went into West Bromwich Albion Holdings, and was secured against 2.35% of Lai's shareholdings in the football club.

==== 2022 MSD Holdings club loan ====
On 28 December 2022, it was announced that the club had agreed to take out a £20m loan from MSD Holdings, to be taken out over four years, and secured against "all group assets", including the club's stadium, training facilities and players. In a statement from director Xu Ke, the loan is to finance the club's "general business operations". The loan's interest rate was reported to potentially be over 10%. The revelation led to increased unrest and concern from the club's minority shareholders, and West Bromwich Albion supporters as a whole. This ire further increased after Lai failed to repay the low-interest £4.95m he had removed from club in 2021, and the club was now taking out a high-interest loan to cover "day-to-day running".

=== 2022 & 2023 Fan Protests ===
The 2022–23 season saw increased scrutiny of the club's ownership, and the practices of majority shareholder Lai Guochan. The club's financial situation began to receive national media attention, having already been commented on frequently in local press. Supporter action groups and in-stadium protests by fans to raise awareness of the club's off-field issues took shape during the season.

In October 2022, a supporter group named Action For Albion began organising protests against Lai and the board. In-stadium protests included regular Shine a light protests, intending to 'shine a light' on the club's off-field ownership situation. On 2 January 2023, an estimated 3000 fans peacefully protested outside the stadium's director's entrance on Halfords Lane.
