= Jeremy Peace =

Football chairman

Jeremy Roland Peace
- Born: 13 August 1956 (age 69); West Bromwich, England
- Known for: Former owner of West Bromwich Albion F.C
- Predecessor: Paul Thompson
- Successor: Guochuan Lai

Jeremy Roland Peace (born 13 August 1956) is a British businessman, and the former chairman and owner of West Bromwich Albion F.C, a professional football club in the West Midlands, England.

== Biography ==
Jeremy Peace was born 13 August 1956 in West Bromwich and educated at Shrewsbury School. He worked in accountancy, as a stockbroker and in investment banking between 1974 and 1983. Until 1991, he was a major shareholder and director of Morland Securities PLC (later renamed Access Satellite International PLC) and then of Sangers Photographics PLC (later renamed Quadrant Group PLC).

Since that time, Peace has been a director and/or shareholder in various public limited companies, namely South Country Homes, Thomas Potts, London Town, e-primefinancial, EP&F Capital, Galahad Capital, Camelot Capital and formerly West Bromwich Albion F.C.

== West Bromwich Albion ==
Peace joined the board of West Bromwich Albion as a non-executive director on 8 December 2000, and became chairman in June 2002, following the resignation of Paul Thompson. The Company was taken private in 2005, with him owning a majority shareholding.

On 31 May 2013, Peace transferred his 59.9 per cent shareholding in West Bromwich Albion Group Limited to a new company, West Bromwich Albion Holdings Limited. Peace was the sole director of West Bromwich Albion Holdings Limited and owned 100% of the new company. The Companies House return for West Bromwich Albion Holdings Limited dated 10 June 2015 shows that whilst Peace owned 100% of the Ordinary Share Capital, a new class of "A" Ordinary Shares has been created. Kappa Limited owns 12,500 of these shares, and is the sole shareholder in this class.

In August 2016 Peace finalised a deal with Chinese businessman Guochuan Lai to sell West Bromwich Albion for a figure believed to be in the region of £150m to £200m. Peace's role as chairman was taken up by former Blackburn Rovers chairman John Williams. However, Peace agreed to stay at Albion for the 2016–17 Premier League season, in an advisory capacity.
