= Dušan Tadić =

Serbian footballer (born 1988)

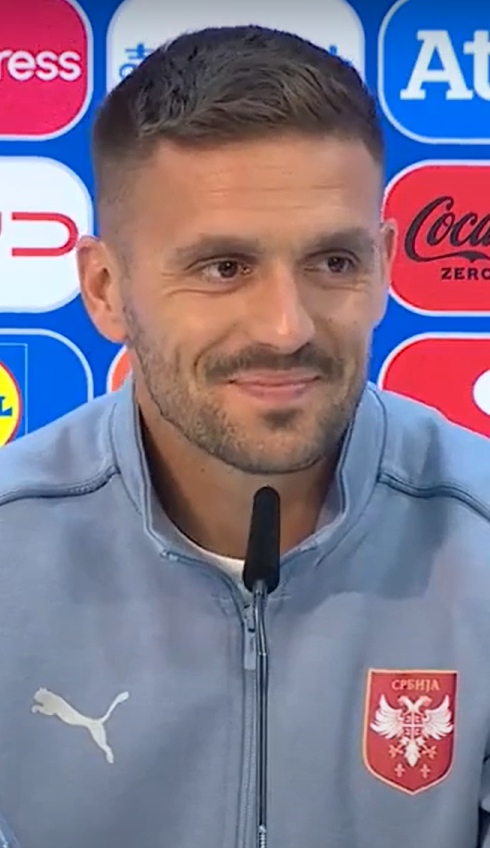
- Tadić with Serbia at UEFA Euro 2024

Personal information
- Full name: Dušan Tadić
- Date of birth: 20 November 1988 (age 38)
- Place of birth: Bačka Topola, SR Serbia, SFR Yugoslavia
- Height: 1.81 m (5 ft 11 in)
- Positions: Attacking midfielder; forward

Team information
- Current team: NEC
- Number: 10

Youth career
- AIK Bačka Topola
- 2002–2006: Vojvodina

Senior career*
Years	Team	Apps	(Gls)
2006–2010	Vojvodina	107	(29)
2010–2012	Groningen	68	(14)
2012–2014	Twente	66	(28)
2014–2018	Southampton	134	(21)
2018–2023	Ajax	161	(77)
2023–2025	Fenerbahçe	73	(21)
2025–2026	Al Wahda	25	(1)
2026–	NEC	9	(2)

International career^{‡}
2007	Serbia U19	5	(3)
2007–2010	Serbia U21	24	(1)
2008	Serbia U23	3	(0)
2008–	Serbia	117	(23)
- * Club domestic league appearances and goals as of 23:32, 21 November 2026 (UTC) ‡ National team caps and goals as of 22:50, 16 November 2026 (UTC)

Dušan Tadić (Serbian Cyrillic: Душан Тадић, pronounced [dǔʃan tǎdiːtɕ]; born 20 November 1988) is a Serbian professional footballer who plays as an attacking midfielder or forward for Eredivisie club NEC Nijmegen and the Serbia national team.

After starting at hometown club AIK Bačka Topola, Tadić spent most of his formative years at Vojvodina and made his senior debut in 2006 at the age of 17. After two seasons with Groningen he joined Twente in 2012, where he earned a move to Southampton of the Premier League. After four years in England, he returned to the Netherlands in 2018 with Ajax. With the club, Tadić went on to win three Eredivisie and two KNVB Cup titles, the 2018–19 Eredivisie Golden Boot, and the 2020–21 Eredivisie Player of the Season award. He left Ajax with 105 goals and 112 assists in 241 matches, joining Fenerbahçe in 2023.

Internationally, Tadić has made a record 117 appearances for Serbia, having made his international debut in 2008; he represented the country at the Olympics in that year, as well as at the FIFA World Cup in 2018 and 2022, and the UEFA European Championship in 2024.

== Club career ==
=== Vojvodina ===
Tadić is a youth product of his hometown club, AIK Bačka Topola. Eventually, he signed a professional contract with Vojvodina and played his first competitive matches in the Meridian SuperLiga at the age of 17. While playing for Vojvodina, he gained invaluable experience playing against various top flight teams – including Atlético Madrid – and playing almost four full seasons without any major injuries or incidents. In the 2009–10 UEFA Europa League qualifying phase, he scored a goal against Austria Wien.

=== Groningen ===
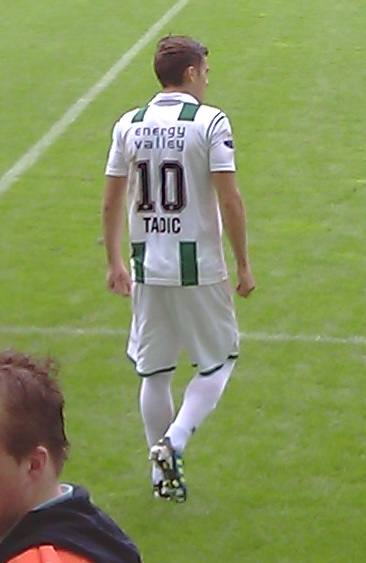
Tadić playing for Groningen in 2011

In 2010, Vojvodina sold Dušan Tadić to Groningen for the equivalent of €1.23 million. On 8 August 2010, Tadić made his official debut for the club in an Eredivisie match against Ajax, playing the full match and providing the assist for Tim Matavž's goal in a 2–2 home draw. On 18 December 2010, Tadić scored his first goal for Groningen, against Excelsior in a 2–2 away draw. On 30 January 2011, he scored twice and provided one assist in a 1–4 away league victory against Heerenveen. Tadić finished the 2010–11 season with 7 goals, and 22 assists in 41 matches. He had the third highest number of assists in Europe for the 2010–11 season. Only Mesut Özil (26) and Lionel Messi (28) registered more assists. Tadić played for Groningen from 2010 to 2012 before being transferred to Twente.

=== Twente ===
On 10 April 2012, it was announced that Tadić had signed for Twente in a €7.7 million move from Groningen. In his debut match on 12 August, he scored two goals against his former club. He finished his debut season as the team's second-highest scorer with 16 goals in all competitions, two less than Nacer Chadli. In the following season, Tadić again scored 16 goals across all competitions, being the team's top scorer.

=== Southampton ===
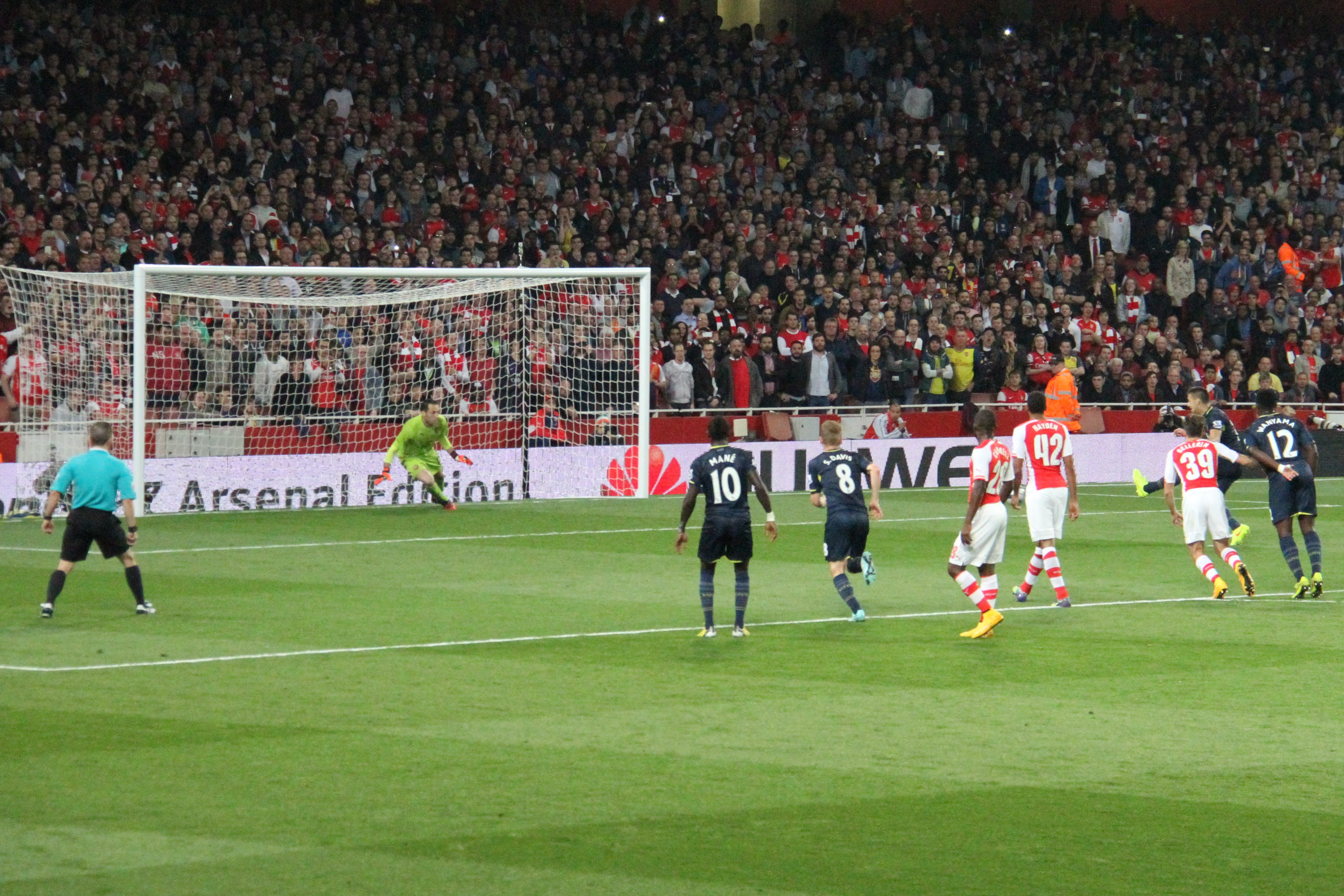
Tadić scoring a penalty, his first goal for Southampton, as they defeated Arsenal in 2014

On 8 July 2014, Tadić became the first signing under new Southampton manager Ronald Koeman on a four-year contract. He joined for an undisclosed fee, thought to be £10.9 million. He made his competitive debut on 17 August in their first match of the Premier League season, playing 74 minutes of a 2–1 defeat against Liverpool, only to be replaced by fellow debutant Shane Long. Tadić assisted Southampton's goal in a 1–2 victory with goalscorer Nathaniel Clyne.

Tadić scored his first Southampton goal on 23 September with a penalty against Arsenal in a 2–1 League Cup victory at Emirates Stadium. On 18 October, he scored his first league goal in an 8–0 victory against Sunderland on 18 October, in which he assisted four others, equalling the Premier League record for the most assists in a single match.

On 13 December, Tadić's penalty was saved by Tom Heaton as Southampton went on to lose 1–0 away against Burnley. He scored in a 2–0 win over Arsenal on 1 January 2015, and ten days later scored the only goal as Southampton defeated Manchester United at Old Trafford and rose into third position at their expense. This marked Southampton's first league victory at Old Trafford since 1988. On 30 August 2015, Tadić scored twice in a 3–0 win against Norwich City for the Saints' first league win of the season.

On 23 April 2016, Tadić scored another brace in a 4–2 victory against Aston Villa, who were already relegated. In the next match, he provided three assists in a 4–2 victory against Manchester City, becoming only the fourth player to achieve three or more assists in more than one Premier League game.

=== Ajax ===
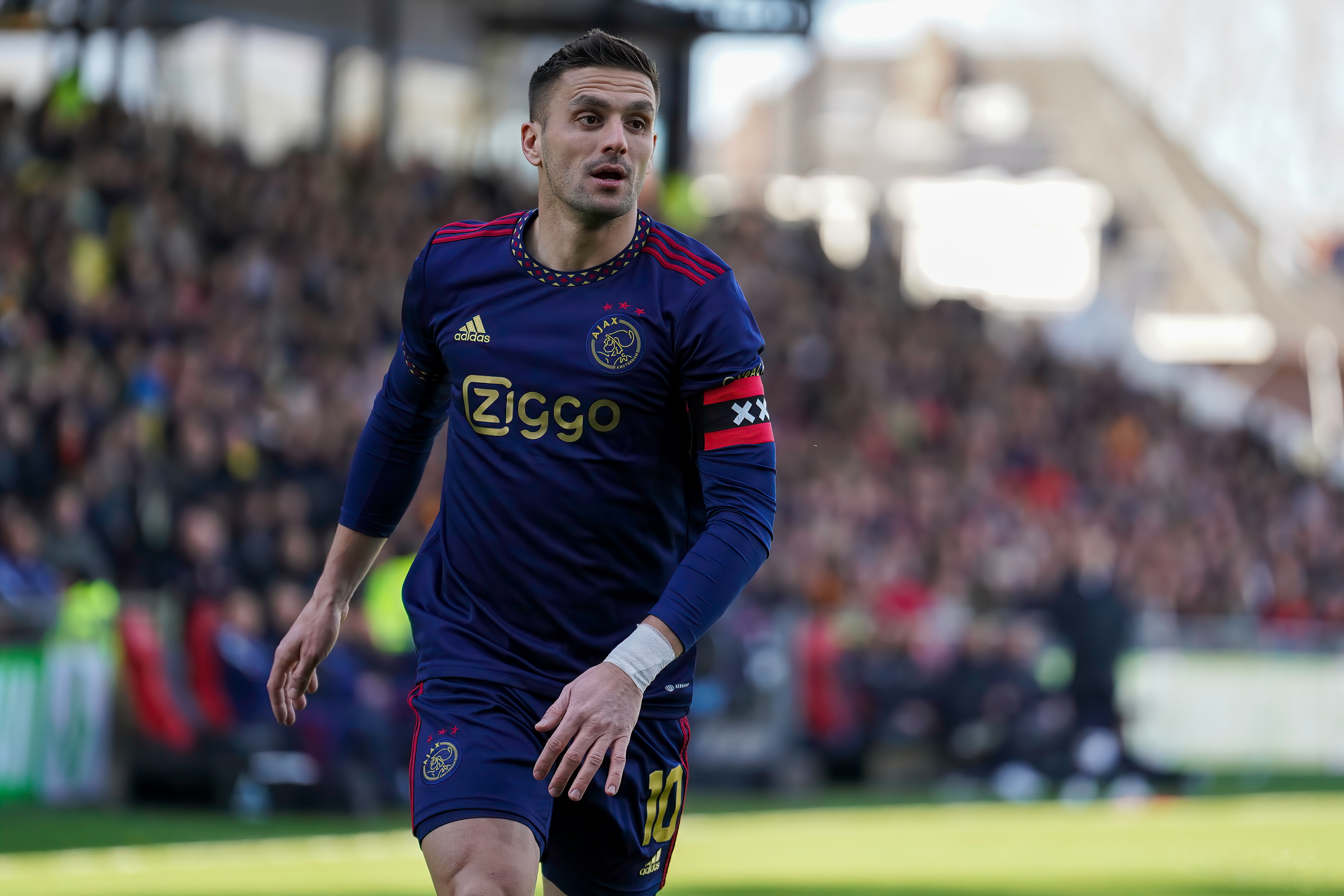
Tadić captaining Ajax in 2023

Tadić signed for Dutch club Ajax in June 2018. The club paid a transfer sum of €11.4 million, which could reach €13.7 million based on variables.

On 5 March 2019, Tadić's goal, two assists, and earning the Man of the Match performance helped knock Real Madrid out of the last 16 of the Champions League, as Ajax unexpectedly won 4–1 at the Santiago Bernabéu Stadium. The Spanish club had won the previous three Champions League titles and beaten Ajax 2–1 in the first leg in Amsterdam. Tadić's performance in the game resulted in him becoming the ninth player ever to receive a 10/10 rating from the French football newspaper L'Équipe. The arrival of Tadić was seen by some pundits as the single biggest reason for Ajax's improvement in the 2018–19 season.

On 23 April 2019, Ajax defeated Vitesse in an Eredivisie match by a score of 4–2. The four goals scored by Ajax secured their position as the first Dutch team in history to score 160 goals across all competitions in a single season. Through 51 matches played at the time, Tadić had directly contributed to 53 of the club's goals in all competitions: 34 goals and 19 assists. He eventually led Ajax to the Champions League Semi-Finals, while earning a spot on the UEFA Champions League Squad of the Season. He also was nominated for the 2019 Ballon d'Or. At the ceremony on 2 December 2019, it was announced that Tadić finished in 20th place.

On 2 May 2021, Ajax were crowned Eredivisie champions. Tadić had the honour of being awarded Dutch Footballer of the Year. On 3 September 2022, he played his 200th match for Ajax in a 4–0 victory against Cambuur.

On 19 February 2023, Tadić scored his 100th goal with Ajax in a 4–0 win over Sparta Rotterdam. On 14 July 2023, his contract was terminated by mutual agreement. He left Ajax with 105 goals and 112 assists in 241 matches.

=== Fenerbahçe ===
On 16 July 2023, Tadić signed a two-year contract with Süper Lig side Fenerbahçe. On 26 July, he made his debut in the Conference League in a 5–0 victory against Zimbru at the Şükrü Saracoğlu Stadium. On 1 August, he scored his first goal for the club in the second leg against the same opponent in a 4–0 victory at the Zimbru Stadium. On 13 August, he made his Süper Lig debut in a 2–1 win against Gaziantep.

On 28 March 2025, Tadić made his 100th appearance in all competitions for Fenerbahçe against Bodrumspor in a 2-4 Süper Lig away win.

=== Al Wahda ===
On 8 August 2025, following weeks of transfer speculation, Tadić signed a one-year contract with UAE Pro League club Al Wahda.

=== NEC Nijmegen ===
On 27 July 2026, it was announced that he had signed a two-year contract with Eredivisie club NEC Nijmegen.

== International career ==
=== Youth and early senior career ===
Tadić was a regular member of Serbia's under-19 and under-21 teams, taking part at both the 2007 UEFA European Under-19 Championship and the 2009 UEFA European Under-21 Championship. He also represented Serbia at the 2008 Summer Olympics, appearing in all three group stage matches.

On 14 December 2008, Tadić debuted for the Serbian senior squad in a 0–1 friendly loss against Poland. On 12 September 2012, he scored his first senior national team goal in his eighth appearance, a 6–1 victory against Wales in the 2014 FIFA World Cup qualification.

==== 2018 and 2022 FIFA World Cups ====
Tadić was one of Serbia's most influential players during the 2018 FIFA World Cup qualification, scoring four goals and helping them win their group. In June 2018 he was selected in the 23-man squad for the final tournament, playing all three group stage matches.

In November 2022, he served as captain of Serbia at the 2022 FIFA World Cup in Qatar. He played in all three group stage matches, against Brazil, Cameroon, and Switzerland. He provided two assists, one in a match against Cameroon, and another one against Switzerland as Serbia finished fourth in the group.

==== 100 appearances and retirement ====
On 10 September 2023, Tadić played his 100th international match in a 3–1 away win against Lithuania during the Euro 2024 qualifying.

On 28 May 2024, he was named in the Serbia squad for UEFA Euro 2024. He appeared as a substitute for Aleksandar Mitrović in the team's opening match of the tournament against England, playing the last 29 minutes of the 1–0 loss. He also played in group stage matches against Slovenia and Denmark. Serbia finished fourth in the group. On 18 July, Tadić announced his retirement from international football.

==== Coming out of retirement ====
In September 2026, Tadić announced he would come out of retirement, and then participated in all the next four matches Serbia played for the 2026–27 UEFA Nations League.

== Career statistics ==
=== Club ===
As of match played 21 November 2026

Appearances and goals by club, season and competition
Club	Season	League			National cup (Note: Includes Serbian Cup, KNVB Cup, FA Cup, Turkish Cup)		League cup (Note: Includes EFL Cup, UAE League Cup)		Continental		Other		Total	
Club	Season	Division	Apps	Goals	Apps	Goals	Apps	Goals	Apps	Goals	Apps	Goals	Apps	Goals
Vojvodina	2006–07	Serbian SuperLiga	23	3	5	1	—		—		—		28	4
Vojvodina	2007–08	Serbian SuperLiga	28	7	1	0	—		3 (Note: Appearances in UEFA Cup)	0	—		32	7
Vojvodina	2008–09	Serbian SuperLiga	29	9	1	0	—		2	0	—		32	9
Vojvodina	2009–10	Serbian SuperLiga	27	10	5	0	—		2 (Note: Appearances in UEFA Europa League)	1	—		34	11
Vojvodina	Total		107	29	12	1	—		7	1	—		126	31
Groningen	2010–11	Eredivisie	34	7	3	0	—		—		4 (Note: Appearances in Eredivisie European play-offs)	0	41	7
Groningen	2011–12	Eredivisie	34	7	1	0	—		—		—		35	7
Groningen	Total		68	14	4	0	—		—		4	0	76	14
Twente	2012–13	Eredivisie	33	12	1	0	—		13	3	4	1	51	16
Twente	2013–14	Eredivisie	33	16	1	0	—		—		—		34	16
Twente	Total		66	28	2	0	—		13	3	4	1	85	32
Southampton	2014–15	Premier League	31	4	3	0	3	1	—		—		37	5
Southampton	2015–16	Premier League	34	7	1	0	2	0	3	1	—		40	8
Southampton	2016–17	Premier League	33	3	2	0	4	0	5	0	—		44	3
Southampton	2017–18	Premier League	36	6	4	1	1	0	—		—		41	7
Southampton	Total		134	20	10	1	10	1	8	1	—		162	23
Ajax	2018–19	Eredivisie	34	28	4	1	—		18 (Note: Appearances in UEFA Champions League)	9	—		56	38
Ajax	2019–20	Eredivisie	25	11	4	2	—		12 (Note: Ten appearances in UEFA Champions League, two appearances in UEFA Europa League)	3	1 (Note: Appearances in Johan Cruyff Shield)	0	42	16
Ajax	2020–21	Eredivisie	34	14	5	3	—		12 (Note: Six appearances and two goals in UEFA Champions League, six appearances and three goals in UEFA Europa League)	5	—		51	22
Ajax	2021–22	Eredivisie	34	13	3	1	—		7	2	1	0	45	16
Ajax	2022–23	Eredivisie	34	11	5	2	—		7 (Note: Five appearances in UEFA Champions League, two appearances in UEFA Europa League)	0	1	0	47	13
Ajax	Total		161	77	21	9	—		56	19	3	0	241	105
Fenerbahçe	2023–24	Süper Lig	38	10	2	0	—		16 (Note: Appearances in UEFA Europa Conference League)	6	0	0	56	16
Fenerbahçe	2024–25	Süper Lig	35	11	2	0	—		16 (Note: Four appearances in UEFA Champions League, twelve appearances and two goal in UEFA Europa League)	2	—		53	13
Fenerbahçe	Total		73	21	4	0	—		32	8	0	0	109	29
Al Wahda	2025–26	UAE Pro League	25	1	2	0	7	2	8 (Note: Appearances in AFC Champions League Elite)	2	1 (Note: Appearance in Qatar–UAE Challenge Shield)	0	43	5
NEC	2026–27	Eredivisie	9	2	0	0	—		7 (Note: Four appearances in UEFA Champions League, three appearances in UEFA Europa League)	0	—		16	2
Career total			643	192	55	11	17	3	131	34	12	1	858	241

=== International ===
As of match played 16 November 2026

Appearances and goals by national team and year
National team	Year	Apps	Goals
Serbia	2008	1	0
Serbia	2009	0	0
Serbia	2010	1	0
Serbia	2011	0	0
Serbia	2012	9	1
Serbia	2013	10	4
Serbia	2014	8	1
Serbia	2015	6	0
Serbia	2016	7	5
Serbia	2017	7	1
Serbia	2018	12	2
Serbia	2019	6	2
Serbia	2020	6	0
Serbia	2021	9	2
Serbia	2022	12	2
Serbia	2023	10	2
Serbia	2024	7	1
Serbia	2025	0	0
Serbia	2026	6	0
Total		117	23

Scores and results list Serbia's goal tally first, score column indicates score after each Tadić goal.

List of international goals scored by Dušan Tadić
No.	Date	Venue	Cap	Opponent	Score	Result	Competition
1	11 September 2012	Karađorđe Stadium, Novi Sad, Serbia	8	Wales	4–1	6–1	2014 FIFA World Cup qualification
2	6 February 2013	GSP Stadium, Nicosia, Cyprus	12	Cyprus	1–1	3–1	Friendly
3	6 February 2013	GSP Stadium, Nicosia, Cyprus	12	Cyprus	2–1	3–1	Friendly
4	11 October 2013	Karađorđe Stadium, Novi Sad, Serbia	19	Japan	1–0	2–0	Friendly
5	15 October 2013	Jagodina City Stadium, Jagodina, Serbia	20	Macedonia	4–0	5–1	2014 FIFA World Cup qualification
6	26 May 2014	Red Bull Arena, Harrison, United States	23	Jamaica	1–0	2–1	Friendly
7	25 May 2016	Užice City Stadium, Užice, Serbia	36	Cyprus	2–0	2–1	Friendly
8	31 May 2016	Karađorđe Stadium, Novi Sad, Serbia	37	Israel	3–1	3–1	Friendly
9	5 September 2016	Rajko Mitić Stadium, Belgrade, Serbia	39	Republic of Ireland	2–1	2–2	2018 FIFA World Cup qualification
10	6 October 2016	Zimbru Stadium, Chișinău, Moldova	40	Moldova	3–0	3–0	Friendly
11	9 October 2016	Rajko Mitić Stadium, Belgrade, Serbia	41	Austria	3–2	3–2	Friendly
12	24 March 2017	Boris Paichadze National Stadium, Tbilisi, Georgia	43	Georgia	1–1	3–1	Friendly
13	23 March 2018	Stadio Olimpico Grande Torino, Turin, Italy	50	Morocco	1–1	1–2	Friendly
14	7 September 2018	LFF Stadium, Vilnius, Lithuania	57	Lithuania	1–0	1–0	2018–19 UEFA Nations League C
15	25 March 2019	Estádio da Luz, Lisbon, Portugal	62	Portugal	1–0	1–1	UEFA Euro 2020 qualification
16	17 November 2019	Rajko Mitić Stadium, Belgrade, Serbia	67	Ukraine	1–0	2–2	UEFA Euro 2020 qualification
17	12 October 2021	Rajko Mitić Stadium, Belgrade, Serbia	80	Azerbaijan	3–1	3–1	2022 FIFA World Cup qualification
18	14 November 2021	Estádio da Luz, Lisbon, Portugal	82	Portugal	1–1	2–1	2022 FIFA World Cup qualification
19	18 November 2022	Bahrain National Stadium, Riffa, Bahrain	91	Bahrain	1–0	5–1	Friendly
20	18 November 2022	Bahrain National Stadium, Riffa, Bahrain	91	Bahrain	2–1	5–1	Friendly
21	24 March 2023	Rajko Mitić Stadium, Belgrade, Serbia	95	Lithuania	1–0	2–0	UEFA Euro 2024 qualification
22	17 October 2023	Rajko Mitić Stadium, Belgrade, Serbia	102	Montenegro	3–1	3–1	UEFA Euro 2024 qualification
23	8 June 2024	Friends Arena, Solna, Sweden	108	Sweden	3–0	3–0	Friendly

== Honours ==
Southampton

- EFL Cup runner-up: 2016–17

Ajax

- Eredivisie: 2018–19, 2020–21, 2021–22
- KNVB Cup: 2018–19, 2020–21
- Johan Cruyff Shield: 2019

Individual

- Serbian SuperLiga Team of the Season: 2009–10
- Groningen C1000 Player of the Year: 2010–11
- Eredivisie Team of the Year: 2013–14, 2018–19, 2020–21, 2022–23
- Eredivisie top scorer: 2018–19 (shared with Luuk de Jong)
- Serbian Footballer of the Year: 2016, 2019, 2021
- UEFA Champions League Squad of the Season: 2018–19
- UEFA Champions League top assist provider: 2018–19
- UEFA Europa League Squad of the Season: 2020–21
- Eredivisie Player of the Season: 2020–21
- Eredivisie Player of the Month: March 2019
- Ajax Player of the Year (Rinus Michels Award): 2020–21
- Dutch Footballer of the Year: 2020–21

== See also ==
- List of men's footballers with 100 or more international caps
