= Li Piyue =

Li Piyue 李丕岳

Chairman of West Bromwich Albion F.C
- Incumbent
- Assumed office 22 May 2018
- Preceded by: John Williams

Personal details
- Born: 1973 (age 52–53) Guangdong, China

Li Piyue (born 1973) is a Chinese businessman and football chairman who formerly served as Chairman of West Bromwich Albion F.C. Li is a long time associate of West Bromwich Albion F.C owner Guochuan Lai.

== West Bromwich Albion ==
The 2017/18 season resulted in West Bromwich Albion's relegation from the Premier League, following a mid-table 10th-place finish the previous season. This sudden decline in results led owner Guochuan Lai to sack Chairman John Williams, CEO Martin Goodman, and later technical director Nick Hammond for their part in the failures of the 2017/18 season. Mainly the decision to appoint Pardew and the decisions made towards transfers in the time leading up to the 2017/18 season.

Li Piyue had been an associate of Guochuan Lai for some time, serving as deputy General Manager at Palm Eco-Town Development Company where Lai was General Manager for 20 years, and had served as a director of West Bromwich Albion following Lai's takeover in 2016. It was suspected that Li was Lai's intended replacement chairman and this belief was confirmed on 22 May 2018, emphasising Guochuan Lai's efforts to establish a greater connection with the club.
