= John Williams (football executive) =

Chairman of Blackburn Rovers F.C.
- In office 1998–2011

Chairman of Professional Game Match Officials Limited
- In office 2013–2016
- Preceded by: Peter Heard

Chairman of West Bromwich Albion F.C.
- In office 15 September 2016 – 13 February 2018
- Preceded by: Jeremy Peace
- Succeeded by: Li Piyue

Personal details
- Born: 1939/1940 Totton, England
- Education: University of London

John Williams (born 1939 or 1940) is an English football chairman. Who was most recently Chairman of West Bromwich Albion F.C.

Williams previously served as chairman and chief executive of Blackburn Rovers F.C., having been appointed to the board in 1997 and then promoted to chairman/chief executive in 1998 by the club's then owner Jack Walker.

With Williams at the helm Rovers enjoyed notable success; winning promotion back to the Premier League in the 2000/01 season. Followed by 10 consecutive seasons in the Premier League (many of which resulted in top 10 finishes), qualification to the UEFA Cup 3 times in 5 years. There was relative success in the cup competitions also, with League Cup victory in 2001/02 and 2 FA Cup semi finals in 2004/05 and 2006/07.

Williams resigned his position as chairman in February 2011, after becoming dissatisfied with the club's new owners Venky's London Ltd., especially after they made the decision to sack manager Sam Allardyce in November 2010. Allardyce had only just concluded a successful season at Rovers, with the club having reached the semi-finals of the League Cup and had ended the 2009/10 season in the top 10 of the division. Shortly after Williams's departure, Blackburn Rovers were relegated to the Championship, in May 2012, where they remain. Following his resignation of his post at Blackburn Rovers, Williams became Chairman of Professional Game Match Officials Limited, and served in this position for 3 years before becoming Chairman of West Bromwich Albion F.C. in 2016.

== West Bromwich Albion ==
Following the announcement of the planned takeover of West Bromwich Albion F.C. by Chinese investors in July 2016, Williams effectively began his term in office, assuming the respective powers of chairman and replacing outgoing Owner and Chairman Jeremy Peace. Upon completion of his takeover on 15 September 2016, incoming owner Guochuan Lai officially appointed Williams chairman of the club. After a string of poor results in the 2017/18 season, Williams was responsible for the sacking of Head Coach Tony Pulis. Williams was later also responsible for the appointment of Alan Pardew as the new head coach of the club.

Following a disastrous run of results under Head Coach Alan Pardew, Williams was sacked by owner Guochuan Lai along with CEO Martin Goodman and later technical director Nick Hammond were all sacked for their part in the decision to appoint Pardew and the decisions towards transfers in the time leading up to the 2017/18 season. Goodman was replaced by returning CEO Mark Jenkins and Williams was replaced as chairman by Li Piyue, an associate of Guochuan Lai.
