= Nacer Chadli =

Belgian footballer (born 1989)

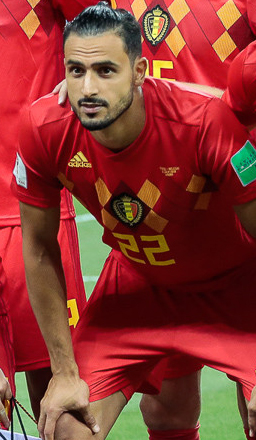
- Chadli with Belgium at the 2018 FIFA World Cup

Personal information
- Full name: Nacer Chadli
- Date of birth: 2 August 1989 (age 37)
- Place of birth: Liège, Belgium
- Height: 1.87 m (6 ft 2 in)
- Positions: Attacking midfielder; winger

Youth career
- 1994–1998: JS Thier-à-Liège
- 1998–2005: Standard Liège
- 2005–2007: MVV Maastricht

Senior career*
| Years | Team | Apps | (Gls) |
| 2007–2010 | AGOVV Apeldoorn | 90 | (28) |
| 2010–2013 | Twente | 78 | (23) |
| 2013–2016 | Tottenham Hotspur | 88 | (15) |
| 2016–2018 | West Bromwich Albion | 36 | (6) |
| 2018–2020 | Monaco | 16 | (0) |
| 2019–2020 | → Anderlecht (loan) | 17 | (8) |
| 2020–2023 | İstanbul Başakşehir | 47 | (5) |
| 2022–2023 | → Westerlo (loan) | 27 | (6) |
| 2023–2024 | Westerlo | 18 | (0) |
| 2025 | Standard de Liège 16 | 10 | (0) |
| Total | | 427 | (91) |

International career
| 2010 | Morocco | 1 | (0) |
| 2011–2021 | Belgium | 66 | (8) |
Medal record
Men's football
Representing Belgium
FIFA World Cup
| Third place | 2018 Russia |
- * Club domestic league appearances and goals

Nacer Chadli (Arabic: ناصر الشاذلي; born 2 August 1989) is a Belgian former professional footballer who played as a winger.

Chadli began his career in the Eerste Divisie with AGOVV Apeldoorn, and in 2010, was transferred to top-flight FC Twente, where he won the KNVB Cup in his first season. In 2013, he joined Tottenham Hotspur, and three years later in 2016 signed for West Bromwich Albion for a club-record £13 million. After two seasons and a handful of appearances for the club, he moved to Monaco. After a loan spell with Anderlecht in 2019, he signed for İstanbul Başakşehir permanently the next year.

Chadli played internationally for Morocco in 2010 as his father is of Moroccan descent, but switched allegiance to Belgium the following year. He has earned over sixty caps for Belgium and represented the nation at the FIFA World Cup in 2014 and 2018, as well as at UEFA Euro 2020 in May 2021.

== Club career ==
=== Apeldoorn ===
Chadli played his youth football at JS Thier-à-Liège, Standard Liège and MVV Maastricht. In the summer of 2007, he was contracted by Dutch second division club AGOVV Apeldoorn, who scouted him at MVV's youth academy. Here he was considered an emerging talent. While Chadli was being tested by AGOVV, he went under the alias "Kaliffe", because technical manager Ted van Leeuwen was afraid other clubs would show their interest. Chadli scored his first goal in professional football for AGOVV in a match against FC Volendam.

=== Twente ===
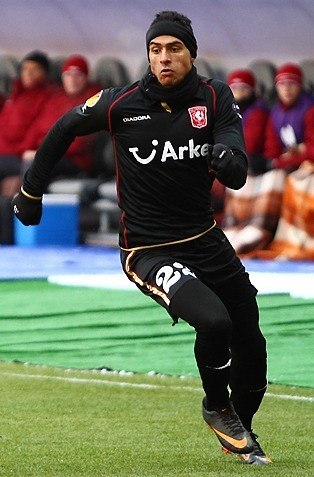
Chadli playing for Twente in 2011

In the summer of 2010, Chadli signed with FC Twente, and in the ensuing season became a first team player for the then reigning Eredivisie champions. His first Eredivisie goal was the winning one away at title rivals PSV. He made his European and Champions League debut in a 2–2 home draw against Internazionale on 14 September in the competition's group stage. On 29 September, he scored his first Champions League goal away at Tottenham Hotspur (4–1), and on 2 November scored his second at Werder Bremen in a 0–2 away victory. He later scored again in the Champions League against Tottenham from a free-kick on 7 December, the goal securing a draw for Twente at home, 3–3.

=== Tottenham Hotspur ===
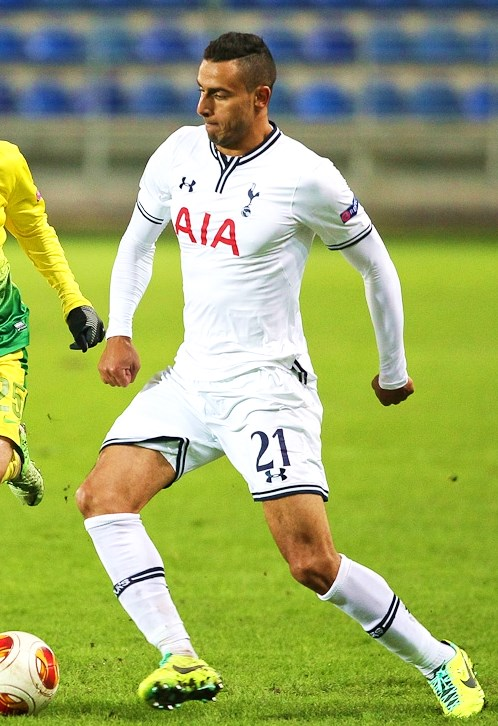
Chadli playing for Tottenham Hotspur in 2013

On 21 July 2013, Tottenham Hotspur agreed a deal with Twente to sign Chadli for a transfer fee of £7 million. The club confirmed that subject to agreement of personal terms and a medical, Chadli would join the Spurs squad for pre-season training in Hong Kong. On 23 July, the club confirmed that Chadli had joined the squad which was participating in training sessions prior to the club taking part in the 2013 Premier League Asia Trophy. Chadli finally agreed terms on 26 July and became an official Tottenham player, later making his Spurs debut in a 5–2 friendly defeat to AS Monaco on 3 August. He made his Premier League debut on 18 August, the first match of the 2013–14 season, against Crystal Palace in a 1–0 win, then scored his first Premier League goal on 12 February 2014, a 0–4 win away to Newcastle United.

On 24 August 2014, the second matchday of the 2014–15 season, Chadli scored twice as Tottenham defeated Queens Park Rangers 4–0 at home. This was the start of a run of good form for Chadli, who went on to score several goals, including one against Tottenham's North London rivals Arsenal. The run of form, however, was cut short by injury, and before he could return to form, his father died. Chadli slowly returned to form, scoring two goals in two matches against Newcastle United and Southampton, respectively, in late April to take his season total to 12, ten in the Premier League. Chadli increased his tally to 11 Premier League goals by rounding the goalkeeper in a 2–0 victory against Hull City on 16 May 2015.

=== West Bromwich Albion ===
On 29 August 2016, West Bromwich Albion agreed a deal with Tottenham Hotspur to sign Chadli for a club-record transfer fee of £13 million. He made his debut in a 1–0 defeat to Bournemouth. Chadli scored twice and got two assists on his home debut, only his second league appearance for the club which ended as a 4–2 win over West Ham United.

In 2017–18, Chadli was troubled by recurring thigh injuries and made only three appearances by the end of April in a West Bromwich Albion side that was eventually relegated. Totalling five appearances, he scored once, a free kick in a 1–1 draw at Leicester City on 16 October 2017.

=== Monaco ===
On 30 August 2018, Monaco announced the signing of Chadli on a three-year deal. They paid more than €12 million to West Bromwich Albion to secure the services of the multipurpose midfielder. At the club he was united with compatriot Youri Tielemans. Chadli competed in the Champions League with Monaco. In Ligue 1, however, he had an unsuccessful season, as Monaco struggled against relegation from the league throughout the competition, only securing it at the end of the season. At Monaco, Chadli played only 1,058 minutes and neither scored a goal or made an assist in all competitions.

==== Loan to Anderlecht ====
On 11 August 2019, Chadli joined Anderlecht on a season-long loan from Monaco after having been sidetracked at the French club. Player-manager Vincent Kompany was able to persuade Chadli in coming to the Belgian First Division A. After Kompany and Simon Mignolet, he was the third Belgian international to return to Belgium to play. Anderlecht took over his entire contract (more than €230,000 gross per month) from Chadli at Monaco. With the experienced Chadli, and a number of other experienced signings, Anderlecht wanted to invest to lift their youngsters to a higher level.

On 17 August 2019, he made his debut for Anderlecht in a 4–2 loss to Kortrijk. The match also marked his debut in the highest Belgian division, which he had left at the age of 17. Despite his injury problems, Chadli was one of the highlights of the club that season. He managed to score eight goals and give five assists in 17 league appearances. However, Anderlecht did not sign him on a permanent deal as the loan expired, as the club did not have the finances.

=== İstanbul Başakşehir ===
On 10 September 2020, Chadli moved to Turkish club Istanbul Basaksehir. He signed a two-year contract with the club, and was assigned jersey number 11. Başakşehir were the defending Süper Lig champions and had thus qualified directly for the group stage of the Champions League. At the point of signing, he still had one year left of his deal with Monaco, but did not have any prospects of playing time there. At the club, he was reunited with a number of fellow former Premier League players, including Martin Škrtel and Demba Ba.

On 8 November, Chadli made his first appearance for Başakşehir, in a league match against Gençlerbirliği, after having been injured during the first two months of his tenure at the club. He came on as a substitute for Deniz Türüç in the 79th minute, as Başakşehir were down 0–1. Chadli went on to contribute heavily to his club's win, giving two assists as the team turned around the game to secure a 2–1.

=== Westerlo ===
On 6 September 2022, Chadli joined Belgian Pro League club Westerlo on a season-long loan. On 18 August 2023, Chadli returned to Westerlo on a permanent basis on a one-year contract.

== International career ==
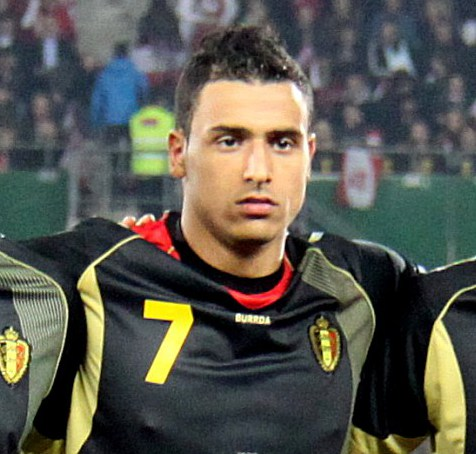
Chadli lining up for Belgium in 2011

A dual citizen of Belgium and Morocco, Chadli was thus able to represent either nation. He made his debut for Morocco on 17 November 2010, in a 1–1 friendly draw against Northern Ireland at Windsor Park, and was named man of the match. On 28 January 2011, however, he announced his intention to represent Belgium internationally, which was permitted because he had not yet played in a competitive match for Morocco. He made his debut for the Belgium national team in a friendly match against Finland on 9 February.

Chadli formerly played as a striker for Belgium, scoring his first international goal in a UEFA Euro 2012 qualifier against Azerbaijan in the King Baudouin Stadium in Brussels on 29 March 2011.

On 26 May 2014, Chadli scored what would have been his third international goal in a pre-2014 FIFA World Cup friendly against Luxembourg. The match, however, was later recognised invalid as coach Marc Wilmots had made seven substitutions instead of the permitted six.

On 13 May 2014, Chadli was named to Belgium's squad for the 2014 World Cup. He started in midfield but was substituted at half time for Dries Mertens in the team's first game of the tournament, a 2–1 win over Algeria in Belo Horizonte.

In May 2018, Chadli was named to Belgium's preliminary 28-man squad for the 2018 FIFA World Cup in Russia, and later made the final 23-man squad on 4 June. On 2 July, Chadli came off the bench to score the winning goal in injury time to give Belgium a 3–2 win over Japan in the round of 16. The goal was chosen by the BBC panel as the goal of the tournament.

== Style of play ==
Chadli played primarily as a midfielder who could additionally operate as an attacking midfielder, in a number 10 role, or as a winger on either flank. He was comfortable on both feet and had a good shot at his disposal.

== Personal life ==
Born and raised in Liège, Belgium, Chadli is of Moroccan descent, and is also a practicing Muslim.

== Career statistics ==
=== Club ===
Appearances and goals by club, season and competition
| Club | Season | League | | | National Cup (Note: Includes KNVB Cup, FA Cup, Coupe de France, Belgian Cup and Turkish Cup) | | League Cup (Note: Includes Football League/EFL Cup and Coupe de la Ligue) | | Europe (Note: Includes UEFA Champions League and UEFA Europa League) | | Other (Note: Includes play-off and super cup games) | | Total | |
| Club | Season | Division | Apps | Goals | Apps | Goals | Apps | Goals | Apps | Goals | Apps | Goals | Apps | Goals |
|---|---|---|---|---|---|---|---|---|---|---|---|---|---|---|
| AGOVV Apeldoorn | 2007–08 | Eerste Divisie | 19 | 2 | 0 | 0 | — | | — | | — | | 19 | 2 |
| AGOVV Apeldoorn | 2008–09 | Eerste Divisie | 34 | 9 | 0 | 0 | — | | — | | — | | 34 | 9 |
| AGOVV Apeldoorn | 2009–10 | Eerste Divisie | 37 | 17 | 1 | 1 | — | | — | | 2 | 0 | 40 | 18 |
| AGOVV Apeldoorn | Total | | 90 | 28 | 1 | 1 | — | | — | | 2 | 0 | 93 | 29 |
| Twente | 2010–11 | Eredivisie | 33 | 7 | 6 | 3 | — | | 11 | 3 | — | | 50 | 13 |
| Twente | 2011–12 | Eredivisie | 23 | 6 | 2 | 1 | — | | 8 | 2 | 2 | 0 | 35 | 9 |
| Twente | 2012–13 | Eredivisie | 22 | 10 | 2 | 0 | — | | 10 | 6 | 4 | 2 | 38 | 18 |
| Twente | Total | | 78 | 23 | 10 | 4 | — | | 29 | 11 | 6 | 2 | 123 | 40 |
| Tottenham Hotspur | 2013–14 | Premier League | 24 | 1 | 1 | 0 | 3 | 1 | 6 | 3 | — | | 34 | 5 |
| Tottenham Hotspur | 2014–15 | Premier League | 35 | 11 | 2 | 1 | 3 | 1 | 5 | 0 | — | | 45 | 13 |
| Tottenham Hotspur | 2015–16 | Premier League | 29 | 3 | 4 | 3 | 1 | 0 | 6 | 1 | — | | 40 | 7 |
| Tottenham Hotspur | Total | | 88 | 15 | 7 | 4 | 7 | 2 | 17 | 4 | — | | 119 | 25 |
| West Bromwich Albion | 2016–17 | Premier League | 31 | 5 | 1 | 0 | 0 | 0 | — | | — | | 32 | 5 |
| West Bromwich Albion | 2017–18 | Premier League | 5 | 1 | 0 | 0 | 1 | 0 | — | | — | | 6 | 1 |
| West Bromwich Albion | Total | | 36 | 6 | 1 | 0 | 1 | 0 | — | | — | | 38 | 6 |
| Monaco | 2018–19 | Ligue 1 | 16 | 0 | 0 | 0 | 1 | 0 | 5 | 0 | 0 | 0 | 22 | 0 |
| Anderlecht (loan) | 2019–20 | Belgian Pro League | 17 | 8 | 2 | 0 | — | | 0 | 0 | — | | 19 | 8 |
| İstanbul Başakşehir | 2020–21 | Süper Lig | 18 | 3 | 1 | 1 | — | | 3 | 0 | 0 | 0 | 22 | 4 |
| İstanbul Başakşehir | 2021–22 | Süper Lig | 28 | 1 | 0 | 0 | — | | — | | — | | 28 | 1 |
| İstanbul Başakşehir | 2022–23 | Süper Lig | 1 | 1 | — | | — | | — | | — | | 1 | 1 |
| İstanbul Başakşehir | Total | | 47 | 5 | 1 | 1 | — | | 3 | 0 | 0 | 0 | 51 | 6 |
| Westerlo (loan) | 2022–23 | Belgian Pro League | 21 | 5 | 2 | 0 | — | | — | | — | | 23 | 5 |
| Career total | | | 393 | 90 | 24 | 10 | 9 | 2 | 54 | 15 | 8 | 2 | 488 | 119 |

=== International ===
Appearances and goals by national team and year
| National team | Year | Apps | Goals |
|---|---|---|---|
| Belgium | 2011 | 6 | 1 |
| Belgium | 2012 | 5 | 1 |
| Belgium | 2013 | 7 | 0 |
| Belgium | 2014 | 10 | 2 |
| Belgium | 2015 | 3 | 0 |
| Belgium | 2016 | 2 | 0 |
| Belgium | 2017 | 9 | 1 |
| Belgium | 2018 | 13 | 1 |
| Belgium | 2019 | 4 | 2 |
| Belgium | 2020 | 2 | 0 |
| Belgium | 2021 | 5 | 0 |
| Total | | 66 | 8 |

Scores and results list Belgium's goal tally first.

List of international goals scored by Nacer Chadli
| No. | Date | Venue | Opponent | Score | Result | Competition |
|---|---|---|---|---|---|---|
| 1 | 29 March 2011 | King Baudouin Stadium, Brussels, Belgium | Azerbaijan | 3–1 | 4–1 | UEFA Euro 2012 qualification |
| 2 | 29 February 2012 | Pankritio Stadium, Heraklion, Greece | Greece | 1–1 | 1–1 | Friendly |
| 3 | 26 May 2014 | Cristal Arena, Genk, Belgium | Luxembourg | 4–1 | 5–1 | Friendly |
| 4 | 10 October 2014 | King Baudouin Stadium, Brussels, Belgium | Andorra | 3–0 | 6–0 | UEFA Euro 2016 qualification |
| 5 | 9 June 2017 | A. Le Coq Arena, Tallinn, Estonia | Estonia | 2–0 | 2–0 | 2018 FIFA World Cup qualification |
| 6 | 2 July 2018 | Rostov Arena, Rostov-on-Don, Russia | Japan | 3–2 | 3–2 | 2018 FIFA World Cup |
| 7 | 6 September 2019 | San Marino Stadium, Serravalle, San Marino | San Marino | 3–0 | 4–0 | UEFA Euro 2020 qualification |
| 8 | 10 October 2019 | King Baudouin Stadium, Brussels, Belgium | San Marino | 2–0 | 9–0 | UEFA Euro 2020 qualification |

== Honours ==
Twente

- KNVB Cup: 2010–11
- Johan Cruyff Shield: 2011

Tottenham Hotspur

- Football League Cup runner-up: 2014–15

Belgium

- FIFA World Cup third place: 2018
