= Joaquim Besora =

Spanish-born Andorran footballer

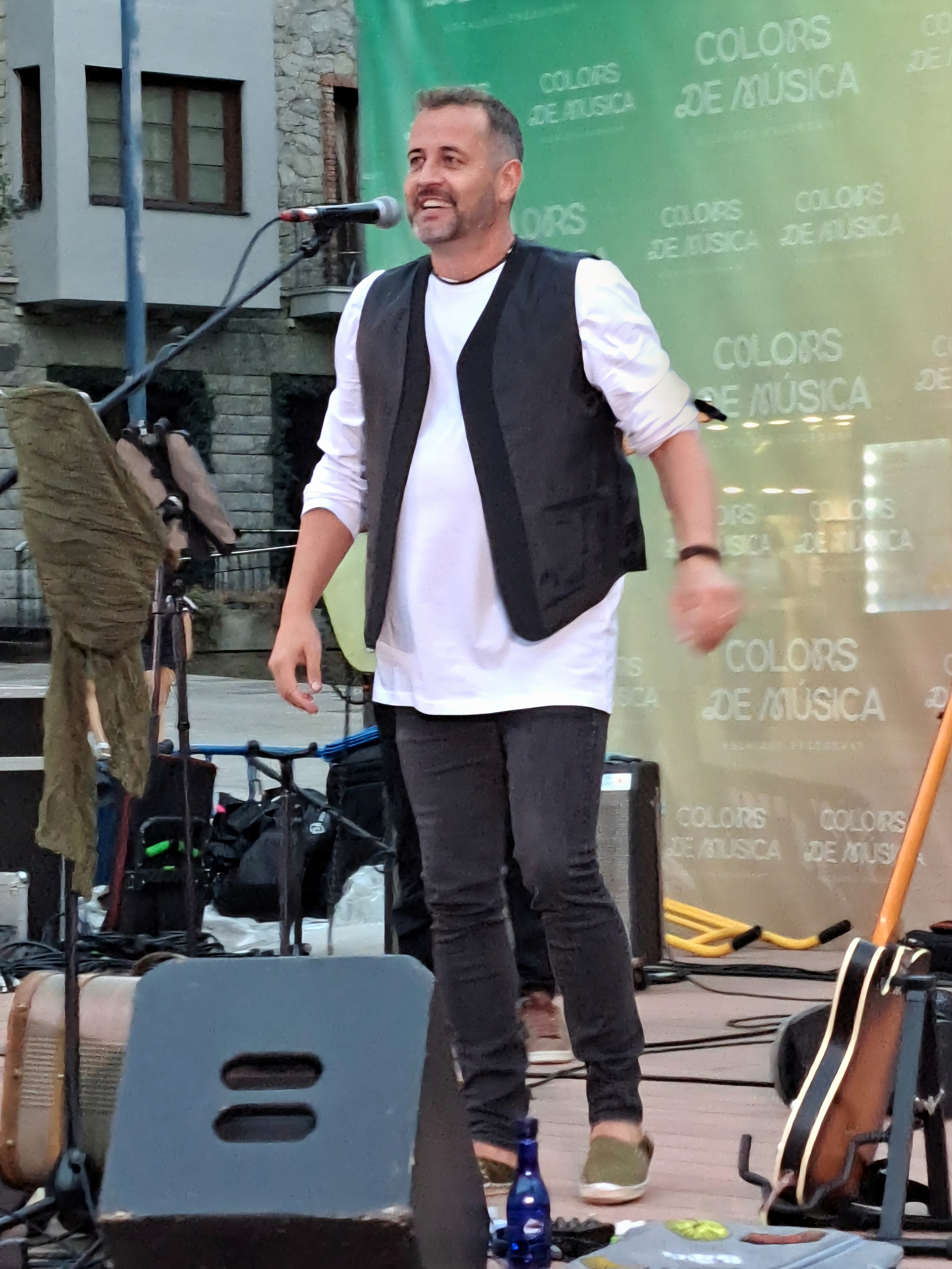
- Quim Salvat in 2026

Personal information
- Full name: Joaquim Salvat Besora
- Date of birth: 18 December 1980 (age 45)
- Place of birth: La Selva del Camp, Spain
- Position: Forward

Senior career*
Years	Team	Apps	(Gls)
2008–2012	Sant Julià		
2012–2014	Santa Coloma	42	(6)
2014–2015	Encamp	7	(1)
2015–2016	Inter Club d'Escaldes		
2018–2019	Encarnada d'Andorra		
2019	La Massana		

International career
2011	Andorra	1	(0)
- * Club domestic league appearances and goals

Joaquim Salvat Besora (born 18 December 1980) is a former Spanish-born Andorran international footballer and former futsal player who played as a forward.

He made his international debut for the Andorra national football team in 2011.

== Music ==
Following his retirement from football, he centered his efforts on his musical career, performing under the stage name Quim Salvat. He achieved widespread musical recognition after winning the 14th Carles Sabater Award for best song in Catalan language, presented by the "Centre de Cultura Catalana" for his solidarity single "Gràcies." His musical style blends traditional singer-songwriter storytelling with contemporary rock elements, featured in studio albums like El meu granet de sorra and L'últim despertar.
