= Mirco Born =

German footballer

Personal information
- Date of birth: 28 June 1994 (age 32)
- Place of birth: Haren, Germany
- Height: 1.75 m (5 ft 9 in)
- Position: Midfielder

Youth career
- VfL Rütenbrock
- –2008: SV Meppen
- 2008–2012: Twente

Senior career*
Years	Team	Apps	(Gls)
2012–2014	Twente	1	(0)
2012–2013	Jong FC Twente	25	(7)
2014	→ Viktoria Köln (loan)	13	(0)
2014–2015	Hertha BSC II	22	(5)
2015–2017	SV Meppen	56	(16)
2017–2019	SV Sandhausen	0	(0)
2018	SV Sandhausen II	11	(5)
2018–2019	→ SV Meppen (loan)	8	(0)
2019–2020	FSV Frankfurt	21	(2)
2020–2022	Astoria Walldorf	14	(0)
2021–2022	Astoria Walldorf II	9	(0)

International career
2009–2010	Germany U16	8	(3)
2010–2011	Germany U17	8	(1)
2012	Germany U18	2	(0)
- * Club domestic league appearances and goals as of 07:50, 4 July 2024 (UTC)

Mirco Born (born 28 June 1994) is a German professional footballer who plays as a midfielder.

== Club career ==
Born was born in Haren.

He made his debut in the Eredivisie for FC Twente on 2 September 2012 when he came on for Luc Castaignos in the 81st minute of the match against VVV Venlo. In January 2014, he returned to Germany to fourth tier Regionalliga West side Viktoria Köln for the remainder of the season.

After not being able to establish himself at Viktoria Köln, he returned to Twente first. In early August 2014 however, his contract was dissolved and he moved to the reserve team of Bundesliga side Hertha BSC. From 2015 to 2017 Born played for fourth tier club SV Meppen. He joined 2. Bundesliga side SV Sandhausen in July 2017.
