= Alexandre Martínez =

Andorran footballer

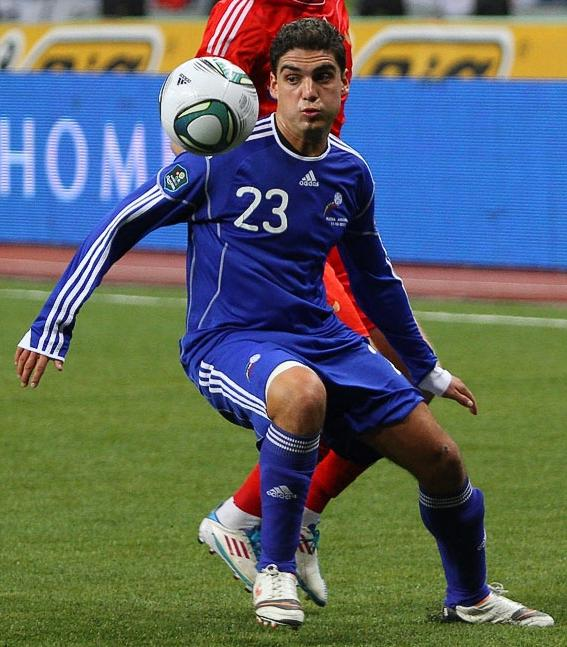
- Martínez in 2011

Personal information
- Full name: Alexandre Rubén Martínez Gutiérrez
- Date of birth: 4 March 1987 (age 39)
- Height: 1.72 m (5 ft 8 in)
- Position: Defender

Senior career*
Years	Team	Apps	(Gls)
2003–2005	Sant Julià		
2005–2007	Andorra	37	(0)
2009–2021	UE Santa Coloma		

International career
2010–2012	Andorra	7	(0)
- * Club domestic league appearances and goals

Alexandre Rubén Martínez Gutiérrez (born 4 March 1987) is an Andorran former footballer who played as a defender. He earned seven caps for the Andorra national team, having made his international debut in 2010.
