= 2023–24 West Bromwich Albion F.C. season =

146th season in existence of West Bromwich Albion FC

West Bromwich Albion
2023–24 season
- Owner: Lai Guochuan (until 28 February); Bilkul Football WBA (from 28 February)
- Chairman: Lai Guochuan (until 28 February); Shilen Patel (from 28 February)
- Manager: Carlos Corberán
- Stadium: The Hawthorns
- Championship: 5th
- FA Cup: Fourth round
- EFL Cup: First round
- Play-offs: Semi-finals
- Top goalscorer: League: Brandon Thomas-Asante (11); All: Brandon Thomas-Asante (12)
- Highest home attendance: 25,386 v Preston North End (4 May 2024, EFL Championship)
- Lowest home attendance: 16,345 v Aldershot Town (7 January 2024, FA Cup)
- Average home league attendance: 23,817
- Biggest win: 4–0 v Preston North End (Away, 30 September 2023, EFL Championship)
- Biggest defeat: 0–3 v Sheffield Wednesday (Away, 27 April 2024, EFL Championship)
Home colours	Away colours	Third colours

The 2023–24 season was the 146th season in the history of West Bromwich Albion and their third consecutive season in the Championship. The club participated in the Championship, the FA Cup, and the EFL Cup.

On 15 February 2024, the club announced that Bilkul Football WBA (led by Shilen Patel and his father Kiran C. Patel) had reached an agreement to acquire an 87.8% shareholding in West Bromwich Group Limited. The takeover was completed on 28 February.

== Squad ==
As of 18 April 2024

No.	Name	Position	Nationality	Place of birth	Date of birth (Age)	Signed from	Date signed	Fee	Contract end
Goalkeepers
24	Alex Palmer	GK	(England)	Kidderminster	10 August 1996 (age 30)	Academy	1 July 2017	—N/a	30 June 2026
33	Josh Griffiths	GK	(England)	Hereford	5 September 2001 (age 25)	Academy	1 July 2020	—N/a	30 June 2025
Defenders
2	Darnell Furlong	RB	(England)	Luton	31 October 1995 (age 31)	Queens Park Rangers	23 July 2019	£1,700,000	30 June 2025
3	Conor Townsend	LB	(England)	Hessle	4 March 1993 (age 33)	Scunthorpe United	28 July 2018	£840,000	30 June 2025
4	Cédric Kipré	CB	(Ivory Coast)	(France) Paris	9 December 1996 (age 29)	Wigan Athletic	4 September 2020	£1,100,000	30 June 2024
5	Kyle Bartley	CB	(England)	Stockport	22 May 1991 (age 35)	Swansea City	16 July 2018	Undisclosed	30 June 2024
6	Semi Ajayi	CB	(Nigeria)	(England) Crayford	9 November 1993 (age 33)	Rotherham United	20 July 2019	£1,650,000	30 June 2025
15	Erik Pieters	CB	(Netherlands)	Tiel	7 August 1988 (age 38)	Free agent	13 September 2022	—N/a	30 June 2024
16	Martin Kelly	RB	(England)	Whiston	27 April 1990 (age 36)	Crystal Palace	1 September 2022	Free Transfer	30 June 2024
26	Pipa	RB	(Spain)	Esparreguera	26 January 1998 (age 28)	Ludogorets Razgrad	1 September 2023	Loan	31 May 2024
Midfielders
8	Jayson Molumby	CM	(Republic of Ireland)	Cappoquin	6 August 1999 (age 27)	Brighton & Hove Albion	1 July 2022	£1,000,000	30 June 2025
14	Nathaniel Chalobah	DM	(England)	(Sierra Leone) Freetown	12 December 1994 (age 31)	Fulham	31 January 2023	Undisclosed	30 June 2024
19	John Swift	CM	(England)	Portsmouth	23 June 1995 (age 31)	Reading	1 July 2022	Free Transfer	30 June 2025
20	Adam Reach	LM	(England)	Chester-le-Street	3 February 1993 (age 33)	Sheffield Wednesday	2 August 2021	Free Transfer	30 June 2024
22	Yann M'Vila	CM	(France)	Amiens	29 June 1990 (age 36)	(Greece) Olympiacos	19 February 2024	Free Transfer	30 June 2024
27	Alex Mowatt	CM	(England)	Doncaster	13 February 1995 (age 31)	Barnsley	2 July 2021	Free Transfer	30 June 2024
31	Tom Fellows	RM	(England)	Birmingham	25 July 2003 (age 23)	Academy	1 July 2021	—N/a	30 June 2027
35	Okay Yokuşlu	DM	(Turkey)	Konak	9 March 1994 (age 32)	(Spain) Celta Vigo	18 July 2022	Free Transfer	30 June 2025
37	Harry Whitwell	CM	(England)	Oxford	16 November 2005 (age 20)	Academy	17 November 2023	Trainee	30 June 2025
47	Fenton Heard	AM	(England)	Birmingham	1 October 2004 (age 22)	Academy	7 July 2023	Trainee	30 June 2024
Forwards
7	Jed Wallace	RW	(England)	Reading	26 March 1994 (age 32)	Millwall	1 July 2022	Free Transfer	30 June 2026
9	Josh Maja	CF	(Nigeria)	(England) Lewisham	27 December 1998 (age 27)	(France) Bordeaux	1 August 2023	Free Transfer	30 June 2026
10	Matt Phillips	RW	(Scotland)	(England) Aylesbury	13 March 1991 (age 35)	Queens Park Rangers	6 July 2016	£6,500,000	30 June 2024
11	Grady Diangana	LW	(Democratic Republic of the Congo)	Lubumbashi	19 April 1998 (age 28)	West Ham United	4 September 2020	£13,500,000	30 June 2025
12	Daryl Dike	CF	(United States)	Edmond	3 June 2000 (age 26)	(United States) Orlando City	1 January 2022	£8,630,000	30 June 2026
17	Andreas Weimann	CF	(Austria)	Vienna	5 August 1991 (age 35)	Bristol City	15 January 2024	Loan	31 May 2024
21	Brandon Thomas-Asante	CF	(Ghana)	(England) Milton Keynes	29 December 1998 (age 27)	Salford City	31 August 2022	£345,000	30 June 2025
23	Mikey Johnston	LW	(Republic of Ireland)	(Scotland) Glasgow	19 April 1999 (age 27)	(Scotland) Celtic	1 February 2024	Loan	31 May 2024
32	Jovan Malcolm	CF	(England)	Birmingham	10 December 2002 (age 23)	Academy	1 July 2021	Trainee	30 June 2024
Out on Loan
18	Karlan Grant	CF	(England)	Thamesmead	18 September 1997 (age 29)	Huddersfield Town	15 October 2020	£16,500,000	30 June 2026
36	Caleb Taylor	CB	(England)	Burnley	14 January 2003 (age 23)	Academy	6 July 2021	Trainee	30 June 2025

== Statistics ==
As of 17 May 2024

No.	Pos	Nat	Player	Total		Championship		FA Cup		EFL Cup	
No.	Pos	Nat	Player	Apps	Goals	Apps	Goals	Apps	Goals	Apps	Goals
2	DF	(England) ENG	Darnell Furlong	49	5	48	5	1	0	0	0
3	DF	(England) ENG	Conor Townsend	46	0	44	0	1	0	1	0
4	DF	(Ivory Coast) CIV	Cedric Kipre	48	3	46	3	2	0	0	0
5	DF	(England) ENG	Kyle Bartley	41	4	38	4	2	0	1	0
6	DF	(Nigeria) NGR	Semi Ajayi	27	2	27	2	0	0	0	0
7	MF	(England) ENG	Jed Wallace	45	6	44	6	1	0	0	0
8	MF	(Republic of Ireland) IRL	Jayson Molumby	25	0	24	0	0	0	1	0
9	FW	(Nigeria) NGR	Josh Maja	12	1	12	1	0	0	0	0
10	MF	(Scotland) SCO	Matt Phillips	26	3	26	3	0	0	0	0
11	FW	(Democratic Republic of the Congo) COD	Grady Diangana	38	7	38	7	0	0	0	0
12	FW	(United States) USA	Daryl Dike	5	1	4	0	1	1	0	0
14	MF	(England) ENG	Nathaniel Chalobah	36	1	33	0	2	1	1	0
15	DF	(Netherlands) NED	Erik Pieters	25	0	22	0	2	0	1	0
16	DF	(England) ENG	Martin Kelly	0	0	0	0	0	0	0	0
17	FW	(Austria) AUT	Andreas Weimann	13	2	13	2	0	0	0	0
19	MF	(England) ENG	John Swift	41	9	39	9	1	0	1	0
20	MF	(England) ENG	Adam Reach	19	0	19	0	0	0	0	0
21	FW	(Ghana) GHA	Brandon Thomas-Asante	41	12	40	11	0	0	1	1
22	MF	(France) FRA	Yann M'Vila	9	0	9	0	0	0	0	0
23	MF	(Republic of Ireland) IRL	Mikey Johnston	20	7	20	7	0	0	0	0
24	GK	(England) ENG	Alex Palmer	48	0	48	0	0	0	0	0
26	DF	(Spain) ESP	Pipa	13	0	13	0	0	0	0	0
27	MF	(England) ENG	Alex Mowatt	47	2	44	2	2	0	1	0
31	MF	(England) ENG	Tom Fellows	38	5	35	4	2	1	1	0
33	GK	(England) ENG	Josh Griffiths	3	0	0	0	2	0	1	0
35	MF	(Turkey) TUR	Okay Yokuslu	48	1	46	1	1	0	1	0
Players out on loan
36	DF	(England) ENG	Caleb Taylor	5	0	2	0	2	0	1	0
Players who left the club during the season
17	MF	(Ecuador) ECU	Jeremy Sarmiento	21	2	20	2	0	0	1	0
25	FW	(Northern Ireland) NIR	Callum Marshall	3	0	3	0	0	0	0	0

== Transfers ==
=== In ===
Date	Pos	Player	Transferred from	Fee	Ref
1 August 2023	CF	(Nigeria) Josh Maja	(France) Bordeaux	Free Transfer	
24 August 2023	CF	(England) Ruben Shakpoke	(England) Aston Villa	Free Transfer	
19 February 2024	CM	(France) Yann M'Vila	(Greece) Olympiacos	Free Transfer	

=== Out ===
Date	Pos	Player	Transferred to	Fee	Ref
23 June 2023	CB	(Republic of Ireland) Dara O'Shea	(England) Burnley	Undisclosed	
30 June 2023	CB	(England) Kean Bryan	Free agent	Released	
30 June 2023	AM	(Portugal) Quévin Castro	(England) York City	Released	
30 June 2023	GK	(England) Beau Hudd	Free agent	Released	
30 June 2023	CF	(England) Tobias Hurlock	Free agent	Released	
30 June 2023	DM	(England) Jake Livermore	(England) Watford	Released	
30 June 2023	CF	(England) Ramello Mitchell	Free agent	Released	
30 June 2023	CB	(England) Cianole Nguepissi	Free agent	Released	
30 June 2023	AM	(England) Samuel Okoka	Free agent	Released	
30 June 2023	RW	(England) Archie Oliver	(England) Colchester United	Released	
30 June 2023	CB	(Norway) Femi Olofinjana	Birmingham City	Released	
30 June 2023	CM	(England) Samuel Oluwatobi	Free agent	Released	
30 June 2023	AM	(England) Rico Richards	(England) Aston Villa	Released	
30 June 2023	AM	(Australia) Tom Rogic	Free agent	Released	
30 June 2023	CM	(England) Jesse Wangusi	Free agent	Released	
8 August 2023	GK	(England) David Button	(England) Reading	Mutual Consent	
15 January 2024	RB	(England) Taylor Gardner-Hickman	(England) Bristol City	Undisclosed	
1 February 2024	SS	(England) Rayhaan Tulloch	Free agent	Mutual Consent	

=== Loaned in ===
Date	Pos	Player	Loaned from	Until	Ref
25 July 2023	AM	(Ecuador) Jeremy Sarmiento	(England) Brighton & Hove Albion	1 January 2024 (Note: On 1 January, Sarmiento was recalled back to Brighton early from his season-long loan.)	
1 September 2023	RB	(Spain) Pipa	(Bulgaria) Ludogorets Razgrad	End of Season	
15 January 2024	CF	(Austria) Andreas Weimann	(England) Bristol City	End of Season	
26 January 2024	CF	(Northern Ireland) Callum Marshall	(England) West Ham United	9 April 2024 (Note: On 9 April, Marshall was recalled back to West Ham early from his loan.)	
1 February 2024	LW	(Republic of Ireland) Mikey Johnston	(Scotland) Celtic	End of Season	

=== Loaned out ===
Date	Pos	Player	Loaned to	Until	Ref
15 July 2023	CF	(England) Karlan Grant	(Wales) Cardiff City	End of Season	
20 July 2023	LB	(Wales) Zac Ashworth	(England) Bolton Wanderers	End of Season	
11 August 2023	CF	(The Gambia) Modou Faal	(England) Doncaster Rovers	13 January 2024 (Note: On 13 January, Faal returned early from his season-long loan at Doncaster.)	
14 August 2023	GK	(England) Bradley Foster	(England) Rushall Olympic	11 September 2023	
22 August 2023	RB	(England) Taylor Gardner-Hickman	(England) Bristol City	15 January 2024 (Note: On 15 January, Gardner-Hickman joined Bristol City permanently.)	
28 August 2023	CM	(England) Jamie Andrews	(England) Grimsby Town	End of season	
1 September 2023	RB	(England) Ethan Ingram	(England) Salford City	End of season	
1 September 2023	CF	(England) Jovan Malcolm	(England) Cheltenham Town	2 January 2024 (Note: On 2 January, Malcolm returned early from his season-long loan at Cheltenham.)	
1 September 2023	CF	(England) Rayhaan Tulloch	(England) Bradford City	1 February 2024 (Note: On 1 February, Tulloch returned early from his season-long loan at Bradford.)	
4 October 2023	GK	(England) Bradley Foster	(England) Alvechurch	28 January 2024 (Note: On 31 October, Foster's loan at Alverchurch was extended by a further two-months.)	
11 November 2023	CF	(England) Layton Love	(England) Brackley Town	2 January 2024	
20 December 2023	RB	(England) Reece Hall	(England) Hereford	16 January 2024	
20 December 2023	CM	(England) Matt Richards	(England) Stourbridge	16 January 2024	
15 January 2024	CF	(The Gambia) Modou Faal	(England) Walsall	End of Season	
26 January 2024	CB	(England) Aaron Harper-Bailey	(England) Kidderminster Harriers	24 February 2024	
1 February 2024	CB	(England) Caleb Taylor	(England) Bolton Wanderers	End of Season	

== Pre-season and friendlies ==
On 26 May, WBA announced their first two pre-season friendlies, against Salford City and Burton Albion. A third and fourth friendly was later added, against Cheltenham Town and Bolton Wanderers. A five-day training camp at the St George's Park National Football Centre and a behind-closed-doors friendly against Shrewsbury Town was later confirmed. The club announced a sixth friendly, against Forest Green Rovers.

Win Draw Loss Fixtures

15 July 2023 Friendly	West Bromwich Albion	3–1	Shrewsbury Town	Walsall
15:00 BST	Townsend 9'; Reach 45'; Molumby 70'	Report	Bowman 31'	Stadium: WBA Training Ground; Attendance: 0 (behind-closed-doors)

18 July 2023 Friendly	Cheltenham Town	1–0	West Bromwich Albion	Cheltenham
19:45 BST	Keena 60'	Report		Stadium: Completely-Suzuki Stadium

19 July 2023 Friendly	Salford City	2–2	West Bromwich Albion	Kersal
19:45 BST	Ashley 70'; Dackers 73'	Report	Gardner-Hickman 55', 58'	Stadium: The Peninsula Stadium

22 July 2023 Friendly	Burton Albion	2–2	West Bromwich Albion	Burton upon Trent
15:00 BST	Stockton 20'; Kamwa 89'	Report	Pieters 15'; Phillips 37'	Stadium: Pirelli Stadium

28 July 2023 Friendly	Forest Green Rovers	2–0	West Bromwich Albion	Nailsworth
19:00 BST	Trialist 40'; Bernard 65'	Report		Stadium: Bolt New Lawn Stadium

29 July 2023 Friendly	Bolton Wanderers	4–3	West Bromwich Albion	Horwich
15:00 BST	Dempsey 45', 59'; Forrester 64'; Morley 90+5'	Report	Wallace 9'; Thomas-Asante 56', 70'	Stadium: University of Bolton Stadium

== Competitions ==
=== Summary ===
August
Albion's opening game was a trip to Ewood Park, against Blackburn Rovers. However, they were caught out by two goals in quick succession by Harry Leonard and Dilan Markanday. Matt Phillips pulled one back in the second half, but ultimately Albion left Lancashire empty handed. Next up was Stoke away in the EFL Cup, with the hosts winning 2–1. Brandon Thomas-Asante was on target for the visitors in that one, equalising either side of Josh Griffiths own goal and Andre Vidigal's quick fire strike. Swansea City were the first to visit the Hawthorns for the season, and Albion managed to record their first win. Semi Ajayi gave the Baggies an early lead following a long throw, before Swans keeper Carl Rushworth put the ball in his own net to double the lead. Conor Townsend then raced into the penalty area to win a spot kick, which was confidently converted by John Swift. Swansea pulled two back through Harry Darling and Ben Cabango, but the hosts held on for a 3–2 win. Albion were on their travels again on the Friday Night, this time to Elland Road. After a goalless first half, Jayson Molumby's shot ricocheted in off Brandon Thomas-Asante's arm, which was not picked up by the officials. Luke Ayling equalised for Leeds in the 72nd minute to split the points in a 1–1 draw. There were six goals in Albion's next match, at home to Middlesbrough finishing 4–2 in Albion's favour. First half strikes from Cedric Kipre and John Swift found the top corner, with Middlesbrough's Emmanuel Latte Lath scoring straight after the second. 2–1 at half-time, it was soon 3–1 when Brandon Thomas-Asante latched onto an error by Lukas Engel. Marcus Forss stuck away a penalty late on and Jeremy Sarmiento scored his first Albion goal to seal the points in stoppage time.

September
Albion were at home again against Huddersfield Town at the start of September, but lost thanks to a 96th-minute winner from Jack Rudoni. They had fallen behind after Delano Burgzorg's first half effort with Swift scoring a counter-attacking goal on 52 minutes. After the season's first international break, Albion were held to a 0–0 draw at Ashton Gate. Bristol City dominated the first half before Albion came into the game in the second period, however neither side could find a goal. There were four goals scored in the opening 25 minutes at Vicarage Road the following Wednesday, and none were scored after that period. Watford began the game brightly and Tom Ince put them in front after just 3 minutes. Albion responded in little time thanks to a Swift free-kick and a clever finish from Albion skipper Jed Wallace. Matheus Martins levelled the Hornets in the 23rd minute and that was the end of the scoring, the game finishing 2–2. Alex Palmer then saved a Zian Flemming penalty in the next game at home to Millwall, but despite a strong display Albion were unable to find a winner and the game ended goalless. Albion certainly weren't shy on goals in their following trip to Deepdale, as they simply blew Preston – who were undefeated – away in a 4–0 thrashing. Darnell Furlong opened the scoring with an arrowed strike in the 4th minute, before Alex Mowatt doubled the lead before half time. Matt Phillips and Kyle Bartley got two late goals to cap off a brilliant away day.

October
Bottom of the table Sheffield Wednesday came to the Hawthorns and lost by a goal to nil, courtesy of John Swift's fifth goal of the season. Swift had six just three days later, when he put Albion 1–0 up just five minutes into a midlands derby at St. Andrew's. However, Albion would go on to lose that game, with Leandro Bacuna equalising from a controversial penalty, and Dion Sanderson and Gary Gardner sealing a 3–1 victory. Albion came out of the international break with a 0–0 draw at home to newly promoted Plymouth Argyle, with the visitors looking the most threatening. It was back-to-back home games as Queens Park Rangers made the trip to Black Country sitting inside the relegation zone. After a goalless opening 45, the game hinged on a penalty won by the dancing feet of Grady Diangana. Brandon Thomas-Asante stuck it away confidently before Diangana grabbed a second thanks to great work by Nathaniel Chalobah. It was a visit to the CBS on Monday Night Football, and Albion made it back to back 2–0 wins. Grady Diangana pounced on Ben Wilson fumbling the ball as he tried to catch it, and Brandon Thomas-Asante scored in the second half with a ruthless finish in the top corner.

November
Albion were back at home against the impressive tigers, Hull City, and made it three wins on the bounce in a 3–1 win. A risky back pass from Jean Michael Seri was intercepted by Jed Wallace, who calmly converted from 12 yards. Hull levelled just before the break, through captain Lewie Coyle with a smart volley. However Albion responded thanks to two fluid team goals finished off by Matt Phillips and Semi Ajayi. However, for the third time in a row, the Baggies would lose going into an international break on the south coast against Southampton. Conor Townsend couldn't keep out Will Smallbone's first half effort, but Albion responded with Kyle Bartley's scramble after Thomas-Asante's header hit the bar in the second half. However, despite a strong second half showing, the Saints struck late via Adam Armstrong. High flying Ipswich Town at home seemed like a tough game to try and respond after the break, but Albion put in an incredible performance to win 2–0. Goals early in each half from Darnell Furlong and Grady Diangana set the Baggies on their way to victory. The final game of November was in South Wales against Erol Bulut's bluebirds. In a scrappy game, the match was decided by a moment of brilliance from Jeremy Sarmiento, curling in a beautiful shot from a tight angle.

December
Albion's next game was a home fixture against top of the table Leicester City, and the Baggies put up a great display and were unlucky to lose. In a cagey affair, Kiernan Dewsbury-Hall headed in a Ndidi cross in the 72nd minute, only for Josh Maja to score what looked to be a goal which salvaged a deserved point. However, there was late heartbreak, as the Baggies were caught on the break and Harry Winks stole the points at the death for Leicester. A rare poor performance followed on Wearside, and Albion were beaten 2–1. After a goalless first half with a couple of refereeing mistakes, Dan Ballard nodded in Sunderland's opener from a free-kick and Dan Neil scored on the counterattack. Thomas-Asante pulled one back, but Albion ultimately lost back to back games for the first time in the season. Albion got back to winning ways at the New York Stadium, winning 2–0 after second half goals from Grady Diangana and Jed Wallace on his return to action following an injury. Rotherham – who had slipped to the foot of the table – tried to make it difficult from the off, but were undone by a deflected Diangana shot and a stunning late free kick from skipper Jed Wallace. The following Sunday Albion returned to the Hawthorns against managerless Stoke City. Lynden Gooch gave the potters an early lead following a cross-shot that sailed over Alex Palmer's head, with Brandon Thomas-Asante equalising with an impressive volley. Albion battled hard in the second half but were unable to find a winner. The Baggies lost 1–0 at the Riverside just two days before Christmas, the start of a run that included 4 games in 10 days. Ex-Albion Academy graduate Morgan Rogers scored what proved to be the winner. They did manage to return to winning ways against Norwich on Boxing Day, as Brandon Thomas-Asante notched his 7th league goal of the season, his 8th in all competitions. Borja Sainz was sent off for the Canaries after 33 minutes, and Albion dominated proceedings before going in front in the 50th minute through Thomas-Asante. Albion ended the year on a high, recording back to back 1–0 home wins with a victory over Leeds United. After soaking up early Whites pressure, Diangana put the Baggies in front following Jed Wallace's cut-back. Albion defended resolutely and held on to secure a memorable victory.

January
Albion began the new year in Swansea and were involved in yet another 1–0 result, this on time on the wrong end of the scoreline. After a goalless first half in which the Baggies were the better side, Swansea took the lead through Liam Cullen. Albion battled hard but the equaliser ultimately eluded them. The Baggies were drawn to non-league Aldershot Town in the FA Cup third round, and prevailed 4–1. Goals from Nathaniel Chalobah, Jovan Malcolm and Daryl Dike put Albion 3–0 up at the interval, and Tom Fellows finished it off in the 88th minute. Aldershot got a late consolation through Ollie Bray. Albion were back in league action the following weekend, at home to Blackburn Rovers. They scored 3 inside half an hour in a 4–1 thrashing, Tom Fellows scoring his first league goal followed by Thomas-Asante scoring and forcing an own goal. Jake Garrett pulled one back for Rovers with a fine finish before Thomas-Asante finished off the contest with his second. Albion's poor record on their travels continued in the trip to Carrow Road, losing and not scoring in their third successive away game. Norwich scored early and late through Josh Sargent and Jonathan Rowe, and won the game 2–0. Albion rounded off January with the highly anticipated FA Cup clash with Black Country rivals Wolves. Pedro Neto scored for the visitors in the opening half, before Matheus Cunha doubled their advantage on the 78th minute. Violence broke out in the crowd straight after, with the match suspended for over 35 minutes. Wolves held on after the restart to secure a 2–0 victory, their first win at the Hawthorns in 28 years.

February
Albion began February with another derby, at home to local rivals Birmingham City, and won by a goal to nil. After a goalless 85 minutes, substitute Andi Weimann came on to score a late winner. Next up was a trip to Portman Road to face fourth place Ipswich Town, and Albion returned with a point. Tom Fellows put the Baggies in front with an impressive solo goal, but Ipswich equalised just after the break through Broadhead. Andi Weimann thought he had restored the visitors lead on 56 minutes after he turned in Darnell Furlong's long throw, but replays showed he had used his hand. John Swift did get Albion back in front with a sensational strike, but in stoppage time Omari Hutchinson equalised for the Tractor Boys. Albion won their fifth straight home game the following Tuesday, beating Cardiff City 2–0 at the Hawthorns. Mikey Johnston scored just 29 seconds into his first start before Andi Weimann sealed the three points late on. Albion's first game under new owner Shilen Patel was against a Southampton side who had just lost their 22-game unbeaten run. The Baggies lost 2–0 in an even encounter, the goals coming from Ryan Fraser and David Brooks. Albion bounced back brilliantly in midweek, winning 3–0 in Devon against Plymouth Argyle. Following a goalless first half, Cedric Kipre opened the scoring from a corner. Substitute Mikey Johnston scored with a curling effort, before Tom Fellows added a third in stoppage time. The Baggies faced another long away day at Hull, but came a way with a battling point. In an end to end contest, Fabio Carvalho opened the scoring with an arrowed strike into the top corner, before Darnell Furlong equalised following a corner. Both sides probed in the second half, but neither could find a winner.

March
Albion began March with a Friday Night encounter with Coventry City. Mikey Johnston opened the scoring on the 6th minute with a wonderful goal, before Grady Diangana made it two half an hour later. Haji Wright pulled one back for the Sky Blues in the second half through a penalty, but the Baggies held on to secure a 2–1 win. The Baggies faced a trip to London in midweek, up against relegation threatened QPR. Sam Field put the Hoops in front, but quick-fire goals from Mikey Johnston and Grady Diangana turned the game on its head. Albion were under the pressure for nearly all of the second half, with Alex Palmer saving a penalty, but QPR eventually equalised through Field again. The Baggies were on the road for the fourth time in five matches the following Sunday, away at Huddersfield Town. Albion produced one of their worst performances of the season in the first half and went 1–0 down thanks to Delano Burgzorg. However, Albion came out of the break rejuvenated and scored four times. Mikey Johnston equalised and then Kyle Bartley put the visitors in front with a goal mouth scramble. Okay Yokuslu scored a thunderbolt soon after, before Johnston scored his second to make it 1–4. Albion made it six unbeaten going in to the March internarional break, picking up a routine 2–0 home win over Bristol City. Goals either side of half time by Tom Fellows and Jed Wallace were enough to secure victory. Albion were back in action in the capital on Good Friday, away at Millwall. Duncan Watmore put the Lions in front after 21 minutes, but John Swift equalised from the spot in the second half to earn a point.

April
Watford – who were under new stewardship under Tom Cleverley – arrived at the Hawthorns three days later. Following a goalless opening 45, Albion found themselves 0–2 down thanks to Edo Kayembe and Mileta Rajovic. However, The Baggies fought back, with Brandon Thomas-Asante pulling one back before Darnell Furlong equalised in stoppage time with a stunner. Albion drew for the third time in a row at the bet365 Stadium, squandering a two-goal lead. Mikey Johnston put the visitors in front, with Jed Wallace doubling the lead early in the second half. But the Potters were not done yet, as Million Manhoef grabbed a goal back and André Vidigal equalised on the rebound after Alex Palmer initially saved his penalty. Next up for Albion was a home game against already relegated Rotherham United. Brandon Thomas-Asante put the Baggies in front before John Swift made it two after converting a controversial penalty. No goals were scored in the second half as Albion extended their unbeaten run to 10 games. The unbeaten run was soon over, as Sunderland came away from the Hawthorns with three points. Albion started strongly before Brandon Thomas-Asante was sent off in the 43rd minute, which changed the complexion of the game. Pierre Ekwah put the visitors in front on the stroke of half-time, and the ten men Baggies succumbed to a first defeat since February. Albion lost again the following Saturday away against promotion-chasing Leicester City. The visitors had plenty of chances but found themselves 2–0 down after goals from Wilfred Ndidi and Jamie Vardy, eitherside of Vardy's missed penalty. Jed Wallace did manage to pull one back but Albion ultimately left the King Power empty handed. The poor form continued at Hillsborough, Albion comfortably beaten 3–0 by Sheffield Wednesday. Anthony Musaba, Ike Ugbo and Josh Windass scored for the hosts.

May
Albion came into the final game of the regular season against Preston North End knowing a win would secure their play-off status. Alex Mowatt put the Baggies in front just before the break from the spot, and Kyle Bartley made it two following a Darnell Furlong long throw on the hour mark. Furlong soon grabbed a third to seal the deal, as Albion confirmed their place in the top six, finishing the season in 5th. The first leg of the play-off semi-final, at home against Southampton, finished goalless. Albion started brightly and Grady Diangana forced a smart stop from Saints keeper Alex McCarthy after half an hour, but Southampton began to control possession and dominate. It was a similar story in the second half, Saints having the majority of the ball but the Baggies still looking dangerous going forward. The biggest chances in the game for both sides came in the 78th minute, McCarthy again denying Grady Diangana after he shot from Tom Fellows' cut-back, before up the other end Alex Palmer produced a brilliant save with his foot to stop Ross Stewart's deflected shot from going in. It ultimately finished 0–0 with Albion needing to win at St Mary's on Friday. However, they were beaten 3–1 as Southampton advanced to Wembley. Following a goalless opening 45 minutes, the Saints took the lead through Will Smallbone. Adam Armstrong added two more to make it 3–0, his second being a penalty, before Cedric Kipre grabbed a late consolation for the visitors in the 7th minute of stoppage time. Heartbreak for Albion in the play-offs again, but overall a promising season and a bright future on the horizon.

=== Overall record ===
Competition	First match	Last match	Starting round	Final position	Record							
Competition	First match	Last match	Starting round	Final position	Pld	W	D	L	GF	GA	GD	Win %
Championship	5 August 2023	4 May 2024	Matchday 1	5th	46	21	12	13	70	47	+23	45.65
Play-offs	12 May 2024	17 May 2024	Semi-finals	Semi-finals	2	0	1	1	1	3	−2	0.00
FA Cup	7 January 2024	28 January 2024	Third round	Fourth round	2	1	0	1	4	3	+1	50.00
EFL Cup	8 August 2023		First round	First round	1	0	0	1	1	2	−1	0.00
Total					51	22	13	16	76	55	+21	43.14

Source: Soccerway

=== Championship ===
==== League table ====
Pos	Team	Pld	W	D	L	GF	GA	GD	Pts	Promotion, qualification or relegation
2	Ipswich Town (P)	46	28	12	6	92	57	+35	96	Promoted to the Premier League
3	Leeds United	46	27	9	10	81	43	+38	90	Qualified for the Championship play-offs
4	Southampton (O, P)	46	26	9	11	87	63	+24	87	Qualified for the Championship play-offs
5	West Bromwich Albion	46	21	12	13	70	47	+23	75	Qualified for the Championship play-offs
6	Norwich City	46	21	10	15	79	64	+15	73	Qualified for the Championship play-offs
7	Hull City	46	19	13	14	68	60	+8	70	
8	Middlesbrough	46	20	9	17	71	62	+9	69	

Source: EFL official website
Rules for classification: 1) Points; 2) Goal difference; 3) Number of goals scored; 4) Head-to-head results; 5) Wins; 6) Away goals; 7) Penalty points (sec 9.5); 8) Number of 12-point sending off offences; 9) Play-off (only if needed to determine promotion/relegation)
(O) Play-off winners; (P) Promoted

==== Results summary ====
Overall								Home						Away					
Pld	W	D	L	GF	GA	GD	Pts	W	D	L	GF	GA	GD	W	D	L	GF	GA	GD
46	21	12	13	70	47	+23	75	15	4	4	38	17	+21	6	8	9	32	30	+2

Source: Soccerway

==== Results by round ====
Round	1	2	3	4	5	6	7	8	9	10	11	12	13	14	15	16	17	18	19	20	21	22	23	24	25	26	27	28	30	31	32	33	29^{1}	34	35	36	37	38	39	40	41	42	43	44	45	46
Ground	A	H	A	H	H	A	A	H	A	H	A	H	H	A	H	A	H	A	H	A	A	H	A	H	H	A	H	A	H	A	H	H	A	A	H	A	A	H	A	H	A	H	H	A	A	H
Result	L	W	D	W	L	D	D	D	W	W	L	D	W	W	W	L	W	W	L	L	W	D	L	W	W	L	W	L	W	D	W	L	W	D	W	D	W	W	D	D	D	W	L	L	L	W
Position	18	14	13	7	11	13	15	13	8	5	11	9	6	5	5	7	5	5	5	5	5	5	5	5	5	5	5	5	5	5	5	5	5	5	5	5	5	5	5	5	5	5	5	5	6	5
Points	0	3	4	7	7	8	9	10	13	16	16	17	20	23	26	26	29	32	32	32	35	36	36	39	42	42	45	45	48	49	52	52	55	56	59	60	63	66	67	68	69	72	72	72	72	75

Source: Soccerway
A = Away; H = Home; W = Win; D = Draw; L = Loss
Notes:
- ^{1} Matchday 29 (vs Plymouth Argyle) was postponed due to both sides continued involvement in the FA Cup.

==== Matches ====
On 22 June, the EFL Championship fixtures were released.

Win Draw Loss Fixtures

5 August 2023 1	Blackburn Rovers	2–1	West Bromwich Albion	Blackburn
15:00 BST	Markanday 20'; Leonard 22'; Travis (yellow card) 29'; Szmodics (yellow card) 30'; Carter (yellow card) 48'; Hedges (yellow card) 87'	Report	Yokuşlu (yellow card) 45+4'; Phillips 50'; Kipré (yellow card) 53'; Wallace (yellow card) 55'	Stadium: Ewood Park; Attendance: 16,741 (2,925 away); Referee: Dean Whitestone

12 August 2023 2	West Bromwich Albion	3–2	Swansea City	West Bromwich
15:00 BST	Ajayi 18'; Furlong (yellow card) 39'; Rushworth 50' (o.g.); Swift 64' (pen.); Chalobah (yellow card) 90+7'; Palmer (yellow card) 90+8'	Report	Cabango (yellow card) 49'; Cooper (yellow card) 57'; Darling (yellow card) 62' (goal) 74'; Wood (yellow card) 71' (goal) 80'	Stadium: Hawthorns; Attendance: 24,051 (1,974 away); Referee: Sam Barrott

18 August 2023 3	Leeds United	1–1	West Bromwich Albion	Leeds
20:00 BST	Gelhardt (yellow card) 15'; Shackleton (yellow card) 55'; James (yellow card) 60'; Ayling 72'; Struijk (yellow card) 78'	Report	Furlong (yellow card) 9'; Molumby (yellow card) 29'; Thomas-Asante 52'; Phillips (yellow card) 56'; Pieters (yellow card) 71'; Yokuslu (yellow card) 85'	Stadium: Elland Road; Attendance: 33,890 (1,995 away); Referee: Matt Donohue
Note: Live on Sky Sports

26 August 2023 4	West Bromwich Albion	4–2	Middlesbrough	West Bromwich
15:00 BST	Kipre 22'; Swift 28'; Thomas-Asante 47'; Ajayi (yellow card) 74'; Sarmiento 90+1'; Sarmiento (yellow card) 90+4'	Report	Latte Lath 29'; Smith (yellow card) 32' (yellow-red card) 51'; Rogers (yellow card) 44'; Forss 85' (pen.)	Stadium: Hawthorns; Attendance: 23,691 (1,965 away); Referee: Jeremy Simpson

2 September 2023 5	West Bromwich Albion	1–2	Huddersfield Town	West Bromwich
15:00 BST	Swift 52' (yellow card) 90+9'	Report	Burgzorg 33'; Ruffels (yellow card) 41'; Rudoni 90+6'	Stadium: Hawthorns; Attendance: 23,094 (855 away); Referee: James Linington

16 September 2023 6	Bristol City	0–0	West Bromwich Albion	Bristol
15:00 BST	Pring (yellow card) 39'; Tanner (yellow card) 54'	Report	Phillips (yellow card) 30'; Molumby (yellow card) 67'	Stadium: Ashton Gate; Attendance: 21,836 (2,550 away); Referee: Anthony Backhouse

20 September 2023 7	Watford	2–2	West Bromwich Albion	Watford
19:45 BST	Ince 3'; Martins 23'; Porteous (yellow card) 53'; Louza (yellow card) 90+5'	Report	Swift 14'; Wallace 17'; Molumby (yellow card) 26'	Stadium: Vicarage Road; Attendance: 16,742 (1,516 away); Referee: Leigh Doughty

23 September 2023 8	West Bromwich Albion	0–0	Millwall	West Bromwich
15:00 BST		Report	Flemming (penalty missed) 29'; McNamara (yellow card) 89'	Stadium: Hawthorns; Attendance: 22,325 (1,110 away); Referee: Tom Nield

30 September 2023 9	Preston North End	0–4	West Bromwich Albion	Preston
15:00 BST	McCann (yellow card) 35'; Potts (yellow card) 81'; Hughes (yellow card) 87'	Report	Furlong 4'; Yokuslu (yellow card) 18'; Mowatt 29'; Phillips 62'; Bartley 87'	Stadium: Deepdale; Attendance: 16,658 (2,011 away); Referee: Josh Smith

3 October 2023 10	West Bromwich Albion	1–0	Sheffield Wednesday	West Bromwich
20:00 BST	Swift 13'	Report	Palmer (yellow card) 66'	Stadium: Hawthorns; Attendance: 22,553 (1,919 away); Referee: John Busby

6 October 2023 11	Birmingham City	3–1	West Bromwich Albion	Bordesley
20:00 BST	Bacuna 23' (pen.); Bielik (yellow card) 25'; Sanderson 38'; Gardner 87'; Longelo (yellow card) 90+4'	Report	Swift 5'; Kipre (yellow card) 86'	Stadium: St. Andrew's; Attendance: 21,495 (1,978 away); Referee: James Linington
Note: Live on Sky Sports

21 October 2023 12	West Bromwich Albion	0–0	Plymouth Argyle	West Bromwich
15:00 BST	Mowatt (yellow card) 35'; Bartley (yellow card) 77'	Report	Azaz (yellow card) 27'; Houghton (yellow card) 42'; Scarr (yellow card) 50'; Miller (yellow card) 55'; Mumba (yellow card) 84'; Cooper (yellow card) 85'; Kesler-Hayden (yellow card) 86'	Stadium: Hawthorns; Attendance: 24,736 (1,985 away); Referee: Stephen Martin

24 October 2023 13	West Bromwich Albion	2–0	Queens Park Rangers	West Bromwich
20:00 BST	Thomas-Asante 59' (pen.) (yellow card) 66'; Diangana 68'	Report	Colback (yellow card) 30'; Chair (yellow card) 40'; Dunne (yellow card) 56' (yellow-red card) 58'	Stadium: Hawthorns; Attendance: 21,745 (676 away); Referee: James Bell

30 October 2023 14	Coventry City	0–2	West Bromwich Albion	Coventry
20:00 GMT	Van Ewijk (yellow card) 55'; Kitching (yellow card) 73'	Report	Diangana 17'; Chalobah (yellow card) 37'; Kipre (yellow card) 45'; Bartley (yellow card) 68'; Thomas-Asante 69'; Yokuslu (yellow card) 73'; Pieters (yellow card) 75'; Phillips (yellow card) 90+2'	Stadium: CBS Arena; Attendance: 23,971 (1,810 away); Referee: Peter Bankes
Note: Live on Sky Sports

4 November 2023 15	West Bromwich Albion	3–1	Hull City	West Bromwich
15:00 GMT	Wallace 14'; Bartley (yellow card) 45+4'; Phillips 65'; Ajayi 71'	Report	Coyle 41'; Seri (yellow card) 45+3'	Stadium: Hawthorns; Attendance: 23,333 (1,780 away); Referee: Andrew Kitchen

11 November 2023 16	Southampton	2–1	West Bromwich Albion	Southampton
15:00 GMT	Smallbone 5'; Downes (yellow card) 36'; Holgate (yellow card) 43'; Armstrong 79'; Alcaraz (yellow card) 86'	Report	Bartley 65'	Stadium: St. Mary's Stadium; Attendance: 30,160 (2,741 away); Referee: Tom Nield

25 November 2023 17	West Bromwich Albion	2–0	Ipswich Town	West Bromwich
17:30 GMT	Furlong 5'; Diangana (yellow card) 39' (goal) 47'	Report	Williams (yellow card) 60'; Morsy (yellow card) 75'	Stadium: Hawthorns; Attendance: 24,001 (1,989 away); Referee: Gavin Ward
Note: Live on Sky Sports

28 November 2023 18	Cardiff City	0–1	West Bromwich Albion	Leckwith
19:45 GMT	Bowler (yellow card) 87'	Report	Sarmiento 50'; Furlong (yellow card) 88'; Bartley (yellow card) 90'	Stadium: Cardiff City Stadium; Attendance: 18,248 (1,107 away); Referee: Josh Smith

2 December 2023 19	West Bromwich Albion	1–2	Leicester City	West Bromwich
12:30 GMT	Mowatt (yellow card) 63'; Yokuslu (yellow card) 74'; Maja 89'	Report	Pereira (yellow card) 66'; Dewsbury-Hall 72'; Winks 90+4'	Stadium: Hawthorns; Attendance: 24,382 (2,000 away); Referee: Tim Robinson
Note: Live on Sky Sports

9 December 2023 20	Sunderland	2–1	West Bromwich Albion	Sunderland
12:30 GMT	Ballard (yellow card) 34' (goal) 70'; Neil 84'	Report	Sarmiento (yellow card) 51'; Molumby (yellow card) 54'; Chalobah (yellow card) 81'; Thomas-Asante 86' (yellow card) 90'; Furlong (yellow card) 90+3'; Pipa (yellow card) 90+6'	Stadium: Stadium of Light; Attendance: 40,101 (937 away); Referee: Darren Bond
Note: Live on Sky Sports

12 December 2023 21	Rotherham United	0–2	West Bromwich Albion	Rotherham
19:45 GMT		Report	Furlong (yellow card) 8'; Diangana 54'; Wallace 90'	Stadium: New York Stadium; Attendance: 9,567 (1,237 away); Referee: Sam Barrott

17 December 2023 22	West Bromwich Albion	1–1	Stoke City	West Bromwich
12:00 GMT	Thomas-Asante 35'; Yokuslu (yellow card) 44'; Bartley (yellow card) 45+3'; Fellows (yellow card) 83'	Report	Gooch 12'; Burger (yellow card) 61'	Stadium: Hawthorns; Attendance: 23,298 (1,956 away); Referee: Andrew Kitchen
Note: Live on Sky Sports

23 December 2023 23	Middlesbrough	1–0	West Bromwich Albion	Middlesbrough
15:00 GMT	Rogers 40'; Howson (yellow card) 52'	Report	Kipre (yellow card) 15'; Furlong (yellow card) 65'	Stadium: Riverside Stadium; Attendance: 29,145 (1,367 away); Referee: James Linington

26 December 2023 24	West Bromwich Albion	1–0	Norwich City	West Bromwich
15:00 GMT	Thomas-Asante 50'	Report	Sainz (yellow card) 30' (yellow-red card) 33'	Stadium: Hawthorns; Attendance: 25,086 (992 away); Referee: James Bell

29 December 2023 25	West Bromwich Albion	1–0	Leeds United	West Bromwich
20:15 GMT	Diangana 37'; Kipre (yellow card) 90+4'	Report	Gruev (yellow card) 46'	Stadium: Hawthorns; Attendance: 25,409 (1,972 away); Referee: Graham Scott
Note: Live on Sky Sports

1 January 2024 26	Swansea City	1–0	West Bromwich Albion	Landore
15:00 GMT	Cabango (yellow card) 18'; Tymon (yellow card) 49'; Cullen 55'	Report		Stadium: Swansea.com Stadium; Attendance: 16,767 (1,134 away); Referee: Andy Davies

13 January 2024 27	West Bromwich Albion	4–1	Blackburn Rovers	West Bromwich
15:00 GMT	Fellows 11'; Thomas-Asante 30', 63'; Hyam 33' (o.g.); Bartley (yellow card) 40'; Kipre (yellow card) 43'	Report	Garrett 60'	Stadium: Hawthorns; Attendance: 24,409 (1,258 away); Referee: Stephen Martin

20 January 2024 28	Norwich City	2–0	West Bromwich Albion	Norwich
15:00 GMT	Sargent 13'; Rowe 71'; Stacey (yellow card) 90'	Report	Bartley (yellow card) 17'; Wallace (yellow card) 79'	Stadium: Carrow Road; Attendance: 25,180 (1,793 away); Referee: Sunny Sukhvir Gill

3 February 2024 30	West Bromwich Albion	1–0	Birmingham City	West Bromwich
15:00 GMT	Kipre (yellow card) 34'; Furlong (yellow card) 78'; Weimann 85'	Report	Buchanan (yellow card) 33'; Bielik (yellow card) 55'; Dozzell (yellow card) 65'	Stadium: Hawthorns; Attendance: 24,907 (2,000 away); Referee: David Webb

10 February 2024 31	Ipswich Town	2–2	West Bromwich Albion	Ipswich
12:30 GMT	Morsy (yellow card) 30'; Broadhead 46'; Clarke (yellow card) 49'; Hutchinson 90+3'	Report	Fellows 18'; Furlong (yellow card) 47'; Weimann (yellow card) 56'; Chalobah (yellow card) 66'; Swift 76'	Stadium: Portman Road; Attendance: 29,106 (1,670 away); Referee: David Coote
Note: Live on Sky Sports

13 February 2024 32	West Bromwich Albion	2–0	Cardiff City	West Bromwich
20:00 GMT	Johnston 1'; Furlong (yellow card) 52'; Weimann 80'	Report	Collins (yellow card) 49'; Goutas (yellow card) 72'	Stadium: Hawthorns; Attendance: 23,541 (1,629 away); Referee: Rebecca Welch

16 February 2024 33	West Bromwich Albion	0–2	Southampton	West Bromwich
20:00 GMT	Thomas-Asante (yellow card) 44'; Yokuslu (yellow card) 50'	Report	Fraser 14'; Smallbone (yellow card) 55'; Brooks 73'	Stadium: Hawthorns; Attendance: 25,066 (1,970 away); Referee: Sam Allison
Note: Live on Sky Sports

20 February 2024 29	Plymouth Argyle	0–3	West Bromwich Albion	Plymouth
19:45 GMT	Mumba (yellow card) 57'	Report	Kipre 61'; Johnston 76'; Fellows 90+1'	Stadium: Home Park; Attendance: 16,310 (1,201 away); Referee: Tom Nield
Note: Fixture was originally scheduled for 27 January, but was postponed due to both sides continued involvement in the FA Cup.

24 February 2024 34	Hull City	1–1	West Bromwich Albion	Kingston upon Hull
12:30 GMT	Carvalho 35'	Report	Furlong 43'	Stadium: MKM Stadium; Attendance: 22,654 (1,959 away); Referee: Stephen Martin
Note: Live on Sky Sports

1 March 2024 35	West Bromwich Albion	2–1	Coventry City	West Bromwich
20:00 GMT	Johnston 6'; Townsend (yellow card) 21'; Diangana 36'; Reach (yellow card) 90+3'	Report	Palmer (yellow card) 49'; Wright 73' (pen.)	Stadium: Hawthorns; Attendance: 24,839 (1,980 away); Referee: Lewis Smith
Note: Live on Sky Sports

6 March 2024 36	Queens Park Rangers	2–2	West Bromwich Albion	Shepherd's Bush
20:00 GMT	Field 17', 81'; Frey (penalty missed) 51'	Report	Johnston 25'; Diangana 27'; Palmer (yellow card) 55'	Stadium: Loftus Road; Attendance: 16,818 (1,540 away); Referee: Geoff Eltringham
Note: Live on Sky Sports

10 March 2024 37	Huddersfield Town	1–4	West Bromwich Albion	Huddersfield
12:00 GMT	Burgzorg 30' (yellow card) 31'	Report	Johnston 51', 73'; Bartley 60'; Yokuslu 66'; Mowatt (yellow card) 87'	Stadium: John Smith's Stadium; Attendance: 19,383 (1,104 away); Referee: David Webb
Note: Live on Sky Sports

16 March 2024 38	West Bromwich Albion	2–0	Bristol City	West Bromwich
15:00 GMT	Townsend (yellow card) 38'; Fellows 45'; Wallace 50'; Yokuslu (yellow card) 71'; Kipre (yellow card) 85'; Palmer (yellow card) 90+1'	Report	Knight (yellow card) 45'; Gardner-Hickman (yellow card) 59'	Stadium: Hawthorns; Attendance: 25,254 (1,991 away); Referee: Tom Nield

29 March 2024 39	Millwall	1–1	West Bromwich Albion	Bermondsey
13:00 GMT	Bryan (yellow card) 5'; Watmore 21'	Report	Bartley (yellow card) 17'; Kipre (yellow card) 60'; Swift 67' (pen.)	Stadium: The Den; Attendance: 17,856 (2,000 away); Referee: James Bell

1 April 2024 40	West Bromwich Albion	2–2	Watford	West Bromwich
15:00 BST	Thomas-Asante 70'; Furlong 90+1'	Report	Dennis (yellow card) 30'; Kayembe 51'; Rajovic 66'	Stadium: Hawthorns; Attendance: 24,173 (1,369 away); Referee: Gavin Ward

6 April 2024 41	Stoke City	2–2	West Bromwich Albion	Stoke-on-Trent
15:00 BST	Manhoef 68'; Vidigal (penalty missed) 78' 78'; Thompson (yellow card) 89'; Burger (yellow card) 90'	Report	Johnston 24'; Diangana (yellow card) 28'; Wallace 57'; M'Vila (yellow card) 78'	Stadium: bet365 Stadium; Attendance: 22,339 (2,600 away); Referee: Andrew Kitchen

10 April 2024 42	West Bromwich Albion	2–0	Rotherham United	West Bromwich
20:00 BST	Thomas-Asante 23'; Swift 45+1' (pen.)	Report	Rinomhota (yellow card) 87'	Stadium: Hawthorns; Attendance: 22,331 (179 away); Referee: Geoff Eltringham

13 April 2024 43	West Bromwich Albion	0–1	Sunderland	West Bromwich
15:00 BST	Thomas-Asante (yellow card) 42' (yellow-red card) 43'; Furlong (yellow card) 63'; Wallace (yellow card) 68'; Kipre (yellow card) 86'	Report	Hume (yellow card) 31'; Ekwah 45+2'; Alese (yellow card) 80'; Styles (yellow card) 85'	Stadium: Hawthorns; Attendance: 25,366 (1,971 away); Referee: Matt Donohue

20 April 2024 44	Leicester City	2–1	West Bromwich Albion	Leicester
12:30 BST	Ndidi 22' (yellow card) 90+4'; Vardy (penalty missed) 45' 65'; Choudhury (yellow card) 85'; Daka (yellow card) 88'	Report	M'Vila (yellow card) 24'; Wallace 76'; Kipre (yellow card) 90+8'	Stadium: King Power Stadium; Attendance: 31,874 (3,305 away); Referee: Thomas Bramall
Note: Live on Sky Sports

27 April 2024 45	Sheffield Wednesday	3–0	West Bromwich Albion	Sheffield
15:00 BST	Musaba 22' (yellow card) 23'; Ugbo 50'; Windass 69' (yellow card) 69'; Famewo (yellow card) 90+7'	Report	Bartley (yellow card) 90+7'	Stadium: Hillsborough; Attendance: 33,295 (2,400 away); Referee: Graham Scott

4 May 2024 46	West Bromwich Albion	3–0	Preston North End	West Bromwich
12:30 BST	Mowatt 45+2' (pen.); Bartley 61'; Furlong 68'	Report	Lindsay (yellow card) 16'; Woodman (yellow card) 45+2'	Stadium: Hawthorns; Attendance: 25,386 (1,266 away); Referee: Steve Martin

=== Play-offs ===
As a result of finishing 5th in the Championship, West Brom participated in the play-offs against 4th placed Southampton.

12 May 2024 Semi-final	West Bromwich Albion	0–0	Southampton	West Bromwich
14:15	Johnston (yellow card) 56'	Report	Downes (yellow card) 36'; Harwood-Bellis (yellow card) 73'	Stadium: Hawthorns; Attendance: 25,367 (1,996 away); Referee: Sam Barrott
Note: Live on Sky Sports

17 May 2024 Semi-final	Southampton	3–1 (3–1 agg.)	West Bromwich Albion	Southampton
20:00	Smallbone 49'; Armstrong 78', 86' (pen.)	Report	Mowatt (yellow card) 76'; Swift (yellow card) 82'; Kipré (yellow card) 89', (goal) 90+7'; M'Vila (yellow card) 90+4'	Stadium: St. Mary's Stadium; Attendance: 30,712 (2,000 away); Referee: Tim Robinson
Note: Live on Sky Sports

=== FA Cup ===
As a Championship side, West Brom joined in the third round and were drawn at home to Aldershot Town. In the fourth round they were drawn at home to Wolverhampton Wanderers.

Win Draw Loss Fixtures

7 January 2024 Third round	West Bromwich Albion	4–1	Aldershot Town	West Bromwich
14:00 GMT	Chalobah 7' (yellow card) 39'; Malcolm 15'; Dike 27'; Fellows 88'	Report	Harries (yellow card) 33'; Widdrington (yellow card) 35'; Bray 90+5'	Stadium: Hawthorns; Attendance: 16,345 (4,861 away); Referee: Anthony Backhouse

28 January 2024 Fourth round	West Bromwich Albion	0–2	Wolverhampton Wanderers	West Bromwich
11:45 GMT	Wallace (yellow card) 54'; Bartley (yellow card) 72'	Report	Neto 38'; Cunha 78'	Stadium: The Hawthorns; Attendance: 25,013 (4,011 away); Referee: Thomas Bramall
Note: Match was temporarily suspended at 78 minutes due to "fan disorder", with play resuming at 14:00 GMT.

=== EFL Cup ===
West Brom were drawn away to Stoke City in the first round.

Win Draw Loss Fixtures

8 August 2023 First round	Stoke City	2–1	West Bromwich Albion	Stoke-on-Trent
19:45 BST	McNally (yellow card) 5'; Griffiths 27' (o.g.); Sidibe (yellow card) 45'; Vidigal 65'; Travers (yellow card) 76'	Report	Pieters (yellow card) 31'; Thomas-Asante 64'; Bartley (yellow card) 66'; Gardner-Hickman (yellow card) 68'; Griffiths (yellow card) 86'	Stadium: Bet365 Stadium; Attendance: 10,583 (1,357 away); Referee: Geoff Eltringham

== End of season awards ==
The winners of the 2023/24 end of season West Bromwich Albion awards were announced on 4 May 2024.

- Supporters' Player of the Season (Ivory Coast) Cedric Kipre
- Players’ Player of the Season (Ivory Coast) Cedric Kipre
- Top Goalscorer (Ghana) Brandon Thomas-Asante 12 goals
- Goal of the Season (Turkey) Okay Yokuslu v Huddersfield Town (Away)
- Young Player of the Season (England) Tom Fellows
