= John Swift (footballer, born 1995) =

English footballer

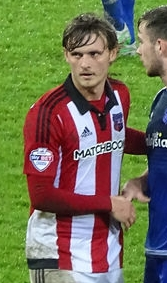
- Swift playing for Brentford in 2015

Personal information
- Full name: John David Swift
- Date of birth: 23 June 1995 (age 31)
- Place of birth: Portsmouth, England
- Height: 6 ft 0 in (1.82 m)
- Positions: Attacking midfielder; left winger

Team information
- Current team: Portsmouth
- Number: 8

Youth career
- 2000–2004: Kickers Sports
- 2005–2006: Portsmouth
- 2006: Chelsea
- 2006: Pace Youth F.C.
- 2007–2014: Chelsea

Senior career*
Years	Team	Apps	(Gls)
2014–2016	Chelsea	1	(0)
2014	→ Rotherham United (loan)	4	(0)
2015	→ Swindon Town (loan)	18	(2)
2015–2016	→ Brentford (loan)	27	(7)
2016–2022	Reading	187	(31)
2022–2025	West Bromwich Albion	118	(18)
2025–	Portsmouth	19	(2)

International career
2010	England U16	1	(0)
2011–2012	England U17	10	(0)
2012	England U18	1	(0)
2012–2014	England U19	11	(0)
2014–2015	England U20	7	(1)
2015–2017	England U21	13	(1)
- * Club domestic league appearances and goals as of 19:40, 31 January 2026 (UTC)

John David Swift (born 23 June 1995) is an English professional footballer who plays an attacking midfielder or left winger for EFL Championship club Portsmouth.

== Early life ==
John David Swift was born on 23 June 1995 in Portsmouth, Hampshire. And attended Brune Park Secondary School.

== Club career ==
=== Chelsea ===
A midfielder, Swift began his career at Soccer City in Fareham, before moving to Kickers Sports in Eastleigh. He joined local Premier League club Portsmouth in 2005, but was released after just one season. He joined Chandler's Ford Tornadoes, before spending six months with Premier League club Chelsea as an U13. Upon his release he joined Pace Youth in Southampton After interest from Fulham, Portsmouth and Southampton, Swift rejoined Chelsea after a successful trial in 2007.

While still an U15, Swift made his U18 debut during the 2009–10 season. He was a part of the U15 team's success in the Junior Section of the 2010 Milk Cup, scoring in a 3–0 victory over Cruz Azul in the final. Swift signed a scholarship deal at the end of the 2010–11 season and was part of the U18 team which won the 2011–12 FA Youth Cup. He made his U21 debut towards the end of the 2011–12 season and was awarded a four-year professional contract in July 2012. Swift alternated between the U18, U19 and U21 teams during the 2012–13 season and he cemented a place in the U21s the following year, scoring 9 goals in 26 appearances and winning the U21 Premier League title.

Swift began training with the first team in the latter stages of the 2013–14 season and was rewarded for his form with the U21s by being named as a substitute for the final match of the campaign versus Cardiff City. He made his professional debut when he replaced Eden Hazard in the dying minutes of the 2–1 victory. Swift spent the majority of the 2014–15 season away on loan and did not receive a first team call up.

On 1 August 2014, Swift joined newly promoted Championship side Rotherham United on loan for the duration of the 2014–15 season. He made his debut as a substitute on the opening day of the season in a 1–0 away defeat to Derby County, replacing Matt Derbyshire after 70 minutes. He made his first start for the Millers in the following match versus Fleetwood Town in the League Cup first round, lasting 66 minutes of the extra time victory before being replaced by Matt Derbyshire. After two further appearances, Swift was consigned to the bench until 14 November, when he returned to Chelsea after failing to "make a significant impact" at the New York Stadium. He made just four appearances for the club.

On 3 January 2015, Swift joined high-flying League One club Swindon Town on loan until the end of the 2014–15 season. He began his time at the County Ground by making five consecutive starts and he scored his first professional goal on his third appearance, in a 3–1 victory over Chesterfield. He netted again on 7 March, sending the Robins on their way to a 3–0 victory over Notts County. A fourth-place finish saw Swindon qualify for the promotion playoffs, but Swift made just one appearance in the semi-final first leg versus Sheffield United, picking up a muscle strain, which saw him ruled out of the victorious second leg and the final defeat to Preston North End. He made 19 appearances and scored two goals for Swindon.

On 1 October 2015, Swift joined Championship side Brentford on a loan which was later extended until the end of the 2015–16 season. He made his debut two days later as a second-half substitute for Toumani Diagouraga during a 2–0 defeat to Derby County. Deployed as a right winger, Swift replaced Konstantin Kerschbaumer in the starting lineup for the following match versus former side Rotherham United and scored his first goal for the Bees with the opener in a 3–0 win over Charlton Athletic on 24 October. He became a regular starter and scored the first brace of his career to send the Bees on the way to a 3–0 win over Wolverhampton Wanderers on 23 February 2016, subsequently being named in the Football League Team of Midweek. After overcoming an achilles injury suffered on international duty, he scored his seventh goal of the season in a 5–1 rout of Huddersfield Town on the final day. Swift made 28 appearances during the season and returned to Stamford Bridge.

=== Reading ===
Swift signed a three-year contract, with the option of an additional year, with Reading on 14 July 2016. He scored on his Reading debut in a 1–0 win over Preston North End on 6 August 2016.

On 27 March 2017, Swift was nominated for the EFL Young Player of the Year award along with Ryan Ledson and Ollie Watkins.

On 31 July 2017, Swift signed a new five-year contract with Reading, keeping him at the club until 2022. On 11 September 2021, he scored a hat-trick, in a 3–3 draw against Queens Park Rangers.

=== West Bromwich Albion ===
Swift signed a three-year contract with West Bromwich Albion on 26 May 2022 on a free transfer. On 30 July 2022, he made his competitive debut and scored the equalizing goal in a 1-1 draw against Middlesbrough in the opening game of the championship season.

=== Portsmouth ===
On 15 July 2025, Swift signed for Championship club Portsmouth on a free transfer after the expiry of his West Bromwich Albion contract.

== International career ==
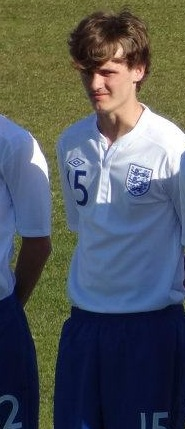
Swift lining up for England U17 in 2012

Swift has represented England from U16 through to U21 level. He made his international debut in a Victory Shield defeat to Wales U16 on 15 October 2010. He was part of the U17 squad which won the 2011 FA International Tournament and the 2012 Algarve Tournament, but he could not help the team to qualify for the 2012 European U17 Championship. Swift made 9 appearances during the U19s' failed qualification attempts for the 2013 and 2014 European U19 Championships. Moving up to U20 level for the 2014–15 season, Swift was a part of the squad which won the 2014 Four Nation Tournament and he finally scored his first international goal with the opener in a 2–1 victory over United States U20 on 29 March 2015. Swift was called into the U20 squad for the 2015 Toulon Tournament and appeared in all of England's matches as the Young Lions finished fourth. In November 2015, Swift made his U21 debut with a start in a 3–1 2017 European U21 Championship qualifying win over Switzerland. On 25 August 2016, he was called up for Gareth Southgate's U21 side to face Norway in a UEFA U21 Euro 2017 qualifier.

== Personal life ==
Swift attended Brune Park school in Gosport and lived in the town until the age of 16.

== Career statistics ==
As of matches played 31 January 2026

Appearances and goals by club, season and competition
Club	Season	League			FA Cup		League Cup		Other		Total	
Club	Season	Division	Apps	Goals	Apps	Goals	Apps	Goals	Apps	Goals	Apps	Goals
Chelsea	2013–14	Premier League	1	0	0	0	0	0	0	0	1	0
Chelsea	2014–15	Premier League	0	0	0	0	0	0	0	0	0	0
Chelsea	2015–16	Premier League	0	0	0	0	0	0	0	0	0	0
Chelsea	Total		1	0	0	0	0	0	0	0	1	0
Rotherham United (loan)	2014–15	Championship	3	0	—		1	0	—		4	0
Swindon Town (loan)	2014–15	League One	18	2	—		—		1 (Note: Appearance in League One play-offs)	0	19	2
Brentford (loan)	2015–16	Championship	27	7	1	0	—		—		28	7
Reading	2016–17	Championship	36	8	1	0	2	1	3 (Note: Appearances in the Championship play-offs)	0	42	9
Reading	2017–18	Championship	24	2	1	0	1	0	—		26	2
Reading	2018–19	Championship	34	3	1	0	2	1	—		37	4
Reading	2019–20	Championship	41	6	2	0	2	0	—		45	6
Reading	2020–21	Championship	14	1	0	0	0	0	—		14	1
Reading	2021–22	Championship	38	11	0	0	0	0	—		38	11
Reading	Total		187	31	5	0	7	2	3	0	202	33
West Bromwich Albion	2022–23	Championship	45	6	1	1	2	0	—		48	7
West Bromwich Albion	2023–24	Championship	37	9	1	0	1	0	2	0	41	9
West Bromwich Albion	2024–25	Championship	36	3	1	0	0	0	—		37	3
West Bromwich Albion	Total		118	18	3	1	3	0	2	0	126	19
Portsmouth	2025–26	Championship	18	1	1	0	1	0	—		20	1
Career total			372	59	10	1	12	2	6	0	400	62

== Honours ==
Chelsea Youth

- Professional U21 Development League: 2013-14

England U17

- FA International U17 Tournament: 2011
- Algarve Tournament: 2012

England U20

- Four Nation Tournament: 2014

England U21

- Toulon Tournament: 2016
