= Jovan Malcolm =

English footballer (born 2002)

Personal information
- Full name: Jovan Anthony Malcolm
- Date of birth: 10 December 2002 (age 23)
- Position: Forward

Team information
- Current team: York City (on loan from Stevenage)

Youth career
- West Bromwich Albion

Senior career*
Years	Team	Apps	(Gls)
2021–2024	West Bromwich Albion	1	(0)
2021–2022	→ Accrington Stanley (loan)	10	(0)
2022	→ Solihull Moors (loan)	2	(0)
2023–2024	→ Cheltenham Town (loan)	7	(0)
2024–2025	Gateshead	37	(8)
2025–	Stevenage	8	(0)
2026	→ Barrow (loan)	13	(1)
2026–	→ York City (loan)	11	(3)
- * Club domestic league appearances and goals as of 14:31, 22 November 2026 (UTC)

Jovan Anthony Malcolm (born 10 December 2002) is an English professional footballer who plays as a forward for EFL League Two club York City, on loan from EFL League One club Stevenage.

== Career ==
Malcolm began his career with West Bromwich Albion, having joined their academy at the age of six, and in 2019 was linked with a transfer away from the club. He signed a new three-year contract with the club in July 2021.

He moved on loan to League One club Accrington Stanley in August 2021. He had also been linked with a move to Shrewsbury Town. He made his Accrington debut on 4 September, appearing as a substitute alongside Ethan Hamilton, who was also making his debut. The loan was terminated in January 2022 after Malcolm was recalled by West Bromwich Albion.

On 11 February 2022, Malcolm joined National League side Solihull Moors on a one-month loan deal. He made his Solihull debut a few days later, in the FA Trophy.

On 17 January 2023, he made his first team debut and for West Brom in a 4–0 home win against Chesterfield, appearing as a substitute in a FA Cup third round replay match, and scoring the last of West Brom's goals. On 26 April 2023, he made his Football League debut for West Brom, in a 2–0 away defeat against Sheffield United.

He moved on loan to League One club Cheltenham Town in September 2023. He was sent back to his parent club on 2 January 2024.

He was released by West Brom at the end of the 2023–24 season.

On 21 September 2024, Malcolm joined National League side Gateshead on a two-year deal, having previously appeared for them in pre-season as a trialist.

On 11 August 2025, Malcolm joined League One side Stevenage for a five-figure transfer fee, signing a two year contract. On 29 January 2026, Malcolm joined League Two side Barrow on loan until the end of the season.

In August 2026, Malcolm joined York City on loan until January 2027.

== Career statistics ==
As of match played 21 November 2026

Appearances and goals by club, season and competition
Club	Season	League			FA Cup		League Cup		Other		Total	
Club	Season	Division	Apps	Goals	Apps	Goals	Apps	Goals	Apps	Goals	Apps	Goals
West Bromwich Albion	2020–21	Premier League	0	0	0	0	0	0	2 (Note: Appearances in EFL Trophy)	0	2	0
West Bromwich Albion	2021–22	Championship	0	0	0	0	0	0	0	0	0	0
West Bromwich Albion	2022–23	Championship	1	0	2	1	0	0	0	0	3	1
West Bromwich Albion	2023–24	Championship	0	0	1	1	1	0	0	0	2	1
West Bromwich Albion	Total		1	0	3	2	1	0	2	0	7	2
Accrington Stanley (loan)	2021–22	League One	10	0	1	0	0	0	2	1	13	1
Solihull Moors (loan)	2021–22	National League	2	0	0	0	—		1 (Note: Appearance(s) in FA Trophy)	0	3	0
Cheltenham Town (loan)	2023–24	League One	7	0	0	0	0	0	3	0	10	0
Gateshead	2024–25	National League	37	8	2	0	3	2	6 (Note: 2 appearances and 1 goal in the FA Trophy, 4 appearances and 3 goals in the National League Cup.)	4	47	14
Stevenage	2025–26	League One	8	0	1	0	1	0	4	1	14	1
Stevenage	2026–27	League One	0	0	0	0	0	0	0	0	0	0
Stevenage	Total		8	0	1	0	1	0	4	1	14	1
Barrow (loan)	2025–26	League Two	13	1	0	0	0	0	0	0	13	1
York City (loan)	2026–27	League Two	11	3	1	0	0	0	3	0	15	3
Career total			89	12	8	2	5	2	21	6	123	22

== Honours ==
West Bromwich Albion U23

- Premier League Cup winner: 2021–22
