= 2022–23 West Bromwich Albion F.C. season =

West Bromwich Albion
2022–23 season
- Owner: Lai Guochuan
- Chairman: Lai Guochuan
- Manager: Steve Bruce (until 10 October); Richard Beale (caretaker, 10 October–25 October); Carlos Corberán (from 25 October)
- Stadium: The Hawthorns
- Championship: 9th
- FA Cup: Fourth round
- EFL Cup: Second round
- Top goalscorer: League: Brandon Thomas-Asante (7) & Daryl Dike (7); All: Brandon Thomas-Asante (9)
- Highest home attendance: 25,322 (v Reading, 2 January)
- Lowest home attendance: 19,786 (v Blackpool, 1 November)
- Average home league attendance: 23,113
- Biggest win: 4-0 (vs. Chesterfield, 17 January 2023, FA Cup)
- Biggest defeat: 3-0 (vs. Bristol City F.C., 28 January 2023, FA Cup)
Home colours	Away colours	Third colours

The 2022–23 season was the 145th season of West Bromwich Albion Football Club and the club's second consecutive season in the Championship. In addition to the league, they also competed in the 2022–23 FA Cup and the 2022–23 EFL Cup.

On 10 October 2022, manager Steve Bruce was sacked after winning only one of their first thirteen league games, leaving the club in the relegation places. Spanish coach and former Marcelo Bielsa understudy Carlos Corberán was appointed as his successor on 25 October.

The season also saw increased scrutiny of the club's ownership, and the practices of majority shareholder Guochuan Lai. The club's financial situation began to receive national media attention, having already been commented on frequently in local press. Supporter action groups and in-stadium protests by fans to raise awareness of the club's off-field issues took shape during the season.

== Transfers ==
=== In ===
Date	Pos	Player	Transferred from	Fee	Ref
1 July 2022	CF	(England) Ramello Mitchell	(England) Southampton	Free Transfer	
1 July 2022 (Note: The transfer was announced on 4 May, and would become official on July 1 once the transfer window opened)	CM	(Republic of Ireland) Jayson Molumby	(England) Brighton & Hove Albion	Undisclosed	
1 July 2022 (Note: The transfer was announced on 26 May, and would become official on July 1, once his Reading contract expired)	CM	(England) John Swift	(England) Reading	Free Transfer	
1 July 2022 (Note: The transfer was announced on 23 June, and would become official on July 1, once his Millwall contract expired)	RW	(England) Jed Wallace	(England) Millwall	Free Transfer	
18 July 2022	DM	(Turkey) Okay Yokuşlu	(Spain) Celta Vigo	Free Transfer	
31 August 2022	CF	(England) Brandon Thomas-Asante	(England) Salford City	Undisclosed	
1 September 2022	RB	(England) Martin Kelly	(England) Crystal Palace	Free Transfer	
12 September 2022	AM	(Australia) Tom Rogic	(Scotland) Celtic	Free Transfer	
13 September 2022	LB	(Netherlands) Erik Pieters	(England) Burnley	Free Transfer	
31 January 2023	DM	(England) Nathaniel Chalobah	(England) Fulham	Undisclosed	

=== Out ===
Date	Pos	Player	Transferred to	Fee	Ref
22 June 2022	CF	(England) Callum Morton	(England) Fleetwood Town	Undisclosed	
30 June 2022	CF	(England) Andy Carroll	(England) Reading	Released	
30 June 2022	CB	(England) Mark Chidi	Unattached	Released	
30 June 2022	LB	(Republic of Ireland) Zak Delaney	(Scotland) Inverness Caledonian Thistle	Released	
30 June 2022	GK	(England) Sam Johnstone	(England) Crystal Palace	Released	
30 June 2022	CB	(Republic of Ireland) Kevin Joshua	Peterhead	Released	
30 June 2022	CM	(Scotland) MacKenzie Lamb	(England) Peterborough United	Released	
30 June 2022	CB	(England) Leon Machisa	Unattached	Released	
30 June 2022	DF	(England) Daniel Ngoma	Unattached	Released	
30 June 2022	AM	(Saint Kitts and Nevis) Romaine Sawyers	(Wales) Cardiff City	Released	
30 June 2022	CB	(England) Saul Shotton	(England) Hanley Town	Free Transfer	
30 June 2022	CF	(England) Jamie Soule	Alvechurch	Released	
30 June 2022	CM	(Portugal) Áurio Teixeira	Alvechurch	Released	
30 June 2022	CF	(England) Owen Windsor	Chippenham Town	Released	
1 September 2022	LW	(Republic of Ireland) Callum Robinson	(Wales) Cardiff City	Undisclosed	
31 January 2023	CF	(Denmark) Kenneth Zohore	Unattached	Mutual Consent	

=== Loans in ===
Date	Pos	Player	Loaned from	On loan until	Ref
31 January 2023	RM	(England) Marc Albrighton	(England) Leicester City	End of Season	

=== Loans out ===
Date	Pos	Player	Loaned to	On loan until	Ref
14 July 2022	CM	(Portugal) Quévin Castro	(England) Burton Albion	1 September 2022 (Note: On 1 September, Castro's loan was terminated by mutual consent.)	
14 July 2022	GK	(England) Josh Griffiths	(England) Portsmouth	11 January 2023 (Note: On 11 January, Griffiths was recalled from his loan at Portsmouth)	
15 July 2022	CB	(Ivory Coast) Cédric Kipré	(Wales) Cardiff City	End of Season	
22 July 2022	CB	(England) Caleb Taylor	(England) Cheltenham Town	End of Season	
8 August 2022	SS	(England) Rayhaan Tulloch	(England) Rochdale	6 January 2023 (Note: On 6 January, Tulloch's loan at Rochdale was cut short)	
13 August 2022	CM	(England) Alex Mowatt	(England) Middlesbrough	End of Season	
1 September 2022	RM	(England) Tom Fellows	(England) Crawley Town	End of Season	
12 September 2022	CM	(Portugal) Quévin Castro	(England) Notts County	1 January 2023	
28 October 2022	CF	(The Gambia) Modou Faal	(England) AFC Telford United	28 November 2022	
31 October 2022	CM	(England) Jamie Andrews	(England) Yeovil Town	2 January 2023 (Note: On 30 November, Andrews' loan at Yeovil was extended.)	
2 December 2022	CF	(The Gambia) Modou Faal	(England) AFC Fylde	6 March 2023 (Note: On 5 January, Faal's loan at AFC Fylde was extended until end of the season, but on 6 March it was announced Faal returned to WBA)	
6 January 2023	GK	(Wales) Ronnie Hollingshead	(England) Hednesford Town	3 February 2023	
13 January 2023	CM	(Portugal) Quévin Castro	(England) Gateshead	End of Season	
17 January 2023	LB	(Wales) Zac Ashworth	(England) Burton Albion	End of Season	
30 January 2023	RB	(England) Martin Kelly	(England) Wigan Athletic	End of Season	
7 February 2023	GK	(England) Ted Cann	(England) Leamington	End of Season (Note: On 7 March, Ted's loan at Leamington was extended until the end of the season)	
22 February 2023	SS	(England) Rayhaan Tulloch	(Republic of Ireland) Dundalk	End of Season	

== Statistics ==
No.	Pos	Nat	Player	Total		Championship		FA Cup		League Cup	
No.	Pos	Nat	Player	Apps	Goals	Apps	Goals	Apps	Goals	Apps	Goals
1	GK	(England) ENG	David Button	16	0	13	0	3	0	0	0
2	DF	(England) ENG	Darnell Furlong	41	2	40	2	1	0	0	0
3	DF	(England) ENG	Conor Townsend	48	3	46	3	1	0	1	0
4	DF	(Republic of Ireland) IRL	Dara O'Shea	41	2	37	2	2	0	2	0
5	DF	(England) ENG	Kyle Bartley	15	2	13	2	0	0	2	0
6	DF	(Nigeria) NGR	Semi Ajayi	25	2	22	2	3	0	0	0
7	MF	(Australia) AUS	Tom Rogić	23	2	20	1	3	1	0	0
8	MF	(England) ENG	Jake Livermore	21	2	17	1	3	1	1	0
10	MF	(Scotland) SCO	Matt Phillips	28	2	25	2	1	0	2	0
11	FW	(England) ENG	Grady Diangana	35	4	31	4	3	0	1	0
12	FW	(United States) USA	Daryl Dike	24	7	22	7	2	0	0	0
14	MF	(Republic of Ireland) IRL	Jayson Molumby	47	4	43	4	3	0	1	0
15	DF	(Netherlands) NED	Erik Pieters	36	0	36	0	0	0	0	0
16	DF	(England) ENG	Martin Kelly	7	0	5	0	2	0	0	0
17	MF	(England) ENG	Jed Wallace	50	6	46	6	3	0	1	0
18	FW	(England) ENG	Karlan Grant	35	5	31	3	2	1	2	1
19	MF	(England) ENG	John Swift	48	6	45	6	1	0	2	0
20	MF	(England) ENG	Adam Reach	23	0	18	0	3	0	2	0
21	FW	(England) ENG	Brandon Thomas-Asante	35	9	33	7	2	2	0	0
24	GK	(England) ENG	Alex Palmer	25	0	23	0	0	0	2	0
26	DF	(Wales) WAL	Zac Ashworth	3	0	0	0	1	0	2	0
28	FW	(England) ENG	Reyes Cleary	5	0	2	0	1	0	2	0
29	MF	(England) ENG	Taylor Gardner-Hickman	35	2	30	2	3	0	2	0
31	MF	(England) ENG	Tom Fellows	2	0	0	0	0	0	2	0
32	FW	(England) ENG	Jovan Malcolm	3	1	1	0	2	1	0	0
34	DF	(England) ENG	Ethan Ingram	1	0	0	0	0	0	1	0
35	MF	(Turkey) TUR	Okay Yokuşlu	41	4	38	4	2	0	1	0
39	MF	(England) ENG	Jamie Andrews	1	0	0	0	1	0	0	0
Players out on loan:
27	MF	(England) ENG	Alex Mowatt	2	0	1	0	0	0	1	0
Players who left the club:
7	FW	(Republic of Ireland) IRL	Callum Robinson	6	0	4	0	0	0	2	0

=== Goals record ===
Rank	No.	Nat.	Po.	Name	Championship	FA Cup	League Cup	Total
1	21	(England)	CF	Brandon Thomas-Asante	7	2	0	9
2	12	(United States)	CF	Daryl Dike	7	0	0	7
2	19	(England)	CM	John Swift	6	1	0	7
4	17	(England)	RW	Jed Wallace	6	0	0	6
5	18	(England)	CF	Karlan Grant	3	1	1	5
6	11	(England)	LW	Grady Diangana	4	0	0	4
6	14	(Republic of Ireland)	DM	Jayson Molumby	4	0	0	4
6	35	(Turkey)	DM	Okay Yokuşlu	4	0	0	4
9	3	(England)	LB	Conor Townsend	3	0	0	3
10	2	(England)	RB	Darnell Furlong	2	0	0	2
10	4	(Republic of Ireland)	CB	Dara O'Shea	2	0	0	2
10	5	(England)	CB	Kyle Bartley	2	0	0	2
10	6	(Nigeria)	CB	Semi Ajayi	2	0	0	2
10	7	(Australia)	AM	Tom Rogić	1	1	0	2
10	8	(England)	CM	Jake Livermore	1	1	0	2
10	10	(Scotland)	RW	Matt Phillips	2	0	0	2
10	29	(England)	RB	Taylor Gardner-Hickman	2	0	0	2
18	32	(England)	FW	Jovan Malcolm	0	1	0	1
18	Own Goals				1	0	0	1
Total					59	7	1	67

=== Disciplinary record ===
As of 15 December 2022

Rank	No.	Nat.	Po.	Name	Championship			FA Cup			League Cup			Total		
Rank	No.	Nat.	Po.	Name	Yellow card	(yellow card) (yellow-red card)	Red card	Yellow card	(yellow card) (yellow-red card)	Red card	Yellow card	(yellow card) (yellow-red card)	Red card	Yellow card	(yellow card) (yellow-red card)	Red card
1	5	(England)	CB	Kyle Bartley	2	1	0	0	0	0	0	0	0	2	1	0
1	14	(Republic of Ireland)	CM	Jayson Molumby	4	0	0	0	0	0	0	0	0	4	0	0
3	4	(Republic of Ireland)	CB	Dara O'Shea	3	0	0	0	0	0	0	0	0	3	0	0
4	2	(England)	RB	Darnell Furlong	2	0	0	0	0	0	0	0	0	2	0	0
4	3	(England)	LB	Conor Townsend	2	0	0	0	0	0	0	0	0	2	0	0
4	8	(England)	CM	Jake Livermore	2	0	0	0	0	0	0	0	0	2	0	0
4	10	(Scotland)	RW	Matt Phillips	2	0	0	0	0	0	0	0	0	2	0	0
4	11	(England)	RW	Grady Diangana	2	0	0	0	0	0	0	0	0	2	0	0
4	17	(England)	RW	Jed Wallace	2	0	0	0	0	0	0	0	0	2	0	0
4	19	(England)	AM	John Swift	2	0	0	0	0	0	0	0	0	2	0	0
4	35	(Turkey)	DM	Okay Yokuşlu	2	0	0	0	0	0	0	0	0	2	0	0
12	1	(England)	GK	David Button	1	0	0	0	0	0	0	0	0	1	0	0
12	6	(Nigeria)	CB	Semi Ajayi	1	0	0	0	0	0	0	0	0	1	0	0
12	15	(Netherlands)	LB	Erik Pieters	1	0	0	0	0	0	0	0	0	1	0	0
12	16	(England)	RB	Martin Kelly	1	0	0	0	0	0	0	0	0	1	0	0
12	29	(England)	RB	Taylor Gardner-Hickman	1	0	0	0	0	0	0	0	0	1	0	0
12	31	(England)	RM	Tom Fellows	0	0	0	0	0	0	1	0	0	1	0	0
Total					30	1	0	0	0	0	1	0	0	31	1	0

== Pre-season and friendlies ==
A pre-season trip to Crewe Alexandra was revealed by the hosts on 18 May 2022. On 31 May, Albion confirmed that trip along with a second friendly against Oxford United. A third away pre-season fixture was added to the schedule, against Northampton Town. A trip to Stevenage was next to be announced by the club. On June 17, the Baggies announced a 10-day training camp in Portimão, which included a behind-closed-doors meeting with Leyton Orient. A home friendly against Hertha BSC was next to be added to the calendar.

During the mid-season break, WBA announced they would face Elche in a behind-closed-doors friendly.

Win Draw Loss Fixtures

4 July 2022 Friendly	West Bromwich Albion	2–1	Leyton Orient	Lagos, Portugal
18:30 WEST	Townsend 8'; Ashworth (?)	Report	Moncur (penalty missed); Kipré 85' (o.g.)	Stadium: Estádio Municipal de Lagos; Attendance: 0 (behind-closed-doors)

9 July 2022 Friendly	Stevenage	2–0	West Bromwich Albion	Stevenage
15:00 BST	Norris 73'; List 81'	Report		Stadium: The Lamex Stadium

13 July 2022 Friendly	Northampton Town	0–3	West Bromwich Albion	Sixfields
19:45 BST		Report	Dike 51'; Grant 72'; Reach 88'	Stadium: Sixfields Stadium

16 July 2022 Friendly	Crewe Alexandra	1–1	West Bromwich Albion	Crewe
15:00 BST	Agyei 73'	Report	Swift 54'	Stadium: Mornflake Stadium

19 July 2022 Friendly	Oxford United	0–3	West Bromwich Albion	Littlemore
19:45 BST		Report	Grant 80', 84'; Sade 88' (o.g.)	Stadium: Kassam Stadium; Attendance: 2,422

23 July 2022 Friendly	West Bromwich Albion	2–1	Hertha BSC	West Bromwich
15:00 BST	Swift 70'; Dike 73'	Report	Selke 13'	Stadium: The Hawthorns

2 December 2022 Friendly	Elche	1–0	West Bromwich Albion	Costa Blanca, Spain
12:00 CET	Ponce 61'	Report		Stadium: TBA; Attendance: 0 (behind-closed-doors)

== Competitions ==
=== Overall record ===
Competition	First match	Last match	Starting round	Record							
Competition	First match	Last match	Starting round	Pld	W	D	L	GF	GA	GD	Win %
Championship	30 July 2022	May 2023	Matchday 1	46	18	12	16	59	53	+6	39.13
FA Cup	7 January 2023	28 January 2023	Third round	3	1	1	1	7	6	+1	33.33
EFL Cup	11 August 2022	23 August 2022	First round	2	1	0	1	1	1	+0	50.00
Total				51	20	13	18	67	60	+7	39.22

Last updated: 8 May 2023
Source: [ Soccerway]

=== Championship ===
==== League table ====
Pos	Team	Pld	W	D	L	GF	GA	GD	Pts	Promotion, qualification or relegation
6	Sunderland	46	18	15	13	68	55	+13	69	Qualification for Championship play-offs
7	Blackburn Rovers	46	20	9	17	52	54	−2	69	
8	Millwall	46	19	11	16	57	50	+7	68	
9	West Bromwich Albion	46	18	12	16	59	53	+6	66	
10	Swansea City	46	18	12	16	68	64	+4	66	
11	Watford	46	16	15	15	56	53	+3	63	
12	Preston North End	46	17	12	17	45	59	−14	63	

Source: EFL Official Website
Rules for classification: 1) Points; 2) Goal difference; 3) Number of goals scored; 4) Head-to-head results; 5) Wins; 6) Away goals; 7) Penalty points (sec 9.5); 8) 12-point sending off offences

==== Results summary ====
Overall								Home						Away					
Pld	W	D	L	GF	GA	GD	Pts	W	D	L	GF	GA	GD	W	D	L	GF	GA	GD
46	18	12	16	59	53	+6	66	11	7	5	31	20	+11	7	5	11	28	33	−5

Last updated: 8 May 2023.
Source: [ Soccerway]

==== Results by round ====
Round	1	2	3	4	5	6	7	8	9	10	11	12	13	14	15	16	17	18	19	20	21	22	23	24	25	26	27	28	29	30	31	32	33	34	35	36	37	38	39	40	41	42	43	44	45	46
Ground	A	H	A	H	H	A	A	H	A	A	H	A	H	A	H	A	H	H	A	H	A	H	A	A	H	H	A	A	H	A	H	A	H	A	H	H	A	H	A	H	A	A	H	A	H	A
Result	D	D	L	D	W	D	D	D	L	D	L	L	D	W	L	L	L	W	W	W	W	W	L	W	W	W	W	L	W	L	D	L	W	L	W	W	D	D	L	D	W	W	L	L	W	L
Position	10	14	21	22	14	15	14	16	20	21	21	22	22	20	22	23	24	23	22	21	17	16	16	14	11	9	6	10	6	6	10	10	10	10	9	8	8	9	10	11	11	7	9	9	8	9

Updated to match(es) played on 29 April 2023. Source: [Soccerway]
A = Away; H = Home; W = Win; D = Draw; L = Loss; P = Postponed

==== Matches ====
Win Draw Loss Fixtures

On 23 June, the league fixtures were announced.

30 July 2022 1	Middlesbrough	1–1	West Bromwich Albion	Middlesbrough
17:30 BST	Jones 10'; Howson (yellow card) 40'; Bola (yellow card) 59'	Report	Swift 51', (yellow card) 61'	Stadium: Riverside Stadium; Attendance: 26,567 (1,533 away); Referee: Tony Harrington
Note: Live on Sky Sports

8 August 2022 2	West Bromwich Albion	1–1	Watford	West Bromwich
20:00 BST	Molumby (yellow card) 45'; Grant 45+2'; Furlong (yellow card) 69'	Report	Sarr 12', (penalty missed) 73'; Kabasele (yellow card) 74'	Stadium: The Hawthorns; Attendance: 22,365 (1,564 away); Referee: Tim Robinson
Note: Live on Sky Sports

14 August 2022 3	Blackburn Rovers	2–1	West Bromwich Albion	Blackburn
15:00 BST	Gallagher (yellow card) 5', (goal) 47'; Brereton Díaz 41'; Buckley (yellow card) 77'; Dack (yellow card) 89'; Travis (yellow card) 90'	Report	Swift (yellow card) 37'; Diangana 59'	Stadium: Ewood Park; Attendance: 14,970 (1,977 away); Referee: Josh Smith

17 August 2022 4	West Bromwich Albion	0–0	Cardiff City	West Bromwich
20:00 BST	O'Shea (yellow card) 21'; Livermore (yellow card) 31'; Molumby (yellow card) 54'	Report	Ojo (yellow card) 33'; Ng (yellow card) 48'; Allsop (yellow card) 72'	Stadium: The Hawthorns; Attendance: 21,820 (1,174 away); Referee: Andrew Madley

20 August 2022 5	West Bromwich Albion	5–2	Hull City	West Bromwich
15:00 BST	Elder 37' (o.g.); Swift 48'; Furlong 55'; Grant 70' (pen.); O'Shea 85'	Report	Estupiñán (yellow card) 34', (goal) 77', 90'; Coyle (yellow card) 53'; Figueiredo (yellow card) 69'	Stadium: The Hawthorns; Attendance: 22,003 (1,130 away); Referee: James Bell

27 August 2022 6	Huddersfield Town	2–2	West Bromwich Albion	Huddersfield
15:00 BST	Anjorin 11', 30'; Rudoni (yellow card) 58'	Report	Wallace 37', 57'; Diangana (yellow card) 90+3'; Ajayi (yellow card) 90+5'	Stadium: The John Smith's Stadium; Attendance: 18,696 (1,624 away); Referee: Andy Davies

30 August 2022 7	Wigan Athletic	1–1	West Bromwich Albion	Wigan
19:45 BST	Magennis 6', (yellow card) 45+3'; McClean (yellow card) 69'	Report	Grant 22'; Molumby (yellow card) 73'; Phillips (yellow card) 80'	Stadium: DW Stadium; Attendance: 10,526 (1,233 away); Referee: Andy Woolmer

2 September 2022 8	West Bromwich Albion	1–1	Burnley	West Bromwich
20:00 BST	Button (yellow card) 29'; Thomas-Asante 90+8'	Report	Rodriguez 30' (pen.); Cork (yellow card) 36'; Harwood-Bellis (yellow card) 50'; Roberts (yellow card) 71'; Taylor (yellow card) 80'	Stadium: The Hawthorns; Attendance: 22,704 (1,898 away); Referee: James Linington
Note: Live on Sky Sports

14 September 2022 9	West Bromwich Albion	2–3	Birmingham City	West Bromwich
19:45 BST	Wallace 23'; Townsend (yellow card) 42'; Gardner-Hickman (yellow card) 64'; Thomas-Asante 83' (pen.)	Report	Hogan 14', 54', 71', (yellow card) 90+5'; Sanderson (yellow card) 90+6'	Stadium: The Hawthorns; Attendance: 23,089 (1,987 away); Referee: Josh Smith
Note: Live on Sky Sports

17 September 2022 10	Norwich City	1–1	West Bromwich Albion	Norwich
15:00 BST	Aarons (yellow card) 58'; Byram 68'	Report	O'Shea 9'; Furlong (yellow card) 85'	Stadium: Carrow Road; Attendance: 26,303 (1,297 away); Referee: Thomas Bramall

1 October 2022 11	West Bromwich Albion	2–3	Swansea City	West Bromwich
15:00 BST	Furlong (yellow card) 43'; Pieters (yellow card) 47'; Livermore 48'; Rogic (yellow card) 53'; Diangana 65'; Grant (penalty missed) 82'	Report	Sorinola 6'; Manning (yellow card) 41'; Ntcham 71'; Obafemi 89'	Stadium: The Hawthorns; Attendance: 22,369 (1,743 away); Referee: Graham Scott

5 October 2022 12	Preston North End	1–0	West Bromwich Albion	Preston
20:00 BST	Riis Jakobsen 7'; Whiteman (yellow card) 52'; Storey (yellow card) 90+4'	Report	Diangana (yellow card) 84'	Stadium: Deepdale; Attendance: 13,924 (718 away); Referee: Josh Smith
Note: Live on Sky Sports

8 October 2022 13	West Bromwich Albion	0–0	Luton Town	West Bromwich
15:00 BST	Yokuşlu (yellow card) 59'	Report	Bradley (yellow card) 57'	Stadium: The Hawthorns; Attendance: 21,550 (1,385 away); Referee: David Webb

15 October 2022 14	Reading	0–2	West Bromwich Albion	Reading
15:00 BST	Ince (yellow card) 16'; Loum (yellow card) 34'; McIntyre (yellow card) 49'	Report	Phillips 25' (yellow card) 60'; Gardner-Hickman 72'	Stadium: Select Car Leasing Stadium; Attendance: 14,235 (1,718 away); Referee: Tim Robinson

18 October 2022 15	West Bromwich Albion	0–2	Bristol City	West Bromwich
20:00 BST	Livermore (yellow card) 31'; Kelly (yellow card) 34'; O'Shea (yellow card) 90+1'	Report	Williams 32'; Wells 45'; Sykes (yellow card) 71'	Stadium: The Hawthorns; Attendance: 21,004 (1,468 away); Referee: Bobby Madley

22 October 2022 16	Millwall	2–1	West Bromwich Albion	Bermondsey
15:00 BST	Mitchell (yellow card) 31'; Styles 38'; Burey 90'	Report	Swift 20'; Bartley (yellow card) 68' (yellow-red card) 85'	Stadium: The Den; Attendance: 15,212 (1,481 away); Referee: Andrew Madley

29 October 2022 17	West Bromwich Albion	0–2	Sheffield United	West Bromwich
12:30 BST		Report	Ndiaye 11'; McBurnie 23'; Ahmedhodžić (yellow card) 38'	Stadium: The Hawthorns; Attendance: 22,270 (1,936 away); Referee: Dean Whitestone
Note: Live on Sky Sports

1 November 2022 18	West Bromwich Albion	1–0	Blackpool	West Bromwich
20:00 BST	O'Shea (yellow card) 51'; Bartley (yellow card) 52'; Wallace (yellow card) 58'; Yokuşlu 85' (yellow card) 90+4'	Report	Thorniley (yellow card) 28'; Yates (yellow card) 47'	Stadium: The Hawthorns; Attendance: 19,786 (608 away); Referee: Gavin Ward

5 November 2022 19	Queens Park Rangers	0–1	West Bromwich Albion	Shepherd's Bush
15:00 GMT	Field (yellow card) 68'	Report	Pieters (yellow card) 16'; Bartley 68'; Molumby (yellow card) 90+1'	Stadium: Loftus Road Stadium; Attendance: 17,139 (1,407 away); Referee: Thomas Bramall

12 November 2022 20	West Bromwich Albion	2–0	Stoke City	West Bromwich
15:00 GMT	Bartley 39'; Thomas-Asante 50'; Townsend (yellow card) 90+1'	Report	Thompson (yellow card) 24'; Delap (yellow card) 47'; Brown (yellow card) 90'	Stadium: The Hawthorns; Attendance: 23,728 (1,989 away); Referee: James Bell

Mid-season break for 2022 FIFA World Cup

12 December 2022 21	Sunderland	1–2	West Bromwich Albion	Sunderland
20:00 GMT	Diallo 19' (pen.); Batth (yellow card) 33'	Report	Rogic 70'; Wallace (yellow card) 71'; Dike 82'	Stadium: Stadium of Light; Attendance: 37,432 (689 away); Referee: James Linington
Note: Live on Sky Sports

17 December 2022 22	West Bromwich Albion	3–0	Rotherham United	West Bromwich
15:00 GMT	Wallace 20'; Diangana 57'; Thomas-Asante (penalty missed) 70'; Thomas-Asante 70'; O'Shea (yellow card) 78'	Report	Humphreys (yellow card) 69'; Kelly (yellow card) 72'	Stadium: The Hawthorns; Attendance: 22,519 (1,136 away); Referee: John Busby

21 December 2022 23	Coventry City	1–0	West Bromwich Albion	Coventry
19:45 GMT	Burroughs (yellow card) 64'; Bidwell (yellow card) 85'; Gyökeres 90+3' (pen.)	Report	Gardner-Hickman (yellow card) 90+2'	Stadium: Coventry Building Society Arena; Attendance: 22,519 (4,435 away); Referee: Keith Stroud
Note: Fixture was postponed from 10 September as a mark of respect following the passing of Queen Elizabeth II.

26 December 2022 24	Bristol City	0–2	West Bromwich Albion	Bristol
15:00 GMT	Williams (yellow card) 65'; James (yellow card) 70'	Report	Phillips 9'; Thomas-Asante 75'; Furlong (yellow card) 88'	Stadium: Ashton Gate Stadium; Attendance: 23,181 (2,503 away); Referee: Steve Martin

29 December 2022 25	West Bromwich Albion	2–0	Preston North End	West Bromwich
20:00 GMT	Yokuşlu 36', 57'; Diangana (yellow card) 45+1'	Report	Lindsay (yellow card) 10'	Stadium: The Hawthorns; Attendance: 25,321 (1,972 away); Referee: Andy Woolmer

2 January 2023 26	West Bromwich Albion	1–0	Reading	West Bromwich
15:00 GMT	Dike 60'; Rogic (yellow card) 76'	Report	McIntyre (yellow card) 47'; Hoilett (yellow card) 51'; Lumley (yellow card) 56'; Mbengue (yellow card) 75'	Stadium: The Hawthorns; Attendance: 25,322 (1,085 away); Referee: Tom Nield

14 January 2023 27	Luton Town	2–3	West Bromwich Albion	Luton
15:00 GMT	Morris 7'; Adebayo 10'; Mpanzu (yellow card) 43'; Campbell (yellow card) 88'; Bree (yellow card) 90+6'	Report	Dike 39'; Molumby (yellow card) 62'; Molumby 65'; Townsend 67'; Dike (yellow card) 90+7'	Stadium: Kenilworth Road; Attendance: 10,069 (1,042 away); Referee: Josh Smith

20 January 2023 28	Burnley	2–1	West Bromwich Albion	Burnley
20:00 GMT	Tella 75'; Twine 87'; Maatsen (yellow card) 90+5'	Report	Furlong 7', (yellow card) 42'	Stadium: Turf Moor; Attendance: 19,890 (1,933 away); Referee: Jarred Gillett
Note: Live on Sky Sports

3 February 2023 29	West Bromwich Albion	1–0	Coventry City	West Bromwich
20:00 BST	Diangana 15'; Yokuşlu (yellow card) 64'; Molumby (yellow card) 82'; Furlong (yellow card) 90+2'; O'Shea (yellow card) 90+5'		Panzo (yellow card) 82'	Stadium: The Hawthorns; Attendance: 24,719 (1,980 away); Referee: Gavin Ward

10 February 2023 30	Birmingham City	2–0	West Bromwich Albion	Birmingham
20:00 BST	Mejbri 10' Sanderson (yellow card) 45' Trusty (yellow card) 45+4'; Bielik 52' Jutkiewicz (yellow card) 63'		Yokuslu (yellow card) 45+4'; Wallace (yellow card) 90+2'; Molumby (yellow card) 90+5'	Stadium: St. Andrews Stadium; Attendance: 17,781 (2,244 away); Referee: James Linington
Note: Live on Sky Sports

15 February 2023 31	West Bromwich Albion	1–1	Blackburn Rovers	West Bromwich
20:00 GMT	Albrighton (yellow card) 23'; Pieters (yellow card) 61'; Molumby 73'	Report	Travis (yellow card) 83'; Brereton Díaz 89'	Stadium: The Hawthorns; Attendance: 21,840 (666 away); Referee: David Webb

20 February 2023 32	Watford	3–2	West Bromwich Albion	Watford
20:00 GMT	Sema 23', 78'; Hoedt (yellow card) 31'; Choudhury (yellow card) 46'; Sarr 66'	Report	Pieters (yellow card) 55'; Townsend 56'; Wallace 71'; Molumby (yellow card) 75'	Stadium: Vicarage Road; Attendance: 18,634 (1,970 away); Referee: Tim Robinson
Note: Live on Sky Sports

25 February 2023 33	West Bromwich Albion	2–0	Middlesbrough	West Bromwich
15:00 GMT	Dike 8', 10'	Report	Smith (yellow card) 44'	Stadium: The Hawthorns; Attendance: 25,204 (1,963 away); Referee: Darren Bond

3 March 2023 34	Hull City	2–0	West Bromwich Albion	Kingston upon Hull
20:00 GMT	Tetteh 33'; O'Shea 57' (o.g.)	Report	Moulmby (yellow card) 52'; Gardner-Hickman (yellow card) 90+4'	Stadium: MKM Stadium; Attendance: 17,021 (1,118 away); Referee: James Linington
Note: Live on Sky Sports

7 March 2023 35	West Bromwich Albion	1–0	Wigan Athletic	West Bromwich
20:00 GMT	Dike 27'	Report	Rekik (yellow card) 36'; Magennis (yellow card) 90+1'	Stadium: The Hawthorns; Attendance: 21,552 (534 away); Referee: Rebecca Welch

11 March 2023 36	West Bromwich Albion	1–0	Huddersfield Town	West Bromwich
15:00 GMT	Swift 30' (pen.); O'Shea (yellow card) 80'	Report		Stadium: The Hawthorns; Attendance: 24,685 (685 away); Referee: Dean Whitestone

15 March 2023 37	Cardiff City	1–1	West Bromwich Albion	Leckwith
19:45 GMT	Kaba 65'; Romeo (yellow card) 68'; Harris (yellow card) 88'	Report	Dike 17'; Yokuşlu (yellow card) 33'; Ajayi (yellow card) 90+2'	Stadium: Cardiff City Stadium; Attendance: 17,785 (1,381 away); Referee: Leigh Doughty

1 April 2023 38	West Bromwich Albion	0–0	Millwall	West Bromwich
15:00 BST	Thomas-Asante (yellow card) 57'; Dike (yellow card) 69'	Report	McNamara (yellow card) 54'; Bradshaw (yellow card) 69'; Saville (yellow card) 73'	Stadium: The Hawthorns; Attendance: 24,334 (2,000 away); Referee: Jeremy Simpson

7 April 2023 39	Rotherham United	3–1	West Bromwich Albion	Rotherham
13:00 BST	Hugill 42', 50'; Coventry (yellow card) 48'; Fosu 76'; Rathbone (yellow card) 82'	Report	Swift 32' (pen.); Townsend (yellow card) 68'; Bartley (yellow card) 70'; Grant (yellow card) 74'; Chalobah (yellow card) 78'	Stadium: AESSEAL New York Stadium; Attendance: 11,098 (2,191 away); Referee: Tim Robinson

10 April 2023 40	West Bromwich Albion	2–2	Queens Park Rangers	West Bromwich
15:00 BST	Thomas-Asante 10'; Ajayi 13'	Report	Dykes 22'; Martin 49'; Lowe (yellow card) 81'	Stadium: The Hawthorns; Attendance: 23,969 (1,217 away); Referee: Matt Donohue

15 April 2023 41	Stoke City	1–2	West Bromwich Albion	Stoke-On-Trent
15:00 BST	Brown (yellow card) 21' (goal) 30'; Fox (yellow card) 61'; Pearson (yellow card) 64' (yellow-red card) 90+5'; Powell (yellow card) 87'; Thompson (yellow card) 90+5'	Report	Pieters (yellow card) 44'; Chalobah (yellow card) 72'; Molumby 59', 69'	Stadium: Bet365 Stadium; Attendance: 23,486 (2,608 away); Referee: Andy Woolmer

18 April 2023 42	Blackpool	0–2	West Bromwich Albion	Blackpool
19:45 BST	Fiorini (yellow card) 63'	Report	Thomas-Asante 18'; Chalobah (yellow card) 32'; Furlong (yellow card) 55'; Gardner-Hickman 60'; Albrighton (yellow card) 80'	Stadium: Bloomfield Road; Attendance: 10,705 (1,448 away); Referee: Stephen Martin

22 April 2023 43	West Bromwich Albion	1–2	Sunderland	West Bromwich
12:00 BST	Molumby (yellow card) 24'; Yokuşlu (yellow card) 37'; Swift 45+1' (pen.), (yellow card) 50'	Report	Cirkin 51', 84'; Gelhardt (yellow card) 70'; O'Nien (yellow card) 78'; Gooch (yellow card) 82'	Stadium: The Hawthorns; Attendance: 24,764 (1,954 away); Referee: John Busby
Note: Live on Sky Sports

26 April 2023 44	Sheffield United	2–0	West Bromwich Albion	Sheffield
20:00 BST	Berge 58'; Ahmedhodžić 76'; Egan (yellow card) 84'	Report	Pieters (yellow card) 26'	Stadium: Bramall Lane; Attendance: 30,050 (1,514 away); Referee: Dean Whitestone
Note: Live on Sky Sports

29 April 2023 45	West Bromwich Albion	2–1	Norwich City	Norwich
17:30 BST	Townsend 45+1'; Wallace 56'	Report	Byram (yellow card) 16'; Sargent 41'; Gibbs (yellow card) 53'	Stadium: Carrow Road; Attendance: 24,638 (1,932 away); Referee: Bobby Madley
Note: Live on Sky Sports

8 May 2023 46	Swansea City	3–2	West Bromwich Albion	Swansea
15:00 BST	Cundle 26'; Ntcham 66'; Cooper (yellow card) 81'; Piroe 90+3'	Report	Yokuslu 13'; Ajayi 54'; Thomas-Asante (yellow card) 76'; Gardner-Hickman (yellow card) 85'	Stadium: Swansea.com Stadium; Attendance: 20,294 (2,000 away); Referee: Keith Stroud

=== FA Cup ===
The club entered the competition in the third round and were drawn away to Chesterfield. In the fourth round a trip to Bristol City was confirmed.

Win Draw Loss Fixtures

7 January 2023 Third round	Chesterfield	3–3	West Bromwich Albion	Chesterfield
15:00 GMT	Williams 7'; Dobra 36', 41'; Quigley (yellow card) 64'		Thomas-Asante 2', 90+3'; Grant 17'	Stadium: Technique Stadium; Attendance: 9,819 (1,992 away); Referee: Rebecca Welch

17 January 2023 Third round (replay)	West Bromwich Albion	4–0	Chesterfield	West Bromwich
20:00 GMT	Swift 23'; Rogic 48'; Livermore 54'; Malcolm 90+1'; Ajayi (yellow card) 90+4'	Report	Banks (yellow card) 68'; Dobra (yellow card) 90+3'	Stadium: The Hawthorns; Attendance: 12,638 (2,506 away); Referee: Tim Robinson

28 January 2023 Fourth round	Bristol City	3–0	West Bromwich Albion	Ashton Gate
15:00 GMT	Bell 12', 48'; Scott 28'	Report	Wallace (yellow card) 58'; Furlong (yellow card) 60'	Stadium: Ashton Gate; Attendance: 15,754 (3,414 away); Referee: Matt Donohue

=== EFL Cup ===
Win Draw Loss Fixtures

WBA were drawn at home to Sheffield United in the first round.

11 August 2022 First round	West Bromwich Albion	1–0	Sheffield United	West Bromwich
20:00 BST	Grant 73'	Report		Stadium: The Hawthorns; Attendance: 6,747 (600 away); Referee: David Webb

23 August 2022 Second round	Derby County	1–0	West Bromwich Albion	Derby
19:45 BST	Sibley 15'	Report	Fellows (yellow card) 59'	Stadium: Pride Park Stadium; Attendance: 10,638 (2,500 away); Referee: Bobby Madley

== End of season awards ==
The winners of the 2022/23 end of season West Bromwich Albion awards were announced on 5 May 2023.

- Supporters' Player of the Season - Jayson Molumby
- Players’ Player of the Season – Okay Yokuşlu
- Top Goalscorer – Brandon Thomas-Asante
- Goal of the Season –Brandon Thomas-Asante v Stoke City (H)
- Young Player of the Season – Josh Griffiths
