= Alex Palmer =

English footballer (born 1996)

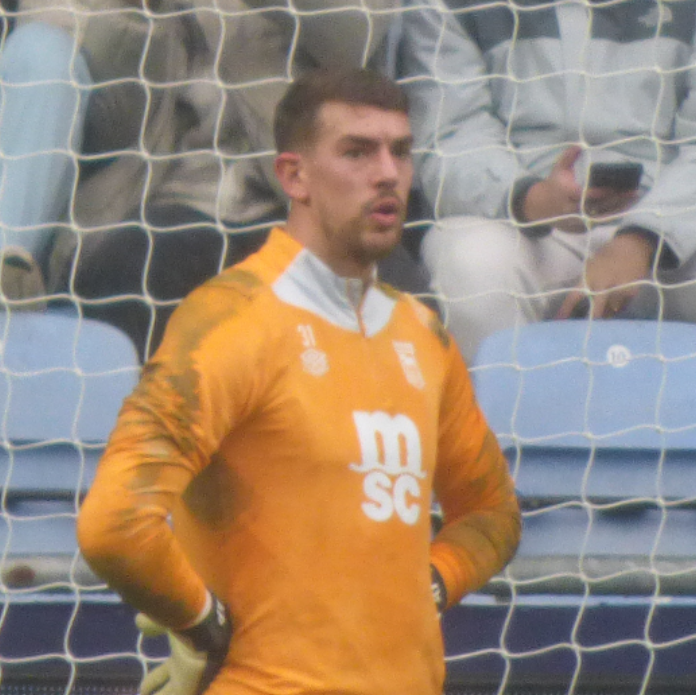
- Palmer warming up for Ipswich Town in 2025

Personal information
- Full name: Alexander Palmer
- Date of birth: 10 August 1996 (age 30)
- Place of birth: Kidderminster, England
- Height: 6 ft 3 in (1.91 m)
- Position: Goalkeeper

Team information
- Current team: Ipswich Town
- Number: 1

Youth career
- –2015: West Bromwich Albion

Senior career*
Years	Team	Apps	(Gls)
2015–2025	West Bromwich Albion	101	(0)
2015	→ Kidderminster Harriers (loan)	11	(0)
2017	→ Kidderminster Harriers (loan)	8	(0)
2018	→ Oldham Athletic (loan)	1	(0)
2019	→ Notts County (loan)	1	(0)
2019–2020	→ Plymouth Argyle (loan)	37	(0)
2020–2021	→ Lincoln City (loan)	46	(0)
2022	→ Luton Town (loan)	2	(0)
2025–	Ipswich Town	23	(0)

International career
2012	England U16	4	(0)
- * Club domestic league appearances and goals as of 15:42, 21 October 2025 (UTC)

Alexander Palmer (born 10 August 1996) is an English professional footballer who plays as a goalkeeper for Premier League club Ipswich Town.

== Club career ==
=== West Bromwich Albion ===
On 24 May 2015, Palmer made the bench for West Bromwich Albion for the first time, remaining as an unused substitute in a 4–1 loss to Arsenal.

==== Loans to lower-league clubs ====
In June 2015, he joined National League side Kidderminster Harriers on a youth loan. Two years later, he joined Kidderminster on another loan deal. On 14 November 2018, he joined League Two side Oldham Athletic on a seven-day emergency loan. Three days later, he made his English Football League debut, playing the full match in a 3–1 win for Oldham over Cambridge United. On 12 April 2019, he went out on another seven-day emergency loan, this time to Notts County, making his only appearance a day later in the 3–0 loss to Crewe Alexandra.

On 16 July 2019, Palmer joined League Two side Plymouth Argyle on a season-long loan deal. Palmer kept a clean sheet on his debut and was widely considered to be man-of-the-match.

On 4 September 2020, it was announced that Palmer had joined Lincoln City on loan for the season, signing with teammate Callum Morton. A day later, he made his debut for Lincoln, starting the game in the EFL Cup.

==== Return to West Bromwich and further loan moves ====
On 25 August 2021, Palmer finally made his West Brom debut after 11 years since joining the club, starting in the 6–0 defeat against Arsenal in the EFL Cup second round.

On 4 March 2022, Palmer joined EFL Championship side Luton Town on an emergency loan deal following injuries to goalkeepers Jed Steer and James Shea.

On 5 October 2022, Palmer finally made his league debut for West Brom in a 1–0 away defeat at Preston North End, after a poor run of form made manager Steve Bruce decide to drop David Button. He made his first clean sheet for the club three days later in a 0–0 home draw against Luton Town.

=== Ipswich Town ===
On 3 February 2025, Palmer joined Premier League club Ipswich Town for an undisclosed fee.

On his Premier League debut against Aston Villa, even after conceding a goal, Palmer was praised for his performance as he earned his relegation fighting Ipswich side a valuable point after a crucial save in the 93rd minute.

== International career ==
Palmer has represented England at under-16 level on four occasions.

== Career statistics ==
As of match played 13 February 2026

Appearances and goals by club, season and competition
Club	Season	League			FA Cup		League Cup		Other		Total	
Club	Season	Division	Apps	Goals	Apps	Goals	Apps	Goals	Apps	Goals	Apps	Goals
West Bromwich Albion	2015–16	Premier League	0	0	0	0	0	0	—		0	0
West Bromwich Albion	2016–17	Premier League	0	0	0	0	0	0	—		0	0
West Bromwich Albion	2017–18	Premier League	0	0	0	0	0	0	—		0	0
West Bromwich Albion	2018–19	Championship	0	0	0	0	0	0	—		0	0
West Bromwich Albion	2019–20	Championship	0	0	0	0	0	0	—		0	0
West Bromwich Albion	2020–21	Premier League	0	0	0	0	0	0	—		0	0
West Bromwich Albion	2021–22	Championship	0	0	0	0	1	0	—		1	0
West Bromwich Albion	2022–23	Championship	23	0	0	0	2	0	—		25	0
West Bromwich Albion	2023–24	Championship	46	0	0	0	0	0	2 (Note: Appearances in the Championship play-offs)	0	46	0
West Bromwich Albion	2024–25	Championship	30	0	0	0	0	0	—		30	0
West Bromwich Albion	Total		99	0	0	0	3	0	2	0	104	0
West Bromwich Albion U23	2016–17	—			—		—		1 (Note: Appearances in EFL Trophy)	0	1	0
West Bromwich Albion U23	2017–18	—			—		—		3	0	3	0
Kidderminster Harriers (loan)	2015–16	National League	11	0	1	0	—		—		12	0
Kidderminster Harriers (loan)	2016–17	National League North	8	0	0	0	—		2 (Note: Appearances in FA Trophy)	0	10	0
Oldham Athletic (loan)	2018–19	League Two	1	0	—		—		—		1	0
Notts County (loan)	2018–19	League Two	1	0	—		—		—		1	0
Plymouth Argyle (loan)	2019–20	League Two	37	0	3	0	—		1	0	41	0
Lincoln City (loan)	2020–21	League One	46	0	2	0	3	0	7 (Note: Two appearances in League One play-offs and five appearances in EFL Trophy)	0	58	0
Luton Town (loan)	2021–22	Championship	2	0	—		—		—		2	0
Ipswich Town	2024–25	Premier League	13	0	2	0	—		—		15	0
Ipswich Town	2025–26	Championship	10	0	2	0	0	0	—		12	0
Ipswich Town	Total		23	0	4	0	0	0	—		27	0
Career total			196	0	10	0	6	0	16	0	228	0

== Honours ==
Plymouth Argyle

- EFL League Two third-place promotion: 2019–20

Ipswich Town

- EFL Championship runner-up: 2025–26

Individual

- PFA Fans' Player of the Year: 2019–20 League Two
- PFA Team of the Year: 2019–20 League Two
- EFL Championship Golden Glove: 2023–24(shared)
