= Darnell Furlong =

English footballer (born 1995)

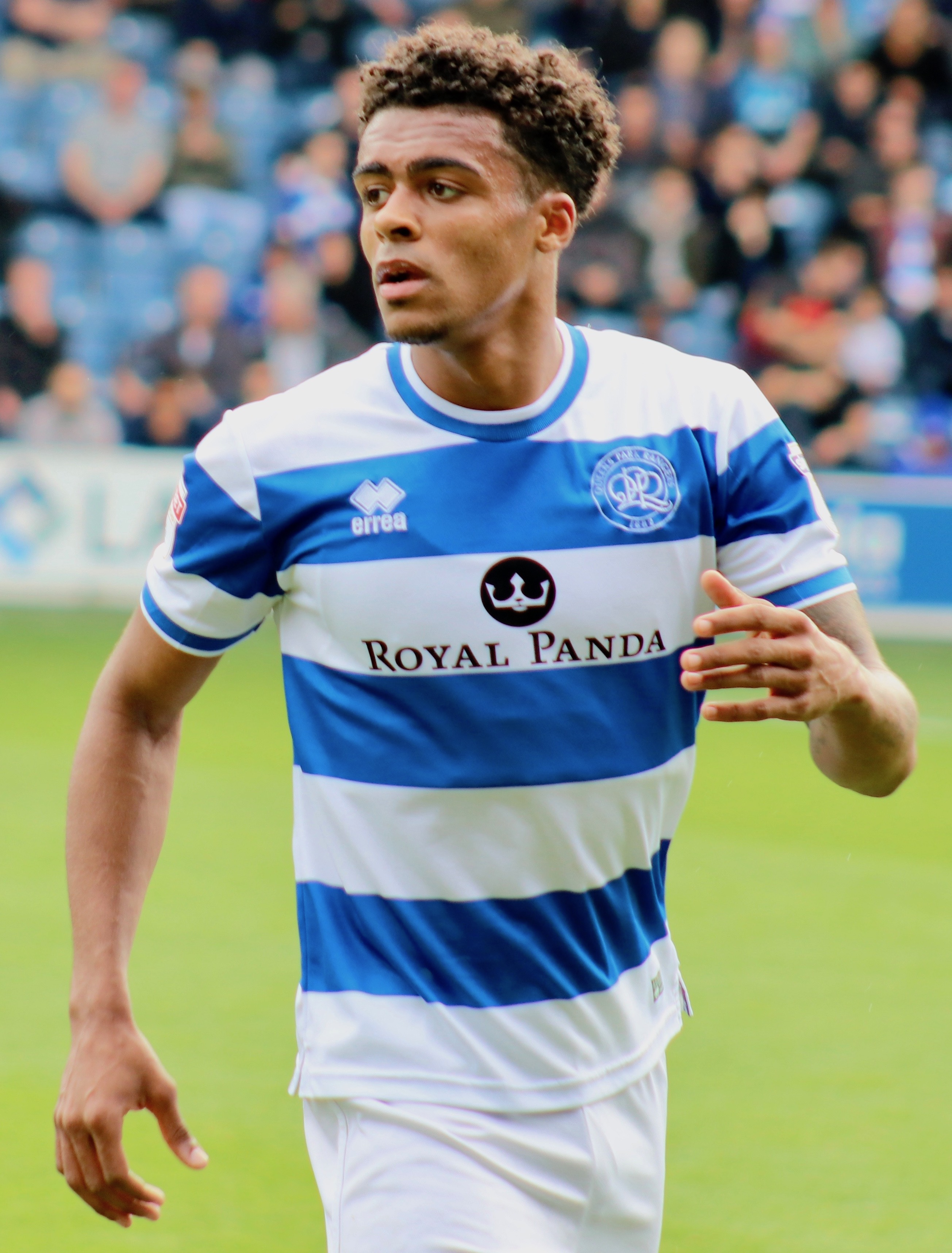
- Furlong playing for Queens Park Rangers in 2017

Personal information
- Full name: Darnell Anthony Furlong
- Date of birth: 31 October 1995 (age 31)
- Place of birth: Luton, Bedfordshire, England
- Height: 6 ft 0 in (1.83 m)
- Position: Right-back

Team information
- Current team: Ipswich Town
- Number: 2

Youth career
- 2006–2015: Queens Park Rangers

Senior career*
Years	Team	Apps	(Gls)
2015–2019	Queens Park Rangers	64	(1)
2015	→ Northampton Town (loan)	10	(0)
2016	→ Cambridge United (loan)	21	(0)
2016–2017	→ Swindon Town (loan)	24	(2)
2019–2025	West Bromwich Albion	238	(11)
2025–	Ipswich Town	41	(1)
- * Club domestic league appearances and goals as of 30 August 2026 (UTC)

Darnell Anthony Furlong (born 31 October 1995) is an English professional footballer who plays as a right-back for Premier League club Ipswich Town.

== Career ==
=== Queens Park Rangers ===
Having impressed at junior level, Darnell signed his first professional contract with the club in March 2014. Furlong's Premier League and senior debut for Queens Park Rangers came on 21 February 2015 at the age of 19 in the 2–1 defeat against Hull City at The KC Stadium. Furlong was named in the starting line up by Head Coach Chris Ramsey and played the full 90 minutes. Furlong's second senior appearance came on 4 March 2015 for Queens Park Rangers at home to Arsenal, the Hoops lost the game 2–1, with Furlong playing the full 90 minutes.

==== Northampton Town (loan) ====
On 11 September 2015, Furlong joined Northampton Town on a month's loan to gain first team experience. The following day, Furlong made his debut in a 1–0 victory over Oxford United, playing the full 90 minutes. Furlong went on to make nine more league appearances for Northampton Town before returning to Queens Park Rangers in November 2015. Northampton later went on to win the League Two title without Furlong.

==== Cambridge United (loan) ====
On 5 January 2016, Furlong signed for Cambridge United on a one-month loan deal. On 9 January 2016, Furlong made his Cambridge United debut in a 1–0 away defeat against Crawley Town, playing the full 90 minutes. On 8 February 2016, after impressing within the first month of his loan spell with Cambridge United, Furlong's loan spell at the Abbey Stadium was extended for a further month. On 12 March 2016, Furlong started for Cambridge against Northampton, the team he had been on loan to at the start of the season. The match finished 1–1 with a dramatic late equaliser by Cambridge. On 19 April 2016, Cambridge defeated Morecambe 7–0, with Furlong contributing with an assist. The result matched Cambridge's record of their biggest ever league victory. After numerous loan extensions to Furlong's Cambridge United career, he returned to Queens Park Rangers at the end of the 2015–16 campaign having played for every minute of every league game for Cambridge since his signing.

==== Swindon Town (loan) ====
On 12 August 2016, Furlong joined League One side Swindon Town on a season-long loan. A day later, Furlong made his debut in a 3–1 defeat against Chesterfield, in which he netted Swindon's consolation goal in the 88th minute, the first competitive professional goal of his career. On 18 October 2016, Furlong opened the scoring for the Robins in the 24th minute, as Swindon went on to defeat Rochdale 3–0. He was recalled by QPR on 2 January 2017, having started in all but three of Swindon's league games, and appearing in all but 1, from the time of his arrival, until his departure.

==== Return to Queens Park Rangers ====
After Furlong was recalled from his loan at Swindon, he returned to the starting line up on 12 January 2017 (his first league appearance for the club in almost two years) as QPR pulled off an upset against promotion hopefuls Reading, 1–0 away from home, in which Furlong played the full 90 minutes. Under new boss Ian Holloway, Furlong saw a prolonged duration in the side in the form of a right back/right wing back. Shortly after returning from his loan spell, Furlong's sudden involvement with the first team earned him a two-year contract extension until the summer of 2019. On the contract extension, Furlong said "it's a massive boost for me personally and a fresh chance. I've really enjoyed the last few weeks and it's given me a taste of first team football at QPR. I've signed this new deal and I can really focus on kicking on." He scored his first goal for QPR in an EFL Cup tie against Brentford on 22 August 2017.

=== West Bromwich Albion ===
On 23 July 2019, Furlong signed for West Bromwich Albion for an undisclosed fee, signing a four-year deal with the club. He made his debut for the club on 13 August 2019 in the EFL Cup, in a 2–1 defeat to Millwall. He scored his first goal for West Bromwich Albion against Huddersfield Town in the Championship on 22 September 2019. His first Premier League goal came on 12 December 2020, in a 2–1 defeat to Newcastle United.

On 5 August 2021, Furlong signed a new four-year contract until 2025. On 18 October 2024, he signed a further contract extension until 2027.

=== Ipswich Town ===
On 28 August 2025, Furlong joined Ipswich Town on a three-year contract for a reported £4 million fee. He made his debut for the club on 12 September 2025, in a 5–0 win against Sheffield United. On 22 April 2026, he scored his first goal for the club in a 2–1 victory over Charlton Athletic.

== Personal life ==
Furlong is the son of former Coventry, Chelsea, Watford, Queens Park Rangers, Birmingham City, and Luton Town striker Paul Furlong, who is an academy coach at QPR. He is also eligible to play for Montserrat.

== Career statistics ==
As of match played 30 August 2026

Appearances and goals by club, season and competition
Club	Season	League			FA Cup		League Cup		Other		Total	
Club	Season	Division	Apps	Goals	Apps	Goals	Apps	Goals	Apps	Goals	Apps	Goals
Queens Park Rangers	2014–15	Premier League	3	0	0	0	0	0	—		3	0
Queens Park Rangers	2015–16	Championship	0	0	—		1	0	—		1	0
Queens Park Rangers	2016–17	Championship	14	0	—		1	0	—		15	0
Queens Park Rangers	2017–18	Championship	22	0	0	0	2	1	—		24	1
Queens Park Rangers	2018–19	Championship	25	1	4	0	0	0	—		29	1
Queens Park Rangers	Total		64	1	4	0	4	1	0	0	72	2
Northampton Town (loan)	2015–16	League Two	10	0	0	0	—		1 (Note: Appearances in EFL Trophy)	0	11	0
Cambridge United (loan)	2015–16	League Two	21	0	—		—		—		21	0
Swindon Town (loan)	2016–17	League One	24	2	1	0	—		3	0	28	2
West Bromwich Albion	2019–20	Championship	31	2	1	0	1	0	—		33	2
West Bromwich Albion	2020–21	Premier League	35	1	1	0	0	0	—		36	1
West Bromwich Albion	2021–22	Championship	41	0	1	0	0	0	—		42	0
West Bromwich Albion	2022–23	Championship	40	2	1	0	0	0	—		41	2
West Bromwich Albion	2023–24	Championship	46	5	1	0	0	0	2 (Note: Appearances in the EFL Championship play-offs)	0	49	5
West Bromwich Albion	2024–25	Championship	42	1	1	0	0	0	—		43	1
West Bromwich Albion	2025–26	Championship	3	0	—		0	0	—		3	0
West Bromwich Albion	Total		238	11	6	0	1	0	2	0	247	11
Ipswich Town	2025–26	Championship	40	1	0	0	—		—		40	1
Ipswich Town	2026–27	Premier League	1	0	0	0	1	0	—		2	0
Ipswich Town	Total		41	1	0	0	1	0	0	0	42	1
Career total			398	15	11	0	6	1	6	0	421	16

== Honours ==
Ipswich Town

- EFL Championship runner-up: 2025–26
