= Tom Fellows =

English footballer (born 2003)

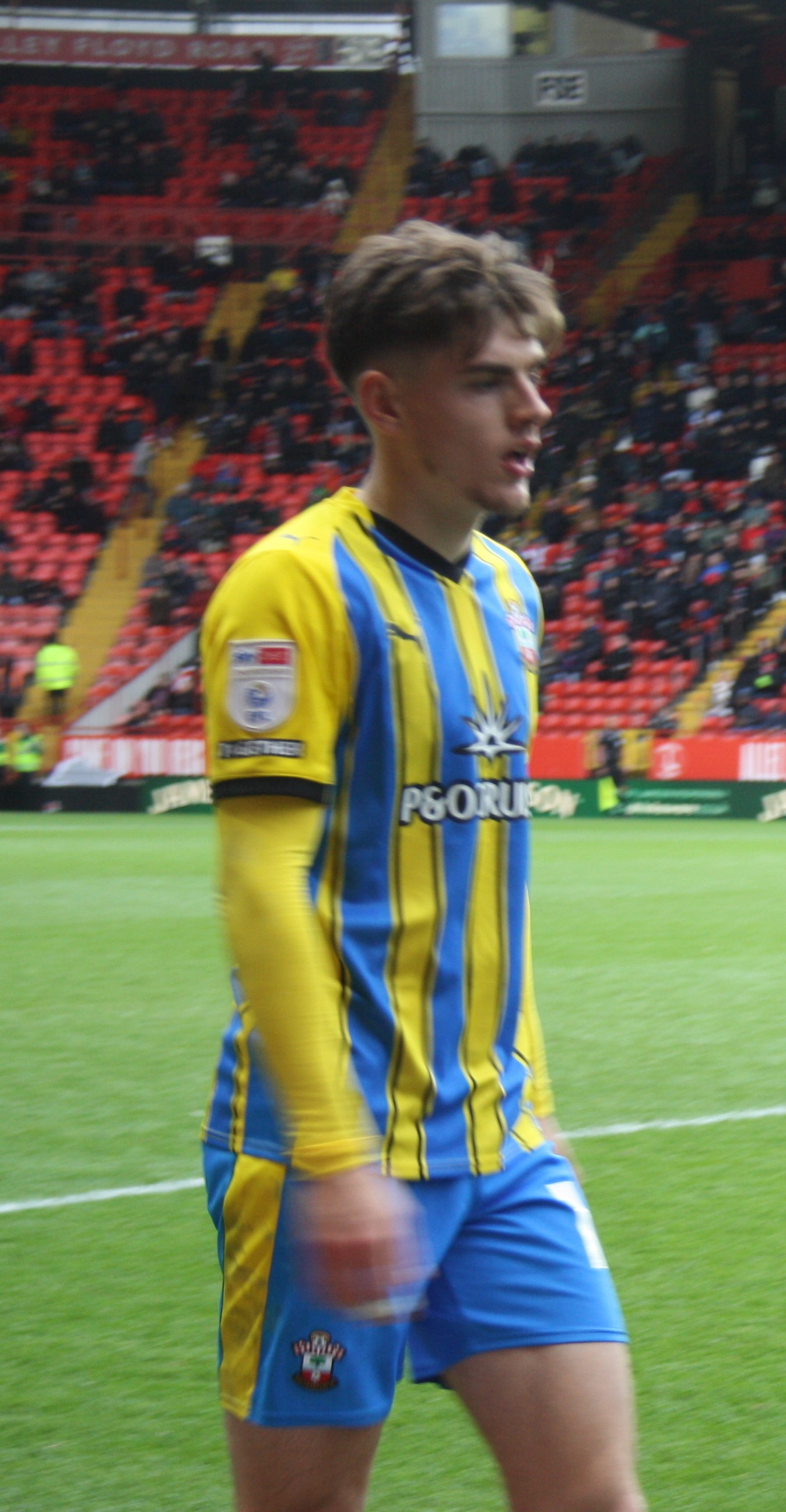
- Fellows with Southampton in 2025

Personal information
- Full name: Tom Allen Fellows
- Date of birth: 25 July 2003 (age 23)
- Place of birth: Birmingham, England
- Height: 6 ft 0 in (1.83 m)
- Positions: Forward; attacking midfielder; winger

Team information
- Current team: Southampton
- Number: 18

Youth career
- 2012–2021: West Bromwich Albion

Senior career*
Years	Team	Apps	(Gls)
2021–2025	West Bromwich Albion	85	(8)
2022–2023	→ Crawley Town (loan)	38	(0)
2025–	Southampton	46	(1)

International career^{‡}
2024	England U20	2	(0)
2024–2025	England U21	3	(1)
Medal record
Men's football
Representing England
UEFA European Under-21 Championship
Winner	2025 Slovakia
- * Club domestic league appearances and goals as of 15:36, 21 November 2026 (UTC) ‡ National team caps and goals as of 13:22, 19 June 2025 (UTC)

Tom Allen Fellows (born 25 July 2003) is an English professional footballer who plays as a forward, attacking midfielder or winger for EFL Championship club Southampton and the England U21 national team.

Fellows is a product of the West Bromwich Albion academy and made his professional debut for the club in August 2021. He spent the 2022–23 season on loan at Crawley Town. In August 2025, Fellows moved to Southampton. He has represented his country, England, at youth levels.

== Personal and early life ==
Fellows grew up in Longbrdige, in the West Midlands, in a family that supported Birmingham City.

== Club career ==
=== West Bromwich Albion ===
==== Early career ====
Fellows joined West Bromwich Albion at under-10s level. On 6 July 2021, he signed his first professional contract with the club, penning a three-year deal until 2024. He made his professional debut for the club on 25 August 2021, starting in a 6–0 EFL Cup second round defeat to Arsenal. He made his league debut on 11 December 2021, coming on as a substitute for Callum Robinson in a 1–0 win against Reading.

==== Crawley Town (loan) ====
On 1 September 2022, Fellows joined EFL League Two club Crawley Town on a season-long loan. He made his debut for the club on 3 September 2022, in a 2–2 draw with Salford City.

==== First-team breakthrough ====
On 7 January 2024, Fellows scored his first career goal in a 4–1 home win against Aldershot Town in a FA Cup third round game. Six days later, he scored his first league goal in a 4–1 home win against Blackburn Rovers. On 26 January 2024, he signed a new contract with the club until 2027. He was named the clubs 2023–24 Young Player of the Year for his performances during the season. He won the award for a second time the following season.

=== Southampton ===
On 29 August 2025, Fellows joined Southampton on a four-year contract, for a reported initial fee of £8 million, plus £2 million in potential add-ons. He made his debut for the club on 14 September in a 0–0 draw with Portsmouth. After the game, Fellows was accused by Portsmouth manager John Mousinho of trying to injure players after he nudged Connor Ogilvie into Nicolas Schmid – Ogilvie was replaced at half-time with a neck issue whilst Schmid went to hospital with a wrist injury. Fellows ended the season with 43 appearances in all competitions, and in April 2026 he admitted he was hopeful to add more goals and assists.

On 29 August 2026, Fellows scored his first goal for the club in a 5–1 victory against Millwall.

== International career ==
On 22 March 2024, Fellows made his debut for the England under-20 side starting in a 5–1 win over Poland at the Bialystok City Stadium during the 2023–24 Under 20 Elite League.

On 6 September 2024, Fellows made his England U21 debut as a late substitute during a 0–0 draw with Northern Ireland at Ballymena Showgrounds. Three days later, he scored his first goal for the age group during a 4–1 win over Austria at Kenilworth Road.

Fellows was not initially included in the England squad for the 2025 UEFA European Under-21 Championship but was subsequently called up as a replacement for Jobe Bellingham. His only appearance of the tournament came in a group stage defeat against Germany. Fellows was an unused substitute in the final which England won to lift the trophy.

== Career statistics ==
As of 21 November 2026

Appearances and goals by club, season and competition
Club	Season	League			FA Cup		EFL Cup		Other		Total	
Club	Season	Division	Apps	Goals	Apps	Goals	Apps	Goals	Apps	Goals	Apps	Goals
West Bromwich Albion U23	2020–21	—			—		—		1 (Note: Appearances in the EFL Trophy)	0	1	0
West Bromwich Albion	2021–22	Championship	4	0	1	0	1	0	—		6	0
West Bromwich Albion	2022–23	Championship	0	0	0	0	2	0	—		2	0
West Bromwich Albion	2023–24	Championship	33	4	2	1	1	0	2 (Note: Appearances in the Championship play-offs)	0	38	5
West Bromwich Albion	2024–25	Championship	45	4	1	0	0	0	—		46	4
West Bromwich Albion	2025–26	Championship	3	0	0	0	1	0	—		4	0
West Bromwich Albion	Total		85	8	4	1	5	0	2	0	96	9
Crawley Town (loan)	2022–23	League Two	38	0	1	0	0	0	1	0	40	0
Southampton	2025–26	Championship	37	0	4	0	1	0	1	0	43	0
Southampton	2026–27	Championship	9	1	0	0	2	0	—		11	1
Southampton	Total		46	1	4	0	3	0	1	0	54	1
Career total			169	9	9	1	8	0	5	0	191	10

== Honours ==
West Bromwich Albion U23

- Premier League Cup winner: 2021–22

England U21

- UEFA European Under-21 Championship: 2025

Individual

- West Bromwich Albion Young Player of the Year: 2023–24, 2024–25
