= Shilen Patel =

American businessman

- Born: Tampa, Florida, U.S.
- Education: Babson College (BSBA); Columbia University (MBA); London Business School (MBA)
- Known for: Owner, West Bromwich Albion (2024–present); Founder, HealthAxis Group

Shilen Patel is an American businessman, entrepreneur and investor. He is the majority shareholder and chairman of English association football club West Bromwich Albion.

== Career ==
Patel was born in Tampa, and still resides in Florida. He received a Bachelor's degree in Business Administration from Babson College in 2002, and an MBA from Columbia University and London Business School in 2013. Patel sold his first company, Visionary HealthWare, in 2011.

He is the founder and CEO of HealthAxis Group, a healthcare software company based in Tampa.

Patel is active in the running of the Drs. Kiran and Pallavi Patel Family Office portfolio. He is co-founder and Chairman of the TiE Tampa Bay Angel Fund; in 2019, he chaired the Community Empowerment Lab, a non-profit focused on entrepreneurship and community building. In 2021, he became a trustee of the University of South Florida.

== West Bromwich Albion ==
In February 2024, Patel completed the takeover of West Bromwich Albion from a Chinese business group headed by Guochuan Lai, acquiring an 87.8% shareholding in the club via his company Bilkul Football WBA, owned by Patel and his father Kiran C Patel. The acquisition made him the first Indian American to own a football club in the English football league system.

Patel also owns a minority shareholding in Italian Serie A club Bologna, which he has held since 2014.

== Personal life ==
Patel is the son of Dr Kiran C Patel, a Zambian-born, Florida based businessman and entrepreneur; and Dr Pallavi Patel.
