= Kiran C. Patel =

Cardiologist and businessman (born 1949)

Kiran C Patel
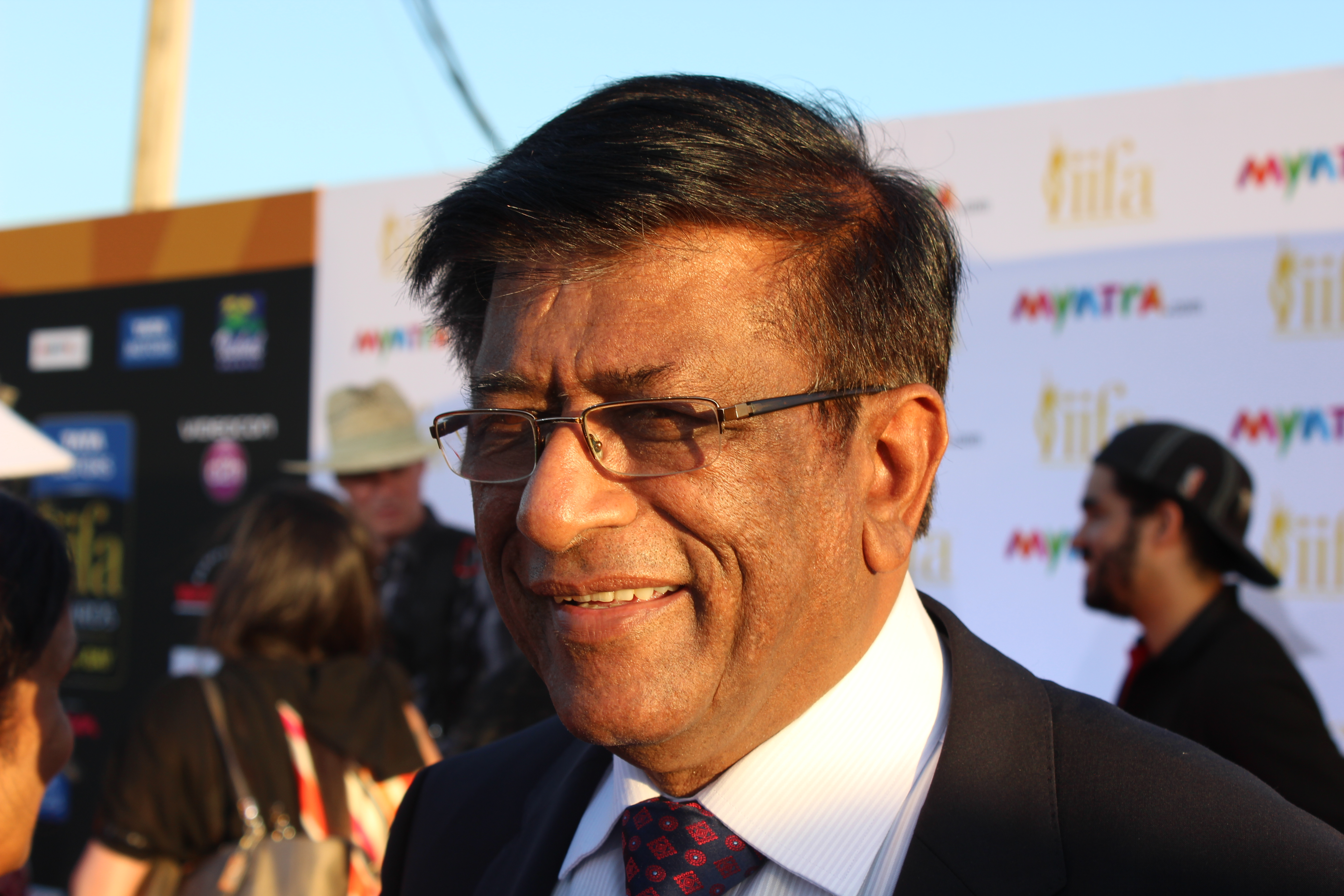
- Patel at IIFA (2014)
- Born: 1949 (age 76–77); Northern Rhodesia
- Other name: Dr. K
- Citizenship: American
- Occupations: Cardiologist, businessman
- Spouse: Pallavi Patel
- Children: 3
- Father: Chhotubhai Patel

Kiran C. Patel (born 1949) is a Zambian-born Indian American philanthropist, serial entrepreneur, hotelier and cardiologist.

== Early life and education ==
Patel was born in Zambia in 1949 to a Hindu Gujarati Indian family. He got his primary education under the British educational system in Zambia and earned diplomas from Cambridge University and the University of London. Patel attended medical school in India at Smt NHL Municipal Medical College, Gujarat University and completed his internship in Africa. In 1976, he moved to the United States. Patel did his residency in internal medicine in New Jersey in 1980, and completed a fellowship in the cardiology program affiliated with Columbia University of New York in 1982.

== Career ==
After moving to Tampa, Florida in 1982, Patel began his practice as a cardiologist. In 1985, he started a physicians practice ownership and management company, which quickly expanded to 14 practices including family medicine, internal medicine, pediatrics and cardiology. In 1992, Patel became chairman of the board of Well Care HMO, INC. which under his leadership became this 5th largest Medicaid HMO in the United States. In 1999, he acquired 55% of Kingston N.Y.-based WellCare Management Group Inc, which managed two HMO's in Connecticut and New York. In 2002, he sold majority share in the WellCare Management Group, at which point WellCare Management was providing services to over 400,000 members. In 2007, Patel started a new insurance holding company called America's 1st Choice Holdings of Florida and acquired two Tampa Bay based Medicare Advantage Health Plans, Freedom Health and Optimum Health. He grew these companies to over 115,000 members and over $1 billion in revenue, at which point he sold to Anthem in April 2019.

In 2018, Patel invested $60 million in the medical device company Concept Medical. He committed to gift $50 million and an additional $150 million towards real estate and facility expansion in the medical education complex that will be part of NSU’s Tampa Bay Regional Campus, in Clearwater.

== Medical insurance ==
In 1992, Patel bought Well Care HMO, Inc. (Well Care) for approximately $5 million. He sold the company a decade later in 2002 for $200 million.

In 2007, he purchased Freedom Health and Optimum Healthcare Inc.

In 2017, he sold his second insurance company — America’s 1st Choice (including Freedom Health and Optimum Healthcare) to Anthem Inc. for an undisclosed amount.

== Freedom Health lawsuit ==
On 17 August 2009, a whistleblower filed a complaint with the district court in Tampa, alleging that Freedom was manipulating enrollment rolls. Patel and his brother Rupesh Shah were among the named defendants. The complaint also alleged that Freedom was engaging in service-area-expansion fraud — misrepresenting the number of health-care providers in its network in certain counties so that it could expand the areas in which it offered Medicare Advantage. Once the investigation was announced, Patel told employees "not to destroy documents or other evidence" in an emergency meeting.

New Yorker article further reports, "In 2016, seven years after Darren Sewell filed his case, the Justice Department informed Inman that it would join the suit. In May 2017, after months of difficult negotiations, Freedom settled charges that it had violated the False Claims Act and agreed to pay $31.7 million. Freedom's former chief operating officer, Sidd Pagidipati, paid seven hundred and fifty thousand dollars to settle charges related to his role in the alleged service-area-expansion fraud. Neither admitted liability.

== Awards and recognition ==
In 2019, Patel was given the Pravasi Bharatiya Samman by the government of India. In January 2019, the Clearwater City Council issued a resolution to rename Damascus Road as Dr. Kiran C. Patel Boulevard in recognition of Patel's contribution to Nova Southeastern University's Tampa Bay Regional Campus.

== Charity history ==
Patel has supported multiple groups through charitable donations:

1. Patel Foundation committed for $225 million to Nova Southeastern University's colleges of osteopathic and allopathic medicine.
2. $30.5 million to the University of South Florida for the Patel Center for Global Solutions and College of Global Sustainability.
3. $171,500 to build two homes for Habitat for Humanity.
4. Patel pledged $7.5 million donation to Florida Hospital Carrollwood from 2017–2018.

== Namesake institutes ==
- Kiran C. Patel College of Osteopathic Medicine (D.O)
- Kiran C. Patel College of Allopathic Medicine (M.D)
- Drs. Kiran and Pallavi Patel Allied Health Building
- Dr. Kiran C. Patel Center for Global Solutions
- Kiran C. Patel High School
- Kiran C. Patel Research Institute
- Patel Conservatory – Straz Center for the Performing Arts
- Dr. Kiran C Patel Centre for Sustainable Development, IIT Gandhinagar, Gujarat
- KCMRI, Bharuch, Gujarat

== Personal life ==
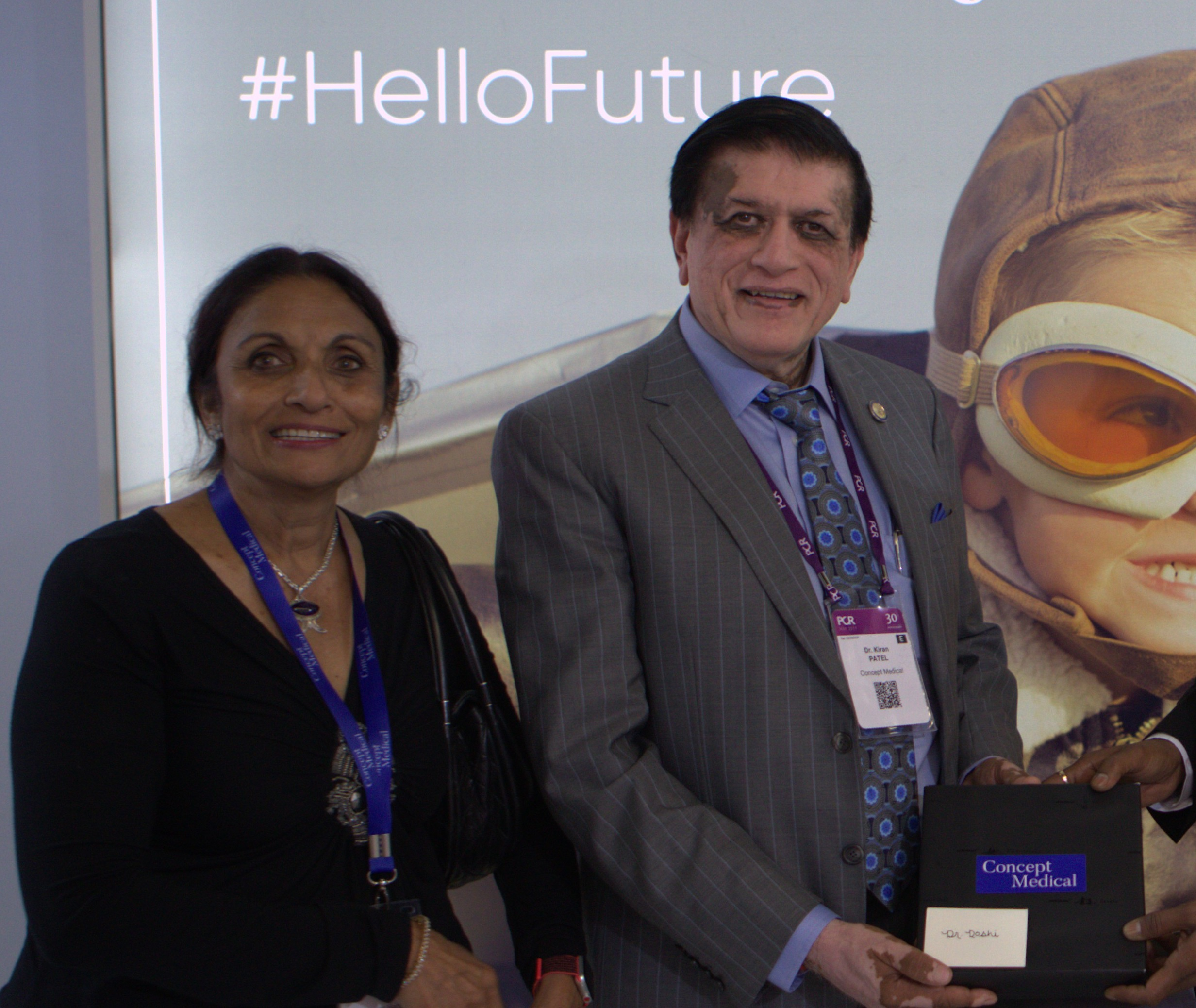
Kiran Patel and his wife Pallavi Patel at Euro PCR 2019

Patel is married to pediatrician Pallavi Patel. They have two daughters and one son, Shilen Patel with whom he jointly purchased English football (soccer) club West Bromwich Albion. Shilen now serves as Chairman of the club.

Patel developed vitiligo in 2002. He is not seeking treatment for the condition.
