= 2020–21 West Bromwich Albion F.C. season =

West Bromwich Albion
2020–21 season
- Owner: Lai Guochuan
- Head Coach: Slaven Bilić (until 16 December); Sam Allardyce (from 16 December)
- Stadium: The Hawthorns
- Premier League: 19th (relegated)
- FA Cup: Third round
- EFL Cup: Third round
- Top goalscorer: League: Matheus Pereira (11); All: Matheus Pereira (12)
Home colours	Away colours	Third colours

The 2020–21 season was the 143rd year in existence of West Bromwich Albion and their first season back in the Premier League after a two-year absence, following promotion from the Championship in the previous season. They also participated in the FA Cup and the EFL Cup.

On 16 December 2020, Albion parted company with head coach Slaven Bilić, after winning one of the first 13 league games. Sam Allardyce was confirmed as his successor later that day, with the former England manager taking charge of his eighth Premier League club, a competition record.

West Brom were relegated back to the Championship, after just one season in the Premier League, following an away defeat to Arsenal on 9 May 2021. This equalled Norwich City's record of five Premier League relegations and was the first time that a team managed by Sam Allardyce had been relegated from the top flight.

== Background ==
Prior to the start of the season, sports journalists were pessimistic about West Bromwich Albion's chances of surviving relegation. Phil McNulty, the BBC's chief football writer, thought that Albion would finish in 19th place, while Henry Winter of The Times also forecast relegation. The Guardian predicted a 20th-place finish, while identifying Matheus Pereira as Albion's key player.

Restrictions stemming from the COVID-19 pandemic in the United Kingdom created uncertainty surrounding the reintroduction of supporters to football stadia. As a result, the club did not issue full season tickets in 2020–21.

Albion unveiled three new kits for the season, designed in tribute to the "barcode" design worn by the club's promotion winning team of 1992–93. The home kit featured navy blue and white striped shirts, white shorts and navy blue socks, while the away colours comprised green and yellow striped shirts, green shorts and yellow socks. The third kit was made up of red and yellow stripes, red shorts and yellow socks. The kits were manufactured by Puma and were sponsored by Ideal Boilers. Alongside all other Premier League clubs, West Bromwich Albion's players wore a "No Room For Racism" badge on their shirts; this replaced the "Black Lives Matter" badges worn at the end of the previous Premier League season.

== First-team squad ==
As of 26 January 2021

Note: Flags indicate national team as has been defined under FIFA eligibility rules. Players may hold more than one non-FIFA nationality.

No.	Name	Nat.	Position(s)	Date of birth (age)	Apps.	Goals	Year signed	Signed from	Transfer fee
Goalkeepers
1	Sam Johnstone	(England)	GK	25 February 1993 (age 33)	113	0	2018	(England) Manchester United	£6,500,000
25	David Button	(England)	GK	27 February 1989 (age 37)	4	0	2020	(England) Brighton & Hove Albion	Undisclosed
31	Andy Lonergan	(England)	GK	19 October 1983 (age 42)	0	0	2021	(England) Stoke City	Free
Defenders
2	Darnell Furlong	(England) (Montserrat)	RB/CB	31 October 1995 (age 30)	53	3	2019	(England) Queens Park Rangers	£1,500,000
3	Kieran Gibbs	(England)	LB/LM	26 September 1989 (age 37)	99	5	2017	(England) Arsenal	£7,000,000
5	Kyle Bartley	(England) (Jamaica)	CB	22 May 1991 (age 35)	87	5	2018	(Wales) Swansea City	£4,000,000
6	Semi Ajayi	(Nigeria) (England)	CB/DM	9 November 1993 (age 32)	65	7	2019	(England) Rotherham United	£1,500,000
14	Conor Townsend	(England)	LB/LM	4 March 1993 (age 33)	58	1	2018	(England) Scunthorpe United	£750,000
20	Branislav Ivanović	(Serbia)	CB/RB	22 February 1984 (age 42)	13	0	2020	(Russia) Zenit Saint Petersburg	Free
22	Lee Peltier	(England) (Antigua and Barbuda)	RB/CB/DM	11 December 1986 (age 39)	5	0	2020	(Wales) Cardiff City	Free
24	Cédric Kipré	(Ivory Coast) (France)	CB	9 December 1996 (age 29)	3	0	2020	(England) Wigan Athletic	£990,000
26	Ahmed Hegazi	(Egypt)	CB	25 January 1991 (age 35)	104	4	2017	(Egypt) Al Ahly	Undisclosed
27	Dara O'Shea	(Republic of Ireland)	CB/RB	4 March 1999 (age 27)	39	3	2017	Academy	Trainee
Midfielders
8	Jake Livermore	(England)	DM/CM/CB	14 November 1989 (age 36)	152	7	2017	(England) Hull City	£10,000,000
10	Matt Phillips	(Scotland) (England)	RW/AM/LW	13 March 1991 (age 35)	154	21	2016	(England) Queens Park Rangers	£5,500,000
11	Grady Diangana	(England) (Democratic Republic of the Congo)	LW/RW/AM	19 April 1998 (age 28)	47	9	2020	(England) West Ham United	£18,000,000
13	Kamil Grosicki	(Poland)	LW/RW	8 June 1988 (age 38)	19	1	2020	(England) Hull City	Undisclosed
16	Rekeem Harper	(England) (Jamaica)	CM/AM/DM	8 March 2000 (age 26)	40	2	2016	Academy	Trainee
18	Conor Gallagher	(England)	CM/DM/AM	6 February 2000 (age 26)	16	2	2020	(England) Chelsea	Loan
19	Romaine Sawyers	(Saint Kitts and Nevis) (England)	AM/CM	2 November 1991 (age 34)	63	1	2019	(England) Brentford	Undisclosed
21	Kyle Edwards	(England)	LM/CM/RM	17 February 1998 (age 28)	49	4	2015	Academy	Trainee
23	Robert Snodgrass	(Scotland)	RW/LW/AM	7 September 1987 (age 39)	2	0	2021	(England) West Ham United	Undisclosed
28	Sam Field	(England)	CM/DM/LM	8 May 1998 (age 28)	45	2	2015	Academy	Trainee
30	Ainsley Maitland-Niles	(England)	DM	29 August 1997 (age 28)	0	0	2021	(England) Arsenal F.C.	Loan
35	Okay Yokuşlu	(Turkey)	DM	9 March 1994 (age 31)	0	0	2021	(Spain) RC Celta de Vigo	Loan
Forwards
4	Hal Robson-Kanu	(Wales) (England)	CF/LW/RW	21 May 1989 (age 37)	143	22	2016	(England) Reading	Free
7	Callum Robinson	(Republic of Ireland) (England)	CF/LW/RW	2 February 1995 (age 31)	36	6	2020	(England) Sheffield United	Undisclosed
9	Kenneth Zohore	(Denmark) (Ivory Coast)	CF/SS	31 January 1994 (age 32)	20	5	2019	(Wales) Cardiff City	£8,000,000
12	Matheus Pereira	(Brazil) (Portugal)	RW/LW/AM	5 May 1996 (age 30)	60	13	2020	(Portugal) Sporting CP	£8,000,000
15	Charlie Austin	(England)	CF	5 July 1989 (age 37)	45	10	2019	(England) Southampton	£4,000,000
17	Mbaye Diagne	(Senegal)	CF	28 October 1991 (age 34)	1	0	2021	(Turkey) Galatasaray	Loan
29	Karlan Grant	(England)	CF/LW/RW	18 September 1997 (age 29)	13	1	2020	(England) Huddersfield Town	£15,000,000

== Transfers ==
=== Transfers in ===
Date	Position	Nationality	Name	From	Fee	Ref.
17 August 2020	AM	(Brazil)	Matheus Pereira	(Portugal) Sporting CP	Undisclosed	
4 September 2020	RW	(England)	Grady Diangana	(England) West Ham United	Undisclosed	
4 September 2020	CB	(Ivory Coast)	Cédric Kipré	(England) Wigan Athletic	Undisclosed	
5 September 2020	GK	(England)	David Button	(England) Brighton & Hove Albion	Undisclosed	
9 September 2020	LW	(Republic of Ireland)	Callum Robinson	(England) Sheffield United	Undisclosed	
15 September 2020	CB	(Serbia)	Branislav Ivanović	(Russia) Zenit Saint Petersburg	Free transfer	
15 October 2020	CF	(England)	Karlan Grant	(England) Huddersfield Town	Undisclosed	
8 January 2021	RW	(Scotland)	Robert Snodgrass	(England) West Ham United	Undisclosed	
9 January 2021	GK	(England)	Andy Lonergan	(England) Stoke City	Free transfer	

=== Loans in ===
Date from	Position	Nationality	Name	From	Date until	Ref.
17 September 2020	CM	(England)	Conor Gallagher	(England) Chelsea	End of season	
29 September 2020	AM	(Croatia)	Filip Krovinović	(Portugal) Benfica	End of season	
29 January 2021	CF	(Senegal)	Mbaye Diagne	(Turkey) Galatasaray	End of season	
1 February 2021	DM	(Turkey)	Okay Yokuşlu	(Spain) Celta Vigo	End of season	
1 February 2021	CM	(England)	Ainsley Maitland-Niles	Arsenal F.C.	End of Season	

=== Loans out ===
Date from	Position	Nationality	Name	To	Date until	Ref.
1 August 2020	AM	(England)	Finn Azaz	(England) Cheltenham Town	End of season	
13 August 2020	GK	(England)	Josh Griffiths	(England) Cheltenham Town	End of season	
4 September 2020	CF	(England)	Callum Morton	(England) Lincoln City	End of season	
4 September 2020	GK	(England)	Alex Palmer	(England) Lincoln City	End of season	
10 September 2020	LW	(England)	Nick Clayton-Phillips	(England) Solihull Moors	End of season	
11 September 2020	SS	(England)	Rayhaan Tulloch	(England) Doncaster Rovers	End of season	
2 October 2020	CB	(England)	Saul Shotton	(England) Woking	1 January 2021	
6 October 2020	CF	(England)	Jamie Soule	(England) Lincoln City	1 January 2021	
8 October 2020	CF	(England)	Owen Windsor	(England) Grimsby Town	20 December 2020	
16 October 2020	CF	(Denmark)	Kenneth Zohore	(England) Millwall	End of season	
26 October 2020	CB	(Egypt)	Ahmed Hegazi	(Saudi Arabia) Al-Ittihad	End of season	
5 January 2021	CF	(England)	Owen Windsor	(Wales) Newport County	1 February 2021	
9 January 2021	CF	(England)	Charlie Austin	(England) Queens Park Rangers	End of season	
21 January 2021	CM	(England)	Rekeem Harper	(England) Birmingham City	End of season	
1 February 2021	CM	(England)	Sam Field	(England) Queens Park Rangers F.C.	End of Season with view to permanent transfer	
1 February 2021	CB	(Ivory Coast)	Cédric Kipré	(Belgium) R. Charleroi S.C.	End of Season	

=== Transfers out ===
Date	Position	Nationality	Name	To	Fee	Ref.
1 July 2020	GK	(Oman)	Ali Al-Habsi	Retired		
1 July 2020	CM	(Australia)	Eoin Ashton	(Australia) Heidelberg United	Released	
1 July 2020	RW	(England)	Stanley Asomugha	Unattached	Released	
1 July 2020	CM	(Northern Ireland)	Jack Chambers	(England) Luton Town	Released	
1 July 2020	CB	(England)	Nathan Ferguson	(England) Crystal Palace	Released	
1 July 2020	CB	(England)	Jack Fitzwater	(Scotland) Livingston	Released	
1 July 2020	CB	(Republic of Ireland)	Kevin Healy	(Northern Ireland) Portadown	Released	
1 July 2020	CB	(England)	Carrick Hill	(England) Alvechurch	Released	
1 July 2020	GK	(England)	Brad House	(England) Horsham	Released	
1 July 2020	CB	(Wales)	Pablo Martinez	(England) Bristol Rovers	Released	
1 July 2020	RB	(Scotland)	Dan Meredith	(England) Leamington	Released	
1 July 2020	RW	(England)	Yusuff Ojebode	IW Cardinals (Uni. of the Incarnate Word)	Released	
1 July 2020	CM	(England)	Lewis Smith	(England) Alvechurch	Released	
1 July 2020	DM	(England)	Peter Taylor	(England) Alvechurch	Released	
1 July 2020	CF	(England)	Jacob Wakeling	(England) Alvechurch	Released	
1 July 2020	DM	(England)	Sam Wilding	(England) Sunderland	Released	
1 July 2020	RB	(England)	Remari Williams	Unattached	Released	
1 July 2020	RB	(England)	Kane Wilson	(England) Forest Green Rovers	Released	
1 August 2020	LW	(Northern Ireland)	Chris Brunt	(England) Bristol City	Released	
27 August 2020	DM	(England)	Gareth Barry	Retired		
28 August 2020	RW	(England)	Jonathan Leko	(England) Birmingham City	£1,000,000	
9 September 2020	RW	(Scotland)	Oliver Burke	(England) Sheffield United	Undisclosed	
11 September 2020	FW	(England)	Shilo Waldo	(England) Stoke City	Free transfer	
25 September 2020	LW	(Republic of Ireland)	Alex Gilbert	(England) Brentford	Free transfer	
14 January 2021	GK	(England)	Jonathan Bond	(United States) LA Galaxy	Undisclosed	

== Friendly matches ==
5 September 2020 Friendly	Brighton & Hove Albion	0–0	West Bromwich Albion	Falmer
14:00 BST		Report		Stadium: Amex; Attendance: 0

== Competitions ==
=== Premier League ===
Following their promotion from the 2019–20 EFL Championship, West Bromwich Albion are competing in the 2020–21 Premier League, the 29th season of English football's top division since its breakaway from the Football League in 1992. It is Albion's 13th season in the Premier League, 81st season in the top division of English football and their 122nd season of league football in all.

Albion defeated Chelsea 5–2 in April in what was their first victory at Stamford Bridge since 1978.

==== League table ====
Pos	Team	Pld	W	D	L	GF	GA	GD	Pts	Qualification or relegation
16	Brighton & Hove Albion	38	9	14	15	40	46	−6	41	
17	Burnley	38	10	9	19	33	55	−22	39	
18	Fulham (R)	38	5	13	20	27	53	−26	28	Relegation to EFL Championship
19	West Bromwich Albion (R)	38	5	11	22	35	76	−41	26	Relegation to EFL Championship
20	Sheffield United (R)	38	7	2	29	20	63	−43	23	Relegation to EFL Championship

Source: Premier League
Rules for classification: 1) Points; 2) Goal difference; 3) Goals scored; 4) If the champions, relegated teams or qualified teams for UEFA competitions cannot be determined by rules 1 to 3, rules 4.1 to 4.3 are applied – 4.1) Points gained in head-to-head record between such teams; 4.2) Away goals scored in head-to-head record between such teams; 4.3) Play-offs
(R) Relegated

==== Results summary ====
Overall								Home						Away					
Pld	W	D	L	GF	GA	GD	Pts	W	D	L	GF	GA	GD	W	D	L	GF	GA	GD
38	5	11	22	35	76	−41	26	3	6	10	15	39	−24	2	5	12	20	37	−17

Last updated: 23 May 2021.

==== Results by matchday ====
Matchday	1	2	3	4	5	6	7	8	9	10	11	12	13	14	15	16	17	18	19	20	21	22	23	24	25	26	27	28	29	30	31	32	33	34	35	36	37	38
Ground	H	A	H	A	H	A	A	H	A	H	H	A	A	H	A	H	H	A	A	H	H	A	A	H	A	H	H	H	A	A	H	A	A	H	A	H	H	A
Result	L	L	D	L	D	D	L	L	L	W	L	L	D	L	D	L	L	W	L	L	D	L	L	D	D	W	L	D	L	W	W	L	D	D	L	L	L	L
Position	20	20	17	17	17	17	18	18	19	18	19	19	19	19	19	19	19	19	19	19	19	19	19	19	19	19	19	19	19	19	19	19	19	19	19	19	19	19

Updated to match(es) played on 23 May 2021. Source:
A = Away; H = Home; W = Win; D = Draw; L = Loss

==== Matches ====
The 2020–21 season fixtures were released on 20 August.

13 September 2020 1	West Bromwich Albion	0–3	Leicester City	West Bromwich
14:00 BST	Ajayi (yellow card) 63'	Report	Justin (yellow card) 16'; Castagne 56'; Vardy 74' (pen.), 84' (pen.)	Stadium: The Hawthorns; Attendance: 0 Referee: Anthony Taylor

19 September 2020 2	Everton	5–2	West Bromwich Albion	Walton, Liverpool
12:30 BST	Doucouré (yellow card) 16'; Calvert-Lewin 31', 62', 66'; Rodríguez 45'; Keane 54'	Report	Diangana 10'; Gibbs (red card) 45+1'; Pereira 47'	Stadium: Goodison Park; Attendance: 0 Referee: Mike Dean

26 September 2020 3	West Bromwich Albion	3–3	Chelsea	West Bromwich
17:30 BST	Robinson 4', 25'; Bartley 27'; Furlong (yellow card) 82'	Report	Alonso (yellow card) 8'; James (yellow card) 27'; Mount 54'; Hudson-Odoi 70'; Christensen (yellow card) 86'; Abraham 90+3'	Stadium: The Hawthorns; Attendance: 0 Referee: Jonathan Moss

4 October 2020 4	Southampton	2–0	West Bromwich Albion	Southampton
12:00 BST	Djenepo 41', (yellow card) 50'; Walker-Peters (yellow card) 53'; Romeu 69'	Report	Livermore (yellow card) 26'	Stadium: St Mary's Stadium; Attendance: 0 Referee: Chris Kavanagh

19 October 2020 5	West Bromwich Albion	0–0	Burnley	West Bromwich
17:30 BST	Livermore (yellow card) 53'; Phillips (yellow card) 90+2'	Report	Taylor (yellow card) 37'; Westwood (yellow card) 77'	Stadium: The Hawthorns; Attendance: 0 Referee: Anthony Taylor

26 October 2020 6	Brighton & Hove Albion	1–1	West Bromwich Albion	Falmer
17:30 GMT	Livermore 40' (o.g.); Lamptey (yellow card) 42'; Webster (yellow card) 77'	Report	Grant 83'	Stadium: Falmer Stadium; Attendance: 0 Referee: Jonathan Moss

2 November 2020 7	Fulham	2–0	West Bromwich Albion	Fulham
17:30 GMT	Reid 26', (yellow card) 55'; Aina 30'; Lookman (yellow card) 57'; Reed (yellow card) 83'	Report	Gallagher (yellow card) 47'; Sawyers (yellow card) 69'	Stadium: Craven Cottage; Attendance: 0 Referee: Simon Hooper

8 November 2020 8	West Bromwich Albion	0–1	Tottenham Hotspur	West Bromwich
12:00 GMT	Bartley (yellow card) 44'	Report	Kane 88'	Stadium: The Hawthorns; Attendance: 0 Referee: Andrew Madley

21 November 2020 9	Manchester United	1–0	West Bromwich Albion	Manchester
20:00 GMT	Fernandes 56' (pen.); Cavani (yellow card) 90+1'	Report	Gallagher (yellow card) 76'	Stadium: Old Trafford; Attendance: 0 Referee: David Coote

28 November 2020 10	West Bromwich Albion	1–0	Sheffield United	West Bromwich
20:00 GMT	Ivanović (yellow card) 2'; Gallagher 13'; Pereira (yellow card) 86'	Report	Norwood (yellow card) 10'; Berge (yellow card) 18'; Egan (yellow card) 58'	Stadium: The Hawthorns; Attendance: 0 Referee: Mike Dean

6 December 2020 11	West Bromwich Albion	1–5	Crystal Palace	West Bromwich
12:00 GMT	Sawyers (yellow card) 17'; Gallagher 30', (yellow card) 58'; Pereira (red card) 34'	Report	Furlong 8' (o.g.); McArthur (yellow card) 50'; Zaha 55', 68'; Benteke 59', 82'; Milivojević (yellow card) 88'	Stadium: The Hawthorns; Attendance: 0 Referee: Paul Tierney

12 December 2020 12	Newcastle United	2–1	West Bromwich Albion	Newcastle upon Tyne
15:00 GMT	Almirón 1'; Lewis (yellow card) 35'; Gayle 82'; Wilson (yellow card) 90+5'	Report	Furlong (yellow card) 35', (goal) 50'; Ajayi (yellow card) 69'; Ivanović (yellow card) 88'	Stadium: St James' Park; Attendance: 0 Referee: Darren England

15 December 2020 13	Manchester City	1–1	West Bromwich Albion	Manchester
20:00 GMT	Gündoğan 30'; Cancelo (yellow card) 45+2'; Aké (yellow card) 90+4'	Report	Gallagher (yellow card) 40'; Dias 43' (o.g.); Peltier (yellow card) 90'; Sawyers (yellow card) 90+2'	Stadium: City of Manchester Stadium; Attendance: 0 Referee: Peter Bankes

20 December 2020 14	West Bromwich Albion	0–3	Aston Villa	West Bromwich
19:15 GMT	Livermore (red card) 36'; Grant (yellow card) 62'	Report	El Ghazi 5', 88' (pen.); Hause (yellow card) 40'; Mings (yellow card) 66'; Traoré 84'	Stadium: The Hawthorns; Attendance: 0 Referee: Martin Atkinson

27 December 2020 15	Liverpool	1–1	West Bromwich Albion	Liverpool
16:30 GMT	Mané 12'	Report	O'Shea (yellow card) 56'; Ajayi 82'	Stadium: Anfield; Attendance: 2,000; Referee: Kevin Friend

29 December 2020 16	West Bromwich Albion	0–5	Leeds United	West Bromwich
18:00 GMT		Report	Sawyers 9' (o.g.); Alioski 31', (yellow card) 41'; Harrison 36'; Rodrigo 40'; Raphinha 72'	Stadium: The Hawthorns; Attendance: 0 Referee: Lee Mason

2 January 2021 17	West Bromwich Albion	0–4	Arsenal	West Bromwich
20:00 GMT	Gallagher (yellow card) 70'	Report	Tierney 23'; Saka 28'; Bellerín (yellow card) 41'; Lacazette 61', 64'; Ceballos (yellow card) 87'	Stadium: The Hawthorns; Attendance: 0 Referee: Martin Atkinson

16 January 2021 18	Wolverhampton Wanderers	2–3	West Bromwich Albion	Wolverhampton
12:30 GMT	Silva 38', (yellow card) 90'; Boly 43'; Dendoncker (yellow card) 73'	Report	Pereira 8' (pen.), 56' (pen.); Ajayi (yellow card) 36', (goal) 52'	Stadium: Molineux Stadium; Attendance: 0 Referee: Michael Oliver

19 January 2021 19	West Ham United	2–1	West Bromwich Albion	Stratford, London
18:00 GMT	Bowen 45+1'; Antonio 66'	Report	Pereira 51'; Gallagher (yellow card) 90+3'	Stadium: London Stadium; Attendance: 0 Referee: Graham Scott

26 January 2021 20	West Bromwich Albion	0–5	Manchester City	West Bromwich
20:15 GMT	Robson-Kanu (yellow card) 84'; O'Shea (yellow card) 90+2'	Report	Gündoğan 6', 30'; Cancelo 20'; Mahrez 45+2'; Sterling 57'	Stadium: The Hawthorns; Attendance: 0 Referee: Chris Kavanagh

30 January 2021 21	West Bromwich Albion	2–2	Fulham	West Bromwich
15:00 GMT	Bartley 47', (yellow card) 75'; Pereira 66'	Report	Reid 10'; Cavaleiro 77'	Stadium: The Hawthorns; Attendance: 0 Referee: Anthony Taylor

2 February 2021 22	Sheffield United	2–1	West Bromwich Albion	Sheffield
18:00 GMT	Bogle 56'; Sharp 73'; Fleck (yellow card) 83'; McGoldrick (yellow card) 84'	Report	Phillips 41'; Pereira (yellow card) 90+4'	Stadium: Bramall Lane; Attendance: 0 Referee: Paul Tierney

7 February 2021 23	Tottenham Hotspur	2–0	West Bromwich Albion	Tottenham
12:00 GMT	Kane 54'; Son Heung-min 58'; Lamela (yellow card) 64'	Report	Snodgrass (yellow card) 77'; Gallagher (yellow card) 90+3'	Stadium: Tottenham Hotspur Stadium; Attendance: 0 Referee: Stuart Attwell

14 February 2021 24	West Bromwich Albion	1–1	Manchester United	West Bromwich
14:00 GMT	Diagne 2', (yellow card) 89'; Gallagher (yellow card) 37'; Bartley (yellow card) 61'; Livermore (yellow card) 79'; Snodgrass (yellow card) 85'	Report	Fernandes 44'	Stadium: The Hawthorns; Attendance: 0 Referee: Craig Pawson

20 February 2021 25	Burnley	0–0	West Bromwich Albion	Burnley
15:00 GMT	Cork (yellow card) 76'; Mee (yellow card) 90+3'; Lowton (yellow card) 90+4'	Report	Ajayi (red card) 30'	Stadium: Turf Moor; Attendance: 0 Referee: Mike Dean

27 February 2021 26	West Bromwich Albion	1–0	Brighton & Hove Albion	West Bromwich
15:00 GMT	Bartley 11'	Report	Groß (penalty missed) 19'; Welbeck (penalty missed) 74'	Stadium: The Hawthorns; Attendance: 0 Referee: Lee Mason

4 March 2021 27	West Bromwich Albion	0–1	Everton	West Bromwich
18:00 GMT	O'Shea (yellow card) 60'; Furlong (yellow card) 68'; Yokuşlu (yellow card) 82'	Report	Holgate (yellow card) 37'; Richarlison 65'	Stadium: The Hawthorns; Attendance: 0 Referee: Darren England

7 March 2021 28	West Bromwich Albion	0–0	Newcastle United	West Bromwich
12:00 GMT		Report		Stadium: The Hawthorns; Attendance: 0 Referee: Martin Atkinson

13 March 2021 29	Crystal Palace	1–0	West Bromwich Albion	Selhurst
15:00 GMT	Milivojević 37' (pen.); Eze (yellow card) 53'; Van Aanholt (yellow card) 90+1'; Cahill (yellow card) 90+3'	Report	Furlong (yellow card) 36'	Stadium: Selhurst Park; Attendance: 0 Referee: Simon Hooper

3 April 2021 30	Chelsea	2–5	West Bromwich Albion	London
12:30 BST	Thiago Silva (yellow card) 5' (yellow-red card) 29'; Pulisic 27'; Kovačić (yellow card) 66'; Mount 71'	Report	Diagne (yellow card) 14', (goal) 68'; Pereira 45+2', 45+4'; Robinson 63', 90+1'	Stadium: Stamford Bridge; Attendance: 0 Referee: David Coote

12 April 2021 31	West Bromwich Albion	3–0	Southampton	West Bromwich
18:00 BST	Pereira 32' (pen.); Phillips 35'; Robinson 69'	Report	Ward-Prowse (yellow card) 37', (penalty missed) 90+3'	Stadium: The Hawthorns; Attendance: 0 Referee: Simon Hooper

22 April 2021 32	Leicester City	3–0	West Bromwich Albion	Leicester
20:00 BST	Vardy 23'; Evans 26'; Iheanacho 36'	Report	Yokuşlu (yellow card) 57'; Bartley (yellow card) 79'	Stadium: King Power Stadium; Attendance: 0 Referee: Andrew Madley

25 April 2021 33	Aston Villa	2–2	West Bromwich Albion	Aston
19:00 BST	El Ghazi 9' (pen.); Davis 90+2'	Report	Pereira 23' (pen.); Mings 47' (o.g.); Gallagher (yellow card) 54'; Yokuşlu (yellow card) 77'	Stadium: Villa Park; Attendance: 0 Referee: Stuart Attwell

3 May 2021 34	West Bromwich Albion	1–1	Wolverhampton Wanderers	West Bromwich
18:00 BST	Diagne 62'; Maitland-Niles (yellow card) 69'; Furlong (yellow card) 88'	Report	Silva 45+2'	Stadium: The Hawthorns; Attendance: 0 Referee: Mike Dean

9 May 2021 35	Arsenal	3–1	West Bromwich Albion	Holloway
19:00 BST	Smith Rowe 29'; Pépé 35'; Ceballos (yellow card) 70'; Willian 90'	Report	Robson-Kanu (yellow card) 61'; Pereira 67'; Gallagher (yellow card) 76'	Stadium: Emirates Stadium; Attendance: 0 Referee: Peter Bankes

16 May 2021 36	West Bromwich Albion	1–2	Liverpool	West Bromwich
16:30 BST	Robson-Kanu 15'	Report	Salah 33'; Alisson 90+5'	Stadium: The Hawthorns; Attendance: 0 Referee: Mike Dean

19 May 2021 37	West Bromwich Albion	1–3	West Ham United	West Bromwich
20:15 BST	Johnstone (yellow card) 1'; Pereira 27'; Yokuşlu (yellow card) 40'	Report	Rice (penalty missed) 3'; Ogbonna (yellow card) 34', (goal) 82'; Souček 45+1'; Dawson (yellow card) 87'; Antonio 88'	Stadium: The Hawthorns; Attendance: 5,371; Referee: Michael Oliver

23 May 2021 38	Leeds United	3–1	West Bromwich Albion	Leeds
16:00 BST	Cooper (yellow card) 1'; Rodrigo 17'; Phillips 42', (yellow card) 90+4'; Bamford 79' (pen.)	Report	Gallagher (yellow card) 23'; Robson-Kanu 90'	Stadium: Elland Road; Attendance: 10,000; Referee: David Coote

=== FA Cup ===
The third round draw was made on 30 November, with Premier League and EFL Championship clubs all entering the competition.

9 January 2021 Third round	Blackpool	2–2 (a.e.t.) (3–2 p)	West Bromwich Albion	Blackpool
15:00 GMT	Ballard (yellow card) 38'; Yates 41'; Madine 66'	Report	Ajayi (yellow card) 16', (goal) 52'; Gallagher (yellow card) 47'; Pereira 80' (pen.)	Stadium: Bloomfield Road; Attendance: 0 Referee: John Brooks
	Penalties
	Yates (penalty missed); Dougall (penalty scored); Husband (penalty scored); Madine (penalty scored); Kaikai (penalty missed)		(penalty scored) Grosicki; (penalty missed) Edwards; (penalty missed) Furlong; (penalty scored) Livermore; (penalty missed) Pereira

=== EFL Cup ===
The draw for both the second and third round were confirmed on 6 September, live on Sky Sports by Phil Babb.

16 September 2020 Second round	West Bromwich Albion	3–0	Harrogate Town	West Bromwich
18:00 BST	Harper 18'; Robson-Kanu 22'; Field (yellow card) 45+2'; Robinson 77'	Report	Smith (yellow card) 59'	Stadium: The Hawthorns; Attendance: 0 Referee: Thomas Bramall

22 September 2020 Third round	West Bromwich Albion	2–2 (4–5 p)	Brentford	West Bromwich
19:00 BST	Robson-Kanu 56' (pen.), 66' (pen.); O'Shea (yellow card) 88'	Report	Marcondes 58'; Forss 73' (pen.)	Stadium: The Hawthorns; Attendance: 0 Referee: Darren England
	Penalties
	Austin (penalty scored); Gallagher (penalty scored); Edwards (penalty scored); Townsend (penalty scored); Diangana (penalty missed)		(penalty scored) Toney; (penalty scored) Dasilva; (penalty scored) Fosu; (penalty scored) Forss; (penalty scored) Nørgaard

== Statistics ==
As of 26 May 2021

No.	Pos	Nat	Player	Total		Premier League		FA Cup		League Cup	
No.	Pos	Nat	Player	Apps	Goals	Apps	Goals	Apps	Goals	Apps	Goals
1	GK	(England) ENG	Sam Johnstone	37	0	37	0	0	0	0	0
2	DF	(England) ENG	Darnell Furlong	36	1	35	1	1	0	0	0
3	DF	(England) ENG	Kieran Gibbs	12	0	11	0	1	0	0	0
4	FW	(Wales) WAL	Hal Robson-Kanu	21	5	19	2	0	0	2	3
5	DF	(England) ENG	Kyle Bartley	31	3	30	3	1	0	0	0
6	DF	(Nigeria) NGR	Semi Ajayi	34	3	33	2	1	1	0	0
7	FW	(Republic of Ireland) IRL	Callum Robinson	29	6	28	5	0	0	1	1
8	MF	(England) ENG	Jake Livermore	19	0	18	0	1	0	0	0
10	MF	(Scotland) SCO	Matt Phillips	35	2	33	2	0	0	2	0
11	MF	(England) ENG	Grady Diangana	21	1	20	1	0	0	1	0
12	FW	(Brazil) BRA	Matheus Pereira	34	12	33	11	1	1	0	0
13	MF	(Poland) POL	Kamil Grosicki	5	0	3	0	1	0	1	0
14	DF	(England) ENG	Conor Townsend	27	0	25	0	0	0	2	0
15	FW	(England) ENG	Charlie Austin	7	0	5	0	0	0	2	0
16	MF	(England) ENG	Rekeem Harper	4	1	2	0	0	0	2	1
17	FW	(Senegal) SEN	Mbaye Diagne	16	3	16	3	0	0	0	0
18	MF	(England) ENG	Conor Gallagher	32	2	30	2	1	0	1	0
19	MF	(Saint Kitts and Nevis) SKN	Romaine Sawyers	21	0	19	0	1	0	1	0
20	DF	(Serbia) SRB	Branislav Ivanović	15	0	13	0	1	0	1	0
21	MF	(England) ENG	Kyle Edwards	8	0	5	0	1	0	2	0
22	DF	(England) ENG	Lee Peltier	7	0	4	0	1	0	2	0
23	MF	(Scotland) SCO	Robert Snodgrass	8	0	8	0	0	0	0	0
24	DF	(Ivory Coast) CIV	Cédric Kipré	3	0	0	0	1	0	2	0
25	GK	(England) ENG	David Button	4	0	1	0	1	0	2	0
26	DF	(Egypt) EGY	Ahmed Hegazi	1	0	1	0	0	0	0	0
27	DF	(Republic of Ireland) IRL	Dara O'Shea	31	0	28	0	1	0	2	0
28	MF	(England) ENG	Sam Field	5	0	3	0	0	0	2	0
29	FW	(England) ENG	Karlan Grant	21	1	21	1	0	0	0	0
30	MF	(England) ENG	Ainsley Maitland-Niles	15	0	15	0	0	0	0	0
35	MF	(Turkey) TUR	Okay Yokuşlu	16	0	16	0	0	0	0	0
Players who left the club:
17	MF	(Croatia) CRO	Filip Krovinović	12	0	11	0	1	0	0	0

=== Goals record ===
As of 15 March 2022

Rank	No.	Nat.	Po.	Name	Premier League	FA Cup	League Cup	Total
1	12	(Brazil)	AM	Matheus Pereira	11	1	0	8
2	7	(Republic of Ireland)	LW	Callum Robinson	5	0	1	5
3	4	(Wales)	CF	Hal Robson-Kanu	2	0	3	4
3	5	(England)	CB	Kyle Bartley	3	0	0	3
3	6	(Nigeria)	CB	Semi Ajayi	2	1	0	3
6	17	(Senegal)	CF	Mbaye Diagne	3	0	0	2
6	18	(England)	CM	Conor Gallagher	2	0	0	2
8	2	(England)	RB	Darnell Furlong	1	0	0	1
8	10	(Scotland)	LW	Matt Phillips	2	0	0	1
8	11	(England)	LW	Grady Diangana	1	0	0	1
8	16	(England)	CM	Rakeem Harper	0	0	1	1
8	29	(England)	CF	Karlan Grant	1	0	0	1
Own Goals					2	0	0	1
Total					35	2	5	42

=== Disciplinary record ===
As of 9 March 2021

Rank	No.	Nat.	Po.	Name	Premier League			FA Cup			League Cup			Total			
Rank	No.	Nat.	Po.	Name	Booked	(yellow card) (yellow-red card)	Sent off (straight red)	Booked	(yellow card) (yellow-red card)	Sent off (straight red)	Booked	(yellow card) (yellow-red card)	Sent off (straight red)	Booked	(yellow card) (yellow-red card)	Sent off (straight red)	
1	18	(England)	CM	Conor Gallagher	8	0	0	1	0	0	0	0	0	9	0	0	
2	6	(Nigeria)	CB	Semi Ajayi	3	0	1	1	0	0	0	0	0	4	0	1	
3	27	(Republic of Ireland)	CB	Dara O'Shea	3	0	0	0	0	0	1	0	0	4	0	0	
4	2	(England)	RB	Darnell Furlong	3	0	0	0	0	0	0	0	0	3	0	0	
4	5	(England)	CB	Kyle Bartley	3	0	0	0	0	0	0	0	0	3	0	0	
4	8	(England)	CM	Jake Livermore	2	0	1	0	0	0	0	0	0	2	0	1	
4	12	(Brazil)	RW	Matheus Pereira	2	0	1	0	0	0	0	0	0	2	0	1	
8	3	(England)	LB	Kieran Gibbs	1	0	1	0	0	0	0	0	0	1	0	1	
8	19	(Saint Kitts and Nevis)	DM	Romaine Sawyers	2	0	0	0	0	0	0	0	0	2	0	0	
8	20	(Serbia)	CB	Branislav Ivanović	2	0	0	0	0	0	0	0	0	2	0	0	
8	23	(Scotland)	RW	Robert Snodgrass	2	0	0	0	0	0	0	0	0	2	0	0	
12	4	(Wales)	CF	Hal Robson-Kanu	1	0	0	0	0	0	0	0	0	1	0	0	
12	10	(Scotland)	RW	Matt Phillips	1	0	0	0	0	0	0	0	0	1	0	0	
12	17	(Senegal)	CF	Mbaye Diagne	1	0	0	0	0	0	0	0	0	1	0	0	
12	22	(England)	RB	Lee Peltier	1	0	0	0	0	0	0	0	0	1	0	0	
12	28	(England)	CB	Sam Field	0	0	0	0	0	0	1	0	0	1	0	0	
12	29	(England)	CF	Karlan Grant	1	0	0	0	0	0	0	0	0	1	0	0	
12	30	(England)	DM	Ainsley Maitland-Niles	1	0	0	0	0	0	0	0	0	1	0	0	
12	35	(Turkey)	DM	Okay Yokuşlu	1	0	0	0	0	0	0	0	0	1	0	0	
12	Total					38	0	4	2	0	0	2	0	0	43	0	4
