= Nathan Ferguson =

Nathan Ferguson may refer to:

- Nathan Ferguson (footballer, born 1995), English footballer who plays for Southend United
- Nathan Ferguson (footballer, born 2000), English footballer who plays for Crystal Palace
