= Grady Diangana =

DR Congolese footballer (born 1998)

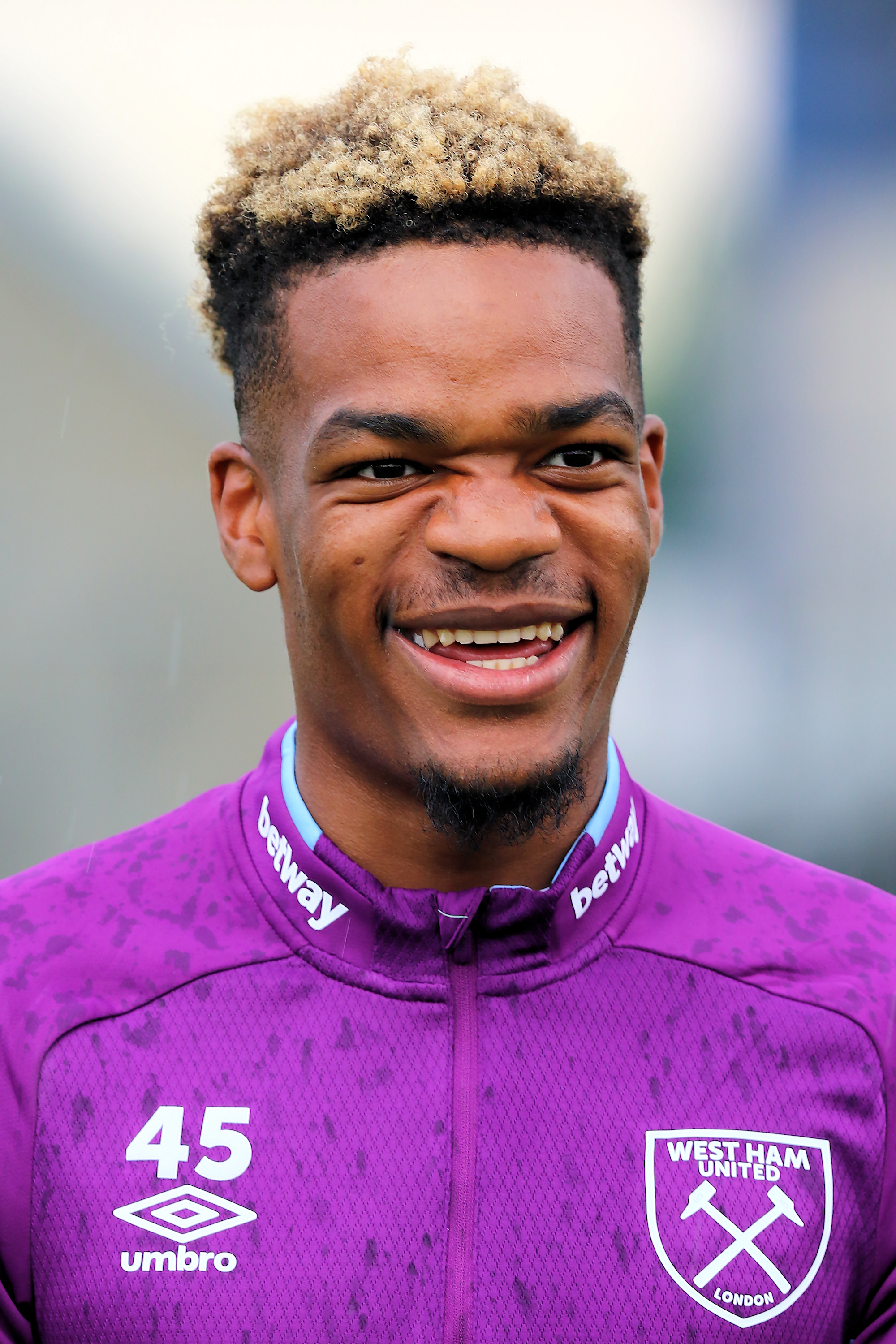
- Diangana with West Ham United in 2019

Personal information
- Full name: Grady George Diangana
- Date of birth: 19 April 1998 (age 28)
- Place of birth: Lubumbashi, DR Congo
- Height: 1.80 m (5 ft 11 in)
- Positions: Attacking midfielder; winger

Team information
- Current team: Elche
- Number: 19

Youth career
- 2010–2016: West Ham United

Senior career*
Years	Team	Apps	(Gls)
2016–2020	West Ham United	17	(0)
2019–2020	→ West Bromwich Albion (loan)	30	(8)
2020–2025	West Bromwich Albion	162	(18)
2025–	Elche	20	(1)

International career^{‡}
2018–2019	England U20	2	(0)
2019	England U21	1	(0)
2023–	DR Congo	9	(0)
- * Club domestic league appearances and goals as of 27 May 2026 ‡ National team caps and goals as of 23:15, 25 March 2026 (UTC)

Grady George Diangana (born 19 April 1998) is a Congolese professional footballer who plays for Spanish club Elche in La Liga. He has previously played for West Ham United and West Bromwich Albion. A former youth international for England, Diangana plays for the DR Congo national team.

== Early life ==
Diangana was born in the Democratic Republic of Congo. His family moved to the United Kingdom when he was four years old. Diangana grew up in Woolwich, London.

== Club career ==
=== West Ham United ===
Diangana joined the West Ham youth system in 2010, aged 12. Originally a striker, he began playing as an attacking midfielder at under-15 level. He made his under-18 debut for the club in February 2014, and his Premier League 2 debut in January 2015. He signed his first professional contract with the Hammers on 14 May 2016. He signed a new two-year contract in June 2018.

On 26 September 2018, Diangana made his first team debut in the EFL Cup against Macclesfield Town, playing the full game and scoring two goals in an 8–0 victory at the London Stadium, in which fellow debutants Conor Coventry and Joe Powell also featured. Three days later, Diangana made his first Premier League appearance, coming on as a 93rd-minute substitute for Felipe Anderson in a 3–1 home victory against Manchester United. Diangana became a regular in the team following an injury to Andriy Yarmolenko, making his first Premier League start against Leicester City on 27 October and registering his first league assist in the following game, against Burnley. On 18 January 2019, Diangana signed a new six-year contract that would have kept him at West Ham until 2025.

==== Loan to West Bromwich Albion ====
On 8 August 2019, Diangana joined West Bromwich Albion on loan until the end of the season He made his West Brom debut on 13 August 2019 in a 2–1 home defeat by Millwall in the first round of the EFL Cup. Diangana scored his first two goals for West Brom on his league debut, on 17 August 2019. Coming on at half-time for Kyle Edwards against Luton Town, scoring two goals in six minutes in a 2–1 win which ended Luton's run of 28 home games unbeaten. Diangana played 30 times in the league for Albion, scoring eight goals as they won promotion to the Premier League. This included a goal and an assist in the final game of the season, a 2–2 draw against Queens Park Rangers as Albion returned to the top flight after a two-year absence.

=== West Bromwich Albion ===
On 4 September 2020, West Bromwich Albion announced the signing of Diangana for an undisclosed fee on a five-year deal. The decision to sell him by West Ham chairman David Sullivan was controversial at the time amongst both fans and players. West Ham club captain Mark Noble openly stated that he was "angry and sad that Grady has left" in a comment which gathered support from fellow players including Declan Rice and Jack Wilshere.

Diangana scored his first Premier League goal in a 5–2 defeat to Everton. It was a long-range solo effort from 20 yards out which beat Jordan Pickford into the bottom right hand corner. Despite a difficult start to the season for West Brom, Diangana was a regular starter on the left flank under manager Slaven Bilić.

After 202 appearances and 26 goals, Diangana was released by West Brom at the end of the 2024-25 season upon the conclusion of his contract.

=== Elche ===
On 30 August 2025, Elche CF of the Spanish First Division announced the signing of Diangana on a two-year deal.

== International career ==
In November 2018, Diangana received his first international call-up, for England U20, for a game against Germany U20. He made his England debut on 19 November in a 2–0 win against Germany.

In September 2019, Diangana was called into the England U21 team for the first time, for matches against Turkey U21 and Kosovo U21 after impressing with three goals in his first four matches on loan in the Championship with West Bromwich Albion. Diangana made his U21 debut during a 2–1 defeat to the Netherlands in Doetinchem on 19 November 2019.

Diangana switched allegiance to his country of birth at senior level in 2023, and was called up by DR Congo for the first time on 2 October for their friendlies against New Zealand and Portugal. He made his debut on 13 October in a 1–1 draw with New Zealand in a friendly match played in Spain.

== Style of play ==
Diangana generally plays as a right-sided attacking midfielder but can play across the forward line. He cites Ronaldinho as an influence. In 2019, after breaking in to the West Ham first team under Manuel Pellegrini, he stated "The manager's style of play is what I've grown up watching and trying to take into my game. For me, it's been perfect" as well as citing West Ham United Academy coach Trevor Bumstead for encouraging him to express himself from a young age.

== Career statistics ==
=== Club ===
As of match played 12 May 2026

Appearances and goals by club, season and competition
Club	Season	League			FA Cup		EFL Cup		Other		Total	
Club	Season	Division	Apps	Goals	Apps	Goals	Apps	Goals	Apps	Goals	Apps	Goals
West Ham United	2018–19	Premier League	17	0	2	0	2	2	—		21	2
West Bromwich Albion (loan)	2019–20	Championship	30	8	0	0	1	0	—		31	8
West Bromwich Albion	2020–21	Premier League	20	1	0	0	1	0	—		21	1
West Bromwich Albion	2021–22	Championship	41	2	1	0	0	0	—		42	2
West Bromwich Albion	2022–23	Championship	31	4	3	0	1	0	—		35	4
West Bromwich Albion	2023–24	Championship	36	7	0	0	0	0	2 (Note: Appearances in Championship Play-offs)	0	38	7
West Bromwich Albion	2024–25	Championship	34	4	1	0	0	0	—		35	4
Total			162	18	5	0	2	0	2	0	171	18
Elche	2025–26	La Liga	19	1	1	0	—		—		20	1
Career total			228	27	8	0	5	2	2	0	243	29

=== International ===
As of match played 25 March 2026

Appearances and goals by national team and year
National team	Year	Apps	Goals
DR Congo	2023	2	0
DR Congo	2024	4	0
DR Congo	2025	2	0
DR Congo	2026	1	0
Total		9	0
