= 2019–20 West Bromwich Albion F.C. season =

West Bromwich Albion F.C.
2019–20 season
- Owner: Lai Guochuan
- Head Coach: Slaven Bilić
- Stadium: The Hawthorns
- Championship: 2nd (promoted)
- FA Cup: Fifth round
- EFL Cup: First round
- Top goalscorer: League: Hal Robson-Kanu; Charlie Austin (10 each); All: Charlie Austin (11)
- Average home league attendance: 24,153
Home colours	Away colours	Third colours

The 2019–20 season was West Bromwich Albion's second consecutive season in the Championship since 2017–18 and their 142nd year in existence. This season, the club participated in the Championship, the FA Cup and the League Cup. The season covered the period from 1 July 2019 to 22 July 2020.

Albion finished as runners-up in the Championship, thus gaining automatic promotion to the Premier League. They became the first club to achieve a fifth Premier League promotion.

== Pre-season ==
13 July 2019 Friendly	Villarreal	3–0	West Bromwich Albion	La Nucia, Spain
19:00 CEST	Moreno 9'; Trigueros 45+4' (pen.); Bacca 82'	Report		Stadium: Ciudad Deportiva Camilo Cano; Attendance: 1,900 (est)

16 July 2019 Friendly	Bury	P–P	West Bromwich Albion	Bury
				Stadium: Gigg Lane
Note: Match cancelled due to West Brom's pre season tour being extended.

20 July 2019 Friendly	Scunthorpe United	0–4	West Bromwich Albion	Scunthorpe
15:00 BST		Report	Phillips 47', 51'; Krovinović 50'; Robson-Kanu 83'	Stadium: Glanford Park

23 July 2019 Friendly	Rotherham United	1–1	West Bromwich Albion	Rotherham
19:45 BST	Ladapo 3' (pen.)	Report	O'Shea 63'	Stadium: New York Stadium; Attendance: 2,484

26 July 2019 Friendly	West Bromwich Albion	0–0	Bournemouth	West Bromwich
20:00 BST		Report		Stadium: The Hawthorns

== Competitions ==
=== League table ===
Pos	Team	Pld	W	D	L	GF	GA	GD	Pts	Promotion, qualification or relegation
1	Leeds United (C, P)	46	28	9	9	77	35	+42	93	Promotion to the Premier League
2	West Bromwich Albion (P)	46	22	17	7	77	45	+32	83	Promotion to the Premier League
3	Brentford	46	24	9	13	80	38	+42	81	Qualification for Championship play-offs (Note: Four teams play for one spot and promotion to the Premier League.)
4	Fulham (O, P)	46	23	12	11	64	48	+16	81	Qualification for Championship play-offs
5	Cardiff City	46	19	16	11	68	58	+10	73	Qualification for Championship play-offs
6	Swansea City	46	18	16	12	62	53	+9	70	Qualification for Championship play-offs

Source: EFL Official Website
Rules for classification: 1) Points; 2) Goal difference; 3) Number of goals scored; 4) Head-to-head results; 5) Wins; 6) Away goals; 7) Penalty points (sec 9.5); 8) 12-point sending off offences
(C) Champions; (O) Play-off winners; (P) Promoted

==== Results summary ====
Overall								Home						Away					
Pld	W	D	L	GF	GA	GD	Pts	W	D	L	GF	GA	GD	W	D	L	GF	GA	GD
46	22	17	7	77	45	+32	83	10	10	3	44	28	+16	12	7	4	33	17	+16

Last updated: 22 July 2020.
Source: BBC

==== Results by matchday ====
Matchday	1	2	3	4	5	6	7	8	9	10	11	12	13	14	15	16	17	18	19	20	21	22	23	24	25	26	27	28	29	30	31	32	33	34	35	36	37	38	39	40	41	42	43	44	45	46
Ground	A	H	A	H	A	H	A	H	A	A	H	A	H	H	A	A	H	H	A	H	A	A	H	A	H	H	A	H	A	H	A	A	H	A	H	H	A	H	A	A	H	H	A	H	A	H
Result	W	D	W	D	D	W	D	W	W	L	W	W	D	D	W	W	W	W	W	W	D	W	D	D	L	D	D	L	L	W	W	W	D	W	W	L	D	D	L	W	W	W	D	D	L	D
Position	8	5	3	6	8	4	6	4	1	3	1	1	1	1	1	1	1	1	1	1	2	1	1	1	2	2	1	1	2	1	1	1	1	1	1	1	2	1	2	2	2	2	2	2	2	2

Updated to match(es) played on 22 July 2020. Source: 11v11 for league tables and fixtures
A = Away; H = Home; W = Win; D = Draw; L = Loss

==== Matches ====
On Thursday, 20 June 2019, the EFL Championship fixtures were revealed.

3 August 2019 1	Nottingham Forest	1–2	West Bromwich Albion	West Bridgford
17:30 BST	Cash 8'	Report	Edwards 15'; Phillips 26'; Sawyers (yellow card) 85'	Stadium: City Ground; Attendance: 27,582 (1,991 away); Referee: Darren England
Note: Live on Sky Sports

10 August 2019 2	West Bromwich Albion	1–1	Millwall	West Bromwich
15:00 BST	Bartley 57'; Ajayi (yellow card) 67'	Report	Wallace (yellow card) 62'; Thompson (yellow card) 69'; Smith 75'	Stadium: The Hawthorns; Attendance: 24,305 (1,567 away); Referee: David Webb

17 August 2019 3	Luton Town	1–2	West Bromwich Albion	Luton
15:00 BST	Cornick 15'; Potts (yellow card) 65'; Shinnie (yellow card) 89'	Report	Diangana 48', 51'	Stadium: Kenilworth Road; Attendance: 10,059 (1,033 away); Referee: Andy Woolmer

21 August 2019 4	West Bromwich Albion	1–1	Reading	West Bromwich
20:00 BST	Gibbs (yellow card) 40'; Sawyers (yellow card) 49'; Zohore 88' (pen.)	Report	Yiadom (yellow card) 50'; Ejaria 71'; Adam (yellow card) 90+4'	Stadium: The Hawthorns; Attendance: 21,803 (893 away); Referee: Peter Bankes

24 August 2019 5	Derby County	1–1	West Bromwich Albion	Derby
12:30 BST	Waghorn 6' (pen.) (penalty missed) 43'; Lawrence (yellow card) 90'	Report	Ferguson (yellow card) 37'; Zohore 84' (pen.)	Stadium: Pride Park Stadium; Attendance: 26,718 (2,384 away); Referee: Gavin Ward
Note: Live on Sky Sports

31 August 2019 6	West Bromwich Albion	3–2	Blackburn Rovers	West Bromwich
15:00 BST	Phillips 22'; Livermore 31'; Diangana 40'; Ferguson (yellow card) 65'; Pereira (yellow card) 79'	Report	Dack 1'; Lenihan (yellow card) 40'; Johnson 45+2'; Travis (yellow card) 69'	Stadium: The Hawthorns; Attendance: 23,792 (1,333 away); Referee: Tony Harrington

14 September 2019 7	Fulham	1–1	West Bromwich Albion	Fulham
12:30 BST	Sessegnon (yellow card) 41'; Knockaert 49'; Odoi (yellow card) 90+4'	Report	Furlong (yellow card) 56'; Ajayi 80'	Stadium: Craven Cottage; Attendance: 17,770 (1,900 away); Referee: David Webb
Note: Live on Sky Sports

22 September 2019 8	West Bromwich Albion	4–2	Huddersfield Town	West Bromwich
12:00 BST	Phillips 19', 74'; Furlong 70'; Ajayi 89'	Report	O'Brien 16'; Grant 36'	Stadium: The Hawthorns; Attendance: 23,977 (1,107 away); Referee: Tim Robinson
Note: Live on Sky Sports

29 September 2019 9	Queens Park Rangers	0–2	West Bromwich Albion	Shepherd's Bush
12:30 BST	Cameron (yellow card) 22'; Barbet (yellow card) 34' (red card) 82'	Report	Furlong (yellow card) 16'; Ferguson 53'; Pereira 84'; Robson-Kanu (yellow card) 89'	Stadium: Loftus Road; Attendance: 13,959 (2,568 away); Referee: Geoff Eltringham
Note: Live on Sky Sports

1 October 2019 10	Leeds United	1–0	West Bromwich Albion	Leeds
19:45 BST	Alioski (yellow card) 18' (goal) 38'	Report	Robson-Kanu (yellow card) 23'; Bartley (yellow card) 25'; Sawyers (yellow card) 27'; Ajayi (yellow card) 65'; Diangana (yellow card) 90'	Stadium: Elland Road; Attendance: 34,648 (981 away); Referee: David Coote
Note: Live on Sky Sports

5 October 2019 11	West Bromwich Albion	4–2	Cardiff City	West Bromwich
15:00 BST	Pereira 20'; Livermore (yellow card) 32'; Diangana 42'; Austin 71'; Sawyers 90'	Report	Ward 75', 86'; Pack (yellow card) 88'	Stadium: The Hawthorns; Attendance: 25,140 (2,000 away); Referee: John Brooks

19 October 2019 12	Middlesbrough	0–1	West Bromwich Albion	Middlesbrough
15:00 BST	Tavernier (yellow card) 47'; Howson (yellow card) 84'	Report	Austin (yellow card) 25'; Ferguson (yellow card) 64'; Livermore (yellow card) 80'; Robson-Kanu 82'; Hegazi (yellow card) 90+3'	Stadium: Riverside Stadium; Attendance: 20,174 (1,651 away); Referee: Oliver Langford

22 October 2019 13	West Bromwich Albion	2–2	Barnsley	West Bromwich
20:00 BST	Furlong (yellow card) 40'; Sawyers (yellow card) 42'; Diaby 68' (o.g.); Pereira 81'; Townsend (yellow card) 90+5'	Report	Woodrow 18', 24'; Brown (yellow card) 22'; Andersen (yellow card) 32'; Dougall (yellow card) 60'; Cavaré (yellow card) 74'; Collins (yellow card) 77'; Chaplin (yellow card) 84'; McGeehan (yellow card) 85'; Mowatt (yellow card) 90+3'	Stadium: The Hawthorns; Attendance: 22,086 (835 away); Referee: Darren Bond

26 October 2019 14	West Bromwich Albion	2–2	Charlton Athletic	West Bromwich
15:00 BST	Livermore (yellow card) 2'; Phillips 10'; Ferguson (red card) 67'; Robson-Kanu 81'; Bartley (yellow card) 84'	Report	Lockyer (yellow card) 41'; Bonne 60'; Gallagher (yellow card) 76'; Cullen 90+4' (pen.) (yellow card) 90+6'	Stadium: The Hawthorns; Attendance: 25,356 (1,972 away); Referee: Matt Donohue

4 November 2019 15	Stoke City	0–2	West Bromwich Albion	Stoke-on-Trent
20:00 GMT	Clucas (yellow card) 29'; Carter-Vickers (yellow card) 66'	Report	Phillips 8'; Livermore (yellow card) 38'; Robson-Kanu 69' (pen.)	Stadium: Bet365 Stadium; Attendance: 22,360 (2,557 away); Referee: Tim Robinson

9 November 2019 16	Hull City	0–1	West Bromwich Albion	Hull
15:00 GMT	Eaves (yellow card) 69' de Wijs (yellow card) 87'; Lichaj (yellow card) 90+3'	Report	Livermore (yellow card) 16' (goal) 28'; Sawyers (yellow card) 90'; Johnstone (yellow card) 90+1'	Stadium: KCOM Stadium; Attendance: 13,866 (2,094 away); Referee: James Linington

23 November 2019 17	West Bromwich Albion	2–1	Sheffield Wednesday	West Bromwich
15:00 GMT	Robson-Kanu 10'; Phillips (yellow card) 63'; Austin 88' (pen.)		Lee (yellow card) 23'; Hutchinson (yellow card) 42'; Fletcher 58' (pen.); Harris (yellow card) 60'; Palmer (red card) 90+2'	Stadium: The Hawthorns; Attendance: 25,566 (1,982 away); Referee: Tony Harrington

27 November 2019 18	West Bromwich Albion	4–1	Bristol City	West Bromwich
20:00 GMT	Gibbs 10'; Pereira 39'; Robson-Kanu 82'; Austin 87'	Report	Williams (yellow card) 52'; Smith (yellow card) 56'; Diédhiou 80'	Stadium: The Hawthorns; Attendance: 22,197 (1,374 away); Referee: Geoff Eltringham

2 December 2019 19	Preston North End	0–1	West Bromwich Albion	Preston
19:45 GMT		Report	Ajayi (yellow card) 50'; Austin 90' (pen.)	Stadium: Deepdale; Attendance: 13,015 (1,357 away); Referee: Oliver Langford

8 December 2019 20	West Bromwich Albion	5–1	Swansea City	West Bromwich
12:00 GMT	Ajayi 25'; Pereira 34'; Robson-Kanu 44'; Ferguson (yellow card) 53'; Phillips 70'; Edwards 74'	Report	Surridge 39'; Grimes (yellow card) 40'; Fulton (yellow card) 50'	Stadium: The Hawthorns; Attendance: 22,927 (1,803 away); Referee: Keith Stroud

11 December 2019 21	Wigan Athletic	1–1	West Bromwich Albion	Wigan
19.45 GMT	Johnstone 50' (o.g.); Massey (yellow card) 82'	Report	Austin 59'; Sawyers (yellow card) 73'; Bartley (yellow card) 90+3'	Stadium: DW Stadium; Attendance: 9,444 (1,367 away); Referee: Andy Davies

14 December 2019 22	Birmingham City	2–3	West Bromwich Albion	Birmingham
12.30 BST	Jutkiewicz 3'; Dean 47'	Report	Diangana 10'; Austin 73', 81'	Stadium: St Andrew's; Attendance: 20,796 (2,768 away); Referee: Darren England

21 December 2019 23	West Bromwich Albion	1–1	Brentford	West Bromwich
15.00 BST	Furlong 45+1'; Livermore (yellow card) 56'; Ferguson (yellow card) 76'	Report	Mbeumo (yellow card) 37'; Dalsgaard 43'	Stadium: The Hawthorns; Attendance: 24,961 (1,465 away); Referee: Darren Bond

26 December 2019 24	Barnsley	1–1	West Bromwich Albion	Barnsley
15:00 GMT	Diaby (yellow card) 11'; Halme 90'	Report	Krovinović 5' (yellow card) 63'; Robson-Kanu (yellow card) 85'; Hegazi (yellow card) 90+2'	Stadium: Oakwell; Attendance: 17,049 (3,579 away); Referee: Tony Harrington

29 December 2019 25	West Bromwich Albion	0–2	Middlesbrough	West Bromwich
15.00 BST	Livermore (yellow card) 57'; Phillips (yellow card) 69'; Austin (yellow card) 72'; Furlong (yellow card) 82'	Report	Ayala 17'; Howson (yellow card) 48'; Spence (yellow card) 69'; Coulson (yellow card) 85'; Fletcher 90+4'	Stadium: The Hawthorns; Attendance: 25,077 (1,232 away); Referee: Geoff Eltringham

1 January 2020 26	West Bromwich Albion	1–1	Leeds United	West Bromwich
17:15 GMT	Ajayi 2'; Krovinović (yellow card) 40'; Bartley (yellow card) 72'	Report	Ajayi 52' (o.g.); Cooper (yellow card) 67'; Ayling (yellow card) 70'; Costa (yellow card) 87'	Stadium: The Hawthorns; Attendance: 25,618 (1,989 away); Referee: Robert Jones

11 January 2020 27	Charlton Athletic	2–2	West Bromwich Albion	Charlton
15:00 GMT	Davison 28'; Lockyer (yellow card) 43'; Johnstone 76' (o.g.); Green (yellow card) 90'	Report	Ajayi (yellow card) 12'; Zohore 22'; Robson-Kanu (yellow card) 43' (goal) 46'; Sawyers (yellow card) 45'; Phillips (yellow card) 85'; Pereira (yellow card) 90'; Diangana (yellow card) 90'	Stadium: The Valley; Attendance: 19,720 (3,154 away); Referee: Jarred Gillett

20 January 2020 28	West Bromwich Albion	0–1	Stoke City	West Bromwich
20:00 GMT	Bartley (yellow card) 45+1'	Report	Campbell 9'; Lindsay (yellow card) 28'; Allen (yellow card) 45+1'; Smith (yellow card) 90+2'	Stadium: The Hawthorns; Attendance: 23,199 (1,483 away); Referee: Tim Robinson

28 January 2020 29	Cardiff City	2–1	West Bromwich Albion	Cardiff
19:45 GMT	Paterson 46'; Nelson (yellow card) 65'; Tomlin 76'	Report	Austin 61' (pen.)	Stadium: Cardiff City Stadium; Attendance: 22,516 (1,138 away); Referee: Robert Jones

1 February 2020 30	West Bromwich Albion	2–0	Luton Town	West Bromwich
15:00 GMT	Daniels 14' (o.g.); Ajayi 70'	Report	Potts (yellow card) 24'	Stadium: The Hawthorns; Attendance: 25,141 (1,534 away); Referee: Steve Martin

9 February 2020 31	Millwall	0–2	West Bromwich Albion	Bermondsey
13:30 GMT	Smith (yellow card) 23'; Böðvarsson (yellow card) 90+2'	Report	Krovinović 42'; Robinson (yellow card) 50'; O'Shea 84' (yellow card) 90+2'	Stadium: The Den; Attendance: 13,818 (1,382 away); Referee: Gavin Ward

12 February 2020 32	Reading	1–2	West Bromwich Albion	Reading
20:00 GMT	Pușcaș 11' (pen.); Yiadom (yellow card) 20'; Obita (yellow card) 38'	Report	Bartley (yellow card) 10' (goal) 49'; Pereira 26'; Sawyers (yellow card) 31'	Stadium: Madejski Stadium; Attendance: 13,942 (1,403 away); Referee: Matt Donohue

15 February 2020 33	West Bromwich Albion	2–2	Nottingham Forest	West Bromwich
12:30 GMT	Robinson 37'; Figueiredo 65' (o.g.); Phillips (yellow card) 75'	Report	Cash (yellow card) 27' (goal) 90+1'; Sow (yellow card) 40'; Bartley 45' (o.g.); Samba (yellow card) 71'	Stadium: The Hawthorns; Attendance: 25,117 (1,977 away); Referee: Keith Stroud

22 February 2020 34	Bristol City	0–3	West Bromwich Albion	Ashton Gate
15:00 GMT	Benković (yellow card) 29'; Paterson (yellow card) 77'	Report	O'Shea (yellow card) 15'; Robinson 32'; Robson-Kanu 36', 79'; Sawyers (red card) 77'	Stadium: Ashton Gate Stadium; Attendance: 24,022 (2,992 away); Referee: Darren England

25 February 2020 35	West Bromwich Albion	2–0	Preston North End	West Bromwich
20:00 GMT	Robson-Kanu 6'; Livermore 45'	Report	Fisher (red card) 64'	Stadium: The Hawthorns; Attendance: 22,150 (925 away); Referee: Kevin Friend

29 February 2020 36	West Bromwich Albion	0–1	Wigan Athletic	West Bromwich
15:00 GMT	Townsend (yellow card) 86'; Periera (yellow card) 90+3'	Report	Morsy 73'; Williams (yellow card) 90+1'	Stadium: The Hawthorns; Attendance: 24,942 (879 away); Referee: Tony Harrington

7 March 2020 37	Swansea City	0–0	West Bromwich Albion	Swansea
15:00 GMT	Kalulu (yellow card) 61'	Report	O'Shea (yellow card) 20'; Edwards (yellow card) 87'	Stadium: Liberty Stadium; Attendance: 16,788 (2,077 away); Referee: Robert Jones

20 June 2020 38	West Bromwich Albion	0–0	Birmingham City	West Bromwich
15:00 BST	Edwards (yellow card) 75'	Report	Crowley (yellow card) 29'; Clarke-Salter (yellow card) 65'; Kieftenbeld (yellow card) 90+1'	Stadium: The Hawthorns; Attendance: 0 Referee: Darren Bond
Note: Season was suspended until 3 April 2020, due to the COVID-19 pandemic. The match was rescheduled to 20 June.

26 June 2020 39	Brentford	1–0	West Bromwich Albion	Brentford
19:45 BST	Watkins 16'; Nørgaard (yellow card) 45+2'; Marcondes (yellow card) 55'	Report	Sawyers (yellow card) 55'	Stadium: Griffin Park; Attendance: 0 Referee: Keith Stroud
Note: Season was suspended until 3 April 2020, due to the COVID-19 pandemic. The match was rescheduled to 26 June.

1 July 2020 40	Sheffield Wednesday	0–3	West Bromwich Albion	Owlerton
19:45 BST		Report	Austin 37' (pen.) (yellow card) 66'; Sawyers (yellow card) 53'; Pereira 58', 85' (yellow card) 80'; O'Shea (yellow card) 61'	Stadium: Hillsborough; Attendance: 0 Referee: David Webb
Note: Season was suspended until 3 April 2020, due to the COVID-19 pandemic. The match was rescheduled to 1 July.

5 July 2020 41	West Bromwich Albion	4–2	Hull City	West Bromwich
15:00 BST	Austin 4'; Hegazi (yellow card) 12' (yellow-red card) 90+2' (goal) 37'; Grosicki 49'; Diangana 76'; Bartley (yellow card) 78'	Report	Stewart 24'; Wilks 48'; Toral (yellow card) 79'	Stadium: The Hawthorns; Attendance: 0 Referee: Oliver Langford
Note: On 3 April, the English Football League decided to postpone all football until safe to do so due to the COVID-19 pandemic. The match was rescheduled to 5 July.

8 July 2020 42	West Bromwich Albion	2–0	Derby County	West Bromwich
20:00 BST	Diangana 11'; O'Shea 76'	Report	Shinnie (yellow card) 24'; Whittaker (yellow card) 45+4'; Knight (yellow card) 73'; Bogle (yellow card) 88'; Sibley (red card) 90+1'	Stadium: The Hawthorns; Attendance: 0 Referee: Jeremy Simpson
Note: On 3 April, the English Football League decided to postpone all football until safe to do so due to the COVID-19 pandemic. The match was rescheduled to 8 July.

11 July 2020 43	Blackburn Rovers	1–1	West Bromwich Albion	Blackburn
15:00 BST	Rothwell 63'; Travis (yellow card) 62'; Lenihan (yellow card) 90+2'	Report	Livermore (yellow card) 31'; Krovinović 41'; Ajayi (yellow card) 90'	Stadium: Ewood Park; Attendance: 0 Referee: Jarred Gillett
Note: On 3 April, the English Football League decided to postpone all football until safe to do so due to the COVID-19 pandemic. The match was rescheduled to 11 July.

14 July 2020 44	West Bromwich Albion	0–0	Fulham	West Bromwich
17:00 BST	Pereira (yellow card) 50'; Livermore (yellow card) 55'; Townsend (yellow card) 86'	Report		Stadium: The Hawthorns; Attendance: 0 Referee: Geoff Eltringham
Note: On 3 April, the English Football League decided to postpone all football until safe to do so due to the COVID-19 pandemic. The match was rescheduled to 14 July.

17 July 2020 45	Huddersfield Town	2–1	West Bromwich Albion	Huddersfield
17:30 BST	Willock 4', (yellow card) 23'; Chalobah (yellow card) 19'; Campbell (yellow card) 60'; Lössl (yellow card) 85'; Smith Rowe 86'	Report	Phillips (yellow card) 30'; Robson-Kanu (yellow card) 38'; O'Shea 42'; Townsend (yellow card) 53'; Krovinović (yellow card) 81'; Furlong (yellow card) 88'; Austin (yellow card) 90+1'	Stadium: John Smith’s Stadium; Attendance: 0 Referee: John Brooks
Note: On 3 April, the English Football League decided to postpone all football until safe to do so due to the COVID-19 pandemic. The match was rescheduled to 17 July.

22 July 2020 46	West Bromwich Albion	2–2	Queens Park Rangers	West Bromwich
19:30 BST	Diangana 44'; Robinson 49'	Report	Manning 34'; Eze 61'	Stadium: The Hawthorns; Attendance: 0 Referee: Darren England
Note: On 3 April, the English Football League decided to postpone all football until safe to do so due to the COVID-19 pandemic. The match was rescheduled to 22 July.

=== FA Cup ===
The third round draw was made live on BBC Two from Etihad Stadium, Micah Richards and Tony Adams conducted the draw. The fourth round draw was made by Alex Scott and David O'Leary on Monday, 6 January. The draw for the fifth round was made on 27 January 2020, live on The One Show.

5 January 2020 Third round	Charlton Athletic	0–1	West Bromwich Albion	Charlton
15:00 GMT	Sarpong-Wiredu (yellow card) 69'	Report	Zohore 32'; Harper (yellow card) 72'	Stadium: The Valley; Attendance: 6,426; Referee: David Webb

25 January 2020 Fourth round	West Ham United	0–1	West Bromwich Albion	Stratford
15:00 GMT	Diop (yellow card) 49'	Report	Townsend 9'; Barry (yellow card) 39'; Ajayi (yellow card) 44' (yellow-red card) 72'	Stadium: London Stadium; Attendance: 58,911 (4,976 away); Referee: Stuart Attwell

3 March 2020 Fifth round	West Bromwich Albion	2–3	Newcastle United	West Bromwich
19:45 GMT	Phillips 74'; Zohore 90+3'	Report	Almirón 33', 45+1'; Rose (yellow card) 43'; Lazaro 47'; Bentaleb (yellow card) 63'; Darlow (yellow card) 78'	Stadium: The Hawthorns; Attendance: 21,557 (4,629 away fans); Referee: Anthony Taylor

=== EFL Cup ===
The first round draw was made on 20 June.

13 August 2019 First round	West Bromwich Albion	1–2	Millwall	West Bromwich
20:00 BST	Austin 9'	Report	Bradshaw 28'; O'Brien 55'; Hutchinson (yellow card) 68'; Thompson (yellow card) 90'	Stadium: The Hawthorns; Attendance: 10,704; Referee: Ross Joyce

== Transfers ==
=== Transfers in ===
Date	Position	Nationality	Name	From	Fee	Ref.
1 July 2019	FW	(England)	Owen Windsor	(England) Cirencester Town	Undisclosed	
19 July 2019	FW	(Denmark)	Kenneth Zohore	(Wales) Cardiff City	Undisclosed	
20 July 2019	CB	(Nigeria)	Semi Ajayi	(England) Rotherham United	Undisclosed	
23 July 2019	RB	(England)	Darnell Furlong	(England) Queens Park Rangers	Undisclosed	
27 July 2019	AM	(Saint Kitts and Nevis)	Romaine Sawyers	(England) Brentford	Undisclosed	
8 August 2019	CF	(England)	Charlie Austin	(England) Southampton	Undisclosed	
29 August 2019	GK	(Oman)	Ali Al-Habsi	(Saudi Arabia) Al-Hilal	Free transfer	
21 September 2019	CB	(England)	Saul Shotton	(England) Bury	Free transfer	
16 October 2019	FW	(France)	Cheikh Diaby	(France) Le Havre	Free transfer	
31 January 2020	LW	(Poland)	Kamil Grosicki	(England) Hull City	Undisclosed	
31 January 2020	RB	(England)	Lee Peltier	(Wales) Cardiff City	Free transfer	

=== Loans in ===
Date	Position	Nationality	Name	From	Date until	Ref.
5 July 2019	AM	(Croatia)	Filip Krovinović	(Portugal) Benfica	30 June 2020	
8 August 2019	RW	(England)	Grady Diangana	(England) West Ham United	30 June 2020	
8 August 2019	RW	(Brazil)	Matheus Pereira	(Portugal) Sporting CP	30 June 2020	
8 August 2019	LW	(England)	Chris Willock	(Portugal) Benfica	30 June 2020	
29 January 2020	LW	(Republic of Ireland)	Callum Robinson	(England) Sheffield United	30 June 2020	

=== Loans out ===
Date	Position	Nationality	Name	To	Date until	Ref.
16 July 2019	GK	(England)	Alex Palmer	(England) Plymouth Argyle	30 June 2020	
1 August 2019	GK	(England)	Ted Cann	(England) Worcester City	27 August 2019	
8 August 2019	CM	(England)	Sam Field	(England) Charlton Athletic	30 June 2020	
8 August 2019	RW	(England)	Jonathan Leko	(England) Charlton Athletic	30 June 2020	
9 August 2019	RB	(England)	Kane Wilson	(England) Tranmere Rovers	1 January 2020	
30 August 2019	RW	(Scotland)	Oliver Burke	(Spain) Alavés	30 June 2020	
2 September 2019	LB	(England)	Max Melbourne	(England) Lincoln City	6 January 2020	
7 September 2019	RW	(England)	Owen Windsor	(England) Cirencester Town	October 2019	
29 October 2019	RW	(England)	Stanley Asomugha	(England) Alvechurch	December 2019	
9 November 2019	CM	(Northern Ireland)	Jack Chambers	(England) Hednesford Town	December 2019	
10 January 2020	GK	(England)	Ted Cann	(England) Yeovil Town	6 February 2020	
27 January 2020	CF	(England)	Callum Morton	(England) Northampton Town	30 June 2020	
13 February 2020	CF	(England)	Jamie Soule	(England) Barrow	March 2020	
14 February 2020	RB	(Scotland)	Dan Meredith	(England) Leamington	March 2020	
21 February 2020	LW	(England)	Nick Clayton-Phillips	(England) Solihull Moors	March 2020	

=== Transfers out ===
Date	Position	Nationality	Name	To	Fee	Ref.
1 July 2019	DM	(England)	Gareth Barry	Free agent	Released	
1 July 2019	CM	(Finland)	Alex Bradley	(England) Lincoln City	Mutual consent	
1 July 2019	CB	(England)	Craig Dawson	(England) Watford	£5,500,000	
1 July 2019	AM	(Republic of Ireland)	Wes Hoolahan	(Australia) Newcastle Jets	Released	
1 July 2019	CB	(England)	Kyle Howkins	(Wales) Newport County	Free transfer	
1 July 2019	CB	(England)	Kyle Jameson	(England) AFC Fylde	Free transfer	
1 July 2019	RB	(England)	Tyrone Mears	Free agent	Released	
1 July 2019	CM	(Scotland)	James Morrison	Free agent	Released	
1 July 2019	GK	(Wales)	Boaz Myhill	Free agent	Released	
1 July 2019	GK	(Wales)	Adam Przybek	(England) Ipswich Town	Free transfer	
9 July 2019	CF	(England)	Jay Rodriguez	(England) Burnley	£10,000,000	
9 July 2019	LW	(England)	Morgan Rogers	(England) Manchester City	£4,000,000	
11 July 2019	CF	(England)	Louie Barry	(Spain) Barcelona	£235,000	
19 July 2019	CF	(Venezuela)	Salomón Rondón	(China) Dalian Yifang	£16,500,000	
24 July 2019	DF	(Cameroon)	Allan Nyom	(Spain) Getafe CF	Undisclosed	
10 January 2020	LB	(England)	Max Melbourne	(England) Lincoln City	Undisclosed	

== Appearances & Goals ==
As of 22 July 2020

No.	Pos	Nat	Player	Total		Championship		FA Cup		League Cup	
No.	Pos	Nat	Player	Apps	Goals	Apps	Goals	Apps	Goals	Apps	Goals
1	GK	(England) ENG	Sam Johnstone	46	0	46+0	0	0+0	0	0+0	0
2	DF	(England) ENG	Darnell Furlong	33	2	22+9	2	1+0	0	1+0	0
3	DF	(England) ENG	Kieran Gibbs	15	1	14+0	1	1+0	0	0+0	0
4	FW	(Wales) WAL	Hal Robson-Kanu	39	10	24+15	10	0+0	0	0+0	0
5	DF	(England) ENG	Kyle Bartley	40	2	37+1	2	1+1	0	0+0	0
6	DF	(Nigeria) NGR	Semi Ajayi	45	5	42+1	5	1+0	0	1+0	0
7	MF	(Croatia) CRO	Filip Krovinović	43	3	24+16	3	1+1	0	0+1	0
8	MF	(England) ENG	Jake Livermore	45	3	43+2	3	0+0	0	0+0	0
9	FW	(Denmark) DEN	Kenneth Zohore	20	5	5+12	3	1+2	2	0+0	0
10	MF	(Scotland) SCO	Matt Phillips	41	8	30+9	7	2+0	1	0+0	0
11	MF	(Northern Ireland) NIR	Chris Brunt	11	0	0+7	0	3+0	0	1+0	0
12	FW	(Brazil) BRA	Matheus Pereira	43	8	38+4	8	0+0	0	0+1	0
13	MF	(Poland) POL	Kamil Grosicki	14	2	4+10	2	0+0	0	0+0	0
14	DF	(England) ENG	Conor Townsend	30	1	19+8	0	2+0	1	1+0	0
15	FW	(England) ENG	Charlie Austin	38	11	18+16	10	3+0	0	1+0	1
16	MF	(England) ENG	Rekeem Harper	13	0	4+6	0	2+0	0	1+0	0
18	MF	(England) ENG	Gareth Barry	6	0	1+2	0	3+0	0	0+0	0
19	MF	(Saint Kitts and Nevis) SKN	Romaine Sawyers	43	1	42+0	1	0+0	0	0+1	0
21	MF	(England) ENG	Kyle Edwards	30	2	9+17	2	3+0	0	1+0	0
23	GK	(England) ENG	Jonathan Bond	4	0	0+0	0	3+0	0	1+0	0
26	DF	(Egypt) EGY	Ahmed Hegazi	18	1	14+2	1	2+0	0	0+0	0
27	DF	(Republic of Ireland) IRL	Dara O'Shea	21	3	16+1	3	3+0	0	1+0	0
29	MF	(England) ENG	Grady Diangana	31	8	23+7	8	0+0	0	1+0	0
31	FW	(England) ENG	Rayhaan Tulloch	3	0	0+0	0	0+3	0	0+0	0
32	DF	(England) ENG	Jack Fitzwater	1	0	0+0	0	1+0	0	0+0	0
36	DF	(England) ENG	Nathan Ferguson	21	1	21+0	1	0+0	0	0+0	0
44	DF	(England) ENG	Saul Shotton	1	0	0+0	0	0+1	0	0+0	0
47	FW	(Republic of Ireland) IRL	Callum Robinson	16	3	10+6	3	0+0	0	0+0	0
Players out on loan:
17	MF	(Scotland) SCO	Oliver Burke	3	0	0+2	0	0+0	0	1+0	0

=== Goals record ===
As of 22 July 2020

Rank	No.	Nat.	Po.	Name	Championship	FA Cup	League Cup	Total
1	15	(England)	CF	Charlie Austin	10	0	1	11
2	4	(Wales)	CF	Hal Robson-Kanu	10	0	0	10
3	10	(Scotland)	RW	Matt Phillips	7	1	0	8
3	12	(Brazil)	RW	Matheus Pereira	8	0	0	8
3	29	(England)	LW	Grady Diangana	8	0	0	8
6	6	(Nigeria)	CB	Semi Ajayi	5	0	0	5
6	9	(Denmark)	CF	Kenneth Zohore	3	2	0	5
8	8	(England)	CM	Jake Livermore	3	0	0	3
8	7	(Croatia)	AM	Filip Krovinović	3	0	0	3
8	27	(Republic of Ireland)	CB	Dara O'Shea	3	0	0	3
8	47	(Republic of Ireland)	LW	Callum Robinson	3	0	0	3
12	2	(England)	RB	Darnell Furlong	2	0	0	2
12	5	(England)	CB	Kyle Bartley	2	0	0	2
12	13	(Poland)	AM	Kamil Grosicki	2	0	0	2
12	21	(England)	LM	Kyle Edwards	2	0	0	2
16	3	(England)	LB	Kieran Gibbs	1	0	0	1
16	14	(England)	LB	Conor Townsend	0	1	0	1
16	19	(Saint Kitts and Nevis)	CM	Romaine Sawyers	1	0	0	1
16	26	(Egypt)	CB	Ahmed Hegazi	1	0	0	1
16	36	(England)	RB	Nathan Ferguson	1	0	0	1
Total					72	4	1	76

=== Disciplinary record ===
As of 22 July 2020

Rank	No.	Nat.	Po.	Name	Championship			FA Cup			League Cup			Total		
Rank	No.	Nat.	Po.	Name	Booked	(yellow card) (yellow-red card)	Sent off (straight red)	Booked	(yellow card) (yellow-red card)	Sent off (straight red)	Booked	(yellow card) (yellow-red card)	Sent off (straight red)	Booked	(yellow card) (yellow-red card)	Sent off (straight red)
1	19	(Saint Kitts and Nevis)	CM	Romaine Sawyers	10	0	1	0	0	0	0	0	0	10	0	1
2	8	(England)	CM	Jake Livermore	10	0	0	0	0	0	0	0	0	10	0	0
3	5	(England)	CB	Kyle Bartley	8	0	0	0	0	0	0	0	0	8	0	0
3	6	(Nigeria)	CB	Semi Ajayi	6	0	0	0	1	0	0	0	0	6	1	0
5	36	(England)	RB	Nathan Ferguson	5	0	1	0	0	0	0	0	0	5	0	1
6	2	(England)	RB	Darnell Furlong	5	0	0	0	0	0	0	0	0	5	0	0
6	4	(Wales)	CF	Hal Robson-Kanu	5	0	0	0	0	0	0	0	0	5	0	0
6	10	(Scotland)	RW	Matt Phillips	5	0	0	0	0	0	0	0	0	5	0	0
6	12	(Brazil)	RW	Matheus Pereira	5	0	0	0	0	0	0	0	0	5	0	0
6	14	(England)	LB	Conor Townsend	4	0	0	1	0	0	0	0	0	5	0	0
6	15	(England)	CF	Charlie Austin	5	0	0	0	0	0	0	0	0	5	0	0
10	26	(Egypt)	CB	Ahmed Hegazi	2	1	0	0	0	0	0	0	0	2	1	0
10	27	(Republic of Ireland)	CB	Dara O'Shea	4	0	0	0	0	0	0	0	0	4	0	0
15	7	(Croatia)	AM	Filip Krovinović	2	0	0	0	0	0	0	0	0	2	0	0
15	21	(England)	LM	Kyle Edwards	2	0	0	0	0	0	0	0	0	2	0	0
15	29	(England)	LW	Grady Diangana	2	0	0	0	0	0	0	0	0	2	0	0
17	1	(England)	GK	Sam Johnstone	1	0	0	0	0	0	0	0	0	1	0	0
17	3	(England)	LB	Kieran Gibbs	1	0	0	0	0	0	0	0	0	1	0	0
17	16	(England)	CM	Rakeem Harper	0	0	0	1	0	0	0	0	0	1	0	0
17	47	(Republic of Ireland)	LW	Callum Robinson	1	0	0	0	0	0	0	0	0	1	0	0
Total					83	1	2	2	1	0	0	0	0	85	2	2
