= Romaine Sawyers =

Footballer (born 1991)

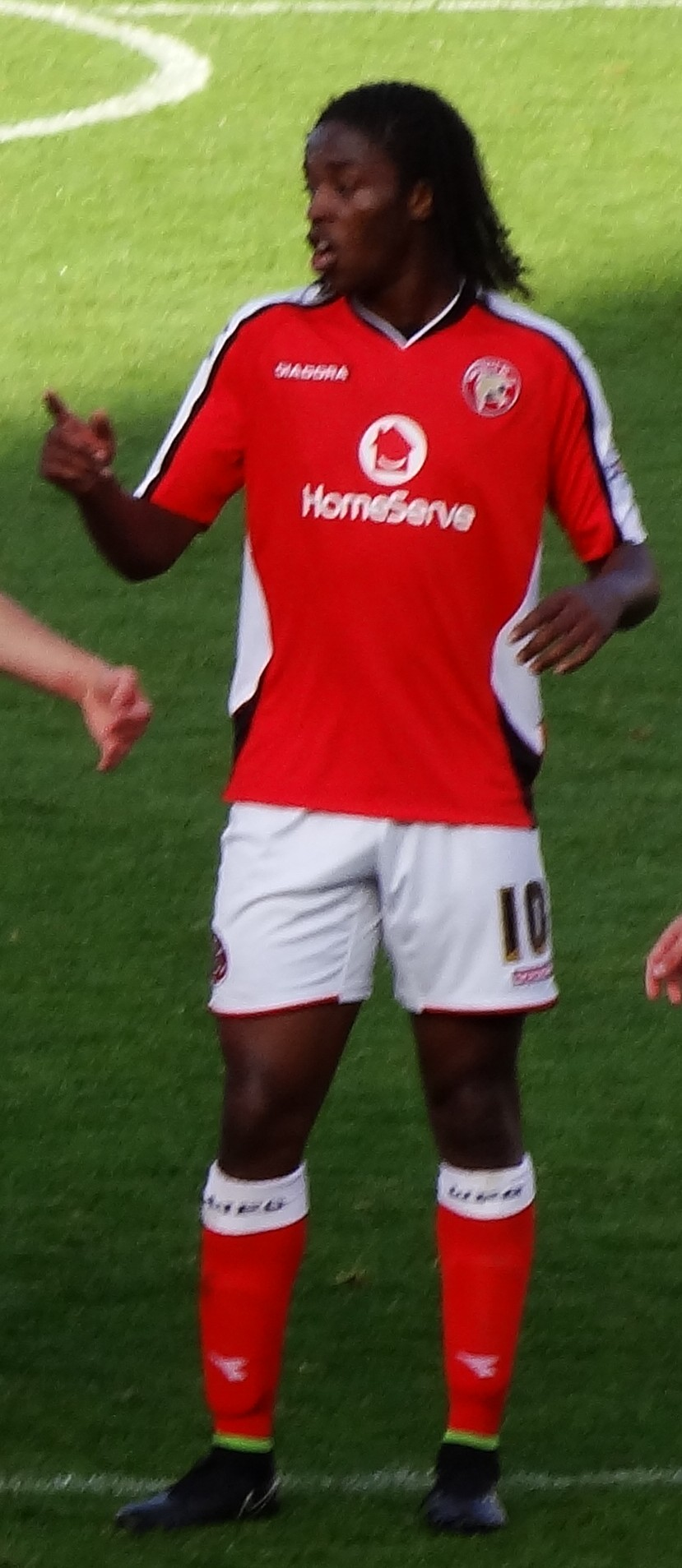
- Sawyers playing for Walsall in 2014.

Personal information
- Full name: Romaine Theodore Sawyers
- Date of birth: 2 November 1991 (age 35)
- Place of birth: Birmingham, England
- Height: 5 ft 9 in (1.75 m)
- Position: Midfielder

Youth career
- 2004–2009: West Bromwich Albion

Senior career*
Years	Team	Apps	(Gls)
2009–2013	West Bromwich Albion	0	(0)
2011	→ Port Vale (loan)	1	(0)
2012	→ Shrewsbury Town (loan)	7	(0)
2013	→ Walsall (loan)	4	(0)
2013–2016	Walsall	132	(16)
2016–2019	Brentford	127	(6)
2019–2022	West Bromwich Albion	61	(1)
2021–2022	→ Stoke City (loan)	25	(2)
2022–2024	Cardiff City	39	(3)
2024–2025	AFC Wimbledon	4	(1)
2025	Bristol Rovers	13	(1)
Total		417	(30)

International career
2011–2012	Saint Kitts and Nevis U23	3	(4)
2012–2026	Saint Kitts and Nevis	58	(8)
- * Club domestic league appearances and goals

Romaine Theodore Sawyers (born 2 November 1991) is a former professional footballer who played as a midfielder. Born in England, he represented the Saint Kitts and Nevis national team. He scored 36 goals in 463 league and cup games in a 16-year professional career, and also scored eight goals in 57 international games.

A West Bromwich Albion academy graduate, he had brief spells on loan at Port Vale, Shrewsbury Town and Walsall. He signed with Walsall in July 2013, following his release from West Brom. He played on the losing side in the 2015 final of the Football League Trophy. He was named in League One's PFA Team of the Year for his 2015–16 season performances. He joined Brentford in July 2016 and went on to serve as club captain before he returned to West Bromwich Albion for an undisclosed fee in July 2019. He helped the club to win promotion out of the Championship at the end of the 2019–20 season and was also named in the PFA Team of the Year. West Brom were relegated the following year, and he was loaned out to Stoke City for the 2021–22 season. He signed with Cardiff City in July 2022 and spent two seasons with the club. He joined AFC Wimbledon on a short-term deal in December 2024 and moved on to Bristol Rovers a month later.

== Early life ==
Sawyers was raised by Diane, a single mother who raised foster children and did many hours of community work in Birmingham. She remained a big influence on her son, who went on to work closely with the community development teams at his football clubs, as well as with the charity Kick It Out. He grew up supporting Arsenal and was a big fan of Thierry Henry.

== Club career ==
=== West Bromwich Albion ===
Sawyers first made the West Bromwich Albion substitute bench for the final game of the 2008–09 season. He then won his first professional contract with the club. However, he spent most of the 2009–10 season nursing a knee injury. On 21 January 2011, he joined Jim Gannon's Port Vale on a one-month loan, along with Kayleden Brown. He made his debut for the League Two club two days later, in a 1–0 defeat to Cheltenham Town at Vale Park, replacing Adam Yates. However, this was to be his only game for the club, as the pair returned to The Hawthorns after the loan spell ended with Sawyers having made no further first-team appearances.

On 27 January 2012, he joined Graham Turner's League Two Shrewsbury Town on a one-month loan, and the following day he was named as an unused substitute for the 2–0 win at Hereford United. He made his first league start against Torquay United at Plainmoor on 11 February. On 25 February, it was announced his loan had been extended until the end of the 2011–12 season. In total he made two starts and five substitute appearances for Shrewsbury.

=== Walsall ===
Sawyers joined League One club Walsall on loan in March 2013; manager Dean Smith said that "He's a talented lad who can play-off the front-man... I know that Albion rate him highly, so it's good to have him on board." He made four substitute appearances for the club. West Brom released him in June 2013. Following his release from West Brom, Sawyers signed a permanent one-year deal at Walsall in July 2013; Dean Smith stated that he saw potential and an excellent attitude in the player despite his limited playing time on loan. On 17 August 2013, he marked his first senior start for Walsall with his first goal from 25 yards (23 m) in a 1–1 draw with Notts County at the Bescot Stadium. He finished the 2013–14 season with seven goals in 49 appearances. He signed a new two-year deal with the club.

On 13 September 2014, he was described as a "shining light throughout" in a 3–1 home win over Preston North End, earning a place on the Football League team of the week. He played in the 2015 final of the Football League Trophy, a 2–0 defeat to Bristol City, which was Walsall's first appearance at Wembley Stadium. In total he scored five goals in 51 appearances in the 2014–15 season, and was praised by manager Smith despite being criticised by some supporters. He won a place on the Football League team of the week after scoring a brace – including a "25-yard rocket into the top corner of the net" – in a 4–0 triumph at Blackpool on 29 August 2015. He was named in League One's PFA Team of the Year for his performances in the 2015–16 season, alongside teammate Rico Henry. He was also nominated for the PFA League One 'Player of the Year', and finished as runner-up to Gillingham's Bradley Dack. He rejected the club's offer a new contract and departed as a free agent at the end of the season.

=== Brentford ===
On 1 July 2016, Sawyers signed with Championship club Brentford in a move that reunited him with former Walsall boss Dean Smith. He made his debut for the "Bees" in a 2–1 away defeat to Huddersfield Town on the opening day of the 2016–17 season. He scored his first goal for Brentford in a 2–0 win over West London derby rivals Queens Park Rangers on 28 October. He ended the 2016–17 campaign with three goals in 45 matches, helping Brentford to a tenth-place finish as the key link between defence and attack. He scored five goals and contributed five assists in 44 appearances across the 2017–18 season as Brentford finished in ninth position, and was described as "one of the standout players at Griffin Park this season with his touch and passing range impressing many". He was voted Players' Player of the Year by the Brentford squad and was also named as Community Player of the Year.

He was reported to be a transfer target of West Bromwich Albion manager Darren Moore in June 2018. Soon after taking charge at Brentford, new manager Thomas Frank named Sawyers as the new club captain in November 2018. Frank moved Sawyers further down the pitch as part of two central midfielders with Kamohelo Mokotjo rather than as one of three. He made 46 appearances during the 2018–19 season and was linked with a move to Aston Villa in the summer.

=== Return to West Bromwich Albion ===
On 27 July 2019, Sawyers returned to West Bromwich Albion, signing a three-year contract after being bought for an undisclosed fee (reported to be £2.9 million); Sawyers stated that "this is the team that I have always wanted to play for". Manager Slaven Bilić said that "we targeted him as a player who will raise the quality in our midfield". He chose to wear the #19 shirt in homage to former midfielder Jason Koumas. On 22 February 2020, he was sent off after putting his hand to the throat of former Walsall teammate Jamie Paterson during a 3–0 win at Bristol City. During break in play due to the COVID-19 pandemic in England, FourFourTwo magazine listed Sawyers as the ninth best player in the EFL. He ended the 2019–20 season with one goal in 43 appearances as the "Baggies" secured the Championship's second automatic promotion place. He was also named in the Championship's PFA Team of the Year.

On 29 December 2020, he scored what The Guardian's Paul Doyle described as a "slapstick own goal" in a 5–0 defeat to Leeds United at The Hawthorns. Sawyers took to Twitter to say that "I take full responsibility for setting the tone for what went on to be a difficult night for us all to stomach!" Sawyers barely featured in the second half of the 2020–21 season as the club suffered relegation under the stewardship of Sam Allardyce.

==== Loan to Stoke City ====
On 20 August 2021, Sawyers joined Championship rivals Stoke City on loan for the 2021–22 season. Manager Michael O'Neill stated that "we didn't anticipate that Romaine would become available" but acted quickly to sign Sawyers after he had fallen behind Jake Livermore and Alex Mowatt in the pecking order at West Brom. Sawyers made 29 appearances for Stoke, scoring three goals during his loan spell which was disrupted due to a leg injury which caused him to miss two months.

=== Cardiff City ===
On 6 July 2022, Sawyers joined Cardiff City on a two-year deal following his release from West Brom, with "Bluebirds" manager Steve Morison noting that "we can make five substitutions this season, and that will come into our thinking, so it's worth having those extra bodies in every position we can". He scored three goals from 39 games in the 2022–23 campaign, including the goal that gave new boss Sabri Lamouchi his first win at the Cardiff City Stadium against Reading on 17 February. However, he was told to look for a new club by new manager Erol Bulut in August 2023. He remained at the club and featured in two league and four cup games in the first half of the 2023–24 season before leaving upon the expiry of his contract.

=== AFC Wimbledon ===
On 5 December 2024, Sawyers joined League Two club AFC Wimbledon on a one-month contract. He said that he aimed to "utilise my experience to help the boys get some results over the busy Christmas period", with manager Johnnie Jackson reiterating that it was a short-term solution to the club's injury crisis. He made his first start for Wimbledon on 30 December, contributing to a 1–0 win over Gillingham that took the Dons into the automatic promotion places. He scored his first goal for the Dons in his fifth and final appearance, a 2–1 win at Newport County on 2 January. He departed Plough Lane four days later following the expiry of his contract.

=== Bristol Rovers ===
On 8 January 2025, Sawyers joined League One side Bristol Rovers on a short-term contract until the end of the 2024–25 season after having been made to feel "very wanted" by director of football George Friend and head coach Iñigo Calderón. Following relegation, he was released at the end of his short-term contract. He trained with Walsall during the 2025–26 season to maintain fitness, with head coach Mat Sadler ruling out signing the player in November.

== International career ==
Sawyers represented Saint Kitts and Nevis national under-23 football team in the second round of the Caribbean Football Union's qualifying phase for the 2012 CONCACAF Men's Olympic Qualifying Championship. In the three games the team played, he scored four goals. He was called up to the full team for the qualification for the 2012 Caribbean Cup. He scored a goal and claimed an assist on his debut in a 2–0 win over Anguilla at the Warner Park Sporting Complex in Basseterre.

== Style of play ==
Sawyers has a languid style of play, which can make him appear lazy at times despite statistics indicating a relatively high work rate. He can play as an attacking midfielder, playmaker or as a central midfielder. He played most his career as a 'number 10' under his former manager Dean Smith who managed him at Walsall and Brentford, before being converted into a central midfielder under Manager Thomas Frank at Brentford who also made him captain due to his leadership qualities. Sawyers is known for his ability to dictate games from midfield, range of passing, and ability to carry out successful difficult passes and help his teammates start attacks.

== Personal life ==
In January 2021, a 49-year-old man from Kingswinford was arrested after a racist message was sent to Sawyers on social media during West Brom's loss to Manchester City. In September 2021, the man was jailed for eight weeks.

== Career statistics ==
=== Club ===
Appearances and goals by club, season and competition
Club	Season	League			FA Cup		EFL Cup		Other		Total	
Club	Season	Division	Apps	Goals	Apps	Goals	Apps	Goals	Apps	Goals	Apps	Goals
West Bromwich Albion	2008–09	Premier League	0	0	0	0	0	0	—		0	0
Port Vale (loan)	2010–11	League Two	1	0	—		—		—		1	0
Shrewsbury Town (loan)	2011–12	League Two	7	0	—		—		—		7	0
Walsall (loan)	2012–13	League One	4	0	—		—		—		4	0
Walsall	2013–14	League One	44	6	2	1	2	0	1 (Note: Appearance(s) in Football League Trophy)	0	49	7
Walsall	2014–15	League One	42	4	2	0	2	0	5	1	51	5
Walsall	2015–16	League One	46	6	5	0	3	1	3 (Note: One appearance in Football League Trophy, two in League One play-offs)	0	57	7
Walsall	Total		136	16	9	1	7	1	9	1	161	19
Brentford	2016–17	Championship	43	2	2	1	0	0	—		45	3
Brentford	2017–18	Championship	42	4	0	0	2	1	—		44	5
Brentford	2018–19	Championship	42	0	3	0	1	0	—		46	0
Brentford	Total		127	6	5	1	3	1	—		135	8
West Bromwich Albion	2019–20	Championship	42	1	0	0	1	0	—		43	1
West Bromwich Albion	2020–21	Premier League	19	0	1	0	1	0	—		21	0
West Bromwich Albion	2021–22	Championship	0	0	0	0	0	0	—		0	0
West Bromwich Albion	Total		61	1	1	0	2	0	—		64	1
Stoke City (loan)	2021–22	Championship	25	2	1	0	3	1	—		29	3
Cardiff City	2022–23	Championship	37	3	2	0	0	0	—		39	3
Cardiff City	2023–24	Championship	2	0	1	0	3	0	—		6	0
Cardiff City	Total		39	3	3	0	3	0	—		45	3
AFC Wimbledon	2024–25	League Two	4	1	—		—		1 (Note: Appearance in EFL Trophy)	0	5	1
Bristol Rovers	2024–25	League One	13	1	1	0	—		—		14	1
Career total			417	30	20	2	18	3	10	1	465	36

=== International ===
As of match played 13 November 2026

Appearances and goals by national team and year
National team	Year	Apps	Goals
Saint Kitts and Nevis	2012	3	1
Saint Kitts and Nevis	2014	6	1
Saint Kitts and Nevis	2015	5	1
Saint Kitts and Nevis	2016	5	1
Saint Kitts and Nevis	2017	2	0
Saint Kitts and Nevis	2018	4	0
Saint Kitts and Nevis	2019	1	0
Saint Kitts and Nevis	2021	4	1
Saint Kitts and Nevis	2022	1	0
Saint Kitts and Nevis	2023	12	1
Saint Kitts and Nevis	2024	6	1
Saint Kitts and Nevis	2025	2	1
Saint Kitts and Nevis	2026	7	0
Total		58	8

Scores and results list Saint Kitts and Nevis' goal tally first, score column indicates score after each Sawyers goal.

List of international goals scored by Romaine Sawyers
No.	Date	Venue	Opponent	Score	Result	Competition
1	10 October 2012	Warner Park, Basseterre, Saint Kitts and Nevis	Anguilla	1–0	2–0	2012 Caribbean Cup qualification
2	5 September 2014	Warner Park, Basseterre, Saint Kitts and Nevis	Dominica	2–0	5–0	2014 Caribbean Cup qualification
3	11 June 2015	Warner Park, Basseterre, Saint Kitts and Nevis	El Salvador	2–1	2–2	2018 FIFA World Cup qualification
4	26 March 2016	Trinidad Stadium, Oranjestad, Aruba	Aruba	2–0	2–0	2017 Caribbean Cup qualification
5	4 June 2021	Warner Park, Basseterre, Saint Kitts and Nevis	Guyana	3–0	3–0	2022 FIFA World Cup qualification
6	23 March 2023	Raymond E. Guishard Technical Centre, The Valley, Anguilla	Saint Martin	2–1	3–1	2022–23 CONCACAF Nations League C
7	14 November 2024	Warner Park, Basseterre, Saint Kitts and Nevis	Cuba	2–1	2–1	2025 CONCACAF Gold Cup qualification play-in
8	10 June 2025	Warner Park, Basseterre, Saint Kitts and Nevis	Grenada	2–3	2–3	2026 FIFA World Cup qualification

== Honours ==
Walsall

- Football League Trophy runner-up: 2014–15

West Bromwich Albion

- EFL Championship second-place promotion: 2019–20

Individual

- PFA Team of the Year: 2015–16 League One
- Brentford Players Player of the Year: 2017–18
- Brentford Community Player of the Year: 2017–18
- PFA Team of the Year: 2019–20 Championship
