= Saul Shotton =

English footballer

Personal information
- Full name: Saul Shotton
- Date of birth: 10 November 2000 (age 25)
- Place of birth: Stoke-on-Trent, England
- Height: 1.92 m (6 ft 4 in)
- Positions: Defender; midfielder

Team information
- Current team: Kidsgrove Athletic

Youth career
- –2017: Stoke City
- 2017–2018: Bury

Senior career*
Years	Team	Apps	(Gls)
2017–2019	Bury	4	(0)
2019–2022	West Bromwich Albion	0	(0)
2020–2021	→ Woking (loan)	15	(0)
2021–2022	→ Telford United (loan)	8	(0)
2022	Hanley Town		
2022–2023	Lambourne	15	(10)
2022–2023	Florence Reserves	15	(13)
2023	Florence	5	(6)
2023–2024	Hanley Town	23	(0)
2024–	Kidsgrove Athletic	10	(0)
- * Club domestic league appearances and goals as of 19:05, 26 October 2024 (UTC)

Saul Shotton (born 10 November 2000) is an English professional footballer who plays for Northern Premier League Division One West club Kidsgrove Athletic.

== Club career ==
=== Bury ===
Born in Stoke-on-Trent, Shotton started his career with Stoke City prior to his move to Bury in 2017. Having progressed through the club's youth structure, he made his first team debut in September 2018. On 19 September 2017, he made his debut for Bury in their EFL Trophy defeat to Rochdale, featuring for the entire 90 minutes in the 4–0 loss. Following this, Shotton was an unused substitute on several occasions before making his league debut in April 2018, in a 3–3 draw with Doncaster Rovers.

Ahead of the forthcoming 2018–19 campaign, Shotton, along with two fellow graduates, signed their first professional contracts. To March 2019, he has not played for the first team in 2018–19 but is an active member of the club's under-18 team.

=== West Bromwich Albion ===
He left the club after they were expelled from the Football League in August 2019, signing for West Bromwich Albion in September 2019. On 5 January 2020, Shotton made his debut for the club in their third round FA Cup tie against Charlton Athletic, replacing Rekeem Harper in the 95th minute during the 1–0 away victory.

On 2 October 2020, Shotton signed for National League side Woking on loan until January 2021. A day later, he made his debut for the club, playing the full 90 minutes in their 2020–21 National League opener against Solihull Moors, which resulted in a 2–1 victory for The Cards. Shotton made 18 appearances in all competitions for Woking, before returning to West Bromwich Albion in January 2021.

During the 2021–22 campaign, Shotton made his first West Bromwich Albion start during an EFL Cup second round tie against Premier League side, Arsenal, playing the full 90 in the 6–0 defeat.

On 29 October 2021, Shotton joined National League North side, AFC Telford United on a three-month loan.

=== Non-league ===
Shotton was released by West Bromwich Albion in the summer of 2022 when his contract expired and he subsequently dropped back into non-league permanently when he signed for newly-promoted Northern Premier League West Division side Hanley Town, joining up to play with his cousin Ryan. He joined Hanley Town for a second time on 31 August 2023.

Shotton joined Kidsgrove Athletic in June 2024.

== Personal life ==
He is the cousin of Ryan Shotton.

== Career statistics ==
As of match played 7 October 2023

Appearances and goals by club, season and competition
Club	Season	League			FA Cup		League Cup		Other		Total	
Club	Season	Division	Apps	Goals	Apps	Goals	Apps	Goals	Apps	Goals	Apps	Goals
Bury	2017–18	League One	4	0	0	0	0	0	2 (Note: Appearances in EFL Trophy.)	0	6	0
Bury	2018–19	League Two	0	0	0	0	0	0	0	0	0	0
Bury	Total		4	0	0	0	0	0	2	0	6	0
West Bromwich Albion	2019–20	Championship	0	0	1	0	0	0	—		1	0
West Bromwich Albion	2020–21	Premier League	0	0	—		0	0	—		0	0
West Bromwich Albion	2021–22	Championship	0	0	0	0	1	0	—		1	0
West Bromwich Albion	Total		0	0	1	0	1	0	—		2	0
Woking (loan)	2020–21	National League	15	0	2	0	—		1 (Note: Appearances in FA Trophy.)	0	18	0
AFC Telford United (loan)	2021–22	National League North	8	0	—		—		1	0	9	0
Florence Reserves	2022–23	SCSL Two North	15	13	—		—		11 (Note: Two appearances in SCSL Leek Cup) (Note: Four appearances and three goals in SCSL Chairman's Challenge Cup) (Note: Four appearances and one goal in SCSL Macron League) (Note: Appearance in SCSL Div 2 Divisional Final)	4	26	17
Florence FC	2023–24	SCSL One	5	6	—		—		0	0	5	6
Hanley Town	2023–24	Northern Premier League Division One West	4	0	1	0	—		3	0	8	0
Career total			51	19	4	0	1	0	18	4	74	23
