= Conor Gallagher =

English footballer (born 2000)

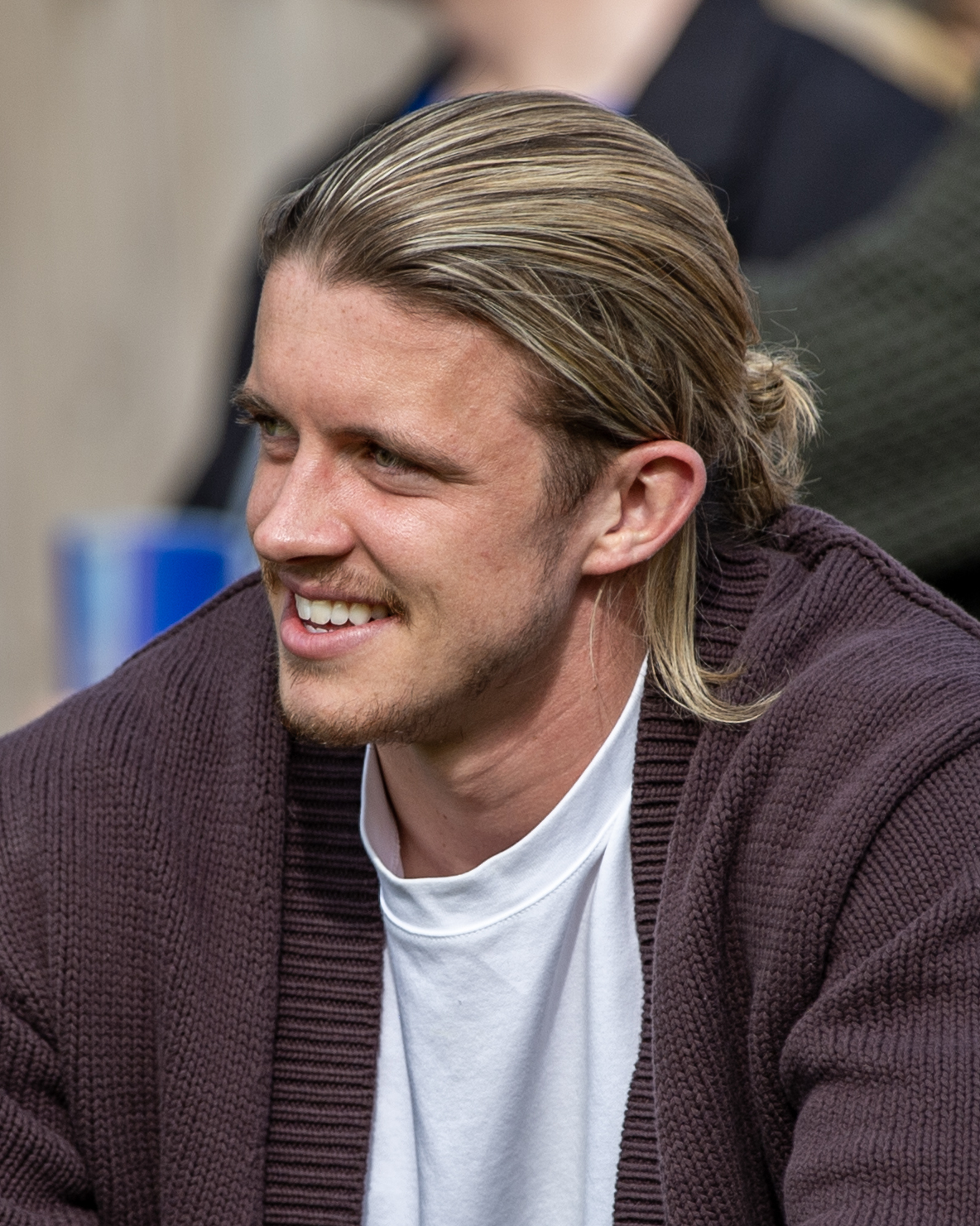
- Gallagher in 2024

Personal information
- Full name: Conor John Gallagher
- Date of birth: 6 February 2000 (age 26)
- Place of birth: Epsom, Surrey, England
- Height: 6 ft 0 in (1.82 m)
- Position: Midfielder

Team information
- Current team: Tottenham Hotspur
- Number: 8

Youth career
- Bookham Colts
- Leatherhead Predators
- Epsom Eagles
- 2006–2019: Chelsea

Senior career*
Years	Team	Apps	(Gls)
2019–2024	Chelsea	72	(8)
2019–2020	→ Charlton Athletic (loan)	26	(6)
2020	→ Swansea City (loan)	19	(0)
2020–2021	→ West Bromwich Albion (loan)	30	(2)
2021–2022	→ Crystal Palace (loan)	34	(8)
2024–2026	Atlético Madrid	51	(5)
2026–	Tottenham Hotspur	25	(2)

International career^{‡}
2017–2018	England U17	4	(0)
2018	England U18	6	(0)
2018–2019	England U19	9	(2)
2019	England U20	4	(0)
2019–2022	England U21	15	(3)
2021–	England	22	(1)
Medal record
Men's football
Representing England
UEFA European Championship
Runner-up	2024 Germany	Team
FIFA U-17 World Cup
Winner	2017 India	U-17 Team
- * Club domestic league appearances and goals as of 08:37, 22 November 2026 (UTC) ‡ National team caps and goals as of 23:21, 10 June 2025 (UTC)

Conor John Gallagher (born 6 February 2000) is an English professional footballer who plays as a midfielder for Premier League club Tottenham Hotspur and the England national team.

Beginning his career with Chelsea, Gallagher spent time on loan at EFL Championship clubs Charlton Athletic, Swansea City, and Premier League clubs West Bromwich Albion and Crystal Palace, between 2019 and 2022. At Crystal Palace, Gallagher was named the club's Player of the Year for the 2021–22 season. He subsequently made his first-team debut at Chelsea in the following campaign, spending two seasons with the first team before joining Atlético Madrid in 2024. He returned to England after 18 months, signing with Tottenham Hotspur in January 2026.

After representing England at various youth levels, Gallagher made his debut for the senior national team in November 2021. He was a member of England's squad at both the 2022 FIFA World Cup and UEFA Euro 2024.

== Early and personal life ==
Gallagher was born in Epsom, Surrey to Lee and Samantha Gallagher and is the youngest of their four sons. He grew up in Great Bookham and attended Howard of Effingham School. His older brothers, Jake, Josh and Dan, are footballers at non-League level. Gallagher's family are Chelsea fans, and he lived a ten-minute drive from their training ground in Stoke d'Abernon. He is of Irish descent through his father, and Scottish descent through his maternal grandfather.

In June 2026, Gallagher announced his engagement to Aine May.

== Club career ==
=== Chelsea ===
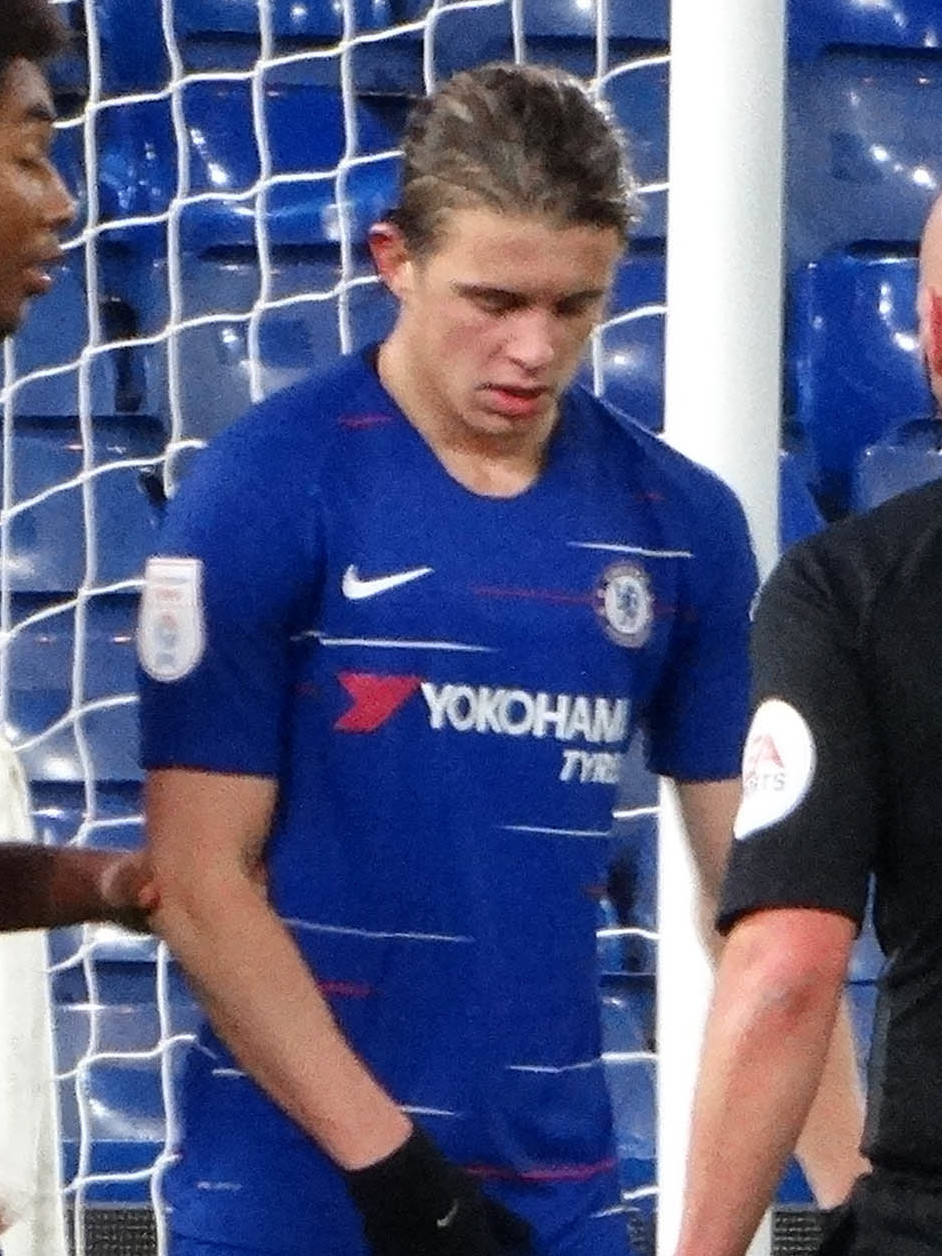
Gallagher with Chelsea in 2018

==== Early career ====
After playing for grassroots teams Bookham Colts, Leatherhead Predators and Epsom Eagles, Gallagher joined Chelsea at the age of six. In October 2018, he signed a new contract with Chelsea, contracting him to the club until June 2021. He had minor heart surgery that year. In May 2019, he was an unused substitute in the 2019 UEFA Europa League final, collecting a winner's medal. He was awarded Chelsea's Academy Player of the Year for the 2018–19 season.

==== 2019–20 season: Loans to Charlton Athletic and Swansea City ====
In August 2019, Gallagher signed a new three-year contract with Chelsea and moved on loan to Championship club Charlton Athletic. After his first month with Charlton, in which he scored three goals in six matches, he won the EFL Young Player of the Month award for August. On 14 January 2020, Gallagher was recalled by Chelsea.

On 15 January 2020, the day after leaving Charlton, Gallagher joined Championship club Swansea City on loan for the rest of the 2019–20 season. During his time in South Wales, Gallagher was part of the Swansea team that reached the semi-finals of the Championship play-off, where they lost 3–2 to Brentford on aggregate. He later said that his time at Swansea allowed him to be more creative as a player.

==== 2020–21 season: Loan to West Bromwich Albion ====
On 17 September 2020, Gallagher signed a new five-year contract with Chelsea, and joined fellow Premier League club West Bromwich Albion on loan for the 2020–21 season. On 28 November, Gallagher scored his first Premier League goal and his first goal for West Brom in a 1–0 home league win over Sheffield United. His only other goal for the club came in a 5–1 home defeat to future club Crystal Palace on 6 December.

Gallagher was named Albion's Young Player of the Season as the club finished 19th in the Premier League and were relegated to the Championship.

==== 2021–22 season: Loan to Crystal Palace ====
In July 2021, Gallagher joined Premier League club Crystal Palace on loan for the 2021–22 season. He scored two goals in a 2–2 draw with West Ham United on 28 August 2021, his first goals for Palace. In November, Gallagher was subjected to homophobic chants from a group of Leeds United fans; the club issued a statement which condemned this. By the start of December, he had six goals and three assists for Crystal Palace, the most of any Premier League player aged 21 or under. On 15 April 2022, he was prevented by parent club Chelsea from playing against them in the FA Cup semi-final; Chelsea manager Thomas Tuchel apologised for doing so. Chelsea went on to defeat Palace 2–0.

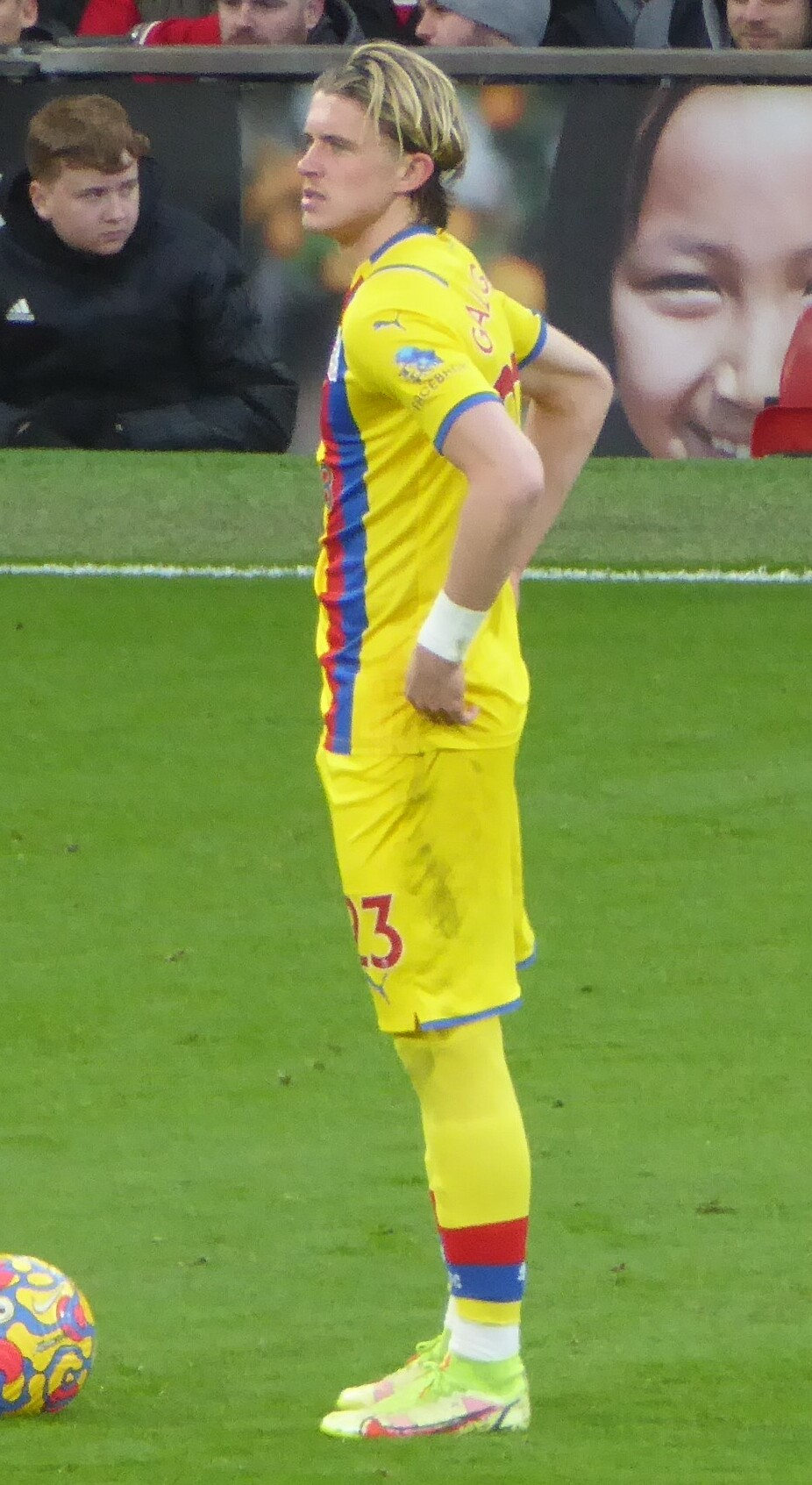
Gallagher playing for Crystal Palace in 2021

During his season with Palace, Gallagher was described by The Daily Telegraph as "one of the Premier League's most vibrant talents" and "a key player for Patrick Vieira", who was "thriving in his box-to-box role". For his performances with the club, he was later named Crystal Palace's Player of the Season.

==== 2022–23 season: Return to Chelsea ====
In July 2022, ahead of the 2022–23 season, Gallagher said he was determined to make a first-team breakthrough at Chelsea.

On 6 August 2022, he made his Chelsea debut as a substitute in a 1–0 away win against Everton in the Premier League. He made his first start for the club in a 3–0 away loss to Leeds United on 21 August. In the following match, a 2–1 win over Leicester City at Stamford Bridge on 27 August, he received his first career red card for two bookable offences. On 14 September, he made his UEFA Champions League debut as an 81st minute substitute for Mateo Kovačić in a 1–1 draw with RB Salzburg in the group stage. On 1 October, Gallagher scored his first goal for Chelsea, a 90th-minute winner in a 2–1 away victory over his former club, Crystal Palace.

In 2023, Gallagher scored further goals against Brighton & Hove Albion in April and Bournemouth in May to end his first season as a Chelsea first team player with three goals in 45 appearances. His goal against Crystal Palace was later awarded Chelsea's Goal of the Season on 28 May.

==== 2023–24 season: Captaincy and final season ====
Ahead of the 2023–24 season, Chelsea rejected a bid for Gallagher from West Ham United.

On 31 August 2023, Gallagher captained Chelsea for the first time, in a 2–1 EFL Cup victory over Wimbledon. He captained the team for the first time in a league match on 17 September as Chelsea drew 0–0 with Bournemouth. Gallagher went on to regularly serve as captain throughout the season amidst injuries to regular captain Reece James and vice-captain Ben Chilwell.

On 7 February 2024, he scored his first goal of the season in an FA Cup fourth round replay win at Aston Villa. In the following match, he scored his first two Premier League goals of the season in a 3–1 away victory over his former club Crystal Palace on 12 February. On 25 February, he was in Chelsea's starting line-up for the 2024 EFL Cup final against Liverpool at Wembley. He played the full 90 minutes of regular time and another seven minutes of extra time before being substituted for Noni Madueke in the team's eventual 1–0 loss. He scored his first home goal of the season in the fifth minute of a 4–3 win over Manchester United on 4 April.

At the end of the 2023–24 season, it was reported that Gallagher could leave Chelsea. Ahead of Euro 2024, Gallagher insisted he was focusing on the tournament rather than his club future. In July 2024, Chelsea entered into talks with Spanish club Atlético Madrid regarding a potential transfer, and later accepted a transfer offer. After being told he would not be a regular starter under new Chelsea manager Enzo Maresca, he later agreed to the move.

The transfer later stalled, and Gallagher began training away from Chelsea's first team. However, later that month, the potential transfer was back on, with João Félix moving in the other direction as part of the deal.

=== Atlético Madrid ===
On 21 August 2024, Atlético Madrid announced that they had signed Gallagher on a five-year contract. The transfer fee was reported by The Guardian to be in the region of £34 million. The transfer was met with mixed reactions from Chelsea fans.

==== 2024–25 season ====
Gallagher made his official debut for Atlético as a 58th-minute substitute for Rodrigo Riquelme in the team's 2024–25 La Liga season opener against Girona at the Estadio Metropolitano on 25 August. He scored the opening goal in a 3–0 win over Valencia on 15 September, becoming the first Englishman to score a league goal for the club. Seven days later, he scored his second La Liga goal in a 1–1 draw with Rayo Vallecano. His early performances for Atlético were praised, with the BBC describing him as "an unqualified success so far".

On 12 March 2025, Gallagher scored his first UEFA Champions League goal in the opening minute of the second leg of the Round of 16 matchup against Real Madrid to level the aggregate score at 2–2. Atlético went on to lose the tie in a penalty shootout after there were no further goals during the match.

In June 2025, Gallagher was part of the Atlético Madrid squad that competed at the 2025 FIFA Club World Cup in the United States. He appeared in all three matches as Atleti were eliminated at the group stage, losing 4–0 to Paris Saint-Germain and beating Seattle Sounders and Botafogo 3–1 and 1–0 respectively.

==== 2025–26 season ====
In his second season at Atlético, Gallagher was primarily used as a substitute by coach Diego Simeone. Despite his lack of starting opportunities, Gallagher was one of only two players to appear in all 27 of Atleti's matches in 2025–26 prior to his departure from the club.

His first goal of the season came in a 1–1 draw against Mallorca on matchday 5, eleven minutes after appearing as a substitute for Pablo Barrios. On 4 November 2025, he scored the second goal of a 3–1 win over Union Saint-Gilloise in the UEFA Champions League. On 21 December, he scored his second La Liga goal of the season, and third in all competitions, after replacing the injured Nicolás González in a 3–0 win away at Girona.

Gallagher's final appearance for Atleti came in the 2–1 Supercopa de España semi-final loss to city rivals Real Madrid. He played the first 45 minutes in the match played in Jeddah, Saudi Arabia on 8 January 2026.

=== Tottenham Hotspur ===
==== 2025–26 season ====
In January 2026, Gallagher was linked with a transfer to either Aston Villa or Tottenham Hotspur. On 14 January 2026, Gallagher signed with Tottenham Hotspur for a reported fee of £35 million. He described the decision to sign as being "very easy".

Manager Thomas Frank was sacked shortly after signing Gallagher, and Gallagher found his playing time limited under manager Igor Tudor. His fortunes changed with the arrival of Roberto De Zerbi, who handed Gallagher a starting place in every match until the end of the season. On 3 May 2026, Gallagher scored his first goal for Tottenham Hotspur in a 2–1 away victory over Aston Villa.

Following the end of the season, in which Tottenham avoided relegation on the final day, Gallagher praised new manager De Zerbi, saying "thank God the new gaffer came in because he was the reason it turned around for the team and for me."

== International career ==
Gallagher's family heritage meant he was eligible to play for England, Scotland or the Republic of Ireland until he made a competitive appearance for any at senior level. He represented England at under-17, under-18, under-19 and under-20 youth levels, winning the 2017 FIFA U-17 World Cup in India.

On 8 October 2019, Gallagher received his first call up to the England U21 squad and made his debut on 11 October as a substitute during a 2–2 draw against Slovenia in Maribor.

On 14 November 2021, he received his first call-up to the England senior squad. The following day, he earned his first cap, coming on as a half-time substitute in England's 10–0 win over San Marino. He made his first start in a 2–1 friendly win over Switzerland on 26 March 2022, assisting a goal for Luke Shaw.

In November 2022, he was named in England's squad for the 2022 FIFA World Cup in Qatar where he was an unused substitute in all five of the team's matches.

In June 2024, he was named in England's 26-man squad for UEFA Euro 2024. In the team's opening match against Serbia, he made his tournament debut as a 69th minute substitute for Trent Alexander-Arnold, as England won 1–0 to go top of Group C. After replacing Alexander-Arnold in the 54th minute of the second match against Denmark, Gallagher made his first start of the tournament in the 0–0 draw with Slovenia, playing the first half before being substituted for Kobbie Mainoo at half time. He went on to make substitute appearances against Slovakia in the round of 16 and the Netherlands in the semi-final, as England finished as runner-up for the second consecutive UEFA European Championship.

Gallagher scored his first international goal on 17 November 2024 during a 5–0 UEFA Nations League victory against the Republic of Ireland.

== Style of play ==
Gallagher has said his "best position is as a box-to-box midfielder [...] I can play deeper and I can play attacking as well", and was described by Lee Bowyer, his manager at Charlton at the time, as "an all-round midfielder. His work-rate is unreal, he puts his foot in for tackles and he can also see a pass". Patrick Vieira likened Gallagher's style of play to that of former players Ray Parlour and Frank Lampard, who was Gallagher's idol while he was growing up.

== Career statistics ==
=== Club ===
As of match played 21 November 2026

Appearances and goals by club, season and competition
Club	Season	League			National cup (Note: Includes FA Cup, Copa del Rey)		League cup (Note: Includes EFL Cup)		Europe		Other		Total	
Club	Season	Division	Apps	Goals	Apps	Goals	Apps	Goals	Apps	Goals	Apps	Goals	Apps	Goals
Chelsea U23	2018–19	—			—		—		—		4 (Note: Appearances in EFL Trophy)	0	4	0
Chelsea	2019–20	Premier League	0	0	0	0	0	0	0	0	0	0	0	0
Chelsea	2020–21	Premier League	0	0	0	0	0	0	0	0	—		0	0
Chelsea	2021–22	Premier League	0	0	0	0	0	0	0	0	0	0	0	0
Chelsea	2022–23	Premier League	35	3	1	0	1	0	8 (Note: Appearances in UEFA Champions League)	0	—		45	3
Chelsea	2023–24	Premier League	37	5	6	2	7	0	—		—		50	7
Chelsea	Total		72	8	7	2	8	0	8	0	0	0	95	10
Charlton Athletic (loan)	2019–20	Championship	26	6	0	0	0	0	—		—		26	6
Swansea City (loan)	2019–20	Championship	19	0	—		—		—		2 (Note: Appearances in Championship play-offs)	0	21	0
West Bromwich Albion (loan)	2020–21	Premier League	30	2	1	0	1	0	—		—		32	2
Crystal Palace (loan)	2021–22	Premier League	34	8	4	0	1	0	—		—		39	8
Atlético Madrid	2024–25	La Liga	32	3	6	0	—		9	1	3 (Note: Appearances in FIFA Club World Cup)	0	50	4
Atlético Madrid	2025–26	La Liga	19	2	1	0	—		6	1	1 (Note: Appearance in Supercopa de España)	0	27	3
Atlético Madrid	Total		51	5	7	0	0	0	15	2	4	0	77	7
Tottenham Hotspur	2025–26	Premier League	16	1	—		—		2	0	—		18	1
Tottenham Hotspur	2026–27	Premier League	9	1	0	0	1	1	—		—		10	2
Tottenham Hotspur	Total		25	2	0	0	1	1	2	0	0	0	28	3
Career total			257	31	19	2	11	1	25	2	10	0	322	36

=== International ===
As of match played 10 June 2025

Appearances and goals by national team and year
National team	Year	Apps	Goals
England	2021	1	0
England	2022	3	0
England	2023	7	0
England	2024	10	1
England	2025	1	0
Total		22	1

As of match played 17 November 2024
England score listed first, score column indicates score after each Gallagher goal

List of international goals scored by Conor Gallagher
No.	Date	Venue	Cap	Opponent	Score	Result	Competition	Ref.
1	17 November 2024	Wembley Stadium, London, England	21	Republic of Ireland	3–0	5–0	2024–25 UEFA Nations League B	

== Honours ==
Chelsea

- UEFA Europa League: 2018–19
- EFL Cup runner-up: 2023–24

England U17

- FIFA U-17 World Cup: 2017

England

- UEFA European Championship runner-up: 2024

Individual

- Chelsea Academy Player of the Year: 2018–19
- EFL Young Player of the Month: August 2019
- Crystal Palace Player of the Year: 2021–22
- Chelsea Goal of the Season: 2022–23
