= Kyle Edwards (footballer, born 1998) =

English footballer (born 1998)

Personal information
- Full name: Kyle Hakeem Edwards
- Date of birth: 17 February 1998 (age 28)
- Place of birth: Dudley, England
- Height: 1.72 m (5 ft 8 in)
- Positions: Attacking midfielder; left winger

Team information
- Current team: Shifnal Town
- Number: 22

Youth career
- 2004–2015: West Bromwich Albion

Senior career*
Years	Team	Apps	(Gls)
2015–2021	West Bromwich Albion	37	(3)
2017–2018	→ Exeter City (loan)	23	(0)
2021–2024	Ipswich Town	50	(3)
2023–2024	→ Oxford United (loan)	5	(1)
2024–2025	Oxford United	7	(0)
2025	Stevenage	8	(0)
2025–2026	Northampton Town	13	(0)
2026-	Shifnal Town	1	(0)

International career
2013	England U16	1	(0)
2014	England U17	3	(0)
2018–2019	England U20	6	(0)
- * Club domestic league appearances and goals as of 29 April 2026 (UTC)

Kyle Hakeem Edwards (born 17 February 1998) is an English professional footballer who plays as an attacking midfielder or left winger for Shifnal Town.

Edwards began his career with West Bromwich Albion, joining the club's academy at the age of six. He made his senior professional debut in September 2017 while on loan at EFL League Two side Exeter City. He made his senior debut for West Brom in August of the following season. During the 2019–20 season, Edwards helped West Brom win promotion from the EFL Championship following a second-placed league finish. He made his Premier League debut in September 2020. He left West Brom in July 2021 following the expiry of his contract, and joined Ipswich Town on a free transfer the following month. Following his contract termination at Ipswich, Edwards signed for Oxford United on 16 January 2024 till the end of the season and, following a period of injury, his contract was further renewed to January 2025.

He has represented England at U16, U17 and U20 levels.

== Club career ==
=== West Bromwich Albion ===
Edwards graduated from the youth academy of West Bromwich Albion, after having joined the setup at the age of six. In September 2015, he was an unused substitute in a Football League Cup match against Norwich City. In September 2017, he was nominated for the Premier League 2 Player of the Month Award for the month of August.

==== Exeter City (loan) ====
On 31 August 2017, Edwards joined EFL League Two club Exeter City on loan until January 2018. He joined Kane Wilson, another loanee from West Brom. The club's assistant manager Matt Oakley commented that he would "add a real strength in depth to our squad". He made his senior debut in a 0–3 defeat against Notts County on 26 September. On 4 October 2017, he scored his first senior goal in a Football League Trophy match against Plymouth Argyle, a match which ended 2–2. In January, Edwards' loan spell was extended until the end of the 2017–18 season. He helped Exeter reach the 2018 EFL League Two play-off final against Coventry City following a 4th-placed league finish. During the play-off final, Edwards came off the bench to score a consolation goal as Exeter lost 1–3 to Coventry at Wembley Stadium. Edwards made 28 appearances for Exeter during his loan spell, scoring twice.

==== Return to West Brom ====
On 26 January 2018, Edwards extended his contract at West Bromwich Albion until 2020. He made his Albion debut as a half-time substitute in the club's 1–0 win against Luton Town in the EFL Cup on 14 August 2018. He scored his first goal for West Brom in his following appearance, netting the winning goal in a 1–0 EFL Cup win against Mansfield Town on 28 August. On 16 March 2019, Edwards scored the winning goal in a 1–0 away win against Brentford. He scored twice in 11 appearances during his first full season in the West Brom first team, helping the club reach the EFL Championship play-offs.

Edwards scored his first goal of the 2019–20 season in the opening match against Nottingham Forest, the match finishing in a 2–1 win for West Brom. He managed to feature more regularly during the 2019–20 season, scoring his second goal of the campaign in a 5–1 win against Swansea City on 8 December. Edwards made 30 appearances during the season, 26 of which came in the EFL Championship, helping West Brom win promotion to the Premier League following a second-placed league finish. In May 2020, West Brom took up the option to extend Edwards' contract by an additional year, keeping him at the club until the summer of 2021.

He made his Premier League debut in a 0–3 defeat against Leicester City on 13 September 2020. He featured infrequently in the West Brom first team under manager Slaven Bilić during the first half of the 2020–21 season, and found game time very limited during the second half of the season following the arrival of Sam Allardyce, his only appearance coming in an FA Cup third-round tie against Blackpool on 9 January. He made 8 appearances in all competitions during the season, as West Brom suffered relegation from the Premier League after finishing 19th.

On 27 May 2021 it was announced that he would leave West Bromwich Albion following the conclusion of his contract, ending a 17-year spell at the club.

=== Ipswich Town ===
Edwards joined Ipswich Town on a free transfer on 9 August 2021, signing a 3-year deal. He made his debut as a second-half substitute in a 1–2 away loss against Burton Albion on 14 August.

On 11 January 2024, it was announced that Edwards had left Ipswich Town following the mutual termination of his contract.

=== Oxford United ===
On 1 September 2023, Edwards joined Oxford United on a season-long loan. He made his first appearance as a 71st-minute substitute in a home League defeat to Port Vale the following day, and scored his first goal in an EFL Trophy win over Northampton Town three days after that. His first league start, and first league goal (described as a "beauty" and a "thunderbolt") for Oxford came in a 3–0 away victory over Fleetwood Town on 16 September.

A recurring hamstring injury meant that in late November 2023 Edwards was ruled out until April, at which point his loan deal at Oxford United was terminated – though in January it was announced he would stay at the club to recover from his injury, with Ipswich Town terminating his contract several days later. On 16 January 2024, he joined Oxford on a permanent basis, signing a short-term deal until the end of the season. In September 2024, the club announced that he had signed a further deal until January 2025.

=== Northampton Town ===
On 1 September 2025, Edwards joined EFL League One club Northampton Town on a contract that would see him at the club until January 2026. On 3 January 2026, he extended his deal until the end of the season.

== International career ==
Edwards has represented England at multiple youth team levels. He won 1 cap for the England U16 team in 2013. He won 3 caps for the England U17 team in 2014. Edwards made his debut for the England U20 team in 2018, going onto win 5 caps between 2018 and 2019. He was a member of the 2019 Toulon Tournament squad.

== Style of play ==
In 2017, Darren Moore (then Professional Development Coach of West Bromwich Albion) described Edwards as an exciting talent with real potential. Moore also said that Edwards was "quick and very direct and has tight ball control. He has the ability to go past people and create things."

== Personal life ==
Edwards grew up in Dudley in the West Midlands and attended Bishop Milner Catholic College.

Following West Brom's promotion to the Premier League in 2020, Edwards released the rap track "Promotion Ting" via Link Up TV, the video amassing over 100,000 views on YouTube.

== Career statistics ==
As of match played 14 January 2026

Appearances and goals by club, season and competition
Club	Season	League			FA Cup		League Cup		Other		Total	
Club	Season	Division	Apps	Goals	Apps	Goals	Apps	Goals	Apps	Goals	Apps	Goals
West Bromwich Albion	2018–19	Championship	6	1	2	0	3	1	0	0	11	2
West Bromwich Albion	2019–20	Championship	26	2	3	0	1	0	–		30	2
West Bromwich Albion	2020–21	Premier League	5	0	1	0	2	0	–		8	0
West Bromwich Albion	Total		37	3	6	0	6	1	0	0	49	4
Exeter City (loan)	2017–18	League Two	23	0	2	0	0	0	3 (Note: Two appearances and one goal in EFL Trophy, one appearance and one goal in EFL League Two play-offs)	2	28	2
Ipswich Town	2021–22	League One	18	0	2	0	0	0	2 (Note: Appearances in EFL Trophy)	0	22	0
Ipswich Town	2022–23	League One	32	3	5	0	1	0	3	0	41	3
Ipswich Town	2023–24	Championship	0	0	0	0	0	0	–		0	0
Ipswich Town	Total		50	3	7	0	1	0	5	0	63	3
Oxford United (loan)	2023–24	League One	5	1	0	0	0	0	1 (Note: One appearance and one goal in EFL Trophy)	1	6	2
Oxford United	2024–25	Championship	7	0	0	0	0	0	0	0	7	0
Stevenage	2024–25	League One	8	0	0	0	0	0	0	0	8	0
Northampton Town	2025–26	League One	9	0	1	0	0	0	3	1	13	1
Career total			139	7	16	0	7	1	12	4	174	12

== Honours ==
West Bromwich Albion

- EFL Championship second-place promotion: 2019–20

Ipswich Town

- EFL League One second-place promotion: 2022–23
