= Nathan Ferguson (footballer, born 2000) =

English footballer

Personal information
- Full name: Nathan Kirk-Patrick Ferguson
- Date of birth: 6 October 2000 (age 26)
- Place of birth: Birmingham, England
- Height: 5 ft 10 in (1.78 m)
- Positions: Centre-back; left-back

Youth career
- 2009–2019: West Bromwich Albion

Senior career*
Years	Team	Apps	(Gls)
2019–2020	West Bromwich Albion	21	(1)
2020–2024	Crystal Palace	1	(0)

International career
2018	England U18	1	(0)
2018	England U19	3	(0)
2019–2022	England U20	4	(0)
- * Club domestic league appearances and goals as of 21:07, 26 December 2021 (UTC)

Nathan Kirk-Patrick Ferguson (born 6 October 2000) is an English professional footballer who plays as a centre-back or left-back.

== Club career ==
=== West Bromwich Albion ===
Ferguson joined West Bromwich Albion at the age of 8. On 21 December 2017, he signed his first professional contract with the club, a deal which saw him remain with the club until the summer of 2020.

Ferguson made his professional debut for the Baggies on 3 August 2019 as a starter in Albion's opening day 2–1 victory against Nottingham Forest in the EFL Championship. After rejecting a new contract with Albion, he left the club on 30 June 2020 after his contract expired.

=== Crystal Palace ===
Ferguson joined fellow Premier League side Crystal Palace on 21 July 2020 on a three-year deal. Shortly after joining the club, he suffered a serious knee injury which required him to have an MRI scan. This was followed by a minor thigh injury in December of that year.

After a lengthy delay due to injury, Ferguson returned to football and made his debut for Crystal Palace on 26 December 2021 in a 3–0 defeat to Tottenham Hotspur, coming on as an 82nd-minute substitute for Tyrick Mitchell. He also made the bench for the games against Norwich City on 28 December and Brighton & Hove Albion on 14 January 2022. Due to more injuries he wouldn't play for the first team in a competitive game after the match against Tottenham, making it his only ever league appearance for Crystal Palace.

On 16 June 2023, Ferguson signed a new one-year contract with Crystal Palace until the summer of 2024, despite being out due to injury.

In June 2024, Crystal Palace announced that Ferguson would leave the club at the expiration of his contract in the summer, having appeared sparingly for the first team due to numerous injuries.

=== Portsmouth trial ===
In August 2025, Ferguson was on trial at Portsmouth and had featured in pre-season friendlies against Woking FC, Farnborough FC, Reading FC and Havant & Waterlooville but did not earn a contract and eventually left the club.

== International career ==
Born in England, Ferguson is of Jamaican descent, making him eligible to represent the Jamaica national team. In May 2018, he was called up to the England U18 squad to compete in the Panda Cup. In July 2018, he represented England U19 at the UEFA U19 Euro 2018.

Ferguson made his England U20 debut on 9 September 2019 during a 1–0 victory against Switzerland.

== Career statistics ==
As of match played 26 December 2021

Appearances and goals by club, season and competition
Club	Season	League			FA Cup		League Cup		Other		Total	
Club	Season	Division	Apps	Goals	Apps	Goals	Apps	Goals	Apps	Goals	Apps	Goals
West Bromwich Albion	2019–20	Championship	21	1	0	0	0	0	0	0	21	1
Crystal Palace	2020–21	Premier League	0	0	0	0	0	0	—		0	0
Crystal Palace	2021–22	Premier League	1	0	0	0	0	0	—		1	0
Crystal Palace	2022–23	Premier League	0	0	0	0	0	0	—		0	0
Crystal Palace	2023–24	Premier League	0	0	0	0	0	0	—		0	0
Total			1	0	0	0	0	0	0	0	1	0
Career total			22	1	0	0	0	0	0	0	22	1
