= 2021–22 Premier League Cup =

Tournament details
- Country: England; Wales
- Teams: 36

Final positions
- Champions: West Bromwich Albion (1st Title)
- Runners-up: Wolverhampton Wanderers (1st Runner Up Finish)

Tournament statistics
- Matches played: 115
- Goals scored: 419 (3.64 per match)
- Top goal scorer: (England) Douglas James-Taylor Stoke City (7 Goals)

The 2021–22 Premier League Cup was the eighth edition of the competition. The defending champions, Everton, who won the 2018–19 competition, were eliminated in the group stage. The previous two editions of the competition were cancelled, or not completed due to the COVID-19 pandemic in the United Kingdom.

== Participants ==
36 teams participated in the competition this year, 4 fewer than in 2019–2020. Cambridge United, Crystal Palace, Fleetwood Town, Scunthorpe United, Shrewsbury Town, and Yeovil Town did not after participating in last year's competition after one season, meanwhile Aston Villa, Bristol Rovers, Liverpool, Newport County, and Portsmouth did not return after 3, 3, 5, 2, and 4 straight seasons in the competition respectively. Finally, Hull City did not return after 7 straight seasons in the competition.

5 teams returned to the competition this season. Arsenal returned for the first time since the inaugural competition in 2013–2014, Queens Park Rangers returned for the first time since 2015–2016, West Ham United for the first time since 2016–2017, and Norwich City and Peterborough United returned after missing 2019–2020's competition. 3 teams, Mansfield Town, Salford City, and Stevenage participated for the very first time in the competition this season.

=== Category 1 ===
- Arsenal
- Blackburn Rovers
- Birmingham City
- Burnley
- Derby County
- Everton
- Fulham
- Leeds United
- Middlesbrough
- Newcastle United
- Norwich City
- Nottingham Forest
- Reading
- Southampton
- Stoke City
- Sunderland
- West Bromwich Albion
- West Ham United
- Wolverhampton Wanderers

=== Category 2 ===
- Charlton Athletic
- Colchester United
- Peterborough United
- Queens Park Rangers
- Sheffield United
- Swansea City
- Watford
- Wigan Athletic

=== Category 3 ===
- AFC Bournemouth
- Exeter City
- Mansfield Town
- Oxford United
- Plymouth Argyle
- Southend United
- Stevenage

=== Category 4 ===
- Huddersfield Town
- Salford City

== Qualifying round ==
A qualifying round was required to finalise the 32 teams that would enter the Group Stage.

11 August 2021	Stevenage	1–1 (4–5 p)	Southend United	Finchley
19:00	Johnson 82'	Report	Rush 89'	Stadium: The Maurice Rebak Stadium
	Penalties
	Smith (penalty scored); Williams (penalty scored); Tinubu (penalty missed); Arai (penalty scored); Johnson (penalty scored); Marshall (penalty missed)		(penalty scored) Brown; (penalty scored) Benton; (penalty scored) Rush; (penalty scored) Sayers; (penalty missed) Davis; (penalty scored) Egbri

11 August 2021	Salford City	2–3	Mansfield Town	Salford
19:00	Sargent 17'; Finley 90+3'	Report	Clarke 25'; Knowles 67'; Sinclair 90+6' (pen.)	Stadium: Moor Lane

18 August 2021	Oxford United	3–4	Huddersfield Town	Thame
19:00	Cooper 18', 73'; Johnson 82'	Report	Jackson 7', 48'; Sinani 12'; Harratt 33'	Stadium: Meadow View Park

3 September 2021	Plymouth Argyle	1–2	Exeter City	Plymouth
19:00	Law 69'	Report	Seymour 3', 65'	Stadium: Home Park; Attendance: 345; Referee: Rowan Clarke

== Group stage ==
The draw for the group stage took place on 25 August 2021. Teams play each other twice, with the group winners and runners–up advance to the round of 16.

=== Group A ===
Team	Pld	W	D	L	GF	GA	GD	Pts
West Bromwich Albion	6	4	1	1	18	8	+10	13
Arsenal	6	2	2	2	11	12	−1	8
AFC Bournemouth	6	2	2	2	8	9	−1	8
Southampton	6	0	3	3	7	15	−8	3

Updated to match(es) played on 14 February 2022. Source:

2 September 2021	Arsenal	1–1	Southampton	Borehamwood
19:00	Bierith 45'		Watts 16'	Stadium: Meadow Park

7 September 2021	West Bromwich Albion	2–0	AFC Bournemouth	Wellington
19:00	Windsor 45+2'; Richards 75'			Stadium: New Bucks Head

23 September 2021	Southampton	0–6	West Bromwich Albion	Totton
19:00			Richards 2'; De Castro 45+3'; Andrews 48' (pen.); Faal 72', 85'; Windsor 84'	Stadium: The Snows Stadium

6 October 2021	AFC Bournemouth	1–1	Arsenal	Boscombe
19:00	Saydee 90+4'	Report	Swanson 34'	Stadium: Dean Court; Attendance: 2,226

11 November 2021	Arsenal	1–4	West Bromwich Albion	Borehamwood
19:00	Edwards 90'		Fellows 6'; Cleary 11', 54'; Tulloch 20'	Stadium: Meadow Park

12 December 2021	Southampton	2–3	Arsenal	Marchwood
14:00	Watts 4'; Olaigbe 45' (pen.)		Ideho 21'; Balogun 76'; Biereth 80'	Stadium: Staplewood Campus

16 December 2021	AFC Bournemouth	4–0	West Bromwich Albion	Boscombe
19:00	Ibsen Rossi 29'; Saydee 41'; Pollock 55', 71'			Stadium: Dean Court

13 January 2022	West Bromwich Albion	2–2	Southampton	Wellington
19:00	Andrews 68' (pen.); Cleary 90'		Mitchell 45'; Olaigbe 74'	Stadium: New Bucks Head

18 January 2022	Arsenal	4–0	AFC Bournemouth	Borehamwood
19:00	Flores 2', 81'; Henry-Francis 32'; Cozier-Duberry 71'			Stadium: Meadow Park

27 January 2022	Southampton	0–1	AFC Bournemouth	Totton
12:00			Pollock 10'	Stadium: The Snows Stadium; Attendance: 290
Note: Match abandoned when first played 23 November after 60 minutes due to heavy fog. Match was rearranged for 22 December – which was again postponed due to a rise in COVID-19 cases in the area.

11 February 2022	AFC Bournemouth	2–2	Southampton	Boscombe
19:00	Scrimshaw 81', 84' (pen.)		Olaigbe 36'; Small 55'	Stadium: Dean Court

14 February 2022	West Bromwich Albion	4–1	Arsenal	Wellington
19:00	Richards 5'; Cleary 50'; Andrews 89' (pen.); Faal 90+4'		Giraud-Hutchinson 67'	Stadium: New Bucks Head

=== Group B ===
Team	Pld	W	D	L	GF	GA	GD	Pts
Middlesbrough	6	3	0	3	13	10	+3	9
Queens Park Rangers	6	3	0	3	15	14	+1	9
Blackburn Rovers	6	3	0	3	16	16	0	9
Nottingham Forest	6	3	0	3	13	17	−4	9

Updated to match(es) played on 14 February 2022. Source:

6 September 2021	Middlesbrough	1–0	Queens Park Rangers	Bishop Auckland
11:00	Olusanya 90+1'			Stadium: Heritage Park

6 September 2021	Nottingham Forest	4–1	Blackburn Rovers	Nottingham
19:00	Lolley 4', 36'; Konaté 46'; Swan 67'		Burns 13'	Stadium: Meadow Lane

8 October 2021	Blackburn Rovers	3–2	Middlesbrough	Leyland
19:00	Burns 4'; Harlock 41'; Leonard 73'		Gibson 1'; Fletcher 85'	Stadium: County Ground

12 October 2021	Queens Park Rangers	6–2	Nottingham Forest	Ruislip
19:00	Odysseus 5', 46'; Duke-McKenna 9', 15' (pen.); Drewe 12'; Adarkwa 64'		Konaté 45+1'; Salmon 55'	Stadium: Grosvenor Vale

12 November 2021	Middlesbrough	2–1	Nottingham Forest	Bishop Auckland
19:00	Lindo 12'; Finch 88'		Fewster 21'	Stadium: Heritage Park

16 November 2021	Queens Park Rangers	1–0	Blackburn Rovers	Ruislip
13:00	Kelman 72'			Stadium: Grosvenor Vale

13 December 2021	Blackburn Rovers	5–1	Nottingham Forest	Leyland
19:00	Leonard 7', 41'; Burns 45+2', 88'; Harlock 58'		Hammond 21'	Stadium: County Ground

2 January 2022	Middlesbrough	2–4	Blackburn Rovers	Bishop Auckland
13:00	Malley 53'; Green 85'		Baker 13'; Brennan 17' (pen.), 40', 62'	Stadium: Heritage Park

5 January 2022	Queens Park Rangers	0–5	Middlesbrough	London
13:00			Fletcher 1', 15', 23'; Willis 40'; Kavanagh 45+2'	Stadium: Imperial College Sports Ground

19 January 2022	Nottingham Forest	3–2	Queens Park Rangers	Alfreton
19:00	Donnelly 16'; Back 63'; Larsson 89'		Kargbo 26'; de Wijs 45'	Stadium: North Street; Attendance: 126

11 February 2022	Nottingham Forest	2–1	Middlesbrough	Alfreton
18:00	Swan 21', 89'		Trialist 2' (o.g.)	Stadium: North Street

14 February 2022	Blackburn Rovers	3–6	Queens Park Rangers	Leyland
13:00	Dack 19'; Durrant 72'; Harlock 90+4'		Ajose 16'; Dozzell 54'; Kargbo 70', 90+5'; Mema 81', 89'	Stadium: County Ground

=== Group C ===
Team	Pld	W	D	L	GF	GA	GD	Pts
Derby County	6	5	1	0	17	9	+8	16
Charlton Athletic	6	3	1	2	14	6	+8	10
Norwich City	6	1	2	3	12	16	−4	5
Reading	6	1	0	5	6	18	−12	3

Updated to match(es) played on 14 February 2022. Source:

8 September 2021	Charlton Athletic	3–0	Reading	Dartford
14:00	Vennings 33'; Burstow 53'; Powell 62'			Stadium: Princes Park

13 September 2021	Norwich City	3–3	Derby County	Norwich
12:30	Dickson-Peters 42', 83', 90+2'		Aghatsie 15'; Cybulski 45'; Al-Hamadi 70' (pen.)	Stadium: Lotus Training Centre

11 October 2021	Reading	3–2	Norwich City	Reading
13:00	Clarke 9', 59', 85'		Dickson-Peters 43'; Kamara 90+1'	Stadium: Madejski Stadium

11 October 2021	Derby County	2–1	Charlton Athletic	Loughborough
19:00	Plange 45'; Watson 68'		Dempsey 75'	Stadium: Loughborough University Stadium; Attendance: 116

15 November 2021	Derby County	2–1	Reading	Loughborough
19:00	Hutchinson 1'; Plange 43'		Senga-Ngoyi 84'	Stadium: Loughborough University Stadium

19 November 2021	Norwich City	1–1	Charlton Athletic	Norwich
19:00	Rowe 24'		Aouachria 48'	Stadium: Lotus Training Centre

13 December 2021	Reading	0–5	Charlton Athletic	Reading
13:00			Gavin 53', 76'; Chin 64'; Viggars 82'; Williams 85'	Stadium: Madejski Stadium

13 December 2021	Derby County	5–2	Norwich City	Loughborough
19:00	Cashin 25'; Sibley 36', 49', 87'; Dixon 40'		Rowe 70', 75'	Stadium: Loughborough University Stadium; Attendance: 162

14 January 2022	Charlton Athletic	1–2	Derby County	East Dulwich
19:00	Gavin 31'		Watson 8' (pen.); Aghatise 67'	Stadium: Champion Hill

17 January 2022	Norwich City	3–1	Reading	Norwich
15:00	Rowe 24'; Clarke 69', 88'		Okine-Peters 30'	Stadium: Lotus Training Centre

14 February 2022	Reading	1–3	Derby County	Reading
13:00	Clarke 14' (pen.)		Cashin 21'; Wilson 57'; Grewell-Pollard 75'	Stadium: Madejski Stadium

14 February 2022	Charlton Athletic	3–1	Norwich City	Dartford
19:00	Ghandour 37'; Powell 45+4', 55'		Kamara 26'	Stadium: Princes Park

=== Group D ===
Team	Pld	W	D	L	GF	GA	GD	Pts
Peterborough United	6	3	1	2	13	8	+5	10
Sheffield United	6	3	1	2	9	10	−1	10
Everton	6	3	0	3	8	9	−1	9
Burnley	6	2	0	4	8	11	−3	6

Updated to match(es) played on 24 February 2022. Source:

17 September 2021	Everton	1–3	Sheffield United	Southport
19:00	Dobbin 9'		Marsh 14'; Lankshear 25', 46'	Stadium: Haig Avenue

11 October 2021	Sheffield United	0–3	Burnley	Chesterfield
19:00			Mellon 31'; Tucker 43'; Thompson 82'	Stadium: Technique Stadium

19 October 2021	Burnley	1–2	Peterborough United	Leyland
19:00	Lakin 30'		O'Connell 18' (pen.); Ishola 43'	Stadium: County Ground

25 October 2021	Everton	2–0	Burnley	Southport
19:00	Hughes 75'; Cannon 84'			Stadium: Haig Avenue

23 November 2021	Peterborough United	3–3	Sheffield United	Stamford
19:00	Fernandez 51'; Tomlinson 67', 82'		Gordon 16', 90+4'; Ndiaye 41'	Stadium: Borderville Stadium

1 December 2021	Everton	0–3	Peterborough United	Southport
19:00			Taylor 14'; Poku 28', 85'	Stadium: Haig Avenue

17 December 2021	Peterborough United	0–1	Everton	Peterborough
13:00			Mills 78'	Stadium: London Road Stadium

6 January 2022	Sheffield United	1–3	Everton	Chesterfield
19:00	Osula 3'		Kouyate 26'; Mills 45', 49'	Stadium: Technique Stadium

28 January 2022	Burnley	0–1	Sheffield United	Leyland
19:00			Ayari 6' (pen.)	Stadium: County Ground

11 February 2022	Burnley	2–1	Everton	Leyland
13:00	Thomas 44'; McGlynn 89'		Dobbin 30'	Stadium: County Ground

13 February 2022	Sheffield United	1–0	Peterborough United	Chesterfield
19:00	Cappello 30'			Stadium: Technique Stadium

24 February 2022	Peterborough United	5–2	Burnley	Peterborough
13:00	Oluwabori 21'; Taylor 40', 48'; O'Connell 64', 79' (pen.)		Costelloe 32'; McGlynn 38'	Stadium: London Road Stadium
Note: Match was originally scheduled for 4 January 2022, but was postponed due to injuries and COVID-19 cases in both teams. The rearranged fixture on 18 February 2022 was again postponed, due to the effects of Storm Eunice

=== Group E ===
Team	Pld	W	D	L	GF	GA	GD	Pts
Wigan Athletic	6	4	1	1	13	7	+6	13
Leeds United	6	2	2	2	10	10	0	8
Sunderland	6	1	3	2	9	13	−4	6
Mansfield Town	6	1	2	3	7	9	−2	5

Updated to match(es) played on 7 March 2022. Source:

6 September 2021	Mansfield Town	3–0	Sunderland	Mansfield
19:00	Caine 18'; Law 25'; Sinclair 35'			Stadium: Field Mill; Attendance: 345; Referee: Garreth Rhodes

8 September 2021	Leeds United	1–2	Wigan Athletic	York
19:00	Moore 8'		Baningime 10'; McHugh 19'	Stadium: York Community Stadium

10 October 2021	Sunderland	2–1	Leeds United	Sunderland
13:00	Jessup 23'; Kachosa 55'		Summerville 41'	Stadium: Stadium of Light

28 October 2021	Wigan Athletic	3–0	Mansfield Town	Leyland
19:00	Carragher 3'; McGee 34'; Costello 81'			Stadium: County Ground

15 November 2021	Leeds United	2–1	Mansfield Town	York
19:00	McGurk 52'; Dean 71'		Gale 85'	Stadium: York Community Stadium

17 November 2021	Wigan Athletic	3–1	Sunderland	Leyland
13:00	Sze 47', 68', 84'		Harris 10'	Stadium: County Ground

13 December 2021	Sunderland	1–1	Mansfield Town	Hetton-le-Hole
19:00	Dyce 66'	Report	Scott 57'	Stadium: Eppleton Colliery Welfare Ground; Attendance: 145

5 January 2022	Leeds United	3–3	Sunderland	York
19:00	Summerville 8', 21', 35'		Dunne 57'; Kelly 81'; Kachosa 90'	Stadium: York Community Stadium; Attendance: 350

14 January 2022	Wigan Athletic	1–2	Leeds United	Leyland
19:00	Costello 27'		Kenneh 11'; Dean 66'	Stadium: County Ground
Note: Match originally scheduled for 16 December 2021, but was postponed due to concerns about the condition of the pitch at the County Ground.

14 February 2022	Sunderland	2–2	Wigan Athletic	Hetton-le-Hole
19:00	Johnson 43'; McGee 50' (o.g.)		McHugh 90'; Costello 90+5'	Stadium: Eppleton Colliery Welfare Ground; Attendance: 194

23 February 2022	Mansfield Town	1–2	Wigan Athletic	Mansfield
19:00	Law 90+3'		Pinnington 24'; Baningime 75'	Stadium: Moor Farm Training Centre; Attendance: Behind Closed Doors
Note: Originally scheduled for 18 February 2022, but was postponed due to the effects of Storm Eunice.

7 March 2022	Mansfield Town	1–1	Leeds United	Mansfield
13:00	Johnson 30'	Report	Littlewood 70'	Stadium: RH Academy; Attendance: BCD
Note: Originally scheduled for 14 February 2022, but was postponed due to a waterlogged pitch. The rearranged fixture on 21 February was moved to Mansfield's training ground, but was once again postponed due to the effects of Storm Franklin.

=== Group F ===
Team	Pld	W	D	L	GF	GA	GD	Pts
West Ham United	6	4	1	1	11	5	+6	13
Wolverhampton Wanderers	6	3	2	1	8	6	+2	11
Exeter City	6	1	2	3	9	12	−3	5
Swansea City	6	0	3	3	7	12	−5	3

Updated to match(es) played on 22 February 2022. Source:

3 September 2021	Wolverhampton Wanderers	1–0	West Ham United	Kidderminster
14:00	Birtwistle 12'			Stadium: Aggborough Stadium

7 September 2021	Exeter City	1–1	Swansea City	Exeter
19:00	Rowe 42'		Morgan 35'	Stadium: St James Park; Attendance: 413

15 September 2021	Exeter City	2–3	Wolverhampton Wanderers	Exeter
19:00	Cox 8'; Pond 61'	Report	Campbell 27'; Carty 50'; Corbett 57'	Stadium: St James Park; Attendance: 571

13 October 2021	West Ham United	3–2	Exeter City	Romford
14:00	Ashby 33' (pen.); Rosa 86'; Simon-Swyer 90'		Iseguan 14'; Coley 68'	Stadium: Rush Green Training Ground

25 November 2021	Swansea City	0–2	Wolverhampton Wanderers	Landore
14:00			Hesketh 40'; Cundle 60' (pen.)	Stadium: Landore Training Centre

3 December 2021	Swansea City	2–4	West Ham United	Landore
12:00	Abdulai 59'; Whittaker 80' (pen.)		Alese 21'; Fevrier 32'; Oko-Flex 49'; Djú 78'	Stadium: Landore Training Centre

13 December 2021	West Ham United	0–0	Wolverhampton Wanderers	Romford
14:00				Stadium: Rush Green Training Ground

14 January 2022	Swansea City	2–2	Exeter City	Landore
14:00	Forrester 34', 75'		Rowe 39'; Daniel 63'	Stadium: Landore Training Centre

18 January 2022	Exeter City	0–3	West Ham United	Exeter
19:00		Report	Ashby 60'; Oko-Flex 77'; Nevers 85'	Stadium: St James Park; Attendance: 509

4 February 2022	Wolverhampton Wanderers	2–2	Swansea City	Kidderminster
14:00	Rushesha 44' (o.g.); Frazer 51'		Cotterill 12'; Campbell 15'	Stadium: Aggborough Stadium

11 February 2022	West Ham United	1–0	Swansea City	Romford
14:00	Yarmolenko 45+2'			Stadium: Rush Green Training Ground

22 February 2022	Wolverhampton Wanderers	0–2	Exeter City	Kidderminster
14:00			Hanson 7'; Johnson 25'	Stadium: Aggborough Stadium; Attendance: 250

=== Group G ===
Team	Pld	W	D	L	GF	GA	GD	Pts
Huddersfield Town	6	5	1	0	17	3	+14	16
Newcastle United	6	3	1	2	9	6	+3	10
Watford	6	2	0	4	7	15	−8	6
Birmingham City	6	1	0	5	6	15	−9	3

Updated to match(es) played on 17 February 2022. Source:

6 September 2021	Watford	2–0	Newcastle United	St Albans
18:00	Pochettino 33'; Forde 36'			Stadium: Clarence Park; Attendance: 245

15 September 2021	Birmingham City	1–2	Huddersfield Town	Nuneaton
20:00	Dos Reis 50'		Harratt 76'; Shanks 90+1'	Stadium: Liberty Way

8 October 2021	Huddersfield Town	6–0	Watford	Huddersfield
19:00	Harratt 12'; Russell 15', 18'; Obiero 24', 45+4'; Headley 30'			Stadium: John Smith's Stadium

11 October 2021	Newcastle United	4–0	Birmingham City	Newcastle-upon-Tyne
19:00	Westendorf 8'; Anderson 52', 90+2' (pen.); Stephenson 78'			Stadium: Northumberland FA; Attendance: 304

17 November 2021	Newcastle United	1–1	Huddersfield Town	Newcastle-upon-Tyne
19:00	Turner-Cooke 50'	Report	Harratt 29' (pen.)	Stadium: Northumberland FA; Attendance: 316

23 November 2021	Watford	4–1	Birmingham City	St Albans
19:00	McKiernan 12'; Pochettino 21', 73'; Chikukwa 23'		Hurst 5' (pen.)	Stadium: Clarence Park

10 December 2021	Newcastle United	2–1	Watford	Newcastle-upon-Tyne
19:00	Stephenson 4'; De Bolle 82'	Report	McKiernan 90+2'	Stadium: Northumberland FA; Attendance: 138

13 December 2021	Huddersfield Town	3–1	Birmingham City	Huddersfield
19:00	Diarra 41'; Russell 62'; Grant 63'		Hurst 67'	Stadium: John Smith's Stadium

21 January 2022	Birmingham City	0–2	Newcastle United	Nuneaton
19:00			Bondswell 76'; Brookwell 81' (pen.)	Stadium: Liberty Way

2 February 2022	Watford	0–3	Huddersfield Town	St Albans
19:00			Jones 45+2'; Shanks 48', 75'	Stadium: Clarence Park

14 February 2022	Huddersfield Town	2–0	Newcastle United	Huddersfield
19:00	Headley 26'; Grant 39'			Stadium: John Smith's Stadium

17 February 2022	Birmingham City	3–0	Watford	Nuneaton
13:30	Wakefield 6', 22'; Soldevila 17'			Stadium: Liberty Way

=== Group H ===
Team	Pld	W	D	L	GF	GA	GD	Pts
Fulham	6	5	1	0	14	4	+10	16
Stoke City	6	3	0	3	15	11	+4	9
Colchester United	6	1	2	3	8	10	−2	5
Southend United	6	1	1	4	4	16	−12	4

Updated to match(es) played on 14 February 2022. Source:

6 September 2021	Southend United	1–3	Fulham	Southend-on-Sea
19:00	Stewart 23'		Hilton 50'; O'Neill 73'; Robinson 85'	Stadium: Roots Hall; Attendance: 224

10 September 2021	Stoke City	2–4	Colchester United	Newcastle-under-Lyme
19:00	Jarrett 24'; Porter 34'		Hasanally 23'; Cooper 56'; Tovide 72'; Thomas 84'	Stadium: Lyme Valley Stadium

8 October 2021	Colchester United	1–1	Southend United	Colchester
19:00	Terry 68'		Unwin 16'	Stadium: Colchester Community Stadium; Attendance: 127

8 October 2021	Fulham	2–1	Stoke City	New Malden
19:00	Tiéhi 48'; Sanderson 82'		Porter 57'	Stadium: Motspur Park; Attendance: 110

16 November 2021	Colchester United	0–0	Fulham	Colchester
19:00				Stadium: Colchester Community Stadium

22 November 2021	Stoke City	3–0	Southend United	Newcastle-under-Lyme
19:00	Taylor 62', 65', 69'			Stadium: Lyme Valley Stadium; Attendance: 106

8 December 2021	Fulham	4–0	Southend United	New Malden
19:00	Bowie 11'; O'Neill 85'; Sessegnon 86'; Tiéhi 89'			Stadium: Motspur Park; Attendance: 42

21 January 2022	Colchester United	2–3	Stoke City	Colchester
19:00	Thomas 30'; Cooper 90' (pen.)		Norton 33'; Goodwin 59'; Jarrett 75'	Stadium: Colchester Community Stadium

25 January 2022	Southend United	1–0	Colchester United	Southend-on-Sea
20:00	Walsh 90+4'			Stadium: Roots Hall; Attendance: 97

10 February 2022	Stoke City	1–2	Fulham	Newcastle-under-Lyme
13:00	Will Forrester 58'		Hilton 3'; Trialist 69'	Stadium: Lyme Valley Stadium

14 February 2022	Fulham	3–1	Colchester United	New Malden
19:00	Trialist 10'; Sanderson 65'; Pajaziti 86'		Andrews 50'	Stadium: Motspur Park

14 February 2022	Southend United	1–5	Stoke City	Southend-on-Sea
19:00	Unwin 85'		James-Taylor 8', 14', 71'; Goodwin 30'; Wright-Phillips 90+1'	Stadium: Roots Hall; Attendance: 128

== Knockout stages ==
=== Round of 16 ===
The draw for the round of 16 took place on 1 March 2022.

4 March 2022	Peterborough United	6–2	Charlton Athletic	Peterborough
13:00	Taylor 6', 20', 23', 79'; Clarke-Harris 84'; Hickinson 90+3'		Kanu 5', 74'	Stadium: London Road Stadium

4 March 2022	Fulham	2–0	Newcastle United	New Malden
14:00	Bowie 9'; Stansfield 89'			Stadium: Motspur Park

4 March 2022	Wigan Athletic	0–1	Wolverhampton Wanderers	Stalybridge
19:00			Campbell 70'	Stadium: Bower Fold; Attendance: BCD

7 March 2022	Derby County	4–3 (a.e.t.)	Sheffield United	Loughborough
19:00	Sibley 45+3'; Cybulski 49'; McDonald 110'; Shonibare 117'		Arblaster 40'; Osula 90', 97'	Stadium: Loughborough University Stadium

7 March 2022	West Bromwich Albion	4–2	Queens Park Rangers	Hednesford
19:00	Cleary 3', 41'; Richards 64'; Nguepissi 80'		Armstrong 13', 62'	Stadium: Keys Park

9 March 2022	Middlesbrough	1–1 (a.e.t.) (4–3 p)	Arsenal	Bishop Auckland
18:00	Walker 77'		Giraud-Hutchinson 89' (pen.)	Stadium: Heritage Park
	Penalties
	Gibson (penalty scored); Cornet (penalty scored); Walker (penalty missed); Trialist (penalty scored); Stott (penalty scored)		(penalty missed) Ogungbo; (penalty scored) Swanson; (penalty scored) Azeez; (penalty scored) Flores; (penalty missed) Giraud-Hutchinson

9 March 2022	Huddersfield Town	1–3	Stoke City	Huddersfield
19:00	Obiero 58'		James-Taylor 20'; Oakley-Boothe 23', 39'	Stadium: John Smith's Stadium

11 April 2022	West Ham United	5–1	Leeds United	Romford
16:00	Oko-Flex 21', 61' (pen.); Chesters 37'; Perkins 81' (pen.); Longelo 82'		Joseph 16'	Stadium: Rush Green Training Ground; Attendance: Behind Closed Doors

=== Quarter–final ===
The quarter-final draw was confirmed on 21 March 2022.

8 April 2022	Stoke City	1–2	Middlesbrough	Stoke-on-Trent
19:00	Griffiths 81'		Sykes 53'; Gibson 90+5' (pen.)	Stadium: Bet365 Stadium

10 April 2022	Derby County	3–4	West Bromwich Albion	Derby
14:00	Aghatise 22'; Watson 45+2'; Sibley 79'		Andrews 36'; Malcolm 44'; Ashworth 63', 65'	Stadium: Pride Park Stadium

10 April 2022	Peterborough United	0–1	Wolverhampton Wanderers	Peterborough
14:00			Campbell 54'	Stadium: London Road Stadium

22 April 2022	West Ham United	0–1	Fulham	Romford
19:00			Hilton 53'	Stadium: Rush Green Training Ground

=== Semi–final ===
The semi-final draw was announced on 26 April 2022.

3 May 2022	West Bromwich Albion	2–1	Fulham	West Bromwich
19:00	Taylor 37'; Faal 56'		Ablade 90+4'	Stadium: The Hawthorns

4 May 2022	Wolverhampton Wanderers	3–2	Middlesbrough	Wolverhampton
19:00	Harkin 1'; Cundle 45+2', 70'		Kavanagh 6'; Walker 90'	Stadium: Molineux Stadium

=== Final ===
The final details were announced on 6 May 2022, with West Bromwich Albion being picked as the home team.

13 May 2022
19:10

West Bromwich Albion	2–2 (a.e.t.)	Wolverhampton Wanderers
Castro 10'; Faal 109'	Report	Harkin 30'; Bueno 99'
Penalties
Andrews (penalty scored); Malcolm (penalty missed); R. Richards (penalty missed); Ashworth (penalty scored); Faal (penalty missed); Teixeira (penalty scored); Taylor (penalty scored); Ingram (penalty scored)	5–4	(penalty scored) Campbell; (penalty scored) Hodge; (penalty missed) Perry; (penalty missed) Cundle; (penalty missed) Shabani; (penalty scored) Hubner; (penalty scored) Mosquera; (penalty missed) Marques

The Hawthorns, West Bromwich
Attendance: 7,530

Note: Flags indicate national team as defined under FIFA eligibility rules; some limited exceptions apply. Players may hold more than one non-FIFA nationality.

West Bromwich Albion
No.	Pos.	Nation	Player
1	GK	ENG	Ted Cann
2	DF	ENG	Reece Hall
3	DF	ENG	Caleb Taylor
4	DF	ENG	Cianole Nguepissi
5	DF	ENG	Ethan Ingram
6	MF	POR	Aurio Teixeira
7	MF	ENG	Jamie Andrews
8	DF	WAL	Zac Ashworth
9	MF	ENG	Tom Fellows
10	FW	GAM	Modou Faal
11	FW	POR	Quévin Castro
Substitutes:
12	GK	WAL	Ronnie Hollingshead
13	DF	WAL	Alex Williams
14	MF	ENG	Matthew Richards
15	MF	ENG	Rico Richards
16	FW	ENG	Jovan Malcolm
Coach: (Jamaica) Deon Burton

Wolverhampton Wanderers
No.	Pos.	Nation	Player
1	GK	DEN	Andreas Søndergaard
2	DF	JAM	Dexter Lembikisa
3	DF	ESP	Hugo Bueno
4	DF	COL	Yerson Mosquera
5	DF	POR	Christian Marques
6	DF	IDN	Justin Hubner
7	MF	ENG	Luke Cundle
8	MF	ENG	Harvey Griffiths
9	FW	NIR	Lee Harkin
10	FW	IRL	Joe Hodge
11	FW	WAL	Chem Campbell
Substitutes:
12	DF	ENG	Ollie Tipton
13	DF	SGP	Harry Birtwistle
14	MF	WAL	Owen Hesketh
15	MF	ENG	Taylor Perry
16	MF	GER	Meritan Shabani
Coach: (England) Jamie Collins

== See also ==
- 2021–22 Professional U23 Development League
- 2021–22 FA Youth Cup
