= Jamie Andrews =

English footballer (born 2002)

Personal information
- Full name: Jamie Andrews
- Date of birth: 19 September 2002 (age 24)
- Place of birth: Solihull, England
- Position: Central midfielder

Team information
- Current team: Solihull Moors

Youth career
- –2021: West Bromwich Albion

Senior career*
Years	Team	Apps	(Gls)
2021–2024	West Bromwich Albion	0	(0)
2021–2022	→ Leamington (loan)	3	(0)
2022–2023	→ Yeovil Town (loan)	8	(0)
2023–2024	→ Grimsby Town (loan)	32	(1)
2024–2026	Woking	87	(5)
2026–	Solihull Moors	0	(0)
- * Club domestic league appearances and goals as of 10:46, 27 June 2026 (UTC)

Jamie Andrews (born 19 September 2002) is an English professional footballer who plays as a central midfielder for National League club Soihull Moors.

== Club career ==
=== West Bromwich Albion ===
Andrews signed his first professional contract with West Bromwich Albion on 6 July 2021, penning a two-year deal.

On 21 December 2021, Andrews signed for National League North side Leamington on a short-term loan.

On 31 October 2022, Andrews signed for National League side Yeovil Town on a short-term loan.

Andrews made his professional debut for the Albion on 17 January 2023 in an FA Cup third round replay against Chesterfield starting in a 4–0 victory.

On 28 August 2023, Andrews joined Grimsby Town on a season-long loan.

Andrews scored his first professional goal for Grimsby on 14 November 2023 in a 7–2 win against Slough Town in an FA Cup First Round Replay at Blundell Park.

In May 2024, West Bromwich Albion announced that Andrews would depart the club upon the expiration of his contract.

=== Woking ===
On 26 July 2024, Andrews joined National League side Woking following his release from West Bromwich Albion.

He departed the club upon the expiry of his contract at the end of the 2025–26 season.

=== Solihull Moors ===
On 26 June 2026, Andrews joined fellow National League club Solihull Moors.

== Career statistics ==
As of match played 25 April 2026.

Appearances and goals by club, season and competition
Club	Season	League			FA Cup		League Cup (Note: Includes appearances in the EFL Cup and National League Cup)		Other		Total	
Club	Season	Division	Apps	Goals	Apps	Goals	Apps	Goals	Apps	Goals	Apps	Goals
West Bromwich Albion	2021–22	Championship	0	0	0	0	0	0	—		0	0
West Bromwich Albion	2022–23	Championship	0	0	1	0	0	0	—		1	0
West Bromwich Albion	2023–24	Championship	0	0	0	0	0	0	—		0	0
West Bromwich Albion	Total		0	0	1	0	0	0	0	0	1	0
Leamington (loan)	2021–22	National League North	3	0	0	0	—		0	0	3	0
Yeovil Town (loan)	2022–23	National League	8	0	0	0	—		2 (Note: One appearance in FA Trophy, one appearance in Somerset Premier Cup)	0	10	0
Grimsby Town (loan)	2023–24	League Two	32	0	2	1	0	0	3 (Note: Appearances in EFL Trophy)	0	37	1
Woking	2024–25	National League	43	1	2	0	3	0	5 (Note: Appearances in FA Trophy)	1	53	2
Woking	2025–26	National League	44	4	2	0	0	0	7 (Note: Four appearances in National League Cup, Three appearances in FA Trophy)	1	53	5
Woking	Total		87	5	4	0	3	0	12	2	106	7
Career total			130	5	7	1	3	0	17	2	157	8

== Honours ==
=== West Bromwich Albion ===
- Premier League Cup winner: 2021–22
