= Toby King =

Toby King may refer to:

- Toby King (footballer, born 1970), Scottish former football midfielder
- Toby King (rugby league) (born 1996), Professional rugby league footballer
- Toby King (footballer, born 2002), English football midfielder
