= Caleb Taylor (footballer) =

English footballer (born 2003)

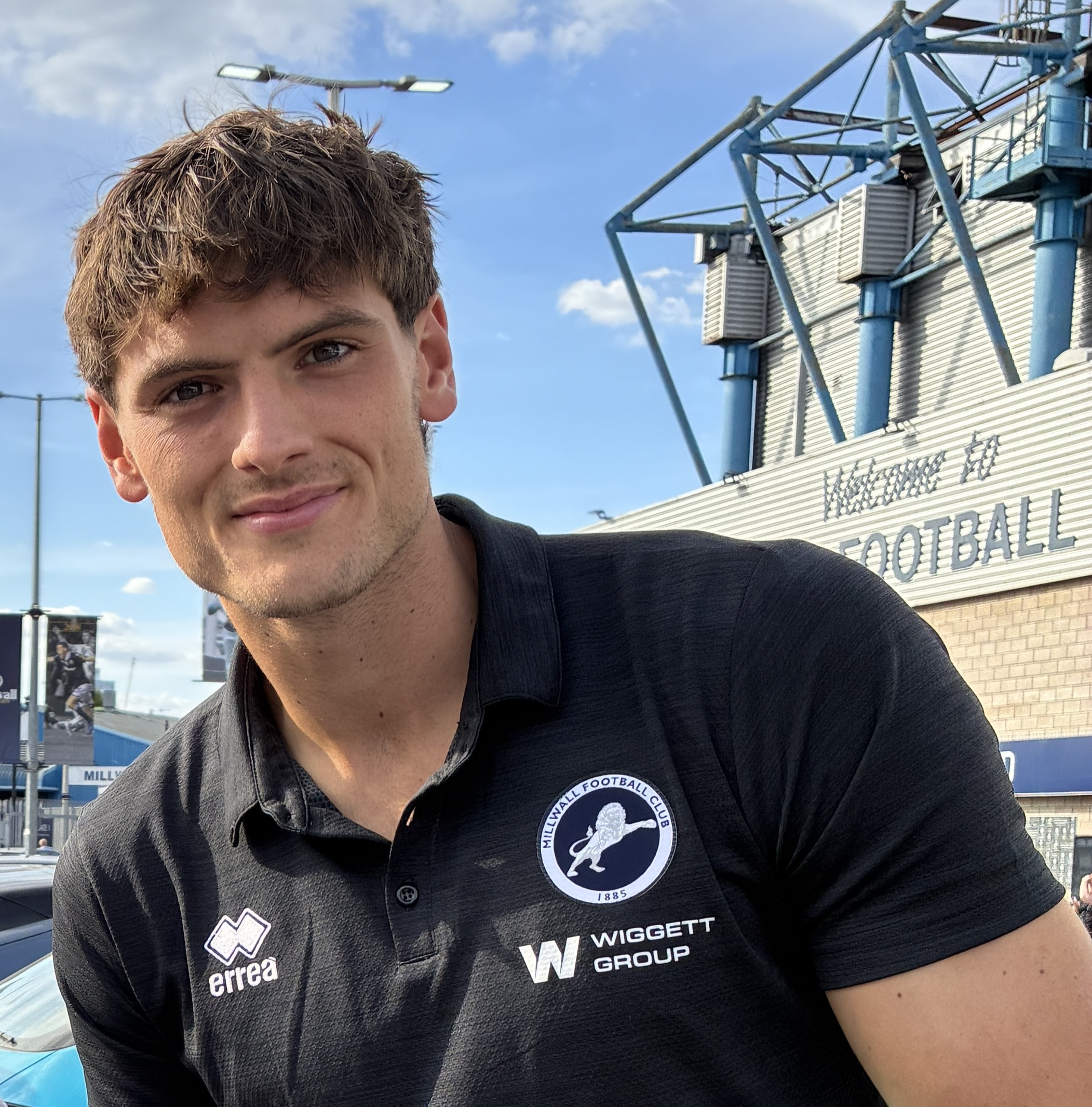
- Caleb Taylor in 2026

Personal information
- Full name: Caleb Joaquin Taylor
- Date of birth: 14 January 2003 (age 23)
- Place of birth: Burnley, England
- Height: 1.96 m (6 ft 5 in)
- Position: Centre-back

Team information
- Current team: Millwall
- Number: 6

Youth career
- 2012–2021: West Bromwich Albion

Senior career*
Years	Team	Apps	(Gls)
2021–2025	West Bromwich Albion	4	(0)
2022–2023	→ Cheltenham Town (loan)	45	(2)
2024	→ Bolton Wanderers (loan)	7	(0)
2024–2025	→ Wycombe Wanderers (loan)	19	(1)
2025	→ Wycombe Wanderers (loan)	17	(2)
2025–	Millwall	33	(4)
- * Club domestic league appearances and goals as of 6 September 2026 (UTC)

Caleb Joaquin Taylor (born 14 January 2003) is an English professional footballer who plays as a centre-back for EFL Championship club Millwall.

== Early and personal life ==
Born in Burnley, Taylor is the son of former Birmingham City and Blackburn Rovers centre-back Martin Taylor. After his father signed for Birmingham City in 2004, the family moved to Dorridge, West Midlands, where Caleb spent the entirety of his childhood.

== Career ==
=== West Bromwich Albion ===
Taylor joined West Bromwich Albion's academy at under-10 level. Taylor was named in their matchday squad for the first time on 9 May 2021 for a 3–1 defeat to Arsenal. On 25 August 2021, Taylor made his debut, starting in a 6–0 defeat against Arsenal. After Robert Snodgrass' substitution in the 74th minute, Taylor was given the captains armband, captaining the side until his substitution in the 82nd minute. On 13 August 2024, Taylor started as the team's captain for the first time in a 2-1 away defeat against Fleetwood Town in the Carabao cup first round. After being recalled from his loan at Wycombe, Taylor scored his first goal for West Brom in a defeat against Bournemouth in the F.A. Cup 3rd Round on 11 January 2025.

==== Loan spells ====
On 22 July 2022, Taylor joined EFL League One club Cheltenham Town on a season-long loan deal. Taylor made his debut for the Robins on 30 July 2022 coming on as a sub in the 75th minute against Peterborough United in a 3–2 defeat. Taylor scored his first goal for the Robins in a 3–2 defeat to Derby County on 14 January 2023, also grabbing an assist. It was also on the same day as his 20th birthday.

On 1 February 2024, he joined Bolton Wanderers on loan, making his debut for the Trotters two days later in a 1-1 draw with Barnsley at the Toughsheet Community Stadium.

Taylor signed a new four-year deal with West Brom in July 2024. He joined League One club Wycombe Wanderers on a season long loan on 30 August 2024. Having impressed over the first half of the season, Taylor was recalled from his loan spell on 2 January 2025 with Wycombe sitting top of the league. Having made one appearance for West Bromwich Albion, scoring a consolation in a 5–1 FA Cup defeat to AFC Bournemouth, he returned to Wycombe Wanderers for the remainder of the season on 29 January 2025.

=== Millwall ===
On 29 August 2025, Taylor joined Millwall on a long-term contract for an undisclosed fee. He made his debut for the club on 30 August 2025, in a 2–0 defeat to Wrexham. He scored his first goal for the club on 29 November 2025, in a 3–2 win against Southampton.

== Career statistics ==
As of match played 5 September 2026

Appearances and goals by club, season and competition
Club	Season	League			FA Cup		League Cup		Other		Total	
Club	Season	Division	Apps	Goals	Apps	Goals	Apps	Goals	Apps	Goals	Apps	Goals
West Bromwich Albion U23	2020–21	—			—		—		2 (Note: Appearances in EFL Trophy)	0	2	0
West Bromwich Albion	2021–22	Championship	1	0	1	0	1	0	0	0	3	0
West Bromwich Albion	2022–23	Championship	0	0	0	0	0	0	0	0	0	0
West Bromwich Albion	2023–24	Championship	3	0	2	0	1	0	0	0	6	0
West Bromwich Albion	2024–25	Championship	0	0	1	1	1	0	0	0	2	1
West Bromwich Albion	2025–26	Championship	0	0	0	0	1	0	—		1	0
West Bromwich Albion	Total		4	0	4	1	4	0	0	0	12	1
Cheltenham Town (loan)	2022–23	League One	45	2	1	0	0	0	3	0	49	2
Bolton Wanderers (loan)	2023–24	League One	7	0	—		—		—		7	0
Wycombe Wanderers (loan)	2024–25	League One	36	3	0	0	0	0	3 (Note: Two appearances in the EFL League One play-offs, one appearance in the EFL Trophy)	0	39	3
Millwall	2025–26	Championship	28	3	0	0	2	0	0	0	30	3
Millwall	2026–27	Championship	5	1	0	0	1	0	0	0	6	1
Millwall	Total		33	4	0	0	3	0	0	0	36	4
Career total			125	9	5	1	7	0	8	0	145	10

== Honours ==
West Bromwich Albion U23

- Premier League Cup winner: 2021–22
