= Rudy (footballer) =

Angolan footballer (born 1989)

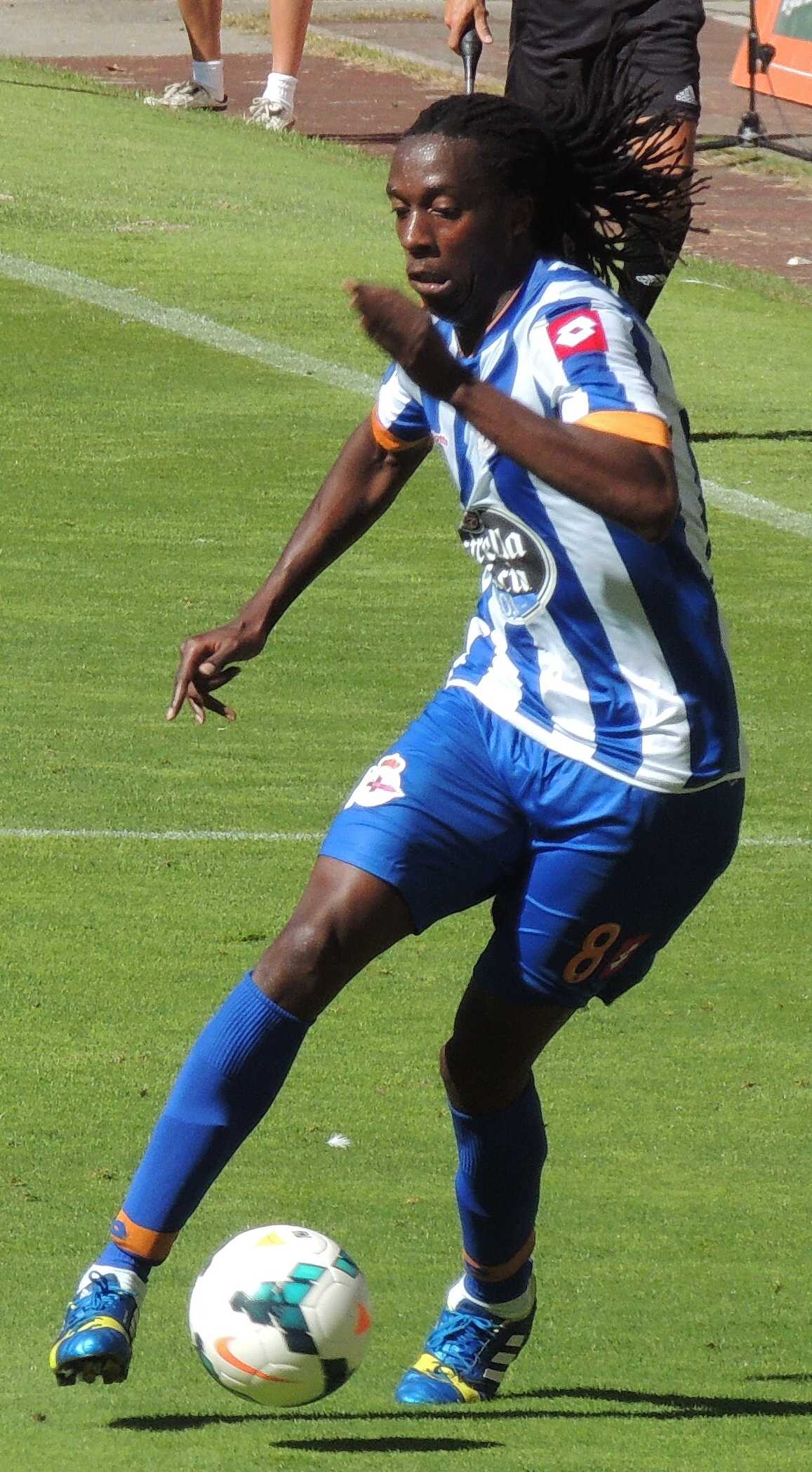
- Rudy playing for Deportivo in 2013

Personal information
- Full name: Carlos Wilson Cachicote da Rocha
- Date of birth: 5 January 1989 (age 37)
- Place of birth: Oeiras, Lisbon, Portugal
- Height: 1.87 m (6 ft 2 in)
- Positions: Attacking midfielder; forward

Team information
- Current team: Brightlingsea Regent

Youth career
- 2002–2003: Belenenses
- 2003–2004: Algés
- 2004–2005: Atlético
- 2005–2006: Oeiras
- 2006–2007: Tires
- 2007–2008: Tourizense

Senior career*
Years	Team	Apps	(Gls)
2008–2009	Linda-a-Velha		
2009–2010	Praiense	22	(1)
2010–2011	Atlético	32	(10)
2011–2013	Cercle Brugge	66	(16)
2013–2014	Deportivo La Coruña	18	(0)
2014	→ Belenenses (loan)	5	(0)
2014	Skoda Xanthi	7	(0)
2015	Libolo	15	(0)
2016–2017	Doxa	35	(3)
2018	União Madeira	7	(0)
2018	Waterford	3	(0)
2020–2021	Sernache	0	(0)
2021–	Basildon	2	(0)

International career^{‡}
2014–2017	Angola	9	(0)
- * Club domestic league appearances and goals as of 12:00, 9 November 2018 (UTC) ‡ National team caps and goals as of 10 June 2017

Carlos Wilson Cachicote da Rocha (born 5 January 1989), commonly known as Rudy, is a professional footballer who plays as an attacking midfielder or a forward for Basildon. Born in Portugal, he played for the Angola national team.

== Club career ==
Born in Oeiras, Lisbon District, Rudy played lower league football until the age of 22, his first stop being with Sporting Clube Linda-a-Velha in the Lisbon regional championships. In 2011, he signed with Cercle Brugge, scoring 13 goals in 33 matches in his first season to help his team to the seventh position in the Belgian Pro League as well as the UEFA Europa League final playoff, lost to Gent; he found the net in only his second appearance, a 1–1 home draw against R.A.E.C. Mons.

Rudy joined Deportivo de La Coruña from Spain in summer 2013, as a free agent. He returned to Portugal a few months afterwards, being loaned to former youth club Os Belenenses and making his Primeira Liga debut on 8 February 2014 in a 2–0 away loss to C.D. Nacional (65 minutes played).

In August 2014, Rudy's Deportivo contract was cancelled by mutual consent and he moved to Greek side Skoda Xanthi. Late in the year, he returned to the land of his ancestors and joined C.R.D. Libolo.

After a year in the Cypriot First Division with Doxa Katokopias, Rudy joined C.F. União of Portugal's LigaPro on an 18-month deal on 5 January 2018. In July that year, he switched to Waterford F.C. in the League of Ireland Premier Division, on an undisclosed contract.

== International career ==
Rudy's mother was Angolan, and his father hailed from São Tomé and Príncipe. He chose to represent the former national team internationally, and accepted a callup for a pair of games in May 2014.

In July 2014, Rudy was asked to switch his international allegiance to Angola. He made his international debut in a friendly with Ethiopia on 3 August, playing the final 30 minutes in a 1–0 win at the Estádio 11 de Novembro.

== Personal life ==
His brothers, the late Quévin Castro, Valter Rocha and Aires, were also footballers.
