= Ethan Ingram =

English footballer (born 2003)

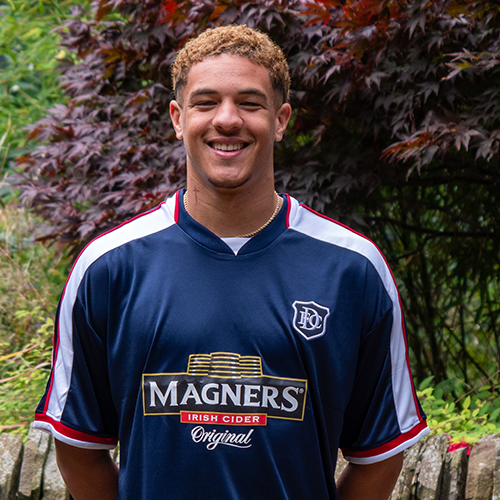
- Ingram in 2024

Personal information
- Full name: Ethan John Ingram
- Date of birth: 16 April 2003 (age 23)
- Place of birth: Gloucester, England
- Height: 6 ft 1 in (1.85 m)
- Position: Defender · right back

Team information
- Current team: Partick Thistle
- Number: 17

Youth career
- 2015–2021: West Bromwich Albion

Senior career*
Years	Team	Apps	(Gls)
2021–2024	West Bromwich Albion	0	(0)
2023–2024	→ Salford City (loan)	23	(1)
2024–2026	Dundee	27	(0)
2026	→ Partick Thistle (loan)	10	(0)
2026–	Partick Thistle	11	(0)

International career^{‡}
2020	England U17	3	(0)
2021	England U18	1	(0)
2022	England U20	3	(0)
- * Club domestic league appearances and goals as of 18:36, 21 November 2026 (UTC) ‡ National team caps and goals as of 20:22, 27 September 2022 (UTC)

Ethan John Ingram (born 16 April 2003) is an English professional footballer who plays as a defender for Scottish Championship club Partick Thistle. Ingram came through the West Bromwich Albion youth academy, and has previously played for Salford City and Dundee.

== Club career ==
=== West Bromwich Albion ===
Born in Gloucester, Ingram was scouted by one of West Bromwich Albion's development centre's aged 12, before joining their academy, signing his first scholarship deal aged 16. He made his debut for the club on 25 August 2021, starting in a 6–0 EFL Cup second round defeat to Arsenal. Ingram scored the winning penalty in the final of the 2021–22 Premier League Cup as West Brom beat Wolverhampton Wanderers U23 5–4 on penalties after a 2–2 draw.

==== Salford City (loan) ====
On 1 September 2023, Ingram joined EFL League Two club Salford City on a season-long loan. He made his debut for the club on 5 September 2023, in a 3–0 defeat away to Bolton Wanderers in the EFL Trophy. He scored his first goal for the club on 21 October 2023, in a 2–2 draw with Swindon Town in a League Two match.

=== Dundee ===
On 4 July 2024, Ingram joined Scottish Premiership club Dundee on a two-year deal. Ingram made his debut for the Dark Blues in a 1–7 away victory over Bonnyrigg Rose in the Scottish League Cup group stage. Ingram scored his first goal for the club three days later in an away win over Arbroath.

=== Partick Thistle ===
In February 2026, Ingram joined Scottish Championship club Partick Thistle on loan until the end of the season. Ingram made ten appearances for the club, avoiding defeat in all ten games. At the end of the season Ingram departed Dundee.

Following his loan spell, Ingram signed permanently for Partick Thistle in July 2026, agreeing a two-year deal with the club.

== International career ==
He has represented England at under-17 and under-18 international levels.

On 21 September 2022, Ingram made his England U20 debut as a substitute during a 3–0 victory over Chile at the Pinatar Arena.

== Career statistics ==
As of match played 29 August 2026

Appearances and goals by club, season and competition
Club	Season	League			National cup (Note: Includes FA Cup, Scottish Cup)		League cup (Note: Includes EFL Cup, Scottish League Cup)		Other		Total	
Club	Season	Division	Apps	Goals	Apps	Goals	Apps	Goals	Apps	Goals	Apps	Goals
West Bromwich Albion	2021–22	Championship	0	0	0	0	1	0	—		1	0
West Bromwich Albion	2022–23	Championship	0	0	0	0	1	0	—		1	0
West Bromwich Albion	2023–24	Championship	0	0	0	0	1	0	—		1	0
West Bromwich Albion	Total		0	0	0	0	3	0	0	0	3	0
Salford City	2023–24	League Two	23	1	2	0	0	0	1 (Note: Appearance(s) in the EFL Trophy.)	0	26	1
Dundee	2024–25	Scottish Premiership	24	0	1	0	6	1	—		31	1
Dundee	2025–26	Scottish Premiership	3	0	1	0	4	0	—		8	0
Dundee	Total		27	0	2	0	10	1	0	0	39	1
Dundee B	2025–26	—			—		—		1 (Note: Appearance(s) in the Scottish Challenge Cup)	0	1	0
Partick Thistle (loan)	2025–26	Scottish Championship	10	0	—		—		0	0	10	0
Partick Thistle	2026–27	Scottish Championship	3	0	0	0	1	0	0	0	4	0
Career total			63	1	4	0	14	1	2	0	83	2

== Honours ==
West Bromwich Albion U23

- Premier League Cup: 2021–22
