= Rico Richards =

English footballer (born 2003)

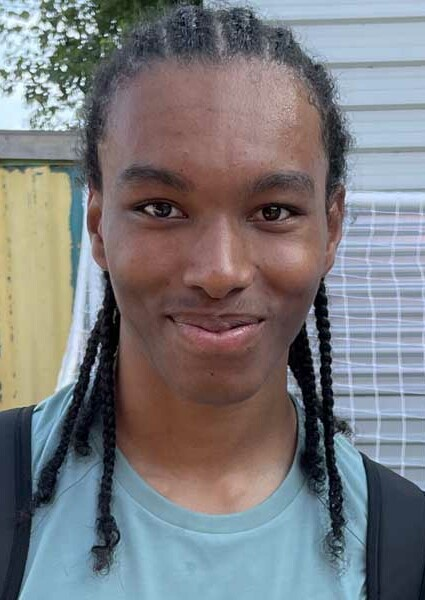
- Richards in July 2022

Personal information
- Full name: Rico Dean Scott Richards
- Date of birth: 27 September 2003 (age 23)
- Place of birth: West Bromwich, England
- Height: 6 ft 0 in (1.82 m)
- Position: Midfielder

Team information
- Current team: Southend United
- Number: 21

Youth career
- 2010–2020: West Bromwich Albion

Senior career*
Years	Team	Apps	(Gls)
2020–2023	West Bromwich Albion	1	(0)
2023–2025	Aston Villa	0	(0)
2024	→ Stockport County (loan)	11	(1)
2024–2025	→ Port Vale (loan)	27	(3)
2025–2026	Port Vale	1	(0)
2025–2026	→ Walsall (loan)	10	(0)
2026–	Southend United	0	(0)

International career
2019	England U16	4	(1)
2019	England U17	3	(1)
2020	England U18	2	(0)
- * Club domestic league appearances and goals as of 11:05, 31 July 2026 (UTC)

Rico Dean Scott Richards (born 27 September 2003) is an English professional footballer who plays as a midfielder for National League club Southend United. He has represented England up to under-18 level.

Richards is a product of the Academy at West Bromwich Albion, where he turned professional in August 2020. He played two matches for the club before he joined Aston Villa on a free transfer in July 2023. He spent the second half of the 2023–24 season on loan at Stockport County, who finished as champions of League Two. He was loaned out to Port Vale for the 2024–25 season, where he won another League Two promotion, and he joined the club permanently in June 2025. He then joined Walsall on a season-long loan and was sold to Southend United in July 2026.

== Club career ==
=== West Bromwich Albion ===
Richards joined the youth academy of West Bromwich Albion as a seven-year-old and signed his first professional (three-year) contract with the club in August 2020. Both Manchester United and local rivals Aston Villa had attempted to sign him to a professional contract before he opted to pledge his future to the Albion. Academy manager Richard Stevens described him as an "elite talent, in the same bracket as Morgan Rogers, Izzy Brown and Tyler Roberts". He was first named on the first-team bench by Slaven Bilić in January 2020. He helped Albion to reach the semi-finals of the FA Youth Cup in 2021. He made his senior debut for West Brom on 25 August 2021, starting in a 6–0 EFL Cup second round defeat to Arsenal at The Hawthorns in a game where manager Valérien Ismaël blooded a lot of young talent against an experienced Gunners team. He helped the youth team to win the Premier League Cup at the end of the 2021–22 campaign, though in the final he missed his penalty in the shoot-out against Black Country rivals Wolverhampton Wanderers.

Richards made his Championship debut for the club on 3 March 2023, coming on as a substitute in the 80th minute in a 2–0 loss away at Hull City. He said afterwards he was grateful to manager Carlos Corberán for the opportunity. He ended the 2022–23 season with four goals and five assists from 20 games for the under-21 side.

=== Aston Villa ===
On 3 July 2023, Richards signed a two-year contract with Aston Villa after joining on a free transfer after the expiry of his West Bromwich Albion contract. On 18 January 2024, he joined League Two leaders Stockport County on loan until the end of the 2023–24 season. Fellow Villan Louie Barry was already on loan at Edgeley Park. He initially made only cameo appearances, with manager Dave Challinor commenting on his initial shyness and apparent lack of confidence, though he found greater first-team opportunities following an injury to Barry. On 29 March, Richards scored his first goal in senior football, in a 3–0 league victory at Forest Green Rovers. He made three starts and eight substitute appearances, helping the Hatters to win promotion as champions of League Two.

=== Port Vale ===
On 30 August 2024, Richards returned to League Two on a season-long loan with Port Vale. Speaking in December, manager Darren Moore said that he was "really pleased with the way he has been progressing and the opportunities he gives us as a team through his intelligence and his directness" and that "over the first half of the season he has been getting stronger" as he utilised Richards primarily as a substitute. He was largely absent from the first-team in January and February owing to a niggling knee injury. He finished the 2024–25 season with four goals in 32 games, helping the club to secure an automatic promotion place. He was released by Aston Villa upon the expiry of his contract on 30 June, after which he joined Port Vale on a two-year deal.

On 1 September 2025, Richards returned to League Two on a season-long loan at Walsall. He played just 37 league minutes in his first three months, though was told to be ready to play by manager Mat Sadler. He played 14 times for Walsall in the 2025–26 season, of which only one was a league start. He returned to Vale Park to find himself transfer listed.

=== Southend United ===
On 31 July 2026, Richards joined National League club Southend United for an undisclosed fee on a two-year contract, with a club option of a third year. He said that head coach Kieron Dyer could "teach me a few things" and "the main goal is promotion, but I like to get myself on the scoresheet, get some assists, and show off what I can do". He picked up an injury at the start of the 2026–27 season.

== International career ==
Richards has represented England at under-16, under-17 and under-18 international levels. He also trained with the under-19 squad, though the COVID-19 pandemic in Europe limited the number of fixtures available.

== Style of play ==
Richards is a midfielder with a low centre of gravity and excellent dribbling ability.

== Career statistics ==
As of match played 11 April 2026

Appearances and goals by club, season and competition
Club	Season	League			FA Cup		EFL Cup		Other		Total	
Club	Season	Division	Apps	Goals	Apps	Goals	Apps	Goals	Apps	Goals	Apps	Goals
West Bromwich Albion U21	2020–21	—			—		—		2 (Note: Appearances in EFL Trophy)	0	2	0
West Bromwich Albion	2021–22	Championship	0	0	0	0	1	0	—		1	0
West Bromwich Albion	2022–23	Championship	1	0	0	0	0	0	—		1	0
West Bromwich Albion	Total		1	0	0	0	1	0	0	0	2	0
Aston Villa U21	2023–24	—			—		—		3	1	3	1
Stockport County (loan)	2023–24	League Two	11	1	—		—		—		11	1
Port Vale (loan)	2024–25	League Two	27	3	1	0	—		4	1	32	4
Port Vale	2025–26	League One	1	0	0	0	1	0	0	0	2	0
Port Vale	Total		28	3	1	0	1	0	4	1	34	4
Walsall (loan)	2025–26	League Two	10	0	0	0	—		4	2	14	2
Southend United	2026–27	National League	0	0	0	0	—		0	0	0	0
Career total			50	4	1	0	2	0	13	4	66	8

== Honours ==
West Bromwich Albion U23

- Premier League Cup: 2021–22

Stockport County

- EFL League Two: 2023–24

Port Vale

- EFL League Two second-place promotion: 2024–25
