= Quévin Castro =

Portuguese footballer (2001–2026)

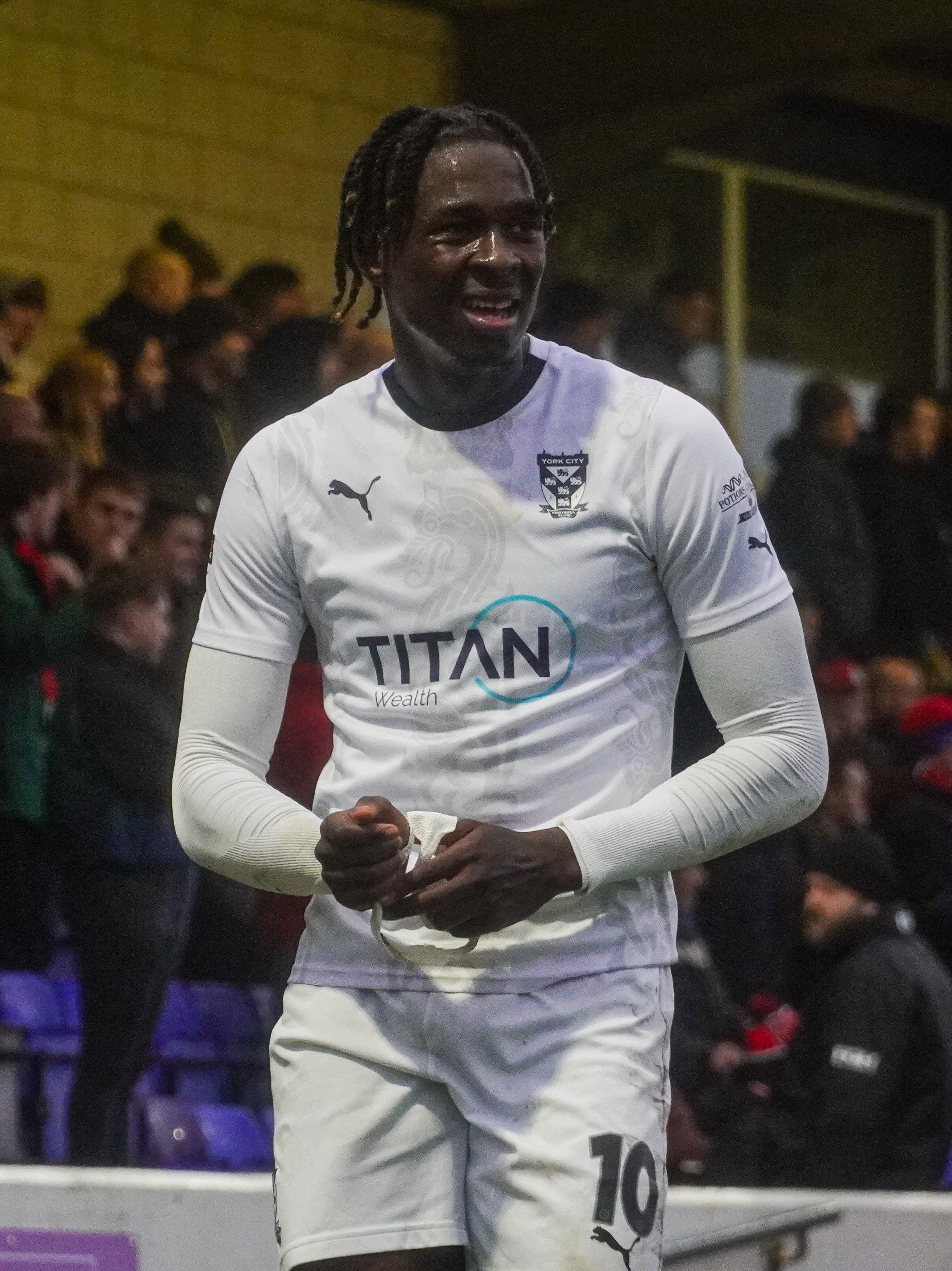
- Castro with York City in 2023

Personal information
- Full name: Quévin Moisés Cachicote da Rocha de Castro
- Date of birth: 16 August 2001
- Place of birth: Linda-a-Velha, Lisbon, Portugal
- Date of death: 22 August 2026 (aged 25)
- Place of death: Malveira, Lisbon, Portugal
- Height: 1.93 m (6 ft 4 in)
- Position: Central midfielder

Youth career
- Sporting CP Youth Academy

Senior career*
Years	Team	Apps	(Gls)
2017–2019	Thetford Town	43	(2)
2019	Mildenhall Town	3	(0)
2019	Leiston	3	(1)
2020	Bury Town	2	(0)
2020	Norwich CBS	4	(2)
2021–2023	West Bromwich Albion	2	(0)
2022	→ Burton Albion (loan)	3	(0)
2022–2023	→ Notts County (loan)	14	(4)
2023	→ Gateshead (loan)	1	(0)
2023–2024	York City	14	(1)
2024	→ King's Lynn Town (loan)	8	(1)
2025	Chippenham Town	8	(0)
2025–2026	Cambridge City	18	(3)
2026	Eastbourne Borough	6	(3)
2026	Real Sport Clube	0	(0)
Total		129	(17)
- * Club domestic league appearances and goals

Quévin Moisés Cachicote da Rocha de Castro (16 August 2001 – 22 August 2026) was a Portuguese professional footballer who played as a central midfielder.

== Early and personal life ==
Castro was born in Linda-a-Velha, Lisbon, to a Santomean father and an Angolan mother. His brothers Rudy, Valter Rocha, and Aires are also footballers. Castro played in the academy at Sporting CP before moving to England, where he grew up in Thetford, Norfolk, and attended the Thetford Academy.

== Career ==
Castro played non-league football for Mildenhall Town, Thetford Town, Norwich CBS, Leiston and Bury Town during his early career. Castro had trial spells at Ipswich Town in 2019 and later in 2020, and also spent time on trial at Sutton United, Arsenal, Chelsea and West Bromwich Albion.

In summer 2021, Castro signed for EFL Championship club West Bromwich Albion on a two-year contract following his trial at the club. He made his debut for the club on 25 August 2021, starting in a 6–0 EFL Cup second round defeat to Arsenal. Castro made his first of two league appearances for West Brom on 28 February 2022, as a substitute in a 2–0 Championship defeat to Swansea City.

On 14 July 2022, Castro joined League One side Burton Albion on a season-long loan. Castro had his loan terminated by mutual consent on 1 September. On 12 September 2022, Castro joined National League club Notts County on loan until 8 January 2023. Upon the expiration of his contract, he joined fellow National League club Gateshead on loan until the end of the season.

On 28 June 2023, it was announced that Castro would sign with National League side York City following the expiration of his West Bromwich Albion contract.

On 19 January 2024, he joined National League North side King's Lynn on an initial month's loan. He made his debut, as a substitute, the day after he joined in a 2-2 league draw against Hereford.

Castro's York contract was cancelled in May 2024.

He joined Chippenham Town in July 2025, but his contract was mutually terminated in October, and the following month, he joined Isthmian League North Division club Cambridge City.

Castro signed for Eastbourne Borough in March 2026.

On 29 June 2026, Castro returned to Portugal to sign for Real Sport Clube, but died prior to making an official appearance for the club.

== Style of play ==
Castro was described as an "energetic and powerful central midfielder".

== Death ==
On 22 August 2026, six days after his 25th birthday, Castro collapsed during a pre-season friendly between Real Sport Clube and Estrela da Amadora at the Estádio das Seixas in Malveira, near Lisbon. Emergency cardiac defibrillation treatment was unsuccessful, and he died before reaching the hospital.

== Career statistics ==
Appearances and goals by club, season and competition
Club	Season	League			FA Cup		EFL Cup		Other		Total	
Club	Season	Division	Apps	Goals	Apps	Goals	Apps	Goals	Apps	Goals	Apps	Goals
Leiston	2019–20	Southern League Premier Division Central	3	1	1	0	—		1 (Note: Appearance(s) in Southern League Cup)	1	5	2
Bury Town	2019–20	Isthmian League North Division	2	0	0	0	—		0	0	2	0
West Bromwich Albion	2021–22	EFL Championship	2	0	0	0	1	0	0	0	3	0
West Bromwich Albion	2022–23	EFL Championship	0	0	0	0	0	0	0	0	0	0
West Bromwich Albion	Total		2	0	0	0	1	0	0	0	3	0
Burton Albion (loan)	2022–23	EFL League One	3	0	0	0	1	0	1 (Note: Appearance(s) in EFL Trophy)	0	5	0
Notts County (loan)	2022–23	National League	14	4	1	0	—		0	0	15	4
Gateshead (loan)	2022–23	National League	1	0	0	0	—		1 (Note: Appearance(s) in FA Trophy)	0	2	0
York City	2023–24	National League	14	1	2	0	—		1	0	17	1
King's Lynn Town (loan)	2023–24	National League North	8	1	—		—		0	0	8	1
Chippenham Town	2025–26	National League South	8	0	1	0	—		0	0	9	0
Cambridge City	2025–26	Isthmian League North Division	18	3	0	0	—		0	0	18	3
Eastbourne Borough	2025–26	National League South	6	3	0	0	—		1 (Note: Appearance(s) in Sussex Senior Cup)	0	7	3
Career total			79	13	5	0	2	0	5	1	91	14

== Honours ==
West Bromwich Albion U23

- Premier League Cup: 2021–22
