= Mo Faal =

Gambian footballer (born 2003)

Personal information
- Full name: Modou Lamin Faal
- Date of birth: 11 February 2003 (age 23)
- Place of birth: The Gambia
- Height: 6 ft 5 in (1.96 m)
- Position: Forward

Team information
- Current team: Port Vale (on loan from Wrexham)
- Number: 9

Youth career
- 2018–2019: Sutton Coldfield Town
- 2019–2021: West Bromwich Albion

Senior career*
| Years | Team | Apps | (Gls) |
| 2021–2024 | West Bromwich Albion | 1 | (0) |
| 2022 | → Hereford (loan) | 4 | (1) |
| 2022 | → AFC Telford United (loan) | 6 | (0) |
| 2022–2023 | → AFC Fylde (loan) | 16 | (10) |
| 2023–2024 | → Doncaster Rovers (loan) | 25 | (7) |
| 2024 | → Walsall (loan) | 20 | (6) |
| 2024– | Wrexham | 8 | (0) |
| 2025–2026 | → Port Vale (loan) | 13 | (0) |
| 2026 | → Cheltenham Town (loan) | 8 | (1) |
| 2026– | → Port Vale (loan) | 2 | (0) |
- * Club domestic league appearances and goals as of 17:00, 23 August 2026 (UTC)

Modou Lamin Faal (born 11 February 2003) is a Gambian professional footballer who plays as a forward for EFL League Two club Port Vale, on loan from EFL Championship club Wrexham.

Faal moved from The Gambia to Birmingham, England, at the age of seven. He was spotted by West Bromwich Albion playing for Sutton Coldfield Town. He joined the West Brom Academy in 2019. He made his professional debut in August 2021. He had five loan spells in three seasons, playing for Hereford, AFC Telford United, AFC Fylde, Doncaster Rovers, and Walsall. He was named National League North Player of the Month in February 2023 during Fylde's National League North title-winning season. He was signed for a club record £500,000 fee by Wrexham in August 2024. After Wrexham were promoted from League One at the end of the 2024–25 season, he returned to the division on loan with Port Vale in August 2025 and then to League Two with Cheltenham Town in February 2026. He returned to Port Vale on a season-long loan for 2026–27.

== Early life ==
Faal was born in The Gambia but relocated to Birmingham, England, with his family when he was seven years old. He aspired to play for the Gambia national football team.

== Club career ==
=== West Bromwich Albion ===
Faal joined the Academy at West Bromwich Albion in November 2019, at the age of 16, after impressing during a two-week trial. He had been scouted while playing local football for Sutton Coldfield Town in Birmingham. He made an early impression and became the first scholar in West Brom history to play for the U-23's, featuring in a number of matches for Deon Burton's side during the 2020–21 campaign. He was also a regular fixture in Albion's U-18 side and enjoyed a prolific season, scoring seven goals. This earned him a call-up to train with the Baggies' first team under manager Valérien Ismaël. He agreed a new contract with the club.

Faal made his professional debut on 25 August 2021, coming on as a substitute for Kenneth Zohore, in a 6–0 loss to Arsenal in the second round of the EFL Cup. On 5 March 2022, he signed for National League North side Hereford on a one-month loan deal. He scored two goals in five games for Josh Gowling's Bulls. He scored regularly for Richard Beale's West Brom Premier League 2 team and scored a goal against Wolverhampton Wanderers in the Premier League Cup final victory.

On 28 October 2022, he joined AFC Telford United on loan. He played six National League North games for Kevin Wilkin's "Bucks". On 2 December 2022, Faal moved to AFC Fylde of the National League North on a one-month loan deal; manager Adam Murray had previously coached Faal at The Hawthorns. He scored a brace on his debut to secure a 2–1 win at Gloucester City. The loan was later extended until the end of the 2022–23 season as director of football Chris Beech praised his "immediate impact". He was recalled by West Brom on 6 March 2023. His performances before his recall saw him win the February National League North Player of the Month award having scored five goals across the month and scoring a total of 10 goals in the 16 games during his full spell at Mill Farm. AFC Fylde were promoted as National League North champions at the end of the season. He signed a new two-year deal with West Brom in July 2023.

On 11 August 2023, Faal joined League Two club Doncaster Rovers on a season-long loan deal. On 3 October, he was listed in the top five performers of the League Two weekend after having scored one goal, won five aerial duels and provided one key pass in a 2–0 win over Crawley Town. He was named in the League Two Team of the Week 11 days later as he scored and put in an excellent all-round performance in a 4–1 victory over Sutton United. On 13 January 2024, he returned to his parent club with Rovers manager Grant McCann expressing his disappointment in the way that the striker had used his representatives to end the loan at the break period. McCann had previously praised Faal for his progress at the Eco-Power Stadium, and later said there were no hard feelings over his exit. On 15 January 2024, Faal returned to League Two with Walsall on loan until the end of the 2023–24 season. Walsall were eight points and seven places above Rovers. He had a slow start to his time at the Bescot Stadium, being restricted to cameo appearances. Manager Mat Sadler compared him to Elijah Adebayo. At the end of the season Walsall finished in 11th place, with Rovers leap frogging them and finishing in 5th place. Faal scored 13 combined league goals from his spell at Rovers and Walsall.

He was given a chance in the West Brom first team after impressing manager Carlos Corberán during his loan spells away. On 13 August 2024, he scored his first goal in a 2–1 defeat at Fleetwood Town in the EFL Cup first round. He was strongly linked with a move to Barnsley.

=== Wrexham ===
On 30 August 2024, Faal signed a three-year deal (with a further one-year option) for Wrexham after being bought for a £500,000 transfer fee. This made him the club's record signing. He made his debut for the club on 10 September 2024, in a 2–1 win over Salford City in the EFL Trophy. On 8 October, he scored his first goal at the Racecourse Ground in a 3–0 win over Wolverhampton Wanderers U21. Wrexham were promoted out of League One at the end of the 2024–25 campaign, with Faal scoring three goals in 16 games – of which eight were league games, all appearances off the bench without scoring. The Red Dragons were well stocked with attackers, leaving him with limited opportunities to play.

On 7 August 2025, it was announced that Faal joined League One club Port Vale on loan for the 2025–26 season. Wrexham manager Phil Parkinson said that "several League One clubs" had tried to bring Faal in on loan, but that they "we're [now] looking forward to watching him develop under a terrific manager in Darren Moore". He scored four minutes into his debut five days later as he came off the bench 71 minutes into a 1–0 win at Blackpool in the first round of the EFL Cup. New Vale manager, Jon Brady, said in January that he was a fan of the player and had previously tried to sign him whilst he was in charge at Northampton Town. However, he cut the loan spell short on 23 January, with Faal having scored three cup goals in 23 appearances in all competitions. On 2 February, despite still being injured, he joined League Two side Cheltenham Town on loan until the end of the 2025–26 season. Manager Steve Cotterill praised him after Faal came off the bench to score an injury-time winning goal at Whaddon Road against Gillingham on 14 April.

On 8 July 2026, Faal returned to Port Vale, now in League Two, on loan for the 2026–27 season. He played three games before being sidelined with a muscle injury, which saw him ruled out until December. Brady also stated that the fans had unfairly turned on Faal after his penalty miss against Wolverhampton Wanderers, which had caused the player to lose confidence.

== Style of play ==
Faal has been described as a target forward known for his physical presence. Commentators have also noted his pace and unconventional playing style.

== Career statistics ==
As of match played 22 August 2026

Appearances and goals by club, season and competition
| Club | Season | League | | | FA Cup | | EFL Cup | | Other | | Total | |
| Club | Season | Division | Apps | Goals | Apps | Goals | Apps | Goals | Apps | Goals | Apps | Goals |
|---|---|---|---|---|---|---|---|---|---|---|---|---|
| West Bromwich Albion U23 | 2020–21 | — | | | — | | — | | 2 (Note: Appearances in the EFL Trophy) | 0 | 2 | 0 |
| West Bromwich Albion | 2021–22 | Championship | 0 | 0 | 0 | 0 | 1 | 0 | — | | 1 | 0 |
| West Bromwich Albion | 2022–23 | Championship | 1 | 0 | 0 | 0 | 0 | 0 | — | | 1 | 0 |
| West Bromwich Albion | 2023–24 | Championship | 0 | 0 | — | | — | | 0 | 0 | 0 | 0 |
| West Bromwich Albion | 2024–25 | Championship | 0 | 0 | 0 | 0 | 1 | 1 | — | | 1 | 1 |
| West Bromwich Albion | Total | | 1 | 0 | 0 | 0 | 2 | 1 | 0 | 0 | 3 | 1 |
| Hereford (loan) | 2021–22 | National League North | 4 | 1 | — | | — | | — | | 4 | 1 |
| AFC Telford United (loan) | 2022–23 | National League North | 6 | 0 | — | | — | | 1 (Note: Appearance in FA Trophy) | 0 | 7 | 0 |
| AFC Fylde (loan) | 2022–23 | National League North | 16 | 10 | — | | — | | — | | 16 | 10 |
| Doncaster Rovers (loan) | 2023–24 | League Two | 25 | 7 | 3 | 1 | 1 | 0 | 4 | 1 | 33 | 9 |
| Walsall (loan) | 2023–24 | League Two | 20 | 6 | — | | — | | — | | 20 | 6 |
| Wrexham | 2024–25 | League One | 8 | 0 | 1 | 0 | — | | 7 | 3 | 16 | 3 |
| Wrexham | 2025–26 | Championship | 0 | 0 | 0 | 0 | 0 | 0 | — | | 0 | 0 |
| Wrexham | 2026–27 | Championship | 0 | 0 | 0 | 0 | 0 | 0 | — | | 0 | 0 |
| Wrexham | Total | | 8 | 0 | 1 | 0 | 0 | 0 | 7 | 3 | 16 | 3 |
| Port Vale (loan) | 2025–26 | League One | 13 | 0 | 3 | 0 | 2 | 1 | 5 | 2 | 23 | 3 |
| Cheltenham Town (loan) | 2025–26 | League Two | 8 | 1 | — | | — | | — | | 8 | 1 |
| Port Vale (loan) | 2026–27 | League Two | 2 | 0 | 0 | 0 | 1 | 0 | 0 | 0 | 3 | 0 |
| Career total | | | 103 | 25 | 7 | 1 | 6 | 2 | 19 | 6 | 135 | 34 |

== Honours ==
Individual

- National League North Player of the Month: February 2023

West Bromwich Albion U23

- Premier League Cup: 2021–22

AFC Fylde

- National League North: 2022–23

Wrexham

- EFL League One second-place promotion: 2024–25
