= Isaac Westendorf =

German footballer (born 2001)

Personal information
- Date of birth: 18 February 2001 (age 25)
- Place of birth: Bremen, Germany
- Position: Striker

Team information
- Current team: Oxford City
- Number: 9

Youth career
- 2020–2021: Barking
- 2021–2023: Newcastle United

Senior career*
Years	Team	Apps	(Gls)
2023–2024	Larne	14	(0)
2023–2024	→ Ballymena United (loan)	15	(2)
2024–2025	Balzan	23	(1)
2025–	Oxford City	3	(0)
- * Club domestic league appearances and goals as of 26 June 2025

Isaac Westendorf (born 18 February 2001) is a German footballer who plays as a striker for National League South club [Torquay United].

== Career ==
Westendorf played for English side Barking. He was described as "a regular scorer for the East London side, all whilst dealing with the physical nature of non-league". In 2021, he joined the youth academy of English Premier League side Newcastle United. He was described as "a regular for the Magpies’ under-23 side and often trained with Eddie Howe's senior squad". He suffered a thigh injury while playing for the club. In 2023, he signed for Northern Irish side Larne. He helped the club win the league. After that, he was sent on loan to Northern Irish side Ballymena United.

Westendorf signed for Oxford City of the National League North in August 2025. He made his debut on 8 August 2025, against AFC Fylde.

== Style of play ==
Westendorf mainly operates as a striker. He is known for his speed and strength.

== Personal life ==
Westendorf was born in 2001 in Germany to Ghanaian parents, and move to England at 13.
