= Owen Hesketh =

Welsh footballer

Personal information
- Full name: Owen James Michael Hesketh
- Date of birth: 10 October 2002 (age 24)
- Position: Midfielder

Youth career
- -2019: Manchester City
- 2019–2023: Wolverhampton Wanderers

Senior career*
Years	Team	Apps	(Gls)
2023–2024	Wolverhampton Wanderers	0	(0)
2024	→ Kidderminster Harriers (loan)	4	(0)

International career
2019	Wales U17	2	(0)
- * Club domestic league appearances and goals as of 21:47, 28 April 2024 (UTC)

Owen James Michael Hesketh (born 10 October 2002) is a Welsh footballer who plays as a midfielder. He is a Wales youth international.

== Career ==
Hesketh was in the academy at Manchester City before he joined Wolves in July 2019. He signed his first professional contract with Wolves in October 2019, and signed a new two-year deal, with the option of a third in May 2021. In May 2023, he signed a new two-year contract. Hesketh represented Wolves U19 at the Premier League Next Generation Cup in India in May 2023.

In September 2023, he scored for Wolves in the EFL Trophy against Notts County. On 24 December 2023, he was included in the Wolves match-day team, named as a substitute for a Premier League clash against Chelsea.

In January 2024, Hesketh signed for National League side Kidderminster Harriers on loan for the remainder of the 2023-24 season. Hesketh left Wolves in September 2024.

== Style of play ==
An attacking midfield player, his playing style has been compared to former Wolves player Morgan Gibbs-White.

== International career ==
A Wales youth international, Hesketh played for Wales at U-15 level and was part of the 2017-18 U-16 Victory Shield squad. In 2018-19 he played for the U-17 team. He was called up by the Wales national under-21 football team in March 2023.
