= 2021–22 West Bromwich Albion F.C. season =

West Bromwich Albion
2021–22 season
- Chairman: Li Piyue (until 2 February); Lai Guochuan (from 2 February)
- Head coach: Valérien Ismaël (until 2 February); Steve Bruce (from 3 February)
- Stadium: The Hawthorns
- Championship: 10th
- FA Cup: Third round
- EFL Cup: Second round
- Top goalscorer: League: Karlan Grant (18 goals); All: Karlan Grant (18 goals)
Home colours	Away colours	Third colours

The 2021–22 season was West Bromwich Albion's 144th year in their history, and first season back in the Championship, since the 2019–20 season, following relegation in the previous season. Along with the league, the club also competed in the FA Cup and the EFL Cup. The season covered the period from 1 July 2021 to 30 June 2022.

== Managerial changes ==
On 24 June 2021, Valérien Ismaël was appointed as the club's new head coach on a four-year contract after a compensation package with Barnsley was agreed for his services. Ismael then left the club by mutual consent on 2 February, leading to West Brom announcing the arrival of new head coach Steve Bruce on an 18-month deal a day later.

== Pre-season friendlies ==
WBA announced they will play a friendly against Woking, Watford, Walsall and Birmingham City as part of the pre-season preparations.

16 July 2021 Friendly	Woking	0–1	West Bromwich Albion	Woking
19:45 BST		Report	Zohore 90' (pen.)	Stadium: Laithwaite Community Stadium

20 July 2021 Friendly	West Bromwich Albion	2–0	Sheffield Wednesday	Walsall
14:00 BST	Phillips 5', 36'	Report		Stadium: Palm Training Ground; Attendance: 0 (Behind-closed-doors)

24 July 2021 Friendly	Watford	0–0	West Bromwich Albion	Watford
15:00 BST		Report		Stadium: Vicarage Road

27 July 2021 Friendly	Walsall	Cancelled	West Bromwich Albion	Bescot
19:30 BST				Stadium: Banks's Stadium
Note: Match was cancelled due to waterlogged pitch.

31 July 2021 Friendly	Birmingham City	0–4	West Bromwich Albion	Bordesley
15:00 BST		Report	Diangana 50'; Clarke 68'; Grant 72' (pen.); Tulloch 86'	Stadium: St Andrew's Trillion Trophy Stadium

== Competitions ==
=== Championship ===
==== League table ====
Pos	Team	Pld	W	D	L	GF	GA	GD	Pts
7	Middlesbrough	46	20	10	16	59	50	+9	70
8	Blackburn Rovers	46	19	12	15	59	50	+9	69
9	Millwall	46	18	15	13	53	45	+8	69
10	West Bromwich Albion	46	18	13	15	52	45	+7	67
11	Queens Park Rangers	46	19	9	18	60	59	+1	66
12	Coventry City	46	17	13	16	60	59	+1	64
13	Preston North End	46	16	16	14	52	56	−4	64

Source: EFL Official Website
Rules for classification: 1) Points; 2) Goal difference; 3) Number of goals scored; 4) Head-to-head results; 5) Wins; 6) Away goals; 7) Penalty points (sec 9.5); 8) 12-point sending off offences

==== Results summary ====
Overall								Home						Away					
Pld	W	D	L	GF	GA	GD	Pts	W	D	L	GF	GA	GD	W	D	L	GF	GA	GD
46	18	13	15	52	45	+7	67	12	8	3	33	16	+17	6	5	12	19	29	−10

Last updated: 7 May 2022.

==== Results by matchday ====
Matchday	1	2	3	4	5	6	7	8	9	10	11	12	13	14	15	16	17	18	19	20	21	22	23	24	25	26	27	28	29	30	31	32	33	34	35	36	37	38	39	40	41	42	43	44	45	46
Ground	A	H	H	A	A	H	H	A	H	A	A	H	A	H	A	H	H	A	A	H	A	H	A	A	H	A	H	H	A	A	H	A	A	H	A	H	H	A	A	H	H	H	A	H	A	H
Result	D	W	W	W	W	D	D	D	W	W	L	W	L	W	L	W	D	L	D	D	W	W	D	L	D	L	W	L	L	L	D	L	L	L	W	D	W	D	L	W	L	W	L	D	W	W
Position	2	4	1	2	2	1	2	3	2	1	2	2	3	3	3	3	3	3	3	4	3	3	4	4	4	5	5	5	7	9	8	11	13	13	13	14	12	12	12	11	11	11	12	13	10	10

Updated to match(es) played on 7 May 2022. Source: Statto.com
A = Away; H = Home; W = Win; D = Draw; L = Loss

==== Matches ====
WBA's fixtures were confirmed on 24 June 2021.

6 August 2021 1	Bournemouth	2–2	West Bromwich Albion	Kings Park
19:45 BST	Marcondes 12'; Mepham (yellow card) 20'; Billing 52'	Report	O'Shea 33'; Bartley (yellow card) 60'; Robinson 67'; Mowatt (yellow card) 80'; Livermore (yellow card) 86'	Stadium: Vitality Stadium; Attendance: 9,254 (1,219 away); Referee: Dean Whitestone
Note: Live on Sky Sports

14 August 2021 2	West Bromwich Albion	3–2	Luton Town	West Bromwich
15:00 BST	Naismith 5' (o.g.); Mowatt (yellow card) 29'; Robinson 36'; Grant 66'; Zohore (yellow card) 90+5'	Report	Campbell (yellow card) 15'; Cornick 70'; Osho (yellow card) 74'; Mpanzu 90+8'	Stadium: The Hawthorns; Attendance: 23,283 (1,904 away); Referee: Tim Robinson

18 August 2021 3	West Bromwich Albion	4–0	Sheffield United	West Bromwich
20:00 BST	Robinson 26' (o.g.); O'Shea 47'; Mowatt 53'; Robinson 59'	Report	McGoldrick (yellow card) 30'	Stadium: The Hawthorns; Attendance: 23,113 (2,000 away); Referee: Matt Donohue
Note: Live on Sky Sports

21 August 2021 4	Blackburn Rovers	1–2	West Bromwich Albion	Blackburn
15:00 BST	Brereton 51'; Travis (yellow card) 58'	Report	Mowatt 1'; Livermore (yellow card) 18'; Phillips 45+4'; Furlong (yellow card) 81'	Stadium: Ewood Park; Attendance: 11,926 (2,359 away); Referee: Tony Harrington

28 August 2021 5	Peterborough United	0–1	West Bromwich Albion	Peterborough
20:00 BST	Norburn (yellow card) 8'; Thompson (yellow card) 71'	Report	Johnstone (yellow card) 64'; Mowatt (yellow card) 70'; Furlong (yellow card) 82'; Ajayi 90+4'; O'Shea (yellow card) 90+5'	Stadium: Weston Homes Stadium; Attendance: 10,163 (2,070 away); Referee: James Linington
Note: Live on Sky Sports

11 September 2021 6	West Bromwich Albion	1–1	Millwall	West Bromwich
15:00 BST	Kipré (yellow card) 20'; Grant (penalty missed) 45+4'; Bartley 49'	Report	Mitchell (yellow card) 43'; Ballard 55'; Wallace (yellow card) 60'; Smith (yellow card) 90+3'	Stadium: The Hawthorns; Attendance: 23,142 (1,262 away); Referee: Andy Woolmer

14 September 2021 7	West Bromwich Albion	0–0	Derby County	West Bromwich
20:00 BST	Livermore (yellow card) 45+2'	Report	Buchanan (yellow card) 33'	Stadium: The Hawthorns; Attendance: 21,636 (1,321 away); Referee: Kevin Friend

18 September 2021 8	Preston North End	1–1	West Bromwich Albion	Preston
15:00 BST	van den Berg (yellow card) 4'; Whiteman 26'	Report	Phillips 45+2'; Bartley (yellow card) 76'	Stadium: Deepdale; Attendance: 13,850 (3,219 away); Referee: Andy Davies

24 September 2021 9	West Bromwich Albion	2–1	Queens Park Rangers	West Bromwich
20:00 BST	Grant 75', 88'; Hugill (yellow card) 90+2'	Report	Gray 1'; Kakay (yellow card) 86'	Stadium: The Hawthorns; Attendance: 21,825 (1,237 away); Referee: James Linington

28 September 2021 10	Cardiff City	0–4	West Bromwich Albion	Leckwith
19:45 BST	Collins (yellow card) 39'	Report	Grant 5'; Bartley (yellow card) 42'; Nelson 56' (o.g.); Mowatt 75'; Phillips 82'	Stadium: Cardiff City Stadium; Attendance: 17,363 (1,144 away); Referee: Graham Scott

1 October 2021 11	Stoke City	1–0	West Bromwich Albion	Stoke-on-Trent, Staffordshire
19:45 BST	Davies (yellow card) 75'; Powell 75'; Surridge (yellow card) 90+6'	Report	Livermore (yellow card) 51'; Johnstone (yellow card) 90+6'	Stadium: Bet365 Stadium; Attendance: 22,703 (2,960 away); Referee: Tim Robinson

15 October 2021 12	West Bromwich Albion	1–0	Birmingham City	West Bromwich
20:00 BST	Clarke (yellow card) 72'; Grant 75', (yellow card) 89'	Report		Stadium: The Hawthorns; Attendance: 24,870 (2,000 away); Referee: Jeremy Simpson

20 October 2021 13	Swansea City	2–1	West Bromwich Albion	Landore
19:45 BST	Piroe 61'; Paterson 83', (yellow card) 83'; Bennett (yellow card) 90'	Report	Grant 1'; Ajayi (yellow card) 9'; Furlong (yellow card) 43'; Molumby (yellow card) 45'; Livermore (yellow card) 69'	Stadium: Swansea.com Stadium; Attendance: 16,694 (735 away); Referee: Simon Hooper

23 October 2021 14	West Bromwich Albion	3–0	Bristol City	West Bromwich
15:00 BST	Hugill 7'; Bartley 42'; Grant 52'	Report	Dasilva (yellow card) 45+2'; Simpson (yellow card) 67'	Stadium: The Hawthorns; Attendance: 23,845 (2,000 away); Referee: Josh Smith

30 October 2021 15	Fulham	3–0	West Bromwich Albion	Fulham
12:30 BST	Mitrović 20' (pen.), 40', 82'; Adarabioyo (red card) 85'	Report	Ajayi (yellow card) 23'; Bartley (yellow card) 52'; Furlong (red card) 70'; Snodgrass (yellow card) 76'	Stadium: Craven Cottage; Attendance: 18,103 (1,687 away); Referee: Michael Salisbury

2 November 2021 16	West Bromwich Albion	1–0	Hull City	West Bromwich
20:00 GMT	Grant 69'; Snodgrass (yellow card) 90+1'; Reach (yellow card) 90+5'	Report	Honeyman (yellow card) 37'; Docherty (yellow card) 61'	Stadium: The Hawthorns; Attendance: 19,589 (275 away); Referee: Dean Whitestone

6 November 2021 17	West Bromwich Albion	1–1	Middlesbrough	West Bromwich
15:00 GMT	Kipré (yellow card) 46'; Diangana (yellow card) 49', (goal) 65'; Snodgrass (yellow card) 90+2'	Report	McNair (yellow card) 24'; Peltier (yellow card) 30'; Coburn 38'; Jones (yellow card) 65'; Howson (yellow card) 89'	Stadium: The Hawthorns; Attendance: 22,596 (1,789 away); Referee: Matt Donohue

20 November 2021 18	Huddersfield Town	1–0	West Bromwich Albion	Huddersfield
15:00 GMT	Sinani 6'; Turton (yellow card) 49'	Report	Kipré (yellow card) 24'; Diangana (yellow card) 50'; Livermore (red card) 78'	Stadium: John Smith's Stadium; Attendance: 17,297 (2,331 away); Referee: Tim Robinson

23 November 2021 19	Blackpool	0–0	West Bromwich Albion	Blackpool
19:45 GMT	Wintle (yellow card) 51'; Anderson (yellow card) 57'	Report	Kipré (yellow card) 45'; Grant (yellow card) 88'	Stadium: Bloomfield Road; Attendance: 11,517 (1,976 away); Referee: Jarred Gillett

26 November 2021 20	West Bromwich Albion	0–0	Nottingham Forest	West Bromwich
20:00 GMT	Clarke (yellow card) 10'; Molumby (yellow card) 60' (yellow-red card) 70'	Report	Figueiredo (yellow card) 16'; Worrall (yellow card) 22'	Stadium: The Hawthorns; Attendance: 22,424 (2,000 away); Referee: Gavin Ward

4 December 2021 21	Coventry City	1–2	West Bromwich Albion	Coventry
12:30 GMT	McFadzean 83'	Report	Grant 20'; Mowatt (yellow card) 35'; McFadzean 43' (o.g.); Johnstone (yellow card) 66'; Kipré (yellow card) 74'	Stadium: Coventry Building Society Arena; Attendance: 23,755 (4,470 away); Referee: Keith Stroud

11 December 2021 22	West Bromwich Albion	1–0	Reading	West Bromwich
15:00 GMT	Robinson 62', (yellow card) 63'	Report	Halilović (yellow card) 34'; Tetek (yellow card) 66'	Stadium: The Hawthorns; Attendance: 21,306 (1,399 away); Referee: David Webb

17 December 2021 23	Barnsley	0–0	West Bromwich Albion	Barnsley
19:45 GMT	Helik (yellow card) 90+2'	Report	Livermore (yellow card) 52'; Townsend (yellow card) 70'; Molumby (yellow card) 90+5'	Stadium: Oakwell; Attendance: 12,086 (1,238 away); Referee: Tim Robinson

27 December 2021 24	Derby County	1–0	West Bromwich Albion	Derby
15:00 GMT	Davies (yellow card) 18'; Thompson (yellow card) 20'; Stearman (yellow card) 50'; Kazim-Richards 58'; Cashin (yellow card) 90+5'	Report	Clarke (yellow card) 36'	Stadium: Pride Park; Attendance: 24,846 (3,136 away); Referee: James Linington

2 January 2022 25	West Bromwich Albion	1–1	Cardiff City	West Bromwich
14:00 GMT	Bartley (yellow card) 23'; Robinson 48'; Mowatt (red card) 76'; Molumby (yellow card) 85'; Johnstone (red card) 90+5'	Report	Giles (yellow card) 27'; Collins 34'; McGuinness (yellow card) 90+4'; Flint (red card) 90+5'	Stadium: The Hawthorns; Attendance: 22,925 (1,987 away); Referee: Thomas Bramall

15 January 2022 26	Queens Park Rangers	1–0	West Bromwich Albion	Shepherd's Bush, London
15:00 GMT	Dickie (yellow card) 9'; Field (yellow card) 70'; Austin 89'	Report	Molumby (yellow card) 90+7'	Stadium: Kiyan Prince Foundation Stadium; Attendance: 16,018 (2,858 away); Referee: Simon Hooper

22 January 2022 27	West Bromwich Albion	3–0	Peterborough United	West Bromwich
15:00 GMT	Kipré 78'; Molumby (yellow card) 82'; Grant 85'; Diangana 89'	Report	Kent (yellow card) 90+4'	Stadium: The Hawthorns; Attendance: 21,251 (1,287 away); Referee: Jeremy Simpson

26 January 2022 28	West Bromwich Albion	0–2	Preston North End	West Bromwich
20:00 GMT	Furlong (yellow card) 49'; Townsend (yellow card) 78'	Report	Riis Jakobsen 41', (yellow card) 52'; Whiteman (yellow card) 48'; Evans (yellow card) 69'; Archer 76'; Maguire (yellow card) 90+5'	Stadium: The Hawthorns; Attendance: 20,776 (1,392 away); Referee: Keith Stroud

29 January 2022 29	Millwall	2–0	West Bromwich Albion	Bermondsey
15:00 GMT	Bennett 67', (yellow card) 70'; Afobe 76'	Report	Furlong (yellow card) 88'	Stadium: The Den; Attendance: 12,855 (1,708 away); Referee: Josh Smith

9 February 2022 30	Sheffield United	2–0	West Bromwich Albion	Sheffield
19:45 GMT	Sharp 22', 80'; Bogle (yellow card) 76'	Report	Mowatt (yellow card) 38'; Livermore (red card) 39'	Stadium: Bramall Lane; Attendance: 26,541 (1,619 away); Referee: Leigh Doughty

14 February 2022 31	West Bromwich Albion	0–0	Blackburn Rovers	West Bromwich
19:45 GMT		Report	Rankin-Costello (yellow card) 41'	Stadium: The Hawthorns; Attendance: 20,680 (1,503 away); Referee: John Brooks

19 February 2022 32	Luton Town	2–0	West Bromwich Albion	Luton
15:00 GMT	Bell (yellow card) 36'; Jerome 55'; Campbell 83', (yellow card) 86'	Report	Ajayi (yellow card) 29'; Molumby (yellow card) 84'; Bartley (yellow card) 84'	Stadium: Kenilworth Road; Attendance: 10,021 (1,032 away); Referee: Gavin Ward

22 February 2022 33	Middlesbrough	2–1	West Bromwich Albion	Middlesbrough
19:45 GMT	McNair 60'; Tavernier 69'; Jones (yellow card) 86'; Howson (yellow card) 90+2'	Report	Molumby 28', (yellow card) 31'; Reach (yellow card) 37'; Furlong (yellow card) 86'	Stadium: Riverside Stadium; Attendance: 21,646 (681 away); Referee: Michael Salisbury

28 February 2022 34	West Bromwich Albion	0–2	Swansea City	West Bromwich
20:00 GMT		Report	Downes (yellow card) 33'; Cabango (yellow card) 64'; Piroe 79'; Christie 84'	Stadium: The Hawthorns; Attendance: 20,209 (1,016 away); Referee: Dean Whitestone

5 March 2022 35	Hull City	0–2	West Bromwich Albion	Kingston upon Hull
15:00 GMT	Greaves (yellow card) 47'; McLoughlin (yellow card) 73'	Report	Grant 17', 48' (pen.); Clarke (yellow card) 27'; Robinson (yellow card) 82'	Stadium: MKM Stadium; Attendance: 13,643 (1,265 away); Referee: James Linington

11 March 2022 36	West Bromwich Albion	2–2	Huddersfield Town	West Bromwich
20:00 GMT	Townsend (yellow card) 25'; Gardner-Hickman (yellow card) 70'; Clarke (yellow card) 72'; Grant 84' (pen.); Carroll 85'	Report	Ward 24', 74'; Thomas (yellow card) 83'; Hogg (yellow card) 90+1'	Stadium: The Hawthorns; Attendance: 20,846 (1,165 away); Referee: Matt Donohue

15 March 2022 37	West Bromwich Albion	1–0	Fulham	West Bromwich
20:00 GMT	Robinson 75'; Molumby (yellow card) 88'	Report	Williams (yellow card) 70'	Stadium: The Hawthorns; Attendance: 20,079 (1,386 away); Referee: Kevin Friend

19 March 2022 38	Bristol City	2–2	West Bromwich Albion	Ashton Gate
15:00 GMT	Wells 29'; Weimann (yellow card) 76', (goal) 85'	Report	Livermore (yellow card) 36'; Grant 68' (pen.); Reach 90+3'	Stadium: Ashton Gate Stadium; Attendance: 20,586 (2,498 away); Referee: Leigh Doughty

3 April 2022 39	Birmingham City	1–0	West Bromwich Albion	Bordesley
15:00 BST	Taylor 67' (pen.), (yellow card) 75'; Bacuna (yellow card) 85'	Report	Robinson (yellow card) 75'	Stadium: St Andrew's Stadium; Attendance: 17,936 (1,874 away); Referee: Dean Whitestone

6 April 2022 40	West Bromwich Albion	2–0	Bournemouth	West Bromwich
20:00 BST	Mowatt 9'; Carroll 13'; Furlong (yellow card) 56'; Bartley (yellow card) 83'; Johnstone (yellow card) 84'	Report	Zemura (yellow card) 45+2'; Kelly (yellow card) 52'; Solanke (yellow card) 83'	Stadium: The Hawthorns; Attendance: 20,501 (1,263 away); Referee: Keith Stroud

9 April 2022 41	West Bromwich Albion	1–3	Stoke City	West Bromwich
15:00 BST	Robinson 73'	Report	Livermore 16' (o.g.); Brown 59'; Baker 90+4'	Stadium: The Hawthorns; Attendance: 22,761 (2,000 away); Referee: Andy Davies

15 April 2022 42	West Bromwich Albion	2–1	Blackpool	West Bromwich
15:00 BST	Carroll 42'; Grant 90+3'	Report	Ekpiteta 53'; Husband (yellow card) 71'	Stadium: The Hawthorns; Attendance: 21,717 (1,482 away); Referee: Jeremy Simpson

18 April 2022 43	Nottingham Forest	4–0	West Bromwich Albion	West Bridgford
20:00 BST	Johnson 19' (pen.); Spence (yellow card) 21'; Yates 23', (yellow card) 60'; Colback 45+2'; Surridge 90+3'	Report	Furlong (yellow card) 14' (yellow-red card) 17'; Gardner-Hickman (yellow card) 39'; Phillips (yellow card) 86'	Stadium: The City Ground; Attendance: 28,926 (1,740 away); Referee: David Webb

23 April 2022 44	West Bromwich Albion	0–0	Coventry City	West Bromwich
15:00 BST	O'Shea (yellow card) 36'; Grant (penalty missed) 90+6'	Report	McFadzean (yellow card) 71'	Stadium: The Hawthorns; Attendance: 22,160 (1,959 away); Referee: Steve Martin

30 April 2022 45	Reading	0–1	West Bromwich Albion	Reading
15:00 BST	Drinkwater (yellow card) 62'	Report	Phillips (yellow card) 32'; Molumby (yellow card) 55'; Grant 78'; Ashworth (yellow card) 90+3'	Stadium: Select Car Leasing Stadium; Attendance: 15,509 (2,014 away); Referee: Matt Donohue

7 May 2022 46	West Bromwich Albion	4–0	Barnsley	West Bromwich
12:30 BST	Grant 37' (pen.), 60', (penalty missed) 69'; Reach 40'; Clarke 52'	Report	Wolfe (yellow card) 88'	Stadium: The Hawthorns; Attendance: 21,515 (607 away); Referee: Leigh Doughty

=== FA Cup ===
West Brom were drawn at home to Brighton & Hove Albion in the third round.

8 January 2022 Third round	West Bromwich Albion	1–2 (a.e.t.)	Brighton & Hove Albion	West Bromwich
15:00 GMT	Livermore (yellow card) 40'; Robinson 47'; Kipré (yellow card) 67' (yellow-red card) 69'; Townsend (yellow card) 96'; Reach (yellow card) 102'	Report	Moder 81'; Maupay 98'	Stadium: The Hawthorns; Attendance: 8,208 (1,416 away); Referee: Robert Jones

=== EFL Cup ===
WBA entered the competition in the second round and were drawn at home to Arsenal.

25 August 2021 Second round	West Bromwich Albion	0–6	Arsenal	West Bromwich
20:00 BST	Castro (yellow card) 2'	Report	Aubameyang 17', 45', 62'; Holding (yellow card) 27'; Kolašinac (yellow card) 39'; Pépé 45+1'; Saka 50'; Lacazette 69'	Stadium: The Hawthorns; Attendance: 17,016 (2,600 away); Referee: David Webb
Note: Live on Sky Sports

== Transfers ==
=== Transfers in ===
Date	Position	Nationality	Name	From	Fee	Ref.
2 July 2021	CM	(England)	Alex Mowatt	(England) Barnsley	Free transfer	
13 July 2021	CM	(Portugal)	Quévin Castro	Unattached	Free transfer	
2 August 2021	LM	(England)	Adam Reach	(England) Sheffield Wednesday	Free transfer	
7 September 2021	CB	(England)	Kean Bryan	(England) Sheffield United	Free transfer	
1 January 2022	CF	(United States)	Daryl Dike	(United States) Orlando City	$9.5 million	
28 January 2022	CF	(England)	Andy Carroll	(England) Reading	Free transfer	
17 February 2022	CB	(England)	Cianole Nguepissi	(England) Birmingham City	Undisclosed	

=== Loans in ===
Date from	Position	Nationality	Name	From	Date until	Ref.
13 July 2021	CB	(England)	Matthew Clarke	(England) Brighton & Hove Albion	End of season	
25 August 2021	CF	(England)	Jordan Hugill	(England) Norwich City	29 January 2022 (Note: On 29 January, Hugill was recalled by Norwich.)	
27 August 2021	CM	(Republic of Ireland)	Jayson Molumby	(England) Brighton & Hove Albion	End of season	

=== Loans out ===
Date from	Position	Nationality	Name	To	Date until	Ref.
24 July 2021	GK	(England)	Josh Griffiths	(England) Lincoln City	End of season	
27 July 2021	CF	(England)	Callum Morton	(England) Fleetwood Town	8 January 2022 (Note: On 8 January, Callum Morton was recalled early from his loan at Fleetwood.)	
20 August 2021	CM	(Saint Kitts and Nevis)	Romaine Sawyers	(England) Stoke City	End of season	
31 August 2021	CF	(England)	Jovan Malcolm	(England) Accrington Stanley	End of season	
29 October 2021	LB	(Republic of Ireland)	Zak Delaney	(England) Bath City	January 2022	
29 October 2021	CB	(England)	Saul Shotton	(England) AFC Telford United	January 2022	
12 November 2021	CM	(England)	Toby King	(England) Billericay Town	January 2022	
19 November 2021	GK	(England)	Ted Cann	(England) AFC Telford United	19 December 2021	
24 December 2021	AM	(England)	Jamie Andrews	(England) Leamington	January 2022	
13 January 2022	CF	(England)	Callum Morton	(England) Peterborough United	End of season	
14 January 2022	CB	(Republic of Ireland)	Kevin Johnson	(England) Kettering Town	February 2022	
31 January 2022	CF	(England)	Jamie Soule	(England) Cheltenham Town	End of season	
31 January 2022	CF	(England)	Owen Windsor	(England) Carlisle United	End of season	
4 March 2022	GK	(England)	Alex Palmer	(England) Luton Town	11 March 2022	
5 March 2022	CF	(England)	Modou Faal	(England) Hereford	April 2022	

=== Transfers out ===
Date	Position	Nationality	Name	To	Fee	Ref.
25 June 2021	CM	(England)	Rekeem Harper	(England) Ipswich Town	Undisclosed	
1 July 2021	CF	(England)	Charlie Austin	(England) Queens Park Rangers	Released	
1 July 2021	GK	(Poland)	Maks Boruc	(Poland) Śląsk Wrocław	Free transfer	
1 July 2021	CM	(England)	Zak Brown	(England) Stourbridge FC	Released	
1 July 2021	LW	(England)	Nick Clayton-Phillips	(England) Kidderminster Harriers	Released	
1 July 2021	CF	(France)	Cheikh Diaby		Released	
1 July 2021	DF	(Republic of Ireland)	Vinnie Dwyer	(England) Sutton Coldfield Town	Released	
1 July 2021	LB	(England)	Tyrese Dyce	(England) Sunderland	Released	
1 July 2021	LM	(England)	Kyle Edwards	(England) Ipswich Town	Released	
1 July 2021	GK	(England)	Jamie Emery	(England) Kidderminster Harriers	Released	
1 July 2021	CM	(England)	Sam Field	(England) Queens Park Rangers	Free transfer	
1 July 2021	GK	(England)	Sam French		Released	
1 July 2021	LB	(England)	Kieran Gibbs	(United States) Inter Miami	Free transfer	
1 July 2021	CB	(England)	Ryan Grant	(England) Blackpool	Released	
1 July 2021	LW	(Poland)	Kamil Grosicki	(Poland) Pogoń Szczecin	Released	
1 July 2021	LB	(England)	George Harmon	(England) Oxford City	Released	
1 July 2021	CB	(Serbia)	Branislav Ivanović		Released	
1 July 2021	GK	(England)	Andy Lonergan	(England) Everton	Released	
1 July 2021	RB	(England)	Lee Peltier	(England) Middlesbrough	Released	
1 July 2021	CF	(Wales)	Hal Robson-Kanu		Released	
1 July 2021	CB	(England)	Thomas Sharpe	(England) Banbury United	Released	
1 July 2021	DM	(England)	Tom Solanke	(England) Stourbridge FC	Released	
1 July 2021	AM	(England)	Finley Thorndike	(England) Aston Villa	Released	
1 July 2021	RB	(England)	Aksum White	(England) Tamworth	Released	
1 July 2021	CB	(England)	Harry Williams	(England) Burnley	Released	
26 July 2021	CM	(England)	Finn Azaz	(England) Aston Villa	Free transfer	
29 July 2021	CM	(England)	Tim Iroegbunam	(England) Aston Villa	Undisclosed	
6 August 2021	RW	(Brazil)	Matheus Pereira	(Saudi Arabia) Al Hilal	Undisclosed	
28 January 2022	LB	(England)	Lino Sousa	(England) Arsenal	Undisclosed	
31 January 2022	RW	(Scotland)	Robert Snodgrass	(England) Luton Town	Mutual consent	

== Statistics ==
No.	Pos	Nat	Player	Total		Championship		FA Cup		League Cup	
No.	Pos	Nat	Player	Apps	Goals	Apps	Goals	Apps	Goals	Apps	Goals
1	GK	(England) ENG	Sam Johnstone	36	0	36	0	0	0	0	0
2	DF	(England) ENG	Darnell Furlong	42	0	41	0	1	0	0	0
3	DF	(England) ENG	Conor Townsend	44	0	43	0	1	0	0	0
4	DF	(Republic of Ireland) IRL	Dara O'Shea	14	2	14	2	0	0	0	0
5	DF	(England) ENG	Kyle Bartley	40	2	39	2	1	0	0	0
6	DF	(Nigeria) NGR	Semi Ajayi	31	1	31	1	0	0	0	0
7	FW	(Republic of Ireland) IRL	Callum Robinson	44	8	43	7	1	1	0	0
8	MF	(England) ENG	Jake Livermore	38	0	37	0	1	0	0	0
9	FW	(Denmark) DEN	Kenneth Zohore	3	0	2	0	0	0	1	0
10	MF	(Scotland) SCO	Matt Phillips	29	3	28	3	1	0	0	0
11	MF	(England) ENG	Grady Diangana	42	2	41	2	1	0	0	0
12	FW	(United States) USA	Daryl Dike	2	0	2	0	0	0	0	0
14	MF	(Republic of Ireland) IRL	Jayson Molumby	31	1	31	1	0	0	0	0
15	FW	(England) ENG	Andy Carroll	15	3	15	3	0	0	0	0
16	DF	(England) ENG	Matthew Clarke	33	1	33	1	0	0	0	0
17	FW	(England) ENG	Jordan Hugill	20	1	20	1	0	0	0	0
18	FW	(England) ENG	Karlan Grant	45	18	44	18	1	0	0	0
20	MF	(England) ENG	Adam Reach	36	2	34	2	1	0	1	0
21	DF	(Ivory Coast) CIV	Cédric Kipré	16	1	14	1	1	0	1	0
22	DF	(England) ENG	Kean Bryan	3	0	3	0	0	0	0	0
23	MF	(Scotland) SCO	Robert Snodgrass	7	0	6	0	0	0	1	0
25	GK	(England) ENG	David Button	11	0	10	0	1	0	0	0
27	MF	(England) ENG	Alex Mowatt	34	4	34	4	0	0	0	0
28	FW	(England) ENG	Rayhaan Tulloch	2	0	2	0	0	0	0	0
29	DF	(England) ENG	Taylor Gardner-Hickman	21	0	19	0	1	0	1	0
30	MF	(England) ENG	Rico Richards	1	0	0	0	0	0	1	0
31	DF	(England) ENG	Saul Shotton	1	0	0	0	0	0	1	0
32	MF	(Portugal) POR	Quévin Castro	3	0	2	0	0	0	1	0
33	DF	(England) ENG	Caleb Taylor	3	0	1	0	1	0	1	0
34	DF	(England) ENG	Ethan Ingram	1	0	0	0	0	0	1	0
35	DF	(England) ENG	Zac Ashworth	3	0	2	0	1	0	0	0
36	GK	(England) ENG	Alex Palmer	1	0	0	0	0	0	1	0
38	MF	(England) ENG	Toby King	1	0	0	0	0	0	1	0
40	FW	(The Gambia) GAM	Modou Faal	1	0	0	0	0	0	1	0
41	MF	(England) ENG	Tom Fellows	6	0	4	0	1	0	1	0
43	FW	(England) ENG	Reyes Cleary	1	0	0	0	1	0	0	0

=== Goals record ===
As of 30 January 2022

Rank	No.	Nat.	Po.	Name	Championship	FA Cup	League Cup	Total
1	18	(England)	CF	Karlan Grant	10	0	0	10
2	7	(Republic of Ireland)	RW	Callum Robinson	5	1	0	6
3	10	(Scotland)	LW	Matt Phillips	3	0	0	3
3	27	(England)	CM	Alex Mowatt	3	0	0	3
5	4	(Republic of Ireland)	CB	Dara O'Shea	2	0	0	2
5	5	(England)	CB	Kyle Bartley	2	0	0	2
5	11	(England)	RW	Grady Diangana	2	0	0	2
8	6	(Nigeria)	CB	Semi Ajayi	1	0	0	1
8	17	(England)	CF	Jordan Hugill	1	0	0	1
8	21	(Ivory Coast)	CB	Cédric Kipré	1	0	0	1
Own Goals					4	0	0	4
Total					34	1	0	35

=== Disciplinary record ===
As of 30 January 2022

Rank	No.	Nat.	Po.	Name	Championship			FA Cup			League Cup			Total		
Rank	No.	Nat.	Po.	Name	Yellow card	(yellow card) (yellow-red card)	Red card	Yellow card	(yellow card) (yellow-red card)	Red card	Yellow card	(yellow card) (yellow-red card)	Red card	Yellow card	(yellow card) (yellow-red card)	Red card
1	8	(England)	CM	Jake Livermore	6	0	1	1	0	0	0	0	0	6	0	1
2	14	(Republic of Ireland)	DM	Jayson Molumby	5	1	0	0	0	0	0	0	0	5	1	0
2	21	(Ivory Coast)	CB	Cédric Kipré	5	0	0	0	1	0	0	0	0	5	1	0
4	2	(England)	RB	Darnell Furlong	5	0	1	0	0	0	0	0	0	5	0	1
4	5	(England)	CB	Kyle Bartley	6	0	0	0	0	0	0	0	0	6	0	0
6	27	(England)	CM	Alex Mowatt	4	0	1	0	0	0	0	0	0	4	0	1
7	1	(England)	GK	Sam Johnstone	3	0	1	0	0	0	0	0	0	3	0	1
8	3	(England)	LB	Conor Townsend	2	0	0	1	0	0	0	0	0	3	0	0
8	16	(England)	CB	Matthew Clarke	3	0	0	0	0	0	0	0	0	3	0	0
8	23	(Scotland)	RW	Robert Snodgrass	3	0	0	0	0	0	0	0	0	3	0	0
11	6	(Nigeria)	CB	Semi Ajayi	2	0	0	0	0	0	0	0	0	2	0	0
11	11	(England)	RW	Grady Diangana	2	0	0	0	0	0	0	0	0	2	0	0
11	17	(England)	CF	Jordan Hugill	2	0	0	0	0	0	0	0	0	2	0	0
11	18	(England)	CF	Karlan Grant	2	0	0	0	0	0	0	0	0	2	0	0
11	20	(England)	LM	Adam Reach	1	0	0	1	0	0	0	0	0	2	0	0
16	4	(Republic of Ireland)	CB	Dara O'Shea	1	0	0	0	0	0	0	0	0	1	0	0
16	7	(Republic of Ireland)	RW	Callum Robinson	1	0	0	0	0	0	0	0	0	1	0	0
16	9	(Denmark)	CF	Kenneth Zohore	1	0	0	0	0	0	0	0	0	1	0	0
16	32	(Portugal)	CM	Quévin Castro	0	0	0	0	0	0	1	0	0	1	0	0
Total					53	1	4	3	1	0	1	0	0	57	2	4

== End of season awards ==
The winners of the 2021/22 end of season West Bromwich Albion awards were announced on 6 May 2022.

- Supporters’ Player of the Season - Matthew Clarke
- Players’ Player of the Season – Karlan Grant
- Top Goalscorer – Karlan Grant (18)
- Goal of the Season – Alex Mowatt v Cardiff (A)
- Young Player of the Season – Taylor Gardner-Hickman
