= Harry Birtwistle =

Singaporean footballer

Personal information
- Full name: Ryan James Harry Birtwistle
- Date of birth: 1 December 2003 (age 22)
- Place of birth: Singapore
- Position: Right wing-back

Team information
- Current team: Wacker Burghausen
- Number: 3

Youth career
- 2017–2025: Wolverhampton Wanderers

Senior career*
Years	Team	Apps	(Gls)
2021–2025	Wolverhampton Wanderers	0	(0)
2024	→ Oxford City (loan)	7	(0)
2025–	Wacker Burghausen	1	(1)
- * Club domestic league appearances and goals as of 12:45, 31 January 2025 (UTC)

Ryan James Harry Birtwistle (born 1 December 2003) is a Singaporean professional footballer who plays as a right wing-back for Regionalliga Bayern club Wacker Burghausen.

== Early life ==
Harry Birtwistle was born in Singapore on 1 December 2003 to an English father, John Birtwistle and a Singaporean Chinese mother, Rachel. He holds a Singapore passport.

== Club career ==
=== Wolverhampton Wanderers ===
Harry Birtwistle was first spotted and scouted by the Wolves academy staff when he was eight years old, as part of a Wolves international training camp in Singapore. Birtwistle then moved from Singapore to England in 2017 and he signed a scholarship with Wolverhampton Wanderers. He broke into the under-23 side at the age of 17 and eventually started training with the first team after impressing the coaching staff.

On 28 October 2021, it was announced that Birtwistle signed his first professional contract with the club which will run until the summer of 2024.

On 1 February 2024, Birtwistle joined Oxford City on loan until the end of the season.

On 30 January 2025, Birtwistle announced his departure from Wolverhampton Wanderers.

=== Wacker Burghausen ===
On 31 January 2025, Birtwistle joined Regionalliga Bayern club Wacker Burghausen.

== Personal life ==
Harry Birtwistle had applied to renounce his Singapore citizenship, but it was denied as Singapore's Ministry of Defence indicated he had yet to fulfil his National Service (NS) obligations. His family "stated that [he] would not be registering for NS". His father, John, would later release a statement that the changes on work permit requirements for non-British citizens following Brexit had made it essential for Harry to keep his British citizenship to pursue a football career in the Premier League, and Harry had not wanted to intentionally skip NS.

== Career statistics ==
As of matches played 9 July 2024

Club	Season	League			FA Cup		EFL Cup		Europe		Other		Total	
Club	Season	Division	Apps	Goals	Apps	Goals	Apps	Goals	Apps	Goals	Apps	Goals	Apps	Goals
Wolverhampton Wanderers U21	2021–22	—			—		—		—		3 (Note: Appearance(s) in the EFL Trophy)	0	3	0
Wolverhampton Wanderers U21	2022–23	—			—		—		—		3	0	3	0
Wolverhampton Wanderers U21	2023–24	—			—		—		—		3	0	3	0
Wolverhampton Wanderers U21	Total		—		—		—		—		9	0	9	0
Oxford City (loan)	2023–24	National League	7	0	—		—		—		—		7	0
Career total			7	0	0	0	0	0	0	0	9	0	16	0
