= Osazee Aghatise =

English footballer

Personal information
- Full name: Osazee Aghatise
- Date of birth: 12 November 2002 (age 24)
- Place of birth: Germany
- Position: Midfielder

Team information
- Current team: Carl Zeiss Jena
- Number: 4

Youth career
- 2010–2012: Manchester United
- 2012–2018: Manchester City
- 2018–2019: Stoke City
- 2019–2021: Derby County

Senior career*
Years	Team	Apps	(Gls)
2021–2023	Derby County	3	(0)
2023	Hartlepool United	5	(0)
2025–	Carl Zeiss Jena	5	(0)
- * Club domestic league appearances and goals as of 23 September 2026

Osazee Aghatise (born 12 November 2002) is a German professional footballer who plays as a midfielder for Regionalliga Nordost club Carl Zeiss Jena.

== Club career ==
Osazee began playing football with Manchester United's academy where he stayed for two years, before moving to Manchester City's academy. In 2018 he moved to Stoke City's youth side, and then to Derby County's U18s in 2019. He made his professional debut with Derby County on 6 November 2021, coming on as a late substitute in a 1–1 EFL Championship tie with Millwall. After making five first team appearances over three seasons, Aghatise was released by Derby County at the end of the 2022–23 season.

On 15 September 2023, Hartlepool United announced that they had signed Aghatise. He left the club on 13 October 2023 following the expiration of his short-term contract.

On 9 July 2025, Ashatise joined Regionalliga Nordost club Carl Zeiss Jena on a two-year deal following a successful trial period.

== Personal life ==
He moved to England at the age of seven where he spent the rest of his childhood.

== Career statistics ==
As of match played 30 September 2023

Appearances and goals by club, season and competition
Club	Season	League			FA Cup		League Cup		Other		Total	
Club	Season	Division	Apps	Goals	Apps	Goals	Apps	Goals	Apps	Goals	Apps	Goals
Derby County	2020–21	Championship	0	0	1	0	0	0	0	0	1	0
Derby County	2021–22	Championship	3	0	0	0	0	0	0	0	3	0
Derby County	2022–23	League One	0	0	0	0	0	0	1 (Note: Appearance in EFL Trophy)	0	1	0
Derby County	Total		3	0	1	0	0	0	1	0	5	0
Hartlepool United	2023–24	National League	5	0	0	0	0	0	0	0	5	0
Career total			8	0	1	0	0	0	1	0	10	0
