= Toby King (footballer, born 2002) =

English footballer

Personal information
- Full name: Toby James King
- Date of birth: 4 January 2002 (age 24)
- Place of birth: England
- Position: Midfielder

Team information
- Current team: Cray Wanderers

Youth career
- 2013–2018: West Ham United
- 2018–2021: West Bromwich Albion

Senior career*
Years	Team	Apps	(Gls)
2021–2022	West Bromwich Albion	0	(0)
2021	→ Billericay Town (loan)	3	(0)
2022	Vestri	10	(1)
2023	FC Baník Ostrava B		
2024	Vestri	11	(1)
2024–	Cray Wanderers	11	(0)
- * Club domestic league appearances and goals as of 11:09, 28 January 2025 (UTC)

Toby James King (born 4 January 2002) is an English footballer who plays as a midfielder for Cray Wanderers.

== Club career ==
A student of Felsted School and a youth product of West Ham United, King joined the youth academy of West Bromwich Albion in 2018. He signed his first professional contract with the club on 19 May 2020. He made his debut for the club on 25 August 2021, starting in a 6–0 EFL Cup second round defeat to Arsenal. In November 2021, he joined National League South side Billericay Town on loan.

In May 2022, King joined Icelandic 1. deild side Vestri on a permanent deal.

In September 2023, King joined Moravian-Silesian Football League club FC Baník Ostrava B.

In April 2024 he was back in Iceland with Vestri, appearing for them in the Besta deild karla with the club having won promotion the previous season. On 2 June, he scored his first goal in the Besta deild, in a 4-2 win against Stjarnan. In September 2024, King was playing for Isthmian League Premier Division side Cray Wanderers.

In the 2025-6 season, he scored four goals in four games for Arthurian League side the Old Felstedian Football Club, with his goal in the David Woolcott Trophy Final winning ‘champagne moment’.

== Career statistics ==
As of match played 25 August 2021

Appearances and goals by club, season and competition
Club	Season	League			FA Cup		EFL Cup		Other		Total	
Club	Season	Division	Apps	Goals	Apps	Goals	Apps	Goals	Apps	Goals	Apps	Goals
West Bromwich Albion	2021–22	EFL Championship	0	0	0	0	1	0	0	0	1	0
Career total			0	0	0	0	1	0	0	0	1	0
