= Pat Jarrett =

Australian journalist (1911–1990)

Pat Jarrett MBE
- Born: Irene Herschell Jarrett; 9 March 1911; Albert Park, Victoria, Australia
- Died: 28 August 1990 (aged 79); Frankston, Victoria, Australia
- Occupations: Sports journalist and press officer

Patricia Irene (Pat) Jarrett MBE (9 March 1911 – 28 August 1990) was an Australian sports journalist, press officer and sub-editor.

== Life ==
Jarrett was born in 1911 in the Melbourne suburb of Albert Park. She was registered as Irene Herschell Jarrett, but she was always known as Patricia. Her parents were Jessie Mabel (born Herschell) and her husband Cyril Chalmers Jarrett. Her father managed a station and her mother's brother owned Herschell's Film Laboratories. She was a keen sportswoman competing in both swimming and athletic events, which she was still doing when she started sending in her writing to The Sporting Globe.

She took up writing about sport for a living after she joined The Herald in 1933. She wrote about Betty Archdale and the English women cricketer's tour of Australia and then the Australian women's cricket team in England in 1937.

During a journey in 1939 to North America, she re-met Maie Casey (later Lady Casey), en route to join her husband, who was leading the new Australian legation in Washington and Jarrett and Casey became friends. Casey later employed Jarrett as her secretary and Casey gained a reputation as a leading hostess in Washington. In 1941, Jarrett became Casey's husband's press liaison officer. She would organise photo opportunities for them and they became known as the "flying Caseys". She cast the Caseys as a power couple and, with the assistance of photos taken by Cecil Beaton, she created a good impression of them in both the Australian and the British press.

In 1947, Jarrett reluctantly took the role of the women's editor on The Sun News-Pictorial in Melbourne. She began a column titled "Fair Comment", which became well known. She retired from The Sun News-Pictorial in 1973, but she remained a consultant to the paper until 1985. She was appointed a Member of the Order of the British Empire (MBE) in the 1972 Queen's Birthday Honours for service to journalism.

Jarrett died in 1990 in Frankston, Victoria, at the age of 79. Her biography Fair Comment was published in 1996.
