= 2023–24 Premier League Cup =

Tournament details
- Country: England; Wales
- Teams: 32

Final positions
- Champions: Fulham (1st Title)
- Runners-up: Tottenham Hotspur (1st Runner Up Finish)

Tournament statistics
- Matches played: 110
- Goals scored: 424 (3.85 per match)
- Attendance: 30,455 (277 per match)
- Top goal scorer: (France) Ateef Konaté Nottingham Forest (8 Goals)

The 2023–24 Premier League Cup was the tenth edition of the competition.

The defending champions were Brentford who defeated Blackburn Rovers 2–1 in last year's final.

32 academies competed in this edition of the competition. Eight teams did not return; Arsenal after 2 consecutive seasons, Cardiff City after last year, Derby County after 9 seasons, Everton after 9 seasons, Queens Park Rangers, Southampton 9 seasons, Stoke City 9 seasons, and Watford after 3 consecutive seasons did not take part in this year's competition.

Three teams competed as for the very first time; Fleetwood Town who competed in the competition proper for the first time, alongside Luton Town, and Tottenham Hotspur. Chelsea returned to the competition for the first time since 2015–16, Ipswich Town for the first time since 2017–18, Leicester City for the first time since 2018–19 and Leeds United and Norwich City both return after missing last year's edition of the competition.

== Participants ==
=== Category 1 ===
- Aston Villa
- Blackburn Rovers
- Brighton & Hove Albion
- Chelsea
- Crystal Palace
- Fulham
- Leeds United
- Leicester City
- Middlesbrough
- Newcastle United
- Norwich City
- Nottingham Forest
- Reading
- Sunderland
- Tottenham Hotspur
- West Bromwich Albion
- Wolverhampton Wanderers

=== Category 2 ===
- AFC Bournemouth
- Birmingham City
- Bristol City
- Charlton Athletic
- Burnley
- Colchester United
- Fleetwood Town
- Hull City
- Ipswich Town
- Peterborough United
- Sheffield United
- Swansea City

=== Category 3 ===
- Luton Town

=== Category 4 ===
- Brentford
- Huddersfield Town

== Group stage ==
The draw for the Group Stage took place on 9 August 2023. Teams play each other twice, with the group winners and runners–up advance to the round of 16.

=== Group A ===
Team	Pld	W	D	L	GF	GA	GD	Pts
Aston Villa	6	4	2	0	15	8	+7	14
Swansea City	6	3	1	2	17	8	+9	10
Brighton & Hove Albion	6	3	1	2	13	10	+3	10
Hull City	6	0	0	6	4	23	−19	0

Updated to match(es) played on 12 November 2023. Source:

15 September 2023	Brighton & Hove Albion	2–2	Aston Villa	Lancing
13:00	Baker-Boaitey 63'; Ifill 90+5'	Report	Smith 47'; Ealing 56'	Stadium: American Express Elite Performance Centre; Attendance: 106; Referee: Matthew Russell

29 September 2023	Swansea City	4–0	Hull City	Landore
19:00	Fletcher 47' (pen.), 73'; Davies 50'; Smith 90+1'	Report		Stadium: Landore Training Centre; Attendance: 250; Referee: Ruebyn Ricardo

6 October 2023	Aston Villa	1–0	Hull City	Bodymoor Heath
19:00	Rowe 45+1'	Report		Stadium: Bodymoor Heath Training Ground; Attendance: 323; Referee: Michael Barlow

7 October 2023	Swansea City	3–1	Brighton & Hove Albion	Landore
14:00	Fletcher 27', 84'; Kavanagh 78' (o.g.)	Report	O’Mahony 57'	Stadium: Landore Training Centre; Attendance: 100; Referee: David Mcnamara

12 November 2023	Hull City	0–5	Brighton & Hove Albion	North Ferriby
8:00		Report	Duffus 22', 43'; Barrington 34'; Chouchane 37'; Mullins 49'	Stadium: Dransfield Stadium; Attendance: 137; Referee: Simon Robinson

13 November 2023	Swansea City	3–4	Aston Villa	Landore
13:00	Fletcher 21'; Parker 52'; Wilson 75'	Report	Rowe 25'; Richards 77'; Moore 87', 90+8'	Stadium: Landore Training Centre; Attendance: 220; Referee: Greg Rollason

8 December 2023	Aston Villa	4–0	Brighton & Hove Albion	Bodymoor Heath
19:15	Broggio 5'; Moore 9'; Richards 43'; O'Reilly 56'	Report		Stadium: Bodymoor Heath Training Ground; Attendance: 239; Referee: Benjamin Wyatt

8 December 2023	Hull City	1–6	Swansea City	Hull
13:00	Simms 61'	Report	Smith 3', 13'; Fanning 33' (o.g.); Tjoe-A-On 57'; Fletcher 58'; Davies 82'	Stadium: MKM Stadium; Attendance: 95; Referee: James Westgate

23 January 2024	Hull City	2–3	Aston Villa	North Ferriby
13:00	Trialist 44'; Hall 52'	Report	Pierre 20'; Alcock 57'; Borland 74'	Stadium: Dronsfield Stadium; Attendance: 120; Referee: James Oldham

23 January 2024	Brighton & Hove Albion	1–0	Swansea City	Lancing
13:30	O'Mahony 90+5'	Report		Stadium: American Express Elite Performance Centre; Attendance: 106; Referee: Wayne Cartmel
Note: match was moved ahead one day.

2 February 2024	Aston Villa	1–1	Swansea City	Bodymoor Heath
13:00	Moore 31' (pen.)	Report	Congreve 25'	Stadium: Bodymoor Heath Training Ground; Attendance: 332; Referee: Aaron Jackson

5 February 2024	Brighton & Hove Albion	4–1	Hull City	Lancing
13:30	Chouchane 64' (pen.); O'Mahony 78', 89'; Flower 90+2'	Report	Sellars-Fleming 10' (pen.)	Stadium: American Express Elite Performance Centre; Attendance: 101; Referee: Jason Richardson

=== Group B ===
Team	Pld	W	D	L	GF	GA	GD	Pts
Sheffield United	6	3	1	2	15	12	+3	10
Blackburn Rovers	6	3	1	2	11	10	+1	10
West Bromwich Albion	6	3	1	2	9	11	−2	10
Reading	6	1	1	4	11	13	−2	4

Updated to match(es) played on 10 January 2024. Source:

4 September 2023	West Bromwich Albion	2–1	Sheffield United	Hednesford
13:00	Fellows 32'; Heard 42'	Report	Hackford 57'	Stadium: Keys Park; Attendance: 120; Referee: John Mulligan

11 September 2023	Reading	1–2	Blackburn Rovers	Reading
13:00	Clarke 80'	Report	Biniek 62'; Stritch 86'	Stadium: Select Car Leasing Stadium; Attendance: 227; Referee: Greg Rollason

7 October 2023	Blackburn Rovers	0–0	West Bromwich Albion	Leyland
13:00		Report		Stadium: County Ground; Attendance: 94; Referee: Steven Copeland

9 October 2023	Sheffield United	2–2	Reading	Chesterfield
19:00	Brewster 18'; Hackford 24'	Report	Stickland 45+8'; Akande 71'	Stadium: SMH Group Stadium; Attendance: 144; Referee: Dean Watson

11 November 2023	Blackburn Rovers	2–3	Sheffield United	Leyland
6:00	Leonard 13' (pen.); Batty 25'	Report	Peck 4'; Macedo 41'; Hampson 90+4'	Stadium: County Ground; Attendance: 94; Referee: Steven Copeland

13 November 2023	Reading	2–3	West Bromwich Albion	Aldershot
13:00	Spencer 51'; Stickland 75'	Report	Cleary 41', 78' (pen.); Sule 57'	Stadium: The EBB Stadium; Attendance: 163; Referee: Matthew Russell

11 December 2023	Sheffield United	5–2	West Bromwich Albion	Chesterfield
13:00	Hackford 51', 81', 90+2'; Hall 68' (o.g.); Hampson 87'	Report	Heard 62', 76' (pen.)	Stadium: SMH Group Stadium; Attendance: 152; Referee: David Richardson

10 January 2024	Blackburn Rovers	4–2	Reading	Leyland
13:00	Batty 65', 78'; Markdanday 70'; Ennis 82' (pen.)	Report	Akande 5'; Wellens 27'	Stadium: County Ground; Attendance: 149; Referee: David Richardson
Note: Match was originally going to be played on 9 December 2023, but was postponed due to a waterlogged pitch.

22 January 2024	West Bromwich Albion	2–0	Blackburn Rovers	Hednesford
13:00	Deeming 54'; Hall 72'	Report		Stadium: Keys Park; Attendance: 149; Referee: Benjamin Wyatt

31 January 2024	Reading	1–2	Sheffield United	Aldershot
13:00	Smith 25'	Report	Oné 29'; Pitan 69'	Stadium: The EBB Stadium; Attendance: 81; Referee: Sam Mulhall
Note: Match was originally going to be played 19 January 2024, but was postponed due to a frozen pitch.

5 February 2024	Sheffield United	2–3	Blackburn Rovers	Chesterfield
13:00	Macedo 28'; Hampson 43'	Report	Nsangou 21'; Gilsenan 26', 45+2'	Stadium: SMH Group Stadium; Attendance: 152; Referee: Aaron Jackson

5 February 2024	West Bromwich Albion	0–3	Reading	Hednesford
		Report	Wareham 66'; Clarke 78'; Stickland 90+1'	Stadium: Keys Park; Attendance: 113; Referee: Elliot Bell

=== Group C ===
Team	Pld	W	D	L	GF	GA	GD	Pts
AFC Bournemouth	6	5	1	0	17	3	+14	16
Norwich City	6	3	1	2	14	8	+6	10
Wolverhampton Wanderers	6	1	2	3	5	10	−5	5
Charlton Athletic	6	1	0	5	4	19	−15	3

Updated to match(es) played on 22 January 2024. Source:

19 September 2023	Charlton Athletic	0–4	AFC Bournemouth	Dartford
19:00		Report	Adu-Adjei 8', 62'; Landa 28', 56'	Stadium: Princes Park; Attendance: 140; Referee: James Durkin

19 September 2023	Norwich City	2–2	Wolverhampton Wanderers	Norwich
19:00	Aboh 16'; Brooke 53'	Report	McLeod 8'; Chiwome 88'	Stadium: Lotus Training Centre; Attendance: 188; Referee: Farai Hallam

6 October 2023	Wolverhampton Wanderers	0–0	AFC Bournemouth	Wellington
19:00		Report		Stadium: New Bucks Head; Attendance: 164; Referee: Dale Baines

9 October 2023	Charlton Athletic	0–5	Norwich City	Dartford
19:00		Report	Manning 34'; Aboh 59'; Fisher 62'; Pedro Lima 77'; Duffy 90+3'	Stadium: Princes Park; Attendance: 140; Referee: Richie Watkins

10 November 2023	Norwich City	2–3	AFC Bournemouth	Norwich
13:00	Duffy 62', 65'	Report	Sadi 4'; Moriah-Welsh 12'; Adu-Adjei 73'	Stadium: Lotus Training Centre; Attendance: 180; Referee: Ruebyn Ricardo

12 November 2023	Wolverhampton Wanderers	0–2	Charlton Athletic	Kidderminster
9:00		Report	Bower 35'; Casey 51'	Stadium: Aggborough; Attendance: 95; Referee: John Mulligan

11 December 2023	Wolverhampton Wanderers	0–1	Norwich City	Kidderminster
13:00		Report	Duffy 20'	Stadium: Aggborough; Attendance: 135; Referee: Richie Watkins

19 January 2024	Norwich City	4–2	Charlton Athletic	Norwich
13:00	Aboh 63', 71'; Mundle-Smith 82'; Myles 84'	Report	Ladapo 11'; Bower 30'	Stadium: Lotus Training Centre; Attendance: 114; Referee: Aji Ajibola

22 January 2024	AFC Bournemouth	5–1	Wolverhampton Wanderers	Eastleigh
13:00	Moriah-Welsh 41'; Adu-Adjei 45+2'; Sadi 51', 56'; Clarke 76'	Report	Kandola 90+1'	Stadium: Silverlake Stadium; Attendance: 74; Referee: Aaron Farmer

27 January 2024	AFC Bournemouth	4–0	Charlton Athletic	Wimborne
7:00	Adu-Adjei 3', 73'; Landa 12'; Sadi 15'	Report		Stadium: Canford Park Arena; Attendance: 240; Referee: Gary Parsons
Note: Match was originally going to be played on 10 December 2023, but was postponed due to a waterlogged pitch.

3 February 2024	AFC Bournemouth	1–0	Norwich City	Wimborne
6:00	Landa 56'	Report		Stadium: Canford Park Arena; Attendance: 300; Referee: Stephen Parkinson
Note: Match was originally going to be played 5 February 2024 but was moved two days back to February 3.

5 February 2024	Charlton Athletic	0–2	Wolverhampton Wanderers	Dartford
13:00		Report	Lopes 69'; Edozie 78'	Stadium: Princes Park; Attendance: 127; Referee: Abigail Byrne

=== Group D ===
Team	Pld	W	D	L	GF	GA	GD	Pts
Chelsea	6	5	1	0	20	9	+11	16
Leeds United	6	4	1	1	15	9	+6	13
Colchester United	6	2	0	4	10	14	−4	6
Luton Town	6	0	0	6	3	16	−13	0

Updated to match(es) played on 22 January 2024. Source:

15 September 2023	Leeds United	3–2	Colchester United	York
13:00	Gyabi 4'; Bate 9'; McGurk 68'	Report	Bennett 3'; Cooper 14'	Stadium: LNER Community Stadium; Attendance: 238; Referee: Richard Aspinall

19 September 2023	Chelsea	4–1	Luton Town	Kingston upon Thames
19:00	Castledine 30', 89'; Williams 36'; George 90+5'	Report	Daws 45+5'	Stadium: Kingsmeadow; Attendance: 502; Referee: Constantine Hatzidakis

6 October 2023	Colchester United	2–5	Chelsea	Maldon, Essex
19:00	Thorn 65'; Nelson 90+1'	Report	Nelson 15' (o.g.); George 42', 77'; Morgan 58'; McNeilly 90+5'	Stadium: Wallace Binder Stadium; Attendance: 311; Referee: Matthew Fletcher

6 October 2023	Leeds United	4–1	Luton Town	York
19:00	Allen 3'; Thomas 22'; McGurk 31'; Bate 83'	Report	Burger 8'	Stadium: LNER Community Stadium; Attendance: 317; Referee: Gareth Rhodes

8 November 2023	Colchester United	2–0	Luton Town	Maldon, Essex
13:00	Nelson 8'; Oliver 53'	Report		Stadium: Wallace Binder Stadium; Attendance: 45; Referee: Richie Watkins

12 November 2023	Leeds United	1–2	Chelsea	York
7:00	McGurk 75'	Report	Washington 9', 26'	Stadium: LNER Community Stadium; Attendance: 452; Referee: James Westgate

11 December 2023	Colchester United	1–2	Leeds United	Maldon, Essex
13:00	Ihionvien 45'	Report	Monteiro 79'; Snowdon 90+6'	Stadium: Wallace Binder Stadium; Attendance: 249; Referee: Jason Richardson

12 December 2023	Luton Town	1–2	Chelsea	Luton
13:00	Matthews-Lewis 82'	Report 1 Report 2	Silcott-Duberry 57'; George 74'	Stadium: Kenilworth Road; Attendance: 908; Referee: Andrew Miller

22 January 2024	Chelsea	4–1	Colchester United	Kingston upon Thames
13:00	Runham 4'; Golding 14'; Silcott-Duberry 17'; Edwards 83' (o.g.)	Report	Ihionvien 89'	Stadium: Kingsmeadow; Attendance: 389; Referee: Gary Parsons
Note: Match was originally going to be played on 19 January 2024 but was moved due to Chelsea's FA Youth Cup matchup against Everton on 19 January 2024.

2 February 2024	Chelsea	3–3	Leeds United	Kingston upon Thames
13:00	Silcott-Duberry 14'; Morgan 45+5', 60'	Report	Allen 23'; Wilson 54'; Thomas 79'	Stadium: Kingsmeadow; Attendance: 225; Referee: Aaron Farmer

2 February 2024	Luton Town	0–2	Colchester United	Luton
13:00		Report	Cooper 28'; Sandah 45+2'	Stadium: Kenilworth Road; Attendance: 567; Referee: Andrew Humphries

12 February 2024	Luton Town	0–2	Leeds United	St Albans
13:00		Report	Perkins 36'; Allen 37'	Stadium: Clarence Park; Attendance: 470; Referee: Lauren Impey
Note: Match was originally going to be played 19 January 2024 at Kenilworth Road in Luton, but was postponed due to a frozen pitch and moved to Clarence Park in St Albans.

=== Group E ===
Team	Pld	W	D	L	GF	GA	GD	Pts
Tottenham Hotspur	6	5	0	1	10	7	+3	15
Sunderland	5	3	0	2	7	6	+1	9
Bristol City	6	2	0	4	9	9	0	6
Peterborough United	5	1	0	4	8	12	−4	3

Updated to match(es) played on 12 November 2023. Source:

18 August 2023	Bristol City	4–3	Peterborough United	Failand
13:00	Araoye 38'; Francois 45'; Churchley 51'; Idehen 90+5'	Report	Corbett 14'; Overton 20'; Titchmarsh 68'	Stadium: Robins High Performance Centre; Attendance: 98; Referee: Andrew Humphries

29 August 2023	Tottenham Hotspur	3–2	Sunderland	Stevenage
13:00	Donley 21' (pen.); Santiago 37'; White 90+8'	Report 1 Report 2	Taylor 30'; Crompton 86'	Stadium: Lamex Stadium; Attendance: 317; Referee: Gary Parsons

9 October 2023	Bristol City	1–2	Tottenham Hotspur	Failand
19:00	Yeboah 13'	Report	McKnight 29'; Soonsup-Bell 90+5'	Stadium: Robins High Performance Centre; Attendance: 580; Referee: Andrew Humphries

9 October 2023	Sunderland	2–1	Peterborough United	Hetton-le-Hole
19:00	Taylor 58'; Fieldson 90+7'	Report	Corbett 77' (pen.)	Stadium: Eppleton Colliery Welfare Ground; Attendance: 503; Referee: Jamie O'Connor

12 November 2023	Peterborough United	0–2	Tottenham Hotspur	Stamford
7:00		Report	Lankshear 24'; Kyerematen 33'	Stadium: Zeeco Stadium; Attendance: 150; Referee: Richard Aspinall

13 November 2023	Bristol City	0–1	Sunderland	Failand
13:00		Report	Taylor 66' (pen.)	Stadium: Robins High Performance Centre; Attendance: 150; Referee: Andrew Humphries

11 December 2023	Sunderland	1–2	Tottenham Hotspur	Hetton-le-Hole
13:00	Gardiner 90+5'	Report	Soonsup-Bell 5'; Kyerematen 6'	Stadium: Eppleton Colliery Welfare Ground; Attendance: 309; Referee: Dean Watson

27 January 2024	Peterborough United	1–4	Bristol City	Market Deeping
7:00	Aderoju 17'	Report	Hutton 4'; Churchley 9', 24'; Blackwell 53' (pen.)	Stadium: Deeping Sports Club; Attendance: 53; Referee: Wayne Cartmel
Note: Match was going to be originally played on 11 December 2023, but was postponed due to a waterlogged pitch.

30 January 2024	Tottenham Hotspur	1–0	Bristol City	St. Albans
13:00	Lankshear 89'	Report		Stadium: Clarence Park; Attendance: 690; Referee: Andrew Humphries
Note: Match was going to be originally played on 6 January 2024, but was postponed due to a waterlogged pitch.

3 February 2024	Tottenham Hotspur	0–3	Peterborough United	St. Albans
7:00		Report	Aderoju 28', 37'; Fernandez 86'	Stadium: Clarence Park; Attendance: 640; Referee: Callum Walchester
Note: match was originally going to be played 1 February 2024 but was moved two days later.

5 February 2024	Sunderland	1–0	Bristol City	Hetton-le-Hole
13:00	Semedo 78'	Report		Stadium: Eppleton Colliery Welfare Ground; Attendance: 394; Referee: David Richardson

10 May 2024	Peterborough United	0–0	Sunderland	Market Deeping
13:00		Report		Stadium: Deeping Sports Club
Note: Match was originally scheduled for 21 January 2024, but was postponed due to a frozen pitch. Match was never played.

=== Group F ===
Team	Pld	W	D	L	GF	GA	GD	Pts
Nottingham Forest	6	4	1	1	18	5	+13	13
Fleetwood Town	6	2	2	2	12	10	+2	8
Newcastle United	6	1	3	2	6	9	−3	6
Huddersfield Town	6	1	2	3	5	17	−12	5

Updated to match(es) played on 21 December 2023. Source:

13 September 2023	Huddersfield Town	1–1	Newcastle United	Huddersfield
19:00	Hudlin 72'	Report	Donaldson 67'	Stadium: John Smith's Stadium; Attendance: 239; Referee: James Westgate

15 September 2023	Fleetwood Town	1–3	Nottingham Forest	Chorley
13:00	Kayden 90+4'	Report	Konaté 27', 32'; Norkett 38' (pen.)	Stadium: Victory Park; Attendance: 120; Referee: Simon Robinson

6 October 2023	Nottingham Forest	1–1	Huddersfield Town	Alfreton
13:00	Gardner 50'	Report	Ondo 83'	Stadium: Impact Arena; Attendance: 202; Referee: Dean Watson

7 October 2023	Newcastle United	2–2	Fleetwood Town	Newcastle-upon-Tyne
14:00	Crossley 49'; Parkinson 64'	Report	Williams 86'; Teale 90+3'	Stadium: Northumberland FA HQ; Attendance: 265; Referee: Aaron Bannister

10 November 2023	Huddersfield Town	0–3	Fleetwood Town	Huddersfield
13:00		Report	Glenfield 8'; Fishburn 31', 76'	Stadium: John Smith's Stadium; Attendance: 173; Referee: John Mulligan

11 November 2023	Newcastle United	0–3	Nottingham Forest	Newcastle-upon-Tyne
7:00		Report	Konaté 11', 82'; Gardner 45'	Stadium: Northumberland FA HQ; Attendance: 69; Referee: Gareth Rhodes

24 November 2023	Newcastle United	0–1	Huddersfield Town	Newcastle-upon-Tyne
13:00		Report	Falls 86'	Stadium: Northumberland FA HQ; Attendance: 126; Referee: Benjamin Wyatt

21 December 2023	Nottingham Forest	2–1	Fleetwood Town	Alfreton
13:00	Donaghy 61' (o.g.); Norkett 69' (pen.)	Report	Glenfield 21'	Stadium: Impact Arena; Attendance: 55; Referee: Alan Dale
Note: Match was originally going to be played on 8 December 2023, but was postponed due to a waterlogged pitch.

19 January 2024	Huddersfield Town	0–8	Nottingham Forest	Huddersfield
13:00		Report	Konaté 34'; McAdam 38', 82'; Newton 73'; Norkett 77', 87'; Whitehall 89'; Brown 90+1'	Stadium: John Smith's Stadium; Attendance: 167; Referee: Michael Crusham

2 February 2024	Fleetwood Town	1–1	Newcastle United	Clitheroe
13:00	Pond 57'	Report	Diallo 41' (pen.)	Stadium: EcoGiants Stadium; Attendance: 100; Referee: Jamie O'Connor
Note: Match was originally going to be played 19 January 2024 at Victory Park in Chorley, but was moved to 2 February 2024 at EcoGiants Stadium in Clitheroe.

5 February 2024	Nottingham Forest	1–2	Newcastle United	Alfreton
13:00	Norkett 11'	Report	Murphy 50'; Diallo 53' (pen.)	Stadium: Impact Arena; Attendance: 123; Referee: Benjamin Wyatt

6 February 2024	Fleetwood Town	4–2	Huddersfield Town	Clitheroe
7:00	Fishburn 24'; Asamoah 53', 72'; Williams 90+5'	Report	Philpott 62' (pen.); Isaac 76'	Stadium: EcoGiants Stadium; Attendance: 80; Referee: Michael Barlow
Note: match was originally going to be played 2 February 2024, but was moved back one day.

=== Group G ===
Team	Pld	W	D	L	GF	GA	GD	Pts
Fulham	6	3	2	1	20	4	+16	11
Leicester City	6	3	0	3	9	12	−3	9
Brentford	6	1	3	2	10	15	−5	6
Burnley	6	1	3	2	11	19	−8	6

Updated to match(es) played on 22 January 2024. Source:

15 September 2023	Brentford	1–6	Fulham	Woking
13:00	Olakigbe 51' (pen.)	Report	Okkas 27', 68'; McFarlane 37'; Works 88'; De Jesus 90+7'; O'Neill 90+11'	Stadium: The Laithwaite Community Stadium; Attendance: 349; Referee: Sam Mulhall

15 September 2023	Leicester City	3–4	Burnley	Seagrave
13:00	Marçal 31'; Richards 56'; Thomas 90+4'	Report	Westley 45'; Rieno 61'; Richardson 64'; Westley 80'	Stadium: Leicester City Training Ground; Attendance: 253; Referee: Dale Baines

6 October 2023	Fulham	4–0	Leicester City	New Malden
19:00	Lanquedoc 10', 57'; King 15'; Harris 48'	Report		Stadium: Motspur Park; Attendance: 140; Referee: Matthew Russell

7 October 2023	Burnley	3–3	Brentford	Chorley
12:30	Richardson 43'; Hugill 45+2', 73'	Report	Young-Coombes 13', 40'; Hay 61'	Stadium: Victory Park; Attendance: 142; Referee: David Richardson

10 November 2023	Brentford	1–0	Leicester City	Staines
13:00	Adedokun 18'	Report		Stadium: Wheatsheaf Park; Attendance: 869; Referee: Callum Walchester

10 November 2023	Fulham	8–0	Burnley	New Malden
13:00	Loupalo-Bi 2'; Harris 32', 54'; D'Auria-Henry 37'; Donnell 69', 73', 78'; Okkas 85'	Report		Stadium: Motspur Park; Attendance: 118; Referee: Abigail Byrne

8 December 2023	Fulham	1–1	Brentford	New Malden
13:00	Okkas 56'	Report	Morgan 8'	Stadium: Motspur Park; Attendance: 138; Referee: Gary Parsons

11 December 2023	Burnley	1–2	Leicester City	Leyland
13:00	Richardson 56'	Report	Thomas 69'; Briggs 73'	Stadium: County Ground; Attendance: 184; Referee: Paul Marsden

20 January 2024	Brentford	2–2	Burnley	Staines
6:30	Morgan 24'; Hay 61'	Report	O'Neill 35'; Richardson 75'	Stadium: Wheatsheaf Park; Attendance: 580; Referee: David Mcnamara

22 January 2024	Leicester City	1–0	Fulham	Seagrave
13:00	Briggs 90+1'	Report		Stadium: Leicester City Training Ground; Attendance: 203; Referee: Jamie O'Connor

2 February 2024	Leicester City	3–2	Brentford	Seagrave
13:00	Marçal 18'; Thomas 45+4'; Ewing 74'	Report	Morgan 48' (pen.); Lisbie 86'	Stadium: Leicester City Training Ground; Attendance: 348; Referee: Alan Dale

5 February 2024	Burnley	1–1	Fulham	Leyland
13:00	McDermott 35'	Report	Avenall 39'	Stadium: County Ground; Attendance: 146; Referee: Zac Kennard-Kettle

=== Group H ===
Team	Pld	W	D	L	GF	GA	GD	Pts
Crystal Palace	6	4	0	2	16	11	+5	12
Middlesbrough	6	3	0	3	12	10	+2	9
Ipswich Town	6	2	1	3	8	9	−1	7
Birmingham City	6	2	1	3	7	13	−6	7

Updated to match(es) played on 22 January 2024. Source:

15 September 2023	Middlesbrough	2–6	Crystal Palace	Bishop Auckland
19:00	Kavanagh 56', 63'	Report	Devenny 45'; Ola-Adebomi 52', 78'; Mathurin 67', 68'; Grehan 81'	Stadium: Heritage Park; Attendance: 204; Referee: Aaron Bannister

18 September 2023	Ipswich Town	0–0	Birmingham City	Needham Market
19:00		Report		Stadium: Bloomfields; Attendance: 272; Referee: Paul Johnson

6 October 2023	Middlesbrough	2–0	Ipswich Town	Bishop Auckland
19:00	Kavanagh 39'; Nkrumah 88'	Report		Stadium: Heritage Park; Attendance: 180; Referee: James Westgate

10 November 2023	Crystal Palace	2–4	Ipswich Town	Sutton
13:00	Mažionis 53' (o.g.); Imray 72'	Report	Foyo 26', 35'; Valentine 38'; Ayinde 45+3' (pen.)	Stadium: VBS Community Stadium; Attendance: 209; Referee: Farai Hallam

12 November 2023	Middlesbrough	0–2	Birmingham City	Bishop Auckland
7:00		Report	Dixon 10'; Donovan 89'	Stadium: Heritage Park; Attendance: 148; Referee: David Richardson

24 November 2023	Birmingham City	1–4	Crystal Palace	Solihull
13:00	Williams 67'	Report	Wells-Morrison 5' (pen.); Ola-Adebomi 32', 38'; Ozoh 83'	Stadium: ARMCO Arena; Attendance: 50; Referee: Marcus Carmichael

8 December 2023	Birmingham City	4–2	Ipswich Town	Solihull
13:00	Dixon 3', 25'; Kamara 58'; Tattum 87'	Report	Olofinjana 65' (o.g.); Roberts 72'	Stadium: ARMCO Arena; Attendance: 50; Referee: James Oldham

11 December 2023	Crystal Palace	0–4	Middlesbrough	Sutton
13:00		Report	Kavanagh 20' (pen.), 25', 41', 54'	Stadium: VBS Community Stadium; Attendance: 112; Referee: Ryan Atkin

22 January 2024	Crystal Palace	3–0	Birmingham City	Sutton
13:00	Plange 11'; Raymond 60'; Imray 83'	Report		Stadium: VBS Community Stadium; Attendance: 158; Referee: Dane Mccarrick

23 January 2024	Ipswich Town	2–0	Middlesbrough	Needham Market
13:00	Nwabueze 15'; Boatswain 79'	Report		Stadium: Bloomfields; Attendance: 50; Referee: Callum Walchester

5 February 2024	Birmingham City	0–4	Middlesbrough	Solihull
13:00		Report	Bridge 27'; Matthews 39', 90'; McCabe 42'	Stadium: Damson Park; Attendance: 100; Referee: Ross Martin

5 February 2024	Ipswich Town	0–1	Crystal Palace	Needham Market
13:00		Report	Plange 55'	Stadium: Bloomfields; Attendance: 100; Referee: Martyn Mitchell

== Knockout stages ==
=== Round of 16 ===
The Round of 16 included all 8 group winners and runners up.

16 February 2024	AFC Bournemouth	2–3	Leeds United	Eastleigh
19:00	Landa 9'; Sadi 50'	Report	Perkins 41', 90+10'; Thomas 81'	Stadium: Silverlake Stadium; Attendance: 364; Referee: Ryan Atkin

20 February 2024	Fulham	2–1	Middlesbrough	New Malden
13:00	Gordon 49'; Pajaziti 82' (pen.)	Report	Finch 72' (pen.)	Stadium: Motspur Park; Attendance: 107; Referee: Richie Watkins

24 February 2024	Tottenham Hotspur	6–0	Fleetwood Town	Tottenham
7:00	Scarlett 27'; Lankshear 28', 33', 39'; John 55'; Santiago 71'	Report		Stadium: Tottenham Hotspur Stadium; Attendance: 2,048; Referee: James Oldham

26 February 2024	Chelsea	3–2	Norwich City	Kingston upon Thames
13:00	Stutter 10'; Washington 24', 82'	Report	Gibbs 45+1'; Mundle-Smith 71'	Stadium: Kingsmeadow; Attendance: 436; Referee: Matthew Russell

27 February 2024	Aston Villa	6–2	Blackburn Rovers	Bodymoor Heath
13:00	Young 7'; Kellyman 26', 38'; Moore 55'; Wilson 79', 90+4'	Report	Gilsenan 60' (pen.), 90+3'	Stadium: Bodymoor Heath Training Ground; Attendance: 222; Referee: Greg Rollason

27 February 2024	Sheffield United	5–1	Swansea City	Sheffield
13:00	Holgate 8'; Osula 40', 86'; Tinsdale 49'; Arblaster 62'	Report	Congreve 84' (pen.)	Stadium: Bramall Lane; Attendance: 234; Referee: Gareth Rhodes

1 March 2024	Crystal Palace	3–2	Leicester City	Beckenham
8:30	Farquhar 14'; Grist 30' (o.g.); Imray 66'	Report	Richards 47'; Popov 80'	Stadium: Crystal Palace Training Ground; Attendance: Behind Closed Doors; Referee: Stephen Parkinson

8 March 2024	Nottingham Forest	2–1 (a.e.t.)	Sunderland	Alfreton
19:00	McAdam 76', 110'	Report	Ryder 29'	Stadium: The Impact Arena; Attendance: 96; Referee: Greg Rollason
Note: Match was originally going to be played 23 February, but was postponed due to a waterlogged pitch.

=== Quarter-finals ===
The Quarter-finals included the 8 winners from the previous round.

30 March 2024	Leeds United	2–3	Chelsea	York
8:00	Cresswell 26'; Snowdon 29'	Report	Morgan 19'; McNeilly 21'; Sturge 52'	Stadium: LNER Community Stadium; Attendance: 245; Referee: Dale Baines

2 April 2024	Aston Villa	1–3	Tottenham Hotspur	Bodymoor Heath
13:00	Young 48'	Report	Santiago 25'; Donley 82'; Lankshear 90+6'	Stadium: Bodymoor Heath Training Ground; Attendance: 340; Referee: Robert Massey-Ellis

4 April 2024	Fulham	3–0	Crystal Palace	New Malden
13:00	Works 7'; Okkas 42'; Osmand 54'	Report		Stadium: Motspur Park; Attendance: 178; Referee: Stuart Morland

9 April 2024	Sheffield United	2–3	Nottingham Forest	Sheffield
19:00	Osula 45+6', 71' (pen.)	Report	Gardner 12'; Konaté 57', 60'	Stadium: Bramall Lane; Attendance: 385; Referee: Andrew Miller

=== Semi-finals ===
The Semi-finals included the four winners from the Previous Round.

19 April 2024	Chelsea	0–4	Fulham	Kingston upon Thames
13:00		Report	McCoy-Splatt 9'; Tanton 11'; Works 25'; Pajaziti 36'	Stadium: Kingsmeadow; Attendance: 544; Referee: Andrew Humphries

2 May 2024	Tottenham Hotspur	4–3	Nottingham Forest	Stevenage
19:00	Cassanova 59'; Lankshear 64' (pen.); Ajayi 90+1'; Santiago 90+6'	Report	Osong 15'; Konaté 22'; McDonnell 36'	Stadium: Broadhall Way; Attendance: 518; Referee: Farai Hallam

=== Final ===
16 May 2024
19:00

Fulham	4–0	Tottenham Hotspur
Osmand 3', 16', 45+2'; Okkas 53'	Report

Craven Cottage, Fulham
Attendance: 3,695
Referee: Matthew Russell

Note: Flags indicate national team as defined under FIFA eligibility rules; some limited exceptions apply. Players may hold more than one non-FIFA nationality.

Fulham
No.	Pos.	Nation	Player
1	GK	ENG	Alfie McNally
2	DF	COL	Devan Tanton
3	DF	ENG	Jonathan Esenga (substituted off) 69'
4	DF	ENG	Harvey Araujo
5	DF	CAN	Luc De Fougerolles
6	MF	NZL	Matt Dibley-Dias
7	FW	ENG	Terrell Works (substituted off) 58'
8	MF	JAM	Delano McCoy-Splatt
9	FW	WAL	Callum Osmand (substituted off) 83'
10	MF	CYP	George Okkas (substituted off) 83'
11	MF	ALB	Adrion Pajaziti
Substitutes:
13	GK	ENG	Marco Underwood
14	DF	SCO	Connor McAvoy (substituted on) 69'
16	FW	ENG	Lemar Gordon (substituted on) 58'
17	FW	ENG	Aaron Loupalo-Bi (substituted on) 83'
15	MF	ENG	Oliver Gofford (substituted on) 83'
Coach: (England) Hayden Mullins

Tottenham Hotspur
No.	Pos.	Nation	Player
1	GK	ENG	Luca Gunter
2	DF	ENG	Rio Kyerematen (substituted off) 77'
3	DF	ENG	Maeson King (substituted off) 51'
4	DF	JAM	Dante Cassanova
5	DF	ENG	Tyrell Ashcroft
6	MF	ENG	George Abbott
7	MF	ENG	Nile John
8	MF	JAM	Tyrese Hall
9	FW	ENG	Will Lankshear
10	MF	NIR	Jamie Donley (substituted off) 57'
11	FW	ESP	Yago Santiago (substituted off) 57'
Substitutes:
12	FW	THA	Jude Soonsup-Bell (substituted on) 57'
13	GK	IRL	Josh Keeley
14	FW	MAR	Yusuf Akhamrich (substituted on) 51'
15	MF	ENG	Max Robson (substituted on) 77'
16	FW	ENG	Damola Ajayi (substituted on) 78'
Coach: (England) Wayne Burnett
