= Josh Shaw =

Josh Shaw may refer to:

- Josh Shaw (defensive tackle) (born 1979), former American football defensive tackle
- Josh Shaw (defensive back) (born 1992), American football cornerback
- Josh Shaw (cricketer) (born 1996), English cricketer
- Josh Shaw (footballer) (born 2003), English footballer
