= SC Verl =

German association-football club

Coordinates: 51°53′00″N 8°30′48″E

- Full name: Sportclub Verl von 1924 e.V.
- Founded: 6 September 1924; 102 years ago
- Ground: Sportclub Arena
- Capacity: 5,207
- Chairman: Raimund Bertels
- Manager: Orest Shala
- League: 3. Liga
- 2025–26: 3. Liga, 6th of 20
Home colours	Away colours	Third colours

SC Verl is a German association football club based in Verl, North Rhine-Westphalia. The club was founded on 6 September 1924, and since 1970 has consistently played in the higher echelons of amateur football. The club was promoted to the professional 3. Liga in 2020.

== History ==
After almost 50 years, SC Verl advanced to the Landesliga Westfalen (IV) in 1970. Since then, SC Verl have been relegated only once (in 2003), qualified for newly introduced higher-class leagues three times out of four, won their league twice, and played the promotion round for 2. Bundesliga once (in 1991). Had they advanced, SC Verl would have been the smallest town ever to field a German pro football team. Their second bid for advancing to professional football was the 1994–95 season, when they finished second in the newly formed Regionalliga Nord (III), six points behind Arminia Bielefeld.

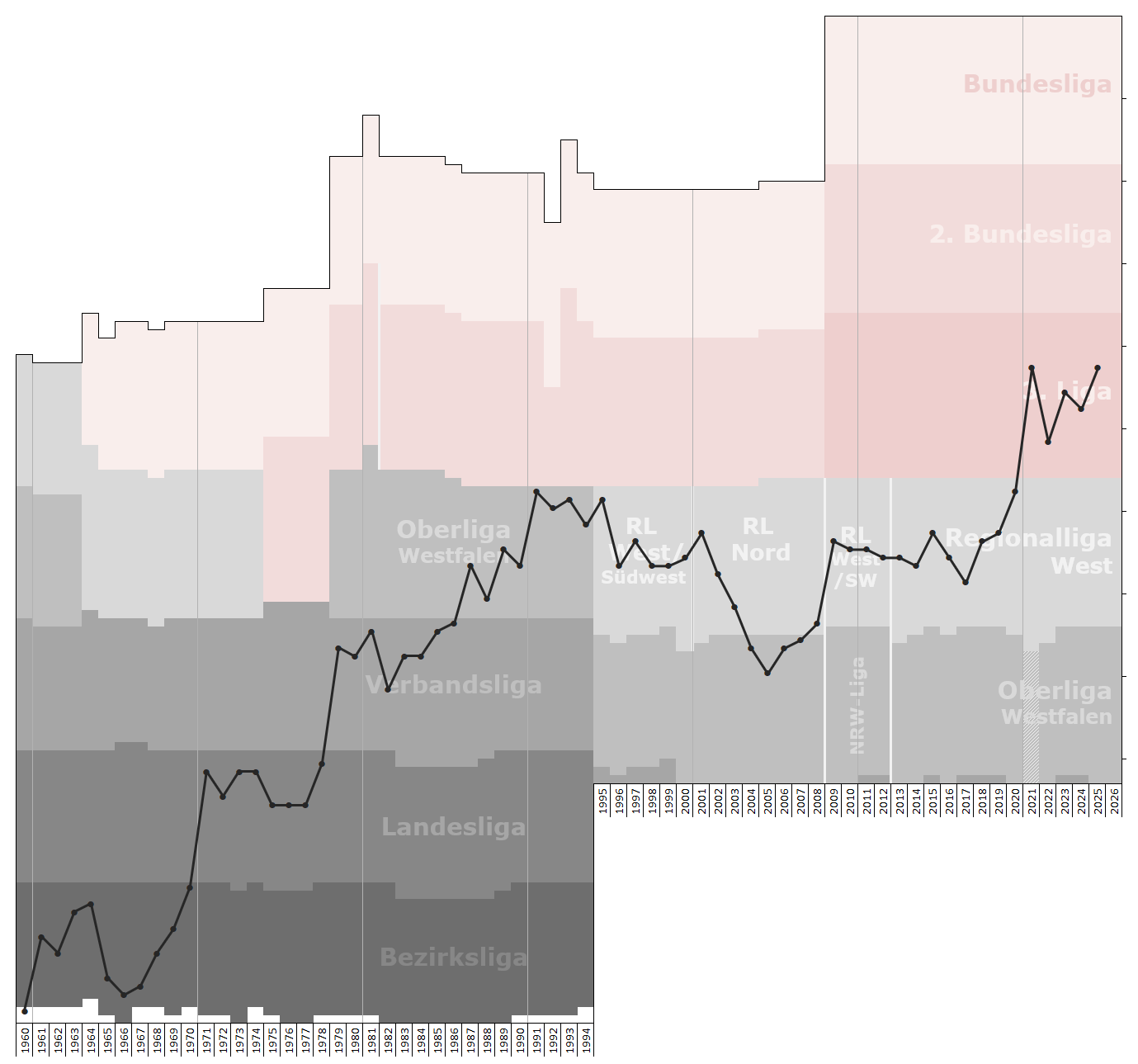
Historical chart of the club's league performance

=== German Cup appearances ===
SC Verl have appeared in the DFB-Pokal (German Cup) tournament six times. In 1979, they defeated VfB Oldenburg (III) and Spvgg Elversberg (IV) before going out to Stuttgarter Kickers (II). In 1992, they lost an all-amateur match in the first round. In 1999, they eliminated the Bundesliga club Borussia Mönchengladbach 6–5 on penalties, with Arne Friedrich scoring the decisive penalty. They were defeated by the Bundesliga side Eintracht Frankfurt in the second round. In both their fourth (2007) and fifth (2010) appearances, they lost their first round matches against TSV 1860 Munich (II) – in the 2010 match by 2–1 after they led 1–0 at half-time.

In the 2019–20 season Verl caused a major upset by beating the Bundesliga club Augsburg 2–1 in the first round and 2. Bundesliga Holstein Kiel on penalties in the second round before losing 1–0 to Union Berlin.

=== Relegation and non-qualification ===
In 2003, a 15th-place finish in the Regionalliga Nord (III) saw the team relegated for the first time in over thirty years. Some dispute surrounds Verl having to play the last game of the season in Paderborn during torrential rain, while Hamburger SV II were able to claim unplayable conditions and played the next day, securing a victory against KFC Uerdingen to remain in the league.

SC Verl had to play the Oberliga Westfalen (IV) for four years before winning the championship and advancing to Regionalliga again in 2007. One season later, the 3. Liga was introduced between the 2. Bundesliga and the Regionalliga, which in turn was split up from two into three divisions. SC Verl suffered through a poor 2007–08 campaign, finishing 18th and failing to qualify for the 3. Liga.

=== 2009 European football betting scandal ===
Two SC Verl games from the 2008–09 season – among over two hundred games by other clubs – were suspected of having been rigged by players, leading to significant attention by the press as, for several days, SC Verl was the only club actually named. The two players accused were summarily suspended, and their contracts were eventually terminated.

=== Amateur success ===
Having played at least fourth tier level since 1970, with 17 consecutive seasons in the third tier, makes SC Verl one of the most consistent top teams of Germany's amateur football. One of the smallest cities to field a fourth-tier football team, and together with neighbouring club SC Wiedenbrück one of only two clubs in the Regionalliga West working under amateur conditions (both players and coaches have day-time jobs), the club is without any liabilities – a direct result of a continued policy of "no credit financing".

The club achieved mid-table finishes for their first eleven seasons in the Regionalliga West after 2008.

=== Into 3. Liga ===
In the truncated 2019–20 season, the club finished second on the points-per-game rule, but advanced to the promotion play-offs after first-placed SV Rödinghausen declined to apply for a licence to play in the 3. Liga. Verl then beat Lokomotive Leipzig on away goals to win promotion to the 3. Liga for the first time.

In their first professional season, SC Verl performed strongly and finished 7th. Their second season went less smoothly, and they secured a third season only in their last match when they drew 1–1 against MSV Duisburg.

== Honours ==
The club's honours:

- Oberliga Westfalen
  - Champions: 1991, 2007
- Westphalia Cup
  - Winners: 1992, 1999, 2007, 2026

== Players ==
=== Current squad ===
As of 3 September 2026

Note: Flags indicate national team as defined under FIFA eligibility rules; some limited exceptions apply. Players may hold more than one non-FIFA nationality.

No.	Pos.	Nation	Player
1	GK	GER	Timo Schlieck (on loan from RB Leipzig)
2	DF	GER	Raphael Araoye
5	DF	GER	Nick Seidel
6	MF	GER	Joshua Eze
7	MF	GER	Amin Farouk
8	MF	GER	Dennis Waidner
9	FW	BIH	Alem Japaur
10	MF	GER	Bilal Yalçınkaya
11	MF	GER	Moritz Kaube
12	GK	GER	Julian Fuest
14	DF	GER	Paul Lehmann
17	MF	GER	Yari Otto
18	MF	GER	Fabian Wessig

No.	Pos.	Nation	Player
19	DF	GER	Niko Kijewski (captain)
20	FW	PHI	André Leipold (on loan from Pardubice)
21	MF	GER	Mika Clausen
22	DF	GER	Noah König (on loan from Greuther Fürth)
25	FW	GER	Tim Heike
26	MF	CYP	Antonio Foti
27	DF	GER	Felix Vogler
29	MF	GER	Emmanuel Bamba
30	MF	BIH	Almin Mešanović
32	GK	GER	Fabian Pekruhl
34	DF	GER	Janne Berner (on loan from Hertha BSC)
46	DF	GER	Tim Hoffmann

== Famous players ==
SC Verl has seen many players who went on to professional careers, the most notable being Arne Friedrich, who played his last amateur season with the club before joining Arminia Bielefeld in 2000, appeared for the national side and captained Hertha Berlin.

=== International players ===
- Musemestre Bamba – 3 A-Games for the Democratic Republic of the Congo national football team
- Ousseni Labo – 6 A-Games for the Togo national football team
- Etienne Barbara – 30 A-Games for the Malta national football team
- Heinrich Schmidtgal – 15 A-Games for the Kazakhstan national football team

== Stadium ==
After its establishment in 1924 and through part of the 1930s, SC Verl played at Auf der Heide. Sometime in the 1930s they moved to Birkenallee, where they remained until the end of World War II in 1945. Between 1945 and '55 their home ground was the Sportplatz Poststraße, and after 1955 the Stadion an der Poststraße. After capturing the Amateuroberliga Westfalen title in 1991, the team played its promotion round matches in the Heidewaldestadion Gütersloh in its failed attempt to advance to the 2. Bundesliga (as the Poststraße was not up to the task both capacity- and security-wise). The Stadion an der Poststraße was last expanded in 2015–16 to a capacity of 5,153, and renamed "Sportclub-Arena".
