= Adrion Pajaziti =

Albanian footballer (born 2002)

Personal information
- Full name: Adrion Pajaziti
- Date of birth: 16 November 2002 (age 23)
- Place of birth: London, England
- Height: 1.78 m (5 ft 10 in)
- Position: Midfielder

Team information
- Current team: Hajduk Split
- Number: 4

Youth career
- 2014–2021: Fulham

Senior career*
Years	Team	Apps	(Gls)
2021–2025	Fulham	0	(0)
2023	→ Haugesund (loan)	11	(0)
2024–2025	→ Gorica (loan)	23	(3)
2025–	Hajduk Split	39	(1)

International career^{‡}
2019	Albania U19	1	(0)
2021–2022	Kosovo U21	3	(0)
2022	Albania U20	1	(1)
2022–2024	Albania U21	13	(8)
2025–	Albania	8	(0)
- * Club domestic league appearances and goals as of 26 October 2026 ‡ National team caps and goals as of 6 June 2026

Adrion Pajaziti (born 16 November 2002) is a professional footballer who plays as a midfielder for Croatian Football League club Hajduk Split. Born in England, he was a former youth international for Albania, and played for the Kosovo U21 in a pair of matches before switching back to play eventually for the Albania national team.

== Club career ==
=== Fulham ===
Pajaziti started playing football in at the Fulham Academy at the age of twelve. He made his debut for the U18 team on 6 October 2018 aged only fifteen, coming on as a substitute at 81st minute in place of Ben Davis during a 7–0 victory against Reading U18.

Pajaziti signed a scholarship contract with the club on 1 July 2019 and was appointed captain of the U18 team at the start of the 2020–21 season. On 28 October 2020, he signed his first professional deal with Fulham, keeping him at the club until summer 2022. On 24 August 2021, Pajaziti made his first team debut in a 2–0 victory against Birmingham City as a starter, playing in the entire match.

==== Loan to Haugesund ====
Pajaziti made a loan move away from his boyhood club in late February 2023, signing for Norwegian club Haugesund for the 2023 season. He was given the number 10 shirt and the loan included an option to buy.

=== Croatia ===
On 5 September 2024, Pajaziti moved to Croatian club NK Gorica on loan until the end of season.

On 9 July 2025, he transferred to another Croatian club HNK Hajduk Split.

== International career ==
On 8 October 2019, Pajaziti received a call-up from Albania U19 for the friendly match against Poland U19, and made his debut after coming on as a substitute. He was planned to be called up from Albania U21 in March 2021 for a training camp held from 22 to 30 March 2021 and for unofficial friendly matches against Tirana and Bylis, but could not join the squad due to travel restrictions caused by the COVID-19 pandemic.

On 15 March 2021, Pajaziti received his first call-up from Kosovo U21 for the a friendly match against Qatar U23, but again could not join the team due to travel restrictions. On 17 March, he received another call-up from Kosovo U21 for the 2023 UEFA European Under-21 Championship qualification match against Andorra U21, but he was an unused substitute in this match. On 7 September 2021, Pajaziti debuted with Kosovo U21 came on 7 September 2021 in a 2023 UEFA European Under-21 Championship qualification match against England U21 after being named in the starting line-up.

On 17 September 2022, Pajaziti received a call-up from Albania U20 for the friendly matches against North Macedonia U20 and Croatia U20. Six days later, he debuted for Albania U20 in a friendly match against North Macedonia U20 as a starter whilst scoring his national team's only goal during a 1–3 away defeat. On 21 March 2025, Pajaziti debuted for the Albanian senior team in a 2026 FIFA World Cup qualification against England, his place of birth.

== Career statistics ==
=== Club ===
As of match played 26 October 2026

Appearances and goals by club, season and competition
Club	Season	League			National cup (Note: Includes Norwegian Cup, Croatian Cup)		League cup (Note: Includes EFL Cup)		Continental		Other		Total	
Club	Season	Division	Apps	Goals	Apps	Goals	Apps	Goals	Apps	Goals	Apps	Goals	Apps	Goals
Fulham U21	2020–21	—	—		—		—		—		3 (Note: Appearances in EFL Trophy)	0	3	0
Fulham U21	2023–24	—	—		—		—		—		2	0	2	0
Fulham U21	Total		—		—		—		—		5	0	5	0
Fulham	2021–22	EFL Championship	0	0	0	0	1	0	—		—		1	0
Fulham	2022–23	Premier League	0	0	0	0	0	0	—		—		0	0
Fulham	Total		0	0	0	0	1	0	—		—		1	0
Haugesund (loan)	2023	Eliteserien	11	0	2	2	—		—		—		13	2
Gorica (loan)	2024–25	1. HNL	23	3	1	0	—		—		—		24	3
Hajduk Split	2025–26	1. HNL	31	1	2	0	—		4 (Note: Appearances in UEFA Conference League)	0	—		37	1
Hajduk Split	2026–27	1. HNL	8	0	—		—		7 (Note: Appearances in UEFA Europa League)	1	—		15	1
Hajduk Split	Total		39	1	2	0	—		11	1	—		52	2
Career total			73	4	5	2	1	0	11	1	5	0	95	7

=== International ===
As of match played 6 June 2026

Appearances and goals by national team and year
National team	Year	Apps	Goals
Albania
Albania	2025	5	0
Albania	2026	3	0
Total		8	0

== Honours ==
Fulham U21

- Premier League Cup: 2023–24
