= Georgios Okkas =

Cypriot footballer (born 2003)

Personal information
- Date of birth: October 24, 2003 (age 23)
- Place of birth: Marousi, Greece
- Height: 1.77 m (5 ft 10 in)
- Position: Midfielder

Team information
- Current team: Olympiakos Nicosia
- Number: 6

Youth career
- 2014–2016: Arsenal Elite Academy
- 2016–2020: Anorthosis
- 2020–2024: Fulham

Senior career*
Years	Team	Apps	(Gls)
2024–2026	Rio Ave	0	(0)
2025	→ Feirense (loan)	0	(0)
2025–2026	→ Panionios (loan)	2	(0)

International career
2021	Cyprus U19	5	(0)
2022–2024	Cyprus U21	12	(1)
- * Club domestic league appearances and goals as of 20 April 2026

Georgios Okkas (Greek: Γιώργος Οκκάς; born 24 October 2003) is a footballer who plays as a midfielder for Cypriot First Division club Olympiakos Nicosia, he is a Cyprus youth international.

== Career ==
=== Youth years ===
George was born in Greece, due to his father, Ioannis Okkas, playing for AEK Athens at the time. He played for the Arsenal Elite Academy, based in Loutraki for two years between 2014 and 2016. After this, he moved to Cyprus, playing for Anorthosis in their youth setup.

=== Fulham ===
Okkas trained with the youth academy of English Premier League side Arsenal at the age of sixteen. George eventually signed for Fulham on a scholarship deal in the summer of 2020.

He appeared several times on the bench for Steve Wigley's Under-18s at Fulham and made his league debut during a 2–1 win away at West Ham United. He later went on to make another four appearances throughout the 2020/21 season. George was far more involved throughout the 2021/22 season, making 24 appearances in the centre of midfield. He also gained a solid amount of international experience, featuring regularly for Cyprus Under-21s. He went on to make 12 appearances for our Under-21s across the 2022/23 season.

Okkas was released by Fulham in 2024.

=== Rio Ave ===
On 9 July 2024, Okkas joined Portuguese Primeira Liga club Rio Ave on a three-year contract. During his time at Rio Ave, Okkas was also profiled by AF Global Football in a feature on Cypriot youth internationals playing abroad.

== Style of play ==
Okkas mainly operates as a defensive midfielder.

== Personal life ==
Okkas is the son of former Cyprus international footballer Ioannis Okkas. Okkas' mother is a Cypriot who was born in Australia.

== Honours ==
Fulham U21

- Premier League Cup: 2023–24
