= Devan Tanton =

Colombian footballer (born 2004)

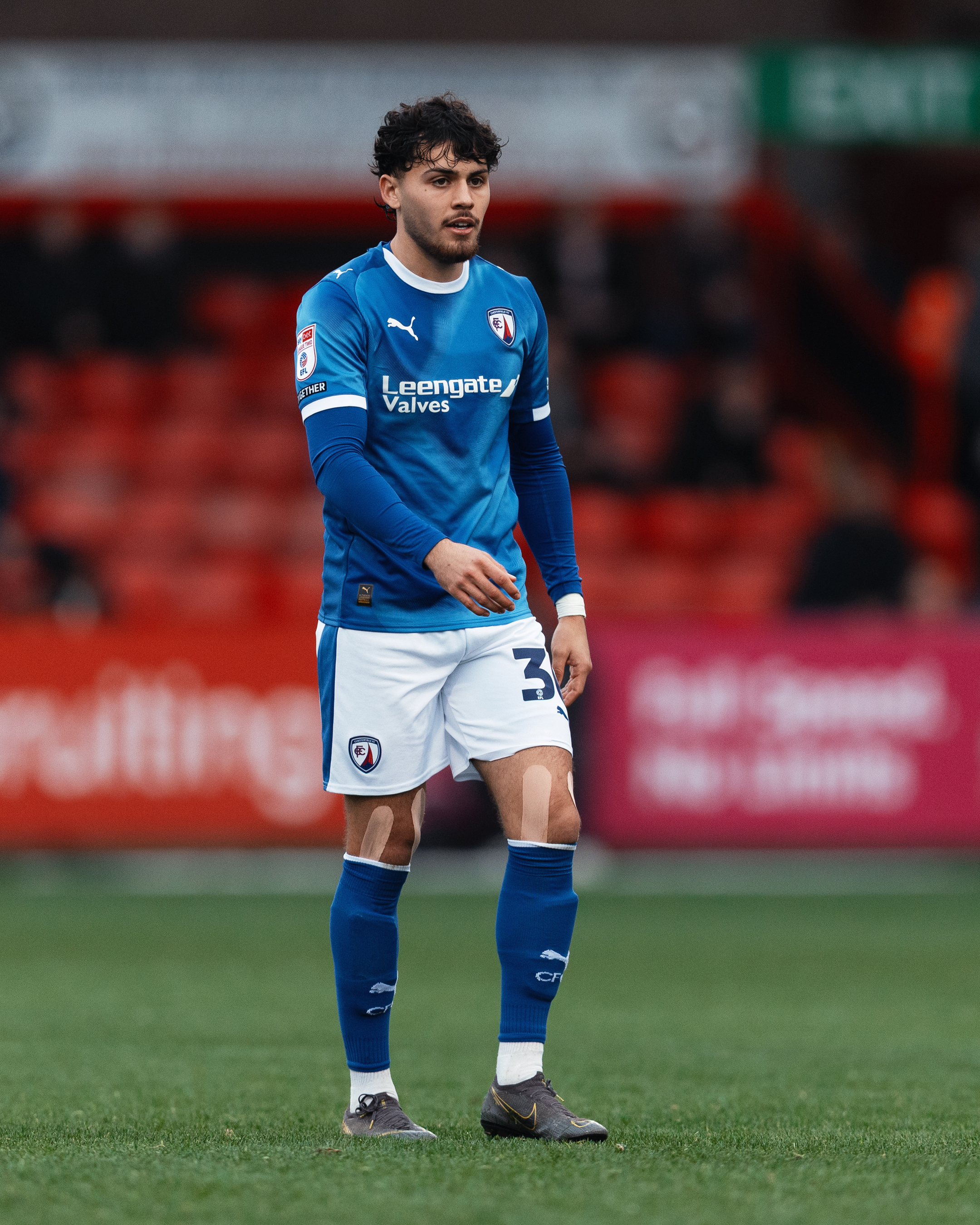

Personal information
- Full name: Devan Austin Tanton Pedraza
- Date of birth: 3 January 2004 (age 22)
- Place of birth: San Antonio, Texas, U.S.
- Height: 1.75 m (5 ft 9 in)
- Position: Right-back

Youth career
- 2012–2013: FC Elite Academy
- 2013–2020: Cornellà
- 2021–2022: Fulham

Senior career*
Years	Team	Apps	(Gls)
2022–2026	Fulham	0	(0)
2022	→ Walton & Hersham (loan)	3	(0)
2024–2025	→ Chesterfield (loan)	8	(0)
2025–2026	→ Chesterfield (loan)	15	(0)

International career^{‡}
2019	United States U15	10	(0)
2020	United States U17	3	(0)
2022–	Colombia U20	8	(0)
2024–	Colombia U23	2	(0)
2023–	Colombia	1	(0)
- * Club domestic league appearances and goals as of 17:16, 12 January 2025 (UTC) ‡ National team caps and goals as of 13 February 2024

Devan Austin Tanton Pedraza (born 3 January 2004) is a professional footballer who plays as a right-back. Born in the United States, he represents the Colombia national team.

== Club career ==
Born in San Antonio, Texas to an American father and Colombian mother, Tanton was raised in Orlando, Florida, where he joined the FC Elite Academy at the age of eight. A year later, while at a Barcelona Academy camp in Florida, he was scouted and invited to sign for Spanish side Cornellà.

Fulham

While playing for the United States in an under-17 game against England at the St George's Park National Football Centre, he was scouted by Fulham, who he went on to sign for in January 2021.

In September 2022, he was loaned to Isthmian League side Walton & Hersham until January 2023. He went on to make eight appearances in all competitions for The Swans, before returning to Fulham. He made his professional debut with Fulham in a 3–1 EFL Cup win over Ipswich Town on 1 November 2023.

Chesterfield

On 5 August 2024, Tanton joined newly promoted League Two side Chesterfield on a season-long loan deal. He was recalled in January 2025 after a series of injuries led to just 8 appearances.

On 8 July 2025, Tanton rejoined Chesterfield on a season-long loan deal. Tanton featured 18 times in all competitions across the first half of the season for the Spireites, before returning to Fulham in January.

== International career ==
Tanton initially represented the United States at under-15 and under-17 level, receiving his first call up to the latter in February 2020.

He switched his allegiance to Colombia in September 2022, getting an assist on his debut for the under-20 side in a 4–0 win against the Dominican Republic. He followed this up with an appearances in a friendly against Ecuador in November 2022.

== Career statistics ==
=== Club ===
As of match played 18 January 2023

Appearances and goals by club, season and competition
Club	Season	League			FA Cup (Note: Includes qualification)		EFL Cup		Other		Total	
Club	Season	Division	Apps	Goals	Apps	Goals	Apps	Goals	Apps	Goals	Apps	Goals
Fulham	2022–23	Premier League	0	0	0	0	0	0	0	0	0	0
Walton & Hersham (loan)	2022–23	Isthmian League	3	0	3	0	–		2 (Note: One appearance in FA Trophy qualification, one appearance in the Surrey Senior Cup.)	0	8	0
Career total			3	0	3	0	0	0	2	0	8	0

=== International ===
As of match played 10 December 2023

Appearances and goals by national team and year
National team	Year	Apps	Goals
Colombia	2023	1	0
Total		1	0

== Honours ==
Fulham U21

- Premier League Cup: 2023–24
