= Reece Hall =

English footballer

Personal information
- Full name: Reece Daniel Hall
- Date of birth: 25 September 2003 (age 23)
- Place of birth: Birmingham, England
- Position: Defender

Team information
- Current team: Kidderminster Harriers
- Number: 2

Youth career
- –2023: West Bromwich Albion

Senior career*
Years	Team	Apps	(Gls)
2023–2025	West Bromwich Albion	0	(0)
2023–2024	→ Hereford (loan)	0	(0)
2025	Rushall Olympic	0	(0)
2025–	Kidderminster Harriers	5	(0)
- * Club domestic league appearances and goals as of 13:07, 19 September 2025 (UTC)

Reece Daniel Hall (born 25 September 2003) is an English footballer who plays as a defender for National League club Kidderminster Harriers.

== Career ==
Hall was a part of the West Bromwich Albion U23 team which won the Premier League Cup in 2022. On 1 July 2022, he signed his first professional contract with the club, penning a two-year deal.

On 20 December 2023, Hall joined National League North side Hereford on a month-long loan.

On 13 August 2024, Hall made his professional debut for West Bromwich Albion in the first round of the EFL Cup, starting in a 2–1 defeat against Fleetwood Town.

He was released by Albion at the end of the 2024–25 season.

On 16 September 2025, Hall joined Northern Premier League Premier Division club Rushall Olympic. On 4 October 2025, he joined National League North side Kidderminster Harriers.

== Career statistics ==
As of match played 25 October 2025

Appearances and goals by club, season and competition
Club	Season	League			FA Cup		EFL Cup		Other		Total	
Club	Season	Division	Apps	Goals	Apps	Goals	Apps	Goals	Apps	Goals	Apps	Goals
West Bromwich Albion	2023–24	Championship	0	0	0	0	0	0	0	0	0	0
West Bromwich Albion	2024–25	Championship	0	0	0	0	1	0	—		1	0
West Bromwich Albion	Total		0	0	0	0	1	0	3	0	4	0
Hereford (loan)	2023–24	National League North	0	0	—		—		0	0	0	0
West Bromwich Albion U21	2024–25	—			—		—		3 (Note: Appearances in National League Cup)	0	3	0
Kidderminster Harriers	2025–26	National League North	5	0	0	0	—		0	0	5	0
Career total			5	0	0	0	1	0	3	0	9	0

== Honours ==
West Bromwich Albion

- Premier League Cup: 2021–22

Kidderminster Harriers

- National League North play-offs: 2026
