= Fenton Heard =

English footballer

Personal information
- Date of birth: 1 October 2004 (age 22)
- Place of birth: England
- Position: Midfielder

Team information
- Current team: Rushall Olympic

Youth career
- –2025: West Bromwich Albion

Senior career*
Years	Team	Apps	(Gls)
2023–2025	West Bromwich Albion	0	(0)
2023	→ Hednesford Town (loan)	5	(0)
2024–2025	→ Rushall Olympic (loan)	1	(0)
2025–	Rushall Olympic	2	(0)
- * Club domestic league appearances and goals as of 02:33, 13 August 2025 (UTC)

Fenton Heard (born 1 October 2004) is an English semi-professional footballer who plays as a midfielder for Southern League Premier Division Central club Rushall Olympic.

== Career ==
=== West Bromwich Albion ===
Heard signed for Hednesford Town on 23 March 2023 on loan until the end of the season. Upon his return to West Brom, Heard signed his first professional contract with the club on 7 July 2023. On 7 January 2024, he made his debut for the club starting in a 4–1 win against Aldershot Town in the third round of the FA Cup.

On 10 July 2024, Heard signed a new one-year deal with a year's option with the club.

On 31 October 2024, Heard signed for National League North club Rushall Olympic on a month-long loan. He suffered a foot injury 11 minutes into his second match and did not make any further appearances before his loan expired.

Heard was released by West Bromwich Albion at the end of the 2024–25 season.

=== Non-League ===
On 8 August 2025, Heard re-joined now-Northern Premier League Premier Division club Rushall Olympic.

== Career statistics ==
As of match played 13 August 2025

Appearances and goals by club, season and competition
Club	Season	League			FA Cup		League Cup		Other		Total	
Club	Season	Division	Apps	Goals	Apps	Goals	Apps	Goals	Apps	Goals	Apps	Goals
West Bromwich Albion	2023–24	Championship	0	0	1	0	0	0	—		1	0
West Bromwich Albion	2024–25	Championship	0	0	0	0	1	0	—		1	0
West Bromwich Albion	Total		0	0	1	0	1	0	0	0	2	0
Hednesford Town (loan)	2022–23	SL Premier Division Central	5	0	—		—		—		5	0
West Bromwich Albion U21	2024–25	—			—		—		1 (Note: Appearance in National League Cup)	0	1	0
Rushall Olympic (loan)	2024–25	National League North	1	0	1	0	—		0	0	2	0
Rushall Olympic	2025–26	NPL Premier Division	2	0	0	0	—		0	0	2	0
Career total			8	0	2	0	1	0	1	0	12	0
