= Theo Williams =

English footballer

Personal information
- Full name: Theo Williams
- Date of birth: 9 October 2003 (age 23)
- Height: 1.75 m (5 ft 9 in)
- Position: Forward

Team information
- Current team: Peterborough Sports (on loan from King's Lynn Town)
- Number: 29

Youth career
- –2021: Sheffield United

Senior career*
Years	Team	Apps	(Gls)
2021–2023	Sheffield United	0	(0)
2023	→ Darlington (loan)	7	(0)
2023	→ Farsley Celtic (loan)	14	(6)
2023–2024	Fleetwood Town	1	(0)
2023	→ Torquay United (loan)	10	(1)
2024–	King's Lynn Town	19	(0)
2025	→ Rushall Olympic (loan)	7	(2)
- * Club domestic league appearances and goals as of 01:44, 28 September 2024 (UTC)

Theo Williams (born 9 October 2003) is an English footballer who plays as a forward for Peterborough Sports on loan from King's Lynn Town.

== Career ==
Having progressed through the youth system of Sheffield United since joining at under-12 level, Williams signed his first professional contract in July 2021. During the 2022–23 season, he spent time on loan with National League North clubs Darlington and Farsley Celtic.

In July 2023, Williams joined League One club Fleetwood Town on a two-year deal On 26 August 2023, he made his league debut for the club as a substitute in a 1–0 defeat to Shrewsbury Town. In October 2023, he joined National League South club Torquay United on a short-term loan deal.

On 27 September 2024, Williams joined National League North side King's Lynn Town on a permanent deal. In March 2025, he joined Rushall Olympic on loan. On 29 August 2025, he joined Peterborough Sports on loan until the end of November.

== Career statistics ==
As of end of 2024–25 season

Appearances and goals by club, season and competition
Club	Season	League			FA Cup		League Cup		Other		Total	
Club	Season	Division	Apps	Goals	Apps	Goals	Apps	Goals	Apps	Goals	Apps	Goals
Darlington (loan)	2022–23	National League North	7	0	—		—		—		7	0
Farsley Celtic (loan)	2022–23	National League North	14	6	—		—		—		14	6
Fleetwood Town	2023–24	League One	1	0	0	0	0	0	0	0	1	0
Torquay United (loan)	2023–24	National League South	10	1	—		—		2 (Note: Appearance in FA Trophy)	2	12	3
King's Lynn Town	2024–25	National League North	17	0	3	0	—		2 (Note: One appearance in FA Trophy, one appearance in National League North play-offs)	0	21	0
Rushall Olympic (loan)	2024–25	National League North	7	2	0	0	—		0	0	7	2
Career total			56	9	3	0	0	0	4	2	62	11
