= Josh Shaw (footballer) =

English footballer

Personal information
- Full name: Joshua Aaron Shaw
- Date of birth: 5 October 2003 (age 23)
- Place of birth: Manchester, England
- Height: 6 ft 0 in (1.83 m)
- Position: Defender

Team information
- Current team: Hyde United

Youth career
- Everton
- West Bromwich Albion

Senior career*
Years	Team	Apps	(Gls)
2024–2025	West Bromwich Albion	0	(0)
2025	→ Marine (loan)	12	(0)
2025–	Hyde United	1	(0)
- * Club domestic league appearances and goals as of 18:17, 10 September 2025 (UTC)

Joshua Aaron Shaw (born 5 October 2003) is an English professional footballer who plays as a defender for Northern Premier League Premier Division club Hyde United.

== Club career ==
On 1 July 2022, Shaw signed his first professional contract with West Brom, penning a two-year deal. He made his professional debut for West Brom on 7 January 2024, coming on as a substitute in a 4–1 win against Aldershot Town in the FA Cup third round.

On 11 February 2025, Shaw joined National League North side Marine on a short-term loan.

On 30 August 2025, Shaw made his debut for Northern Premier League Premier Division side Hyde United.

== Career statistics ==
As of match played 21 April 2025

Appearances and goals by club, season and competition
Club	Season	League			FA Cup		League Cup		Other		Total	
Club	Season	Division	Apps	Goals	Apps	Goals	Apps	Goals	Apps	Goals	Apps	Goals
West Bromwich Albion	2023–24	Championship	0	0	1	0	0	0	—		1	0
West Bromwich Albion	2024–25	Championship	0	0	0	0	0	0	—		0	0
Marine (loan)	2024–25	National League North	12	0	0	0	0	0	—		12	0
Career total			12	0	1	0	0	0	0	0	13	0
