= Hakeem Sandah =

English association football player

Personal information
- Full name: Hakeem Kwabena Owusu Sandah
- Date of birth: 15 March 2005 (age 21)
- Place of birth: Lambeth, England
- Position: Midfielder

Team information
- Current team: Aldershot Town
- Number: 11

Youth career
- Chelsea
- –2021: Tottenham Hotspur
- 2021–2023: Huddersfield Town
- 2024: Colchester United

Senior career*
Years	Team	Apps	(Gls)
2024–2025	Colchester United	0	(0)
2024	→ Maldon & Tiptree (loan)	10	(0)
2024	→ Maldon & Tiptree (loan)	6	(0)
2025	→ Walton & Hersham (loan)	5	(0)
2025–2026	Farnborough	38	(6)
2026–	Aldershot Town	0	(0)
- * Club domestic league appearances and goals as of 18:04, 9 June 2026 (UTC)

Hakeem Kwabena Owusu Sandah (born 15 March 2005) is an English professional footballer who plays as a midfielder for National League club Aldershot Town.

== Club career ==
After spending his early years with both Chelsea and Tottenham Hotspur, Sandah represented Huddersfield Town from 2021 to 2023, leaving the club upon the completion of his scholarship.

After leaving, he trialled with Blackburn Rovers before signing for Colchester United in January 2024, joining their under-21s side. After loan spells with Maldon & Tiptree during both the 2023–24 and 2024–25 campaigns, Sandah made his professional debut in November during an FA Cup away defeat to Swindon Town, coming on for Rob Hunt. After making two additional appearances for the club in the EFL Trophy, Sandah joined Walton & Hersham on a one-month loan in February 2025, where he played in five matches. Following the conclusion of the 2024–25 campaign, it was announced that Sandah would leave Colchester United at the end of his contract in June 2025.

On 9 August 2025, Sandah agreed to join National League South side, Farnborough following a successful trial period. On 21 May 2026, Sandah confirmed that he would be leaving the club at the end of his contract in June.

On 9 June 2026, Sandah agreed to join National League club Aldershot Town.

== Career statistics ==
As of match played 25 April 2026

Appearances and goals by club, season and competition
Club	Season	League			FA Cup		EFL Cup		Other		Total	
Club	Season	Division	Apps	Goals	Apps	Goals	Apps	Goals	Apps	Goals	Apps	Goals
Colchester United	2023–24	League Two	0	0	—		—		—		0	0
Colchester United	2024–25	League Two	0	0	1	0	0	0	2 (Note: Appearances in the EFL Trophy)	0	3	0
Colchester United	Total		0	0	1	0	0	0	2	0	3	0
Maldon & Tiptree (loan)	2023–24	Isthmian League North Division	10	0	—		—		—		10	0
Maldon & Tiptree (loan)	2024–25	Isthmian League North Division	6	0	—		—		2 (Note: Appearances in the FA Trophy)	0	8	0
Maldon & Tiptree (loan)	Total		16	0	—		—		2	0	18	0
Walton & Hersham (loan)	2024–25	Southern League Premier Division South	5	0	—		—		—		5	0
Farnborough	2025–26	National League South	38	6	3	0	—		1	0	42	6
Career total			59	6	4	0	0	0	5	0	68	6
