= Will Lankshear =

English footballer (born 2005)

Personal information
- Full name: William Terence Lankshear
- Date of birth: 20 April 2005 (age 21)
- Place of birth: Welwyn Garden City, England
- Height: 6 ft 2 in (1.88 m)
- Position: Striker

Team information
- Current team: Middlesbrough
- Number: 7

Youth career
- –2021: Arsenal
- 2021–2022: Sheffield United
- 2022–2024: Tottenham Hotspur

Senior career*
Years	Team	Apps	(Gls)
2024–2026	Tottenham Hotspur	3	(0)
2025	→ West Bromwich Albion (loan)	11	(0)
2025–2026	→ Oxford United (loan)	44	(11)
2026–	Middlesbrough	14	(13)

International career^{‡}
2023–2024	England U19	5	(3)
2024–2025	England U20	4	(1)
2026–	England U21	3	(1)
- * Club domestic league appearances and goals as of 17:41, 21 November 2026 (UTC) ‡ National team caps and goals as of 10 October 2026

William Terence Lankshear (born 20 April 2005) is an English professional footballer who plays as a striker for EFL Championship club Middlesbrough.

== Club career ==
=== Early career ===
Lankshear started his career with Arsenal at youth level before being released. He subsequently joined Sheffield United, agreeing a scholarship contract with the club in February 2021. Lankshear was the top scorer in the division as he captained Sheffield United to the under-18 Professional Development League Division 2 title in 2021–22. He scored 38 goals in 48 appearances for the Sheffield United age-group teams in total. Sheffield United first team manager Paul Heckingbottom described him as having "a good gift to score goals", and Sheffield United were ready to offer him a new contract. However, amid interest from Premier League club Brentford, Tottenham Hotspur agreed to pay £2 million to Sheffield United for him on 31 August 2022, with £1 million of the fee guaranteed and further payments thought to be performance-related bonuses. Some reports suggest the fee could rise to £2.5 million with Heckingbottom admitting it was "a good deal" for the youngster considering they had picked him up for free only a year previously. Lankshear signed a contract with Tottenham running until the summer of 2025.

=== Tottenham Hotspur ===
On 8 October 2022, Lankshear made his debut as a substitute for Spurs' under-18s with his team 3–1 down against the Wolverhampton Wanderers youth side, and scored a quick-fire brace to level the match. Lankshear paid tribute to the strength and conditioning work he had undertaken since joining Tottenham Hotspur. Playing in the UEFA Youth League against Sporting Lisbon, Lankshear scored after 46 seconds.

Lankshear scored 23 goals for Tottenham's U21 team in the 2023–24 Premier League 2 season, including a brace in the 3–1 play-off final victory against Sunderland. His performances saw him named as the league's Player of the Season.

On 3 October 2024, Lankshear made his senior debut for Tottenham, starting a 2–1 away win over Hungarian champions Ferencvárosi TC in the UEFA Europa League. He scored his first goal for the club on 7 November in a 3–2 away defeat to Galatasaray in the same competition, before being sent off for receiving two yellow cards.

==== Loan to West Bromwich Albion ====
On 31 January 2025, Lankshear joined Championship club West Bromwich Albion on loan for the remainder of the 2024–25 season. He made his first appearance for the club on 8 February 2025 as a substitute for Isaac Price, in a 2–1 home win over Sheffield Wednesday.

==== Loan to Oxford United ====
On 5 August 2025, Lankshear joined Championship side Oxford United on a season-long loan. He made his debut on the opening day of the 2025–26 season, a 1–0 home defeat to Portsmouth. Although the season ended in relegation for the club, he was named as the club's Young Player of the Season.

=== Middlesbrough ===
On 22 July 2026, Lankshear joined Championship club Middlesbrough on a five-year contract for an initial fee that was reported to be around £10m, which could rise to a club-record £20m if various performance-related add-ons are met. He scored on his debut during the 1–0 victory against Wrexham in the EFL Cup first round on 7 August 2026. His strong start to the 2026–27 season continued, being named EFL Young Player of the Month for September and EFL Championship Player of the Month for October.

== International career ==
Lankshear scored on his debut for England U19 on 15 November 2023, in a 6–0 win over Romania.

On 10 October 2024, Lankshear made his U20 debut during a 2–1 win over Italy in Frosinone.

On 29 August 2025, Lankshear was called up to the England under-21s. On 25 September 2026, he scored on his debut for England under-21s in a 4–2 win over Kazakhstan.

== Style of play ==
Lankshear has been described as a "poacher" who is "outstanding in front of goal".

== Personal life ==
Lankshear is reportedly a Tottenham Hotspur supporter.

He is the younger brother of Gateshead defender Alex Lankshear.

== Career statistics ==
As of match played 21 November 2026

Appearances and goals by club, season and competition
Club	Season	League			FA Cup		EFL Cup		Continental		Other		Total	
Club	Season	Division	Apps	Goals	Apps	Goals	Apps	Goals	Apps	Goals	Apps	Goals	Apps	Goals
Tottenham Hotspur U21	2022–23	—			—		—		—		1 (Note: Appearances in EFL Trophy)	0	1	0
Tottenham Hotspur U21	2023–24	—			—		—		—		3	2	3	2
Tottenham Hotspur U21	2024–25	—			—		—		—		1	1	1	1
Tottenham Hotspur U21	Total		—		—		—		—		5	3	5	3
Tottenham Hotspur	2024–25	Premier League	3	0	0	0	0	0	3 (Note: Appearances in UEFA Europa League)	1	—		6	1
Tottenham Hotspur	2025–26	Premier League	0	0	0	0	0	0	0	0	—		0	0
Tottenham Hotspur	Total		3	0	0	0	0	0	3	1	0	0	6	1
West Bromwich Albion (loan)	2024–25	Championship	11	0	—		—		—		—		11	0
Oxford United (loan)	2025–26	Championship	44	11	2	1	1	0	—		—		47	12
Middlesbrough	2026–27	Championship	14	13	0	0	3	2	—		—		17	15
Career total			72	24	2	1	4	2	3	1	5	3	86	31

== Honours ==
Tottenham Hotspur

- UEFA Europa League: 2024–25

Individual

- Oxford United Young Player of the Season: 2025–26
- EFL Young Player of the Month: September 2026
- EFL Championship Player of the Month: October 2026
