= Raphael Araoye =

German professional footballer (born 2004)

Personal information
- Date of birth: 22 April 2004 (age 22)
- Place of birth: Hamburg, Germany
- Position: Central defender

Team information
- Current team: SC Verl
- Number: 2

Youth career
- –2023: Bristol City

Senior career*
Years	Team	Apps	(Gls)
2023-2026	Bristol City	0	(0)
2023-2024	Weston Super Mare (loan)	15	(0)
2024	Yeovil (loan)	5	(0)
2024	Weston Super Mare (loan)	6	(0)
2026-	SC Verl	1	(0)
- * Club domestic league appearances and goals as of 00:15, 28 August 2026 (UTC)

Raphael Araoye (born 22 April 2004) is a German professional footballer who plays as a central defender for 3. Liga club SC Verl.

== Career ==
A central defender born in Hamburg, Araoye joined the Bristol City youth set-up at ten years-old. In August 2022, he signed a three-year professional contract with the club. In July 2023, Araoye was included in the Bristol City first-team squad on a pre-season training camp in Austria. He subsequently was included in the first-team substitutes on match-day one of the 2023-24 season as Bristol City hosted Preston North End on 5 August 2023.

He joined Yeovil Town F.C. on a six-month loan in August 2024. The loan was ended in October 2024 and he spent the rest of the year on loan at Weston Super Mare returning to Bristol City in January 2025. He played on trial with EFL League Two club Crawley Town in July 2025. However, he signed a new one-year contract extension with Bristol City later that month.

After spending 12 years in England, Araoye returned to Germany and signed for German 3. Liga club SC Verl in January 2026. He made his league debut for the club on 25 August 2026 against MSV Duisburg.

== Style of play ==
Araoye has been described as having many of the attributes needed to play professionally as a centre-half by former Bristol City teammate Rob Atkinson, as well as having a “good left foot“.
