= Danté Cassanova =

English/Jamaican footballer (born 2004)

Personal information
- Full name: Danté Jamel Cassanova
- Date of birth: 21 June 2004 (age 22)
- Place of birth: London, England
- Position: Defender

Youth career
- 2020–2025: Tottenham Hotspur

Senior career*
Years	Team	Apps	(Gls)
2025–2026	Tottenham Hotspur	0	(0)
- * Club domestic league appearances and goals as of 21:40, 30 January 2025 (UTC) ‡ National team caps and goals as of 21:40, 30 January 2025 (UTC)

Danté Jamel Cassanova (born 21 June 2004) is a professional footballer who last played for Tottenham Hotspur as a defender.

== Club career ==
A product of the Tottenham Hotspur academy, and originally a defensive midfielder, Cassanova signed a two-year scholarship deal with the club and had a third year option exercised by the club in the summer of 2022. That year, he captained the club at U18 level but also had a trial with Derby County. He would go on to feature at both right-back and centre back for Spurs U21.

Cassanova was called up to train with the Spurs first-team squad in April 2023 under interim managers Cristian Stellini and Ryan Mason and signed his first professional contract with the club in the summer of 2023. He was named in the senior matchday squad for the first time in a UEFA Europa League match against the Hungarian club Ferencvárosi TC on 3 October 2024. He signed a new contract with Tottenham Hotspur on 20 June 2025, running until 2027.

== International career ==
In March 2023, Cassanova was called up by the Jamaica national football team for their friendly matches against Trinidad and Tobago by manager Heimir Hallgrímsson.

== Personal life ==
Born in London, Cassanova attended The Harefield Academy in Uxbridge.
