= 2024–25 West Bromwich Albion F.C. season =

147th season in existence of West Bromwich Albion FC

West Bromwich Albion
2024–25 season
- Owner: Bilkul Football WBA
- Chairman: Shilen Patel
- Manager: Carlos Corberán (until 24 December); Chris Brunt (interim); Tony Mowbray (from 17 January until 21 April); James Morrison (interim)
- Stadium: The Hawthorns
- Championship: 9th
- FA Cup: Third round
- EFL Cup: First round
- Top goalscorer: League: Josh Maja (12); All: Josh Maja (12)
- Highest home attendance: 25,951 v Oxford United (22 February 2025, EFL Championship)
- Lowest home attendance: 23,305 v Blackburn Rovers (12 February 2025, EFL Championship)
- Average home league attendance: 25,057
- Biggest win: 5–1 v Portsmouth (Home, 25 January 2025, EFL Championship)
- Biggest defeat: 1–5 v Bournemouth (Away, 11 January 2025, FA Cup)
| Home colours | Away colours | Third colours |

The 2024–25 season is the 147th season in the history of West Bromwich Albion Football Club and their fourth consecutive season in the Championship. In addition to the domestic league, the club would also participate in the FA Cup, and the EFL Cup.

== Squad ==
As of 1 February 2025

| No. | Name | Position | Nationality | Place of birth | Date of birth (age) | Signed from | Date signed | Fee | Contract end |
Goalkeepers
| 20 | Josh Griffiths | GK | (England) | Hereford | 5 September 2001 (age 25) | Academy | 1 July 2020 | —N/a | 30 June 2027 |
| 23 | Joe Wildsmith | GK | (England) | Sheffield | 28 December 1995 (age 30) | Derby County | 10 July 2024 | Free Transfer | 30 June 2026 |
| 30 | Ted Cann | GK | (England) | England | 27 December 2000 (age 25) | Academy | 1 July 2017 | —N/a | 30 June 2025 |
Defenders
| 2 | Darnell Furlong | RB | (England) | Luton | 31 October 1995 (age 31) | Queens Park Rangers | 23 July 2019 | £1,700,000 | 30 June 2027 |
| 3 | Mason Holgate | RB | (Jamaica) | (England) Doncaster | 22 October 1996 (age 30) | Everton | 20 August 2024 | Loan | 30 June 2024 |
| 5 | Kyle Bartley | CB | (England) | Stockport | 22 May 1991 (age 35) | Swansea City | 16 July 2018 | £3,800,000 | 30 June 2025 |
| 6 | Semi Ajayi | CB | (Nigeria) | (England) Crayford | 9 November 1993 (age 33) | Rotherham United | 20 July 2019 | £1,650,000 | 30 June 2025 |
| 14 | Torbjørn Heggem | CB | (Norway) | Trondheim | 12 January 1999 (age 27) | (Sweden) IF Brommapojkarna | 4 July 2024 | £500,000 | 30 June 2027 |
| 24 | Gianluca Frabotta | LB | (Italy) | Rome | 24 June 1999 (age 27) | (Italy) Juventus | 6 August 2024 | Undisclosed | 30 June 2027 |
Midfielders
| 4 | Callum Styles | AM | (Hungary) | (England) Bury | 27 March 2000 (age 26) | Barnsley | 24 August 2024 | Undisclosed | 30 June 2028 |
| 8 | Jayson Molumby | CM | (Republic of Ireland) | Cappoquin | 6 August 1999 (age 27) | Brighton & Hove Albion | 1 July 2022 | £1,000,000 | 30 June 2028 |
| 10 | John Swift | AM | (England) | Portsmouth | 23 June 1995 (age 31) | Reading | 1 July 2022 | Free Transfer | 30 June 2025 |
| 17 | Ousmane Diakité | CM | (Mali) | Mali | 25 July 2000 (age 26) | (Austria) TSV Hartberg | 27 June 2024 | Free Transfer | 30 June 2026 |
| 21 | Isaac Price | CM | (Northern Ireland) | (England) Pontefract | 26 September 2003 (age 23) | Standard Liege | 22 January 2025 | Undisclosed | 30 June 2029 |
| 27 | Alex Mowatt | CM | (England) | Doncaster | 13 February 1995 (age 31) | Barnsley | 2 July 2021 | Free Transfer | 30 June 2026 |
Forwards
| 7 | Jed Wallace | RW | (England) | Reading | 26 March 1994 (age 32) | Millwall | 1 July 2022 | Free Transfer | 30 June 2026 |
| 9 | Josh Maja | ST | (Nigeria) | (England) Lewisham | 27 December 1998 (age 27) | (France) Bordeaux | 1 August 2023 | Free Transfer | 30 June 2026 |
| 11 | Grady Diangana | LW | (Democratic Republic of the Congo) | Lubumbashi | 19 April 1998 (age 28) | West Ham United | 4 September 2020 | £13,500,000 | 30 June 2025 |
| 12 | Daryl Dike | ST | (United States) | Edmond | 3 June 2000 (age 26) | (United States) Orlando City | 1 January 2022 | £8,630,000 | 30 June 2026 |
| 18 | Karlan Grant | CF | (England) | Thamesmead | 18 September 1997 (age 29) | Huddersfield Town | 15 October 2020 | £16,500,000 | 30 June 2026 |
| 19 | Will Lankshear | ST | (England) | Welwyn Garden City | 20 April 2005 (age 21) | Tottenham Hotspur | 31 January 2025 | Loan | 30 June 2025 |
| 22 | Mikey Johnston | LW | (Republic of Ireland) | (Scotland) Glasgow | 19 April 1999 (age 27) | (Scotland) Celtic | 30 August 2024 | £3,000,000 | 30 June 2028 |
| 26 | Tammer Bany | CF | (Jordan) | Denmark | 19 October 2003 (age 23) | Randers | 3 February 2025 | Undisclosed | 30 June 2028 |
| 31 | Tom Fellows | RW | (England) | Solihull | 25 July 2003 (age 23) | Academy | 1 July 2021 | —N/a | 30 June 2027 |
| 32 | Adam Armstrong | ST | (England) | Newcastle upon Tyne | 20 April 2005 (age 21) | Southampton | 4 February 2025 | Loan | 30 June 2025 |
| 44 | Devante Cole | ST | (England) | Alderley Edge | 10 May 1995 (age 31) | Barnsley | 31 July 2024 | Free Transfer | 30 June 2026 |
Out on Loan
| 15 | Caleb Taylor | CB | (England) | Burnley | 14 January 2003 (age 23) | Academy | 6 July 2019 | —N/a | 30 June 2028 |

== Statistics ==
=== Appearances and goals ===
As of 3 May 2025

Players with no appearances are not included on the list
Italics indicate a loaned in player

| No. | Pos | Nat | Player | Total | | Championship | | FA Cup | | EFL Cup | |
| No. | Pos | Nat | Player | Apps | Goals | Apps | Goals | Apps | Goals | Apps | Goals |
|---|---|---|---|---|---|---|---|---|---|---|---|
| 2 | DF | (England) ENG | Darnell Furlong | 43 | 1 | 42+0 | 1 | 1+0 | 0 | 0+0 | 0 |
| 3 | DF | (Jamaica) JAM | Mason Holgate | 27 | 1 | 21+5 | 1 | 1+0 | 0 | 0+0 | 0 |
| 4 | MF | (Hungary) HUN | Callum Styles | 35 | 3 | 29+5 | 3 | 1+0 | 0 | 0+0 | 0 |
| 5 | DF | (England) ENG | Kyle Bartley | 31 | 0 | 30+1 | 0 | 0+0 | 0 | 0+0 | 0 |
| 6 | DF | (Nigeria) NGR | Semi Ajayi | 15 | 0 | 14+1 | 0 | 0+0 | 0 | 0+0 | 0 |
| 7 | FW | (England) ENG | Jed Wallace | 30 | 1 | 6+23 | 1 | 0+1 | 0 | 0+0 | 0 |
| 8 | MF | (Republic of Ireland) IRL | Jayson Molumby | 38 | 4 | 30+7 | 4 | 0+1 | 0 | 0+0 | 0 |
| 9 | FW | (Nigeria) NGR | Josh Maja | 26 | 12 | 26+0 | 12 | 0+0 | 0 | 0+0 | 0 |
| 10 | MF | (England) ENG | John Swift | 37 | 3 | 18+18 | 3 | 1+0 | 0 | 0+0 | 0 |
| 11 | FW | (Democratic Republic of the Congo) COD | Grady Diangana | 35 | 4 | 14+20 | 4 | 1+0 | 0 | 0+0 | 0 |
| 12 | FW | (United States) USA | Daryl Dike | 11 | 1 | 1+10 | 1 | 0+0 | 0 | 0+0 | 0 |
| 14 | DF | (Norway) NOR | Torbjørn Heggem | 45 | 1 | 45+0 | 1 | 0+0 | 0 | 0+0 | 0 |
| 15 | DF | (England) ENG | Caleb Taylor | 2 | 1 | 0+0 | 0 | 1+0 | 1 | 1+0 | 0 |
| 17 | MF | (Mali) MLI | Ousmane Diakité | 25 | 0 | 9+14 | 0 | 0+1 | 0 | 1+0 | 0 |
| 18 | FW | (England) ENG | Karlan Grant | 44 | 7 | 34+9 | 7 | 1+0 | 0 | 0+0 | 0 |
| 19 | FW | (England) ENG | Will Lankshear | 11 | 0 | 4+7 | 0 | 0+0 | 0 | 0+0 | 0 |
| 20 | GK | (England) ENG | Josh Griffiths | 6 | 0 | 6+0 | 0 | 0+0 | 0 | 0+0 | 0 |
| 21 | MF | (Northern Ireland) NIR | Isaac Price | 15 | 1 | 13+2 | 1 | 0+0 | 0 | 0+0 | 0 |
| 22 | FW | (Republic of Ireland) IRL | Mikey Johnston | 41 | 3 | 25+15 | 3 | 0+1 | 0 | 0+0 | 0 |
| 23 | GK | (England) ENG | Joe Wildsmith | 12 | 0 | 10+0 | 0 | 1+0 | 0 | 1+0 | 0 |
| 24 | DF | (Italy) ITA | Gianluca Frabotta | 7 | 0 | 0+6 | 0 | 0+0 | 0 | 1+0 | 0 |
| 26 | FW | (Denmark) DEN | Tammer Bany | 4 | 0 | 0+4 | 0 | 0+0 | 0 | 0+0 | 0 |
| 27 | MF | (England) ENG | Alex Mowatt | 45 | 7 | 40+4 | 7 | 1+0 | 0 | 0+0 | 0 |
| 31 | FW | (England) ENG | Tom Fellows | 46 | 4 | 35+10 | 4 | 1+0 | 0 | 0+0 | 0 |
| 32 | FW | (England) ENG | Adam Armstrong | 16 | 3 | 12+4 | 3 | 0+0 | 0 | 0+0 | 0 |
| 34 | MF | (England) ENG | Harry Whitwell | 2 | 0 | 0+1 | 0 | 0+0 | 0 | 1+0 | 0 |
| 44 | FW | (England) ENG | Devante Cole | 16 | 0 | 0+14 | 0 | 0+1 | 0 | 1+0 | 0 |
Players who featured whilst on loan but returned to parent club during the season:
| 19 | FW | (England) ENG | Lewis Dobbin | 18 | 0 | 1+16 | 0 | 0+0 | 0 | 1+0 | 0 |
| 20 | MF | (Serbia) SRB | Uroš Račić | 21 | 0 | 9+11 | 0 | 1+0 | 0 | 0+0 | 0 |
| 21 | DF | (Northern Ireland) NIR | Paddy McNair | 3 | 0 | 2+0 | 0 | 0+0 | 0 | 1+0 | 0 |
Players who featured but departed permanently during the season:
| 1 | GK | (England) ENG | Alex Palmer | 30 | 0 | 30+0 | 0 | 0+0 | 0 | 0+0 | 0 |
| 32 | FW | (The Gambia) GAM | Modou Faal | 1 | 1 | 0+0 | 0 | 0+0 | 0 | 1+0 | 1 |

== Transfers ==
=== In ===
| Date | Pos | Player | From | Fee | Ref |
|---|---|---|---|---|---|
| 27 June 2024 | DM | (Mali) Ousmane Diakité | (Austria) TSV Hartberg | Free | |
| 27 June 2024 | CB | (Norway) Torbjørn Heggem | (Sweden) IF Brommapojkarna | £500,000 | |
| 10 July 2024 | GK | (England) Joe Wildsmith | (England) Derby County | Free | |
| 31 July 2024 | CF | (England) Devante Cole | (England) Barnsley | Free | |
| 6 August 2024 | LB | (Italy) Gianluca Frabotta | (Italy) Juventus | Undisclosed | |
| 24 August 2024 | CM | (Hungary) Callum Styles | (England) Barnsley | Undisclosed | |
| 30 August 2024 | LW | (Republic of Ireland) Mikey Johnston | (Scotland) Celtic | £3,000,000 | |
| 23 January 2025 | CM | (Northern Ireland) Isaac Price | (Belgium) Standard Liège | Undisclosed | |
| 3 February 2025 | CF | (Denmark) Tammer Bany | (Denmark) Randers | Undisclosed | |

=== Out ===
| Date | Pos. | Player | To | Fee | Ref. |
|---|---|---|---|---|---|
| 27 June 2024 | LB | (Wales) Zac Ashworth | (England) Blackpool | Undisclosed | |
| 31 July 2024 | DM | (Turkey) Okay Yokuşlu | (Turkey) Trabzonspor | Undisclosed | |
| 1 August 2024 | CF | (Ghana) Brandon Thomas-Asante | (England) Coventry City | Undisclosed | |
| 1 August 2024 | LB | (England) Conor Townsend | (England) Ipswich Town | Undisclosed | |
| 30 August 2024 | CF | (The Gambia) Modou Faal | (Wales) Wrexham | Undisclosed | |
| 3 February 2025 | GK | (England) Alex Palmer | (England) Ipswich Town | Undisclosed | |

=== Loaned in ===
| Date | Pos | Player | From | Date until | Ref |
|---|---|---|---|---|---|
| 25 July 2024 | CB | (Northern Ireland) Paddy McNair | (United States) San Diego FC | 31 December 2024 | |
| 6 August 2024 | LW | (England) Lewis Dobbin | (England) Aston Villa | 2 January 2025 (Note: On 2 January, Dobbin was recalled to Aston Villa) | |
| 22 August 2024 | DM | (Serbia) Uroš Račić | (Italy) Sassuolo | 1 February 2025 (Note: On 1 February, Račić was recalled to Sassuolo) | |
| 30 August 2024 | RB | (Jamaica) Mason Holgate | (England) Everton | End of Season | |
| 31 January 2025 | CF | (England) Will Lankshear | (England) Tottenham Hotspur | End of Season | |
| 4 February 2025 | CF | (England) Adam Armstrong | (England) Southampton | End of Season | |

=== Loaned out ===
| Date | Pos. | Player | To | Date until | Ref. |
|---|---|---|---|---|---|
| 10 July 2024 | GK | (England) Josh Griffiths | (England) Bristol Rovers | 3 February 2025 (Note: On 3 February, Griffiths was recalled from his loan at Bristol Rovers) | |
| 20 August 2024 | CF | (England) Reyes Cleary | (England) Walsall | 7 January 2025 (Note: On 7 January, Cleary was recalled from his loan at Walsall) | |
| 30 August 2024 | CB | (England) Caleb Taylor | (England) Wycombe Wanderers | 2 January 2025 (Note: On 2 January, Taylor was recalled from his loan at Wycombe) | |
| 5 September 2024 | GK | (Wales) Ronnie Hollingshead | (England) Alvechurch | End of Season (Note: On 7 January, Hollingshead's loan at Alvechurch was extended until the end of season) | |
| 18 September 2024 | RB | (Wales) Alex Williams | (England) Stratford Town | 16 October 2024 | |
| 19 September 2024 | DM | (Austria) Souleyman Mandey | (England) Stourbridge | 17 October 2024 | |
| 23 October 2024 | DM | (England) Matt Richards | (England) Alvechurch | 15 February 2025 (Note: On 7 January, Richards' loan at Alvechurch was extended until the end of season, However, on February 15 he left Alvechurch to join Leamington on loan) | |
| 30 October 2024 | AM | (England) Fenton Heard | (England) Rushall Olympic | 27 November 2024 | |
| 24 January 2025 | CF | (England) Reyes Cleary | (England) Hartlepool United | End of Season | |
| 29 January 2025 | CB | (England) Caleb Taylor | (England) Wycombe Wanderers | End of Season | |
| 11 February 2025 | LB | (England) Josh Shaw | (England) Marine | 11 March 2025 | |
| 15 February 2025 | DM | (England) Matt Richards | (England) Leamington | End of Season | |
| 18 March 2025 | GK | (England) Ben Cisse | (England) Alvechurch | 15 April 2025 | |
| 28 March 2025 | RW | (England) Archie Kirton | (England) Stourbridge | End of Season | |
| 29 March 2025 | GK | (England) Ted Cann | (England) Forest Green Rovers | End of Season | |

=== Released / Out of Contract ===
| Date | Pos. | Player | Subsequent club | Join date | Ref. |
|---|---|---|---|---|---|
| 30 June 2024 | CB | (England) Jenson Sumnall | (England) Peterborough United | 1 July 2024 | |
| 30 June 2024 | DM | (England) Nathaniel Chalobah | (England) Sheffield Wednesday | 13 July 2024 | |
| 30 June 2024 | CB | (Ivory Coast) Cédric Kipré | (France) Reims | 24 July 2024 | |
| 30 June 2024 | CM | (England) Jamie Andrews | (England) Woking | 26 July 2024 | |
| 30 June 2024 | CB | (England) Aaron Harper-Bailey | (Republic of Ireland) Drogheda United | 29 July 2024 | |
| 30 June 2024 | RW | (Scotland) Matt Phillips | (England) Oxford United | 1 August 2024 | |
| 30 June 2024 | DM | (France) Yann M'Vila | (France) Caen | 6 August 2024 | |
| 30 June 2024 | CF | (England) Jovan Malcolm | (England) Gateshead | 21 September 2024 | |
| 30 June 2024 | CF | (England) Ruben Shakpoke | (England) Enfield Town | 15 November 2024 | |
| 30 June 2024 | GK | (England) Bradley Foster | (Wales) Wrexham | 7 December 2024 | |
| 30 June 2024 | CB | (Netherlands) Erik Pieters | (England) Luton Town | 19 December 2024 | |
| 30 June 2024 | LM | (England) Adam Reach | (England) Wycombe Wanderers | 3 February 2025 | |
| 30 June 2024 | RB | (England) Martin Kelly | | | |
| 30 June 2024 | CF | (Ivory Coast) Cheick Kone | | | |
| 30 June 2024 | CB | (England) Narel Phillips | | | |
| 5 February 2025 | LW | (England) Adriel Walker | (England) Stoke City | 5 February 2025 | |

== Pre-season and friendlies ==
On May 24, West Brom announced their first pre-season friendly against Cambridge United. A second friendly was later added against Birmingham City. In June, four behind closed doors fixtures against Bolton Wanderers, Peterborough United, RCD Mallorca and Blackpool were also confirmed.

Win Draw Loss Fixtures

| 13 July 2024 Friendly | West Bromwich Albion | 1–2 | Bolton Wanderers | Burton upon Trent |
| 14:00 BST | Thomas-Asante 2' | Report | Dempsey 45'; Collins 90' | Stadium: St. George's Park; Attendance: 0 (behind closed doors) |

| 20 July 2024 Friendly | West Bromwich Albion | 2–1 | Peterborough United | Burton upon Trent |
| 13:00 BST | Thomas-Asante 42'; Crichlow 54' (o.g.) | Report | Odoh 48' | Stadium: St. George's Park; Attendance: 0 (behind closed doors) |

| 23 July 2024 Friendly | West Bromwich Albion | 1–2 | Blackpool | Walsall |
| 13:30 BST | Swift 52' | Report | Carey 2'; Fletcher 73' | Stadium: West Bromwich Albion Training Ground; Attendance: 0 (behind closed doors) |

| 27 July 2024 Friendly | West Bromwich Albion | 0–1 | RCD Mallorca | Walsall |
| 13:00 BST | | Report | Lopez 66' | Stadium: West Bromwich Albion Training Ground; Attendance: 0 (behind closed doors) |

| 2 August 2024 Friendly | Cambridge United | 1–0 | West Bromwich Albion | Cambridge |
| 19:45 BST | Lavery 12' (pen.) | Report | | Stadium: Abbey Stadium; Attendance: 3,203 (686 away); Referee: Neil Hair |

| 3 August 2024 Friendly | Birmingham City | 4–1 | West Bromwich Albion | Bordesley |
| 15:00 BST | May 20', 82'; Klarer 72'; Willumsson 76' | Report | Bartley 39' | Stadium: St Andrew's; Attendance: 8,284 (1,983 away); Referee: Rob Jones |

== Competitions ==
=== Summary ===
August
Albion began the season with a 1–3 victory away at Queens Park Rangers. The Hoops took the lead in the 16th minute through Lucas Andersen, but Josh Maja equalised ten minutes later. Maja grabbed two more in the second half to seal the win and become the first Albion player to score a hat-trick since Dwight Gayle in the 2018-19 season. A youthful Baggies side exited the EFL Cup just three days later, losing 2–1 at Fleetwood Town. Modou Faal gave Albion the lead, but the scoreline was turned around after goals from Ryan Graydon and Ronan Coughlan. The first home game of the season was against Leeds United. In a cagey game, neither side could find the back of the net and it ended goalless. Albion then won back to back away games, winning 1–2 at Stoke City. Karlan Grant put the Baggies in front inside 20 minutes after heading home a Tom Fellows cross. Lewis Koumas equalised for the hosts 10 minutes later, but Albion went back in front straight away through Josh Maja. No goals were scored in the second half as Albion made it 7 points from 3 games. The Baggies picked up their first home victory of the season the following Saturday with 1–0 win over Swansea. Albion dominated the majority of proceedings but the game was decided by a Jayson Molumby goal in first half stoppage time, as they climbed to 2nd into the table.

September
Albion continued their good form after the international break, winning 0–3 at Portsmouth to go top of the league. Josh Maja grabbed his fifth goal of the season inside the first minute, before Alex Mowatt's left-footed brace sealed the three points. They followed that up with another 1–0 home victory over Wayne Rooney's Plymouth Argyle. Josh Maja's second half strike was enough to see off the Pilgrims. The unbeaten start came to an end at Hillsborough, Albion fighting back from two goals down but ultimately falling to a 3–2 defeat. Sheffield Wednesday went 2–0 up in the first half through a Darnell Furlong own goal and Josh Windass's header. Maja and Mowatt each scored and looked to have salvaged the Baggies a point, but Anthony Musaba struck late to win the game for the Owls.

October
After their losing their unbeaten run, Albion lost again in midweek, 0–1 at home to Middlesbrough. There were few chances in the ninety minutes, but Hayden Hackney scored to steal the points for Boro late on. The Baggies were then unable to break down Millwall, as the lions held on for a 0–0 draw. Going into the international break, Albion were sat 4th in the table. Oxford United at the Kassam Stadium was first up after the break and Albion started brightly with Karlan Grant scoring in the 29th minute. They held on for the majority of the second half, but Dane Scarlett equalised for Oxford in stoppage time. The winless run was stretched to 5 games, as Albion drew 0–0 away at Blackburn Rovers in midweek. They failed to score again against in form Cardiff City with another goalless draw at The Hawthorns.

November
The Baggies did find the net at Kenilworth Road, as Josh Maja broke his goal drought with a brilliant backheel in first half stoppage time. However, Tahith Chong levelled for Luton in the second half and it finished 1–1. Albion then drew for the sixth successive time, drawing at home to Burnley 0–0. In the final game before the November international break they did return to winning ways, coming away from Hull City with a 1–2 victory. Karlan Grant and Josh Maja and both scored within 17 mins, before João Pedro pulled one back for the Tigers. Albion managed to hold on for their first win in 9, and also to go 7 games unbeaten. Albion returned with a blockbuster first half against Norwich City at the Hawthorns, with Holgate opening the scoring in the 11th minute. Norwich equalised through Emiliano Marcondes and went ahead via Albion defender Torbjorn Heggem, before Josh Maja hit back two minutes later. The second half unfortunately saw no goals and it ended 2–2. The Baggies then made the long trip to Sunderland in midweek, and returned with a point. It finished goalless again, which was Albion's eight draw in 9 matches. It was a familiar result away at Preston, Albion starting brightly and going ahead through Karlan Grant. However Emil Riis Jakobsen equalised for the hosts in the second half, and it once again finished level.

December
Top of the table Sheffield United were the next to visit the Hawthorns in stormy conditions, and played out an entertaining draw. Torbjorn Heggem headed the Baggies in front with his first goal, but two minutes of madness saw the Blades in front through Callum O'Hare and Tyrese Campbell. Tom Fellows's deflected strike in the second half brought the sides level and it finished as Albion's 10th draw in 11 games. In midweek a home win finally arrived, the first since September, against Frank Lampard's Sky Blues. Coventry had the greater share of possession but the Baggies were clinical, the goals coming from Alex Mowatt and Karlan Grant. Albion's twelve game unbeaten run came to an end at Vicarage Road, falling to a 2–1 defeat at Watford. Vakoun Bayo had scored twice to put the hosts 2–0 up, and although Jayson Molumby pulled one back, Albion lost for the first time since September. Mikey Johnston grabbed his first two goals of the season the following Sunday in a 2–0 victory over Bristol City. Johnston scored twice in the first half at the Hawthorns in the final game before Christmas. However, late on Christmas Eve it was announced that Carlos Corberan had left the club to join Valencia, with Chris Brunt taking over interim duty. Brunt's first game in charge was a trip to Pride Park to face Derby County, and it ended on the wrong end of a 2–1 scoreline. Jerry Yates put the hosts in front, and the Rams' lead was doubled after a Mason Holgate own goal. Grady Diangana came off the bench to score his first goal of the season but it turned out to be only a consolation. Albion responded really well by earning a hard-fought point at Sheffield United three days later. The home side took the lead against the run of play through Andre Brooks, before Karlan Grant fired home a deserved equaliser for the Baggies on the stroke of half time. The visitors battled in an even second 45, but the final game of the year ultimately finished level.

January
Albion began 2025 with a home game, against Preston North End, winning 3–1. Josh Maja broke his 8-game goal drought with a first half-brace and Callum Styles scored his first goal for the club, before Preston got one back in the second half through Ryan Ledson. Next up was a trip to South Wales to face Swansea City. Albion were the better side in an end-to-end affair, and took lead in the second half through Tom Fellows. However, in stoppage time, Joe Allen equalised for the Swans. The Baggies then had to travel to Premier League side Bournemouth for an FA Cup clash, and were comfortably beaten 5–1. Caleb Taylor scored early to give the visitors hope of an upset, but the Cherries scored five times through Justin Kluivert, Dango Ouattara (twice), Antoine Semenyo and Daniel Jebbison. On Friday 17 January, Tony Mowbray was announced as the new West Bromwich Albion manager, and watched from the stands as Albion drew 1–1 at home to Stoke City. Nathan Lowe struck early to put the Potters in front, and the hosts finally grabbed a deserved equaliser through Grady Diangana. Mowbray's first game in charge was a midweek trip to Middlesbrough, which ended in a 2–0 defeat. Hayden Hackney - who was the match winner in the reverse fixture back in October - gave Boro the lead before Ben Doak sealed the deal late on. However the Baggies bounced back in ruthless fashion against Portsmouth at the weekend. Alex Mowatt put the hosts in front, before Grady Diangana grabbed a first half brace either side of Wallace's first goal of the season. The second half was quieter although John Swift added a fifth, and deep in stoppage time Portsmouth netted a late consolation through Thomas Waddingham.

February
Alion's first game of February was away at bottom of the league Plymouth Argyle and lost in a poor showing. Jayson Molumby gave them the lead with 15 minutes to go, but just minutes later Plymouth won a controversial penalty, which Ryan Hardie converted. And late on, Hardie grabbed his second to give Argyle their first win since November. Back at the Hawthorns a week later, the Baggies were up against Sheffield Wednesday. After a goalless first half new siging Adam Armstrong put the hosts in front in the 74th minute after a cutback by Tom Fellows. Wednesday looked to have snatched a point in stoppage time through Callum Paterson, but Albion went up the other end just minutes later and Jayson Molumby won it right at the death. The Baggies then lost at home for the first time since October, to managerless Blackburn Rovers. The hosts had two goals disallowed, before Makhtar Gueye bagged a double to win the game for Rovers. Albion were then on their travels to face a Milllwall side who had drawn their last four games against the Baggies. And it ended in the most predictable result, Jake Cooper putting the lions in front before the visitors levelled via a Joe Bryan own goal, finishing in a 1–1 draw. The Baggies were back at home for the last time in February and came away with a 2–0 win over Oxford United. The hosts dominated proceedings and went ahead through Alex Mowatt just 11 minutes in, but it was not until the 11th minute of stoppage time that the points were sealed as John Swift tapped into an empty Oxford net.

March
Albion then faced one of the toughest away days of the season, top of the table Leeds United at Elland Road. However, the Baggies when toe to toe with Leeds throughout and despite going behind early on to a Junior Firpo header, deservedly equalised via Darnell Furlong and travelled home with a valuable point. They then followed that up with a resolute defensive display against QPR at the Hawthorns, having been down to ten men for the entire second half. Adam Armstrong opened the scoring from the penalty spot in the first half, but just before the interval Darnell Furlong was shown a red card for an alleged elbow. However, in the second half Albion battled brilliantly to secure a vital victory. Albion then faced a quick turnaround as they travelled to promotion chasing Burnley the following Tuesday. John Swift scored an expert free-kick after 20 minutes to give the visitors the lead, which was the first goal Burnley had conceded at Turf Moor since before Christmas. However the Clarets equalised after Zian Flemming pounced a mistake from Baggies keeper Joe Wildsmith. The Baggies' final game before the first international break of the year was at home to Hull City, and were disappointed to draw for the 18th time this season. Chances were scarce in the first half and the home side didn't break the deadlock until the 67th minute after Isaac Price volleyed home his first Albion goal, but ten minutes later the Tigers equalised through Abu Kamara and it finished 1–1. Following the international break, Albion lost for the first time in six games, away at Norwich. The visitors were the better team over ninety minutes without overly threatening, but Josh Sargent scored a stoppage time winner for the Canaries on the counterattack.

April
The bad run of form continued into April, as the Baggies lost at home for just the third time all season. They were the dominant team against Sunderland for 90 minutes, but were beaten by an expert Trai Hume free-kick. Next up in midweek was a huge clash away at play-off rivals Bristol City. After a goalless first half, Nahki Wells put the Robins in front but Alex Mowatt equalised not long after. Albion pushed and pushed in the final twenty minutes, but Jayson Molumby was shown red before Haydon Roberts won it right at the death as it became three defeats in a row for the Baggies. Albion needed to bounce back, and they did just that back at the Hawthorns against Watford. Tom Fellows grabbed two assists, setting up Karlan Grant and Mikey Johnston for their first goals of 2025 each. Moussa Sissoko pulled back for the Hornets but Albion held on for a 2–1 win. The Baggies went into the Easter period with two must win games and lost both of them. They fell to a 2–0 defeat at Coventry City on Good Friday with a lacklustre performance, Jack Rudoni and Matt Grimes scoring for the Sky Blues as well as Callum Styles receiving two yellow cards and being sent off. And then on Easter Monday - at home to Derby County - Albion lost again. Adams and Jerry Yates scored each from a corner in the first 30 minutes to put the visitors two goals up. Armstrong pulled one back with twenty minutes to go, but Nathaniel Mendez-Laing went up the other end and sealed the win late on. Following the defeat, the board decided to part ways with manager Tony Mowbray after just three months in charge. James Morrison took over the role on interim basis and watched Albion play out a 0–0 draw at Cardiff City. It was an entertaining game with plenty of chances however it finished goalless, a result that ruled out a top-six finish for the Baggies and sent Cardiff down to League One.

May
Albion's final game of the season was an entertaining 5–3 victory at home to Luton Town, which confirmed the Hatters would be relegated for the second successive season. Tom Fellows opened the scoring but Luton immediately hit back through Millenic Alli. Daryl Dike, in his first league start since April 2023, scored his first goal since March of that year, before Fellows grabbed his second after a brilliant team move. Callum Styles scored twice in the second half to make it 5–1, Jordan Clark and Millenic Alli pulled goals back but it was too late as the Baggies won and Luton were relegated again.

=== Championship ===
==== League table ====
| Pos | Team | Pld | W | D | L | GF | GA | GD | Pts |
|---|---|---|---|---|---|---|---|---|---|
| 7 | Blackburn Rovers | 46 | 19 | 9 | 18 | 53 | 48 | +5 | 66 |
| 8 | Millwall | 46 | 18 | 12 | 16 | 47 | 49 | −2 | 66 |
| 9 | West Bromwich Albion | 46 | 15 | 19 | 12 | 57 | 47 | +10 | 64 |
| 10 | Middlesbrough | 46 | 18 | 10 | 18 | 64 | 56 | +8 | 64 |
| 11 | Swansea City | 46 | 17 | 10 | 19 | 51 | 56 | −5 | 61 |

Source: English Football League
Rules for classification: 1) Points; 2) Goal difference; 3) Number of goals scored; 4) Head-to-head results; 5) Wins; 6) Away goals; 7) Penalty points (sec 9.5); 8) Number of 12-point sending off offences; 9) Play-off (only if needed to determine promotion/relegation)

==== Results summary ====
| Overall | | | | | | | | Home | | | | | | Away | | | | | |
| Pld | W | D | L | GF | GA | GD | Pts | W | D | L | GF | GA | GD | W | D | L | GF | GA | GD |
|---|---|---|---|---|---|---|---|---|---|---|---|---|---|---|---|---|---|---|---|
| 46 | 15 | 19 | 12 | 57 | 47 | +10 | 64 | 11 | 8 | 4 | 33 | 20 | +13 | 4 | 11 | 8 | 24 | 27 | −3 |

Last updated: 3 May 2025.
Source: Soccerway

==== Results by round ====
| Round | 1 | 2 | 3 | 4 | 5 | 6 | 7 | 8 | 9 | 10 | 11 | 12 | 13 | 14 | 15 | 16 | 17 | 18 | 19 | 20 | 21 | 22 | 23 | 24 | 25 | 26 | 27 | 28 | 29 | 30 | 31 | 32 | 33 | 34 | 35 | 36 | 37 | 38 | 39 | 40 | 41 | 42 | 43 | 44 | 45 | 46 |
|---|---|---|---|---|---|---|---|---|---|---|---|---|---|---|---|---|---|---|---|---|---|---|---|---|---|---|---|---|---|---|---|---|---|---|---|---|---|---|---|---|---|---|---|---|---|---|
| Ground | A | H | A | H | A | H | A | H | H | A | A | H | A | H | A | H | A | A | H | H | A | H | A | A | H | A | H | A | H | A | H | H | A | H | A | H | A | H | A | H | A | H | A | H | A | H |
| Result | W | D | W | W | W | W | L | L | D | D | D | D | D | D | W | D | D | D | D | W | L | W | L | D | W | D | D | L | W | L | W | L | D | W | D | W | D | D | L | L | L | W | L | L | D | W |
| Position | 4 | 5 | 4 | 2 | 1 | 1 | 1 | 4 | 4 | 5 | 4 | 5 | 6 | 5 | 5 | 6 | 7 | 7 | 8 | 6 | 8 | 7 | 8 | 8 | 6 | 6 | 6 | 7 | 5 | 6 | 5 | 6 | 6 | 5 | 6 | 6 | 5 | 6 | 5 | 8 | 8 | 7 | 8 | 10 | 10 | 9 |
| Points | 3 | 4 | 7 | 10 | 13 | 16 | 16 | 16 | 17 | 18 | 19 | 20 | 21 | 22 | 25 | 26 | 27 | 28 | 29 | 32 | 32 | 35 | 35 | 36 | 39 | 40 | 41 | 41 | 44 | 44 | 47 | 47 | 48 | 51 | 52 | 55 | 56 | 57 | 57 | 57 | 57 | 60 | 60 | 60 | 61 | 64 |

Source: Soccerway
A = Away; H = Home; W = Win; D = Draw; L = Loss

==== Matches ====
Win Draw Loss Fixtures

| 10 August 2024 1 | Queens Park Rangers | 1–3 | West Bromwich Albion | Shepherd's Bush |
| 12:30 BST | Andersen 16'; Cook (yellow card) 90+3' | Report | Maja 26', 51', 65' | Stadium: Loftus Road; Attendance: 15,900 (1,760 away); Referee: David Webb |

| 17 August 2024 2 | West Bromwich Albion | 0–0 | Leeds United | West Bromwich |
| 12:30 BST | Swift (yellow card) 30'; Molumby (yellow card) 90+2' | Report | Bogle (yellow card) 22'; Firpo (yellow card) 42' | Stadium: The Hawthorns; Attendance: 25,329 (2,535 away); Referee: Sam Allison |
Note: Live on Sky Sports

| 24 August 2024 3 | Stoke City | 1–2 | West Bromwich Albion | Stoke-on-Trent |
| 15:00 BST | Koumas 29' (yellow card) 90'; Laurent (yellow card) 41' | Report | Grant 18'; Maja 31'; Molumby (yellow card) 45+2'; Furlong (yellow card) 90+3' | Stadium: Bet365 Stadium; Attendance: 24,371 (3,044 away); Referee: James Bell |

| 31 August 2024 4 | West Bromwich Albion | 1–0 | Swansea City | West Bromwich |
| 15:00 BST | Molumby (yellow card) 10' (goal) 45+1'; Ajayi (yellow card) 20'; Heggem (yellow card) 36' | Report | Tymon (yellow card) 87' | Stadium: The Hawthorns; Attendance: 24,975 (1,787 away); Referee: Anthony Backhouse |

| 15 September 2024 5 | Portsmouth | 0–3 | West Bromwich Albion | Portsmouth |
| 15:00 BST | Saydee (yellow card) 9'; Norris (yellow card) 28'; Murphy (yellow card) 35'; Ogilvie (yellow card) 85'; Pack (yellow card) 90+1' | Report | Maja 1'; Ajayi (yellow card) 43'; Mowatt 51', 90+2'; Fellows (yellow card) 63' | Stadium: Fratton Park; Attendance: 20,205 (2,159 away); Referee: Leigh Doughty |
Note: Live on Sky Sports

| 21 September 2024 6 | West Bromwich Albion | 1–0 | Plymouth Argyle | West Bromwich |
| 15:00 BST | Mowatt (yellow card) 56'; Maja 62'; Wallace (yellow card) 72'; Heggem (yellow card) 90+2' | Report | Edwards (yellow card) 55'; Szucs (yellow card) 68' | Stadium: The Hawthorns; Attendance: 25,574 (2,120 away); Referee: Andrew Kitchen |

| 28 September 2024 7 | Sheffield Wednesday | 3–2 | West Bromwich Albion | Sheffield |
| 12:30 BST | Furlong 9' (o.g.); Windass 23' (yellow card) 27'; Valery (yellow card) 38'; Famewo (yellow card) 57'; Smith (yellow card) 72'; Musaba 86'; Beadle (yellow card) 90+1' | Report | Račić (yellow card) 59'; Maja 65'; Swift (yellow card) 70'; Diangana (yellow card) 77'; Mowatt 84' | Stadium: Hillsborough Stadium; Attendance: 26,308 (2,431 away); Referee: Ben Toner |
Note: Live on Sky Sports+

| 1 October 2024 8 | West Bromwich Albion | 0–1 | Middlesbrough | West Bromwich |
| 20:00 BST | Mowatt (yellow card) 34'; Račić (yellow card) 59' | Report | Hackney 73'; Jones (yellow card) 90+6' | Stadium: The Hawthorns; Attendance: 23,769 (1,076 away); Referee: David Webb |
Note: Live on Sky Sports

| 5 October 2024 9 | West Bromwich Albion | 0–0 | Millwall | West Bromwich |
| 15:00 BST | Ajayi (yellow card) 20' | Report | Honeyman (yellow card) 70'; Ivanović (yellow card) 71'; Leonard (yellow card) 75' | Stadium: The Hawthorns; Attendance: 24,158 (1,255); Referee: Will Finnie |

| 19 October 2024 10 | Oxford United | 1–1 | West Bromwich Albion | Oxford |
| 12:30 BST | Nelson (yellow card) 63'; Sibley (yellow card) 75'; Scarlett 90+2'; Ebiowei (yellow card) 90+4' | Report | Grant 29'; Mowatt (yellow card) 66' | Stadium: Kassam Stadium; Attendance: 11,453 (1,476 away); Referee: Leigh Doughty |
Note: Live on Sky Sports+

| 23 October 2024 11 | Blackburn Rovers | 0–0 | West Bromwich Albion | Blackburn |
| 19:45 BST | Tronstad (yellow card) 67'; Cantwell (yellow card) 71' | Report | | Stadium: Ewood Park; Attendance: 13,647 (1,362 away); Referee: John Busby |

| 26 October 2024 12 | West Bromwich Albion | 0–0 | Cardiff City | West Bromwich |
| 15:00 BST | Maja (yellow card) 39'; Styles (yellow card) 52'; Furlong (yellow card) 89'; Grant (yellow card) 90+3' | Report | Ng (yellow card) 39'; Tanner (yellow card) 72'; Colwill (yellow card) 78' | Stadium: The Hawthorns; Attendance: 23,978 (2,150 away); Referee: Josh Smith |

| 1 November 2024 13 | Luton Town | 1–1 | West Bromwich Albion | Luton |
| 20:00 GMT | Chong 60'; Bell (yellow card) 90' | Report | Furlong (yellow card) 41'; Maja 45+4'; Styles (yellow card) 55' | Stadium: Kenilworth Road; Attendance: 11,665 (1,344 away); Referee: Dean Whitestone |
Note: Live on Sky Sports+

| 7 November 2024 14 | West Bromwich Albion | 0–0 | Burnley | West Bromwich Albion |
| 20:00 GMT | Maja (yellow card) 26'; Swift (yellow card) 57'; Molumby (yellow card) 89' | Report | Cullen (yellow card) 30'; Roberts (yellow card) 40'; Koleosho (yellow card) 77' | Stadium: The Hawthorns; Attendance: 23,443 (1,060 away); Referee: Tom Nield |
Note: Live on Sky Sports

| 10 November 2024 15 | Hull City | 1–2 | West Bromwich Albion | Kingston upon Hull |
| 13:00 GMT | Pedro 40'; Omur (yellow card) 63' | Report | Grant 12'; Maja 17'; Furlong (yellow card) 35'; Styles (yellow card) 56' | Stadium: MKM Stadium; Attendance: 20,538 (1,412 away); Referee: Andrew Kitchen |

| 23 November 2024 16 | West Bromwich Albion | 2–2 | Norwich City | West Bromwich |
| 15:00 GMT | Holgate 11'; Furlong (yellow card) 39'; Maja 43' | Report | Marcondes 20'; Heggem 41' (o.g.); Slimane (yellow card) 51'; Fisher (yellow card) 62' | Stadium: The Hawthorns; Attendance: Lewis Smith; Referee: 25,673 (2,512 away) |

| 26 November 2024 17 | Sunderland | 0–0 | West Bromwich Albion | Sunderland |
| 20:00 GMT | | Report | | Stadium: Stadium of Light; Attendance: 36,733 (651 away); Referee: Bobby Madley |
Note: Live on Sky Sports

| 30 November 2024 18 | Preston North End | 1–1 | West Bromwich Albion | Preston |
| 15:00 GMT | Jakobsen 55'; Whatmough (yellow card) 69' | Report | Grant 13' (yellow card) 54' | Stadium: Deepdale; Attendance: 16,124 (2,932 away); Referee: Thomas Bramall |

| 8 December 2024 19 | West Bromwich Albion | 2–2 | Sheffield United | West Bromwich |
| 15:00 GMT | Heggem 24' (yellow card) 81'; Fellows 62'; Johnston (yellow card) 66' | Report | Rak-Sakyi (yellow card) 32'; O'Hare 35'; Campbell 37'; Hamer (yellow card) 45'; Gilchrist (yellow card) 48'; Peck (yellow card) 88' | Stadium: The Hawthorns; Attendance: 24,930 (2,484 away); Referee: David Webb |
Note: Live on Sky Sports+

| 11 December 2024 20 | West Bromwich Albion | 2–0 | Coventry City | West Bromwich |
| 20:00 GMT | Mowatt 11'; Styles (yellow card) 22'; Grant 74' | Report | Thomas (yellow card) 20' | Stadium: The Hawthorns; Attendance: 24,859 (2,516 away); Referee: John Busby |
Note: Live on Sky Sports

| 15 December 2024 21 | Watford | 2–1 | West Bromwich Albion | Watford |
| 14:00 GMT | Sissoko (yellow card) 21'; Bayo 35', 50'; Louza (yellow card) 70' | Report | Molumby (yellow card) 53' (goal) 67'; Tom Fellows (yellow card) 81'; Swift (yellow card) 90+8' | Stadium: Vicarage Road; Attendance: 19,774 (2,104 away); Referee: Gavin Ward |

| 22 December 2024 22 | West Bromwich Albion | 2–0 | Bristol City | West Bromwich |
| 15:00 GMT | Molumby (yellow card) 19'; Johnston 34', 43'; Bartley (yellow card) 80' | Report | McNally (yellow card) 16'; Pring (yellow card) 28'; Knight (yellow card) 73' | Stadium: The Hawthorns; Attendance: 25,910 (2,530 away); Referee: Thomas Kirk |
Note: Live on Sky Sports

| 26 December 2024 23 | Derby County | 2–1 | West Bromwich Albion | Derby |
| 17:30 GMT | Yates 28'; Holgate 68' (o.g.); Adams (yellow card) 90+5' | Report | Fellows (yellow card) 40'; Diangana 81' | Stadium: Pride Park Stadium; Attendance: 31,267 (3,118 away); Referee: Jarred Gillett |
Note: Live on Sky Sports

| 29 December 2024 24 | Sheffield United | 1–1 | West Bromwich Albion | Sheffield |
| 12:30 GMT | Brooks 23' (yellow card) 69'; Hamer (yellow card) 40'; Davies (yellow card) 45+2' | Report | Grant 45+1'; Johnston (yellow card) 48'; Styles (yellow card) 86' | Stadium: Bramall Lane; Attendance: 29,123 (2,472 away); Referee: Stuart Attwell |
Note: Live on Sky Sports

| 1 January 2025 25 | West Bromwich Albion | 3–1 | Preston North End | West Bromwich |
| 15:00 GMT | Maja 18', 40'; Styles 35'; Bartley (yellow card) 90+6' | Report | Þórðarson (yellow card) 42'; McCann (yellow card) 56'; Ledson 70'; Whatmough (yellow card) 71'; Whiteman (yellow card) 89' | Stadium: The Hawthorns; Attendance: 24,320 (905 away); Referee: Bobby Madley |

| 4 January 2025 26 | Swansea City | 1–1 | West Bromwich Albion | Landore |
| 12:30 GMT | Darling (yellow card) 62'; Allen 90+2'; Peart-Harris (yellow card) 90+6' | Report | Diakité (yellow card) 1'; Styles (yellow card) 50'; Molumby (yellow card) 61'; Fellows 66'; Holgate (yellow card) 90+5' | Stadium: Swansea.com Stadium; Attendance: 14,729 (1,209 away); Referee: Sam Allison |
Note: Live on Sky Sports+

| 18 January 2025 27 | West Bromwich Albion | 1–1 | Stoke City | West Bromwich |
| 15:00 GMT | Styles (yellow card) 66'; Diangana 71'; Mowatt (yellow card) 85' | Report | Lowe 9' | Stadium: The Hawthorns; Attendance: 25,679 (2,502 away); Referee: James Linington |

| 21 January 2025 28 | Middlesbrough | 2–0 | West Bromwich Albion | Middlesbrough |
| 19:45 GMT | Hackney 29'; Fry (yellow card) 79'; Doak 83' | Report | | Stadium: Riverside Stadium; Attendance: 23,671 (463 away); Referee: Andrew Kitchen |

| 25 January 2025 29 | West Bromwich Albion | 5–1 | Portsmouth | West Bromwich |
| 15:00 GMT | Mowatt 25'; Diangana 32', 44'; Wallace 37'; Swift 56' | Report | Dozzell (yellow card) 60'; Ritchie (yellow card) 62'; Williams (yellow card) 78'; Waddingham 90+3' | Stadium: The Hawthorns; Attendance: 25,621 (2,492 away); Referee: Jarred Gillett |

| 1 February 2025 30 | Plymouth Argyle | 2–1 | West Bromwich Albion | Plymouth |
| 12:30 GMT | Hardie 77' (pen.), 88' | Report | Molumby 74'; Wallace (yellow card) 76' | Stadium: Home Park; Attendance: 16,870 (1,735 away); Referee: Dean Whitestone |
Note: Live on Sky Sports

| 8 February 2025 31 | West Bromwich Albion | 2–1 | Sheffield Wednesday | West Bromwich |
| 12:30 GMT | Armstrong 74'; Furlong (yellow card) 84'; Molumby 90+6' (yellow card) 90+7'; Bartley (red card) 90+9' | Report | Valentin (yellow card) 78'; Windass (yellow card) 81'; Paterson 90+3'; Ihiekwe (yellow card) 90+9' | Stadium: The Hawthorns; Attendance: 25,452 (2,515 away); Referee: Tom Nield |
Note: Live on Sky Sports+

| 12 February 2025 32 | West Bromwich Albion | 0–2 | Blackburn Rovers | West Bromwich |
| 20:00 GMT | | Report | Gueye 47', 63'; Dolan (yellow card) 85' | Stadium: The Hawthorns; Attendance: 23,305 (655 away); Referee: David Webb |

| 15 February 2025 33 | Millwall | 1–1 | West Bromwich Albion | Bermondsey |
| 15:00 GMT | Cooper 19'; Saville (yellow card) 90+2' | Report | Bryan 26' (o.g.); Dike (yellow card) 82'; Molumby (yellow card) 89' | Stadium: The Den; Attendance: 15,842 (2,016 away); Referee: James Bell |

| 22 February 2025 34 | West Bromwich Albion | 2–0 | Oxford United | West Bromwich Albion |
| 15:00 GMT | Mowatt 11' (yellow card) 45+1'; Styles (yellow card) 79'; Swift 90+11' | Report | Kioso (yellow card) 50'; Matos (yellow card) 58'; Brannagan (yellow card) 82' | Stadium: The Hawthorns; Attendance: 25,951 (2,525 away); Referee: Sam Allison |

| 1 March 2025 35 | Leeds United | 1–1 | West Bromwich Albion | Leeds |
| 12:30 GMT | Firpo 9' | Report | Furlong 39' | Stadium: Elland Road; Attendance: 36,705 (1,969 away); Referee: Farai Hallam |
Note: Live on Sky Sports

| 8 March 2025 36 | West Bromwich Albion | 1–0 | Queens Park Rangers | West Bromwich |
| 15:00 GMT | Molumby (yellow card) 33'; Armstrong 40' (pen.); Furlong (red card) 45+3'; Holagte (yellow card) 51'; Bartley (yellow card) 60'; Wildsmith (yellow card) 90+3' | Report | Cook (yellow card) 39'; Morrison (yellow card) 66'; Colback (yellow card) 70'; Lloyd (yellow card) 83' | Stadium: The Hawthorns; Attendance: Adam Herczeg; Referee: 25,310 (1,911 away) |

| 11 March 2025 37 | Burnley | 1–1 | West Bromwich Albion | Burnley |
| 19:45 GMT | Flemming 23'; Egan-Riley (red card) 90+8' | Report | Swift 20'; Price (yellow card) 38'; Lankshear (yellow card) 90+8' | Stadium: Turf Moor; Attendance: 18,843 (1,249 away); Referee: Gavin Ward |

| 15 March 2025 38 | West Bromwich Albion | 1–1 | Hull City | West Bromwich |
| 15:00 GMT | Price 67'; Bartley (yellow card) 81' | Report | Hughes (yellow card) 27'; Slater (yellow card) 36'; Palmer (yellow card) 73'; Gelhardt (yellow card) 74'; Kamara 79'; Jones (yellow card) 89' | Stadium: The Hawthorns; Attendance: 24,870 (1,326 away); Referee: Jeremy Simpson |

| 29 March 2025 39 | Norwich City | 1–0 | West Bromwich Albion | Norwich |
| 15:00 GMT | Sargent 90+2' (yellow card) 90+3' | Report | | Stadium: Carrow Road; Attendance: 26,707 (2,022 away); Referee: David Webb |

| 5 April 2025 40 | West Bromwich Albion | 0–1 | Sunderland | West Bromwich |
| 12:30 BST | Molumby (yellow card) 65'; Styles (yellow card) 88' | Report | Hume 35'; Browne (yellow card) 59'; Roberts (yellow card) 60'; Mayenda (yellow card) 62' | Stadium: The Hawthorns; Attendance: 25,918 (2,522 away); Referee: Tom Nield |
Note: Live on Sky Sports+

| 8 April 2025 41 | Bristol City | 2–1 | West Bromwich Albion | Bristol |
| 19:45 BST | Wells 56'; Pring (yellow card) 81'; Roberts 90+6'; Williams (yellow card) 90+6' | Report | Mowatt 62'; Molumby (red card) 89'; Bany (yellow card) 90+1' | Stadium: Ashton Gate; Attendance: 24,734 (2,464 away); Referee: Matt Donohue |

| 12 April 2025 42 | West Bromwich Albion | 2–1 | Watford | West Bromwich |
| 15:00 BST | Grant 11'; Lankshear (yellow card) 41'; Furlong (yellow card) 45+1'; Johnston 60'; Price (yellow card) 65'; Bartley (yellow card) 78' | Report | Pollock (yellow card) 41'; Louza (yellow card) 59'; Sissoko 74' | Stadium: The Hawthorns; Attendance: 24,768 (1,491 away); Referee: Bobby Madley |

| 18 April 2025 43 | Coventry City | 2–0 | West Bromwich Albion | Coventry |
| 15:00 BST | Rudoni 6'; Grimes (yellow card) 11', (goal) 48'; Dasilva (yellow card) 43'; Kitching (yellow card) 53' | Report | Styles (yellow card) 28' (yellow-red card) 51' | Stadium: Coventry Building Society Arena; Attendance: 31,167 (2,996 away); Referee: Craig Pawson |

| 21 April 2025 44 | West Bromwich Albion | 1–3 | Derby County | West Bromwich |
| 15:00 BST | Fellows (yellow card) 53'; Armstrong 70' | Report | Adams 7'; Harness (yellow card) 10'; Yates 30'; Mendez-Laing 87'; Phillips (yellow card) 90+4' | Stadium: The Hawthorns; Attendance: 25,750 (2,457 away); Referee: Gavin Ward |

| 26 April 2025 45 | Cardiff City | 0–0 | West Bromwich Albion | Leckwith |
| 15:00 BST | Salech (yellow card) 33' | Report | | Stadium: Cardiff City Stadium; Attendance: 23,710 (3,219 away); Referee: Andrew Kitchen |

| 3 May 2025 46 | West Bromwich Albion | 5–3 | Luton Town | West Bromwich |
| 12:30 BST | Fellows 7', 33'; Dike 30'; Styles 57', 61'; Ajayi (yellow card) 73'; Furlong (yellow card) 90+5' | Report | Alli 9', 88'; Clark 65'; Aasgaard (yellow card) 72' | Stadium: The Hawthorns; Attendance: 25,615 (2,564 away); Referee: Darren Bond |
Note: Live on Sky Sports

=== FA Cup ===
West Brom entered the FA Cup at the third round stage, and were drawn away against Bournemouth.

Win Draw Loss Fixtures

| 11 January 2025 Third Round | Bournemouth | 5–1 | West Bromwich Albion | Bournemouth |
| 15:00 GMT | Kluivert 27'; Ouattara 34', 44'; Semenyo 47', (yellow card) 60'; Jebbison 90+2' | Report | Taylor 14', (yellow card) 45+1'; Holgate (yellow card) 18'; Furlong (yellow card) 61' | Stadium: Dean Court; Attendance: 10,916 (1,992 away); Referee: John Busby |

=== EFL Cup ===
On 27 June, the draw for the first round was made, with West Brom being drawn away against Fleetwood Town.

Win Draw Loss Fixtures

| 13 August 2024 First Round | Fleetwood Town | 2–1 | West Bromwich Albion | Fleetwood |
| 19:45 BST | Graydon 12'; Coughlan 33'; Mayor (yellow card) 72'; Broom (yellow card) 79' | Report | Faal 8'; Frabotta (yellow card) 51'; Nelson (yellow card) 85' | Stadium: Highbury Stadium; Attendance: 2,611 (872 away); Referee: Thomas Kirk |
Note: Live on Sky Sports+

== End of season awards ==
The winners of the 2024/25 end of season West Bromwich Albion awards were announced on 15 April 2025.

- Supporters' Player of the Season (Norway) Torbjørn Heggem
- Players’ Player of the Season (Norway) Torbjørn Heggem
- Top Goalscorer (Nigeria) Josh Maja 12 goals
- Goal of the Season (Nigeria) Josh Maja v Luton Town (Away)
- Young Player of the Season (England) Tom Fellows
