= Alexander (surname) =

- Language: English

Other names
- See also: MacAlasdair; Mac Alsandair

Alexander is a surname.

One origin is from the Greek Ἀλέξανδρος meaning 'defender of men'. In Scotland, Alexander is an Anglicised form of the Scottish Gaelic MacAlasdair. It is a somewhat common Scottish name, and the region of Scotland where it traditionally is most commonly found is the Highlands.

== Notable people ==
=== Architecture ===
- Cecil Alexander (1918–2013), American architect
- Charles A. Alexander (1827–1888), American architect
- Christopher Alexander (1936–2022), Austrian-American architect and design theorist

=== Arts and entertainment ===
- AJ Alexander (born 1980), American model and Playboy Playmate
- Ann Dunlop Alexander (1896–1969), Scottish artist
- Beatrice Alexander (1895–1990), American dollmaker and businesswoman
- Dorothy Alexander, professional name of Dorothy Bohm (1924–2023), naturalised British photographer
- Francesca Alexander (1837–1917), American illustrator, author, and translator
- J. Alexander (model) (born 1958), American model, runway coach and panelist on America's Next Top Model
- Jay Alexander (born 1968), American magician, comedian and entertainer
- Julia Alexander (1967–2025), American art historian and curator
- Lena Alexander (1899–1983), Scottish artist
- Lloyd Alexander (1924–2007), American author
- Miriam Alexander (born 1879), British author
- Mo Alexander (born 1970), American comedian
- Nykolai Aleksander (born 1978), German artist
- Sally Hobart Alexander (born 1943), American writer of children's literature
- Sue Alexander (writer) (1933–2008), American children's author
- Vanessa Aleksander (born 1996), Polish actress

==== Music and dance ====
- Arthur Alexander (1940–1993), American soul singer and songwriter
- Birdie Alexander (1870–1960), American musician and educator
- Cecil Frances Alexander (1818–1895), British hymn-writer and poet
- Dottie Alexander (born 1972), American keyboardist
- Graham Alexander (born 1986), American musician and singer-songwriter
- Kita Alexander (born 1996), Australian pop singer-songwriter
- Linsey Alexander (1942–2025), American blues songwriter, vocalist, and guitarist
- Margie Alexander (1948–2013), American singer
- Olly Alexander (born 1990), English musician, lead singer of Years & Years
- Ora Alexander (born c.1896–unknown), American classic female blues singer
- Roberta Alexander (1949–2025), American operatic soprano
- Shane Alexander (musician) (late 20th/early 21st c.), American singer-songwriter and musician
- Van Alexander (1915–2015), American bandleader, arranger and composer
- The Alexander Brothers, Scottish folk duo, Tom Alexander (1934–2020) and Jack Alexander (1935–2013)

==== Television and film ====
- Cris Alexander (1920–2012), American actor, singer, dancer, designer, and photographer
- Dari Alexander (born 1969), American news anchor
- F. Matthias Alexander (1869–1955), Australian actor/orator, founder of the Alexander Technique
- Jace Alexander (born 1964), American television director and actor
- Jane Alexander (born 1939), American actress and author
- Jean Alexander (1926–2016), British actress
- Jessica Alexander (born 1999), British actress
- Joan Alexander (1915–2009), American actress
- K Alexander (born 1992), Canadian actor
- Lucy Alexander (born 1970), British television presenter
- Ross Alexander (1907–1937), American actor
- Sarah Alexander (born 1971), British actress
- Shannon Alexander, Australian filmmaker
- Sofia Alexander, Mexican animator and voice actor

=== Law and politics ===
- A. V. Alexander, 1st Earl Alexander of Hillsborough (1885–1965), British politician
- Albert R. Alexander (1859–1966), American judge
- Archibald S. Alexander (1906–1979), American lawyer, civil servant, and Democratic politician
- Cecil L. Alexander (born 1935), American politician
- Danny Alexander (born 1972), British politician
- Douglas Alexander (born 1967), British politician
- Eduard Alexander (1881–1945), German politician
- Ethel Skyles Alexander (1925–2016), American politician
- Evan Shelby Alexander (1767–1809), American politician
- Julia McGehee Alexander (1876–1957), American politician and lawyer
- Lamar Alexander (born 1940), American politician
- Lawrence A. Alexander (born 1943), American law professor
- Lincoln Alexander (1922–2012), Canadian politician
- Louise Alexander (politician) (born 1960), American politician, member of the Alabama House of Representatives
- Mark Alexander (politician) (1792–1883), American politician
- Milton Otho Alexander (1923–2013), American politician
- Morris Alexander (1877–1946), South African politician

=== Military ===
- Barton S. Alexander (1819–1878), U.S. Army brigadier general and engineer during the American Civil War
- Bevin Alexander (born 1929), American military historian and author
- Boyd Alexander (1873–1910), British army officer, explorer and ornithologist
- Edward Porter Alexander (1835–1910), U.S. and Confederate States Army officer
- Milton Alexander (1796–1856), American militia officer, attorney, and politician
- Reginald Gordon Alexander (1917–1942), Australian private who was killed in the 1942 Dili massacre
- Thomas Alexander (1812–1860) Scottish military surgeon

=== Religion ===
- Archibald Alexander (1772–1851), American theologian, professor, and first principal of Princeton Seminary
- Caleb Alexander (1755–1828), American clergyman, writer, teacher
- Noël Alexandre (1639–1724), French theologian, author, and ecclesiastical historian

=== Science and medicine ===
- Annie Lowrie Alexander (1864–1929), American physician and educator
- Archibald Alexander (politician) (1755–1822), American physician and politician
- Archibald Alphonso Alexander (1888–1958), American design and construction engineer
- Archie Alexander (1888–1958), American engineer and architect
- Charles Paul Alexander (1889–1981), American entomologist
- Christopher James Alexander (1887–1917), British ornithologist
- Claudia Alexander (1959–2015), American planetary scientist
- Duane Alexander (1940–2020), American doctor
- Eben Alexander (author) (born 1953), American neurosurgeon
- Franz Alexander (1891–1964), Hungarian-American psychoanalyst and physician
- Horace Alexander (1889–1989), English writer, pacifist and ornithologist
- Howard Wright Alexander (1911–1985), Canadian-American mathematician
- Mary C. Alexander (1893–1955), American aviation pioneer
- Millard H. Alexander (born 1943), American theoretical chemist
- Patrick Young Alexander (1867–1943), British aviation pioneer
- Richard D. Alexander (1930–2018), American zoologist and professor
- Stephanie B. Alexander (1941–2023), American mathematician
- Wilfred Backhouse Alexander (1885–1965), English ornithologist and entomologist

=== Sports ===
- Adonis Alexander (born 1996), American football player
- Ana Alexander (athlete) (born 1954), Cuban long-jumper
- Blaise Alexander (1976–2001), American racing driver
- Blaze Alexander (born 1999), American baseball player
- Chuffie Alexander (1902–1989), American baseball player
- CJ Alexander (born 1996), American baseball player
- Cory Alexander (born 1973), American basketball player
- Courtney Alexander (born 1977), American basketball player
- Darius Alexander (born 2000), American football player
- Deuce Alexander (born 2005), American football player
- Devon Alexander (born 1987), American professional boxer
- Doc Alexander (1897–1975), American NFL football player and coach
- Frank Alexander (cricketer) (1911–2005), Australian cricketer
- Greg Alexander (born 1965), Australian rugby league player and commentator
- Grover Cleveland Alexander (1887–1950), American baseball player
- Gus Alexander (1934–2010), Scottish footballer
- Hubbard Alexander (1939–2016), American football player
- Jaire Alexander (born 1997), American football player
- Joe Alexander (born 1986), American-Israeli basketball player in the Israel Basketball Premier League
- Kyle Alexander (born 1996), Canadian basketball player for Hapoel Tel Aviv of the Israeli Basketball Premier League
- Mackenzie Alexander (born 2006), Canadian ice hockey player
- Manny Alexander (born 1971), Dominican Republic-born American baseball player
- Marte Alexander(born 1976), American-born Italian basketball player
- Neil Alexander (born 1978), Scottish footballer
- Odicci Alexander (born 1998), American softball player
- Posh Alexander (born 2001), American basketball player
- Rex Alexander (1924–1982), American college sports coach
- Scott Alexander (baseball) (born 1989), American baseball player
- Shane Alexander (volleyball) (born 1986), Australian volleyball player
- Shaun Alexander (born 1977), American football player
- Stan Alexander (1905–1961), English footballer
- Trey Alexander (basketball) (born 2003), American basketball player
- Tyler Alexander (born 1994), American baseball player
- Ty-Shon Alexander (born 1998), American basketball player
- Victor Alexander (born 1969), American basketball player
- Zy Alexander, American football player

=== Other professions ===
- Amir Alexander (born 1963), Israeli-American historian
- Betty Alexander (died 1952), Scottish formerly missing female child
- Conel Hugh O'Donel Alexander (1909–1974), British cryptanalyst, chess player, and chess writer
- Dan Dale Alexander (1919–1990), American pseudoscientific diet advocate
- Grace Alexander (1872–1951), American writer, journalist, teacher
- Holmes Alexander (1906–1985), American historian, journalist, and columnist
- Jane Grace Alexander (1848–1932), American banker
- Jeffrey C. Alexander (born 1947), American sociologist
- Juliet Alexander (born 1950s), Guyanese-born British journalist and TV presenter
- Michael J. Alexander (1941–2023), British translator, poet, academic and broadcaster
- Rachel Frances Alexander (1875–1964), British social campaigner
- Robin Alexander, British educationist and academic
- Robin Alexander (journalist) (born 1975), German journalist and author
- Samuel Alexander (1859–1938), Australian/British philosopher and essayist
- Shane Alexander, 2nd Earl Alexander of Tunis (born 1935), British peer
- Tammy Alexander (1963–1979), American formerly missing murder victim
- Travis Alexander, murder victim – see Murder of Travis Alexander

=== Disambiguation lists ===
- Donald Alexander (disambiguation), several people
- Fred Alexander (disambiguation), several people
- Gary Alexander (disambiguation), several people
- Harry Alexander (disambiguation), including Harold Alexander, several people
- James Alexander (disambiguation), several people
- Jason Alexander (disambiguation), several people
- John Alexander (disambiguation), several people
- Joseph Alexander (disambiguation), several people
- Peter Alexander (disambiguation), several people
- Robert Alexander (disambiguation), several people
- Thomas Alexander (disambiguation), several people
- William Alexander (disambiguation), several people

== See also ==
- Aleksander (Hasidic dynasty)
- J. Alexander (disambiguation)
- Alexander (disambiguation)
