= Alexander (disambiguation) =

Alexander is a male given name.

Alexander may also refer to:

== Arts and entertainment ==
=== Films ===
- Alexander the Great (1980 film), a film directed by Theo Angelopoulos
- Alexander (1996 film), a Tamil action film
- Alexander (2004 film), an epic about Alexander the Great directed by Oliver Stone
- Alexander (2008 film), a Russian historical film about Alexander Nevsky

=== Gaming ===
- Alexander (video game), a real-time strategy game
- Rome: Total War: Alexander, a PC game

=== Music ===
- Alexander (soundtrack), the Vangelis score of the 2004 film Alexander
- Alexander (Alex Ebert album), 2011
- "Alexander" (song), a 2013 song by Rey Pila
- "Alexander", a 1971 song by Jeannette van Zutphen

=== Plays ===
- Alexander (play), a lost tragedy by the Athenian playwright Euripides
- Alexander, a lost play by the Roman writer Ennius

=== Fictional characters ===
- Alexander, a Peppa Pig character

== Businesses ==
- Gebr. Alexander, a German manufacturer of musical instruments, founded in 1782
- Alexander Aircraft Company, an aircraft manufacturer in Colorado, U.S., in 1925
- Alexander Patent Racket Company, an Australian sports equipment manufacturer, founded in 1925
- Walter Alexander Coachbuilders, an bus and coach bodywork builder, founded in 1913

== People ==
- Alexander (surname), including a list of people with the surname

== Places ==
=== Australia ===
- Alexander River (Western Australia)
- Lake Alexander (Northern Territory), a man-made lake

=== Canada ===
- Alexander, Manitoba
- Rural Municipality of Alexander, Manitoba

=== United States ===
- Alexander City, Alabama, a city
- Alexander Archipelago, Alaska, a group of islands
- Alexander Creek, Alaska, also known as Alexander, an unincorporated community
  - Alexander Creek (Susitna River tributary), a stream
- Alexander, Arkansas, a city
- Alexander Valley AVA, California, an American Viticultural Area
- Alexander, Georgia, an unincorporated community
- Alexander County, Illinois
- Alexander, Iowa, a city
- Alexander, Kansas, a city
- Alexander, Maine, a town
- Alexander, New York, a town
  - Alexander (village), New York
- Alexander County, North Carolina
- Alexander, North Dakota, a city
- Alexander, West Virginia, an unincorporated community
- Alexander Archipelago, Alaska
- Lake Alexander (Alaska)
- Alexander Lake (southcentral Alaska)
- Lake Alexander (Minnesota)

=== Elsewhere ===
- Alexander (crater), on the Moon
- Alexander Church, a Neo-Gothic church in Tampere, Finland
- Alexander Island, Antarctica

== Plants ==
- Alexander (grape), a hybrid grape
- Isabella (grape), also called Alexander
- Smyrnium olusatrum, common name Alexanders, an edible cultivated flowering plant

== Ships ==
- HMS Alexander, eight ships of the Royal Navy
- Alexander (ship), other ships or sailing vessels

== Other uses ==
- Alexander (cocktail), an alcoholic drink made with Cognac
- Alexander Technique, a method of removing muscular tension
- Alexander disease, a very rare disease
- Alexander violin, a string instrument

== See also ==
- Zizia aurea, or golden alexanders, a flowering perennial forb of the carrot family
- Alexander's (disambiguation)
- Aleksander (Hasidic dynasty)
- Alexandre (disambiguation)
