= Alexander River =

Alexander River may refer to:

- Alexander River (Western Australia)
- Alexander River (New Zealand)

== See also ==
- Nahal Alexander, Israel
- Alexander Creek (Susitna River tributary), Alaska
- River Alexander, an American child actor
