= Francis Alexander =

Francis Alexander may refer to:

- Francis Alexander (painter) (1800–1881), American portrait painter
- Francis Alexander, Prince of Nassau-Hadamar (1674–1711)
- Francis Alexander (cricketer) (1911–2005)

== See also ==
- Frank Alexander (disambiguation)
- Frances Alexander (disambiguation)
