= Lake Alexander =

Lake Alexander or Alexander Lake may refer to:

- Lake Alexander (Northern Territory)
- Lake Alexander (Alaska)
- Alexander Lake (southcentral Alaska)
- Lake Alexander (Minnesota)
