= Henry Alexander =

Henry Alexander may refer to:

- Henry Alexander (painter) (1860–1894), American painter
- Henry Alexander (Irish politician) (1763–1818), member of the Parliament of Ireland 1788–1800, UK Parliament 1801–06
- Henry Alexander (1787–1861), MP for Barnstaple, 1826–30
- Henry P. Alexander (1801–1867), American politician
- Henry Templer Alexander (1911–1977), British general
- Henry Alexander (cricketer) (1841–1920), English cricketer
- Henry C. Alexander (1902–1969), American banker
- Henry Quincy Alexander (1863–1929), American politician

== See also ==
- Harry Alexander (disambiguation)
