= Jason Alexander (disambiguation) =

Jason Alexander (born 1959) is an American actor, comedian and voice actor.

Jason Alexander may also refer to:

- Jason Alexander (rugby union) (born 2000), South African rugby union player
- Jason Alexander (baseball) (born 1993), baseball player
- Jason Allen Alexander, ex-husband of Britney Spears
- Jason Shawn Alexander (born 1975), comic-book artist
- Jace Alexander (born 1964), born Jason Alexander, American television director and actor

== See also ==
- J. Alexander (disambiguation)
- Alexander (surname)
