= Frederick Alexander =

Frederick Alexander may refer to:

- F. Matthias Alexander (1869–1955), Australian actor, developer of Alexander Technique
- Piers Flint-Shipman (1962–1984), British actor, also known by the stage name Frederick Alexander
- Frederick Alexander (cricketer) (1924–1984), English cricketer
- Fred Alexander (1880–1969), American tennis player
- Fred Alexander (historian) (1899–1996), Australian historian
- Fred Alexander (rugby union) (1870–1937), South African rugby union player
- Fred Alexander (c. 1879–1901), African-American man lynched in the town of Leavenworth, Kansas, see Lynching of Fred Alexander
- Frederick D. Alexander (1910–1980), politician from North Carolina
- Fred Alexander (editor) (1882–1957), New Zealand subeditor, poetry anthologist and newspaper editor

== See also ==
- Frederic Augustus Alexander, Duke of Beaufort-Spontin (1751–1817)
