= Thomas Alexander =

Thomas or Tom Alexander may refer to:

- Thomas Alexander (military surgeon) (1812–1860), Scottish military surgeon, director general of the Army Medical Department
- Thomas C. Alexander (born 1956), American politician
- Thomas Cecil Alexander (1884–1968), founder of the Scouting movement in Malaysia
- Thomas G. Alexander (born 1935), American historian and academic
- Thomas A. Alexander (1800–1866), American politician
- Tom Alexander (actor) (born 1963), American writer, broadcaster, composer, and voice actor
- Tom Alexander (swimmer) (born 1958), Canadian swimmer.
- Tom Alexander (businessman) (born 1959), British businessman
- Tom Alexander (1934–2020), Scottish musician (The Alexander Brothers)
- Tommy Alexander (born 1989), Scottish field hockey player
