= Magidson =

Magidson is a surname. Notable people with the surname include:

- David Magidson (born 1963), American actor
- Herb Magidson (1906–1986), American popular lyricist
