= J. Alexander =

J. Alexander may refer to:

== People ==
- J. Alexander (comics artist) (born 1975), painter, illustrator and draftsman
- J. Alexander (model) (born 1958), American model, runway coach and panelist on America's Next Top Model
- J. Alexander (politician) (1938–2022), Indian politician
- J. D. Alexander (born 1959), American businessman politician
- J. D. Alexander (coach) (1899–1962), college football coach
- J. Neil Alexander (born 1954), Anglican liturgist and bishop in the Episcopal Church
- J. Alexander better known as Mahendran (filmmaker) (1939–2019), Indian filmmaker in Tamil cinema

== Other uses ==
- J. Alexander's, an American restaurant chain

== See also ==
- Jay Alexander (born 1968), American magician and comedian
- Alexander (surname), many people whose first names begin with "J" with Alexander as a surname
- Alexander (disambiguation)
