= Robinson River =

Robinson River may refer to

- Robinson River, Northern Territory, a settlement in Australia
- Robinson River (Northern Territory)
- Robinson River (New Zealand)
- Robinson River (Virginia), a river in the United States of America
- Robinson River (Western Australia)
