= Albert Alexander =

Albert Alexander may refer to:

- Albert Alexander (police officer) (1873–1941), first patient to be treated with injections of penicillin
- Albert Ernest Alexander (1914–1970), British-Australian chemist
- Albert R. Alexander (1859–1966), Canadian-born American judge
- Albert Alexander Sr. (1867–1953), figure in early 20th century English football
- A. V. Alexander, 1st Earl Alexander of Hillsborough (1885–1965), British politician
- Albert Alexander Colquhoun, Canadian politician
