= Bob Alexander (disambiguation) =

Bob Alexander (1922–1993) was a Major League Baseball pitcher.

Bob Alexander may also refer to:

- Bob Alexander (ring announcer) (born 1963), American professional ring announcer
- Bob Alexander, American candidate for Congress, see United States House of Representatives elections in Michigan, 2008
- Bob Alexander (ice hockey) in 1983–84 New York Rangers season
- Bob Alexander (runner) (1915–?), American miler, 1937 All-American for the Stanford Cardinal track and field team

== See also ==
- Robert Alexander (disambiguation)
