= Sex, Love, Misery: New New York =

2022 American documentary film

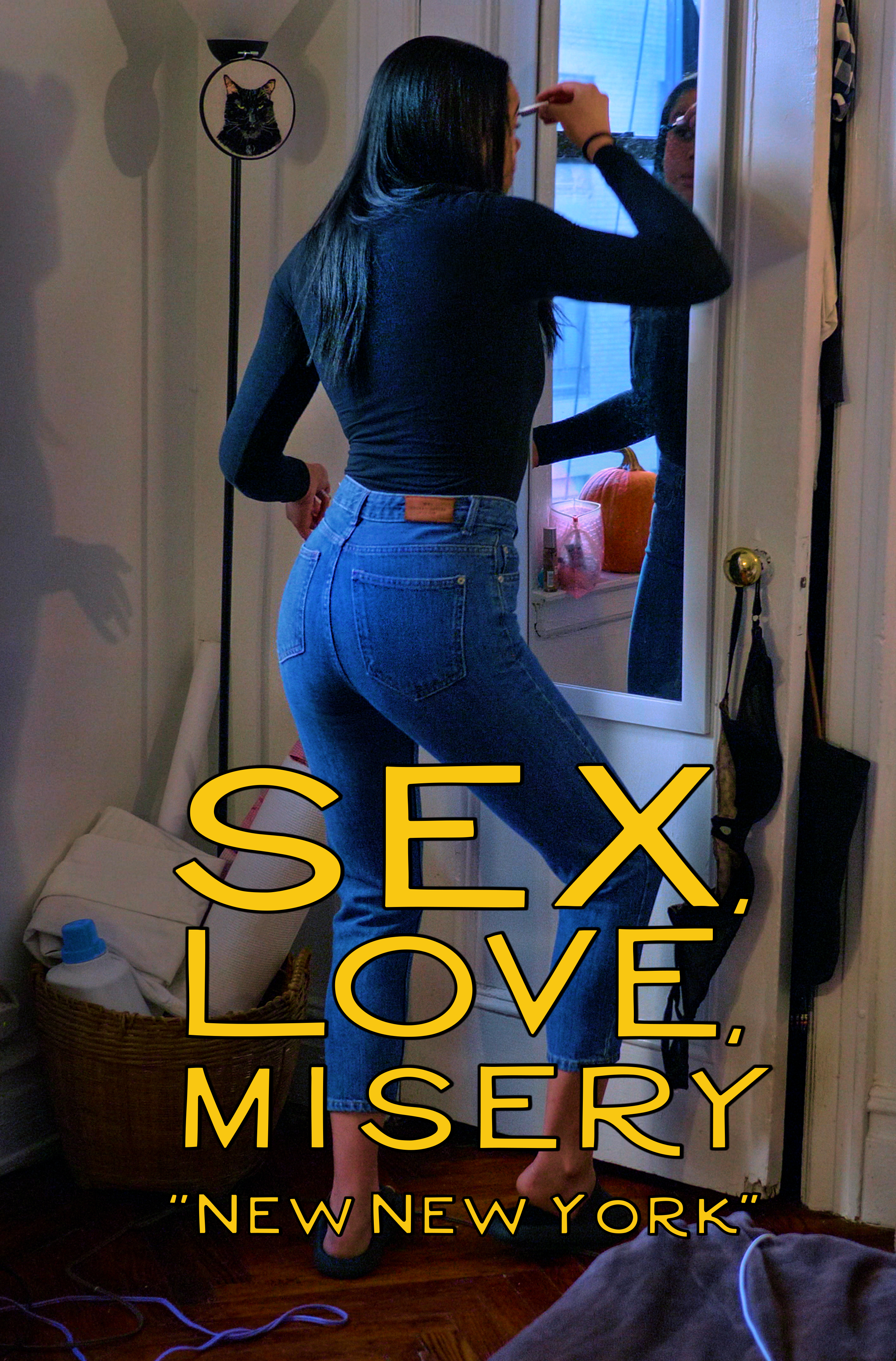
- Theatrical release poster
- Directed by: Shannon Alexander
- Produced by: Shannon Alexander
- Starring: Emile Filippi; Aisha Kerensa; Izzie Zuniga; Jack Terzi; Troy Weekes; Camila Anderson
- Production company: Early Autumn
- Release date: May 26, 2022
- Running time: 67 minutes
- Country: United States
- Language: English

Sex, Love, Misery: New New York is a 2022 American documentary film written and directed by Shannon Alexander. The film explores modern dating experiences in New York City during the COVID-19 pandemic. The director makes the choice not to show the dates, focussing instead on the build up to the date, and the participants reactions afterwards.
