= Frank Alexander =

Frank Alexander may refer to:

- Frank Alexander (actor) (1879–1937), American silent film comedian and actor
- Frank Alexander (cricketer) (1911–2005), Australian cricketer
- Frank A. Alexander (1937–2020), American Thoroughbred horse racing trainer
- Frank S. Alexander (born 1952), professor of law at the Emory University School of Law
- Frank Alexander (American football) (born 1989), American football player
- Frank Alexander (veterinarian) (1917–1998), British veterinarian
- Sir Frank Alexander, 1st Baronet (1881–1959), British shipowner and shipbroker

== See also ==
- Francis Alexander (disambiguation)
