= MacAlasdair =

Scottish Gaelic surname

- The Irish Mac Alastair in Gaelic script
- Gender: Masculine
- Language: Scottish Gaelic

Other gender
- Feminine: NicAlasdair

Origin
- Language: Scottish Gaelic
- Derivation: mac + Alasdair
- Meaning: "son" + "of Alasdair"

Other names
- Cognate: Mac Alasdair
- See also: Mac Alastair, Mac Alastruim, Mac Alsandair

MacAlasdair is a masculine surname in Scottish Gaelic. The name translates into English as "son of Alasdair". The feminine form of the name is NicAlasdair, which translates into English as "daughter of Alasdair". These surnames originated as a patronyms, however they no longer refer to the actual name of the bearer's father. There are numerous Anglicised forms of MacAlasdair.

The Irish form of MacAlasdair is Mac Alasdair. Other similar Irish surnames are Mac Alastair, Mac Alastruim and Mac Alsandair. The feminine forms of these surnames for unmarried females are Nic Alasdair, Nic Alastair, Nic Alastruim, and Nic Alsandair. The feminine forms for married females are Bean Mhic Alasdair, Bean Mhic Alastair, Bean Mhic Alastruim, and Bean Mhic Alsandair; these names can also be contracted to Mhic Alasdair, Mhic Alastair, Mhic Alastruim, and Mhic Alsandair.

The Irish and Scottish Gaelic have many Anglicised forms. The Scottish Gaelic name has been borne by a notable Scottish clan, which was once seated on the south-west coast of Scotland. The Irish names have been borne by descendants of Scots who settled in the north of Ireland.

== Etymology ==
The Scottish Gaelic MacAlasdair originated as a patronym, in the form of mac Alasdair, which translates into English as "son of Alasdair". Today, however, the surname MacAlasdair does not refer to the actual name of the bearer's father. The name Alasdair is a Scottish Gaelic equivalent of the English Alexander, which is derived from the Latin form of the Greek Alexandros. This Greek name is composed of two elements: the first, alexein, meaning "to defend"; the second, aner, meaning "man" or "warrior" (the genitive of aner is andros). Alexander has been an extremely popular given name in Scotland since the Middle Ages, when it was borne by three Scottish kings. The name was introduced into the country through Margaret (died 1093), the Hungarian-born wife of Malcolm III, King of Scots; in time one of their sons became Alexander I, King of Scots (died 1124).

One of the earliest instances of a form of MacAlasdair are records of "Ranald Makalestyr", who obtained a lease of lands in Arran, in 1455. Ranald is later also referred to in documents as "Ranald Alexandri", and "Reginald McAlestir" (also "McAlestere" and "McAlestre").

== Feminine form ==
MacAlasdair is a masculine surname. The Scottish Gaelic form of this surname for females is NicAlasdair. This feminine name is composed of the prefix Nic- which is an abbreviated form of the Scottish Gaelic nighean which translates into English as "daughter". Like the masculine form of the surname, NicAlasdair no longer refers to the actual name of the bearer's father.

== Gaelic cognates ==
Mac Alasdair

The Scottish Gaelic MacAlasdair is rendered in Irish as Mac Alasdair. Mac Alasdair translates into English as "son of Alasdar", and like the Scottish Gaelic form, the surname does not refer to the bearer's father. The given name Alasdar is an Irish form of the English Alexander. The form of this Irish surname for unmarried females is Nic Alasdair; this name is actually a contracted form of Iníon Mhic Alasdair, which translates into English as "daughter of Mac Alasdair". The form of Mac Alasdair for married females is Bean Mhic Alasdair, which translates into English as "wife of Mac Alasdair"; this surname can also be represented in the contracted form Mhic Alasdair.

Mac Alastair

A similar Irish surname is Mac Alastair, which translates into English as "son of Alastar". The Irish Alastar is an equivalent of the English Alexander. Like, Mac Alasdair, this surname no longer refers to the bearer's father, and like Mac Alasdair feminine forms of the name include Nic Alastair, Bean Mhic Alastair, and Mhic Alastair.

Mac Alastruim

Another form of the name is Mac Alastruim, which translates into English as "son of Alastrom". The Irish Alastrom is an equivalent of the English Alexander. Feminine forms of Mac Alastruim include Nic Alastair, Bean Mhic Alastair, and Mhic Alastair.

Mac Alsandair

Another form of the Irish name is Mac Alsandair, which translates into English as "son of Alsandar". (Note: According to Woulfe, Alastar and Alastrom are more common Irish forms of the English Alexander than Alsandar, and forms of Alexander were commonly used by the Anglo-Normans who settled in Ireland.) Feminine forms of Mac Alsandair include Nic Alsandair, Bean Mhic Alsandair, and Mhic Alsandair.

== Anglicised forms ==
Anglicised forms of MacAlasdair, in use today, include Alexander, Callister, Macalaster, Macalester, Macalister, Macallaster, MacAllister, Maccalister, McAllister. Anglicised forms of Mac Alasdair include Alister, MacAlester, MacAlister, MacAllister, MacCalister, and MacCallister. Anglicised forms of Mac Alastair include Callister, MacAlister, MacAllister, MacCallister, MacEllister, MacAlester, MacClester, MacLester, and Lester. Anglicised forms of Mac Alastruim include MacElistrum, MacElestrim, MacEllistram. Anglicised forms of Mac Alsandair include Alexander, MacAlshander, MacAlshender, MacAlshinder, MacCalshander, MacElshander, and MacKalshander.

== Families ==
The surname MacAlasdair, and its various Anglicised forms, have been borne by members of Clan MacAlister, a noted Scottish clan that was historically seated on the south-west coast of Scotland. These MacAlasdairs are a branch of Clan Donald (Scottish Gaelic Clann Dhòmhnaill), although there has been confusion over the identity of the clan's eponymous ancestor. As late as the late 19th century, it was claimed that the clan descended from Alasdair Òg, son and heir of Aonghas Mòr, son and heir of Dòmhnall (died mid 13th century), the eponymous ancestor of Clan Donald. However a more modern understanding is that the clan's eponymous ancestor is Alasdair Mòr (died 1299), younger son of Dòmhnall (eponymous ancestor of Clan Donald).

Bearers of the Irish Mac Alastair, and its various Anglicised forms, include descendants of Clan Donald who settled in what is today County Antrim, Northern Ireland. Bearers of the Irish Mac Alastruim, and its various Anglicised forms, include a family centred in what is today County Kerry, Republic of Ireland; this family, according to Patrick Woulfe who wrote in the early 20th century, has been located in Kerry for centuries. According to Woulfe, Mac Alsandair, and associated Anglicised forms, are also of Scottish origin.

== People with the surname ==
- Goraidh Mac Eachann MacAlasdair, (16th century), Scottish, Chief of Clan MacAlister
- Eachann Mac Goraidh MacAlasdair, (17th century), Scottish, Chief of Clan MacAlister
