= Alexander River (New Zealand) =

River in West Coast Region, New Zealand

- Location of the Alexander River

Physical characteristics
- Source: Mount Puttick
  - location: Victoria Range
  - coordinates: 42.35°S 172.025°E
  - elevation: 1,230 m (4,040 ft)
- Mouth: Upper Grey River
  - coordinates: 42.346°S 171.881°E
  - elevation: 215 m (705 ft)

Basin features
- Progression: Alexander River → Upper Grey River → Grey River / Māwheranui → Tasman Sea

The Alexander River is a river on the West Coast of New Zealand's South Island. It rises in the Victoria Range on the slopes of Mount Puttick before flowing west, ultimately reaching the Upper Grey River. Gold mining formerly took place in the area around the river as part of the West Coast Gold Rush, with a former stamping battery located on the left bank of the river.
