= Peter Alexander =

Peter Alexander may refer to:

- Pete Alexander (born Grover Cleveland Alexander; 1887–1950), American baseball player
- Peter Alexander (Shakespearean scholar) (1893–1969), professor of English language and literature at the University of Glasgow
- Peter Alexander (Austrian performer) (1926–2011), Austrian performer
- Peter Alexander (artist) (1939–2020), American artist
- Peter Alexander (English actor) (born 1952), English actor
- Peter Alexander (fashion designer) (born 1965), Australian fashion designer
- Peter Alexander (journalist) (born 1976), American television journalist
