= Andrew Smith (zoologist) =

British surgeon and zoologist (1797–1872)

Sir Andrew Smith KCB
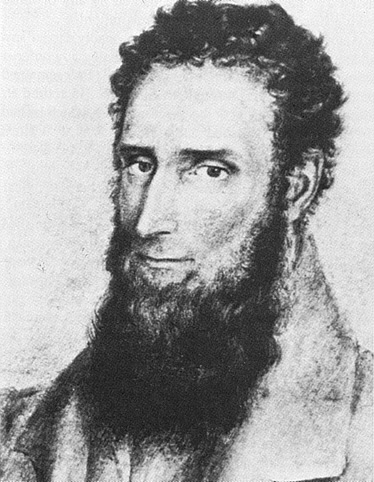
- Sir Andrew Smith
- Born: 3 December 1797; Hawick, Roxburghshire
- Died: 11 August 1872 (aged 74); London
- Education: University of Edinburgh
- Scientific career
- Fields: Botany; surgeon; ethnologist; zoologist
- Author abbrev. (zoology): A. Smith

Sir Andrew Smith KCB (3 December 1797 – 11 August 1872) was a British surgeon, explorer, ethnologist and zoologist. He is considered the father of zoology in South Africa having described many species across a wide range of groups in his major work, Illustrations of the Zoology of South Africa.

Smith was born in Hawick, Roxburghshire. He qualified in medicine at the University of Edinburgh obtaining an M.D. degree in 1819, having joined the Army Medical Services in 1816.

== South Africa 1820–1837 ==
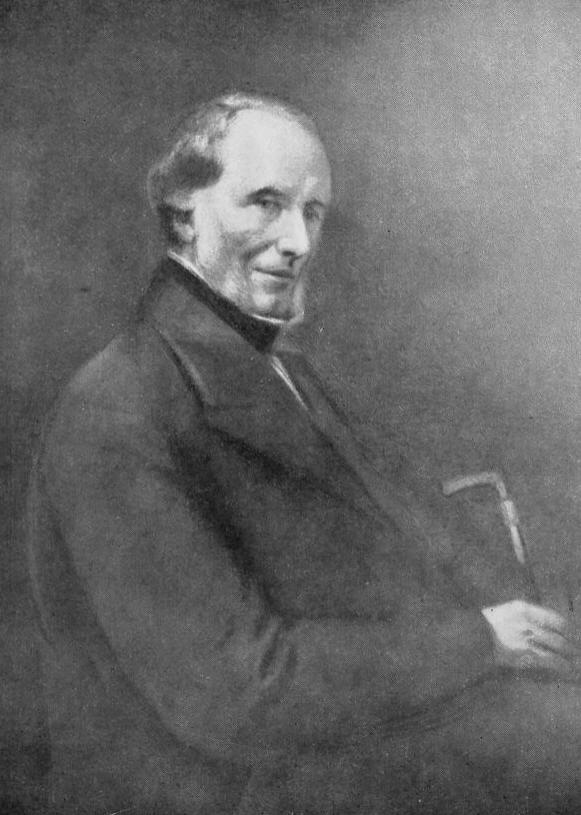

In 1820 he was ordered to the Cape Colony and was sent to Grahamstown to supervise the medical care of European soldiers and soldiers of the Cape Corps. He was appointed the Albany district surgeon in 1822 and started the first free dispensary for indigent patients in South Africa. He led a scientific expedition into the interior and was able to indulge in his interests of natural history and anthropology. On several occasions, he was sent by governors on confidential missions to visit Bantu tribes beyond the frontier, such as his trip to Kaffraria in 1824, when he made copious notes on the customs of the Xhosa tribes. In 1825, the Governor of the Cape Colony, Lord Charles Somerset, nominated Smith as the first Superintendent of the South African Museum of Natural History in Cape Town. In 1828, Smith was sent to Namaqualand by Lieutenant-Governor of the Eastern District of the Cape of Good Hope Richard Bourke to report on the Bushmen there. As a result, Smith wrote Observations relative to the origin and history of the Bushmen published in 1830, and subsequently On the origin and history of the Bushmen in 1831. In the same year of 1831, there were rumours of serious unrest in the east, causing Governor Sir Lowry Cole to send Smith to Natal in January 1832. Here he interviewed Dingaan and reported back to Cole, arousing a great deal of interest in the business world of the Cape. It was mainly his report that caused Britain to annex Port Natal in 1844 and turn it into a Crown colony. Similarly in 1833 the reports of traders from North of the Orange River led to an 18-month-long expedition by Andrew to Basutoland, Kuruman, the headquarters of Mzilikazi and as far north as the Magaliesberg, Charles Davidson Bell going along as expedition artist. Smith returned with two of Mzilikazi's izinDuna who forged an alliance with the Cape Colony on behalf of their chief.

In 1833, the South African Institution nominated Smith as coordinator of the Committee of Management for the "Expedition into Central Africa." Smith's Report of the expedition for exploring Central Africa was published in 1836. Except for two short reports that appeared after his return to Cape Town from the interior in 1836, no detailed account of his travels was ever published. Smith's diary, however, was later edited by Percival R. Kirby and published by the Van Riebeeck Society in 1939–40 as Nos. 20 and 21 of their first series, under the title The Diary of Dr. Andrew Smith, Director of the 'Expedition for Exploring Central Africa', 1834–36. (OCLC 4550857.)

Smith met the young geologist Charles Darwin when the second voyage of the Beagle touched at the Cape in May 1836, and showed him slate rock formations. He also gave Darwin some rock samples he had collected the year before. These are now held by the Sedgwick Museum of Earth Sciences. Darwin and Smith corresponded about how the large animals in South Africa lived on sparse vegetation, showing that a lack of luxuriant vegetation did not explain the extinction of the giant creatures whose fossils Darwin had found in South America. Darwin frequently mentioned Smith in his writings, and sponsored him to gain membership of the Royal Society in 1857.

== Britain 1837–1872 ==
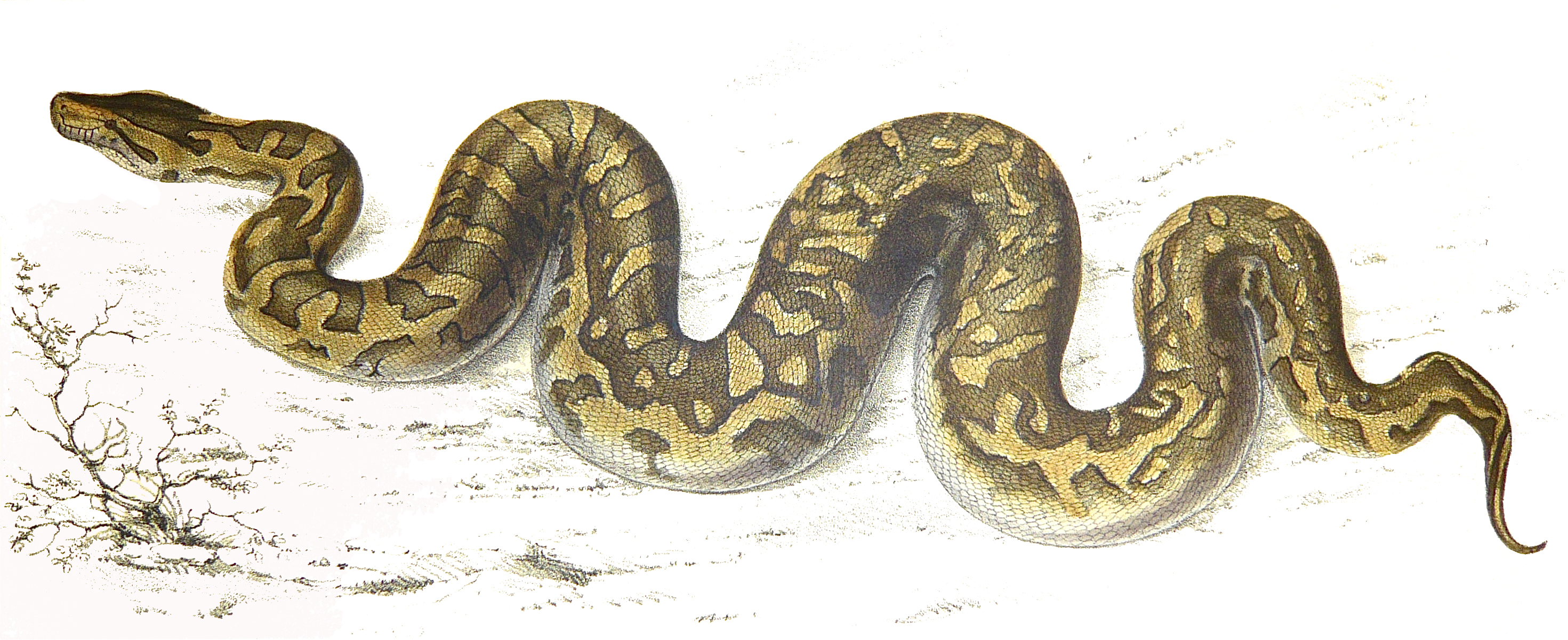
1840 drawing of Southern African rock python by Sir Andrew Smith

Smith returned to the United Kingdom in January 1837 and shortly afterward started publishing the five volumes making up Illustrations of the Zoology of South Africa (1838–50). He advanced rapidly through the ranks of the medical service, becoming staff surgeon and principal medical officer at Fort Pitt, Chatham in 1841. In 1844 he married his housekeeper Ellen Henderson and converted to her Roman Catholic faith. In 1845 he became assistant to Sir James McGrigor, the director-general of the army medical department, becoming Director-General of the Army Medical Services in 1853 when Sir James retired. He was responsible for the organizing of medical services during the Crimean War, amidst serious charges of inefficiency and incompetence from The Times and Florence Nightingale. A commission of inquiry exonerated him and he received honours from universities and learned societies. Ill-health forced his resignation, he was succeeded by Thomas Alexander, in 1858 when he was created Knight Commander of the Bath.

== See also ==
- Category:Taxa named by Andrew Smith (zoologist)

== Animals named after Andrew Smith ==
Andrew Smith is commemorated in the scientific names of three species of reptiles.

- Gekko smithii, a gecko
- Lepidophyma smithii, a lizard
- Pangshura smithii, a freshwater turtle

He is also honoured in the names of the following birds:

- Cape shoveler (Spatula smithi)
- Karoo thrush (Turdus smithi)
- Annobón paradise flycatcher (Terpsiphone smithii)
- 3 species of African broadbills in the genus Smithornis

== Correspondence with Charles Darwin ==
- 16 March 1839
- 1862
- 1867
- 17 Apr 1871
- 16 May 1871
- Anderson, L. I. (2009) Charles Darwin and Andrew Smith: an overseas exchange. Scottish Journal of Geology, 45, 59 -68.
