= Ring announcer =

Sport announcer

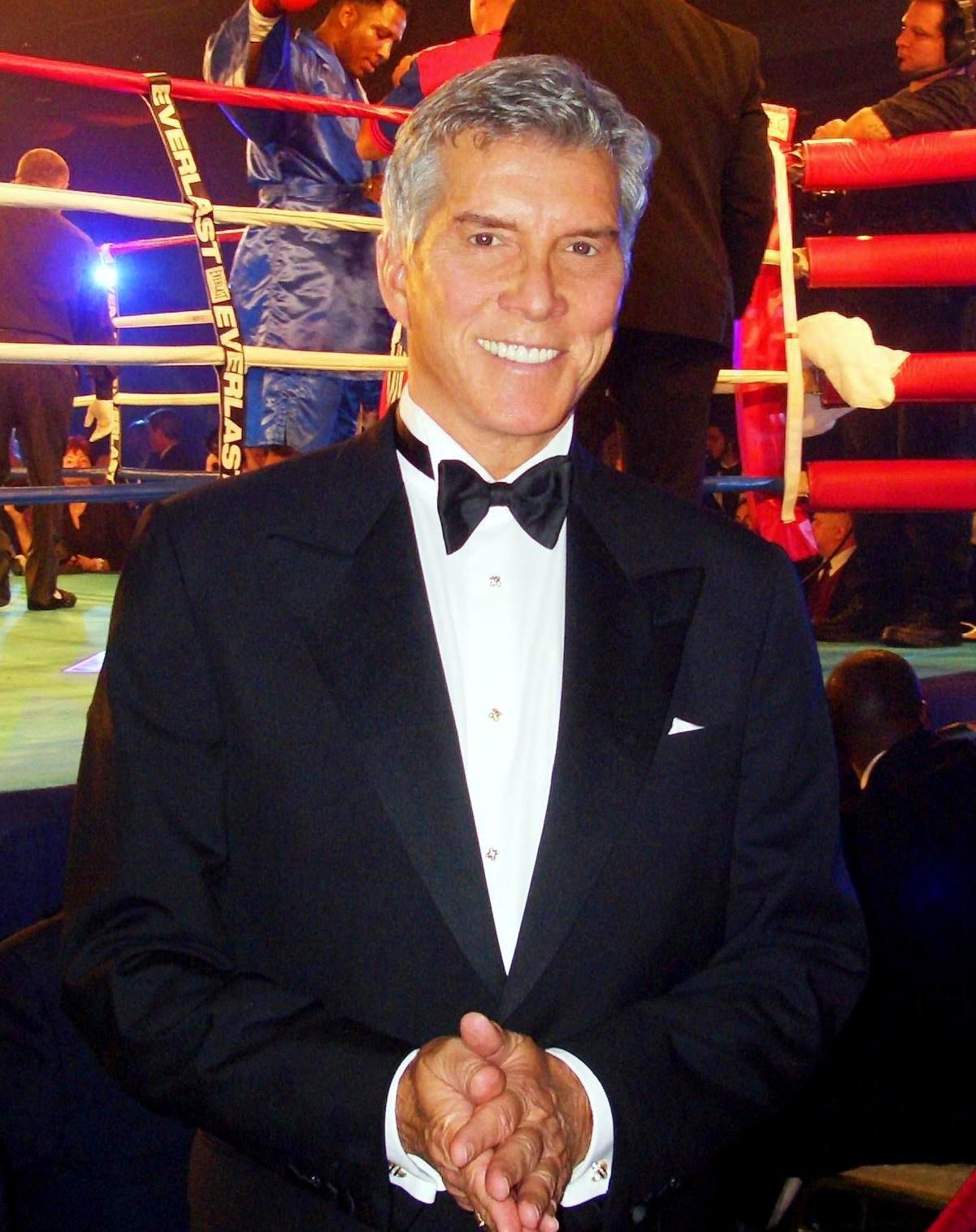
Boxing announcer Michael Buffer, considered a defining voice in pop culture. Called "the world's most legendary ring announcer" by ESPN.

A ring announcer is an in-ring (and sometimes on-camera) employee or contractor for a boxing, professional wrestling or mixed martial arts event or promotion, who introduces the competitors to the audience.

In boxing and mixed martial arts bouts, introductions occur after both fighters have entered the ring or cage. Along with each fighter's name, the announcer typically also announces their height, weight, town, nickname, win–loss record and any current or past titles the fighter has won. In MMA, the fighting discipline is usually announced. In professional wrestling, wrestlers are similarly introduced, though usually before or as they come to the ring (the weight of each female wrestler is unannounced in most promotions). In-ring introductions are sometimes used for title matches or other major bouts, to add a "big fight feel".

The ring announcer often states the rules of the match. In boxing and MMA, this is usually limited to the number of scheduled rounds and the length of each round. In professional wrestling, the variations are much more numerous and so the announcer may have to explain significantly more to the audience.

When an MMA or boxing bout concludes, the ring announcer announces the winner, time of finish and method. If the fight lasts all scheduled rounds, the announcer will read the fight judges' scorecard totals, before announcing a unanimous, majority, or split decision victory for one of the fighters, or a draw. This is typically done from inside the ring or cage.

In professional wrestling, the announcement is usually performed outside the ring, and typically does not mention the time or method of victory unless it is from disqualification, submission, or knockout; however, as professional wrestling shows do incorporate an official timekeeper at ringside, much like boxing and MMA, some ring announcers may be informed of the time of the fall at the match's conclusion and will relay that information to the audience as well.

Even further to this, some professional wrestling matches will stipulate a time limit, within which a wrestler must win if they wish to avoid a time-limit draw. In cases like this, the ring announcer may inform the audience of how much time has passed (and will ordinarily do so every five minutes) and how much time remains.

In a championship match, the announcer specifies that the winner is either still the champion or the new champion.

== List of notable ring announcers ==
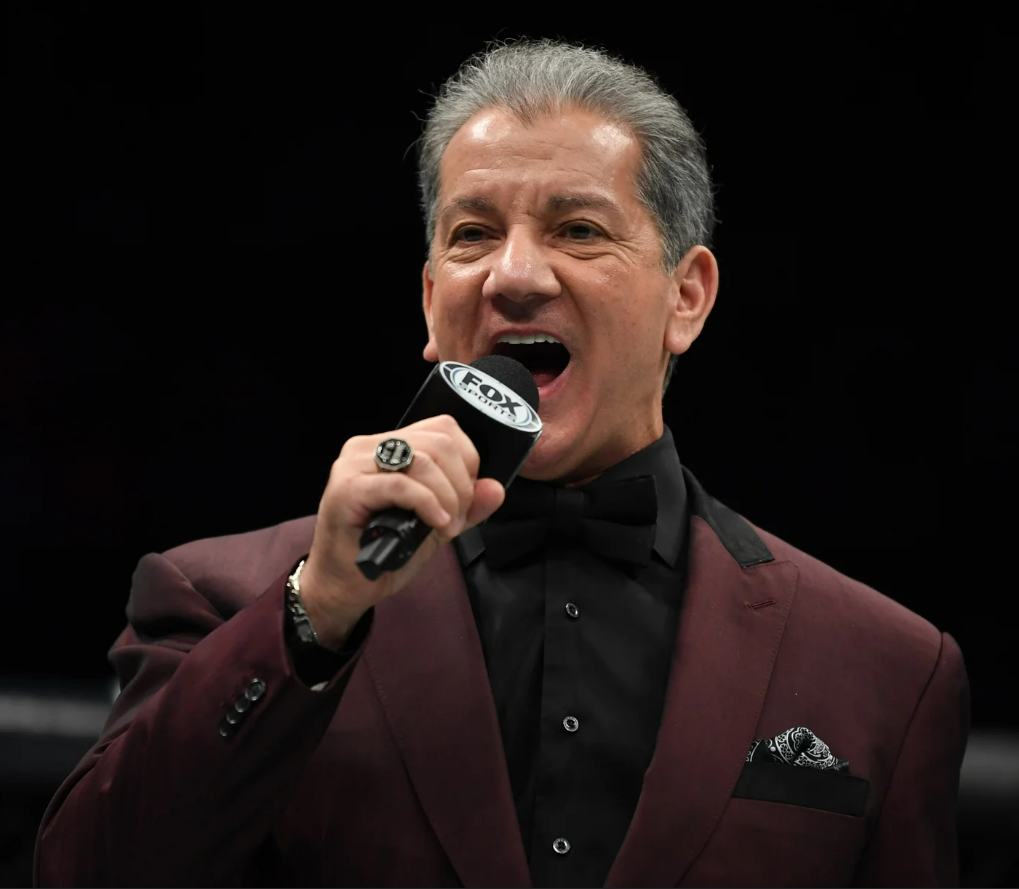
UFC ring announcer Bruce Buffer, who has worked for the UFC since 1996.

=== Fighting ===
- Bob Alexander (Boxing, MMA, Kickboxing)
- Charly Arnolt (UFC) - On April 27, 2024, she became the first female ring announcer in UFC history, temporarily replacing Joe Martínez, who was reportedly ill
- Michael Buffer (Boxing, K1, MMA, formerly WCW)
- Bruce Buffer (UFC)
- Dom Lau (ONE Championship)
- David Diamante (Boxing, MMA, Muay Thai)
- Cyrus Fees (Xtreme Fighting Championships, Extreme Fighting Championship (EFC))
- Bret "Hollywood" Freeman (Cage Rage Ultimate Challenge, Cage Warriors, Cage Contender and IFPA)
- Lenne Hardt (MMA PRIDE, DREAM, ONE Championship, GLORY)
- Joe A. Martinez (WEC, Cage Warriors Fighting Championship, Solo Boxeo-Tecate Golden Boy Promotions)
- Kody Mommaerts or 'Big Mo' (Sky Sports, BOXXER, BYB)
- Jimmy Lennon (Boxing, father of Jimmy Lennon Jr.)
- Jimmy Lennon Jr. (Boxing, MMA Strikeforce)
- Tina Schüßler (Boxing, K1, MMA, Kickboxing) Germany
- Andy Shepherd (PFL)
- Thomas Treiber (Boxing)
- Ricky Wright (Boxing, MMA, Muay Thai, Lethwei)

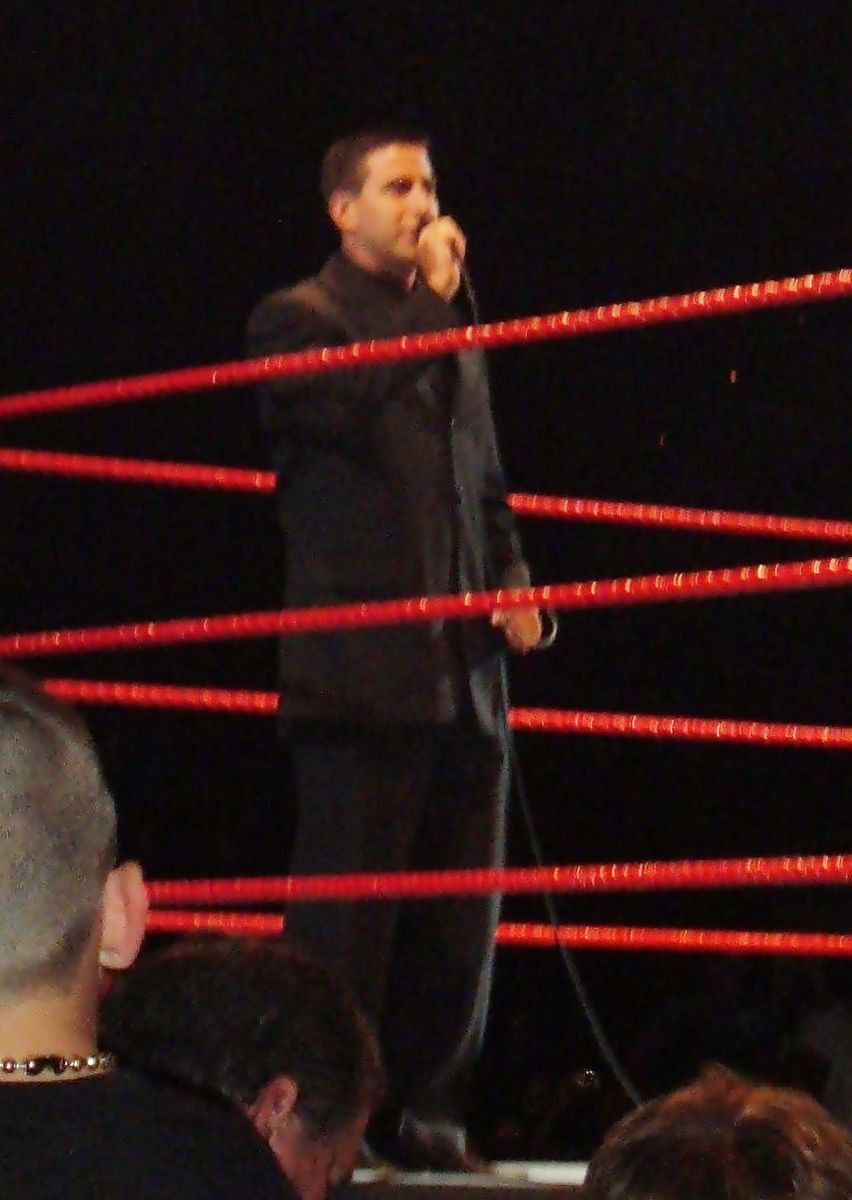
Professional wrestling ring announcer Justin Roberts, who has predominantly worked for both WWE and AEW.

=== Professional wrestling ===
- Alexa Bliss (WWE)
- Jeremy Borash (WCW and TNA)
- Scarlett Bordeaux (ROH)
- Michael Buffer (WCW)
- Gary Cappetta (WWF, AWA, NWA, WCW, and AEW)
- Tony Chimel (WWE and WWF)
- Bill Dunn (WWF)
- Howard Finkel (WWE and WWF)
- Dasha Fuentes/Gonzalez (WWE and AEW)
- Sunny (WWF)
- Lilian Garcia (WWE)
- Shaul Guerrero (AEW)
- Christy Hemme (TNA)
- JoJo (WWE)
- Kelly Kelly (OVW)
- Kevin Kelly (ROH)
- Lauren Mayhew (WWE)
- Mike McGuirk (WWE)
- Joe McHugh (WWWF/WWF)
- Rosa Mendes (FCW)
- "Mean" Gene Okerlund (AWA, WWF/WWE, and WCW)
- David Penzer (WCW and TNA)
- Summer Rae (FCW and WWE)
- Brandi Rhodes (WWE and AEW)
- Justin Roberts (WWE and AEW)
- Ricardo Rodriguez (WWE)
- Mike Rome (WWE)
- Savannah (FCW and WWE)
- Byron Saxton (WWE)
- Andy Shepherd (WWE)
- SoCal Val (TNA)
- Alicia Taylor (WWE)
- Tiffany (FCW)
- Caylee Turner (WWE)
- Samantha Irvin (WWE)

== See also ==
- Sports commentator
