= Joseph Alexander =

Joseph Alexander may refer to:

- Joseph Alexander (cellist) (1772–1840), German cellist and music teacher
- Joseph Addison Alexander (1809–1860), American bible scholar
- Joseph W. Alexander (born 1947), American politician from Oklahoma
- J. Grubb Alexander (1887–1932), American screenwriter
- Joseph H. Alexander (1938–2014), American marine and historian
- Joe Alexander (born 1986), American basketball player
- Joe Alexander Jr. (born 1994), American politician from New Hampshire
- Doc Alexander (born Joseph A. Alexander; 1898–1975), American football player and coach
