= Gary Alexander =

Gary Alexander may refer to:

- Gary Alexander (baseball) (born 1953), US baseball player
- Gary Alexander (basketball) (born 1969), American basketball player
- Gary Alexander (footballer) (born 1979), English footballer
- Gary Alexander (sound engineer), American sound engineer
- Gary Alexander (martial art pioneer), American martial artist
- Gary Alexander (politician), American politician in Washington
- Gary Alexander (wrestler) (born 1944), American Olympic wrestler
- Jules Gary Alexander from the band the Association, known also as Gary Alexander

== See also ==
- Alexander (surname)
