= World Famous Muriel =

Book series by Sue Alexander

World Famous Muriel is a series of books written by Sue Alexander. The first two books, World Famous Muriel (1984) and World Famous Muriel and the Scary Dragon (1985), were illustrated by Chris L. Demarest. The third, World Famous Muriel and the Magic Mystery (1990), was illustrated by Marla Frazee.

Book reviewer Effie Meyer, of the Post-Bulletin, wrote in a review of the third book that it is a "junior detective story".

The main character is great at tightrope walking, hence her title of "world famous". She is asked to resolve conflicts in each book, such as dealing with an antagonist or finding an item. In the second book, Muriel, at the request of the King of Pompandcircumstance, deals with a dirty dragon. In the third book, Professor M.C. Ballyhoo asks Muriel to find the Great Hokus Pokus in exchange for peanut butter cookies. The professor is desperate for a resolution.

Meyer wrote in a review of the third book that Muriel is "cool and composed", "impish", and "self-assured".

== Reception ==
Raymond Teague, in the Fort Worth Star-Telegram, described the first book as a "charmer" that has "delightful" artwork.

In regards to the second book, Connie S. Sokoloff in The Kansas City Star gave a negative review, stating the book is "overpriced", that the artwork is "pale", that it does not have "whimsey and fancy", and that it "leaves little to the child's imagination."

In regards to the third book, Bessie Egan of California State Library gave praise to the "whimsical, full-color illustrations" which she said had "vitality and humorous detail." Meyer also praised the artwork, calling it "wonderfully bright and detailed" and stated that it had "warmth".
