= Robert Alexander =

Robert Alexander may refer to:

== Politics ==
- Robert Alexander (Maryland politician) (1740–1805), loyalist Continental congressman from Maryland
- Robert Alexander (North Carolina politician), 18th-century North Carolina politician
- Robert Alexander (Newfoundland politician) (1827–1884), merchant and politician in Newfoundland
- Robert Alexander, 16th Baron Cobham (1885–1951), Baron Cobham, British peer
- Robert Alexander, Baron Alexander of Weedon (1936–2005), British barrister and Conservative politician
- Robert Keith Alexander (1930–2014), Alberta MLA, 1982–1985
- Robert Alexander (Irish politician) (1752–1827), Anglo-Irish politician
- Robert Alexander (Virginia patriot) (1746–1820), Virginia patriot and planter

== Sports ==
- Robert Alexander (American football) (1958–2022), American football running back
- Robert Alexander (Irish sportsman) (1910–1943), Irish rugby union and cricket player
- Robert A. Alexander (1819–1867), American horse breeder
- Robert Alexander (New Zealand cricketer) (1911–1988)

== Other ==
- Robert Alexander (United States Army officer) (1863–1941), American major general in World War I
- Robert Alexander (barrister) (1795–1843), British philanthropist
- Robert P. Alexander (1904–1985), collector and expert on Japanese classic postage stamps
- Robert Alexander (photographer) (1943–1989), American photographer
- Robert J. Alexander (1918–2010), scholar at Rutgers University
- Robert McNeill Alexander (1934–2016), British zoologist, and professor at University of Leeds
- Robert William Alexander (1905–1979), Irish writer
- Robert Alexander (artist) (1840–1923), Scottish artist
- Robert Wayne Alexander (1941–2023), American biologist
- Robert Alexander (priest) (1788–1840), Anglican priest in Ireland

== See also ==
- Bob Alexander (disambiguation)
