= Frances Alexander =

Frances Alexander may refer to:

- Cecil Frances Alexander (1818–1895), Irish poet and hymnodist
- Frances Alexander (politician) (1919–2010), American politician
- Frances E. Alexander (1908–1958), British geologist

== See also ==
- Francis Alexander (disambiguation)
