= Donald Alexander =

Donald Alexander may refer to:

- Donald Alexander (filmmaker) (1913–1993), British documentary film-maker
- Donald Alexander (lawyer) (1921–2009), tax lawyer and Nixon administration official
- Donald Alexander (researcher) (1928–2007), Scottish physician and researcher
- Donald G. Alexander (born 1942), American lawyer and justice on the Maine Supreme Judicial Court
