= David Magidson =

American professional clown and writer (born 1963)

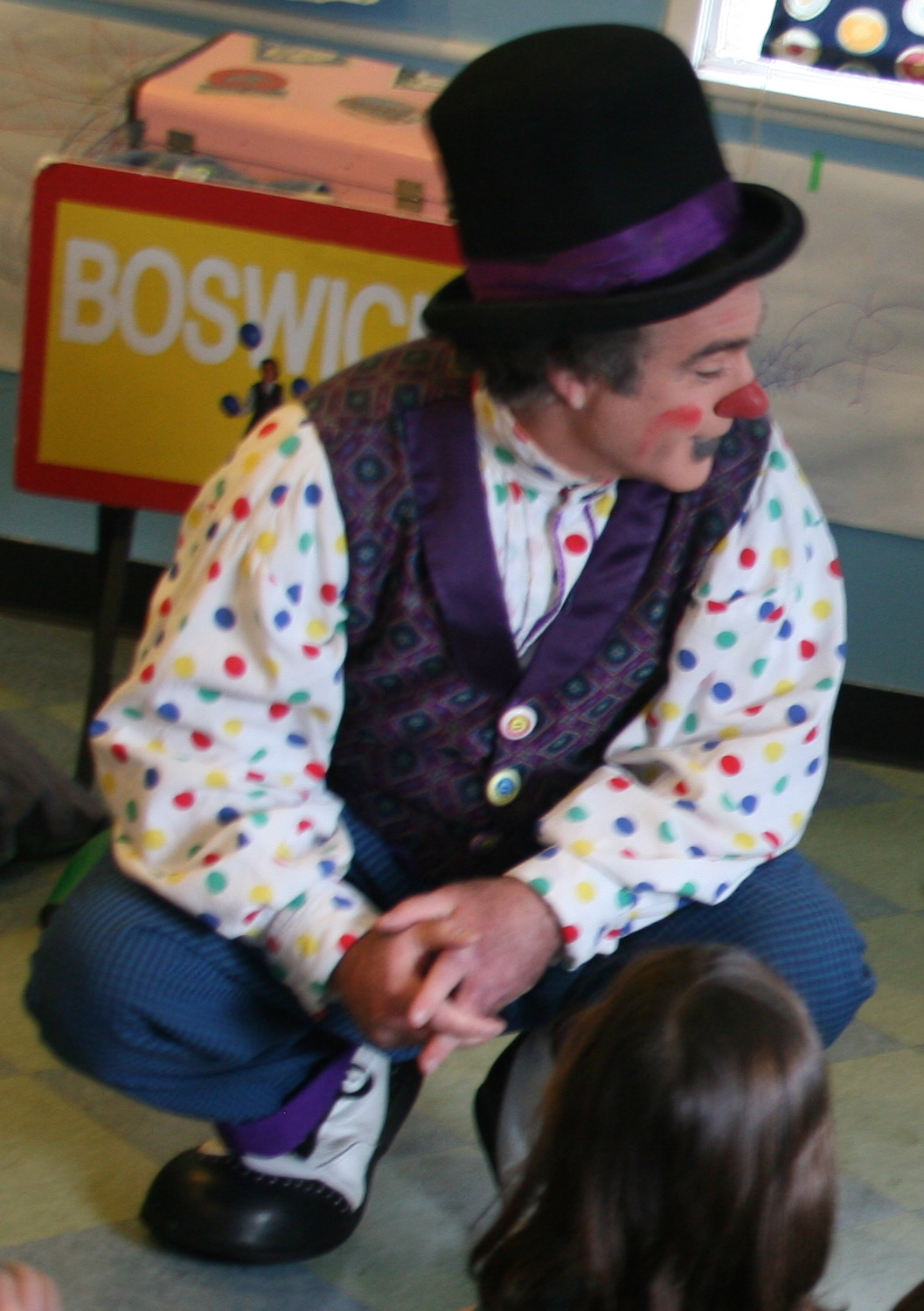
- David Magidson as Boswick the Clown on March 24, 2012.
- Born: David Walter Magidson; March 6, 1963 (age 63); Encino, California, U.S.
- Education: Emerson College
- Occupations: Clown; actor; filmmaker; writer
- Website: boswick.net

David Magidson (born March 6, 1963) is an American professional clown, actor and writer.

== Early life and education ==
He was born in Encino, California, and is an alumnus of Emerson College, located in Boston, Massachusetts.

== Career ==
As his character Boswick the Clown, he has performed for Ringling Bros. and Barnum & Bailey Circus and Make*A*Circus. He has appeared as a clown in the movies Milk (2008) and Dr. Dolittle (1998), as well as in commercials for the Pacific Bell Yellow Pages, Nissan, and BMW.

Since 2010, Magidson has written a blog on Blogger "designed to help family entertainers with all aspects of their performing".

As David Magidson, he performed as a member of the comedy-troupe "The Kloons" and in the San Francisco Fringe Festival. As the character Boswick the Clown, Magidson appears at over 300 events each year, including schools and libraries, specializing in large juggling, magic, and comedy clown shows for children four years old to eight years old.

=== Notable works ===
Magidson is the author of the children's joke book Hey Quit Clowning Around: Think Talk and Act Like a Clown

He has also co-written and starred as Boswick the Clown in the children's DVDs Here Comes the Clown as well as Here Comes Boswick the Clown with Phoebe the Duck, directed by Jay Alexander.

Magidson has written and starred in two one-man shows. Through the Eyes of a Clown was featured in the 2014 San Francisco Fringe Festival. Pushing 40, cowritten with Ty DeMartino, played at the Shelton Theater in San Francisco as part of the 2003 Comedy on the Square Festival.

== Personal life ==
Magidson lives in San Francisco with his wife and two children.
