= Robinson River (New Zealand) =

Coordinates: 42°27′27″S 171°59′53″E

Location
- Country: New Zealand

Physical characteristics
- Source
  - location: Mount Boscawen
  - elevation: 1,390 metres (4,560 ft)
- Mouth
  - location: Upper Grey River
  - elevation: 311 metres (1,020 ft)
- Length: 23.5 km (14.6 mi)

The Robinson River is a river in the West Coast Region of the South Island of New Zealand. It is a tributary of the Upper Grey River and much of the river lies within the Lake Sumner Conservation Park. Rising on the slopes of Mount Boscawen (1,780 metres (5,840 ft)) on the main divide about 12 kilometres (7.5 mi) south of the Lewis Pass, the river runs west-southwest along a straight, narrow valley before turning northwest to reach the Upper Grey.

Some older maps show the river as the Marchant River or the Marchant Robinson River.

A two-day tramping track known as the Robinson River track runs up the Robinson River before crossing a saddle via a poled route to join with the Lake Christabel track. There are two tramping huts maintained by the Department of Conservation beside the river.

The river is named for John Perry Robinson (1809–1865), a superintendent of Nelson Province.
