= Alexander violin =

String instrument

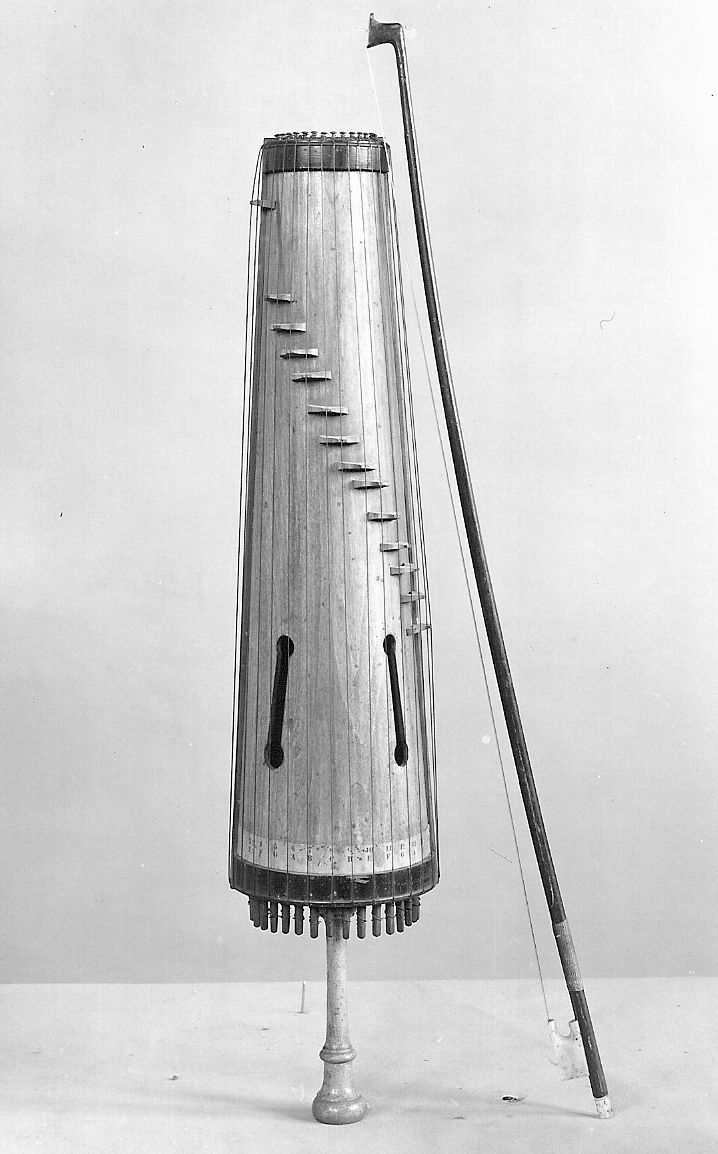
An Alexander violin, from the Crosby Brown Collection of Musical Instruments at the Metropolitan Museum of Art.

The Alexander violin is a string instrument designed by Sylvanus J. Talbott, of Milford, New Hampshire, in 1887 in the United States. The instrument was produced commercially and was available for purchase in D.H Bearman's 1890 catalogue. The instrument was tuned in C major, with sixteen wire strings strung over independently movable wooden bridges. The strings were tuned diatonically, and was designed to be played resting on the player's arm. It has a handle so that it can be rotated, and the strings can be played more easily.

It is typically made with pine wood and various other materials.

== See also ==
- Violin
