= Nykolai Aleksander =

German artist

Nykolai Aleksander (born 1978) is a German artist and a German Stellar Art Award recipient.

== Biography ==
Nykolai Aleksander was born in Germany and emigrated to England in the late 1990s. In 2001 she began working with Andrew E. Maugham on his book, Convivium, which led her to pick up drawing, first simply to visualise the characters from the book, but by 2002, getting her hands on a Wacom tablet, she made the move into digital art. In 2005, she was asked by Ballistic Publishing to submit her work for publication, and for the next few years, her paintings were regularly featured in their books.

Working for both private and commercial clients, with commissions ranging from portraits and book covers to character illustrations and painting tutorials, she made a name for herself in the CG art world. Until 2013, her work was published in numerous magazines, such as 2Dartist, Advanced Photoshop, Imagine FX, Intel Visual Adrenaline and Fantasy Art China, as well as in over a dozen books, among others Digital Art Masters and Digital Painting Techniques by 3Dtotal and Focal Press, and received the Excellence Award by 3DTotal, the CG Choice Award from CGSociety, the Stellar Art Award from Digital Arts California and CG Excellence Award nomination at the 2009 CG Overdrive Expo in Singapore.

In 2013, she withdrew from online and CG art communities and began focussing on her traditional work again, including a small handcrafted jewelry line called SuiGeneris. However, she continues to work selectively for clients in both digital and traditional media.
