= Sue Alexander (writer) =

American children's writer (1933–2008)

- Born: Sue Lynn Ratner; August 20, 1933; Tucson, Arizona, U.S.
- Died: July 3, 2008 (aged 74); Los Angeles, California, U.S.
- Education: Drake University; Northwestern University
- Occupation: Writer
- Spouse: Joel Alexander
- Children: 3
- Writing career
- Language: English
- Years active: 1969–2001
- Genres: realistic fiction, fantasy
- Notable work: Nadia the Willful (1983)

Sue Alexander (August 20, 1933 – July 3, 2008) was an American writer of children's literature. She authored 26 books for children as well as "scores of stories" for newspapers and magazines. She was also a children's book reviewer for the Los Angeles Times. She was a charter member and advisory board member of the Society of Children's Book Writers and Illustrators, which established two awards in her name in recognition of her efforts to educate and mentor aspiring writers.

== Early life and education ==
Sue Lynn Ratner was born in Tucson, Arizona, to Jack M. Ratner and Edith Pollock Ratner. Her family was Jewish. She had one younger brother. When she was a year old her family relocated to Los Angeles and when she was five they moved to Chicago. Sue Lynn was "small and uncoordinated for her age", and her mother encouraged her to spend her time reading. She became an avid reader, and also enjoyed telling over stories and making up stories to entertain herself and others.

She studied at Drake University from 1950 to 1952, and then transferred to Northwestern University for one year. She originally planned to become a journalist, but while attending Northwestern decided to major in psychology instead. She dropped out of college in her senior year to get married, and gave birth to her first child, a son, in 1956. She divorced her first husband and moved back to Los Angeles, where her parents also lived. In November 1959 she remarried to Joel Alexander, with whom she had another son and a daughter.

== Writing career ==
Her mother's death in 1967 prompted Alexander to "do something with my life that would have pleased my mother" and she began writing short stories for young readers. Her stories were published in the Los Angeles Times, Children's Playmate, Weekly Reader, and World of Disney, but she did not achieve success until the publication of her first book, Small Plays for You and a Friend, in 1973. She went on to publish 26 titles between 1973 and 2001.

Her most acclaimed book was Nadia the Willful (1983), which depicts the grief of a Bedouin girl whose brother has died. Alexander developed the story out of her own distress over her younger brother's death and her father's unwillingness to discuss it. Lila on the Landing (1987), drawn from her experience growing up in Chicago, described the loneliness of a girl who is rejected by her peers. While writing in different genres, including realistic fiction and fantasy, Alexander noted that the common theme in all her books is "the importance of feelings".

== Other activities ==
In 1968 Alexander became a charter member of the Society of Children's Book Writers (later renamed Society of Children's Book Writers and Illustrators). Alexander invested much time in building the organization and mentoring aspiring writers. She served as chair of the SCBWI advisory board for 33 years, coordinator of the Golden Kite Award for 25 years, joint coordinator of the annual Southern California SCBWI conference for 25 years, and Southern California office manager for 20 years. The organization expanded from an initial membership of three to more than 12,000 members by the time of her death.

Alexander was also a board member of the Children's Literature Council of Southern California, and a member of the Friends of Children and Libraries and the California Readers' Association.

She taught courses on picture book writing at the University of California, Los Angeles. From 1998 to 2007 she was a children's book reviewer for the Los Angeles Times.

== Awards and honors ==
In 1980 Alexander received the Dorothy C. McKenzie Award from the Southern California Council of Literature for Children and Young People "for distinguished contributions to the field of children's literature". Her book Nadia the Willful received the Friends of Children and Libraries FOCAL Award for Outstanding Contributions to Children and Literature from the Los Angeles Central Library; the Notable Children's Book in the Field of Social Studies; the 1984 Children's Book of the Year from the Child Study Association; and the 1984 Distinguished Work of Fiction award from the Southern California Council of Literature for Children and Young People.

In 1996 the international SCBWI established the Sue Alexander Most Promising New Work Award, which helps writers of new manuscripts connect with editors and agents. The Southern California branch of the SCBWI honored Alexander's contribution with the establishment of the Sue Alexander Service and Encouragement Award, which recognizes the organization's volunteers.

== Death and legacy ==
Alexander died on July 3, 2008, at her home in West Hills, Los Angeles, at the age of 74.

The Sue Alexander Papers, containing manuscripts, galleys, and correspondence related to Alexander's books and short stories, are housed at the De Grummond Children's Literature Collection at the University of Southern Mississippi.

== Bibliography ==
Alexander wrote the following books for young readers:

=== Fiction ===
- Behold the Trees (2001)
- One More Time, Mama. Marshall Cavendish. 1999. ISBN 0761450513.
- What's Wrong Now, Millicent?. Simon & Schuster Books for Young Readers. 1996. ISBN 0689806809.
- Sara's City. Houghton Mifflin. 1995. ISBN 9780395644836.
- Who Goes Out on Halloween?. Gareth Stevens Pub. 1989. ISBN 0836817591.
- World Famous Muriel and the Magic Mystery. Crowell. 1990. ISBN 0690047878.
- There's More...Much More (1987)
- Lila on the Landing. Clarion Books. 1987. ISBN 0899193404.
- World Famous Muriel and the Scary Dragon. Little, Brown. 1985. ISBN 0316031348.
- Witch, Goblin and Ghost Are Back (1985)
- World Famous Muriel (1984)
- Dear Phoebe. Little, Brown. 1984. ISBN 9780316031325.
- Nadia the Willful. Pantheon Books. 1983. ISBN 0394852656.
- Witch, Goblin and Ghost's Book of Things To Do. Pantheon Books. 1982. ISBN 0394846125.
- Witch, Goblin and Ghost in the Haunted Woods (1981)
- Whatever Happened to Uncle Albert? and Other Puzzling Plays. Houghton Mifflin. 1980. ISBN 0395300614.
- Seymour the Prince (1979)
- More Witch, Goblin and Ghost Stories. Pantheon Books. 1978. ISBN 0394839331.
- Marc the Magnificent (1978)
- Small Plays for Special Days (1977)
- Witch, Goblin and Sometimes Ghost. Pantheon Books. 1976. ISBN 0394832167.
- Peacocks Are Very Special. Doubleday. 1976. ISBN 0385021690.
- Nadir of the Streets. Macmillan. 1975.
- Small Plays for You and a Friend. Seabury Press. 1974. ISBN 0816431256.

=== Non-fiction ===
- America's Own Holidays (1988)
- Finding Your First Job. E. P. Dutton. 1980. ISBN 0525297251.

== Sources ==
- Cullinan, Bernice E.; Person, Diane Goetz, eds. (2005). The Continuum Encyclopedia of Children's Literature. A&C Black. ISBN 0826417787.
- Europa Publications (2003). International Who's Who of Authors and Writers 2004. Psychology Press. ISBN 1857431790.
- Lentz III, Harris M. (2009). Obituaries in the Performing Arts, 2008: Film, Television, Radio, Theatre, Dance, Music, Cartoons and Pop Culture. McFarland. p. 7. ISBN 978-0786453849.
- Sue Alexander Papers, Special Collections at The University of Southern Mississippi (de Grummond Children's Literature Collection)
