= Jeannette van Zutphen =

Dutch singer

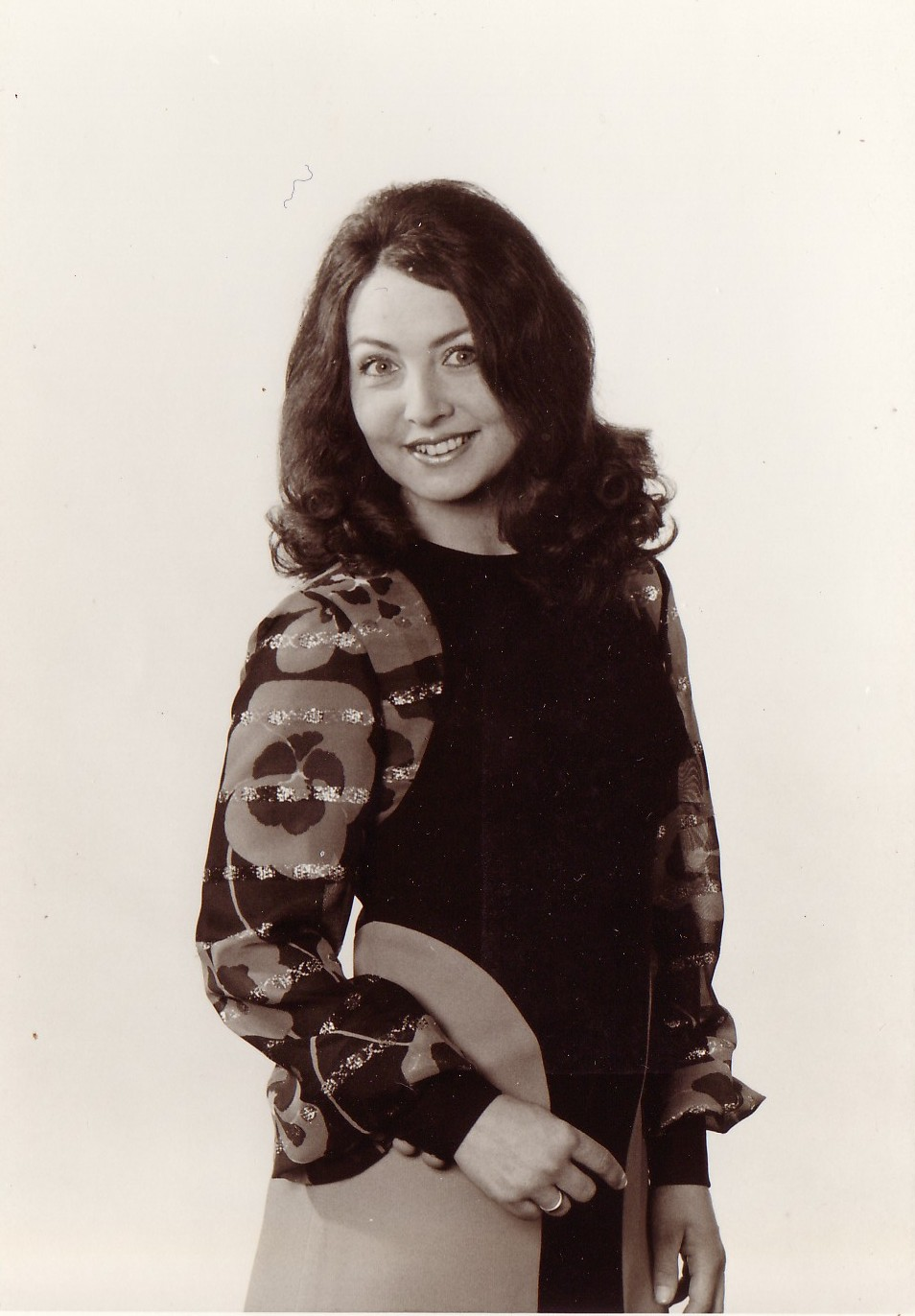
- Jeannette van Zutphen

Background information
- Born: December 10, 1949; Utrecht, Netherlands
- Origin: Netherlands
- Died: April 25, 2005 (aged 55)
- Occupation: Singer
- Instrument: Vocals
- Label: CNR
- Website: homepage

Jeannette van Zutphen (10 December 1949 – 25 April 2005) was a Dutch singer.

She was called the singing flower girl (My Fair Lady) because of her background in flowers. Van Zutphen performed in, among others, the Willeke and Willy Alberti shows, the Corry Brokken shows, and the television program Het Gulden Schot hosted by Lou van Burg. She also appeared in programs for Radio Netherlands Worldwide, such as Thuis aan boord. In addition, she frequently performed in the Gert and Hermien Timmerman shows, giving performances throughout the Netherlands. In the early 1970s, Van Zutphen was signed to CNR and recorded "Elke dag" – one of her favorite songs – with the label.
