= Donald Alexander (researcher) =

Scottish physician and Endocrinologist (1928–2007)

Donald Alexander FRCP(Edin)
- Born: William Donald Alexander; 2 April 1928; Glasgow, Lanarkshire, UK
- Died: 9 May 2007 (aged 79)
- Spouse: Ann Alexander
- Children: 3
- Father: Peter Alexander
- Relatives: Ann Dunlop Alexander (sister)
- Education: University of Glasgow, 1951
- Occupation: Physician
- Medical career
- Field: Endocrinology
- Institutions: National Institutes of Health
- Research: Thyroid disease

Donald Alexander FRCP(Edin) (1928 – 2007) was a Scottish physician and Endocrinologist, known for being a key figure in thyroid research during the 1960s and 1970s.

== Early life and education ==
William Donald Alexander was born on 2 April 1928 in Glasgow to Agnes Alexander (née Macdonald; 1895–1970) and Peter Alexander, a literary editor and Shakespearean scholar. Alexander was the middle brother of Peter 'Sandy' Alexander (1924–1944), killed serving in Second World War, and the literary scholar Nigel Alexander (1934–2005). Through his father Alexander was the nephew of Ann Dunlop Alexander, an artist and teacher, and great-nephew of Thomas Alexander (1847–1933), a professor of civil engineering at Imperial College of Engineering and Trinity College Dublin.

Alexander was educated at The Glasgow Academy. Alexander attended the University of Glasgow, and studied under Edward Johnson Wayne. In 1951, Alexander graduated with the Cullen Medal.

== Career ==
Whilst at the University of Glasgow Alexander developed an interest in thyroid disease. He then moved to the US to continue his research at the National Institutes of Health in Bethesda, Maryland where he worked on iodine metabolism. In 1964, he returned to Glasgow to study antithyroid drug action and perform metabolic studies. During this time, he pioneered the "block and replace" strategy for managing Graves' disease.

He retired in 1994, but continued to work as an advisor to the Abbey National in Glasgow which he only stopped at the end of 2006. He died on 9 May 2007.

== Personal life ==
Alexander was married to Ann Alexander, with whom he had three children.
