= Joseph Alexander (cellist) =

Joseph Alexander (also Johann; 1771 or 1772, Paderborn — June 6, 1840, Cologne) was a cellist active in Duisburg, Germany, noted for his teaching and pedagogical works.

He was distinguished more for the beauty of his tone and the excellence of his style than for any great command over technical difficulties. He wrote an instruction book for his instrument, Anweisung für das Violoncell (Breitkopf und Härtel, 1801), that was popular enough to be reprinted in 1854. He is also noted for his Air avec xxxvi Variations progressives pour le Violoncelle avec le doigté en différentes clefs, accomp. d'un violon et d'une basse (1802). He also published variations and potpourris.

His pupils included Johann Hermann Kufferath and Jacques Offenbach.

== Works ==
=== Pedagogical works ===
- Anweisung für das Violoncell; publ. Breitkopf und Härtel, Leipzig, 1801
- Air avec xxxvi Variations progressives pour le Violoncelle avec le doigté en différentes clefs, accomp. d'un violon et d'une basse; publ. Breitkopf und Härtel, Leipzig, 1802

=== Individual compositions ===
- Dix variations pour le violoncelle, avec accompagnement d'un violon, sur l'air "O mein lieber Augustin" (cello and violin); publ. J. J. Hummel, Berlin
- Six variations pour violoncelle et violon, sur l'air allemand "Mich fliehen alle freuden" (cello and violin)
- Ariette avec sept variations pour violoncelle et violon (cello and violin)
- Pot-pourri pour violoncelle avec accompagnement de violon (Potpourri in G) (trio for violin, cello and bass) Op. 6; Breitkopf und Hartel, Leipzig c. 1804
