= Ann Dunlop Alexander =

Scottish artist (1896–1969)

- Born: 16 March 1896; Glasgow, Lanarkshire, UKGBI
- Died: 18 October 1969 (aged 73); Glasgow, Strathclyde, UK
- Education: Glasgow School of Art
- Relatives: Peter Alexander (brother); Donald Alexander (nephew)

Ann Dunlop Alexander (16 March 1896 – 18 October 1969) was a Scottish painter, engraver and teacher based in Glasgow.

== Early life and education ==
Alexander was born on 16 March 1896 in Glasgow to Robert Alexander (1844–1900), a Head teacher, and Christina Cameron Alexander (née McDonald Munn; 1863–1949), a housewife and teacher. Alexander was the younger sister of the literary editor and Shakespearean scholar Peter Alexander, and the paternal niece of Thomas Alexander (1847–1933), a professor of civil engineering at Imperial College of Engineering and Trinity College Dublin.

Alexander attended Glasgow High School before studying art at the Glasgow School of Art from 1915 to 1919.

== Career ==
Alexander was an art teacher at Hillhead High School. She continued to live and work in Glasgow, and produced linoprints, woodcuts and black and white drawings. She also painted, illustrated books and decorated ceramics. She frequently chose literary subjects, particularly myths and legends, for her work which was clearly influenced by the style of the decorative work of other Glasgow artists, including Jessie M. King and Ann Macbeth. Despite a number of career breaks, between 1919 and 1966, Alexander was a regular exhibitor at both the Royal Scottish Academy and the Royal Glasgow Institute of the Fine Arts, showing some eleven pieces at the former and 19 at the latter.

== Personal life ==
Through her brother, Alexander was the paternal aunt of the physician and researcher Donald Alexander (1928–2007) and the literary scholar Nigel Alexander (1934–2005).

On 18 October 1969, Alexander died aged 73 in Glasgow.
