= Make*A*Circus =

American children's circus (1975–2002)

Origin
- Country: United States (based in San Francisco)
- Founder(s): Peter Frankham
- Year founded: 1975 (51 years ago)
- Defunct: 2002 (24 years ago)

Information
- Other information: Non-profit circus for and by children

Make*A*Circus was a professional, recreational, and educational circus that created free day-long events in which children observed a professional circus performance, took workshops in the circus skills of their choice, and finally performed their own circus.

It took place outdoors in parks, in primarily underserved neighborhoods in the San Francisco Bay Area, and all over the state of California, with 400 to 700 children per show. It lasted for twenty-five years, from 1975 to 2002.

== History ==
=== Background ===
Make*A*Circus began as a project of the Inter-Action theater program in London, created by community educator Edward David Berman in 1968. There, actor Peter Frankham collaborated with visual artist Liz Leyh on her concept of "council estate" children improvising a parade and circus-like performance. Using props and costumes from the company and settings in their neighborhood, children improvised characters and acts. Each performance was different.

In 1974, Frankham moved to San Francisco and, after a period of busking on the streets, received funding through the San Francisco Arts Commission's Neighborhood Arts Program to create art in the city's communities.

In 1975, the Neighborhood Arts Program became one of the first entities using the federal Carter-era Comprehensive Employment and Training Act (CETA) to offer employment to artists. Frankham received a monthly stipend.

His vision was to recreate the idea of a "circus with a purpose" that specifically targeted underprivileged children. The first circus was presented in 1975. Rehearsals were held at The Farm community center.

In 1976, Frankham was asked to take over an unused non-profit corporation, and both Make*A*Circus and the Talespinners, a theater company that included and performed for senior citizens, became part of Feedback Productions.

Make*A*Circus was collectively run. Frankham and a core of artists made all thematic, organizational and artistic decisions collaboratively. Members shared non-performance responsibilities, and met in planning sessions, evaluative meetings and a study group.

== A Day at the Circus ==
A Make*A*Circus day began with the company arriving in the morning and setting up bleachers, circus ring, mats, a backdrop and sideshow booths. At the same time, neighborhood groups arrived with the children they served.

Teen apprentices painted children's faces and ran games in the sideshow. The youth were affiliated with the San Francisco Summer Youth program, now the Mayor's Youth Employment and Education Program.

From 1975 to 1983, a parade was announced at noon, and children took a short walk around the neighborhood, convincing performers, placed along the pre-planned route, to join the show.

At 1:00 pm, the single-ring circus show began. It included jugglers, clowns, and acrobats, as well as skills such as stilts, slack-rope, fire-eating, balancing, trapeze, and unicycling. Clown performances functioned as a narrative through-line until, beginning in 1980, all acts were included in the narrative. The show was accompanied by a live brass band. Many of the performers and band members were professionals who were also concurrently involved with other arts organizations and projects of this time, including the Pickle Family Circus, and the San Francisco Mime Troupe.

At 2:00 pm, the children were invited to choose the circus-skill workshop of their choice. Workshops were offered in all the skills the children had just seen. The workshops lasted for thirty minutes, and included ten to thirty children.

At 3:00 pm, the second show was announced. This show starred the children and was accompanied by the band. Children performed as clowns, acrobats, jugglers, slack-rope walkers, stilt-walkers, animals, musicians, and more. Adult performers added support.

== Venues ==
=== San Francisco parks ===
Bay View Playground, Crocker-Amazon Recreation Center, Holly Park/ Bernal Heights, Father Boedecker Park/ The Tenderloin, Dolores Park, Glen Park, Golden Gate Park Sharon Meadows, Hamilton Park/ The Fillmore, Hunters Point Gym, Rossi Playground/ The Richmond, Sunset Recreation Center, Visitacion Valley Park, Washington Square Park, Youngblood Coleman Park/Bayview, Upper Noe Playground, Precita Park/Mission

=== San Francisco Bay Area ===
Alameda, Berkeley, Brisbane, Concord, Cupertino, Daly City, East Palo Alto, Hayward, Los Altos, Martinez, Millbrae, Newark, Novato, Pittsburg, Oakland, Redwood City, San Jose, San Mateo, Sausalito, South San Francisco, Sunnyvale

=== Central California ===
Bakersfield, Bishop, Delano, Dos Palos, Keyes, Livermore, Fairfield, Fresno, Los Altos, Los Banos, Mammoth Lakes, Merced, Modesto, Salinas, San Luis Obispo, Santa Cruz, Santa Maria, Seaside, Stockton, Visalia, Waterford, Watsonville

=== Southern California ===
Alhambra, Anaheim, Carlsbad, Covina, East Los Angeles, Fontana, Glendale, La Mesa, Lancaster, Long Beach, Los Angeles, Manhattan Beach, Paramount, Pasadena, Point Mogu, Pomona, Poway, Riverside, Rowland Heights, San Diego, Santa Barbara, Santa Maria, Torrance

=== Northern California ===
Auburn, Davis, Forks of Salmon, Alturas (Modoc County), Rio Linda, Sacramento, Willows

== Funding sources ==
Make*A*Circus received funding from a wide range of charitable foundations, corporations and local, state and federal government programs.

- Government programs included the California Arts Council, the National Endowment for the Arts, San Francisco Hotel Tax Fund and the San Francisco Recreation & Parks Department.
- Foundations included the Elise Haas Foundation, the Fred and Carl Gellert Foundation, Guy F. Atkinson Foundation, David and Lucille Packard Foundation, Levi Strauss Foundation, LJ Skaggs and Mary C. Scaggs Foundation, San Francisco Foundation, Morris Stulsaft Foundation, and the Zellerbach Foundation.
- Corporate sources included Arco, Chevron USA, Citicorp Savings Foundation, Clorox Company, IBM, Mervyn's Corporation, Rosenberg Capital Management Trust, Sears, Roebuck and Company, Shell Oil, Sohio Petroleum, Target Stores, and TRW Corporation.
