= Peter Alexander (Shakespearean scholar) =

Scottish literary scholar

Peter Alexander CBE, FBA
- Peter Alexander, by Walter Bird (1957)
- Born: 19 September 1893; Glasgow, Lanarkshire, UKGBI
- Died: 18 June 1969 (aged 75); Alexandria, Dunbartonshire, UK
- Occupations: Literary editor; Shakespearean scholar
- Spouse: Agnes Alexander (m. 1923)
- Children: 3, including Donald Alexander
- Relatives: Ann Dunlop Alexander (sister)

Academic background
- Education: University of Glasgow

Peter Alexander, CBE, FBA (19 September 1893 – 18 June 1969) was a Scottish literary editor, Shakespearean scholar and Regius Professor of English Language and Literature, known for The Alexander Text.

== Life ==
Alexander was born on 19 September 1893 in Glasgow to Robert Alexander (1844–1900), a Head teacher, and Christina Cameron Alexander (née McDonald Munn; 1863–1949), a housewife and teacher. Alexander's younger sister was the artist and teacher Ann Dunlop Alexander. Alexander was the paternal nephew of Thomas Alexander (1847–1933), a professor of civil engineering at Imperial College of Engineering and Trinity College Dublin.

Following the death of his father in 1900, Alexander's mother returned to teaching. He was educated at George Watson's College in Edinburgh, and Whitehill Senior Secondary School in Glasgow. He went to the University of Glasgow in 1911, where John Semple Smart was an influence.

In 1914, Alexander joined the army as a private in the Cameron Highlanders, then becoming an artillery officer. In 1918 after he returned to the University of Glasgow to finish his studies and graduated in 1920 with an MA degree.

Alexander was Regius Professor of English Language and Literature at the University of Glasgow and a noted Shakespearean scholar. His collected works of Shakespeare are known as "the Alexander text".

== Personal life ==
On 15 June 1923 Alexander married Agnes 'Nan' Effie Alexander (née Macdonald; 1895–1970). Together they had three children, including the physician and researcher Donald Alexander (1928–2007) and the literary scholar Nigel Alexander (1934–2005). Alexander's eldest son, Peter 'Sandy' Alexander (1924–1944), was killed serving in Second World War.

On 18 June 1969, Alexander died aged 75 of lung cancer in Alexandria, Dunbartonshire (present-day West Dunbartonshire.

== Selected publications ==
- Shakespeare (Home University Library of Modern Knowledge)
- Shakespeare's Life and Art, 1939.
- Hamlet: Father and Son, 1955.
- The Complete Works of Shakespeare: The Alexander Text

Academic offices
Preceded by William Macneile Dixon	Regius Professor of English Language and Literature, University of Glasgow; 1935–1963	Succeeded by Peter Herbert Butter
