= Harry Alexander =

Harry or Harold Alexander is the name of:

- Harry Alexander (rugby union) (1879–1915), England rugby union international
- Harold Alexander, 1st Earl Alexander of Tunis (1891–1969), British military commander and field marshal
- Harold Alexander (footballer) (1902–1964), Australian rules footballer for South Melbourne, also Town Clerk of South Melbourne
- Harry Alexander (cricketer) (1905–1993), Australian cricketer
- Harry Alexander (footballer) (born 1939), Australian rules footballer for South Melbourne
- Harold Alexander (American football) (born 1970), American football player
- Harold Alexander (Florida politician) (1900–1987), Florida politician

== See also ==
- Henry Alexander (disambiguation)
