= Lynching of Fred Alexander =

1901 lynching in Kansas, US

The lynching of Fred Alexander was committed by a mob in Leavenworth, Kansas, United States on January 15, 1901, after he was arrested for rape and murder. He was killed when he was burned alive while tied to a metal rail. The Democratic Party-allied newspaper had been fomenting fear of African Americans as libidinous sexual predators. Results of official investigations disputed whether there was a rape and only circumstantial evidence was used to blame him for the alleged crime. The lynching and its aftermath were widely covered in newspapers.

Alexander was a veteran of the Spanish–American War. He was accused of the rape and murder of 19-year-old Pearl Forbes. He was castrated during the lynching.

== See also ==
- False accusations of rape as justification for lynchings
