= Bob Alexander (ring announcer) =

American ring announcer

Bob Alexander (born September 4, 1963, in Detroit, Michigan) is a ring announcer for professional and amateur boxing, MMA, and kickboxing.

== Early life and education ==
Alexander was born in Detroit, Michigan and moved to Punta Gorda, Florida in 1973 at the age of 10. He graduated from Charlotte High school in 1981 and began his radio career in 1982. He received his Bachelor of Arts degree from the University of South Florida in May 1986.

== Career ==
Alexander's Ring Announcing career began in 1989 when he convinced a promoter to let him announce one rainy night on Sanibel Island, Florida. The fights were held on tennis courts that became flooded from the downpour. During the co-main event, the sound system went out and Alexander had to shout the introductions and results through cupped hands for the remainder of the night. "The place was full of drunks who were yelling and pelting me with beer cups," he says. "I figured this is as bad as it can get."

The fourth event he announced was broadcast nationwide, and included the eleventh professional fight of Bernard "The Executioner" Hopkins.

Since then, Bob has appeared on major networks such as Showtime, ESPN, Fox Sports Net, HDNet, Sun Sports, MSG, and Pay Per View.

He has announced dozens of World Championship Fights at top locales including Madison Square Garden (New York), Boardwalk Hall (Atlantic City), Buffalo Bills (Las Vegas), The Tabernacle (Atlanta, Ga.), Mohegan Sun (Uncasville, Ct.) Hard Rock Live (Hollywood, FL.) Turning Stone (Verona, NY) and served as the Ring Announcer for the popular "Boxing in Paradise" series, St Thomas, USVI.

Currently, Bob is working as the ring announcer for Iron Mike Productions, a company formed by former heavyweight champion of the world, Mike Tyson and businessman Garry Jonas.

== Notable events ==
Alexander announced the first fight ever broadcast on the internet and was an announcer for the first ever Pro Boxing Event in Dubai, UAE.

Early shows in his career featured Ronald "Winky" Wright and Christy Martin (boxer)

Alexander has also worked as television commentator with notables such as "The Colonel" Bob Sheridan and James "Smitty" Smith.

Alexander was the Master of Ceremonies for the inaugural Florida Boxing Hall of Fame, 2009.

Alexander is a member of the 2010 Class of Inductees for the Florida Boxing Hall of Fame, along with Muhammad Ali, Barbara Buttrick, Don King, James “Smitty” Smith and others.

In early 2014, Alexander was voted in to serve on the Florida Boxing Hall of Fame board of directors as its media representative.
