= Alexander, Georgia =

Unincorporated community in Georgia, U.S.

Coordinates: 33°01′20″N 81°52′36″W

Alexander is an unincorporated community in Burke County, in the U.S. state of Georgia.

== History ==
A post office called Alexander was established in 1847, and remained in operation until 1966. The community was named after Hugh Alexander, a pioneer settler. Alexander was an incorporated municipality from 1851 until 1995.
