= Sally Hobart Alexander =

American writer of children's literature

- Born: Owensboro, Kentucky
- Education: Bucknell University; University of Pittsburgh
- Occupation: Writer
- Awards: Christopher Award (1995)

Sally Hobart Alexander is an American writer of children's literature. She is best known for her books about her experiences as a blind person.

== Early life and education ==
Sally Hobart was born in Owensboro, Kentucky, the daughter of Robert Hobart and Kate Hobart. She graduated from Hazelton High School, and Bucknell University. She earned a master's degree in social work at the University of Pittsburgh.

== Career ==
After her undergraduate degree, Alexander taught third-grade students in Southern California, when a rare disease caused blood vessels in her retina to break, which eventually led to total blindness. She told Contemporary Authors, "I was unhappy to leave that last year [of my teaching], when my visual difficulties began. I entered an excellent training program in Pittsburgh, Pennsylvania for newly blinded adults. For a year afterward, I taught at the Greater Pittsburgh Guild for the Blind."

Alexander embarked on a writing career in children's fiction with the publication of her first book, Mom Can't See Me (1990), in which Alexander depicts a loving family that has learned to cope with having a blind parent. She has published eight titles as of 2008, including two memoirs, Taking Hold (1994) and On My Own (1997), and a young readers' biography of Laura Bridgman.

Alexander teaches literature and writing in the Chatham University Master of Fine Arts Program in Children's and Adolescent Writing. She received the 1995 Christopher Award for Taking Hold: My Journey into Blindness.

== Personal life ==
Sally Hobart married Bob Alexander, an English professor. They have two children and live in the Squirrel Hill neighborhood of Pittsburgh. In recent years, she has developed hearing loss, and wears hearing aids. "Although I don't minimize the challenges of my deaf-blindness," she wrote in 2010, "I do believe that were I to lose all my hearing, I would still find meaning and joy in reading and writing books."

== Books ==
- Mom Can't See Me, children's semi-autobiographical (New York: Macmillan, 1990).
- Sarah's Surprise, fiction (New York: Macmillan, 1990).
- Mom's Best Friend, children's semi-autobiographical (New York: Macmillan, 1992).
- Maggie's Whopper, fiction (New York: Macmillan, 1992).
- Taking Hold: My Journey into Blindness , nonfiction autobiographical (New York: Macmillan, 1994).
- On My Own: The Journey Continues, nonfiction autobiographical (New York: Farrar, Straus and Giroux, 1997).
- Do You Remember the Color Blue? And Other Questions Kids Ask about Blindness, nonfiction (New York: Viking, 2000).
- She Touched the World: Laura Bridgman, Deaf-Blind Pioneer, (co-author with Robert Alexander) nonfiction (New York: Clarion Books, 2008).
