= Robert Alexander (photographer) =

Photographer

- Born: 21 November 1943; Brooklyn, New York, U.S.
- Died: 8 October 1989 (aged 45); New York
- Occupation: Photographer
- Known for: Dance and City Photography

Robert Alexander was born in Brooklyn, New York, United States, on the November 21, 1943. He spent most of his early life there, eventually working as a freelance photographer and photographer's assistant from various addresses, including Remsen Street in the downtown area of the city. Alexander studied Art History at the University of Pennsylvania from 1961 to 1965 (but did not graduate), and conducted brief stints at both the New School for Social Research (film production) and the School of Visual Arts (16mm film editing). By the early seventies, Alexander had moved to Manhattan and had begun his work as a freelance photographer; although he continued to assist other photographers for several years. He also worked as a commercial photographer, contributing to catalogues and advertising for jewelry and clothing manufacturers.

== Career ==
Alexander's early portfolio work is at first tentatively formalist, but he quickly develops a strongly realist approach to subjects. He moves from photographing everyday, domestic objects to photographing people and street scenes. Though he retained his interest in still life photography all through his photographic career, sometimes photographing single objects in obsessive detail, it is as an observer of people in motion and interacting with a changing environment that Alexander is at his best. His photographs of New York streets, people, and architecture have that combination of intense engagement with and detachment from subjects that characterizes the work of many renowned documentary artists of modern city life. Alexander's slides and prints of New York City during the seventies and eighties are a lively record of a city undergoing intense change and they reveal a fascination both with the ordinariness of city life and the grandeur and strangeness of the city itself. He undertook several personal projects, photographing New York cabs and shop mannequins, and, over several years, scenes of the street from his apartment on 29th street. He also documented the building of the West Side Highway and took hundreds of slides of the Manhattan skyline.

=== Finding his direction ===
Alexander's first resumes indicate that by the early seventies he had begun to think of himself as specializing in performance photography. His work had started to appear in various publications associated with the arts and he had collaborated with Sally Banes on the book: Terpsichore in Sneakers. His black and white photographs are given a special place in the book, accompanying individual chapters and also comprising a separate section at the end of the text. The spare, often stark simplicity of the photography suggests that Alexander had understood the tension between the singularity of the dancer's body and its sometimes violent, sometimes playful interaction with other bodies and objects. The choreographers and dancers he photographed for the book and for other publications had inherited a strong dance vocabulary from the avant-garde performers and choreographers of the fifties and sixties, but they were constantly seeking to break free of some of the constraints imposed upon modern dance by that vocabulary. These attempts to redefine movement and dance are perhaps best exemplified by the development of Contact Improvisation, with its mixture of randomness, spontaneity, and carefully focused give and take between dancers.

Alexander frequently photographed Steve Paxton, who was instrumental in the development of this form, as well as the other choreographers and dancers of the collaborative group Grand Union. His photographs of them are of performers who seem at times restrained and poised and at times utterly abandoned to movement and to contact with other dancers. His strongest street photographs share this quality with his dance pictures. He seems drawn to the vulnerability of bodies in a dynamic environment, and his work conveys something of the dancer's desire both to control spaces and to be abandoned to them.

=== Famous subjects ===
While Alexander did not achieve the broad recognition of some of his contemporaries such as Peter Moore, his work is an important contribution to the documentation of experimental dance and performance of the seventies and eighties. He photographed most of the major experimental choreographers, dancers, and performers of the period, including Stuart Sherman, Kenneth King, Simone Forti, David Gordon, Valda Setterfield, Laura Foreman, Carter Frank, Yvonne Rainer, Steve Paxton, Douglass Dunn, Rudy Perez, Meredith Monk, Trisha Brown, Lucinda Childs and many others. He also photographed musicians and actors, such as the then emerging Tom Waits and the already famous Peter Ustinov.

By the mid-eighties Alexander was doing less and less dance photography and more photography of the city. The collection includes thousands of slides of Manhattan dating from this period, many of which reveal Alexander's interest in ordinary street scenes and people. Most, however, are of the city's skyline and monolithic architecture, testifying to the photographer's obsession with the city that he lived in all of his life and which he left only briefly as a young man. Alexander died on the 8th of October, 1989.
