= Henry Alexander (cricketer) =

English cricketer (1841–1920)

Personal information
- Full name: Henry Robert Tayler Alexander
- Born: 26 October 1841; Brighton, Sussex, England
- Died: 11 February 1920 (aged 78); Westminster, London, England
- Batting: Unknown
- Bowling: Unknown

Domestic team information
- Years: Team
- 1863: Cambridge University

Career statistics
Competition	First-class
Matches	1
Runs scored	2
Batting average	2.00
100s/50s	–/–
Top score	2
Balls bowled	20
Wickets	1
Bowling average	14.00
5 wickets in innings	–
10 wickets in match	–
Best bowling	1/14
Catches/stumpings	–/–
- Source: Cricinfo, 2 November 2013

Henry Robert Tayler Alexander (26 October 1841 – 11 February 1920) was an English first-class cricketer. Alexander's batting and bowling styles are unknown. He was born at Brighton, Sussex.

Alexander was educated at Harrow School where he captained the school cricket team in 1861. Later that year he began his university studies at Trinity College, Cambridge. Two years later he made a single appearance in first-class cricket for Cambridge University against the Marylebone Cricket Club (MCC) at Fenner's. In a match which the MCC won by an innings and 6 runs, Alexander ended Cambridge University's first-innings not out without scoring, while in the MCC first-innings he took the wicket of Charles Lyttelton to finish with figures of 1/14 from five overs. He was last man out in Cambridge University's second-innings, scoring 3 runs before he was dismissed by George Wootton.

He later became a solicitor. He died at Westminster, London on 11 February 1920.
