= Alexander's (disambiguation) =

Alexander's is a real estate investment trust and former department store company.

Alexander's or Alexanders may also refer to:

- Alexanders, Smyrnium olusatrum, a flowering plant
- Alexanders (Boise, Idaho), a men's clothing store
- "Alexander's Ragtime Band", a 1911 song by Irving Berlin
- Alexander's Ragtime Band (film), a 1938 film based around the song
- Brantford Alexanders, a hockey team
