= Fred Alexander (editor) =

New Zealand subeditor, poetry anthologist and newspaper editor

William Frederick Alexander (20 July 1882 – 14 August 1957) was a New Zealand subeditor, poetry anthologist and newspaper editor. He was born in Little River, North Canterbury, New Zealand on 20 July 1882.
