= Jay Alexander =

American magician and comedian

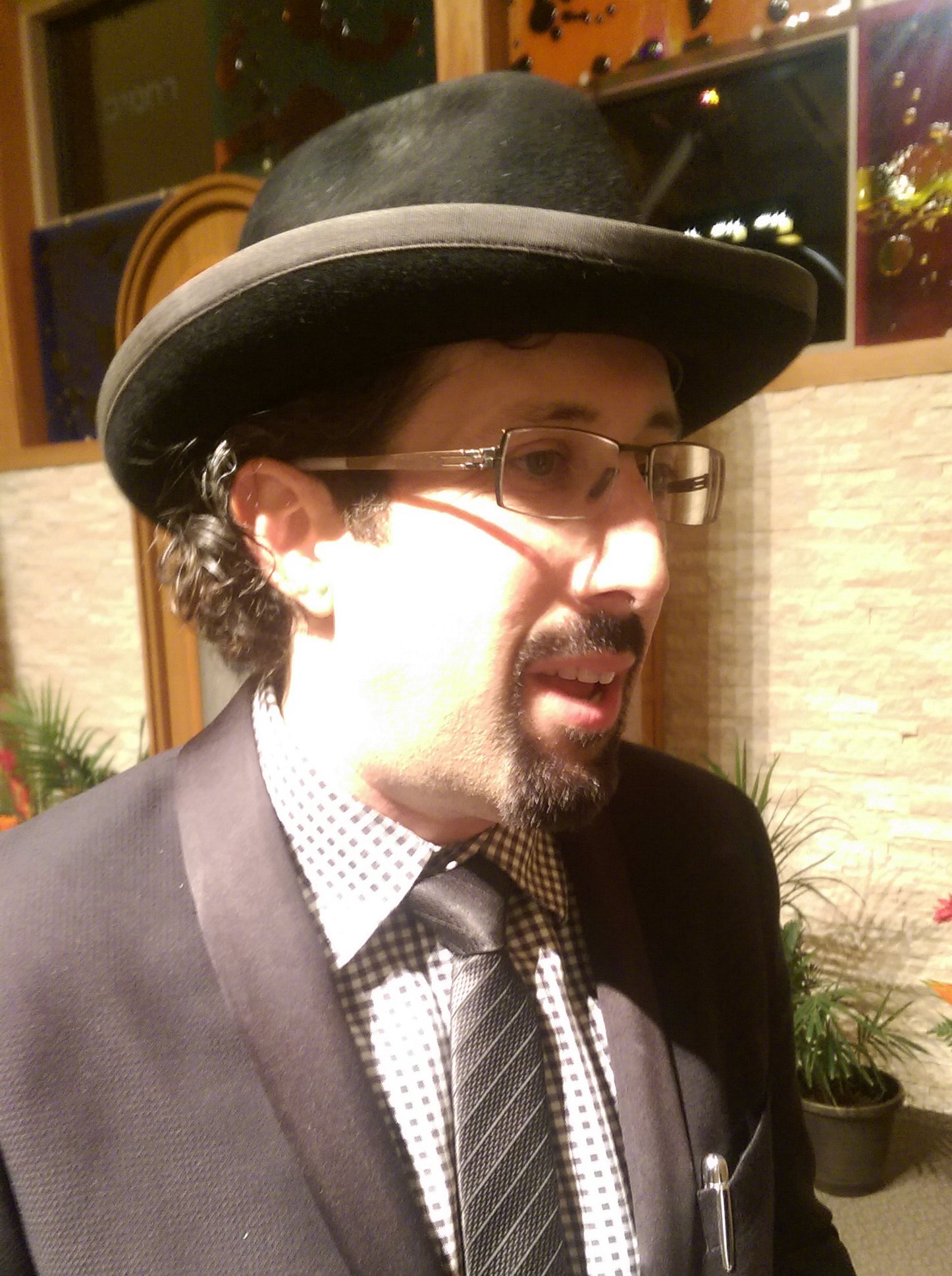
- Alexander in 2014
- Born: Houston, Texas, U.S.
- Occupations: Magician, comedian
- Website: jayalexander.com

Jay Alexander is an American magician and comedian known as a corporate and society entertainer.

== Early life and education ==
Alexander was born in Houston, Texas. At the age of fourteen, he was the youngest recipient of the Society of American Magicians' Gold Medal of Honor. He attended Westbury High School then the High School for the Performing and Visual Arts in Houston.

After high school, Alexander moved to San Francisco to attend the San Francisco Art Institute.

== Career ==
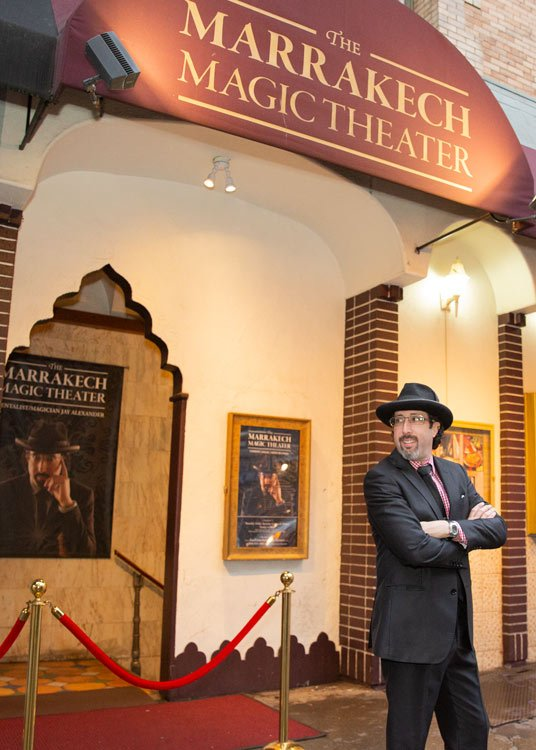

Alexander is the co-author of several magic books. He is also the presenter of Learn the Art of Magic, a CD-ROM that introduces 26 different magic tricks.

His clients have included Robin Williams, Steve Wozniak and the Rolling Stones.

Alexander directed the children's DVD "Here Comes Boswick the Clown with Phoebe the Duck!", produced by David Magidson.

He has appeared on The Today Show, Good Morning America and MTV, and also on many local morning shows.

In the San Francisco Chronicle, David Lazarus wrote, "One of the highest-paid, and busiest, performers on the Bay Area corporate circuit is magician Jay Alexander . . ."
