= Alexander River (Western Australia) =

River in Western Australia

Coordinates: 33°52′35″S 122°46′6″E

Location
- Country: Australia

Physical characteristics
- Source
  - elevation: 38 metres (125 ft)
- Mouth
  - location: Alexander Bay
  - elevation: sea level
- Length: 10 km (6.2 mi)

The Alexander River is a river in the Goldfields-Esperance region of Western Australia.

The river rises near Munliginup Hill and flows southerly through a nature reserve area before discharging into Alexander Bay and the Southern Ocean about 75 kilometres (47 mi) east of Esperance.

The river was named in 1870 by John Forrest, who was surveying the area at the time. He named the river after his brother, Alexander Forrest, who was also a surveyor and who later became the Lord Mayor of Perth, Western Australia.
