= Albert R. Alexander =

American judge

Albert R. Alexander (November 8, 1859 – 1966) was a Canadian-born American judge from Plattsburg, Missouri, who became the world's oldest serving judge and the world's longest serving judge. He retired on July 9, 1965, at the age of 105 years and 8 months.

Alexander also worked as a farmer, a teacher, a newspaper publisher, and a lawyer. From 1901 until 1916, he was the owner and publisher of the Plattsburg Leader. In 1914, President Woodrow Wilson appointed him Postmaster for Plattsburg where he served until 1927. In 1950, he was elected to the office of Magistrate and Probate Judge of Clinton County, Missouri.

Judge Wesley E. Brown holds the record as the oldest practicing federal judge while Judge Joseph William Woodrough, who was on the Eighth Circuit until 1977, also lived to the age of 104.
