= Upper Grey River =

Coordinates: 42°27′S 172°00′E

Location
- Country: New Zealand

Physical characteristics
- Source
  - location: Southern Alps
- Mouth
  - location: Grey River

The Upper Grey River is a river of the West Coast Region of New Zealand's South Island. As the name suggests, it is a stretch of the Grey River, and the name is used for the section between the confluence of the Blue Grey River, Brown Grey River, and Crooked Mary Creek in the Southern Alps and the Upper Grey's confluence with the Little Grey River 25 kilometres southwest of Reefton.

== See also ==
- List of rivers of New Zealand
