= Alexander Lake (southcentral Alaska) =

Lake in Alaska, United States

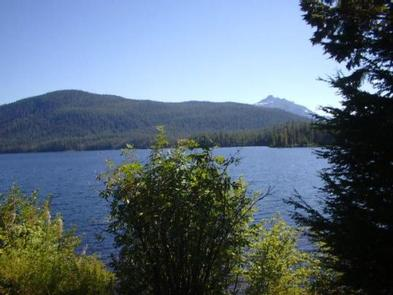
- Location of Alexander Lake in Alaska

- Location within Alaska Location within North America
- Location: Matanuska-Susitna Borough, Alaska
- Coordinates: 61°44′57″N 150°54′11″W
- Primary outflows: Alexander Creek (Susitna River)
- Basin countries: United States
- Max. length: 2.5 miles (4.0 km)
- Surface elevation: 138 feet (42 m)

Alexander Lake is a lake in South Central Alaska, located at head of Alexander Creek (Susitna River), 46 miles (74 km) North of Tyonek, Alaska on Cook Inlet Low.

== Hydrology ==
Alexander Creek (Susitna River) in turn drains into Cook Inlet on the Pacific Ocean.

== Natural history ==
According to the Alaska Department of Fish and Game, Alexander Lake is known by Alaskan Natives for its tree squirrel population, calling it "Deldida Bena", (Tree Squirrel Lake).

== History ==
Alexander Lake reported in 1926 by Capps (1935, pl. 1), United States Geological Survey.

=== Name ===
Probably derived from Alexander Creek (Susitna River) which drains the lake.

Alexander Lake is also known as Deldida Bena ("Tree Squirrel Lake") by Alaska Natives.

== See also ==
- List of lakes of Alaska
