= The Alexander Brothers =

Scottish traditional music duo

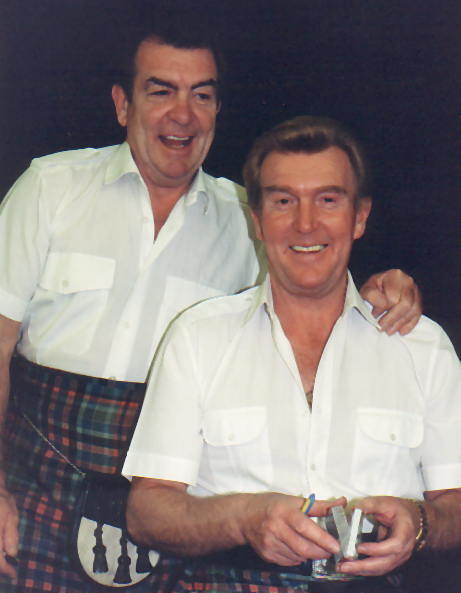
- The Alexander Brothers on tour in Lethbridge, Alberta, Canada, in the 1990s

Background information
- Origin: Scotland
- Genres: Folk music, country and western
- Years active: 1950–2012
- Label: Pye Records
- Members: Tom Alexander; Jack Alexander

The Alexander Brothers were an easy-listening folk-music duo from Scotland, who had a long career beginning in the 1950s.

== Career ==
Thomas Armit "Tom" Alexander (25 June 1934 – 9 January 2020) and John "Jack" Armit Alexander (11 November 1935 – 2 November 2013) were born in Cambusnethan, near Wishaw. Encouraged by their musical mother, they started instrument lessons at an early age, with Tom favouring the accordion and Jack the piano. On leaving school in the early 1950s, the brothers pursued a trade as painters and decorators by day, and entertainers by night, and spent most of their spare time performing for elderly people in hospitals and for various charitable institutions in and around their hometown. In the spring of 1958, they entered a talent contest which was held in their local cinema. They easily won the contest and one of the judges (who was a well known Scottish theatrical agent) was so impressed, he placed the boys under contract that summer. They made their professional debut at the Webster Hall, Arbroath. It was during this season that they received their first long term contract for five winter seasons at Glasgow's Metropole Theatre. Following Arbroath they were engaged to appear at the Metropolitan Theatre, Edgware Road, London, and it was during this season they were spotted and signed to Pye Records. They cut their first LP six weeks later.

Their most popular recording was "Nobody's Child" in 1964, which is said to have "sold more than The Beatles in Scotland". Their other popular songs include "These Are My Mountains", "The Northern Lights of Old Aberdeen", "Bonnie Wee Jeannie McColl", and "Two Highland Lads". Their 1966 album, These Are My Mountains was their only chart success, peaking at #29 in the UK Albums Chart. Though their popularity had peaked, the duo enjoyed a long touring career. They toured Canada, the United States, Australia and New Zealand. They appeared at the Sydney Opera House with Jimmy Shand as a guest, and also played in Carnegie Hall in New York City. A famous fan was Charlton Heston, who regularly saw them in Los Angeles. In the mid 1990s, The Alexander Brothers began to release music videos, and later DVDs, to supplement their live performances. These new recordings contained many religious or devotional songs. Their most recent CDs and DVDs were produced by Bill Garden and Dougie Stevenson of the Kilsyth based company Scotdisc.

In recognition of their contributions to the world of music, they received MBEs from the Queen in the 2005 New Year Honours List. The ceremony took place in Holyrood Palace in Edinburgh.

On 2 November 2013, Jack died aged 77. Tom continued to occasionally perform as a solo act. Tom died on 9 January 2020 aged 85.
