= Alexander Creek (Susitna River tributary) =

River in Alaska, United States

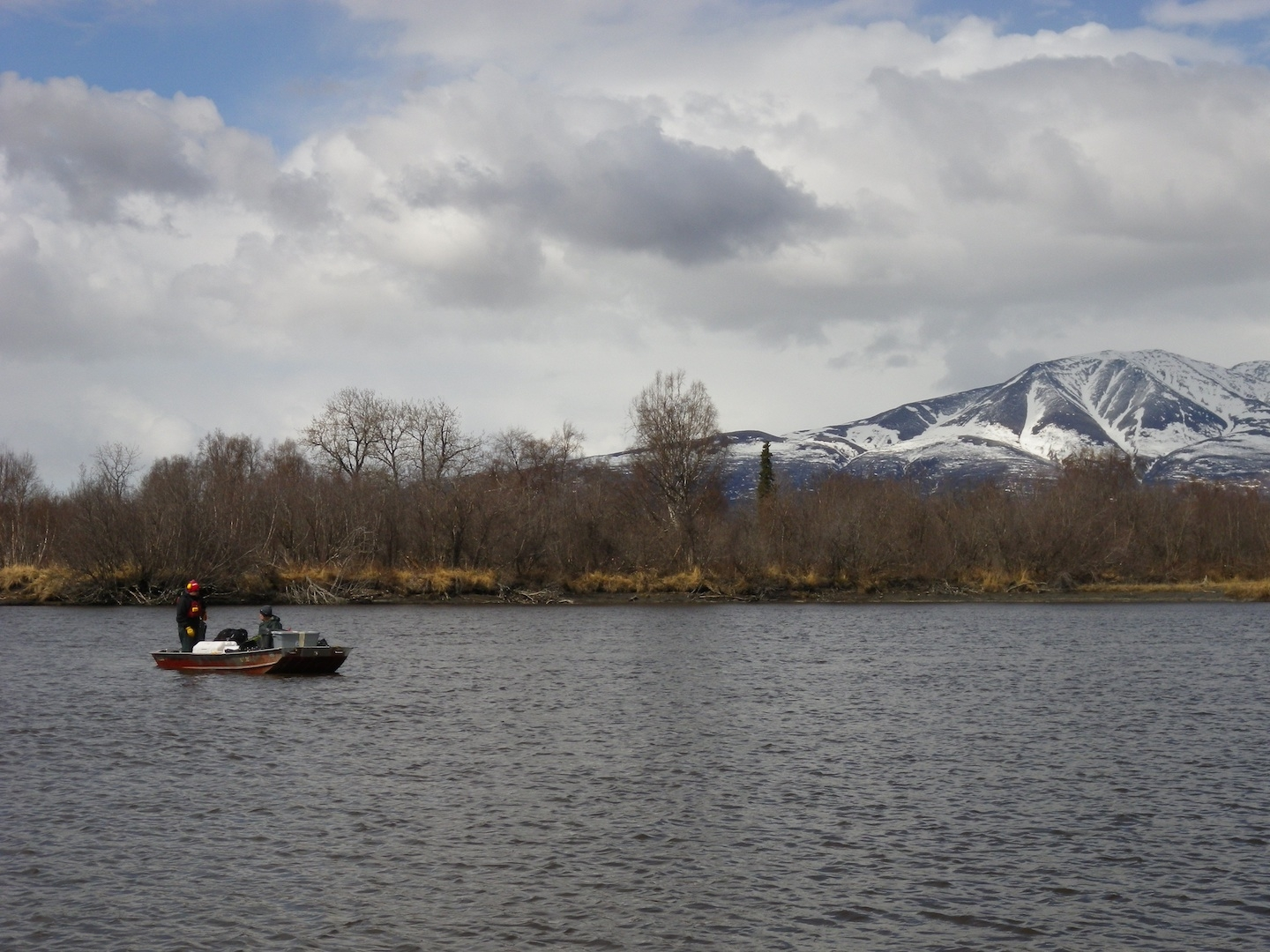
- Alexander Creek (Susitna River) in Matanuska-Susitna Borough, Alaska

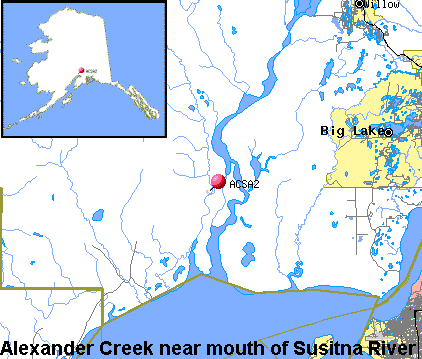
- Map showing where Alexander Creek meets the big Susitna River
- Native name: Taguntna

Location
- Country: United States

Physical characteristics
- Source
  - location: 61°43′53″N 150°52′17″W; Alexander Lake (southcentral Alaska), Matanuska-Susitna Borough, Alaska
  - elevation: 138 ft (42 m)
- Mouth
  - location: 61°24′46″N 150°35′51″W; Cook Inlet of Pacific Ocean
  - elevation: 26 ft (7.9 m)
- Length: 35 mi (56 km)
- Basin size: 0 sq mi (0 km^{2})
- Discharge
  - average: 0 cu ft/s (0 m^{3}/s)

Alexander Creek, also known as Taguntna Creek, is a 35 miles (56 km) long stream from Alexander Lake which merges with the big Susitna River near the village of Alexander Creek, Alaska also known as Alexander, Alaska, an Alaska Native and Alaska Bush community, in Matanuska-Susitna Borough, Alaska.

== Watershed ==
Alexander Creek is considered a (Wild; and Scenic, Recreation, Fish, Wildlife, and Cultural) river by the National Park Service

== History ==
Alexander Creek was reported in 1898 by Eldridge (1900, p. 10), United States Geological Survey. Alexander Creek was also known as Taguntna Creek, and Tuqentnu ("Clearwater Creek")

== Economy ==
Popular river for anglers, particularly for king salmon and coho salmon. The upper reaches are scenic, with views of the Alaska Range. Class I water encourages high use by beginning floaters. The lower reaches contain native archaeological sites, historic roadhouses, and the Iditarod Trail.

== Lists ==
=== Tributaries ===
From mouth going upstream to the source:

- Lower Sucker Creek 61°36′18″N 150°39′35″W, elevation: 112 feet (34 m)
  - Sucker Lake 61°39′20″N 150°54′14″W, elevation: 203 feet (62 m)

  - Upper Sucker Creek 61°39′15″N 150°54′26″W, elevation: 203 feet (62 m)

      - Lake 61°34′44″N 151°1′22″W
- Alexander Lake

== See also ==
- List of rivers of Alaska
