= Thomas Alexander (military surgeon) =

British military surgeon (1812–1860)

Thomas Alexander (born Prestonpans 6 May 1812, died London 1 February 1860) was a military surgeon in the British Army who rose to the position of Director General of the Army Medical Department.

== Early career ==
Alexander joined the Army in 1834 with his first posting to the West Indies where he spent five and a half years. He returned to the United Kingdom to be in charge of invalids but after nine months he was sent to the Nova Scotia where he remained until August 1846 to take up the post of Regimental-Assistant-Surgeon to the Rifle Brigade. In 1851 he was posted to the Cape of Good Hope to serve with the 60th Rifles in the Xhosa War of 1850-53, he acted as principal medical officer of Imperial forces' expedition sent beyond the Kei, and his commanders expressed their gratitude in general orders for his services during the war.

== The Crimean War ==
Alexander achieved the rank of First Class Staff Surgeon in 1854 and was ordered to join an expedition to Turkey where he was in charge of the medical officers of the Light Division under Sir George Brown, landing at Gallipoli on 6 March as part of the first detachment of the expeditionary force, comprising his former comrades in the Rifle Brigade and a detachment of Royal Engineers, Sappers and Miners. He remained with the Light Division throughout the Crimean War. He served as a surgeon at the Battle of Alma and at the Battle of Inkerman. Lord Raglan described Alexander "as deserving to be most honourably mentioned" in his despatches. He remained at his post throughout the winter of 1851-52 and it was noted that throughout this service with the Light Division in the Crimea, he did not have a single day where he was absent from duty. In January 1855 he was appointed Deputy-Inspector-General, and was principal medical officer of the expeditionary force under Sir George Brown that attacked Kerch. General Codrington mentioned Alexander in his despatch of 18 March 1856, additionally he was mentioned in a response to an address from the House of Commons and he was also recommended by Dr Andrew Smith for promotion to the rank of Local-Inspector-General for service during the Crimean War.

== After the Crimean War ==
Alexander was at home for less than two months when he received orders to go to Canada as principal medical officer. However, he was there for only six months before Lord Panmure nominated him to be a Royal Commissioner on the inquiry into the sanitary state of the army, and he returned to the United Kingdom to fulfil this role. He was also asked draw up a new regulations covering the management of barracks and hospitals. When Sir Andrew Smith retired on the 22 June 1858, he was appointed to the post of Director-General of the Army Medical Department. He was also appointed as one of the Honorary Surgeons to Her Majesty and a Companion of the Bath. He died in his home in Norfolk Square, London, on 1 February 1860 from complications of gout and was interred in his home town of Prestonpans. Among his obituarists was Florence Nightingale who wrote in The Lancet.

== Memorial ==
The British Army Medical Department's Committee of the Alexander Memorial Fund offered a triennial prize consisting of a gold medal, together with £50, for a best essay on a topic chosen by the Committee. The prize competition was open to executive officers of the Royal Army Medical Corps on full pay, with the exception of professors and assistant professors during their appointments at the Royal Army Medical College.

The town of Prestonpans ordered the erection of a memorial statute to Dr Alexander which sits in the town's Coronation Gardens to the north of its Preston Kirk.

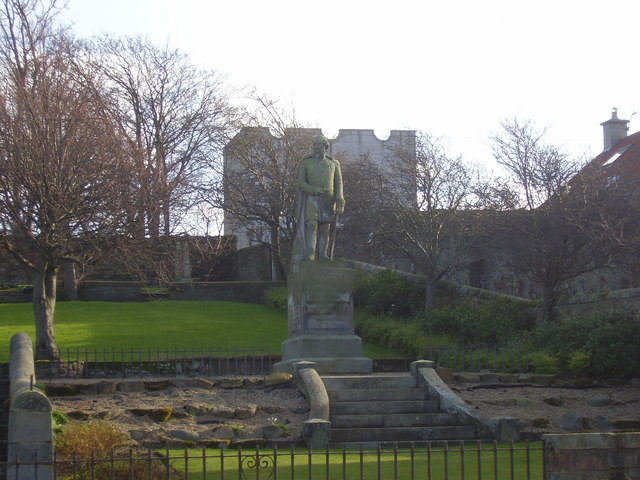
Prestonpans, East Lothian - Thomas Alexander C.B.
