= Shannon Alexander =

- Born: Australia
- Occupation(s): Director, producer

Shannon Alexander is an Australian-American filmmaker.

== Biography ==
In 2017 Alexander released The Misguided, which marked his feature film directorial debut. He released a documentary, Sex, Love, Misery: New New York, which looks at how the COVID-19 pandemic impacted dating in New York City. A second documentary, It's Coming, was released in 2023 and centered upon a mother who believes that she has been the center of supernatural activity since she was a child.

== Filmography ==
Year	Film	Director	Producer	Editor	Notes
2012	Richard Calling	Yes	Yes	Yes	Short film
2017	A Fine Stash	Yes	Yes	Yes	Short film
2017	The Misguided	Yes	Yes	Yes	Feature film directorial debut
2020	Be Still	Yes	Yes	Yes	Short film
2022	Sex, Love, Misery: New New York	Yes	Yes	No	
2022	It's Coming	Yes	Yes	Yes	
