= Frank Alexander (cricketer) =

Australian cricketer

Personal information
- Full name: Francis James Alexander
- Born: 15 April 1911; Perth, Western Australia
- Died: 19 June 2005 (aged 94); Perth, Western Australia
- Batting: Right-handed
- Bowling: Right-arm leg spin
- Role: Batsman

Domestic team information
- Years: Team
- 1931/32–1937/38: Western Australia
- First-class debut: 19 March 1932 Western Australia v South Africans
- Last First-class: 18 March 1938 Western Australia v Australian XI

Career statistics
Competition	First-class
Matches	13
Runs scored	391
Batting average	16.29
100s/50s	0/0
Top score	48
Balls bowled	64
Wickets	0
Bowling average	–
5 wickets in innings	–
10 wickets in match	–
Best bowling	–
Catches/stumpings	4/–
- Source: CricketArchive, 14 November 2011

Francis James Alexander (15 April 1911 – 19 June 2005) was an Australian cricketer. He appeared in 13 first-class matches for Western Australia between 1932 and 1938, scoring 391 at an average of 16.29, with a highest score of 48.
