= William Alexander =

William or Bill Alexander may refer to:

== Literature ==
- William Alexander (poet) (1808–1875), American poet and author
- William Alexander (journalist and author) (1826–1894), Scottish journalist and author
- William Alexander (author) (born 1976), American children's writer
- William Alexander, Baron Alexander of Potterhill (1905–1993), English educator and author
- Fred Alexander (editor) (William Frederick Alexander, 1882–1957), New Zealand subeditor, poetry anthologist and newspaper editor
- William Menzies Alexander (1858–1929), Scottish medical and theological writer

== Military ==
- William Alexander (Canadian soldier) (1880–1917), World War I soldier executed for desertion
- William Melville Alexander (aviator) (1897–1988), Canadian World War I flying ace
- William Alexander, Lord Stirling (1726–1783), American Revolutionary War soldier

== Politics ==
- Bill Alexander (British politician) (1910–2000), British communist activist, commander of the International Brigade's British Battalion
- William Alexander (died 1446), MP for Salisbury and Wiltshire
- William Alexander (Australian politician) (1844–1924), member of the Western Australian Legislative Council
- William Alexander (Lord Provost) (1690–1761), MP for Edinburgh and Lord Provost of Edinburgh 1754–1756
- William Alexander (Glasgow MP) (1874–1954), MP for Glasgow Central
- Bill Alexander (American politician) (born 1934), American politician; former US representative from Arkansas
- William B. Alexander (1921–2006), member of the Mississippi State Senate
- Willem-Alexander of the Netherlands (born 1967), King of the Netherlands
- William Melville Alexander (Illinois politician), speaker of the Illinois House of Representatives
- William Alexander (Illinois politician), member of the Illinois House of Representatives
- William Lee Alexander, American politician, Oklahoma State Treasurer

== Religion ==
- William Alexander (Quaker) (1768–1841) English Quaker and publisher
- William Alexander (bishop) (1824–1911), Anglican bishop, Primate of All Ireland
- William Lindsay Alexander (1808–1884), Scottish church leader
- William Patterson Alexander (1805–1884), American missionary in Hawaii

== Sports ==
- William Alexander (American football) (1889–1950), football coach at Georgia Tech
- Bill Alexander (Canadian football) (1924–1997), Canadian football halfback
- William Alexander (rugby union, born 1874) (1874–1937), Wales international rugby union player
- William Alexander (rugby union, born 1905) (1905–?), English rugby union player

== Visual arts ==
- Bill Alexander (painter) (1915–1997), East-Prussian artist, star of The Magic of Oil Painting
- William Alexander (painter) (1767–1816), British artist
- William Walker Alexander (1870–1948), Canadian printmaker and bookplate maker

== Others ==
- Bill Alexander (engineer) (William Hector, 1927–1995), British avionics engineer
- William Alexander, 1st Earl of Stirling (c. 1567–1640), British colonial organizer
- William Alexander (the younger) (c. 1602–1638), founder of the colony at Port Royal; son of the 1st Earl of Stirling
- William Alexander (judge) (c. 1754–1842), Lord Chief Baron of the Exchequer
- Sir William Alexander, 3rd Baronet (1797–1873), Attorney-General of the Duchy of Cornwall
- William Alexander (insurance writer) (1848–1937), cofounder of Pi Kappa Alpha Fraternity
- William Cowper Alexander (1806–1874), president of the New Jersey State Senate and president of the Equitable Life Assurance Society
- William D. Alexander (1916–1991), American film producer
- William DeWitt Alexander (1833–1913), educator in Hawaii
- William Hastings Alexander (c. 1823–1876), Hong Kong judiciary officer
- Bill Alexander (director) (born 1948), American theatre director
- William Alexander (architect) (1841–1904), Scottish architect
- William Alexander (Hollyoaks), a fictional character in British soap opera Hollyoaks

== See also ==
- Willie Alexander (born 1943), American singer
- Willie Alexander (American football) (born 1949), former professional American football player
- Will Alexander (disambiguation)
- Alexander Williams (disambiguation)
