= Will Alexander =

Will Alexander may refer to:

- Will W. Alexander (1884–1956), first president of Dillard University
- Will Alexander (poet) (born 1948), American poet

== See also ==
- Willie Alexander (born 1943), American singer
- Willie Alexander (American football) (born 1949), former professional American football player
- William Alexander (disambiguation)
- Alexander (disambiguation)
- Will (disambiguation)
