= Tammer Bany =

Jordanian footballer (born 2003)

Tamer Bani Odeh تامر بني عودة
Personal information
- Full name: Tamer Jehad Abdallah Bani Odeh
- Date of birth: 19 October 2003 (age 23)
- Place of birth: Copenhagen, Denmark
- Height: 1.81 m (5 ft 11 in)
- Position: Forward

Team information
- Current team: West Bromwich Albion
- Number: 23

Youth career
- –2019: Vanløse IF
- 2019–2021: B93
- 2025–: West Bromwich Albion

Senior career*
Years	Team	Apps	(Gls)
2021–2024	B93	61	(13)
2024–2025	Randers	23	(2)
2025–	West Bromwich Albion	10	(0)

International career^{‡}
2025–	Jordan	3	(0)
- * Club domestic league appearances and goals as of 31 August 2026 ‡ National team caps and goals as of 6 October 2026

Tamer Jehad Abdallah Bani Odeh (Arabic: تامر جهاد عبد الله بني عودة) is a professional footballer who plays as a forward for EFL Championship club West Bromwich Albion. Born in Denmark, he represents the Jordan national team.

== Career ==
Tamer began his career in Denmark with B93 in 2020, before moving to Randers in February 2024. He made 24 appearances for the club, scoring twice. On February 3, 2025, Tamer signed for EFL Championship club West Bromwich Albion for an estimated £3.3M fee. This was a record signing for the Danish club. Tamer had also been pursued by Celtic F.C.

He played his first game for the English side on February 22, 2025, against Oxford United, in a 2–0 home victory for the Albion. He recorded an assist on the second goal.

== International career ==
Eligible to play for Denmark, Palestine, and Jordan, Tamer accepted a call-up to the Jordan national team to participate in a set of friendly matches against Tunisia and Mali on 14 and 18 November 2025; respectively. He made his debut for the national team on 18 November against Mali, playing a total of seventy minutes.

== Personal life ==
Tamer was born in Denmark. In an interview with Al Ghad, he mentioned his mother's side living in Amman, while his father's side lives in As-Salt, frequently visiting both sides of the family. He also mentioned that he only holds Jordanian citizenship.

== Statistics ==
As of match played 3 November 2026

Appearances and goals by club, season and competition
Club	Season	League			National cup (Note: Includes Danish Cup and FA Cup.)		League cup (Note: Includes EFL Cup)		Total	
Club	Season	Division	Apps	Goals	Apps	Goals	Apps	Goals	Apps	Goals
B.93	2020–21	2nd Division	5	0	3	1	—		8	1
B.93	2021–22	2nd Division	17	3	—		—		17	3
B.93	2022–23	2nd Division	25	7	1	0	—		26	7
B.93	2023–24	1st Division	14	3	1	0	—		15	3
B.93	Total		61	13	5	1	0	0	66	14
Randers	2023–24	Danish Superliga	8	0	–		—		8	0
Randers	2024–25	Danish Superliga	15	2	1	0	—		16	2
Randers	Total		23	2	1	0	0	0	24	2
West Bromwich Albion	2024–25	Championship	4	0	—		—		4	0
West Bromwich Albion	2025–26	Championship	4	0	0	0	0	0	4	0
West Bromwich Albion	2026–27	Championship	2	0	0	0	1	0	3	0
West Bromwich Albion	Total		10	0	0	0	1	0	11	0
Career total			94	15	7	1	1	0	101	16

=== International ===
As of match played 27 September 2026

Appearances and goals by national team and year
National team	Year	Apps	Goals
Jordan	2025	1	0
Jordan	2026	2	0
Total		3	0
