= 2025–26 West Bromwich Albion F.C. season =

English football club season

West Bromwich Albion
2025–26 season
- Owner: Bilkul Football WBA
- Chairman: Shilen Patel
- Head Coach: Ryan Mason (until 6 January); James Morrison (interim from 6 January until 11 January); Eric Ramsay (from 11 January until 24 February); James Morrison (interim from 4 March); James Morrison (from 30 April)
- Stadium: The Hawthorns
- Championship: 21st
- FA Cup: Fourth Round
- EFL Cup: First Round
- Top goalscorer: League: Aune Heggebø (9); Isaac Price (9); All: Aune Heggebø (10)
- Highest home attendance: 25,596 v Derby County (13 September 2025, EFL Championship)
- Lowest home attendance: 8,548 v Derby County (12 August 2025, EFL Cup)
- Average home league attendance: 23,605
- Biggest win: 3–0 v Hull City (Home, 14 March 2026, EFL Championship); 3–0 v Watford (Home, 21 April 2026, EFL Championship)
- Biggest defeat: 0–5 v Norwich City (Home, 20 January 2026, EFL Championship)
Home colours	Away colours	Third colours

The 2025–26 season is the 148th season in the history of West Bromwich Albion Football Club and their fifth consecutive season in the Championship. In addition to the domestic league, the club would also participate in the FA Cup, and the EFL Cup.

On 24 April 2026, West Bromwich Albion were deducted two points for breaking the EFL Profit and Sustainability Rules.

== Managerial changes ==
Before the season started, Ryan Mason was appointed head coach signing a three-year contract. However, on 6 January he was relieved of his duties after twenty-seven games in charge and 33.33% win ratio. Five days later, the club appointed Eric Ramsay from Minnesota United as the new head coach on a two-and-a-half-year contract. After nine games in charge and no wins, Ramsay was sacked as head coach. James Morrison once again took over on an interim basis, and on 4 March it was announced that he would remain in charge for the rest of the season. On 30 April, after securing survival, he was appointed as permanent manager on a two-year contract.

== Squad ==
As of 1 February 2026

No.	Name	Position	Nationality	Place of birth	Date of birth (age)	Signed from	Date signed	Fee	Contract end
Goalkeepers
1	Max O'Leary	GK	(Republic of Ireland)	(England) Bath	10 October 1996 (age 30)	Bristol City	22 January 2026	Free Transfer	30 June 2026
20	Josh Griffiths	GK	(England)	Hereford	5 September 2001 (age 25)	Academy	1 July 2020	—N/a	30 June 2027
Defenders
2	Chris Mepham	CB	(Wales)	(England) Harrow	5 November 1997 (age 29)	Bournemouth	28 July 2025	Undisclosed	30 June 2028
3	Nat Phillips	CB	(England)	Bolton	23 March 1997 (age 29)	Liverpool	23 June 2025	Undisclosed	30 June 2028
4	Callum Styles	LB	(Hungary)	(England) Bury	27 March 2000 (age 26)	Barnsley	24 August 2024	Undisclosed	30 June 2028
5	Krystian Bielik	CB	(Poland)	Konin	4 January 1998 (age 28)	Birmingham City	14 August 2025	£1,000,000	30 June 2028
6	George Campbell	CB	(United States)	Chester	22 June 2001 (age 25)	(Canada) CF Montréal	18 July 2025	Undisclosed	30 June 2029
14	Alfie Gilchrist	RB	(England)	Kingston-upon-Thames	28 November 2003 (age 22)	Chelsea	29 August 2025	Undisclosed	30 June 2029
29	Charlie Taylor	LB	(England)	York	18 September 1993 (age 33)	Southampton	1 September 2025	Loan	30 June 2026
41	Alex Williams	RB	(Wales)	Wales	2 January 2005 (age 21)	Academy	13 January 2023	—N/a	30 June 2026
30	Danny Imray	RB	(England)	Harold Wood	27 July 2003 (age 23)	Crystal Palace	30 January 2026	Loan	30 June 2026
Midfielders
8	Jayson Molumby	CM	(Republic of Ireland)	Cappoquin	6 August 1999 (age 27)	Brighton & Hove Albion	1 July 2022	£1,000,000	30 June 2028
17	Ousmane Diakité	CM	(Mali)	Mali	25 July 2000 (age 26)	(Austria) TSV Hartberg	27 June 2024	Free Transfer	30 June 2027
21	Isaac Price	AM	(Northern Ireland)	(England) Pontefract	26 September 2003 (age 23)	(Belgium) Standard Liege	22 January 2025	Undisclosed	30 June 2029
27	Alex Mowatt	CM	(England)	Doncaster	13 February 1995 (age 31)	Barnsley	2 July 2021	Free Transfer	30 June 2027
37	Ollie Bostock	CM	(Wales)	(England) Kingston-upon-Thames	20 February 2007 (age 19)	Academy	19 March 2024	—N/a	30 June 2027
25	Hindolo Mustapha	AM	(Sierra Leone)	England	26 July 2006 (age 20)	Crystal Palace	2 February 2026	Loan	30 June 2026
Forwards
7	Jed Wallace	RW	(England)	Reading	26 March 1994 (age 32)	Millwall	1 July 2022	Free Transfer	30 June 2026
9	Josh Maja	ST	(Nigeria)	(England) Lewisham	27 December 1998 (age 27)	(France) Bordeaux	1 August 2023	Free Transfer	30 June 2026
10	Karlan Grant	CF	(England)	Thamesmead	18 September 1997 (age 29)	Huddersfield Town	15 October 2020	£16,500,000	30 June 2026
11	Mikey Johnston	LW	(Republic of Ireland)	(Scotland) Glasgow	19 April 1999 (age 27)	(Scotland) Celtic	30 August 2024	£3,000,000	30 June 2028
12	Daryl Dike	ST	(United States)	Edmond	3 June 2000 (age 26)	(United States) Orlando City	1 January 2022	£8,630,000	30 June 2026
19	Aune Heggebø	ST	(Norway)	Bergen	29 July 2001 (age 25)	(Norway) Brann	7 July 2025	£4,750,000	30 June 2030
26	Tammer Bany	CF	(Jordan)	(Denmark) Copenhagen	19 October 2003 (age 23)	(Denmark) Randers	3 February 2025	Undisclosed	30 June 2028
18	Jamaldeen Jimoh-Aloba	LW	(England)	Birmingham	2 October 2006 (age 20)	Aston Villa	2 February 2026	Loan	30 June 2026
Out on Loan
23	Joe Wildsmith	GK	(England)	Sheffield	28 December 1995 (age 30)	Derby County	10 July 2024	Free Transfer	30 June 2026

== Statistics ==
=== Appearances and goals ===
As of 2 May 2026

Players with no appearances are not included on the list; italics indicate a loaned in player

No.	Pos	Nat	Player	Total		Championship		FA Cup		EFL Cup	
No.	Pos	Nat	Player	Apps	Goals	Apps	Goals	Apps	Goals	Apps	Goals
1	GK	(Republic of Ireland) IRL	Max O'Leary	17	0	16+0	0	0+1	0	0+0	0
2	DF	(Wales) WAL	Chris Mepham	26	1	21+4	1	1+0	0	0+0	0
3	DF	(England) ENG	Nat Phillips	41	3	40+0	3	0+1	0	0+0	0
4	MF	(Hungary) HUN	Callum Styles	47	0	41+4	0	1+0	0	1+0	0
5	DF	(Poland) POL	Krystian Bielik	19	0	11+6	0	2+0	0	0+0	0
6	DF	(United States) USA	George Campbell	41	4	33+6	4	0+1	0	1+0	0
7	FW	(England) ENG	Jed Wallace	25	3	11+12	2	0+1	1	0+1	0
8	MF	(Republic of Ireland) IRL	Jayson Molumby	39	2	30+7	2	0+1	0	0+1	0
9	FW	(Nigeria) NGR	Josh Maja	43	6	15+25	4	2+0	2	0+1	0
10	FW	(England) ENG	Karlan Grant	29	4	17+10	4	0+1	0	0+1	0
11	FW	(Republic of Ireland) IRL	Mikey Johnston	37	2	26+8	2	2+0	0	1+0	0
12	FW	(United States) USA	Daryl Dike	24	2	6+18	2	0+0	0	0+0	0
14	DF	(England) ENG	Alfie Gilchrist	15	0	8+5	0	2+0	0	0+0	0
17	MF	(Mali) MLI	Ousmane Diakité	39	1	26+10	1	2+0	0	1+0	0
18	MF	(England) ENG	Jamaldeen Jimoh-Aloba	11	0	4+6	0	0+1	0	0+0	0
19	FW	(Norway) NOR	Aune Heggebø	48	10	37+9	9	0+1	0	1+0	1
20	GK	(England) ENG	Josh Griffiths	26	0	23+1	0	2+0	0	0+0	0
21	MF	(Northern Ireland) NIR	Isaac Price	49	9	43+3	9	1+1	0	1+0	0
25	MF	(Sierra Leone) SLE	Hindolo Mustapha	2	0	0+1	0	1+0	0	0+0	0
26	FW	(Jordan) JOR	Tammer Bany	4	0	0+4	0	0+0	0	0+0	0
27	MF	(England) ENG	Alex Mowatt	41	1	32+7	1	0+1	0	1+0	0
29	DF	(England) ENG	Charlie Taylor	28	0	18+8	0	2+0	0	0+0	0
30	DF	(England) ENG	Danny Imray	16	1	12+3	1	1+0	0	0+0	0
34	MF	(England) ENG	Harry Whitwell	4	0	0+2	0	1+1	0	0+0	0
37	MF	(Wales) WAL	Ollie Bostock	9	1	2+5	1	1+1	0	0+0	0
39	FW	(Austria) AUT	Souleyman Mandey	1	0	0+1	0	0+0	0	0+0	0
41	DF	(Wales) WAL	Alex Williams	2	0	0+1	0	0+0	0	1+0	0
Players who featured but departed the club during the season:
2	DF	(England) ENG	Darnell Furlong	3	0	3+0	0	0+0	0	0+0	0
13	MF	(England) ENG	Toby Collyer	12	0	3+9	0	0+0	0	0+0	0
14	DF	(Norway) NOR	Torbjørn Heggem	1	0	1+0	0	0+0	0	0+0	0
15	DF	(England) ENG	Caleb Taylor	1	0	0+0	0	0+0	0	1+0	0
22	FW	(England) ENG	Samuel Iling-Junior	23	1	13+10	1	0+0	0	0+0	0
31	FW	(England) ENG	Tom Fellows	4	0	3+0	0	0+0	0	1+0	0
Players out on loan:
23	GK	(England) ENG	Joe Wildsmith	8	0	7+0	0	0+0	0	1+0	0

=== Disciplinary record ===
As of 2 May 2026

Rank	Number	Position	Nationality	Player	Championship			FA Cup			EFL Cup			Total		
Rank	Number	Position	Nationality	Player	Yellow card	(yellow card) (yellow-red card)	Red card	Yellow card	(yellow card) (yellow-red card)	Red card	Yellow card	(yellow card) (yellow-red card)	Red card	Yellow card	(yellow card) (yellow-red card)	Red card
1	4	DF	(Hungary)	Callum Styles	12	0	0	0	0	0	0	0	0	12	0	0
2	6	DF	(United States)	George Campbell	7	0	0	0	0	0	1	0	0	8	0	0
2	27	MF	(England)	Alex Mowatt	7	0	0	1	0	0	0	0	0	8	0	0
2	17	MF	(Mali)	Ousmane Diakité	7	0	0	1	0	0	0	0	0	8	0	0
5	2	DF	(Wales)	Chris Mepham	5	0	0	1	0	0	0	0	0	6	0	0
5	3	DF	(England)	Nat Phillips	6	0	0	0	0	0	0	0	0	6	0	0
5	8	MF	(Republic of Ireland)	Jayson Molumby	4	1	0	0	0	0	0	0	0	4	1	0
8	11	FW	(Republic of Ireland)	Mikey Johnston	3	0	0	1	0	0	0	0	0	4	0	0
8	21	MF	(Northern Ireland)	Isaac Price	4	0	0	0	0	0	0	0	0	4	0	0
8	29	DF	(England)	Charlie Taylor	3	0	0	1	0	0	0	0	0	4	0	0
11	5	DF	(Poland)	Krystian Bielik	2	0	0	1	0	0	0	0	0	3	0	0
11	10	FW	(England)	Karlan Grant	3	0	0	0	0	0	0	0	0	3	0	0
11	14	DF	(England)	Alfie Gilchrist	0	0	1	0	0	0	0	0	0	0	0	1
11	30	DF	(England)	Danny Imray	3	0	0	0	0	0	0	0	0	3	0	0
15	2	DF	(England)	Darnell Furlong	0	1	0	0	0	0	0	0	0	0	1	0
15	5	DF	(England)	Jed Wallace	2	0	0	1	0	0	0	0	0	2	0	0
15	19	FW	(Norway)	Aune Heggebø	2	0	0	0	0	0	0	0	0	2	0	0
18	9	FW	(Nigeria)	Josh Maja	1	0	0	0	0	0	0	0	0	1	0	0
18	12	FW	(United States)	Daryl Dike	1	0	0	0	0	0	0	0	0	1	0	0
18	22	DF	(England)	Samuel Iling-Junior	1	0	0	0	0	0	0	0	0	1	0	0
18	26	FW	(Jordan)	Tammer Bany	1	0	0	0	0	0	0	0	0	1	0	0
Total					49	2	1	6	0	0	1	0	0	56	2	1

== Transfers and contracts ==
=== In ===
Date	Pos.	Player	From	Fee	Ref.
23 June 2025	CB	(England) Nat Phillips	(England) Liverpool	£3,000,000	
2 July 2025	CF	(England) Jack Bray	(England) Harrogate Town	Undisclosed	
3 July 2025	LW	(England) Torin Ntege	(England) Peterborough United	Compensation	
7 July 2025	CF	(Norway) Aune Heggebø	(Norway) Brann	£4,750,000	
18 July 2025	CB	(United States) George Campbell	(Canada) Montréal	£1,000,000	
14 August 2025	CB	(Poland) Krystian Bielik	(England) Birmingham City	£1,000,000	
26 August 2025	CB	(Wales) Chris Mepham	(England) Bournemouth	Undisclosed	
29 August 2025	RB	(England) Alfie Gilchrist	(England) Chelsea	Undisclosed	
17 September 2025	GK	(England) Brian Okonkwo	(England) Arsenal	Free	
22 January 2026	GK	(Republic of Ireland) Max O'Leary	(England) Bristol City	Undisclosed	

Expenditure: ▼£9,750,000 (not inc. undisclosed transfers)

=== Out ===
Date	Pos.	Player	To	Fee	Ref.
30 June 2025	CF	(England) Reyes Cleary	(England) Barnsley	Undisclosed	
15 August 2025	CB	(Norway) Torbjørn Heggem	(Italy) Bologna	£10,000,000	
28 August 2025	RB	(England) Darnell Furlong	(England) Ipswich Town	Undisclosed	
29 August 2025	RW	(England) Tom Fellows	(England) Southampton	£10,000,000	
29 August 2025	CB	(England) Caleb Taylor	(England) Millwall	Undisclosed	
2 February 2026	CB	(England) Michael Parker	(Sweden) Örgryte	Undisclosed	

=== Loaned in ===
Date	Pos.	Player	From	Date until	Ref.
15 August 2025	CDM	(England) Toby Collyer	(England) Manchester United	1 January 2026 (Note: On 1 January, Collyer was recalled to his parent club Manchester United)	
1 September 2025	LW	(England) Samuel Iling-Junior	(England) Aston Villa	2 February 2026 (Note: On 2 February, Iling-Junior was recalled to Aston Villa from his initial season-long loan)	
1 September 2025	LB	(England) Charlie Taylor	(England) Southampton	31 May 2026	
30 January 2026	RB	(England) Danny Imray	(England) Crystal Palace	31 May 2026	
2 February 2026	CAM	(England) Jamaldeen Jimoh-Aloba	(England) Aston Villa	31 May 2026	
2 February 2026	CAM	(Sierra Leone) Hindolo Mustapha	(England) Crystal Palace	31 May 2026	

=== Loaned out ===
Date	Pos.	Player	To	Date until	Ref.
7 July 2025	CF	(Scotland) Eseosa Sule	(Scotland) Motherwell	1 January 2026 (Note: On 1 January, Sule was recalled from his loan at Motherwell)	
7 August 2025	GK	(England) Ben Cisse	(England) Rushall Olympic	4 September 2025	
15 August 2025	CM	(England) Harry Whitwell	(England) Forest Green Rovers	7 January 2026 (Note: On 7 January, Whitwell was recalled from his season-long loan at Forest Green)	
30 August 2025	CB	(England) Michael Parker	(England) Hereford	27 September 2025	
1 September 2025	RW	(England) Akeel Higgins	(England) Exeter City	31 May 2026	
18 October 2025	CB	(England) Michael Parker	(England) Hereford	21 November 2025	
19 November 2025	CM	(England) Cole Deeming	(England) Truro City	3 January 2026 (Note: On 18 December, Deeming's loan at Truro was extended until early January)	
21 January 2026	CM	(England) Cole Deeming	(England) Cheltenham Town	31 May 2026	
21 January 2026	LB	(England) Evan Humphries	(England) Oxford City	31 May 2026 (Note: On 19 February, Humphries' loan at Oxford City was extended until the end of the season)	
24 January 2026	CB	(England) Jamal Mohammed	(England) Gloucester City	31 May 2026 (Note: On 18 February, Mohammed's loan at Gloucester City was extended until the end of the season)	
2 February 2026	GK	(England) Joe Wildsmith	(England) Middlesbrough	31 May 2026	
13 February 2026	CF	(England) Dan Chimeziri	(England) Rushall Olympic	31 May 2026 (Note: On 18 March, Chimeziri's loan at Rushall Olympic was extended until the end of the season)	

=== Released/Out of contract ===
Date	Pos.	Player	Subsequent club	Join date	Ref.
30 June 2025	CB	(Nigeria) Semi Ajayi	(England) Hull City	1 July 2025	
30 June 2025	GK	(England) Ted Cann	(England) Rotherham United	1 July 2025	
30 June 2025	RW	(England) Archie Kirton	(England) Stourbridge	1 July 2025	
30 June 2025	AM	(England) Fran Cherchi	(England) Banbury United	12 July 2025	
30 June 2025	CM	(England) John Swift	(England) Portsmouth	15 July 2025	
30 June 2025	DM	(England) Matt Richards	(England) Hereford	6 August 2025	
30 June 2025	AM	(England) Fenton Heard	(England) Rushall Olympic	8 August 2025	
30 June 2025	GK	(Wales) Ronnie Hollingshead	(England) Aston Villa	14 August 2025	
30 June 2025	RW	(Democratic Republic of the Congo) Grady Diangana	(Spain) Elche	30 August 2025	
30 June 2025	LB	(England) Josh Shaw	(England) Hyde United	31 August 2025	
30 June 2025	LB	(England) Sam Beedie	(England) Wingate & Finchley		
30 June 2025	RB	(England) Reece Hall	(England) Kidderminister Harriers		
30 June 2025	CB	(Wales) Rhys Morrish	(England) Coventry City		
30 June 2025	LB	(England) Corey Sears			
8 August 2025	LB	(Italy) Gianluca Frabotta	(Italy) Cesena	12 August 2025	
8 August 2025	CB	(England) Kyle Bartley	Retired		
1 September 2025	CF	(Jamaica) Devante Cole	(England) Port Vale	1 September 2025	

=== New contract ===
Date	Pos.	Player	Contract expiry	Ref.
16 June 2025	RB	(England) Alfie Maughan	30 June 2027 (Note: First professional contract)	
1 July 2025	GK	(England) Louis Brady	30 June 2026 (Note: Club option of a further year)	
1 July 2025	CF	(England) Dan Chimeziri	30 June 2026	
3 July 2025	RW	(England) Akeel Higgins	30 June 2026	
3 July 2025	CF	(England) Layton Love	31 December 2025	
3 July 2025	CDM	(Austria) Souleyman Mandey	30 June 2027	
3 July 2025	CB	(England) Michael Parker	30 June 2027	
3 July 2025	CF	(Scotland) Eseosa Sule	30 June 2027	
3 July 2025	RB	(Wales) Alex Williams	30 June 2026	
8 August 2025	CM	(England) Harry Whitwell	30 June 2027	
12 August 2025	CM	(England) Cole Deeming	30 June 2027	
20 August 2025	CM	(England) Alex Mowatt	30 June 2027	
10 September 2025	CAM	(Wales) Ollie Bostock	30 June 2027	
3 October 2025	RB	(Wales) Alex Williams	30 June 2028	
18 March 2026	CDM	(Mali) Ousmane Diakité	30 June 2027	
16 April 2026	CB	(England) Abdul Abudu	30 June 2028	
16 April 2026	CDM	(England) Charlie Blackshields	30 June 2028	
16 April 2026	CM	(England) Ryan Colesby	30 June 2028	
16 April 2026	LB	(Algeria) Adam Letlat	30 June 2028	
28 April 2026	CAM	(England) Harry French	30 June 2028	
28 April 2026	GK	(England) Maxwell Moses	30 June 2028	
28 April 2026	CB	(Cyprus) Antonio Perkins	30 June 2028	
28 April 2026	CB	(England) George Shaw	30 June 2028	

== Pre-season and friendlies ==
On 5 June, West Bromwich Albion announced their first two pre-season friendlies, against Blackpool and Lincoln City. Two weeks later, a home friendly against Rayo Vallecano was confirmed. A week-long training camp in Austria had also been announced with a behind-closed-doors friendly against Dynamo Kyiv arranged.

Win Draw Loss Fixtures

4 July 2025 Unofficial Friendly	West Bromwich Albion	2–0	Port Vale	Walsall
14:00 BST	Bany; Bostock	Report		Stadium: West Bromwich Albion Training Ground; Attendance: 0 (behind-closed-doors)

11 July 2025 Friendly	Dynamo Kyiv	1–1	West Bromwich Albion	Bad Tatzmannsdorf, Austria
12:00 CEST	Yatsyk (yellow card) 55'; Vanat 76'	Report	Price (yellow card) 29'; Diakité (yellow card) 48'; Phillips 56' (yellow card) 60'	Stadium: Bad Tatzmannsdorf Fussballarena; Attendance: 0 (behind-closed-doors)

19 July 2025 Friendly	Blackpool	2–1	West Bromwich Albion	Blackpool
15:00 BST	Ennis 14'; Brown 23'	Report	Diakité 26'	Stadium: Bloomfield Road; Attendance: 5,109 (1,873 away)

22 July 2025 Unofficial Friendly	Fulham	1–0	West Bromwich Albion	New Malden
13:00 BST	Smith Rowe	Report		Stadium: Motspur Park Training Ground; Attendance: 0 (behind closed doors)

26 July 2025 Friendly	Lincoln City	4–2	West Bromwich Albion	Lincoln
15:00 BST	Makama 2', 3'; Towler 52'; Moylan 83'	Report	Grant 64'; Cole 90+2'	Stadium: Sincil Bank; Attendance: 3,810 (1,083 away)

2 August 2025 Friendly	West Bromwich Albion	3–2	Rayo Vallecano	West Bromwich
13:00 BST	Molumby 74', (yellow card) 80'; Grant 77'; Price 79'	Report	de Frutos 70'; Gumbau (yellow card) 78', (goal) 84'	Stadium: Hawthorns; Attendance: 8,197 (210 away)

== Competitions ==
=== Summary ===
==== August ====
Newly appointed manager Ryan Mason began his Albion tenure with an opening day clash at home to Blackburn. The hosts started brightly, grabbing the lead fifteen minutes in through Isaac Price. Albion held on in the second half, despite Darnell Furlong's red card, to win 1–0. The Baggies were in action just three days later in the EFL Cup, and were knocked out on penalties at the Hawthorns by Derby County. Aune Heggebø scored his first goal for the club in the second half, but Joe Ward equalised right at the death and the Rams won the subsequent shoot-out 3–2 to knock Albion out in the first round for the third year in a row. The first away day of the season was a trip to newly promoted Wrexham, with owners Ryan Reynolds and Rob McElhenney watching on. Isaac Price scored again to give Albion the lead, but the hosts hit back through Lewis O'Brien just before half-time. Substitutes Mikey Johnston and Jed Wallace combined to give the Baggies the lead in the second half, before Price grabbed his second to make 1–3. Sam Smith pulled one back for Wrexham late on, but it wasn't enough to stop Albion making it back-to-back victories to start the league campaign. Next up for the Baggies was Portsmouth at the Hawthorns, and it ended in a controversial 1–1 draw. Mikey Johnston gave the hosts a first half lead, but Colby Bishop equalised for Portsmouth just after the interval. Albion were denied a penalty for what seemed to be a clear foul on Aune Heggebø, and then saw a stonewall red card not be given moments later, with Ryan Mason sent off for his protests. Mason then had to watch from the stands as they won 0–1 away at Stoke, with Nat Phillips heading Albion into 2nd place going into the first international break.

==== September ====
West Bromwich Albion celebrated 125 years at the Hawthorns on the 13 September at home to Derby County, but the visitors spoiled the party with a late Andi Weimann strike. A long trip up to Teesside awaited the Baggies on the following Friday, against a Middlesbrough side top of the Championship table. Boro took lead through defender David Strelec, before Kaly Sène doubled the lead on the hour mark. Aune Heggebø pulled one back late on, but it wasn't enough as Middlesbrough took all three points. Next up for Albion was Leicester City under the Friday night lights at the Hawthorns. Samuel Iling-Junior made his full debut, and ten minutes in scored a wonderful solo goal. Albion had multiple chances to kill the game off, but didn't take them and were made to pay when Nat Phillips put the ball in his own net in stoppage time.

==== October ====
Norwich City in midweek were next up, having lost all of their home games so far. Josh Maja's first goal of the season was enough to earn all three points on the road, as Norwich's poor run at Carrow Road continued. Albion were then well beaten at the Den, with Millwall running out 3–0 winners. Jake Cooper gave the hosts a first half lead, before Femi Azeez and Zak Sturge extended their advantage in the second half. The Baggies returned home from the international break with a promising 2–1 victory over Preston. Mikey Johnston and Isaac Price put Albion 2–0 up, and held on despite a late Michael Smith consolation. They were unable to build on the victory however, falling to a 2–1 defeat at Vicarage Road the following Wednesday. Price scored again to give the Baggies the lead, but Watford turned it round through Imran Louza and Rocco Vata. Albion then lost on the road again, with Jack Clarke pouncing on a late mistake to win the game for Ipswich Town.

==== November ====
The poor run of form continued with a goalless draw at home to Sheffield Wednesday, who had recently entered administration and had been deducted 12 points. Albion performed better against Charlton, and Josh Griffiths saved a first half penalty, but they conceded a last minute Sonny Carey winner to ramp up the pressure on Ryan Mason. The Baggies did manage to end the poor run with 2–1 comeback win over Oxford United. Will Lankshear put the visitors in front, but Greg Leigh put the ball in his own net 2 minutes later to equalise. Aune Heggebø then came off the bench to score the winner twenty minutes from time. Following the final international break of the year, Albion fell to a 3–2 defeat against league leaders Coventry City. Aune Heggebø scored twice to put the Baggies 0–2 up, but the Sky Blues pulled a goal back through Josh Eccles before half-time. Following the interval, Jayson Molumby received his second yellow card, and Coventry took advantage, Ellis Simms and Victor Torp scoring to turn the game around. Back at the Hawthorns, Albion played out an entertaining 1–1 draw with local rivals Birmingham City. Alex Mowatt grabbed the opener, before Marvin Ducksch equalised late into the second half. The Baggies were back at home just three days later, up against Swansea City. The Swans made the perfect start, with Zan Vipotnik scoring after just 12 seconds before Ethan Galbraith made it two ten minutes later. However, Albion came out rejuvenated after the break, and Aune Heggebø squared the game with two quickfire goals before Jayson Molumby completed the comeback in the 85th minute.

==== December ====
Albion then lost on the road again the following weekend, falling to a 3–1 defeat at Queens Park Rangers. Aune Heggebø's sixth goal in seven games was not enough, as the host scored via a Jonathan Varane header and a brace from Rumarn Burrell. Down at St. Mary's in midweek, the Baggies lost their seventh consecutive away game. Adam Armstrong scored twice after an early Léo Scienza strike to put Southampton three goals up at half-time, and despite second-half goals from Karlan Grant and Nat Phillips, the hosts secured all three points as it finished 3–2. Mason's men picked up a much needed win under the Sky cameras on the Friday night, beating in form an inform Sheffield United side 2–0. Aune Heggebø put the Baggies in front just after half-time, before Karlan Grant doubled the lead ten minutes later to secure the three points. Once again, on the road Albion were defeated, as Hull City ran out 1–0 winners at the MKM Stadium just before Christmas, thanks to an Oli McBurnie penalty. On Boxing Day, Albion lost at home for the first time since September, losing 1–2 to Bristol City. Anis Mehmeti and Ross McCrorie gave the Robins a first-half lead, and Ousmane Diakité's late consolation was not enough to avoid defeat. The Baggies did bounce back to winning ways three days later, headers from George Campbell and Nat Phillips cancelling out a Diakité own goal, as they ended the year with a 2–1 victory over Queens Park Rangers.

==== January ====
On New Year's Day, Albion lost their ninth straight away game, losing 1–0 at Swansea City. Jay Fulton's 74th-minute strike was enough to give the hosts all three points. The Baggies were next in action against Leicester at the King Power on Monday Night Football. Jordan Ayew gave the foxes the lead, before Karlan Grant levelled up before the break. Albion created chances in the second-half, but once again were undone late on, Abdul Fatawu scoring a stoppage time winner to consign the visitors to a tenth consecutive defeat on their travels. The following day, Ryan Mason was sacked with the club sat 18th in the Championship. James Morrison took over the reins for the FA Cup clash at Swansea City, with the Baggies advancing on penalties. Following a goalless first half, Eom Ji-sung curled the Swans in front, before Josh Maja equalised five minutes later. Jed Wallace gave the visitors the lead in extra-time, but this time Swansea came up with a quick-fire response as Zeidane Inoussa found the back of the net, sending it to spot-kicks. Ollie Bostock scored the winning penalty, as Albion won 5–6 to put their name in the hat for the Fourth Round draw. Later that evening, Eric Ramsay was appointed new manager on and two-and-a-half-year deal. Ramsay's first match in charge was against Middlesbrough under the Friday night lights at the Hawthorns. A Charlie Taylor own goal and a superb strike from Sammy Silvera had the visitors 0–2 up, before Isaac Price and Jed Wallace brought the game back level. However, once again, Albion conceded late on, as Delano Burgzorg came off the bench to win the game for Boro. The bad news kept on coming for Eric Ramsay, as Albion were embarrassed at home, losing 0–5 to Norwich City. Oscar Schwartau, Ali Ahmed, Anis Ben Slimane, Ben Chrisene and Mathias Kvistgaarden all scored for the Canaries in a dominant win. The Baggies were in action again on a Friday night just three days later, making the trip to Pride Park to face Derby County. Patrick Agyemang gave the hosts the lead right before half-time, but Chris Mepham scrambled home an equaliser to end Albion's 10-match losing streak on the road. Albion slipped even closer to the bottom three with a 3–0 defeat away at Portsmouth. Conor Chaplin, Millenic Alli and Ebou Adams all scored for Pompey in a comfortable win at Fratton Park.

==== February ====
After briefly entering the relegation zone following Blackburn Rovers' win against Sheffield Wednesday, Albion climbed back out with a 0–0 draw with Stoke City. They followed this up in midweek with another goalless draw, this time in a resolute performance at local rivals Birmingham City. Up next was a trip to Carrow Road in the FA Cup, with Albion exiting in the fourth round. Josh Maja bagged for the visitors, but it was not enough as Paris Maghoma, Ben Chrisene and Mohamed Touré all scored for Norwich in a 3–1 triumph. Albion were defeated 0–2 by league leaders Coventry City the following weekend. First-half strikes from Ephron Mason-Clark and Jack Rudoni were enough the secure the three points for the visiting Sky Blues. With the pressure on Eric Ramsay rapidly increasing, the Baggies faced Charlton Athletic at the Hawthorns in a must-win encounter. George Campbell headed the hosts in front just before half-time, but Albion didn't take their chances and Lyndon Dykes grabbed an equaliser for Charlton in the last twenty minutes. Eric Ramsay was sacked soon after full-time, having been in charge for nine games and failing to win a single game. Interim James Morrison's first game in charge was huge clash with relegation rivals Oxford United, and the bad form continued as Albion were beaten 2–1. Stan Mills and Will Lankshear headed the hosts into a 2–0 lead, before Ollie Bostock pulled one back. However, it was not enough and the Baggies were beaten once again on their travels.

==== March ====
During the week, it was announced that Morrison would continue as interim for the rest of the season, and he followed that news up by gaining a point at Bramall Lane against Sheffield United. George Campbell scored at both ends in a 1–1 draw. Albion then produced a stellar performance in midweek at home to an in-form Southampton side, with Jayson Molumby grabbing the opening goal just before half-time. The Baggies pushed for a second after the interval, but as so often was the case during the season, they couldn't hold on and the Saints snatched a late equaliser through Cyle Larin. With the momentum shifting, Albion finally got their first win of 2026 with a 3–0 victory over play-off chasing Hull City at the Hawthorns. Josh Maja gave the hosts an early lead, before Charlie Hughes was sent off for the Tigers. Making the most of the man advantage, Aune Heggebø and Isaac Price bagged in the second half to secure a vital victory that moved Albion back out of the bottom three. The Baggies followed that win up with a crucial three points at Ashton Gate, George Campbell scoring the only goal of the game to secure their first away win since October.

==== April ====
Wrexham visited the Hawthorns on Good Friday following the March international break, and were involved in a pulsating 2–2 draw. A classic game of two-halves, Albion dominated the first and went 2–0 via a free-kick from Isaac Price own goal and a penalty from Josh Maja. Wrexham hit back after half-time, with Josh Windass and Dobson levelling the scoreline, but Albion held on to secure a vital point. The Baggies extended their unbeaten record to six games thanks to an Easter Monday point away at Blackburn Rovers. With over 7,000 away supporters in attendance, neither side could find a goal as it ended in a stalemate. Albion played out another goalless draw the following Friday, this time at home to promotion-chasing Millwall. A trip to Deepdale followed, and the Baggies returned with a vital victory. Josh Maja smashed the visitors in front, before Daryl Dike sealed the points in the 77th minute with his first goal of the season. Albion mathematically secured their survival with a 3–0 home win over Watford in midweek. Isaac Price, Daryl Dike and Danny Imray all scored as Albion went nine unbeaten and preserved their Championship status for another season. However just two days later, it was announced that the club would be deducted 2 points for breaching P&S rules, leaving them 6 points clear of the relegation zone with just two games to go. Albion faced Ipswich Town in their final home game of the season, and secured the point that once again ensured their survival. The Baggies outplayed their rivals who were on the hunt for automatic promotion, but ultimately settled for a point in an entertaining 0–0 draw. On 30 April, it was announced that James Morrison would become Albion's new permanent head coach, heading into their final league fixture and the upcoming Championship season.

==== May ====
The final day of the season saw the Baggies face bottom side Sheffield Wednesday, coming into the game ten games unbeaten, having kept clean sheets in all of their previous five. Backed by over 33,000 returning fans after news of a takeover, Wednesday picked up their first home win of the season, finishing the season on 0 points, after their 18-point deduction. Nathaniel Chalobah and Liam Palmer scored for the hosts, and despite Karlan Grant's late goal, Albion finished their season with a 2–1 defeat, finishing 21st in the table.

=== Overall record ===
Competition	First match	Last match	Starting round	Final position	Record							
Competition	First match	Last match	Starting round	Final position	Pld	W	D	L	GF	GA	GD	Win %
Championship	9 August 2025	2 May 2026	Matchday 1	21st	46	13	14	19	48	58	−10	28.26
FA Cup	11 January 2026	14 February 2026	Third Round	Fourth Round	2	0	1	1	3	5	−2	0.00
EFL Cup	12 August 2025	12 August 2025	First Round	First Round	1	0	1	0	1	1	+0	0.00
Total					49	13	16	20	52	64	−12	26.53

Last updated: 2 May 2026
Source: Soccerway

=== Championship ===
==== League table ====
Pos	Team	Pld	W	D	L	GF	GA	GD	Pts	Promotion, qualification or relegation
19	Charlton Athletic	46	13	14	19	44	58	−14	53	
20	Blackburn Rovers	46	13	13	20	42	56	−14	52	
21	West Bromwich Albion	46	13	14	19	48	58	−10	51 (Note: West Bromwich Albion were deducted two points on 24 April 2026 for breaching PSR rules.)	
22	Oxford United (R)	46	11	14	21	45	59	−14	47	Relegation to EFL League One
23	Leicester City (R)	46	12	16	18	58	68	−10	46 (Note: Leicester City were deducted six points on 5 February 2026 for breaching PSR rules.)	Relegation to EFL League One

Source: EFL Official Website
Rules for classification: 1) Points; 2) Goal difference; 3) Number of goals scored; 4) Head-to-head results; 5) Wins; 6) Away goals; 7) Penalty points (sec 9.5); 8) Number of 12-point sending off offences; 9) Play-off (only if needed to determine promotion/relegation)
(R) Relegated

==== Results summary ====
Overall								Home						Away					
Pld	W	D	L	GF	GA	GD	Pts	W	D	L	GF	GA	GD	W	D	L	GF	GA	GD
46	13	14	19	48	58	−10	51	8	10	5	28	25	+3	5	4	14	20	33	−13

Last updated: 2 May 2026.
Source: Soccerway

==== Results by round ====
Round	1	2	3	4	5	6	7	8	9	10	11	12	13	14	15	16	17	18	19	20	21	22	23	24	25	26	27	28	29	30	31	32	33	34	35	36	37	38	39	40	41	42	43	44	45	46
Ground	H	A	H	A	H	A	H	A	A	H	A	A	H	A	H	A	H	H	A	A	H	A	H	H	A	A	H	H	A	A	H	A	H	H	A	A	H	H	A	H	A	H	A	H	H	A
Result	W	W	D	W	L	L	D	W	L	W	L	L	D	L	W	L	D	W	L	L	W	L	L	W	L	L	L	L	D	L	D	D	L	D	L	D	D	W	W	D	D	D	W	W	D	L
Position	9	3	4	2	5	7	8	4	7	5	10	11	12	15	14	17	17	12	16	16	16	16	16	16	18	18	19	19	20	22	20	21	21	21	21	21	23	21	20	20	20	20	20	20^{*}	21	21
Points	3	6	7	10	10	10	11	14	14	17	17	17	18	18	21	21	22	25	25	25	28	28	28	31	31	31	31	31	32	32	33	34	34	35	35	36	37	40	43	44	45	46	49	50^{*}	51	51

Source: Soccerway
^{*} West Brom were originally 18th at the end of Matchday 44. On 24 April 2026, they were deducted 2 points, subsequently bringing them down to 20th.
A = Away; H = Home; W = Win; D = Draw; L = Loss

==== Matches ====
Win Draw Loss Fixtures

9 August 2025 1	West Bromwich Albion	1–0	Blackburn Rovers	West Bromwich
15:00 BST	Price 15'; Phillips (yellow card) 47'; Grant (yellow card) 49'; Furlong (yellow card) 79' (yellow-red card) 90+5'	Report		Stadium: Hawthorns; Attendance: 24,653 (2,215 away); Referee: David Webb

16 August 2025 2	Wrexham	2–3	West Bromwich Albion	Wrexham
12:30 BST	Brunt (yellow card) 27'; O'Brien 42'; Smith 90+5', (yellow card) 90+5'	Report	Price 20', 81'; Wallace 74'	Stadium: Racecourse Ground; Attendance: 10,656 (1,275 away); Referee: John Busby
Note: Live on Sky Sports

23 August 2025 3	West Bromwich Albion	1–1	Portsmouth	West Bromwich
15:00 BST	Campbell (yellow card) 7'; Johnston 26'; Mowatt (yellow card) 70'	Report	Swift (yellow card) 43'; Bishop 56' (yellow card) 66'; Poole (yellow card) 63'; Le Roux (yellow card) 78'; Waddingham (yellow card) 80'	Stadium: Hawthorns; Attendance: 24,818 (2,473 away); Referee: Elliot Bell

30 August 2025 4	Stoke City	0–1	West Bromwich Albion	Stoke-on-Trent
12:30 BST	Tchamadeu (yellow card) 60'	Report	Phillips 14'; Price (yellow card) 60'; Campbell (yellow card) 70'	Stadium: bet365 Stadium; Attendance: 25,328 (3,394 away); Referee: Matt Donohue
Note: Live on Sky Sports+

13 September 2025 5	West Bromwich Albion	0–1	Derby County	West Bromwich
15:00 BST	Styles (yellow card) 62'	Report	Travis (yellow card) 59'; Weimann 84'; Sanderson (yellow card) 89'	Stadium: Hawthorns; Attendance: 25,596 (2,526 away); Referee: Reubyn Ricardo

19 September 2025 6	Middlesbrough	2–1	West Bromwich Albion	Middlesbrough
20:00 BST	Strelec 26'; Sène 61'	Report	Heggebø 90'	Stadium: Riverside Stadium; Attendance: 27,803 (1,061 away); Referee: Andrew Kitchen
Note: Live on Sky Sports

26 September 2025 7	West Bromwich Albion	1–1	Leicester City	West Bromwich
20:00 BST	Iling-Junior 10'; Phillips (yellow card) 47'; Molumby (yellow card) 70'	Report	Carranza (yellow card) 61'; Monga (yellow card) 88'; Vestergaard (yellow card) 90'; Choudhury (yellow card) 90+1'; Phillips 90+3' (o.g.); Fatawu (yellow card) 90+5'	Stadium: Hawthorns; Attendance: 24,235 (2,540 away); Referee: Stephen Martin
Note: Live on Sky Sports

1 October 2025 8	Norwich City	0–1	West Bromwich Albion	Norwich
19:45 BST	Crnac (yellow card) 79'	Report	Maja 20'; Campbell (yellow card) 28'; Mepham (yellow card) 66'; Price (yellow card) 70'; Mowatt (yellow card) 71'	Stadium: Carrow Road; Attendance: 24,640 (711 away); Referee: Sam Allison

4 October 2025 9	Millwall	3–0	West Bromwich Albion	Bermondsey
15:00 BST	Cooper 18' (yellow card) 45+2'; Azeez 56'; Sturge 72'	Report	Mepham (yellow card) 12'; Styles (yellow card) 30'	Stadium: The Den; Attendance: 17,865 (2,000 away); Referee: Tim Robinson

18 October 2025 10	West Bromwich Albion	2–1	Preston North End	West Bromwich
15:00 BST	Phillips (yellow card) 10'; Johnston 40'; Price 62'; Mepham (yellow card) 66'	Report	Storey (yellow card) 65'; Smith 78'	Stadium: Hawthorns; Attendance: 24,068 (1,998 away); Referee: Andrew Kitchen

22 October 2025 11	Watford	2–1	West Bromwich Albion	Watford
19:45 BST	Louza 38'; Vata 58'	Report	Price 34'; Styles (yellow card) 42'; Heggebø (yellow card) 46'	Stadium: Vicarage Road; Attendance: 17,308 (1,599 away); Referee: Leigh Doughty

25 October 2025 12	Ipswich Town	1–0	West Bromwich Albion	Ipswich
12:30 BST	Hirst (yellow card) 75'; Clarke 83'	Report	Mepham (yellow card) 78'	Stadium: Portman Road; Attendance: 28,447 (2,025 away); Referee: Josh Smith
Note: Live on Sky Sports

1 November 2025 13	West Bromwich Albion	0–0	Sheffield Wednesday	West Bromwich
12:30 GMT	Maja (yellow card) 85'	Report	Ugbo (yellow card) 70'	Stadium: Hawthorns; Attendance: 23,622 (2,515 away); Referee: Ben Toner
Note: Live on Sky Sports+

4 November 2025 14	Charlton Athletic	1–0	West Bromwich Albion	Charlton
19:45 BST	Docherty (penalty missed) 36'; Carey 90+5'	Report		Stadium: The Valley; Attendance: 17,147 (1,453 away); Referee: Lewis Smith

8 November 2025 15	West Bromwich Albion	2–1	Oxford United	West Bromwich
15:00 GMT	Leigh 56' (o.g.); Heggebø 70'	Report	Lankshear 54'	Stadium: Hawthorns; Attendance: 22,898 (1,630 away); Referee: Jacob Miles

22 November 2025 16	Coventry City	3–2	West Bromwich Albion	Coventry
12:30 BST	Torp (yellow card) 28', (goal) 61'; Mason-Clark (yellow card) 31'; Eccles 41'; Simms 56'	Report	Heggebø 9', 32'; Molumby (yellow card) 31' (yellow-red card) 49'; Phillips (yellow card) 69'	Stadium: Coventry Building Society Arena; Attendance: 29,216 (1,522 away); Referee: Andrew Kitchen
Note: Live on Sky Sports

26 November 2025 17	West Bromwich Albion	1–1	Birmingham City	West Bromwich
20:00 GMT	Mowatt 12'; Johnston (yellow card) 77'	Report	Klarer (yellow card) 28'; Iwata (yellow card) 33'; Ducksch 78'	Stadium: Hawthorns; Attendance: 24,282 (2,538 away); Referee: Thomas Kirk
Note: Live on Sky Sports

29 November 2025 18	West Bromwich Albion	3–2	Swansea City	West Bromwich
15:00 GMT	Phillips (yellow card) 32'; Heggebø 47', 52'; Molumby 85'	Report	Vipotnik 1'; Galbraith 12'; Key (yellow card) 65'; Cullen (yellow card) 84'	Stadium: Hawthorns; Attendance: 22,200 (1,032 away); Referee: Tom Nield

6 December 2025 19	Queens Park Rangers	3–1	West Bromwich Albion	Shepherd's Bush
15:00 BST	Varane 45+4'; Burrell 59', 87'; Norrington-Davies (yellow card) 90+4'	Report	Grant (yellow card) 39'; Heggebø 76'	Stadium: Loftus Road; Attendance: 16,745 (1,545 away); Referee: Gavin Ward

9 December 2025 20	Southampton	3–2	West Bromwich Albion	Southampton
19:45 GMT	Scienza 12'; Armstrong 17', 35', (yellow card) 49'; Romeu (yellow card) 89'	Report	Diakité (yellow card) 8'; Grant 62'; Price (yellow card) 78'; Phillips 86'	Stadium: St. Mary's Stadium; Attendance: 26,865 (1,048 away); Referee: Sam Allison

12 December 2025 21	West Bromwich Albion	2–0	Sheffield United	West Bromwich
20:00 GMT	Heggebø 50'; Grant 61'	Report	Tanganga (yellow card) 65'	Stadium: Hawthorns; Attendance: 22,217 (1,697 away); Referee: Matt Donohue
Note: Live on Sky Sports

20 December 2025 22	Hull City	1–0	West Bromwich Albion	Kingston upon Hull
15:00 BST	Belloumi (yellow card) 45+4'; McBurnie 45+7' (pen.); Crooks (yellow card) 55'; Giles (yellow card) 82'; Pandur (yellow card) 90+2'	Report	Taylor (yellow card) 28'; Mepham (yellow card) 45+10'; Campbell (yellow card) 50'; Gilchrist (yellow card) 75'; Styles (yellow card) 80'	Stadium: MKM Stadium; Attendance: Ruebyn Ricardo; Referee: 21,218 (1,783 away)

26 December 2025 23	West Bromwich Albion	1–2	Bristol City	West Bromwich
15:00 GMT	Diakité (yellow card) 58', (goal) 85'	Report	Mehmeti 4', (yellow card) 16'; McCrorie 22', (yellow card) 45+2'; Pring (yellow card) 62'	Stadium: Hawthorns; Attendance: 25,050 (1,892 away); Referee: Will Finnie

29 December 2025 24	West Bromwich Albion	2–1	Queens Park Rangers	West Bromwich
15:00 GMT	Campbell 24'; Phillips 55'	Report	Diakité 35' (o.g.); Dunne (yellow card) 37'; Morgan (yellow card) 42'	Stadium: Hawthorns; Attendance: 23,485 (1,500 away); Referee: Lewis Smith

1 January 2026 25	Swansea City	1–0	West Bromwich Albion	Landore
15:00 BST	Tymon (yellow card) 68'; Fulton 74', (yellow card) 90+4'	Report	Campbell (yellow card) 2'; Styles (yellow card) 26'; Mowatt (yellow card) 31'; Iling-Junior (yellow card) 45'; Diakité (yellow card) 53'	Stadium: Swansea.com Stadium; Attendance: 17,416 (1,196 away); Referee: James Linington

5 January 2026 26	Leicester City	2–1	West Bromwich Albion	Leicester
20:00 BST	Ayew 18'; Choudhury (yellow card) 77'; Fatawu 90+4'	Report	Grant 34'	Stadium: King Power Stadium; Attendance: 27,130 (1,208 away); Referee: Stephen Martin
Note: Live on Sky Sports

16 January 2026 27	West Bromwich Albion	2–3	Middlesbrough	West Bromwich
20:00 GMT	Mepham (yellow card) 69'; Price 75'; Wallace 80'; Styles (yellow card) 88'	Report	Taylor 43' (o.g.); Silvera 58'; Burgzorg 90'	Stadium: Hawthorns; Attendance: 23,568 (2,190 away); Referee: Joshua Smith
Note: Live on Sky Sports

20 January 2026 28	West Bromwich Albion	0–5	Norwich City	West Bromwich
19:45 GMT	Styles (yellow card) 14'; Bielik (yellow card) 23'; Johnston (yellow card) 72'	Report	Schwartau 16'; Ahmed 49'; Slimane 69'; Chrisene 73'; Kovačević (yellow card) 87'; Kvistgaarden 89'	Stadium: Hawthorns; Attendance: 21,031 (829 away); Referee: James Bell

23 January 2026 29	Derby County	1–1	West Bromwich Albion	Derby
20:00 BST	Agyemang 44'; Travis (yellow card) 59'; Elder (yellow card) 83'	Report	Grant (yellow card) 5'; Heggebø (yellow card) 40'; Molumby (yellow card) 53'; Mepham 90+5'	Stadium: Pride Park; Attendance: 28,099 (2,872 away); Referee: Anthony Backhouse
Note: Live on Sky Sports

31 January 2026 30	Portsmouth	3–0	West Bromwich Albion	Portsmouth
15:00 BST	Chaplin 20'; Alli 25'; Adams 49'	Report	Phillips (yellow card) 11'; Johnston (yellow card) 22'	Stadium: Fratton Park; Attendance: 20,413 (2,005 away); Referee: Matthew Donohue

7 February 2026 31	West Bromwich Albion	0–0	Stoke City	West Bromwich
15:01 GMT	Mowatt (yellow card) 22'	Report	Wilmot (yellow card) 24'	Stadium: Hawthorns; Attendance: 23,991 (2,542 away); Referee: David Webb

10 February 2026 32	Birmingham City	0–0	West Bromwich Albion	Bordesley
20:00 GMT	Vicente (yellow card) 90+6'	Report	Imray (yellow card) 16'; Styles (yellow card) 30'; Price (yellow card) 64'; Mowatt (yellow card) 90+4'; Taylor (yellow card) 90+7'	Stadium: St. Andrew's Stadium; Attendance: 27,307 (2,005 away); Referee: Adam Herczeg
Note: Fixture was initially scheduled for 14 February, but was rescheduled due to both teams in FA Cup involvements. Note: Live on Sky Sports

21 February 2026 33	West Bromwich Albion	0–2	Coventry City	West Bromwich
12:30 GMT		Report	Mason-Clark 5' van Ewijk (yellow card) 16'; Sakamoto (yellow card) 17'; Rudoni 32'; Thomas (yellow card) 38'	Stadium: Hawthorns; Attendance: 23,479 (2,542 away); Referee: James Linington
Note: Live on Sky Sports

24 February 2026 34	West Bromwich Albion	1–1	Charlton Athletic	West Bromwich
19:45 GMT	Styles (yellow card) 27'; Campbell 45+3'; Molumby (yellow card) 49'	Report	Jones (yellow card) 10'; Clarke (yellow card) 57'; Sichenje (yellow card) 66'; Dykes 70'	Stadium: The Hawthorns; Attendance: 20,847 (826 away); Referee: Sam Allison

28 February 2026 35	Oxford United	2–1	West Bromwich Albion	Oxford
15:00 GMT	Mills 14'; Lankshear 26'	Report	Bostock 33'; Wallace (yellow card) 36'; Bielik (yellow card) 90+6'	Stadium: Kassam Stadium; Attendance: 11,054 (1,493 away); Referee: Matthew Corlett

7 March 2026 36	Sheffield United	1–1	West Bromwich Albion	Sheffield
15:00 GMT	Riedewald (yellow card) 47'; Campbell 53' (o.g.); Hamer (yellow card) 90+5'	Report	Taylor (yellow card) 80'; Campbell 83'	Stadium: Bramall Lane; Attendance: 28,307 (2,124 away); Referee: Dean Whitestone

11 March 2026 37	West Bromwich Albion	1–1	Southampton	West Bromwich
19:45 GMT	Molumby 45'; Imray (yellow card) 75'; Diakité (yellow card) 86'	Report	Stephens (yellow card) 50'; Bragg (yellow card) 68'; Larin 90+1'	Stadium: Hawthorns; Attendance: 22,127 (1,890 away); Referee: Benjamin Speedie

14 March 2026 38	West Bromwich Albion	3–0	Hull City	West Bromwich
15:00 GMT	Maja 24'; Diakité (yellow card) 62'; Heggebø 67'; Price 90+4'	Report	Hughes (red card) 36'; Crooks (yellow card) 52'; McBurnie (yellow card) 62'; Gelhardt (yellow card) 71'; Lundstram (yellow card) 89'	Stadium: Hawthorns; Attendance: 23,245 (1,823 away); Referee: Josh Smith

21 March 2026 39	Bristol City	0–1	West Bromwich Albion	Bristol
15:00 GMT	Horvat (yellow card) 39'	Report	Campbell 26'; Styles (yellow card) 84'	Stadium: Ashton Gate; Attendance: 23,659 (3,053 away); Referee: Thomas Kirk

3 April 2026 40	West Bromwich Albion	2–2	Wrexham	West Bromwich
15:00 BST	Price 27'; Maja 39' (pen.); Styles (yellow card) 62'; Campbell (yellow card) 75'	Report	Kaboré (yellow card) 39'; Windass 48'; Dobson 63'	Stadium: Hawthorns; Attendance: 25,927 (2,522 away); Referee: Bobby Madley

6 April 2026 41	Blackburn Rovers	0–0	West Bromwich Albion	Blackburn
15:00 BST	McLoughlin (yellow card) 24'; Pickering (yellow card) 27'; Wharton (yellow card) 45'	Report	Diakité (yellow card) 48'; Dike (yellow card) 90+2'	Stadium: Ewood Park; Attendance: 21,581 (7,432 away); Referee: Rob Jones

10 April 2026 42	West Bromwich Albion	0–0	Millwall	West Bromwich
20:00 BST	Mowatt (yellow card) 57'; Ivanovic (yellow card) 90+5'	Report	Azeez (yellow card) 72'	Stadium: Hawthorns; Attendance: 23,447 (2,501 away); Referee: Lewis Smith
Note: Live on Sky Sports

18 April 2026 43	Preston North End	0–2	West Bromwich Albion	Preston
15:00 BST		Report	Maja 11'; Dike 77'	Stadium: Deepdale; Attendance: 17,996 (3,952 away); Referee: Josh Smith

21 April 2026 44	West Bromwich Albion	3–0	Watford	West Bromwich
19:45 BST	Styles (yellow card) 11'; Price 21'; Imray (yellow card) 28' (goal) 69'; Dike 41'; Molumby (yellow card) 51'; Mowatt (yellow card) 86'	Report	Pollock (yellow card) 31'; Irankunda (yellow card) 45+1'; Abankwah (yellow card) 49'	Stadium: Hawthorns; Attendance: 22,805 (1,236 away); Referee: Anthony Backhouse

25 April 2026 45	West Bromwich Albion	0–0	Ipswich Town	West Bromwich
12:30 BST	Dike (yellow card) 59'; Campbell (yellow card) 80'	Report	Kipré (yellow card) 28'; Matusiwa (yellow card) 58'; Greaves (yellow card) 90+4'	Stadium: Hawthorns; Attendance: 25,318 (2,531 away); Referee: Matt Donohue
Note: Live on Sky Sports

2 May 2026 46	Sheffield Wednesday	2–1	West Bromwich Albion	Owlerton
12:30 BST	Chalobah (yellow card) 32' (goal) 36'; Palmer 40'; Lowe (yellow card) 57'; Heskey (yellow card) 81'	Report	Diakité (yellow card) 12'; Grant 81'; Bany (yellow card) 90'	Stadium: Hillsborough Stadium; Attendance: 33,750 (2,460 away); Referee: Lewis Smith

=== FA Cup ===
West Brom entered the FA Cup at the third round stage, and were drawn away against Swansea City. Then away to Norwich City in the fourth round.

Win Draw Loss Fixtures

11 January 2026 Third Round	Swansea City	2–2 (a.e.t.) (5–6 p)	West Bromwich Albion	Landore
14:30 GMT	Eom Ji-sung 48'; Stamenić (yellow card) 72'; Inoussa 112'	Report	Maja 53'; Taylor (yellow card) 55'; Johnston (yellow card) 69'; Mepham (yellow card) 96'; Wallace 108'	Stadium: Swansea.com Stadium; Attendance: 9,881 (4,746 away); Referee: Elliot Bell
	Penalties
	Cabango (penalty scored); Fulton (penalty scored); Galbraith (penalty scored); Burgess (penalty scored); Inoussa (penalty scored); Wales (penalty missed); Yalcoué (penalty missed)		Heggebø (penalty scored); Price (penalty scored); Styles (penalty scored); Grant (penalty scored); Wallace (penalty scored); Mepham (penalty missed); Bostock (penalty scored)

14 February 2026 Fourth Round	Norwich City	3–1	West Bromwich Albion	Norwich
15:00 GMT	Maghoma 31'; Darling (yellow card) 48'; Field (yellow card) 58'; Fisher (yellow card) 70'; Chrisene 82'; Touré 90+3'	Report	Bielik (yellow card) 14'; Mowatt (yellow card) 53'; Maja 68'; Diakité (yellow card) 85'	Stadium: Carrow Road; Attendance: 25,538 (3,102 away); Referee: Tom Reeves

=== EFL Cup ===
West Brom were drawn at home to Derby County in the first round.

Win Draw Loss Fixtures

12 August 2025 First Round	West Bromwich Albion	1–1 (2–3 p)	Derby County	West Bromwich
19:45 BST	Campbell (yellow card) 48'; Heggbø 67'	Report	Elder (yellow card) 25'; Weimann (yellow card) 56'; Adams (yellow card) 83'; Ward 90+6'	Stadium: Hawthorns; Attendance: 8,548 (1,381 away); Referee: Thomas Kirk
	Penalties
	Wallace (penalty missed); Maja (penalty missed); Mowatt (penalty scored); Molumby (penalty scored); Grant (penalty missed)		Goudmijn (penalty scored); Osborn (penalty missed); Jackson (penalty scored); Ward (penalty missed); Adams (penalty scored)

== End of season awards ==
The winners of the 2024/25 end of season West Bromwich Albion awards were announced on 25 April 2025.

- Supporters' Player of the Season (Hungary) Callum Styles
- Players’ Player of the Season (Hungary) Callum Styles
- Top Goalscorer (Norway) Aune Heggebø 10 goals
- Goal of the Season (United States) George Campbell v Sheffield United (Away)
- Young Player of the Season (Wales) Ollie Bostock
