= Frederick Arnold =

Frederick Arnold may refer to:

- Frederick Arnold (rower) (1823–1898), English rower
- Lance-Bombardier Frederick Arnold (1890–1916), Canadian soldier
- Frederick Arnold (cricketer) (1899–1980), English cricketer and British Army officer
- Freddy Arnold, character in Streamline Express

== See also ==
- Frederick Arnold-Baker (1885–1963), British lawyer
