= Alex Williams =

Alex Williams may refer to:

- Alex Williams (actor), Australian actor
- Alex Williams (alpine skier) (born 1963), American alpine skier
- Alex Williams (footballer, born 1961), English goalkeeper
- Alex Williams (footballer, born 1983), Scottish striker
- Alex Williams (footballer, born 2005), Welsh football defender
- Alexander Williams (cartoonist) (born 1967), animator and cartoonist
- Alexander S. Williams (1839–1917), NYPD police inspector
- Alexander Williams, Jr. (born 1948), U.S. federal judge
- Alex Williams (Australian footballer) (born 1993), Australian rules football player for Fremantle in the AFLW
- Alex Williams, co-author of Inventing the Future: Postcapitalism and a World Without Work
- Alex Williams, Welsh child sex offender who supplied newsreader Huw Edwards with illegal images

== See also ==
- Alex (disambiguation)
- Williams (disambiguation)
- Alexander Williams (disambiguation)
- Alex Willian (born 1988) Brazilian soccer player
