= Ousmane Diakité =

Malian footballer

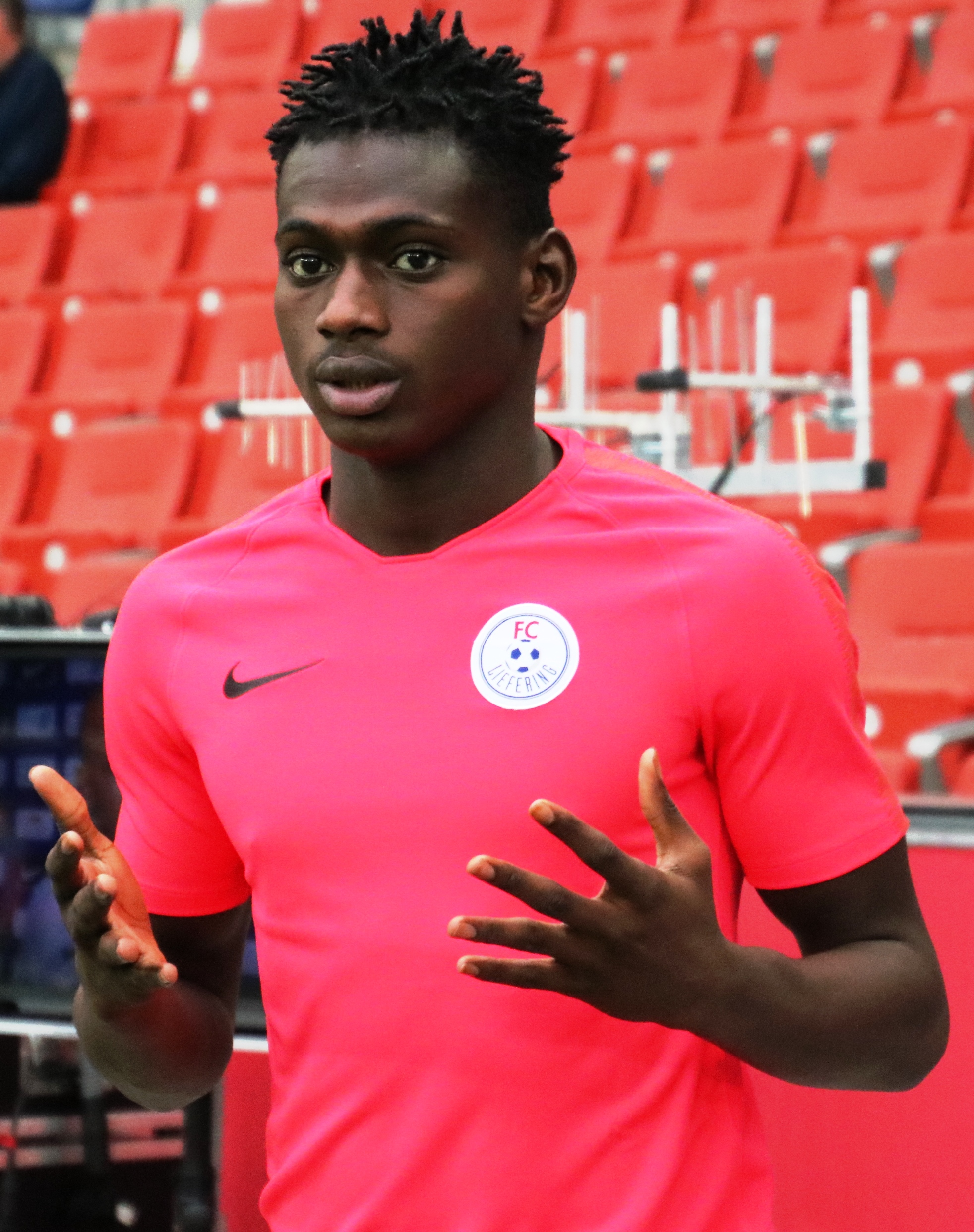
- Diakité with Liefering in 2018

Personal information
- Full name: Ousmane Diakité
- Date of birth: 25 July 2000 (age 26)
- Place of birth: Mali
- Height: 1.89 m (6 ft 2 in)
- Position: Defensive midfielder

Team information
- Current team: West Bromwich Albion
- Number: 17

Youth career
- –2017: Yeelen Olympique

Senior career*
Years	Team	Apps	(Gls)
2017–2018	Yeelen Olympique		
2018–2023	Red Bull Salzburg	0	(0)
2018–2019	→ FC Liefering (loan)	19	(1)
2019–2020	→ Rheindorf Altach (loan)	9	(0)
2021–2022	→ St. Gallen (loan)	13	(2)
2023–2024	TSV Hartberg	46	(2)
2024–	West Bromwich Albion	66	(1)

International career^{‡}
2015	Mali U17	3	(0)
2017–2019	Mali U20	8	(1)
2026–	Mali	3	(0)
- * Club domestic league appearances and goals as of 20 September 2026 ‡ National team caps and goals as of 4 October 2026

Ousmane Diakité (born 25 July 2000) is a Malian professional footballer who plays as a defensive midfielder for EFL Championship club West Bromwich Albion and the Mali national team.

== Club career ==
=== Early career ===
Diakité started his career with the Malian side Yeelen Olympique. In July 2018 he signed a contract with FC Red Bull Salzburg in Austria till May 2023. He also played for the feeder team FC Liefering.

His played his first match for FC Liefering on July 27, 2018 against SV Horn. In this match he was excluded after two yellow cards in minute 39 and 92.

On 4 January 2022, Diakité's loan to Swiss club St. Gallen was terminated early to allow him to return to Red Bull and continue his rehabilitation there, after he suffered a serious knee injury in a St. Gallen game in December.

On 1 February 2023, Diakité joined Hartberg on a permanent deal, signing a contract until the summer of 2024.

=== West Bromwich Albion ===
On 27 June 2024, Diakité joined English Championship side West Bromwich Albion on a two-year deal with the option for a further season. On 10 August, he made his debut for the club, as a substitute, in a 3–1 win against QPR in the league. He scored his first goal for the club in a 2–1 home defeat to Bristol City on 26 December 2025. On 24 June 2026, Diakité signed a new three-year deal with the club, extending his stay until 2029.

== International career ==
With the Mali under-17 team, Diakité was a runner-up at the 2015 FIFA U-17 World Cup. In 2017, he played his first match for the under-20 team.

== Career statistics ==
=== Club ===
As of match played 20 September 2026

Appearances and goals by club, season and competition
Club	Season	League			National cup (Note: Includes Austrian Cup, Swiss Cup, FA Cup)		League cup (Note: Includes EFL Cup)		Other		Total	
Club	Season	Division	Apps	Goals	Apps	Goals	Apps	Goals	Apps	Goals	Apps	Goals
Red Bull Salzburg	2018–19	Austrian Bundesliga	0	0	0	0	—		0	0	0	0
FC Liefering (loan)	2018–19	2. Liga	19	1	0	0	—		—		19	1
Rheindorf Altach (loan)	2019–20	Austrian Bundesliga	9	0	1	0	—		—		10	0
St. Gallen (loan)	2021–22	Swiss Super League	13	2	2	0	—		—		15	2
TSV Hartberg	2022–23	Austrian Bundesliga	15	0	0	0	—		—		15	0
TSV Hartberg	2023–24	Austrian Bundesliga	31	2	3	0	—		—		34	2
TSV Hartberg	Total		46	2	3	0	—		—		49	0
West Bromwich Albion	2024–25	Championship	22	0	1	0	1	0	—		24	0
West Bromwich Albion	2025–26	Championship	36	1	2	0	1	0	—		39	1
West Bromwich Albion	2026–27	Championship	8	0	0	0	2	0	—		10	0
West Bromwich Albion	Total		66	1	3	0	4	0	0	0	73	1
Career total			153	6	9	0	4	0	0	0	166	6

=== International ===
As of match played 4 October 2026

Appearances and goals by national team and year
National team	Year	Apps	Goals
Mali	2026	3	0
Total		3	0
