= Alex Williams (footballer, born 2005) =

Welsh footballer (born 2005)

Personal information
- Full name: Alexander David Williams
- Date of birth: 2 January 2005 (age 21)
- Place of birth: Warwick, England
- Height: 1.78 m (5 ft 10 in)
- Position: Full back

Team information
- Current team: Hibernian (on loan from West Bromwich Albion)
- Number: 12

Youth career
- 2016–2024: West Bromwich Albion

Senior career*
Years	Team	Apps	(Gls)
2024–	West Bromwich Albion	1	(0)
2024	→ Stratford Town (loan)	8	(1)
2026–	→ Hibernian (loan)	1	(0)

International career^{‡}
2020–2021	Wales U16	2	(0)
2021–2022	Wales U17	7	(0)
2023	Wales U18	2	(0)
2023	Wales U19	2	(0)
2024–	Wales U21	9	(0)
- * Club domestic league appearances and goals as of 20:19, 7 November 2026 (UTC) ‡ National team caps and goals as of 11:19, 8 October 2026 (UTC)

Alexander David Williams (born 2 January 2005) is a professional footballer who plays as a full back for Scottish Premiership club Hibernian on loan from EFL Championship club West Bromwich Albion. He is a Wales under-21 international.

== Club career ==
=== West Bromwich Albion ===
Williams joined West Bromwich Albion at under-12s level. On 13 January 2023, he signed his first professional contract with the club, penning a deal until 2025. On 19 September 2024, he signed for Southern League side Stratford Town on a one-month youth loan. On 3 July 2025, he signed a new contract with the club. He made his professional debut for the club on 12 August 2025, starting in a 1–1 draw with Derby County in the EFL Cup which Albion lost on penalties. He made his league debut on 30 August 2025, in a 1–0 win against Stoke City. On 3 October 2025, he signed a new three-year contract with the club until 2028.

==== Hibernian (loan) ====
On 3 September 2026, Williams joined Scottish Premiership side Hibernian on a season-long loan. He made his debut for the club on 12 September 2026, in a 3–0 win against Ross County in the Scottish League Cup. He made his first league appearance on 7 November 2026, in a 4–0 win against Aberdeen.

== International career ==
Williams made his first appearance for a Wales national side as part of the under-16 side, in a 2–0 win over Slovakia in February 2020. He made further appearances for the under-16, 17, 18 and 19 sides between 2020 and 2023.

On 14 March 2024, Williams received his first call-up to the Wales under-21 squad.

== Career statistics ==
As of match played 7 November 2026

Appearances and goals by club, season and competition
Club	Season	League			National Cup (Note: Includes FA Cup, Scottish Cup)		League Cup (Note: Includes EFL Cup, Scottish League Cup)		Other		Total	
Club	Season	Division	Apps	Goals	Apps	Goals	Apps	Goals	Apps	Goals	Apps	Goals
West Bromwich Albion	2024–25	Championship	0	0	0	0	0	0	—		0	0
West Bromwich Albion	2025–26	Championship	1	0	0	0	1	0	—		2	0
West Bromwich Albion	2026–27	Championship	0	0	0	0	1	0	—		1	0
West Bromwich Albion	Total		1	0	0	0	2	0	0	0	3	0
Stratford Town (loan)	2024–25	Southern League Premier Division Central	8	1	0	0	—		1 (Note: Appearances in FA Trophy)	0	9	1
Hibernian (loan)	2026–27	Scottish Premiership	1	0	0	0	1	0	—		2	0
Career total			10	1	0	0	3	0	1	0	14	1

== Honours ==
West Bromwich Albion U23

- Premier League Cup: 2021–22
