= Alexander Williams =

Alexander Williams may refer to:

- Alexander Williams (artist) (1846–1930), Irish painter
- Alexander Williams (cartoonist) (born 1967), animator and cartoonist
- Alexander S. Williams (1839–1917), NYPD police inspector
- Alexander Williams Jr. (born 1948), U.S. federal judge
- Alexander James Williams (born 1981), New Zealand rugby union international
- Alexander B. Williams (1815–?), American merchant and politician from New York
- Alexander Williams (British Army officer) (1910–1994), British Army general
- Sandy Williams (Alexander Balos Williams, 1906–1991), American trombonist

== See also ==
- Alex Williams (disambiguation)
- Al Williams (disambiguation)
- Alexander (disambiguation)
- Williams (disambiguation)
- William Alexander (disambiguation)
