= Callum Styles =

English-born Hungarian footballer (born 2000)

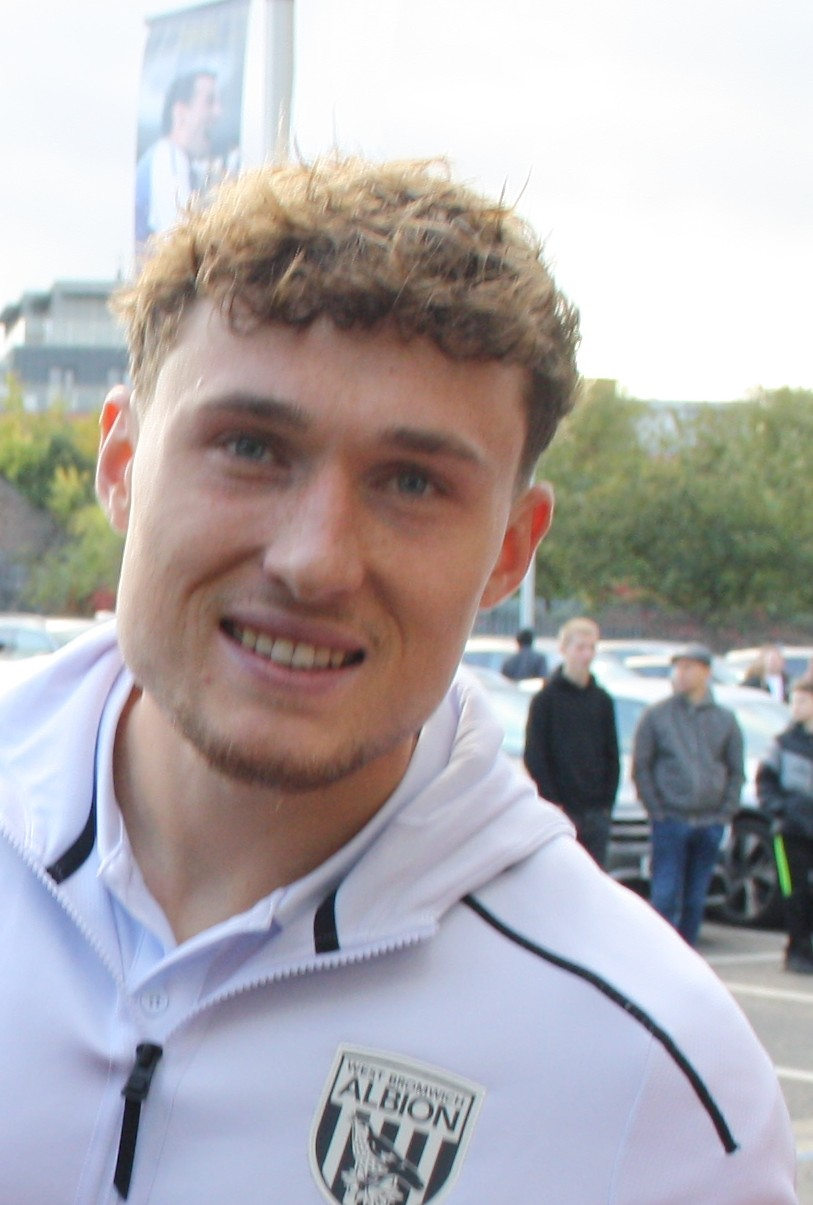
- Styles with West Bromwich Albion in 2025

Personal information
- Full name: Callum John Styles
- Date of birth: 27 March 2000 (age 26)
- Place of birth: Bury, England
- Height: 5 ft 8 in (1.73 m)
- Positions: Left-back; midfielder; winger

Team information
- Current team: West Bromwich Albion
- Number: 4

Youth career
- –2016: Burnley

Senior career*
| Years | Team | Apps | (Gls) |
| 2016–2018 | Bury | 26 | (0) |
| 2018–2024 | Barnsley | 135 | (12) |
| 2018 | → Bury (loan) | 15 | (0) |
| 2022–2023 | → Millwall (loan) | 22 | (1) |
| 2024 | → Sunderland (loan) | 12 | (0) |
| 2024– | West Bromwich Albion | 94 | (6) |

International career^{‡}
| 2022– | Hungary | 32 | (0) |
- * Club domestic league appearances and goals as of 14:48, 18 November 2026 (UTC) ‡ National team caps and goals as of 00:30, 18 November 2026 (UTC)

Callum John Styles born 27 March 2000) is a professional footballer who plays as a left-back, midfielder or winger for EFL Championship club West Bromwich Albion. Born in England, he plays for the Hungary national team.

== Club career ==
Styles developed through the Burnley academy but failed to earn a professional contract and was released aged 16.

=== Bury ===
Styles joined League One club Bury and made his debut professional team in their final game of the season against Southend United on 8 May 2016. He came on as a 75th-minute substitute for Anthony Dudley as the team won 3–2. In making his debut, Styles became the first player born in the new millennium to make an appearance in the Football League. Bury were later deducted three points after it was found Styles was not properly registered when he made his debut.

Styles signed a professional contract with Bury on 21 February 2017, signing a two-and-a-half-year deal.

=== Barnsley ===
On 6 August 2018, Styles signed for League One club Barnsley for £500,000, signing a four-year contract, though returned to Bury on loan until the January transfer window. He made 21 appearances in all competitions for Bury before returning to his parent club.

Styles made his debut for Barnsley as a substitute on 9 March 2019 in a 2–0 home victory against Accrington Stanley, replacing Mamadou Thiam. He scored his first goal for the Tykes, netting away at Brentford in a 2–1 triumph on the final day of the following season, helping the Yorkshire outfit retain their Championship status.

==== 2023–24 season ====
On 5 August 2023, he played his first match of the season in a 7–0 victory over Port Vale. In an interview, Neill Collins said that he was sure that Championship clubs would be interested in signing Styles. In the following match, he played the full 90 minutes of a 1–1 draw away to Bristol Rovers. On 23 December, he provided an assist for John McAtee from the middle of his half in a 2–1 home win over Stevenage

=== Millwall ===
On deadline day, 1 September 2022, Styles signed a new contract at Barnsley until 2025 before joining Millwall on a season-long loan. On 22 October 2022, he scored his first and only goal for Millwall against West Bromwich Albion at The Den in the 2022–23 EFL Championship.

In February 2023, he suffered an injury in his quadriceps during training. However, he played in the subsequent match against Cardiff City In the following training, he felt something strange in his leg and the physio scanned and found out that his injury is more serious than it was previously thought. He had to miss three months. On 18 April 2023, he returned and played against Birmingham City in the 2022–23 EFL Championship season.

==== Sunderland ====
On 1 February 2024, Styles joined Sunderland on an initial loan deal until the end of the season. He became the second Hungarian to play for Sunderland, after Márton Fülöp. On 24 February 2024, he debuted in Sunderland in a 2–1 defeat against Swansea City. On 13 April 2024, he gave an assist to Pierre Ekwah in a 1–0 victory over West Bromwich Albion at The Hawthorns.

=== West Bromwich Albion ===
On 24 August 2024, Styles signed for West Bromwich Albion on a four-year contract. He debuted in a 1–0 victory over Swansea City in the fourth match round of the 2024–25 Championship. He entered the pitch as a substitute for Karlan Grant in the 82nd minute. On 1 January 2025, he scored his first goal for West Brom in a 3–1 victory over Preston North End.

He was named West Bromwich Albion Player of the Season for the 2025–26.

== International career ==
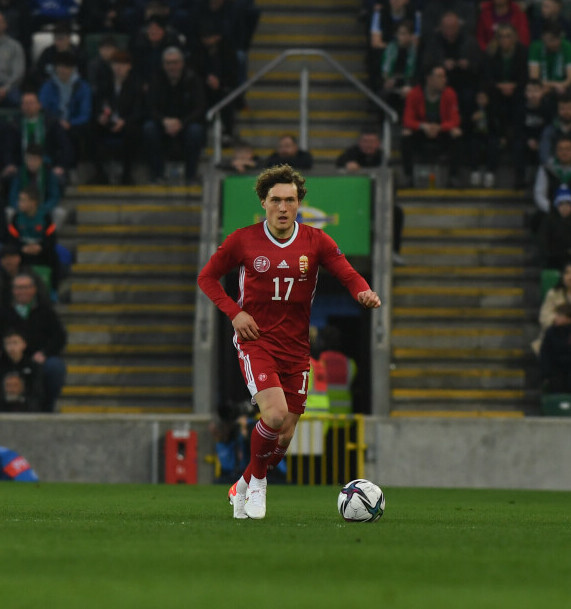
Styles with Hungary in 2022

Although born in England, Styles was also eligible to play international football for Ukraine and Hungary through his grandparents. On 14 March 2022, he was included in the Hungary squad for matches against Serbia and Northern Ireland. On 24 March 2022, he made his debut for Hungary against Serbia at the Puskás Aréna. He came on as a substitute for Zsolt Nagy in the 70th minute.

On 14 June 2022, he started Hungary's 4–0 victory over England in the 2020–21 UEFA Nations League at Molineux Stadium in Wolverhampton.

On 14 May 2024, Styles was named in Hungary's squad for UEFA Euro 2024. On 8 June 2024, he got injured in a friendly match against Israel at the Nagyerdei Stadion. He made his only appearance at the tournament on 24 June, starting in midfield as Hungary beat Scotland 1–0 in their final Group A match.

On 27 August 2024, Marco Rossi, the head coach of the national team, announced the squad for the matches of the 2024–25 UEFA Nations League against Germany and Bosnia and Herzegovina and Styles was not included. One possible reason for his omission was that Styles did not play in his club.

He returned to the national team, when Hungary faced Ireland and hosted Portugal in the 2026 FIFA World Cup qualification. Based on the two matches, Styles had the third best index in the national team followed by Varga and Orbán.

== Personal life ==
His first visit to Hungary was cancelled due to the outbreak of the COVID-19 pandemic. He said: "I was meant to go with my girlfriend just after lockdown started. We had a trip to Budapest booked and a few weeks before, we went into lockdown and had to cancel it." In an interview with the BBC, Styles stated that in 2020, he had found out that his grandmother was Hungarian. Poya Asbaghi, former manager of Barnsley, said in an interview that it is a big honour for Styles to represent Hungary.

In an interview with Nemzeti Sport, he said that the reason why he did not speak Hungarian is that his grandmother used to talk about Hungary, but did not teach him any of the language.

In January 2024, he had his appendix removed for appendicitis in a private hospital. He said in an interview with Nemzeti Sport that he spends most time with Botond Balogh and Loic Nego during his time with the national team. He also said that Dominik Szoboszlai is not only a captain on the pitch but in the changing room too.

== Career statistics ==
=== Club ===
As of match played 7 November 2026

Appearances and goals by club, season and competition
| Club | Season | League | | | FA Cup | | League Cup | | Other | | Total | |
| Club | Season | Division | Apps | Goals | Apps | Goals | Apps | Goals | Apps | Goals | Apps | Goals |
|---|---|---|---|---|---|---|---|---|---|---|---|---|
| Bury | 2015–16 | League One | 1 | 0 | 0 | 0 | 0 | 0 | 0 | 0 | 1 | 0 |
| Bury | 2016–17 | League One | 13 | 0 | 0 | 0 | 0 | 0 | 0 | 0 | 13 | 0 |
| Bury | 2017–18 | League One | 11 | 0 | 0 | 0 | 0 | 0 | 1 (Note: Appearances in EFL Trophy) | 0 | 12 | 0 |
| Bury | 2018–19 | League Two | 1 | 0 | — | | — | | — | | 1 | 0 |
| Bury (loan) | 2018–19 | League Two | 15 | 0 | 1 | 0 | 1 | 0 | 3 | 0 | 20 | 0 |
| Bury (loan) | Total | | 41 | 0 | 1 | 0 | 1 | 0 | 4 | 0 | 47 | 0 |
| Barnsley | 2018–19 | League One | 7 | 0 | 0 | 0 | 0 | 0 | — | | 7 | 0 |
| Barnsley | 2019–20 | Championship | 17 | 1 | 0 | 0 | 1 | 0 | — | | 18 | 1 |
| Barnsley | 2020–21 | Championship | 42 | 4 | 3 | 1 | 3 | 0 | 2 (Note: Appearance(s) in EFL Championship play-offs) | 0 | 50 | 5 |
| Barnsley | 2021–22 | Championship | 43 | 3 | 2 | 0 | 1 | 0 | — | | 46 | 3 |
| Barnsley | 2022–23 | League One | 6 | 1 | 0 | 0 | 2 | 0 | — | | 8 | 1 |
| Barnsley | 2023–24 | League One | 20 | 3 | 1 | 0 | 0 | 0 | 1 | 0 | 22 | 3 |
| Barnsley | Total | | 135 | 12 | 6 | 1 | 7 | 0 | 3 | 0 | 151 | 13 |
| Millwall (loan) | 2022–23 | Championship | 22 | 1 | 0 | 0 | 0 | 0 | — | | 22 | 1 |
| Sunderland (loan) | 2023–24 | Championship | 12 | 0 | — | | — | | — | | 12 | 0 |
| West Bromwich Albion | 2024–25 | Championship | 34 | 3 | 1 | 0 | 0 | 0 | — | | 35 | 3 |
| West Bromwich Albion | 2025–26 | Championship | 45 | 0 | 1 | 0 | 1 | 0 | — | | 47 | 0 |
| West Bromwich Albion | 2026–27 | Championship | 15 | 3 | 0 | 0 | 2 | 0 | — | | 6 | 1 |
| West Bromwich Albion | Total | | 94 | 6 | 2 | 0 | 3 | 0 | — | | 99 | 9 |
| Career total | | | 304 | 19 | 9 | 1 | 11 | 0 | 7 | 0 | 331 | 20 |

=== International ===
As of match played 17 November 2026

Appearances and goals by national team and year
| National team | Year | Apps | Goals |
|---|---|---|---|
| Hungary | 2022 | 11 | 0 |
| Hungary | 2023 | 7 | 0 |
| Hungary | 2024 | 5 | 0 |
| Hungary | 2025 | 7 | 0 |
| Hungary | 2026 | 2 | 0 |
| Total | | 32 | 0 |

== Honours ==
Bury

- EFL League Two runner-up: 2018–19

Individual

- West Bromwich Albion Player of the Season: 2025–26
