= Cole Deeming =

English footballer (born 2007)

Personal information
- Full name: Cole Thomas Deeming
- Date of birth: 19 January 2007 (age 19)
- Place of birth: Halesowen, England
- Height: 1.82 m (6 ft 0 in)
- Position: Midfielder

Team information
- Current team: Hartlepool United (on loan from West Bromwich Albion)
- Number: 42

Youth career
- 2013–2024: West Bromwich Albion

Senior career*
Years	Team	Apps	(Gls)
2024–	West Bromwich Albion	0	(0)
2025–2026	→ Truro City (loan)	4	(1)
2026	→ Cheltenham Town (loan)	17	(0)
2026–	→ Hartlepool United (loan)	13	(1)
- * Club domestic league appearances and goals as of 23:19, 21 November 2026 (UTC)

Cole Thomas Deeming (born 19 January 2007) is an English professional footballer who plays as a midfielder for National League club Hartlepool United on loan from EFL Championship club West Bromwich Albion.

== Career ==
=== West Bromwich Albion ===
Deeming joined West Bromwich Albion at the age of six. On 3 April 2024, he signed his first professional contract with the club, penning a two-and-a-half-year deal. He was included in the pre-season squad with the first team ahead of the 2024–25 season. On 13 August 2024, he made his professional debut for the club, in a 2–1 defeat to Fleetwood Town in the EFL Cup.

On 19 November 2025, Deeming joined National League side Truro City on a month-long loan. He made his debut for the club on 22 November 2025, in a 3–2 defeat to Sutton United. On 18 December 2025, his loan was then extended for another month. He scored his first goal for the club on 30 December 2025, in a 1–1 draw with Forest Green Rovers.

On 21 January 2026, Deeming joined League Two side Cheltenham Town on loan until the end of the season. He made his debut for the club on 24 January 2026, in a 2–0 defeat to Grimsby Town.

On 4 September 2026, Deeming signed a new contract extension to keep him with West Brom until the summer of 2028 before joining National League side Hartlepool United on loan until January 2027. He made his Hartlepool debut the following day as a 70th minute substitute in a 1–0 home win against Woking.

== Career statistics ==
As of match played 21 November 2026

Appearances and goals by club, season and competition
Club	Season	League			FA Cup		EFL Cup		Other		Total	
Club	Season	Division	Apps	Goals	Apps	Goals	Apps	Goals	Apps	Goals	Apps	Goals
West Bromwich Albion	2024–25	Championship	0	0	0	0	1	0	—		1	0
West Bromwich Albion	2025–26	Championship	0	0	0	0	0	0	—		0	0
West Bromwich Albion	2026–27	Championship	0	0	0	0	0	0	—		0	0
West Bromwich Albion	Total		0	0	0	0	1	0	0	0	1	0
Truro City (loan)	2025–26	National League	4	1	0	0	—		2 (Note: One appearance in FA Trophy, one appearance in National League Cup)	0	6	1
Cheltenham Town (loan)	2025–26	League Two	17	0	0	0	0	0	0	0	17	0
Hartlepool United (loan)	2026–27	National League	13	1	1	0	—		0	0	14	1
Career total			34	2	1	0	1	0	2	0	38	2
