= Ollie Bostock =

Welsh footballer (born 2007)

Personal information
- Full name: Oliver David Bostock
- Date of birth: 20 February 2007 (age 19)
- Place of birth: Kingston upon Thames, England
- Position: Winger

Team information
- Current team: Boston United
- Number: 15

Youth career
- 2013–2025: West Bromwich Albion

Senior career*
| Years | Team | Apps | (Gls) |
| 2025– | West Bromwich Albion | 7 | (1) |
| 2026– | → Boston United (loan) | 4 | (1) |

International career^{‡}
| 2023 | Wales U16 | 3 | (1) |
| 2023–2024 | Wales U17 | 12 | (3) |
| 2024– | Wales U19 | 6 | (1) |
| 2026– | Wales U21 | 4 | (0) |
- * Club domestic league appearances and goals as of 12:25, 13 October 2026 (UTC) ‡ National team caps and goals as of 16:01, 7 October 2026 (UTC)

Oliver David Bostock (born 20 February 2007) is a professional footballer who plays as a winger for National League club Boston United, on loan from EFL Championship club West Bromwich Albion. He is a Wales under-21 international.

== Club Career ==
=== West Bromwich Albion ===
Bostock joined the West Bromwich Albion academy aged six. In March 2024, he signed a first professional contract. At the end of the 2023–24 season, he was named as Academy Player of the Season.

Following an impressive performance in the FA Youth Cup, Bostock found himself named in a number of first-team squads across the second-half of the 2024–25 season. Despite not having made an appearance however, he was tipped by youth coach James Morrison to continue to make an impression.

On 10 September 2025, he signed a new two-year deal with the Baggies. Shortly after, on 4 October, he made his senior debut as a late substitute in a 3–0 Championship defeat to Millwall. His FA Cup debut followed later in the season, as Bostock replaced Daryl Dike in the 60th minute against Swansea City. His assist for Jed Wallace's extra time goal, and then later winning penalty in the penalty shootout, gave West Bromwich Albion a 2-2 (5-6 on penalties) victory over Swansea City. He was named as the club's Young Player of the Season for the 2025–26 season.

==== Boston United (loan) ====
In September 2026, Bostock signed for National League club Boston United on loan until January 2027. He made his debut for the club as a substitute in a 3–1 win over Forest Green Rovers.

== International career ==
In March 2026, Bostock was called up to the Wales under-21 squad for the first time. In May 2026, he was called up to the Wales senior squad for the first time.

== Personal life ==
Born in Kingston upon Thames, Bostock's family moved to Lichfield when he was young.

== Career statistics ==
As of 7 October 2026

Appearances and goals by club, season and competition
| Club | Season | League | | | FA Cup | | League Cup | | Other | | Total | |
| Club | Season | Division | Apps | Goals | Apps | Goals | Apps | Goals | Apps | Goals | Apps | Goals |
|---|---|---|---|---|---|---|---|---|---|---|---|---|
| West Bromwich Albion | 2025–26 | Championship | 7 | 1 | 2 | 0 | 0 | 0 | — | | 9 | 1 |
| West Bromwich Albion | 2026–27 | Championship | 0 | 0 | 0 | 0 | 1 | 0 | — | | 1 | 0 |
| Boston United (loan) | 2026–27 | National League | 4 | 1 | 0 | 0 | 0 | 0 | 0 | 0 | 4 | 1 |
| Career total | | | 11 | 2 | 2 | 0 | 1 | 0 | 0 | 0 | 14 | 2 |

== Honours ==
Individual

- West Bromwich Albion Young Player of the Season: 2025–26
- West Bromwich Albion Academy Player of the Season: 2023–24
