= Bill Alexander (Canadian football) =

Canadian football player (1924–1997)

Profile
- Position: Halfback

Personal information
- Born: June 12, 1924; Calgary, Alberta, Canada
- Died: June 17, 1997 (aged 73); Calgary, Alberta, Canada

Career history
- 1946–1947: Calgary Stampeders

William John Alexander (June 12, 1924 – June 17, 1997), better known as Bill Alexander, was a Canadian professional football halfback who played for the Calgary Stampeders of the Canadian Football League. He played nine games for the Stampeders from 1946 to 1947. He died at Rockyview General Hospital in Calgary in June 1997, five days after turning 73.
