= List of Canadian soldiers executed for military offences =

A total of 26 Canadian soldiers were executed for military offences during World War I and World War II. 25 occurred during World War I for charges such as desertion or cowardice: 23 were posthumously pardoned on 16 August 2006, while the remaining two men were executed for murder and would have been executed under civilian law.

The only Canadian soldier executed in World War II was Private Harold Pringle, who was executed after Victory in Europe Day in Italy on charges of desertion and accessory to murder.

== First World War ==
During the First World War, members of the Canadian Expeditionary Force were subject to British military discipline, which allowed execution by firing squad for crimes such as desertion or cowardice. During the war, 25 Canadian soldiers were executed for purely military offences. Excluding the two who were found guilty of murder, Veteran Affairs Minister Ron Duhamel announced on December 11, 2001 that executed soldiers would have their names added to Canada's Books of Remembrance housed in Parliament Hill.

On 16 August 2006, British Defence Secretary Des Browne announced that the government would issue full pardons for all 306 Commonwealth soldiers (including the twenty-three Canadians) who were executed under these circumstances during World War I.

=== Executed for Desertion ===
==== Sgt. William Alexander ====
William Alexander was born in the UK during 1880, and served for 8 years in the British Army before emigrating to Canada. When the First World War started in August 1914, Alexander volunteered for service in the Canadian Army. Given his previous military service, Alexander was made a Sergeant in the 10th Battalion. After arriving in France during 1915, Sergeant Alexander fought with the battalion at the 2nd Battle of Ypres (April 1915), Festubert (May 1915) and Mount Sorrel (1916).

Following his recovery from an inflamed knee, Alexander rejoined his battalion in time for its involvement in the attack on Hill 70, which started at 04:25 on 15 August 1917. This attack was intended to act as a diversion and draw some of the German forces from the ongoing battles at Passchendaele. Because of the severe casualties suffered by the 10th Battalion, CQMS Alexander was ordered forward to take over as Platoon Sergeant of D Company; in readiness for this platoon to take part in a further attack. However, Alexander was nowhere to be found and a Corporal had to lead the Company.

Two days later, on 17 August 1917, the 10th Battalion was pulled out of the front line. It had suffered some 400 casualties.

It was not until 19 August 1917 that CQMS Alexander was found in the village used by the 10th Battalion as a billet before the attack on Hill 70. After admitting that he had gone sick, but not reported it to an officer, and the absence of any marks on his person, Alexander was arrested and charged with desertion.

Following his trial on 29 September 1917, Alexander (age 37) was executed by firing squad on 18 October 1917. His remains are located in Barlin Communal Cemetery Extension (Pas de Calais), Plot II, Row D, Grave 43.

An account of Alexander's execution was written by Canon Frederick Scott in his book The Great War as I Saw It. (Although Canon Scott does not name Alexander, the date of this execution, October 1917 and Scott's mention that the condemned soldier had no next of kin makes Alexander, rather than Private Thomas L. Moles, the subject.)

Alexander is listed in the Canadian Book of Remembrance on page 603.

==== Lance-Bombardier Frederick Arnold ====
Born in Cleveland, Ohio on 25 April 1890, Frederick Stanley Arnold initially served in the US Army before enlisting in the Canadian Field Artillery in September 1914.

Once stationed in France, Arnold fought at the Battle of Festubert and the Battle of Givenchy, twice being admitted to hospital, once for simple illness, and then to be treated for shell shock. After his discharge, Arnold disappeared on 5 June 1916, and was arrested at a nearby port dressed in civilian clothes. He was court-martialled on 5 July 1916, and executed at 04:37 on 25 July 1916. He is buried in Boulogne Eastern Cemetery, Plot VIII, Row A, Grave 137.

==== Pte. Fortunat Auger ====
Born in Montreal in December 1890, Fortunat Auger joined the CEF's 14th Battalion in September 1914.

Auger was present during both the Second Battle of Ypres and the Battle of Festubert in 1915. After the 14th Battalion was transferred following his battalion's move to Ploegsteert Wood that summer, Auger's conduct became increasingly belligerent.

He was twice charged with going AWOL, before disappearing for two days in December and returning to find himself charged with desertion. His charge was lessened to AWOL once again, but he was sentenced to serve 12 months hard labour. His sentence was suspended a month later, and he was returned to his battalion, from which he immediately left. He was arrested three days later, on January 11, and sentenced to death for desertion.

The 25-year-old Private was executed by firing squad at 05:43 on 26 March 1916, and his remains were buried in Trois Arbres Cemetery, Plot III, Row H, Grave 5.

==== Pte. Harold Carter ====
Born on 26 March 1894 in Toronto, Ontario, Harold George Carter enlisted in the 59th Battalion in March 1915. In January 1916, he was charged with going AWOL.

The Battalion was disbanded upon reaching England at the end of 1916, and its troops were used to re-man other units who had taken high casualty rates during the war. Carter was transferred to the 73rd Battalion, part of the 4th Canadian Division.

He was again found AWOL, during the September Battle of Flers-Courcelette, and was found guilty of desertion and sentenced to death. His sentence was commuted to 10 years' imprisonment. After serving six months, his sentence was suspended, and he was re-attached to his unit on March 16, 1917.

Within three weeks, Carter once again went AWOL, this time just before the Battle of Vimy Ridge, eluding military police for five days before being re-captured. He was court-martialled and found guilty of desertion. Sentenced to death, Carter was executed by firing squad on 20 April 1917.

Carter's remains are today located in Villers Station Cemetery, Plot X, Row A, Grave 7.

==== Pte. Gustave Comté ====
Born on 24 February 1895 in Montreal, Gustave Comté enlisted in the 57th Battalion in September 1915. Comté travelled with the battalion to France, but was transferred to the 22nd Battalion (aka "Van Doo", then part of the 5th Canadian Brigade CEF) because of their recent loss of infantry.

Private Comté went missing just before the attack on Vimy Ridge began, on April 4, 1917, as the 22nd began moving to the front lines through Gouy-Servins. He was found in Le Havre on 18 May, and a court martial sentenced him to death for desertion.

At 04:45 on 3 July 1917, Comté was executed by firing squad. His remains are now located in Aix-Noulette Communal Cemetery Extension, Plot I, Row F, Grave 20.

==== Pte. Arthur Dagesse ====
Arthur Charles Dagesse was born in New Bedford MA in 1886. On 23 September 1914, one month after the outbreak of war, Dagesse enlisted in the Canadian Expeditionary Force (CEF) under the name Dagasse. His conduct as a soldier started badly and continued in poor fashion, with no fewer than fifteen convictions, thirteen for absence and two for drunkenness.

On 4 April 1917, just before his unit's participation in the Vimy Ridge attack, Dagesse went absent until his arrest in Paris on 29 April 1917. While awaiting trial for this offence, Dagesse escaped custody and remained absent for five months before being re-arrested in Paris on 4 October 1917. When he was arrested for the second time, Dagesse was wearing the uniform of a Sergeant in the Royal Army Medical Corps (RAMC).

Following his court-martial on 26 February 1918, Dagasse was found guilty of two counts of desertion and sentenced to death.

At 06:37 on 15 March 1918, Dagesse (aged 31) was executed by firing squad. His remains are now located in Lapugnoy Military Cemetery, Plot VIII, Row B, Grave 8.

==== Pte. Léopold Delisle ====
Léopold Delisle was born in Montreal in 1893. Following the outbreak of war, Delisle tried to enlist three times before he was finally accepted for overseas service in April 1915. One month later, Delisle sailed with the 22nd (French-Canadian) Battalion.

Delisle had a number of offences on his conduct sheet.

Date	Offence	Punishment
25 June 1915	Refusing to obey an order	14 days' Field Punishment No 1
1 September 1915	Drunk & absent from parade	Fined $2
5 November 1915	Insubordination	7 days' Field Punishment No 2
27 November 1915	Absent from parade	Fined 1 days' pay
8 January 1916	Refusing to go on parade	28 days' Field Punishment No 1
22 March 1916	Striking a superior officer	1 years' Hard Labour
5 September 1917	Outside area without pass	3 days' Field Punishment No 1
10 September 1917	AWOL from drill parade	21 days' Field Punishment No 1

On 29 March 1918 Delisle's unit was ordered forward to attempt to stem the German advance on Arras, but when the roll call was made, Delisle was absent. Delisle was arrested just outside Arras five days later. Delisle's court-martial found him guilty of desertion and sentenced him to be shot dead.

At 04:24 on 21 May 1918, Delisle (aged 25) was executed by firing squad. His remains are now located in Bellacourt Military Cemetery, Plot II, Row J, Grave 6.

==== Pte. Edward Fairburn ====
Edward Fairburn was born in St. Catharines, Ontario on 21 September 1895. After enlisting in November 1915, Fairburn was sent to France as part of a reinforcement for the 18th (Western Ontario) Battalion.

After a period of service, Fairburn went missing during the week of 9–16 April 1917 and remained missing for 10 months before being arrested just north of Arras.

On 2 March 1918, Fairburn (aged 23) was executed by firing squad. His remains are now located in Villers Station Cemetery, Plot XI, Row B, Grave 23, 11 kilometres northwest of Arras.

==== Pte. Stephen McDermott Fowles ====
Stephen McDermott Fowles was born on 13 June 1897 in Winnipeg. On February 16, 1916, he enlisted in the 107th Battalion, which sailed for England in September 1916. He was later sent to France as part of a reinforcement of the 44th Canadian Infantry Battalion.

Private Fowles was treated for a self inflicted gunshot wound to the left hand on February 3, 1916, and eight days later he was sent back into the field. Within a year of his enlistment, he was court-martialled for desertion and found guilty. His sentence of death was reduced during the confirmation process to 10 years' imprisonment, which was itself later reduced to a suspended sentence and he was returned to his unit.

Despite these events, Private Fowles deserted and on 29 December 1917 was again sentenced to death. For a second time, the sentence was commuted to a suspended sentence. Given the need to combat the German offensive, he was returned to his unit.

Shortly after rejoining his unit, Private Fowles deserted for a 3rd time and was not detained until he turned himself in on 2 May 1918. He was court-martialled for desertion, found guilty and sentenced to death. At 03:50 on 19 June 1918, Stephen McDermott Fowles was executed by firing squad. He had just turned 21. His remains are now located in Villers Station Cemetery, Plot XIII, Row B, Grave 1.

==== Pte. John Maurice Higgins ====
John Maurice Higgins was born on 26 September 1891 in Charlottetown, before moving with his parents to Toronto.

After enlisting in the 87th Battalion in Montreal, Higgins sailed with the battalion to England during April 1916.

Date	Offence	Punishment
10 May 1916	Absent Without Leave (AWOL)	Fined 3 days' pay
12 May 1916	Absent Without Leave (AWOL)	12 days' Field Punishment No.1 and transferred as a reinforcement to the 1st (Western Ontario) Battalion in Belgium

Private Higgins took part in the heavy fighting at Mount Sorrel and went with his unit into the fighting at Courcelette in September 1916. During this battle, Higgins went absent, and was arrested by French Police 16 days later. This time, Private Higgins was charged with desertion.

Higgins escaped from custody while awaiting his court-martial but was rearrested five days later. After his court-martial, Higgins was found guilty of both counts of desertion and sentenced to death by firing squad.

At 07:11 on 7 December 1916, Higgins was executed by firing squad. His remains are now located in Quatre-Vents Cemetery, Plot I, Row B, Grave 2.

==== Pte. Henry Hesey Kerr ====
Henry Hesey Kerr was born in Montreal on 4 September 1891.

After his battalion had arrived in England, Kerr was punished for five periods of AWOL on 10 June 1915, 27 November 1915, 3 December 1915, 17 June 1916 and 3 January 1916, being fined two days pay for each offence.

After entering France and joining the 7th (British Columbia) Battalion, Kerr's conduct continued to decline. After several more warnings about his conduct, Kerr rejoined his unit in October 1916 as it prepared to attack Regina Trench as part of the Somme Offensive.

However, Kerr went absent after being warned he was required for duty in the front line. 24 hours later, Kerr was arrested when he was discovered in some billets located some miles behind the front lines.

On 7 November 1916, Kerr was charged with desertion. His court-martial found him guilty and sentenced him to death. At 06:45 on 21 November 1916, Kerr was executed by firing squad. Private Kerr's remains are now located in Quatre-Vents Military Cemetery, Plot III, Row A, Grave 9.

==== Pte. Joseph LaLancette ====
Joseph LaLancette was born on 1 September 1895 in London, Ontario. After enlisting in Quebec City, LaLancette arrived in France as part of a reinforcement of the 22nd Battalion.

On December 29, 1916, absent from trenches for four hours, causing another man to take his place. Sentenced to 14 days F.P.

On 6 April 1917, just before the attack on Vimy Ridge, LaLancette went absent and was shortly arrested together with Gustave Comté. Both soldiers faced separate courts-martial, charged with desertion. Both LaLancette and Comté were found guilty and sentenced to death.

At 04:45 on 3 July 1917, LaLancette and Comté were executed by firing squad. LaLancette's remains are now located in Aix-Noulette Communal Cemetery Extension, Plot I, Row F, Grave 21.

==== Pte. Côme Laliberté ====
Côme Laliberté was born on 24 March 1893 in Lotbinière (Quebec). During March 1915 he enlisted in the 41st Battalion, travelling with them to England in June 1915. Before the end of 1915, Laliberté already had several entries on his conduct sheet.

Date	Offence	Punishment
29 June 1915	Drunkenness	Fined 2 days' pay
5 August 1915	Absent Without Leave (AWOL)	Fined 2 days' pay
10 September 1915	Out of barracks with a pass and improperly dressed	7 days' Field Punishment No. 1

On moving up to the trenches during the Summer of 1916, as part of the 3rd Battalion contribution to the battles around Mount Sorrel, Laliberté left the ranks and refused to go forward. He was tried for desertion, found guilty and sentenced to death by shooting.

On 4 August 1916, Laliberté (aged 23) was executed by firing squad. His remains are now located in Poperinghe New Military Cemetery, Plot II, Row H, Grave 3.

==== Pte. Norman Ling ====
Wilson Norman Ling was born on 5 July 1896 in Toronto.

During May 1915, Ling enlisted in the 59th Battalion, which sailed for England later that year. During 1916, Ling was sent as part of a reinforcement of the 2nd (Eastern Ontario) Battalion in France.

Date	Offence	Punishment
22 June 1916 and 8 July 1916	Absent Without Leave (AWOL)	90 days' Field Punishment No. 1
October 1916	Absent Without Leave (AWOL)	2 years' imprisonment with hard labour, suspended

On 21 June 1917, Ling again went absent and was arrested by the military police in Mazingarbe almost one year later. After his arrest, Ling gave a false name and had another soldier's paybook in his possession. At his court-martial for desertion, Ling was found guilty and sentenced to death by shooting.

On 12 August 1918, Ling (aged 22) was executed by firing squad. His remains are now located in Cerisy-Gailly Military Cemetery, Plot II, Row N. Grave 20.

==== Pte. Harold Lodge ====
Born 22 December 1897 in Toronto, Harold Edward James Lodge enlisted in the CEF in April 1915. Lodge was stationed in France, as part of the 19th Battalion.

Lodge took a quick leave of absence from his unit in November 1917, during preparations for the Battle of Passchendaele, and was warned by an officer that if he tried again it would be considered desertion, yet nonetheless went AWOL again that same night. He got his hands on a British Red Cross corporal's uniform, and hid in Boulogne until his arrest.

He escaped detention, while awaiting his court-martial hearing in December. However he was found by Military Police three weeks later, aboard a sailing ship about to leave France. Being returned to detention aboard a train, Pte. Lodge once again escaped, but was quickly apprehended.

His court martial finally took place on 23 February 1918, charged with four counts of desertion. He was found guilty and sentenced to death by shooting. On 13 March, he was executed by firing squad. His remains are located in Noeux-les-Mines Communal Cemetery Extension, Plot IV, Row B, Grave 5.

==== Pte. Thomas Moles ====
Thomas Lionel Moles was born in Brompton Reigh (Somerset) on 17 November 1891. He served for four years in the Somerset Light Infantry. After leaving the British Army, Moles emigrated to Canada, where in July 1915, Moles enlisted in the 54th (Kootenay British Columbia) Battalion. The 54th Battalion for England in 1915, entering France in August 1916.

Moles had a poor conduct sheet, with four convictions for AWOL and several convictions for drunkenness.

During October 1917, Moles was ordered to rejoin his company which was about to go into action. Instead of going forward, Moles went to a village in the rear areas. He was eventually arrested three weeks later, and charged with desertion.

At his court-martial, Moles was found guilty and sentenced to death. At 05:30 on 22 October 1917, Moles was executed by firing squad. His remains are located in Ypres Reservoir Cemetery, Plot I, Row H, Grave 76.

==== Pte. Eugene Perry ====
Born April 1, 1896 in Bouctouche, New Brunswick, Pte. Eugene Perry enlisted in the 41st Battalion in October 1915. He was stationed in Belgium as part of the 22nd Battalion, and later fought at the Battle of the Somme before moving with the unit to the Vimy area.

On April 2, 1917, Perry was given a warning for missing duty on the front line, and disappeared shortly afterwards.

He was arrested approximately 7 hours later at a nearby village. His court-martial found him guilty of desertion and sentenced him to death by firing squad. His remains are located in Ecoivres Military Cemetery, Plot VI, Row C, Grave 7.

==== Pte. Edward James Reynolds ====
Edward James Reynolds was born on 2 January 1896 in Toronto. During April 1915, Reynolds enlisted in the 35th Battalion. By November 1915, Reynolds was a member of the 3rd Battalion in the line near Ploegsteert.

On 25 July 1916, the Germans exploded a mine under a portion of the front line called "The Bluff". The 3rd Battalion was ordered forward to plug the resulting gap in the front line. However, Reynolds fell out from his platoon only to be found 2 days later at his battalion's transport lines. Reynolds claimed that he had been ordered back and got lost. This excuse was accepted.

During the following night (26 July 1916), Reynolds was ordered to accompany a ration party up to the front line. Again Reynolds fell out and went back to his battalion's transport lines. This time Reynolds was arrested and charged with desertion. He was found guilty by court-martial and sentenced to death.

At 05:27 on 23 August 1916, Reynolds was executed by firing squad. His remains are now located in Longuenesse Souvenir Cemetery, Plot IV, Row A, Grave 39.

==== Pte. John William Roberts ====
Born at Kings Cove Bonavista Bay Newfoundland on 5 August 1895, John William Roberts served in the Royal Navy Reserve for four years, before enlisting in the 2nd Canadian Mounted Rifles in May 1915. At some point during this time he was imprisoned for 28 days, as punishment for going AWOL while still in Canada.

Four months later his unit was deployed to France. In January 1916 he was sent to a medical camp, and upon being released the following month, once again disappeared. He wasn't found until June, when military police found him in civilian clothes.

His court-martial occurred in July, and Roberts was found guilty of desertion. He was executed by firing squad at 04:36 on 30 July 1916, and his body is now interred in Boulogne Eastern Cemetery, Plot VIII, Row A, Grave 154.

==== Pte. Charles Welsh ====
Born on 3 June 1887 in Chester, England, Charles Welsh was an immigrant to Canada. In February 1915, he enlisted in the 52nd Battalion, which departed to England that summer. By the end of the year, he had been transferred to reinforce the 8th Battalion, who were fighting in Belgium.

Date	Offence	Punishment
March 1916	Absent Without Leave (AWOL)	6 months hard labour; later commuted
August 1916	Absent Without Leave (AWOL)	2 years' imprisonment

Over the next two months, the 8th Battalion was involved in a number of bloody skirmishes surrounding Passchendaele, and at some point during this fighting - Welsh went missing for a third time. He was found 8 weeks later, living in a cottage near Poperinghe, charged, and sentenced once again to death by firing squad. He was executed at 06:00 on 6 March 1918, and buried in the Mazingarbe Communal Cemetery Extension, Plot III, Row B, Grave 12.

==== Pte. James Wilson ====
Born in Limerick, Ireland in June 1879, James H. Wilson spent nine years serving in the Connaught Rangers before emigrating to Canada before the war.

Wilson enlisted at the start of the war in August 1914, but was discharged the following February 3 after a series of infractions left him "undesirable for military service". He was re-instated a month later on 13 March, but had further infractions soon after.

Date	Offence	Punishment
March 1915	Absent Without Leave (AWOL)	Write-up
March 1915	Kicking a non-commissioned officer	Write-up
March 1915	Using abusive language	Fined $2
July 1915	Absent Without Leave (AWOL) and found drunk	70 days Field Punishment No. 1
August 1915	Disobeying a lawful command	90 days imprisonment, suspended

He went AWOL again on 25 February 1916, and was not seen again until he turned himself into the army nearly three months later. He was court-martialled and charged with desertion. He was sentenced to death, and at 04:20 on 9 July, was executed by firing squad. His remains are today located in Poperinghe New Military Cemetery, Plot II, Row H, Grave 2.

==== Pte. Elsworth Young ====
Born on 2 June 1895 in Halifax, Nova Scotia, Elsworth Young enlisted in the 25th Battalion during November 1914 at the age of 19. He was stationed in France in September 1915, serving as a batman.

On June 14, 1916, he was granted eight days leave.

On September 16, 1916, Private Young was reported from base missing. He was ordered to report back to his company's Sergeant-Major, in order to be transferred to replace troops lost during the Battle of Flers-Courcelette. He failed to report on time, though he arrived in time for the evening's rollcall.

On October 6, 1916, it was recorded that Private Young on October 4 was reported missing, now safe.

Several days later however, Young was arrested after being found miles behind the front lines, dressed in a Corporal's uniform. He initially gave a false name and rank to the Military Police who arrested him. He was charged with desertion, court-martialled and sentenced to death. He was executed by firing squad at 06:26 on 29 October 1916.

His remains are today located in Bully-Grenay Communal Cemetery, Plot II, Row B, Grave 14.

=== Executed for Cowardice ===
==== Pte. Dimitro Sinicky ====
Born in Kyiv, Kiev Governorate, Russian Empire (in modern Ukraine) in 1895, Dimitro Sinicky (#830020) emigrated to Canada. His name is natively spelled Dmytro Sinizki (Ukrainian: Дмитро́ Синицкий).

He voluntarily enlisted in Winnipeg's 144th Canadian Infantry during December 1915, and after shipping out to England, was one of a handful of troops used to reinforce the Ontarian 52nd Battalion after its losses at the Battle of Vimy Ridge. His Attestation Paper indicates his religious affiliation was "Greek Catholic," meaning he was a Ukrainian by ethnicity.

In August 1917, Sinicky was part of a trench-raiding team when he refused to participate in a raid. The following night he was forcibly brought along on the raid, but he simply sat down and refused to continue. He was arrested, court-martialled and charged with cowardice. Sentenced to death by firing squad, Sinicky was executed at 06:11 on 9 October 1917. He is buried in Plot VI K 19 of the Écoivres Military Cemetery, France.

=== Executed for Murder ===
==== Trooper Alexander Butler ====
Born in London, England on 11 June 1888, Alexander Butler served in the 7th Queen's Own Hussars for nearly seven years, before emigrating to Canada.

Following the outbreak of the war, Butler enlisted in the Royal Canadian Dragoons, and was dispatched to France in May 1915, where he participated in dismounted service at the Battle of Festubert, Battle of Givenchy and the Battle of Messines. Butler fell off his horse twice, once resulting in a head injury, which led to increasingly belligerent behaviour. The RCDs then saw mounted service in the forthcoming June 1916 Somme Offensive.

On 8 June 1916, while stationed behind the front lines of Hesdin, Butler took his rifle and opened fire, shooting Trooper Mickleburgh dead with five shots in the chest before he was overpowered and arrested.

He was court-martialled 16 days later, and while the courts made mention of his mental instability, several doctors testified that the claims were exaggerated and he was competent to stand trial. He was sentenced to death, and at 04:00 on 2 July 1916, was executed by firing squad. His remains are today located in Ribemont Communal Cemetery Extension, Plot IV, Row M, Grave 5.

==== Benjamin De Fehr ====
Born 29 March 1888 in Winkler, Manitoba, Benjamin De Fehr enlisted as a driver in the Canadian Army Service Corps following the outbreak of war, and was duly transferred to England in 1916.

He had no incidents of poor conduct, until 19 August 1916, while serving in France with the 1st Canadian Reserve Park in the rear areas near Hazebrouck. He used his rifle to shoot 43-year-old Regimental Sergeant-Major J.R. Scott in the back, killing him instantly. De Fehr was overpowered and arrested immediately.

He was officially court-martialled on 22 August, and while he maintained that he had been drunk during the incident, several witnesses testified that he had been sober. He was found guilty of murder and sentenced to death by firing squad.

De Fehr was executed three days later, and his remains are today located in Hazebrouck Communal Cemetery, Plot I, Row A, Grave 13, only three graves away from his victim, RSM Scott.
