= William Alexander (Canadian soldier) =

Canadian soldier

- Born: 18 September 1880; London, United Kingdom
- Died: 18 October 1917 (aged 37); Houdain, France
- Cause of death: Execution by firing squad
- Burial place: Barlin, France; 50°27′24.358″N 2°37′1.099″E
- Occupation: Soldier
- Years active: 1914-1917

William Alexander (18 September 1880 – 18 October 1917) was a Canadian soldier who served with the 10th Battalion, CEF in France during the First World War. His execution by firing squad following a charge of desertion sparked controversy in Canada. He was one of 25 Canadian soldiers executed during the course of the First World War.

== History ==
=== Early life ===
William Alexander was born in London, United Kingdom on 18 October 1880, but the early life of Alexander is very obscure. He served for 8 years in the King's Royal Rifle Corps before emigrating to Canada.
