= Jack Bray (footballer, born 2007) =

English footballer (born 2007)

Personal information
- Full name: Jack Owen Bray
- Date of birth: 23 February 2007 (age 19)
- Place of birth: Barnsley, England
- Position: Forward

Team information
- Current team: West Bromwich Albion

Youth career
- 2023–2024: Harrogate Town

Senior career*
Years	Team	Apps	(Gls)
2024–2025	Harrogate Town	1	(0)
2025–	West Bromwich Albion	0	(0)
- * Club domestic league appearances and goals as of 26 December 2024 (UTC)

Jack Owen Bray (born 23 February 2007) is an English professional footballer who plays as a forward for EFL Championship club West Bromwich Albion.

== Club career ==
=== Harrogate Town ===
Bray joined Harrogate Town at the age of 16. He made his professional debut for the club on 8 October 2024, in a 1–0 defeat to Crewe Alexandra in the EFL Trophy. He made his first league appearance on 26 December 2024, in a 2–1 defeat to Grimsby Town in League Two. On 7 May 2025, Harrogate said they had offered Bray a professional contract.

=== West Bromwich Albion ===
On 2 July 2025, Bray joined Championship side West Bromwich Albion on a three-year contract until 2028.

== Career statistics ==
As of 3 May 2025

Appearances and goals by club, season and competition
Club	Season	League			FA Cup		EFL Cup		Other		Total	
Club	Season	Division	Apps	Goals	Apps	Goals	Apps	Goals	Apps	Goals	Apps	Goals
Harrogate Town	2024–25	League Two	1	0	0	0	0	0	1 (Note: Appearances in EFL Trophy)	0	2	0
West Bromwich Albion	2025–26	Championship	0	0	0	0	0	0	—		0	0
West Bromwich Albion	2026–27	Championship	0	0	0	0	0	0	—		0	0
West Bromwich Albion	Total		0	0	0	0	0	0	0	0	0	0
Career total			1	0	0	0	0	0	1	0	2	0
