= William Alexander (rugby union, born 1905) =

English rugby union player

- Born: 6 October 1905 Newcastle-upon-Tyne, England

Rugby union career
- Position: Three-quarter
International career
Years	Team	Apps	(Points)
1927	England	1	(0)

William Alexander (born 6 October 1905) was an English international rugby union player.

A Newcastle native, Alexander played his rugby for hometown club Northern, initially as a centre or stand-off.

Alexander was experimented with on the wing in matches with Northumberland in 1926–27. He gained his solitary England cap as a left winger against France in Paris during the 1927 Five Nations and had a quiet game in a 0–3 loss.

== See also ==
- List of England national rugby union players
