= Willie Alexander (American football) =

American football player (born 1949)

No. 19
- Position: Cornerback

Personal information
- Born: September 21, 1949 (age 77); Montgomery, Louisiana, U.S.
- Listed height: 6 ft 2 in (1.88 m)
- Listed weight: 194 lb (88 kg)

Career information
- High school: George Washington Carver (Montgomery)
- College: Alcorn State
- NFL draft: 1971: 6th round, 134th overall pick

Career history
- Houston Oilers (1971–1979)

Career NFL statistics
- Interceptions: 23
- Fumble recoveries: 4
- Defensive TDs: 1
- Stats at Pro Football Reference

Willie Alexander (born September 21, 1949) is an American former professional football player who was a defensive back for the Houston Oilers of the National Football League (NFL) from 1971 to 1979. Before his professional career, Alexander played college football for the Alcorn State Braves.
