= West Bromwich Albion F.C. Under-21s and Academy =

West Bromwich Albion U23s & U18s
- Nickname: The Baggies
- Ground: The Hawthorns, Keys Park
- Owner: Shilen Patel
- Manager: Richard Stevens
- League: Premier League 2 Division 2
Home colours	Away colours	Third colours

West Bromwich Albion Reserves and Academy are the youth teams of West Bromwich Albion. The reserve team is made up of under-23 players, and is effectively West Bromwich Albion's second-string side. The under-18 players among other younger age groups make up the academy team. They play in the Premier League 2 Division 2, the second tier of reserve team football in England.

== Academy staff and hierarchy ==
Position	Name	
Academy Manager	(England)	Richard Stevens
Head of Academy Coaching	(England)	Mick Halsall
U-23s Manager	(England)	Leigh Downing
U-23s Coach	(Northern Ireland)	Chris Brunt
U-23s Coach	(Jamaica)	Deon Burton
U-18s Manager	(England)	Chay Thompson
Professional Phase Goalkeeping Development Coach	(Wales)	Boaz Myhill
Head of Academy Recruitment	(England)	Tom Brady

== History ==
In the 1882–83 season, Albion fielded a reserve side for the first time; the club's second team played 24 matches and went through the season undefeated. Due to the club's financial situation, the reserves had their wages halved early in the 1885–86 season, and by January 1886 the payments made to reserve players were withdrawn altogether. This resulted in Albion's second team refusing to play against Small Heath Alliance and the game was cancelled. Some of the players were suspended as a result of their actions, but were later re-instated. The Albion reserves first competed in The Central League in 1921 and won the competition seven times.

Albion's Youth team first entered the FA Youth Cup in 1952–53. In their first game in the competition, they defeated Brush Sports by a 10–1 scoreline. They reached the final in 1954–55 and 1968–69, losing to Manchester United and Sunderland respectively. Albion won the competition for the only time in their history in 1975–76, beating local rivals Wolverhampton Wanderers 5–0 on aggregate in the two-legged final. Albion came close to reaching the final of the competition during the 2018–19 season after an impressive cup run for the first time in 43 years, only to lose to Manchester City 4–2 in the semi-final under youth coach Mike Scott. Albion would have another successful cup run in 2020–21 season only to lose to Aston Villa in the semi-final 4–1. Albion won the U23s Premier League Cup for the first time in their history under Richard Beale during the 2021–22 season beating local rivals Wolverhampton Wanderers in a penalty shootout 5–4. Since April 2013, the club's academy has been based in the former Tom Silk Building in Halfords Lane, close to The Hawthorns.

== Academy squads ==
=== Under-23 squad ===
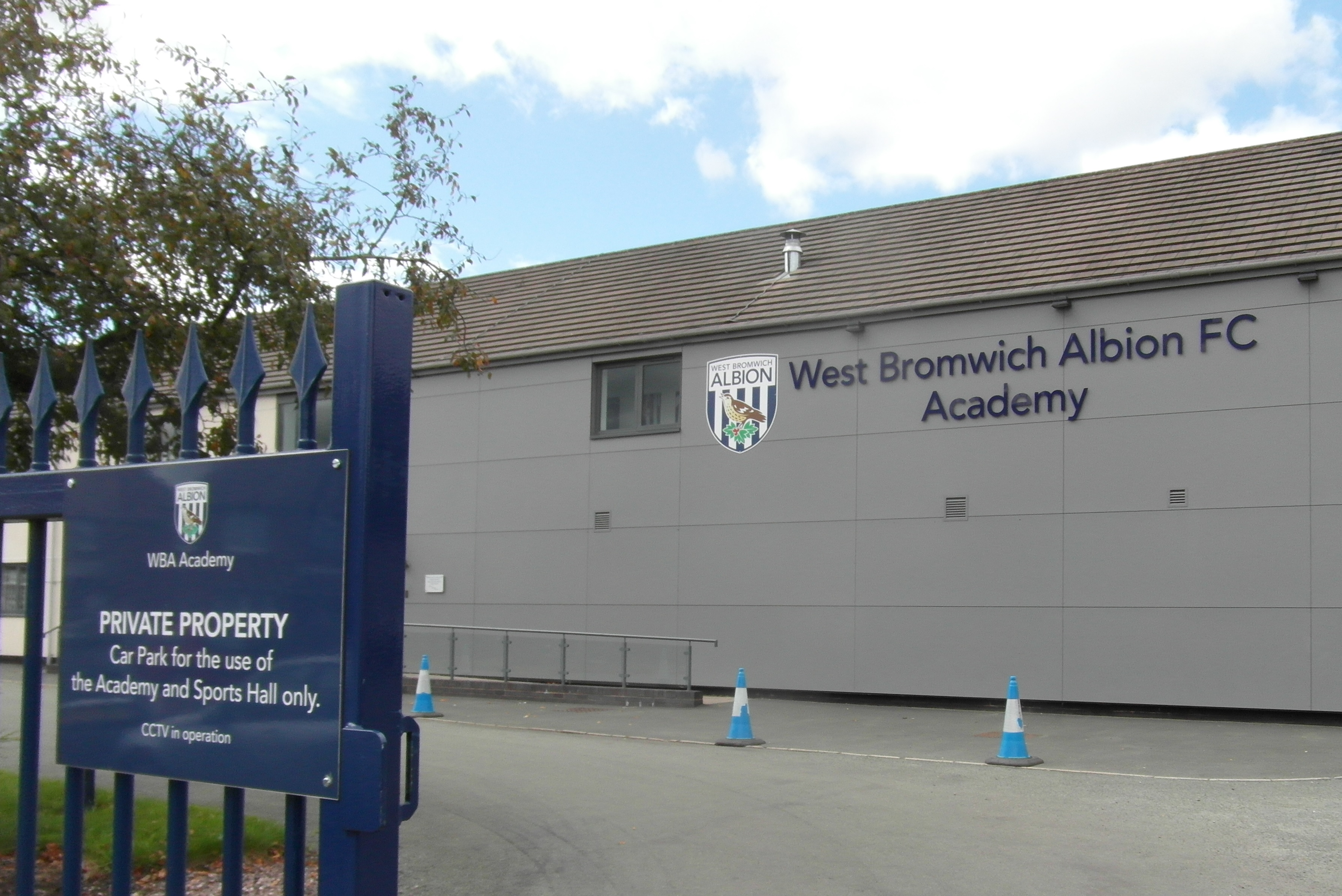
West Bromwich Albion F.C. Academy building

As of 13 September 2026

Note: Flags indicate national team as defined under FIFA eligibility rules; some limited exceptions apply. Players may hold more than one non-FIFA nationality.

No.	Pos.	Nation	Player
30	GK	NZL	Joe Wallis
31	DF	ENG	Alfie Maughan
32	FW	ENG	Rio Parmar
35	MF	ENG	Matthew Crowther
42	GK	ENG	Ben Cisse
—	GK	IRL	Louis Brady
—	GK	ENG	Brian Okonkwo
—	GK	ENG	Will Rutter
—	DF	ENG	Abdul Abudu
—	DF	NZL	Noah DuPont

No.	Pos.	Nation	Player
—	DF	ITA	Dauda Iddrisa
—	DF	ALG	Adam Letlat
—	DF	ENG	Jamal Mohammed
—	DF	ENG	Carter Pinnington
—	MF	ENG	Charlie Blackshields
—	MF	ENG	Ryan Colesby
—	MF	ENG	Kayden Lucas
—	FW	ENG	Jack Bray
—	FW	ENG	Nathan Dlamini
—	FW	ENG	Jaiden Francis-Caesar

=== Out on loan ===
Note: Flags indicate national team as defined under FIFA eligibility rules; some limited exceptions apply. Players may hold more than one non-FIFA nationality.

No.	Pos.	Nation	Player
37	FW	WAL	Ollie Bostock (on loan at Boston United until January)
—	MF	ENG	Cole Deeming (on loan at Hartlepool until January)

=== Under-18 squad ===
As of 3 July 2025

Note: Flags indicate national team as defined under FIFA eligibility rules; some limited exceptions apply. Players may hold more than one non-FIFA nationality.

No.	Pos.	Nation	Player
—	GK	WAL	Jack Lines
—	GK	ENG	Maxwell Moses
—	DF	ENG	Joel Asomugha
—	DF	ENG	Tyrell Hutchinson
—	DF	ENG	Theo Jackson
—	DF	ENG	Dylan Nasibu
—	DF	CYP	Antonio Perkins
—	DF	ENG	Alfie Round
—	DF	ENG	Reuben Saa
—	DF	ENG	Archie Saeed
—	DF	ENG	George Shaw
—	MF	ENG	Reece Bastafield

No.	Pos.	Nation	Player
—	MF	ENG	James Bythell
—	MF	ENG	Shane Gompe
—	MF	ENG	Danyal Iqbal
—	MF	ENG	Umar Sankoh
—	MF	ENG	Lewis Shead
—	FW	ENG	Frazer Billings
—	FW	ENG	Cole Dexter
—	FW	ENG	Harry French
—	FW	ENG	Remar McNeil
—	FW	GER	Justin Seven-Seven
—	FW	ENG	Ethan Smith
—	FW	ENG	Archie Williams
