= Association football in Northern Ireland =

- Country: Northern Ireland
- Governing body: Irish Football Association
- National team: Northern Ireland national football team

National competitions
- Irish Cup

Club competitions
- Northern Ireland Football League; Ballymena & Provincial League; Mid-Ulster Football League; Northern Amateur League; Northern Ireland Intermediate League

International competitions
- Champions League; Europa League; Super Cup; FIFA Club World Cup; FIFA World Cup (national team); UEFA European Championship (national team); UEFA Nations League (national team)

Association football in Northern Ireland, widely known as football or sometimes as soccer (to avoid confusion with Gaelic football), is one of the most popular sports in Northern Ireland. The governing body in Northern Ireland is the Irish Football Association (IFA) (not to be confused with the Football Association of Ireland (FAI) in the Republic of Ireland). Gaelic football, rugby union and association football are the most popular sports in Northern Ireland.

== Governing body ==
The Irish Football Association is the organising body for football in Northern Ireland, and was historically the governing body for the whole of Ireland until the FAI split away. The IFA has a permanent seat on the International Football Association Board, which is responsible for the laws of the game.

The Northern Ireland Women's Football Association (NIWFA) is the IFA's women's football arm. It runs a Women's Cup, Women's League and the Northern Ireland women's national football team.

== Competitions ==
The domestic league is the NIFL Premiership. Some of the major teams include Linfield, Larne, Crusaders, Cliftonville, Portadown and Glentoran. A notable historic club was Belfast Celtic, which won nineteen championships before resigning from the league in 1949 and disbanding after a sectarian riot at its Boxing Day match against Linfield. Derry City also left the league in 1972 following security issues arising from the Troubles, eventually to play in the FAI's League of Ireland. Linfield has won 56 league championships to date, more than twice as many titles as any other Northern Irish club and the highest tally of national top-flight titles won by any club worldwide. The SuperCupNI is a successful international youth tournament held annually in Northern Ireland, in which clubs and national teams from anywhere in the world may compete. Northern Ireland also played host to the 2005 UEFA Under-19 European Championships.

The Setanta Sports Cup was set up by its sponsors, television channel Setanta Ireland. It was an all-island tournament (two groups of four, then semis and final) featuring eight teams, four being from the League of Ireland and four from the Irish League. Despite fairly low turnouts for each jurisdiction's leagues, the Setanta Cup drew relatively successful gate receipts and in its existence had two winners from Northern Ireland (Linfield in 2005 and Crusaders in 2012).

== National team ==
The Northern Ireland national football team is one of the oldest international teams in the world, it was founded in 1880. It originally played as the Ireland national team until 1950 with players selected from both Northern Ireland and the Republic of Ireland, and competed in the British Home Championship which it won eight times. Northern Ireland joined FIFA in 1911, and UEFA in 1954.

The team enjoyed a period of success in the early and mid-80s in which it qualified for two World Cups, most notably in the 1982 tournament in which it topped Group 5 above Spain, Yugoslavia and Honduras to proceed to the second round. After a poor run of form in the late 1990s and first few years of the 21st century, and a corresponding slump in the FIFA World Rankings, there was a subsequent revival in the team's fortunes with home wins over Spain and England. The team came close to qualifying for the 2008 European Championships, and took part in the Nations Cup competition in 2011 along with Wales, Scotland and the Republic of Ireland. Northern Ireland qualified for UEFA Euro 2016, progressing through the group stage and reaching the round of 16. In 2018, the national team began their UEFA Nations League debut, in league B.

Men's team home matches draw significantly higher attendances than those of the NIFL Premiership. Attendances at Windsor Park home matches have consistently been in the 14,000-18,000 range in the time period between COVID-19 restrictions were lifted and November 2023.

== Problems ==
Abandoned Football Stand at a stadium in Belfast, Northern Ireland

Sectarian tensions have long been a cause of conflict at football matches in Northern Ireland, and crowd trouble marred games throughout the twentieth century. In 1949, Belfast Celtic withdrew from the Irish League after years of sectarian crowd problems culminated in a Boxing Day match against Linfield at Windsor Park which ended in a pitch invasion and riot in which Belfast Celtic's Protestant centre forward, Jimmy Jones, suffered a broken leg.

Since 1968, Cronin argues that the sport has failed to include the Catholic community with Catholic clubs being either forced out of existence or transferring their allegiance to the FAI. Hooliganism and sectarianism have remained problems throughout the Troubles and up to the present day. Northern Ireland football grounds have been described as "useful sites of public displays of political affiliation", and internal divisions between groups involved in political violence in the mid-1990s was reflected in the supporters of various clubs. Incidents of violence include trouble after Linfield player Conor Hagan was struck by a rocket fired from the crowd, and disturbances between Linfield and Glentoran fans at the 2008 Boxing Day match between the two clubs.

In addition to problems in domestic football, the Northern Ireland international team has also suffered from sectarian problems. In 2002 Celtic player Neil Lennon announced that he would no longer play for Northern Ireland because he received a death threat, and death threats appeared on the walls of loyalist areas including in his home town of Lurgan, County Armagh.

== Attendances ==
The average attendance per top-flight football league season and the club with the highest average attendance:

Season	League average	Best club	Best club average
2024-25	1,523	Linfield	2,775
2023-24	1,592	Linfield	3,212
2022-23	1,583	Glentoran	2,969

== Bibliography ==
- Roberts, Benjamin. Gunshots & Goalposts: The Story of Northern Irish Football.
- Marshall, Evan. Spirit of '58: The Incredible Untold Story of Northern Ireland's Greatest Football Team.
- Marshall, Evan. Fields of Wonder: The Incredible Story of Northern Ireland's Journey to the 1982 World Cup.

== See also ==
- Association football in the Republic of Ireland
- List of association football competitions
- Football in the United Kingdom
- Sport in Northern Ireland
- Sport in Ireland
- Gaelic football
