= Soccer in Ireland =

Soccer in Ireland may refer to:

- Association football in the Republic of Ireland
- Association football in Northern Ireland
