= 2026–27 West Bromwich Albion F.C. season =

English football club season

West Bromwich Albion
2026–27 season
- Owner: Bilkul Football WBA
- Chairman: Shilen Patel
- Head coach: James Morrison
- Stadium: The Hawthorns
- Championship: 5th
- FA Cup: Third Round
- EFL Cup: Second Round
- Top goalscorer: League: Isaac Price (7); All: Isaac Price (9)

The 2026–27 season is the 149th season in the history of West Bromwich Albion Football Club and their sixth consecutive season in the Championship. In addition to the domestic league, the club would also participate in the FA Cup, and the EFL Cup.

== Squad ==
As of 1 September 2026

No.	Name	Position	Nationality	Place of birth	Date of birth (age)	Signed from	Date signed	Fee	Contract end
Goalkeepers
1	Max O'Leary	GK	(Republic of Ireland)	(England) Bath	10 October 1996 (age 30)	Bristol City	22 January 2026	Free Transfer	30 June 2029
13	Matt Ingram	GK	(England)	High Wycombe	18 December 1993 (age 32)	Oxford United	1 July 2026	Free Transfer	30 June 2028
Defenders
2	Chris Mepham	CB	(Wales)	(England) Harrow	5 November 1997 (age 29)	Bournemouth	28 July 2025	Undisclosed	30 June 2028
3	Nat Phillips	CB	(England)	Bolton	23 March 1997 (age 29)	Liverpool	23 June 2025	Undisclosed	30 June 2028
4	Callum Styles	LB	(Hungary)	(England) Bury	27 March 2000 (age 26)	Barnsley	24 August 2024	Undisclosed	30 June 2030
6	George Campbell (c)	CB	(United States)	Chester	22 June 2001 (age 25)	(Canada) CF Montréal	18 July 2025	Undisclosed	30 June 2029
18	Brayann Pereira	RB	(France)	Saint-Quentin	21 May 2003 (age 23)	(Netherlands) NEC	1 September 2026	£1,000,000	30 June 2030
22	Conor Townsend	LB	(England)	Hessle	4 March 1993 (age 33)	Ipswich Town	24 July 2026	Free Transfer	30 June 2027
25	Nolan Galves	RB	(France)	Montbéliard	23 July 2003 (age 23)	(France) Rodez	28 July 2026	£850,000	30 June 2030
Midfielders
7	Felix Horn Myhre	CM	(Norway)	Oslo	4 March 1999 (age 27)	(Norway) Brann	5 August 2026	£2,500,000	30 June 2029
8	Jayson Molumby	CM	(Republic of Ireland)	Cappoquin	6 August 1999 (age 27)	Brighton & Hove Albion	1 July 2022	£1,000,000	30 June 2028
15	Toby Collyer	CDM	(England)	Worthing	3 January 2004 (age 22)	Manchester United	30 August 2026	£3,000,000	30 June 2030
17	Ousmane Diakité	CDM	(Mali)	Mali	25 July 2000 (age 26)	(Austria) TSV Hartberg	27 June 2024	Free Transfer	30 June 2029
20	Rabby Nzingoula	CM	(France)	Lille	25 November 2005 (age 20)	(France) Strasbourg	11 August 2026	Undisclosed	30 June 2029
21	Isaac Price	AM	(Northern Ireland)	(England) Pontefract	26 September 2003 (age 23)	(Belgium) Standard Liege	22 January 2025	Undisclosed	30 June 2029
29	Harry Whitwell	CM	(England)	Oxford	16 November 2005 (age 21)	Academy	17 November 2022	—N/a	30 June 2027
Forwards
9	Barney Stewart	ST	(Scotland)	(England) London	7 April 2004 (age 22)	(Scotland) Falkirk	17 June 2026	£1,300,000	30 June 2030
10	Mikey Johnston	LW	(Republic of Ireland)	(Scotland) Glasgow	19 April 1999 (age 27)	(Scotland) Celtic	30 August 2024	£3,000,000	30 June 2028
11	Jimmy-Jay Morgan	CF	(England)	Poole	21 January 2006 (age 20)	Chelsea	18 June 2026	£4,000,000	30 June 2030
19	Aune Heggebø	ST	(Norway)	Bergen	29 July 2001 (age 25)	(Norway) Brann	7 July 2025	£4,750,000	30 June 2030
23	Tammer Bany	CF	(Jordan)	(Denmark) Copenhagen	19 October 2003 (age 23)	(Denmark) Randers	3 February 2025	Undisclosed	30 June 2028
26	Kareem Tunde	RW	(Spain)	Barcelona	19 August 2005 (age 21)	(Spain) Levante	27 August 2026	Undisclosed	30 June 2030
Out on Loan
14	Alfie Gilchrist	RB	(England)	Kingston-upon-Thames	28 November 2003 (age 22)	Chelsea	29 August 2025	Undisclosed	30 June 2029
28	Alex Williams	RB	(Wales)	Wales	2 January 2005 (age 21)	Academy	13 January 2023	—N/a	30 June 2028
37	Ollie Bostock	LW	(Wales)	(England) Kingston-upon-Thames	20 February 2007 (age 19)	Academy	19 March 2024	—N/a	30 June 2027

== Statistics ==
=== Appearances and goals ===
As of 21 November 2026

Players with no appearances are not included on the list; italics indicate a loaned in player

No.	Pos	Nat	Player	Total		Championship		FA Cup		EFL Cup	
No.	Pos	Nat	Player	Apps	Goals	Apps	Goals	Apps	Goals	Apps	Goals
1	GK	(Republic of Ireland) IRL	Max O'Leary	17	0	16+0	0	0+0	0	1+0	0
2	DF	(Wales) WAL	Chris Mepham	13	0	10+2	0	0+0	0	1+0	0
3	DF	(England) ENG	Nat Phillips	14	0	9+4	0	0+0	0	1+0	0
4	DF	(Hungary) HUN	Callum Styles	18	3	16+0	3	0+0	0	1+1	0
6	DF	(United States) USA	George Campbell	16	0	13+1	0	0+0	0	2+0	0
7	MF	(Norway) NOR	Felix Horn Myhre	15	4	10+3	3	0+0	0	0+2	1
8	MF	(Republic of Ireland) IRL	Jayson Molumby	17	1	13+2	1	0+0	0	0+2	0
9	FW	(Scotland) SCO	Barney Stewart	14	1	3+9	1	0+0	0	1+1	0
10	FW	(Republic of Ireland) IRL	Mikey Johnston	1	0	0+0	0	0+0	0	0+1	0
11	FW	(England) ENG	Jimmy-Jay Morgan	18	7	13+3	5	0+0	0	2+0	2
13	GK	(England) ENG	Matt Ingram	1	0	0+0	0	0+0	0	1+0	0
15	MF	(England) ENG	Toby Collyer	4	0	4+0	0	0+0	0	0+0	0
17	MF	(Mali) MLI	Ousmane Diakité	17	0	12+3	0	0+0	0	2+0	0
18	DF	(Republic of the Congo) CGO	Brayann Pereira	8	0	8+0	0	0+0	0	0+0	0
19	FW	(Norway) NOR	Aune Heggebø	16	3	7+8	3	0+0	0	1+0	0
20	MF	(France) FRA	Rabby Nzingoula	17	1	9+7	1	0+0	0	1+0	0
21	MF	(Northern Ireland) NIR	Isaac Price	18	9	15+1	7	0+0	0	2+0	2
22	DF	(England) ENG	Conor Townsend	6	0	2+2	0	0+0	0	1+1	0
23	FW	(Jordan) JOR	Tammer Bany	4	0	0+3	0	0+0	0	0+1	0
25	DF	(France) FRA	Nolan Galves	7	0	5+1	0	0+0	0	1+0	0
26	FW	(Spain) ESP	Kareem Tunde	8	0	2+6	0	0+0	0	0+0	0
29	MF	(England) ENG	Harry Whitwell	14	2	8+4	1	0+0	0	2+0	1
35	MF	(England) ENG	Matthew Crowther	1	0	0+1	0	0+0	0	0+0	0
Players who featured but departed the club during the season:
5	DF	(Poland) POL	Krystian Bielik	1	0	0+1	0	0+0	0	0+0	0
27	MF	(England) ENG	Alex Mowatt	1	0	0+0	0	0+0	0	1+0	0
Players out on loan:
28	DF	(Wales) WAL	Alex Williams	1	0	0+0	0	0+0	0	1+0	0
37	FW	(Wales) WAL	Ollie Bostock	1	0	0+0	0	0+0	0	0+1	0

=== Disciplinary record ===
As of 21 Novemeber 2026

Rank	Number	Position	Nationality	Player	Championship			FA Cup			EFL Cup			Total		
Rank	Number	Position	Nationality	Player	Yellow card	(yellow card) (yellow-red card)	Red card	Yellow card	(yellow card) (yellow-red card)	Red card	Yellow card	(yellow card) (yellow-red card)	Red card	Yellow card	(yellow card) (yellow-red card)	Red card
1	17	CDM	(Mali)	Ousmane Diakité	4	0	0	0	0	0	1	0	0	5	0	0
1	20	CM	(France)	Rabby Nzingoula	4	0	0	0	0	0	1	0	0	5	0	0
3	18	RB	(France)	Brayann Pereira	2	1	0	0	0	0	0	0	0	2	1	0
4	3	CB	(England)	Nat Phillips	3	0	0	0	0	0	0	0	0	3	0	0
4	11	ST	(England)	Jimmy-Jay Morgan	3	0	0	0	0	0	0	0	0	3	0	0
4	29	CM	(England)	Harry Whitwell	3	0	0	0	0	0	0	0	0	3	0	0
7	2	CB	(England)	Chris Mepham	2	0	0	0	0	0	0	0	0	2	0	0
7	6	CB	(United States)	George Campbell	2	0	0	0	0	0	0	0	0	2	0	0
7	8	CM	(Republic of Ireland)	Jayson Molumby	2	0	0	0	0	0	0	0	0	2	0	0
7	9	ST	(Scotland)	Barney Stewart	1	0	0	0	0	0	1	0	0	2	0	0
7	21	CM	(Northern Ireland)	Isaac Price	2	0	0	0	0	0	0	0	0	2	0	0
12	4	LB	(England)	Callum Styles	1	0	0	0	0	0	0	0	0	1	0	0
Total					29	1	0	0	0	0	3	0	0	32	1	0

== Transfers and contracts ==
=== In ===
Date	Pos.	Player	From	Fee	Ref.
17 June 2026	CF	(Scotland) Barney Stewart	(Scotland) Falkirk	£1,300,000	
18 June 2026	CF	(England) Jimmy-Jay Morgan	(England) Chelsea	£4,000,000	
1 July 2026 (Note: The transfer was announced on 24 June, and would become official on July 1 once Ingram's contract at Oxford United expired.)	GK	(England) Matt Ingram	(England) Oxford United	Free	
1 July 2026 (Note: The transfer was announced on 18 June, and would become official on July 1 once Pinnington's contract at Liverpool expired.)	CB	(England) Carter Pinnington	(England) Liverpool	Free	
2 July 2026	GK	(England) William Rutter	(England) Brighton & Hove Albion	Free	
24 July 2026	LB	(England) Conor Townsend	(England) Ipswich Town	Free	
28 July 2026	RB	(France) Nolan Galves	(France) Rodez	£850,000	
5 August 2026	CM	(Norway) Felix Horn Myhre	(Norway) Brann	£2,500,000 (Note: A potential further £600,000 in add-ons)	
11 August 2026	CM	(France) Rabby Nzingoula	(France) Strasbourg	£2,000,000	
17 August 2026	LW	(England) Nathan Dlamini	(England) Blackburn Rovers	Free	
18 August 2026	CM	(England) Kayden Lucas	(England) Newcastle United	Free	
27 August 2026	RW	(Spain) Kareem Tunde	(Spain) Levante	£2,550,000 (Note: A potential further £1,700,000 in add-ons.)	
30 August 2026	CDM	(England) Toby Collyer	(England) Manchester United	£3,000,000 (Note: A potential further £4,600,000 in add-ons.)	
1 September 2026	RB	(France) Brayann Pereira	(Netherlands) NEC	£1,000,000	

=== Loaned in ===
Date	Pos.	Player	From	Date until	Ref.

=== Loaned out ===
Date	Pos.	Player	To	Loaned until	Ref.
11 August 2026	RB	(England) Alfie Gilchrist	(England) Leyton Orient	End of Season	
29 August 2026	GK	(Republic of Ireland) Louis Brady	(England) Malvern Town	26 September 2026	
3 September 2026	RB	(Wales) Alex Williams	(Scotland) Hibernian	End of Season	
4 September 2026	CM	(England) Cole Deeming	(England) Hartlepool United	2 January 2027	
10 September 2026	RW	(Wales) Ollie Bostock	(England) Boston United	2 January 2027	
16 September 2026	GK	(England) Brian Okonkwo	(England) Leamington	15 November 2026 (Note: 22 October, Okonkwo's initial one-month loan at Leamington was extended for a further month.)	
19 September 2026	CB	(England) Jamal Mohammed	(England) King's Lynn Town	17 October 2026	
29 September 2026	CB	(England) Carter Pinnington	(England) Solihull Moors	26 December 2026	
8 October 2026	CF	(England) Jaiden Francis-Caesar	(England) Alvechurch	5 November 2026	
24 October 2026	GK	(New Zealand) Joe Wallis	(England) Chester	31 October 2026	
31 October 2026	CB	(New Zealand) Noah DuPont	(England) Salisbury	31 November 2026	
10 November 2026	GK	(Republic of Ireland) Louis Brady	(England) Worcester Raiders	10 December 2026	
10 November 2026	CF	(England) Jaiden Francis-Caesar	(England) Rushall Olympic	10 December 2026	

=== Out ===
Date	Pos.	Player	To	Fee	Ref.
25 June 2026	GK	(England) Josh Griffiths	(England) Stoke City	Undisclosed	
14 July 2026	CF	(Nigeria) Eseosa Sule	(Scotland) St Mirren	Nominal fee	
6 August 2026	CAM	(Austria) Souleyman Mandey	(Austria) Grazer AK	Undisclosed	
14 August 2026	CM	(England) Alex Mowatt	(England) Derby County	£2,000,000	
26 August 2026	CB	(Poland) Krystian Bielik	(Wales) Cardiff City	£2,500,000	

=== Released/Out of contract ===
Date	Pos.	Player	Subsequent club	Joined date	Ref.
30 June 2026	LB	(England) Evan Humphries	(England) Oxford City	1 July 2026	
30 June 2026	CF	(England) Adam Okorodudu	(United States) San Diego State Aztecs	1 July 2026	
30 June 2026	LW	(England) Akeel Higgins	(England) Wigan Athletic	3 July 2026	
30 June 2026	RW	(England) Jed Wallace	(England) Bristol City	3 July 2026	
30 June 2026	CF	(United States) Daryl Dike	(United States) Orlando City	17 July 2026	
30 June 2026	CF	(England) Karlan Grant	(England) Charlton Athletic	19 July 2026	
30 June 2026	LW	(England) Torin Ntege	(England) Reading	31 July 2026	
30 June 2026	CF	(Nigeria) Josh Maja	(France) Le Havre	1 August 2026	
30 June 2026	RB	(England) Deago Nelson	(England) Oxford City	7 August 2026	
30 June 2026	CF	(England) Miller McDonald	(England) Tonbridge Angels	15 August 2026	
30 June 2026	CDM	(England) Kevin Mfuamba	(England) Reading	24 August 2026	
30 June 2026	GK	(England) Joe Wildsmith	(England) Wycombe Wanderers	24 September 2026	
30 June 2026	CF	(England) Dan Chimeziri	(England) Rushall Olympic	16th October 2026	
30 June 2026	CB	(Italy) Muhamed Diomande	(England) Worcester City	13th October 2026	
30 June 2026	CF	(England) Donte Ranger			
30 June 2026	GK	(England) Liam Wilkes			

=== New contract ===
Date	Pos.	Player	Contract expiry	Ref.
15 May 2026	GK	(Republic of Ireland) Louis Brady	30 June 2027	
15 May 2026	GK	(New Zealand) Joe Wallis	30 June 2027	
2 June 2026	GK	(Republic of Ireland) Max O'Leary	30 June 2029	
19 June 2026	LB	(Hungary) Callum Styles	30 June 2030	
24 June 2026	CDM	(Mali) Ousmane Diakité	30 June 2029	
1 July 2026 (Note: Contract agreement was announced on 19 May, and would become official on July 1.)	RW	(England) Remar McNeil	30 June 2028 (Note: First professional contract.)	
2 July 2026	GK	(England) Ben Cisse	30 June 2027 (Note: Option of a further year in the club's favour)	
2 July 2026	CB	(England) Jamal Mohammed	30 June 2027	
2 July 2026	GK	(England) Brian Okonkwo	30 June 2028	
9 July 2026	CF	(England) Jaiden Francis-Caesar	30 June 2027	
4 September 2026	CM	(England) Cole Deeming	30 June 2028	
18 September 2026	CM	(England) Harry Whitwell	30 June 2029	

== Pre-season and friendlies ==
On 1 June, West Brom announced a pre-season friendly against Peterborough United. A week later, a behind closed doors fixture against Sheffield Wednesday was confirmed. On 26 June, a visit to Shrewsbury Town was announced, as well as a training camp in Portugal with a fixture against Bromley. On 24 July, a behind-closed-doors friendly against Notts County was added.

Win Draw Loss Fixtures

11 July 2026 Friendly	Sheffield Wednesday	0–3	West Bromwich Albion	Burton upon Trent
12:00 BST		Report	Bielik; Morgan (pen.); Mowatt	Stadium: St. George's Park; Attendance: 0 (BCD)

17 July 2026 Friendly	West Bromwich Albion	4–1	Bromley	Ferreiras
19:00 CEST	Morgan 16'; Heggebø 45+3'; Bray 68'; Stewart 80'	Report	Adeboyejo 20' (pen.)	Stadium: Estádio da Nora; Attendance: 1,243

25 July 2026 Friendly	West Bromwich Albion	1–3	Notts County	Great Barr
12:00 BST	Stewart	Report	Evans; Browne; Acquah	Stadium: West Bromwich Albion Training Centre; Attendance: 0 (BCD)

25 July 2026 Friendly	Shrewsbury Town	1–4	West Bromwich Albion	Shrewsbury
15:00 BST	Fletcher 35'; Gbode (yellow card) 42'	Report	Whitwell 17'; Morgan 26', 45'; Price (yellow card) 42'; Heggebø 78'	Stadium: New Meadow; Attendance: 2,886

1 August 2026 Friendly	Peterborough United	0–2	West Bromwich Albion	Peterborough
15:00 BST		Report	Molumby (yellow card) 18'; Heggebø 48'; Stewart 72'	Stadium: London Road; Attendance: 2,444

4 August 2026 Friendly	West Bromwich Albion	1–1	Coventry City	West Bromwich
17:30 BST	Morgan 41'	Report	Tchaouna 26'	Stadium: The Hawthorns; Attendance: 0 (BCD)

== Competitions ==
=== Summary ===
==== August ====
Albion began the season with an EFL Cup first round tie away at Rotherham United. The Baggies came away convincing 1–4 winners, a brace from Jimmy-Jay Morgan and goals from Harry Whitwell and Felix Horn Myhre booking their place in the next round. The Championship season got under way the following weekend, and Albion produced another away victory, bringing all three points home from Carrow Road. Morrison's men had to defend resolutely throughout to deny the dangerous Norwich frontline, and were clinical when Aune Heggebø turned the ball in with his hand with 75 minutes on the clock. The Canaries fans and players furious with the decision, Albion soon wrapped up the points when Jimmy-Jay Morgan scored a brilliant solo goal and held on for the win despite Mathias Kvistgaarden's late consolation. The Baggies' first game of the season at The Hawthorns saw them face newly-relegated Burnley. A Callum Styles own goal gave the Clarets the lead before Harry Whitwell scored his first league goal to level the scoreline. Isaac Price scored twice in the second-half, first with a beautiful curling strike and then via a penalty to seal a 3–1 victory. Away at St. James' Park against top-flight Newcastle in the EFL Cup in midweek, Albion put in a valiant display, but bowed out with a 3–2 defeat. Isaac Price continued his fine form by putting the visitors ahead with a free-kick, but the Magpies turned it round through Bazoumana Touré and Harvey Barnes. Price drew Albion level from the spot after Lewis Hall handballed it in his own box, but soon after Barnes scored again to send Newcastle into the Third Round. The Baggies' first defeat of the season came the following weekend, away at Middlesbrough. After a strong first-half performance from the Albion, former West Brom loanee Will Lankshear opened the scoring just after half time, despite being "clearly offside", before Jimmy-Jay Morgan brought the visitors level, continuing his prolific start to the season. A strong performance from goalkeeper Max O'Leary was not enough to keep the Boro out, with a second goal from Lankshear soon after the equaliser, and a third from Alfie Jones sealing the result in Middlesbrough's favour.

==== September ====
September started with a midweek tie at home to Charlton Athletic. The Addicks were top of the table with three wins from three going into the game, and Albion struggled to break them down. Callum Styles opened the scoring for the hosts with a sumptuous volley in the second half, but Charlton were clinical and Tyreece Campbell equalised ten minutes later to secure a point. In the second game of the month, Albion hosted Watford who had only one win to their name so far this season. The stalemate was broken in the 39th minute after a quick break on the left hand side by winger Isaac Price, before passing the ball to Harry Whitwell, who assisted Jimmy-Jay Morgan, regaining his position as the team's seasonal top-scorer so far. On the 8 September, the club announced that winger Mikey Johnston would be subject to an extended period on the sidelines as a consequence of an ankle injury sustained in addition to the fracture he sustained versus Oxford United in February. Albion continued their good run of form in midweek with a 0–1 away win at Pride Park. Aune Heggebø gave the visitors the lead in the first-half, before debutant Brayann Pereira was sent off after receiving two yellow cards in quick succession. Despite having ten men for nearly an hour, the Baggies held on to secure all three points and go top of the table. They were back at home the following weekend to face Queens Park Rangers at lunchtime. The Throstles dominated the ball for the majority of the first-half, but fell behind after an unfortunate Chris Mepham own goal against the run of play. Callum Styles scored with a tidy finish soon after to level the score, but neither side were able to find a winner and it finished 1–1. The final game of September, before a two-week international break, was the first league Black Country derby since 2021, and the first in the Championship since 2008. Despite heroics from Max O'Leary in goal, West Brom fell to a 1–0 defeat in the away fixture at Molineux, in a game which was described by defender Conor Townsend as the stripes' "worst performance of the season".

==== October ====
Albion returned after the two week International break with another local derby against Birmingham City. Blues became the first away team to win at the Hawthorns in 2026–27 after a low-quality encounter, winning 0–1 after a August Priske first-half penalty. The Baggies did manage to bounce back in midweek, winning 1–2 away at Wrexham, coming back from 1–0 down with just 15 minutes to go. Kieffer Moore had put the hosts in front in the 64th minute, but substitutes Isaac Price and Aune Heggebø turned the game around to secure all three points. Tony Mowbray then returned to the Hawthorns, now in charge of Blackburn, and had a brilliant start with Andri Guðjohnsen firing Rovers into a 0–2 lead inside 12 minutes. Barney Stewart scored his first goal for the Baggies 7 minutes later to pull one back, leaving the game finely poised at 1–2 going into the break. Albion pushed hard for an equaliser in the second-half, and finally got one thanks to Isaac Price's dinked penalty, before Felix Horn Myhre came off the bench to complete the comeback and win the game right at the death. Next up for the Baggies was a trip to face bottom of the table Preston North End. In the howling Lancashire rain, both sides struggled to find an opening, but North End captain Andrew Hughes gave the hosts the lead from corner with just over 10 minutes to go. However, Albion hit back soon after, when Aune Heggebø's shot deflected in off Jimmy-Jay Morgan to secure an away point. Next up was a trip to West Ham United's London Stadium for the first time with fans since January 2018. The visitors started brightly and went ahead after Jimmy-Jay Morgan squared the ball to Felix Horn Myhre to tap into an empty net, before Hammers captain Jarrod Bowen equalised before half-time. Myhre and Morgan linked up again after the interval, as Morgan grabbed his 7th goal of the season to retake the lead, and Callum Styles scored late on to make it 1–3 and confirm a brilliant away victory on Halloween.

==== November ====
Albion were back at home in midweek, with another tough tie against in form Southampton. In an entertaining game, the hosts dominated the first half and led at the break through an Isaac Price penalty. The saints hit back in the second half when Samuel Edozie equalised, and despite both sides having chances to win it, the game finished as a pulsating 1–1 draw. The in form Baggies faced last year's beaten play-off semi finalists Millwall at the Hawthorns next, and extended their unbeaten run to six. Second half goals from Isaac Price, Jayson Molumby and Felix Horn Myhre were enough to secure a brilliant 3–0 triumph heading into the November international break. Albion faced managerless Swansea in South Wales after their return to action, and Isaac Price picked up exactly where he left off with a goal after 7 minutes. Moussa Yeo then levelled the game for the Swans, before Rabby Nzingoula grabbed his first goal in an Albion shirt to retake the lead for the away side. In a hectic few minutes before half-time, Price saw his panenka penalty saved by Lawrence Vigouroux before Elijah Just equalised soon after. The Baggies pushed for a winner in the second half, but were ultimately forced to settle for a point on the road.

=== Overall record ===
Competition	First match	Last match	Starting round	Record							
Competition	First match	Last match	Starting round	Pld	W	D	L	GF	GA	GD	Win %
Championship	15 August 2026	1 May 2027	Matchday 1	16	8	5	3	25	17	+8	50.00
FA Cup	January 2027		Third Round	0	0	0	0	0	0	+0	—
EFL Cup	8 August 2026	26 August 2026	First Round	2	1	0	1	6	4	+2	50.00
Total				18	9	5	4	31	21	+10	50.00

Last updated: 21 November 2026
Source: Soccerway

=== Championship ===
==== League table ====
Pos	Team	Pld	W	D	L	GF	GA	GD	Pts	Promotion, qualification or relegation
3	Wolverhampton Wanderers	16	9	4	3	28	19	+9	31	Qualification for Championship play-off semi-finals
4	Birmingham City	16	8	5	3	28	15	+13	29	Qualification for Championship play-off semi-finals
5	West Bromwich Albion	16	8	5	3	25	17	+8	29	Qualification for Championship play-off quarter-finals
6	Southampton	16	9	4	3	31	15	+16	27 (Note: Southampton were deducted four points due to multiple breaches of EFL regulations related to the unauthorised filming of other clubs' training.)	Qualification for Championship play-off quarter-finals
7	Queens Park Rangers	16	7	6	3	25	18	+7	27	Qualification for Championship play-off quarter-finals

Updated to match(es) played on 22 November 2026. Source: EFL Official Website
Rules for classification: 1) Points; 2) Goal difference; 3) Number of goals scored; 4) Head-to-head results; 5) Wins; 6) Away goals; 7) Penalty points (sec 9.5); 8) Number of 12-point sending off offences; 9) Play-off (only if needed to determine promotion/relegation)

==== Results summary ====
Overall								Home						Away					
Pld	W	D	L	GF	GA	GD	Pts	W	D	L	GF	GA	GD	W	D	L	GF	GA	GD
16	8	5	3	25	17	+8	29	4	3	1	13	7	+6	4	2	2	12	10	+2

Last updated: 21 November 2026.
Source: Soccerway

==== Results by round ====
Round	1	2	3	4	5	6	7	8	9	10	11	12	13	14	15	16	17	18	19	20	21	22	23	24	25	26	27	28	29	30	31	32	33	34	35	36	37	38	39	40	41	42	43	44	45	46
Ground	A	H	A	H	H	A	H	A	H	A	H	A	A	H	H	A	A	H	A	H	A	H	A	H	H	A	H	A	A	H	A	H	H	A	A	H	A	H	H	A	H	A	H	A	A	H
Result	W	W	L	D	W	W	D	L	L	W	W	D	W	D	W	D																														
Position	4	2	7	7	5	1	3	5	9	6	5	5	4	6	5	5																														
Points	3	6	6	7	10	13	14	14	14	17	20	21	24	25	28	29																														

Source: Soccerway
A = Away; H = Home; W = Win; D = Draw; L = Loss

==== Matches ====
Win Draw Loss Fixtures

15 August 2026 1	Norwich City	1–2	West Bromwich Albion	Norwich
15:00 BST	Kvistgaarden 90'	Report	Phillips (yellow card) 31'; Diakité (yellow card) 48'; Heggebø 75'; Morgan 87'	Stadium: Carrow Road; Attendance: 26,374 (2,022 away); Referee: Tim Robinson

23 August 2026 2	West Bromwich Albion	3–1	Burnley	West Bromwich
12:00 BST	Whitwell 18'; Campbell (yellow card) 33'; Price 46', 65' (pen.)	Report	Styles 8' (o.g.); Sonne (yellow card) 26'; Edwards (yellow card) 70'	Stadium: The Hawthorns; Attendance: 24,720 (1,844 away); Referee: Anthony Backhouse
Note: Live on Sky Sports

29 August 2026 3	Middlesbrough	3–1	West Bromwich Albion	Middlesbrough
12:30 BST	Lankshear 48', 73'; Jones 87'	Report	Diakité (yellow card) 61'; Morgan 65'	Stadium: The Riverside; Attendance: 29,571 (1,628 away); Referee: Paul Tierney
Note: Live on Sky Sports

2 September 2026 4	West Bromwich Albion	1–1	Charlton Athletic	West Bromwich
19:45 BST	Styles 59'; Price (yellow card) 90+3'	Report	Campbell 69'; Bindon (yellow card) 77'	Stadium: The Hawthorns; Attendance: 22,578 (923 away); Referee: Farai Hallam

5 September 2026 5	West Bromwich Albion	1–0	Watford	West Bromwich
15:00 BST	Morgan (yellow card) 34', (goal) 36'; Diakité (yellow card) 42'; Phillips (yellow card) 88'; Whitwell (yellow card) 89'; Price (yellow card) 90+5'	Report	Payero (yellow card) 16'; Kayembe (yellow card) 63'; Bravo (yellow card) 90+5'	Stadium: The Hawthorns; Attendance: 24,800 (1,854 away); Referee: Michael Salisbury

9 September 2026 6	Derby County	0–1	West Bromwich Albion	Derby
19:45 BST		Report	Whitwell (yellow card) 10'; Heggebø 16'; Pereira (yellow card) 26' (yellow-red card) 34'; Morgan (yellow card) 82'	Stadium: Pride Park Stadium; Attendance: 27,323 (3,100 away); Referee: James Bell

12 September 2026 7	West Bromwich Albion	1–1	Queens Park Rangers	West Bromwich
12:30 BST	Styles 41'; Diakité (yellow card) 90+3'	Report	Mepham 38' (o.g.); Kamara (yellow card) 51'; Clarke-Salter (yellow card) 63'; Varane (yellow card) 64'; Burrell (yellow card) 80'	Stadium: The Hawthorns; Attendance: 24,547 (1,453 away); Referee: Ruebyn Ricardo
Note: Live on Sky Sports+

20 September 2026 8	Wolverhampton Wanderers	1–0	West Bromwich Albion	Wolverhampton
12:00 BST	López 50'; Munetsi (yellow card) 69'	Report	Molumby (yellow card) 25'; Phillips (yellow card) 44'	Stadium: Molineux Stadium; Attendance: 30,892 (2,550 away); Referee: Josh Smith
Note: Live on Sky Sports

10 October 2026 9	West Bromwich Albion	0–1	Birmingham City	West Bromwich
12:30 BST	Nzingoula (yellow card) 8'; Morgan (yellow card) 89'	Report	Cochrane (yellow card) 31'; Priske 41' (pen.); Vicente (yellow card) 75'; Stansfield (yellow card) 89'; Osayi-Samuel (yellow card) 89'	Stadium: The Hawthorns; Attendance: 25,933 (2,542 away); Referee: Gavin Ward
Note: Live on Sky Sports

13 October 2026 10	Wrexham	1–2	West Bromwich Albion	Wrexham
19:45 BST	Moore 64'; Vyner (yellow card) 83'	Report	Nzingoula (yellow card) 39'; Stewart (yellow card) 65'; Price 79'; Heggebø 84'	Stadium: The Racecourse Ground; Attendance: 10,500 (1,293 away); Referee: Thomas Kirk

17 October 2026 11	West Bromwich Albion	3–2	Blackburn Rovers	West Bromwich
15:00 BST	Stewart 19'; Campbell (yellow card) 23'; Mepham (yellow card) 41'; Price 72' (pen.); Myhre 89'	Report	Guðjohnsen 6', 12'; Montgomery (yellow card) 21'; Afolayan (yellow card) 32'; McLoughlin (yellow card) 71'	Stadium: The Hawthorns; Attendance: 24,794 (1,883 away); Referee: Adam Herczeg

24 October 2026 12	Preston North End	1–1	West Bromwich Albion	Preston
15:00 BST	Moran (yellow card) 64'; Hughes 78'	Report	Whitwell (yellow card) 33'; Morgan 82'	Stadium: Deepdale; Attendance: 17,430 (4,216 away); Referee: Elliot Bell

31 October 2026 13	West Ham United	1–3	West Bromwich Albion	Stratford
15:00 GMT	Kilman (yellow card) 17'; Bowen 29'; Walker-Peters (yellow card) 66'; Engels (yellow card) 85'	Report	Myhre 20'; Morgan 48'; Styles 72'; Molumby (yellow card) 89'	Stadium: London Stadium; Attendance: 61,125 (3,001 away); Referee: Robert Jones

3 November 2026 14	West Bromwich Albion	1–1	Southampton	West Bromwich
20:00 GMT	Price 22' (pen.); Styles (yellow card) 61'; Nzingoula (yellow card) 66'	Report	Edozie 53'; Downes (yellow card) 77'	Stadium: The Hawthorns; Attendance: 23,971 (2,469 away); Referee: Josh Smith
Note: Live on Sky Sports

7 November 2026 15	West Bromwich Albion	3–0	Millwall	West Bromwich
15:00 GMT	Price 50'; Pereira (yellow card) 52'; Molumby 78'; Myhre 89'	Report	Mazou-Sacko (yellow card) 43'; Sturge (yellow card) 64'	Stadium: The Hawthorns; Attendance: 24,402 (2,017 away); Referee: Thomas Bramall

21 November 2026 16	Swansea City	2–2	West Bromwich Albion	Swansea
15:00 GMT	Yeo 16'; Tymon (yellow card) 45'; Just 45+4'; Cabango (yellow card) 56'; Opoku (yellow card) 63'; Eustáquio (yellow card) 69'; Lissah (yellow card) 73'	Report	Price 7', (penalty missed) 45+2'; Nzingoula 38', (yellow card) 67'; Pereira (yellow card) 47'; Mepham (yellow card) 61'	Stadium: Swansea.com Stadium; Attendance: 18,092 (1,971 away); Referee: Thomas Kirk

25 November 2026 17	Bolton Wanderers	v	West Bromwich Albion	Horwich
19:45 GMT				Stadium: Toughsheet Community Stadium

28 November 2026 18	West Bromwich Albion	v	Bristol City	West Bromwich
15:00 GMT				Stadium: The Hawthorns

5 December 2026 19	Portsmouth	v	West Bromwich Albion	Portsmouth
15:00 GMT				Stadium: Fratton Park

8 December 2026 20	West Bromwich Albion	v	Cardiff City	West Bromwich
19:45 GMT				Stadium: The Hawthorns

12 December 2026 21	Stoke City	v	West Bromwich Albion	Stoke-on-Trent
12:30 GMT				Stadium: bet365 Stadium
Note: Live on Sky Sports

18 December 2026 22	West Bromwich Albion	v	Sheffield United	West Bromwich
20:00 GMT				Stadium: The Hawthorns
Note: Live on Sky Sports

26 December 2026 23	Lincoln City	v	West Bromwich Albion	Lincoln
15:00 GMT				Stadium: Sincil Bank

29 December 2026 24	West Bromwich Albion	v	Preston North End	West Bromwich
19:45 GMT				Stadium: The Hawthorns

1 January 2027 25	West Bromwich Albion	v	Stoke City	West Bromwich
15:00 GMT				Stadium: The Hawthorns

16 January 2027 26	Blackburn Rovers	v	West Bromwich Albion	Blackburn
15:00 GMT				Stadium: Ewood Park

23 January 2027 27	West Bromwich Albion	v	West Ham United	West Bromwich
15:00 GMT				Stadium: The Hawthorns
Note: Fixture was initially scheduled for a 15:00 kick-off, but was brought forward for live Sky Sports broadcasting.

26 January 2027 28	Southampton	v	West Bromwich Albion	Southampton
19:45 GMT				Stadium: St. Mary's Stadium

30 January 2027 29	Millwall	v	West Bromwich Albion	Bermondsey
15:00 GMT				Stadium: The Den

6 February 2027 30	West Bromwich Albion	v	Swansea City	West Bromwich
15:00 GMT				Stadium: The Hawthorns

13 February 2027 31	Queens Park Rangers	v	West Bromwich Albion	Shepherd's Bush
15:00 GMT				Stadium: Loftus Road

16 February 2027 32	West Bromwich Albion	v	Wrexham	West Bromwich
19:45 GMT				Stadium: The Hawthorns

20 February 2027 33	West Bromwich Albion	v	Wolverhampton Wanderers	West Bromwich
12:30 GMT				Stadium: The Hawthorns
Note: Fixture was initially scheduled for a 15:00 kick-off, but was brought forward for live Sky Sports broadcasting.

26 February 2027 34	Birmingham City	v	West Bromwich Albion	Birmingham
20:00 GMT				Stadium: St Andrew's
Note: Fixture was initially scheduled for 27 February, but was brought forward to the night prior for live Sky Sports broadcasting.

2 March 2027 35	Burnley	v	West Bromwich Albion	Burnley
19:45 GMT				Stadium: Turf Moor

6 March 2027 36	West Bromwich Albion	v	Norwich City	West Bromwich
15:00 GMT				Stadium: The Hawthorns

13 March 2027 37	Bristol City	v	West Bromwich Albion	Bristol
15:00 GMT				Stadium: Ashton Gate

16 March 2027 38	West Bromwich Albion	v	Portsmouth	West Bromwich
19:45 GMT				Stadium: The Hawthorns

20 March 2027 39	West Bromwich Albion	v	Lincoln City	West Bromwich
15:00 GMT				Stadium: The Hawthorns

13 April 2027 40	Sheffield United	v	West Bromwich Albion	Sheffield
15:00 BST				Stadium: Bramall Lane

7 April 2027 41	West Bromwich Albion	v	Derby County	West Bromwich
19:45 BST				Stadium: The Hawthorns

10 April 2027 42	Watford	v	West Bromwich Albion	Watford
15:00 BST				Stadium: Vicarage Road

17 April 2027 43	West Bromwich Albion	v	Middlesbrough	West Bromwich
15:00 BST				Stadium: The Hawthorns

20 April 2027 44	Charlton Athletic	v	West Bromwich Albion	Charlton
19:45 BST				Stadium: The Valley

24 April 2027 45	Cardiff City	v	West Bromwich Albion	Cardiff
15:00 BST				Stadium: Cardiff City Stadium

1 May 2027 46	West Bromwich Albion	v	Bolton Wanderers	West Bromwich
12:30 BST				Stadium: The Hawthorns

=== FA Cup ===
Win Draw Loss Fixtures

=== EFL Cup ===
West Brom were drawn away to Rotherham United in the first round and to Newcastle United in the second round.

Win Draw Loss Fixtures

8 August 2025 First Round	Rotherham United	1–4	West Bromwich Albion	Rotherham
17:30 BST	Cover (yellow card) 78'; Tavares 87', (yellow card) 90+2'	Report	Morgan 8', 61'; Whitwell 24'; Myhre 55'	Stadium: New York Stadium; Attendance: 4,850 (2,973 away); Referee: Tom Reeves
Note: Live on Sky Sports+

26 August 2025 Second Round	Newcastle United	3–2	West Bromwich Albion	Newcastle upon Tyne
19:45 BST	Steur (yellow card) 18'; Touré 38'; Barnes 48', 81'; Jaouen (yellow card) 77'; Ramsey (yellow card) 89'	Report	Price 17', 77' (pen.); Nzingoula (yellow card) 52'; Diakité (yellow card) 55'; Stewart (yellow card) 62'	Stadium: St James' Park; Attendance: 51,405; Referee: Bobby Madley
Note: Live on Sky Sports+
