= Brayann Pereira =

French footballer (born 2003)

Personal information
- Full name: Brayann Leancely Christva Pereira
- Date of birth: 21 May 2003 (age 23)
- Place of birth: Saint-Quentin, France
- Height: 1.72 m (5 ft 8 in)
- Position: Right-back

Team information
- Current team: West Bromwich Albion
- Number: 18

Youth career
- 2012–2017: Saint-Quentin
- 2017–2021: Lens

Senior career*
Years	Team	Apps	(Gls)
2020–2022	Lens II	20	(0)
2021–2022	Lens	2	(0)
2022–2024	Auxerre II	2	(0)
2022–2024	Auxerre	2	(0)
2023	→ Bourg-Péronnas (loan)	7	(0)
2023–2024	→ NEC (loan)	15	(0)
2024–2026	NEC	58	(3)
2026–	West Bromwich Albion	3	(0)

International career^{‡}
2018–2019	France U16	8	(0)
2019–2020	France U17	6	(0)
2021–2022	France U19	15	(0)
2022–2023	France U20	8	(0)
- * Club domestic league appearances and goals as of 12:33, 15 October 2026 (UTC) ‡ National team caps and goals as of 28 May 2023

Brayann Leancely Christva Pereira (born 21 May 2003) is a French professional footballer who plays as a right-back for EFL Championship club West Bromwich Albion.

== Club career ==
Pereira made his professional debut for RC Lens on 22 January 2022, replacing Gaël Kakuta in the 83rd minute of a 2–0 home Ligue 1 loss against Olympique de Marseille.

On 12 July 2022, Pereira signed a three-year contract with Auxerre. On 2 February 2023, Pereira was loaned to Bourg-Péronnas in the Championnat National.

=== NEC Nijmegen ===
On 4 August 2023, Pereira moved on a new loan to NEC Nijmegen in the Netherlands, with an option to buy. On 21 March 2024, NEC exercised their purchase option and Pereira signed a three-year contract with the Dutch club.

=== West Bromwich Albion ===
On 1 September 2026, Pereira signed with EFL Championship club West Bromwich Albion on a four-year contract, for a reported £1,000,000. He made his debut in an away fixture against Derby County, but was sent off after just 34 minutes after receiving two yellow cards inside ten minutes.

== International career ==
Pereira was born in France, and is of Angolan and Congolese descent. He was capped at several youth levels for France between 2018 and 2023.

In September 2026, Pereira was called up to the Congolese national team for the first time for their African Cup of Nations qualification campaign. However, Pereira turned down the opportunity to instead remain in training with West Bromwich Albion during the international break, with whom he had recently signed.

== Career statistics ==
=== Club ===
As of match played 13 October 2026

Appearances and goals by club, season and competition
Club	Season	League			National cup (Note: Includes Coupe de France, KNVB Cup, FA Cup)		League cup (Note: Includes EFL Cup)		Europe		Other		Total	
Club	Season	Division	Apps	Goals	Apps	Goals	Apps	Goals	Apps	Goals	Apps	Goals	Apps	Goals
Lens II	2020–21	CFA 1	6	0	—		—		—		—		6	0
Lens II	2021–22	CFA 1	14	0	—		—		—		—		14	0
Lens II	Total		20	0	—		—		—		—		20	0
Lens	2021–22	Ligue 1	2	0	0	0	—		—		—		2	0
Auxerre	2022–23	Ligue 1	2	0	0	0	—		—		—		2	0
Auxerre II	2022–23	CFA 1	2	0	—		—		—		—		2	0
Bourg-Péronnas (loan)	2022–23	Ligue 3	7	0	—		—		—		—		7	0
NEC (loan)	2023–24	Eredivisie	15	0	1	0	—		—		1 (Note: Appearances in European play-offs)	0	17	0
NEC	2024–25	Eredivisie	31	3	2	0	—		—		1	0	34	3
NEC	2025–26	Eredivisie	24	0	3	0	—		—		—		27	0
NEC	2026–27	Eredivisie	3	0	0	0	—		4 (Note: Four appearances in UEFA Champions League)	0	—		6	0
NEC	Total		58	3	5	0	—		4	0	1	0	67	3
West Bromwich Albion	2026–27	EFL Championship	3	0	0	0	0	0	—		—		3	0
Career Total			109	3	6	0	0	0	4	0	2	0	121	3

== Honours ==
Individual

- UEFA European Under-19 Championship Team of the Tournament: 2022
- Eredivisie Team of the Month: November 2024, May 2025
