= Harry Whitwell =

English footballer

Personal information
- Full name: Harry John Daniel Whitwell
- Date of birth: 16 November 2005 (age 21)
- Place of birth: Oxford, England
- Height: 5 ft 11 in (1.80 m)
- Position: Midfielder

Team information
- Current team: West Bromwich Albion
- Number: 29

Youth career
- 2017–2024: West Bromwich Albion

Senior career*
Years	Team	Apps	(Gls)
2024–	West Bromwich Albion	15	(1)
2025–2026	→ Forest Green Rovers (loan)	23	(2)

International career^{‡}
2021	England U16	1	(0)
2021	England U17	3	(0)
2022–2023	England U18	4	(0)
- * Club domestic league appearances and goals as of 21 November 2026 ‡ National team caps and goals as of 11 June 2023

Harry John Daniel Whitwell (born 16 November 2005) is an English professional footballer who plays as a midfielder for EFL Championship club West Bromwich Albion.

== Club career ==
=== West Bromwich Albion ===
Born in Oxford, Whitwell signed his first professional contract with West Bromwich Albion on 17 November 2022. He made his professional debut for the club on 7 January 2024 in the FA Cup, in a 4–1 win against Aldershot Town. On 13 August 2024, he made his first start for the club in a 2–1 defeat to Fleetwood Town in the EFL Cup.

On 21 August 2024, Whitwell signed a new contract extension running until 2026. He made his first league appearance on 3 May 2025, in a 5–3 win against Luton Town in the Championship. On 8 August 2025, he signed another contract extension with the club.

On 15 August 2025, Whitwell joined National League side Forest Green Rovers on a season-long loan. On 20 August 2025, he scored on his debut for the club in a 4–0 win against Sutton United. On 7 January 2026, he was recalled by his parent club.

Whitwell scored his first goal for West Bromwich Albion on 8 August 2026, netting in a 4–1 win against Rotherham United in the EFL Cup. He scored his first league goal for the club on 23 August 2026, in a 3–1 win against Burnley. On 18 September 2026, he signed a new contract with the club until 2029.

== International career ==
Whitwell has represented the England under-18 football team.

== Career statistics ==
As of match played 21 November 2026

Appearances and goals by club, season and competition
Club	Season	League			FA Cup		League Cup		Other		Total	
Club	Season	Division	Apps	Goals	Apps	Goals	Apps	Goals	Apps	Goals	Apps	Goals
West Bromwich Albion	2023–24	Championship	0	0	1	0	0	0	0	0	1	0
West Bromwich Albion	2024–25	Championship	1	0	0	0	1	0	—		2	0
West Bromwich Albion	2025–26	Championship	2	0	2	0	0	0	—		4	0
West Bromwich Albion	2026–27	Championship	12	1	0	0	2	1	—		14	2
West Bromwich Albion	Total		15	1	3	0	3	1	0	0	21	2
Forest Green Rovers (loan)	2025–26	National League	23	2	2	1	—		1 (Note: Appearances in FA Trophy)	0	26	3
Career total			38	3	5	1	3	1	1	0	47	5
