= Jimmy-Jay Morgan =

English footballer

Personal information
- Full name: Jimmy-Jay Morgan
- Date of birth: 21 January 2006 (age 20)
- Place of birth: Poole, England
- Height: 1.80 m (5 ft 11 in)
- Positions: Attacking midfielder; forward

Team information
- Current team: West Bromwich Albion
- Number: 11

Youth career
- 2014–2017: Chelsea
- 2017–2023: Southampton
- 2023–2024: Chelsea

Senior career*
Years	Team	Apps	(Gls)
2024–2026	Chelsea	0	(0)
2025	→ Gillingham (loan)	16	(2)
2025–2026	→ Peterborough United (loan)	34	(12)
2026–	West Bromwich Albion	15	(5)

International career^{‡}
2021–2022	England U16	8	(3)
2022	England U17	8	(6)
2023	England U18	5	(0)
2025–	England U20	3	(0)
- * Club domestic league appearances and goals as of 18:07, 17 November 2026 (UTC) ‡ National team caps and goals as of 18:07, 17 November 2026 (UTC)

Jimmy-Jay Morgan (born 21 January 2006) is an English professional footballer who plays as an attacking midfielder or forward for EFL Championship club West Bromwich Albion.

== Early life ==
Morgan joined the academy of Chelsea at the age of eight, before leaving for Southampton three years later due to issues with the commute to the Cobham Training Centre. He was a prolific goal-scorer for Southampton at junior level with 27 goals for Southampton's Under-16s and 13 more for the Under-18s during the 2021–22 season. Southampton academy coach Louis Carey said Morgan is "one of the best" finishers he had seen in the club's youth programme.

== Club career ==
=== Southampton ===
Aged 16, Morgan played for Southampton U21s in three Football League Trophy group stage defeats in August and October 2022. He was named in the first team squad as a substitute for an EFL Cup match against Sheffield Wednesday in November 2022. He was in the first team match day squad again for Southampton on 7 January 2023 for the FA Cup tie away to Crystal Palace which Southampton won 2–1. In January 2023 reports emerged that Morgan had rejected the offer of a first professional contract at Southampton.

=== Chelsea ===
On 10 February 2023, Morgan joined Chelsea for an undisclosed fee.

On 24 January 2025, Morgan joined League Two club Gillingham on loan for the remainder of the season. He made his debut for the club on 25 January 2025, in a 1–1 draw with Tranmere Rovers. He scored his first goal for the club on 4 March 2025, in a 3–1 defeat to Newport County.

On 1 September 2025, Morgan joined League One club Peterborough United on loan until the end of the season. He made his debut for the club the next day, in a 3–1 defeat to Leyton Orient in the EFL Trophy. He scored his first goal for the club on 6 September 2025, in a 3–2 defeat to Huddersfield Town.

=== West Bromwich Albion ===
On 18 June 2026, Morgan joined Championship club West Bromwich Albion on a four-year contract for an undisclosed fee. Morgan scored his first competitive goals for the club on 8 August 2026, scoring twice in a 4–1 EFL Cup game away at Rotherham United. On 15 August 2026, Morgan scored on his league debut with the club, in a 2-1 win against Norwich City. Having scored two goals and assisted a further two in his first three league matches, he was named EFL Young Player of the Month for August 2026.

== International career ==
Morgan scored for the England U17 team in consecutive matches in October 2022, against Georgia and Israel in qualifying matches for the European U17 Championship, and had a tally of six goals is his first seven matches at that level.

On 6 September 2023, Morgan made his England under-18 debut during a 2–0 defeat to France in Limoges.

On 10 October 2025, Morgan made his England U20 debut during a 1–0 defeat to Switzerland at St. George's Park.

== Career statistics ==
As of match played 13 October 2026

Appearances and goals by club, season and competition
Club	Season	League			FA Cup		EFL Cup		Other		Total	
Club	Season	Division	Apps	Goals	Apps	Goals	Apps	Goals	Apps	Goals	Apps	Goals
Southampton U21	2022–23	—			—		—		3 (Note: Appearance(s) in EFL Trophy)	0	3	0
Southampton	2022–23	Premier League	0	0	0	0	0	0	—		0	0
Chelsea U21	2023–24	—			—		—		3	1	3	1
Chelsea U21	2024–25	—			—		—		3	0	3	0
Chelsea U21	2025–26	—			—		—		0	0	0	0
Chelsea U21	Total		—		—		—		6	1	6	1
Gillingham (loan)	2024–25	League Two	16	2	—		—		—		16	2
Peterborough United (loan)	2025–26	League One	34	12	2	0	0	0	3	2	39	14
West Bromwich Albion	2026–27	Championship	15	5	0	0	2	2	—		7	5
Career total			65	19	2	0	2	2	12	3	81	24

== Honours ==
Individual

- EFL Young Player of the Month: August 2026
