= 2023–24 FC Sochaux-Montbéliard season =

French club football season

FC Sochaux-Montbéliard
2023–24 season
- Manager: Oswald Tanchot
- Stadium: Stade Auguste-Bonal
- Championnat National: 4th
- Coupe de France: Round of 16
- Biggest defeat: Sochaux 1–6 Rennes

2023–24 FC Sochaux-Montbéliard season is the club's 96th season in history and its first season in the third tier of French football, the Championnat National, having been subjected to administrative relegation from the Ligue 2. They will also take part in the Coupe de France, entering from the seventh round. The club played its first game on 25 August. This is manager's Oswald Tanchot first season with the club after having been appointed on 1 July 2023.

== Players ==
As of 26 January 2024

Note: Flags indicate national team as defined under FIFA eligibility rules; some limited exceptions apply. Players may hold more than one non-FIFA nationality.

| No. | Pos. | Nation | Player |
|---|---|---|---|
| 1 | GK | FRA | Mathieu Patouillet |
| 2 | DF | FRA | Nolan Galves |
| 3 | DF | FRA | Amilcar Silva |
| 4 | DF | FRA | Arthur Vitelli |
| 5 | DF | MTQ | Boris Moltenis |
| 6 | MF | FRA | Mouhamadou Drammeh |
| 7 | MF | FRA | Tony Mauricio |
| 8 | MF | FRA | Kévin Hoggas |
| 9 | FW | CIV | N'Dri Philippe Koffi |
| 10 | MF | FRA | Roli Pereira de Sa |
| 11 | FW | CIV | Issouf Macalou |
| 14 | DF | SUI | Sidy Diagne |
| 15 | DF | MAD | Thomas Fontaine |
| 16 | GK | FRA | Baptiste Valette |
| 17 | FW | FRA | Noah Fatar |

| No. | Pos. | Nation | Player |
|---|---|---|---|
| 19 | DF | FRA | Julien Dacosta |
| 20 | FW | BEN | Jodel Dossou |
| 21 | MF | FRA | Dimitri Liénard |
| 22 | FW | MLI | Kévin Zohi |
| 24 | MF | FRA | Malcolm Viltard |
| 25 | MF | FRA | Alex Daho |
| 27 | MF | FRA | Diego Michel |
| 28 | DF | FRA | Maxime Bastian |
| 30 | GK | FRA | Charly Dosso |
| 33 | MF | CMR | Joseph Atangana |
| 33 | FW | FRA | Martin Lecolier |
| 34 | MF | FRA | Allan Ackra |
| 35 | DF | FRA | Dalangunypole Gomis |
| 36 | DF | FRA | Malcolm Rangon |
| 37 | MF | FRA | Elie Kayembe Tete |

=== Out on loan ===
Note: Flags indicate national team as defined under FIFA eligibility rules; some limited exceptions apply. Players may hold more than one non-FIFA nationality.

| No. / Pos. / Nation / Player; — / DF / CMR / Alex Guett Guett (on loan to Progrès Niederkorn) | No. / Pos. / Nation / Player; — / MF / FRA / Gaëtan Weissbeck (on loan to Bordeaux) |

== Transfers ==
=== In ===
| Pos. | Player | Transferred from | Fee | Date | Source |
|---|---|---|---|---|---|
| FW | (Ivory Coast) N'dri Philippe Koffi | (France) Reims | Free | 21 August 2023 | |
| DF | (France) Maxime Bastian | (France) Strasbourg | Free | 25 January 2024 | |

=== Out ===
| Pos. | Player | Transferred to | Fee | Date | Source |
|---|---|---|---|---|---|
| MF | (Senegal) Rassoul Ndiaye | (France) Le Havre | €1,500,000 | 17 July 2023 | |
| DF | (France) Daylam Meddah | Released | | 28 July 2023 | |

== Pre-season and friendlies ==
Win Draw Loss Fixtures

| 22 July 2023 Friendly | Lens (France) | 3–0 | (France) Sochaux | Divonne-les-Bains |
| 11:30 CEST (UTC+2) | Sishuba 6', 18'; Thomasson 35' | | | Stadium: Complexe sportif de Divonne-les-Bains |

| 18 August 2023 Friendly | Sochaux (France) | 1–0 | (France) Vesoul | Montbéliard |
| | Botuluma 21' | | | Stadium: Stade Auguste-Bonal; Attendance: 0 |
Note: Behind closed doors

== Competitions ==
=== Overall record ===
| Competition | First match | Last match | Starting round | Final position | Record | | | | | | | |
| Competition | First match | Last match | Starting round | Final position | Pld | W | D | L | GF | GA | GD | Win % |
|---|---|---|---|---|---|---|---|---|---|---|---|---|
| Championnat National | 25 August 2023 | 17 May 2024 | Matchday 1 | | 24 | 9 | 8 | 7 | 36 | 29 | +7 | 37.50 |
| Coupe de France | 17 November 2023 | 6 February 2024 | Seventh round | Round of 16 | 5 | 3 | 1 | 1 | 11 | 10 | +1 | 60.00 |
| Total | | | | | 29 | 12 | 9 | 8 | 47 | 39 | +8 | 41.38 |

Last updated: 15 March 2024
Source: Soccerway

=== Championnat National ===
==== League table ====
| Pos | Team | Pld | W | D | L | GF | GA | GD | Pts |
|---|---|---|---|---|---|---|---|---|---|
| 6 | Nancy (Note: On 23 June 2023, the FFF announced a deduction of one point for Nancy, applicable to the 2023–24 season, due to incidents in the game against Bourg-Péronnas on the final day of the 2022–23 Championnat National season.) | 34 | 14 | 9 | 11 | 51 | 46 | +5 | 50 |
| 7 | Rouen (Note: On 28 November 2023, the DNCG announced a deduction of five points for Rouen, due to financial issues. The punishment was upheld on appeal.) | 34 | 15 | 9 | 10 | 41 | 37 | +4 | 49 |
| 8 | Sochaux | 34 | 12 | 12 | 10 | 51 | 44 | +7 | 48 |
| 9 | Versailles | 34 | 12 | 11 | 11 | 41 | 33 | +8 | 47 |
| 10 | Orléans | 34 | 11 | 11 | 12 | 36 | 37 | −1 | 44 |

Updated to match(es) played on 18 May 2024. Source: soccerway
Rules for classification: 1) head-to-head results; 2) head-to-head goal difference; 3) goal difference; 4) goals scored; 5) fair play points

==== Results summary ====
| Overall | | | | | | | | Home | | | | | | Away | | | | | |
| Pld | W | D | L | GF | GA | GD | Pts | W | D | L | GF | GA | GD | W | D | L | GF | GA | GD |
|---|---|---|---|---|---|---|---|---|---|---|---|---|---|---|---|---|---|---|---|
| 24 | 9 | 8 | 7 | 36 | 29 | +7 | 35 | 5 | 4 | 3 | 21 | 16 | +5 | 4 | 4 | 4 | 15 | 13 | +2 |

Last updated: 15 March 2024.
Source: Soccerway

==== Results by round ====
| Round | 1 | 2 | 3 | 4 | 5 | 6 | 7 | 8 | 9 | 10 | 11 | 12 | 13 | 14 | 15 | 16 | 17 | 18 | 19 | 20 | 21 | 22 |
|---|---|---|---|---|---|---|---|---|---|---|---|---|---|---|---|---|---|---|---|---|---|---|
| Ground | A | H | A | H | A | A | H | A | H | A | H | A | H | A | H | A | H | A | H | A | H | H |
| Result | D | W | L | L | W | W | L | L | W | D | D | D | W | L | W | W | W | D | D | P | L | D |
| Position | 6 | 1 | 8 | 13 | 10 | 3 | 6 | 9 | 9 | 7 | 7 | 7 | 6 | 8 | 7 | 6 | 6 | | | | | |

Updated to match(es) played on 15 March 2024. Source:
A = Away; H = Home; W = Win; D = Draw; L = Loss; P = Postponed

==== Matches ====
The league fixtures were unveiled on 13 July 2023.

| 25 August 2023 3 | Red Star | 2–0 | Sochaux | Saint-Ouen-sur-Seine |
| 19:30 CEST (UTC+2) | N'Doye 3'; Ifnaoui 13' | Report | | Stadium: Stade Bauer; Referee: Alexandre Perreau Niel |

| 1 September 2023 4 | Sochaux | 0–3 | GOAL FC | Montbéliard |
| 19:30 CEST (UTC+2) | | Report | Camelo 20'; Dufau 27'; Rambaud 47' (pen.) | Stadium: Stade Auguste-Bonal; Referee: Jordane Lomi |

| 8 September 2023 5 | Épinal | 0–3 | Sochaux | Épinal |
| 19:30 CEST (UTC+2) | | Report | Koffi 28' (pen.); Hoggas 72'; Michel 81' | Stadium: Stade de la Colombière; Referee: Edgar Barenton |

| 15 September 2023 6 | Martigues | 1–2 | Sochaux | Martigues |
| CEST (UTC+2) | | | | Stadium: Stade Francis Turcan |

| 25 September 2023 7 | Sochaux | 0–1 | Rouen | Montbéliard |
| CEST (UTC+2) | | | | Stadium: Stade Auguste-Bonal |

| 29 September 2023 8 | Le Mans | 2–1 | Sochaux | Le Mans |
| CEST (UTC+2) | | | | Stadium: Stade Marie-Marvingt |

| 3 October 2023 1 | Versailles | 1–1 | Sochaux | Paris |
| 19:30 CEST (UTC+2) | Diakhaby 5' | Report | Zohi 8' | Stadium: Stade Jean-Bouin; Referee: Romain Perpinan |

| 7 October 2023 9 | Sochaux | 2–1 | Avranches | Montbéliard |
| CEST (UTC+2) | | | | Stadium: Stade Auguste-Bonal |

| 11 October 2023 10 | Châteauroux | 1–1 | Sochaux | Châteauroux |
| CEST (UTC+2) | | | | Stadium: Stade Gaston-Petit |

| 20 October 2023 11 | Sochaux | 3–3 | Villefranche | Montbéliard |
| CEST (UTC+2) | | | | Stadium: Stade Auguste-Bonal |

| 25 October 2023 2 | Sochaux | 4–2 | Orléans | Montbéliard |
| CEST (UTC+2) | | | | Stadium: Stade Auguste-Bonal |

| 3 November 2023 12 | Nancy | 1–1 | Sochaux | Tomblaine |
| | | | | Stadium: Stade Marcel Picot |

| 10 November 2023 13 | Sochaux | 2–0 | Cholet | Montbéliard |
| | | | | Stadium: Stade Auguste-Bonal |

| 27 November 2023 14 | Niort | 4–2 | Sochaux | Niort |

| 1 December 2023 15 | Sochaux | 4–0 | Marignane GCB | Montbéliard |
| | | | | Stadium: Stade Auguste-Bonal |

| 15 December 2023 16 | Dijon | 0–3 | Sochaux | Dijon |

| 15 January 2024 17 | Sochaux | 1–0 | Nîmes | Montbéliard |
| | | | | Stadium: Stade Auguste-Bonal |

| 2 February 2024 19 | Sochaux | 2–2 | Red Star | Montbéliard |
| 19:30 | Dacosta 19', 45+3' | Report | Cissé 48'; Benali 90+6' | Stadium: Stade Auguste-Bonal; Referee: Soulaimane Chamel |

| 16 February 2024 21 | Sochaux | 0–1 | Épinal | Montbéliard |
| 19:30 | | Report | Labissiere 17' | Stadium: Stade Auguste-Bonal; Referee: Pierre Retail |

| 23 February 2024 22 | Sochaux | 1–1 | Martigues | Montbéliard |
| 19:30 | | | | Stadium: Stade Auguste-Bonal |

| 27 February 2024 18 | Orléans | 0–0 | Sochaux | Orléans |
| 19:30 | | | | Stadium: Stade de la Source |

| 4 March 2024 23 | Rouen | 1–0 | Sochaux | Le Petit-Quevilly |
| 18:30 | | | | Stadium: Stade Robert Diochon |

| 26 March 2024 20 | GOAL FC | v | Sochaux | Chasselay |
| 19:00 | | | | Stadium: Stade Ludovic Giuly |
Note: The match was originally scheduled for 10 February 2024 but was postponed.

=== Coupe de France ===
Sochaux entered in the fifth round along with other Championnat National clubs.

| 6 January 2024 Round of 64 | Sochaux | 2–1 | Lorient | Montbéliard |
| 18:00 CET (UTC+1) | Michel (yellow card) 34'; Dacosta (yellow card) 46'; Daho 70'; Macalou 90+3' (pen.) | Report | Makengo (yellow card) 26'; Pelon 34', (yellow card) 75'; Sylla (yellow card) 57' | Stadium: Stade Auguste-Bonal; Attendance: 12,947; Referee: Willy Delajod |

| 21 January 2024 Round of 32 | Sochaux | 2–2 (5–4 p) | Reims | Montbéliard |
| 17:30 CET (UTC+1) | Gomis (yellow card) 16'; Michel 21'; Daho 44' (pen.); Ackra (yellow card) 66' | Report | Agbadou 6', 82'; Bojang (yellow card) 82' | Stadium: Stade Auguste-Bonal; Attendance: 18,754; Referee: Hakim Ben El Hadj |
| | Penalties |
| | Hoggas (penalty scored); Liénard (penalty missed); Zohi (penalty scored); Daho (penalty scored); Macalou (penalty scored); Fontaine (penalty scored) | | (penalty missed) Teuma; (penalty scored) Khadra; (penalty scored) Daramy; (penalty scored) Wilson-Esbrand; (penalty scored) Agbadou; (penalty missed) Okumu |

| 6 February 2024 Round of 16 | Sochaux | 1–6 | Rennes | Montbéliard |
| 20:45 CET (UTC+1) | Viltard 65' (pen.) | Report | Gouiri 24', 47'; Salah 29'; Kalimuendo 35', 41'; Matusiwa (yellow card) 45+2'; Bourigeaud 81' | Stadium: Stade Auguste-Bonal; Referee: Jérémy Stinat |
