= Northern Ireland national football team results (2020–present) =

- Win Draw Loss

This is a list of the Northern Ireland national football team's results from 2020 to the present day.

== 2020s ==
=== 2020 ===
4 September 2020–21 UEFA Nations League B	Romania	1–1	Northern Ireland	Bucharest, Romania
19:45 BST; Match 649	Pușcaș 25'	Report	Whyte 86'	Stadium: Arena Națională; Attendance: 0 Referee: François Letexier (France)

7 September 2020–21 UEFA Nations League B	Northern Ireland	1–5	Norway	Belfast, Northern Ireland
19:45 BST; Match 650	McNair 6'	Report	Elyounoussi 2'; Haaland 7', 58'; Sørloth 19', 47'	Stadium: Windsor Park; Attendance: 0 Referee: Bartosz Frankowski (Poland)

8 October UEFA Euro 2020 Path B play-off semi-final	Bosnia and Herzegovina	1–1 (a.e.t.) (3–4 p)	Northern Ireland	Sarajevo, Bosnia and Herzegovina
19:45 BST; Match 651	Krunić 14'	Report	McGinn 53'	Stadium: Stadion Grbavica (Note: The Bosnia and Herzegovina v Northern Ireland match, originally scheduled to be played at Bilino Polje Stadium, Zenica, was later moved to Stadion Grbavica, Sarajevo.); Attendance: 1,800; Referee: Antonio Mateu Lahoz (Spain)
	Penalties
	Pjanić (penalty scored); Hajradinović (penalty missed); Višća (penalty missed); Hotić (penalty scored); Džeko (penalty scored)		(penalty scored) Dallas; (penalty scored) Lafferty; (penalty missed) Saville; (penalty scored) Washington; (penalty scored) Boyce

11 October 2020–21 UEFA Nations League B	Northern Ireland	0–1	Austria	Belfast, Northern Ireland
19:45 BST; Match 652		Report	Gregoritsch 42'	Stadium: Windsor Park; Attendance: 600; Referee: Petr Ardeleánu (Czech Republic)

14 October 2020–21 UEFA Nations League B	Norway	1–0	Northern Ireland	Oslo, Norway
19:45 BST; Match 653	Dallas 68' (o.g.)	Report		Stadium: Ullevaal Stadion; Attendance: 200; Referee: Kristo Tohver (Estonia)

12 November UEFA Euro 2020 Path B play-off final	Northern Ireland	1–2 (a.e.t.)	Slovakia	Belfast, Northern Ireland
19:45 GMT; Match 654	Škriniar 88' (o.g.)	Report	Kucka 17'; Ďuriš 110'	Stadium: Windsor Park; Attendance: 1,060; Referee: Felix Brych (Germany)

15 November 2020–21 UEFA Nations League B	Austria	2–1	Northern Ireland	Vienna, Austria
19:45 GMT; Match 655	Schaub 81'; Grbić 87'	Report	Magennis 75'	Stadium: Ernst-Happel-Stadion; Attendance: 0 Referee: Maurizio Mariani (Italy)

18 November 2020–21 UEFA Nations League B	Northern Ireland	1–1	Romania	Belfast, Northern Ireland
19:45 GMT; Match 656	Boyce 56'	Report	Bicfalvi 81'	Stadium: Windsor Park; Attendance: 1,060; Referee: Sandro Schärer (Switzerland)

=== 2021 ===
25 March 2022 FIFA World Cup Group C Qualifier	Italy	2–0	Northern Ireland	Parma, Italy
19:45 GMT; Match 657	Berardi 14'; Immobile 39'	Report		Stadium: Stadio Ennio Tardini; Attendance: 0 Referee: Ali Palabıyık (Turkey)

28 March International Friendly	Northern Ireland	1–2	United States	Belfast, Northern Ireland
17:05 BST; Match 658	McGinn 88'	Report	Reyna 30'; Pulisic 59' (pen.)	Stadium: Windsor Park; Attendance: 0 Referee: Robert Jenkins (Wales)

31 March 2022 FIFA World Cup Group C Qualifier	Northern Ireland	0–0	Bulgaria	Belfast, Northern Ireland
19:45 BST; Match 659		Report		Stadium: Windsor Park; Attendance: 0 Referee: Yigal Frid (Israel)

30 May International Friendly	Malta	0–3	Northern Ireland	Klagenfurt, Austria
17:00 BST; Match 660		Report	Jones 2'; Whyte 53'; McCann 55'	Stadium: Wörthersee Stadion; Attendance: 0 Referee: Sebastian Gishamer (Austria)

3 June International Friendly	Ukraine	1–0	Northern Ireland	Dnipro, Ukraine
19:00 BST; Match 661	Zubkov 10'	Report		Stadium: Dnipro-Arena; Attendance: 15,000; Referee: Szymon Marciniak (Poland)

2 September 2022 FIFA World Cup Group C Qualifier	Lithuania	1–4	Northern Ireland	Vilnius, Lithuania
19:45 BST; Match 662	Baravykas 55'	Report	Ballard 20'; Washington 52' (pen.); Lavery 67'; McNair 82' (pen.)	Stadium: LFF Stadium; Attendance: 1,612; Referee: Stéphanie Frappart (France)

5 September International Friendly	Estonia	0–1	Northern Ireland	Tallinn, Estonia
17:00 BST; Match 663		Report	Ferguson 75'	Stadium: A. Le Coq Arena; Attendance: 2,524; Referee: Mads-Kristoffer Kristoffersen (Denmark)

8 September 2022 FIFA World Cup Group C Qualifier	Northern Ireland	0–0	Switzerland	Belfast, Northern Ireland
19:45 BST; Match 664		Report		Stadium: Windsor Park; Attendance: 15,660; Referee: Harald Lechner (Austria)

9 October 2022 FIFA World Cup Group C Qualifier	Switzerland	2–0	Northern Ireland	Geneva, Switzerland
19:45 BST; Match 665	Zuber 45+3'; Fassnacht 90+1'	Report		Stadium: Stade de Genève; Attendance: 19,129; Referee: Slavko Vinčić (Slovenia)

12 October 2022 FIFA World Cup Group C Qualifier	Bulgaria	2–1	Northern Ireland	Sofia, Bulgaria
19:45 BST; Match 666	Nedelev 53', 63'	Report	Washington 35'	Stadium: Vasil Levski National Stadium; Attendance: 822; Referee: Aleksei Kulbakov (Belarus)

12 November 2022 FIFA World Cup Group C Qualifier	Northern Ireland	1–0	Lithuania	Belfast, Northern Ireland
19:45 GMT; Match 667	Šatkus 18' (o.g.)	Report		Stadium: Windsor Park; Attendance: 14,336; Referee: István Vad (Hungary)

15 November 2022 FIFA World Cup Group C Qualifier	Northern Ireland	0–0	Italy	Belfast, Northern Ireland
19:45 GMT; Match 668		Report		Stadium: Windsor Park; Attendance: 15,969; Referee: István Kovács (Romania)

=== 2022 ===
25 March International Friendly	Luxembourg	1–3	Northern Ireland	Luxembourg City, Luxembourg
19:15 GMT; Match 669	Da Graça 58'	Report	Magennis 16'; Davis 83'; Whyte 85'	Stadium: Stade de Luxembourg; Attendance: 4,500; Referee: Daniel Schlager (Germany)

29 March International Friendly	Northern Ireland	0–1	Hungary	Belfast, Northern Ireland
19:45 BST; Match 670		Report	Sallai 55'	Stadium: Windsor Park; Attendance: 18,000; Referee: Rob Harvey (Republic of Ireland)

2 June 2022–23 UEFA Nations League C	Northern Ireland	0–1	Greece	Belfast, Northern Ireland
19:45 BST; Match 671		Report	Bakasetas 39'	Stadium: Windsor Park; Attendance: 16,977; Referee: Erik Lambrechts (Belgium)

5 June 2022–23 UEFA Nations League C	Cyprus	0–0	Northern Ireland	Larnaca, Cyprus
17:00 BST; Match 672		Report		Stadium: AEK Arena – Georgios Karapatakis; Attendance: 1,663; Referee: Enea Jorgji (Albania)

9 June 2022–23 UEFA Nations League C	Kosovo	3–2	Northern Ireland	Pristina, Kosovo
19:45 BST; Match 673	Muriqi 9' (pen.), 52'; Bytyqi 19'	Report	Lavery 44'; Ballard 83'	Stadium: Fadil Vokrri Stadium; Attendance: 11,700; Referee: Jakob Kehlet (Denmark)

12 June 2022–23 UEFA Nations League C	Northern Ireland	2–2	Cyprus	Belfast, Northern Ireland
14:00 BST; Match 674	McNair 71'; J. Evans 90+4'	Report	Kakoullis 32', 51'	Stadium: Windsor Park; Attendance: 16,454; Referee: Ricardo de Burgos Bengoetxea (Spain)

24 September 2022–23 UEFA Nations League C	Northern Ireland	2–1	Kosovo	Belfast, Northern Ireland
17:00 BST; Match 675	Whyte 82'; Magennis 90+3'	Report	Muriqi 58'	Stadium: Windsor Park; Attendance: 17,148; Referee: Glenn Nyberg (Sweden)

27 September 2022–23 UEFA Nations League C	Greece	3–1	Northern Ireland	Athens, Greece
19:45 BST; Match 676	Pelkas 14'; Masouras 55'; Mantalos 80'	Report	Lavery 18'	Stadium: Agia Sophia Stadium; Attendance: 5,871; Referee: Filip Glova (Slovakia)

=== 2023 ===
23 March UEFA Euro 2024 Group H Qualifier	San Marino	0–2	Northern Ireland	Serravalle, San Marino
19:45 GMT; Match 677		Report	D. Charles 24', 55'	Stadium: Stadio Olimpico de Serravalle; Attendance: 2,099; Referee: Gergő Bogár (Hungary)

26 March UEFA Euro 2024 Group H Qualifier	Northern Ireland	0–1	Finland	Belfast, Northern Ireland
19:45 BST; Match 678		Report	Källman 28'	Stadium: Windsor Park; Attendance: 17,936; Referee: Ivan Kružliak (Slovakia)

16 June UEFA Euro 2024 Group H Qualifier	Denmark	1–0	Northern Ireland	Copenhagen, Denmark
19:45 BST; Match 679	Wind 47'	Report		Stadium: Parken Stadium; Attendance: 35,701; Referee: Daniel Stefański (Poland)

19 June UEFA Euro 2024 Group H Qualifier	Northern Ireland	0–1	Kazakhstan	Belfast, Northern Ireland
19:45 BST; Match 680		Report	Aymbetov 88'	Stadium: Windsor Park; Attendance: 18,002; Referee: Roi Reinshreiber (Israel)

7 September UEFA Euro 2024 Group H Qualifier	Slovenia	4–2	Northern Ireland	Ljubljana, Slovenia
19:45 BST; Match 681	Šporar 3', 56'; Evans 17' (o.g.); Šeško 42'	Report	Price 7'; Evans 53'	Stadium: Stožice Stadium; Attendance: 12,587; Referee: Marco Guida (Italy)

10 September UEFA Euro 2024 Group H Qualifier	Kazakhstan	1–0	Northern Ireland	Astana, Kazakhstan
14:00 BST; Match 682	Samorodov 27'	Report		Stadium: Astana Arena; Attendance: 28,458; Referee: Daniel Schlager (Germany)

14 October UEFA Euro 2024 Group H Qualifier	Northern Ireland	3–0	San Marino	Belfast, Northern Ireland
14:00 BST; Match 683	Smyth 5'; Magennis 11'; McMenamin 81'	Report		Stadium: Windsor Park; Attendance: 17,886; Referee: Bram Van Driessche (Belgium)

17 October UEFA Euro 2024 Group H Qualifier	Northern Ireland	0–1	Slovenia	Belfast, Northern Ireland
19:45 BST; Match 684		Report	Gnezda Čerin 5'	Stadium: Windsor Park; Attendance: 16,332; Referee: István Kovács (Romania)

17 November UEFA Euro 2024 Group H Qualifier	Finland	4–0	Northern Ireland	Helsinki, Finland
17:00 GMT; Match 685	Pohjanpalo 42' (pen.); Håkans 48'; Pukki 73'; Lod 88'	Report		Stadium: Helsinki Olympic Stadium; Attendance: 28,711; Referee: Aliyar Aghayev (Azerbaijan)

20 November UEFA Euro 2024 Group H Qualifier	Northern Ireland	2–0	Denmark	Belfast, Northern Ireland
19:45 GMT; Match 686	Price 60'; Charles 81'	Report		Stadium: Windsor Park; Attendance: 17,366; Referee: Jérôme Brisard (France)

=== 2024 ===
22 March International Friendly	Romania	1–1	Northern Ireland	Bucharest, Romania
19:45 GMT; Match 687	Man 23'	Report	Reid 7'	Stadium: Arena Națională; Attendance: 30,439; Referee: Kristoffer Karlsson (Sweden)

26 March International Friendly	Scotland	0–1	Northern Ireland	Glasgow, Scotland
19:45 GMT; Match 688		Report	Bradley 32'	Stadium: Hampden Park; Attendance: 33,452; Referee: Robert Jones (England)

8 June International Friendly	Spain	5–1	Northern Ireland	Palma, Spain
20:30 BST; Match 689	Pedri 12', 29'; Morata 18'; Fabián 35'; Oyarzabal 60'	Report	Ballard 2'	Stadium: Estadi Mallorca Son Moix; Attendance: 18,300; Referee: Bastien Dechepy (France)

11 June International Friendly	Andorra	0–2	Northern Ireland	Murcia, Spain
19:45 BST; Match 690		Report	Bradley 16', 22'	Stadium: Estadio Nueva Condomina; Attendance: 500; Referee: Jason Barcelo (Gibraltar)

5 September 2024–25 UEFA Nations League C	Northern Ireland	2–0	Luxembourg	Belfast, Northern Ireland
19:45 BST; Match 691	McNair 11'; Ballard 16'	Report		Stadium: Windsor Park; Attendance: 17,213; Referee: Marian Barbu (Romania)

8 September 2024–25 UEFA Nations League C	Bulgaria	1–0	Northern Ireland	Plovdiv, Bulgaria
17:00 BST; Match 692	Despodov 40'	Report		Stadium: Stadion Hristo Botev; Attendance: 14,300; Referee: Tasos Sidiropoulos (Greece)

12 October 2024–25 UEFA Nations League C	Belarus	0–0	Northern Ireland	Zalaegerszeg, Hungary
19:45 BST; Match 693		Report		Stadium: ZTE Arena; Attendance: 0 Referee: Henrik Nalbandyan (Armenia)

15 October 2024–25 UEFA Nations League C	Northern Ireland	5–0	Bulgaria	Belfast, Northern Ireland
19:45 BST; Match 694	Price 15', 29', 81' Mitov 32' (o.g.) Magennis 89'	Report		Stadium: Windsor Park; Attendance: 17,891; Referee: Jérôme Brisard (France)

15 November 2024–25 UEFA Nations League C	Northern Ireland	2–0	Belarus	Belfast, Northern Ireland
19:45 GMT; Match 695	Ballard 50'; D. Charles 63' (pen.)	Report		Stadium: Windsor Park; Attendance: 18,044; Referee: Luis Godinho (Portugal)

18 November 2024–25 UEFA Nations League C	Luxembourg	2–2	Northern Ireland	Luxembourg City, Luxembourg
19:45 GMT; Match 696	Korać 72'; Rodrigues 75'	Report	Price 19'; Bradley 50'	Stadium: Stade de Luxembourg; Attendance: 6,870; Referee: Elchin Masiyev (Azerbaijan)

=== 2025 ===
21 March International Friendly	Northern Ireland	1–1	Switzerland	Belfast, Northern Ireland
19:45 GMT; Match 697	Price 16'	Report	Sierro 29'	Stadium: Windsor Park; Attendance: 17,862; Referee: Mohammed Al-Hakim (Sweden)

25 March International Friendly	Sweden	5–1	Northern Ireland	Solna, Sweden
18:00 GMT; Match 698	Holm 7'; Nygren 33'; Sema 59'; Isak 64'; Elanga 77'	Report	Price 90'	Stadium: Nationalarenan; Attendance: 14,147; Referee: Matthew MacDermid (Scotland)

7 June International Friendly	Denmark	2–1	Northern Ireland	Copenhagen, Denmark
18:00 BST; Match 699	Isaksen 45+2'; Eriksen 67'	Report	P. Højbjerg 6' (o.g.)	Stadium: Parken Stadium; Attendance: 22,151; Referee: Antoniou Menelaus (Cyprus)

10 June International Friendly	Northern Ireland	1–0	Iceland	Belfast, Northern Ireland
19:45 BST; Match 700	Price 36'	Report		Stadium: Windsor Park; Attendance: 18,021; Referee: Morten Krogh (Denmark)

4 September 2026 FIFA World Cup Group A Qualifier	Luxembourg	1–3	Northern Ireland	Luxembourg City, Luxembourg
19:45 BST; Match 701	Dardari 30'	Report	Reid 7' S. Charles 46' Devenny 70'	Stadium: Stade de Luxembourg; Attendance: 9,214; Referee: Andris Treimanis (Latvia)

7 September 2026 FIFA World Cup Group A Qualifier	Germany	3–1	Northern Ireland	Cologne, Germany
19:45 BST; Match 702	Gnabry 7'; Amiri 69'; Wirtz 72'	Report	Price 34'	Stadium: RheinEnergieStadion; Attendance: 43,169; Referee: Espen Eskås (Norway)

10 October 2026 FIFA World Cup Group A Qualifier	Northern Ireland	2–0	Slovakia	Belfast, Northern Ireland
19:45 BST; Match 703	Hrošovský 18' (o.g.); Hume 81'	Report		Stadium: Windsor Park; Attendance: 18,109; Referee: Glenn Nyberg (Sweden)

13 October 2026 FIFA World Cup Group A Qualifier	Northern Ireland	0–1	Germany	Belfast, Northern Ireland
19:45 BST; Match 704		Report	Woltemade 31'	Stadium: Windsor Park; Attendance: 17,926; Referee: Jesús Gil Manzano (Spain)

14 November 2026 FIFA World Cup Group A Qualifier	Slovakia	1–0	Northern Ireland	Košice, Slovakia
19:45 GMT; Match 705	Bobček 90+1'	Report		Stadium: Košická futbalová aréna Attendance: 12,093; Referee: István Kovács (Romania)

17 November 2026 FIFA World Cup Group A Qualifier	Northern Ireland	1–0	Luxembourg	Belfast, Northern Ireland
19:45 GMT; Match 706	Donley 44' (pen.)	Report		Stadium: Windsor Park; Attendance: 18,037; Referee: Kristo Tohver (Estonia)

=== 2026 ===
26 March 2026 FIFA World Cup Qualifier play-offs	Italy	2–0	Northern Ireland	Bergamo, Italy
19:45 GMT; Match 707	Tonali 56'; Kean 80'	Report		Stadium: Stadio Atleti Azzurri d'Italia; Attendance: 23,439; Referee: Danny Makkelie (Netherlands)

31 March International Friendly	Wales	1–1	Northern Ireland	Cardiff, Wales
19:45 BST; Match 708	Thomas 46'	Report	Donley 22'	Stadium: Cardiff City Stadium; Attendance: 33,280; Referee: Robert Hennessy (Ireland)

4 June International Friendly	Northern Ireland	1–0	Guinea	La Línea de la Concepción, Spain
17:00 BST; Match 709	Atcheson 9'	Report		Stadium: Estadio Municipal de La Línea de la Concepción; Attendance: 297; Referee: Seth Galia (Gibraltar)

8 June International Friendly	France	3–1	Northern Ireland	Villeneuve-d'Ascq, France
20:10 BST; Match 710	Olise 43', 49', 75'	Report	Kelly 64'	Stadium: Stade Pierre-Mauroy; Attendance: 43,272; Referee: Sascha Stegemann (Germany)

25 September 2026–27 UEFA Nations League B	Georgia	0–1	Northern Ireland	Tbilisi, Georgia
17:00 BST; Match 711		Report	Charles 90+9'	Stadium: Boris Paichadze Dinamo Arena; Attendance: 7,470; Referee: Orel Grinfeeld (Israel)

28 September 2026–27 UEFA Nations League B	Northern Ireland	0–0	Hungary	Belfast, Northern Ireland
19:45 BST; Match 712		Report		Stadium: Windsor Park; Attendance: 18,082; Referee: Ricardo de Burgos Bengoetxea (Spain)

2 October 2026–27 UEFA Nations League B	Ukraine	0–3	Northern Ireland	Trnava, Slovakia (Note: Due to the Russian invasion of Ukraine, Ukraine are required to play their home matches at neutral venues until further notice.)
19:45 BST; Match 713		Report	Brown 9', 61'; Price 22'	Stadium: Anton Malatinský Stadium; Attendance: 7,080; Referee: Jasper Vergoote (Belgium)

5 October 2026–27 UEFA Nations League B	Northern Ireland	0–0	Georgia	Belfast, Northern Ireland
19:45 BST; Match 714		Report		Stadium: Windsor Park; Attendance: 18,140; Referee: Sebastian Gishamer (Austria)

14 November 2026–27 UEFA Nations League B	Northern Ireland	1–0	Ukraine	Belfast, Northern Ireland
19:45 GMT; Match 715	Devlin 68'	Report		Stadium: Windsor Park; Attendance: 18,225; Referee: François Letexier (France)

17 November 2026–27 UEFA Nations League B	Hungary	1–1	Northern Ireland	Budapest, Hungary
19:45 GMT; Match 716	Varga 35'	Report	Devenny 65'	Stadium: Puskás Aréna; Attendance: 55,306; Referee: Marco Guida (Italy)
