= Nolan Galves =

French footballer (born 2002)

Personal information
- Date of birth: 23 July 2003 (age 23)
- Place of birth: Montbéliard, France
- Height: 1.80 m (5 ft 11 in)
- Position: Right-back

Team information
- Current team: West Bromwich Albion
- Number: 25

Youth career
- ETS Exincourt Taillecourt
- 2013–2021: Sochaux

Senior career*
Years	Team	Apps	(Gls)
2021–2024	Sochaux II	35	(0)
2021–2024	Sochaux	27	(0)
2024–2026	Rodez	63	(2)
2026–	West Bromwich Albion	2	(0)
- * Club domestic league appearances and goals as of 13:42, 11 May 2026 (UTC)

Nolan Galves (born 23 July 2003) is a French professional footballer who plays as a right-back for EFL Championship club West Bromwich Albion.

== Club career ==
=== Early career ===
Galves is a product of the youth academies of the French clubs ETS Exincourt Taillecourt and Sochaux-Montbéliard. In 2021, he was promoted to Sochaux's reserves and started making appearances with the senior team in National 3.

On 3 May 2021, Galves signed his first professional contract with Sochaux. He made his first team debut in November 2021, aged just 18, in the Coupe de France.

=== Rodez ===
On 30 August 2024, he transferred to Rodez on a three-year contract.

In his debut season, Galves made 31 league appearances, scoring twice and making a three further assists.

In the 2025-26 season, Galves made 32 league appearances and registered 7 assists in a campaign which saw Rodez finish 5th. He made 49 successful crosses, more than anyone in Ligue 2. Galves provided an assist which saw Rodez equalise in the play-off quarter final with Red Star. Rodez lost to Ligue 1 club Saint-Étienne in the final, ending an unbeaten run which began in November 2025, of which Galves only missed one game.

=== West Bromwich Albion ===
On 28 July 2026, Galves joined Championship club West Bromwich Albion on a four-year contract for an undisclosed fee.

== Career statistics ==
As of match played 15 May 2026

Appearances and goals by club, season and competition
Club	Season	League			National cup (Note: Includes Coupe de France)		Other		Total	
Club	Season	Division	Apps	Goals	Apps	Goals	Apps	Goals	Apps	Goals
Sochaux	2021–22	Ligue 2	0	0	1	0	0	0	1	0
Sochaux	2022–23	Ligue 2	4	0	1	0	—		5	0
Sochaux	2023–24	Championnat National	23	0	3	0	—		26	0
Sochaux	Total		27	0	5	0	0	0	32	0
Rodez	2024–25	Ligue 2	31	2	1	0	—		32	2
Rodez	2025–26	Ligue 2	32	0	2	0	2 (Note: Appearances in Ligue 2 promotion play-offs)	0	36	0
Rodez	Total		63	2	3	0	2	0	68	2
West Bromwich Albion	2026–27	Championship	2	0	1	0	—		0	0
Career total			90	2	8	0	2	0	100	2
