= Isaac Price =

Northern Irish footballer (born 2003)

Personal information
- Full name: Isaac Jude Price
- Date of birth: 26 September 2003 (age 23)
- Place of birth: Pontefract, England
- Height: 1.88 m (6 ft 2 in)
- Position: Midfielder

Team information
- Current team: West Bromwich Albion
- Number: 21

Youth career
- 2010–2022: Everton

Senior career*
Years	Team	Apps	(Gls)
2022–2023	Everton	2	(0)
2023–2025	Standard Liège	59	(1)
2025–	West Bromwich Albion	76	(16)

International career^{‡}
2018	Northern Ireland U16	2	(0)
2019	Northern Ireland U17	2	(0)
2021	Northern Ireland U19	3	(0)
2022	Northern Ireland U21	3	(0)
2023–	Northern Ireland	38	(11)
- * Club domestic league appearances and goals as of 14:37, 18 November 2026 (UTC) ‡ National team caps and goals as of 14:37, 18 November 2026 (UTC)

Isaac Jude Price (born 26 September 2003) is a professional footballer who plays as a midfielder for EFL Championship club West Bromwich Albion. Born in England, he plays for the Northern Ireland national team.

== Early and personal life ==
Price was born in Pontefract, Yorkshire and raised in Normanton, Yorkshire. His paternal grandmother was born in Belfast, Northern Ireland and he also has ancestry from the Republic of Ireland and Germany.

== Club career ==
=== Everton ===
Price joined the Everton academy at the age of 7. In September 2020, he signed his first professional contract with the club, for three years. On 3 March 2022, he made his professional debut as an 89th-minute substitute in the 2–0 FA Cup victory over Boreham Wood. On 22 May, he made his Premier League debut as a 78th-minute replacement for Tom Davies in a 5–1 loss to Arsenal on the final day of the season.

=== Standard Liege ===
On 10 June 2023, Price signed a four-year deal for Standard Liège of the Belgian Pro League. He made his debut for the club on 30 July 2023, in a 1–0 defeat to Sint-Truiden. He scored his first club goal on 8 October 2023, a last-minute winner in a 2–1 home victory against Club Brugge KV.

=== West Bromwich Albion ===
On 22 January 2025, Price returned to England, signing for Championship club West Bromwich Albion on a four-and-a-half year deal for an undisclosed fee. He made his debut for the club on 25 January 2025, in a 5–1 win against Portsmouth. He scored his first goal for the club on 15 March 2025, in a 1–1 draw with Hull City.

== International career ==
Price was eligible to play internationally for Germany or the Republic of Ireland, and was tracked by England before opting for Northern Ireland.

On 7 March 2023, he received his first call-up to the Northern Irish senior national team for the UEFA Euro 2024 qualifying matches against San Marino and Finland. On 23 March, he made his senior international debut as a substitute in the 2–0 win over San Marino. On 7 September 2023, Price scored his first goal for Northern Ireland, an equaliser in the 4–2 defeat away to Slovenia in a Euro 2024 qualifier.

On 15 October 2024, Price scored a hat-trick in a 5–0 victory over Bulgaria in the UEFA Nations League. In doing so, he became the first Northern Irish player to score at least two goals in a match at Windsor Park since Kyle Lafferty in 2016. It was also only the fourth time Northern Ireland has ever scored five goals in a match.

== Career statistics ==
=== Club ===
As of match played 7 November 2026

Appearances and goals by club, season and competition
Club	Season	League			National Cup (Note: Includes FA Cup, Belgian Cup)		League Cup (Note: Includes EFL Cup)		Other		Total	
Club	Season	Division	Apps	Goals	Apps	Goals	Apps	Goals	Apps	Goals	Apps	Goals
Everton	2021–22	Premier League	1	0	1	0	0	0	—		2	0
Everton	2022–23	Premier League	1	0	0	0	0	0	—		1	0
Everton	Total		2	0	1	0	0	0	0	0	3	0
Standard Liège	2023–24	Belgian Pro League	37	1	2	0	—		—		39	1
Standard Liège	2024–25	Belgian Pro League	22	0	2	0	—		—		24	0
Standard Liège	Total		59	1	4	0	0	0	0	0	63	1
West Bromwich Albion	2024–25	Championship	15	1	0	0	0	0	—		15	1
West Bromwich Albion	2025–26	Championship	46	9	2	0	1	0	—		49	9
West Bromwich Albion	2026–27	Championship	15	6	0	0	2	2	—		17	8
West Bromwich Albion	Total		76	16	2	0	3	2	0	0	81	18
Career total			137	17	7	0	3	2	0	0	147	19

=== International ===
As of 17 November 2026

Appearances and goals by national team and year
National team	Year	Apps	Goals
Northern Ireland	2023	9	2
Northern Ireland	2024	9	4
Northern Ireland	2025	10	4
Northern Ireland	2026	10	1
Total		38	11

Scores and results list Northern Ireland's goal tally first, score column indicates score after each Price goal.

List of international goals scored by Isaac Price
No.	Date	Venue	Cap	Opponent	Score	Result	Competition	Source
1	7 September 2023	Stožice Stadium, Ljubljana, Slovenia	5	Slovenia	1–1	2–4	UEFA Euro 2024 Qualifier	
2	20 November 2023	Windsor Park, Belfast, Northern Ireland	9	Denmark	1–0	2–0	UEFA Euro 2024 Qualifier	
3	15 October 2024	Windsor Park, Belfast, Northern Ireland	16	Bulgaria	1–0	5–0	2024–25 UEFA Nations League C	
4	15 October 2024	Windsor Park, Belfast, Northern Ireland	16	Bulgaria	2–0	5–0	2024–25 UEFA Nations League C	
5	15 October 2024	Windsor Park, Belfast, Northern Ireland	16	Bulgaria	4–0	5–0	2024–25 UEFA Nations League C	
6	18 November 2024	Stade de Luxembourg, Luxembourg City, Luxembourg	18	Luxembourg	1–0	2–2	2024–25 UEFA Nations League C	
7	21 March 2025	Windsor Park, Belfast, Northern Ireland	19	Switzerland	1–0	1–1	Friendly	
8	25 March 2025	Nationalarenan, Solna, Sweden	20	Sweden	1–5	1–5	Friendly	
9	10 June 2025	Windsor Park, Belfast, Northern Ireland	22	Iceland	1–0	1–0	Friendly	
10	7 September 2025	RheinEnergieStadion, Cologne, Germany	24	Germany	1–1	1–3	2026 FIFA World Cup qualification	
11	2 October 2026	Štadión Antona Malatinského, Trnava, Slovakia	35	Ukraine	2–0	3–0	2026–27 UEFA Nations League B	
