= Kareem Tunde =

Spanish footballer

Personal information
- Full name: Kareem Tunde Ruiz
- Date of birth: 19 August 2005 (age 21)
- Place of birth: Barcelona, Spain
- Height: 1.77 m (5 ft 10 in)
- Position: Winger

Team information
- Current team: West Bromwich Albion
- Number: 26

Youth career
- Sant Andreu
- 2014–2017: Espanyol
- 2017–2020: Barcelona
- 2020–2022: Damm
- 2022–2024: Levante

Senior career*
| Years | Team | Apps | (Gls) |
| 2024–2025 | Levante B | 48 | (2) |
| 2025–2026 | Levante | 22 | (0) |
| 2026– | West Bromwich Albion | 1 | (0) |
- * Club domestic league appearances and goals as of 29 August 2026 (UTC)

Kareem Tunde Ruiz (born 19 August 2005) is a Spanish professional footballer who plays as a right winger for EFL Championship club West Bromwich Albion.

== Early life ==
Kareem Tunde Ruiz was born in Barcelona, Catalonia to a Nigerian father and a Spanish mother.

== Career ==
=== Early career ===
Tunde joined Barcelona's La Masia in June 2017 from Espanyol. He left the club in 2020, and spent two years at Damm before moving to the youth categories of Levante.

=== Levante ===
Tunde made his senior debut with the reserves on 7 January 2024, playing the last 13 minutes of a 1–1 Tercera Federación home draw against Soneja. On 28 May, he renewed his contract with the Granotes until 2026, with an option for a further three years.

After establishing himself as a regular starter for the B-team, Tunde made his first team – and La Liga – debut on 20 December 2025, coming on as a second-half substitute for Jeremy Toljan in a 1–1 home draw against Real Sociedad. The following 1 March, he further extended his link until 2029.

=== West Bromwich Albion ===
On 27 August 2026, Tunde joined Championship side West Bromwich Albion on a four-year contract for an undisclosed fee. He made his debut for the club on 29 August 2026, in a 3–1 defeat to Middlesbrough.

== Career statistics ==
As of match played 29 August 2026

Appearances and goals by club, season and competition
| Club | Season | League | | | National Cup (Note: Includes Copa del Rey, FA Cup) | | League Cup (Note: Includes EFL Cup) | | Other | | Total | |
| Club | Season | Division | Apps | Goals | Apps | Goals | Apps | Goals | Apps | Goals | Apps | Goals |
|---|---|---|---|---|---|---|---|---|---|---|---|---|
| Levante | 2025–26 | La Liga | 21 | 0 | 0 | 0 | — | | — | | 21 | 0 |
| Levante | 2026–27 | La Liga | 1 | 0 | 0 | 0 | — | | — | | 1 | 0 |
| Levante | Total | | 22 | 0 | 0 | 0 | 0 | 0 | 0 | 0 | 22 | 0 |
| West Bromwich Albion | 2026–27 | Championship | 1 | 0 | 0 | 0 | 0 | 0 | — | | 1 | 0 |
| Career total | | | 23 | 0 | 0 | 0 | 0 | 0 | 0 | 0 | 23 | 0 |
