= Max O'Leary =

Irish footballer (born 1996)

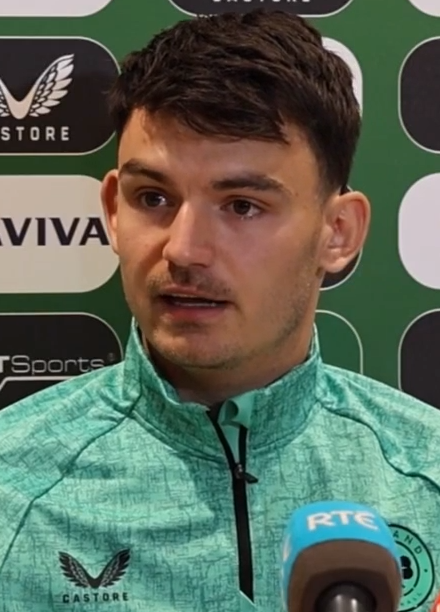
- O'Leary in 2025

Personal information
- Full name: Max Edward O'Leary
- Date of birth: 10 October 1996 (age 30)
- Place of birth: Bath, England
- Height: 6 ft 2 in (1.89 m)
- Position: Goalkeeper

Team information
- Current team: West Bromwich Albion
- Number: 1

Youth career
- 2006–2015: Bristol City

Senior career*
Years	Team	Apps	(Gls)
2013–2026	Bristol City	157	(0)
2016	→ Kidderminster Harriers (loan)	5	(0)
2016–2017	→ Bath City (loan)	37	(0)
2017–2018	→ Solihull Moors (loan)	6	(0)
2018	→ Solihull Moors (loan)	17	(0)
2019–2020	→ Shrewsbury Town (loan)	30	(0)
2026–	West Bromwich Albion	31	(0)

International career^{‡}
2025–	Republic of Ireland	2	(0)
- * Club domestic league appearances and goals as of 23:36, 09 November 2026 (UTC) ‡ National team caps and goals as of 23:16, 16 May 2026 (UTC)

Max Edward O'Leary (born 10 October 1996) is a professional footballer who plays as a goalkeeper for EFL Championship club West Bromwich Albion. Born in England, he plays for the Republic of Ireland national team.

== Early life ==
Born in Bath, Somerset, O'Leary attended Beechen Cliff School alongside fellow Bristol City academy graduate Zak Vyner.

== Club career ==
=== Bristol City ===
He began his career with Bristol City and was first included in a matchday squad on 22 October 2013, remaining an unused substitute in a 2–1 home loss to Brentford.

On 9 January 2016, O'Leary was on the bench in a Bristol City squad with only six substitutes due to squad depletion. He came on at half time in the 2–2 draw away to West Bromwich Albion in the FA Cup third round, replacing the injured Frank Fielding.

O'Leary joined National League side Kidderminster Harriers on 18 March 2016, on loan until the end of the season. He was recalled a month later when Fielding was ruled out with injury for the rest of the season.

On 26 August 2016, O'Leary joined National League South side Bath City on loan until 31 January 2017. His spell at his hometown club was extended to the end of the season.

O'Leary joined National League side Solihull Moors on loan on 24 November 2017, until the following 6 January, but was recalled on 1 January 2018 due to Fielding being suspended. O'Leary eventually rejoined Solihull on loan until the end of the season, once Fielding had returned from his suspension.

In July 2018, O'Leary signed a new three-year deal with the option of a fourth at Bristol City. On 17 October, manager Lee Johnson announced O'Leary would make his full league debut in the following weekend fixture away at Brentford. He kept a clean sheet in the 1–0 win at Griffin Park on 20 October.

On 5 July 2019, O'Leary signed for League One side Shrewsbury Town on a one-year loan. In 2023, O'Leary further committed his future at Bristol City by signing a three-year deal, receiving the number 1 jersey.

=== West Bromwich Albion ===
On 22 January 2026, O'Leary signed for West Bromwich Albion on a short-term contract until the end of the season.

On 15 May 2026, the club said it had offered the player a new contract. On 2 June 2026, he signed a new three-year deal with the club.

== International career ==
On 25 May 2019, O'Leary was called up to the Republic of Ireland national team for the first time to replace the injured Mark Travers, ahead of UEFA Euro 2020 qualifying matches against Denmark and Gibraltar, qualifying through a County Kerry-born grandfather. On 24 March 2022, he was called into the squad for their friendly matches against Belgium and Lithuania following injuries to Gavin Bazunu and Mark Travers and again in June because of injuries to Gavin Bazunu and James Talbot. On 10 June 2025, O'Leary made his international debut, in a friendly away to Luxembourg, 6 years after his first call up.

== Career statistics ==
=== Club ===
As of match played 17 October 2026

Appearances and goals by club, season and competition
Club	Season	League			FA Cup		League Cup		Other		Total	
Club	Season	Division	Apps	Goals	Apps	Goals	Apps	Goals	Apps	Goals	Apps	Goals
Bristol City	2015–16	Championship	0	0	2	0	0	0	—		2	0
Bristol City	2016–17	Championship	0	0	0	0	0	0	—		0	0
Bristol City	2017–18	Championship	0	0	0	0	0	0	—		0	0
Bristol City	2018–19	Championship	15	0	0	0	1	0	—		16	0
Bristol City	2020–21	Championship	3	0	2	0	2	0	—		7	0
Bristol City	2021–22	Championship	9	0	1	0	1	0	—		11	0
Bristol City	2022–23	Championship	33	0	4	0	0	0	—		37	0
Bristol City	2023–24	Championship	46	0	4	0	2	0	—		52	0
Bristol City	2024–25	Championship	46	0	1	0	0	0	2 (Note: Appearances in the EFL Championship play-offs)	0	49	0
Bristol City	2025–26	Championship	5	0	0	0	0	0	—		5	0
Bristol City	Total		157	0	14	0	6	0	2	0	179	0
Kidderminster Harriers (loan)	2015–16	National League	5	0	0	0	—		0	0	5	0
Bath City (loan)	2016–17	National League South	37	0	0	0	—		1 (Note: Appearances in FA Trophy)	0	38	0
Solihull Moors (loan)	2017–18	National League	23	0	0	0	—		2	0	25	0
Shrewsbury Town (loan)	2019–20	League One	30	0	3	0	0	0	1 (Note: Appearance in EFL Trophy)	0	34	0
West Bromwich Albion	2025–26	Championship	16	0	1	0	0	0	—		17	0
West Bromwich Albion	2026–27	Championship	11	0	0	0	1	0	—		12	0
West Bromwich Albion	Total		27	0	1	0	1	0	0	0	29	0
Career total			279	0	18	0	7	0	6	0	310	0

=== International ===
As of match played 16 May 2026

Appearances and goals by national team and year
National team	Year	Apps	Goals
Republic of Ireland
Republic of Ireland	2025	1	0
Republic of Ireland	2026	1	0
Total		2	0
