= 2024–25 Rodez AF season =

Rodez AF
2024–25 season
- Manager: Didier Santini
- Stadium: Stade Paul-Lignon
- Ligue 2: Pre-season
- Coupe de France: Pre-season

The 2024–25 season is the 96th season in the history of the Rodez AF, and the club's sixth consecutive season in Ligue 2. In addition to the domestic league, the team will participate in the Coupe de France.

== Transfers ==
=== In ===
Pos.	Player	Transferred from	Fee	Date	Source
DF	(France) Loni Quenabio	(France) Marignane Gignac	Free	1 July 2024	
DF	(France) Nolan Galves	(France) Sochaux		30 August 2024	

=== Out ===
Pos.	Player	Transferred to	Fee	Date	Source
DF	(France) Bradley Danger	(France) Red Star FC	End of contract	1 July 2024	
DF	(France) Serge-Philippe Raux-Yao	(Austria) Rapid Vienna	Free	1 July 2024	

== Friendlies ==
=== Pre-season ===
13 July 2024 Friendly	Toulouse (France)	2–1	(France) Rodez

19 July 2024 Friendly	Rodez (France)	0–0	(France) Grenoble
18:00

27 July 2024 Friendly	Bastia (France)	1–2	(France) Rodez
18:00

31 July 2024 Friendly	Rodez (France)	2–0	(France) Le Puy Foot 43 Auvergne
18:15

3 August 2024 Friendly	Rodez (France)	1–4	(France) Pau FC
17:00

== Competitions ==
=== Overall record ===
Competition	First match	Last match	Starting round	Record							
Competition	First match	Last match	Starting round	Pld	W	D	L	GF	GA	GD	Win %
Ligue 2	16–18 August 2024	10 May 2025	Matchday 1	0	0	0	0	0	0	+0	—
Coupe de France				0	0	0	0	0	0	+0	—
Total				0	0	0	0	0	0	+0	—

Source: Soccerway

=== Ligue 2 ===
==== League table ====
Pos	Team	Pld	W	D	L	GF	GA	GD	Pts	Promotion or Relegation
12	Ajaccio (Note: Ajaccio were relegated due to financial reasons.) (D, R)	34	12	6	16	30	42	−12	42	Administrative relegation to Régional 2
13	Pau	34	10	12	12	39	53	−14	42	
14	Rodez	34	9	12	13	56	54	+2	39	
15	Red Star	34	9	11	14	37	51	−14	38	
16	Clermont (O)	34	7	12	15	30	46	−16	33	Qualification for relegation play-offs

Source: Ligue 2
Rules for classification: 1) Points; 2) Goal difference; 3) Number of goals scored; 4) Head-to-head goal difference; 5) Fair play points
(D) Disqualified; (O) Play-off winners; (R) Relegated

==== Matches ====
The match schedule was released on 21 June 2024.
