= Carter Pinnington =

English footballer (born 2007)

Personal information
- Full name: Carter William Pinnington
- Date of birth: 21 February 2007 (age 19)
- Place of birth: Bebington, Wirral, England
- Height: 1.87 m (6 ft 2 in)
- Position: Centre-back

Team information
- Current team: Solihull Moors (on loan from West Bromwich Albion)

Youth career
- 2014–2026: Liverpool

Senior career*
Years	Team	Apps	(Gls)
2025–2026	Liverpool	0	(0)
2026–	West Bromwich Albion	0	(0)
2026–	→ Solihull Moors (loan)	0	(0)

International career^{‡}
2022	England U15	4	(0)
2022	England U16	2	(0)
2024	England U18	4	(0)
- * Club domestic league appearances and goals ‡ National team caps and goals as of 14 October 2024

Carter William Pinnington (born 21 February 2007) is an English professional footballer who plays as a centre-back for Solihull Moors on loan from EFL Championship club West Bromwich Albion.

== Career ==
=== Early career ===
Pinnington was born in Bebington, Wirral. As a youth player, Pinnington joined the youth academy of Liverpool in the English Premier League.

=== West Bromwich Albion ===
Pinnington transferred to West Bromwich Albion on 18 June 2026.

On 29 September 2026, Pinnington joined National League club Solihull Moors on loan until 26 December.

== International career ==
Pinnington was born in England and is of South African descent, was eligible to represent the England national team and the South Africa national team.

Pinnington has featured for England at under-15, under-16 and under-18 level.
