= Windsor Park =

Football stadium in Belfast, Northern Ireland

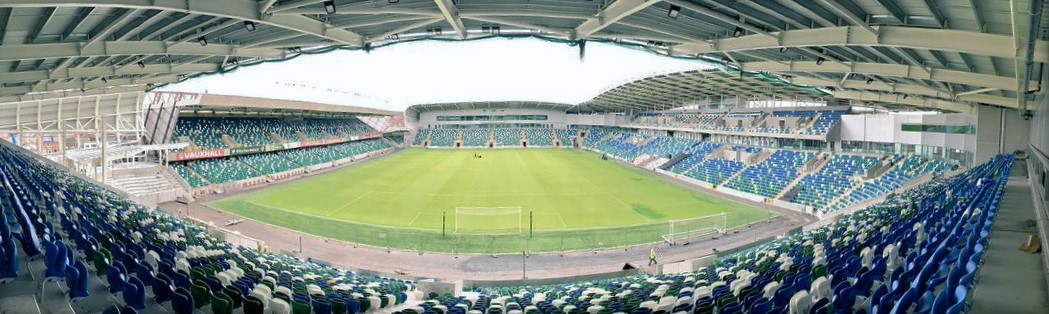
- Panoramic view of Windsor Park; UEFA
- Interactive map of Windsor Park
- Full name: National Stadium at Windsor Park
- Location: Belfast, Northern Ireland
- Coordinates: 54°34′57″N 5°57′19″W
- Owner: Irish Football Association (stadium); Linfield (land)
- Capacity: 18,434
- Surface: Grass
- Field size: 110 yd × 75 yd (101 m × 69 m)
- Public transit: Adelaide (rail station), Windsor Avenue, Olympia Leisure Centre, Tate's Avenue (Metro stop)

Construction
- Built: 1903
- Opened: 1905
- Renovated: 1996, 2015

Tenants
- Linfield (1905–present); Northern Ireland national football team (1910–present); Northern Ireland women's national football team (2023–present); Larne (in European competitions, 2024–present)

The National Football Stadium at Windsor Park, (Note: Officially the Clearer Twist National Stadium at Windsor Park for sponsorship reasons) more commonly known as Windsor Park, is a football stadium in Belfast, Northern Ireland. It is the home ground of Linfield, who own the site's land, while the Irish Football Association own and operate the stadium; paying Linfield an annual rental fee for its use on behalf of the Northern Ireland national football team. The stadium frequently holds the Irish Cup final.

== History ==
Named after the district in south Belfast in which it is located, Windsor Park was first opened in 1905, with a match between Linfield and Glentoran. The first major development of the stadium took place in the 1930s, to a design made by the Scottish architect Archibald Leitch. It had one main seated stand – the Grandstand, later known as the South Stand – with "reserved" terracing in front, and a large open terrace behind the goal to the west called the Spion Kop. To the north, there was a long covered terrace – the "unreserved" terracing – and behind the eastern goal at the Railway End another covered terrace. Windsor Park's peak capacity in this format was 60,000. In the early 1960s, the seated Railway Stand was built at the Railway End, and in the early 1970s a social club and viewing lounge was constructed in the corner between the Railway Stand and the Grandstand. In the 1980s, the 'unreserved terrace' was demolished and replaced by a two-tier, 7000-seat North Stand. In the late 1990s, the Kop terrace was demolished and replaced with a 5000-seater Kop Stand. The Kop Stand was known as the Alex Russell Stand from 2004 to 2008 in honour of Linfield's former goalkeeper and coach and one-time Northern Ireland international, but reverted to being named 'The Kop Stand' following this.

In the 2023–24 league season, Linfield drew an average NIFL home attendance of 3,126, the highest in the league. Their highest home attendance was 9,047 in that league season. The Northern Ireland national team drew an average of 17,504 in the 2023 calendar year.

The stadium hosted the finals of the 2005 and 2024 UEFA European Under-19 Championships.

On 7 May 2025, the Clearer Group, a Larne-based drink manufacturer, bought the naming rights to the stadium and renamed it the "Clearer Twist National Stadium at Windsor Park".

== Redevelopment ==
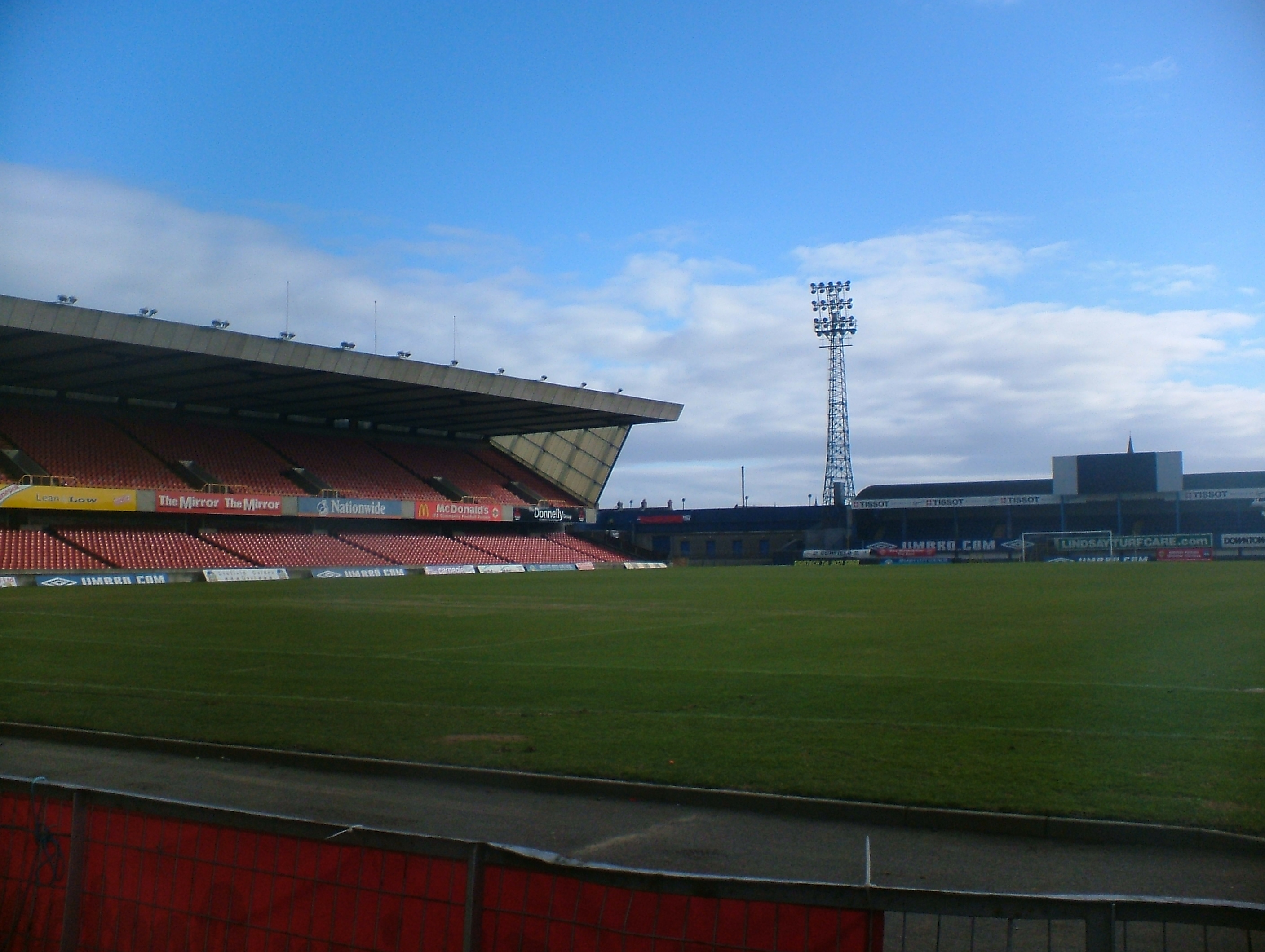
Windsor Park prior to redevelopment

Owing to the increasingly poor condition of Windsor Park, various proposals for its replacement were mooted, including the idea of a multi-purpose stadium hosting football, rugby union and Gaelic games on the site of the former Maze prison, or a national stadium built as part of a major leisure development at Sydenham in east Belfast. The plans for the multi-purpose stadium at the Maze site was strongly protested by essentially all the Northern Ireland match-going supporters. Various petitions in opposition to the suggestion, as well as organised displays of opposition at matches and the presentation counter-proposals, were arranged by Supporters Clubs in a bid to block any move to the Maze.

In September 2009, the Irish Football Association (IFA) announced that its preferred option was to remain at a redeveloped Windsor Park. In 2011, the Northern Ireland Executive allocated £138m for a major programme of stadium redevelopment throughout Northern Ireland, with £28m allocated to the redevelopment of Windsor Park into a 20,000-capacity all-seater stadium.

In 2012, details of the stadium's redevelopment were released. The plan would see Windsor Park become an 18,000 all-seater stadium with a series of phased works originally intended to begin in the summer of 2013. Plans included the demolition of both the Railway and South Stand structures to be replaced by new stands that would partially enclose the stadium, the complete renovation of the existing North and West Stands, and construction of both new conferencing facilities and a new headquarters facility for the IFA.

In February 2013, planning permission for the redevelopment was granted, with the estimated cost of the project around £29.2 million, of which £25.2 million would come from government funding. It was planned for the work to begin in September 2013. Two months later however, an application for leave for judicial review of the government funding was lodged by Crusaders, who claimed that it was against European Union competition laws and also a form of state aid to Linfield. In a hearing that took place on 22 May 2013, Crusaders' request was granted, after the judge ruled that they had presented an arguable case that the redevelopment could be classified as state aid towards Linfield. The aspect of the challenge concerning competition law however, was thrown out.

In July 2013, Crusaders agreed to a possible settlement brought forward by the judicial review. The details of the settlement were not forthcoming, but Crusaders said that it had the "potential to benefit the entirety of the football family". In September 2013, sports minister Carál Ní Chuilín said that she was still committed to making sure the redevelopment went ahead as scheduled, after previously stating that she would not sign off on the funding until the IFA sorted out the "governance issues" surrounding David Martin's return to the role of deputy president. In December 2013, three months after the work was originally scheduled to begin, the redevelopment was finally given the green light, with the sports minister signing off on £31 million of funding to complete the project. In May 2014, work finally got under way on the stadium redevelopment.

In March 2015, following a Euro 2016 qualifying game against Finland, large cracks were found in the West Stand; this part of the stadium was scheduled for renovation rather than replacement as part of the redevelopment project. As a consequence, the area around the stand had to be sealed off, and led to the 2015 Irish Cup Final being moved to The Oval. The preliminary structural report delivered to the IFA recommended that the damaged stand be demolished. Having accepted this report, the IFA confirmed that the West Stand would be demolished in time to ensure the safety of the stadium for Northern Ireland's qualifier against Romania on 10 June, as well as stating that work on the redevelopment project would be accelerated so that the stadium could meet its 10,000 planned capacity for the game. Plans for a new West Stand were approved in November 2015, funded by the insurance on the old facility. The new structure was intended to be ready in time for Northern Ireland's World Cup qualifier against San Marino in October 2016.

== UEFA Super Cup ==
Windsor Park was selected as the host of the 2021 UEFA Super Cup by the UEFA Executive Committee during their meeting in Ljubljana, Slovenia, on 24 September 2019. The match was played on 11 August 2021 between 2020–21 UEFA Champions League winners Chelsea and 2020–21 UEFA Europa League winners Villarreal with Chelsea winning on a penalty shoot out.

== Rugby union ==
In 1922, the final of the Ulster Schools' Cup was held at Windsor Park.

Ulster Schools' Cup
Date	Winners	Score	Runners-up
17 March 1922	Campbell College Belfast	10-0	Royal Belfast Academical Institution

== Rugby league ==
Windsor Park held one group stage match of the 2000 Rugby League World Cup.

International Rugby League Matches
Date	Home	Score	Opponent	Competition	Attendance
28 October 2000	Ireland	30–16	Samoa	2000 Rugby League World Cup	3,207

== See also ==
- List of stadiums in the United Kingdom by capacity
- Lists of stadiums

== Footnotes ==
Preceded by Tolka Park	Setanta Sports Cup; Final venue 2007	Succeeded by Turners Cross
Preceded by Puskás Aréna; Budapest	UEFA Super Cup; Match venue 2021	Succeeded by Olympic Stadium; Helsinki
